= 2013 Nevada Wolf Pack football team =

American college football season

2013 Nevada Wolf Pack football
- Conference: Mountain West Conference
- West Division
- Record: 4–8 (3–5 MW)
- Head coach: Brian Polian (1st season)
- Offensive coordinator: Nick Rolovich (2nd season)
- Offensive scheme: Pistol
- Co-defensive coordinators: Scottie Hazelton (1st season); Bill Teerlinck (1st season)
- Base defense: 4–3
- Home stadium: Mackay Stadium

2013 Mountain West Conference football standings
	Conf.			Overall
Team	W		L	W		L
Mountain Division
Utah State x	7	–	1	9	–	5
Boise State	6	–	2	8	–	5
Colorado State	5	–	3	8	–	6
Wyoming	3	–	5	5	–	7
New Mexico	1	–	7	3	–	9
Air Force	0	–	8	2	–	10
West Division
Fresno State x$	7	–	1	11	–	2
San Diego State	6	–	2	8	–	5
UNLV	5	–	3	7	–	6
San Jose State	5	–	3	6	–	6
Nevada	3	–	5	4	–	8
Hawaii	0	–	8	1	–	11
Championship: Fresno State 24, Utah State 17
$ – Conference champion; x – Division champion/co-champions; Rankings from AP Poll

The 2013 Nevada Wolf Pack football team represented the University of Nevada, Reno in the 2013 NCAA Division I FBS football season. The Wolf Pack were led by first–year head coach Brian Polian and played their home games at Mackay Stadium. They were members of the West Division of the Mountain West Conference. They finished the season 4–8 and 3–5 in Mountain West play to finish in fifth place in the West Division.

== Schedule ==
Date	Time	Opponent	Site	TV	Result	Attendance
August 31	7:00 p.m.	at No. 21 UCLA*	Rose Bowl; Pasadena, CA	P12N	L 20–58	60,562
September 7	6:00 p.m.	UC Davis*	Mackay Stadium; Reno, NV		W 36–7	27,052
September 14	12:30 p.m.	at No. 10 Florida State*	Doak Campbell Stadium; Tallahassee, FL	ESPN	L 7–62	73,847
September 21	5:00 p.m.	Hawaii	Mackay Stadium; Reno, NV	Campus Insiders/Oceanic PPV	W 31–9	23,240
September 28	5:00 p.m.	Air Force	Mackay Stadium; Reno, NV	CBSSN	W 45–42	24,545
October 4	6:00 p.m.	at San Diego State	Qualcomm Stadium; San Diego, CA	ESPN	L 44–51 ^{OT}	22,475
October 19	5:00 p.m.	at Boise State	Bronco Stadium; Boise, ID (rivalry)	CBSSN	L 17–34	35,843
October 26	3:00 p.m.	UNLV^{†}	Mackay Stadium; Reno, NV (Fremont Cannon)	ESPN3	L 22–27	32,521
November 2	7:30 p.m.	at No. 16 Fresno State	Bulldog Stadium; Fresno, CA	ESPNU	L 23–41	41,031
November 9	12:30 p.m.	at Colorado State	Hughes Stadium; Fort Collins, CO	Campus Insiders	L 17–38	15,234
November 16	7:30 p.m.	San Jose State	Mackay Stadium; Reno, NV	ESPNU	W 38–16	20,737
November 30	12:00 p.m.	BYU*	Mackay Stadium; Reno, NV	CBSSN	L 23–28	21,540
*Non-conference game; ^{†}Homecoming; Rankings from AP Poll released prior to the game; All times are in Pacific time

== Preseason ==
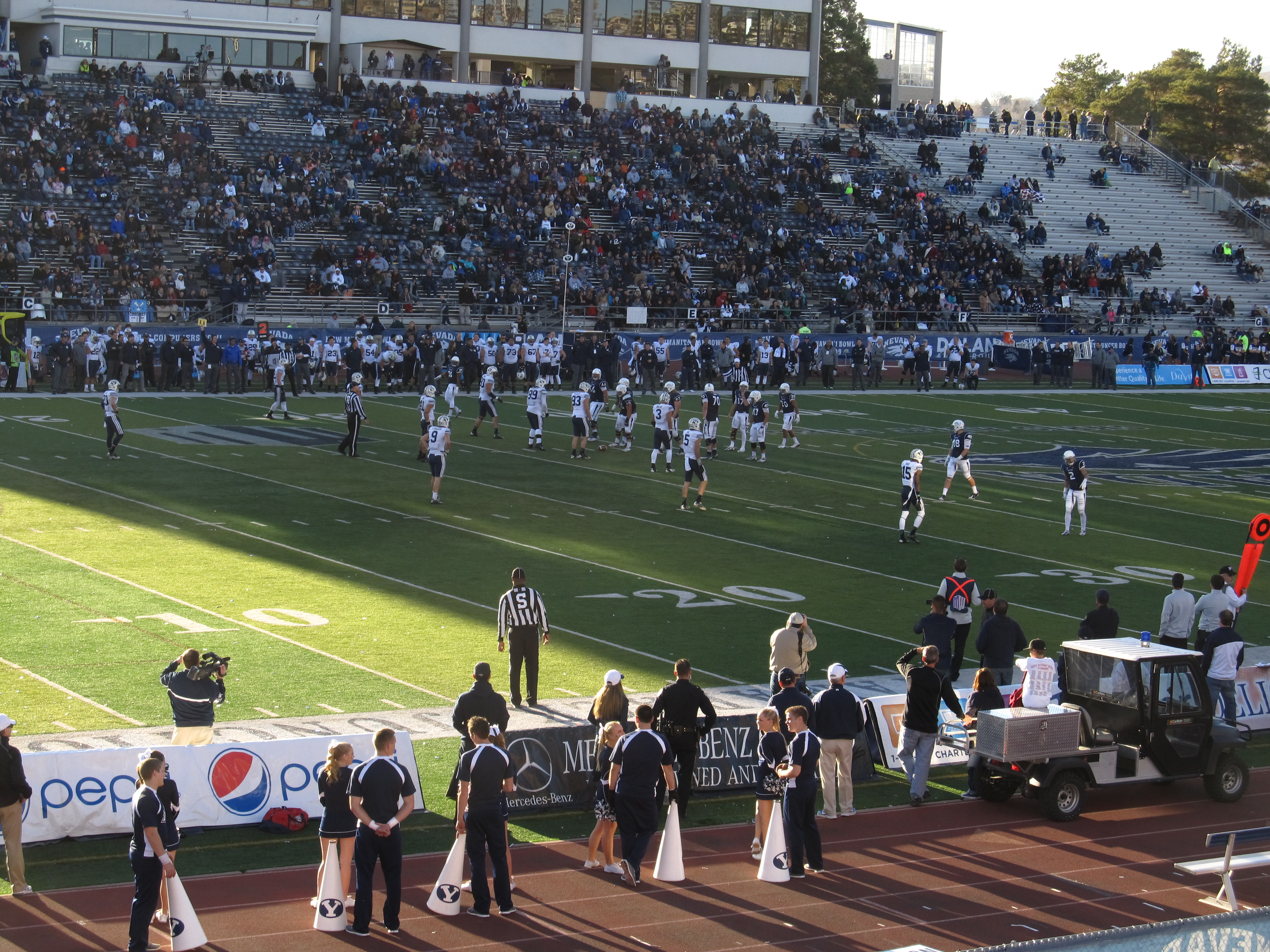
Nevada on the Chris Ault Field vs. BYU on November 30, 2013 at Mackay Stadium in Reno, Nevada

=== Mountain West media days ===
The Mountain West media days were held on July 22–23, 2013, at the Cosmopolitan in Paradise, Nevada.

=== Media poll ===
The preseason poll was released on July 22, 2013. The Wolf Pack were predicted to finish in fourth place in the MW West Division.

=== Preseason All–Mountain West Team ===
The Wolf Pack had one player selected to the preseason All–Mountain West Team; one from the defense.

Defense

Brock Hekking – DL

== Game summaries ==
=== At UCLA ===
Nevada at UCLA

Team	1	2	3	4	Total
Wolf Pack	3	10	0	7	20
• No. 21 Bruins	7	10	20	21	58

- Date: August 31, 2013
- Location: Rose Bowl
  Pasadena, CA
- Game start: 7:08 p.m. PDT
- Elapsed time: 3 hours and 21 minutes
- Game attendance: 60,562
- Game weather: Temperature: 83 °F (28 °C) • Weather: Hazy and 51% Humidity • Wind: W 9 MPH
- Referee: Terry Leyden
- TV announcers (P12N): Kevin Calabro (play–by–play), Yogi Roth (analyst) and Jill Savage (sideline)

Scoring summary
1	10:38	UCLA	Brett Hundley 37–yard run (Kaʻimi Fairbairn kick) (8 plays, 83 yards, 2:02)	UCLA 7–0
1	04:00	NEV	Brent Zuzo 28–yard field goal (16 plays, 64 yards, 6:38)	UCLA 7–3
2	11:23	UCLA	Kaʻimi Fairbairn 40–yard field goal (15 plays, 72 yards, 4:00)	UCLA 10–3
2	05:51	NEV	Brent Zuzo 21–yard field goal (13 plays, 79 yards, 5:28)	UCLA 10–6
2	02:15	UCLA	Shaquelle Evans 5–yard pass from Brett Hundley (Kaʻimi Fairbairn kick) (10 play, 73 yards, 3:32)	UCLA 17–6
2	00:07	NEV	Cody Fajardo 1–yard run (Brent Zuzo kick) (12 plays, 81 yards, 2:04)	UCLA 17–13
3	11:03	UCLA	Brett Hundley 11–yard run (Kaʻimi Fairbairn kick) (11 plays, 71 yards, 3:51)	UCLA 24–13
3	09:57	UCLA	Phillip Ruhl 4–yard punt return (Kaʻimi Fairbairn kick)	UCLA 31–13
3	04:01	UCLA	Jordon James 26–yard run (Jerry Neuheisel pass failed) (10 plays, 71 yards, 3:04)	UCLA 37–13
4	14:25	NEV	Cody Fajardo 19–yard run (Brent Zuzo kick) (15 plays, 75 yards, 4:36)	UCLA 37–20
4	12:07	UCLA	Paul Perkins 3–yard run (Kaʻimi Fairbairn kick) (7 plays, 75 yards, 2:12)	UCLA 44–20
4	10:06	UCLA	Malcolm Jones 25–yard pass from Brett Hundley (Kaʻimi Fairbairn kick) (5 plays, 47 yards, 1:03)	UCLA 51–20
4	07:50	UCLA	Malcolm Jones 1–yard run (Kaʻimi Fairbairn kick) (4 plays, 33 yards, 1:17)	UCLA 58–20

Statistics	Nevada	UCLA
First downs	24	32
Total yards	353	647
Rushing yards	171	345
Passing yards	182	302
Turnovers	1	3
Time of possession	33:53	26:07

Team	Category	Player	Statistics
Nevada	Passing	Cody Fajardo	19/32, 164 yards
Nevada	Rushing	Cody Fajardo	22 carries, 106 yards, 2 TDs
Nevada	Receiving	Richy Turner	6 receptions, 47 yards
UCLA	Passing	Brett Hundley	22/33, 274 yards, 2 TDs
UCLA	Rushing	Jordan James	21 carries, 155 yards, 1 TD
UCLA	Receiving	Shaquelle Evans	6 receptions, 81 yards, 1 TD

=== UC Davis ===
UC Davis at Nevada

Team	1	2	3	4	Total
Aggies (Div. I FCS)	0	7	0	0	7
• Wolf Pack	13	7	13	3	36

- Date: September 7, 2013
- Location: Mackay Stadium
  Reno, NV
- Game start: 6:15 p.m. PDT
- Elapsed time: 2 hours and 48 minutes
- Game attendance: 27,052
- Game weather: Temperature: 81 °F (27 °C) • Weather: Sunny • Wind: SW 6 MPH
- Referee: Brandon Cruse
- TV announcers (None): None

Scoring summary
1	13:59	NEV	Cody Fajardo 7–yard run (Brent Zuzo kick) (3 plays, 24 yards, 0:50)	NEV 7–0
1	11:02	NEV	Richy Turner 40–yard pass from Cody Fajardo (Team rush fumbled) (4 plays, 80 yards, 0:22)	NEV 13–0
2	01:51	NEV	Kendall Brock 2–yard run (Brent Zuzo kick) (16 plays, 80 yards, 5:48)	NEV 20–0
2	01:01	UCD	Tom Hemmingsen 23–yard from Jimmy Laughrea (Brady Stuart kick) (3 plays, 35 yards, 0:42)	NEV 20–7
3	12:52	NEV	Kendall Brock 6–yard run (Brent Zuzo kick) (7 plays, 75 yards, 2:08)	NEV 27–7
3	04:38	NEV	Brandon Wimberly 8–yard pass from Cody Fajardo (Brent Zuzo kick failed) (8 plays, 87 yards, 2:56)	NEV 33–7
4	10:30	NEV	Brent Zuzo 23–yard field goal (18 plays, 81 yards, 7:24)	NEV 36–7

Statistics	UC Davis	Nevada
First downs	11	30
Total yards	296	535
Rushing yards	118	267
Passing yards	178	268
Turnovers	2	3
Time of possession	24:53	35:07

Team	Category	Player	Statistics
UC Davis	Passing	Jimmy Laughrea	13/27, 178 yards, 1 TD, 2 INTs
UC Davis	Rushing	Manusamoa Luuga	13 carries, 81 yards
UC Davis	Receiving	Tom Hemmingsen	6 receptions, 87 yards, 1 TD
Nevada	Passing	Cody Fajardo	18/21, 239 yards, 2 TDs
Nevada	Rushing	Kendall Brock	27 carries, 116 yards, 2 TDs
Nevada	Receiving	Richy Turner	6 receptions, 136 yards, 1 TD

=== At Florida State ===
Nevada at Florida State

Team	1	2	3	4	Total
Wolf Pack	0	7	0	0	7
• No. 10 Seminoles	3	14	31	14	62

- Date: September 14, 2013
- Location: Doak Campbell Stadium
  Tallahassee, FL
- Game start: 3:35 p.m. EDT
- Elapsed time: 3 hours and 20 minutes
- Game attendance: 73,847
- Game weather: Temperature: 90 °F (32 °C) • Weather: Partly Cloudy and 47% Humidity • Wind: WSW 4 MPH
- Referee: Jerry Magallanes
- TV announcers (ESPN): Bob Wischusen (play–by–play), Rod Gilmore (analyst) and Quint Kessenich (sideline)

Scoring summary
1	06:19	FS	Roberto Aguayo 23–yard field goal (12 plays, 77 yards, 5:28)	FS 3–0
2	11:31	NEV	Brandon Wimberly 11–yard pass from Devin Combs (Brent Zuzo kick) (4 plays, 28 yards, 2:02)	NEV 7–3
2	03:21	FS	Kenny Shaw 24–yard pass from Jameis Winston (Roberto Aguayo kick) (7 plays, 92 yards, 2:33)	FS 10–7
2	00:38	FS	Rashad Greene 24–yard pass from Jameis Winston (Roberto Aguayo kick) (4 plays, 56 yards, 1:12)	FS 17–7
3	14:29	FS	Devonta Freeman 6–yard run (Roberto Aguayo kick) (2 plays, 66 yards, 0:25)	FS 24–7
3	12:47	FS	Karlos Williams 65–yard run (Roberto Aguayo kick) (1 play, 65 yards, 0:08)	FS 31–7
3	10:06	FS	James Wilder Jr. 1–yard run (Roberto Aguayo kick) (4 plays, 61 yards, 1:17)	FS 38–7
3	04:41	FS	Jameis Winston 10–yard run (Roberto Aguayo kick) (5 plays, 45 yards, 1:56)	FS 45–7
3	00:58	FS	Roberto Aguayo 33–yard field goal (7 plays, 62 yards, 2:14)	FS 48–7
4	07:11	FS	Freddie Stevenson 1–yard run (Roberto Aguayo kick) (9 plays, 69 yards, 4:42)	FS 55–7
4	02:48	FS	Ryan Green 1–yard run (Roberto Aguayo kick) (6 plays, 64 yards, 2:45)	FS 62–7

Statistics	Nevada	Florida State
First downs	13	29
Total yards	214	617
Rushing yards	128	377
Passing yards	86	240
Turnovers	0	0
Time of possession	33:01	26:59

Team	Category	Player	Statistics
Nevada	Passing	Tyler Stewart	7/15, 49 yards, 1 INT
Nevada	Rushing	Chris Solomon	26 carries, 108 yards
Nevada	Receiving	Brandon Wimberly	5 receptions, 23 yards, 1 TD
Florida State	Passing	Jameis Winston	15/18, 214 yards, 2 TDs, 1 INT
Florida State	Rushing	Karlos Williams	8 carries, 110 yards, 1 TD
Florida State	Receiving	Kenny Shaw	6 receptions, 94 yards, 1 TD

=== Hawaii ===
Hawaii at Nevada

Team	1	2	3	4	Total
Rainbow Warriors	3	6	0	0	9
• Wolf Pack	7	10	7	7	31

- Date: September 21, 2013
- Location: Mackay Stadium
  Reno, NV
- Game start: 5:07 p.m. PDT
- Elapsed time: 2 hours and 56 minutes
- Game attendance: 23,240
- Game weather: Temperature: 55 °F (13 °C) • Weather: Cool and Overcast • Wind: NW 22–28 MPH
- Referee: Mike Defee
- TV announcers (Campus Insiders/Oceanic PPV): Robert Kekaula (play–by–play) and Dick Tomey (analyst)

Scoring summary
1	07:52	UH	Tyler Hadden 28–yard field goal (13 plays, 53 yards, 6:12)	UH 3–0
1	05:07	NEV	Kolby Arendse 5–yard pass from Tyler Stewart (Brent Zuzo kick) (6 plays, 75 yards, 2:45)	NEV 7–3
2	14:55	NEV	Kolby Arendse 2–yard pass from Tyler Stewart (Brent Zuzo kick) (6 plays, 72 yards, 2:02)	NEV 14–3
2	03:19	NEV	Brent Zuzo 21–yard field goal (14 plays, 70 yards, 5:19)	NEV 17–3
2	00:34	UH	Chris Gant 21–yard pass from Sean Schroeder (Team kick failed) (6 plays, 75 yards, 2:45)	NEV 17–9
3	12:32	NEV	Brandon Wimberly 7–yard pass from Tyler Stewart (Brent Zuzo kick) (5 plays, 12 yards, 1:44)	NEV 24–9
4	10:25	NEV	Alex Bertrando 2–yard fumble recovery (Brent Zuzo kick)	NEV 31–9

Statistics	Hawaii	Nevada
First downs	20	10
Total yards	376	340
Rushing yards	133	138
Passing yards	243	202
Turnovers	5	2
Time of possession	32:29	27:31

Team	Category	Player	Statistics
Hawaii	Passing	Taylor Graham	9/15, 77 yards
Hawaii	Rushing	Diocemy Saint Juste	12 carries, 82 yards
Hawaii	Receiving	Vasquez Haynes	4 receptions, 43 yards
Nevada	Passing	Tyler Stewart	14/20, 202 yards, 3 TDs
Nevada	Rushing	Kendall Brock	15 carries, 69 yards
Nevada	Receiving	Kolby Arendse	4 receptions, 77 yards, 2 TDs

=== Air Force ===
Air Force at Nevada

Team	1	2	3	4	Total
Falcons	7	14	14	7	42
• Wolf Pack	7	10	7	21	45

- Date: September 28, 2013
- Location: Mackay Stadium
  Reno, NV
- Game start: 5:04 p.m. PDT
- Elapsed time: 3 hours and 41 minutes
- Game attendance: 24,545
- Game weather: Temperature: 76 °F (24 °C) • Weather: Partly Cloudy • Wind: NW 7 MPH
- Referee: Daniel Romeo
- TV announcers (CBSSN): Andrew Catalon (play–by–play), Aaron Taylor (analyst) and Lauren Gardner (sideline)

Scoring summary
1	04:34	NEV	Brandon Wimberly 5–yard pass from Cody Fajardo (Brent Zuzo kick) (17 plays, 96 yards, 6:25)	NEV 7–0
1	02:11	AF	Jon Lee 6–yard run (Will Conant kick) (5 plays, 80 yards, 2:18)	TIE 7–7
2	14:54	AF	Anthony LaCoste 8–yard run (Will Conant kick) (4 plays, 22 yards, 1:30)	AF 14–7
2	09:30	NEV	Brent Zuzo 26–yard field goal (14 plays, 70 yards, 5:22)	AF 14–10
2	07:55	AF	Broam Hart 1–yard run (Will Conant kick) (4 plays, 75 yards, 1:35)	AF 21–10
2	02:00	NEV	Richy Turner 18–yard pass from Cody Fajardo (Brent Zuzo kick) (15 plays, 80 yards, 5:48)	AF 21–17
3	09:39	AF	Karson Roberts 9–yard run (Will Conant kick) (10 plays, 75 yards, 5:21)	AF 28–17
3	06:28	NEV	Cody Fajardo 19–yard run (Brent Zuzo kick) (11 plays, 68 yards, 3:06)	AF 28–24
3	01:41	AF	Karson Roberts 11–yard run (Will Conant kick) (9 plays, 75 yards, 4:47)	AF 35–24
4	12:41	NEV	Don Jackson 9–yard run (Brent Zuzo kick) (12 plays, 72 yards, 3:54)	AF 35–30
4	07:44	AF	Sam Gagliano 23–yard pass from Karson Roberts (Will Conant kick) (9 plays, 60 yards, 4:51)	AF 42–30
4	05:56	NEV	Aaron Bradley 9–yard pass from Cody Fajardo (Brent Zuzo kick) (9 plays, 75 yards, 1:48)	AF 42–37
4	01:45	NEV	Cody Fajardo 2–yard run (Brent Zuzo kick) (9 plays, 50 yards, 2:05)	NEV 45–42

Statistics	Air Force	Nevada
First downs	18	35
Total yards	453	599
Rushing yards	375	210
Passing yards	78	389
Turnovers	1	2
Time of possession	27:57	32:03

Team	Category	Player	Statistics
Air Force	Passing	Karson Roberts	5/10, 55 yards, 1 TD, 1 INT
Air Force	Rushing	Karson Roberts	23 carries, 161 yards, 2 TDs
Air Force	Receiving	Sam Gagliano	2 receptions, 26 yards, 1 TD
Nevada	Passing	Cody Fajardo	38/54, 389 yards, 3 TDs
Nevada	Rushing	Kendall Brock	21 carries, 88 yards
Nevada	Receiving	Aaron Bradley	11 receptions, 135 yards, 1 TD

=== At San Diego State ===
Nevada at San Diego State

Team	1	2	3	4	OT	Total
Wolf Pack	7	10	6	21	0	44
• Aztecs	7	16	21	0	7	51

- Date: October 4, 2013
- Location: Qualcomm Stadium
  San Diego, CA
- Game start: 6:01 p.m. PDT
- Elapsed time: 3 hours and 52 minutes
- Game attendance: 22,475
- Game weather: Temperature: 69 °F (21 °C) • Weather: Clear Skies • Wind: NNW 6 MPH
- Referee: Randy Christal
- TV announcers (ESPN): Carter Blackburn (play–by–play), Danny Kanell (analyst) and Allison Williams (sideline)

Scoring summary
1	10:36	SDSU	Donnel Pumphrey 72–yard run (Wes Feer kick) (3 plays, 80 yards, 1:13)	SDSU 7–0
1	06:24	NEV	Kendall Brock 1–yard run (Brent Zuzo kick) (13 plays, 75 yards, 4:07)	TIE 7–7
2	13:49	NEV	Brent Zuzo 44–yard field goal (9 plays, 51 yards, 3:25)	NEV 10–7
2	04:37	SDSU	Adam Muema 7–yard run (Wes Feer kick) (6 plays, 67 yards, 3:16)	SDSU 14–10
2	01:57	NEV	Brandon Wimberly 10–yard pass from Cody Fajardo (Brent Zuzo kick) (8 plays, 75 yards, 2:40)	NEV 17–14
2	00:46	SDSU	Team 20–yard safety	NEV 17–16
2	00:09	SDSU	Dylan Denso 25–yard pass from Quinn Kaehler (Wes Feer kick) (6 plays, 64 yards, 0:32)	SDSU 23–17
3	12:29	SDSU	Adam Muema 9–yard run (Wes Feer kick failed) (1 play, 9 yards, 0:04)	SDSU 29–17
3	08:09	SDSU	Tim Vizzi 5–yard run (Wes Feer kick) (5 plays, 33 yards, 2:02)	SDSU 36–17
3	04:33	NEV	Kendall Brock 4–yard run (Brent Zuzo kick failed) (11 plays, 75 yards, 3:36)	SDSU 36–23
3	00:24	SDSU	Eric Judge 5–yard pass from Quinn Kaehler (Adam Muema rush) (9 plays, 65 yards, 4:09)	SDSU 44–23
4	12:43	NEV	Kendall Brock 3–yard run (Brent Zuzo kick) (11 plays, 75 yards, 2:41)	SDSU 44–30
4	06:26	NEV	Don Jackson 1–yard run (Brent Zuzo kick) (14 plays, 78 yards, 4:10)	SDSU 44–37
4	01:38	NEV	Richy Turner 5–yard pass from Cody Fajardo (Brent Zuzo kick) (6 plays, 60 yards, 1:35)	TIE 44–44
OT	15:00	SDSU	Eric Judge 13–yard pass from Quinn Kahler (Wes Feer kick) (5 plays, 25 yards, 0:00)	SDSU 51–44

Statistics	Nevada	San Diego State
First downs	33	21
Total yards	570	541
Rushing yards	177	255
Passing yards	393	286
Turnovers	4	2
Time of possession	33:37	26:23

Team	Category	Player	Statistics
Nevada	Passing	Cody Fajardo	33/51, 393 yards, 2 TDs
Nevada	Rushing	Kendall Brock	25 carries, 112 yards, 3 TDs
Nevada	Receiving	Brandon Wimberly	12 receptions, 127 yards, 1 TD
San Diego State	Passing	Quinn Kaehler	23/32, 286 yards, 3 TDs
San Diego State	Rushing	Adam Muema	24 carries, 134 yards, 2 TDs
San Diego State	Receiving	Adam Roberts	4 receptions, 80 yards

=== At Boise State ===
Nevada at Boise State
(rivalry)

Team	1	2	3	4	Total
Wolf Pack	3	14	0	0	17
• Broncos	0	7	20	7	34

- Date: October 19, 2013
- Location: Bronco Stadium
- Game start: 6:04 p.m. MDT
- Elapsed time: 3 hours and 11 minutes
- Game attendance: 35,843
- Game weather: Temperature: 65 °F (18 °C) • Weather: Clear • Wind: NW 3 MPH
- Referee: David Alvarez
- TV announcers (CBSSN): Dave Ryan (play–by–play), Adam Archuleta (analyst) and Evan Washburn (sideline)

Scoring summary
1	07:45	NEV	Brent Zuzo 33–yard field goal (15 plays, 60 yards, 7:15)	NEV 3–0
2	07:40	NEV	Kendall Brock 6–yard run (Brent Zuzo kick) (13 plays, 75 yards, 5:44)	NEV 10–0
2	06:02	BSU	Jay Ajayi 9–yard run (Dan Goodale kick) (5 plays, 80 yards, 1:38)	NEV 10–7
2	01:01	NEV	Don Jackson 3–yard run (Brent Zuzo kick) (12 plays, 78 yards, 5:01)	NEV 17–7
3	12:14	BSU	Jay Ajayi 4–yard run (Dan Goodale kick failed) (8 plays, 66 yards, 2:46)	NEV 17–13
3	09:20	BSU	Jay Ajayi 71–yard run (Dan Goodale kick) (1 play, 71 yards, 0:11)	BSU 20–17
3	00:42	BSU	Grant Hedrick 20–yard run (Dan Goodale kick) (11 plays, 74 yards, 3:33)	BSU 27–17
4	08:28	BSU	Grant Hedrick 14–yard run (Dan Goodale kick) (11 plays, 77 yards, 2:51)	BSU 34–17

Statistics	Nevada	Boise State
First downs	27	26
Total yards	373	557
Rushing yards	165	407
Passing yards	208	150
Turnovers	0	0
Time of possession	37:23	22:37

Team	Category	Player	Statistics
Nevada	Passing	Cody Fajardo	22/29, 208 yards
Nevada	Rushing	Kendall Brock	18 carries, 78 yards, 1 TD
Nevada	Receiving	Brandon Wimberly	11 receptions, 121 yards
Boise State	Passing	Grant Hedrick	18/21, 150 yards, 1 INT
Boise State	Rushing	Jay Ajayi	24 carries, 222 yards, 3 TDs
Boise State	Receiving	Matt Miller	5 receptions, 55 yards

=== UNLV ===
UNLV at Nevada
(Battle for the Fremont Cannon / Governor's Series)

Team	1	2	3	4	Total
• Rebels	0	14	0	13	27
Wolf Pack	3	13	0	6	22

- Date: October 26, 2013
- Location: Mackay Stadium
  Reno, NV
- Game start: 3:05 p.m. PDT
- Elapsed time: 3 hours and 31 minutes
- Game attendance: 32,521
- Game weather: Temperature: 72 °F (22 °C) • Weather: Clear and Sunny • Wind: Calm
- Referee: Jim Farmer
- TV announcers (ESPN3): Trey Bender (play–by–play) and Kevin O'Connell (analyst)

Scoring summary
1	07:09	NEV	Brent Zuzo 40–yard field goal (6 plays, 57 yards, 2:14)	NEV 3–0
2	12:55	NEV	Brent Zuzo 22–yard field goal (14 plays, 63 yards, 4:36)	NEV 6–0
2	09:56	UNLV	Maika Mataele 16–yard pass from Caleb Herring (Nolan Kohorst kick) (9 plays, 75 yards, 2:59)	UNLV 7–6
2	05:52	NEV	Richy Turner 61–yard pass from Cody Fajardo (Brent Zuzo kick) (4 plays, 71 yards, 1:38)	NEV 13–7
2	04:18	UNLV	Devante Davis 44–yard pass from Caleb Herring (Nolan Kohorst kick) (5 plays, 75 yards, 1:34)	UNLV 14–13
2	00:24	NEV	Brent Zuzo 43–yard field goal (7 plays, 39 yards, 1:06)	NEV 16–14
4	11:46	UNLV	Tim Cornett 9–yard run (Nolan Kohorst kick) (3 plays, 27 yards, 0:40)	UNLV 21–16
4	05:54	UNLV	Devante Davis 11–yard pass from Caleb Herring (Nolan Kohorst kick) (10 plays, 80 yards, 4:42)	UNLV 24–16
4	03:25	NEV	Aaron Bradley 9–yard pass from Cody Fajardo (pass failed) (8 plays, 72 yards, 2:22)	UNLV 24–22

Statistics	UNLV	Nevada
First downs	29	18
Total yards	484	487
Rushing yards	149	130
Passing yards	335	357
Turnovers	3	2
Time of possession	33:36	26:24

Team	Category	Player	Statistics
UNLV	Passing	Caleb Herring	29/42, 335 yards, 3 TDs
UNLV	Rushing	Tim Cornett	26 carries, 122 yards, 1 TD
UNLV	Receiving	Devante Davis	8 receptions, 121 yards, 2 TDs
Nevada	Passing	Cody Fajardo	24/40, 357 yards, 2 TDs, 1 INT
Nevada	Rushing	Don Jackson	12 carries, 62 yards
Nevada	Receiving	Richy Turner	8 receptions, 149 yards, 1 TD

=== At Fresno State ===
Nevada at Fresno State

Team	1	2	3	4	Total
Wolf Pack	7	0	9	7	23
• No. 16 Bulldogs	14	10	0	17	41

- Date: November 2, 2013
- Location: Bulldog Stadium
  Fresno, CA
- Game start: 7:36 p.m. PDT
- Elapsed time: 3 hours and 36 minutes
- Game attendance: 41,031
- Game weather: Temperature: 66 °F (19 °C) • Weather: Partly Cloudy • Wind: NW 5 MPH
- Referee: Mike Defee
- TV announcers (ESPNU): Joe Davis (play–by–play) and David Diaz-Infante (analyst)

Scoring summary
1	11:19	NEV	Kendall Brock 43–yard run (Brent Zuzo kick) (7 plays, 81 yards, 3:41)	NEV 7–0
1	10:11	FSU	Davante Adams 5–yard pass from Derek Carr (Colin McGuire kick) (4 plays, 75 yards, 1:01)	TIE 7–7
1	00:21	FSU	Derek Carr 5–yard run (Colin McGuire kick) (12 plays, 83 yards, 3:46)	FSU 14–7
2	05:41	FSU	Colin McGuire 30–yard field goal (9 plays, 57 yards, 2:06)	FSU 17–7
2	00:35	FSU	Josh Harper 17–yard pass from Derek Carr (Colin McGuire kick) (10 plays, 80 yards, 2:17)	FSU 24–7
3	08:41	NEV	Brent Zuzo 33–yard field goal (10 plays, 62 yards, 5:20)	FSU 24–10
3	00:55	NEV	Brandon Wimberly 13–yard pass from Cody Fajardo (Brent Zuzo kick blocked) (2 plays, 60 yards, 0:26)	FSU 24–16
4	13:09	FSU	Josh Harper 32–yard pass from Derek Carr (Colin McGuire kick) (8 plays, 76 yards, 2:40)	FSU 31–16
4	08:48	NEV	Hasaan Henderson 32–yard pass from Cody Fajardo (Brent Zuzo kick) (5 plays, 49 yards, 1:47)	FSU 31–23
4	05:32	FSU	Colin McGuire 40–yard field goal (8 plays, 47 yards, 3:08)	FSU 34–23
4	01:29	FSU	Marteze Waller 3–yard run (Colin McGuire kick) (6 plays, 55 yards, 1:32)	FSU 41–23

Statistics	Nevada	Fresno State
First downs	17	32
Total yards	424	647
Rushing yards	218	160
Passing yards	206	487
Turnovers	0	2
Time of possession	32:24	27:36

Team	Category	Player	Statistics
Nevada	Passing	Cody Fajardo	14/24, 206 yards, 2 TDs, 1 INT
Nevada	Rushing	Cody Fajardo	17 carries, 98 yards
Nevada	Receiving	Hasaan Henderson	5 receptions, 82 yards, 1 TD
Fresno State	Passing	Derek Carr	39/55, 487 yards, 3 TDs
Fresno State	Rushing	Josh Quezada	17 carries, 115 yards
Fresno State	Receiving	Josh Harper	17 receptions, 253 yards, 2 TDs

=== At Colorado State ===
Nevada at Colorado State

Team	1	2	3	4	Total
Wolf Pack	0	7	10	0	17
• Rams	3	3	18	14	38

- Date: November 9, 2013
- Location: Hughes Stadium
  Fort Collins, CO
- Game start: 1:36 p.m. MST
- Elapsed time: 2 hours and 50 minutes
- Game attendance: 15,234
- Game weather: Temperature: 51 °F (11 °C) • Weather: Sunny • Wind: E 6 MPH
- Referee: Eddy Shelton
- TV announcers (Campus Insiders): Rich Cellini (play–by–play) and Ted Sundquist (analyst)

Scoring summary
1	06:00	CSU	Jared Roberts 23–yard field goal (15 plays, 54 yards, 6:29)	CSU 3–0
2	04:11	NEV	Chris Solomon 1–yard run (Brent Zuzo kick) (14 plays, 79 yards, 5:47)	NEV 7–3
2	01:30	CSU	Jared Roberts 46–yard field goal (7 plays, 45 yards, 2:34)	NEV 7–6
3	12:41	CSU	Kapri Bibbs 28–yard run (Jared Roberts kick) (6 plays, 75 yards, 2:19)	CSU 13–7
3	11:15	NEV	Cody Fajardo 68–yard run (Brent Zuzo kick) (3 plays, 76 yards, 1:19)	NEV 14–13
3	05:47	CSU	Jared Roberts 20–yard field goal (13 plays, 72 yards, 5:28)	CSU 16–14
3	01:54	NEV	Brent Zuzo 43–yard field goal (10 plays, 49 yards, 3:53)	NEV 17–16
3	00:32	CSU	Kapri Bibbs 59–yard run (Donnell Alexander rush) (3 plays, 79 yards, 1:15)	CSU 24–17
4	08:24	CSU	Kapri Bibbs 1–yard run (Jared Roberts kick) (6 plays, 80 yards, 2:40)	CSU 31–17
4	03:27	CSU	Kapri Bibbs 85–yard run (Jared Roberts kick) (1 play, 85 yards, 0:12)	CSU 38–17

Statistics	Nevada	Colorado State
First downs	20	24
Total yards	411	570
Rushing yards	164	331
Passing yards	247	239
Turnovers	2	1
Time of possession	31:23	28:37

Team	Category	Player	Statistics
Nevada	Passing	Cody Fajardo	31/46, 247 yards
Nevada	Rushing	Cody Fajardo	13 carries, 87 yards, 1 TD
Nevada	Receiving	Hasaan Henderson	10 receptions, 110 yards
Colorado State	Passing	Garrett Grayson	20/27, 239 yards, 1 INT
Colorado State	Rushing	Kapri Bibbs	30 carries, 312 yards, 4 TDs
Colorado State	Receiving	Joe Hansley	6 receptions, 63 yards

=== San Jose State ===
San Jose State at Nevada

Team	1	2	3	4	Total
Spartans	10	6	0	0	16
• Wolf Pack	7	14	14	3	38

- Date: November 16, 2013
- Location: Mackay Stadium
  Reno, NV
- Game start: 7:36 p.m. PST
- Elapsed time: 3 hours and 14 minutes
- Game attendance: 20,737
- Game weather: Temperature: 41 °F (5 °C) • Weather: Cold and Windy • Wind: WNW 11 MPH
- Referee: Cooper Castleberry
- TV announcers (ESPNU): Joe Davis (play–by–play) and David Diaz-Infante (analyst)

Scoring summary
1	10:42	NEV	Kendall Brock 2–yard run (Brent Zuzo kick) (12 plays, 75 yards, 4:18)	NEV 7–0
1	07:19	SJSU	Austin Lopez 47–yard field goal (9 plays, 46 yards, 3:19)	NEV 7–3
1	01:20	SJSU	Billy Freeman 5–yard pass from David Fales (Austin Lopez kick) (8 plays, 94 yards, 3:58)	SJSU 10–7
2	11:35	NEV	Kendall Brock 1–yard run (Brent Zuzo kick) (12 plays, 75 yards, 4:45)	NEV 14–10
2	07:22	SJSU	Austin Lopez 44–yard field goal (10 plays, 52 yards, 4:08)	NEV 14–13
2	03:32	NEV	Brandon Wimberly 2–yard pass from Cody Fajardo (Brent Zuzo kick) (10 plays, 61 yards, 3:43)	NEV 21–13
2	00:00	SJSU	Austin Lopez 50–yard field goal (8 plays, 43 yards, 1:00)	NEV 21–16
3	07:02	NEV	Don Jackson 39–yard run (Brent Zuzo kick) (4 plays, 62 yards, 1:27)	NEV 28–16
3	03:08	NEV	Cody Fajardo 17–yard run (Brent Zuzo kick) (7 plays, 64 yards, 2:00)	NEV 35–16
4	06:34	NEV	Brent Zuzo 44–yard field goal (5 plays, 18 yards, 2:24)	NEV 38–16

Statistics	San Jose State	Nevada
First downs	21	25
Total yards	384	482
Rushing yards	58	276
Passing yards	326	206
Turnovers	2	2
Time of possession	29:18	30:42

Team	Category	Player	Statistics
San Jose State	Passing	David Fales	28/43, 326 yards, 1 TD
San Jose State	Rushing	Thomas Tucker	7 receptions, 49 yards
San Jose State	Receiving	Chandler Jones	6 receptions, 77 yards
Nevada	Passing	Cody Fajardo	21/28, 206 yards, 1 TD
Nevada	Rushing	Cody Fajardo	14 carries, 104 yards, 1 TD
Nevada	Receiving	Brandon Wimberly	11 receptions, 93 yards, 1 TD

=== BYU ===
BYU at Nevada

Team	1	2	3	4	Total
• Cougars	0	0	14	14	28
Wolf Pack	7	0	7	9	23

- Date: November 30, 2013
- Location: Mackay Stadium
  Reno, NV
- Game start: 12:00 p.m. PST
- Elapsed time: 3 hours and 14 minutes
- Game attendance: 21,540
- Game weather: Temperature: N/A • Weather: N/A • Wind: N/A
- Referee: Scott Novak
- TV announcers (CBSSN): Andrew Catalon (play–by–play), Randy Cross (analyst) and Lauren Gardner (sideline)

Scoring summary
1	12:10	NEV	Kendall Brock 2–yard run (Brent Zuzo kick) (8 plays, 81 yards, 2:50)	NEV 7–0
3	14:28	BYU	Jamaal Williams 66–yard run (Justin Sorensen kick) (2 plays, 75 yards, 0:32)	TIE 7–7
3	09:34	NEV	Cody Fajardo 3–yard run (Brent Zuzo kick) (11 plays, 75 yards, 4:54)	NEV 14–7
3	06:07	BYU	Kaneakua Friel 10–yard pass from Taysom Hill (Justin Sorensen kick) (9 plays, 80 yards, 3:22)	TIE 14–14
4	14:50	BYU	J.D. Falslev 3–yard pass from Taysom Hill (Justin Sorensen kick) (13 plays, 59 yards, 4:07)	BYU 21–14
4	09:02	NEV	Brent Zuzo 24–yard field goal (13 plays, 70 yards, 5:48)	BYU 21–17
4	06:40	BYU	Taysom Hill 35–yard run (Justin Sorensen kick) (8 plays, 75 yards, 2:18)	BYU 28–17
4	02:42	NEV	Brandon Wimberly 4–yard pass from Cody Fajardo (pass intercepted) (11 plays, 67 yards, 3:53)	BYU 28–23

Statistics	BYU	Nevada
First downs	19	26
Total yards	492	363
Rushing yards	394	104
Passing yards	98	259
Turnovers	3	0
Time of possession	24:23	35:37

Team	Category	Player	Statistics
BYU	Passing	Taysom Hill	14/18, 98 yards, 2 TDs
BYU	Rushing	Jamaal Williams	15 carries, 219 yards, 1 TD
BYU	Receiving	Skyler Ridley	3 receptions, 27 yards
Nevada	Passing	Cody Fajardo	23/33, 259 yards, 1 TD, 1 INT
Nevada	Rushing	Kendall Brock	14 carries, 56 yards, 1 TD
Nevada	Receiving	Brandon Wimberly	10 receptions, 117 yards, 1 TD

== Roster ==
2013 Nevada Wolf Pack football team roster
Players
Coaches
Offense

Pos.	#	Name	Class
WR	3	Nigel Westbrooks	Jr
WR	4	Brandon Wimberly	Sr
WR	12	Richy Turner	Jr
QB	13	Devin Combs	Jr
WR	14	Sike Azu-Irondi	Fr
QB	15	Tyler Stewart	Fr
QB	16	Hasaan Henderson	Fr
QB	17	Cody Fajardo (C)	Jr
WR	19	Marquis Newell	Fr
RB	20	Kendall Brock	Jr
WR	22	Jimbo Davis IV	Fr
WR	26	Nick Palko	So
WR	29	D'Andre Fuller	Fr
RB	30	Chris Solomon	Fr
WR	31	Randy Uzoma	Fr
RB	32	Don Jackson	So
RB	33	Xavier Stephens	Fr
RB	38	Nate Lytle	Jr
RB	39	Nate McLaurin	Jr
TE	44	Patrick Clifford	Fr
TE	45	Austin Carrow	Fr
TE	47	Jarred Gipson	Fr
TE	48	Cody Tuttle	Fr
OL	57	Connor Talbott	So
OL	59	Kyle Papendorf	Jr
OL	60	Adam Khouri	Fr
OL	61	Joey Anglemire	Fr
OL	62	Zach Brickell	So
OL	63	Aisea Hansen	Fr
OL	64	Abe Abdelkarim	Fr
OL	65	Matt Galas	Jr
OL	66	Kyle Roberts	Jr
OL	68	Brent Roling	So
OL	70	Joel Bitonio	Sr
OL	71	Salesa Faraimo	Fr
OL	72	Jeremy Macauley	Fr
OL	73	Austin Corbett	Fr
OL	74	Abel De Haro	So
OL	76	Bryce Spring	Fr
OL	77	Ziad Damanhoury	Fr
OL	79	Jacob Henry	Fr
WR	80	Dominic Coulter	So
WR	81	Aaron Bradley	Jr
WR	83	Joseph Huber	Sr
WR	84	Jerico Richardson	Fr
WR	84	Parker Vail	Jr
TE	85	Randy Horton	Jr
TE	86	Kolby Arendse	Sr
WR	87	Necho Beard	Jr
WR	87	Garrett White	Fr
OL	89	Stephen Jeffers	Sr
OL	92	Jordan Hanson	Jr
OL	96	Tyler Wilson	Fr
OL	N/A	Braxton Isaac	Jr

Defense

Pos.	#	Name	Class
DB	9	Markus Smith	Sr
DL	10	Reggie Coates	So
LB	11	Burton De Koning	So
DB	15	L.J. Jackson	Fr
DB	16	Kaodi Dike	Fr
DB	18	Bryson Keeton	So
DB	19	Evan Favors	Jr
DB	19	Jaden Sawyer	Fr
DB	20	Chris Ayiyi	Jr
DB	22	Keith Fuetsch	Sr
DB	23	Nigel Haikins	Jr
DB	24	Charles Garrett	Jr
DB	25	Bryan Lane Jr.	So
DB	32	Arthur Forrest II	Sr
LB	35	Lorenzo Devers	So
DB	36	Frank Schnicker	Fr
LB	39	Trent Mahler	Fr
DB	42	Julian Brooks	Fr
DB	43	Gabe Lee	Jr
LB	44	Danny DeCarlo	Sr
DB	44	Dustin Treick	Fr
DL	45	Cortez Woods	Sr
DB	46	Soni Mailei	So
LB	48	Travis Hansen	Jr
LB	49	Jordan Dobrich	So
LB	50	Jonathan McNeal	Jr
LB	51	Colton Concellos	Fr
LB	52	Trevor Taft	Jr
DL	53	Brock Hekking	Jr
LB	54	Fie Faaituala	Jr
DL	55	Rykeem Yates	So
LB	56	Alex Bertrando	Fr
LB	57	Josh Wiley	Sr
DL	58	Nolan Dambacher	Fr
DL	59	Thomas Newton	Fr
DL	71	Kevin Sundberg	Fr
DL	78	Adam Rockwell	So
DB	88	Giles Chapman	So
DL	90	Tyler Houk	Jr
DL	91	Jake Peppard	Jr
DL	94	Lenny Jones	So
DL	95	Fred Lavulo	Sr
DL	98	Jack Reynoso	Sr
DL	99	Beau Hershberger	Fr
DB	N/A	Tere Calloway	Fr
LB	N/A	Matthew Lyons	So
DB	N/A	Elijah Mitchell	Fr
LB	N/A	Alec Moreno	Fr
DL	N/A	Dupree Roberts-Jordan	Jr
DL	N/A	Ian Seau	So
LB	N/A	Travis Wilson	Fr

Special teams

Pos.	#	Name	Class
PK	16	Robert Otis	So
P	37	Chase Tenpenny	Sr
PK	46	Colin Ditsworth	Jr
P	69	Alex Boy	So
LS	71	Cody Block	Fr
PK	N/A	Brent Zuzo	Fr

Head coach

- Brian Polian

Coordinators/assistant coaches

- Nick Rolovich – Offensive coordinator/quarterbacks
- Scottie Hazelton – Co–Defensive coordinator/linebackers
- Bill Teerlinck – Co–Defensive coordinator/defensive line
- Jim Hofher – Assistant head coach/wide receivers
- Larry Lewis – Special teams coordinator/running backs
- Lester Erb – Running backs/special teams
- Mike Bradeson – Recruiting coordinator/safeties
- Ron Hudson – Offensive line
- James Spady – Tight ends/assistant offensive Line
- Cheston Blackshear – Tight ends
- Ricky Thomas – Cornerbacks
- Pat Denecke – Graduate assistant (Defense)
- Nate Dolan – Graduate assistant (Defense)
- Ashley Lelie – Graduate assistant (Offense)

Support staff

- David Fox – Director of football administration
- Andy Vaughn – Director of football and recruiting operations

Legend

- (C) Team captain
- (S) Suspended
- (I) Ineligible
- Injured
- Redshirt

Roster
Last update: February 3, 2021

== Players in the 2014 NFL draft ==
Player	Position	Round	Pick	NFL club
Joel Bitonio	OL	2	35	Cleveland Browns
