= 2015 Nevada Wolf Pack football team =

American college football season

2015 Nevada Wolf Pack football

Arizona Bowl champion

Arizona Bowl, W 28–23 vs. Colorado State
- Conference: Mountain West Conference
- West Division
- Record: 7–6 (4–4 MW)
- Head coach: Brian Polian (3rd season)
- Offensive coordinator: Nick Rolovich (4th season)
- Offensive scheme: Pistol
- Co-defensive coordinators: Scott Boone (2nd season); Bill Teerlinck (3rd season)
- Base defense: 4–3
- Home stadium: Mackay Stadium

2015 Mountain West Conference football standings
	Conf.			Overall
Team	W		L	W		L
Mountain Division
Air Force x	6	–	2	8	–	6
New Mexico	5	–	3	7	–	6
Utah State	5	–	3	6	–	7
Boise State	5	–	3	9	–	4
Colorado State	5	–	3	7	–	6
Wyoming	2	–	6	2	–	10
West Division
San Diego State x$	8	–	0	11	–	3
Nevada	4	–	4	7	–	6
San Jose State	4	–	4	6	–	7
Fresno State	2	–	6	3	–	9
UNLV	2	–	6	3	–	9
Hawaii	0	–	8	3	–	10
Championship: San Diego State 27, Air Force 24
$ – Conference champion; x – Division champion/co-champions; Rankings from AP Poll

The 2015 Nevada Wolf Pack football team represented the University of Nevada, Reno in the 2015 NCAA Division I FBS football season. The Wolf Pack were led by third–year head coach Brian Polian and played their home games at Mackay Stadium. They were members of the West Division of the Mountain West Conference. They finished the season 7–6 and 4–4 in Mountain West play to finish in a tie for second place in the West Division. They were invited to the inaugural Arizona Bowl where they defeated fellow Mountain West member Colorado State.

== Preseason ==
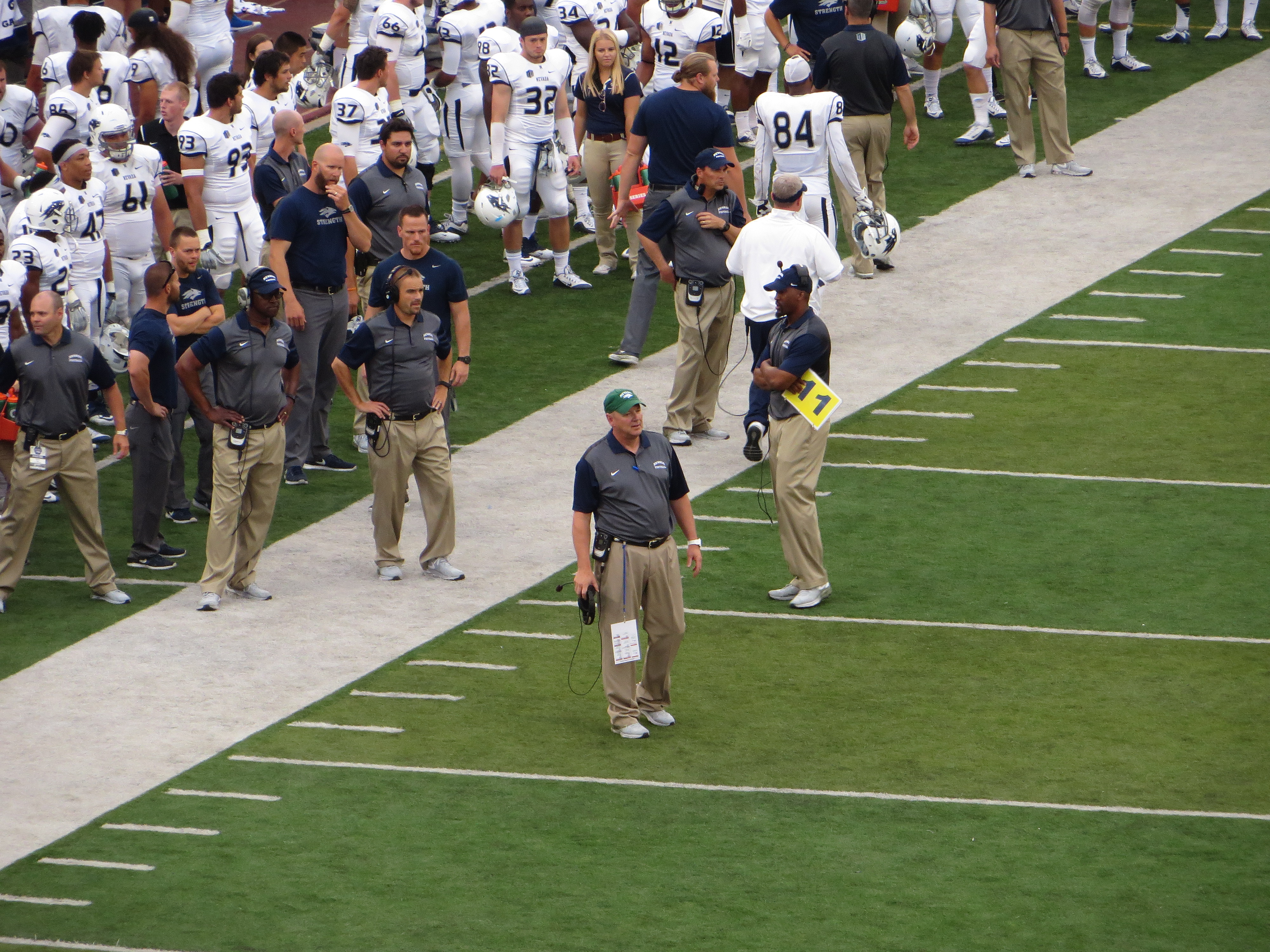
Nevada on the Chris Ault Field vs. Arizona on September 12, 2015 at Mackay Stadium in Reno, Nevada

=== Mountain West media days ===
The Mountain West media days were held on July 28–29, 2015, at the Cosmopolitan in Paradise, Nevada.

=== Media poll ===
The preseason poll was released on July 28, 2015. The Wolf Pack were predicted to finish in third place in the MW West Division.

=== Preseason All–Mountain West Team ===
The Wolf Pack had two players selected to the preseason All–Mountain West Team; one from the defense and one from the specialists.

Defense

Ian Seau – DL

Specialists

Alex Boy – P

== Schedule ==
Date	Time	Opponent	Site	TV	Result	Attendance
September 3	7:00 p.m.	UC Davis*	Mackay Stadium; Reno, NV	Campus Insiders	W 31–17	21,483
September 12	4:00 p.m.	No. 22 Arizona*	Mackay Stadium; Reno, NV	CBSSN	L 20–44	24,355
September 19	9:00 a.m.	at No. 17 Texas A&M*	Kyle Field; College Station, TX	SECN	L 27–44	102,591
September 26	12:30 p.m.	at Buffalo*	University at Buffalo Stadium; Amherst, NY	ESPN3	W 24–21	19,072
October 3	4:00 p.m.	UNLV	Mackay Stadium; Reno, NV (Fremont Cannon)	Campus Insiders	L 17–23	29,551
October 10	4:00 p.m.	New Mexico	Mackay Stadium; Reno, NV	Campus Insiders	W 35–17	20,426
October 17	12:00 p.m.	at Wyoming	War Memorial Stadium; Laramie, WY	ESPN3	L 21–28	17,026
October 24	1:00 p.m.	Hawaii^{†}	Mackay Stadium; Reno, NV	Campus Insiders, Oceanic PPV	W 30–20	19,992
November 5	7:30 p.m.	at Fresno State	Bulldog Stadium; Fresno, CA	ESPN2	W 30–16	25,476
November 14	1:00 p.m.	San Jose State	Mackay Stadium; Reno, NV	Campus Insiders	W 37–34 ^{OT}	17,215
November 21	12:30 p.m.	at Utah State	Maverik Stadium; Logan, UT	ESPN3	L 27–31	18,922
November 28	7:45 p.m.	at San Diego State	Qualcomm Stadium; San Diego, CA	ESPN2	L 14–31	22,939
December 29	4:30 p.m.	vs. Colorado State*	Arizona Stadium; Tucson, AZ (Arizona Bowl)	ASN, Campus Insiders	W 28–23	20,425
*Non-conference game; ^{†}Homecoming; Rankings from AP Poll released prior to the game; All times are in Pacific time

== Personnel ==
2015 Nevada Wolf Pack football team roster
Players
Coaches
Offense

Pos.	#	Name	Class
WR	2	Dominic Christian	Fr
RB	6	Don Jackson	Sr
QB	11	Hunter Fralick	Fr
QB	12	Hasaan Henderson	Jr
QB	13	Cristian Solano	Fr
QB	14	Dante Mays	So
QB	15	Tyler Stewart (C)	Jr
QB	16	Jake Young	Fr
WR	17	Brendan O'Leary-Orange	Fr
WR	18	Rodney Lawson	Jr
WR	19	Wyatt Demps	So
RB	20	James Butler	So
WR	22	Jimbo Davis IV	So
RB	23	Kelton Moore	Fr
WR	23	Brandon Thompson	Fr
WR	28	Jason Elenberger	Fr
WR	29	Malcom Lee	Fr
WR	31	Randy Uzoma	Jr
RB	33	Blake Wright	Fr
RB	34	Brett Kokesh	Fr
TE	35	Trae Carter-Wells	Fr
DL	39	Ricky Thomas Jr.	Fr
TE	43	Colin Flannery	Fr
TE	44	Kori Collons	Fr
TE	45	Austin Carrow	Jr
OL	53	Derrick Stom	Jr
OL	54	Gannon Laidlaw	Fr
OL	57	David Zavala	Fr
OL	60	Adam Khouri	So
OL	61	Joey Anglemire	So
OL	62	Nathan Goltry	Jr
OL	63	Daren Echeveria	Fr
OL	64	Shane Cannon	So
OL	65	Clifford Porter	Fr
OL	68	Brent Roling	Sr
OL	69	Cody DeHaan	Fr
OL	70	Humberto Lopez	Jr
OL	71	Isiah Clethen	So
OL	72	Jeremy Macauley	Jr
OL	73	Austin Corbett	So
OL	74	Ilya Lopez	So
OL	76	Austin McNinch	Jr
OL	77	Ziad Damanhoury	So
OL	79	Jacob Henry	Jr
WR	80	Devin Porter	Fr
WR	81	Victor Gonzalez	Fr
WR	82	Tucker Melcher	So
WR	83	Andrew Celis	Fr
WR	84	Jerico Richardson	Jr
TE	85	Matt Moen	So
TE	86	Brandon Scott	Fr
WR	87	Brayden Sanchez	Jr
TE	88	Evan Faunce	So
WR	88	Marty Hargrove	Fr
TE	89	Kameron Richardson	Jr
OL	91	Kalei Meyer	Fr
OL	97	Salesa Faraimo	Jr

Defense

Pos.	#	Name	Class
DB	4	Austin Kafentzis	Fr
LB	5	Fie Faaituala	Sr
LB	7	Gabriel Sewell	Fr
DL	8	Ian Seau	Sr
LB	9	Matthew Lyons	Sr
DB	11	Cal Kee III	Fr
DB	15	Tully McCalister	Fr
DB	16	Jaden Sawyer	So
DB	17	Cameron Winston	Jr
DB	18	Elijah Moody	Fr
LB	19	Tyler Crandall	Fr
DB	20	Cameron Turner	Fr
LB	22	Maliek Broady	Fr
DB	22	Asauni Rufus	Fr
DB	23	Dameon Baber	Fr
LB	24	Lucas Weber	Fr
DB	25	Bryan Lane Jr.	Sr
DB	26	Kendall Johnson	So
DB	28	Elijah Mitchell	Jr
DB	29	L.J. Jackson	Jr
DB	29	E.J. Muhammad	Fr
DB	30	Tere Calloway	So
DB	32	Devoreaux Stewart	Jr
LB	34	Travis Wilson	So
LB	35	Riley Brand	Fr
DB	35	Ahki Muhammad	Fr
LB	36	Jarid Joseph	Fr
LB	37	Trent Mahler	Jr
LB	38	Jake Lacaden	Fr
DB	42	David Kruskamp	Fr
TE	47	Jarred Gipson	Jr
LB	49	Jordan Dobrich	Sr
LB	50	Austin Paulhus	Jr
LB	51	Colton Concellos	So
LB	52	Trevor Taft	Sr
DL	55	Rykeem Yates	Sr
LB	56	Alex Bertrando	Jr
DL	58	Nolan Dambacher	Jr
DL	59	Marc Ma	Fr
DL	66	Thomas Newton	So
DL	78	Adam Sagapolu	Jr
LB	90	Malik Reed	Fr
DL	92	Kevin McReynolds	Sr
DL	93	Jordan Silva	Fr
DL	94	Lenny Jones	Sr
DL	95	Patrick Choudja	So
DL	96	Hausia Sekona	Fr
DL	98	Jeremy Miller	Sr
DL	99	Korey Rush	Fr

Special teams

Pos.	#	Name	Class
PK	40	Brent Zuzo	Jr
LS	42	Wes Farnsworth	Fr
P	46	Alex Boy	Jr
PK	48	Spencer Pettit	Fr

Head coach

- Brian Polian

Coordinators/assistant coaches

- Nick Rolovich – Offensive coordinator/quarterbacks
- Scott Boone – Co–Defensive coordinator/linebackers
- Bill Teerlinck – Co–Defensive coordinator/defensive line
- Jim Hofher – Assistant head coach/wide receivers
- Lester Erb – Assistant head coach/wide receivers/running backs/special teams
- Mike Bradeson – Recruiting coordinator/safeties
- Ron Hudson – Offensive line
- Cheston Blackshear – Tight ends
- Ricky Thomas – Cornerbacks
- Pat Denecke – Graduate assistant (Defense)
- Alec Drudi – Graduate assistant (Defense)
- John Landwehr – Graduate assistant (Defense)
- Makana Garrigan – Graduate assistant (Defense)
- Steven King – Graduate assistant (Offense)
- Brad Rogers – Graduate assistant (Offense)

Support staff

- David Fox – Director of football administration
- Joda Wolfe – Director of football and recruiting operations

Legend

- (C) Team captain
- (S) Suspended
- (I) Ineligible
- Injured
- Redshirt

Roster
Last update: February 5, 2021

== Game summaries ==
=== UC Davis ===
UC Davis at Nevada

Team	1	2	3	4	Total
Aggies (Div. I FCS)	0	3	0	14	17
• Wolf Pack	7	14	3	7	31

- Date: September 3, 2015
- Location: Mackay Stadium
  Reno, NV
- Game start: 7:06 p.m. PDT
- Elapsed time: 3 hours and 6 minutes
- Game attendance: 21,483
- Game weather: Temperature: 66 °F (19 °C) • Weather: Partly Cloudy • Wind: 15 MPH
- Referee: Eddy Shelton
- TV announcers (Campus Insiders): Ryan Radtke (play–by–play) and Kevin Grimes (analyst)

Scoring summary
1	04:10	NEV	Don Jackson 1–yard run (Brent Zuzo kick) (11 plays, 75 yards, 4:35)	NEV 7–0
2	11:47	NEV	Don Jackson 7–yard run (Brent Zuzo kick) (9 plays, 80 yards, 4:27)	NEV 14–0
2	06:27	NEV	Jarred Gipson 2–yard pass from Tyler Stewart (Brent Zuzo kick) (11 plays, 80 yards, 4:13)	NEV 21–0
2	00:47	UCD	Brady Stuart 26–yard field goal (16 plays, 66 yards, 5:40)	NEV 21–3
3	00:48	NEV	Brent Zuzo 27–yard field goal (11 plays, 77 yards, 2:46)	NEV 24–3
4	06:56	UCD	Ramon Vargas 5–yard pass from Ben Scott (Brady Stuart kick) (15 plays, 77 yards, 8:45)	NEV 24–10
4	05:11	NEV	Tyler Stewart 15–yard run (Brent Zuzo kick) (4 plays, 41 yards, 1:42)	NEV 31–10
4	00:02	UCD	Ben Scott 3–yard run (Brady Stuart kick) (12 plays, 67 yards, 2:36)	NEV 31–17

Statistics	UC Davis	Nevada
First downs	22	22
Total yards	327	395
Rushing yards	89	232
Passing yards	238	163
Turnovers	0	0
Time of possession	34:07	25:53

Team	Category	Player	Statistics
UC Davis	Passing	Ben Scott	32/47, 238 yards, 1 TD
UC Davis	Rushing	Joshua Kelley	6 carries, 43 yards
UC Davis	Receiving	Justin Williams	4 receptions, 44 yards
Nevada	Passing	Tyler Stewart	13/20, 163 yards, 1 TD
Nevada	Rushing	Don Jackson	13 carries, 124 yards, 2 TDs
Nevada	Receiving	Jerico Richardson	3 receptions, 66 yards

=== Arizona ===
Arizona at Nevada

Team	1	2	3	4	Total
• No. 22 Wildcats	14	7	13	10	44
Wolf Pack	3	10	0	7	20

- Date: September 12, 2015
- Location: Mackay Stadium
  Reno, NV
- Game start: 4:09 p.m. PDT
- Elapsed time: 3 hours and 41 minutes
- Game attendance: 24,355
- Game weather: Temperature: 94 °F (34 °C) • Weather: Hazy • Wind: E 5 MPH
- Referee: Marvel July
- TV announcers (CBSSN): Rich Waltz (play–by–play), Adam Archuleta (analyst) and Cassie Gallo (sideline)

Scoring summary
1	13:01	ARIZ	Johnny Jackson 9–yard pass from Anu Solomon (Casey Skowron kick) (2 plays, 16 yards, 0:34)	ARIZ 7–0
1	09:33	ARIZ	Nick Wilson 3–yard run (Casey Skowron kick) (7 plays, 77 yards, 2:02)	ARIZ 14–0
1	05:08	NEV	Brent Zuzo 28–yard field goal (11 plays, 64 yards, 4:25)	ARIZ 14–3
2	09:14	NEV	Jerico Richardson 5–yard pass from Tyler Stewart (Brent Zuzo kick) (14 plays, 81 yards, 5:28)	ARIZ 14–10
2	03:56	ARIZ	Nick Wilson 3–yard run (Casey Skowron kick) (5 plays, 40 yards, 1:10)	ARIZ 21–10
2	00:00	NEV	Brent Zuzo 41–yard field goal (8 plays, 26 yards, 0:56)	ARIZ 21–13
3	10:41	ARIZ	Jamardre Harris-Cobb 1–yard pass from Anu Solomon (Casey Skowron kick failed) (7 plays, 58 yards, 1:59)	ARIZ 27–13
3	03:56	ARIZ	Nick Wilson 6–yard run (Casey Skowron kick) (9 plays, 77 yards, 2:30)	ARIZ 34–13
4	13:34	ARIZ	Jerrard Randall 57–yard run (Casey Skowron kick) (2 plays, 56 yards, 0:33)	ARIZ 41–13
4	10:08	NEV	Hasaan Henderson 2–yard pass from Tyler Stewart (Brent Zuzo kick) (9 plays, 66 yards, 3:19)	ARIZ 41–22
4	03:35	ARIZ	Casey Skowron 46–yard field goal (10 plays, 46 yards, 6:33)	ARIZ 44–22

Statistics	Arizona	Nevada
First downs	25	15
Total yards	571	328
Rushing yards	290	168
Passing yards	281	160
Turnovers	4	1
Time of possession	27:42	32:18

Team	Category	Player	Statistics
Arizona	Passing	Anu Solomon	24/34, 276 yards, 2 TDs
Arizona	Rushing	Nick Wilson	21 carries, 183 yards, 3 TDs
Arizona	Receiving	Cayleb Jones	5 receptions, 100 yards
Nevada	Passing	Tyler Stewart	18/32, 160 yards, 2 TDs, 1 INT
Nevada	Rushing	Don Jackson	24 carries, 91 yards
Nevada	Receiving	Hasaan Henderson	6 receptions, 58 yards, 1 TD

=== At Texas A&M ===
Nevada at Texas A&M

Team	1	2	3	4	Total
Wolf Pack	7	3	10	7	27
• No. 17 Aggies	14	10	14	6	44

- Date: September 19, 2015
- Location: Kyle Field
  College Station, TX
- Game start: 11:01 a.m. CDT
- Elapsed time: 3 hours and 35 minutes
- Game attendance: 102,591
- Game weather: Temperature: 83 °F (28 °C) • Weather: Sunny • Wind: Calm
- Referee: David Smith
- TV announcers (SECN): Tom Hart (play–by–play), Andre Ware (analyst) and Laura Rutledge (sideline)

Scoring summary
1	12:41	TAMU	Kyle Allen 1–yard run (Taylor Bertolet kick) (7 plays, 73 yards, 2:19)	TAMU 7–0
1	03:28	NEV	Don Jackson 31–yard run (Brent Zuzo kick) (4 plays, 40 yards, 2:23)	TIE 7–7
1	01:07	TAMU	Speedy Noil 10–yard pass from Kyle Allen (Taylor Bertolet kick) (6 plays, 65 yards, 2:21)	TAMU 14–7
2	13:30	NEV	Brent Zuzo 28–yard field goal (9 plays, 64 yards, 2:37)	TAMU 14–10
2	12:23	TAMU	Josh Reynolds 25–yard pass from Kyle Allen (Taylor Bertolet kick) (3 plays, 78 yards, 1:07)	TAMU 21–10
2	01:05	TAMU	Taylor Bertolet 32–yard field goal (5 plays, 18 yards, 1:17)	TAMU 24–10
3	13:45	TAMU	Josh Reynolds 10–yard pass from Kyle Allen (Taylor Bertolet kick) (4 plays, 28 yards, 1:10)	TAMU 31–10
3	08:58	NEV	Brent Zuzo 27–yard field goal (4 plays, 4 yards, 2:01)	TAMU 31–13
3	04:02	TAMU	Jeremy Tabuyo 15–yard pass from Kyle Allen (Taylor Bertolet kick) (10 plays, 85 yards, 3:02)	TAMU 38–13
3	01:20	NEV	Hasaan Henderson 27–yard pass from Tyler Stewart (Brent Zuzo kick) (8 plays, 75 yards, 2:42)	TAMU 38–20
4	13:57	TAMU	Taylor Bertolet 21–yard field goal (9 plays, 70 yards, 2:23)	TAMU 41–20
4	09:33	NEV	Don Jackson 9–yard pass from Tyler Stewart (Brent Zuzo kick) (12 plays, 75 yards, 4:24)	TAMU 41–27
4	04:40	TAMU	Taylor Bertolet 37–yard field goal (9 plays, 61 yards, 3:17)	TAMU 44–27

Statistics	Nevada	Texas A&M
First downs	19	30
Total yards	359	535
Rushing yards	153	233
Passing yards	206	302
Turnovers	1	3
Time of possession	34:11	25:49

Team	Category	Player	Statistics
Nevada	Passing	Tyler Stewart	16/29, 206 yards, 2 TDs, 1 INT
Nevada	Rushing	James Butler	17 carries, 107 yards
Nevada	Receiving	Hasaan Henderson	5 receptions, 69 yards, 1 TD
Texas A&M	Passing	Kyle Allen	18/31, 270 yards, 4 TDs, 1 INT
Texas A&M	Rushing	Tra Carson	22 carries, 137 yards
Texas A&M	Receiving	Christian Kirk	6 receptions, 120 yards

=== At Buffalo ===
Nevada at Buffalo

Team	1	2	3	4	Total
• Wolf Pack	14	3	0	7	24
Bulls	7	3	3	8	21

- Date: September 26, 2015
- Location: UB Stadium
  Amherst, NY
- Game start: 3:34 p.m. EDT
- Elapsed time: 3 hours and 16 minutes
- Game attendance: 19,072
- Game weather: Temperature: 72 °F (22 °C) • Weather: Mostly Cloudy • Wind: ENE 11 MPH
- Referee: Greg Sujack
- TV announcers (ESPN3): Doug Sherman (play–by–play) and Josh Cribbs (analyst)

Scoring summary
1	11:11	NEV	Matt Weiser 41–yard pass from Joe Licata (Adam Mitcheson kick) (5 plays, 69 yards, 1:53)	UB 7–0
1	03:07	NEV	James Butler 5–yard run (Brent Zuzo kick) (2 plays, 96 yards, 0:40)	TIE 7–7
1	00:12	NEV	Don Jackson 55–yard run (Brent Zuzo kick) (4 plays, 62 yards, 1:54)	NEV 14–7
2	11:11	UB	Adam Mitcheson 33–yard field goal (11 plays, 59 yards, 4:01)	NEV 14–10
2	08:41	NEV	Brent Zuzo 38–yard field goal (9 plays, 54 yards, 2:30)	NEV 17–10
3	06:56	UB	Adam Mitcheson 43–yard field goal (8 plays, 37 yards, 3:43)	NEV 17–13
4	10:25	NEV	Don Jackson 10–yard run (Brent Zuzo kick) (12 plays, 80 yards, 5:27)	NEV 24–13
4	08:06	UB	Collin Lisa 5–yard pass from Joe Licata (Marcus McGill rush) (8 plays, 75 yards, 2:19)	NEV 24–21

Statistics	Nevada	Buffalo
First downs	15	23
Total yards	379	487
Rushing yards	289	149
Passing yards	90	338
Turnovers	0	2
Time of possession	26:58	33:02

Team	Category	Player	Statistics
Nevada	Passing	Tyler Stewart	12/21, 90 yards
Nevada	Rushing	James Butler	16 carries, 177 yards, 1 TD
Nevada	Receiving	Hasaan Henderson	2 receptions, 28 yards
Buffalo	Passing	Joe Licata	28/46, 338 yards, 2 TDs, 2 INTs
Buffalo	Rushing	Jordan Johnson	13 carries, 79 yards
Buffalo	Receiving	Matt Weiser	10 receptions, 131 yards, 1 TD

=== UNLV ===
UNLV at Nevada
(Battle for the Fremont Cannon / Governor's Series)

Team	1	2	3	4	Total
• Rebels	7	6	0	10	23
Wolf Pack	0	0	3	14	17

- Date: October 3, 2015
- Location: Mackay Stadium
  Reno, NV
- Game start: 4:05 p.m. PDT
- Elapsed time: 3 hours and 19 minutes
- Game attendance: 29,551
- Game weather: Temperature: 72 °F (22 °C) • Weather: Partly Cloudy • Wind: W 14 MPH
- Referee: Brandon Cruse
- TV announcers (Campus Insiders): Ari Wolfe (play–by–play) and Darius Walker (analyst)

Scoring summary
1	08:58	UNLV	Keith Whitely 37–yard run (Nicolai Bornand kick) (11 plays, 81 yards, 6:02)	UNLV 7–0
2	00:30	UNLV	Kurt Palandech 12–yard run (Nicolai Bornand kick failed) (7 plays, 73 yards, 0:57)	UNLV 13–0
3	10:35	NEV	Brent Zuzo 27–yard field goal (11 plays, 62 yards, 4:20)	UNLV 13–3
4	10:47	NEV	Jerico Richardson 22–yard pass from Tyler Stewart (Brent Zuzo kick) (9 plays, 78 yards, 3:23)	UNLV 13–10
4	08:27	UNLV	Ryan McAleenan 52–yard interception (Nicolai Bornand kick)	UNLV 20–10
4	04:50	NEV	Don Jackson 1–yard run (Brent Zuzo kick) (9 plays, 75 yards, 3:37)	UNLV 20–17
4	01:53	UNLV	Nicolai Bornand 45–yard field goal (4 plays, 5 yards, 0:26)	UNLV 23–17

Statistics	UNLV	Nevada
First downs	18	24
Total yards	301	343
Rushing yards	167	141
Passing yards	134	202
Turnovers	0	1
Time of possession	32:31	27:29

Team	Category	Player	Statistics
UNLV	Passing	Blake Decker	7/11, 86 yards, 1 INT
UNLV	Rushing	Keith Whitely	16 carries, 76 yards, 1 TD
UNLV	Receiving	Devonte Boyd	4 receptions, 39 yards
Nevada	Passing	Tyler Stewart	20/44, 202 yards, 1 TD, 1 INT
Nevada	Rushing	Tyler Stewart	11 carries, 61 yards
Nevada	Receiving	Jerico Richardson	8 receptions, 87 yards, 1 TD

=== New Mexico ===
New Mexico at Nevada
(Battle of the Wolves)

Team	1	2	3	4	Total
Lobos	3	7	0	7	17
• Wolf Pack	0	14	7	14	35

- Date: October 10, 2015
- Location: Mackay Stadium
  Reno, NV
- Game start: 4:00 p.m. PDT
- Elapsed time: 2 hours and 54 minutes
- Game attendance: 20,426
- Game weather: Temperature: 82 °F (28 °C) • Weather: Clear and Sunny • Wind: SSW 19 MPH
- Referee: Eddy Shelton
- TV announcers (Campus Insiders): Ari Wolfe (play–by–play) and Darius Walker (analyst)

Scoring summary
1	09:36	NM	Zack Rogers 42–yard field goal (4 plays, 0 yards, 1:11)	NM 3–0
2	08:54	NEV	Tyler Stewart 13–yard run (Brent Zuzo kick) (8 plays, 80 yards, 3:09)	NEV 7–3
2	03:42	NM	Teriyon Gipson 38–yard run (Zack Rogers kick) (10 plays, 75 yards, 5:12)	NM 10–7
2	02:37	NEV	James Butler 15–yard run (Brent Zuzo kick) (4 plays, 75 yards, 1:05)	NEV 14–10
3	03:00	NEV	Tyler Stewart 10–yard run (Brent Zuzo kick) (9 plays, 83 yards, 3:51)	NEV 21–10
4	14:47	NM	Nias Martin 77–yard fumble recovery (Zack Rogers kick)	NEV 21–17
4	13:02	NEV	Jarred Gipson 8–yard pass from Tyler Stewart (Brent Zuzo kick) (4 plays, 75 yards, 1:40)	NEV 28–17
4	01:18	NEV	Jerico Richardson 27–yard pass from Tyler Stewart (Brent Zuzo kick) (13 plays, 80 yards, 6:42)	NEV 35–17

Statistics	New Mexico	Nevada
First downs	14	30
Total yards	273	517
Rushing yards	135	351
Passing yards	138	166
Turnovers	2	4
Time of possession	28:31	31:29

Team	Category	Player	Statistics
New Mexico	Passing	Austin Apodaca	10/12, 82 yards, 1 INT
New Mexico	Rushing	Teriyon Gipson	11 carries, 68 yards, 1 TD
New Mexico	Receiving	Dameon Gamblin	8 receptions, 71 yards
Nevada	Passing	Tyler Stewart	16/19, 166 yards, 2 TDs
Nevada	Rushing	Don Jackson	23 carries, 155 yards
Nevada	Receiving	Jerico Richardson	9 receptions, 121 yards, 1 TD

=== At Wyoming ===
Nevada at Wyoming

Team	1	2	3	4	Total
Wolf Pack	0	7	7	7	21
• Cowboys	0	21	7	0	28

- Date: October 17, 2015
- Location: War Memorial Stadium
  Laramie, WY
- Game start: 2:05 p.m. MDT
- Elapsed time: 3 hours and 10 minutes
- Game attendance: 17,026
- Game weather: Temperature: 70 °F (21 °C) • Weather: Sunny • Wind: S 3 MPH
- Referee: David Alvarez
- TV announcers (ESPN3): Trey Bender (play–by–play) and Chad Brown (analyst)

Scoring summary
2	10:28	WYO	Jacob Hollister 18–yard pass from Cameron Coffman (Tristan Bailey kick) (8 plays, 65 yards, 3:34)	WYO 7–0
2	06:10	NEV	Don Jackson 7–yard run (Brent Zuzo kick) (10 plays, 75 yards, 4:18)	TIE 7–7
2	01:30	WYO	Tanner Gentry 27–yard pass from Cameron Coffman (Tristan Bailey kick) (11 plays, 75 yards, 4:40)	WYO 14–7
2	00:27	WYO	Jake Maulhardt 12–yard pass from Cameron Coffman (Tristan Bailey kick) (4 plays, 47 yards, 0:38)	WYO 21–7
3	11:21	WYO	Kellen Overstreet 5–yard run (Tristan Bailey kick) (8 plays, 76 yards, 3:39)	WYO 28–7
3	00:56	NEV	Jarred Gipson 12–yard pass from Tyler Stewart (Brent Zuzo kick) (8 plays, 79 yards, 2:27)	WYO 28–14
4	06:36	NEV	Jerico Richardson 7–yard pass from Tyler Stewart (Brent Zuzo kick) (9 plays, 80 yards, 2:17)	WYO 28–21

Statistics	Nevada	Wyoming
First downs	27	25
Total yards	405	485
Rushing yards	118	272
Passing yards	287	213
Turnovers	1	1
Time of possession	25:15	34:45

Team	Category	Player	Statistics
Nevada	Passing	Tyler Stewart	25/41, 287 yards, 2 TDs
Nevada	Rushing	James Butler	10 carries, 51 yards
Nevada	Receiving	Hasaan Henderson	8 receptions, 112 yards
Wyoming	Passing	Cameron Coffman	18/20, 213 yards, 3 TDs
Wyoming	Rushing	Brian Hill	33 carries, 188 yards
Wyoming	Receiving	Tanner Gentry	4 receptions, 86 yards, 1 TD

=== Hawaii ===
Hawaii at Nevada

Team	1	2	3	4	Total
Rainbow Warriors	3	14	3	0	20
• Wolf Pack	0	10	3	17	30

- Date: October 24, 2015
- Location: Mackay Stadium
  Reno, NV
- Game start: 1:07 p.m. PDT
- Elapsed time: 3 hours and 9 minutes
- Game attendance: 19,992
- Game weather: Temperature: 62 °F (17 °C) • Weather: Overcast • Wind: N 2 MPH
- Referee: Scott Campbell
- TV announcers (Campus Insiders/Oceanic PPV): Robert Kekaula (play–by–play) and Rich Miano (analyst)

Scoring summary
1	06:12	UH	Rigoberto Sanchez 50–yard field goal (4 plays, 3 yards, 2:15)	UH 3–0
2	13:12	UH	Devan Stubblefield 29–yard pass from Max Wittek (Rigoberto Sanchez kick) (2 plays, 43 yards, 0:26)	UH 10–0
2	05:24	UH	Devan Stubblefield 9–yard pass from Max Wittek (Rigoberto Sanchez kick) (10 plays, 73 yards, 4:19)	UH 17–0
2	01:12	NEV	James Butler 1–yard run (Brent Zuzo kick) (9 plays, 52 yards, 4:05)	UH 17–7
2	00:53	NEV	Brent Zuzo 40–yard field goal (4 plays, 0 yards, 0:18)	UH 17–10
3	07:43	NEV	Brent Zuzo 29–yard field goal (9 plays, 60 yards, 3:32)	UH 17–13
3	04:41	UH	Rigoberto Sanchez 47–yard field goal (10 plays, 46 yards, 3:02)	UH 20–13
4	14:02	NEV	Jarred Gipson 5–yard pass from Tyler Stewart (Brent Zuzo kick) (12 plays, 75 yards, 5:39)	TIE 20–20
4	09:01	NEV	Brent Zuzo 30–yard field goal (7 plays, 25 yards, 3:56)	NEV 23–20
4	02:20	NEV	James Butler 1–yard run (Brent Zuzo kick) (4 plays, 21 yards, 1:33)	NEV 30–20

Statistics	Hawaii	Nevada
First downs	19	20
Total yards	325	372
Rushing yards	34	244
Passing yards	291	128
Turnovers	3	1
Time of possession	23:34	36:26

Team	Category	Player	Statistics
Hawaii	Passing	Max Wittek	27/40, 291 yards, 2 TDs, 3 INTs
Hawaii	Rushing	Paul Harris	16 carries, 57 yards
Hawaii	Receiving	Devan Stubblefield	8 receptions, 91 yards, 2 TDs
Nevada	Passing	Tyler Stewart	12/23, 128 yards, 1 TD, 1 INT
Nevada	Rushing	James Butler	28 carries, 134 yards, 2 TDs
Nevada	Receiving	Jarred Gipson	5 receptions, 57 yards, 1 TD

=== At Fresno State ===
Nevada at Fresno State

Team	1	2	3	4	Total
• Wolf Pack	7	10	6	7	30
Bulldogs	0	16	0	0	16

- Date: November 5, 2015
- Location: Bulldog Stadium
  Fresno, CA
- Game start: 7:32 p.m. PST
- Elapsed time: 3 hours and 20 minutes
- Game attendance: 25,476
- Game weather: Temperature: 54 °F (12 °C) • Weather: Partly Cloudy • Wind: NW 4 MPH
- Referee: Alan Eck
- TV announcers (ESPN2): Mike Couzens (play–by–play) and Tom Ramsey (analyst)

Scoring summary
1	13:08	NEV	Matthew Lyons 30–yard fumble recovery (Brent Zuzo kick)	NEV 7–0
2	10:30	FS	Kody Kroening 25–yard field goal (7 plays, 21 yards, 2:27)	NEV 7–3
2	09:02	NEV	Hasaan Henderson 73–yard pass from Tyler Stewart (Brent Zuzo kick) (3 plays, 77 yards, 1:23)	NEV 14–3
2	05:55	FS	Kilton Anderson 24–yard run (Kody Kroening kick) (9 plays, 75 yards, 3:00)	NEV 14–10
2	02:57	NEV	Brent Zuzo 47–yard field goal (10 plays, 49 yards, 2:51)	NEV 17–10
2	00:14	FS	Josiah Blandin 2–yard pass from Kilton Anderson (Kody Kroening kick failed) (14 plays, 76 yards, 2:36)	NEV 17–16
3	08:28	NEV	Brent Zuzo 30–yard field goal (12 plays, 62 yards, 6:26)	NEV 20–16
3	00:42	NEV	Brent Zuzo 25–yard field goal (13 plays, 68 yards, 6:48)	NEV 23–16
4	11:17	NEV	James Butler 59–yard run (Brent Zuzo kick) (5 plays, 73 yards, 2:19)	NEV 30–16

Statistics	Nevada	Fresno State
First downs	18	18
Total yards	498	280
Rushing yards	292	126
Passing yards	206	154
Turnovers	0	2
Time of possession	36:18	23:42

Team	Category	Player	Statistics
Nevada	Passing	Tyler Stewart	12/17, 206 yards, 1 TD, 1 INT
Nevada	Rushing	Don Jackson	21 carries, 140 yards
Nevada	Receiving	Hasaan Henderson	5 receptions, 136 yards, 1 TD
Fresno State	Passing	Kilton Anderson	12/26, 88 yards, 1 TD, 1 INT
Fresno State	Rushing	Marteze Waller	17 carries, 74 yards
Fresno State	Receiving	Jamire Jordan	3 receptions, 50 yards

=== San Jose State ===
San Jose State at Nevada

Team	1	2	3	4	OT	Total
Spartans	0	14	7	10	3	34
• Wolf Pack	7	3	7	14	6	37

- Date: November 14, 2015
- Location: Mackay Stadium
  Reno, NV
- Game start: 1:05 p.m. PST
- Elapsed time: 3 hours and 13 minutes
- Game attendance: 17,215
- Game weather: Temperature: 54 °F (12 °C) • Weather: Clear and Sunny • Wind: Slight
- Referee: Daniel Romeo
- TV announcers (Campus Insiders): Ari Wolfe (play–by–play) and Darius Walker (analyst)

Scoring summary
1	08:48	NEV	Jerico Richardson 5–yard pass from Tyler Stewart (Brent Zuzo kick) (9 plays, 58 yards, 4:15)	NEV 7–0
2	07:54	NEV	Brent Zuzo 27–yard field goal (16 plays, 70 yards, 6:28)	NEV 10–0
2	04:38	SJSU	Tim Crawley 0–yard fumble recovery (Austin Lopez kick)	NEV 10–7
2	00:23	SJSU	Tim Crawley 13–yard pass from Kenny Potter (Austin Lopez kick) (9 plays, 63 yards, 3:19)	SJSU 14–10
3	11:55	SJSU	Billy Freeman 23–yard pass from Kenny Potter (Austin Lopez kick) (4 plays, 55 yards, 1:38)	SJSU 21–10
3	09:37	NEV	James Butler 58–yard run (Brent Zuzo kick) (6 plays, 75 yards, 2:18)	SJSU 21–17
4	14:54	NEV	Hassan Henderson 24–yard pass from Tyler Stewart (Brent Zuzo kick) (12 plays, 69 yards, 6:08)	NEV 24–21
4	11:21	SJSU	Tim Crawley 13–yard pass from Kenny Potter (Austin Lopez kick) (8 plays, 75 yards, 3:33)	SJSU 28–24
4	02:49	SJSU	Austin Lopez 37–yard field goal (15 plays, 60 yards, 7:00)	SJSU 31–24
4	00:36	NEV	Don Jackson 2–yard run (Brent Zuzo kick) (13 plays, 75 yards, 2:13)	TIE 31–31
OT	15:00	SJSU	Austin Lopez 35–yard field goal (4 plays, 0 yards, 0:00)	SJSU 34–31
OT	15:00	NEV	Jarred Gipson 11–yard pass from Tyler Stewart (Brent Zuzo kick) (3 plays, 25 yards, 0:00)	NEV 37–34

Statistics	San Jose State	Nevada
First downs	21	23
Total yards	433	409
Rushing yards	247	235
Passing yards	186	174
Turnovers	1	0
Time of possession	30:55	29:05

Team	Category	Player	Statistics
San Jose State	Passing	Kenny Potter	15/23, 186 yards, 3 TDs
San Jose State	Rushing	Kenny Potter	19 carries, 116 yards
San Jose State	Receiving	Hansell Wilson	4 receptions, 49 yards
Nevada	Passing	Tyler Stewart	16/26, 174 yards, 3 TDs
Nevada	Rushing	James Butler	16 carries, 119 yards, 1 TD
Nevada	Receiving	Jarred Gipson	3 receptions, 55 yards, 1 TD

=== At Utah State ===
Nevada at Utah State

Team	1	2	3	4	Total
Wolf Pack	7	14	6	0	27
• Aggies	0	7	14	10	31

- Date: November 21, 2015
- Location: Maverik Stadium
  Logan, UT
- Game start: 1:35 p.m. MST
- Elapsed time: 3 hours and 21 minutes
- Game attendance: 18,922
- Game weather: Temperature: 34 °F (1 °C) • Weather: Clear and Sunny • Wind: N 4 MPH
- Referee: Scott Campbell
- TV announcers (ESPN3): Trey Bender (play–by–play) and Forrest Conoly (analyst)

Scoring summary
1	07:36	NEV	Jordan Dobrich 25–yard interception (Brent Zuzo kick)	NEV 7–0
2	08:22	NEV	Tyler Stewart 2–yard run (Brent Zuzo kick) (4 plays, 21 yards, 2:10)	NEV 14–0
2	08:07	USU	Hunter Sharp 96–yard kickoff return (Jake Thompson kick)	NEV 14–7
2	02:16	NEV	James Butler 33–yard run (Brent Zuzo kick) (11 plays, 72 yards, 5:45)	NEV 21–7
3	14:10	NEV	James Butler 60–yard run (Brent Zuzo kick blocked) (2 plays, 65 yards, 0:50)	NEV 27–7
3	09:05	USU	Devante Mays 5–yard run (Jake Thompson kick) (14 plays, 75 yards, 5:05)	NEV 27–14
3	06:25	USU	Devante Mays 2–yard run (Jake Thompson kick) (6 plays, 68 yards, 1:41)	NEV 27–21
4	06:55	USU	Kyler Fackrell 0–yard fumble recovery (Jake Thompson kick)	USU 28–27
4	00:35	USU	Jake Thompson 42–yard field goal (7 plays, 32 yards, 2:22)	USU 31–27

Statistics	Nevada	Utah State
First downs	15	19
Total yards	264	313
Rushing yards	209	204
Passing yards	55	109
Turnovers	4	5
Time of possession	30:39	29:21

Team	Category	Player	Statistics
Nevada	Passing	Tyler Stewart	8/18, 55 yards
Nevada	Rushing	James Butler	17 carries, 139 yards, 2 TDs
Nevada	Receiving	Jerico Richardson	5 receptions, 42 yards
Utah State	Passing	Chuckie Keeton	14/27, 109 yards, 1 INT
Utah State	Rushing	Devante Mays	22 carries, 133 yards, 2 TDs
Utah State	Receiving	Hunter Sharp	7 receptions, 51 yards

=== At San Diego State ===
Nevada at San Diego State

Team	1	2	3	4	Total
Wolf Pack	7	7	0	0	14
• Aztecs	14	7	3	7	31

- Date: November 28, 2015
- Location: Qualcomm Stadium
  San Diego, CA
- Game start: 7:50 p.m. PST
- Elapsed time: 3 hours and 10 minutes
- Game attendance: 22,939
- Game weather: Temperature: 53 °F (12 °C) • Weather: Clear and Cool • Wind: Calm
- Referee: Reggie Smith
- TV announcers (ESPN2): Mark Neely (play–by–play) and David Diaz-Infante (analyst)

Scoring summary
1	10:30	SDSU	Donnel Pumphrey 1–yard run (Donny Hageman kick) (9 plays, 67 yards, 4:30)	SDSU 7–0
1	08:24	NEV	Hunter Fralick 4–yard run (Brent Zuzo kick) (5 plays, 75 yards, 2:06)	TIE 7–7
1	04:20	SDSU	Rashaad Penny 14–yard run (Donny Hageman kick) (8 plays, 82 yards, 4:04)	SDSU 14–7
2	02:42	NEV	Jerico Richardson 0–yard fumble recovery (Brent Zuzo kick)	TIE 14–14
2	01:21	SDSU	Donnel Pumphrey 72–yard run (Donny Hageman kick) (3 plays, 62 yards, 1:21)	SDSU 21–14
3	02:58	SDSU	Donny Hageman 29–yard field goal (6 plays, 18 yards, 2:27)	SDSU 24–14
4	13:36	SDSU	Chase Price 2–yard run (Donny Hageman kick) (7 plays, 31 yards, 3:32)	SDSU 31–14

Statistics	Nevada	San Diego State
First downs	10	17
Total yards	263	408
Rushing yards	35	320
Passing yards	228	88
Turnovers	5	0
Time of possession	26:36	33:24

Team	Category	Player	Statistics
Nevada	Passing	Tyler Stewart	12/23, 228 yards, 2 INT
Nevada	Rushing	Don Jackson	16 carries, 49 yards
Nevada	Receiving	Jerico Richardson	6 receptions, 106 yards
San Diego State	Passing	Christian Chapman	6/9, 44 yards
San Diego State	Rushing	Donnel Pumphrey	23 carries, 154 yards, 2 TDs
San Diego State	Receiving	Rashaad Penny	2 receptions, 28 yards

=== Vs. Colorado State (Arizona Bowl) ===
Nevada vs. Colorado State
(Arizona Bowl)

Team	1	2	3	4	Total
• Wolf Pack	3	16	3	6	28
Rams	0	13	7	3	23

- Date: December 29, 2015
- Location: Arizona Stadium
  Tucson, AZ
- Game start: 5:37 p.m. MST
- Elapsed time: 3 hours and 26 minutes
- Game attendance: 20,425
- Game weather: Temperature: 44 °F (7 °C) • Weather: Partly Cloudy • Wind: NNW 5 MPH
- Referee: Tracy Jones
- TV announcers (ASN/Campus Insiders): Ron Thulin (play–by–play), Doug Chapman (analyst), Monica McNutt (sideline) and Shae Peppler (sideline)

Scoring summary
1	07:21	NEV	Brent Zuzo 19–yard field goal (10 plays, 39 yards, 5:19)	NEV 3–0
2	14:13	NEV	Brent Zuzo 37–yard field goal (8 plays, 53 yards, 4:53)	NEV 6–0
2	07:04	CSU	Nick Stevens 1–yard run (Wyatt Bryan kick) (2 plays, 39 yards, 0:39)	CSU 7–6
2	06:38	NEV	James Butler 77–yard run (Brent Zuzo kick) (2 plays, 82 yards, 0:20)	NEV 13–7
2	01:46	CSU	Wyatt Bryan 20–yard field goal (11 plays, 81 yards, 4:44)	NEV 13–10
2	01:33	NEV	Elijah Mitchell 96–yard kickoff return (Brent Zuzo kick failed)	NEV 19–10
2	00:08	CSU	Wyatt Bryan 29–yard field goal (13 plays, 58 yards, 1:17)	NEV 19–13
3	09:16	NEV	Brent Zuzo 40–yard field goal (12 plays, 53 yards, 5:39)	NEV 22–13
3	03:55	CSU	Jasen Oden Jr. 9–yard run (Wyatt Bryan kick) (12 plays, 75 yards, 5:21)	NEV 22–20
4	03:40	CSU	Wyatt Bryan 38–yard field goal (8 plays, 42 yards, 3:25)	CSU 23–22
4	01:06	NEV	James Butler 4–yard run (rush failed) (8 plays, 72 yards, 2:28)	NEV 28–23

The Wolf Pack and Rams are both members of the Mountain West Conference. However, they are in opposite divisions and did not play each other in the regular season in 2015. This is the first time teams from the same conference have met in a non-championship bowl game since the 1979 Orange Bowl.

Statistics	Nevada	Colorado State
First downs	18	30
Total yards	345	532
Rushing yards	271	222
Passing yards	74	310
Turnovers	0	2
Time of possession	27:30	32:30

Team	Category	Player	Statistics
Nevada	Passing	Tyler Stewart	6/13, 74 yards
Nevada	Rushing	James Butler	24 carries, 189 yards, 2 TDs
Nevada	Receiving	Jerico Richardson	4 receptions, 42 yards
Colorado State	Passing	Nick Stevens	22/42, 310 yards
Colorado State	Rushing	Izzy Matthews	12 carries, 87 yards
Colorado State	Receiving	Rashard Higgins	9 receptions, 129 yards
