= 2013 Mountain West Conference football season =

- League: NCAA Division I FBS (Football Bowl Subdivision)
- Sport: Football
- Duration: August 30, 2013–January 1, 2014
- Teams: 12
- TV partner(s): CBS Sports Network, ESPN family

2014 NFL Draft
- Top draft pick: DE DeMarcus Lawrence, Boise State
- Picked by: Dallas Cowboys, 34th overall

Regular season

Football seasons
- 2012 2014

2013 Mountain West Conference football standings
	Conf.			Overall
Team	W		L	W		L
Mountain Division
Utah State x	7	–	1	9	–	5
Boise State	6	–	2	8	–	5
Colorado State	5	–	3	8	–	6
Wyoming	3	–	5	5	–	7
New Mexico	1	–	7	3	–	9
Air Force	0	–	8	2	–	10
West Division
Fresno State x$	7	–	1	11	–	2
San Diego State	6	–	2	8	–	5
UNLV	5	–	3	7	–	6
San Jose State	5	–	3	6	–	6
Nevada	3	–	5	4	–	8
Hawaii	0	–	8	1	–	11
Championship: Fresno State 24, Utah State 17
$ – Conference champion; x – Division champion/co-champions; Rankings from AP Poll

The 2013 Mountain West Conference football season was the 15th season of college football for the Mountain West Conference (MW). In the 2013 NCAA Division I FBS football season, the MW had 12 football members: Air Force, Boise State, Colorado State, Fresno State, Hawaiʻi, Nevada, New Mexico, San Diego State, San Jose State, UNLV, Utah State, and Wyoming.

This was the third consecutive year in which the Mountain West saw changes in membership. In 2011, two of the conference's charter members, BYU (WCC and football independent) and Utah (Pac-12), left, while Boise State joined from the WAC. The following year, the MW lost TCU, members since 2005, to the Big 12, while gaining new all-sports members Fresno State and Nevada and football-only member Hawaii from the WAC. For 2013, the MW lost no schools, while adding two new full members from the WAC in San Jose State and Utah State. This brought the conference membership in football to 12, allowing the MW to split into divisions and launch a championship game.

== Preseason ==
=== Award watch lists ===
The following Mountain West players were named to preseason award watch lists.

Maxwell Award:

Chuck Bednarik Award:

John Mackey Award:

Fred Biletnikoff Award:

Bronko Nagurski Trophy:

Outland Trophy:

Jim Thorpe Award:

Lombardi Award:

Rimington Trophy:

Davey O'Brien Award:

Doak Walker Award:

Walter Camp Award:

Lott Trophy:

Lou Groza Award:

=== Mountain West media days ===
==== All–Conference Team ====
Offense

Defense

== Coaches ==
NOTE: Stats shown are before the beginning of the season

Team	Head coach	Years at school	Overall record	Record at school	MW record
Air Force	Troy Calhoun	7	49–41	49–41	29–27
Boise State	Chris Petersen	8	92–12	92–12	57–6
Colorado State	Jim McElwain	2	11–14	11–14	8-8
Fresno State	Tim DeRuyter	2	20–5	20–5	14–2
Hawaiʻi	Norm Chow	2	3-20	3-20	1–14
Nevada	Brian Polian	1	4–8	4–8	3–5
New Mexico	Bob Davie	2	42–43	42–43	2–14
San Diego State	Rocky Long	2	89–83	89–83	17–6
San José State	Ron Caragher	1	50–28	50–28	5–3
UNLV	Bobby Hauck	3	93–54	93–54	10–21
Utah State	Matt Wells	1	8–4	8–4	7–1
Wyoming	Dave Christensen	4	27–35	27–35	16–23

*first year as conference member, ^achieved as head coach of New Mexico from 99 to 08

== Rankings ==
Legend
	Increase in ranking
	Decrease in ranking
	Unranked the previous week
RV	Received votes but were not ranked in Top 25 of poll

		Pre	Wk 2	Wk 3	Wk 4	Wk 5	Wk 6	Wk 7	Wk 8	Wk 9	Wk 10	Wk 11	Wk 12	Wk 13	Wk 14	Wk 15	Wk 16	Final
Air Force	AP																	
Air Force	C																	
Air Force	Harris	Not released																
Air Force	BCS	Not released																
Boise State	AP	19	RV	RV	RV													
Boise State	C	19	RV	RV	RV				RV	RV								
Boise State	Harris	Not released								RV								
Boise State	BCS	Not released																
Colorado State	AP																	
Colorado State	C																	
Colorado State	Harris	Not released																
Colorado State	BCS	Not released																
Fresno State	AP	RV	RV	RV	RV	25	23	21	17	15	16	17	16	15	16	24	21	RV
Fresno State	C	RV	RV	RV	25	23	22	22	19	18	18	17	14	16	13	22	20	RV
Fresno State	Harris	Not released							18	18	18	17	13	14	13	22	20	
Fresno State	BCS	Not released								17	16	16	14	15	16	23	20	
Hawaiʻi	AP																	
Hawaiʻi	C																	
Hawaiʻi	Harris	Not released																
Hawaiʻi	BCS	Not released																
Nevada	AP																	
Nevada	C																	
Nevada	Harris	Not released																
Nevada	BCS	Not released																
New Mexico	AP																	
New Mexico	C																	
New Mexico	Harris	Not released																
New Mexico	BCS	Not released																
San Diego State	AP																	
San Diego State	C																	
San Diego State	Harris	Not released																
San Diego State	BCS	Not released																
San José State	AP	RV																
San José State	C	RV	RV															
San José State	Harris	Not released																
San José State	BCS	Not released																
UNLV	AP																	
UNLV	C																	
UNLV	Harris	Not released																
UNLV	BCS	Not released																
Utah State	AP	RV																RV
Utah State	C	RV	RV	RV	RV													RV
Utah State	Harris	Not released																
Utah State	BCS	Not released																
Wyoming	AP																	
Wyoming	C																	
Wyoming	Harris	Not released																
Wyoming	BCS	Not released																

== Bowl games ==
The Mountain West Conference will have agreements with the following bowls for 2012–13:

- The MW champion will receive an automatic berth in one of the five BCS bowl games if they are the highest ranked non-automatic qualifying conference champion and either of the following:
  - Ranked in the top 12 of the BCS Rankings. (Utah qualified under this criterion in 2004-05 and 2008–09, and TCU in 2009-10 and 2010–11.)
  - Ranked in the top 16 of the BCS Rankings and its ranking is higher than that of an automatic qualifying conference champion.

Pick	Name	Location	Opposing Conference	Opposing Pick
1	Maaco Bowl Las Vegas	Las Vegas, Nevada	Pac-12	5
2	Poinsettia Bowl	San Diego, California	BYU (2012), Army (2013)	–
3	Armed Forces Bowl	Fort Worth, Texas	C-USA (2012), Navy (2013)	3, –
4	New Mexico Bowl	Albuquerque, New Mexico	Pac-12	7
5	Hawai'i Bowl	Honolulu, Hawaii	C-USA	2

== Regular season ==
Index to colors and formatting
Mountain West member won
Mountain West member lost
Mountain West teams in **bold**

All dates, times, and TV are tentative and subject to change.

The Mountain West has teams in 3 different time zones. Times reflect start time in respective time zone of each team (Mountain—Air Force, Boise State, Colorado State, New Mexico, Wyoming; Pacific—Fresno State, Nevada, San Diego State, UNLV; Hawaii-Aleutian—Hawaiʻi). Conference games start times are that of the home team.

== Home attendance ==
Team	Stadium	Capacity	Game 1	Game 2	Game 3	Game 4	Game 5	Game 6	Game 7	Total	Average	% of Capacity
Air Force	Falcon Stadium	52,480	32,095	32,716	35,389	17,280	44,672	36,512	29,898	228,562	32,652	62.22%
Boise State	Bronco Stadium	37,000	33,293	36,069	35,356	35,843	33,992	—	—	174,553	34,911	94.35%
Colorado State	Hughes Stadium	34,400	14,146	19,517	26,022	21,133	15,234	—	—	96,052	19,210	56.5%
Fresno State	Bulldog Stadium	41,031	33,098	33,260	41,031	37,604	41,031	41,031	—	227,055	37,843	92.23%
Hawaiʻi	Aloha Stadium	50,000	39,058	28,755	27,146	29,752	28,530	—	—	153,241	30,648	61.30%
Nevada	Mackay Stadium	29,993	27,052	23,240	24,545	32,521	20,737	—	—	128,095	25,619	85.42%
New Mexico	University Stadium	38,634	26,311	23,639	29,749	19,739	21,833	19,376	—	140,647	23,441	60.67%
San Diego State	Qualcomm Stadium	71,294	42,978	32,133	22,475	32,707	35,890	33,161	—	199,344	33,224	46.60%
San José State	Spartan Stadium	30,456	13,136	10,533	16,123	17,932	16,876	—	—	74,600	14,920	48.99%
UNLV	Sam Boyd Stadium	36,800	26,950	10,981	13,017	22,755	15,837	15,062	—	104,602	17,434	47.38%
Utah State	Romney Stadium	25,513	25,513	25,513	25,513	21,428	20,284	—	—	118,251	23,650	47.3%
Wyoming	War Memorial Stadium	34,000	22,030	19,091	22,853	24,953	15,700	12,227	—	116,854	19,476	57.28%

== Awards and honors ==
=== All Conference teams ===
- Offensive Player of the Year: Derek Carr, SR., QB, Fresno State
- Defensive Player of the Year: Shaquil Barrett, SR., LB, Colorado State
- Special Teams Player of the Year: Carlos Wiggins, SO., KR, New Mexico
- Freshman of the Year: Tyler Winston, WR, San Jose State
- Coach of the Year: Matt Wells, Utah State

Offense:

Pos.	Name	Yr.	School	Name	Yr.	School
First Team				Second Team		
QB	Derek Carr	SR.	Fresno State	David Fales	SR.	San Jose State
WR	Davante Adams	SO.	Fresno State	Josh Harper	JR.	Fresno State
WR	Chandler Jones	SR.	San Jose State	Devante Davis	JR.	UNLV
RB	Jay Ajayi	SO.	Boise State	Kasey Carrier	SR.	New Mexico
RB	Kapri Bibbs	SO.	Colorado State	Tim Cornett	SR.	UNLV
TE	Crockett Gillmore	SR.	Colorado State	Marcel Jensen	SR.	Fresno State
OL	Charles Leno	SR.	Boise State	Matt Paradis	SR.	Boise State
OL	Weston Richburg	SR.	Colorado State	Ty Sambrailo	JR.	Colorado State
OL	Austin Wentworth	SR.	Fresno State	Bryce Quigley	SR.	San Diego State
OL	Joel Bitonio	SR.	Nevada	Nicholas Kaspar	SR.	San Jose State
OL	Tyler Larsen	SR.	Utah State	Brett Boyko	JR.	UNLV
PK	Jared Roberts	JR.	Colorado State	Austin Lopez	SO.	San Jose State
PR/KR	Carlos Wiggins	SO.	New Mexico	Isaiah Burse	SR.	Fresno State

Defense:

Pos.	Name	Yr.	School	Name	Yr.	School
First Team				Second Team		
DL	DeMarcus Lawrence	JR.	Boise State	Tyeler Davison	JR.	Fresno State
DL	Ricky Tjong-A-Tjoe	SR.	Boise State	Beau Yap	JR.	Hawai'i
DL	Brock Hekking	JR.	Nevada	B.J. Larsen	JR.	Utah State
DL	Eddie Yarbrough	SO.	Wyoming	A. J. Pataili'i	SR.	Utah State
LB	Shaquil Barrett	SR.	Colorado State	Ejiro Ederaine	SO.	Fresno State
LB	Keith Smith	SR.	San Jose State	Kyler Fackrell	SO.	Utah State
LB	Jake Doughty	SR.	Utah State	Zach Vigil	JR.	Utah State
DB	Derron Smith	JR.	Fresno State	Donte Deayon	SO.	Boise State
DB	Nat Berhe	SR.	San Diego State	Jeremy Ioane	JR.	Boise State
DB	Bené Benwikere	SR.	San Jose State	Shaq Bell	SR.	Colorado State
DB	Nevin Lawson	SR.	Utah State	Marqueston Huff	SR.	Wyoming
P	Ben Skaer	SR.	New Mexico	Chase Tenpenny	SR.	Nevada
