= 2013 Fresno State Bulldogs football team =

American college football season

2013 Fresno State Bulldogs football

Mountain West champion MW West Division champion

MW Championship Game, W 24–17 vs. Utah State

Las Vegas Bowl, L 20–45 vs. USC
- Conference: Mountain West Conference
- West Division
- Record: 11–2 (7–1 MW)
- Head coach: Tim DeRuyter (2nd season)
- Offensive coordinator: Dave Schramm (2nd season)
- Offensive scheme: Spread
- Defensive coordinator: Nick Toth (2nd season)
- Base defense: 3–4
- Home stadium: Bulldog Stadium

2013 Mountain West Conference football standings
	Conf.			Overall
Team	W		L	W		L
Mountain Division
Utah State x	7	–	1	9	–	5
Boise State	6	–	2	8	–	5
Colorado State	5	–	3	8	–	6
Wyoming	3	–	5	5	–	7
New Mexico	1	–	7	3	–	9
Air Force	0	–	8	2	–	10
West Division
Fresno State x$	7	–	1	11	–	2
San Diego State	6	–	2	8	–	5
UNLV	5	–	3	7	–	6
San Jose State	5	–	3	6	–	6
Nevada	3	–	5	4	–	8
Hawaii	0	–	8	1	–	11
Championship: Fresno State 24, Utah State 17
$ – Conference champion; x – Division champion/co-champions; Rankings from AP Poll

The 2013 Fresno State Bulldogs football team represented California State University, Fresno in the 2013 NCAA Division I FBS football season. The Bulldogs were by second-year head coach Tim DeRuyter and played their home games at Bulldog Stadium. They were members of the Mountain West Conference in the West Division. They finished the season 11–2, 7–1 in Mountain West play to win the West Division. They defeated Utah State in the inaugural Mountain West Championship Game to be crowned Mountain West champions. They were invited to the Las Vegas Bowl where they were defeated by USC.

== Personnel ==
=== Coaching staff ===
Name	Position	Seasons at Fresno State	Alma mater
Tim DeRuyter	Head coach	2nd	Air Force (1985)
Dave Schramm	Offensive coordinator/Quarterbacks	2nd	Adams State (1984)
Nick Toth	Defensive coordinator/Inside linebackers	2nd	Ohio (1999)
Ron Antoine	Wide receivers	2nd	Colorado State (1997)
David Brown	Secondary	1st	Cal Poly (1996)
Phil Earley	Recruiting Coordinator/Tight ends/Inside Receivers	2nd	Pacific Lutheran University (1980)
Pete Germano	Defensive Line/Special Teams Coordinator	2nd	Ohio Wesleyan (1982)
Cameron Norcross	Offensive Line	2nd	Nevada (2000)
Jordan Peterson	Secondary	2nd	Texas A&M (2009)
Joe Wade	Runningbacks	2nd	Linfield College (1991)
Joey Boese	Strength & Conditioning	2nd	Wisconsin (2002)
Chris Calvin	Graduate Assistant	3rd	
Michael Hodges	Graduate Assistant (Defense)	2nd	Texas A&M (2010)
Clayton Johnson	Graduate Assistant (Offense)	2nd	Nevada (2009)
Darrick Yray	Football Operations Assistant		Fresno State (2011)
David Stenklyft	Graduate Assistant/Football Operations Assistant		

== Schedule ==
Date	Time	Opponent	Rank	Site	TV	Result	Attendance
August 29	7:30 pm	Rutgers*		Bulldog Stadium; Fresno, CA	ESPNU	W 52–51 ^{OT}	33,098
September 7	7:00 pm	No. 12 (FCS) Cal Poly*		Bulldog Stadium; Fresno, CA	ESPN3	W 41–25	33,260
September 14	11:00 am	at Colorado*		Folsom Field; Boulder, CO	P12N	Cancelled^{A}	
September 20	6:00 pm	Boise State		Bulldog Stadium; Fresno, CA (Battle for the Milk Can)	ESPN	W 41–40	41,031
September 28	9:00 pm	at Hawaii	No. 25	Aloha Stadium; Honolulu, HI (rivalry)	KSEE	W 42–37	28,755
October 5	2:00 pm	at Idaho*	No. 23	Kibbie Dome; Moscow, ID	KSEE	W 61–14	14,747
October 19	7:00 pm	UNLV^{†}	No. 17	Bulldog Stadium; Fresno, CA		W 38–14	37,604
October 26	7:30 pm	at San Diego State	No. 15	Qualcomm Stadium; San Diego, CA (Battle for the Oil Can)	ESPN2	W 35–28 ^{OT}	32,707
November 2	7:30 pm	Nevada	No. 16	Bulldog Stadium; Fresno, CA	ESPNU	W 41–23	41,031
November 9	7:15 pm	at Wyoming	No. 17	War Memorial Stadium; Laramie, WY	ESPN2	W 48–10	15,700
November 23	4:00 pm	New Mexico	No. 15	Bulldog Stadium; Fresno, CA	ESPNews	W 69–28	41,031
November 29	12:30 pm	at San Jose State	No. 16	Spartan Stadium; San Jose, CA (Valley Cup)	CBSSN	L 52–62	23,574
December 7	8:00 pm	Utah State	No. 24	Bulldog Stadium; Fresno, CA (MW Championship Game)	CBS	W 24–17	31,362
December 21	12:30 pm	vs. USC*	No. 21	Sam Boyd Stadium; Whitney, NV (Las Vegas Bowl)	ABC	L 20–45	42,178
*Non-conference game; ^{†}Homecoming; Rankings from AP Poll released prior to the game; All times are in Pacific time

- ^ASeptember 15's game against Colorado was canceled due to effects from the Boulder Creek flash floods.

== Game summaries ==
=== Rutgers ===
	1	2	3	4	OT	Total
Scarlet Knights	10	10	11	14	6	51
Bulldogs	7	14	7	17	7	52

=== Cal Poly ===
	1	2	3	4	Total
No. 12 (FCS) Mustangs	0	0	10	15	25
Bulldogs	10	24	7	0	41

=== At Colorado ===
	1	2	3	4	Total
Bulldogs					0
Buffaloes					0

This game was canceled due to effects from the Boulder Creek flash floods.

=== Boise State ===
	1	2	3	4	Total
Broncos	10	9	7	14	40
No. 25 Bulldogs	10	14	10	7	41

=== At Hawaii ===
	1	2	3	4	Total
No. 23 Bulldogs	14	7	21	0	42
Warriors	0	3	14	20	37

=== At Idaho ===
	1	2	3	4	Total
No. 21 Bulldogs	28	19	7	7	61
Vandals	0	0	0	14	14

=== UNLV ===
	1	2	3	4	Total
Rebels	0	14	0	0	14
No. 19 Bulldogs	14	14	10	0	38

=== At San Diego State ===
	1	2	3	4	OT	Total
No. 15 Bulldogs	7	0	7	14	7	35
Aztecs	0	7	7	14	0	28

=== Nevada ===
	1	2	3	4	Total
Wolf Pack	7	0	9	7	23
No. 18 Bulldogs	14	10	0	17	41

=== At Wyoming ===
	1	2	3	4	Total
No. 17 Bulldogs	0	14	14	20	48
Cowboys	10	0	0	0	10

=== New Mexico ===
	1	2	3	4	Total
Lobos	0	0	21	7	28
No. 16 Bulldogs	14	21	28	6	69

=== At San Jose State ===
	1	2	3	4	Total
No. 13 Bulldogs	27	14	3	8	52
Spartans	21	21	10	10	62

=== Utah State ===
	1	2	3	4	Total
Aggies	0	7	0	10	17
No. 22 Bulldogs	3	14	7	0	24

=== USC–Las Vegas Bowl ===
	1	2	3	4	Total
Trojans	14	21	3	7	45
No. 20 Bulldogs	6	0	7	7	20

USC technically vacated the win in 2005. This is the second time the two teams have met in a bowl game with the other coming in the 1992 Freedom Bowl. Tracy Jones of the American Athletic Conference is the referee.

1st quarter scoring: USC - Marqise Lee 10-yard pass from Cody Kessler (Andre Heidari kick); FS - Isaiah Burse 8-yard pass from Derek Carr (Colin McGuire kick blocked); USC - Nelson Agholor 40-yard pass from Kessler (Heidari kick)

2nd quarter scoring: USC - Agholor 17-yard pass from Kessler (Heidari kick); USC - Javorius Allen 24-yard run (Heidari kick); USC - Lee 40-yard pass from Kessler (Heidari kick)

3rd quarter scoring: FS - Davante Adams 23-yard pass from Carr (McGuire kick); USC - Heidari 39-yard field goal

4th quarter scoring: FS - Derron Smith 41-yard interception return (McGuire kick); USC - Allen 1-yard run (Heidari kick)

== Statistics ==
- Derek Carr 424/605, 4866 Yds, 50 TD, 8 INT

== Rankings ==
Ranking movements Legend: ██ Increase in ranking ██ Decrease in ranking RV = Received votes
	Week																
Poll	Pre	1	2	3	4	5	6	7	8	9	10	11	12	13	14	15	Final
AP	RV	RV	RV	RV	25	23	21	17	15	16	17	16	15	16	24	21	RV
Coaches	RV	RV	RV	25	23	21	22	19	18	18	17	14	16	13	22	20	RV
Harris	Not released							18	18	18	17	13	14	13	22	20	Not released
BCS	Not released								17	16	16	14	15	16	23	20	Not released
