= Don Jackson (gridiron football) =

American gridiron football player (born 1993)

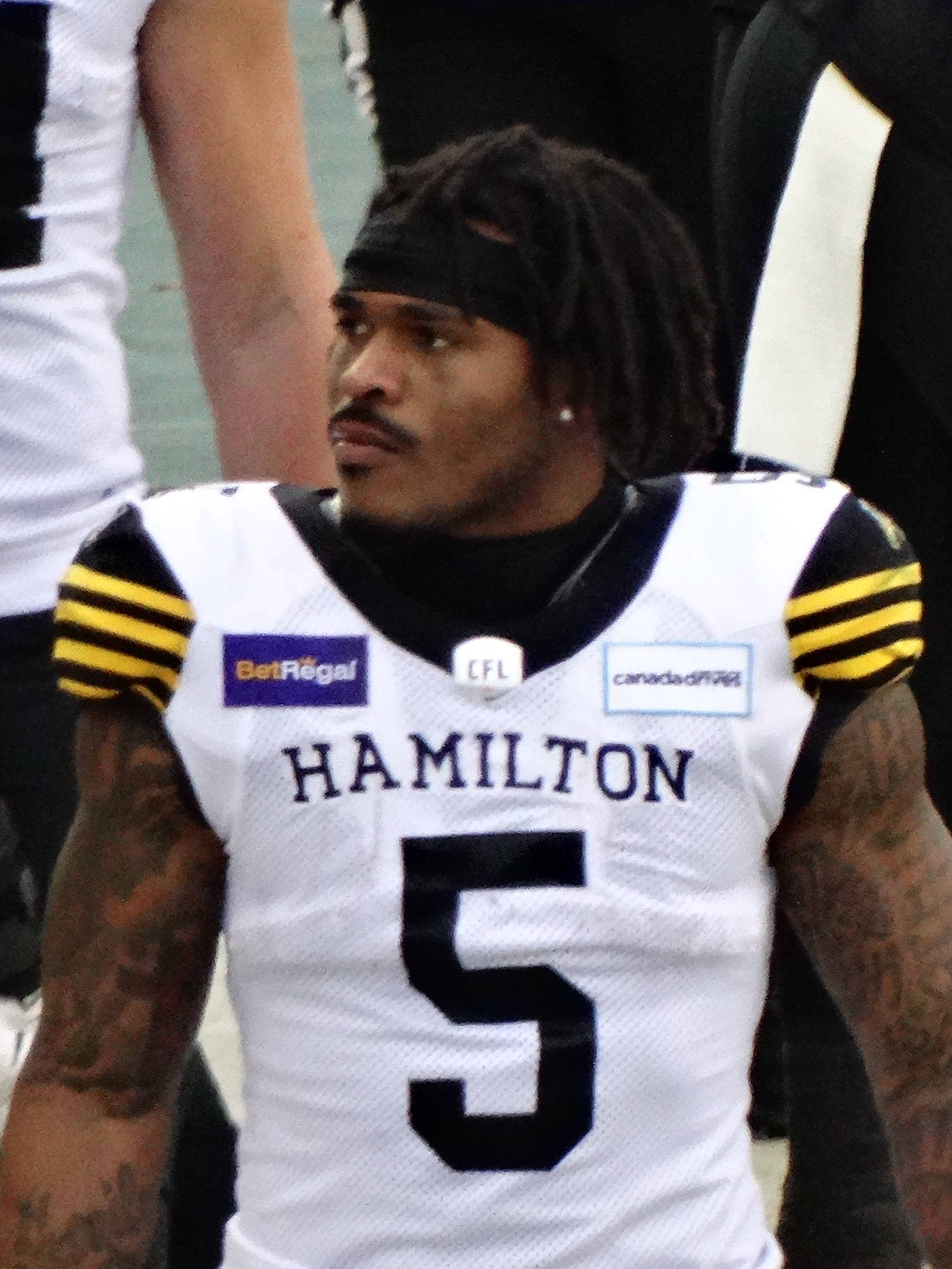
- Jackson with the Hamilton Tiger-Cats in 2021

No. 34, 25, 5
- Position: Running back

Personal information
- Born: September 7, 1993 (age 33); Sacramento, California, U.S.
- Listed height: 5 ft 10 in (1.78 m)
- Listed weight: 208 lb (94 kg)

Career information
- High school: Elk Grove (CA) Laguna Creek
- College: Nevada
- NFL draft: 2016: undrafted

Career history
- Green Bay Packers (2016); Calgary Stampeders (2018–2019); Hamilton Tiger-Cats (2020–2022)

Awards and highlights
- Grey Cup champion (2018)

Career NFL statistics
- Rushing attempts: 10
- Rushing yards: 32
- Stats at Pro Football Reference

Career CFL statistics
- Rushing attempts: 340
- Rushing yards: 1,714
- Rushing touchdowns: 7
- Receptions: 84
- Receiving yards: 621
- Stats at CFL.ca

Don Xzaviar Jackson (born September 7, 1993) is an American former professional football player who was a running back in the National Football League (NFL) and Canadian Football League (CFL). He played college football for the Nevada Wolf Pack. Jackson was signed by the NFL's Green Bay Packers as an undrafted free agent in 2016, and was also a member of the Calgary Stampeders and Hamilton Tiger-Cats of the CFL.

== College career ==
Jackson attended the University of Nevada, where he played on the Nevada Wolf Pack football team from 2013 to 2015 after playing one season and transferring from Iowa Western Community College.

=== College statistics ===
Year	Team	GP	Rushing					Receiving				
Year	Team	GP	Att	Yds	Avg	Lng	TD	Rec	Yds	Avg	Lng	TD
2013	Nevada	9	83	332	4.0	39	4	3	35	11.7	33	0
2014	Nevada	13	216	957	4.4	47	7	13	157	12.1	66	1
2015	Nevada	13	229	1,082	4.7	62	8	7	77	11.0	24	1
Total		35	528	2,371	4.5	62	19	23	269	11.7	66	2
Source: NevadaWolfPack.com

== Professional career ==
Pre-draft measurables
Height	Weight	40-yard dash	10-yard split	20-yard split	20-yard shuttle	Three-cone drill	Vertical jump	Broad jump	Bench press	Wonderlic
5 ft 10 in (1.78 m)	205 lb (93 kg)	4.50 s	1.59 s	2.62 s	4.34 s	7.09 s	38.5 in (0.98 m)	9 ft 10 in (3.00 m)	15 reps	12
All values are from Pro Day

=== Green Bay Packers ===
After going undrafted in the 2016 NFL draft, Jackson signed with the Green Bay Packers on May 6, 2016. On July 25, 2016, he was released by the Packers. Jackson was signed to the Packers' practice squad on September 5, 2016. On October 20, 2016, he was promoted from the practice squad to the active roster after Packers running backs Eddie Lacy and James Starks suffered injuries the week prior. Jackson made his NFL debut against their NFC North rival Chicago Bears in Week 7 on the same day he was promoted. He finished the game with two rushes for six yards after leaving the game early with a left hand injury in the first half. On November 16, 2016, he was placed on injured reserve.

Jackson re-signed with the Packers on March 8, 2017. On May 1, 2017, he was released by the Packers after the team drafted three running backs.

=== Calgary Stampeders ===
Jackson was a member of the Calgary Stampeders of the Canadian Football League (CFL) for two seasons starting in 2018. He played in 13 games for the Stampeders in his rookie season, rushing 160 times in his first season for over 900 yards and three scores. In his second season his playing time was limited by a concussion, and as a result he only played in seven games, carrying the ball 58 times for 246 yards.

=== Hamilton Tiger-Cats ===
Jackson signed a one-year deal with the Tiger-Cats on February 11, 2020. Following the cancelled 2020 season he signed a contract extension with the Hamilton Tiger-Cats on December 27, 2020. In two seasons in Hamilton Jackson played in 14 regular season games, carrying the ball 122 times for 544 yards with two rushing touchdowns. He also caught 40 passes for 321 yards and two receiving touchdowns. Injuries and the Canadian-American player ration limited his playing time in Hamilton. Jackson was released by the Ti-Cats on February 2, 2023, citing his desire to spend more time with his family.

=== NFL statistics ===
Year	Team	G	GS	Rushing					Receiving					Fumbles	
Year	Team	G	GS	Att	Yds	Avg	Lng	TD	Rec	Yds	Avg	Lng	TD	FUM	Lost
2016	GB	3	1	10	32	3.2	7	0	0	0	0.0	0	0	0	0
Total		3	1	10	32	3.2	7	0	0	0	0.0	0	0	0	0
Source: NFL.com
