= 2015 Arizona Bowl =

Inaugural edition of the Arizona Bowl

2015 Nova Home Loans Arizona Bowl
Nevada Wolf Pack	Colorado State Rams
(6–6)	(7–5)
Mountain West	Mountain West
28	23
Head coach: Brian Polian	Head coach: Mike Bobo
	1	2	3	4	Total
Nevada	3	16	3	6	28
Colorado State	0	13	7	3	23
- Date: December 29, 2015
- Season: 2015
- Stadium: Arizona Stadium
- Location: Tucson, Arizona
- MVP: Offense: James Butler (RB-NEV); Defense: Ian Seau (DE-NEV)
- Favorite: Colorado State by 3 1/2
- Referee: Tracy Jones (AAC)
- Halftime show: Los Lobos Band
- Attendance: 20,425

United States TV coverage
- Network: ASN/Campus Insiders
- Announcers: Ron Thulin, Doug Chapman, Monica McNutt (sideline) and Shae Peppler (sideline)

The 2015 Arizona Bowl (known as the 2015 NOVA Home Loans Arizona Bowl for sponsorship reasons) was a post-season college football bowl game between the Nevada Wolf Pack and the Colorado State Rams played on December 29, 2015, at Arizona Stadium in Tucson, Arizona. It was the inaugural edition of the Arizona Bowl and the final game of the 2015 NCAA Division I FBS football season for both teams. In an unusual circumstance for a postseason bowl game, both teams were from the Mountain West Conference due to issues fulfilling the bowl's conference tie-ins, resulting in the first bowl game to feature conference opponents since the 1979 Orange Bowl.

== Team selection ==
The Arizona Bowl, new for 2015, had tie-ins with Conference USA (C-USA) and the Mountain West Conference. If one of those conferences did not have enough bowl-eligible teams, the Sun Belt Conference was an alternative. At the end of the regular season, Mountain West had seven bowl-eligible teams and six guaranteed spots, leaving the placement of individual teams uncertain. When neither C-USA or Sun Belt were able to provide a team to the Arizona Bowl, a matchup between two Mountain West teams was the result, marking the first time since the 1979 Orange Bowl that a non-championship bowl game was played between members of the same conference.

The outcome drew the ire of Mountain West commissioner Craig Thompson, who criticized how the NCAA selected teams with losing records to gain bowl eligibility "on an equal footing with 6–6 teams", explaining that "our Conference representatives argued steadfastly for an approach whereby all 6–6 teams would first be placed according to primary and secondary agreements among the conferences and bowl games. Our position was that only then would the safety net of 5–7 teams be activated for those games which had not yet secured participants, rather than allow those teams to fulfill conference agreements and usurp 6–6 teams from conferences with backup agreements."

The two Mountain West teams selected for the Arizona Bowl had not met in the regular season, as they were in opposite divisions, and were not in the rotation to play each other during the season.

=== Nevada Wolf Pack ===
The Nevada Wolf Pack finished the regular season 6–6 (4–4 in conference) under third-year head coach Brian Polian, becoming bowl-eligible after defeating San Jose State. This game was Nevada's tenth bowl appearance in eleven seasons.

=== Colorado State Rams ===
The Colorado State Rams finished the regular season 7–5 (5–3 in conference) under first-year head coach Mike Bobo, becoming bowl-eligible for the third straight year after defeating New Mexico.

== Game summary ==
Colorado State won the toss and elected to receive. The Rams drove downfield into Nevada territory before quarterback Nick Stevens fumbled and the Wolfpack pounced on it at the Rams 41-yard line. From there, Nevada drove to the Rams 2-yard line where they were forced to settle for a 19-yard Brent Zuzo field goal to take the lead, 3–0. The Wolfpack forced a punt and kicked another field goal—this one a 37-yarder—to go up, 6–0. The Rams got a drive going on their next possession, advancing to the Nevada 4-yard line where they were stopped on fourth down. However, Nevada went three-and-out and CSU got the ball back with very good field position at the 39-yard line. After a long pass down to the 1-yard line, Stevens scored on a QB keeper to give CSU the lead, 7–6. It didn't last long though, as Nevada running back James Butler burst through a hole in the defense for a 77-yard rushing touchdown that put the Pack back up, 13–7. On their next drive, CSU drove down the field and made a short 20-yard field goal to trim the lead to 13–10 for Nevada. On the ensuing kickoff, Elijah Mitchell returned it 96 yards for a touchdown to extend the lead to 19–10. The extra point, however, was no good. CSU kicked a field goal right before halftime to make it 19–13 Nevada at the break. Nevada scored early in the third quarter on a field goal to make it 22–13. CSU was not out of it yet, as they went on a 12-play 75-yard drive that culminated in a 9-yard touchdown by Jamsen Odon. At the end of three quarters, Nevada led, 22–20. Nevada's next drive resulted in a turnover on downs, and both teams traded punts before CSU nailed a 38-yard field goal to take a 23–22 lead. Nevada then put together a very dramatic late-game drive that ended up with Butler scoring on a 4-yard touchdown run. The two-point conversion was no good and Nevada was up, 28–23. CSU put together a last-ditch drive that time ran out on, at the Nevada 12-yard line. The final score remained at 28–23, for a Nevada win.

Scoring summary :

Scoring summary

Quarter	Time	Drive			Team	Scoring information	Score	
Quarter	Time	Plays	Yards	TOP	Team	Scoring information	NEV	CSU
1	7:21	10	39	5:19	NEV	19-yard field goal by Brent Zuzo	3	0
2	14:13	8	53	4:53	NEV	37-yard field goal by Brent Zuzo	6	0
2	7:04	2	39	0:39	CSU	Nick Stevens 1-yard touchdown run, Wyatt Bryan kick good	6	7
2	6:38	2	82	0:20	NEV	James Butler 77-yard touchdown run, Brent Zuzo kick good	13	7
2	1:46	11	81	4:44	CSU	20-yard field goal by Wyatt Bryan	13	10
2	1:33	–	–	–	NEV	Kickoff returned 96 yards for touchdown by Elijah Mitchell, Brent Zuzo kick no good	19	10
2	0:08	13	58	1:17	CSU	29-yard field goal by Wyatt Bryan	19	13
3	9:16	12	53	5:39	NEV	40-yard field goal by Brent Zuzo	22	13
3	3:55	12	75	5:21	CSU	Jamsen Odon 9-yard touchdown run, Wyatt Bryan kick good	22	20
4	3:40	8	42	3:25	CSU	38-yard field goal by Wyatt Bryan	22	23
4	1:06	8	72	2:28	NEV	James Butler 4-yard touchdown run, 2-point run by James Butler failed	28	23
"TOP" = time of possession. For other American football terms, see Glossary of American football.							28	23

=== Statistics ===
Statistics	NEV	CSU
First downs	18	30
Total offense, plays–yards	53–345	84–532
Rushes–yards (net)	40–271	42–222
Passing yards (net)	74	310
Passes, Comp–Att–Int	6–13–0	22–42–1
Time of Possession	27:30	32:30
