= 2013 Las Vegas Bowl =

2013 Royal Purple Las Vegas Bowl
- 22nd Las Vegas Bowl
Fresno State Bulldogs	USC Trojans
(11–1)	(9–4)
Mountain West	Pac-12
20	45
Head coach: Tim DeRuyter	Head coach: Clay Helton (interim)
AP / Coaches / BCS; 21 / 20 / 20	AP / Coaches / BCS; NR / NR / 25
	1	2	3	4	Total
Fresno State	6	0	7	7	20
USC	14	21	3	7	45
- Date: December 21, 2013
- Season: 2013
- Stadium: Sam Boyd Stadium
- Location: Whitney, Nevada
- Favorite: USC by 6
- Referee: Tracy Jones (American)
- Attendance: 42,178
- Payout: US$1 million per team

United States TV coverage
- Network: ABC/Sports USA Radio
- Announcers: Rece Davis (Play-by-Play); Jesse Palmer (Analyst); David Pollack (Analyst); Samantha Ponder (Sideline)

The 2013 Las Vegas Bowl was an American college football bowl game that was played on December 21, 2013, at Sam Boyd Stadium in Whitney, Nevada, in the Las Vegas Valley. The 22nd annual Las Vegas Bowl, it featured the Mountain West Conference champion Fresno State Bulldogs against the USC Trojans of the Pac-12 Conference. The game started at 12:30 p.m. PST and aired on ABC and Sports USA Radio. It was one of the 2013–14 bowl games that concluded the 2013 FBS football season. Sponsored by motor oil manufacturer Royal Purple, the game was officially known as the Royal Purple Las Vegas Bowl. The Trojans won by a score of 45–20.

== Teams ==
=== Fresno State Bulldogs ===
Continuing their conference success from the previous season which saw them finish 7–1 and sharing their conference title with Boise State, the Bulldogs did even better in the 2013 season. Already having won the Mountain West Conference's West Division championship, the Bulldogs went on to win the first Mountain West Conference Championship Game, defeating Utah State by a score of 24–17, advancing to the Las Vegas Bowl by virtue of their victory.

This will be the Bulldogs' second Las Vegas Bowl; they had previously made the bowl in 1999, losing to the Utah Utes by a last-second field goal for a score of 17–16.

=== USC Trojans ===
The season was tumultuous by USC standards, having seen head coach Lane Kiffin fired five games into the season, and then interim head coach Ed Orgeron resigning at season's end (Clay Helton will serve as interim coach for the bowl game while Steve Sarkisian takes over for the 2014 season). Nonetheless, the Trojans still managed a 6–3 conference and 9–4 overall record (tied with the rival UCLA Bruins for second in the Pac-12 South Division), leading them to the Las Vegas Bowl at season's end.

This will be USC's second Las Vegas Bowl; they had previously made the bowl in 2001, losing to future conference foe the Utah Utes by a score of 10–6.

== Game summary ==
=== Scoring summary ===
Scoring summary

Quarter	Time	Drive			Team	Scoring information	Score	
Quarter	Time	Plays	Yards	TOP	Team	Scoring information	Fresno State	USC
1	8:54	12	65	6:06	USC	Marqise Lee 10-yard touchdown reception from Cody Kessler, Andre Heidari kick good	0	7
1	8:33	3	33	0:21	FRES	Isaiah Burse 8-yard touchdown reception from Derek Carr, Colin McGuire kick no good (blocked)	6	7
1	6:22	5	65	2:11	USC	Nelson Agholor 40-yard touchdown reception from Kessler, Heidari kick good	6	14
2	9:05	9	65	5:19	USC	Agholor 17-yard touchdown reception from Kessler, Heidari kick good	6	21
2	7:27	2	30	0:47	USC	Javorius Allen 24-yard touchdown run, Heidari kick good	6	28
2	0:37	6	88	3:41	USC	Lee 40-yard touchdown reception from Kessler, Heidari kick good	6	35
3	11:42	6	37	1:54	FRES	Davante Adams 23-yard touchdown reception from Carr, McGuire kick good	13	35
3	6:44	10	48	4:58	USC	39-yard field goal by Heidari	13	38
4	14:40	3	1	0:28	FRES	Interception returned 41 yards for touchdown by Derron Smith, McGuire kick good	20	38
4	4:44	12	80	7:14	USC	Allen 1-yard touchdown run, Heidari kick good	20	45
"TOP" = time of possession. For other American football terms, see Glossary of American football.							20	45

=== Statistics ===
Statistics	FRE	USC
First downs	14	23
Total offense, plays – yards	61–254	75–487
Rushes-yards (net)	6–37	45–143
Passing yards (net)	217	344
Passes, Comp-Att-Int	30–55–1	22–30–1
Time of Possession	18:33	38:47

== Notes ==
- Each school was allotted 11,000 tickets
- Cody Kessler was named the MVP in the game
