= Brian Polian =

American football player and coach (born 1974)

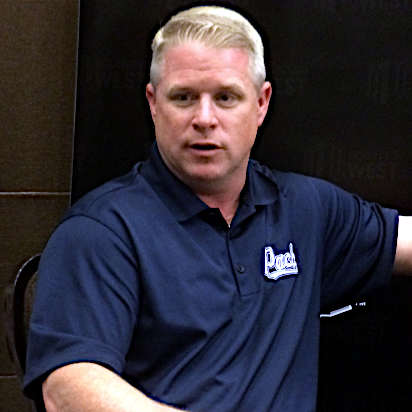
- Polian at 2016 Mountain West Media Day

Current position
- Title: Athletic director & head coach
- Team: John Carroll
- Conference: NCAC
- Record: 8–2

Biographical details
- Born: December 22, 1974 (age 51); Bronx, New York, U.S.
- Education: John Carroll University

Playing career
- 1993–1996: John Carroll
- Position: Linebacker

Coaching career (HC unless noted)
- 1997: Michigan State (GA)
- 1998: Buffalo (TE/AOL)
- 1999–2000: Baylor (GA)
- 2001–2003: Buffalo (RB/ST)
- 2004: UCF (RB/RC)
- 2005: Notre Dame (ST/ADB)
- 2006: Notre Dame (ST/LBA)
- 2007: Notre Dame (ST/ILB)
- 2008–2009: Notre Dame (ST)
- 2010: Stanford (ST/S)
- 2011: Stanford (ST/S/RC)
- 2012: Texas A&M (ST/TE)
- 2013–2016: Nevada
- 2017–2020: Notre Dame (ST/RC)
- 2021: Notre Dame (ST/AHC)
- 2022: LSU (ST/RC)
- 2026–present: John Carroll

Administrative career (AD unless noted)
- 2023–present: John Carroll

Head coaching record
- Overall: 31–29
- Bowls: 1–1

Brian Stewart Polian (born December 22, 1974) is an American college football coach and former player. He is the head football coach and athletic director for John Carroll University, holding the position of head football coach since 2026 and athletic director since 2023. He is the former head coach of the Nevada Wolf Pack football team. He is the son of former National Football League (NFL) executive Bill Polian.

== Early life ==
Born in The Bronx, Polian graduated from Saint Francis High School in Athol Springs, New York, near Buffalo, in 1993. He attended John Carroll University located in the eastern suburbs of Cleveland, where he played on the football team as a linebacker from 1993 to 1996. He graduated with a bachelor's degree in history in 1997.

== Coaching career ==
=== Early coaching career ===
Polian began his coaching career in 1997 as a graduate assistant at Michigan State. In 1998, he was the tight ends and offensive line assistant at the University at Buffalo. In 1999 and 2000, Polian was a defensive graduate assistant at Baylor under Kevin Steele. Polian graduated from Baylor with a master's degree in 2000.

Polian returned to Buffalo in 2001 as running backs coach and special teams coordinator, serving until 2003 all under coach Jim Hofher. In 2004, he was assistant coach at the same positions at UCF under George O'Leary. From 2005 to 2009, Polian was special teams coordinator at Notre Dame under Charlie Weis. He also served as defensive backs coach in 2005, linebackers coach in 2006, and inside linebackers coach in 2007. Notre Dame made three bowl appearances during Polian's tenure, including a win in the 2008 Hawaii Bowl.

He then was special teams coordinator and safeties coach at Stanford from 2010 to 2011 and was also recruiting coordinator in 2011. Part of Jim Harbaugh's staff in 2010, Polian remained at Stanford under succeeding coach David Shaw. Stanford won the 2011 Orange Bowl after the 2010 season. In 2012, Polian was special teams coordinator and tight ends coach under Kevin Sumlin at Texas A&M, which won the 2013 Cotton Bowl Classic that season.

=== Nevada ===
On January 11, 2013, the University of Nevada, Reno hired Polian as football head coach. On November 27, 2016, Nevada parted ways with Polian, in effect terminating him. He was also fined for excessively arguing with referees.

=== Notre Dame ===
On December 16, 2016, Polian was hired to return to Notre Dame once again as special teams coordinator, this time under Brian Kelly.

=== LSU ===
On December 7, 2021, Polian was hired by LSU as the special teams coordinator, under Brian Kelly. After the 2022 season, Polian transitioned to an off-the-field position assisting in managing the Tigers' roster. The change came after LSU's special teams performed poorly in a number of pivotal games.

== Administrative career ==
On May 2, 2023, Polian was announced as the new athletic director for John Carroll University.

== Head coaching record ==
| Year | Team | Overall | Conference | Standing | Bowl/playoffs |
|---|---|---|---|---|---|
Nevada Wolf Pack (Mountain West Conference) (2013–2016)
| 2013 | Nevada | 4–8 | 3–5 | 5th (West) | |
| 2014 | Nevada | 7–6 | 4–4 | 3rd (West) | L New Orleans |
| 2015 | Nevada | 7–6 | 4–4 | T–2nd (West) | W Arizona |
| 2016 | Nevada | 5–7 | 3–5 | T–3rd (West) | |
| Nevada: | | 23–27 | 14–18 | | |
John Carroll Blue Streaks (North Coast Athletic Conference) (2026–present)
| 2026 | John Carroll | 8–2 | 7–2 | | Win Extra Point Bowl |
| John Carroll: | | 8–2 | 7–2 | | |
| Total: | | 31–29 | | | |
