= Ian Seau =

American football player (born 1992)

Profile
- Position: Defensive end

Personal information
- Born: December 4, 1992 (age 33); Oceanside, California U.S.
- Listed height: 6 ft 2 in (1.88 m)
- Listed weight: 250 lb (113 kg)

Career information
- High school: Carlsbad (CA) La Costa Canyon
- College: Nevada
- NFL draft: 2016: undrafted

Career history
- Los Angeles Rams (2016)*; Saskatchewan Roughriders (2016)*; Buffalo Bills (2017)*; Arizona Hotshots (2019)*
- * Offseason or practice squad member only

Awards and highlights
- First-team All-MWC (2015); Second-team All-MWC (2014)
- Stats at Pro Football Reference

Ian Seau (/ˈseɪ.aʊ/; SAY-ow; born December 4, 1992) is an American former professional football player who was a defensive end. He played college football for the Nevada Wolf Pack.

== Early life ==
Seau was born to Mary Seau in Oceanside, California. He attended La Costa Canyon High School in Carlsbad, California, where he had 89 tackles, 18 sacks and 4 blocked kicks as a four-year starter.

== College career ==
Seau had four starts as a sophomore after transferring from Grossmont College in San Diego. He set a career-high with four tackles, including 2.5 for loss, in the first win of the season against UC Davis. Seau credited with 23 tackles overall with five behind the line of scrimmage, and also forced a fumble and broke up a pass against San Diego State. As a junior, he was an All-Mountain West second-team selection. To do so he credited with 39 tackles, 10.5 tackles for loss, 8.5 sacks, four pass breakups, two forced fumbles, one interception and one quarterback hurry on the season. Seau led the team and ranked second in the Mountain West in sacks with 8.5. His 8.5 sacks ranks tied for 10th in a single season in program history. Seau finished the season tied for 13th in the Mountain West in tackles for loss. Credited with three turnovers on the season, helping Nevada rank second in the conference in turnover margin. Posted a season-best six tackles against Arizona and Air Force. Registered a season-high two sacks against Air Force and San Diego State. Intercepted a pass and returned it 32 yards for a touchdown in homecoming game against Boise State. Forced a fumble against BYU and San Diego State. Named to the All-Mountain West first-team, becoming the first player in program history to be named to the All-MW first or second-team in consecutive seasons. Seau started in all 12 games at defensive end with 38 tackles, 15.5 tackles for loss, 9.0 sacks, four forced fumbles, three passes defended and one fumble recovery. He was ranked tied for first in the MW and tied for 19th in the nation with 9.0 sacks, which is tied for the eighth-most sacks in a single season in program history. Led the Mountain West and ranked 12th in FBS with four forced fumbles. Ranked third in the MW and tied for 30th in the nation with 15.5 tackles for loss.

== Professional career ==
Pre-draft measurables
| Height | Weight | Arm length | Hand span | 40-yard dash | 10-yard split | 20-yard split | 20-yard shuttle | Three-cone drill | Vertical jump | Broad jump | Bench press |
|---|---|---|---|---|---|---|---|---|---|---|---|
| 6 ft 2 1/8 in (1.88 m) | 250 lb (113 kg) | 31 1/4 in (0.79 m) | 10 in (0.25 m) | 4.68 s | 1.64 s | 2.75 s | 4.51 s | 7.63 s | 34.5 in (0.88 m) | 9 ft 9 in (2.97 m) | 22 reps |
All values from Nevada Wolf Pack Pro Day

=== Los Angeles Rams ===
After going undrafted in the 2016 NFL draft, Seau was signed by the Los Angeles Rams on May 5, 2016. He was waived by the Rams on September 3, 2016.

=== Saskatchewan Roughriders ===
Seau was signed to the practice roster of the Saskatchewan Roughriders of the Canadian Football League on October 3, 2016, but was released the next day.

=== Buffalo Bills ===
On April 10, 2017, Seau was signed by the Buffalo Bills. He was waived on September 2, 2017, and was signed to the Bills' practice squad the next day. He was released on September 5, 2017.

=== Arizona Hotshots ===
On January 12, 2019, Seau was signed by the Arizona Hotshots, but was waived eight days later.

== Personal life ==
Seau is the nephew of Hall of Fame linebacker Junior Seau.
