= Lester Erb =

American football player and coach (born 1969)

Biographical details
- Born: April 22, 1969 (age 57); Milton, Pennsylvania

Playing career
- 1988–1990: Bucknell

Coaching career (HC unless noted)
- 1991–1993: Hobart (Wide Receivers)
- 1994–1996: Syracuse (Assistant)
- 1997–1998: Baltimore Ravens (Assistant)
- 1999: Army (TE)
- 2000–2007: Iowa (WR/ST)
- 2008–2012: Iowa (RB/ST)
- 2013–2016: Nevada (RB/ST)
- 2017: Rutgers (RB)
- 2018–2019: Rutgers (WR)

Lester L. Erb (born April 22, 1969) is an American Football coach and former player. He formerly was the running back coach and wide receivers coach at Rutgers University.

== Coaching career ==
=== Baltimore Ravens ===
Lester Erb was an offensive quality control coach for the Baltimore Ravens for two seasons.

=== Iowa Hawkeyes ===
After a year coaching tight ends at Army, Erb joined the former Ravens offensive line and assistant head coach Kirk Ferentz one year after Ferentz became the Iowa head coach, and coached running backs and wide receivers there. Erb was named one of the top recruiters in the nation while coaching at Iowa.

=== Nevada ===
Erb spent a four years coaching special teams and running backs at Nevada.

=== Rutgers ===
On January 6, 2017, it was announced that Erb would be leaving to take over as the running back coach for Rutgers. In 2018 it was decided that Erb would switch from coaching running backs to wide receivers. When Greg Schiano retook control of the program in 2020 it was announced that Erb would no longer be coaching for the Rutgers Scarlet Knights.
