= Lenny Jones =

American gridiron football player (born 1991)

No. 94
- Position: Defensive end

Personal information
- Born: August 8, 1991 (age 35); San Leandro, California, U.S.
- Listed height: 6 ft 2 in (1.88 m)
- Listed weight: 256 lb (116 kg)

Career information
- High school: San Leandro (San Leandro, California)
- College: Nevada (2011–2015)
- NFL draft: 2016: undrafted

Career history
- San Francisco 49ers (2016)*; Oakland Raiders (2016)*; Los Angeles Rams (2016)*; Dallas Cowboys (2016–2017)*; Cleveland Browns (2018); Calgary Stampeders (2020–2021)*
- * Offseason or practice squad member only

Awards and highlights
- Second-team All-Mountain West (2015)
- Stats at Pro Football Reference

Lenny Jones (born August 8, 1991) is an American former football defensive end. He played college football at Nevada and was signed by the San Francisco 49ers as an undrafted free agent in 2016.

== Professional career ==
=== San Francisco 49ers and Oakland Raiders ===
On May 6, 2016, Jones was signed by the San Francisco 49ers as an undrafted free agent. He was waived by the 49ers on August 4, 2016, was claimed off waivers by the Oakland Raiders the next day. On August 29, 2016, he was released by the Raiders.

=== Los Angeles Rams ===
On November 18, 2016, Jones was signed to the Los Angeles Rams' practice squad.

=== Dallas Cowboys ===
On January 10, 2017, Jones was signed to the Cowboys' practice squad. He signed a reserve/future contract with the Cowboys on January 16, 2017. He was waived on September 2, 2017.

=== Cleveland Browns ===
On May 6, 2018, Jones signed with the Cleveland Browns. He was waived/injured on August 31, 2018, and was placed on injured reserve. Jones was waived with an injury settlement by the Browns on May 2, 2019.

=== Calgary Stampeders ===
Jones signed with the Calgary Stampeders on February 6, 2020. He was released on June 16, 2021.
