= Brock Hekking =

American football player (born 1991)

No. 59
- Position: Linebacker

Personal information
- Born: October 6, 1991 (age 35); San Francisco, California, U.S.
- Listed height: 6 ft 3 in (1.91 m)
- Listed weight: 250 lb (113 kg)

Career information
- College: Nevada
- NFL draft: 2015: undrafted

Career history
- San Diego Chargers (2015–2016)

Awards and highlights
- 2× Second-team All-Mountain West (2012,2014)
- Stats at Pro Football Reference

Broderick 'Brock' Adrianus Hekking (born October 6, 1991) is an American former football linebacker. He played college football at Nevada.

== College career ==
Hekking played college football at Nevada, where was named first team All-Mountain West and Second-team All-Mountain West twice.

== Professional career ==
Hekking was signed by the Chargers as an undrafted free agent in 2015. He was placed on injured reserve on September 1, 2015. He was placed on injured reserve again on May 17, 2016, missing two straight seasons.

On March 14, 2017, Hekking was waived by the Chargers with a failed physical designation.
