= 2013 Wyoming Cowboys football team =

American college football season

2013 Wyoming Cowboys football
- Conference: Mountain West Conference
- Mountain Division
- Record: 5–7 (3–5 MW)
- Head coach: Dave Christensen (5th season)
- Offensive coordinator: Pete Kaligis (1st season)
- Co-offensive coordinator: Jim Harding (1st season)
- Offensive scheme: Spread
- Defensive coordinator: Chris Tormey (2nd season; first 8 games); Jamar Cain (interim; final 4 games) (1st season)
- Base defense: 4–3
- Home stadium: War Memorial Stadium

2013 Mountain West Conference football standings
	Conf.			Overall
Team	W		L	W		L
Mountain Division
Utah State x	7	–	1	9	–	5
Boise State	6	–	2	8	–	5
Colorado State	5	–	3	8	–	6
Wyoming	3	–	5	5	–	7
New Mexico	1	–	7	3	–	9
Air Force	0	–	8	2	–	10
West Division
Fresno State x$	7	–	1	11	–	2
San Diego State	6	–	2	8	–	5
UNLV	5	–	3	7	–	6
San Jose State	5	–	3	6	–	6
Nevada	3	–	5	4	–	8
Hawaii	0	–	8	1	–	11
Championship: Fresno State 24, Utah State 17
$ – Conference champion; x – Division champion/co-champions; Rankings from AP Poll

The 2013 Wyoming Cowboys football team represented the University of Wyoming as a member Mountain West Conference (MW) during the 2013 NCAA Division I FBS football season. Led Dave Christensen in his fifth and final season as head coach, the Cowboys compiled an overall record of 5–7 record with mark 3–5 in conference play, placing fourth in the MW's Mountain Division. The team played home games at War Memorial Stadium in Laramie, Wyoming.

Chris Tormey, the Cowboys' defensive coordinator was fired mid-season after two straight losses in which the Cowboys surrendered more than 50. Christensen promoted defensive line coach Jamar Cain to interim defensive coordinator. On December 1, the Wyoming announced that Christensen had been fired.

== Schedule ==
Date	Time	Opponent	Site	TV	Result	Attendance	Source
August 31	6:00 p.m.	at No. 18 Nebraska*	Memorial Stadium; Lincoln, NE	BTN	L 34–37	91,185	
September 7	2:00 p.m.	Idaho*	War Memorial Stadium; Laramie, WY	RSRM	W 42–10	22,030	
September 14	2:00 p.m.	Northern Colorado*	War Memorial Stadium; Laramie, WY		W 35–7	19,091	
September 21	8:15 p.m.	at Air Force	Falcon Stadium; Colorado Springs, CO	ESPNU	W 56–23	35,389	
September 28	5:00 p.m.	at Texas State*	Bobcat Stadium; San Marcos, TX	LHN	L 21–42	22,150	
October 12	1:30 p.m.	New Mexico	War Memorial Stadium; Laramie, WY	RSRM	W 38–31	22,853	
October 19	12:00 p.m.	Colorado State	War Memorial Stadium; Laramie, WY (Border War)	RSRM	L 22–52	24,953	
October 26	5:00 p.m.	at San Jose State	Spartan Stadium; San Jose, CA	RSRM	L 44–51	16,123	
November 9	8:15 p.m.	No. 17 Fresno State	War Memorial Stadium; Laramie, WY	ESPN2	L 10–48	15,700	
November 16	8:15 p.m.	at Boise State	Bronco Stadium; Boise, ID	ESPN2	L 7–48	33,992	
November 23	12:00 p.m.	Hawaii	War Memorial Stadium; Laramie, WY (rivalry)		W 59–56 ^{OT}	12,227	
November 30	12:00 p.m.	at Utah State	Romney Stadium; Logan, UT (rivalry)	RSRM	L 7–35	21,325	
*Non-conference game; Rankings from AP Poll released prior to the game; All times are in Mountain time

== Game summaries ==
=== @ Nebraska ===
	1	2	3	4	Total
Cowboys	7	7	7	13	34
#18 Cornhuskers	10	7	14	6	37

=== Idaho ===
	1	2	3	4	Total
Vandals	0	0	0	10	10
Cowboys	0	21	21	0	42

=== Northern Colorado ===
	1	2	3	4	Total
Bears	0	0	0	7	7
Cowboys	0	21	0	14	35

=== @ Air Force ===
	1	2	3	4	Total
Cowboys	14	28	7	7	56
Falcons	10	7	0	6	23

=== @ Texas State ===
	1	2	3	4	Total
Cowboys	0	14	0	7	21
Bobcats	7	7	14	14	42

=== New Mexico ===
	1	2	3	4	Total
Lobos	0	3	14	14	31
Cowboys	14	7	3	14	38

=== Colorado State ===
	1	2	3	4	Total
Rams	14	10	14	14	52
Cowboys	0	7	8	7	22

=== @ San Jose State ===
	1	2	3	4	Total
Cowboys	16	7	7	14	44
Spartans	0	14	22	15	51

=== Fresno State ===
	1	2	3	4	Total
#17 Bulldogs	0	14	14	20	48
Cowboys	10	0	0	0	10

=== @ Boise State ===
	1	2	3	4	Total
Cowboys	7	0	0	0	7
Broncos	14	14	17	3	48

=== Hawaii ===
	1	2	3	4	OT	Total
Warriors	14	21	7	14	0	56
Cowboys	13	22	7	14	3	59

=== @ Utah State ===
	1	2	3	4	Total
Cowboys	0	0	0	7	7
Aggies	7	14	14	0	35

== Personnel ==
=== Coaching staff ===
Name	Position	Seasons at Wyoming	Alma mater	Before Wyoming
Dave Christensen	Head coach	5	Western Washington (1985)	Missouri – Assistant head coach / offensive coordinator (2008)
Pete Kaligis	Asst. head coach / Co-Off. Coordinator / running backs coach	5	Washington (1994)	Montana – Offensive line coach (2008)
Jim Harding	Co-offensive Coordinator / offensive line coach	5	Toledo (2001)	Troy HS – Head coach (2008)
Chris Tormey	Defensive coordinator / safeties coach	2	Idaho (1978)	Washington State – Linebackers coach (2011)
Robin Ross	Special teams coordinator / Linebackers	2	Washington State (1977)	UNLV – Linebackers coach (2011)
Jamar Cain	Defensive line coach	1	New Mexico State (2002)	Cal Poly – Defensive line coach (2012)
Nick Danielson	Tight Ends / h-backs coach	2	Occidental College (2011)	University of Puget Sound – Assistant Offensive Line Coach (2012)
Jason Gesser	Quarterbacks	1	Washington State (2002)	Idaho – Interim head coach / offensive coordinator / quarterbacks coach (2012)
Renaldo Hill	Cornerbacks	2	Michigan State (2012)	Denver Broncos – Cornerback (2010)
Derek Sage	Wide receivers	4	Cal State Northridge (2002)	New Hampshire – Wide receivers coach (2009)

=== Roster ===
2013 Wyoming Cowboys Football
Quarterbacks: 11 Colby Kirkegaard – senior (6'3", 198); 13 Tommy Thornton – freshman (6'1", 205); 16 Brett Smith – junior (6'3", 205); 17 Jason Thompson – sophomore (6'2", 212); Tailbacks: 7 D.J. May – sophomore (5'11", 196); 8 Brandon Miller – senior (6'0", 188); 22 Tedder Easton – senior (5'11", 260); 24 Omar Stover – freshman (5'11", 192); 26 Shaun Wick – sophomore (5'10", 190); 32 Joshua Tapscott – freshman (5'9", 200); Wide receivers: 1 Jalen Claiborne – junior (5'9", 175); 2 Eric Nzeocha – freshman (6'1", 208); 3 Trey Norman – junior (6'1", 170); 4 Tanner Gentry – freshman (6'2", 190); 5 Trent Sewell – freshman (6'2", 207); 6 Robert Herron – senior (5'10", 187); 9 Sam Stratton – junior (5'11", 196); 18 Josh Smith – junior (6'3", 205); 19 Keenan Montgomery – junior (6'1", 180); 25 Spencer Bruce – senior (6'5", 225); 27 Oscar Nevermann – freshman (6'1", 210); 33 Dominic Rufran – junior (6'0", 185); 81 Justin Berger – junior (6'2", 200); 82 Tanner Simpson – freshman (6'2", 178); 83 Jake Maulhardt – freshman (6'6", 197); 89 Nico Brown – freshman (6'3", 205); Tight ends: 42 Riley Lange – junior (6'3", 250); 80 J.D. Krill – junior (6'6", 255); 86 Luke Leddige – junior (6'2", 205)	Offensive linemen: 50 Albert Perez – junior (6'1", 285); 51 Tyler Strong – senior (6'3", 312); 58 Taylor Knestis – freshman (6'5", 270); 62 Josh Teeter – freshman (6'3", 268); 63 Rafe Kiely – sophomore (6'3", 296); 64 Charlie Renfree – freshman (6'3", 283); 65 Jesse Wilson – sophomore (6'1", 230); 66 Zach D'Amico – sophomore (5'11", 275); 69 Austin Tixier – freshman (6'3", 272); 71 Austin Traphagan – sophomore (6'5", 308); 72 Jake Jones – sophomore (6'3", 295); 73 Chase Roullier – freshman (6'4", 312); 74 Walker Madden – junior (6'9", 280); 75 Kurtis Stirneman – freshman (6'5", 270); 76 Jacob English – freshman (6'5", 305); 77 Connor Rains – junior (6'7", 318); 78 Nathan Leddige – freshman (6'5", 289); 79 Connor Riese – freshman (6'7", 305); Defensive linemen: 12 Sonny Puletasi – junior (6'3", 247); 31 Sam Awrabi – freshman (6'3", 245); 34 Siaosi Hala'api'api – sophomore (6'2", 240); 46 Deven McKenna – sophomore (6'2", 225); 52 Sam Hardy – freshman (6'3", 299); 54 James Diamanti – freshman (6'4", 296); 55 Eddie Yarbrough – sophomore (6'3", 253); 57 Chase Appleby – freshman (6'0", 289); 60 Du'Ryan Ebbesen – freshman (6'2", 301); 90 Uso Olive – freshman (6'1", 300); 91 Troy Boyland – junior (6'2", 310); 94 Adam Kinder – freshman (6'2", 206); 95 Patrick Mertens – senior (6'5", 295); 96 Justin Bernthaler – senior (6'2", 256); 97 Dan Crook – junior (6'3", 266); 98 Dalton Fields – freshman (6'3", 265)	Linebackers: 1 Jordan Stanton – junior (6'0", 246); 3 Jeff Lark – sophomore (6'2", 203); 8 Zack Berg – sophomore (6'2", 226); 9 Malkaam Muhammad – sophomore (6'0", 225); 12 Ruben Narcisse* – senior (6'1", 214); 15 Nehemie Kankolongo – junior (5'11", 208); 21 Mark Nzeocha – junior (6'3", 230); 22 Ryan Anaya – freshman (6'2", 240); 43 Devyn Harris – senior (6'3", 229); 44 J.J. Quinlan – senior (6'1", 238); 45 Lucas Wacha – freshman (6'1", 201); 47 Brandon Lukenbill – freshman (6'2", 224); 53 Alex Borgs – junior (6'2", 224); Defensive backs: 2 Marqueston Huff – senior (6'0", 195); 4 DeAndre Jones – junior (6'0", 180); 5 Jesse Sampson – junior (6'0", 188); 6 B.J. Hendrix Jr. – sophomore (5'11", 184); 7 Chad Reese – junior (5'11", 180); 13 Darrenn White – junior (6'0", 184); 14 Xavier Lewis – freshman (6'0", 190); 16 Cortland Fort – freshman (6'0", 182); 20 Blair Burns – junior (5'10", 180); 23 Tim Kamana – freshman (5'11", 185); 24 Zaquoya Parham – sophomore (5'10", 177); 29 Timmy Hayes – freshman (5'9", 185); 32 Jake Schiffner – junior (5'10", 181); 35 Cooper Wise – freshman (5'9", 170); 37 Luke Kellum – freshman (5'10", 184); 38 Julian Hawkins – junior (5'8", 169); Placekickers/Punters: 39 Justin Martin – sophomore (5'10", 178); 40 Stuart Williams – junior (5'11", 180); 91 Ethan Wood – freshman (6'3", 165); 92 Taylor King – freshman (5'9", 173); 93 Kris Mull – freshman (5'11", 155); Longsnapper: 94 Brendan Turelli – freshman (6'2", 240)

- The name of Ruben Narcisse, who died in a car accident on Sept. 6, 2010, remained on the Wyoming roster to honor him until his freshman class of 2010 graduated.

== Statistics ==
=== Team ===
Team statistics
	Wyoming	Opponents
Points	375	440
First downs	280	292
Rushing	107	138
Passing	152	138
Penalty	21	16
Rushing yards	2285	2642
Rushing attempts	449	570
Average oer rush	5.1	4.6
Long	79	62
Rushing TDs	21	27
Passing yards	3389	3142
Comp–att	297–473	273–396
Comp %	62.8%	68.9%
Average per game	282.8	261.8
Average per attempt	7.2	7.9
Passing TDs	29	32
INTs	12	9
Touchdowns	52	60
Passing	29	32
Rushing	21	27
Defensive	2	0
Interceptions	9	12
Yards	162	173
Long	50	42
Total offense	5674	5784
Total Plays	922	966
Average yard per game	472.8	482.0
Kick returns: # – yards	31–523	27–586
TDs	0	0
Long	33	42
Punts	70	66
Yards	2933	3012
Average	41.9	45.6
Punt returns: # – yards	19–88	26–204
TDs	0	1
Long	22	64
Fumbles – fumbles lost	24–12	20–11
Opposing TD's	60	52
Penalties – yards	66–592	69–580
3rd–down conversions	85/188	80/193
4th–down conversions	10/22	17/24
Takeaways	21	23
Field goals	4–7	7–14
Extra points	47–48	53–56
Sacks	23	27
Sack against	27	23
Yards	162	190

=== Offense ===
Passing statistics
NAME	GP	CMP	ATT	YDS	CMP%	TD	INT
Brett Smith	12	293	467	3375	62.7	29	11
Tom Thornton	4	3	4	15	75.0	0	0
Trey Norman	10	2	5	23	40.7	0	1
Nathan Leddige	12	1	1	-1	100.0	0	0
Sam Stratton	12	0	0	0	0.0	0	0
TOTALS	12	297	473	3389	62.8	29	12

Rushing statistics
NAME	GP	CAR	YDS	LONG	TD
Shaun Wick	12	166	979	67	9
Brett Smith	12	125	573	74	4
Brandon Miller	11	83	385	29	3
Tedder Easton	12	45	311	79	5
Omar Stover	4	10	37	11	0
Robert Herron	12	2	12	8	0
Tom Thornton	4	6	8	11	0
Dominic Rufran	12	1	1	1	0
TEAM	8	10	-9	0	0
Sam Stratton	12	1	-12	0	0
TOTALS	12	449	2285	79	21

Receiving statistics
NAME	GP	REC	YDS	LONG	TD
Dominic Rufran	12	75	960	71	8
Robert Herron	12	72	937	93	9
Tanner Gentry	12	39	376	31	0
Jalen Claiborne	11	33	452	71	5
Brandon Miller	11	23	193	25	2
Shaun Wick	12	21	118	14	2
Jake Maulhardt	11	9	76	14	1
Jarrod Darden	6	6	49	19	0
Keenan Montgomery	11	5	102	72	1
Trey Norman	10	5	81	30	0
Spencer Bruce	12	3	23	14	1
Tedder Easton	12	3	4	4	0
Justin Berger	9	2	19	11	0
Marqueston Huff	12	1	-1	0	0
TOTALS	12	297	3389	93	29

=== Defense ===
Defensive statistics
#	NAME	GP	SOLO	AST	TOT	TFL-YDS	SACKS	INT-YDS	BU	QBH	FR–YDS	FF	BLK	SAF
1	Jordan Stanton	12	71	63	134	10.0–20	2.0–7	2–51	0	0	0–0	0	0	0
2	Marqueston Huff	12	74	53	127	3.0–6	0.0–0	2–0	6	0	2–0	1	1	0
10	Mark Nzeocha	12	64	37	101	10.0–36	1.0–8	0–0	2	0	0–0	2	0	0
55	Eddie Yarbrough	12	41	48	89	12.0–60	6.5–45	0–0	1	0	2–48	2	1	0
45	Lucas Wacha	12	41	47	88	2.0–10	1.0–9	0–0	1	1	2–0	1	0	0
20	Blair Burns	12	38	23	61	1.0–2	0.0–0	1–33	7	0	1–0	0	0	0
43	Devyn Harris	12	28	21	49	3.5–11	1.0–8	0–0	1	1	2–5	0	0	0
12	Sonny Puletasi	12	19	28	47	10.0–48	4.5–35	0–0	3	1	0–0	0	1	0
96	Justin Bernthaler	12	20	26	46	7.5–39	4.5–31	0–0	0	0	0–0	1	0	0
4	DeAndre Jones	12	25	14	39	1.0–1	0.0–0	1–22	1	0	1–0	1	0	0
7	Chad Reese	7	25	14	39	0.0–0	0.0–0	0–0	0	0	0–0	0	0	0
29	Tim Hayes	11	31	5	36	2.0–4	0.0–0	1–0	6	0	0–0	0	0	0
95	Patrick Mertens	12	10	24	34	5.0–21	2.0–15	0–0	0	0	1–0	1	0	0
13	Darrenn White	6	20	8	28	0.5–1	0.0–0	0–0	1	0	0–0	2	0	0
90	Uso Olive	11	13	12	25	4.0–12	0.5–4	0–0	0	0	0–0	0	0	0
18	Xavier Lewis	12	9	9	18	1.0–1	0.0–0	0–0	3	0	0–0	0	0	0
5	Jesse Sampson	4	7	5	12	1.0–2	0.0–0	1–6	1	0	0–0	0	0	0
34	Siaosi Hala'api'api	10	6	5	11	1.5–1	0.0–0	0–0	1	0	0–0	1	0	0
2	Cortland Fort	11	6	2	8	0.0–0	0.0–0	1–50	1	0	0–0	0	0	0
9	Malkaam Muhammad	11	2	6	8	0.0–0	0.0–0	0–0	0	0	0–0	0	0	0
14	Tyran Finley	1	2	3	5	0.0–0	0.0–0	0–0	0	0	0–0	0	0	0
83	Jake Maulhardt	11	1	4	5	0.0–0	0.0–0	0–0	0	0	0–0	0	0	0
16	Brett Smith	12	3	0	3	0.0–0	0.0–0	0–0	0	0	0–0	0	0	0
53	Alex Borgs	12	1	2	3	0.0–0	0.0–0	0–0	0	0	0–0	0	0	0
94	Brendan Turelli	12	0	3	3	0.0–0	0.0–0	0–0	0	0	0–0	0	0	0
6	Robert Herron	12	3	0	3	0.0–0	0.0–0	0–0	0	0	0–0	0	0	0
28	Nehemie Kankolongo	10	2	1	3	0.0–0	0.0–0	0–0	0	0	0–0	1	0	0
6	B.J. Hendrix Jr.	2	0	2	2	0.0–0	0.0–0	0–0	0	0	0–0	0	0	0
41	Ethan Wood	12	1	1	2	0.0–0	0.0–0	0–0	0	0	0–0	0	0	0
27	Oscar Nevermann	12	0	1	1	0.0–0	0.0–0	0–0	0	0	0–0	0	0	0
73	Chase Roullier	10	1	0	1	0.0–0	0.0–0	0–0	0	0	0–0	0	0	0
65	Jessee Wilson	1	1	0	1	0.0–0	0.0–0	0–0	0	0	0–0	0	0	0
72	Jake Jones	12	1	0	1	0.0–0	0.0–0	0–0	0	0	0–0	0	0	0
39	Justin Martin	5	0	1	1	0.0–0	0.0–0	0–0	0	0	0–0	0	0	0
1	Jalen Claiborne	11	1	0	1	0.0–0	0.0–0	0–0	0	0	0–0	0	0	0
21	Shaun Wick	12	1	0	1	0.0–0	0.0–0	0–0	0	0	0–0	0	0	0
	TOTAL	12	568	468	1036	75–275	23–162	9–162	35	3	11–53	13	3	0
	OPPONENTS	12	522	362	884	64–276	27–190	12–173	42	19	12–58	14	1	0

Key: SOLO: Solo Tackles, AST: Assisted Tackles, TOT: Total Tackles, TFL: Tackles-for-loss, SACK: Quarterback Sacks, INT: Interceptions, BU: Passes Broken Up, QBH: Quarterback Hits, FF: Forced Fumbles, FR: Fumbles Recovered, BLK: Kicks or Punts Blocked, SAF: Safeties

Interceptions statistics
NAME	NO.	YDS	AVG	TD	LNG
Jordan Stanton	2	51	25.5	1	39
Marqueston Huff	2	0	0.0	0	0
DeAndre Jones	1	22	22.0	0	22
Tim Hayes	1	0	0.0	0	0
Cortland Fort	1	50	50.0	1	50
Blair Burns	1	33	33.0	0	33
Jesse Sampson	1	6	6.0	0	6
TOTALS	9	162	18.0	2	50

=== Special teams ===
Kicking statistics
NAME	XPM	XPA	XP%	FGM	FGA	FG%	1–19	20–29	30–39	40–49	50+	LNG	PTS
Stuart Williams	47	48	97.9%	4	7	57.1%	0–0	2–2	1–3	1–1	0–1	43	59
TOTALS	47	48	97.9%	4	7	57.1%	0–0	2–2	1–3	1–1	0–1	43	59

Kick return statistics
NAME	RTNS	YDS	AVG	TD	LNG
Jalen Claiborne	16	293	18.3	0	33
Trey Norman	6	105	17.5	0	27
Shaun Wick	3	58	19.3	0	21
J.J. Quinlan	3	16	5.3	0	12
Robert Herron	1	14	14.0	0	14
Brandon Miller	1	19	19.0	0	18
Tyran Finley	1	18	18.0	0	18
TOTALS	31	523	16.9	0	33

Punting statistics
NAME	PUNTS	YDS	AVG	LONG	TB	FC	I–20	50+	BLK
Ethan Wood	69	2899	42.0	64	8	4	17	13	0
Stuart Williams	1	34	34.0	34	0	0	1	0	0
TOTALS	70	2933	41.9	64	8	4	18	13	0

Punt return statistics
NAME	RTNS	YDS	AVG	TD	LONG
Jalen Claiborne	13	42	3.2	0	15
Dominic Rufran	3	51	17.0	0	22
TEAM	2	0	0.0	0	3
Blair Burns	1	-5	-5.0	0	0
TOTALS	19	88	4.6	0	22

=== Scores by quarter (all opponents) ===
	1	2	3	4	OT	Total
All opponents	76	111	130	123	0	440
Wyoming	78	137	60	97	3	375
