= 2013 Utah State Aggies football team =

American college football season

2013 Utah State Aggies football

MW Mountain Division champion Poinsettia Bowl champion

MW Championship Game, L 17–24 vs. Fresno State

Poinsettia Bowl, W 21–14 vs. Northern Illinois
- Conference: Mountain West Conference
- Mountain Division
- Record: 9–5 (7–1 MW)
- Head coach: Matt Wells (1st season)
- Offensive coordinator: Kevin McGiven (1st season)
- Offensive scheme: Spread
- Defensive coordinator: Todd Orlando (1st season)
- Base defense: 3–4
- Home stadium: Romney Stadium

2013 Mountain West Conference football standings
	Conf.			Overall
Team	W		L	W		L
Mountain Division
Utah State x	7	–	1	9	–	5
Boise State	6	–	2	8	–	5
Colorado State	5	–	3	8	–	6
Wyoming	3	–	5	5	–	7
New Mexico	1	–	7	3	–	9
Air Force	0	–	8	2	–	10
West Division
Fresno State x$	7	–	1	11	–	2
San Diego State	6	–	2	8	–	5
UNLV	5	–	3	7	–	6
San Jose State	5	–	3	6	–	6
Nevada	3	–	5	4	–	8
Hawaii	0	–	8	1	–	11
Championship: Fresno State 24, Utah State 17
$ – Conference champion; x – Division champion/co-champions; Rankings from AP Poll

The 2013 Utah State Aggies football team represented Utah State University in the 2013 NCAA Division I FBS football season. The Aggies were led by new head coach Matt Wells and played their home games at Merlin Olsen Field at Romney Stadium. This was the Aggies first season as members of the Mountain West Conference in the Mountain Division.

== Before the season ==
=== 2013 recruits ===
College recruiting (2013)
Name	Hometown	School	Height	Weight	Commit date
Caden Andersen; DL	Logan, Utah	Logan	6 ft 3 in (1.91 m)	245 lb (111 kg)	
Caden Andersen; DL	Recruit ratings: No ratings found				
Cody Boyer; OL	St. George, Utah	Pineview	6 ft 6 in (1.98 m)	262 lb (119 kg)	
Cody Boyer; OL	Recruit ratings: No ratings found				
Andrew Chen; OL	West Hills, Calif.	Chaminade College Prep	6 ft 3 in (1.91 m)	260 lb (120 kg)	
Andrew Chen; OL	Recruit ratings: No ratings found				
Tyler Fox; WR	Layton, Utah	Layton	5 ft 11 in (1.80 m)	160 lb (73 kg)	
Tyler Fox; WR	Recruit ratings: No ratings found				
Darell Garretson; QB	Chandler, Ariz	Chandler	6 ft 0 in (1.83 m)	200 lb (91 kg)	
Darell Garretson; QB	Recruit ratings: No ratings found				
Braden Harris; LB	Gunnison, Utah	Gunnison Valley	6 ft 3 in (1.91 m)	220 lb (100 kg)	
Braden Harris; LB	Recruit ratings: No ratings found				
Wyatt Houston; TE	Tualatin, Ore	Horizon Christian	6 ft 5 in (1.96 m)	245 lb (111 kg)	
Wyatt Houston; TE	Recruit ratings: No ratings found				
Karris Johnson; RB	San Ramon, Calif.	California	5 ft 11 in (1.80 m)	205 lb (93 kg)	
Karris Johnson; RB	Recruit ratings: No ratings found				
Joe Malanga; OL	South Jordan, Utah	Bingham	6 ft 4 in (1.93 m)	260 lb (120 kg)	
Joe Malanga; OL	Recruit ratings: No ratings found				
Tyshon Mosely; OL	Sandy, Utah	Jordan	6 ft 5 in (1.96 m)	305 lb (138 kg)	
Tyshon Mosely; OL	Recruit ratings: No ratings found				
Dax Raymond; TE	Provo, Utah	Timpview	6 ft 5 in (1.96 m)	210 lb (95 kg)	
Dax Raymond; TE	Recruit ratings: No ratings found				
Zach Swenson; S	Salt Lake City, Utah	East	6 ft 1 in (1.85 m)	185 lb (84 kg)	
Zach Swenson; S	Recruit ratings: No ratings found				
Jake Thompson; K	Logan, Utah	Logan	6 ft 0 in (1.83 m)	200 lb (91 kg)	
Jake Thompson; K	Recruit ratings: No ratings found				
Myron Turner; S	DeSoto, Texas	DeSota	5 ft 11 in (1.80 m)	170 lb (77 kg)	
Myron Turner; S	Recruit ratings: No ratings found				
Hayden Weichers; WR	South Jordan, Utah	Bingham	6 ft 0 in (1.83 m)	170 lb (77 kg)	
Hayden Weichers; WR	Recruit ratings: No ratings found				
Jacoby Wildman; DL	Logan, Utah	Logan	6 ft 3 in (1.91 m)	260 lb (120 kg)	
Jacoby Wildman; DL	Recruit ratings: No ratings found				
Ronald Butler; WR	Jersey City, N.J.	Contra Costa College	6 ft 0 in (1.83 m)	190 lb (86 kg)	
Ronald Butler; WR	Recruit ratings: No ratings found				
Marwin Evans; CB	Oak Creek, Wis	Highland CC	6 ft 1 in (1.85 m)	190 lb (86 kg)	
Marwin Evans; CB	Recruit ratings: No ratings found				
Rashad Hall; RB	Lynchburg, Va.	Contra Costa College	6 ft 1 in (1.85 m)	205 lb (93 kg)	
Rashad Hall; RB	Recruit ratings: No ratings found				
Keylon Hollis; LB	Houston, Texas	Bakersfield College	6 ft 2 in (1.88 m)	235 lb (107 kg)	
Keylon Hollis; LB	Recruit ratings: No ratings found				
Jeremy Morris; CB	Chandler, Ariz.	Mesa CC	5 ft 11 in (1.80 m)	185 lb (84 kg)	
Jeremy Morris; CB	Recruit ratings: No ratings found				
Ryan Watson; WR	Decatur, Ala.	Golden West College	6 ft 0 in (1.83 m)	180 lb (82 kg)	
Ryan Watson; WR	Recruit ratings: No ratings found				
Overall recruit ranking: Scout: 123 Rivals: Not Ranked Top 50 ESPN: Not Ranked Top 25
Note: In many cases, Scout, Rivals, 247Sports, On3, and ESPN may conflict in their listings of height and weight.; In these cases, the average was taken. ESPN grades are on a 100-point scale.; Sources: "Utah State 2013 Football Commitments". Rivals.; "2013 Utah State Football Commits". Scout.; "2013 Player Commits". ESPN.; "Scout.com Team Recruiting Rankings". Scout.; "2013 Team Ranking". Rivals.com.

=== Blue-White Spring Game presented by Orbit Irrigation Products ===
The Spring Game will take place on April 20, 2013, featuring the squad divided into a blue team and a white team.

=== Departures ===
Among the departures are a former head coach Gary Andersen, who left to be the head coach of Wisconsin. A number of other coaches left with him.

==== NFL draft ====
Name	Number	Pos.	Class	Team	Round	Pick
Will Davis	17	CB	Senior	Miami Dolphins	3	93
Kerwynn Williams	25	RB	Senior	Indianapolis Colts	7	230

== Roster ==
2013 Utah State Aggies football team roster
Players
Coaches
Offense

Pos.	#	Name	Class
OC	59	Austin Stephens	So
OC	58	Tyler Larsen	Sr
OL	74	Kevin Whimpey	Jr
OL	65	Austin Albrecht	Fr
OL	72	Tyshon Mosley	Fr
OL	64	Jarom Ioane	Fr
OL	79	Logan Malohifo'ou	So
OL	78	Joe Malanga	Fr
OL	77	Sini Tauauve'a	Sr
OL	73	Kyle Whimpey	Sr
OL	76	Jake Simonich	Fr
OL	75	Taani Fisilau	So
OL	62	Bryce Walker	Jr
OL	61	Daquan Vandross	Jr
OL	54	Jamie Markosian	Sr
OL	60	Joe Summers	Jr
OL	68	Bill Vavau	Jr
OL	67	Brandon Taukeiaho	Fr
OL	66	Eric Schultz	Sr
OT	55	Andrew Chen	Fr
QB	12	Craig Harrison	Jr
QB	13	Jordan Brown	Fr
QB	17	Jeff Manning	Fr
QB	16	Chuckie Keeton	Jr
QB	6	Darell Garretson	Fr
RB	10	Kelvin Lee	So
RB	32	Joe Hill	Jr
RB	31	Paul Clark	Jr
RB	20	Rashad Hall	Jr
RB	30	Karris Johnson	Fr
RB	28	Joey DeMartino	Sr
RB	27	Robert Marshall	Sr
RB	30	Kennedy Williams	Fr
TE	92	Derek Keller	So
TE	22	Keegan Andersen	Jr
TE	33	Jefferson Court	Jr
TE	91	D.J. Tialavea	Sr
TE	83	Wyatt Houston	Fr
WR	86	Nick Markosian	Fr
WR	87	Brock Bird	So
WR	88	Braelon Roberts	Fr
WR	8	Travis Reynolds	Sr
WR	11	Brandon Swindall	So
WR	80	Lars Gunderson	Jr
WR	81	Alex Wheat, Jr.	Jr
WR	25	Hayden Weichers	Fr
WR	9	Bruce Natson	So
WR	18	Ronald Butler	Jr
WR	84	Shaan Johnson	Jr
WR	85	Tyler Weese	Fr
WR	7	Travis Van Leeuwen	Sr
WR	15	Daniel Wray	So

Defense

Pos.	#	Name	Class
CB	31	Jentz Painter	So
CB	1	Nevin Lawson	Sr
CB	4	Tay Glover-Wright	Sr
CB	6	Rashard Stewart	Jr
CB	1	Daniel Gray	So
CB	37	Devin Centers	Fr
CB	3	Quinton Byrd	Sr
CB	24	Marwin Evans	Jr
CB	22	Dre Snowden	Fr
CB	17	Jeremy Morris	Jr
CB	15	Marquan Ellison	Fr
CB	13	Ladale Jackson	So
DE	99	B.J. Larsen	Jr
DE	90	Clark Jeppesen	Fr
DE	48	Paul Piukala	Sr
DE	98	Josh Romero	Fr
DE	40	Connor Williams	Sr
DE	97	Jordan Nielsen	So
DL	95	Ricky Ali'ifua	Fr
DL	94	Eric Berntson	Fr
DL	70	Travis Seefeldt	So
DL	57	Jake Gallegos	Fr
LB	51	Jake Doughty	Sr
LB	43	Alex Marsaw	So
LB	16	Tavaris McMillian	Jr
LB	53	Zach Vigil	Jr
LB	50	Brayden Stembridge	Jr
LB	49	Jarom Baldomero	So
LB	12	Terrell Thompson	Sr
LB	47	Travis Parrish	Fr
LB	23	Michael Okonkwo	So
LB	45	Keylon Hollis	Jr
LB	44	Bridger Peck	Fr
LB	42	La'Bradford Harold	So
LB	41	Nick Vigil	Fr
LB	9	Kyler Fackrell	So
LB	39	Torrey Green	So
LB	82	Alex Huerta	Fr
LB	34	Dustin Hoover	Fr
NG	96	Elvis Kamana-Matagi	Jr
NG	56	AJ Pataiali'i	Sr
S	2	Cameron Sanders	Sr
S	46	Frankie Sutera	Jr
S	19	Dayton DeLoach	Fr
S	26	Clayton Christensen	Sr
S	21	Brian Suite	Jr
S	29	Myron Turner	Fr
S	32	Nick Chronister	Fr
S	5	Maurice Alexander	Sr

Special teams

Pos.	#	Name	Class
K	36	Jake Thompson	Fr
LS	89	Nate Needham	Jr
LS	47	Mark Hutchinson	So
P/K	38	Jaron Bentrude	Jr
PK	19	Josh Thompson	Sr
PK	63	Brock Warren	Fr
PK	93	Nick Diaz	Jr
PK	32	Braeden Loveless	Fr

Head coach

- Matt Wells (Utah State)

Coordinators/assistant coaches

- Mark Weber (Idaho State)
  Asst. head coach/offensive line
- Kevin McGiven (Utah Valley)
  Co-offensive coordinator/quarterbacks
- Todd Orlando (Wisconsin)
  Defensive coordinator/safeties
- Dave Ungerer (Southern Connecticut)
  Special teams/running backs
- Luke Wells (Oklahoma)
  Co-offensive coordinator/TE/recruiting coordinator
- Jovon Bouknight (Wyoming)
  Wide receivers
- Kevin Clune (Cal State Fullerton)
  Linebackers
- Frank Maile (Utah State)
  Defensive line
- Kendrick Shaver (Missouri State)
  Cornerbacks
- Kite Afeaki (Utah)
  Defensive administrative assistant
- Waqa Damuni (Utah State)
  Asst. athletics director for football operations
- David Fiefia (Utah State)
  Offensive graduate assistant
- Cole Popovich (Fresno State)
  Offensive graduate assistant
- Nick Schindler (Utah State)
  Defensive & special teams administrative assistant
- Dave Scholz (Milwaukee)
  Head strength & conditioning coach
- Rob Takeno (Southern Utah)
  Defensive graduate assistant

Legend

- (C) Team captain
- (S) Suspended
- (I) Ineligible
- Injured
- Redshirt

Roster

== Schedule ==
Date	Time	Opponent	Site	TV	Result	Attendance
August 29	6:00 pm	at Utah*	Rice-Eccles Stadium; Salt Lake City, UT (Beehive Boot and Battle of the Brothers)	FS1	L 26–30	45,237
September 7	1:30 pm	at Air Force	Falcon Stadium; Colorado Springs, CO	CBSSN	W 52–20	32,716
September 14	6:00 pm	Weber State*	Romney Stadium; Logan, UT	ESPN3	W 70–6	25,513
September 21	1:30 pm	at USC*	Los Angeles Memorial Coliseum; Los Angeles, CA	ABC/ESPN2	L 14–17	63,482
September 27	7:00 pm	at San Jose State	Spartan Stadium; San Jose, CA	ESPN	W 40–12	10,533
October 4	6:00 pm	BYU*	Romney Stadium; Logan, UT (Beehive Boot and The Old Wagon Wheel)	CBSSN	L 14–31	25,513
October 12	6:00 pm	Boise State	Romney Stadium; Logan, UT	CBSSN	L 23–34	25,513
October 19	7:00 pm	at New Mexico	University Stadium; Albuquerque, NM	RTUT	W 45–10	19,739
November 2	2:00 pm	Hawaii	Romney Stadium; Logan, UT	CBSSN	W 47–10	21,428
November 9	6:00 pm	at UNLV	Sam Boyd Stadium; Whitney, NV	ESPNU	W 28–24	15,062
November 23	1:30 pm	Colorado State	Romney Stadium; Logan, UT	CBSSN	W 13–0	20,284
November 30	12:00 pm	Wyoming	Romney Stadium; Logan, UT (rivalry)	RTUT	W 35–7	21,325
December 7	8:00 pm	at No. 24 Fresno State	Bulldog Stadium; Fresno, CA (MW Championship Game)	CBS	L 17–24	31,362
December 26	7:30 pm	vs. No. 24 Northern Illinois*	Qualcomm Stadium; San Diego, CA (Poinsettia Bowl)	ESPN	W 21–14	23,408
*Non-conference game; Rankings from AP Poll released prior to the game; All times are in Mountain time

== Game summaries ==
=== Utah ===
Utah State at Utah

Team	1	2	3	4	Total
Aggies	3	14	6	3	26
• Utes	14	0	10	6	30

- Date: August 29
- Location: Rice-Eccles Stadium
  Salt Lake City, UT
- Game start: 6:06 p.m. MST
- Elapsed time: 3:31
- Game attendance: 45,237
- Game weather: 90 °F (32 °C), Partly Cloudy, winds NW at 6mph
- Referee: Kevin Marr
- TV announcers (FS1): Justin Kutcher, Petros Papadakis, and Kristina Pink

Scoring summary

Quarter	Time	Drive			Team	Scoring information	Score	
Quarter	Time	Plays	Yards	TOP	Team	Scoring information	Utah State	Utah
1	11:47	7	82	3:13	Utah	Dres Anderson 3-yard touchdown reception from Travis Wilson, Andy Phillips kick good	0	7
1	7:37	12	66	4:10	Utah State	26-yard field goal by Nick Diaz	3	7
1	1:37	7	80	2:11	Utah	Jake Murphy 30-yard touchdown reception from Travis Wilson, Andy Phillips kick good	3	14
2	14:11	9	75	2:26	Utah State	Brand Swindall 15-yard touchdown reception from Chuckie Keeton, Nick Diaz kick good	10	14
2	0:20	10	85	3:10	Utah State	Brand Swindall 4-yard touchdown reception from Chuckie Keeton, Nick Diaz kick good	17	14
3	11:52	10	75	3:08	Utah State	Chuckie Keeton 3-yard touchdown run, Nick Diaz kick no good	23	14
3	2:24	7	46	2:19	Utah	45-yard field goal by Andy Phillips	23	17
3	0:54	5	52	1:29	Utah	Karl Williams 2-yard touchdown run, Andy Phillips kick good	23	24
4	10:39	12	68	5:15	Utah State	24-yard field goal by Nick Diaz	26	24
4	6:38	10	74	4:01	Utah	19-yard field goal by Andy Phillips	26	27
4	0:19	10	50	4:22	Utah	38-yard field goal by Andy Phillips	26	30
"TOP" = time of possession. For other American football terms, see Glossary of American football.							26	30

=== Air Force ===
Utah State at Air Force

Team	1	2	3	4	Total
• Aggies	14	10	21	7	52
Falcons	6	7	0	7	20

- Date: September 7
- Location: Falcon Stadium
  Colorado Springs, CO
- Game start: 1:34 p.m. MST
- Elapsed time: 3:26
- Game attendance: 32,716
- Game weather: 85 °F (29 °C), Sunny & hot, winds SE at 10mph
- Referee: David Alvarez
- TV announcers (CBSSN): Dave Ryan, Adam Archuleta & Evan Washburn

Scoring summary

Quarter	Time	Drive			Team	Scoring information	Score	
Quarter	Time	Plays	Yards	TOP	Team	Scoring information	Utah St	Air Force
1	12:50	6	75	2:10	Utah State	Travis Van Leeuwen 30-yard touchdown reception from Chuckie Keeton, Nick Diaz kick good	7	0
1	11:17	4	35	1:28	Utah State	Joe Hill 1-yard touchdown run, Nick Diaz kick good	14	0
1	8:07	11	69	3:03	Air Force	33-yard field goal by Will Conant	14	3
1	3:19	11	21	4:40	Air Force	34-yard field goal by Will Conant	14	6
2	9:16	9	72	3:16	Utah State	Joey DeMartino 2-yard touchdown run, Nick Diaz kick good	21	6
2	3:20	13	75	5:56	Air Force	Jaleel Awini 3-yard touchdown run, Will Conant kick good	21	13
2	0:12	5	20	0:37	Utah State	41-yard field goal by Nick Diaz	24	13
3	9:44	10	89	3:16	Utah State	Ronald Butler 23-yard touchdown reception from Chuckie Keeton, Nick Diaz kick good	31	13
3	6:38	3	32	1:08	Utah State	Joe Hill 20-yard touchdown reception from Chuckie Keeton, Nick Diaz kick good	38	13
3	2:56	7	69	2:36	Utah State	Travis Reynolds 36-yard touchdown reception from Chuckie Keeton, Nick Diaz kick good	45	13
4	11:53	13	70	5:12	Utah State	Keega Andersen 1-yard touchdown reception from Chuckie Keeton, Nick Diaz kick good	52	13
4	8:04	9	75	3:49	Air Force	Jale Robinette 37-yard touchdown reception from Karson Roberts, Bricett Cannada kick good	52	20
"TOP" = time of possession. For other American football terms, see Glossary of American football.							52	20

=== Weber State ===
Weber State at Utah State

Team	1	2	3	4	Total
Wildcats	0	0	0	6	6
• Aggies	21	28	21	0	70

- Date: September 14
- Location: Romney Stadium
  Logan, UT
- Game start: 6:04 MST
- Elapsed time: 3:05
- Game attendance: 25,513
- Game weather: Warm and Muggy
- Referee: Eddy Shelton
- TV announcers (ESPN3): Joel Meyers & Kevin O'Connell

Scoring summary

Quarter	Time	Drive			Team	Scoring information	Score	
Quarter	Time	Plays	Yards	TOP	Team	Scoring information	Weber St	Utah St
1	10:41	6	60	2:10	Utah State	D.J. Tialavea 5-yard touchdown reception from Chuckie Keeton, Nick Diaz kick good	0	7
1	6:38	8	58	2:46	Utah State	Joey DeMartino 11-yard touchdown run, Nick Diaz kick good	0	14
1	3:52	4	53	1:15	Utah State	Travis Reynolds 39-yard touchdown reception from Chuckie Keeton, Nick Diaz kick good	0	21
2	14:53	8	65	2:31	Utah State	Kyler Fackrell 4-yard touchdown reception from Chuckie Keeton, Nick Diaz kick good	0	28
2	11:26	6	30	1:45	Utah State	Ronald Butler 15-yard touchdown reception from Chuckie Keeton, Nick Diaz kick good	0	35
2	6:30	8	78	2:54	Utah State	Joey DeMartino 7-yard touchdown run, Chuckie Keeton kick good	0	42
2	3:47	5	45	1:40	Utah State	D. J. Tialavea 8-yard touchdown reception from Chuckie Keeton, Nick Diaz kick good	0	49
3	11:48	2	70	0:22	Utah State	Joey DeMartino 60-yard touchdown run, Andy Phillips kick good	0	56
3	10:13	1	56	0:19	Utah State	Keega Andersen 59-yard touchdown reception from Craig Harrison, Josh Thompson kick good	0	63
3	9:59	1	2	0:04	Utah State	Robert Marshall 3=2-yard touchdown run, Nick Diaz kick good	0	70
4	0:50				Weber State	Spencer Unga 38-yard fumble returned for a touchdown, Carson Fackrell kick blocked	6	30
"TOP" = time of possession. For other American football terms, see Glossary of American football.							6	70

=== USC ===
Utah State at USC

Team	1	2	3	4	Total
Aggies	0	7	7	0	14
• Trojans	7	7	0	3	17

- Date: September 21
- Location: Los Angeles Memorial Coliseum
  Los Angeles, CA
- Game start: 12:36 p.m. PST
- Elapsed time: 3:19
- Game attendance: 63,482
- Game weather: 72 °F (22 °C), Scattered clouds, winds SSW at 5mph
- Referee: Terry Leyden
- TV announcers (ABC/ESPN2; ESPN Radio): Dave Flemming, David Diaz-Infante & Shelley Smith (ABC/ESPN2)
  Rich Cellini, Tom Ramsey & Dave Shore (ESPN Radio)

Scoring summary

Quarter	Time	Drive			Team	Scoring information	Score	
Quarter	Time	Plays	Yards	TOP	Team	Scoring information	Utah St	USC
1	5:41	7	45	2:48	USC	Tre Madden 1-yard touchdown run, Andre Heidari kick good	0	7
2	13:17	7	78	1:35	Utah State	Brand Swindall 8-yard touchdown reception from Chuckie Keeton, Nick Diaz kick good	7	7
2	5:13	9	70	5:07	USC	Xavier Grimble 30-yard touchdown reception from Cody Kessler, Andre Heidari kick good	7	14
3	6:51	9	72	3:23	Utah State	Travis Reynolds 10-yard touchdown reception from Chuckie Keeton, Nick Diaz kick good	14	14
4	13:35	6	16	2:21	USC	25-yard field goal by Andre Heidari	14	17
"TOP" = time of possession. For other American football terms, see Glossary of American football.							14	17

=== San Jose State ===
Utah State at San Jose State

Team	1	2	3	4	Total
• Aggies	14	9	14	3	40
Spartans	3	3	6	0	12

- Date: September 27
- Location: Spartan Stadium
  San Jose, CA
- Game start: 6:01 MST
- Elapsed time: 3:49
- Game attendance: 10,533
- Game weather: Sunny and clear
- Referee: Alan Eck
- Television network: ESPN

Scoring summary

Quarter	Time	Drive			Team	Scoring information	Score	
Quarter	Time	Plays	Yards	TOP	Team	Scoring information	Utah St	San Jose St
1	11:36	10	75	3:24	Utah State	D.J. Tialavea 3-yard touchdown reception from Chuckie Keeton, Nick Diaz kick good	7	0
1	8:01	15	69	3:35	San Jose State	31-yard field goal by Austin Lopez	7	3
1	3:09	7	80	2:00	Utah State	Keegan Andersen 5-yard touchdown reception from Chuckie Keeton, Nick Diaz kick good	14	3
2	12:32	12	73	4:11	Utah State	24-yard field goal by Nick Diaz	17	3
2	7:59	4	6	1:27	Utah State	45-yard field goal by Nick Diaz	20	3
2	5:48	11	66	2:11	San Jose State	26-yard field goal by Austin Lopez	20	6
2	2:45	9	82	3:03	Utah State	24-yard field goal by Nick Diaz	23	6
3	6:12	11	75	4:14	Utah State	Brandon Swindall 17-yard touchdown reception from Chuckie Keeton, Nick Diaz kick good	30	6
3	3:02	7	54	1:58	San Jose State	Jason Simpson 1-yard touchdown run, 2-point pass failed	30	12
3	1:32	5	28	1:32	Utah State	Chuckie Keeton 9-yard touchdown run, Nick Diaz kick good	37	12
4	5:23	17	88	8:44	Utah State	21-yard field goal by Nick Diaz	40	12
"TOP" = time of possession. For other American football terms, see Glossary of American football.								

=== BYU ===
BYU at Utah State

Team	1	2	3	4	Total
• Cougars	10	7	14	0	31
Aggies	7	0	0	7	14

- Date: October 4
- Location: Romney Stadium
  Logan, UT
- Game start: 6:07 MST
- Elapsed time: 3:26
- Game attendance: 25,513
- Game weather: Partly Cloudy
- Referee: Rick Loumiet
- Television network: CBSSN

Scoring summary

Quarter	Time	Drive			Team	Scoring information	Score	
Quarter	Time	Plays	Yards	TOP	Team	Scoring information	BYU	Utah St
1	14:50				BYU	Interception returned 17 yards for touchdown by Kyle Van Noy, Justin Sorensen kick good	7	0
1	10:48	3	15	1:13	Utah State	Travis Van Leeuwen 7-yard touchdown reception from Chuckie Keeton, Nick Diaz kick good	7	7
2	7:04	14	67	3:44	BYU	27-yard field goal by Justin Sorensen	10	7
2	10:30	4	81	1:15	BYU	Mitch Mathews 30-yard touchdown reception from Taysom Hill, Justin Sorensen kick good	17	7
3	12:06	10	75	2:54	BYU	Mitch Mathews 6-yard touchdown reception from Taysom Hill, Justin Sorensen kick good	24	7
3	5:52	4	1:14	71	BYU	Mitch Mathews 43-yard touchdown reception from Taysom Hill, Justin Sorensen kick good	31	7
4	1:34	11	88	4:19	Utah State	Ronald Butler 8-yard touchdown reception from Craig Harrison, Nick Diaz kick good	31	14
"TOP" = time of possession. For other American football terms, see Glossary of American football.								

=== Boise State ===
Boise State at Utah State

Team	1	2	3	4	Total
• Broncos	10	14	10	0	34
Aggies	0	10	0	13	23

- Date: October 12
- Location: Romney Stadium
  Logan, UT
- Game start: 6:07 p.m. MST
- Elapsed time: 3:26
- Game attendance: 25,513
- Game weather: Overcast
- Referee: Jim Farmer
- Television network: CBSSN

Scoring summary

Quarter	Time	Drive			Team	Scoring information	Score	
Quarter	Time	Plays	Yards	TOP	Team	Scoring information	Boise St	Utah St
1	7:13	10	61	3:43	Boise State	Jay Ajayi 2-yard touchdown run, Dan Goodale kick good	7	0
1	4:18	5	44	0:58	Boise State	35-yard field goal by Dan Goodale	10	0
2	13:43	3	50	0:56	Utah State	Joey DeMartino 1-yard touchdown run, Nick Diaz kick good	10	7
2	9:03	13	91	4:35	Boise State	Joe Southwick 7-yard touchdown run, Dan Goodale kick good	17	7
2	3:04	9	89	3:13	Boise State	Aaron Burks 24-yard touchdown reception from Joe Southwick, Dan Goodale kick good	24	7
2	0:57	7	59	2:07	Utah State	33-yard field goal by Nick Diaz	24	10
3	9:33	11	69	4:18	Boise State	Shane Williams-Rhodes 2-yard touchdown reception from Joe Southwick, Dan Goodale kick good	31	10
3	2:29	10	63	3:47	Boise State	39-yard field goal by Dan Goodale	34	10
4	14:12				Utah State	Interception returned 65 yards for touchdown by Nevin Lawson, 2-point pass failed	34	16
4	0:20	14	91	5:26	Utah State	Travis Van Leeuwen 4-yard touchdown reception from Darell Garretson, Nick Diaz kick good	34	23
"TOP" = time of possession. For other American football terms, see Glossary of American football.								

=== New Mexico ===
Utah State at New Mexico

Team	1	2	3	4	Total
• Aggies	17	14	7	7	45
Lobos	0	3	0	7	10

- Date: October 19
- Location: University Stadium
  Albuquerque, NM
- Game start: 7:08 pm MST
- Elapsed time: 2:57
- Game attendance: 19,739
- Game weather: Clear
- Referee: Kevin Mar
- Television network: ROOT

Scoring summary

Quarter	Time	Drive			Team	Scoring information	Score	
Quarter	Time	Plays	Yards	TOP	Team	Scoring information	Utah St	New Mexico
1	13:28	1	8	0:04	Utah State	Joey DeMartino 8-yard touchdown run, Nick Diaz kick good	7	0
1	8:05	10	68	3:42	Utah State	Joey DeMartino 21-yard touchdown reception from Darell Garretson, Nick Diaz kick good	14	0
1	00:41	13	50	4:36	Utah State	24-yard field goal by Nick Diaz	17	0
2	7:56	13	75	7:39	New Mexico	24-yard field goal by Justus Adams	17	3
2	3:03	2	74	:26	Utah State	Joey DeMartino 32-yard touchdown run, Nick Diaz kick good	24	3
2	1:47	0	65	0:00	Utah State	Bruce Natson 65 yard punt return, Nick Diaz kick good	31	3
3	13:43	4	74	1:10	Utah State	Joey DeMartino 38-yard touchdown run, Nick Diaz kick good	38	3
4	8:00	7	87	3:27	Utah State	Jaron Bentrude 72-yard touchdown run, Nick Diaz kick good	45	3
4	06:21	4	75	1:39	New Mexico	Kasey Carrier 2-yard touchdown run, Justus Adams kick good	45	10
"TOP" = time of possession. For other American football terms, see Glossary of American football.								

=== Hawaii ===
Hawaii at Utah State

Team	1	2	3	4	Total
Warriors	3	0	7	0	10
• Aggies	10	13	17	7	47

- Date: November 2
- Location: Romney Stadium
  Logan, UT
- Game start: 2:05 p.m. MST
- Elapsed time: 3:15
- Game attendance: 21428
- Game weather: Clear
- Referee: Brandon Cruse
- Television network: CBSSN

Scoring summary

Quarter	Time	Drive			Team	Scoring information	Score	
Quarter	Time	Plays	Yards	TOP	Team	Scoring information	Hawaii	Utah St
1	9:43	12	80	5:17	Utah State	Bruce Natson 11-yard touchdown reception from Darrell Garretson, Nick Diaz kick good	0	7
1	6:55	10	58	2:48	Hawaii	33-yard field goal by Tyler Hadden	3	7
1	5:09	5	52	1:46	Utah State	40-yard field goal by Nick Diaz	3	10
2	14:27	10	88	4:06	Utah State	Joey DeMartino 4-yard touchdown run, Nick Diaz kick good	3	17
2	3:28	10	29	3:13	Utah State	32-yard field goal by Nick Diaz	3	20
2	00:50	5	21	0:40	Utah State	52-yard field goal by Jake Thompson	3	23
3	13:17	6	75	1:43	Hawaii	Keith Kirkwood 33-yard touchdown reception from Sean Schroeder, Tyler Hadden kick good	10	23
3	9:51	9	51	3:26	Utah State	32-yard field goal by Nick Diaz	10	26
3	06:20	5	71	2:25	Utah State	Travis Reynolds 30-yard touchdown reception from Darrell Garretson, Nick Diaz kick good	10	33
3	01:41				Utah State	Interception returned 99 yards for touchdown by Kyler Fackrell, Nick Diaz kick good	10	40
4	10:29	7	73	3:30	Utah State	Wyatt Houston 44-yard touchdown reception from Darrell Garretson, Nick Diaz kick good	10	47
"TOP" = time of possession. For other American football terms, see Glossary of American football.							10	47

=== UNLV ===
Utah State at UNLV

Team	1	2	3	4	Total
• Aggies	0	14	7	7	28
Rebels	7	10	0	7	24

- Date: November 9
- Location: Sam Boyd Stadium
  Las Vegas, NV
- Game start: 6:00 p.m. MST
- Elapsed time: 3:36
- Game attendance: 15062
- Game weather: Partly Cloudy
- Referee: Daniel Romero
- Television network: ESPNU

Scoring summary

Quarter	Time	Drive			Team	Scoring information	Score	
Quarter	Time	Plays	Yards	TOP	Team	Scoring information	Utah St	UNLV
1	08:23	9	58	4:36	UNLV	Marcus Sullivan 10-yard touchdown reception from Caleb Herring, Nolan Kohorst kick good	0	7
2	14:53	13	52	5:12	Utah State	Shaan Johnson 5-yard touchdown reception from Darell Garretson, Nick Diaz kick good	7	7
2	13:10	4	8	1:31	UNLV	29-yard field goal by Nolan Kohorst	7	10
2	11:16	5	67	1:48	Utah State	Bruce Natson 13-yard touchdown run, Nick Diaz kick good	14	10
2	03:10	6	66	2:44	UNLV	Tim Cornett 4-yard touchdown run, Nolan Kohorst kick good	14	17
3	03:09	7	88	2:24	Utah State	Joey DeMartino 1-yard touchdown run, Nick Diaz kick good	21	17
4	10:53	15	79	7:10	UNLV	Maika Mataele 4-yard touchdown reception from Caleb Herring, Nolan Kohorst kick good	21	24
4	03:56	11	82	3:52	Utah State	Bruce Natson 12-yard touchdown run, Nick Diaz kick good	28	24
"TOP" = time of possession. For other American football terms, see Glossary of American football.							28	24

=== Colorado State ===
Colorado State at Utah State

Team	1	2	3	4	Total
Rams	0	0	0	0	0
• Aggies	0	3	7	3	13

- Date: November 23
- Location: Romney Stadium
  Logan, UT
- Game start: 1:34 pm MST
- Elapsed time: 3:21
- Game attendance: 20284
- Game weather: Mostly Sunny
- Referee: Jim Farmer
- Television network: CBSSN

Scoring summary

Quarter	Time	Drive			Team	Scoring information	Score	
Quarter	Time	Plays	Yards	TOP	Team	Scoring information	Colorado St	Utah St
2	00:26	8	35	2:54	Utah State	24-yard field goal by Nick Diaz	0	3
3	10:21	11	69	4:34	Utah State	Joey DeMartino 1-yard touchdown run, Nick Diaz kick good	0	10
4	09:59	4	2	1:30	Utah State	44-yard field goal by Nick Diaz	0	13
"TOP" = time of possession. For other American football terms, see Glossary of American football.							0	13

=== Wyoming ===
Wyoming at Utah State

Team	1	2	3	4	Total
Cowboys	0	0	0	7	7
• Aggies	7	14	14	0	35

- Date: November 30
- Location: Romney Stadium
  Logan, UT
- Game start: 12:05 pm MST
- Elapsed time: 2:47
- Game attendance: 21325
- Game weather: Mostly Sunny
- Referee: Randy Christal
- Television network: ROOT

Scoring summary

Quarter	Time	Drive			Team	Scoring information	Score	
Quarter	Time	Plays	Yards	TOP	Team	Scoring information	Wyoming	Utah St
1	06:17	3	27	1:02	Utah State	Wyatt Houston 6-yard touchdown reception from Darell Garretson, Nick Diaz kick good	0	7
2	07:30		64		Utah State	64 yard Punt Return by Bruce Natson, Nick Diaz kick good	0	14
2	00:53	9	82	3:39	Utah State	Joey DeMartino 1-yard touchdown run, Nick Diaz kick good	0	21
3	06:00	3	10	0:42	Utah State	Bruce Natson 6-yard touchdown reception from Darell Garretson, Nick Diaz kick good	0	28
3	00:25	9	62	3:08	Utah State	Brandon Swindall 6-yard touchdown reception from Darell Garretson, Nick Diaz kick good	0	35
4	13:38	6	75	1:47	Wyoming	Dominic Rufran 60-yard touchdown reception from Brett Smith, Stuart Williams kick good	7	35
"TOP" = time of possession. For other American football terms, see Glossary of American football.							7	35

=== Fresno State ===
Utah State vs Fresno State

Team	1	2	3	4	Total
Aggies	0	7	0	10	17
• Bulldogs	3	14	7	0	24

- Date: November 30
- Location: Bulldog Stadium
  Fresno, CA
- Game start: 8:00 p.m. MST
- Elapsed time: 3:31
- Game attendance: 31362
- Game weather: Partly Cloudy
- Referee: Reggie Smith
- Television network: CBS

Scoring summary

Quarter	Time	Drive			Team	Scoring information	Score	
Quarter	Time	Plays	Yards	TOP	Team	Scoring information	Utah St	Fresno St
1	08:36	12	51	3:07	Fresno State	30-yard field goal by Colin McGuire	0	3
2	13:40	7	45	2:00	Fresno State	Marcel Jensen 3-yard touchdown reception from Derek Carr, Colin Mcguire kick good	0	10
2	07:17	14	66	4:54	Fresno State	Isaiah Burse 9-yard touchdown reception from Derek Carr, Colin Mcguire kick good	0	17
2	00:03	1	86		Utah State	Fumble recovery returned 86 yards for touchdown by Jake Doughty, Nick Diaz kick good	7	17
3	01:33	13	59	3:59	Fresno State	Davante Adams 3-yard touchdown reception from Derek Carr, Colin Mcguire kick good	7	24
4	11:55	13	78	4:38	Utah State	Bruce Natson 10-yard touchdown run, Nick Diaz kick good	14	24
4	09:00	7	35	2:54	Utah State	20-yard field goal by Nick Diaz	17	24
"TOP" = time of possession. For other American football terms, see Glossary of American football.							17	24

=== Northern Illinois ===
2013 Poinsettia Bowl
Northern Illinois vs. Utah State Aggies

Team	1	2	3	4	Total
• Aggies	3	3	7	8	21
#24 Huskies	0	7	0	7	14

- Date: December 26
- Location: Qualcomm Stadium
  San Diego, CA
- Game start: 6:35 pm PST
- Elapsed time: 2:58
- Game attendance: 23,408
- Game weather: Clear, cool
- Referee: Shawn Hochuli
- Television network: ESPN

Scoring summary

Quarter	Time	Drive			Team	Scoring information	Score	
Quarter	Time	Plays	Yards	TOP	Team	Scoring information	Utah St	Northern Illinois
1	06:56	8	32	3:23	Utah State	31-yard field goal by Nick Diaz	3	0
2	14:09	6	58	2:34	Utah State	39-yard field goal by Nick Diaz	6	0
2	08:17	15	78	5:52	Northern Illinois	Jordan Lynch 1-yard touchdown run, Mathew Sims kick good	6	7
3	11:57	7	31	2:51	Utah State	Brandon Swindall 5-yard touchdown reception from Darell Garretson, Nick Diaz kick good	13	7
4	04:14	17	80	7:19	Utah State	Joey DeMartino 1-yard touchdown run, 2-point pass good	21	7
4	01:44	13	57	2:30	Northern Illinois	Juwan Brescacin 15-yard touchdown reception from Jordan Lynch, Mathew Sims kick good	21	14
"TOP" = time of possession. For other American football terms, see Glossary of American football.							21	14
