= 2013 San Diego State Aztecs football team =

American college football season

Coordinates: 32.783103°N 117.119540°W

2013 San Diego State Aztecs football

Famous Idaho Potato Bowl champion

Famous Idaho Potato Bowl, W 49–24 vs. Buffalo
- Conference: Mountain West Conference
- West Division
- Record: 8–5 (6–2 MW)
- Head coach: Rocky Long (3rd season)
- Offensive coordinator: Bob Toledo (1st season)
- Offensive scheme: West Coast
- Base defense: 3–3–5
- Home stadium: Qualcomm Stadium

2013 Mountain West Conference football standings
	Conf.			Overall
Team	W		L	W		L
Mountain Division
Utah State x	7	–	1	9	–	5
Boise State	6	–	2	8	–	5
Colorado State	5	–	3	8	–	6
Wyoming	3	–	5	5	–	7
New Mexico	1	–	7	3	–	9
Air Force	0	–	8	2	–	10
West Division
Fresno State x$	7	–	1	11	–	2
San Diego State	6	–	2	8	–	5
UNLV	5	–	3	7	–	6
San Jose State	5	–	3	6	–	6
Nevada	3	–	5	4	–	8
Hawaii	0	–	8	1	–	11
Championship: Fresno State 24, Utah State 17
$ – Conference champion; x – Division champion/co-champions; Rankings from AP Poll

The 2013 San Diego State Aztecs football team represented San Diego State University in the 2013 NCAA Division I FBS football season. The Aztecs were led by third-year head coach Rocky Long and played their home games at Qualcomm Stadium. They were members of the West Division of the Mountain West Conference. They finished the season 8–5, 6–2 in Mountain West play to finish in second place in the West Division. They were invited to the Famous Idaho Potato Bowl where they defeated Buffalo.

== Schedule ==
Date	Time	Opponent	Site	TV	Result	Attendance
August 31	5:00 p.m.	No. 21 (FCS) Eastern Illinois*	Qualcomm Stadium; San Diego, CA		L 19–40	42,978
September 7	12:30 p.m.	at No. 3 Ohio State*	Ohio Stadium; Columbus, OH	ABC	L 7–42	104,984
September 21	4:30 p.m.	Oregon State*	Qualcomm Stadium; San Diego, CA	CBSSN	L 30–34	32,133
September 28	5:00 p.m.	at New Mexico State*	Aggie Memorial Stadium; Las Cruces, NM	FSSD	W 26–16	16,113
October 4	6:00 p.m.	Nevada	Qualcomm Stadium; San Diego, CA	ESPN	W 51–44 ^{OT}	22,475
October 10	6:00 p.m.	at Air Force	Falcon Stadium; Colorado Springs, CO	CBSSN	W 27–20	17,280
October 26	7:30 p.m.	No. 15 Fresno State^{†}	Qualcomm Stadium; San Diego, CA (rivalry)	ESPN2	L 28–35 ^{OT}	32,707
November 2	5:00 p.m.	New Mexico	Qualcomm Stadium; San Diego, CA	RTRM, FSSD	W 35–30	35,890
November 9	7:30 p.m.	at San Jose State	Spartan Stadium; San Jose, CA	CBSSN	W 34–30	17,932
November 16	8:30 p.m.	at Hawaii	Aloha Stadium; Halawa, HI	CBSSN	W 28–21 ^{OT}	28,530
November 23	7:30 p.m.	Boise State	Qualcomm Stadium; San Diego, CA	CBSSN	W 34–31 ^{OT}	33,161
November 30	7:30 p.m.	at UNLV	Sam Boyd Stadium; Whitney, NV	ESPNU	L 19–45	15,884
December 21	2:30 p.m.	vs. Buffalo*	Bronco Stadium; Boise, ID (Famous Idaho Potato Bowl)	ESPN	W 49–24	21,951
*Non-conference game; ^{†}Homecoming; Rankings from AP Poll released prior to the game; All times are in Pacific time

== Game summaries ==
=== Eastern Illinois ===
Team	1	2	3	4	Total
• #21 (FCS) Panthers	7	12	7	14	40
Aztecs	13	3	3	0	19

- Date: August 31
- Location: Qualcomm Stadium
  San Diego, CA
- Game start: 5:00 p.m. PST
- Game attendance: 42,978

Scoring summary
1	12:57	SDSU	41-yard field goal by Wes Feer	SDSU 3–0
1	11:14	EIU	Erik Lora 37-yard touchdown reception from Jimmy Garoppolo, Cameron Berra kick good	EIU 7–3
1	9:11	SDSU	Colin Lockett 48-yard touchdown run, Feer kick good	SDSU 10–7
1	4:25	SDSU	35-yard field goal by Feer	SDSU 13–7
2	13:43	EIU	Lora 4-yard touchdown reception from Garoppolo, Berra kick no good	Tied 13–13
2	3:22	EIU	Keiondre Gober 62-yard touchdown reception from Garoppolo, Berra kick blocked	EIU 19–13
2	:16	SDSU	22-yard field goal by Feer	EIU 19–16
3	10:57	SDSU	38-yard field goal by Feer	Tied 19–19
3	7:36	EIU	Taylor Duncan 2-yard touchdown run, Berra kick good	EIU 26–19
4	13:43	EIU	Punt returned 60 yards for touchdown by Shephard Little, Berra kick good	EIU 33–19
4	4:30	EIU	Duncan 45-yard touchdown run, Berra kick good	EIU 40–19

=== @ Ohio State ===
	1	2	3	4	Total
Aztecs	0	0	7	0	7
#3 Buckeyes	21	14	7	0	42

=== Oregon State ===
	1	2	3	4	Total
Beavers	14	0	0	20	34
Aztecs	14	10	3	3	30

=== @ New Mexico State ===
	1	2	3	4	Total
Aztecs	0	5	6	15	26
Aggies	10	6	0	0	16

=== Nevada ===
	1	2	3	4	OT	Total
Wolf Pack	7	10	6	21	0	44
Aztecs	7	16	21	0	7	51

=== @ Air Force ===
	1	2	3	4	Total
Aztecs	6	0	0	21	27
Falcons	0	10	10	0	20

=== Fresno State ===
	1	2	3	4	OT	Total
#15 Bulldogs	7	0	7	14	7	35
Aztecs	0	7	7	14	0	28

=== New Mexico ===
	1	2	3	4	Total
Lobos	7	0	10	13	30
Aztecs	14	0	7	14	35

=== @ San Jose State ===
	1	2	3	4	Total
Aztecs	0	12	0	22	34
Spartans	10	10	3	7	30

=== @ Hawaii ===
	1	2	3	4	OT	Total
Aztecs	0	7	7	7	7	28
Rainbow Warriors	7	7	0	7	0	21

=== Boise State ===
	1	2	3	4	OT	Total
Broncos	7	0	14	7	3	31
Aztecs	7	7	0	14	6	34

=== @ UNLV ===
	1	2	3	4	Total
Aztecs	7	0	6	6	19
Rebels	7	17	7	14	45

=== vs Buffalo–Famous Idaho Potato Bowl ===
	1	2	3	4	Total
Bulls	0	10	0	14	24
Aztecs	7	21	14	7	49

Jeff Hilyer from the Sun Belt Conference was the referee.
