= 2013 UNLV Rebels football team =

American college football season

2013 UNLV Rebels football

Heart of Dallas Bowl, L 14–36 vs. North Texas
- Conference: Mountain West Conference
- West Division
- Record: 7–6 (5–3 MW)
- Head coach: Bobby Hauck (4th season)
- Offensive coordinator: Timm Rosenbach (1st season)
- Defensive coordinator: Tim Hauck (1st season)
- Home stadium: Sam Boyd Stadium

2013 Mountain West Conference football standings
	Conf.			Overall
Team	W		L	W		L
Mountain Division
Utah State x	7	–	1	9	–	5
Boise State	6	–	2	8	–	5
Colorado State	5	–	3	8	–	6
Wyoming	3	–	5	5	–	7
New Mexico	1	–	7	3	–	9
Air Force	0	–	8	2	–	10
West Division
Fresno State x$	7	–	1	11	–	2
San Diego State	6	–	2	8	–	5
UNLV	5	–	3	7	–	6
San Jose State	5	–	3	6	–	6
Nevada	3	–	5	4	–	8
Hawaii	0	–	8	1	–	11
Championship: Fresno State 24, Utah State 17
$ – Conference champion; x – Division champion/co-champions; Rankings from AP Poll

The 2013 UNLV Rebels football team represented the University of Nevada, Las Vegas (UNLV) as a member of the Mountain West Conference (MW) during the 2013 NCAA Division I FBS football season. Led by fourth-year head coach Bobby Hauck, the Rebels compiled an overall record of 7–6 record with mark of 5–3 in conference play, tying for third place the MW's West Division. UNLV was invited to the Heart of Dallas Bowl, where the Rebels lost to North Texas. The team played home games at Sam Boyd Stadium in Whitney, Nevada.

This was the first season since 2000 and last until 2023 in which UNLV went to a bowl game.

== Schedule ==
Date	Time	Opponent	Site	TV	Result	Attendance
August 29	4:00 p.m.	at Minnesota*	TCF Bank Stadium; Minneapolis, MN	BTN	L 23–51	44,217
September 7	7:30 p.m.	Arizona*	Sam Boyd Stadium; Whitney, NV	CBSSN	L 13–58	26,950
September 14	7:00 p.m.	Central Michigan*	Sam Boyd Stadium; Whitney, NV	MWN	W 31–21	10,981
September 21	6:00 p.m.	Western Illinois*	Sam Boyd Stadium; Whitney, NV		W 38–7	13,017
September 28	5:00 p.m.	at New Mexico	University Stadium; Albuquerque, NM		W 56–42	23,639
October 12	5:00 p.m.	Hawaii	Sam Boyd Stadium; Whitney, NV	Oceanic PPV	W 39–37	22,755
October 19	7:00 p.m.	at No. 19 Fresno State	Bulldog Stadium; Fresno, CA	MWN	L 14–38	37,604
October 26	3:05 p.m.	at Nevada	Mackay Stadium; Reno, NV (Fremont Cannon)	ESPN3	W 27–22	32,521
November 2	1:00 p.m.	San Jose State^{†}	Sam Boyd Stadium; Whitney, NV	MWN	L 24–34	15,837
November 9	5:00 p.m.	Utah State	Sam Boyd Stadium; Whitney, NV	ESPNU	L 24–28	15,062
November 21	6:30 p.m.	at Air Force	Falcon Stadium; Colorado Springs, CO	ESPNU	W 41–21	29,898
November 30	7:30 p.m.	San Diego State	Sam Boyd Stadium; Whitney, NV	ESPNU	W 45–19	15,884
January 1	9:00 a.m.	at North Texas*	Cotton Bowl; Dallas, TX (Heart of Dallas Bowl)	ESPNU	L 14–36	38,380
*Non-conference game; ^{†}Homecoming; Rankings from AP Poll released prior to the game; All times are in Pacific time

== Game summaries ==
=== At Minnesota ===
UNLV at Minnesota

Team	1	2	3	4	Total
Rebels	6	7	3	7	23
• Golden Gophers	3	13	14	21	51

- Date: August 29
- Location: TCF Bank Stadium
  Minneapolis, MN
- Game start: 4:00 p.m. PDT
- Elapsed time: 3:20
- Game attendance: 44,217
- Game weather: Temperature: 92 • Wind: S 14 • Weather: Partly Cloudy, Hot
- Referee: Rick Loumiet
- Television network: BTN

In their first game of the season, the Rebels lost, 51–23 to the Minnesota Golden Gophers.

Scoring summary

Quarter	Time	Drive			Team	Scoring information	Score	
Quarter	Time	Plays	Yards	TOP	Team	Scoring information	UNLV	Minnesota
1	9:48	13	75	5:12	UNLV	Tim Cornett 26-yard touchdown run, Nolan Kohorst kick blocked	6	0
1	2:39	9	32	4:11	Minnesota	25-yard field goal by Chris Hawthorne	6	3
2	13:45	2	69	0:31	Minnesota	Philip Nelson 48-yard touchdown run, Chris Hawthorne kick good	6	10
2	5:04	11	66	3:28	UNLV	Devante Davis 34-yard touchdown reception from Nick Sherry, Nolan Kohorst kick good	13	10
2	0:18	10	39	1:27	Minnesota	Maxx Williams 10-yard touchdown reception from Philip Nelson, Chris Hawthorne kick failed	13	16
3	14:48	1	98		Minnesota	Marcus Jones 98-yard kickoff return, Chris Hawthorne kick good	13	23
3	7:36	1	51		Minnesota	Martez Shabazz 51-yard blocked field goal return, Chris Hawthorne kick good	13	30
3	3:52	10	66	3:44	UNLV	32-yard field goal by Nolan Kohorst	16	30
4	10:41				Minnesota	Interception returned 89 yards for touchdown by Briean Boddy-Calhoun, Chris Hawthorne kick good	16	37
4	6:37	8	37	3:47	Minnesota	Philip Nelson 5-yard touchdown run, Chris Hawthorne kick good	16	44
4	4:12	6	75	2:25	UNLV	Taylor Barnhill 1-yard touchdown reception from Nick Sherry, Nolan Kohorst kick good	23	44
4	0:42	6	86	3:30	Minnesota	Mitch Leidner 4-yard touchdown run, Chris Hawthorne kick good	23	51
"TOP" = time of possession. For other American football terms, see Glossary of American football.							23	51

=== Arizona ===
Arizona at UNLV

Team	1	2	3	4	Total
• Wildcats	17	28	3	10	58
Rebels	0	6	0	7	13

- Date: September 7
- Location: Sam Boyd Stadium
  Whitney, NV
- Game start: 7:30 p.m. PDT
- Elapsed time: 3:30
- Game attendance: 26,950
- Game weather: Temperature: 87 • Wind: 7mph SSE • Weather: Mostly Cloudy
- Referee: Terry Leyden
- Television network: CBSSN

In their second game of the season, the Rebels lost, 58–13 to the Arizona Wildcats.

Scoring summary

Quarter	Time	Drive			Team	Scoring information	Score	
Quarter	Time	Plays	Yards	TOP	Team	Scoring information	Arizona	UNLV
1	11:33	9	41	2:41	Arizona	41-yard field goal by Jake Smith	3	0
1	8:10	8	85	2:22	Arizona	B.J. Denker 35-yard touchdown run, Jake Smith kick good	10	0
1	3:25	2	9	0:35	Arizona	B.J. Denker 5-yard touchdown run, Jake Smith kick good	17	0
2	14:49	4	80	0:57	UNLV	Devante Davis 69-yard touchdown reception from Nick Sherry, Nolan Kohorst kick failed	17	6
2	14:28	1	58	0:12	Arizona	Ka'Deem Carey 58-yard touchdown run, Jake Smith kick good	24	6
2	8:37	11	63	4:03	Arizona	Ka'Deem Carey 12-yard touchdown run, Jake Smith kick good	31	6
2	6:59				Arizona	Interception returned 49 yards for touchdown by Jake Fischer, Jake Smith kick good	38	6
2	1:34				Arizona	Interception returned 52 yards for touchdown by Tra'Mayne Bondurant, Jake Smith kick good	45	6
3	9:54	14	63	5:06	Arizona	29-yard field goal by Jake Smith	48	6
4	9:00	12	41	5:55	Arizona	30-yard field goal by Jake Smith	51	6
4	8:21	2	79	0:23	UNLV	Shaquille Murray-Lawrence 79-yard touchdown run, Nolan Kohorst kick good	51	13
4	2:50	11	84	5:26	Arizona	Kylan Butler 3-yard touchdown run, Jake Smith kick good	58	13
"TOP" = time of possession. For other American football terms, see Glossary of American football.							58	13

=== Central Michigan ===
Central Michigan at UNLV

Team	1	2	3	4	Total
Chippewas	7	14	0	0	21
• Rebels	0	7	14	10	31

- Date: September 14
- Location: Sam Boyd Stadium
  Whitney, NV
- Game start: 7:00 p.m. PDT
- Elapsed time: 3:02
- Game attendance: 10,981
- Game weather: Temperature: 90 F • Wind: 6mph S • Weather: Partly Cloudy
- Referee: Scott Novak
- Television network: MWN

In their third game of the season, the Rebels won, 31–21 over the Central Michigan Chippewas.

Scoring summary

Quarter	Time	Drive			Team	Scoring information	Score	
Quarter	Time	Plays	Yards	TOP	Team	Scoring information	Central Michigan	UNLV
1	4:23	11	68	4:42	Central Michigan	Saylor Lavallii 3-yard touchdown run, Ron Coluzzi kick good	7	0
2	12:15	11	76	5:25	Central Michigan	Saylor Lavallii 3-yard touchdown run, Ron Coluzzi kick good	14	0
2	7:02	5	51	2:15	Central Michigan	Titus Davis 20-yard touchdown reception from Cooper Rush, Ron Coluzzi kick good	21	0
2	0:54	5	76	1:19	UNLV	Devante Davis 12-yard touchdown reception from Caleb Herring, Nolan Kohorst kick good	21	7
3	10:10	12	80	4:45	UNLV	Tim Cornett 12-yard touchdown run, Nolan Kohorst kick good	21	14
3	2:58	4	60	1:09	UNLV	Devante Davis 42-yard touchdown reception from Caleb Herring, Nolan Kohorst kick good	21	21
4	13:41	9	54	2:54	UNLV	34-yard field goal by Nolan Kohorst	21	24
4	6:40	13	94	4:36	UNLV	Devante Davis 12-yard touchdown reception from Caleb Herring, Nolan Kohorst kick good	21	31
"TOP" = time of possession. For other American football terms, see Glossary of American football.							21	31

=== Western Illinois ===
Western Illinois at UNLV

Team	1	2	3	4	Total
Leathernecks	0	0	7	0	7
• Rebels	10	7	14	7	38

- Date: September 21
- Location: Sam Boyd Stadium
  Whitney, NV
- Game start: 6:00 p.m. PDT
- Elapsed time: 2:59
- Game attendance: 13,017
- Game weather: Temperature: 89 • Wind: 22mph SW • Weather: Clear
- Referee: David Alvarez

In their fourth game of the season, the Rebels won, 38–7 over the Western Illinois Leathernecks.

Scoring summary

Quarter	Time	Drive			Team	Scoring information	Score	
Quarter	Time	Plays	Yards	TOP	Team	Scoring information	Western Illinois	UNLV
1	8:08	5	46	1:12	UNLV	Tim Cornett 3-yard touchdown run, Nolan Kohorst kick good	0	7
1	0:01	10	54	3:43	UNLV	43-yard field goal by Nolan Kohorst	0	10
2	5:30	8	66	3:11	UNLV	Jake Phillips 27-yard touchdown reception from Caleb Herring, Nolan Kohorst kick good	0	17
3	11:47	8	75	3:13	UNLV	Tim Cornett 42-yard touchdown run, Nolan Kohorst kick good	0	24
3	10:26	2	27	0:27	UNLV	Adonis Smith 4-yard touchdown run, Nolan Kohorst kick good	0	31
3	2:15	5	61	2:20	Western Illinois	Joey Borsellino 11-yard touchdown reception from Trenton Norvell, Nathan Knuffman kick good	7	31
4	11:54	5	58	1:49	UNLV	Adonis Smith 16-yard touchdown run, Nolan Kohorst kick good	7	38
"TOP" = time of possession. For other American football terms, see Glossary of American football.							7	38

=== At New Mexico ===
UNLV at New Mexico

Team	1	2	3	4	Total
• Rebels	14	21	7	14	56
Lobos	21	14	7	0	42

- Date: September 28
- Location: University Stadium
  Albuquerque, NM
- Game start: 5:00 p.m. PDT
- Elapsed time: 3:13
- Game attendance: 23,639
- Game weather: Temperature: 67 • Wind: NNW @3 • Weather: Sunny
- Referee: Eddie Shelton

In their fifth game of the season, the Rebels won, 56–42 over the New Mexico Lobos.

Scoring summary

Quarter	Time	Drive			Team	Scoring information	Score	
Quarter	Time	Plays	Yards	TOP	Team	Scoring information	UNLV	New Mexico
1	12:04	7	75	2:56	New Mexico	Kasey Carrier 22-yard touchdown run, Justus Adams kick good	0	7
1	8:46	5	80	2:23	New Mexico	Carlos Wiggins 62-yard touchdown run, Justus Adams kick good	0	14
1	8:31	1	69	0:10	UNLV	Marcus Sullivan 69-yard touchdown run, Nolan Kohorst kick good	7	14
1	6:11	3	34	0:53	UNLV	Tim Cornett 4-yard touchdown run, Nolan Kohorst kick good	14	14
1	3:02	6	69	3:04	New Mexico	Carlos Wiggins 10-yard touchdown run, Justus Adams kick good	14	21
2	14:56	10	71	3:00	UNLV	Taylor Barnhill 4-yard touchdown reception from Caleb Herring, Nolan Kohorst kick good	21	21
2	14:11	3	75	0:45	New Mexico	Cole Gautsche 7-yard touchdown run, Justus Adams kick good	21	28
2	12:34	4	66	1:33	UNLV	Devante Davis 47-yard touchdown reception from Caleb Herring, Nolan Kohorst kick good	28	28
2	4:36	15	79	7:54	New Mexico	Cole Gautsche 4-yard touchdown run, Justus Adams kick good	28	35
2	1:48	7	81	2:38	UNLV	Tim Cornett 9-yard touchdown run, Nolan Kohorst kick good	35	35
3	9:23	13	75	5:37	UNLV	Devante Davis 11-yard touchdown reception from Caleb Herring, Nolan Kohorst kick good	42	35
3	2:27	7	67	3:30	New Mexico	Carlos Wiggins 43-yard touchdown reception from Cole Gautsche, Justus Adams kick good	42	42
4	4:46	15	80	6:49	UNLV	Devante Davis 7-yard touchdown reception from Caleb Herring, Nolan Kohorst kick good	49	42
4	3:03	1	75	0:12	UNLV	Tim Cornett 75-yard touchdown run, Nolan Kohorst kick good	56	42
"TOP" = time of possession. For other American football terms, see Glossary of American football.							56	42

=== Hawaii ===
Hawaii at UNLV

Team	1	2	3	4	Total
Rainbow Warriors	0	17	0	20	37
• Rebels	0	13	17	9	39

- Date: October 12
- Location: Sam Boyd Stadium
  Whitney, NV
- Game start: 5:00 p.m. PDT
- Elapsed time: 3:50
- Game attendance: 22,755
- Game weather: Temperature: 75 • Wind: 7mph SE • Weather: Sunny
- Referee: Kevin Mar
- Television network: Oceanic PPV

In their sixth game of the season, the Rebels won, 39–37 over the Hawaii Rainbow Warriors.

Scoring summary

Quarter	Time	Drive			Team	Scoring information	Score	
Quarter	Time	Plays	Yards	TOP	Team	Scoring information	Hawaii	UNLV
2	12:46	11	48	3:39	Hawaii	31-yard field goal by Tyler Hadden	3	0
2	9:22	11	57	3:24	UNLV	35-yard field goal by Nolan Kohorst	3	3
2	4:02	10	77	3:43	UNLV	19-yard field goal by Nolan Kohorst	3	6
2	2:26	4	57	1:29	Hawaii	Donnie King 12-yard touchdown reception from Sean Schroeder, Tyler Hadden kick good	10	6
2	1:35	4	53	0:43	UNLV	Tim Cornett 1-yard touchdown run, Nolan Kohorst kick good	10	13
2	0:32	5	56	0:59	Hawaii	Chris Gant 28-yard touchdown reception from Sean Schroeder, Tyler Hadden kick good	17	13
3	12:04	10	75	2:56	UNLV	Anthony Williams 10-yard touchdown reception from Caleb Herring, Nolan Kohorst kick good	17	20
3	8:13	10	40	2:58	UNLV	41-yard field goal by Nolan Kohorst	17	23
3	1:56	9	65	3:44	UNLV	Tim Cornett 5-yard touchdown run, Nolan Kohorst kick good	17	30
4	13:11	2	8	0:26	UNLV	Caleb Herring 8-yard touchdown run, 2-point pass failed	17	36
4	8:11	9	72	1:53	Hawaii	Steve Lakalaka 15-yard touchdown run, 2-point pass failed	23	36
4	5:54	1	48	0:08	Hawaii	Bill Stutzmann 48-yard touchdown reception from Sean Schroeder, Tyler Hadden kick good	30	36
4	1:44	4	55	0:38	Hawaii	Chris Gant 44-yard touchdown reception from Sean Schroeder, Tyler Hadden kick good	37	36
4	0:00	12	51	1:39	UNLV	44-yard field goal by Nolan Kohorst	37	39
"TOP" = time of possession. For other American football terms, see Glossary of American football.							37	39

=== At Fresno State ===
UNLV at Fresno State

Team	1	2	3	4	Total
Rebels	0	14	0	0	14
• #19 Bulldogs	14	14	10	0	38

- Date: October 19
- Location: Bulldog Stadium
  Fresno, CA
- Game start: 7:00 p.m. PDT
- Elapsed time: 3:03
- Game attendance: 37,604
- Game weather: Temperature: 77 • Wind: WNW-5mph • Weather: Fair
- Referee: Eddy Shelton
- Television network: MWN

In their seventh game of the season, the Rebels lost, 38–14 to the Fresno State Bulldogs.

Scoring summary

Quarter	Time	Drive			Team	Scoring information	Score	
Quarter	Time	Plays	Yards	TOP	Team	Scoring information	UNLV	Fresno State
1	14:51	1	75	0:09	Fresno State	Davante Adams 75-yard touchdown reception from Derek Carr, Colin McGuire kick good	0	7
1	4:42	14	79	5:31	Fresno State	Davante Adams 28-yard touchdown reception from Derek Carr, Colin McGuire kick good	0	14
2	12:44	14	72	4:29	Fresno State	Josh Quezada 2-yard touchdown run, Colin McGuire kick good	0	21
2	12:06	2	82	0:34	UNLV	Shaquille Murray-Lawrence 73-yard touchdown run, Nolan Kohorst kick good	7	21
2	10:20	6	68	1:36	Fresno State	Davante Adams 36-yard touchdown reception from Derek Carr, Colin McGuire kick good	7	28
2	1:07	9	60	2:26	UNLV	Marcus Sullivan 13-yard touchdown reception from Caleb Herring, Nolan Kohorst kick good	14	28
3	9:57	11	84	3:59	Fresno State	Davante Adams 37-yard touchdown reception from Derek Carr, Colin McGuire kick good	14	35
3	3:00	9	43	3:47	Fresno State	36-yard field goal by Colin McGuire	14	38
"TOP" = time of possession. For other American football terms, see Glossary of American football.							14	38

=== At Nevada ===
UNLV at Nevada

Team	1	2	3	4	Total
• Rebels	0	14	0	13	27
Wolf Pack	3	13	0	6	22

- Date: October 26
- Location: Mackay Stadium
  Reno, NV
- Game start: 3:05 p.m. PDT
- Elapsed time: 3:31
- Game attendance: 32,521
- Game weather: Temperature: 72 • Wind: Calm • Weather: Sunny and Clear
- Referee: Jim Farmer
- Television network: ESPN Networks

In their eighth game of the season, the Rebels won, 27–22 over the Nevada Wolf Pack.

Scoring summary

Quarter	Time	Drive			Team	Scoring information	Score	
Quarter	Time	Plays	Yards	TOP	Team	Scoring information	UNLV	Nevada
1	7:09	6	57	2:14	Nevada	40-yard field goal by Brent Zuzo	0	3
2	12:55	14	63	4:36	Nevada	22-yard field goal by Brent Zuzo	0	6
2	9:56	9	75	2:59	UNLV	Maika Mataele 16-yard touchdown reception from Caleb Herring, Nolan Kohorst kick good	7	6
2	5:52	4	71	1:38	Nevada	Richy Turner 61-yard touchdown reception from Cody Fajardo, Brent Zuzo kick good	7	13
2	4:18	5	75	1:34	UNLV	Devante Davis 44-yard touchdown reception from Caleb Herring, Nolan Kohorst kick good	14	13
2	0:24	7	39	1:06	Nevada	43-yard field goal by Brent Zuzo	14	16
4	11:46	3	27	0:40	UNLV	Tim Cornett 9-yard touchdown run, Nolan Kohorst kick good	21	16
4	5:54	10	80	4:42	UNLV	Devante Davis 11-yard touchdown reception from Caleb Herring, 2-point pass failed	27	16
4	3:25	8	72	2:22	Nevada	Aaron Bradley 9-yard touchdown reception from Cody Fajardo, 2-point pass failed	27	22
"TOP" = time of possession. For other American football terms, see Glossary of American football.							27	22

=== San Jose State ===
San Jose State at UNLV

Team	1	2	3	4	Total
• Spartans	14	10	0	10	34
Rebels	0	3	14	7	24

- Date: November 2
- Location: Sam Boyd Stadium
  Whitney, NV
- Game start: 1:00 p.m. PDT
- Elapsed time: 3:09
- Game attendance: 15,837
- Game weather: Temperature: 71 • Wind: SE 2MPH • Weather: Sunny
- Referee: Scott Novak
- Television network: MWN

In their ninth game of the season, the Rebels lost, 34–24 to the San Jose State Spartans.

Scoring summary

Quarter	Time	Drive			Team	Scoring information	Score	
Quarter	Time	Plays	Yards	TOP	Team	Scoring information	San Jose State	UNLV
1	9:17	13	82	5:43	San Jose State	Chandler Jones 13-yard touchdown reception from David Fales, Austin Lopez kick good	7	0
1	4:21	6	53	2:26	San Jose State	Kyle Nunn 30-yard touchdown reception from Billy Freeman, Austin Lopez kick good	14	0
2	13:10	7	16	2:17	UNLV	20-yard field goal by Nolan Kohorst	14	3
2	4:29	3	74	1:08	San Jose State	Jarrod Lawson 31-yard touchdown run, Austin Lopez kick good	21	3
2	0:20	10	78	3:29	San Jose State	20-yard field goal by Austin Lopez	24	3
3	12:35	7	78	2:20	UNLV	Marcus Sullivan 19-yard touchdown reception from Caleb Herring, Nolan Kohorst kick good	24	10
3	0:17	9	57	3:32	UNLV	Caleb Herring 1-yard touchdown run, Nolan Kohorst kick good	24	17
4	10:49	6	56	2:10	San Jose State	Thomas Tucker 37-yard touchdown run, Austin Lopez kick good	31	17
4	8:00	9	75	2:49	UNLV	Maika Mataele 16-yard touchdown reception from Caleb Herring, Nolan Kohorst kick good	31	24
4	2:56	9	48	5:04	San Jose State	44-yard field goal by Austin Lopez	34	24
"TOP" = time of possession. For other American football terms, see Glossary of American football.							34	24

=== Utah State ===
Utah State at UNLV

Team	1	2	3	4	Total
• Aggies	0	14	7	7	28
Rebels	7	10	0	7	24

- Date: November 9
- Location: Sam Boyd Stadium
  Whitney, NV
- Game start: 5:00 p.m. PST
- Elapsed time: 3:36
- Game attendance: 15,062
- Game weather: Temperature: 69 • Wind: 3 MPH E • Weather: Partly Cloudy
- Referee: Daniel Romero
- Television network: ESPNU

In their tenth game of the season, the Rebels lost, 28–24 to the Utah State Aggies.

Scoring summary

Quarter	Time	Drive			Team	Scoring information	Score	
Quarter	Time	Plays	Yards	TOP	Team	Scoring information	Utah State	UNLV
1	8:23	9	58	4:36	UNLV	Marcus Sullivan 10-yard touchdown reception from Caleb Herring, Nolan Kohorst kick good	0	7
2	14:53	13	52	5:12	Utah State	Shaan Johnson 5-yard touchdown reception from Dare Garretson, Nick Diaz kick good	7	7
2	13:10	4	8	1:31	UNLV	29-yard field goal by Nolan Kohorst	7	10
2	11:16	5	67	1:48	Utah State	Bruce Natson 13-yard touchdown run, Nick Diaz kick good	14	10
2	3:10	6	66	2:44	UNLV	Tim Cornett 4-yard touchdown run, Nolan Kohorst kick good	14	17
3	3:09	7	88	2:24	Utah State	Joey Demartino 1-yard touchdown run, Nick Diaz kick good	21	17
4	10:53	15	79	7:10	UNLV	Maika Mataele 4-yard touchdown reception from Caleb Herring, Nolan Kohorst kick good	21	24
4	3:56	11	82	3:52	Utah State	Bruce Natson 12-yard touchdown run, Nick Diaz kick good	28	24
"TOP" = time of possession. For other American football terms, see Glossary of American football.							28	24

=== At Air Force ===
UNLV at Air Force

Team	1	2	3	4	Total
• Rebels	20	13	0	8	41
Falcons	0	14	7	0	21

- Date: November 21
- Location: Falcon Stadium
  Colorado Springs, CO
- Game start: 6:30 p.m. PST
- Elapsed time: 3:18
- Game attendance: 29,898
- Game weather: Temperature: 10 • Wind: 17 MPH N • Weather: Cold, wind chill −7
- Referee: Dan Romeo
- Television network: ESPNU

In their eleventh game of the season, the Rebels won, 41–21 over the Air Force Falcons to become bowl eligible for the first time since the year 2000.

Scoring summary

Quarter	Time	Drive			Team	Scoring information	Score	
Quarter	Time	Plays	Yards	TOP	Team	Scoring information	UNLV	Air Force
1	11:56	2	30	0:35	UNLV	Tim Cornett 22-yard touchdown run, Nolan Kohorst kick blocked	6	0
1	4:29	5	53	1:50	UNLV	Caleb Herring 1-yard touchdown run, Nolan Kohorst kick good	13	0
1	1:47	4	48	1:23	UNLV	Caleb Herring 6-yard touchdown run, Nolan Kohorst kick good	20	0
2	9:47	13	63	5:34	UNLV	Tim Cornett 7-yard touchdown run, Nolan Kohorst kick good	27	0
2	8:59	3	47	0:47	Air Force	Alex Ludowig 31-yard touchdown reception from Nate Romine, Will Conant kick good	27	7
2	3:47	11	76	5:07	UNLV	Tim Cornett 3-yard touchdown run, Nolan Kohorst kick blocked	33	7
2	0:08	11	66	3:33	Air Force	Broam Hart 1-yard touchdown run, Will Conant kick good	33	14
3	5:18	10	80	3:41	Air Force	D.J. Johnson 1-yard touchdown run, Will Conant kick good	33	21
4	2:03	1	46	0:09	UNLV	Tim Cornett 46-yard touchdown run, 2-point pass good	41	21
"TOP" = time of possession. For other American football terms, see Glossary of American football.							41	21

=== San Diego State ===
San Diego State at UNLV

Team	1	2	3	4	Total
Aztecs	7	0	6	6	19
• Rebels	7	17	7	14	45

- Date: November 30
- Location: Sam Boyd Stadium
  Whitney, NV
- Game start: 7:36 PST
- Elapsed time: 3:25
- Game attendance: 15,884
- Game weather: Temperature: 50 • Wind: 5 MPH NNE • Weather: Clear
- Referee: Rick Loumiet
- Television network: ESPNU

In their twelfth game of the season, the Rebels won, 45–19 over the San Diego State Aztecs.

Scoring summary

Quarter	Time	Drive			Team	Scoring information	Score	
Quarter	Time	Plays	Yards	TOP	Team	Scoring information	SDSU	UNLV
1	14:19	2	69	0:41	SDSU	Colin Lockett 39-yard touchdown reception from Quinn Kaehler, Wes Feer kick good	7	0
1	11:04	8	65	3:15	UNLV	Devante Davis 5-yard touchdown reception from Caleb Herring, Nolan Kohorst kick good	7	7
2	11:04	6	78	2:24	UNLV	Devante Davis 10-yard touchdown reception from Caleb Herring, Nolan Kohorst kick good	7	14
2	5:30	6	86	2:20	UNLV	Devante Davis 63-yard touchdown reception from Caleb Herring, Nolan Kohorst kick good	7	21
2	1:09	6	14	1:56	UNLV	50-yard field goal by Nolan Kohorst	7	24
3	11:36	7	67	3:01	UNLV	Caleb Herring 5-yard touchdown run, Nolan Kohorst kick good	7	31
3	2:27	11	59	4:08	SDSU	Donne Pumphrey 1-yard touchdown run, Wes Feer kick no good	13	31
4	14:43	6	48	2:34	UNLV	Marcus Sullivan 32-yard touchdown reception from Caleb Herring, Nolan Kohorst kick good	13	38
4	11:27	4	22	1:13	UNLV	Devante Davis 6-yard touchdown reception from Caleb Herring, Nolan Kohorst kick good	13	45
4	7:17	1	71		SDSU	Tim Vizzi 71-yard punt return, Quinn Kaehler 2-pt rush failed	19	45
"TOP" = time of possession. For other American football terms, see Glossary of American football.							19	45

=== Vs. North Texas (Heart of Dallas Bowl) ===
UNLV vs. North Texas

Team	1	2	3	4	Total
Rebels	7	0	0	7	14
• Mean Green	7	0	7	22	36

- Date: January 1
- Location: Cotton Bowl
  Dallas, TX
- Game start: 9:00 a.m. PST
- Game attendance: 38,380
- Referee: Ron Snodgrass
- TV announcers (ESPNU): Clay Matvick, Matt Stinchcomb, and Dawn Davenport

In their thirteenth game of the season, the Rebels lost, 36–14 to the North Texas Mean Green in the 2014 Heart of Dallas Bowl in Dallas, Texas.

Scoring summary

Quarter	Time	Drive			Team	Scoring information	Score	
Quarter	Time	Plays	Yards	TOP	Team	Scoring information	UNLV	North Texas
1	7:31	8	95	3:00	UNLV	Marcus Sullivan 9-yard touchdown reception from Caleb Herring, Nolan Kohorst kick good	7	0
1	1:47	8	42	3:55	North Texas	Antoinne Jimmerson 1-yard touchdown run, Zach Paul kick good	7	7
3	6:07	12	60	5:11	North Texas	Drew Miller 7-yard touchdown reception from Derek Thompson, Zach Paul kick good	7	14
4	14:56	12	74	4:44	North Texas	Brelan Chancellor 3-yard touchdown run, Zach Paul kick good	7	21
4	6:59	10	75	5:31	North Texas	Darnell Smith 34-yard touchdown reception from Derek Thompson, Zach Paul kick good	7	28
4	4:56	7	50	1:54	UNLV	Jerry Rice, Jr. 13-yard touchdown reception from Caleb Herring, Nolan Kohorst kick good	14	28
4	2:24	3	16	1:39	North Texas	Brelan Chancellor 15-yard touchdown run, 2-point run blocked PAT taken in by Drew Miller	14	36
"TOP" = time of possession. For other American football terms, see Glossary of American football.							14	36

== Weekly starters ==
The following players were the weekly offensive and defensive game starters.

Opponent	LT	LG	C	RG	RT	TE	QB	RB	WR	WR	WR
Minnesota	Boyko	Jefferson	Waterman	Gstrein	Oberg	Phillips	Sherry	Cornett	Davis	Williams	Mataele
Arizona	Boyko	Jefferson	Waterman	Gstrein	Oberg	Phillips	Sherry	Cornett	Davis	Williams	Criswell
Central Michigan	Boyko	Jefferson	Waterman	Gstrein	Oberg	Phillips	Sherry	Cornett	Davis	Mataele	Criswell
Western Illinois	Boyko	Jefferson	Waterman	Gstrein	Oberg	Phillips	Herring	Cornett	Davis	Williams	Barnhill
New Mexico	Boyko	Jefferson	Waterman	Scoggins	Oberg	Phillips	Herring	Cornett	Davis	Williams	Barnhill
Hawaii	Boyko	Jefferson	Waterman	Scoggins	Oberg	Sullivan	Herring	Cornett	Davis	Williams	Mataele
Fresno State	Boyko	Jefferson	Waterman	Scoggins	Oberg	Sullivan	Herring	Cornett	Davis	Williams	Mataele
Nevada	Boyko	Jefferson	Waterman	Scoggins	Oberg	Price	Herring	Cornett	Davis	Sullivan	Mataele
San Jose State	Boyko	Jefferson	Waterman	Scoggins	Oberg	Barnhill	Herring	Cornett	Davis	Sullivan	Mataele
Utah State	Boyko	Jefferson	Waterman	Scoggins	Oberg	Barnhill	Herring	Cornett	Davis	Sullivan	Mataele
Air Force	Boyko	Jefferson	Waterman	Scoggins	Oberg	Price	Herring	Cornett	Davis	Sullivan	Mataele
San Diego State	Boyko	Jefferson	Waterman	Scoggins	Oberg	Phillips	Herring	Cornett	Davis	Sullivan	Barnhill
Opponent	DE	DT	DT	DE	LB	LB	LB	CB	CB	SS	FS
Minnesota	Sanitoa	Klorman	Garrick	Sparkman	Lotulelei	Maka	Hasson, Ti	Hasson, Ta	Hodge	Vea	Crawford
Arizona	Sanitoa	Gaston	Garrick	Sparkman	Horsey	Maka	Hasson, Ti	Hasson, Ta	Hodge	Vea	Crawford
Central Michigan	Sanitoa	Gaston	Garrick	Sparkman	Lotulelei	Maka	Hasson, Ti	Hasson, Ta	Penny	Vea	Crawford
Western Illinois	Sanitoa	Gaston	Garrick	Sparkman	Ehlert	Maka	Hasson, Ti	Hasson, Ta	Penny	Vea	Crawford
New Mexico	Sanitoa	Gaston	Garrick	Sparkman	Lotulelei	Maka	Hasson, Ti	Hasson, Ta	Penny	Vea	Crawford
Hawaii	Sanitoa	Gaston	Garrick	Sparkman	Ehlert	Maka	Hasson, Ti	Hasson, Ta	Penny	Vea	Crawford
Fresno State	Sanitoa	Gaston	Garrick	Sparkman	Horsey	Maka	Hasson, Ti	Hasson, Ta	Penny	Vea	Crawford
Nevada	Sanitoa	Gaston	Garrick	Sparkman	Ehlert	Maka	Hasson, Ti	Hasson, Ta	Penny	Vea	Crawford
San Jose State	Sanitoa	Gaston	Garrick	Sparkman	Horsey	Maka	Hasson, Ti	Hasson, Ta	Penny	Vea	Crawford
Utah State	Sanitoa	Gaston	Garrick	Valoaga	Ehlert	Maka	Hasson, Ti	Hasson, Ta	Penny	Vea	Crawford
Air Force	Sanitoa	Gaston	Garrick	Sparkman	Ehlert	Maka	Hasson, Ti	Hasson, Ta	Penny	Vea	Horsey
San Diego State	Sanitoa	Gaston	Garrick	Sparkman	Lotulelei	Maka	Hasson, Ti	Hasson, Ta	Penny	Vea	Horsey
– started as third cornerback, – started as fullback, – started as fourth WR
