= 2013 Mountain West Conference Football Championship Game =

- Conference Championship
Utah State Aggies	Fresno State Bulldogs
(8–4)	(10–1)
17	24
Head coach: Matt Wells	Head coach: Tim DeRuyter
	AP / Coaches / BCS; 24 / 22 / 23
	1	2	3	4	Total
Utah State	0	7	0	10	17
Fresno State	3	14	7	0	24
- Date: December 7, 2013
- Season: 2013
- Stadium: Bulldog Stadium
- Location: Fresno, CA
- MVP: QB Derek Carr (Fresno State)
- Favorite: Fresno State by 2.5
- Referee: Reggie Smith
- Attendance: 31,362

United States TV coverage
- Network: CBS; Mountain West Radio Network
- Announcers: Andrew Catalon (play-by-play), Aaron Taylor (color) & Allie LaForce (sideline)- CBS Nate Kreckman (play-by-play) & Mike Pritchard (color)- Mountain West Radio Network

2013 Mountain West Conference football standings
	Conf.			Overall
Team	W		L	W		L
Mountain Division
Utah State x	7	–	1	9	–	5
Boise State	6	–	2	8	–	5
Colorado State	5	–	3	8	–	6
Wyoming	3	–	5	5	–	7
New Mexico	1	–	7	3	–	9
Air Force	0	–	8	2	–	10
West Division
Fresno State x$	7	–	1	11	–	2
San Diego State	6	–	2	8	–	5
UNLV	5	–	3	7	–	6
San Jose State	5	–	3	6	–	6
Nevada	3	–	5	4	–	8
Hawaii	0	–	8	1	–	11
Championship: Fresno State 24, Utah State 17
$ – Conference champion; x – Division champion/co-champions; Rankings from AP Poll

The 2013 Mountain West Conference Football Championship Game determined the 2013 football champion of the Mountain West Conference (MW). The game, played at Bulldog Stadium on the campus of California State University, Fresno (Fresno State), was the first football conference championship game for the Mountain West Conference. The game featured the West Division champions Fresno State Bulldogs hosting the Mountain Division champions Utah State Aggies.

Fresno State won 24–17 and represented the Mountain West in the 2013 Las Vegas Bowl on December 21 in Las Vegas, Nevada after defeating Utah State by 7 points.

== History ==
After the 2013 Mountain West Conference realignment, the league added two new members, San Jose State and Utah State for the 2013 season. By adding two new members for a total of 12 football members (11 all-sports members and football-only Hawaii), the MW was able to split into two divisions, the Mountain and the West, and to organize an annual conference championship game.

== Teams ==
=== Mountain Division Champions ===
Utah State comes into the championship with a non–conference record of 1–3 after losing to former Mountain West member Utah, USC and BYU, while beating Weber State. Utah State was first in the Mountain Division standings with a conference record of 2–0 until losing to Boise State. Utah State then fell to third behind Wyoming and Boise State. Wyoming then lost to Colorado State which moved Boise State to first and Utah State to second in the standings. Boise State then lost a close game in overtime against San Diego State, which moved Utah State back at first in the division. By the end of the regular season, Utah State stayed undefeated after the loss to Boise State bringing the Aggies to their first division championship.

This was Utah State's first appearance in Mountain West Conference Championship series.

=== West Division Champions ===
Fresno State comes into the championship undefeated in non–conference games against Rutgers, Cal-Poly San Luis Obispo, and Idaho. Fresno State stayed undefeated winning close games against Boise State, Hawaii and San Diego State and rose to #14 in the BCS Polls prior to their last game of the regular season against San Jose. After Fresno State lost to San Jose State they fell to #22 but continued to stay at the top of their division as the other five teams in the West Division lost more than one conference game, which led the team to their first division championship.

This was Fresno State's first appearance in Mountain West Conference Championship series.

== Scoring summary ==
Quarter	Time	Drive		Team	Scoring Information	Score	
Quarter	Time	Length	Time	Team	Scoring Information	Utah State	Fresno State
1	8:36	11 plays, 51 yards	3:07	Fresno State	Colin McGuire 30–yard kick good	0	3
2	13:40	7 plays, 45 yards	2:00	Fresno State	Marcel Jensen 3–yard reception from Derek Carr, Colin McGuire kick good	0	10
2	7:17	14 plays, 66 yards	4:54	Fresno State	Isaiah Burse 9–yard reception from Derek Carr, Colin McGuire kick good	0	17
2	0:03	0 plays, 86 yards	0:00	Utah State	Jake Doughty 86–yard fumble return, Nick Diaz kick good	7	17
3	1:33	13 plays, 59 yards	3:59	Fresno State	Davante Adams 3–yard reception from Derek Carr, Colin McGuire kick good	7	24
4	11:55	13 plays, 78 yards	4:38	Utah State	Bruce Natson 10–yard rush, Nick Diaz kick good	14	24
4	9:00	7 plays, 35 yards	2:55	Utah State	Nick Diaz 20–yard kick good	17	24
Final Score						17	24

=== Statistics ===
Statistics	Utah State	Fresno State
First downs	17	24
Total offense, plays – yards	75–304	87–460
Rushes-yards (net)	40–51	34–56
Passing yards (net)	253	404
Passes, Comp-Att-Int	16–35–2	36–53–2
Time of Possession	30:36	29:24
