= 2013 New Mexico Lobos football team =

American college football season

2013 New Mexico Lobos football
- Conference: Mountain West Conference
- Mountain Division
- Record: 3–9 (1–7 MW)
- Head coach: Bob Davie (2nd season)
- Offensive coordinator: Bob DeBesse (2nd season)
- Offensive scheme: Multiple pistol
- Defensive coordinator: Jeff Mills (2nd season)
- Base defense: 3–4
- Home stadium: University Stadium

2013 Mountain West Conference football standings
	Conf.			Overall
Team	W		L	W		L
Mountain Division
Utah State x	7	–	1	9	–	5
Boise State	6	–	2	8	–	5
Colorado State	5	–	3	8	–	6
Wyoming	3	–	5	5	–	7
New Mexico	1	–	7	3	–	9
Air Force	0	–	8	2	–	10
West Division
Fresno State x$	7	–	1	11	–	2
San Diego State	6	–	2	8	–	5
UNLV	5	–	3	7	–	6
San Jose State	5	–	3	6	–	6
Nevada	3	–	5	4	–	8
Hawaii	0	–	8	1	–	11
Championship: Fresno State 24, Utah State 17
$ – Conference champion; x – Division champion/co-champions; Rankings from AP Poll

The 2013 New Mexico Lobos football team represented the University of New Mexico as a member of the Mountain Division in the Mountain West Conference (MW) during the 2013 NCAA Division I FBS football season. Led by second-year head coach Bob Davie, the Lobos compiled an overall record of 3–9 with a mark of 1–7 in conference play, placing fifth the MW's Mountain Division. The team played home games at University Stadium in Albuquerque, New Mexico.

== Schedule ==
Date	Time	Opponent	Site	TV	Result	Attendance
August 31	6:00 p.m.	UTSA*	University Stadium; Albuquerque, NM	KASY	L 13–21	26,311
September 7	6:00 p.m.	at UTEP*	Sun Bowl; El Paso, TX	FCS	W 42–35 ^{OT}	34,907
September 14	10:30 a.m.	at Pittsburgh*	Heinz Field; Pittsburgh, PA	ESPN3	L 27–49	40,249
September 28	6:00 p.m.	UNLV^{†}	University Stadium; Albuquerque, NM		L 42–56	23,639
October 5	5:00 p.m.	New Mexico State*	University Stadium; Albuquerque, NM (Rio Grande Rivalry)	RTRM	W 66–17	29,749
October 12	1:30 p.m.	at Wyoming	War Memorial Stadium; Laramie, WY	RTRM	L 31–38	22,853
October 19	7:00 p.m.	Utah State	University Stadium; Albuquerque, NM	RTRM	L 10–45	19,739
November 2	6:00 p.m.	at San Diego State	Qualcomm Stadium; San Diego, CA	RTRM	L 30–35	35,890
November 8	7:00 p.m.	Air Force	University Stadium; Albuquerque, NM	ESPNU	W 45–37	21,833
November 16	5:00 p.m.	Colorado State	University Stadium; Albuquerque, NM	RTRM	L 42–66	19,376
November 23	5:00 p.m.	at No. 15 Fresno State	Bulldog Stadium; Fresno, CA	ESPNews	L 28–69	41,031
November 30	8:15 p.m.	at Boise State	Bronco Stadium; Boise, ID	ESPN2	L 17–45	31,645
*Non-conference game; ^{†}Homecoming; Rankings from AP Poll released prior to the game; All times are in Mountain time

== Game summaries ==
=== UTSA ===
	1	2	3	4	Total
Roadrunners	0	7	7	7	21
Lobos	6	7	0	0	13

=== At UTEP ===
	1	2	3	4	OT	Total
Lobos	7	14	0	14	7	42
Miners	0	21	7	7	0	35

=== At Pittsburgh ===
	1	2	3	4	Total
Lobos	3	3	14	7	27
Panthers	21	14	7	7	49

=== UNLV ===
	1	2	3	4	Total
Rebels	14	21	7	14	56
Lobos	21	14	7	0	42

=== New Mexico State ===
	1	2	3	4	Total
Aggies	0	14	3	0	17
Lobos	21	21	10	14	66

=== At Wyoming ===
	1	2	3	4	Total
Lobos	0	3	14	14	31
Cowboys	14	7	3	14	38

=== Utah State ===
	1	2	3	4	Total
Aggies	17	14	7	7	45
Lobos	0	3	0	7	10

=== At San Diego State ===
	1	2	3	4	Total
Lobos	7	0	10	13	30
Aztecs	14	0	7	14	35

=== Air Force ===
	1	2	3	4	Total
Falcons	0	14	14	9	37
Lobos	14	7	14	10	45

=== Colorado State ===
	1	2	3	4	Total
Rams	14	17	14	21	66
Lobos	7	14	21	0	42

=== At Fresno State ===
	1	2	3	4	Total
Lobos	0	0	21	7	28
#15 Bulldogs	14	21	28	6	69

=== At Boise State ===
	1	2	3	4	Total
Lobos	7	0	3	7	17
Broncos	14	7	7	17	45
