= 2013 Hawaii Rainbow Warriors football team =

American college football season

2013 Hawaii Rainbow Warriors football
- Conference: Mountain West Conference
- West Division
- Record: 1–11 (0–8 MW)
- Head coach: Norm Chow (2nd season)
- Offensive scheme: Pro-style
- Defensive coordinator: Thom Kaumeyer (2nd season)
- Base defense: 4–3
- Home stadium: Aloha Stadium

2013 Mountain West Conference football standings
| | Conf. | | | Overall |
| Team | W | | L | W | | L |
|---|---|---|---|---|---|---|
Mountain Division
| Utah State x | 7 | – | 1 | 9 | – | 5 |
| Boise State | 6 | – | 2 | 8 | – | 5 |
| Colorado State | 5 | – | 3 | 8 | – | 6 |
| Wyoming | 3 | – | 5 | 5 | – | 7 |
| New Mexico | 1 | – | 7 | 3 | – | 9 |
| Air Force | 0 | – | 8 | 2 | – | 10 |
West Division
| Fresno State x$ | 7 | – | 1 | 11 | – | 2 |
| San Diego State | 6 | – | 2 | 8 | – | 5 |
| UNLV | 5 | – | 3 | 7 | – | 6 |
| San Jose State | 5 | – | 3 | 6 | – | 6 |
| Nevada | 3 | – | 5 | 4 | – | 8 |
| Hawaii | 0 | – | 8 | 1 | – | 11 |
Championship: Fresno State 24, Utah State 17
$ – Conference champion; x – Division champion/co-champions; Rankings from AP Poll

The 2013 Hawaii Rainbow Warriors football team represented the University of Hawaiʻi at Mānoa in the 2013 NCAA Division I FBS football season. The team was led by second-year head coach Norm Chow and played their home games at Aloha Stadium. They were members of the Mountain West Conference in the West Division. They finished the season 1–11, 0–8 in Mountain West play to finish in last place in the West Division.

== Schedule ==
| Date | Time | Opponent | Site | TV | Result | Attendance |
|---|---|---|---|---|---|---|
| August 29 | 5:00 pm | No. 24 USC* | Aloha Stadium; Honolulu, HI | CBSSN | L 13–30 | 39,058 |
| September 7 | 2:00 pm | at Oregon State* | Reser Stadium; Corvallis, OR | P12N | L 14–33 | 38,179 |
| September 21 | 2:05 pm | at Nevada | Mackay Stadium; Reno, NV | Oceanic PPV | L 9–31 | 23,240 |
| September 28 | 6:00 pm | No. 23 Fresno State | Aloha Stadium; Honolulu, HI (rivalry) | Oceanic PPV | L 37–42 | 28,755 |
| October 5 | 6:00 pm | San Jose State | Aloha Stadium; Honolulu, HI (rivalry) | Oceanic PPV | L 27–37 | 27,146 |
| October 12 | 2:00 pm | at UNLV | Sam Boyd Stadium; Whitney, NV | Oceanic PPV | L 37–39 | 22,755 |
| October 26 | 6:00 pm | Colorado State^{†} | Aloha Stadium; Honolulu, HI | Oceanic PPV | L 28–35 | 29,752 |
| November 2 | 10:00 am | at Utah State | Romney Stadium; Logan, UT | CBSSN | L 10–47 | 21,428 |
| November 9 | 9:30 am | at Navy* | Navy–Marine Corps Memorial Stadium; Annapolis, MD | CBSSN | L 28–42 | 33,327 |
| November 16 | 5:30 pm | San Diego State | Aloha Stadium; Honolulu, HI | CBSSN | L 21–28 ^{OT} | 28,530 |
| November 23 | 10:00 am | at Wyoming | War Memorial Stadium; Laramie, WY (Paniolo Trophy) | Oceanic PPV | L 56–59 ^{OT} | 12,227 |
| November 30 | 6:00 pm | Army* | Aloha Stadium; Honolulu, HI | Oceanic PPV | W 49–42 | 32,690 |
*Non-conference game; ^{†}Homecoming; Rankings from AP Poll released prior to the game; All times are in Hawaii time

== Game summaries ==
=== USC ===
USC at Hawaii

| Team | 1 | 2 | 3 | 4 | Total |
|---|---|---|---|---|---|
| • #24 Trojans | 3 | 17 | 0 | 10 | 30 |
| Rainbow Warriors | 0 | 5 | 0 | 8 | 13 |

- Date: August 29
- Location: Aloha Stadium
  Honolulu, HI

=== At Oregon State ===
Hawaii at Oregon State

| Team | 1 | 2 | 3 | 4 | Total |
|---|---|---|---|---|---|
| Rainbow Warriors | 0 | 14 | 0 | 0 | 14 |
| • Beavers | 7 | 7 | 14 | 5 | 33 |

- Date: September 7
- Location: Reser Stadium
  Corvallis, OR

=== At Nevada ===
Hawaii at Nevada

| Team | 1 | 2 | 3 | 4 | Total |
|---|---|---|---|---|---|
| Rainbow Warriors | 3 | 6 | 0 | 0 | 9 |
| • Wolf Pack | 7 | 10 | 7 | 7 | 31 |

- Date: September 21
- Location: Mackay Stadium
  Reno, NV

=== Fresno State ===
Fresno State at Hawaii

| Team | 1 | 2 | 3 | 4 | Total |
|---|---|---|---|---|---|
| • #23 Bulldogs | 14 | 7 | 21 | 0 | 42 |
| Rainbow Warrors | 0 | 3 | 14 | 20 | 37 |

- Date: September 28
- Location: Aloha Stadium
  Honolulu, HI

=== San Jose State ===
San Jose State at Hawaii

| Team | 1 | 2 | 3 | 4 | Total |
|---|---|---|---|---|---|
| • Spartans | 10 | 17 | 7 | 3 | 37 |
| Rainbow Warriors | 14 | 0 | 7 | 6 | 27 |

- Date: October 5
- Location: Aloha Stadium
  Honolulu, HI

=== At UNLV ===
Hawaii at UNLV

| Team | 1 | 2 | 3 | 4 | Total |
|---|---|---|---|---|---|
| Rainbow Warriors | 0 | 17 | 0 | 20 | 37 |
| • Rebels | 0 | 13 | 17 | 9 | 39 |

- Date: October 12
- Location: Sam Boyd Stadium
  Whitney, NV

=== Colorado State ===
Colorado State at Hawaii

| Team | 1 | 2 | 3 | 4 | Total |
|---|---|---|---|---|---|
| • Rams | 14 | 21 | 0 | 0 | 35 |
| Rainbow Warriors | 7 | 10 | 0 | 11 | 28 |

- Date: October 26
- Location: Aloha Stadium
  Honolulu, HI

=== At Utah State ===
Hawaii at Utah State

| Team | 1 | 2 | 3 | 4 | Total |
|---|---|---|---|---|---|
| Rainbow Warriors | 3 | 0 | 7 | 0 | 10 |
| • Aggies | 10 | 13 | 17 | 7 | 47 |

- Date: November 2
- Location: Romney Stadium
  Logan, UT

=== At Navy ===
Hawaii at Navy

| Team | 1 | 2 | 3 | 4 | Total |
|---|---|---|---|---|---|
| Rainbow Warriors | 0 | 14 | 0 | 14 | 28 |
| • Midshipmen | 7 | 7 | 14 | 14 | 42 |

- Date: November 9
- Location: Navy–Marine Corps Memorial Stadium
  Annapolis, MD

=== San Diego State ===
San Diego State at Hawaii

| Team | 1 | 2 | 3 | 4 | OT | Total |
|---|---|---|---|---|---|---|
| • Aztecs | 0 | 7 | 7 | 7 | 7 | 28 |
| Rainbow Warriors | 7 | 7 | 0 | 7 | 0 | 21 |

- Date: November 16
- Location: Aloha Stadium
  Honolulu, HI

=== At Wyoming ===
Hawaii at Wyoming

| Team | 1 | 2 | 3 | 4 | OT | Total |
|---|---|---|---|---|---|---|
| Rainbow Warriors | 14 | 21 | 7 | 14 | 0 | 56 |
| • Cowboys | 13 | 22 | 7 | 14 | 3 | 59 |

- Date: November 23
- Location: War Memorial Stadium
  Laramie, WY

=== Army ===
Army at Hawaii

| Team | 1 | 2 | 3 | 4 | Total |
|---|---|---|---|---|---|
| Black Knights | 0 | 7 | 21 | 14 | 42 |
| • Rainbow Warriors | 14 | 14 | 14 | 7 | 49 |

- Date: November 30
- Location: Aloha Stadium
  Honolulu, HI
- Source: ESPN

== Depth chart ==
Defense

FS
Marrell Jackson
Kawika Borden
⋅

| WLB | MLB | SLB |
|---|---|---|
| ⋅ | Brenden Daley | ⋅ |
| Kamalani Alo | Julian Gener | ⋅ |
| Tavita Lataimua | Benetton Fonua | ⋅ |

SS
John Hardy-Tuliau
Charles Clay
Trayvon Henderson

CB
Ne'Quan Phillips
Daniel Masifilo
Joshua Donovan
Kwamane Bowens

| DE | DT | DT | DE |
|---|---|---|---|
| Beau Yap | Siasau Matagiese | Moses Samia | Tavita Woodard |
| Ho'oikaika Cavaco-Amoy | Marcus Malepeai | Kennedy Tulimasealii | Craig Cofer |
| George Daily-Lyles | Calen Friel | Mike Andrade | Niko Uti; Iuta Tepa |

CB
Dee Maggitt
Anthony Pierce
Michael Martin
Damien Packer

Offense

WR
Chris Gant
Keith Kirkwood
Vasquez Haynes

WR
Scott Harding
Allen Sampson
Donnie King Jr.

| LT | LG | C | RG | RT |
|---|---|---|---|---|
| Mike Milovale | Kody Afusia | Ben Clarke | Dave Lefotu | Sean Shigematsu |
| Leo Koloamatangi | Ben Dew | Brenden Urban | Frank Lloyd Jr. | David Griffin |
| ⋅ | Kiha Sai | ⋅ | ⋅ | ⋅ |

TE
Harold Moleni
Clark Evans
Jordan Pu’u-Robinson

WR
Billy Ray Stutzmann
Marcus Kemp
Bubba Poueu-Luna

QB
Sean Schroeder
Taylor Graham
Ikaiaka Woolsey
Jeremy Higgins

RB
Joey Iosefa
Steven Lakalaka
Aofaga Wily
Diocemy Saint Juste

Special teams
PK Tyler Hadden
P Scott Harding
Ruben Guzman
KR Chris Gant
Diocemy Saint Juste
PR Scott Harding
Donny King Jr.
LS Brodie Nakama
Kawika Borden
H Ikaika Woolsey
