= 2013 Air Force Falcons football team =

American college football season

2013 Air Force Falcons football
- Conference: Mountain West Conference
- Mountain Division
- Record: 2–10 (0–8 MW)
- Head coach: Troy Calhoun (7th season)
- Offensive coordinator: Clay Hendrix (7th season)
- Co-offensive coordinators: Blane Morgan (7th season); Mike Thiessen (5th season)
- Offensive scheme: Triple option
- Defensive coordinator: Charlton Warren (6th season)
- Co-defensive coordinator: Steve Russ (2nd season)
- Base defense: Multiple 3–4
- Captain: Game captains
- Home stadium: Falcon Stadium

2013 Mountain West Conference football standings
	Conf.			Overall
Team	W		L	W		L
Mountain Division
Utah State x	7	–	1	9	–	5
Boise State	6	–	2	8	–	5
Colorado State	5	–	3	8	–	6
Wyoming	3	–	5	5	–	7
New Mexico	1	–	7	3	–	9
Air Force	0	–	8	2	–	10
West Division
Fresno State x$	7	–	1	11	–	2
San Diego State	6	–	2	8	–	5
UNLV	5	–	3	7	–	6
San Jose State	5	–	3	6	–	6
Nevada	3	–	5	4	–	8
Hawaii	0	–	8	1	–	11
Championship: Fresno State 24, Utah State 17
$ – Conference champion; x – Division champion/co-champions; Rankings from AP Poll

The 2013 Air Force Falcons football team represented the United States Air Force Academy as a member of the Mountain Division in the Mountain West Conference (MW) during the 2013 NCAA Division I FBS football season. Led by seventh-year head coach Troy Calhoun, the Falcons compiled an overall record of 2–10 with a mark of 0–8 in conference play, placing last out of six teams in the MW's Mountain Division. The team played home games at Falcon Stadium in Colorado Springs, Colorado

== Schedule ==
Date	Time	Opponent	Site	TV	Result	Attendance
August 31	1:00 p.m.	Colgate*	Falcon Stadium; Colorado Springs, CO	RTRM	W 38–13	32,095
September 7	1:30 p.m.	Utah State	Falcon Stadium; Colorado Springs, CO	CBSSN	L 20–52	32,716
September 13	6:00 p.m.	at Boise State	Bronco Stadium; Boise, ID	ESPN	L 20–42	36,069
September 21	8:15 p.m.	Wyoming	Falcon Stadium; Colorado Springs, CO	ESPNU	L 23–56	35,389
September 28	4:30 p.m.	at Nevada	Mackay Stadium; Reno, NV	CBSSN	L 42–45	24,545
October 5	9:30 a.m.	at Navy*	Navy–Marine Corps Memorial Stadium; Annapolis, MD (Commander-in-Chief's Trophy)	CBS	L 10–28	38,225
October 10	7:00 p.m.	San Diego State	Falcon Stadium; Colorado Springs, CO	CBSSN	L 20–27	17,280
October 26	3:00 p.m.	Notre Dame*	Falcon Stadium; Colorado Springs, CO (rivalry)	CBSSN	L 10–45	44,672
November 2	10:00 a.m.	Army*	Falcon Stadium; Colorado Springs, CO (Commander-in-Chief's Trophy)	ESPNU	W 42–28	36,512
November 8	7:00 p.m.	at New Mexico	University Stadium; Albuquerque, NM	ESPNU	L 37–45	21,833
November 21	7:30 p.m.	UNLV	Falcon Stadium; Colorado Springs, CO	ESPNU	L 21–41	29,898
November 30	12:00 p.m.	at Colorado State	Hughes Stadium; Fort Collins, CO (rivalry)	ESPN3	L 13–58	15,546
*Non-conference game; All times are in Mountain time

== Game summaries ==
=== Colgate ===
	1	2	3	4	Total
Raiders	7	0	0	6	13
Falcons	0	21	10	7	38

=== Utah State ===
	1	2	3	4	Total
Aggies	14	10	21	7	52
Falcons	6	7	0	7	20

=== At Boise State ===
	1	2	3	4	Total
Falcons	7	10	0	3	20
Broncos	7	14	7	14	42

=== Wyoming ===
	1	2	3	4	Total
Cowboys	14	28	7	7	56
Falcons	10	7	0	6	23

=== At Nevada ===
	1	2	3	4	Total
Falcons	7	14	14	7	42
Wolf Pack	7	10	7	21	45

=== At Navy ===
	1	2	3	4	Total
Falcons	3	7	0	0	10
Midshipmen	0	7	7	14	28

=== San Diego State ===
	1	2	3	4	Total
Aztecs	6	0	0	21	27
Falcons	0	10	10	0	20

=== Notre Dame ===
	1	2	3	4	Total
Fighting Irish	7	17	14	7	45
Falcons	7	3	0	0	10

=== Army ===
	1	2	3	4	Total
Black Knights	14	7	0	7	28
Falcons	7	14	7	14	42

=== At New Mexico ===
	1	2	3	4	Total
Falcons	0	14	14	9	37
Lobos	14	7	14	10	45

=== UNLV ===
	1	2	3	4	Total
Rebels	20	13	0	8	41
Falcons	0	14	7	0	21

=== At Colorado State ===
	1	2	3	4	Total
Falcons	0	0	0	13	13
Rams	13	17	21	7	58
