= 2013 San Jose State Spartans football team =

American college football season

2013 San Jose State Spartans football
- Conference: Mountain West Conference
- West Division
- Record: 6–6 (5–3 MW)
- Head coach: Ron Caragher (1st season)
- Offensive coordinator: Jimmie Dougherty (1st season)
- Offensive scheme: Multiple
- Defensive coordinator: Kenwick Thompson (1st season)
- Base defense: 3–4
- Home stadium: Spartan Stadium

2013 Mountain West Conference football standings
	Conf.			Overall
Team	W		L	W		L
Mountain Division
Utah State x	7	–	1	9	–	5
Boise State	6	–	2	8	–	5
Colorado State	5	–	3	8	–	6
Wyoming	3	–	5	5	–	7
New Mexico	1	–	7	3	–	9
Air Force	0	–	8	2	–	10
West Division
Fresno State x$	7	–	1	11	–	2
San Diego State	6	–	2	8	–	5
UNLV	5	–	3	7	–	6
San Jose State	5	–	3	6	–	6
Nevada	3	–	5	4	–	8
Hawaii	0	–	8	1	–	11
Championship: Fresno State 24, Utah State 17
$ – Conference champion; x – Division champion/co-champions; Rankings from AP Poll

The 2013 San Jose State Spartans football team represented San José State University in the 2013 NCAA Division I FBS football season. The Spartans were led by first year head coach Ron Caragher and played their home games at Spartan Stadium. The Spartans were first-year members of the Mountain West Conference in the West Division. They finished the season 6–6, 5-3 in Mountain West play to finish in a tie for third place in the West Division. Despite being bowl eligible, the Spartans were not invited to a bowl game.

== Schedule ==
Date	Time	Opponent	Site	TV	Result	Attendance
August 29	7:00 pm	Sacramento State*	Spartan Stadium; San Jose, CA	MWN	W 24–0	13,136
September 7	8:00 pm	at No. 5 Stanford*	Stanford Stadium; Stanford, CA (Bill Walsh Legacy Game)	P12N	L 13–34	50,424
September 21	9:00 am	at Minnesota*	TCF Bank Stadium; Minneapolis, MN	ESPN2	L 24–43	45,647
September 27	6:00 pm	Utah State	Spartan Stadium; San Jose, CA	ESPN	L 12–40	10,533
October 5	9:00 pm	at Hawaii	Aloha Stadium; Halawa, HI (Dick Tomey Legacy Game)	Oceanic PPV	W 37–27	27,146
October 12	12:30 pm	at Colorado State	Hughes Stadium; Fort Collins, CO	CBSSN	W 34–27	26,022
October 26	4:00 pm	Wyoming^{†}	Spartan Stadium; San Jose, CA	ROOT	W 51–44	16,123
November 2	1:00 pm	at UNLV	Sam Boyd Stadium; Whitney, NV	MWN	W 34–24	15,837
November 9	7:30 pm	San Diego State	Spartan Stadium; San Jose, CA	CBSSN	L 30–34	17,932
November 16	7:30 pm	at Nevada	Mackay Stadium; Reno, NV	ESPNU	L 16–38	20,737
November 22	6:30 pm	Navy*	Spartan Stadium; San Jose, CA	ESPN2	L 52–58 ^{3OT}	16,876
November 29	12:30 pm	No. 16 Fresno State	Spartan Stadium; San Jose, CA (rivalry)	CBSSN	W 62–52	23,574
*Non-conference game; ^{†}Homecoming; Rankings from AP Poll released prior to the game; All times are in Pacific time

== Game summaries ==
=== Sacramento State ===
	1	2	3	4	Total
Hornets	0	0	0	0	0
Spartans	3	14	7	0	24

Scoring summary

1st quarter

SJSU—Lopez 37 yd field goal 8:30 SJSU 3–0

2nd quarter

SJSU—Jones 31 yd pass from Fales (Lopez kick is good) 13:10 SJSU 10–0

SJSU—Grigsby 15 yd pass from Fales (Lopez kick is good) 0:54 SJSU 17–0

3rd quarter

SJSU—Simpson 54 yd run (Lopez kicked is good) 8:20 SJSU 24–0

4th quarter

No scoring

=== At Stanford ===
	1	2	3	4	Total
Spartans	3	3	7	0	13
No. 5 Cardinal	7	10	10	7	34

1st quarter

STAN-Cajuste 40 yd pass from Hogan (Williamson kick is good) 10:12 STAN 7–0

=== At Minnesota ===
	1	2	3	4	Total
Spartans	0	17	0	7	24
Golden Gophers	7	13	9	14	43

=== Utah State ===
	1	2	3	4	Total
Aggies	14	9	14	3	40
Spartans	3	3	6	0	12

=== At Hawaii ===
	1	2	3	4	Total
Spartans	10	17	7	3	37
Rainbow Warriors	14	0	7	6	27

=== At Colorado State ===
	1	2	3	4	Total
Spartans	3	14	7	10	34
Rams	7	17	0	3	27

=== Wyoming ===
	1	2	3	4	Total
Cowboys	16	7	7	14	44
Spartans	0	14	22	15	51

=== At UNLV ===
	1	2	3	4	Total
Spartans	14	10	0	10	34
Rebels	0	3	14	7	24

=== San Diego State ===
	1	2	3	4	Total
Aztecs	0	12	0	22	34
Spartans	10	10	3	7	30

=== At Nevada ===
	1	2	3	4	Total
Spartans	10	6	0	0	16
Wolf Pack	7	14	14	3	38

=== Navy ===
	1	2	3	4	OT	2OT	3OT	Total
Midshipmen	0	10	14	14	7	7	6	58
Spartans	3	13	6	16	7	7	0	52

=== Fresno State ===
	1	2	3	4	Total
Bulldogs	27	14	3	8	52
Spartans	21	21	10	10	62

== After the season ==
=== Awards ===
Spartan quarterback David Fales won the Alan B. Simpkins Most Valuable Player Award at the San Jose State football awards banquet in December 2013. At the same event, Keith Smith won the Outstanding Defensive Player award, and Chandler Jones the Outstanding Offensive Player award.

Conference

Bené Benwikere, Chandler Jones, and Keith Smith were named to the All-MWC first team. Second-team All-MWC picks were David Fales, Nicholas Kaspar, and Austin Lopez. Billy Freeman and Ryan Jones were honorable mention All-MWC selections, and the MWC also named Tyler Winston the Freshman of the Year.

A record 16 San Jose State football players were selected to the Academic All-MWC Team for the Fall 2013 semester.

National

Chandler Jones and Bené Benwikere were invited to the 2014 East–West Shrine Game. David Fales was invited to the 2014 Senior Bowl and became the first San Jose State quarterback invited to the Senior Bowl.

=== Coaching changes ===
After Vanderbilt hired Kenwick Thompson as defensive coordinator shortly after the close of the 2013 season, San Jose State hired Greg Robinson to replace Thompson. Robinson was previously defensive coordinator at Texas in 2013, and his experience includes defensive coordinator of the Denver Broncos from 1995 to 2000, including the teams that won Super Bowls XXXII and XXXIII.

Keith Carter replaced offensive line coach Hank Fraley, who left for the Minnesota Vikings. Carter previously served as offensive quality control coach for the Super Bowl XLVIII championship winning Seattle Seahawks. Terry Malley, formerly the tight ends coach in 2013, moved to wide receivers coach for 2014 and replaced Greg Lewis, who left for Pittsburgh. Joe Staab moved from coaching safeties to outside linebackers. In addition to being offensive coordinator and quarterbacks coach, Jimmie Dougherty became assistant head coach. Graduate assistant Andrew Rolin was promoted to the full running backs coach position.

=== NFL draft ===
In the 2014 NFL draft, two San Jose State players were selected. Bené Benwikere was selected in the 5th round, 148th overall by the Carolina Panthers. David Fales was selected in the 6th round, 183rd overall by the Chicago Bears.

== Rankings ==
Ranking movements Legend: ██ Increase in ranking ██ Decrease in ranking — = Not ranked RV = Received votes
	Week																
Poll	Pre	1	2	3	4	5	6	7	8	9	10	11	12	13	14	15	Final
AP	—	—	—	—	—	—	—	—	—	—	—	—	—	—	—	—	—
Coaches	RV	RV	—	—	—	—	—	—	—	—	—	—	—	—	—	—	—
Harris	Not released							—	—	—	—	—	—	—	—	—	Not released
BCS	Not released								—	—	—	—	—	—	—	—	Not released

== Personnel ==
After Mike MacIntyre resigned as head coach at San Jose State to accept the head coaching job at the University of Colorado Boulder, San Jose State hired University of San Diego head coach Ron Caragher on December 17, 2012, however, defensive coordinator Kent Baer served as interim head coach for San Jose State's victory in the 2012 Military Bowl on December 27, 2012. Several of Caragher's assistant coaches from San Diego followed Caragher to San Jose State, including Jimmie Dougherty, Donte Williams, and Joe Staab. Kenwick Thompson, a defensive assistant coach for San Jose State from 2001 to 2006 and for Cal from 2007 to 2012, returned to San Jose State as defensive coordinator.

Name	Position	Seasons at San Jose State	Alma mater
Ron Caragher	Head coach	1	UCLA (1990)
Jimmie Dougherty	Offensive coordinator, quarterbacks	1	Missouri (2001)
Hank Fraley	Offensive line	1	Robert Morris (2012)
Fred Guidici	Special teams	2	San Jose State (1989)
James Jones	Defensive line	1	Texas Southern (1998)
Greg Lewis	Wide receivers	1	Illinois (2002)
Terry Malley	Tight ends, recruiting coordinator	5	Santa Clara (1976)
Joe Staab	Safeties	1	San Diego (2008)
Kenwick Thompson	Defensive coordinator, linebackers	7	Harding (1992)
Donte Williams	Cornerbacks	1	Idaho State (2006)

=== Returning starters ===
==== Offense ====
Player	Class	Position
Noel Grigsby	Senior	Wide receiver
Jabari Carr	Junior	Wide receiver
Ryan Jones	Senior	Offensive guard
Reuben Hasani	Senior	Center
Nicholas Kaspar	Senior	Offensive guard
Jon Meyer	Senior	Offensive tackle
David Fales	Senior	Quarterback

==== Defense ====
Player	Class	Position
Travis Raciti	Junior	Defensive tackle
Anthony Larceval	Senior	Defensive tackle
Keith Smith	Senior	Linebacker
Vince Buhagiar	Senior	Linebacker
Derek Muaava	Junior	Linebacker
Bené Benwikere	Senior	Cornerback

==== Special teams ====
Player	Class	Position
Harrison Waid	Senior	Punter
Austin Lopez	Sophomore	Placekicker
