= 2013 Colorado State Rams football team =

American college football season

2013 Colorado State Rams football
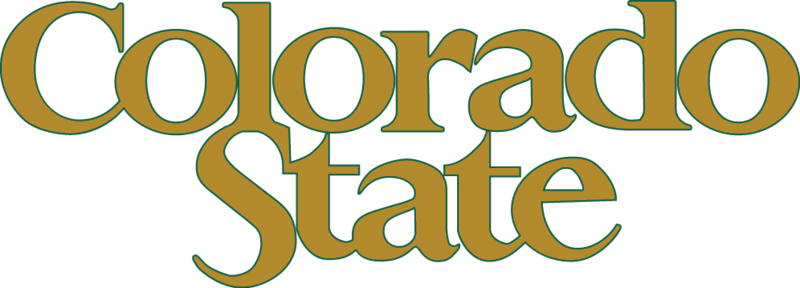

New Mexico Bowl champion

New Mexico Bowl, W 48–45 vs. Washington State
- Conference: Mountain West Conference
- Mountain Division
- Record: 8–6 (5–3 MW)
- Head coach: Jim McElwain (2nd season)
- Offensive coordinator: Dave Baldwin (2nd season)
- Offensive scheme: Multiple
- Co-defensive coordinators: Marty English (2nd season); Al Simmons (2nd season)
- Base defense: 4–3
- Home stadium: Sonny Lubick Field at Hughes Stadium

2013 Mountain West Conference football standings
	Conf.			Overall
Team	W		L	W		L
Mountain Division
Utah State x	7	–	1	9	–	5
Boise State	6	–	2	8	–	5
Colorado State	5	–	3	8	–	6
Wyoming	3	–	5	5	–	7
New Mexico	1	–	7	3	–	9
Air Force	0	–	8	2	–	10
West Division
Fresno State x$	7	–	1	11	–	2
San Diego State	6	–	2	8	–	5
UNLV	5	–	3	7	–	6
San Jose State	5	–	3	6	–	6
Nevada	3	–	5	4	–	8
Hawaii	0	–	8	1	–	11
Championship: Fresno State 24, Utah State 17
$ – Conference champion; x – Division champion/co-champions; Rankings from AP Poll

The 2013 Colorado State Rams football team represented Colorado State University in the 2013 NCAA Division I FBS football season. The Rams were led by second-year head coach Jim McElwain and played their home games at Sonny Lubick Field at Hughes Stadium. They were members of the Mountain Division of the Mountain West Conference. They finished the season 8–6, 5–3 in Mountain West play to finish in third place in the Mountain Division. They were invited to the New Mexico Bowl where they defeated Washington State.

== Schedule ==
Date	Time	Opponent	Site	TV	Result	Attendance
September 1	4:00 p.m.	vs. Colorado*	Sports Authority Field at Mile High; Denver, CO (Rocky Mountain Showdown)	CBSSN	L 27–41	59,601
September 7	5:00 p.m.	at Tulsa*	Skelly Field at H. A. Chapman Stadium; Tulsa, OK	CBSSN	L 27–30	22,875
September 14	1:30 p.m.	No. 14 (FCS) Cal Poly*	Hughes Stadium; Fort Collins, CO		W 34–17	14,146
September 21	5:00 p.m.	at No. 1 Alabama*	Bryant–Denny Stadium; Tuscaloosa, AL	ESPN2	L 6–31	101,821
September 28	1:30 p.m.	UTEP*	Hughes Stadium; Fort Collins, CO	CBSSN	W 59–42	19,517
October 12	1:30 p.m.	San Jose State	Hughes Stadium; Fort Collins, CO	CBSSN	L 27–34	26,022
October 19	12:00 p.m.	at Wyoming	War Memorial Stadium; Laramie, WY (Battle for the Bronze Boot)	RTRM	W 52–22	24,953
October 26	10:00 p.m.	at Hawaii	Aloha Stadium; Honolulu, HI		W 35–28	29,752
November 2	6:00 p.m.	Boise State	Hughes Stadium; Fort Collins, CO	CBSSN	L 30–42	21,133
November 9	1:30 p.m.	Nevada	Hughes Stadium; Fort Collins, CO	Campus Insiders	W 38–17	15,234
November 16	5:00 p.m.	at New Mexico	University Stadium; Albuquerque, NM	RTRM	W 66–42	19,376
November 23	1:30 p.m.	at Utah State	Romney Stadium; Logan, UT	CBSSN	L 0–13	20,284
November 30	12:00 p.m.	Air Force	Hughes Stadium; Fort Collins, CO (Battle for the Ram–Falcon Trophy)	ESPN3	W 58–13	15,546
December 21	12:00 p.m.	vs. Washington State*	University Stadium; Albuquerque, NM (New Mexico Bowl)	ESPN	W 48–45	27,104
*Non-conference game; Rankings from AP Poll released prior to the game; All times are in Mountain time

== Game summaries ==
=== vs Colorado ===
	1	2	3	4	Total
Rams	0	10	14	3	27
Buffaloes	10	10	3	18	41

=== At Tulsa ===
	1	2	3	4	Total
Rams	7	13	7	0	27
Golden Hurricane	14	0	3	13	30

=== Cal Poly ===
	1	2	3	4	Total
No. 14 (FCS) Mustangs	3	7	7	0	17
Rams	13	14	0	7	34

=== At Alabama ===
	1	2	3	4	Total
Rams	0	0	6	0	6
No. 1 Crimson Tide	7	10	0	14	31

=== UTEP ===
	1	2	3	4	Total
Miners	7	0	21	14	42
Rams	14	14	9	22	59

=== San Jose State ===
	1	2	3	4	Total
Spartans	3	14	7	10	34
Rams	7	17	0	3	27

=== At Wyoming ===
	1	2	3	4	Total
Rams	14	10	14	14	52
Cowboys	0	7	8	7	22

=== At Hawaii ===
	1	2	3	4	Total
Rams	14	21	0	0	35
Warriors	7	10	0	11	28

=== Boise State ===
	1	2	3	4	Total
Broncos	7	21	7	7	42
Rams	10	7	0	13	30

=== Nevada ===
	1	2	3	4	Total
Wolf Pack	0	7	10	0	17
Rams	3	3	18	14	38

=== At New Mexico ===
	1	2	3	4	Total
Rams	14	17	14	21	66
Lobos	7	14	21	0	42

=== At Utah State ===
	1	2	3	4	Total
Rams	0	0	0	0	0
Aggies	0	3	7	3	13

=== Air Force ===
	1	2	3	4	Total
Falcons	0	0	0	13	13
Rams	13	17	21	7	58

=== Washington State (New Mexico Bowl) ===
	1	2	3	4	Total
Cougars	21	14	3	7	45
Rams	10	13	7	18	48

== Players in the 2014 NFL draft ==
Player	Position	Round	Pick	NFL club
Weston Richburg	C	2	43	New York Giants
Crockett Gillmore	TE	3	99	Baltimore Ravens
Shaquil Barrett	LB	UDFA*	N/A	Denver Broncos

* = undrafted free agent.
