= Jamar Cain =

American football coach and player (born 1980)

Denver Broncos
- Title: Defensive line coach

Personal information
- Born: October 1, 1980 (age 46); Sacramento, California, U.S.

Career information
- College: Sacramento City College (1999–2000) New Mexico State (2001–2002)

Career history
- Sacramento City (2004) Assistant; Ohio (2005) Graduate assistant; Missouri State (2006–2008) Defensive ends coach; Cal Poly (2009–2012) Defensive line coach; Wyoming (2013) Defensive line coach; North Dakota State (2014–2016) Defensive line coach; Fresno State (2017–2018) Defensive line coach; Arizona State (2019) Defensive line coach; Oklahoma (2020–2021) Outside linebackers coach & defensive ends coach; LSU (2022) Defensive line coach; Denver Broncos (2023–present); Pass rush specialist (2023); Defensive line coach (2024–present)

Awards and highlights
- 2× NCAA Division I FCS national champion (2014, 2015)

Jamar Cain (born October 1, 1980) is an American professional football coach and former player who is the defensive line coach for the Denver Broncos of the National Football League (NFL). He has been an assistant coach for various college football programs since 2005.

== Coaching career ==
=== Early coaching career ===
Cain began his coaching career as a high school coach. He then went on to work as an assistant coach at Sacramento City College. In 2005 he got his first opportunity at the FBS level as a graduate assistant under Frank Solich at Ohio. From 2006 to 2008 he worked as the defensive ends coach for Missouri State. From 2009 to 2012 he was the defensive line coach for Cal Poly.

=== Wyoming ===
In 2013 he served as the defensive line coach for Wyoming. He was promoted to defensive coordinator midway through the season.

=== North Dakota State ===
Cain spent three seasons as the defensive ends coach at North Dakota State before taking a defensive line position at San Jose State. He was part of NDSU's fourth and fifth straight FCS national championships in 2014 and 2015 and the team's sixth consecutive Missouri Valley Football Conference title in 2016.

Cain helped in developing 2014 Buck Buchanan Award winner and consensus All-American Kyle Emanuel, who had 19.5 sacks and 32.5 tackles for loss his senior year and was a fifth round NFL draft pick. He also coached All-American Greg Menard, a nominee for the 2016 Buck Buchanan Award.

=== Fresno State ===
After originally taking a job at San Jose State. In 2017 and 2018 he worked as the defensive line coach for Fresno State.

=== Arizona State ===
In 2019 he worked as the defensive line coach for ASU. With Cain on staff, ASU's 2019 run defense was significantly better than the year before he arrived. It ranked 26th nationally in 2019 by allowing 125.1 rushing yards per game, and 24th by permitting 3.5 yards per carry. In 2018, before he was on staff, ASU ranked 74th and 66th, respectively, at 170.5 and 4.3.

=== Oklahoma ===
In 2020 and 2021 he worked as the outside linebackers and defensive ends coach for the Sooners.

=== LSU ===
After originally following Lincoln Riley to USC. Cain decided to join Brian Kelly's inaugural LSU staff as the defensive line coach and defensive run game coordinator.

=== Denver Broncos ===
Cain was hired on March 25, 2023 as a pass rushing specialist for the Denver Broncos. He was promoted to defensive line coach after Marcus Dixon left to take the same job with the Minnesota Vikings.

== Personal life ==
Cain is the uncle of Kansas City Chiefs defensive tackle Omarr Norman-Lott.
