= Hawaii Bowl =

Annual college football bowl game

Hawaiʻi Bowl
- Sheraton Hawaiʻi Bowl
- Stadium: Clarence T. C. Ching Athletics Complex
- Location: Honolulu, Hawaii
- Previous locations: Aloha Stadium, Honolulu, Hawaii
- Operated: 2002–present
- Conference tie-ins: MWC (2012–present; Hawaii if bowl-eligible and not in College Football Playoff); Pac-12 (2026–present)
- Previous conference tie-ins: WAC (2002–2011); C-USA (2002–2018); Pac-12 (2005–2008, 2026-present); American (2019–2024)
- Payout: US$1.2 million (2019)
- Website: thehawaiibowl.com
- Preceded by: Aloha Bowl

Sponsors
- ConAgra Foods (2002); Sheraton Hotels and Resorts Hawaii (2003–2013); SoFi (2018–2019); EasyPost (2021–2023); Sheraton (2025–present)

Former names
- ConAgra Foods Hawai'i Bowl (2002); Sheraton Hawai'i Bowl (2003–2013); Hawai'i Bowl (2014–2017, 2024); SoFi Hawai'i Bowl (2018–2019); EasyPost Hawai'i Bowl (2021–2023)

2025 matchup
- California vs. Hawaiʻi (Hawaiʻi 35–31)

The Hawaiʻi Bowl (Note: The bowl name often appears as Hawaii Bowl, without the okina character.) is a college football bowl game that has been played in the Honolulu, Hawaii, area since 2002. The game was originally held at Aloha Stadium in Halawa, Hawaii, a suburb of Honolulu, before moving to the Clarence T. C. Ching Athletics Complex in 2022. The bowl is one of the post-season contests run by ESPN Events. Typically played on or near Christmas Eve, the bowl normally features a team from the Mountain West Conference, playing a team from either the American Conference or Conference USA.

For practical and logistical reasons, the Mountain West Conference's tie-in is automatically allocated to the Hawaii Rainbow Warriors if the team is bowl-eligible, and was not selected to play in the College Football Playoff (first round and New Year's Six bowl games; or previously, BCS). This means that the Rainbow Warriors do not have to travel to the mainland for a bowl game unless it is of significant importance. As a result of this practice, the Rainbow Warriors have made the most appearances in the game, at ten.

For the 2021 through 2023 editions, the bowl was sponsored by EasyPost. Previous sponsors include ConAgra Foods (2002) and Sheraton Hotels and Resorts Hawaii (2003–2013), and SoFi (2018–2019). The 2024 edition had no sponsor. On April 24, 2025, it was announced that Sheraton would be returning as the title sponsor of the game.

== Bowl games in Hawaii ==
The Hawaii Bowl is not affiliated with other bowl games previously staged in Hawaii: the Poi Bowl (1936–1939), Pineapple Bowl (1940–1941, 1947–1952), Aloha Bowl (1982–2000), and Oʻahu Bowl (1998–2000), or the Hula Bowl all-star game (1960–2008, and resuming in 2020). While the Aloha Bowl tried to move to San Francisco, California, and was decertified by the NCAA, the Oahu Bowl was moved to Seattle, Washington, and was held for two years as the Seattle Bowl before losing certification in 2002.

== Game history ==
In its first year, the Hawai'i Bowl was sponsored by ConAgra Foods, making it officially the ConAgra Foods Hawai'i Bowl. The following year, Sheraton Hotels and Resorts Hawaii assumed sponsorship; the game's full name was changed to the Sheraton Hawai'i Bowl until Sheraton declined to renew sponsorship in 2014. In 2018, SoFi signed on as title sponsor of the game which is officially known as the SoFi Hawai'i Bowl.

The current Mountain West tie-in was held by the Western Athletic Conference (WAC) until 2012, when the WAC ceased sponsoring college football, and Hawaii moved to the Mountain West.

The first two editions were played on the Aloha Bowl's traditional Christmas Day date, but ESPN's acquisition of NBA rights came with the league's Christmas Day games, thus the game moved to Christmas Eve after 2004 in most years.

The 2005 appearance of the UCF Knights at the Hawaii Bowl was the first ever bowl game in that school's history. In 2006, the Pac-10 replaced Conference USA (C-USA) as the WAC's opposition, with C-USA as an alternate. Since Christmas Eve fell on a Monday in 2007, the game was scheduled for Sunday night, December 23, to avoid a conflict with Monday Night Football (also on ESPN). In 2008, the bowl organizers selected Notre Dame as an at-large bid, marking the first time an independent played in the contest. C-USA again became a primary tie-in starting in 2009. The 2011 game featured the C-USA champion for the first time, as Southern Mississippi played instead of going to the Liberty Bowl, where the C-USA champion typically played at the time. The bowl featured the Mountain West champion for the first time in 2015, as San Diego State played instead of going to the Las Vegas Bowl, where the Mountain West champion typically plays.

Between 2002 and 2018, C-USA sent a team to the bowl 12 times, registering an 8–4 record. In 2019, the American Athletic Conference (The American) superseded C-USA as the primary tie-in to face a Mountain West team (or independent BYU).

On October 2, ESPN Events announced that the 2020 edition of the bowl game had been canceled due to the COVID-19 pandemic.

On August 10, 2021, EasyPost was announced as the new sponsor of the bowl, making it the EasyPost Hawai'i Bowl. EasyPost remained the sponsor through the 2023 edition.

On December 23, 2021, the game was cancelled for the second consecutive season, after the Rainbow Warriors withdrew due to injuries and COVID-19 issues within the team.

The 2024 edition of the bowl took five overtime periods to decide, setting a new record for the most overtime periods in a Football Bowl Subdivision (FBS) bowl game, with the South Florida Bulls defeating the San Jose State Spartans. However, this record was surpassed just two days later when the 2024 GameAbove Sports Bowl took six overtimes to decide.

=== Tenth anniversary team (2011) ===
To celebrate the tenth anniversary of the Hawai'i Bowl, the Honolulu Star-Advertiser, in conjunction with the bowl game, allowed fans to vote on a tenth anniversary team. Nine players were selected by a public vote, and an additional seven players were picked by a panel of sportswriters and organizers. The team was announced on December 16, 2011.

Ten Year Anniversary Team
Year	Player	College	Performance
2002	Justin Colbert	Hawaii	9 catches for 158 yards and 2 TD's.
2003	Timmy Chang; Jackie Battle	Hawaii; Houston	26 for 42, 475 yards, 5 TD's passing. 19 carries for 124 yards and 3 TD's.
2004	Chad Owens	Hawaii	8 catches for 114 yards, 2 TD's. 5 punt returns for 90 yards and a TD.
2005	Caleb Spencer; Brandon Marshall	Nevada; UCF	11 receptions for 114 yards. 11 receptions for 210 yards and 3 TD's.
2006	Colt Brennan; Jason Rivers	Hawaii; Hawaii	33 for 42, 559 yards and 5 TD's. 14 receptions for 308 yards and 2 TD's.
2007	Chris Johnson	East Carolina	408 all purpose yards, 2 TD's.
2008	Golden Tate; Jimmy Clausen; Aaron Bain	Notre Dame; Notre Dame; Hawaii	6 receptions for 177 yards and 3 TD's. 22 for 26, 401 yards and 5TD's; 8 receptions for 109 yards and 2 TD's.
2009	Kyle Padron	SMU	32 of 41 passing for 460 yards and 2 TD's.
2010	Damaris Johnson; Curnelius Arnick; Greg Salas	Tulsa; Tulsa; Hawaii	5 carries for 98 yards and 1 TD, 4 receptions for 101 yards and 1 TD, 6 returns for 127 yards. 2 sacks, 8 UA Tackles, 2 Asst. Tackles, 2.5 TFL, 2 Int's for 106 yards and 1 TD; 13 receptions for 214 yards and 2 TD's.

== Game results ==
Date	Winning team		Losing team		Attendance	notes
December 25, 2002	Tulane	36	Hawaiʻi	28	35,513	notes
December 25, 2003	Hawaiʻi	54	Houston	48 (3OT)	29,005	notes
December 24, 2004	Hawaiʻi	59	UAB	40	39,754	notes
December 24, 2005	Nevada	49	UCF	48 (OT)	16,134	notes
December 24, 2006	Hawaiʻi	41	Arizona State	24	43,435	notes
December 23, 2007	East Carolina	41	Boise State	38	30,467	notes
December 24, 2008	Notre Dame	49	Hawaiʻi	21	43,487	notes
December 24, 2009	SMU	45	Nevada	10	32,650	notes
December 24, 2010	Tulsa	62	Hawaiʻi	35	43,673	notes
December 24, 2011	Southern Miss	24	Nevada	17	32,630	notes
December 24, 2012	SMU	43	Fresno State	10	30,024	notes
December 24, 2013	Oregon State	38	Boise State	23	29,106	notes
December 24, 2014	Rice	30	Fresno State	6	25,365	notes
December 24, 2015	San Diego State	42	Cincinnati	7	22,793	notes
December 24, 2016	Hawaiʻi	52	Middle Tennessee	35	23,175	notes
December 24, 2017	Fresno State	33	Houston	27	20,546	notes
December 22, 2018	Louisiana Tech	31	Hawaiʻi	14	30,911	notes
December 24, 2019	Hawaiʻi	38	BYU	34	21,582	notes
December 24, 2020	Canceled due to the COVID-19 pandemic				—	—
December 24, 2021	Canceled (Note: The 2021 game had been scheduled to feature Memphis vs. Hawaiʻi.)				—	—
December 24, 2022	Middle Tennessee	25	San Diego State	23	6,605	notes
December 23, 2023	Coastal Carolina	24	San Jose State	14	7,089	notes
December 24, 2024	South Florida	41	San Jose State	39 (5OT)	6,720	notes
December 24, 2025	Hawaiʻi	35	California	31	15,194	notes

== MVPs ==
=== 2002–2019 ===
The bowl named an MVP from each team from inception through the 2019 edition.

Year	Winning team MVP			Losing team MVP		
Year	Player	Team	Position	Player	Team	Position
2002	Lynaris Elpheage	Tulane	CB	Justin Colbert	Hawaiʻi	WR
2003	Timmy Chang	Hawaiʻi	QB	Jackie Battle	Houston	RB
2004	Timmy Chang; Chad Owens	Hawaiʻi	QB; WR	Darrell Hackney	UAB	QB
2005	B.J. Mitchell	Nevada	RB	Brandon Marshall	UCF	WR
2006	Colt Brennan; Jason Rivers	Hawaiʻi	QB; WR	Ryan Torain	Arizona State	RB
2007	Chris Johnson	East Carolina	RB	Jeremy Avery	Boise State	RB
2008	Jimmy Clausen; Golden Tate	Notre Dame	QB; WR	Aaron Bain	Hawaiʻi	WR
2009	Kyle Padron	SMU	QB	Kevin Basped	Nevada	DE
2010	Damaris Johnson	Tulsa	WR	Greg Salas	Hawaiʻi	WR
2011	Cordarro Law	Southern Miss	DL	Lampford Mark	Nevada	RB
2012	Margus Hunt	SMU	DE	Davante Adams	Fresno State	WR
2013	Rashaad Reynolds	Oregon State	CB	Matt Miller	Boise State	WR
2014	Driphus Jackson; Brian Nordstrom	Rice	QB; DE	Carl Mickelsen	Fresno State	LB
2015	Dakota Gordon	San Diego State	FB	Zach Edwards	Cincinnati	S
2016	Dru Brown	Hawaiʻi	QB	Richie James	Middle Tennessee	WR
2017	Marcus McMaryion	Fresno State	QB	Steven Dunbar	Houston	WR
2018	Jaylon Ferguson	Louisiana Tech	DE	Kendall Hune	Hawaiʻi	DE
2019	Cole McDonald	Hawaiʻi	QB	Zach Wilson	BYU	QB

=== 2022–present ===
Since the 2022 playing, the award—given to a single player—has been known as the Hugh Yoshida Most Valuable Player Award, honoring a former athletic director at the University of Hawai'i.

Year	Bowl MVP			Ref.
Year	Player	Team	Position	Ref.
2022	Jordan Ferguson	Middle Tennessee	DE	
2023	Ethan Vasko	Coastal Carolina	QB	
2024	John Cannon	South Florida	K	
2025	Pofele Ashlock	Hawaiʻi	WR	

== Most appearances ==
Updated through the December 2025 edition (22 games, 44 total appearances).

Teams with multiple appearances

Rank	Team	Appearances	Won	Lost	Win pct.
1	Hawai'i	10	6	4	.600
2	Nevada	3	1	2	.333
2	Fresno State	3	1	2	.333
4	SMU	2	2	0	1.000
4	Middle Tennessee	2	1	1	.500
4	San Diego State	2	1	1	.500
4	Houston	2	0	2	.000
4	Boise State	2	0	2	.000
4	San Jose State	2	0	2	.000

Teams with a single appearance

Won (10): Coastal Carolina, East Carolina, Louisiana Tech, Notre Dame, Oregon State, Rice, South Florida, Southern Miss, Tulane, Tulsa
Lost (6): Arizona State, BYU, California, Cincinnati, UAB, UCF

== Appearances by conference ==
Updated through the December 2025 edition (22 games, 44 total appearances).

Conference	Record				Appearances by season	
Conference	Games	W	L	Win pct.	Won	Lost
C-USA	13	9	4	.692	2002, 2007, 2009, 2010, 2011, 2012, 2014, 2018, 2022	2003, 2004, 2005, 2016
Mountain West	12	5	7	.417	2015, 2016, 2017, 2019, 2025	2012, 2013, 2014, 2018, 2022, 2023, 2024
WAC	10	4	6	.400	2003, 2004, 2005, 2006	2002, 2007, 2008, 2009, 2010, 2011
The American	3	1	2	.333	2024	2015, 2017
Pac-12	2	1	1	.500	2013	2006
Independents	2	1	1	.500	2008	2019
Sun Belt	1	1	0	1.000	2023	
ACC	1	0	1	.000		2025

- The record of the Pac-12 includes appearances when the conference was known as the Pac-10 (before 2011).
- The WAC no longer sponsors FBS football.
- Independent appearances: Notre Dame (2008), BYU (2019)

== Game records ==
Team	Record, Team vs. Opponent	Year
Most points scored (one team)	62, Tulsa vs. Hawaiʻi	2010
Most points scored (losing team)	48, shared by: Houston vs. Hawaiʻi; UCF vs. Nevada	2003; 2005
Most points scored (both teams)	102, Hawaiʻi vs. Houston	2003
Fewest points allowed	6, Rice vs. Fresno State	2014
Largest margin of victory	35, shared by: SMU vs. Nevada; San Diego State vs. Cincinnati	2009; 2015
Total yards	680, Hawaiʻi vs. Arizona State	2006
Rushing yards	369, Nevada vs. UCF	2005
Passing yards	559, Hawaiʻi vs. Arizona State	2006
First downs	32, Hawaiʻi vs. Arizona State	2006
Fewest yards allowed	170, San Diego State vs. Middle Tennessee	2022
Fewest rushing yards allowed	–66, San Diego State vs. Middle Tennessee	2022
Fewest passing yards allowed	93, Rice vs. Fresno State	2014
Individual	Record, Player, Team vs. Opponent	Year
All-purpose yards	408, Chris Johnson, East Carolina vs. Boise State	2007
Touchdowns (all-purpose)	3, several players—most recent: Shawnbrey McNeal, SMU vs. Nevada	2009
Rushing yards	224, Chris Johnson, East Carolina vs. Boise State	2007
Rushing touchdowns	3, several players—most recent: Shawnbrey McNeal, SMU vs. Nevada	2009
Passing yards	559, Colt Brennan, Hawaiʻi vs. Arizona State	2006
Passing touchdowns	6, Colt Brennan, Hawaiʻi vs. Arizona State	2006
Receptions	14, shared by: Jason Rivers, Hawaiʻi vs. Arizona State; Pofele Ashlock, Hawaiʻi vs. Calfiornia	2006; 2025
Receiving yards	308, Jason Rivers, Hawaiʻi vs. Arizona State	2006
Receiving touchdowns	3, several players—most recent: Golden Tate, Notre Dame vs. Hawaiʻi	2008
Tackles	16, Roosevelt Cooks, Nevada vs. UCF	2005
Sacks	4, Willie Baker, Louisiana Tech vs. Hawaiʻi	2018
Interceptions	2, several players—most recent: Khoury Bethley, Hawaiʻi vs. BYU	2019
Long Plays	Record, Player, Team vs. Opponent	Year
Touchdown run	78, Kevin Smith, UCF vs. Nevada	2005
Touchdown pass	85, Matt Miller from Grant Hedrick, Boise State vs. Oregon State	2013
Kickoff return	100, Rashaad Penny, San Diego State vs. Cincinnati	2015
Punt return	60, Chad McCullar, Houston vs. Hawaiʻi	2003
Interception return	83, Hayden Greenbauer, SMU vs. Fresno State	2012
Fumble return	70, Rashaad Reynolds, Oregon State vs. Boise State	2013
Punt	73, Mat McBriar, Hawaiʻi vs. Tulane	2002
Field goal	52, Jack Browning, San Diego State vs. Middle Tennessee	2022

== Media coverage ==
The bowl has been televised on ESPN since its inception.
