= Brandin Cooks =

American football player (born 1993)

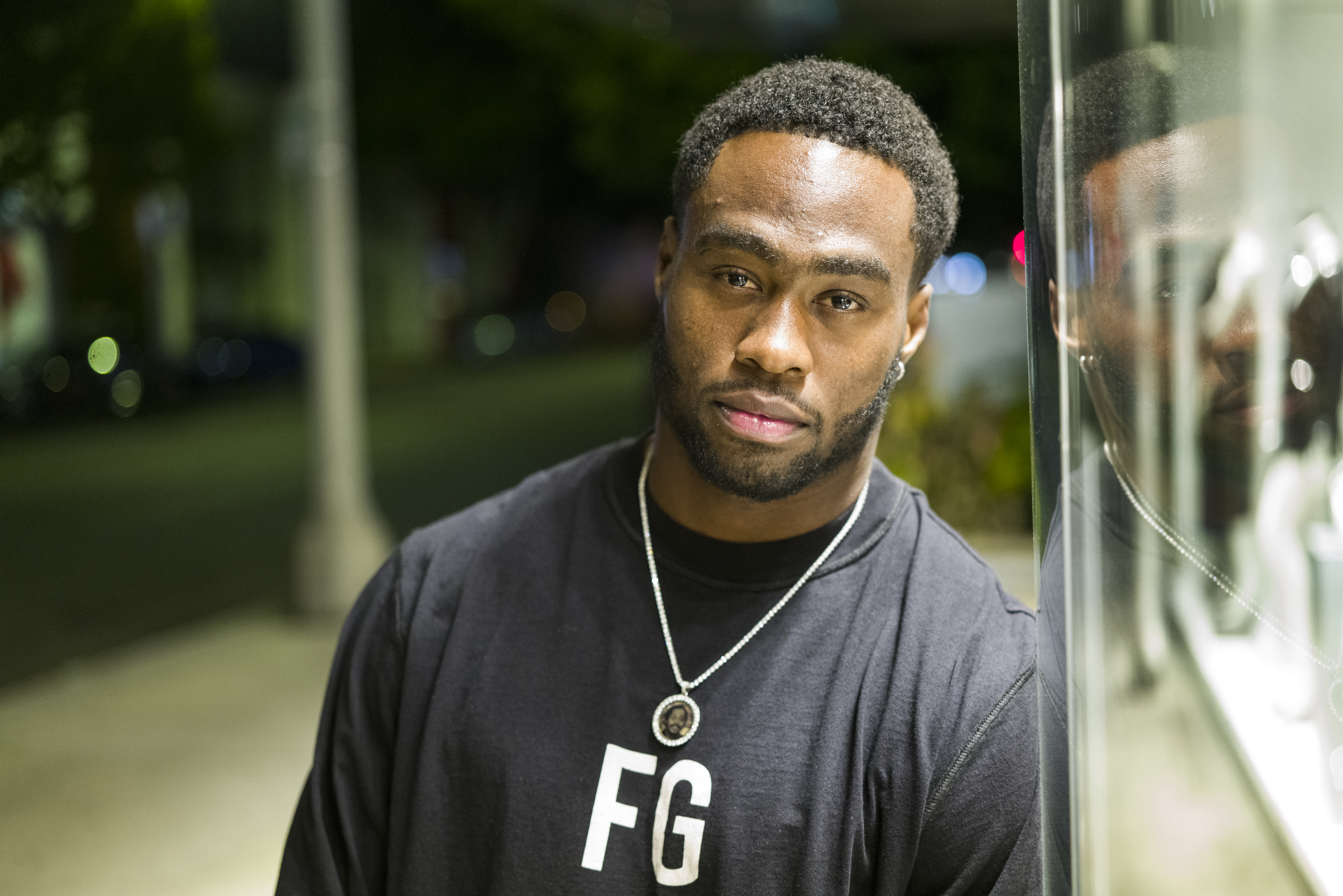
- Cooks in 2019

Profile
- Position: Wide receiver

Personal information
- Born: September 25, 1993 (age 33); Stockton, California, U.S.
- Listed height: 5 ft 10 in (1.78 m)
- Listed weight: 190 lb (86 kg)

Career information
- High school: Lincoln (Stockton)
- College: Oregon State (2011–2013)
- NFL draft: 2014: 1st round, 20th overall pick

Career history
- New Orleans Saints (2014–2016); New England Patriots (2017); Los Angeles Rams (2018–2019); Houston Texans (2020–2022); Dallas Cowboys (2023–2024); New Orleans Saints (2025); Buffalo Bills (2025); San Francisco 49ers (2026)

Awards and highlights
- Fred Biletnikoff Award (2013); Consensus All-American (2013); NCAA receiving yards leader (2013); First-team All-Pac-12 (2013)

Career NFL statistics as of Week 9, 2026
- Receptions: 739
- Receiving yards: 9,869
- Receiving touchdowns: 61
- Rushing yards: 341
- Rushing touchdowns: 2
- Stats at Pro Football Reference

Brandin Tawan Cooks (born September 25, 1993) is an American professional football wide receiver. He played college football for the Oregon State Beavers, receiving the Fred Biletnikoff Award and consensus All-American honors in 2013 after leading the NCAA in receiving yards. Cooks was selected by the New Orleans Saints in the first round of the 2014 NFL draft and has also played for the New England Patriots, Los Angeles Rams, Houston Texans, Dallas Cowboys, and Buffalo Bills.

== Early life ==
Cooks was born in Stockton, California, to Worth Cooks Sr. and Andrea (Glasper) Cooks on September 25, 1993. Worth died of a heart attack when Brandin was six years old and Cooks and his three brothers, Fred, Worth Jr., and Andre, were thereafter raised by their mother. He attended Lincoln High School in Stockton, where he played high school football for the Trojans. As a sophomore, Cooks recorded 29 receptions for 600 yards and seven touchdowns. As a junior, he had 46 receptions for 783 yards and 10 touchdowns, while also collecting three interceptions on the defensive side of the ball. As a senior, Cooks had 66 receptions for 1,125 yards and 11 touchdowns. He was ranked by the Rivals.com recruiting network as the 26th-best wide receiver and the 240th overall prospect in his class. Cooks originally committed to play college football at UCLA but changed to Oregon State University. In addition to high school football, he played basketball and ran track.

== College career ==
Cooks played at Oregon State from 2011 to 2013 under head coach Mike Riley.

=== 2011 season ===
Cooks made an immediate impact for Oregon State in their 3–9 season. Cooks recorded three receptions for 26 yards in the 29–28 loss in his collegiate debut against Sacramento State. On October 15, against BYU, he had three receptions for 90 yards and his first collegiate receiving touchdown, which came on a 59-yard reception from quarterback Sean Mannion, in the 38–28 loss. He played in all 12 games with three starts and recorded 31 receptions for 391 yards and three touchdowns. In addition, he returned kickoffs, averaging 22.4 yards per return on eight attempts.

=== 2012 season ===
Cooks started his sophomore season with six receptions for 80 yards and a touchdown in a 10–7 victory over Wisconsin. Two weeks later, against UCLA, he had six receptions for 175 yards and a touchdown in the 27–20 victory. In the following game against Arizona, he had nine receptions for 149 yards in the 38–35 victory. On October 13, against BYU, he had eight receptions for 173 yards in the 42–24 victory. On October 27, against Washington, he had nine receptions for 123 yards and a touchdown in the 20–17 loss. On November 3, against Arizona State, he had six receptions for 116 yards in the 36–26 victory. Overall, he had 67 receptions for 1,151 yards and five touchdowns. The combination of Cooks and Markus Wheaton created one of the most dynamic receiving duos in college football and Oregon State history. The two players combined for 158 receptions, 2,395 yards, and 16 touchdowns in the 2012 season as Oregon State improved from the previous season to a 9–4 record.

=== 2013 season ===
Cooks started the 2013 season with 13 receptions for 196 yards and two touchdowns in the 49–46 loss to Eastern Washington. In the next game, against Hawaii, he had seven receptions for 92 yards and two touchdowns in the 33–14 victory. One week later, against Utah, he had nine receptions for 210 yards and three touchdowns in the 51–48 victory. The performance marked his only game as a Beaver with three receiving touchdowns. In the following game against San Diego State, he had a collegiate career-high 14 receptions for 141 yards in the 34–30 victory. His 14 receptions tied a school single-game record with Mike Hass and Isaiah Hodgins. He continued to perform well with nine receptions for 168 yards and two touchdowns against Colorado in the next game, a 44–17 victory. Cooks started October with 11 receptions for 137 yards and two touchdowns against Washington State in the 52–24 victory. In the following week against California, he had 13 receptions for a collegiate career-high 232 yards and a touchdown in the 49–17 victory. His 232 receiving yards were the second-most in a game in school history, behind Mike Hass's 293 against Boise State in 2004. In the next two games, against Stanford and USC, he had receiving touchdowns in both games. On November 23, against Washington, he had 10 receptions for 117 yards and a touchdown in the 69–27 loss. In the regular season finale against Oregon, he had ten receptions for 110 yards in the 36–35 loss. Oregon State finished with a 6–6 record and qualified for the Hawaii Bowl. Against Boise State, he had eight receptions for 60 yards and a touchdown in the 38–23 victory.

Cooks finished the 2013 season with 128 receptions for 1,730 yards and 16 touchdowns, with his 1,730 receiving yards leading the NCAA. Cooks's receptions and receiving yards were Pac-12 Conference records. His 128 receptions shattered the school single-season record, previously held by James Rodgers and Markus Wheaton with 91 each. He was held to under 100 yards only four times and exceeded 200 yards in a game twice. At the end of the season, he won the Fred Biletnikoff Award and was a consensus All-American. He was the second Oregon State player to win the Biletnikoff Award, the first being Mike Hass in 2005. He finished his collegiate career among the best in school history by being second in receptions, third in receiving yards, and first in receiving touchdowns. Cooks and quarterback Sean Mannion teamed up for 23 receiving touchdowns over their careers, a school record for a quarterback-receiver tandem.

On January 2, 2014, Cooks announced that he would forgo his senior season and enter the 2014 NFL draft.

In addition to football, Cooks ran track at Oregon State. He earned a second-place finish in the 60-meter dash at the 2012 UW Invitational, clocking a personal-best time of 6.81 seconds.

== Professional career ==
Pre-draft measurables
Height	Weight	Arm length	Hand span	Wingspan	40-yard dash	10-yard split	20-yard split	20-yard shuttle	Three-cone drill	Vertical jump	Broad jump	Bench press
5 ft 9 3/4 in (1.77 m)	189 lb (86 kg)	30 3/4 in (0.78 m)	9 5/8 in (0.24 m)	6 ft 1 in (1.85 m)	4.33 s	1.54 s	2.53 s	3.81 s	6.76 s	36 in (0.91 m)	10 ft 0 in (3.05 m)	16 reps
All values from NFL Combine

=== New Orleans Saints ===
==== 2014 season ====
Cooks was selected by the New Orleans Saints as the 20th overall pick of the first round of the 2014 NFL draft; the Saints traded up from the 27th spot, giving their first and third-round picks to the Arizona Cardinals in return for Arizona's first-round pick, in order to get Cooks. Cooks was the highest drafted player out of Oregon State since Ken Carpenter went 13th overall in the first round of the 1950 NFL draft. He was also the highest drafted wide receiver in school history. On May 18, 2014, the Saints signed Cooks to a four-year contract worth $8.3 million.

In his first NFL game, Cooks had seven receptions for 77 yards and a touchdown and had an 18-yard rush during a 37–34 overtime road loss to the Atlanta Falcons. This made Cooks the youngest player, at 20 years and 347 days, to catch a touchdown pass since Reidel Anthony caught one against the Miami Dolphins on September 28, 1997, at 20 years and 343 days.

During Week 8 against the Green Bay Packers, Cooks recorded six receptions for 94 yards and a touchdown to go along with a four-yard rushing touchdown in the 44–23 home victory. Two weeks later against the San Francisco 49ers, he caught five passes for 90 yards and a touchdown in the 27–24 loss. In the next game against the Cincinnati Bengals, Cooks had to leave the eventual 27–10 loss with an injury. It was later revealed that he broke his thumb, prematurely ending his rookie season.

Cooks finished his rookie season with 53 receptions for 550 yards and three touchdowns to go along with seven carries for 73 yards and a touchdown in 10 games and seven starts as the Saints went 7–9 and missed the playoffs.

==== 2015 season ====
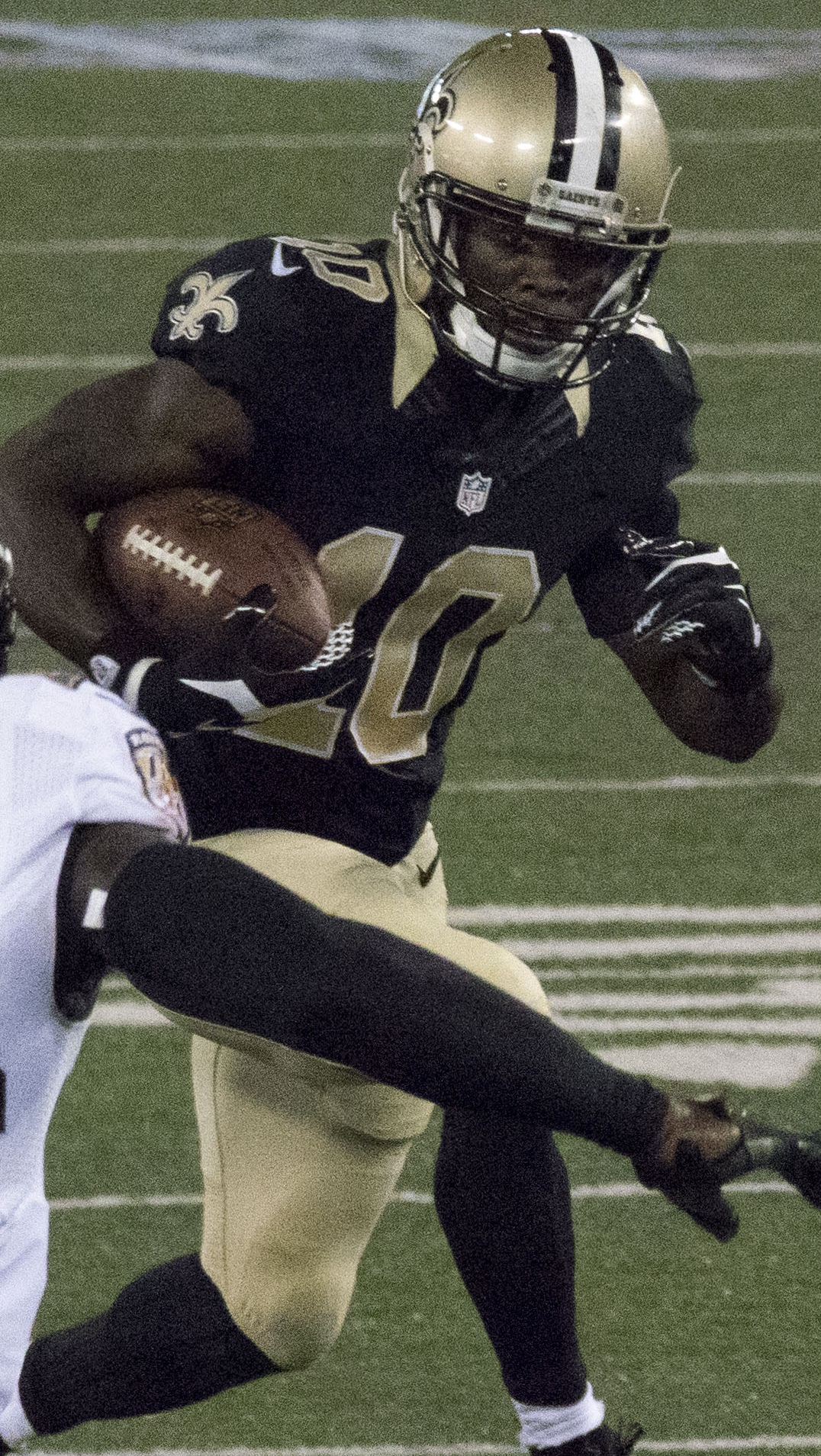
Cooks in 2015

Cooks began the 2015 season as the #1 wide receiver for the Saints. In the first four games of the season, he totaled 20 receptions for 215 yards as the team started 1–3. Cooks caught for over 100 yards in a game for the first time in his career in the Week 5 game against the Philadelphia Eagles, where he had five receptions for 107 yards and a touchdown during the 39–17 road loss. Three weeks later, Cooks caught six passes for 88 yards and two touchdowns in a 52–49 victory over the New York Giants. His two touchdowns were part of a record-tying seven touchdowns thrown by Drew Brees.

During a Week 10 47–14 loss to the Washington Redskins, Cooks had five receptions for 98 yards and two touchdowns to go along with an 11-yard rush. Three weeks later against the Carolina Panthers, he caught six passes for 104 yards and a touchdown in the 41–38 loss. In Weeks 15 and 16 combined, Cooks had 15 receptions for 247 yards and two touchdowns against the Detroit Lions and Jacksonville Jaguars. The Saints finished the 2015 season with a 7–9 record and missed the playoffs.

Cooks finished his second professional season with 84 receptions for 1,138 yards and nine touchdowns in 16 games and 12 starts, leading the Saints in all of those categories.

==== 2016 season ====
Before the 2016 season, Cooks was pegged as a breakout candidate by ESPN. He lived up to the pre-season hype when he recorded six receptions for 143 yards and two touchdowns and an 11-yard rush during the narrow season-opening 35–34 loss to the Oakland Raiders. Cooks caught a 98-yard touchdown pass in the third quarter to set the Saints' franchise record for the longest play from scrimmage. He, Willie Snead IV, and rookie Michael Thomas, finished the day with 373 receiving yards combined, the most ever by a New Orleans trio in a loss. During a Week 6 41–38 victory against the Panthers, Cooks had seven receptions for 173 yards and an 87-yard touchdown.

After a Week 12 49–21 victory over the Los Angeles Rams, in which Cooks was not targeted for a single pass, he voiced his frustration by saying, "Closed mouths don't get fed." Three weeks later against the Cardinals, Cooks caught seven passes for a career-high 186 yards and two touchdowns, one for 65 yards and one for 45 yards, in the 48–41 road victory. The Saints finished with a 7–9 record and missed the playoffs.

Cooks finished the 2016 season with 78 receptions for a then career-high in receiving yards with 1,173 and eight touchdowns in 16 games and 12 starts. He finished seventh in the NFL in receiving yards. Although Cooks' targets dropped from 129 in 2015 to 117 in 2016, his 10.0 yards per target ranked sixth among NFL wide receivers.

=== New England Patriots ===
On March 10, 2017, the New England Patriots traded their 2017 first-round (used on Ryan Ramczyk) and third-round draft picks (one was originally acquired from the Cleveland Browns in exchange for Jamie Collins) to the Saints for Cooks and a 2017 fourth-round draft pick. On April 29, the Patriots picked up the fifth-year option on Cooks' contract.

During a Week 3 36–33 victory over the Houston Texans, Cooks had five receptions for 131 yards and scored his first two touchdowns as a Patriot, including a 25-yard game winner with 23 seconds left; after the game-winning touchdown, he scored on the ensuing two-point conversion. During Week 11 against the Raiders at Estadio Azteca, he had six receptions for 149 yards and a season long 64-yard touchdown in the 33–8 victory.

Cooks finished his only season with the Patriots with 65 receptions for 1,082 yards and seven touchdowns to go along with nine carries for 40 yards in 16 games and 15 starts. Cooks and tight end Rob Gronkowski combined to form a 1,000-yard receiving duo for the Patriots, which was their first since 2011. Cooks finished second on the team to Gronkowski in receptions, receiving yards, and receiving touchdowns on the season.

The Patriots finished atop the AFC East with a 13–3 record and earned the #1-seed in the playoffs. In the Divisional Round against the Tennessee Titans, Cooks recorded three receptions for 32 yards during the 35–14 victory. During the AFC Championship Game against the Jaguars, he caught six passes for 100 yards in the 24–20 victory. In Super Bowl LII against the Eagles, Cooks had a 23-yard reception and a one-yard rush, but left the game early in the second quarter with a concussion after getting tackled by Eagles safety Malcolm Jenkins. He was placed on concussion protocol and took no further part in the Super Bowl as the Patriots lost by a score of 41–33.

=== Los Angeles Rams ===
==== 2018 season ====
On April 3, 2018, the Patriots traded Cooks and a fourth-round draft pick to the Rams for a first-round pick (used on Isaiah Wynn) and a sixth-round pick. On July 17, Cooks signed a five-year, $81 million extension with the Rams with $50.5 million guaranteed.

In Week 2 against the Cardinals, Cooks had seven receptions for a season-high 159 yards in the 34–0 shutout victory. Two weeks later against the Minnesota Vikings, Cooks had seven receptions for 116 yards and a touchdown along with a 10-yard rush in the 38–31 victory. In Week 9, Cooks was set to face off against his former team in the Saints. Following his trade to the Rams, Saints' starting receiver Michael Thomas instigated an online feud with Cooks out of anger for his departure from New Orleans. Cooks caught six receptions for 114 yards and a touchdown during the 45–35 road loss as Thomas in an effort to taunt Cooks and the Rams; would reenact Joe Horn's cellphone celebration upon scoring his final touchdown of the game to secure the Saints the lead. In the next game against the Seattle Seahawks, he had another great outing, catching ten passes for 100 yards and rushing for a nine-yard touchdown during the 36–31 victory. The following week against the Kansas City Chiefs, Cooks caught eight passes for 107 yards in the narrow 54–51 victory. In one of the highest-scoring back-and-forth games in NFL history, he helped convert a key first down on a 22-yard reception on the drive that put the Rams up for good. Following a Week 12 bye, the Rams went on the road to face the Lions. During the 30–16 road victory, Cooks eclipsed 1,000 receiving yards on the season. In the process, he became the first player in NFL history with 1,000 receiving yards in three consecutive seasons with three different teams.

Cooks finished the regular season with 80 receptions for a career-high 1,204 yards and five touchdowns to go along with 10 carries for 68 yards and a touchdown in 16 games and starts. The Rams finished atop the NFC West and earned the #2-seed in the playoffs. In the Divisional Round against the Dallas Cowboys, Cooks recorded four receptions for 65 yards and a five-yard rush during the 30–22 victory. During the NFC Championship Game against the Saints, Cooks had seven receptions for 107 yards in the controversial 26–23 overtime road victory to reach Super Bowl LIII. It was his second straight Super Bowl appearance, and the Rams faced off against Cooks' former team, the Patriots. During the Super Bowl, Cooks caught eight passes for 120 yards, but the Rams lost 13–3 in the lowest-scoring Super Bowl in history. He had three chances at scoring pivotal receiving touchdowns in the game. On the first attempt, Cooks was wide open in the endzone, but the play was broken up by Jason McCourty at the end. The second was a drop by Cooks in the endzone while being held by Duron Harmon when the Rams were trailing 10–3 with over four minutes left. The last occurred on the next play when Goff threw a pressured pass to Cooks that ended up being under thrown and intercepted by Stephon Gilmore.

==== 2019 season ====
During Week 3 against the Cleveland Browns, Cooks caught eight passes for 112 yards and had an eight-yard rush in the 20–13 road victory on NBC Sunday Night Football. Two weeks later against the Seahawks on Thursday Night Football, he had to leave the 30–29 road loss to be evaluated for a concussion. During Week 8 against the Bengals in London, Cooks suffered a concussion after taking a helmet-to-helmet hit from Jessie Bates during the first quarter. The Rams went on to win 24–10 and Cooks missed the next two games due to the concussion. He returned in Week 12 against the Baltimore Ravens.

Cooks finished the 2019 season with 42 receptions for 583 yards and two touchdowns in 14 games and starts, all his lowest totals since his rookie season in 2014. The Rams went 9–7 but missed the playoffs.

=== Houston Texans ===
On April 10, 2020, Cooks and a 2022 fourth-round draft pick were traded to the Texans in exchange for the Texans second-round draft pick, which was later used on Van Jefferson, in the 2020 NFL draft.

==== 2020 season ====
During Week 5 against the Jaguars, Cooks caught eight passes for 161 yards and his first touchdown as a Texan during the 30–14 victory. During Week 16 against the Bengals, Cooks recorded seven receptions for 141 yards and a touchdown in the 37–31 loss. In the regular-season finale against the Titans, he had 11 receptions for 166 yards and two touchdowns during the 41–38 loss.

Cooks finished the 2020 season with 81 receptions for 1,150 yards and six touchdowns in 15 games and starts as the Texans finished with a 4–12 record. He joined Brandon Marshall as the only players in NFL history to record a 1,000-yard receiving season with four different teams.

==== 2021 season ====
Cooks entered the season as a starting wide receiver for the Texans. He started the season with five receptions for a season-high 132 yards in a 37–21 victory over the Jaguars. Over the course of the season, Cooks was a very consistent option for the 3–14 Texans, totaling eight games with over five receptions, four total games with at least 100 receiving yards and five games with at least one touchdown. He finished the season as the team's leading receiver in all major statistical categories, recording a career-high 90 catches with 1,037 yards and six touchdowns. Cooks became the third player in franchise history to have consecutive 1,000-yard receiving seasons.

==== 2022 season ====
On April 7, 2022, despite multiple trade rumors, Cooks signed a two-year contract extension with the Texans worth $39.6 million with $36 million guaranteed. Before Week 13, Cooks suffered a calf injury in practice and missed two games. In the regular-season finale against the Indianapolis Colts, he had five receptions for 106 yards and a touchdown during the narrow 32–31 victory. Cooks finished the 2022 season with 57 receptions for 699 yards and three touchdowns in 13 games and starts as the Texans went 3–13–1. He led the team in receptions and receiving yards.

=== Dallas Cowboys ===
==== 2023 season ====
On March 19, 2023, the Texans traded Cooks to the Cowboys in exchange for a fifth-round pick in 2023 (#161-Nick Hampton) and a sixth-round pick in 2024. This trade made Cooks tie the NFL all-time record for most traded player held by retired running back, Eric Dickerson.

During the season opener, Cooks suffered a slight MCL sprain in the 40–0 shutout victory over the New York Giants. He did not play the following week against the New York Jets due to his injury. Cooks had a slow start to the season, tallying 17 catches for 165 yards and two touchdowns in the first eight games. In a Week 10 victory over the Giants, he had nine receptions for 173 yards and a touchdown. Cooks appeared in 16 games with 15 starts, making 54 receptions for 657 yards and eight touchdowns.

==== 2024 season ====
Prior to Week 5, Cooks was placed on injured reserve with a knee issue (infection that required a cleanup), forcing him to miss seven games. He appeared in 10 games with 9 starts, catching 26 passes for 259 yards and 3 touchdowns.

=== New Orleans Saints (second stint) ===
On March 21, 2025, Cooks signed a two-year, $13 million contract with the New Orleans Saints, the team that drafted him in the first round in 2014. Cooks was released on November 19, after requesting to be cut. He appeared in 10 games with 3 starts, posting 19 receptions for 165 yards and no touchdowns.

=== Buffalo Bills ===
On November 25, 2025, Cooks signed with the Buffalo Bills. During Week 17 against the Eagles, he had four receptions for 101 yards in the narrow 13–12 loss. He had 5 receptions for 114 yards in 5 games with two starts. He was declared inactive for the season finale.

In the Divisional Round against the Denver Broncos, Cooks was involved a pivotal and controversial ruling where a deep pass was intercepted by cornerback Ja'Quan McMillian in overtime. Both players jumped for the ball with Cooks landing on the field and McMillian landing on top of him and pulling the ball out of Cooks' hands in the end. The officials ruled it an interception and confirmed the call after video review. Following the interception, the Broncos went on to win 33–30 by driving down the field and kicking the game-winning field goal. In a postgame interview, head coach Sean McDermott criticized the officials' ruling of an interception and believed it should have been ruled a valid catch by Cooks.

=== San Francisco 49ers ===
On September 22, 2026, Cooks signed with the San Francisco 49ers' practice squad. On October 1, he was promoted to the active roster. He was waived on November 21.

== Career statistics ==
Legend
	Led the league
**Bold**	Career high

=== NFL ===
==== Regular season ====
Year	Team	Games		Receiving					Rushing					Returning					Fumbles	
Year	Team	GP	GS	Rec	Yds	Avg	Lng	TD	Att	Yds	Avg	Lng	TD	Ret	Yds	Avg	Lng	TD	Fum	Lost
2014	NO	10	7	53	550	10.4	50T	3	7	**73**	10.4	**28**	**1**	**11**	**47**	4.3	**15**	0	**1**	0
2015	NO	16	12	84	1,138	13.5	71T	**9**	8	18	2.3	11	0	2	12	**6.0**	6	0	**1**	0
2016	NO	16	12	78	1,173	15.0	**98T**	8	6	30	5.0	11	0	1	2	2.0	2	0	**1**	0
2017	NE	16	15	65	1,082	16.6	64T	7	9	40	4.4	13	0	0	0	0.0	0	0	0	0
2018	LAR	16	16	80	**1,204**	15.1	57	5	**10**	68	6.8	17	**1**	0	0	0.0	0	0	**1**	0
2019	LAR	14	14	42	583	13.9	57	2	6	52	8.7	27	0	0	0	0.0	0	0	0	0
2020	HOU	15	15	81	1,150	14.2	57	6	0	0	0.0	0	0	0	0	0.0	0	0	0	0
2021	HOU	16	16	**90**	1,037	11.5	52	6	2	21	**10.5**	16	0	0	0	0.0	0	0	0	0
2022	HOU	13	13	57	699	12.3	44	3	2	7	3.5	5	0	0	0	0.0	0	0	0	0
2023	DAL	16	15	54	657	12.2	37	8	5	35	7.0	14	0	0	0	0.0	0	0	**1**	0
2024	DAL	10	9	26	259	10.0	29	3	3	-3	-1.0	5	0	0	0	0.0	0	0	0	0
2025	NO	10	3	19	165	8.7	21	0	0	0	0.0	0	0	0	0	0.0	0	0	0	0
2025	BUF	5	2	5	114	**22.8**	50	0	0	0	0.0	0	0	0	0	0.0	0	0	0	0
2026	SF	5	2	5	58	11.6	13	1	0	0	0.0	0	0	0	0	0.0	0	0	0	0
Career		178	151	739	9,869	13.4	98T	61	58	341	5.9	28	2	14	61	4.4	15	0	5	0

==== Postseason ====
Year	Team	Games		Receiving					Rushing					Fumbles	
Year	Team	GP	GS	Rec	Yds	Avg	Lng	TD	Att	Yds	Avg	Lng	TD	Fum	Lost
2017	NE	3	3	10	155	15.5	31	0	**1**	1	1.0	1	0	0	0
2018	LAR	3	3	**19**	**292**	15.4	**36**	0	**1**	5	5.0	5	0	0	0
2023	DAL	1	1	6	47	7.8	18	0	**1**	**6**	**6.0**	**6**	0	0	0
2025	BUF	2	2	5	78	**15.6**	**36**	0	—	—	—	—	0	0	0
Total		9	9	40	572	14.3	36	0	3	12	4.0	6	0	0	0

=== College ===
Legend
Led the NCAA

Season	Team	GP	Receiving						Rushing			
Season	Team	GP	Rec	Yds	Avg	Lng	TD	Y/G	Att	Yds	Avg	TD
2011	Oregon State	12	31	391	12.6	59	3	32.6	10	41	4.1	0
2012	Oregon State	13	67	1,151	**17.2**	**75**	5	95.9	19	82	4.3	0
2013	Oregon State	13	**128**	**1,730**	13.5	55	**16**	**133.0**	**32**	**217**	**6.8**	**2**
Career		38	226	3,272	14.5	75	24	86.1	61	340	5.6	2

== Career highlights ==
=== Awards and honors ===
College

- Biletnikoff Award (2013)
- Consensus All-American (2013)
- NCAA receiving yards leader (2013)
- Hawaii Bowl Champion (2013)
- First-team All-Pac-12 (2013)
- All-Pac-12 Honorable Mention (2012)
- Pac-12 record for most receiving yards in a single season (2013)
- 1st all-time career receiving touchdowns at Oregon State (24 touchdowns)
- 3rd all-time career receiving yards at Oregon State (3,272 yards)
- 2013 NCAA leader in receiving yards (1,730 yards)
- 2013 Pac-12 leader in receiving touchdowns (16 touchdowns)
- 2013 Pac-12 leader in receptions (128 receptions)
- 2012 Pac-12 leader in yards per reception (17.2 yards)

=== Records ===
==== NFL records ====
- First player in NFL history with 1,000 receiving yards in three consecutive seasons with three different teams
- Most 1,000-yard receiving seasons with four different teams: 4 (tied with Brandon Marshall)

==== Rams franchise records ====
- Most games in a single postseason with at least 100 receiving yards: 2 (in 2018; tied with Isaac Bruce, Kevin Curtis, Tom Fears, and Cooper Kupp)
- Most targets in a Super Bowl: 13 (in Super Bowl LIII)

==== Saints franchise records ====
- Longest touchdown reception: 98 yards

== Personal life ==
Cooks is a Christian. He followed big plays in the 2016 season with a bow-and-arrow motion, referencing a Bible verse where a boy named Ishmael used his archery skills to survive in the desert after he nearly died there without water. Cooks earned a nickname as "the Archer".

Cooks married Briannon Lepman on July 7, 2018.

In 2020, Cooks donated $50,000 to his hometown of Stockton, California. The donation helped establish the Stockton Children's Fund, which serves local children impacted by the COVID-19 pandemic. In 2021, Cooks earned his Private Pilot License and Instrument Rating.

== See also ==
- List of Fred Biletnikoff Award winners
- List of NCAA major college football yearly receiving leaders
- List of New Orleans Saints first-round draft picks
