= Bob Gregory (American football) =

American football player and coach (born 1963)

Current position
- Title: Inside Linebackers Coach
- Team: California
- Conference: ACC

Biographical details
- Born: April 25, 1963 (age 63); Spokane, Washington, U.S.

Playing career
- 1984–1986: Washington State
- Positions: Linebacker, defensive back

Coaching career (HC unless noted)
- 1987: Washington University (DB)
- 1988: Washington University (DC)
- 1989–1990: Oregon (GA)
- 1991: Willamette (DB)
- 1992–1997: Willamette (DC)
- 1998–2000: Oregon (DB)
- 2001: Boise State (DC)
- 2002–2009: California (DC)
- 2010–2013: Boise State (LB)
- 2013: Boise State (interim HC)
- 2014–2015: Washington (LB)
- 2016–2020: Washington (LB/ST)
- 2021: Washington (DC/ILB/interim HC)
- 2022: Oregon (analyst)
- 2023–2024: Stanford (STC/S)
- 2025–2026: California (analyst)
- 2025–present: California (ILB)

Head coaching record
- Overall: 0–4

Bob Gregory (born April 25, 1963) is an American college football coach and former player who is currently the inside linebackers coach at California. He was previously the special teams coordinator and safeties coach at Stanford. He also served as defensive coordinator and interim head coach at Washington He served as the interim head football coach at Boise State University for one game during the 2013 season, the Hawaii Bowl.

Gregory took over as interim head coach at Washington on November 14, 2021, after Washington fired Jimmy Lake. Gregory also coached in Lake's place the day prior while Lake was serving a suspension.

In December 2022, Gregory joined Troy Taylor's inaugural staff at Stanford as the special teams coordinator and safeties coach.

== Head coaching record ==
Year	Team	Overall	Conference	Standing	Bowl/playoffs
Boise State (Mountain West Conference) (2013)
2013	Boise State	0–1 (Note: Gregory coached the bowl game after Chris Petersen departed for Washington)	0–0	(Mountain)	L Hawaii
Boise State:		0–1	0–0		
Washington Huskies (Pac-12 Conference) (2021)
2021	Washington	0–3 (Note: Gregory coached during Lake's suspension and then took over as interim head coach for the final two games)	0–3	5th (North)	
Washington:		0–3	0–3		
Total:		0–4			
