= 2013 Oregon State Beavers football team =

American college football season

2013 Oregon State Beavers football

Hawaii Bowl champion

Hawaii Bowl, W 38–23 vs. Boise State
- Conference: Pac-12 Conference
- North Division
- Record: 7–6 (4–5 Pac-12)
- Head coach: Mike Riley (13th season)
- Offensive coordinator: Danny Langsdorf (9th season)
- Offensive scheme: Multiple
- Defensive coordinator: Mark Banker (11th season)
- Base defense: 4–3
- Captains: Brandin Cooks; Michael Doctor; Grant Enger; Sean Mannion; Rashaad Reynolds
- Home stadium: Reser Stadium

2013 Pac-12 Conference football standings
	Conf.			Overall
Team	W		L	W		L
North Division
No. 11 Stanford xy$	7	–	2	11	–	3
No. 9 Oregon x	7	–	2	11	–	2
No. 25 Washington	5	–	4	9	–	4
Oregon State	4	–	5	7	–	6
Washington State	4	–	5	6	–	7
California	0	–	9	1	–	11
South Division
No. 21 Arizona State xy	8	–	1	10	–	4
No. 16 UCLA	6	–	3	10	–	3
No. 19 USC	6	–	3	10	–	4
Arizona	4	–	5	8	–	5
Utah	2	–	7	5	–	7
Colorado	1	–	8	4	–	8
Championship: Stanford 38, Arizona State 14
$ – BCS representative as conference champion; x – Division champion/co-champions; y – Championship game participant; Rankings from AP Poll

The 2013 Oregon State Beavers football team represented Oregon State University during the 2013 NCAA Division I FBS football season. The team was led by head coach Mike Riley, in his eleventh straight season and thirteenth overall. Home games were played at Reser Stadium in Corvallis, and they were members of the North Division of the Pac-12 Conference. The Beavers defeated the Boise State Broncos 38–23 in the Hawaii Bowl to end the season with a 7–6 record.

== Schedule ==
Date	Time	Opponent	Rank	Site	TV	Result	Attendance
August 31	3:00 pm	No. 4 (FCS) Eastern Washington*	No. 25	Reser Stadium; Corvallis, OR	P12N	L 46–49	41,649
September 7	5:00 pm	Hawaii*		Reser Stadium; Corvallis, OR	P12N	W 33–14	38,179
September 14	7:00 pm	at Utah		Rice-Eccles Stadium; Salt Lake City, UT	FS1	W 51–48 ^{OT}	45,221
September 21	4:30 pm	at San Diego State*		Qualcomm Stadium; San Diego, CA	CBSSN	W 34–30	32,133
September 28	12:00 pm	Colorado		Reser Stadium; Corvallis, OR	P12N	W 44–17	44,279
October 12	7:30 pm	at Washington State		Martin Stadium; Pullman, WA	ESPNU	W 52–24	31,955
October 19	7:30 pm	at California		Memorial Stadium; Berkeley, CA	ESPN2	W 49–17	44,671
October 26	7:30 pm	No. 6 Stanford^{†}	No. 25	Reser Stadium; Corvallis, OR	ESPN	L 12–20	44,519
November 1	6:00 pm	USC		Reser Stadium; Corvallis, OR	ESPN2	L 14–31	45,379
November 16	6:30 pm	at No. 21 Arizona State		Sun Devil Stadium; Tempe, AZ	P12N	L 17–30	62,386
November 23	7:30 pm	Washington		Reser Stadium; Corvallis, OR	ESPN2	L 27–69	43,779
November 29	4:00 pm	at No. 12 Oregon		Autzen Stadium; Eugene, OR (Civil War)	FS1	L 35–36	58,330
December 24	5:00 pm	vs. Boise State*		Aloha Stadium; Honolulu (Hawaii Bowl)	ESPN	W 38–23	29,106
*Non-conference game; ^{†}Homecoming; Rankings from AP Poll released prior to the game; All times are in Pacific time

== Game summaries ==
=== Eastern Washington ===
	1	2	3	4	Total
#4 (FCS) Eagles	6	23	7	13	49
#25 Beavers	7	10	15	14	46

This was only the third time ever that an AP-ranked FBS program was beaten by an FCS program.

=== Hawaii ===
	1	2	3	4	Total
Warriors	0	14	0	0	14
Beavers	7	7	14	5	33

=== Utah ===
	1	2	3	4	OT	Total
Beavers	10	10	14	11	6	51
Utes	0	10	14	21	3	48

=== San Diego State ===
	1	2	3	4	Total
Beavers	14	0	0	20	34
Aztecs	14	10	3	3	30

=== Colorado ===
	1	2	3	4	Total
Buffaloes	3	0	0	14	17
Beavers	10	7	21	6	44

=== Washington State ===
Oregon State Beavers (4–1) at Washington State Cougars (4–2)

Quarter	1	2	3	4	Total
Oregon St	3	14	7	28	52
Washington St	3	7	14	0	24

at Martin Stadium, Pullman, Washington

- Date: October 12, 2013
- Game time: 7:30 p.m. PST
- Game weather: Overcast, 44 °F (7 °C)
- Game attendance: 31,955
- Referee: Jack Folliard
- Box Score

Game information

First quarter

- WSU – Andrew Furney 27-yard field goal, 10:49. Washington St 3–0. Drive: 12 plays, 65 yards, 4:11.
- OSU – Trevor Romaine 20-yard field goal, 0:31. Tie 3–3. Drive: 13 plays, 82 yards, 5:50.

Second quarter

- WSU – Marcus Mason 3-yard run (Andrew Furney kick), 10:32. Washington St 10–3. Drive: 12 plays, 75 yards, 4:59.
- OSU – Connor Hamlett 7-yard pass from Sean Mannion (Trevor Romaine kick), 6:55. Tie 10–10. Drive: 10 plays, 75 yards, 3:37.
- OSU – Storm Woods 3-yard run (Trevor Romaine kick), 0:44. Oregon St 17–10. Drive: 4 plays, 36 yards, 1:23.

Third quarter

- WSU – Jeremiah Laufasa 1-yard run (Andrew Furney kick), 11:08. Tie 17–17. Drive: 7 plays, 41 yards, 2:26.
- WSU – Vince Mayle 4-yard pass from Connor Halliday (Andrew Furney kick), 4:50. Washington St 24–17. Drive: 10 plays, 80 yards, 3:00.
- OSU – Kevin Cummings 7-yard pass from Sean Mannion (Trevor Romaine kick), 1:03. Tie 24–24. Drive: 11 plays, 82 yards, 3:41.

Fourth quarter

- OSU – Brandin Cooks 8-yard run (Trevor Romaine kick), 14:55. Oregon St 31–24. Drive: 2 plays, 27 yards, 0:22.
- OSU – Storm Woods 1-yard run (Trevor Romaine kick), 13:47. Oregon St 38–24. Drive: 3 plays, 45 yards, 0:52.
- OSU – Brandin Cooks 8-yard pass from Sean Mannion (Trevor Romaine kick), 10:40. Oregon St 45–24. Drive: 5 plays, 39 yards, 2:21.
- OSU – Brandin Cooks 30-yard pass from Sean Mannion (Trevor Romaine kick), 6:43. Oregon St 52–24. Drive: 7 plays, 70 yards, 3:47.

Top passers

- OSU – Sean Mannion – 34/51, 493 yards, 4 TD, INT
- WSU – Connor Halliday – 26/49, 248 yards, TD, 3 INT

Top rushers

- OSU – Brandin Cooks – 4 rushes, 34 yards, TD
- WSU – Jeremiah Laufasa – 9 rushes, 54 yards, TD

Top receivers

- OSU – Brandin Cooks – 11 receptions, 137 yards, 2 TD
- WSU – Vince Mayle – 3 receptions, 55 yards, TD

=== California ===
	1	2	3	4	Total
Beavers	14	14	14	7	49
Golden Bears	3	0	7	7	17

=== Stanford ===
	1	2	3	4	Total
#8 Cardinal	0	7	6	7	20
Beavers	0	3	6	3	12

=== USC ===
	1	2	3	4	Total
Trojans	14	7	10	0	31
Beavers	0	14	0	0	14

=== Arizona State ===
	1	2	3	4	Total
Beavers	0	3	7	7	17
#21 Sun Devils	13	7	0	10	30

=== Washington ===
	1	2	3	4	Total
Huskies	17	10	21	21	69
Beavers	0	0	0	27	27

=== Oregon ===
	1	2	3	4	Total
Beavers	0	17	3	15	35
#12 Ducks	14	3	7	12	36

=== Boise State (Hawaii Bowl) ===
	1	2	3	4	Total
Broncos	3	3	7	10	23
Beavers	17	14	7	0	38

== Rankings ==
Ranking movements Legend: ██ Increase in ranking ██ Decrease in ranking — = Not ranked RV = Received votes
	Week																
Poll	Pre	1	2	3	4	5	6	7	8	9	10	11	12	13	14	15	Final
AP	25	—	—	—	—	—	—	RV	RV	RV	—	—	—	—	—	—	—
Coaches	25	—	—	—	—	RV	RV	RV	RV	RV	RV	—	—	—	—	—	—
Harris	Not released							RV	RV	RV	RV	RV	—	—	—	—	Not released
BCS	Not released								25	—	—	—	—	—	—	—	Not released

== Roster ==
2013 Oregon State Beavers Football
Quarterbacks: 4 Sean Mannion – junior; 5 Brent VanderVeen – (redshirt) freshman; 9 Kyle Kempt – freshman; 14 Cody Vaz – senior; Running backs: 1 Chris Brown – (redshirt) freshman; 19 Jovan Stevenson – senior; 23 Damien Haskins – freshman; 24 Storm Woods – (redshirt) sophomore; 28 Terron Ward – junior; Fullbacks: 33 Tyler Anderson – junior; 42 Ricky Ortiz – (redshirt) freshman; 43 Michael Balfour – (redshirt) sophomore; 49 David Henry – freshman; Wide receivers: 2 Hunter Jarmon – sophomore; 6 Victor Bolden – freshman; 7 Brandin Cooks – junior; 8 Richard Mullaney – (redshirt) sophomore; 13 Jordan Villamin – freshman; 16 Walter Jones – freshman; 18 Malik Gilmore – (redshirt) freshman; 20 Blair Cavanaugh – (redshirt) freshman; 21 Mitch Singler – senior; 26 Stevie Coury – freshman; 34 John Carroll – freshman; 81 Micah Hatfield – senior; 84 Kevin Cummings – senior; 85 J.C. Grim – (redshirt) freshman; 86 Obum Gwatcham – junior	Tight ends: 10 Caleb Smith – sophomore; 80 Dustin Stanton – (redshirt) freshman; 82 Hayden Craig – sophomore; 83 Kellen Clute – (redshirt) sophomore; 87 Will Hopkins – freshman; 88 Tyler Perry – junior; 89 Connor Hamlett – junior; Centers: 56 Isaac Seumalo – sophomore; Offensive guards: 69 Josh Andrews – senior; 71 Grant Enger – senior; Offensive tackles: 62 Gavin Andrews – sophomore; 77 Michael Philip – senior; Offensive linemen: 50 Josh Mitchell – sophomore; 63 Justin Addie – (redshirt) sophomore; 64 Fred Lauina – freshman; 65 Roman Sapolu – junior; 66 Garrett Weinreich – (redshirt) freshman; 67 Austin Johnson – freshman; 68 Nolan Hansen – (redshirt) freshman; 70 Grant Bays – (redshirt) freshman; 73 Devan Filipe – junior; 76 Sam Curtius – freshman; 78 Sean Harlow – freshman	Defensive tackles: 54 Brandon Bennett-Jackson – (redshirt) sophomore; 74 Jalen Grimble – junior; 90 Ali'i Robins – (redshirt) sophomore; 91 Noke Tago – (redshirt) freshman; 93 Mana Rosa – senior; 96 Edwin Delva – junior; 97 John Braun – senior; 98 Siale Hautau – junior; Defensive ends: 45 Dylan Wynn – junior; 48 Jaswha James – (redshirt) sophomore; 59 Lavonte Barnett – (redshirt) sophomore; 60 Akeem Gonzales – (redshirt) sophomore; 75 Titus Failauga – freshman; 94 Devon Kell – senior; 95 Scott Crichton – junior; Linebackers: 4 D.J. Alexander – junior; 5 Michael Greer – freshman; 32 Joel Skotte – sophomore; 35 Caleb Saulo – (redshirt) freshman; 40 Michael Doctor – senior; 41 Darrell Songy – freshman; 44 Jabral Johnson – junior; 46 Rommel Mageo – (redshirt) freshman; 51 Charlie Gilmur – senior; 52 Dyllon Mafi – senior; 53 T.J. Hufanga – freshman; 55 Manase Hungalu – freshman	Cornerbacks: 2 Steven Nelson – junior; 6 Sean Martin – senior; 9 Dashon Hunt – freshman; 15 Larry Scott – (redshirt) sophomore; 16 Rashaad Reynolds – senior; 20 Chris Hayes – freshman; 22 Malcolm Marable – junior; 27 Naji Patrick – (redshirt) sophomore; 38 Charles Okonkwo – freshman; Safeties: 3 Brandon Arnold – freshman; 8 Tyrequek Zimmerman – junior; 17 Cyril Noland-Lewis – (redshirt) freshman; 18 Kendall Hill – (redshirt) freshman; 25 Ryan Murphy – junior; 29 Steven Christian – senior; 31 A.J. Hedgecock – (redshirt) freshman; 36 Zack Robinson – (redshirt) freshman; 37 Micah Audiss – (redshirt) sophomore; 39 Justin Strong – freshman; Long snappers: 57 Harrison Linsky – (redshirt) freshman; 58 Michael Morovick – junior; 72 Andrew Maughan – (redshirt) freshman; Place kickers: 1 Riley Harper – sophomore; 2 Ryan Cope – (redshirt) freshman; 12 Trevor Romaine – junior; 21 Garrett Owens – freshman; Punters: 30 Mitch Seeley – freshman; 48 Keith Kostol – junior; 99 Tim McMullen – senior
Sources: 2013 Oregon State Beaver Football Roster

== Awards ==
Junior wide receiver Brandin Cooks won the 2013 Fred Biletnikoff Award as the nation's top college receiver. He set Oregon State records for career receiving touchdowns (23), single season touchdown receptions (15), single season receptions (120) and single season yards (1,670).
