= 2013 NCAA Division I FBS football rankings =

- Season: 2013
- Bowl season: 2013–14 bowl games
- Preseason No. 1: Alabama
- End of season champions: Florida State
- Conference with most teams in final AP poll: SEC (7)

Three human polls and one formula ranking made up the 2013 NCAA Division I FBS (Football Bowl Subdivision) football rankings, in addition to various publications' preseason polls. Unlike most sports, college football's governing body, the NCAA, does not bestow a national championship title. That title is bestowed by one or more of four different polling agencies. There are two main weekly polls that begin in the preseason—the AP Poll and the Coaches Poll. Two additional polls were released midway through the season; the Harris Interactive Poll was released after the sixth week of the season, and the Bowl Championship Series (BCS) standings were released after the seventh week. The Harris Poll and Coaches Poll were factors in the BCS standings. At the end of the season, on Sunday, December 1, 2013, the BCS standings determined who played in the BCS bowl games as well as the 2014 BCS National Championship Game on January 6, 2014, at the Rose Bowl in Pasadena, California.

== Legend ==
	Increase in ranking
	Decrease in ranking
	Not ranked previous week
	Selected for BCS National Championship Game
(#–#)	Win–loss record
(Italics)	Number of first place votes
т	Tied with team above or below also with this symbol

== AP Poll ==
	Preseason Aug 17	Week 1 Sep 3	Week 2 Sep 8	Week 3 Sep 15	Week 4 Sep 22	Week 5 Sep 29	Week 6 Oct 6	Week 7 Oct 13	Week 8 Oct 20	Week 9 Oct 27	Week 10 Nov 3	Week 11 Nov 10	Week 12 Nov 17	Week 13 Nov 24	Week 14 Dec 1	Week 15 Dec 8	Week 16 (Final) Jan 7	
1.	Alabama (58)	Alabama (1–0) (58)	Alabama (1–0) (57)	Alabama (2–0) (59)	Alabama (3–0) (56)	Alabama (4–0) (55)	Alabama (5–0) (55)	Alabama (6–0) (55)	Alabama (7–0) (55)	Alabama (8–0) (55)	Alabama (8–0) (52)	Alabama (9–0) (56)	Alabama (10–0) (55)	Alabama (11–0) (56)	Florida State (12–0) (58)	Florida State (13–0) (56)	Florida State (14–0) (60)	1.
2.	Ohio State (1)	Oregon (1–0)	Oregon (2–0) (1)	Oregon (3–0) (1)	Oregon (3–0) (4)	Oregon (4–0) (5)	Oregon (5–0) (5)	Oregon (6–0) (5)	Oregon (7–0) (3)	Oregon (8–0) (3)	Oregon (8–0) (2)	Florida State (9–0) (3)	Florida State (10–0) (5)	Florida State (11–0) (4)	Ohio State (12–0)	Auburn (12–1) (4)	Auburn (12–2)	2.
3.	Oregon	Ohio State (1–0) (1)	Clemson (2–0) (1)	Clemson (2–0)	Clemson (3–0)	Clemson (4–0)	Clemson (5–0)	Clemson (6–0)	Florida State (6–0) (2)	Florida State (7–0) (2)	Florida State (8–0) (6)	Ohio State (9–0)	Baylor (9–0)	Ohio State (11–0)	Auburn (11–1) (2)	Alabama (11–1)	Michigan State (13–1)	3.
4.	Stanford	Clemson (1–0) (1)	Ohio State (2–0) (1)	Ohio State (3–0)	Ohio State (4–0)	Ohio State (5–0)	Ohio State (6–0)	Ohio State (6–0)	Ohio State (7–0)	Ohio State (8–0)	Ohio State (9–0)	Baylor (8–0)	Ohio State (10–0)	Auburn (10–1)	Alabama (11–1)	Michigan State (12–1)	South Carolina (11–2)	4.
5.	Georgia (1)	Stanford (0–0)	Stanford (1–0)	Stanford (2–0)	Stanford (3–0)	Stanford (4–0)	Stanford (5–0)	Florida State (5–0)	Missouri (7–0)	Baylor (7–0)	Baylor (7–0)	Stanford (8–1)	Oregon (9–1)	Missouri (10–1)	Missouri (11–1)	Stanford (11–2)	Missouri (12–2)	5.
6.	South Carolina	South Carolina (1–0)	Texas A&M (2–0)	LSU (3–0)	LSU (4–0)	Georgia (3–1)	Florida State (5–0)	LSU (6–1)	Baylor (6–0)	Stanford (7–1)	Stanford (7–1)	Oregon (8–1)	Auburn (10–1)	Clemson (10–1)	Oklahoma State (10–1)	Baylor (11–1)	Oklahoma (11–2)	6.
7.	Texas A&M	Texas A&M (1–0)	Louisville (2–0)	Louisville (3–0)	Louisville (4–0)	Louisville (4–0)	Georgia (4–1)	Texas A&M (5–1)	Miami (FL) (6–0)	Miami (FL) (7–0)	Auburn (8–1)	Auburn (9–1)	Clemson (9–1)	Oklahoma State (10–1)	Stanford (10–2)	Ohio State (12–1)	Alabama (11–2)	7.
8.	Clemson	Louisville (1–0)	LSU (2–0)	Florida State (2–0)	Florida State (3–0)	Florida State (4–0)	Louisville (5–0)	Louisville (6–0)	Stanford (6–1)	Auburn (7–1)	Clemson (7–1)	Clemson (8–1)	Missouri (9–1)	Stanford (9–2)	South Carolina (10–2)	South Carolina (10–2)	Clemson (11–2)	8.
9.	Louisville	LSU (1–0)	Georgia (1–1)	Georgia (1–1)	Georgia (2–1)	Texas A&M (4–1)	Texas A&M (4–1)	UCLA (5–0)	Clemson (6–1)	Clemson (7–1)	Missouri (8–1)	Missouri (9–1)	Texas A&M (8–2)	Baylor (9–1)	Baylor (10–1)	Missouri (11–2)	Oregon (11–2)	9.
10.	Florida	Florida State (1–0)	Florida State (1–0)	Texas A&M (2–1)	Texas A&M (3–1)	LSU (4–1)	LSU (5–1)	Miami (FL) (5–0)	Texas Tech (7–0)	Missouri (7–1)	LSU (7–2)	Texas A&M (8–2)	Stanford (8–2)	South Carolina (9–2)	Michigan State (11–1)	Oregon (10–2)	UCF (12–1)	10.
11.	Florida State	Georgia (0–1)	Michigan (2–0)	Oklahoma State (3–0)	Oklahoma State (3–0)	Oklahoma (4–0)	UCLA (4–0)	South Carolina (5–1)	Auburn (6–1)	LSU (7–2)	Texas A&M (7–2)	South Carolina (8–2)	Oklahoma State (9–1)	Michigan State (10–1)	Arizona State (10–2)	Oklahoma (10–2)	Stanford (11–3)	11.
12.	LSU	Florida (1–0)	Oklahoma State (2–0)	South Carolina (2–1)	South Carolina (2–1)	UCLA (3–0)	Oklahoma (5–0)	Baylor (5–0)	UCLA (5–1)	Texas A&M (6–2)	Oklahoma (7–1)	Oklahoma State (8–1)	South Carolina (8–2)	Oregon (9–2)	Oregon (10–2)	Clemson (10–2)	Ohio State (12–2)	12.
13.	Oklahoma State	Oklahoma State (1–0)	South Carolina (1–1)	UCLA (2–0)	UCLA (3–0)	South Carolina (3–1)	Miami (FL) (5–0)	Stanford (5–1)	LSU (6–2)	Oklahoma (7–1)	South Carolina (7–2)	UCLA (7–2)	Michigan State (9–1)	Arizona State (9–2)	Clemson (10–2)	Oklahoma State (10–2)	Baylor (11–2)	13.
14.	Notre Dame	Notre Dame (1–0)	Oklahoma (2–0)	Oklahoma (3–0)	Oklahoma (3–0)	Miami (FL) (4–0)	South Carolina (4–1)	Missouri (6–0)	Texas A&M (5–2)	South Carolina (6–2)	Miami (FL) (7–1)	Michigan State (8–1)	UCLA (8–2)	Wisconsin (9–2)	LSU (9–3)	LSU (9–3)	LSU (10–3)	14.
15.	Texas	Texas (1–0)	Miami (FL) (2–0)	Michigan (3–0)	Miami (FL) (3–0)	Washington (4–0)	Baylor (4–0)	Georgia (4–2)	Fresno State (6–0)	Texas Tech (7–1)	Oklahoma State (7–1)	UCF (7–1)	Fresno State (9–0)	LSU (8–3)	UCF (10–1)	UCF (11–1)	Louisville (12–1)	15.
16.	Oklahoma	Oklahoma (1–0)	UCLA (1–0)	Miami (FL) (2–0)	Washington (3–0)	Northwestern (4–0)	Washington (4–1)	Texas Tech (6–0)	Virginia Tech (6–1)	Fresno State (7–0)	UCLA (6–2)	Fresno State (9–0)	Wisconsin (8–2)	Fresno State (10–0)	Northern Illinois (12–0)	Arizona State (10–3)	UCLA (10–3)	16.
17.	Michigan	Michigan (1–0)	Northwestern (2–0)	Washington (2–0)	Northwestern (4–0)	Baylor (3–0)	Florida (4–1)	Fresno State (5–0)	Oklahoma (6–1)	UCLA (5–2)	Fresno State (8–0)	Wisconsin (7–2)	UCF (8–1)	UCF (9–1)	UCLA (9–3)	UCLA (9–3)	Oklahoma State (10–3)	17.
18.	Nebraska	UCLA (1–0)	Florida (1–1)	Northwestern (3–0)	Michigan (4–0)	Florida (3–1)	Michigan (5–0)	Oklahoma (5–1)	Louisville (6–1)	Oklahoma State (6–1)	Michigan State (8–1)	LSU (7–3)	LSU (7–3)	Northern Illinois (11–0)	Oklahoma (9–2)	Louisville (11–1)	Texas A&M (9–4)	18.
19.	Boise State	Northwestern (1–0)	Washington (1–0)	Florida (1–1)	Baylor (3–0)	Michigan (4–0)	Northwestern (4–1)	Virginia Tech (6–1)	Oklahoma State (5–1)	UCF (6–1)	UCF (6–1)	Louisville (8–1)	Arizona State (8–2)	Texas A&M (8–3)	Louisville (10–1)	Wisconsin (9–3)	USC (10–4)	19.
20.	TCU	Washington (1–0)	Wisconsin (2–0)	Baylor (2–0)	Florida (2–1)	Texas Tech (4–0)	Texas Tech (5–0)	Washington (4–2)	South Carolina (5–2)	Louisville (7–1)	Louisville (7–1)	Northern Illinois (9–0)	Northern Illinois (10–0)	Oklahoma (9–2)	Duke (10–2)	Texas A&M (8–4)	Notre Dame (9–4)	20.
21.	UCLA	Wisconsin (1–0)	Notre Dame (1–1)	Ole Miss (3–0)	Ole Miss (3–0)	Oklahoma State (3–1)	Fresno State (5–0)	Oklahoma State (4–1)	UCF (5–1)	Northern Illinois (8–0)	Wisconsin (6–2)	Arizona State (7–2)	Louisville (9–1)	Louisville (10–1)	Wisconsin (9–3)	Fresno State (11–1)	Arizona State (10–4)	21.
22.	Northwestern	Nebraska (1–0)	Baylor (2–0)	Notre Dame (2–1)	Notre Dame (3–1)	Arizona State (3–1)	Oklahoma State (4–1)	Florida (4–2)	Wisconsin (5–2)	Wisconsin (5–2)	Northern Illinois (9–0)	Oklahoma (7–2)	Oklahoma (8–2)	UCLA (8–3)	Texas A&M (8–4)	Duke (10–3)	Wisconsin (9–4)	22.
23.	Wisconsin	Baylor (1–0)	Nebraska (2–0)	Arizona State (2–0)	Wisconsin (3–1)	Fresno State (4–0)	Northern Illinois (5–0)	Northern Illinois (6–0)	Northern Illinois (7–0)	Michigan (6–1)	Arizona State (6–2)	Texas (7–2)	USC (8–3)	USC (9–3)	Texas (8–3)	Georgia (8–4)	Duke (10–4)	23.
24.	USC	TCU (0–1)	TCU (1–1)	Wisconsin (2–1)	Texas Tech (4–0)	Ole Miss (3–1)	Virginia Tech (5–1)	Auburn (5–1)	Michigan (6–1)	Michigan State (7–1)	Notre Dame (7–2)	Miami (FL) (7–2)	Ole Miss (7–3)	Duke (9–2)	Fresno State (10–1)	Northern Illinois (12–1)	Vanderbilt (9–4)	24.
25.	Oregon State	USC (1–0)	Ole Miss (2–0)	Texas Tech (3–0)	Fresno State (3–0)	Maryland (4–0)	Missouri (5–0)	Wisconsin (4–2)	Nebraska (5–1)	Arizona State (5–2)	Texas Tech (7–2)	Georgia (6–3)	Duke (8–2)	Notre Dame (8–3)	Georgia (8–4)	Notre Dame (8–4)	Washington (9–4)	25.
	Preseason Aug 17	Week 1 Sep 3	Week 2 Sep 8	Week 3 Sep 15	Week 4 Sep 22	Week 5 Sep 29	Week 6 Oct 6	Week 7 Oct 13	Week 8 Oct 20	Week 9 Oct 27	Week 10 Nov 3	Week 11 Nov 10	Week 12 Nov 17	Week 13 Nov 24	Week 14 Dec 1	Week 15 Dec 8	Week 16 (Final) Jan 7	
		Dropped: Boise State; Oregon State	Dropped: Texas; USC	Dropped: Nebraska; TCU	Dropped: Arizona State	Dropped: Notre Dame; Wisconsin	Dropped: Ole Miss; Arizona State; Maryland	Dropped: Michigan; Northwestern	Dropped: Georgia; Washington; Florida	Dropped: Virginia Tech; Nebraska	Dropped: Michigan	Dropped: Notre Dame; Texas Tech	Dropped: Texas; Miami (FL); Georgia	Dropped: Ole Miss	Dropped: USC; Notre Dame	Dropped: Texas	Dropped: Fresno State; Georgia; Northern Illinois	

== Coaches Poll ==
	Preseason Aug 2	Week 1 Sep 3	Week 2 Sep 8	Week 3 Sep 15	Week 4 Sep 22	Week 5 Sep 29	Week 6 Oct 6	Week 7 Oct 13	Week 8 Oct 20	Week 9 Oct 27	Week 10 Nov 3	Week 11 Nov 10	Week 12 Nov 17	Week 13 Nov 24	Week 14 Dec 1	Week 15 Dec 8	Week 16 (Final) Jan 7	
1.	Alabama (58)	Alabama (1–0) (58)	Alabama (1–0) (58)	Alabama (2–0) (61)	Alabama (3–0) (59)	Alabama (4–0) (59)	Alabama (5–0) (57)	Alabama (6–0) (58)	Alabama (7–0) (57)	Alabama (8–0) (56)	Alabama (8–0) (54)	Alabama (9–0) (58)	Alabama (10–0) (56)	Alabama (11–0) (56)	Florida State (12–0) (58)	Florida State (13–0) (62)	Florida State (14–0) (59)	1.
2.	Ohio State (3)	Ohio State (1–0) (3)	Oregon (2–0) (1)	Oregon (3–0) (1)	Oregon (3–0) (3)	Oregon (4–0) (2)	Oregon (5–0) (4)	Oregon (6–0) (3)	Oregon (7–0) (4)	Oregon (8–0) (6)	Oregon (8–0) (5)	Florida State (9–0) (4)	Florida State (10–0) (6)	Florida State (11–0) (6)	Ohio State (12–0) (4)	Auburn (12–1)	Auburn (12–2)	2.
3.	Oregon	Oregon (1–0)	Ohio State (2–0) (2)	Ohio State (3–0)	Ohio State (4–0)	Ohio State (5–0)	Ohio State (6–0)	Ohio State (6–0)	Florida State (6–0) (1)	Florida State (7–0)	Florida State (8–0) (3)	Ohio State (9–0)	Ohio State (10–0)	Ohio State (11–0)	Auburn (11–1)	Alabama (11–1)	Michigan State (13–1)	3.
4.	Stanford	Stanford (0–0)	Stanford (1–0)	Clemson (2–0)	Clemson (3–0)	Clemson (4–0) (1)	Clemson (5–0) (1)	Clemson (6–0) (1)	Ohio State (7–0)	Ohio State (8–0)	Ohio State (9–0)	Baylor (8–0)	Baylor (9–0)	Clemson (10–1)	Alabama (11–1)	Michigan State (12–1)	South Carolina (11–2)	4.
5.	Georgia	Clemson (1–0)	Clemson (2–0)	Stanford (2–0)	Stanford (3–0)	Stanford (4–0)	Stanford (5–0)	Florida State (5–0)	Baylor (6–0)	Baylor (7–0)	Baylor (7–0)	Stanford (8–1)	Oregon (9–1)	Auburn (10–1)	Missouri (11–1)	Baylor (11–1)	Missouri (12–2)	5.
6.	Texas A&M (1)	South Carolina (1–0)	Texas A&M (2–0) (1)	Louisville (3–0)	LSU (4–0)	Georgia (3–1)	Florida State (5–0)	Louisville (6–0)	Miami (FL) (6–0)	Miami (FL) (7–0)	Stanford (7–1)	Clemson (8–1)	Clemson (9–1)	Missouri (10–1)	Oklahoma State (10–1)	Ohio State (12–1)	Oklahoma (11–2)	6.
7.	South Carolina	Texas A&M (1–0) (1)	Louisville (2–0)	LSU (3–0)	Louisville (4–0)	Louisville (4–0)	Georgia (4–1)	Texas A&M (5–1)	Missouri (7–0)	Stanford (7–1)	Clemson (8–1)	Oregon (8–1)	Auburn (10–1)	Oklahoma State (10–1)	Baylor (10–1) т	Stanford (11–2)	Clemson (11–2)	7.
8.	Clemson	Louisville (1–0)	LSU (2–0)	Florida State (2–0)	Florida State (3–0)	Florida State (4–0)	Louisville (5–0)	LSU (6–1)	Stanford (6–1)	Clemson (7–1)	Oklahoma (7–1)	Missouri (9–1)	Missouri (9–1)	Baylor (9–1)	South Carolina (10–2) т	South Carolina (10–2)	Alabama (11–2)	8.
9.	Louisville	Florida (1–0)	Florida State (1–0)	Texas A&M (2–1)	Texas A&M (3–1)	Texas A&M (4–1)	Texas A&M (4–1)	South Carolina (5–1)	Texas Tech (7–0)	Oklahoma (7–1)	Missouri (8–1)	Auburn (9–1)	Oklahoma State (9–1)	South Carolina (9–2)	Michigan State (11–1)	Missouri (11–2)	Oregon (11–2)	9.
10.	Florida	Florida State (1–0)	Georgia (1–1)	Georgia (1–1)	Georgia (2–1)	Oklahoma (4–0)	Oklahoma (5–0)	UCLA (5–0)	Clemson (6–1)	Missouri (7–1)	Auburn (8–1)	Oklahoma State (8–1)	Texas A&M (8–2)	Stanford (9–2)	Stanford (10–2)	Oklahoma (10–2)	Ohio State (12–2) т	10.
11.	Notre Dame	LSU (1–0)	Oklahoma State (2–0)	Oklahoma State (3–0)	Oklahoma State (3–0)	LSU (4–1)	LSU (5–1)	Miami (FL) (5–0)	UCLA (5–1)	Auburn (7–1)	Oklahoma State (7–1)	Texas A&M (8–2)	South Carolina (8–2)	Michigan State (10–1)	Clemson (10–2)	Clemson (10–2)	Stanford (11–3) т	11.
12.	Florida State	Georgia (0–1)	Michigan (2–0)	Oklahoma (3–0)	Oklahoma (3–0)	South Carolina (3–1)	South Carolina (4–1)	Baylor (5–0)	Oklahoma (6–1)	Oklahoma State (6–1)	LSU (7–2)	South Carolina (8–2)	Stanford (8–2)	Oregon (9–2)	Oregon (10–2)	Oregon (10–2)	UCF (12–1)	12.
13.	LSU	Notre Dame (1–0)	Oklahoma (2–0)	South Carolina (2–1)	South Carolina (2–1)	UCLA (3–0)	UCLA (4–0)	Stanford (5–1)	Oklahoma State (5–1) т	LSU (7–2)	Texas A&M (7–2)	Louisville (8–1)	Michigan State (9–1)	Fresno State (10–0)	Arizona State (10–2)	Oklahoma State (10–2)	Baylor (11–2)	13.
14.	Oklahoma State	Oklahoma State (1–0)	South Carolina (1–1)	Michigan (3–0)	UCLA (3–0)	Miami (FL) (4–0)	Miami (FL) (5–0)	Missouri (6–0)	LSU (6–2) т	Texas A&M (6–2)	Miami (FL) (7–1)	Fresno State (9–0)	UCLA (8–2)	Wisconsin (9–2)	LSU (9–3)	LSU (9–3)	LSU (10–3)	14.
15.	Texas	Oklahoma (1–0)	Nebraska (2–0)	UCLA (2–0)	Miami (FL) (3–0)	Northwestern (4–0)	Baylor (4–0)	Texas Tech (6–0)	Texas A&M (5–2)	Texas Tech (7–1)	South Carolina (7–2)	UCLA (7–2)	Louisville (9–1)	LSU (8–3)	Oklahoma (9–2)	UCF (11–1)	Louisville (12–1)	15.
16.	Oklahoma	Texas (1–0)	Northwestern (2–0)	Northwestern (3–0)	Northwestern (4–0)	Baylor (3–0)	Michigan (5–0)	Georgia (4–2)	Louisville (6–1)	South Carolina (6–2)	Louisville (7–1)	Michigan State (8–1)	Fresno State (9–0)	Louisville (10–1)	Louisville (10–1)	Louisville (11–1)	UCLA (10–3)	16.
17.	Michigan	Michigan (1–0)	UCLA (1–0)	Miami (FL) (2–0)	Michigan (4–0)	Michigan (4–0)	Florida (4–1)	Oklahoma State (4–1)	Auburn (6–1)	Louisville (7–1)	Fresno State (8–0)	Oklahoma (7–2)	Wisconsin (8–2)	Oklahoma (9–2)	UCF (10–1)	Arizona State (10–3)	Oklahoma State (10–3)	17.
18.	Nebraska	UCLA (1–0)	Miami (FL) (2–0) т	Florida (1–1)	Baylor (3–0)	Washington (4–0)	Northwestern (4–1)	Oklahoma (5–1)	Fresno State (6–0)	Fresno State (7–0)	UCLA (6–2)	LSU (7–3)	Oklahoma (8–2)	Arizona State (9–2)	Northern Illinois (12–0)	UCLA (9–3)	Texas A&M (9–4)	18.
19.	Boise State	Nebraska (1–0)	Wisconsin (2–0) т	Baylor (2–0)	Florida (2–1)	Florida (3–1)	Washington (4–1)	Fresno State (5–0)	Virginia Tech (6–1)	UCLA (5–2)	Michigan State (8–1)	UCF (7–1)	LSU (7–3)	UCF (9–1)	UCLA (9–3)	Wisconsin (9–3)	USC (10–4)	19.
20.	TCU	Northwestern (1–0)	Florida (1–1)	Washington (2–0)	Washington (3–0)	Oklahoma State (3–1)	Oklahoma State (4–1)	Virginia Tech (6–1)	South Carolina (5–2)	Northern Illinois (8–0)	Northern Illinois (9–0)	Wisconsin (7–2)	UCF (8–1)	Northern Illinois (11–0)	Duke (10–2)	Fresno State (11–1)	Arizona State (10–4)	20.
21.	UCLA	Wisconsin (1–0)	Notre Dame (1–1)	Notre Dame (2–1)	Ole Miss (3–0)	Fresno State (4–0)	Texas Tech (5–0)	Nebraska (5–1)	Nebraska (5–1)	Michigan (6–1)	UCF (6–1)	Northern Illinois (9–0)	Northern Illinois (10–0)	Texas A&M (8–3)	Wisconsin (9–3)	Duke (10–3) т	Wisconsin (9–4)	21.
22.	Northwestern	USC (1–0)	Baylor (2–0)	Ole Miss (3–0)	Notre Dame (3–1)	Texas Tech (4–0)	Fresno State (5–0)	Florida (4–2)	Northern Illinois (7–0)	UCF (6–1)	Wisconsin (6–2)	Arizona State (7–2)	Arizona State (8–2)	UCLA (8–3)	Fresno State (10–1)	Texas A&M (8–4) т	Duke (10–4)	22.
23.	Wisconsin	Washington (1–0)	Washington (1–0)	Arizona State (2–0)	Fresno State (3–0)	Northern Illinois (4–0)	Northern Illinois (5–0)	Northern Illinois (6–0)	Michigan (6–1)	Wisconsin (5–2)	Texas Tech (7–2)	Miami (FL) (7–2)	Minnesota (8–2)	USC (9–3)	Cincinnati (9–2)	Northern Illinois (12–1)	Vanderbilt (9–4)	23.
24.	USC	Miami (FL) (1–0) т	TCU (1–1)	Michigan State (3–0)	Wisconsin (3–1)	Arizona State (3–1)	Nebraska (4–1)	Michigan (5–1)	Wisconsin (5–2)	Michigan State (7–1)	Arizona State (6–2)	Texas (7–2)	Duke (8–2)	Duke (9–2)	Texas (8–3)	Georgia (8–4)	Notre Dame (9–4)	24.
25.	Oregon State	TCU (0–1) т	Ole Miss (2–0)	Fresno State (2–0)	Texas Tech (4–0)	Nebraska (3–1)	Virginia Tech (5–1)	Washington (4–2)	UCF (5–1)	Notre Dame (6–2)	Notre Dame (7–2)	Minnesota (8–2)	USC (8–3)	Cincinnati (9–2)	Texas A&M (8–4)	Miami (FL) (9–3)	Nebraska (9–4)	25.
	Preseason Aug 2	Week 1 Sep 3	Week 2 Sep 8	Week 3 Sep 15	Week 4 Sep 22	Week 5 Sep 29	Week 6 Oct 6	Week 7 Oct 13	Week 8 Oct 20	Week 9 Oct 27	Week 10 Nov 3	Week 11 Nov 10	Week 12 Nov 17	Week 13 Nov 24	Week 14 Dec 1	Week 15 Dec 8	Week 16 (Final) Jan 7	
		Dropped: Boise State; Oregon State	Dropped: Texas; USC	Dropped: Nebraska; Wisconsin; TCU	Dropped: Arizona State; Michigan State	Dropped: Ole Miss; Notre Dame; Wisconsin	Dropped: Arizona State	Dropped: Northwestern	Dropped: Georgia; Florida; Washington	Dropped: Virginia Tech; Nebraska	Dropped: Michigan	Dropped: Notre Dame; Texas Tech	Dropped: Miami (FL); Texas	Dropped: Minnesota	Dropped: USC	Dropped: Cincinnati; Texas	Dropped: Fresno State; Northern Illinois; Georgia; Miami (FL)	

== Harris Interactive Poll ==
	Week 7 Oct 13	Week 8 Oct 20	Week 9 Oct 27	Week 10 Nov 3	Week 11 Nov 10	Week 12 Nov 17	Week 13 Nov 24	Week 14 Dec 1	Week 15 (Final) Dec 8	
1.	Alabama (6–0) (93)	Alabama (7–0) (95)	Alabama (8–0) (94)	Alabama (8–0) (95)	Alabama (9–0) (105)	Alabama (10–0) (100)	Alabama (11–0) (99)	Florida State (12–0) (97)	Florida State (13–0) (97)	1.
2.	Oregon (6–0) (10)	Oregon (7–0) (8)	Oregon (8–0) (10)	Oregon (8–0) (8)	Florida State (9–0)	Florida State (10–0) (5)	Florida State (11–0) (5)	Ohio State (12–0) (5)	Auburn (12–1) (8)	2.
3.	Clemson (6–0) (1)	Florida State (6–0) (2)	Florida State (7–0)	Florida State (8–0) (2)	Ohio State (9–0)	Ohio State (10–0)	Ohio State (11–0)	Auburn (11–1) (3)	Alabama (11–1)	3.
4.	Ohio State (6–0)	Ohio State (7–0)	Ohio State (8–0)	Ohio State (9–0)	Baylor (8–0)	Baylor (9–0)	Clemson (10–1)	Alabama (11–1)	Michigan State (12–1)	4.
5.	Florida State (5–0)	Baylor (6–0)	Baylor (7–0)	Baylor (7–0)	Stanford (8–1)	Oregon (9–1)	Auburn (10–1)	Missouri (11–1)	Stanford (11–2)	5.
6.	Louisville (6–0)	Missouri (7–0)	Stanford (7–1)	Stanford (7–1)	Oregon (8–1)	Clemson (9–1)	Missouri (10–1)	Oklahoma State (10–1)	Baylor (11–1)	6.
7.	Texas A&M (5–1)	Miami (FL) (6–0)	Miami (FL) (7–0)	Clemson (8–1)	Clemson (8–1)	Auburn (10–1)	Oklahoma State (10–1)	Stanford (10–2)	Ohio State (12–1)	7.
8.	LSU (6–1)	Stanford (6–1)	Clemson (7–1)	Missouri (8–1)	Missouri (9–1)	Missouri (9–1)	Stanford (9–2)	South Carolina (10–2)	South Carolina (10–2)	8.
9.	UCLA (5–0)	Texas Tech (7–0)	Missouri (7–1)	Auburn (8–1)	Auburn (9–1)	Oklahoma State (9–1)	Baylor (9–1)	Baylor (10–1)	Missouri (11–2)	9.
10.	Miami (FL) (5–0)	Clemson (6–1)	Oklahoma (7–1)	Oklahoma (7–1)	Texas A&M (8–2)	Texas A&M (8–2)	South Carolina (9–2)	Michigan State (11–1)	Oklahoma (10–2)	10.
11.	South Carolina (5–1)	UCLA (5–1)	Auburn (7–1)	LSU (7–2)	Oklahoma State (8–1)	Stanford (8–2)	Michigan State (10–1)	Clemson (10–2)	Clemson (10–2)	11.
12.	Stanford (5–1)	LSU (6–2)	LSU (7–2)	Texas A&M (7–2)	South Carolina (7–2)	South Carolina (8–2)	Oregon (9–2)	Oregon (10–2)	Oregon (10–2)	12.
13.	Baylor (5–0)	Texas A&M (5–2)	Texas A&M (6–2)	Miami (FL) (7–1)	Fresno State (9–0)	Michigan State (9–1)	Fresno State (10–0)	Arizona State (10–2)	Oklahoma State (10–2)	13.
14.	Missouri (6–0)	Oklahoma (6–1)	Texas Tech (7–1)	Oklahoma State (7–1)	Louisville (8–1)	Fresno State (9–0)	LSU (8–3)	LSU (9–3)	LSU (9–3)	14.
15.	Texas Tech (6–0)	Auburn (6–1)	Oklahoma State (6–1)	South Carolina (7–2)	Michigan State (8–1)	UCLA (8–2)	Wisconsin (9–2)	Northern Illinois (12–0)	UCF (11–1)	15.
16.	Georgia (4–2)	Louisville (6–1)	Louisville (7–1)	Louisville (7–1)	UCLA (7–2)	Louisville (9–1)	Arizona State (9–2)	Oklahoma (9–2)	Louisville (11–1)	16.
17.	Oklahoma (5–1)	Oklahoma State (5–1)	South Carolina (6–2)	Fresno State (8–0)	LSU (7–3)	LSU (7–3)	Northern Illinois (11–0)	Louisville (10–1)	Arizona State (10–3)	17.
18.	Fresno State (5–0)	Fresno State (6–0)	Fresno State (7–0)	Michigan State (8–1)	Northern Illinois (9–0)	Northern Illinois (10–0)	Louisville (10–1)	UCF (10–1)	UCLA (9–3)	18.
19.	Oklahoma State (4–1)	Virginia Tech (6–1)	UCLA (5–2)	UCLA (6–2)	UCF (7–1)	Wisconsin (8–2)	Oklahoma (9–2)	UCLA (9–3)	Wisconsin (9–3)	19.
20.	Virginia Tech (6–1)	South Carolina (5–2)	Northern Illinois (8–0)	Northern Illinois (9–0)	Oklahoma (7–2)	UCF (8–1)	UCF (9–1)	Duke (10–2)	Fresno State (11–1)	20.
21.	Florida (4–2)	Northern Illinois (7–0)	Michigan (6–1)	UCF (6–1)	Wisconsin (7–2)	Oklahoma (8–2)	Texas A&M (8–3)	Wisconsin (9–3)	Texas A&M (8–4)	21.
22.	Northern Illinois (6–0)	Michigan (6–1)	UCF (6–1)	Wisconsin (6–2)	Arizona State (7–2)	Arizona State (8–2)	UCLA (8–3)	Fresno State (10–1)	Northern Illinois (12–1)	22.
23.	Nebraska (5–1)	Nebraska (5–1)	Michigan State (7–1)	Texas Tech (7–2)	Miami (FL) (7–2)	USC (8–3)	USC (9–3)	Texas A&M (8–4)	Georgia (8–4)	23.
24.	Michigan (5–1)	Wisconsin (5–2)	Wisconsin (5–2)	Arizona State (6–2)	Texas (7–2)	Duke (8–2)	Duke (9–2)	Texas (8–3)	Duke (10–3)	24.
25.	Washington (4–2)	UCF (5–1)	Arizona State (5–2)	Notre Dame (7–2)	Georgia (6–3)	Minnesota (8–2)	Notre Dame (8–3)	Georgia (8–4)	Miami (FL) (9–3)	25.
	Week 7 Oct 13	Week 8 Oct 20	Week 9 Oct 27	Week 10 Nov 3	Week 11 Nov 10	Week 12 Nov 17	Week 13 Nov 24	Week 14 Dec 1	Week 15 (Final) Dec 8	
		Dropped: Georgia; Florida; Washington	Dropped: Virginia Tech; Nebraska	Dropped: Michigan	Dropped: Texas Tech; Notre Dame	Dropped: Miami (FL); Texas; Georgia	Dropped: Minnesota	Dropped: USC; Notre Dame	Dropped: Texas	

== BCS standings ==
	Week 8 Oct 20	Week 9 Oct 27	Week 10 Nov 3	Week 11 Nov 10	Week 12 Nov 17	Week 13 Nov 24	Week 14 Dec 1	Week 15 (Final) Dec 8	
1.	Alabama (7–0)	Alabama (8–0)	Alabama (8–0)	Alabama (9–0)	Alabama (10–0)	Alabama (11–0)	Florida State (12–0)	Florida State (13–0)	1.
2.	Florida State (6–0)	Oregon (8–0)	Florida State (8–0)	Florida State (9–0)	Florida State (10–0)	Florida State (11–0)	Ohio State (12–0)	Auburn (12–1)	2.
3.	Oregon (7–0)	Florida State (7–0)	Oregon (8–0)	Ohio State (9–0)	Ohio State (10–0)	Ohio State (11–0)	Auburn (11–1)	Alabama (11–1)	3.
4.	Ohio State (7–0)	Ohio State (8–0)	Ohio State (9–0)	Stanford (8–1)	Baylor (9–0)	Auburn (10–1)	Alabama (11–1)	Michigan State (12–1)	4.
5.	Missouri (7–0)	Stanford (7–1)	Stanford (7–1)	Baylor (8–0)	Oregon (9–1)	Missouri (10–1)	Missouri (11–1)	Stanford (11–2)	5.
6.	Stanford (6–1)	Baylor (7–0)	Baylor (8–0)	Oregon (8–1)	Auburn (10–1)	Clemson (10–1)	Oklahoma State (10–1)	Baylor (11–1)	6.
7.	Miami (FL) (6–0)	Miami (FL) (7–0)	Clemson (7–1)	Auburn (9–1)	Clemson (9–1)	Oklahoma State (10–1)	Stanford (10–2)	Ohio State (12–1)	7.
8.	Baylor (6–0)	Clemson (7–1)	Missouri (8–1)	Clemson (8–1)	Missouri (9–1)	Stanford (9–2)	South Carolina (10–2)	Missouri (11–2)	8.
9.	Clemson (6–1)	Missouri (7–1)	Auburn (8–1)	Missouri (9–1)	Stanford (8–2)	Baylor (9–1)	Baylor (10–1)	South Carolina (10–2)	9.
10.	Texas Tech (7–0)	Oklahoma (7–1)	Oklahoma (7–1)	South Carolina (7–2)	Oklahoma State (9–1)	South Carolina (9–2)	Michigan State (11–1)	Oregon (10–2)	10.
11.	Auburn (6–1)	Auburn (7–1)	Miami (FL) (7–1)	Texas A&M (8–2)	South Carolina (8–2)	Michigan State (10–1)	Arizona State (10–2)	Oklahoma (10–2)	11.
12.	UCLA (5–1)	Texas A&M (6–2)	South Carolina (7–2)	Oklahoma State (8–1)	Texas A&M (8–2)	Arizona State (9–2)	Oregon (10–2)	Clemson (10–2)	12.
13.	LSU (6–2)	LSU (7–2)	LSU (7–2)	UCLA (7–2)	Michigan State (9–1)	Oregon (9–2)	Clemson (10–2)	Oklahoma State (10–2)	13.
14.	Virginia Tech (6–1)	South Carolina (6–2)	Oklahoma State (7–1)	Fresno State (9–0)	UCLA (8–2)	Northern Illinois (11–0)	Northern Illinois (12–0)	Arizona State (10–3)	14.
15.	Oklahoma (6–1)	Texas Tech (7–1)	Texas A&M (7–2)	Northern Illinois (9–0)	Fresno State (9–0)	Wisconsin (9–2)	LSU (9–3)	UCF (11–1)	15.
16.	Texas A&M (5–2)	Fresno State (7–0)	Fresno State (8–0)	Michigan State (8–1)	Northern Illinois (10–0)	Fresno State (10–0)	UCF (10–1)	LSU (9–3)	16.
17.	Fresno State (6–0)	Northern Illinois (8–0)	Michigan State (8–1)	UCF (7–1)	Arizona State (8–2)	LSU (8–3)	Oklahoma (9–2)	UCLA (9–3)	17.
18.	Northern Illinois (7–0)	Oklahoma State (6–1)	Northern Illinois (9–0)	Oklahoma (7–2)	UCF (8–1)	Oklahoma (9–2)	UCLA (9–3)	Louisville (11–1)	18.
19.	Oklahoma State (5–1)	Louisville (7–1)	UCLA (6–2)	Arizona State (7–2)	Wisconsin (8–2)	UCF (9–1)	Louisville (10–1)	Wisconsin (9–3)	19.
20.	Louisville (6–1)	UCLA (5–2)	Louisville (7–1)	Louisville (8–1)	Oklahoma (8–2)	Louisville (10–1)	Duke (10–2)	Fresno State (11–1)	20.
21.	South Carolina (5–2)	Michigan (6–1)	UCF (6–1)	LSU (7–3)	Louisville (9–1)	Texas A&M (8–3)	Wisconsin (9–3)	Texas A&M (8–4)	21.
22.	Michigan (6–1)	Michigan State (7–1)	Arizona State (6–2)	Wisconsin (7–2)	LSU (7–3)	UCLA (8–3)	Georgia (8–4)	Georgia (8–4)	22.
23.	UCF (5–1)	UCF (6–1)	Notre Dame (7–2)	Miami (FL) (7–2)	USC (8–3)	USC (9–3)	Fresno State (10–1)	Northern Illinois (12–1)	23.
24.	Nebraska (5–1)	Wisconsin (5–2)	Wisconsin (6–2)	Texas (7–2)	Ole Miss (7–3)	Duke (9–2)	Texas A&M (8–4)	Duke (10–3)	24.
25.	Oregon State (6–1)	Notre Dame (6–2)	Texas Tech (7–2)	Georgia (6–3)	Minnesota (8–2)	Notre Dame (8–3)	Texas (8–3)	USC (9–4)	25.
	Week 8 Oct 20	Week 9 Oct 27	Week 10 Nov 3	Week 11 Nov 10	Week 12 Nov 17	Week 13 Nov 24	Week 14 Dec 1	Week 15 (Final) Dec 8	
		Dropped: Virginia Tech; Nebraska; Oregon State	Dropped: Michigan	Dropped: Notre Dame; Texas Tech	Dropped: Miami (FL); Texas; Georgia	Dropped: Ole Miss; Minnesota	Dropped: USC; Notre Dame	Dropped: Texas	
