= 2013 Hawaii Bowl =

2013 Sheraton Hawaii Bowl
Boise State Broncos	Oregon State Beavers
(8–4)	(6–6)
Mountain West	Pac-12
23	38
Head coach: Bob Gregory (interim)	Head coach: Mike Riley
	1	2	3	4	Total
Boise State	3	3	7	10	23
Oregon State	17	14	7	0	38
- Date: December 24, 2013
- Season: 2013
- Stadium: Aloha Stadium
- Location: Honolulu (Halawa), Hawaii
- MVP: Rashaad Reynolds (OSU)
- Favorite: Oregon State by 3
- National anthem: Tioni Tam Sing
- Referee: Gary Patterson (ACC)
- Halftime show: Amy Hanaialii and Mark Kealiʻi Hoʻomalu
- Attendance: 29,106
- Payout: US$750,000 (per team)

United States TV coverage
- Network: ESPN/ESPN Radio
- Announcers: TV: Steve Levy (play-by-play); Mark May (analyst); Lou Holtz (analyst); Maria Taylor (sideline); Radio: Kevin Winter (play-by-play); Trevor Matich (analyst)

The 2013 Sheraton Hawaii Bowl was an American college football bowl game that was played on December 24, 2013, at Aloha Stadium in Honolulu. The twelfth edition of the Hawaii Bowl, sponsored by Sheraton Hotels and Resorts, featured the Boise State Broncos from the Mountain West Conference against the Oregon State Beavers from the Pac-12 Conference. It was one of the 2013–14 bowl games that concluded the 2013 FBS football season. It began at 3:00 p.m. HST (8:00 p.m. EST) and aired on ESPN. Oregon State defeated Boise State, 38–23.

== Teams ==
Oregon State leads the series with Boise State 4–3. Last meeting, Boise State defeated OSU 37–24 in 2010. The teams have never met in a bowl game.

=== Boise State ===
Interim Head Coach is Bob Gregory after Chris Petersen decided to take over the job at Washington. Since 2000, the Broncos are the winningest football program in college 155–25 (.861), producing 38.8 points per game this year. The team, with 47 penalties this season, is ninth-nationally in fewest penalties per game (3.92) and is 18th-fewest in penalty yards per game (36.42).

=== Oregon State ===
Junior wide receiver Brandin Cooks has won the 2013 Biletnikoff Award, as the nation's top college receiver. He set OSU records for career receiving touchdowns (23), single season touchdown receptions (15), single season receptions (120) and single season yards (1,670).

== Game summary ==
=== Scoring summary ===
Scoring summary

Quarter	Time	Drive			Team	Scoring information	Score	
Quarter	Time	Plays	Yards	TOP	Team	Scoring information	Boise State	Oregon State
1	12:49	7	64	2:11	OSU	27-yard field goal by Trevor Romaine	0	3
1	8:07	12	67	4:42	BSU	24-yard field goal by Dan Goodale	3	3
1	4:15	11	75	3:52	OSU	Brandin Cooks 2-yard touchdown reception from Sean Mannion, Romaine kick good	3	10
1	2:52	4	3	1:23	OSU	Fumble recovery returned 3 yards for touchdown by Rashaad Reynolds, Romaine kick good	3	17
2	13:38	13	56	4:14	BSU	42-yard field goal by Goodale	6	17
2	7:46	6	34	2:14	OSU	Fumble recovery returned 70 yards for touchdown by Reynolds, Romaine kick good	6	24
2	2:54	8	81	3:08	OSU	Terron Ward 9-yard touchdown run, Romaine kick good	6	31
3	7:58	13	94	4:45	OSU	Storm Woods 5-yard touchdown run, Romaine kick good	6	38
3	4:32	9	76	3:26	BSU	Jay Ajayi 1-yard touchdown run, Goodale kick good	13	38
4	9:19	2	90	0:37	BSU	Matt Miller 85-yard touchdown reception from Grant Hedrick, Goodale kick good	20	38
4	2:51	13	80	3:17	BSU	33-yard field goal by Goodale	23	38
"TOP" = time of possession. For other American football terms, see Glossary of American football.							23	38

=== Statistics ===
Statistics	Boise State	Oregon State
First downs	28	22
Total offense, plays – yards	82–538	67–454
Rushes-yards (net)	38–156	33–195
Passing yards (net)	382	259
Passes, Comp-Att-Int	32–44–0	24–34–1
Time of Possession	30:14	29:46
