= Sean Mannion (American football) =

American football player and coach (born 1992)

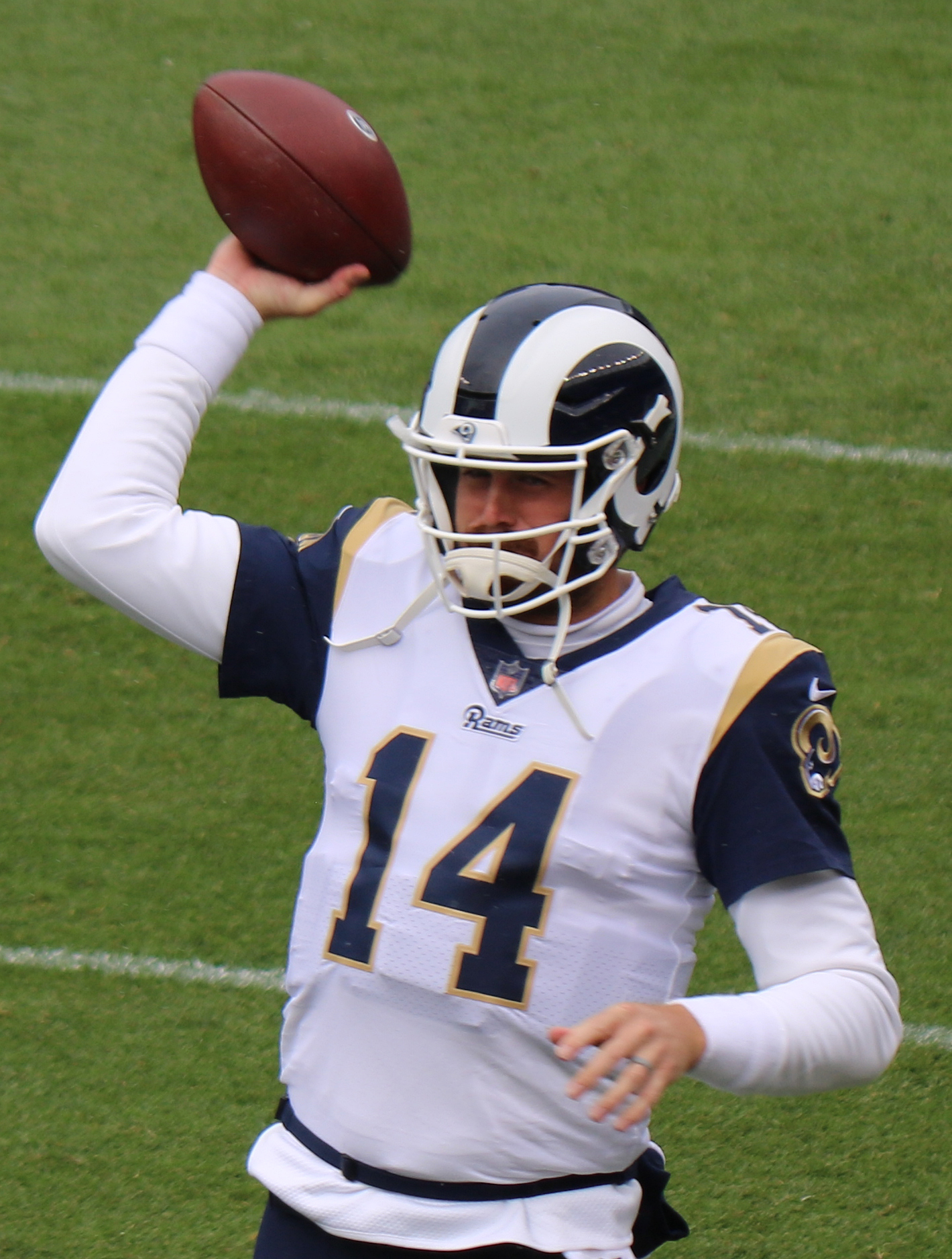
- Mannion with the Los Angeles Rams in 2018

Philadelphia Eagles
- Title: Offensive coordinator

Personal information
- Born: April 25, 1992 (age 34); San Jose, California, U.S.
- Listed height: 6 ft 6 in (1.98 m)
- Listed weight: 230 lb (104 kg)

Career information
- Position: Quarterback (No. 14, 4, 19, 15)
- High school: Foothill (Pleasanton, California)
- College: Oregon State (2010–2014)
- NFL draft: 2015: 3rd round, 89th overall pick

Career history

Playing
- St. Louis / Los Angeles Rams (2015–2018); Minnesota Vikings (2019–2020); Seattle Seahawks (2021)*; Minnesota Vikings (2021); Seattle Seahawks (2022)*; Minnesota Vikings (2023); Seattle Seahawks (2023)
- * Offseason or practice squad member only

Coaching
- Green Bay Packers (2024–2025); Offensive assistant (2024); Quarterbacks coach (2025); Philadelphia Eagles (2026–present) Offensive coordinator

Career NFL statistics
- Passing attempts: 110
- Passing completions: 67
- Completion percentage: 60.9%
- TD–INT: 1–3
- Passing yards: 573
- Passer rating: 66.2
- Stats at Pro Football Reference
- Coaching profile at Pro Football Reference

Sean Thomas Mannion (born April 25, 1992) is an American professional football coach and former quarterback who is the offensive coordinator for the Philadelphia Eagles of the National Football League (NFL). He previously served as the quarterbacks coach for the Green Bay Packers in 2025.

Mannion played college football for the Oregon State Beavers and was their starting quarterback from 2011 to 2014. He was selected by the St. Louis Rams in the third round of the 2015 NFL draft and he was also a member of the Minnesota Vikings and Seattle Seahawks.

== Early life ==
Born in San Jose, California, Mannion attended Foothill High School in Pleasanton, California. Not only did he play football, but Mannion also played on the baseball varsity team as a pitcher in his junior and senior years and he also played on the junior varsity basketball team. However, Mannion quit basketball to better pursue baseball and football. As a senior, he played in 12 games and threw for 3,521 yards and 27 touchdowns, in his first year as the starter for the varsity high school football team. Mannion came out of high school as a three-star recruit according to ESPN. On February 3, 2010, he signed with Oregon State, turning down offers from San Diego State, San Jose State, UCLA, and Washington State.

== Playing career ==
=== College ===
Mannion was redshirted as a freshman in 2010. As a redshirt freshman in 2011, he started 10 out of 12 games. He finished the season completing 305 of 473 passes for 3,328 yards, 16 touchdowns, and 18 interceptions.

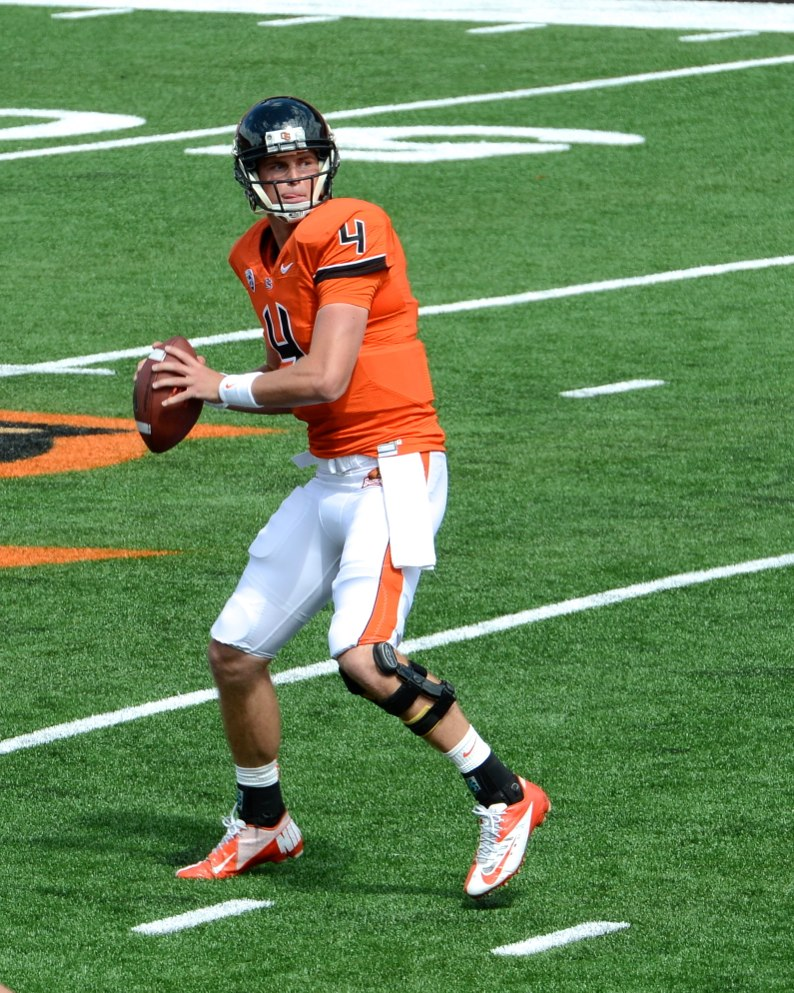
Mannion in 2012

As a sophomore in 2012, Mannion completed 200 of 309 passes for 2,446 yards, 15 touchdowns, and 13 interceptions.

Mannion remained the starter in 2013. On September 21, 2013, he threw for five touchdown passes against the Utah Utes, tying a school record held by Derek Anderson. In the next game, on September 28, Mannion threw for six touchdown passes against the Colorado Buffaloes, setting a new school record for most passing touchdowns in a game. He finished the 2013 season leading the Beavers to a 7–6 record, including a victory in the Hawaii Bowl over the Boise State Broncos on Christmas Eve. In the final game, Mannion threw for 259 yards, giving him a Pac-12 Conference-record 4,662 yards passing for the season. He finished the season with a school-record 37 passing touchdowns.

Remaining the starter as a senior in 2014, Mannion became the Beavers' all-time leader in career passing yards and passing touchdowns during the season, passing Derek Anderson's records. Later that year, Mannion became the Pac-12's all-time leader in passing yards, breaking Matt Barkley's record. He finished the season with 3,164 yards, 15 touchdowns, and eight interceptions.

For his career, Mannion started 43 games, completing 1,187 of 1,838 passes for 13,600 yards, 83 touchdowns, and 54 interceptions.

=== National Football League ===
==== Pre-draft ====
Pre-draft measurables
Height	Weight	Arm length	Hand span	Wingspan	40-yard dash	10-yard split	20-yard split	20-yard shuttle	Three-cone drill	Vertical jump	Broad jump	Wonderlic
6 ft 5 5/8 in (1.97 m)	229 lb (104 kg)	33 1/2 in (0.85 m)	9 in (0.23 m)	6 ft 8 1/2 in (2.04 m)	5.14 s	1.87 s	3.03 s	4.39 s	7.29 s	31.0 in (0.79 m)	8 ft 9 in (2.67 m)	40
All values from NFL Combine

Mannion was rated as the sixth best quarterback in the 2015 NFL draft by NFLDraftScout.com.

==== St. Louis / Los Angeles Rams ====
Mannion was selected by the St. Louis Rams in the third round, 89th overall, of the 2015 NFL draft. He started his career as the third-string quarterback behind Case Keenum and Nick Foles in his rookie year in 2015. Mannion played in his first NFL game of his career during a Week 12 matchup against the Cincinnati Bengals in which the Rams lost 31–7. He was put in the game late in the fourth quarter, in relief of Nick Foles. He completed 6 passes out of 7 attempts for 31 yards, posting an 85.1 passer rating.

Mannion started 2016 as the second-string backup quarterback behind starter Case Keenum and ahead of the first overall pick of the 2016 NFL draft, Jared Goff. In the season-opening 28–0 loss against the San Francisco 49ers, Goff took over as the second-string quarterback, demoting Mannion back as the third-string backup quarterback. Mannion was promoted to second-string for the final two weeks of the season. In Week 17, on New Year's Day, Mannion completed 3 of 6 passes for 19 yards and an interception after starter Jared Goff was subbed out of the game in a 44–6 blowout loss to the Arizona Cardinals.

Mannion started the 2017 season as the backup to Goff after Keenum went to the Minnesota Vikings during free agency. In the season opener against the Indianapolis Colts, Mannion came into the game to finish up in relief of Goff after the Rams were up 46–9 and again in Week 15 when they were up 42–7 over the Seattle Seahawks. Due to head coach Sean McVay resting most of his starters for the playoffs and having the playoff seed locked in, Mannion started the regular season finale against the 49ers. Mannion was 20-of-34 for 169 yards with no touchdowns or interceptions in the 34–13 loss.

With Goff remaining as the starter, Mannion appeared in three games in relief roles in the 2018 season. The Rams reached Super Bowl LIII, but lost 13–3 to the New England Patriots.

==== Minnesota Vikings (first stint) ====
On April 7, 2019, Mannion signed with the Vikings. Mannion made his debut with the Vikings in Week 17 against the Chicago Bears as a result of the Vikings resting their starters with a playoff berth already clinched. During the game, Mannion threw for 126 yards and two interceptions in the narrow 21–19 loss.

On March 19, 2020, Mannion re-signed with the Vikings. He did not appear in a game in 2020 as the backup to Kirk Cousins.

==== Seattle Seahawks (first stint) ====
On July 31, 2021, Mannion signed with the Seattle Seahawks. He was released on September 1.

==== Minnesota Vikings (second stint) ====
On September 2, 2021, Mannion signed with the Vikings practice squad. On September 21, 2021, Mannion was promoted to the active roster. When Vikings starter Kirk Cousins tested positive for COVID-19, Mannion was named as the starting quarterback for the Week 17 matchup against the Green Bay Packers. In the game, Mannion threw his first career touchdown pass to K. J. Osborn for 14 yards.

On March 22, 2022, Mannion re-signed with the Vikings. He was released on August 30.

==== Seattle Seahawks (second stint) ====
On September 1, 2022, Mannion was signed to the Seahawks practice squad. His practice squad contract with the team expired after the season on January 14, 2023.

==== Minnesota Vikings (third stint) ====
On October 11, 2023, the Vikings signed Mannion to their practice squad. He was released on November 28.

==== Seattle Seahawks (third stint) ====
On December 8, 2023, Mannion was signed to the Seahawks practice squad. He was promoted to the active roster on December 9, moved back to the practice squad on December 11, promoted to the active roster again on December 18, and moved back to the practice squad for the final time on December 19. His contract expired when the team's season ended on January 7, 2024.

== Career statistics ==
=== NFL ===
Year	Team	Games		Passing								Rushing			
Year	Team	GP	GS	Cmp	Att	Pct	Yds	Y/A	TD	Int	Rtg	Att	Yds	Avg	TD
2015	STL	1	0	6	7	85.7	31	4.4	0	0	85.1	0	0	0.0	0
2016	LA	1	0	3	6	50.0	19	3.2	0	1	17.4	1	−1	−1.0	0
2017	LA	5	1	22	37	59.5	185	5.0	0	0	72.5	9	−2	−0.2	0
2018	LA	3	0	2	3	66.7	23	7.7	0	0	89.6	7	−9	−1.3	0
2019	MIN	3	1	12	21	57.1	126	6.0	0	2	35.1	6	−5	−0.8	0
2020	MIN	0	0	DNP											
2021	MIN	1	1	22	36	61.1	189	5.2	1	0	84.1	2	14	7.0	1
Career		14	3	67	110	60.9	571	5.2	1	3	66.1	25	−3	−0.1	0

=== College ===
Season	Team	Passing								Rushing			
Season	Team	Cmp	Att	Pct	Yds	Y/A	TD	Int	Rtg	Att	Yds	Avg	TD
2011	Oregon State	305	473	64.5	3,328	7.0	16	18	127.1	32	−190	−5.9	1
2012	Oregon State	200	309	64.7	2,446	7.9	15	13	138.8	18	−85	−4.7	0
2013	Oregon State	400	603	66.3	4,662	7.7	37	15	146.6	34	−223	−6.6	0
2014	Oregon State	282	453	62.3	3,164	7.0	15	8	128.3	48	−306	−6.4	1
Career		1,187	1,838	64.6	13,600	7.4	83	54	135.8	132	−804	−6.1	2

== Coaching career ==
=== Green Bay Packers ===
On February 3, 2024, Mannion retired from professional football and joined the coaching staff of the Green Bay Packers as an offensive assistant working with quarterbacks and the passing game. In 2025, Mannion was promoted to quarterbacks coach after Tom Clements retired.

=== Philadelphia Eagles ===
On January 29, 2026, Mannion was hired by the Philadelphia Eagles as their offensive coordinator under head coach Nick Sirianni, replacing the fired Kevin Patullo. He was the fourth offensive coordinator hired by the Eagles in the last four seasons.

== See also ==
- List of Division I FBS passing yardage leaders
