= Sheraton Hotels and Resorts Hawaii =

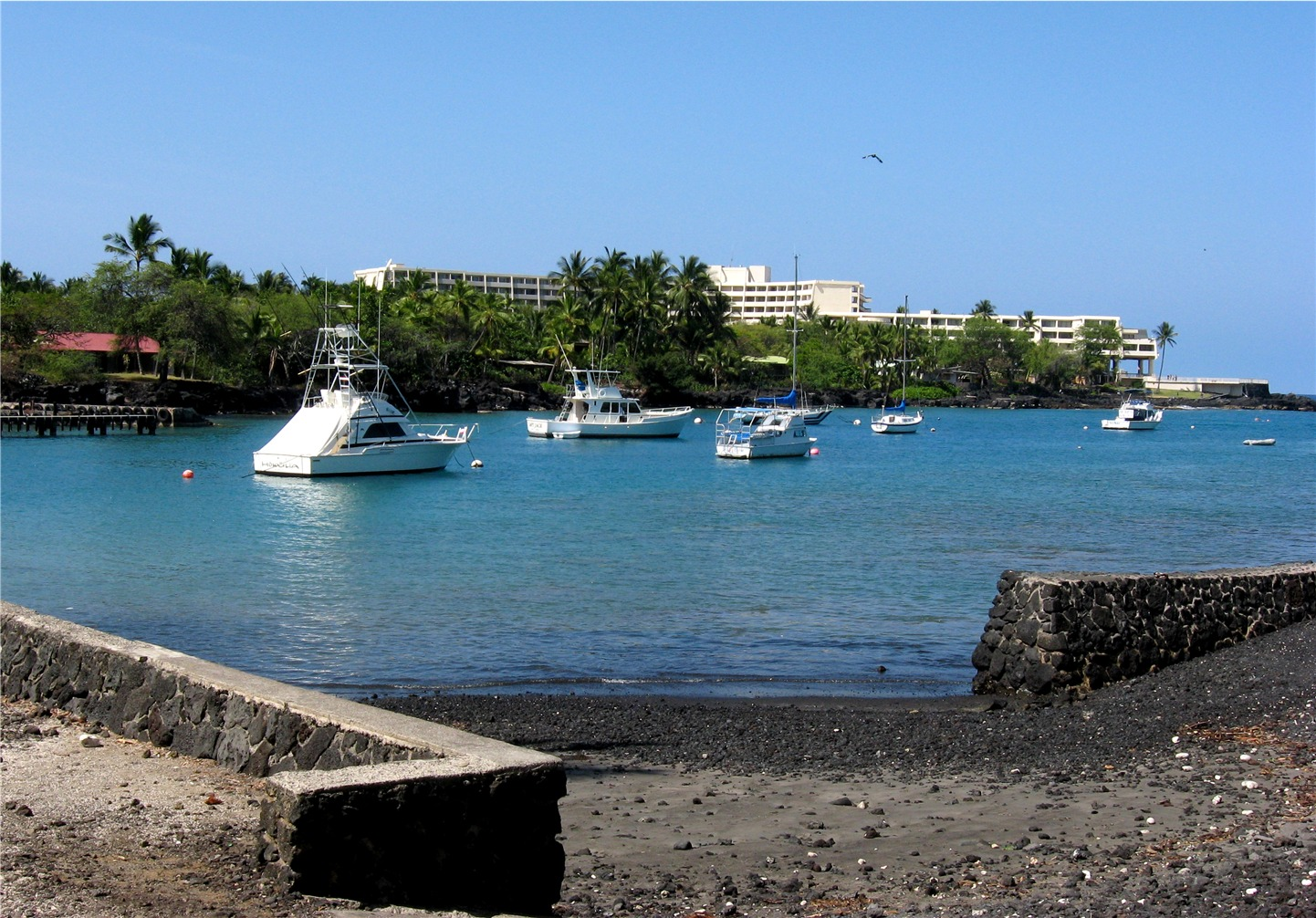

Sheraton Hotels and Resorts Hawaii was the Hawaii division of Sheraton Hotels, when it was a separate company. Sheraton is, today, a brand within the larger Marriott Hotels company. Based in Honolulu, the corporate group administered and managed Sheraton Hotels and Resorts, including those on the islands of Kauai, Oahu and Maui. The hotels and resorts in Waikiki were the Sheraton Princess Kaiulani Hotel and the Sheraton Waikiki Hotel. Sheraton Maui is at Kaanapali Beach. The Sheraton Kauai Resort was renovated after being destroyed by Hurricane Iniki on September 11, 1992.
