= 2013 Boise State Broncos football team =

American college football season

2013 Boise State Broncos football

Hawaii Bowl, L 23–38 vs. Oregon State
- Conference: Mountain West Conference
- Mountain Division
- Record: 8–5 (6–2 MW)
- Head coach: Chris Petersen (8th season; regular season); Bob Gregory (interim; bowl game)
- Offensive coordinator: Robert Prince (2nd season)
- Offensive scheme: Multiple
- Defensive coordinator: Pete Kwiatkowski (4th season)
- Base defense: 4–2–5
- Home stadium: Bronco Stadium

2013 Mountain West Conference football standings
	Conf.			Overall
Team	W		L	W		L
Mountain Division
Utah State x	7	–	1	9	–	5
Boise State	6	–	2	8	–	5
Colorado State	5	–	3	8	–	6
Wyoming	3	–	5	5	–	7
New Mexico	1	–	7	3	–	9
Air Force	0	–	8	2	–	10
West Division
Fresno State x$	7	–	1	11	–	2
San Diego State	6	–	2	8	–	5
UNLV	5	–	3	7	–	6
San Jose State	5	–	3	6	–	6
Nevada	3	–	5	4	–	8
Hawaii	0	–	8	1	–	11
Championship: Fresno State 24, Utah State 17
$ – Conference champion; x – Division champion/co-champions; Rankings from AP Poll

The 2013 Boise State Broncos football team represented Boise State University in the 2013 NCAA Division I FBS football season. The Broncos were led by eighth year head coach Chris Petersen and played their home games at Bronco Stadium. They were members of the Mountain West Conference in the Mountain Division. They finished the season 8–5, 6–2 in Mountain West play to finish in second place in the West Division. They were invited to the Hawaii Bowl where they were defeated by Oregon State. The 5 losses matched the total of losses that the Broncos had posted in the five previous seasons combined.

On December 6, it was announced that head coach Chris Petersen would resign to take the head coaching job at Washington. In eight seasons at Boise State, he posted a record of 92–12, won five conference titles and two BCS games. Assistant head coach Bob Gregory served as Boise State's interim head coach in their bowl game. On December 11, The Broncos hired former offensive coordinator and Arkansas State head coach Bryan Harsin as their permanent head coach.

== Conference shuffle ==
Boise State was originally set to join the Big East Conference, along with fellow Mountain West member San Diego State, for football in 2013; however, after the Big East announced a split between its FBS members (which eventually became the American Athletic Conference) and its non-FBS schools (which kept the Big East name), Boise State announced on December 31, 2012 that it would stay in the Mountain West Conference. San Diego State would later announce they would stay in the Mountain West as well, making the Mountain West a 12 team conference. The Mountain West formed divisions for the first time, with Boise State as part of the Mountain Division, and would conduct a conference championship game for the first time.

As part of the conditions for Boise State to stay in the conference, the Mountain West lifted the ban on the Broncos wearing their all blue uniforms at home during conference games.

== Schedule ==
Date	Time	Opponent	Rank	Site	TV	Result	Attendance
August 31	8:00 p.m.	at Washington*	No. 19	Husky Stadium; Seattle, WA	FS1	L 6–38	71,963
September 7	1:00 p.m.	UT Martin*		Bronco Stadium; Boise, ID	ESPN3	W 63–14	33,293
September 13	6:00 p.m.	Air Force		Bronco Stadium; Boise, ID	ESPN	W 42–20	36,069
September 20	7:00 p.m.	at Fresno State		Bulldog Stadium; Fresno, CA (Battle for the Milk Can)	ESPN	L 40–41	41,031
September 28	8:15 p.m.	Southern Miss*		Bronco Stadium; Boise, ID	ESPNU	W 60–7	35,356
October 12	6:00 p.m.	at Utah State		Romney Stadium; Logan, UT	CBSSN	W 34–23	25,513
October 19	6:00 p.m.	Nevada^{†}		Bronco Stadium; Boise, ID (rivalry)	CBSSN	W 34–17	35,843
October 25	6:00 p.m.	at BYU*		LaVell Edwards Stadium; Provo, UT	ESPN	L 20–37	62,954
November 2	6:00 p.m.	at Colorado State		Hughes Stadium; Fort Collins, CO	CBSSN	W 42–30	21,133
November 16	8:15 p.m.	Wyoming		Bronco Stadium; Boise, ID	ESPN2	W 48–7	33,992
November 23	8:30 p.m.	at San Diego State		Qualcomm Stadium; San Diego, CA	CBSSN	L 31–34 ^{OT}	33,161
November 30	8:15 p.m.	New Mexico		Bronco Stadium; Boise, ID	ESPN2	W 45–17	31,645
December 24	6:00 p.m.	vs. Oregon State*		Aloha Stadium; Honolulu, HI (Hawaii Bowl)	ESPN	L 23–38	29,106
*Non-conference game; ^{†}Homecoming; Rankings from AP Poll released prior to the game; All times are in Mountain time

== Game summaries ==
=== At Washington ===
	1	2	3	4	Total
No. 19 Broncos	0	3	3	0	6
Huskies	7	3	14	14	38

Uniform Combination
Helmet	Jersey	Pants

This was the second consecutive meeting between the Broncos and the Huskies as they met at the end of the 2012 season in the Maaco Bowl Las Vegas. The 32-point loss is the worst loss under Chris Petersen. The previous highest margin of defeat was 14, also coming against Washington in 2007, Petersen's second year as head coach. Prior to this game, the Broncos' previous five losses had been by a combined 11 points. It was the Broncos worst loss since a 35-point loss to Georgia to open the 2005 season. This was also the first time the Broncos failed to score a touchdown since a 58–0 loss to Washington State in 1997.

=== UT Martin ===
	1	2	3	4	Total
Skyhawks	7	0	0	7	14
Broncos	14	35	14	0	63

Uniform Combination
Helmet	Jersey	Pants

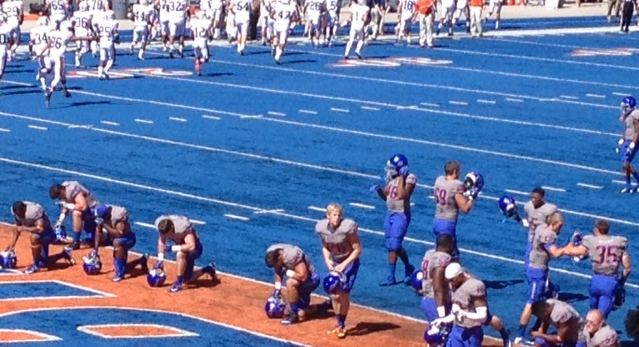
Boise State players during pregame.

=== Air Force ===
	1	2	3	4	Total
Falcons	7	10	0	3	20
Broncos	7	14	7	14	42

Uniform Combination
Helmet	Jersey	Pants

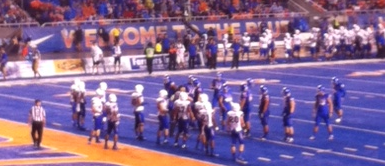
Boise State kicking an extra point in the second half.

Quarterback Joe Southwick set a Boise State and Mountain West record for completion percentage completing 27 of 29 passes (93.1%). The Broncos were allowed to wear their all blue uniforms for the first time during a home conference game since joining the Mountain West in 2011.

=== At Fresno State ===
	1	2	3	4	Total
Broncos	10	9	7	14	40
No. 25 Bulldogs	10	14	10	7	41

Uniform Combination
Helmet	Jersey	Pants

=== Southern Miss ===
	1	2	3	4	Total
Golden Eagles	0	7	0	0	7
Broncos	7	23	17	13	60

Uniform Combination
Helmet	Jersey	Pants

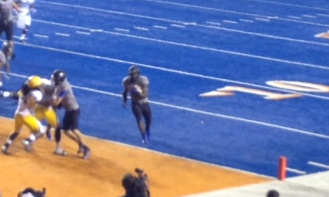
Jack Fields scoring a TD in the 4th quarter.

=== At Utah State ===
	1	2	3	4	Total
Broncos	10	14	10	0	34
Aggies	0	10	0	13	23

Uniform Combination
Helmet	Jersey	Pants

Utah State chose to wear white at home. The win was the Broncos 21st straight win over a team from Utah with the last loss coming in 1997.

=== Nevada ===
	1	2	3	4	Total
Wolf Pack	3	14	0	0	17
Broncos	0	7	20	7	34

Uniform Combination
Helmet	Jersey	Pants

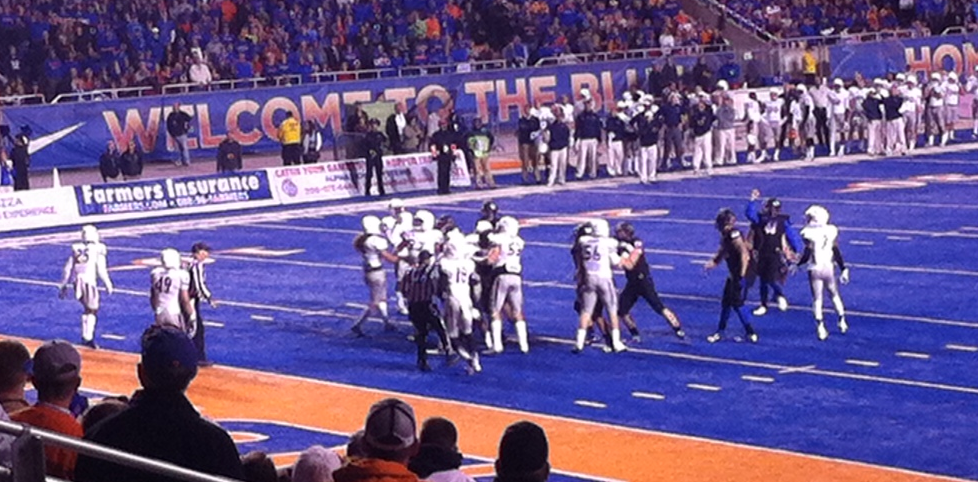
Dan Goodale kicking an extra point in the second half.

=== At BYU ===
	1	2	3	4	Total
Broncos	0	3	10	7	20
Cougars	7	17	10	3	37

Uniform Combination
Helmet	Jersey	Pants

The loss to BYU ended a 21-game winning streak against teams from the state of Utah dating back to a 1997 loss to Utah State. It was also the Broncos first loss in the month of October since a loss to Rice in 2001, a span of 50 wins.

=== At Colorado State ===
	1	2	3	4	Total
Broncos	7	21	7	7	42
Rams	10	7	0	13	30

Uniform Combination
Helmet	Jersey	Pants

=== Wyoming ===
	1	2	3	4	Total
Cowboys	7	0	0	0	7
Broncos	14	14	17	3	48

Uniform Combination
Helmet	Jersey	Pants

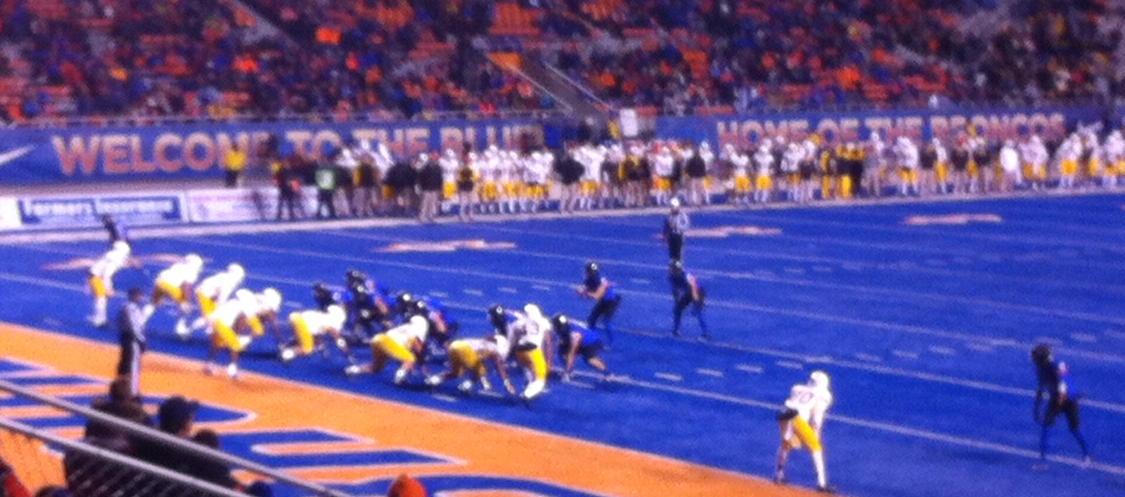
Boise State offense in the redzone in the second half. They failed to score on this drive.

=== At San Diego State ===
	1	2	3	4	OT	Total
Broncos	7	0	14	7	3	31
Aztecs	7	7	0	14	6	34

Uniform Combination
Helmet	Jersey	Pants

This loss marked the first time that Boise State lost to the same opponent in consecutive years since losing to Washington State in 2000 and 2001.

=== New Mexico ===
	1	2	3	4	Total
Lobos	7	0	3	7	17
Broncos	14	7	7	17	45

Uniform Combination
Helmet	Jersey	Pants

=== Oregon State (Hawaii Bowl) ===
	1	2	3	4	Total
Broncos	3	3	7	10	23
Beavers	17	14	7	0	38

Uniform Combination
Helmet	Jersey	Pants

== Rankings ==
Ranking movements Legend: ██ Increase in ranking ██ Decrease in ranking — = Not ranked RV = Received votes
	Week																
Poll	Pre	1	2	3	4	5	6	7	8	9	10	11	12	13	14	15	Final
AP	19	RV	RV	RV	—	—	—	—	—	—	—	—	—	—	—	—	—
Coaches	19	RV	RV	RV	—	—	—	RV	RV	—	—	—	—	—	—	—	—
Harris	Not released							—	RV	—	—	—	—	—	—	—	Not released
BCS	Not released								—	—	—	—	—	—	—	—	Not released

== Statistics ==
=== Scores by quarter ===
	1	2	3	4	OT	Total
Boise State	93	153	140	97	3	486
Opponents	87	103	44	81	6	321
