= Rashaad Reynolds =

American football player (born 1991)

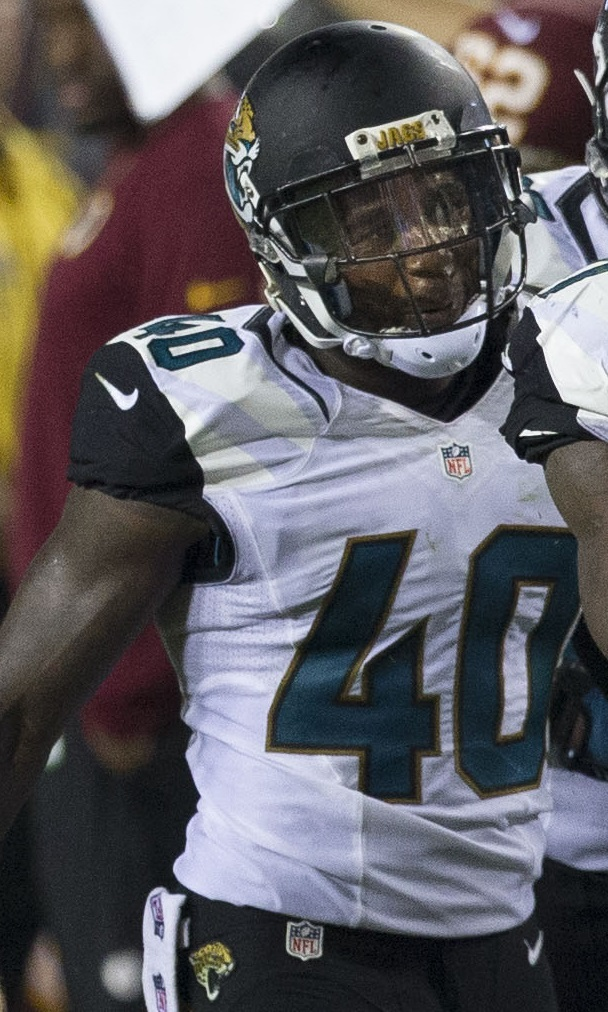
- Reynolds with the Jacksonville Jaguars

No. 40, 47, 43
- Position: Cornerback

Personal information
- Born: February 2, 1991 (age 35); Los Angeles, California, U.S.
- Listed height: 5 ft 11 in (1.80 m)
- Listed weight: 187 lb (85 kg)

Career information
- High school: San Fernando (CA)
- College: Oregon State
- NFL draft: 2014: undrafted

Career history
- Jacksonville Jaguars (2014–2015); Detroit Lions (2016)*; Chicago Bears (2016–2017)*
- * Offseason or practice squad member only

Awards and highlights
- Second-team All-Pac-12 (2013); 2013 Hawaii Bowl MVP
- Stats at Pro Football Reference

Rashaad Reynolds (born February 2, 1991) is an American former professional football player who was a cornerback in the National Football League (NFL). He played college football for the Oregon State Beavers.

== Early life ==
Reynolds attended San Fernando High School in San Fernando, California, where he played both quarterback and cornerback. He earned All-Valley Mission League three times and was twice named the league's MVP. As a senior, he threw for 1,566 yards and 13 touchdowns, and added 663 yards and eight touchdowns rushing. As a junior, he threw for approximately 1,500 yards and 15 touchdowns, and rushed 600 yards and six touchdowns. He also wrestled at San Fernando, winning the city championship four times.

He was considered a three-star recruit by Rivals.com.

== College career ==
Reynolds attended Oregon State University from 2009 to 2013. During his career he started 38 of 50 games, recording 218 tackles, 10 interceptions and one sack. In his final college game, he was the MVP of the 2013 Hawaii Bowl after returning two fumble recoveries for touchdowns.

== Professional career ==
=== Jacksonville Jaguars ===
Following the 2014 NFL draft, Reynolds was signed by the Jacksonville Jaguars as an undrafted free agent. The Jaguars placed Reynolds on injured reserve on August 29, 2014, with a broken hand.

He was released on September 4, 2015 and signed to the practice squad on September 17.

=== Detroit Lions ===
On August 10, 2016, Reynolds signed with the Detroit Lions. On August 29, 2016, Reynolds was waived by the Lions.

=== Chicago Bears ===
On December 28, 2016, Reynolds was signed to the Bears' practice squad. He signed a reserve/future contract with the Bears on January 3, 2017. He was waived on September 2, 2017.
