= San Jose State Spartans football statistical leaders =

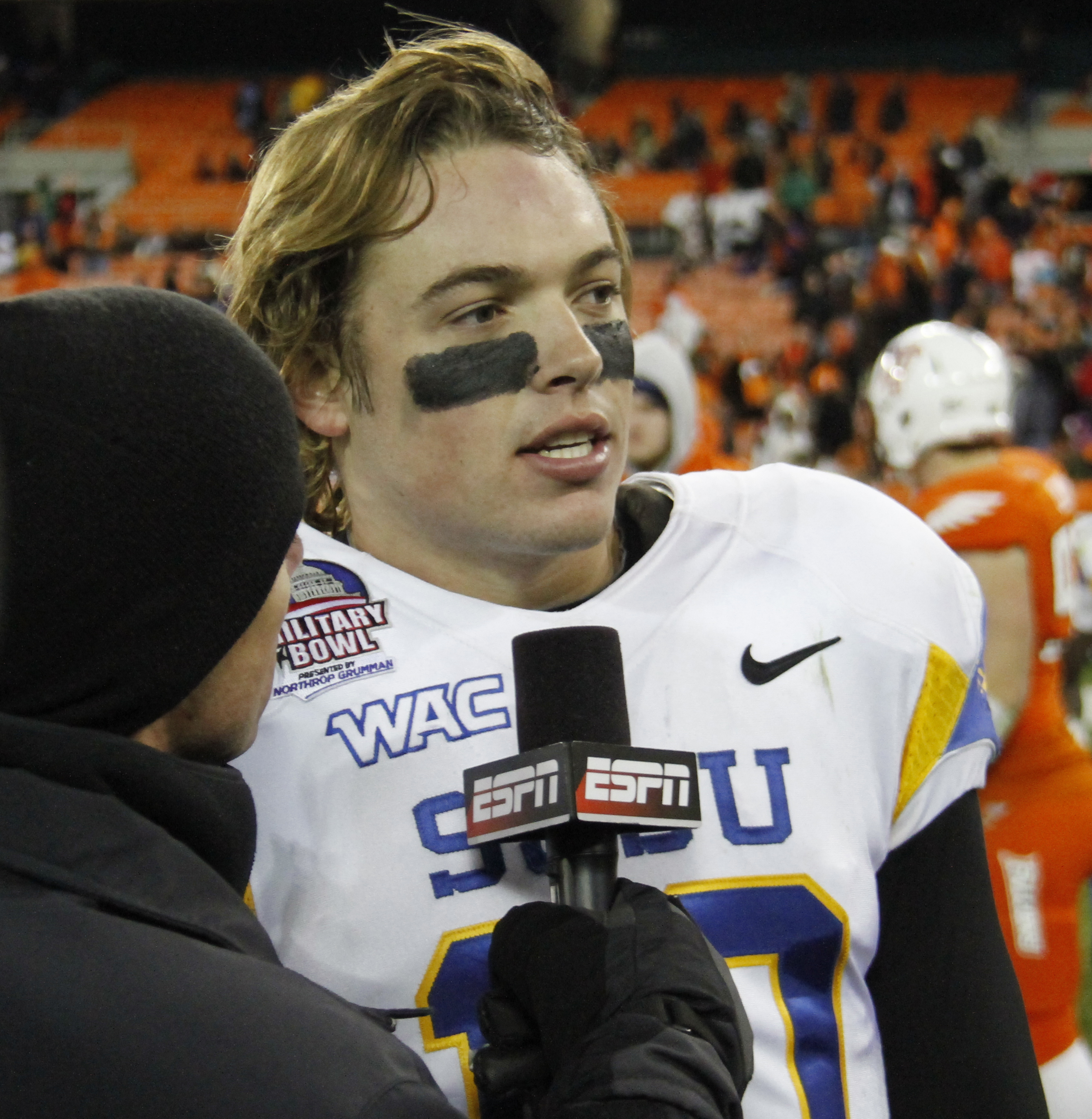
David Fales holds Spartan career and single-season records in passing yards and passing touchdowns.

The San Jose State Spartans football statistical leaders are individual statistical leaders of the San Jose State Spartans football program in various categories, including passing, rushing, receiving, total offense, defensive stats, and kicking. Within those areas, the lists identify single-game, single-season, and career leaders. The Spartans represent San Jose State University in the NCAA's Mountain West Conference (MW).

Although San Jose State began competing in intercollegiate football in 1893, the school's official record book considers the "modern era" to have begun in 1938. Records from before this year are often incomplete and inconsistent, and they are generally not included in these lists.

These lists are dominated by more recent players for several reasons:

- Since 1938, seasons have increased from 10 games to 11 and then 12 games in length.
- Additionally, San Jose State has been grouped in the same MW football division as Hawaii since divisional play began in 2013, meaning that it plays at Hawaii every other year (currently in odd-numbered years). This is relevant because the NCAA allows teams that play at Hawaii in a given season to schedule 13 regular-season games instead of the normal 12. The Spartans have played 13 regular-season games twice—in 2010, when it played at Hawaii when both were in the Western Athletic Conference, and 2015. The Spartans will again play 13 regular-season games in 2017.
- The NCAA didn't allow freshmen to play varsity football until 1972 (with the exception of the World War II years), allowing players to have four-year careers.
- Bowl games only began counting toward single-season and career statistics in 2002. The Spartans have played in three bowl games since this decision, giving many recent players an extra game to accumulate statistics.

These lists are updated through the end of the 2025 season.

== Passing ==
=== Passing yards ===
Career
Rk	Player	Yards	Years
1	David Fales	8,382	2012 2013
2	Adam Tafralis	7,548	2004 2005 2006 2007
3	Josh Love	7,206	2016 2017 2018 2019
4	Ed Luther	7,190	1976 1977 1978 1979
5	Steve Clarkson	6,842	1979 1980 1981 1982
6	Jeff Garcia	6,545	1991 1992 1993
7	Scott Rislov	6,267	2002 2003
8	Mike Perez	6,194	1986 1987
9	Craig Kimball	6,139	1972 1973 1974
10	Chevan Cordeiro	6,023	2022 2023

Single season
Rk	Player	Yards	Year
1	David Fales	4,193	2012
2	David Fales	4,189	2013
3	Josh Love	3,923	2019
4	Mike Perez	3,260	1987
5	Scott Rislov	3,251	2002
6	Chevan Cordeiro	3,250	2022
7	Matt Faulkner	3,149	2011
8	Ed Luther	3,049	1979
9	Walker Eget	3,047	2025
10	Adam Tafralis	3,022	2007

Single game
Rk	Player	Yards	Year	Opponent
1	David Fales	547	2013	Fresno State
2	Scott Rislov	543	2003	UTEP
3	Mike Perez	508	1986	Pacific
4	Jordan La Secla	496	2010	Louisiana Tech
5	David Fales	482	2013	Wyoming
6	Marcus Arroyo	476	2001	Nevada
7	Walker Eget	473	2025	Stanford
8	Scott Rislov	470	2003	Tulsa
9	Ed Luther	467	1979	Long Beach State
	Steve Clarkson	467	1981	Toledo
	David Fales	467	2012	Utah State
	Nick Starkel	467	2020	New Mexico

=== Passing touchdowns ===
Career
Rk	Player	TDs	Years
1	David Fales	66	2012 2013
2	Steve Clarkson	56	1979 1980 1981 1982
3	Adam Tafralis	52	2004 2005 2006 2007
4	Craig Kimball	50	1972 1973 1974
5	Jeff Garcia	48	1991 1992 1993
6	Ed Luther	47	1976 1977 1978 1979
7	Josh Love	43	2016 2017 2018 2019
	Chevan Cordeiro	43	2022 2023
9	Scott Rislov	40	2002 2003
10	Mike Perez	36	1986 1987

Single season
Rk	Player	TDs	Year
1	David Fales	33	2012
	David Fales	33	2013
3	Ralph Martini	23	1990
	Chevan Cordeiro	23	2022
5	Mike Perez	22	1987
	Scott Rislov	22	2002
	Josh Love	22	2019
8	Jeff Garcia	21	1993
9	Ed Luther	20	1979
	Chevan Cordeiro	20	2023

Single game
Rk	Player	TDs	Year	Opponent
1	Scott Rislov	7	2003	UTEP

== Rushing ==
=== Rushing yards ===
Career
Rk	Player	Yards	Years
1	Deonce Whitaker	3,515	1998 1999 2000 2001
2	Tyler Ervin	2,803	2011 2012 2013 2014 2015
3	Kairee Robinson	2,713	2019 2020 2021 2022 2023
4	Tyler Nevens	2,640	2017 2018 2019 2020 2021
5	Sheldon Canley	2,513	1988 1989 1990
6	Gerald Willhite	2,364	1980 1981
7	Yonus Davis	2,319	2003 2004 2005 2006 2007 2008
8	Nathan DuPree	1,976	1992 1993
9	Rick Kane	1,967	1975 1976
10	Kenny Jackson	1,935	1986 1987

Single season
Rk	Player	Yards	Year
1	Tyler Ervin	1,601	2015
2	Deonce Whitaker	1,577	2000
3	Sheldon Canley	1,248	1990
4	Nathan DuPree	1,239	1992
5	Johnny Johnson Jr.	1,219	1988
6	Gerald Willhite	1,210	1980
7	Sheldon Canley	1,201	1989
8	Kairee Robinson	1,193	2023
9	Gerald Willhite	1,154	1981
10	Kevin Cole	1,154	1978

Single game
Rk	Player	Yards	Year	Opponent
1	Tyler Ervin	300	2015	Fresno State
2	Nathan DuPree	286	1992	UNLV
3	Deonce Whitaker	278	2000	Hawaii
4	Deonce Whitaker	254	2000	Stanford
5	Sheldon Canley	253	1990	UNLV
6	Johnny Johnson Jr.	228	1988	Utah State
7	Charley Harraway	227	1965	Montana State
8	Johnny Johnson Jr.	217	1988	Washington
	De'Leon Eskridge	217	2012	Louisiana Tech
10	Kevin Cole	216	1978	Montana

=== Rushing touchdowns ===
Career
Rk	Player	TDs	Years
1	Deonce Whitaker	33	1998 1999 2000 2001
2	Kairee Robinson	31	2019 2020 2021 2022 2023
3	Kenny Jackson	25	1986 1987
	Sheldon Canley	25	1988 1989 1990
5	Johnny Johnson Sr.	21	1960 1961 1962
	Brandon Rutley	21	2008 2009 2010 2011
7	Gerald Willhite	20	1980 1981
	Jamar Julien	20	1999 2000 2001
9	Tyler Ervin	19	2011 2012 2013 2014 2015
	Johnny Johnson Jr.	19	1987 1988 1989

Single season
Rk	Player	TDs	Year
1	Kairee Robinson	18	2023
2	Tyler Ervin	16	2015
3	Johnny Johnson Jr.	15	1988
	Deonce Whitaker	15	2000
5	Sheldon Canley	13	1989
6	Kenny Jackson	12	1986
	Sheldon Canley	12	1990

Single game
Rk	Player	TDs	Year	Opponent
1	Dick Stults	4	1952	BYU
	Joe Ulm	4	1953	BYU
	Johnny Johnson Jr.	4	1988	New Mexico State
	Nathan DuPree	4	1992	Pacific
	Deonce Whitaker	4	1999	St. Mary's
	Deonce Whitaker	4	2000	UTEP
	Jamar Julien	4	2000	Nevada
	Jamar Julien	4	2001	Tulsa
	Lamar Ferguson	4	2002	Illinois

== Receiving ==
=== Receptions ===
Career
Rk	Player	Rec	Years
1	Chandler Jones	248	2010 2011 2012 2013
2	Noel Grigsby	237	2010 2011 2012 2013
3	Tre Walker	189	2017 2018 2019 2020
4	Tyler Winston	171	2013 2014 2015
5	Nick Nash	163	2019 2021 2022 2023 2024
6	Kevin Jurovich	160	2005 2006 2007 2008
7	Tim Crawley	151	2013 2014 2015 2016
8	Jabari Carr	150	2011 2012 2013
9	Guy Liggins	149	1986 1987
10	Jalal Beauchman	146	2006 2007 2008 2009

Single season
Rk	Player	Rec	Year
1	Nick Nash	104	2024
2	Noel Grigsby	89	2011
3	Danny Scudero	88	2025
4	Kevin Jurovich	85	2007
5	Edell Shepherd	83	2001
6	Noel Grigsby	82	2012
7	Chandler Jones	79	2013
	Tre Walker	79	2019
9	Tyler Winston	78	2014
10	Guy Liggins	77	1987

Single game
Rk	Player	Rec	Year	Opponent
1	Nick Nash	17	2024	Kennesaw State
2	Nick Nash	16	2024	Washington State
3	Guy Liggins	15	1986	Fresno State
	Steven Pulley	15	1999	Stanford
	Tuati Wooden	15	2003	Tulsa
6	Rick Parma	12	1978	Pacific
	Kevin Bowman	12	1984	Utah State
	Doug Hooker	12	1988	UNLV
	Kevin Evans	12	1988	Utah State
	Noel Grigsby	12	2011	Hawaii
	Tre Walker	12	2019	Arkansas
	Matthew Coleman	12	2024	South Florida
	Danny Scudero	12	2025	San Diego State

=== Receiving yards ===
Career
Rk	Player	Yards	Years
1	Noel Grigsby	3,121	2010 2011 2012 2013
2	Chandler Jones	3,087	2010 2011 2012 2013
3	Tre Walker	2,790	2017 2018 2019 2020
4	Bailey Gaither	2,227	2016 2017 2018 2019 2020
5	Stacey Bailey	2,223	1978 1979 1980 1981
6	Nick Nash	2,212	2019 2021 2022 2023 2024
7	Edell Shepherd	2,207	2000 2001
8	Guy Liggins	2,191	1986 1987
9	Kevin Jurovich	2,143	2005 2006 2007 2008
10	Tim Kearse	2,084	1980 1981 1982

Single season
Rk	Player	Yards	Year
1	Edell Shepherd	1,500	2001
2	Nick Nash	1,382	2024
3	Chandler Jones	1,356	2013
4	Noel Grigsby	1,307	2012
5	Danny Scudero	1,291	2025
6	Guy Liggins	1,208	1987
7	Kevin Jurovich	1,183	2007
8	Tre Walker	1,161	2019
9	Elijah Cooks	1,076	2022
10	Guy Liggins	983	1986
	Justin Lockhart	983	2024

Single game
Rk	Player	Yards	Year	Opponent
1	Edell Shepherd	269	2001	Nevada
2	Edell Shepherd	264	2001	Stanford
3	Steven Pulley	255	1999	Stanford
4	Kevin Jurovich	233	2007	New Mexico State
5	Nick Nash	225	2024	Kennesaw State
6	Kevin Evans	216	1988	Utah State
7	Danny Scudero	215	2025	Hawai'i
8	Tre Walker	209	2018	Utah State
9	Bailey Gaither	208	2020	New Mexico
10	Guy Liggins	203	1986	Fresno State
	Johnny Johnson Jr.	203	1989	Pacific

=== Receiving touchdowns ===
Career
Rk	Player	TDs	Years
1	Chandler Jones	29	2010 2011 2012 2013
2	Nick Nash	25	2019 2021 2022 2023 2024
3	Edell Shepherd	18	2000 2001
	Bailey Gaither	18	2016 2017 2018 2019 2020
5	Noel Grigsby	17	2010 2011 2012 2013
6	Mark Nichols	16	1979 1980
	Tim Kearse	16	1980 1981 1982
	Guy Liggins	16	1986 1987
	Oliver Newell	16	1997 1998
10	Brian Lundy	14	1992 1993 1995
	Gary Maddocks	14	1973 1974 1975 1976
	Rick Parma	14	1977 1978 1979 1980

Single season
Rk	Player	TDs	Year
1	Nick Nash	16	2024
2	Chandler Jones	15	2013
3	Edell Shepherd	14	2001
4	Oliver Newell	11	1997
5	Guy Liggins	10	1987
	James Jones	10	2006
	Elijah Cooks	10	2022
	Danny Scudero	10	2025
9	Kevin Jurovich	9	2007
	Noel Grigsby	9	2012

Single game
Rk	Player	TDs	Year	Opponent
1	Danny Scudero	4	2025	Wyoming
2	Rick Parma	3	1978	Pacific
	Mark Nichols	3	1979	Long Beach State
	Gerald Willhite	3	1981	California
	Mervyn Fernandez	3	1981	Fresno State
	Stacey Bailey	3	1981	Fresno State
	Tim Kearse	3	1982	Stanford
	Ken Taylor	3	1982	Santa Clara
	Tony Smith	3	1984	California
	Oliver Newell	3	1997	Colorado State
	Oliver Newell	3	1997	Hawaii
	Oliver Newell	3	1997	UNLV
	Edell Shepherd	3	2001	Nevada
	Courtney Anderson	3	2003	UTEP
	James Jones	3	2006	Washington
	Jalal Beauchman	3	2010	Louisiana Tech
	Chandler Jones	3	2013	Minnesota
	Chandler Jones	3	2013	Wyoming
	Chandler Jones	3	2013	Fresno State
	Elijah Cooks	3	2022	Utah State
	Nick Nash	3	2023	USC
	Nick Nash	3	2024	Kennesaw State

== Total offense ==
Total offense is the sum of passing and rushing statistics. It does not include receiving or returns.

=== Total offense yards ===
Career
Rk	Player	Yards	Years
1	David Fales	8,250	2012 2013
2	Adam Tafralis	8,111	2004 2005 2006 2007
3	Jeff Garcia	7,274	1991 1992 1993
4	Steve Clarkson	6,995	1979 1980 1981 1982
5	Ed Luther	6,981	1976 1977 1978 1979
6	Chevan Cordeiro	6,560	2022 2023
7	Scott Rislov	6,249	2002 2003
8	Mike Perez	6,182	1986 1987
9	Craig Kimball	5,820	1972 1973 1974
10	Walker Eget	5,744	2021 2022 2024 2025

Single season
Rk	Player	Yards	Year
1	David Fales	4,196	2013
2	David Fales	4,054	2012
3	Chevan Cordeiro	3,515	2022
4	Scott Rislov	3,264	2002
5	Mike Perez	3,213	1987
6	Adam Tafralis	3,203	2007
7	Walker Eget	3,147	2025
8	Matt Faulkner	3,072	2011
9	Chevan Cordeiro	3,045	2023
10	Ed Luther	2,997	1979

Single game
Rk	Player	Yards	Year	Opponent
1	David Fales	580	2013	Fresno State

=== Total touchdowns ===
Career
Rk	Player	TDs	Years
1	Steve Clarkson	68	1979 1980 1981 1982
	David Fales	68	2012 2013
3	Jeff Garcia	63	1991 1992 1993
4	Adam Tafralis	61	2004 2005 2006 2007
5	Craig Kimball	56	1972 1973 1974
6	Ed Luther	55	1976 1977 1978 1979
	Chevan Cordeiro	55	2022 2023

Single season
Rk	Player	TDs	Year
1	David Fales	35	2013
2	David Fales	33	2012

Single game
Rk	Player	TDs	Year	Opponent
1	Scott Rislov	7	2003	UTEP
	David Fales	7	2013	Fresno State

== Defense ==
=== Interceptions ===
Career
Rk	Player	Ints	Years
1	Ken Thomas	14	1979 1980 1981 1982
	Sherman Cocroft	14	1982 1983
	Gerald Jones	14	2002 2003
	Bené Benwikere	14	2010 2011 2012 2013
5	Archie Chagonjian	13	1949 1950 1951
	Troy Jensen	13	1990 1991 1992 1993
	Omarr Smith	13	1995 1996 1997 1998
	Christopher Owens	13	2005 2006 2007
	Dwight Lowery	13	2006 2007

Single season
Rk	Player	Ints	Year
1	Dwight Lowery	9	2006
2	Leroy Zimmerman	8	1939
	Don Peterson	8	1966
	Gerald Jones	8	2002

Single game
Rk	Player	Ints	Year	Opponent
1	Don Dambacher	3	1949	Mexico
	Troy Jensen	3	1993	Louisiana Tech
	Omarr Smith	3	1997	Hawaii
	Gerald Jones	3	2002	Stanford
	Josh Powell	3	2005	Idaho
	Dwight Lowery	3	2006	Cal Poly
	Bené Benwikere	3	2012	Louisiana Tech

=== Tackles ===
Career
Rk	Player	Tackles	Years
1	Dave Chaney	527	1969 1970 1971
2	Keith Smith	476	2010 2011 2012 2013
3	Kyle Harmon	443	2018 2019 2020 2021 2022
4	Matt Castelo	433	2004 2005 2006 2007
5	Carl Ekern	430	1972 1973 1974 1975
6	Bill Brown	370	1970 1971 1972
7	Josh Parry	354	1997 1998 1999 2000
8	Jordan Pollard	353	2022 2023 2024 2025
9	Ethan Aguayo	345	2016 2017 2018 2019
10	Vince Buhagiar	324	2010 2011 2012 2013 2014

Single season
Rk	Player	Tackles	Year
1	Randy Gill	232	1977
2	Dave Chaney	207	1971
3	Dave Chaney	206	1970
4	Frank Manumaleuna	175	1978
5	Matt Castelo	165	2006
6	Keith Smith	159	2013
7	Jim Singleton	144	1993
8	Carl Ekern	142	1974
9	Matt Castelo	141	2007
10	Dan Godfrey	136	1994

Single game
Rk	Player	Tackles	Year	Opponent
1	Dave Chaney	27	1971	Fresno State
	Frank Manumaleuna	27	1978	Colorado
3	Dave Chaney	26	1970	Fresno State
4	Randy Gill	25	1977	Pacific
5	Jacob Malae	24	1996	Washington
	Ezekiel Staples	24	2004	Rice
5	Randy Gill	24	1977	San Diego State
8	Dave Albright	23	1983	Cal State Fullerton

=== Sacks ===
Career
Rk	Player	Sacks	Years
1	Travis Johnson	32.0	2009 2010 2011 2012
2	Lyneil Mayo	30.0	1989 1990
3	Bob Overly	26.5	1980 1981
4	Cade Hall	25.5	2018 2019 2020 2021 2022
5	Viliami Fehoko	23.0	2018 2019 2020 2021 2022
6	Terry McDonald	21.5	1983 1984
	Jarron Gilbert	21.5	2005 2006 2007 2008
8	Rod Traylor	17.0	1980 1981
	Carl Ihenacho	17.0	2006 2007 2008 2009
10	Anthony Washington	15.5	1990 1991 1992

Single season
Rk	Player	Sacks	Year
1	Bob Overly	17.0	1981
2	Lyneil Mayo	16.5	1989
3	Lyneil Mayo	13.5	1990
4	Travis Johnson	13.0	2012
5	Rod Traylor	11.0	1980
	Terry McDonald	11.0	1984
7	Terry McDonald	10.5	1983
	Sam Kennedy	10.5	1986
9	Cade Hall	10.0	2020
10	Raymond Bowles	9.5	1991
	Jarron Gilbert	9.5	2008

Single game
Rk	Player	Sacks	Year	Opponent
1	Lyneil Mayo	4.0	1989	Stanford
	Raymond Bowles	4.0	1991	UNLV
	Travis Johnson	4.0	2011	Idaho
	Travis Johnson	4.0	2012	UC Davis
	Cade Hall	4.0	2022	Nevada

== Kicking ==
=== Field goals made ===
Career
Rk	Player	FGs	Years
1	Austin Lopez	61	2012 2013 2014 2015
2	Bryce Crawford	45	2015 2016 2017 2018
3	Matt Mercurio	44	2019 2020 2021
4	Jared Strubeck	43	2005 2006 2007 2008
5	Nick Gilliam	27	2000 2001 2002

Single season
Rk	Player	FGs	Year
1	Austin Lopez	22	2013
2	Matt Mercurio	20	2019
3	Jens Alvernik	18	2011
4	Austin Lopez	17	2012
5	Lou Rodriguez	16	1975
	Bryce Crawford	16	2016
7	Sergio Olivarez	15	1986
	Matt Mercurio	15	2021

Single game
Rk	Player	FGs	Year	Opponent
1	Jens Alvernik	4	2011	Utah State
	Austin Lopez	4	2012	Navy
	Matt Mercurio	4	2020	Boise State

=== Field goal percentage ===
Career
Rk	Player	FG%	Years
1	Matt Mercurio	81.5%	2019 2020 2021
2	Bryce Crawford	80.4%	2015 2016 2017 2018
3	Jens Alvernik	72.0%	2010 2011
4	Austin Lopez	71.8%	2012 2013 2014 2015
5	Kyler Halvorsen	68.8%	2022 2023

Single season
Rk	Player	FG%	Year
1	Austin Lopez	100.0%	2012
2	Bryce Crawford	88.9%	2016
3	Matt Mercurio	83.3%	2019
4	Bryce Crawford	82.4%	2017
5	Matt Mercurio	81.8%	2020
6	Austin Lopez	81.5%	2013
7	Matt Mercurio	78.9%	2021
8	Joe Nedney	73.7%	1992
	Bryce Crawford	73.7%	2018
10	Jens Alvernik	72.0%	2011
