= List of San Jose State Spartans in the NFL draft =

This is a list of San Jose State Spartans football players in the NFL draft.

== Key ==
B	Back	K	Kicker	NT	Nose tackle
C	Center	LB	Linebacker	FB	Fullback
DB	Defensive back	P	Punter	HB	Halfback
DE	Defensive end	QB	Quarterback	WR	Wide receiver
DT	Defensive tackle	RB	Running back	G	Guard
E	End	T	Offensive tackle	TE	Tight end

== Selections ==
Year	Round	Pick	Overall	Player	Team	Position
1940	7	8	58	Roy Zimmerman	Washington Redskins	B
1941	14	10	130	Deward Tornell	Washington Redskins	B
1941	15	10	140	Morris Buckingham	Washington Redskins	C
1946	20	9	189	Bob Ward	Washington Redskins	B
1947	3	10	23	Frank Minini	Chicago Bears	B
1949	15	1	142	Bob Pifferini	Detroit Lions	C
1950	11	10	141	Harley Dow	San Francisco 49ers	T
1950	15	7	190	Harry Russell	Pittsburgh Steelers	B
1950	22	9	283	Billy Wilson	San Francisco 49ers	E
1950	28	11	363	Junior Morgan	Los Angeles Rams	E
1951	26	3	306	Keith Carpenter	San Francisco 49ers	T
1953	12	9	142	George Porter	Philadelphia Eagles	T
1953	18	7	212	Stan Wacholz	San Francisco 49ers	E
1954	5	8	57	Charlie Allen	Los Angeles Rams	T
1955	10	2	111	Tom Louderback	Washington Redskins	G
1955	24	7	284	Matt Vujevich	New York Giants	B
1956	21	5	246	Jack Adams	Philadelphia Eagles	T
1956	22	3	256	Clarence Wessman	San Francisco 49ers	E
1956	24	12	289	Jim Hughes	Cleveland Browns	G
1956	30	3	352	Joe Ulm	Philadelphia Eagles	B
1957	10	5	114	Bob Reinhart	Cleveland Browns	B
1958	12	12	145	Hal Boutte	Detroit Lions	E
1958	25	7	296	Bill Atkins	Los Angeles Rams	T
1959	7	6	78	Daniel Colchico	San Francisco 49ers	E
1959	11	3	123	Art Powell	Philadelphia Eagles	WR
1960	4	10	46	Ray Norton	San Francisco 49ers	B
1961	9	6	118	Leon Donohue	San Francisco 49ers	T
1961	20	5	271	Mike Jones	Pittsburgh Steelers	QB
1961	21	4	164	Mike Jones	Oakland Raiders	QB
1961	27	4	212	Clair Appledoorn	Oakland Raiders	E
1962	4	8	32	Mac Burton	San Diego Chargers	E
1962	4	7	49	Jim Cadile	Chicago Bears	T
1962	5	1	57	Mac Burton	Chicago Bears	E
1962	6	9	79	John Sutro	Green Bay Packers	T
1962	6	14	84	Oscar Donahue	Green Bay Packers	E
1962	12	6	94	Oscar Donahue	Oakland Raiders	E
1962	20	1	153	John Sutro	Oakland Raiders	T
1962	22	1	169	Jim Cadile	Oakland Raiders	T
1962	29	1	225	Leon Donahue	Oakland Raiders	T
1965	4	14	56	Dave Johnson	Baltimore Colts	WR
1965	5	12	68	Bob Bonds	St. Louis Cardinals	RB
1965	13	5	101	Bob Bonds	Kansas City Chiefs	RB
1965	13	9	177	Brent Berry	Los Angeles Rams	T
1966	3	13	45	Fred Heron	Green Bay Packers	T
1966	6	9	89	Mel Tom	Philadelphia Eagles	LB
1966	14	6	124	Charley Harraway	Kansas City Chiefs	RB
1966	15	7	222	Saint Saffold	San Francisco 49ers	WR
1966	18	8	162	John Travis	San Diego Chargers	FB
1966	18	13	273	Charley Harraway	Cleveland Browns	RB
1967	9	15	226	Tommie Smith	Los Angeles Rams	RB
1967	12	7	297	Eric Watts	Detroit Lions	DB
1967	14	14	355	Martin Baccaglio	San Diego Chargers	DT
1968	6	10	148	Mike Spitzer	Detroit Lions	DE
1968	8	9	201	Danny Holman	Pittsburgh Steelers	QB
1968	16	2	410	Roy Hall	Atlanta Falcons	T
1968	16	24	432	Walt Blackledge	Baltimore Colts	WR
1969	5	4	108	Walter Shockley	St. Louis Cardinals	RB
1969	9	1	209	Steve Alexakos	Boston Patriots	G
1970	15	7	371	John Carlos	Philadelphia Eagles	WR
1972	14	22	360	David Chaney	Kansas City Chiefs	LB
1972	16	10	400	Eric Dahl	New England Patriots	DB
1973	5	25	129	Cody Jones	Los Angeles Rams	DE
1974	13	12	324	Emanuel Armstrong	Green Bay Packers	LB
1974	17	2	418	Charles DeJurnett	San Diego Chargers	DT
1975	1	17	17	Louie Wright	Denver Broncos	DB
1975	6	9	139	Dave Wasick	Kansas City Chiefs	LB
1975	11	24	284	Ike McBee	San Diego Chargers	WR
1976	1	19	19	Kim Bokamper	Miami Dolphins	DE
1976	5	4	128	Carl Ekern	Los Angeles Rams	LB
1976	17	14	473	Darryl Jenkins	San Francisco 49ers	RB
1977	1	20	20	Wilson Faumuina	Atlanta Falcons	DT
1977	3	13	69	Rick Kane	Detroit Lions	RB
1977	10	19	270	Jim LeJay	St. Louis Cardinals	WR
1977	10	24	275	Steve DeBerg	Dallas Cowboys	QB
1977	11	6	285	John Blain	New Orleans Saints	T
1978	4	9	93	Gerald Small	Miami Dolphins	DB
1978	10	15	265	Randy Gill	St. Louis Cardinals	LB
1979	4	3	85	Frank Manumaleuga	Kansas City Chiefs	LB
1980	3	2	58	Jewerl Thomas	Los Angeles Rams	RB
1980	4	18	101	Ed Luther	San Diego Chargers	QB
1981	1	16	16	Mark Nichols	Detroit Lions	WR
1982	1	21	21	Gerald Willhite	Denver Broncos	RB
1982	3	8	63	Stacey Bailey	Atlanta Falcons	WR
1983	1	22	22	Gill Byrd	San Diego Chargers	DB
1983	7	5	173	Ken Thomas	Kansas City Chiefs	RB
1983	9	4	228	Brian Hawkins	Denver Broncos	DB
1983	10	26	277	Mervyn Fernandez	Los Angeles Raiders	WR
1983	11	24	303	Tim Kearse	San Diego Chargers	WR
1984	2	13	41	Eric Richardson	Buffalo Bills	WR
1984	11	5	285	Bobby Johnson	Kansas City Chiefs	RB
1985	5	22	134	Tony Smith	New York Jets	WR
1988	6	2	139	James Saxon	Kansas City Chiefs	RB
1988	7	10	175	Mike Perez	New York Giants	QB
1989	6	11	150	Jay Taylor	Phoenix Cardinals	DB
1990	7	4	169	Johnny Johnson	Phoenix Cardinals	RB
1990	12	14	318	Tony Jeffery	Kansas City Chiefs	WR
1991	7	26	193	Sheldon Canley	San Francisco 49ers	RB
1996	3	20	81	Brian Roche	San Diego Chargers	TE
1999	3	29	90	David Loverne	New York Jets	G
1999	6	20	189	Lyle West	New York Giants	DB
2001	3	4	66	Sean Brewer	Cincinnati Bengals	TE
2003	6	36	209	Tim Provost	Miami Dolphins	T
2004	7	44	245	Courtney Anderson	Oakland Raiders	TE
2007	3	14	78	James Jones	Green Bay Packers	WR
2007	7	19	229	John Broussard	Jacksonville Jaguars	WR
2008	4	14	113	Dwight Lowery	New York Jets	DB
2009	3	4	68	Jarron Gilbert	Chicago Bears	DE
2009	3	26	90	Chris Owens	Atlanta Falcons	DB
2009	6	18	191	Coye Francies	Cleveland Browns	DB
2013	6	8	176	David Quessenberry	Houston Texans	T
2014	5	8	148	Bené Benwikere	Carolina Panthers	DB
2014	6	7	183	David Fales	Chicago Bears	QB
2015	7	32	249	Akeem King	Atlanta Falcons	DB
2016	4	21	119	Tyler Ervin	Houston Texans	RB
2016	6	20	195	Wes Schweitzer	Atlanta Falcons	G
2018	7	4	222	Jermaine Kelly	Houston Texans	DB
2019	3	5	69	Josh Oliver	Jacksonville Jaguars	TE
2023	4	27	129	Viliami Fehoko	Dallas Cowboys	DE
