= Fale =

Fale may refer to:

== People ==
- Anatólio Falé (1913–1980), Portuguese professor of music, musician and composer
- Bad Luck Fale (born 1982), Tongan-New Zealand professional wrestler
- Carlos Falé (born 1933), Portuguese former footballer
- Erwan Kepoa Falé (born 1991/1992), French actor
- Richard Fale (born 1981), American politician
- Thomas Fale (fl. 1604), English mathematician
- Tualau Fale (born 1960), Tongan boxer
- Fale Burman (1903–1973), Swedish Army lieutenant general
- Fale, a clan or subgroup of the Matbat ethnic group - see List of ethnic groups of West Papua

== Other uses ==
- Fale, a house or building in the architecture of Samoa and Polynesia more broadly
  - Beach fale, beach hut in Samoa
- Fale, Tokelau, an islet and a village of Tokelau
- Fale, Tuvalu, an islet of Tuvalu
- FALE, the ICAO code for King Shaka International Airport in Durban, South Africa

== See also ==
- Fail (disambiguation)
- Fales, a surname
