= Fail (disambiguation) =

To fail is not to meet a desirable or intended objective. Fail may also refer to:

== Places ==
- Lia Fáil, the coronation stone for the kings of Ireland, and source of the Inis Fáil name for Ireland
- Fail, Viseu, a parish in Portugal
- Fail Monastery, in Scotland
- Fail Loch, a former lake near the monastery

== People ==
- James M. Fail (1926–2010), American financial executive
- Noël du Fail (c.1520–1591), Breton jurist and writer
- Stan Fail (1936–2025), American Olympic speed skater
- Fail Alsynov (1986–), Bashkir activist

== Other uses ==
- "Fail", a song on Depeche Mode's 2017 album Spirit

== See also ==
- Fianna Fáil, an Irish political party
- Fayl, a village in eastern Yemen
- Fale (disambiguation)
- Failure (disambiguation)
- Failer, 2003 album by Kathleen Edwards
