= Failure (disambiguation) =

Failure is not meeting a desirable or intended objective.

Failure may also refer to:

== Art and entertainment ==
=== Music ===
- Failure (King Missile album), 1998
- Failure (The Posies album), 1988
- Failure (Assemblage 23 album), 2001
- Failure (Outbreak album), 2006
- Failure (band), a 1990s rock band
- "Failure", a 1997 song by Lagwagon from Double Plaidinum
- "Failure", a 2001 song by Kings of Convenience from Quiet Is the New Loud
- "Failure" (Sevendust song), a 2006 song by the alternative metal band Sevendust
- "Failure", a 2011 song by Juliana Hatfield from the album There's Always Another Girl
- "Failure", a 2013 song by Red Fang from the album Whales and Leeches
- "Failure" (Breaking Benjamin song), a 2015 song by the rock band Breaking Benjamin
- "Failure", a 2017 song by NEFFEX
- "Failure", a 1991 song by Swans from the album White Light from the Mouth of Infinity

=== Other media ===
- The Failure, a 1913 novel by Giovanni Papini
- Failure Magazine, a magazine started in 2000
- The Failure (1915 film), a silent American film
- The Failure (1917 film), a silent British film

== Other uses ==
- Structural failure, a material stressed to its strength limit
- In pattern matching, failure is when a (sub)pattern does not match a string
- Failure rate
- Market failure

== See also ==
- Failer, a 2003 album by Kathleen Edwards
- Fail (disambiguation)
