= Marcus Arroyo =

American football player and coach (born 1980)

Current position
- Title: Offensive coordinator/Quarterbacks coach
- Team: Arizona State
- Conference: Big 12

Biographical details
- Born: January 23, 1980 (age 46); Sacramento, California, U.S.

Playing career
- 1998–2002: San Jose State
- Position: Quarterback

Coaching career (HC unless noted)
- 2003: San Jose State (UA)
- 2004: Prairie View A&M (OC)
- 2005: San Jose State (GA)
- 2006: San Jose State (QB)
- 2007–2008: San Jose State (co-OC/QB)
- 2009–2010: Wyoming (OC/QB)
- 2011: California (QB)
- 2012: California (PGC/QB)
- 2013: Southern Miss (OC/WR)
- 2014: Tampa Bay Buccaneers (QB)
- 2015–2016: Oklahoma State (RB)
- 2017: Oregon (co-OC/QB/TE)
- 2018: Oregon (OC/QB/TE)
- 2019: Oregon (AHC/OC/QB)
- 2020–2022: UNLV
- 2024–present: Arizona State (OC/QB)

Head coaching record
- Overall: 7–23

Marcus Cole Arroyo (born January 23, 1980) is an American college football coach and former player. He is the offensive coordinator and quarterback coach at Arizona State. He served as the head football coach at the University of Nevada, Las Vegas (UNLV) from 2020 to 2022. Arroyo played as quarterback at San Jose State University.

== Playing career ==
After graduating from Colfax High School in Colfax, California, Arroyo was the starting quarterback for the San Jose State Spartans from 1998 to 2002. He set many school records for passing, some of which are still unsurpassed. To this day, Arroyo ranks eighth in passing yards (4,603), ninth in completions (348) and total offense (4,525 yards), and tenth in passing efficiency (115.6). He still holds the school records for single-game passing efficiency and average yards per completion. Arroyo played in the NCAA Division I record-setting game against Nevada in 2001, where he threw five touchdowns and the teams put up the score 64–45, which set the record for most total offense in a single game. Arroyo was the main starter for the Spartans until Scott Rislov took the job in 2002. Arroyo graduated from San Jose State in 2003 with a degree in kinesiology.

== Coaching career ==
Following his playing career, Arroyo took a coaching position with San Jose State as an undergraduate assistant coach in 2003. The next year, he went to Prairie View A&M University where he served as the offensive coordinator. After one season in this capacity, Arroyo returned to San Jose State as a graduate assistant coach under newly hired head coach Dick Tomey. He was promoted to a full-time position in 2006, becoming the Spartans quarterbacks coach. Arroyo added co-offensive coordinator duties in 2007. During his tenure he worked with quarterbacks Adam Tafralis and Kyle Reed. After the 2008 season concluded, Arroyo accepted the position of offensive coordinator and quarterbacks coach at the University of Wyoming. He joined the University of California, Berkeley as quarterbacks coach in February 2011, adding the title of passing game coordinator prior to the 2012 season. In January 2013, Arroyo was hired by head coach Todd Monken as the offensive coordinator and outside receivers coach at Southern Miss.

In January 2014, Arroyo was hired by head coach Lovie Smith to coach quarterbacks with the Tampa Bay Buccaneers. Before the start of the regular season, offensive coordinator Jeff Tedford left the team due to medical issues. Arroyo then took over the offensive coordinator duties. Arroyo left Tampa Bay in January 2015 and joined the Oklahoma State University football coaching staff in February 2015 as the running back coach. Marcus was co–offensive coordinator with Mario Cristobal for the Oregon Ducks in 2017 under head coach Willie Taggart. He took over full offensive coordinator and play calling duties starting with the Las Vegas Bowl on December 16, 2017 under head coach Mario Cristobal. In the 2019, Oregon went 11-2 during the regular season, winning the North division, beating Utah in the PAC-12 Conference Championship Game. Oregon would finish the post season with a Rose Bowl victory over the Wisconsin Badgers. This was Arroyo's last game with Oregon before taking over head coaching duties at UNLV.

=== UNLV ===
On December 11, 2019, Arroyo was announced as the new head coach of the UNLV Rebels football program. In his first season as a head coach, he led the Rebels to an 0-6 record. Arroyo remained head coach through 2022, posting a record of 7–23. On November 28, 2022, UNLV fired Arroyo from the head coach position.

=== Arizona State ===
On December 3, 2023, Arroyo was announced as the new offensive coordinator and quarterback coach at Arizona State replacing Beau Baldwin.

== Personal life ==
Born in Sacramento, Arroyo grew up in Meadow Vista, California. He is married and has two children.

== Head coaching record ==
Year	Team	Overall	Conference	Standing	Bowl/playoffs
UNLV Rebels (Mountain West Conference) (2020–2022)
2020	UNLV	0–6	0–6	12th	
2021	UNLV	2–10	2–6	6th (West)	
2022	UNLV	5–7	3–5	4th (West)	
UNLV:		7–23	5–17		
Total:		7–23			
