= David Fales =

American football player (born 1990)

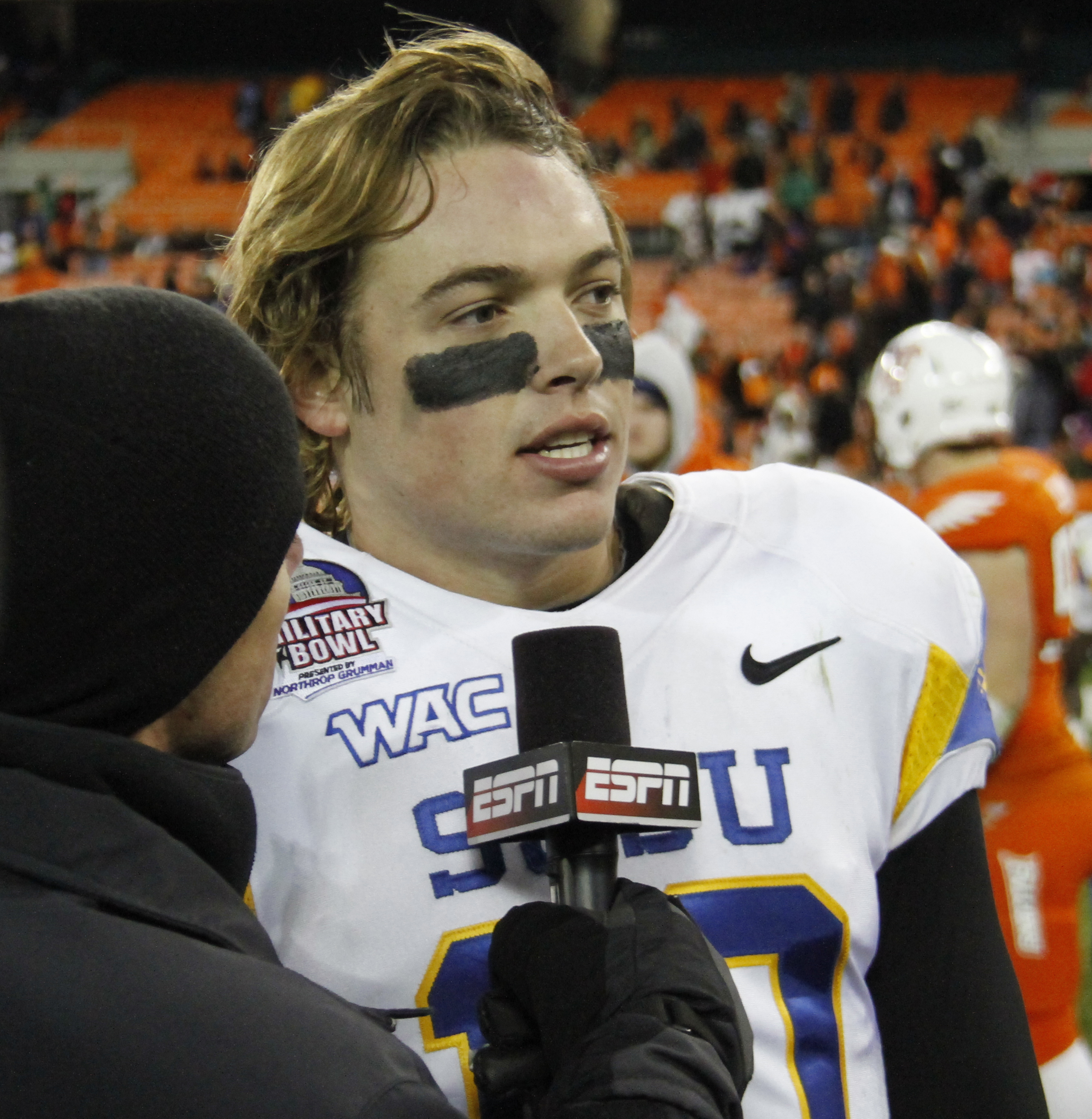
- Fales after the 2012 Military Bowl

No. 9, 3
- Position: Quarterback

Personal information
- Born: October 4, 1990 (age 36); Salinas, California, U.S.
- Listed height: 6 ft 2 in (1.88 m)
- Listed weight: 213 lb (97 kg)

Career information
- High school: Palma (Salinas)
- College: Nevada (2009); Monterey Peninsula (2010–2011); San Jose State (2012–2013)
- NFL draft: 2014: 6th round, 183rd overall pick

Career history
- Chicago Bears (2014–2015); Baltimore Ravens (2016)*; Chicago Bears (2016); Miami Dolphins (2017–2018); Detroit Lions (2019)*; New York Jets (2019–2020)
- * Offseason or practice squad member only

Awards and highlights
- Second-team All-MWC (2013); Second-team All-WAC (2012)

Career NFL statistics
- Passing attempts: 48
- Passing completions: 31
- Completion percentage: 64.6%
- TD–INT: 1–1
- Passing yards: 287
- Passer rating: 79.1
- Stats at Pro Football Reference

David Daniel Fales (born October 4, 1990) is an American former professional football player who was a quarterback in the National Football League (NFL). He was selected by the Chicago Bears in the sixth round of the 2014 NFL draft. He played college football for the San Jose State Spartans.

Fales played high school football at Palma School in Salinas, California. After redshirting freshman year for the Nevada Wolfpack of the University of Nevada, Reno, Fales attended Monterey Peninsula College for two years and transferred to San Jose State University for his junior year in 2012. With Fales, the Spartans went 11–2 in 2012 with the school's first-ever BCS ranking, first AP Poll ranking since 1975, and first bowl game berth since 2006. With 31 touchdown passes in his first year with San Jose State, Fales was the most accurate FBS quarterback for the 2012 season and was MVP of the 2012 Military Bowl.

== Early life ==
Fales was born and raised in Salinas, California. A 2009 graduate of Palma High School in Salinas, Fales was twice selected as all-league as quarterback. As a junior, Fales was named as the starting quarterback after the fourth game of 2007 after the regular starter suffered a severe concussion. In his first game as starter on October 5, a 35–3 win over rival Salinas, Fales completed 5 of 10 passes for 57 yards, including one 26-yard touchdown pass. Palma also had over 200 rushing yards. With an 8–2 record for the 2007 regular season, Palma lost the first round Central Coast Section playoff game 20–14 to Los Gatos on November 16 after Fales lost a fumble with 1:33 left.

As a senior, Fales was Tri-County League offensive MVP. In Palma's homecoming game on October 10, 2008, Fales completed 15 of 19 passes for 164 yards and ran for two touchdowns in a 21–14 victory over Seaside. In his junior and senior years, Fales threw 31 touchdowns and nine interceptions on 220-for-319 passing over 3,267 yards. Having attracted little attention from college recruiters, Fales accepted a scholarship from the University of Nevada, Reno, the first school to offer him one. Other colleges that expressed interest in Fales included Boise State, Colorado, Colorado State, Kansas State, Oregon State, and Utah, but none of them offered scholarships. Scout.com ranked Fales #115 among quarterbacks in the United States.

== College career ==
A two-star recruit, Fales attracted only one offer from Nevada. On July 28, 2008, Fales signed with Nevada. Fales also attended a summer camp for Oregon State.

=== Nevada ===
At the University of Nevada, Fales redshirted his freshman year in 2009, behind starter and future NFL quarterback Colin Kaepernick. Fales later explained why he left Nevada: "I realized that what they wanted to do wasn't a good fit for me. They wanted me to be more of a runner."

=== Monterey Peninsula ===
In 2010, Fales returned home to Monterey County and transferred to Monterey Peninsula College. According to Fales, he "had a previous relationship with the head coach (Mike Rasmussen)" at the college.

Fales was a two-time all-conference selection and completed 61.8 percent of passes for 4,635 yards and 37 touchdowns.

After Wyoming offered Fales a non-scholarship position, Fales took a summer class at Wyoming in 2011 but returned to Monterey Peninsula for the fall. For the 2011 season with Fales, Monterey Peninsula was 2011 Coast Conference co-champion and qualified for the Sierra Central Credit Union Bowl. Fales was among the top ten junior college quarterbacks in number of completions, completion rate, passing yards, touchdown passes, and passer efficiency.

As a two-star recruit, Fales attracted one offer from San Jose State. On December 21, 2011, he signed with San Jose State.

College recruiting
| Name | Hometown | School | Height | Weight | Commit date |
|---|---|---|---|---|---|
| David Fales; QB | Salinas, CA | Monterey Peninsula CC | 6 ft 3 in (1.91 m) | 223 lb (101 kg) | Jan 3, 2012 |
| David Fales; QB | Recruit ratings: Scout: Rivals: 247Sports: | | | | |
Overall recruit ranking: Scout: – (QB), 97 (school) Rivals: – (QB), 99 (school) 247Sports: 170 (JUCO), 4 (pro-style QB), 63 (CA), 102 (school)
Note: In many cases, Scout, Rivals, 247Sports, On3, and ESPN may conflict in their listings of height and weight.; In these cases, the average was taken. ESPN grades are on a 100-point scale.; Sources: "2012 San Jose St. Football Commitment List". Rivals.; "2012 San Jose State College Football Team Recruiting Prospects". Scout.; "Scout.com Team Recruiting Rankings". Scout.; "2012 Team Ranking". Rivals.com.; "San Jose State 2012 Football Commits". 247Sports.

=== San Jose State ===
==== 2012 season ====
During the 2011 season, San Jose State found itself without a viable future starting quarterback after Tate Forcier, who was redshirting a year after transferring from Michigan, withdrew from San Jose State. Recruiting coordinator Terry Malley suggested recruiting Fales, and quarterbacks coach John DeFilippo met with Fales at Monterey Peninsula College. DeFilippo would later comment about Fales: "They did a great job with him at MPC. They ran a similar offense to what we had, a pro style. So I knew the learning curve wouldn't be as steep as with a guy coming from the spread offense." In December 2011, Fales signed a letter of intent for San Jose State University. The FCS school Indiana State University also offered Fales a scholarship.

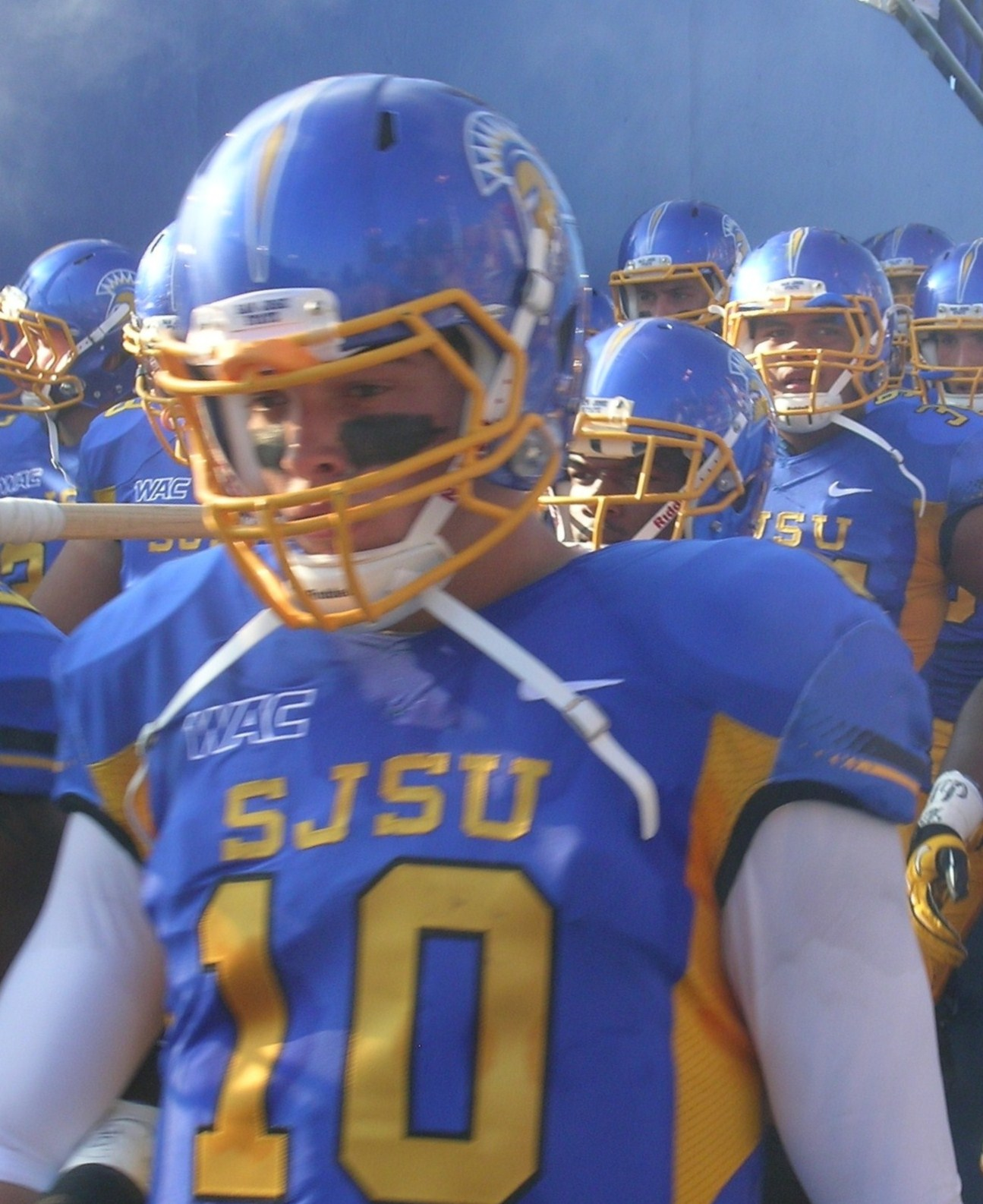
Fales enters the field of Spartan Stadium prior to the September 15, 2012, game.

On August 23, 2012, following summer training camps, coach Mike MacIntyre named Fales the starting quarterback. Fales debuted for San Jose State on August 31 against Stanford. In San Jose State's 20–17 loss, Fales completed 24 for 35 passes for 216 yards, one touchdown, and one interception. After SJSU trailed Stanford 17–3 at halftime, Fales capped a third quarter rally with a 21-yard touchdown pass to Noel Grigsby. Following the extra point, the game was tied at 17. Fales's interception occurred with one minute and 10 seconds left in the fourth quarter, and Stanford ran out the clock to win the game. Fales was also sacked three times for a loss of 17 yards but also had one 8-yard run. For the next two games, both at home against UC Davis on September 8 and Colorado State on September 15, Fales had interception-free games with a total of four touchdowns: one on September 8 and three on September 15.

On September 22, in a 38–34 road victory over San Diego State, Fales completed 21 of 31 passes for 260 yards, four touchdowns, and an interception. The lead changed four times in the fourth quarter after one tie. With 50 seconds left in the game, Fales capped a five-play, 65-yard drive with the winning 14-yard touchdown pass to Chandler Jones. Fales had a season-high completion percentage of 85.3 percent (29-for-34, 276 yards) in San Jose State's 12–0 road victory over Navy on September 29 but threw no touchdowns and one interception. After the Navy game, San Jose State was 4–1, the best start since its 2006 New Mexico Bowl championship season.

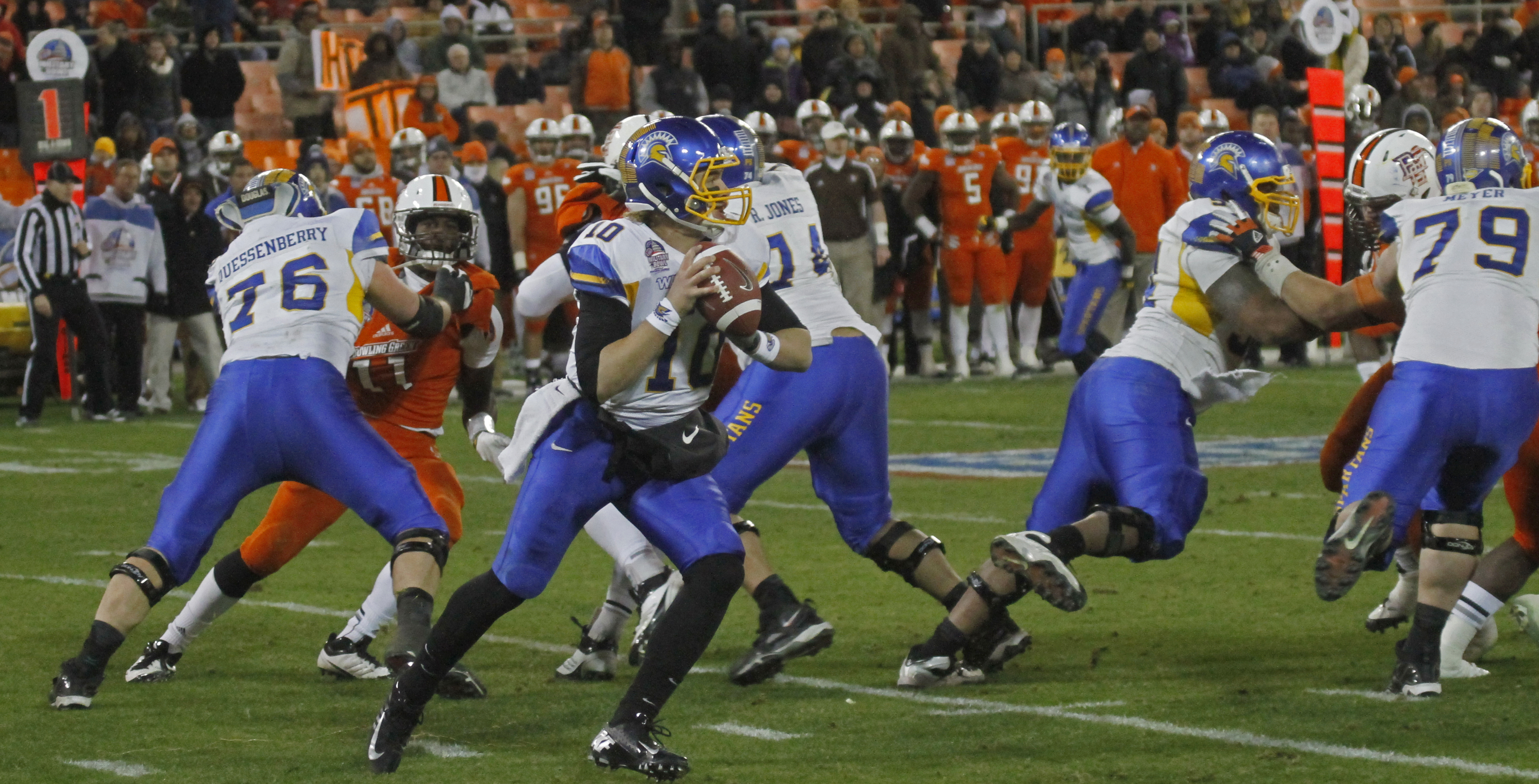
Fales drops back to pass in the 2012 Military Bowl, for which he was named MVP.

Despite this start, San Jose State would lose its homecoming game 49–27 to Utah State on October 13. Although Fales completed 38 of 50 passes for three touchdowns and no interceptions, Fales was sacked 13 times for a total loss of 102 yards. Fales also lost a fumble late in the game, and Utah State scored its final touchdown off that turnover. After this loss, Fales would lead SJSU to four straight wins and an 8–2 record by November 10. In those four games, three of which were away games, Fales threw 13 touchdowns and 4 interceptions. By November, Fales was approaching school records for career passing yards and touchdowns. On November 17, San Jose State won its ninth game of the year and reached its first nine-win season since 2006. In a game nationally televised on ESPN2, Fales completed 25 of 34 passes for 305 yards for three touchdowns and one interception in San Jose State's 20–14 win over BYU. Those three touchdowns all came from San Jose State's first three offensive drives. San Jose State's next game, the season finale victory on November 24 against Louisiana Tech, again was nationally televised on ESPN2. For the sixth time this season, Fales passed for more than 300 yards, as he completed 25 of 37 passes for three touchdowns and an interception.

For the regular 2012 season, Fales threw for 3,798 yards with 31 touchdowns and nine interceptions. With a completion rate of 72.1 percent, Fales was the most accurate passer and third in efficiency nationally among FBS starting quarterbacks. In addition to second-team All-Western Athletic Conference honors, Fales made the Sports Illustrated honorable mention All-American team.

On November 25, San Jose State made the 24th spot in the Bowl Championship Series (BCS) Top 25 rankings. This was San Jose State's first-ever BCS ranking and first national ranking since 1990. The following week, both the AP Poll and USA Today Coaches' Poll ranked San Jose State 24th in the top 25. This ranking marked San Jose State's first top-25 AP ranking since 1975. San Jose State also played its first bowl game since the 2006 New Mexico Bowl. On December 27, San Jose State defeated Bowling Green in the 2012 Military Bowl by a score of 29–20. With 33 of 43 passes completed for 395 yards and 2 touchdowns, Fales was named the game's most valuable player.

==== 2013 season ====
Prior to the 2013 season, Fales was being projected as a first round pick in the 2014 NFL draft.

San Jose State started off 2013 with a 24–0 win over Sacramento State on August 29. Fales completed 16-of-32 passes for 225 yards and 2 touchdowns. The next game on September 7, in a 34–13 loss to Stanford, Fales completed 29 of 43 passes for 216 yards, 1 touchdown, and 1 interception and was sacked 4 times for 39 lost yards. Fales again played well on September 24 with 29 of 43 passes completed for 216 yards, 1 touchdown, and 1 interception, but San Jose State lost to Minnesota 43–24. On September 27 in a 40–12 loss to Utah State, Fales completed 25 of 48 passes for 314 yards and 2 interceptions. In contrast to last year's game against Utah State where he was sacked 13 times, Fales was sacked only once in this game.

San Jose State won on October 5, 37–27 over Hawaii. Fales completed 16 of 35 passes for 318 yards, 3 touchdowns, and 2 interceptions. In a 31–0 run that followed a 14–3 first quarter deficit, Fales threw touchdowns of 61, 35, and 27 yards. On October 12, in Colorado State's homecoming game, San Jose State won 34–27. Completing 28 of 35 passes for 431 yards, Fales threw 3 touchdowns of 83, 77, and 62 yards. According to The Coloradoan, Fales completed several of his passes after eluding backfield defenders. Excluding two sacks for a loss of 13 yards, Fales had a career-high 33 rushing yards on 7 scrambles. Following the game, the NCAA ranked Colorado State next-to-last in pass defense efficiency among all FBS teams. With 5:36 left in the game, Fales threw the winning touchdown 62 yards to true freshman wide receiver Tyler Winston. Following a bye week, San Jose State won its homecoming game on October 26, 51–44 over Wyoming. Fales reached new career highs in passing yardage and touchdowns as he completed 27 of 37 passes for 482 yards and 5 touchdowns; Fales also scored the winning touchdown on a 1-yard sneak with 8 seconds left. This was also Fales's fifth consecutive game with over 300 passing yards, a Mountain West Conference record.

After starting the season 5–3, San Jose State then lost three games in a row. On November 9, San Jose State lost 34–30 to San Diego State after leading for most of the game. On fourth down with 2:35 left, Fales threw an interception, and San Diego State won after running out the clock. Fales had three touchdown passes. One of the touchdowns came after a trick play in which Fales pitched the ball to wide receiver Tim Crawley, who pitched the ball back. Fales then passed deep to Chandler Jones for a 40-yard touchdown. In San Jose State's loss to Nevada the following week, Fales completed 28 of 43 passes for 326 yards and a touchdown. On November 2, in a home game against Navy nationally televised on ESPN2's College Football Friday Primetime, Fales completed 42 of 56 passes for 440 yards and again had 5 passing touchdowns. However, San Jose State lost 58–52 in triple overtime after Fales threw an interception during the third overtime, and Navy quarterback Keenan Reynolds then scored the winning touchdown. San Jose State finished 6–6 after beating AP 16th-ranked and 11–0 Fresno State 62–52 in San Jose on November 29. Fales threw a career-high six touchdown passes and single-game school record 547 yards.

Despite a bowl-eligible 6–6 record, San Jose State did not receive a bowl game invitation. Fales finished his San Jose State career breaking Adam Tafralis's San Jose State records for career pass completions (639) and career total offense (8,250 yards) and Fales's own record for single-season total offense (4,196 yards). Fales surpassed Steve Clarkson's previous record with 66 career touchdown passes and Tafralis's previous record with 8,382 passing yards.

== Professional career ==
Pre-draft measurables
| Height | Weight | Arm length | Hand span | 40-yard dash | 20-yard shuttle | Three-cone drill | Vertical jump | Broad jump |
|---|---|---|---|---|---|---|---|---|
| 6 ft 1 5/8 in (1.87 m) | 212 lb (96 kg) | 31 3/4 in (0.81 m) | 9 1/4 in (0.23 m) | 4.99 s | 4.50 s | 7.55 s | 28 in (0.71 m) | 8 ft 7 in (2.62 m) |
All values from the NFL Combine

=== Chicago Bears (first stint) ===
Fales was selected by the Chicago Bears in the sixth round of the 2014 NFL draft with the 183rd overall pick. Fales was the first San Jose State quarterback to be drafted since Mike Perez in 1988, and the fourth in school history since the AFL-NFL merger. On May 12, 2014, Fales signed a four-year contract with the Bears. Fales ended a 26-year drought for San Jose State quarterbacks being drafting in the NFL when he was selected by the Bears. "It’s an honor," Fales said. "I’m excited to be representing San Jose State." Fales is the school’s record holder in every significant passing category including career and single season marks in passing-yards and touchdowns. Fales would be San Jose State’s first quarterback since Jeff Garcia to play in the NFL.

Fales played sparingly throughout the 2014 preseason, where he saw most of his action in the finale. With Fales still fighting for a spot on the final roster with the other backup quarterbacks, he was given the start and saw significant playing time in the final preseason game of 2014. In that game, Fales made a good case for himself to make the team, by finishing the game going 13-of-24 for 146 yards and a touchdown. However, Fales was waived on September 12. After he cleared waivers, he was signed to the Bears' practice squad on September 14. On December 13, Fales was elevated from the Bears' practice squad to the team's 53-man roster. The move came right after the New England Patriots attempted to sign Fales. On November 23, 2015, Fales was promoted once again to the active roster after Jimmy Clausen was waived.

On September 3, 2016, Fales was released by the Bears as part of final roster cuts.

=== Baltimore Ravens ===
On September 6, 2016, Fales was signed to the Baltimore Ravens' practice squad. He was released by the Ravens on November 8, but he was re-signed two days later, only to be released again on November 15. Fales was re-signed again to the Ravens' practice squad on November 19.

=== Chicago Bears (second stint) ===
On November 23, 2016, Fales was signed off of the Ravens' practice squad by the Chicago Bears. In Week 17, he made his NFL debut in the team's regular season finale, entering the game in the fourth quarter and completing 2-of-5 passes for 22 yards as the Bears lost to the Minnesota Vikings by a score of 38–10.

=== Miami Dolphins ===
On April 5, 2017, Fales signed with the Miami Dolphins. He was waived by the team on September 2. On October 24, the Dolphins brought back Fales to back up Matt Moore after an injury to starter Jay Cutler. On December 3, Fales made his first regular season appearance as a Dolphin, as the Dolphins were up 35–9 with three minutes left in the game, he made two handoffs to Senorise Perry, and went 0-of-1 passing. In the regular season finale, on December 31, Fales replaced Cutler after the first series. Fales then completed 29-of-42 passes for 265 yards, one touchdown, and one interception while also rushing for a one-yard touchdown as the Dolphins lost to the Buffalo Bills by a score of 22–16. His first career passing touchdown was a one-yard pass to Jarvis Landry.

On March 15, 2018, Fales re-signed with the Dolphins. He was named the third-string quarterback behind Ryan Tannehill and Brock Osweiler, but did not appear in a game all season.

=== Detroit Lions ===
On June 10, 2019, Fales was signed by the Detroit Lions. He was waived by Detroit on August 27.

=== New York Jets ===
On September 18, 2019, Fales was signed by the New York Jets. On September 23, Fales was released. On October 4, Fales was re-signed by the Jets.

On April 23, 2020, Fales re-signed with the Jets. On September 5, Fales was released by the Jets and re-signed to the practice squad the next day. He was released on October 28.

== Career statistics ==
=== NFL ===
| Year | Team | Games | | Passing | | | | | | | | Rushing | | | |
| Year | Team | GP | GS | Cmp | Att | Pct | Yds | Y/A | TD | Int | Rtg | Att | Yds | Avg | TD |
|---|---|---|---|---|---|---|---|---|---|---|---|---|---|---|---|
| 2016 | CHI | 1 | 0 | 2 | 5 | 40.0 | 22 | 4.4 | 0 | 0 | 53.8 | 1 | 0 | 0.0 | 0 |
| 2017 | MIA | 2 | 0 | 29 | 43 | 67.4 | 265 | 6.2 | 1 | 1 | 82.0 | 4 | 8 | 2.0 | 1 |
| 2018 | MIA | 0 | 0 | DNP | | | | | | | | | | | |
| 2019 | NYJ | 2 | 0 | 0 | 0 | 0.0 | 0 | 0.0 | 0 | 0 | 0.0 | 0 | 0 | 0.0 | 0 |
| Career | | 5 | 0 | 31 | 48 | 64.6 | 287 | 6.0 | 1 | 1 | 79.1 | 5 | 8 | 2.0 | 1 |

=== College ===
| Season | Team | Passing | | | | | | | | Rushing | | | |
| Season | Team | Cmp | Att | Pct | Yds | Y/A | TD | Int | Rtg | Att | Yds | Avg | TD |
|---|---|---|---|---|---|---|---|---|---|---|---|---|---|
| 2012 | San Jose State | 327 | 451 | 72.5 | 4,193 | 9.3 | 33 | 9 | 170.8 | 42 | −139 | −3.3 | 0 |
| 2013 | San Jose State | 312 | 487 | 64.1 | 4,189 | 8.6 | 33 | 13 | 153.3 | 48 | 7 | 0.1 | 2 |
| Career | | 639 | 938 | 68.1 | 8,382 | 8.9 | 66 | 22 | 161.7 | 90 | −132 | −1.5 | 2 |
