= Fales =

Fales is a surname. Notable people with the surname include:

- Almira Fales (1809–1868), American nurse
- David Fales (born 1990), American football player
- DeCoursey Fales (1888–1966), American lawyer, banker, collector, bibliophile and yachtsman
- Doris E. Fales (1902–1992), American embryologist
- Josef Fales (1938–2022), Ukrainian footballer and coach
- Martha Gandy Fales (1930–2006), American art historian and curator
- Steven Fales (born 1970), American playwright and actor

== See also ==
- Fales Library, special collections library at New York University
