= Soquel High School =

Location
- 401 Old San Jose Road; Santa Cruz, California 95073; United States; 36°59′28″N 121°57′34″W

Information
- Type: Public secondary school
- Established: 1962; 64 years ago
- School district: Santa Cruz City Schools District
- Teaching staff: 46.58 (on an FTE basis)
- Grades: 9–12
- Enrollment: 1,048 (2023-2024)
- Student to teacher ratio: 21.14
- Colors: Blue and gold
- Athletics conference: CIF Central Coast Section - SCCAL
- Nickname: Knights
- Website: soquel.sccs.net

Soquel High School is a high school in Soquel, California, located on Old San Jose Road. It has 1,200 students and was established in 1962. The school is operated by the Santa Cruz City Schools District. The school mascot is the Knights.

== Athletics ==
Soquel High School offers a variety of competitive sports and is part of the Santa Cruz Coast Athletic League (SCCAL) and the California Interscholastic Federation-Central Coast Section (CCS). In the fall Soquel offers Cross Country, Football, Girls Golf, Girls Tennis, Girls Volleyball, and Water Polo. The men's water polo team has been particularly successful winning 20 straight SCCAL championships and a CCS championship in 2003. In winter, Soquel offers Basketball, Soccer and Wrestling, and in the spring there is Baseball, Softball, Track & Field, Swimming & Diving, Boys Tennis, Boys Golf, and Boys Volleyball. In addition, Soquel High School students can compete in surfing and cheerleading that fall outside of the SCCAL and CCS and are listed under Club Sports.

== Student body ==
While the student body changes year to year it is typically comprised ethnically of: American Indian 1%, Asian 3%, Hispanic 34%, Black 1%, White 57%, Decline to state 4%. Typically 51% of the students are male and 49% female. The teacher to student ratio is about 1:18.

== Notable alumni ==
- Kyra Davis, author
- Linda Gustavson, Olympic Gold Medal swimmer; two other Olympic medals
- David Cay Johnston, Pulitzer Prize-winning investigative reporter and best-selling author
- Dwight Lowery, NFL cornerback
- Casey McGehee, MLB Infielder
- Edmund McMillen, video game designer / Artist
- John Orton, former MLB catcher
- Kent Pollock, Anchorage Daily News editor
- Todd Replogle, video game programmer
- Luke Rockhold, professional mixed martial artist and former UFC middleweight champion
- Chris Sharma, climber
- Derek Sherinian, rock keyboardist
- Maggie Vessey, middle-distance runner
