= Matt Castelo =

American gridiron football player (born 1986)

No. 40
- Position: Linebacker

Personal information
- Born: March 26, 1986 (age 40); San Jose, California
- Listed height: 5 ft 10 in (1.78 m)
- Listed weight: 220 lb (100 kg)

Career information
- High school: San Jose (CA) Valley Christian
- College: San Jose State
- NFL draft: 2008: undrafted

Career history
- Seattle Seahawks (2008)*; Hamilton Tiger-Cats (2009)*; San Jose SaberCats (2011)
- * Offseason or practice squad member only

Awards and highlights
- 2× first-team All-WAC (2006–2007); New Mexico Bowl defensive MVP (2006)

Career AFL statistics
- Tackles: 3
- Sacks: 1
- Stats at ArenaFan.com

Matthew Alexander Castelo (born March 26, 1986) is a former professional football linebacker. He was signed by the Seattle Seahawks as an undrafted free agent in 2008. He played college football for the San Jose State Spartans. Castelo was also a member of the Hamilton Tiger-Cats of the Canadian Football League (CFL).

== Early life ==
Born in San Jose, California to a Filipino-American family, Castelo attended Valley Christian High School in San Jose, where he earned All-Central Coast Section honors twice. As a senior, he had 128 tackles, 10 sacks and was named league’s "Linebacker of the Year".

== College career ==
Castelo started with the San Jose State Spartans in 2004. In his first game against Washington, Castelo had an interception. In 2005, Castelo finished the season with 91 tackles.

In 2006, Castelo was ranked number-two nationally with 165 total tackles. He earned second-team all-WAC honors, and was the WAC Defensive Player of the Week. In the 2006 New Mexico Bowl, Castelo had 18 tackles and 2 forced fumbles and was named the defensive Most Valuable Player. He was named to ESPN.com's all-Bowl team.

In 2007, Castelo returned as the nation’s top returning tackler in terms of career average with a 9.42 per game. Castelo had 141 tackles in his senior season. He was named to the all-WAC first-team with teammate Dwight Lowery. Castelo completed his career at San Jose State with 433 (203 solo) tackles, 5.5 sacks, and 3 interceptions in 43 games.

== Professional career ==
=== Seattle Seahawks ===
He was considered a prospect for the 2008 NFL draft, but after going undrafted, signed with the Seattle Seahawks. Castelo was released from the Seahawks August 12, 2008.

=== Hamilton Tiger-Cats ===
Castelo signed with the Hamilton Tiger-Cats on May 21, 2009. He was released on June 25, 2009.

=== San Jose SaberCats ===
On April 21, 2011, Castelo signed with the San Jose SaberCats of the Arena Football League. Castelo made his professional football debut on April 23 against the Philadelphia Soul and had 3 tackles and a sack in what would be his only game for the team.

== Post-football career ==
Castelo completed his Bachelor of Science degree in business management at the San Jose State Lucas College of Business in August 2010. He is now a real estate investor "who focuses primarily on older and distressed properties."

== See also ==
- List of NCAA major college football yearly tackles leaders
