= Gregg Tafralis =

American shot putter (1958–2023)

Personal information
- Born: April 9, 1958 San Francisco, California, United States
- Died: August 11, 2023 (aged 65)

Sport
- Sport: Track and field
Medal record
Representing United States
Pan American Games
Silver medal – second place	1987 Indianapolis	Shot put

Gregory Louis Tafralis (April 9, 1958 – August 11, 2023) was an American track and field athlete.

== Early life and career ==
Gregory Louis Tafralis was born in San Francisco, California, on April 9, 1958. He set the best world year performance in the men's shot put event in 1992. He competed for his native country at the 1988 Summer Olympics, finishing in ninth place. He won two silver medals at the Pan American Games, first in 1987 and then in 1995.

The second medal was taken away from him because of a positive test for steroids at an earlier meet. After his suspension ran out in 1999, Tafralis tested positive for a banned substance methandienone and was banned for life.

His personal best throw was 21.98 metres, achieved in May 1988 in Los Gatos.

== Personal life and death ==
His son Adam, was a college football quarterback for San Jose State University who then played for the Hamilton Tiger-Cats of the Canadian Football League.

Gregg Tafralis died on August 11, 2023, at the age of 65.
