= Kevin Jurovich =

American football player (born 1986)

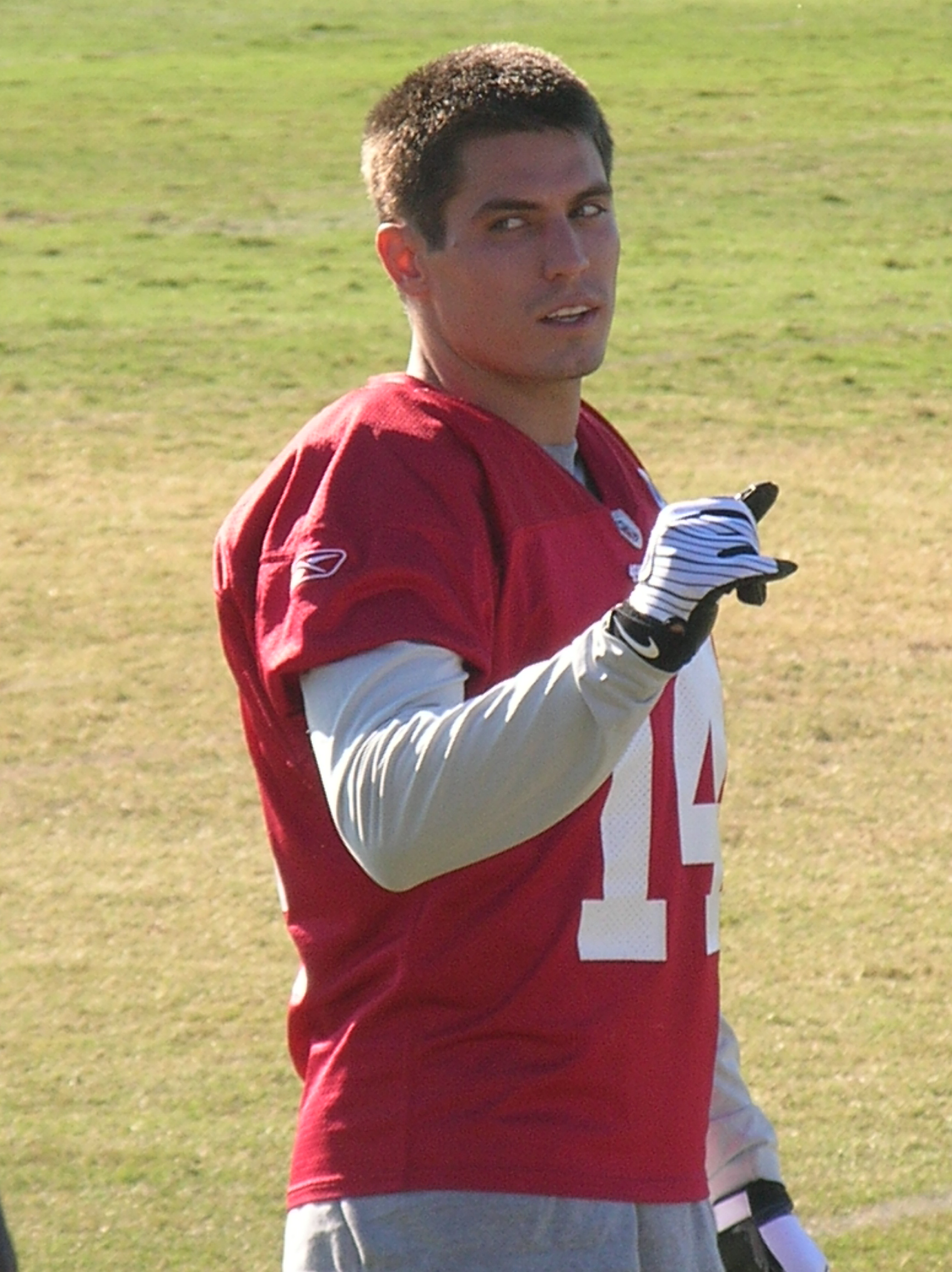
- Kevin Jurovich at San Francisco 49ers training camp in 2010.

No. 14, 19
- Position: Wide receiver

Personal information
- Born: June 30, 1986 (age 40); Santa Clara, California
- Listed height: 6 ft 0 in (1.83 m)
- Listed weight: 188 lb (85 kg)

Career information
- High school: Valley Christian (San Jose, California)
- College: San Jose State
- NFL draft: 2010: undrafted

Career history
- Philadelphia Eagles (2010); San Francisco 49ers (2010–2011); Chicago Bears (2011)*
- * Offseason or practice squad member only

Awards and highlights
- All-WAC (2007, 2009); New Mexico Bowl champion (2006)
- Stats at Pro Football Reference

Kevin Allan Jurovich (born June 30, 1986) is an American former football wide receiver. He signed as an undrafted free agent with the Philadelphia Eagles in 2010. He played college football at San Jose State University.

Jurovich was also member of the San Francisco 49ers and Chicago Bears.

== Early life ==
A native of Santa Clara, California, Jurovich graduated from Valley Christian High School in San Jose, California. He started at quarterback, free safety and punt returner his senior year in high school. The 2003 Valley Christian Warriors won the CCS title. That year, he combined for 19 touchdowns while averaging 23.8 yards per punt return. Jurovich was named 1st team all-ccs by the Mercury News.

College recruiting
Name	Hometown	School	Height	Weight	Commit date
Kevin Jurovich; CB	San Jose, CA	Valley Christian HS	6 ft 0 in (1.83 m)	175 lb (79 kg)	Feb 4, 2004
Kevin Jurovich; CB	Recruit ratings: Rivals: 247Sports:				
Overall recruit ranking: Scout: 111 (school) Rivals: 111 (school) 247Sports: 142 (CB), 222 (CA), 90 (school)
Note: In many cases, Scout, Rivals, 247Sports, On3, and ESPN may conflict in their listings of height and weight.; In these cases, the average was taken. ESPN grades are on a 100-point scale.; Sources: "2004 San Jose St. Football Commitment List". Rivals.; "2004 San Jose State College Football Team Recruiting Prospects". Scout.; "Scout.com Team Recruiting Rankings". Scout.; "2004 Team Ranking". Rivals.com.; "San Jose State 2004 Football Commits". 247Sports.

== College career ==
From 2004 to 2009, Jurovich played for the San Jose State Spartans football team. He majored in communications.

After redshirting his freshman season in 2004, Jurovich debuted in 2005 as a safety, holding the ball for kick-scoring attempts. As a redshirt sophomore in 2006, during his team's run to the 2006 New Mexico Bowl, Jurovich left the team in October due to a hand injury, among other reasons. Jurovich returned to the team in 2007 as a wide receiver.

In 2007, he broke San Jose States record for receptions in a season, he finished the season with 85 receptions for 1183 yards and 9 touchdowns.

Jurovich finished his career as San Jose State's all time leader in receptions (160) and fourth in receiving yards(2,143).

== Professional career ==
Pre-draft measurables
Height	Weight	Arm length	Hand span	40-yard dash	10-yard split	20-yard split	20-yard shuttle	Vertical jump	Broad jump	Bench press
6 ft 0 in (1.83 m)	188 lb (85 kg)	30 1/2 in (0.77 m)	9 1/2 in (0.24 m)	4.43 s	1.57 s	2.65 s	4.20 s	37 1/2 in (0.95 m)	10 ft 2 in (3.10 m)	14 reps
Bench, arm and hand spans were taken at the NFL Scouting Combine. All other values were taken at Pro Day 2010.

=== Philadelphia Eagles ===
On April 26, 2010, Jurovich signed as an undrafted free agent to the Philadelphia Eagles, but he was released on July 29.

=== San Francisco 49ers ===
The San Francisco 49ers signed Jurovich to a two-year contract on August 8, 2010. Jurovich was on the 49ers practice squad for the 2010 season. Kevin Lynch, writing for SFGate.com, commented that Jurovich "has some kickoff return ability and never drops a pass." The 49ers cut Jurovich on September 3, placed him on practice squad two days later, and signed him again on January 5, 2011. He was released by the 49ers on August 30, 2011.

The Chicago Bears signed Jurovich to the practice squad on December 21, 2011.
