= Ugly (Sevendust song) =

Single by Sevendust

from the album Next
- Released: July 19, 2005
- Studio: J. Stanley Productions Inc. (Orlando, Florida)
- Length: 4:10
- Label: Winedark
- Songwriters: John Connolly; Vinnie Hornsby; Sonny Mayo; Morgan Rose; Lajon Witherspoon
- Producers: John Connolly; Morgan Rose; Shawn Grove

Sevendust singles chronology
"Face to Face" (2004)	"Ugly" (2005)	"Failure" (2006)

Music video
- "Ugly" on Dailymotion

"Ugly" is a song by the American rock band Sevendust. It was released on July 19, 2005, as the lead single from the band's fifth studio album, Next (2005). The single peaked at No. 12 on Billboard's Mainstream Rock chart.

The song was described by drummer Morgan Rose in an MTV.com interview as being a mixed bag with a "huge chorus, broken-down verses and really heavy bridges."

== Music video ==
The music video for "Ugly", directed by P. R. Brown, depicts the band in a dark alley and civilians being lured into a laboratory where they get their eyes taken out. It was the first music video in which guitarist Sonny Mayo appeared.

== Charts ==
Chart (2005)	Peak position
US Mainstream Rock (Billboard)	12
