= Craig Kimball =

American football player (born c.1953)

Profile
- Position: Quarterback

Personal information
- Born: c. 1953

Career information
- High school: Lowell (San Francisco)
- College: San Jose State (1972–1974)

Career history
- San Francisco 49ers (1975)*
- * Offseason or practice squad member only

Craig Kimball (born c. 1953) is a former American football quarterback. He played college football for the San Jose State Spartans from 1972 to 1974. In 1974, he led all major-college players in pass attempts (355) and passing touchdowns (23), ranked second in passing yards (2,401) and interceptions (19), third in total yards (2,338) and yards gained per game (200.1), and fourth in pass completions (175). In three years at San Jose State, he completed 485 of 983 passes (49.3%) for 6,139 passing yards, 50 touchdowns, 56 interceptions, and a 107.2 passer rating. Kimball signed as a free agent with the San Francisco 49ers in February 1975. He played for the 49ers during the preseason. He was waived by the 49ers in late July 1975.

== See also ==
- San Jose State Spartans football statistical leaders#Passing
