= 2006 New Mexico Bowl =

American college football game

New Mexico Lobos	San Jose State Spartans
(6–6)	(8–4)
Mountain West	WAC
12	20
Head coach: Rocky Long	Head coach: Dick Tomey
	1	2	3	4	Total
New Mexico	0	3	0	9	12
San Jose State	0	13	7	0	20
- Date: December 23, 2006
- Season: 2006
- Stadium: University Stadium
- Location: Albuquerque, New Mexico
- MVP: Offensive: WR James Jones, SJSU; Defensive: LB Matt Castelo, SJSU
- Referee: Brian O'Cain (Pac-10)
- Attendance: 34,111
- Payout: US$1,000,000 per team

United States TV coverage
- Network: ESPN
- Announcers: Bob Wischusen, Rod Gilmore, Trevor Matich and Stacey Dales
- Nielsen ratings: 1.81

The 2006 New Mexico Bowl was a postseason American college football bowl game held on December 23, 2006 at University Stadium on the University of New Mexico campus in Albuquerque as part of the 2006–07 NCAA football bowl games. The game, telecast on ESPN, featured the San Jose State Spartans from the WAC and the hometown New Mexico Lobos from the Mountain West Conference. The game was the inaugural New Mexico Bowl and the first bowl game held in the state.

San Jose State controlled the action all game long, jumping out to a 20–3 lead before New Mexico tacked on 9 points in the final few minutes. Spartan quarterback Adam Tafralis threw three touchdown passes, two to offensive MVP James Jones, in a dominant performance. With the loss, New Mexico's postseason drought was extended to 45 years.

== Game summary ==
=== First Quarter ===
The game was scoreless through the first quarter with each team punting on all of their three possessions.

=== Second Quarter ===
On the first play of the second quarter, San Jose State quarterback Adam Tafralis threw a 76-yard touchdown pass to wide receiver John Broussard who was wide open on a blown coverage. The nine second scoring drive gave San Jose State a 7–0 lead they would not relinquish. On the ensuing kickoff, New Mexico return man DeAndre Wright took the kickoff to the San Jose State 40-yard line. The Lobos used the field position to set up a first and goal at the one-yard line but fumbled on third down in the endzone after San Jose State linebacker Matt Castelo put his helmet on the ball and knocked it loose from the Lobos' Rodney Ferguson. Spartan Damaja Jones caught the ball out of the air and returned it 57 yards to the New Mexico 43, changing momentum for good in the game. After a pair punts, Tafralis connected with wide receiver James Jones who made a man miss on the sideline and went in for a 36-yard touchdown to give San Jose State a 13–0 lead. The PAT was missed. New Mexico kicker Kenny Byrd got the Lobos on the board on the following drive with a 40-yard field goal to make the score 13–3.

=== Third Quarter ===
After two punts to start the second half, New Mexico fumbled again on a crucial 4th and 1 run on their own side of the field and did not convert. On the fourth play of the ensuing Spartan drive, Tafralis took advantage with his third scoring toss of the day, connecting with James Jones for a 24-yard jump ball to increase his team's lead to 20–3. Spartans All-American defensive back Dwight Lowery returned an interception for a touchdown late in the quarter but it was wiped away by a pass interference call.

=== Fourth Quarter ===
San Jose State's defense held New Mexico's offense in check after recovering three more Lobo fumbles, and looked poised to run out the clock. Backed up deep in their end zone and leading by 17, San Jose State coach Dick Tomey elected to have punter Waylon Prather take a safety rather than risk a turnover or blocked punt, bringing the score to 20–5. With only 58 seconds remaining after a squib kick, New Mexico quarterback Chris Nelson - who replaced freshman starter Donovan Porterie for the second half - led his team down the field with three first down throws and a 15-yard scoring strike to wideout Marcus Smith, cutting the deficit to 20–12. San Jose State recovered the ensuing onside kick with 15 seconds left and knelt on the ball, capturing the inaugural New Mexico Bowl.

=== Scoring summary ===
Quarter	1	2	3	4	Total
New Mexico	0	3	0	9	12
San Jose State	0	13	7	0	20

at University Stadium, Albuquerque, New Mexico

- Date: December 23, 2006
- Game time: 4:31 p.m. EST
- 2nd Quarter
  - SJSU – John Broussard 76-yard pass from Adam Tafralis (Jared Strubeck kick), 14:51. San Jose State 7–0. Drive: 1 play, 76 yards, 0:19.
  - SJSU – James Jones 36-yard pass from Adam Tafralis (kick missed), 03:59. San Jose State 13–0. Drive: 5 plays, 69 yards, 2:10.
  - UNM – Kenny Byrd 40-yard field goal, 01:11. San Jose State 13–3. Drive: 8 plays, 57 yards, 2:39.
- 3rd Quarter
  - SJSU – James Jones 24-yard pass from Adam Tafralis (Jared Strubeck kick), 04:33. San Jose State 20–3. Drive: 4 plays, 43 yards, 1:55.
- 4th Quarter
  - UNM - Team Safety, 01:08. San Jose State 20–5.'
  - UNM – Marcus Smith 15-yard pass from Chris Nelson (Kenny Byrd kick), 00:15. San Jose State 20–12. Drive: 5 plays, 57 yards, 0:45.

== Game notes ==
- The win was San Jose State's first bowl win outside of their home state of California.
- With the loss, New Mexico's postseason win drought was extended to 45 years, when they won the 1961 Aviation Bowl.
- Byrd's made field goal was New Mexico's first in 10 bowl appearances.
- Ferguson, who led the MWC in rushing, finished the game with 102 yards on 22 carries.
- With their ninth win of the year, San Jose State won more games than they had the previous three years combined
