= Noel Grigsby =

American football player (born 1991)

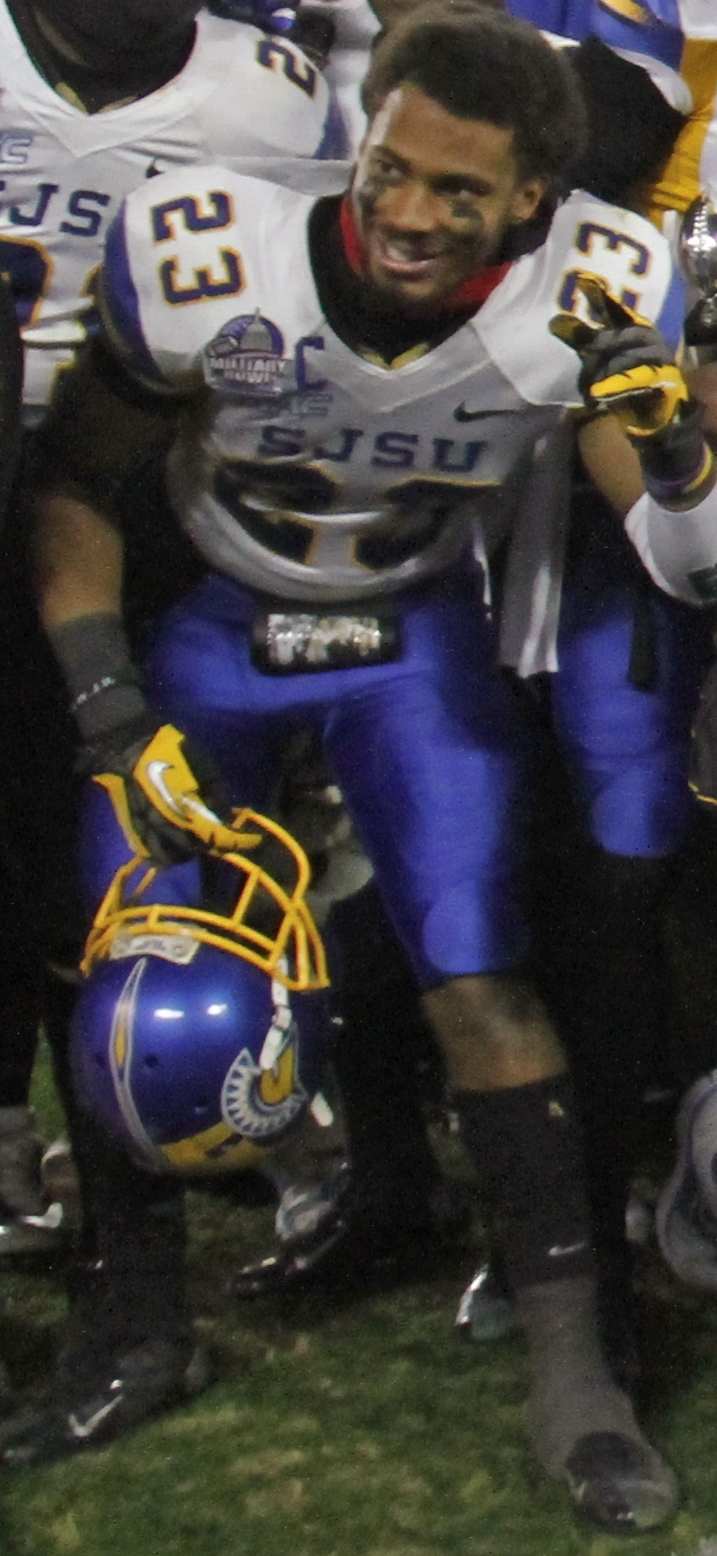
- Grigsby after 2012 Military Bowl

Profile
- Position: Wide receiver

Personal information
- Born: October 2, 1991 (age 35); Los Angeles, California
- Listed height: 5 ft 11 in (1.80 m)
- Listed weight: 175 lb (79 kg)

Career information
- High school: Crenshaw (Los Angeles, California)
- College: San Jose State
- NFL draft: 2014: undrafted

Career history
- Oakland Raiders (2014)*
- * Offseason or practice squad member only

Awards and highlights
- Military Bowl champion (2012); First-team All-WAC (2012); Second-team All-WAC (2011); Second-team Phil Steele Freshman All-American (2010)

Noel Keith Grigsby Jr. (born October 2, 1991) is an American football wide receiver. Grigsby played college football for the San Jose State Spartans. He set school records for career receptions and career receiving yards.

== High school ==
Born and raised in Los Angeles, California, Grigsby graduated from Crenshaw High School of the South Central region of Los Angeles in 2009. He was a wide receiver and defensive back in football and lettered also in basketball and track. San Jose State University, the University of Hawaii, and New Mexico State University offered Grigsby scholarships, and Arizona State University, Oregon State University, and UCLA also expressed interest. Grigsby committed with San Jose State on February 4, 2009.

College recruiting
Name	Hometown	School	Height	Weight	Commit date
Noel Grigsby; WR	Los Angeles, CA	Crenshaw HS	5 ft 10 in (1.78 m)	180 lb (82 kg)	Feb 4, 2009
Noel Grigsby; WR	Recruit ratings: Scout: Rivals:				
Overall recruit ranking: Scout: 320 (WR), 92 (school) Rivals: 87 (school)
Note: In many cases, Scout, Rivals, 247Sports, On3, and ESPN may conflict in their listings of height and weight.; In these cases, the average was taken. ESPN grades are on a 100-point scale.; Sources: "San Jose St. Football Commitment List". Rivals.; "San Jose State College Football Team Recruiting Prospects". Scout.; "Scout.com Team Recruiting Rankings". Scout.; "2009 Team Ranking". Rivals.com.

== College career ==
As a freshman, Grigsby enrolled as a civil engineering major at San Jose State University and redshirted the 2009 season.

In 2010, Grigsby had 56 receptions, 822 receiving yards, and 4 touchdowns. He was the first freshman in school history to garner 700 or more receiving yards in a season. On November 13, he had a season-high 185 receiving yards against Utah State. Grigsby made the Phil Steele Freshman All-American second-team.

Grigsby had 89 catches, 886 receiving yards, and 2 touchdowns in 2011. His 89 catches ranked second in the Western Athletic Conference (WAC) and was a San Jose State record for a single season; by late October, Grigsby was the leading pass receiver in the WAC. In San Jose State's season finale, a 27-24 win over rival Fresno State, Grigsby made an 18-yard touchdown reception giving San Jose State a 27-17 lead following the extra point. Grigsby ended the season on the all-WAC second-team.

In 2012, Grigsby had 82 receptions, 1,307 receiving yards, and 9 touchdowns. He ranked second in the WAC in receptions and receiving yards and ranked tenth in the NCAA in receiving yards. He also set San Jose State records for most catches and receiving yards in a career. Grigsby had a season-high 181 receiving yards against Utah State on October 13; his 20-yard touchdown reception with 24 seconds left before halftime capped 17 unanswered points from San Jose State to bring the team to a 28-20 deficit before halftime; San Jose State lost 49-27 to Utah State. He had 134 receiving yards against Bowling Green in the 2012 Military Bowl. In the WAC's final season sponsoring football before San Jose State moved to the Mountain West Conference, Grigsby made the All-WAC first-team.

As a senior in 2013, Grigsby played only the first two games of the season and was sidelined the rest of the season due to knee surgery. He had 10 receptions for 106 yards and two touchdowns and returned two punts for 16 yards. Grigsby graduated from San Jose State in December 2013 with a degree in communication studies.

== Professional career ==
Pre-draft measurables
Height	Weight	40-yard dash	10-yard split	20-yard split	20-yard shuttle	Three-cone drill	Vertical jump	Broad jump	Bench press
5 ft 10 in (1.78 m)	185 lb (84 kg)	4.69 s	1.65 s	2.65 s	4.34 s	7.00 s	37 1/2 in (0.95 m)	10 ft 1 in (3.07 m)	13 reps
All measurements are from 2014 Pro Day at San Jose State.

Following the 2014 NFL draft, Grigsby signed an undrafted free agent contract with the Oakland Raiders on May 16, 2014 and was waived on June 5.
