= Edell Shepherd =

American football player (born 1980)

No. 3, 86, 19, 16
- Position: Wide receiver

Personal information
- Born: May 18, 1980 (age 46); Los Angeles, California, U.S.
- Listed height: 6 ft 1 in (1.85 m)
- Listed weight: 175 lb (79 kg)

Career information
- High school: Susan Miller Dorsey (Los Angeles)
- College: San Jose State
- NFL draft: 2002: undrafted

Career history
- Chicago Bears (2002–2003)*; → Scottish Claymores (NFL Europe) (2003) (loan); Tampa Bay Buccaneers (2003–2005); Houston Texans (2006); Detroit Lions (2007)*; Denver Broncos (2008)
- * Offseason or practice squad member only

Awards and highlights
- Second-team All-WAC (2001)

Career NFL statistics
- Receptions: 13
- Receiving yards: 163
- Receiving touchdowns: 1
- Stats at Pro Football Reference

Edell Eugene Shepherd (born May 18, 1980) is an American former professional football player who was a wide receiver in the National Football League (NFL). He was signed by the Chicago Bears as an undrafted free agent in 2002. He played college football for the San José State Spartans.

Shepherd was also a member of the Tampa Bay Buccaneers, Houston Texans and Detroit Lions.

== Early life ==
Growing up in the South Central region of his birthplace Los Angeles, California, Shepherd attended Susan Miller Dorsey High School in Los Angeles, and was a letterman in football, track and field, and tennis. In football, as a senior, he made 39 receptions for 635 yards (16.28 yards per reception avg.) and five touchdowns. Edell Shepherd graduated from Dorsey High School in 1999.

== College career ==
Shepherd attended West Los Angeles College for two years. As a sophomore, he won JC All-American honors. At San Jose State University, in his junior year (2000), Shepherd made 42 catches for 707 yards and 4 touchdowns. In his senior season (2001) with the Spartans, Shepherd set records for single-game receiving yardage, single-season touchdowns (17), and most touchdown receptions in a game. He had more receptions than four Biletnikoff Award candidates. He was a second-team All-Western Athletic Conference selection in 2001.

== Professional career ==
=== Chicago Bears (2002) ===
Shepherd signed with Chicago on April 23, 2002, as an undrafted free agent following the 2002 NFL draft and spent all but the first two weeks of October 2002 in the practice squad.

=== Scottish Claymores (2003) ===
In the spring of 2003, the Chicago Bears assigned Shepherd to the NFL Europe team Scottish Claymores.

=== Tampa Bay Buccaneers (2003–2005) ===
The Tampa Bay Buccaneers signed Shepherd on September 2, 2003, three days after the Bears cut Shepherd. Making his NFL debut on December 7, Shepherd played two games for the Buccaneers in 2003. An offensive pass interference penalty on fellow wide receiver Charles Lee voided what would have been a 28-yard reception by Shepherd. On December 28, in the season finale, Shepherd made 4 receptions for 38 yards.

After spending 2004 on the disabled list, Shepherd played in all regular season games in 2005. That season, Shepherd made 6 receptions for 103 yards and a touchdown.

In the Buccaneers' 17–10 loss on January 7, 2006, to the Washington Redskins in the wild card round of the 2005 postseason, Shepherd dropped a 35-yard pass with fewer than 3 minutes left in the game on 3rd down and 10. Video replay showed that Shepherd lost control of the ball before he landed on the ground; otherwise his catch and following extra point would have tied the game.

=== Houston Texans (2006) ===
Signing with the Houston Texans on September 3, 2006, Shepherd played seven games for Houston in 2006 and made 3 receptions for 22 yards.

=== Detroit Lions and Denver Broncos (2007–2008) ===
He spent 2007 out of the league after being released by Detroit.

On July 26, 2008, Shepherd was placed on season-ending injured reserve with a torn ACL.
