= Failure (Sevendust song) =

Single by Sevendust

from the album Next
- Released: 2006
- Studio: J. Stanley Productions Inc. (Orlando, Florida)
- Length: 3:45
- Label: Winedark
- Songwriters: John Connolly; Vinnie Hornsby; Sonny Mayo; Morgan Rose; Lajon Witherspoon
- Producers: John Connolly; Morgan Rose; Shawn Grove

Sevendust singles chronology
"Ugly" (2005)	"Failure" (2006)	"Driven" (2007)

Failure is a song by the American rock band Sevendust. It was released as the second single from their fifth studio album, Next (2005). The song peaked at No. 28 on Billboard's Mainstream Rock chart.

== Song meaning ==
While people might think that the song's a downer, it's far from it. It actually conveys an enlightening message and encourages fans to look at the brighter side of life. "The message in it is really positive," explains guitarist Sonny Mayo. "It's about living life thinking you're gonna be a failure, and basing your whole existence on what other people or what another person told you about yourself, and finally coming out and realizing that it's all about inner strength and it doesn't matter what other people think about you. You could shed all the shame and all the guilt that you ever felt about things you did or things you didn't do, and you could truly find the positivity even if you always thought you were going to be a failure."

== Charts ==
Chart (2006)	Peak position
US Mainstream Rock (Billboard)	28
