= Fayl =

Coordinates: 15°18′N 48°22′E

- Village
- Interactive map of Fayl
- Country: Yemen
- Governorate: Hadhramaut Governorate
- Time zone: UTC+3 (Yemen Standard Time)

Fayl is a village in eastern Yemen. It is located in the Hadhramaut Governorate.
