= Failure Magazine =

Online magazine

Failure Magazine is an online magazine which features stories about failure. The magazine was established in 2000 by Jason Zasky and his cousin. It is headquartered in New York City. The magazine turned its first profit in 2005. The magazine features a column called, "This day in failure".
