= Almira Fales =

American nurse and philanthropist (1809–1868)

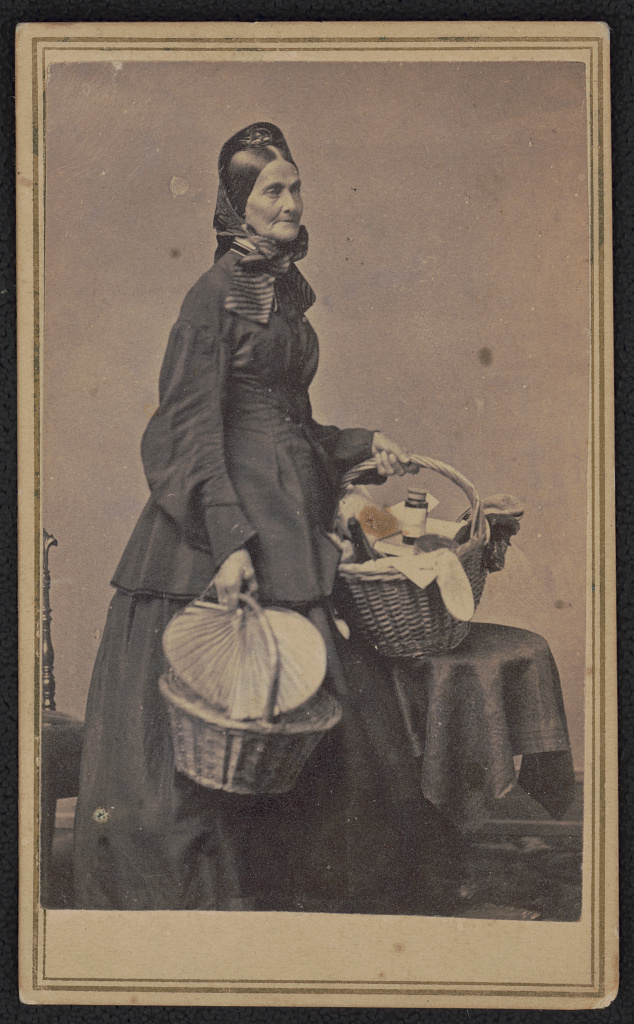
- Died: November 8, 1868; Washington, D.C.
- Occupation: Nurse

Almira L. Newcomb McNaughton Lockwood Fales (October 24, 1809 – November 8, 1868) was a philanthropist and nurse during the American Civil War.

== Early life ==
Almira L. Newcomb was born in Pittstown, New York, the fourth child and third daughter of Ariel Newcomb and Sarah Norris of Pittsford, New York. For some time she was a resident of Iowa.

== Marriages and children ==
=== Alexander McNaughton ===
Her first husband was Alexander McNaughton, who was a merchant from Monroe, New York. They were married from 1829 until his death in 1832, and had two children, Sarah and Alexander.

=== Leander Lockwood ===
In 1837, she married Leander Lockwood, a widower with five children from his first marriage. The couple had two children, Charles and Thomas Hartbenton, who both served in the Union Army during the Civil War. Thomas, a corporal in the 2nd Rhode Island Infantry, died on May 3, 1863, at the Battle of Salem Church. Lockwood died in 1845.

=== Joseph T. Fales ===
She married her third husband, Joseph T. Fales, in 1847. He was a widower with three children from his first marriage. In 1853, they moved to Washington, D.C. after her husband received an appointment as an examiner in the United States Patent Office. They were married until Almira Fales died on November 8, 1868, in Washington. They did not have any children, but her children from previous marriages took his last name.

== Civil War service ==
As early as 1860, she foresaw the approaching struggle, the Civil War being about to start, and began collecting and preparing articles for hospital use. At the beginning of the war, she cared for sick and wounded soldiers at the Battle of Shiloh at Pittsburg Landing, Tennessee and other battlefield sites. The government placed an ambulance at her command, and during the war she assisted in hospitals in the neighborhood of Washington, at Fredericksburg, Virginia, on the Peninsula, and elsewhere.

She pitched a large tent in the yard of her home and used it as a place to care for sick and disabled soldiers until they could be sent home. For some time, Fales was charged by the government with the superintendence of soldiers sent from the hospitals in and around Washington to hospitals in New York and elsewhere.
