= Fail, Viseu =

Coordinates: 40.6078636°N 7.9770136°W

Fail was a Portuguese parish in the municipality of Viseu, with 6.92 km^{2} (2.7 sq mi) and 664 inhabitants (2011). Density: 96 inhabitants / km^{2} (245/sq mi).

In 2013 Law No 11-A / 2013 was changed and Fail was reclassified into the Union of Parishes Fail e Vila Chã de Sá based in Vila Chã de Sá.
