= Deonce Whitaker =

American gridiron football player (born 1978)

Profile
- Position: Running back

Personal information
- Born: October 25, 1978 (age 48); Las Vegas, Nevada, U.S.

Career information
- High school: Rancho Cucamonga High School
- College: San Jose State

Career history
- 2002: BC Lions
- 2003: Montreal Alouettes
- 2003: Winnipeg Blue Bombers

Career statistics
- Rushing yards: 634
- Yards per carry: 4.56
- Rushing TDs: 4
- Receptions: 21
- Receiving yards: 238

Deonce Terrell Whitaker (born October 25, 1978) is a former running back in the Canadian Football League (CFL). He played for the BC Lions, Montreal Alouettes and Winnipeg Blue Bombers. He played college football for the San Jose State Spartans.

Born in Las Vegas, Nevada, Whitaker graduated from Rancho Cucamonga High School in Rancho Cucamonga, California in 1997.
