= Thomas Fale =

English mathematician

Thomas Fale (/feɪl/; fl. 1604) was an English mathematician.

== Life ==
Fale matriculated as a sizar of Gonville and Caius College, Cambridge, in November 1578, removed to Corpus Christi College, Cambridge in 1582, went out B.A. in 1582–3, commenced M.A. in 1586, proceeded B.D. in 1597, and in 1604 had a licence from the university to practise medicine.

== Publications ==
His only known publication is Horologiographia (1593). It is dedicated in Latin to all lovers of mathematics in the University of Cambridge. There is also a prefatory letter to 'my loving kinsman,’ Thomas Osborne, who had invented the instrument mentioned in the beginning of the book 'for the triall of plats,’ dated from London, 3 January 1593. The table of sines which it contains is probably the earliest specimen of a trigonometrical table printed in England.
