= Steve Clarkson =

American football player and coach (born 1961)

Personal information
- Born: October 31, 1961 (age 65); Los Angeles, California, U.S.
- Listed height: 6 ft 0 in (1.83 m)
- Listed weight: 205 lb (93 kg)

Career information
- High school: Wilson (Los Angeles, California)
- College: San Jose State

Career history
- 1983–1984: Saskatchewan Roughriders (CFL)

Career statistics
- Passes attempted-pass completed: 1-4
- Percentage: 25.0%
- Passing yards: 0
- TD–INT: 0-0
- Passer rating: 92.9

Steven Levert "Steve" Clarkson (born October 31, 1961) is an American football coach. Based in Pasadena, California, he is considered a top quarterback coach. Clarkson has tutored Ben Roethlisberger, Brett Hundley, Matt Leinart, J. P. Losman, Gino Torretta, Matt Barkley, Tim Tebow, Josh Freeman, and Jimmy Clausen, among others. Clarkson is also known for helping to get offers for David Sills from University of Southern California and Tate Martell from the University of Washington at ages of 13. David Sills currently plays for the Atlanta Falcons after signing as a UDFA.

== Early life ==
Clarkson is a 1979 graduate of Woodrow Wilson High School in Los Angeles, where he led its team to three Los Angeles City Championships with a 39-1 record during three seasons. Clarkson was named to the All-City teams during his junior and senior seasons, and was the All-City Player of the Year in 1978 after leading the state in passing yards and total offense.

== College career ==
Clarkson later was a three-year starter for coach Jack Elway at San José State University, where he holds several passing records and was named to the Academic All-American teams in 1981 and 1982.

After going undrafted in the 1983 NFL draft, Clarkson played a season for the Denver Broncos and two seasons for the Canadian Football League's Saskatchewan Roughriders in 1983 and 1984. He then became a district manager for a steakhouse chain, before turning to football coaching.

== Coaching ==
=== Programs ===
Clarkson initially founded "Air 7", a quarterback academy, that offers tutoring to players in high school and younger. Clarkson has since coached more than 200 Division I-A quarterback starters. Including other positions, Air 7 has produced about 80 I-A starters.

Clarkson's quarterback academy is now called Steve Clarkson Dreammaker. Initially offering quarterback training to youth, high school and college players, Clarkson soon began to train professional players as well. Clarkson has since been described by ESPN as "the most powerful QB coach in football."

Clarkson organizes various football camps and programs, such as the Super 7 program held in different cities. His training has been noted for involving significant classroom sessions in addition to on-field training.

=== Controversy ===
Clarkson was featured in a CBS "60 Minutes" segment by Morley Safer. The segment aired on a December 22, 2013 episode. During the segment, Safer featured the potential moral implications of creating a business such as Clarkson's "Dreammaker" quarterback camps. Those implications included the question of whether children as young as seven should be intensively training to become college quarterbacks and whether the parents of young children should be investing large sums of money in Clarkson's tutelage. In the segment, Clarkson admitted he did not want his own 10-year-old son to play football. While many of Clarkson's successful former students were featured, none of Clarkson's unsuccessful students were interviewed or even mentioned.

Mike Forcier, the father of a former student Tate Forcier, alleged that Clarkson "was more into promoting than coaching... It's like a big cattle call. That's what it is. It's all about promoting his guys and himself."

Clarkson at one point had fifty kids in private group training that cost $7,400 a year, although add-ons often took the tabs into five figures. He also works with more than 200 other players through camps and semi-private clinics. Clarkson will do a full 12-hour session over two days for an out-of-state QB that costs $3,000 plus expenses.

Clarkson is also self-styled as a recruiting middle man. Forbes Magazine quoted Clarkson as saying "Kids are on the cusp of getting scholarships before high school and it is all because of the Sills story, I guess I'm the person who started this whole madness."

=== Notable trainees ===
Clarkson has developed quarterbacks including Heisman Trophy-winner Matt Leinart and Matt Barkley. Other clients include Jimmy Clausen, Ben Roethlisberger, and Matt Cassel. A protégé of Clarkson's, David Sills, verbally committed to USC at the age of 13. Another student, Tate Martell, verbally committed to the University of Washington at age 14. Clarkson also currently works with the following talent at the collegiate level, Max Wittek at the University of Hawaii, and Wilton Speight, University of Michigan.
