= Sheldon Canley =

American football player (born 1968)

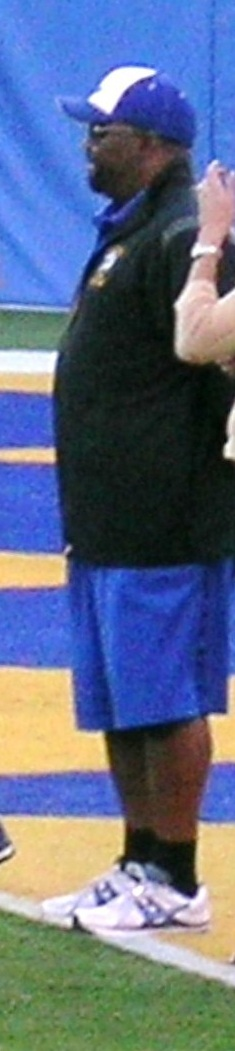
- Canley in 2010

No. 20, 21
- Position: Running back

Personal information
- Born: April 19, 1968 (age 58); Santa Barbara, California, U.S.
- Listed height: 5 ft 9 in (1.75 m)
- Listed weight: 195 lb (88 kg)

Career information
- High school: Lompoc (CA)
- College: San Jose State
- NFL draft: 1991: 7th round, 193rd overall pick

Career history
- San Francisco 49ers (1991–1992); New York Jets (1992); San Francisco 49ers (1993)*; Baltimore Stallions (1994); Denver Broncos (1995)*
- * Offseason or practice squad member only

Awards and highlights
- Third-team All-American (1990); NCAA record for most touchdowns/points scored in a bowl game

Career NFL statistics
- Rushing yards: 9
- Rushing average: 2.3
- Stats at Pro Football Reference

Sheldon Lavell Canley (born April 19, 1968) is an American former professional American football player who was a running back in the National Football League (NFL). He played college football for the San Jose State Spartans, earning third-team All-American honors in 1990. He played in the NFL for the San Francisco 49ers and the New York Jets.

== Early life ==
Canley was born in Santa Barbara, California and grew up in Lompoc, California, where he graduated from Lompoc High School. He attended Allan Hancock College in Santa Maria, California where he earned an Associate of Arts degree in Liberal Arts. He then attended San José State University. At the end of his NCAA career in 1991, Canley was selected to play in both the East West Shrine Game and the Blue–Gray Football Classic all-star games.

=== College statistics ===
Year	Team	Games	Rushing				Receiving			
Year	Team	Games	Att	Yards	Avg	TD	Rec	Yards	Avg	TD
1988	San Jose State	12	22	64	2.9	2	11	89	8.1	0
1989	San Jose State	11	258	1,201	4.7	13	42	353	8.4	1
1990	San Jose State	12	296	1,248	4.2	12	31	386	12.5	2
Career		35	576	2,513	4.4	27	84	828	9.9	3

== Professional career ==
Projected to be drafted higher, Canley was chosen by the San Francisco 49ers in the seventh round of the 1991 NFL draft after severely injuring his hamstring muscle during the SJSU pro day. After spending his first season on injured reserve, Canley was eventually released, in part due to stiff competition in a 49ers offensive backfield that included former first-round pick Dexter Carter, Tom Rathman, and 1992 Pro-Bowler Ricky Watters (a fellow 1991 49ers draftee who coincidentally also sat out his entire rookie season due to injury).

Canley was signed off of waivers from the 49ers by the New York Jets. He would play in his only NFL regular season game with the Jets, rushing four times for nine yards in a 20-0 loss to the New Orleans Saints on 26 December 1992.

Canley was part of the 1994 Baltimore Stallions of the Canadian Football League, which eventually lost the Grey Cup game to the BC Lions, 23-20. Playing behind starter Mike Pringle, during the regular season Canley rushed 31 times for 143 yards and one touchdown, as well as caught six passes for 37 yards. He also made 13 tackles, mostly on special teams.

In 1995, Canley signed with the Denver Broncos of the NFL but was released after the pre-season. Again, strong competition from fellow running backs played a large part in his release; this time his teammates included 1995 Pro-Bowler Glyn Milburn and then-unknown rookie Terrell Davis.
