= Scott Rislov =

American football player (born 1980)

No. 7
- Position: Quarterback

Personal information
- Born: June 26, 1980 (age 46); Pierre, South Dakota, U.S.
- Listed height: 6 ft 1 in (1.85 m)
- Listed weight: 220 lb (100 kg)

Career information
- College: San Jose State

Career history
- 2005: Sioux Falls Storm
- 2005: Nashville Kats
- 2006: Central Valley Coyotes
- 2008: San Jose SaberCats

Awards and highlights
- ArenaBowl champion (2007)

Scott Allen Rislov (born June 26, 1980) is an American former professional football quarterback who played in the Arena Football League (AFL).

== Early life ==
Rislov was born in Pierre, South Dakota to Greg and Diane Rislov and is of Norwegian descent. He graduated from T. F. Riggs High School in Pierre in 1999. As a quarterback at Riggs, Rislov was twice an all-league selection and in his senior year (1998) an honorable mention All-America pick by USA Today. In addition to football, Rislov played basketball at Riggs.

== College career ==
After redshirting his freshman year, Rislov played six games in 2000 with the University of North Dakota Fighting Sioux football team. In 2001, Rislov transferred to Ellsworth Community College in Iowa. He was named Honorable Mention All-American by the NJCAA that year. From 2002 to 2003, Rislov was the starting quarterback for the San Jose State Spartans. In 2004, Rislov graduated from San Jose State University with a Bachelor of Science degree in psychology.

== Professional career ==
Rislov tried out with the Cincinnati Bengals but never played, before moving on to the Sioux Falls Storm, Nashville Kats, Central Valley Coyotes, and the San Jose SaberCats. While playing for the af2 Coyotes in 2006, he threw a league-record 106 touchdown passes.

== After football ==
Rislov worked as a sales representative with Realm Communications Group from 2007 to 2009, then with that company as an account manager and sales manager. In August 2011, Rislov earned his Master's in Business Administration from San Jose State.

He has worked at Bay Area Security Firm, Proofpoint, where he has worked with the firm's largest Higher Education Institutions.
