= Frank Manumaleuna =

American football player (1956–2022)

No. 54
- Position: Linebacker

Personal information
- Born: May 9, 1956; Salelavalu, Savaiʻi, Western Samoa
- Died: June 1, 2022 (aged 66); Las Vegas, Nevada, U.S.
- Listed height: 6 ft 2 in (1.88 m)
- Listed weight: 245 lb (111 kg)

Career information
- High school: Phineas Banning (Los Angeles, California, U.S.)
- College: San Jose State
- NFL draft: 1979: 4th round, 85th overall pick

Career history
- Kansas City Chiefs (1979–1981); Oakland Invaders (1983–1984); Portland Breakers (1985)

Awards and highlights
- Third-team All-American (1978); Second-team All-Coast (1977)

Career NFL statistics
- Interceptions: 6
- Touchdowns: 1
- Stats at Pro Football Reference

Toto'a Frank Manumaleuna (MAH-noo-MAH-lay-OOO-nah; born Toto'a Frank Manumaleuga; May 9, 1956 – June 1, 2022) was a Western Samoan-American professional football linebacker who played three seasons with the Kansas City Chiefs of the National Football League (NFL). He was selected by the Chiefs in the fourth round of the 1979 NFL draft. He played college football at the University of California, Los Angeles, De Anza College, and San José State University. He was also a member of the Oakland Invaders and Portland Breakers of the United States Football League (USFL).

== Early life ==
Toto'a Frank Manumaleuga was born in Salelavalu, on the island of Savaiʻi in Western Samoa. He moved to the Territory of Hawaii at a young age. He did not receive his birth certificate until 1959, when Hawaii became a U.S. state. Manumaleuna's family shortly thereafter moved to southern California. He started going by Frank after a teacher had difficulty pronouncing his given name of Toto'a. A teacher also misspelled his last name as Manumaleuna instead of Manumaleuga, so he started going by Manumaleuna as well. He participated in high school football, basketball, baseball and track at Phineas Banning High School in Los Angeles, California.

== College career ==
Manumaleuna sustained a spine and neck injury during his only game for the UCLA Bruins as a freshman in 1974 in Knoxville during a 17–17 tie with the Tennessee Volunteers. However, he earned Chevrolet Player of the Game honors after making 25 tackles during the game. He also played one year of basketball for the Bruins. However, the UCLA medical staff would not clear him to resume football activities.

Manumaleuna then played two years of college football at De Anza College and averaged fifteen yards per carry as a fullback. He transferred to play for the San Jose State Spartans from 1977 to 1978. He was inducted into the San Jose State University Sports Hall of Fame.

== Professional career ==
Manumaleuna was selected by the Kansas City Chiefs of the NFL in the fourth round with the 85th pick in the 1979 NFL draft. He played in 35 games, starting 29, for the Chiefs from 1979 to 1981. He played in 36 games, all starts, for the USFL's Oakland Invaders from 1983 to 1984. Manumaleuna played for the Portland Breakers of the USFL during the 1985 season.

== Personal life ==
Manumaleuna’s son Brandon Manumaleuna also played in the NFL. Frank's nephew Eathyn Manumaleuna spent time during the 2014 off-season with the New York Giants and New England Patriots. Frank died on June 1, 2022, in Las Vegas, Nevada.
