= Adam Tafralis =

American gridiron football player (born 1983)

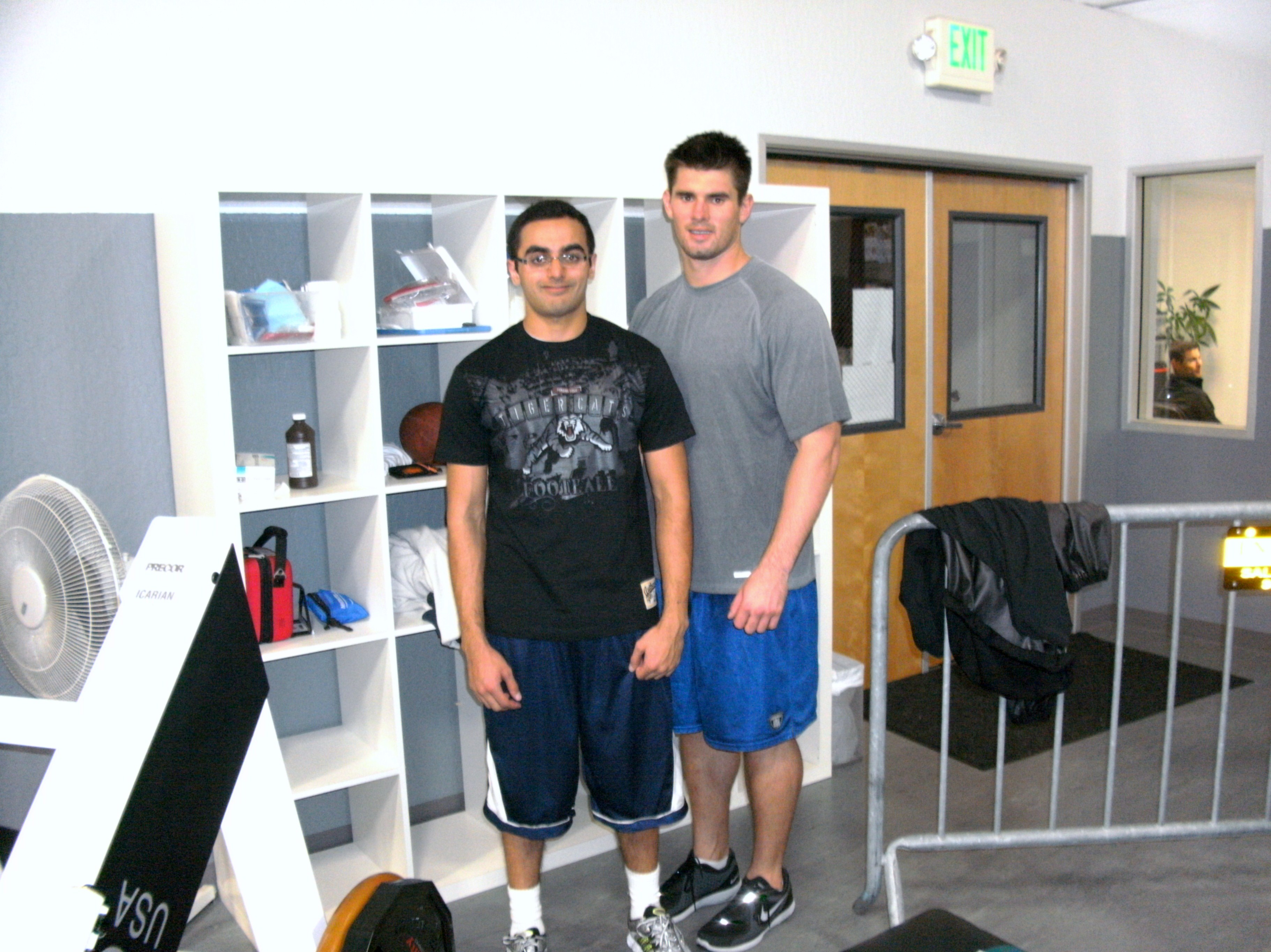
- Tafralis (right) in 2009

No. 17
- Position: Quarterback

Personal information
- Born: August 30, 1983 (age 43); Daly City, California, U.S.
- Listed height: 6 ft 1 in (1.85 m)
- Listed weight: 219 lb (99 kg)

Career information
- College: San Jose State
- NFL draft: 2008: undrafted

Career history
- Indianapolis Colts (2008)*; Hamilton Tiger-Cats (2008–2010); Sacramento Mountain Lions (2011)*; Toronto Argonauts (2012)*
- * Offseason or practice squad member only
- Stats at CFL.ca (archive)

Adam Gregory Tafralis (born August 30, 1983) is an American former professional football quarterback. He was signed by the Indianapolis Colts as an undrafted free agent in 2008. He played college football at San Jose State University.

He was also a member of the Hamilton Tiger-Cats, Sacramento Mountain Lions and Toronto Argonauts.

== Early life ==
Tafralis attended Mills High School in Millbrae, California where he starred in football, basketball, and track and field. He was the 2002 San Mateo County athlete of the year his senior year.

== College career ==
He played college football at San Jose State, where he was the starting quarterback from the 2004–2007 seasons. This included the 2006 season, where he led the Spartans to the 2006 New Mexico Bowl, and set many records in passing which still remain unsurpassed. Tafralis graduated from San Jose State in December 2007 with a B.S. in kinesiology.

== Professional career ==
=== Indianapolis Colts ===
Tafralis was signed by the Indianapolis Colts after going undrafted in 2008. He was later released after not playing, and signed with the Hamilton Tiger-Cats of the Canadian Football League.

=== Hamilton Tiger-Cats ===
Tafralis saw his first action on October 24, 2008, throwing a touchdown pass to Prechae Rodriguez late in the 4th quarter of a home game vs. the Calgary Stampeders. On September 18, 2009, he again saw action against Calgary late in the game, throwing a touchdown pass to Arland Bruce III to give the Tiger-Cats the win.

He was cut in April 2011 by the Ticats and became a free agent.

=== Sacramento Mountain Lions ===
After his release from Hamilton, Tafralis signed with the United Football League's Sacramento Mountain Lions.

=== Toronto Argonauts ===
On February 16, 2012, he was signed to the Toronto Argonauts of the CFL.

On May 30, 2012, he announced his retirement from football.

== Personal life ==
His father Gregg, was an Olympic shotputter who competed in the 1992 Olympics, and also held the world title in the early '90s. During the 2010 offseason, Tafralis worked as a trainer for John Paye at Paye's Sports Performance in San Carlos, CA.

Preceded by Dale Rogers	San Jose State Spartans starting quarterbacks 2004–2007	Succeeded by Myles Eden
