= Mike Perez (American football) =

American football player (born 1963)

No. 11
- Position: Quarterback

Personal information
- Born: March 7, 1965 (age 61); Denver, Colorado, U.S.
- Listed height: 6 ft 1 in (1.85 m)
- Listed weight: 210 lb (95 kg)

Career information
- High school: South (Denver)
- College: San Jose State (1985–1987)
- NFL draft: 1988: 7th round, 175th overall pick

Career history
- New York Giants (1988); Houston Oilers (1990)*; Frankfurt Galaxy (1991); New York Giants (1991)*; Kansas City Chiefs (1991)*; New York Giants (1991); Frankfurt Galaxy (1992); Denver Broncos (1993)*; Albany Firebirds (1994–1996); New York CityHawks/New England Sea Wolves (1997–1999)
- * Offseason or practice squad member only

Awards and highlights
- 3× Second-team All-Arena (1994, 1995, 1996); Pop Warner Trophy (1987)

Career AFL statistics
- Comp. / Att.: 1,384 / 2,378
- Passing yards: 18,875
- TD–INT: 341–84
- QB rating: 104.79
- Rushing TD: 17
- Stats at ArenaFan.com

Michael Paul Perez (born March 7, 1963) is an American former professional football player who was a quarterback in the Arena Football League (AFL). He played college football for the San Jose State Spartans was selected by the New York Giants of the National Football League (NFL) in the seventh round of the 1988 NFL draft. Perez was also a member of the Houston Oilers, Frankfurt Galaxy, Kansas City Chiefs, Denver Broncos. He played in the AFL for the Albany Firebirds, New York CityHawks and New England Sea Wolves

== Early life and college ==
Born and raised in Denver, Perez graduated from Denver South High School in 1983 and attended Taft Junior College in California. In 1985, Perez transferred to San Jose State University. He became starting quarterback in 1986 after redshirting the 1985 season. Perez led the Spartans to the Pacific Coast Athletic Association conference championship and briefly garnered national media attention.

== Professional career ==
=== New York Giants ===
Perez was selected by the New York Giants in the seventh round (175th overall) of the 1988 NFL draft. On injured reserve with a pulled stomach muscle (September 19, 1988-remainder of season). He was released by the team on August 23, 1989.

=== Houston Oilers ===
Perez was signed by the Houston Oilers on May 14, 1990. He was released on August 6.

=== Frankfurt Galaxy ===
Perez signed with the World League of American Football on January 31, 1991. He was selected by the Frankfurt Galaxy in the first round (third quarterback) of the 1991 WLAF positional draft.

Perez was the starting quarterback in all ten regular season games, completing 171 of 357 passes for 2,272 yards and 13 touchdowns. He also rushed 44 times for 189 yards, resulting in a team-leading 4.3 average. Perez suffered only 19 sacks (2nd lowest in the World League) for 115 negative yards and was intercepted 17 times. His best games were at New York/New Jersey where he threw for three touchdowns with a 61 percent completion rate, and at Orlando, where he passed for 346 yards including a 59-yard hurl to Jason Johnson.

Perez was also the leading passer for Frankfurt in 1992.

=== Denver Broncos ===
Perez was signed by the Denver Broncos on April 28, 1993. He was released on August 30.

=== Arena Football ===
From 1994–1996 Perez played for the Albany Firebirds, leading the league in touchdowns each year, and earning 2nd team All-Arena honors all three seasons. In 1997 and 1998 he played for the New York CityHawks, as well as in 1999 when the team moved and became the New England Sea Wolves.

=== Life after football ===
Perez currently works in Finance as a Loan Officer at Megastar Financial Corp. Perez is active in the Denver community and serves on the Board of the Colorado Golf Association.

== See also ==
- List of NCAA major college football yearly passing leaders
- List of NCAA major college football yearly total offense leaders
