= Dwight Lowery =

American football player (born 1986)

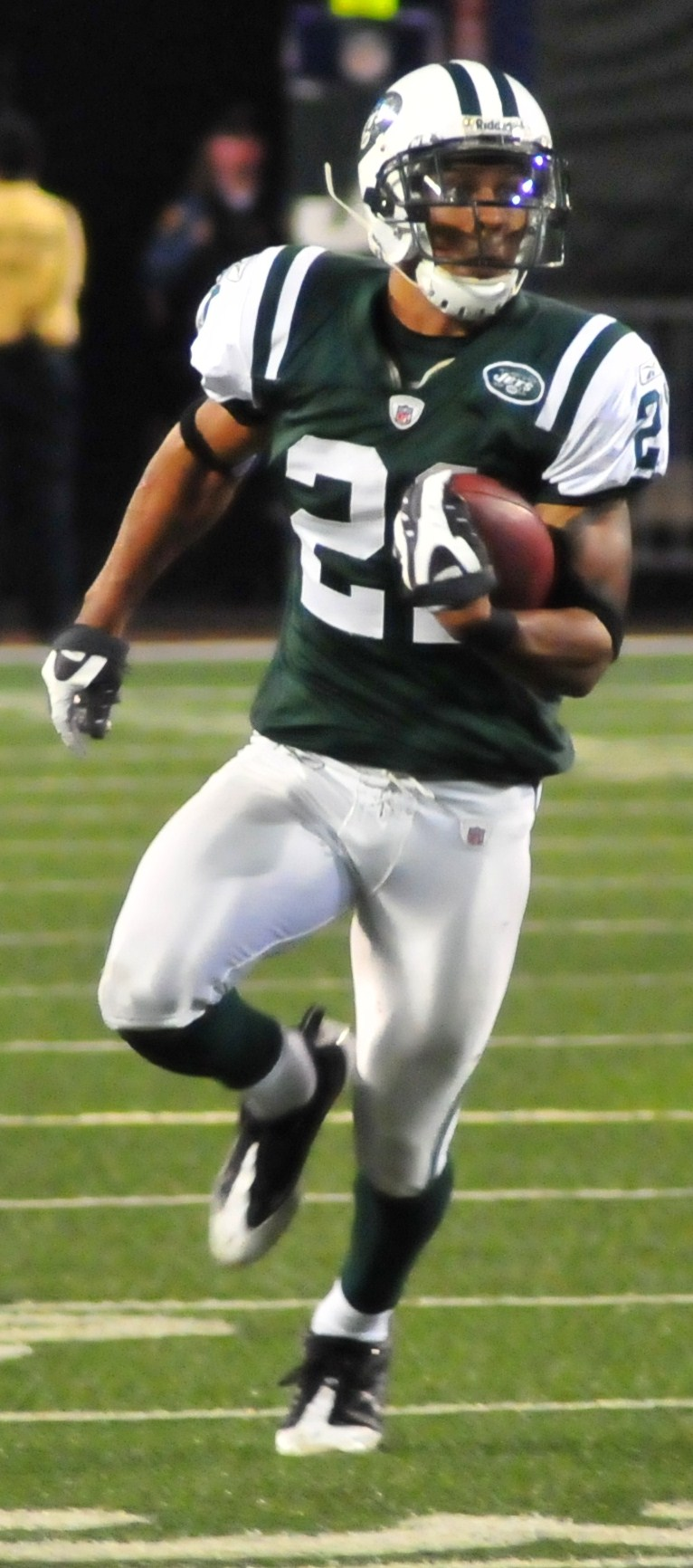
- Lowery with the New York Jets in 2009

No. 34, 21, 26, 25, 20, 33
- Position: Safety

Personal information
- Born: January 23, 1986 (age 40); Santa Cruz, California, U.S.
- Listed height: 5 ft 11 in (1.80 m)
- Listed weight: 212 lb (96 kg)

Career information
- High school: Soquel (CA)
- College: San Jose State
- NFL draft: 2008: 4th round, 113th overall pick

Career history
- New York Jets (2008–2010); Jacksonville Jaguars (2011–2013); Atlanta Falcons (2014); Indianapolis Colts (2015); San Diego Chargers (2016)

Awards and highlights
- 2× First-team All-American (2006, 2007)

Career NFL statistics
- Total tackles: 395
- Sacks: 5.0
- Pass deflections: 67
- Interceptions: 17
- Forced fumbles: 8
- Defensive touchdowns: 3
- Stats at Pro Football Reference

Dwight Larte Lowery (born January 23, 1986) is an American former professional football player who was a safety in the National Football League (NFL). He was selected by the New York Jets in the fourth round of the 2008 NFL draft. He played college football for the San Jose State Spartans.

== Early life ==
Lowery attended Soquel High School in Soquel, California where he was an All Santa Cruz Coast Athletic League running back for the Knights during his senior year. Lowery broke the school's scoring record for a single season (25 touchdowns) and the County's single game scoring record (7 TD; 5 rushing, 1 receiving and a returned interception for the games final he earned All-League defensive back his junior and senior year having 20 interceptions in 20 games.

Lowery also played basketball and was a 3-year starter on the varsity squad. He earned league MVP honors his junior year, and lead his team into the Central Coast Section Playoffs.

== College career ==
=== Cabrillo College ===
Lowery previously attended Cabrillo College in Aptos, California where he played free safety and special teams for the Seahawks. During Lowery's Freshman season at Cabrillo College, he received All State defensive back honors and lead California in INTs (9). His Sophomore season was cut short with a hand injury but he still managed four more interceptions in the games following the injury. He left Cabrillo with 13 picks in 15 games. He also led the state in return yards in 2004.

=== San Jose State ===
Lowery after San Jose State's 2006 victory over Stanford.

Lowery was a two-time All-America selection AFCA and FWAA All-America cornerback for San Jose State University. Lowery led the nation in 2006 with 9 interceptions. In his senior season at San Jose State University Lowery recorded 4 interceptions and was named to the all-WAC team in 2007. In the post-season 83rd East–West Shrine Game, Lowery had 2 interceptions.

Lowery had applied for a draft grade from the NFL's advisory committee following the 2006 season but decided that he would return in 2007 for his Senior season at SJSU.

=== Awards and honors ===
- Named to the 2007 Playboy All-American Team.
- Named to the 2006 and 2007 AFCA All-America Team
- Named to the 2007 Scout.com All-America Third-team
- Earned All-WAC first-team Honors in 2007
- Became the first player in San Jose State University history to be named an All-American in back-to-back years.
- Named to 83rd East-West Shrine All-Star Game in 2008

== Professional career ==
Pre-draft measurables
Height	Weight	40-yard dash	10-yard split	20-yard split	20-yard shuttle	Three-cone drill	Vertical jump	Broad jump	Bench press
5 ft 11 in (1.80 m)	201 lb (91 kg)	4.54 s	1.53 s	2.60 s	4.38 s	7.31 s	33.5 in (0.85 m)	9 ft 8 in (2.95 m)	16 reps

=== New York Jets ===
Impressed with Lowery's versatility and ball skills, the New York Jets selected him in the fourth round (113th overall) of the 2008 NFL draft as a cornerback/safety. An injury to cornerback Justin Miller would see Lowery debut in his first NFL game against the Miami Dolphins; Lowery performed modestly with four tackles and three passes defensed. Lowery was named to the NFL's mid-season all-rookie team for his efforts on defense however in November, Lowery was benched in favor of veteran Ty Law. In spite of the benching, Lowery continued to improve and contribute as a backup cornerback earning the praise of his head coach Eric Mangini and his teammates.

In 2009, Lowery continued to contribute as a backup and would finish the season with 24 tackles, 9 passes defensed and 3 interceptions.

In 2010, Lowery would record his first career touchdown, intercepting Brett Favre on a play that would seal the Jets' victory over the Vikings.

=== Jacksonville Jaguars ===
Lowery was traded to the Jacksonville Jaguars for an undisclosed draft pick on September 3, 2011. In his first game with Jacksonville, Lowery intercepted a Matt Hasselbeck pass to seal a Jaguar victory.

On March 13, 2012, Lowery agreed to a four-year extension with the Jaguars. He was placed on season-ending injured reserve on December 22, 2012.

In week 2 of the 2012 season during the Jaguars home opener loss to the Houston Texans, Lowery tackled a fan who ran onto the field.

Lowery's 2013 season ended when he was placed on injured reserve on October 8. He was released from injured reserve on November 4.

=== Atlanta Falcons ===
Lowery signed with the Atlanta Falcons on April 8, 2014. Lowery helped contribute to a struggling Atlanta Falcons defense in 2014. Lowery replaced old Atlanta Falcons Free Safety Thomas Decoud and did an outstanding job.

=== Indianapolis Colts ===
Lowery signed with the Indianapolis Colts on April 3, 2015.

=== San Diego Chargers ===
On March 9, 2016, Lowery signed a three-year contract with the San Diego Chargers. Lowery was signed to fill any empty void previously filled by All-Pro safety Eric Weddle.

On September 2, 2017, Lowery was released by the Chargers.

=== NFL statistics ===
Year	Team	GP	COMB	TOTAL	AST	SACK	FF	FR	FR YDS	INT	IR YDS	AVG IR	LNG	TD	PD
2008	NYJ	16	64	54	10	0.0	5	0	0	1	0	0	0	0	16
2009	NYJ	13	24	22	2	0.0	0	1	0	3	41	13.7	34	0	9
2010	NYJ	14	19	16	3	2.0	0	2	2	3	87	29.0	41	2	7
2011	JAX	13	36	28	8	1.0	0	1	23	2	26	13.0	30	0	8
2012	JAX	9	31	26	5	0.0	0	1	0	1	21	21.0	21	0	4
2013	JAX	3	6	4	2	0.0	0	1	0	0	0	0	0	0	1
2014	ATL	16	79	60	19	1.0	2	1	0	2	21	10.5	21	0	5
2015	IND	16	76	56	20	1.0	0	0	0	4	96	24.0	69	1	8
2016	SD	16	60	49	11	0.0	1	1	36	1	25	25.0	25	0	9
Career		116	395	315	80	5.0	8	8	61	17	317	18.6	69	3	68

== Post-playing career ==
In 2018, Lowery was named the head football coach at Soquel High School, his alma mater.

== Personal life ==
Lowery was born to Tracy Rivers who raised him as single mother. Lowery has six other siblings, including a sister, Aujanae. Lowery is married to his wife, Ashley Lowery.
