= Rice Owls football statistical leaders =

The Rice Owls football statistical leaders are individual statistical leaders of the Rice Owls football program in various categories, including passing, rushing, total offense, and receiving, defensive stats, and kicking. Within those areas, the lists identify single-game, single-season, and career leaders. The Owls represent Rice University in the NCAA Division I FBS American Conference.

Although Rice began competing in intercollegiate football in 1912, the school's official record book considers the "modern era" to have begun in 1951. Records from before this year are often incomplete and inconsistent, and they are generally not included in these lists.

These lists are dominated by more recent players for several reasons:

- Since 1951, seasons have increased from 10 games to 11 and then 12 games in length.
- The NCAA didn't allow freshmen to play varsity football until 1972 (with the exception of the World War II years), allowing players to have four-year careers.
- Bowl games only began counting toward single-season and career statistics in 2002. The Owls have played in 5 bowl games since this decision, allowing players to accumulate additional statistics in the extra game.
- All of Rice's top 10 seasons by offensive yards and scoring have come since the 2001 season.

These lists are updated through the end of the 2025 season.

== Passing ==
=== Passing yards ===
Career
Rank	Player	Yards	Years
1	Chase Clement	9,785	2005 2006 2007 2008
2	Tommy Kramer	6,197	1973 1974 1975 1976
3	Randy Hertel	6,161	1977 1978 1979 1980
4	Taylor McHargue	6,122	2010 2011 2012 2013
5	Driphus Jackson	5,912	2012 2013 2014 2015
6	Mark Comalander	4,810	1984 1985 1986 1987
7	Nick Fanuzzi	4,402	2009 2010 2011
8	Donald Hollas	4,039	1987 1988 1989 1990
9	Quentis Roper	3,895	1985 1986 1987 1988
10	Bruce Gadd	3,454	1970 1971 1972

Single-season
Rank	Player	Yards	Year
1	Chase Clement	4,119	2008
2	Chase Clement	3,377	2007
3	Tommy Kramer	3,317	1976
4	Driphus Jackson	2,842	2014
5	E.J. Warner	2,710	2024
6	JT Daniels	2,443	2023
7	Driphus Jackson	2,348	2015
8	Taylor McHargue	2,345	2013
9	Taylor McHargue	2,209	2012
10	TJ McMahon	2,102	2022

Single game
Rank	Player	Yards	Year	Opponent
1	Chase Clement	541	2007	Tulsa
2	Chase Clement	444	2008	Southern Miss
3	JT Daniels	432	2023	South Florida
4	E.J. Warner	430	2024	South Florida
5	Tommy Kramer	409	1976	Houston
6	Tyler Stehling	407	2016	Prairie View A&M
7	Nick Fanuzzi	405	2011	UTEP
8	JT Daniels	401	2023	Houston
9	Tommy Kramer	397	1976	Texas
10	Chase Clement	395	2007	UTEP

=== Passing touchdowns ===
Career
Rank	Player	TDs	Years
1	Chase Clement	99	2005 2006 2007 2008
2	Driphus Jackson	48	2012 2013 2014 2015
3	Taylor McHargue	43	2010 2011 2012 2013
4	Randy Hertel	38	1977 1978 1979 1980
5	Tommy Kramer	37	1973 1974 1975 1976
6	Mark Comalander	27	1984 1985 1986 1987
7	Michael Calhoun	26	1981 1982
8	Quentis Roper	23	1985 1986 1987 1988
	Josh LaRocca	23	1991 1992 1993 1994 1995
10	Nick Fanuzzi	22	2009 2010 2011

Single-season
Rank	Player	TDs	Year
1	Chase Clement	44	2008
2	Chase Clement	29	2007
3	Driphus Jackson	24	2014
4	Michael Calhoun	21	1981
	Tommy Kramer	21	1976
	Chase Clement	21	2006
	JT Daniels	21	2023
8	Driphus Jackson	18	2015
	TJ McMahon	18	2022
10	Taylor McHargue	17	2013
	E.J. Warner	17	2024

Single game
Rank	Player	TDs	Year	Opponent
1	Chase Clement	6	2007	UTEP
	Chase Clement	6	2008	SMU
	Chase Clement	6	2008	Southern Miss
4	Chase Clement	5	2006	Army
	Chase Clement	5	2008	UTEP
	Chase Clement	5	2008	Houston
	Tyler Stehling	5	2016	Prairie View A&M
8	Vernon Glass	4	1950	Santa Clara
	Tommy Kramer	4	1976	Utah
	Michael Calhoun	4	1981	TCU
	Michael Calhoun	4	1981	Texas Tech
	Michael Calhoun	4	1981	Texas A&M
	Chase Clement	4	2008	Marshall
	Taylor McHargue	4	2013	UTEP
	Driphus Jackson	4	2014	Louisiana Tech
	Mike Collins	4	2020	Middle Tennessee
	Mike Collins	4	2020	Southern Mississippi
	TJ McMahon	4	2022	McNeese
	JT Daniels	4	2023	Texas Southern

== Rushing ==
=== Rushing yards ===
Career
Rank	Player	Yards	Years
1	Trevor Cobb	4,948	1989 1990 1991 1992
2	Charles Ross	2,689	2009 2010 2011 2012 2013
3	Quinton Smith	2,505	2003 2004 2005 2006
4	Michael Perry	2,496	1995 1996
5	Chad Nelson	2,415	1994 1995 1996 1997
6	Robbie Beck	2,218	2000 2001 2002 2003
7	Darik Dillard	2,198	2013 2014 2015 2016
8	Kyle Herm	2,028	2000 2001 2002 2003
9	Chad Richardson	2,024	1996 1997 1998 1999
10	Greg Henderson	1,995	2001 2002 2003 2004

Single-season
Rank	Player	Yards	Year
1	Trevor Cobb	1,692	1991
2	Trevor Cobb	1,386	1992
3	Trevor Cobb	1,325	1990
4	Charles Ross	1,270	2013
5	Quinton Smith	1,096	2006
6	Michael Perry	1,034	1997
7	Ed Bailey	1,021	2004
8	Jowan Davis	956	2014
9	Chad Nelson	953	1997
10	Stahle Vincent	945	1971

Single game
Rank	Player	Yards	Year	Opponent
1	Dicky Maegle	265	1954	Alabama
2	Gael Ochoa	259	2026	Florida Atlantic
3	Antonio Brinkley	244	1985	Lamar
4	Trevor Cobb	240	1991	Iowa State
5	Ed Bailey	234	2004	Hawai`i
6	Chad Richardson	224	1998	Colorado State
7	Trevor Cobb	223	1992	Sam Houston State
8	Trevor Cobb	216	1991	Tulane
9	John Cardwell	215	1970	TCU
	Charles Ross	215	2013	Louisiana Tech

=== Rushing touchdowns ===
Career
Rank	Player	TDs	Years
1	Trevor Cobb	38	1989 1990 1991 1992
2	Charles Ross	36	2009 2010 2011 2012 2013
3	Robbie Beck	34	2000 2001 2002 2003
4	Chase Clement	25	2005 2006 2007 2008
5	Chad Nelson	24	1994 1995 1996 1997
6	Ed Bailey	22	2001 2002 2003 2004
	Benji Wood	22	1996 1997
	Darik Dillard	22	2013 2014 2015 2016
9	Chad Richardson	20	1996 1997 1998 1999
10	Donald Hollas	19	1987 1988 1989 1990

Single-season
Rank	Player	TDs	Year
1	Benjie Wood	16	1997
2	Charles Ross	15	2013
3	Trevor Cobb	14	1991
4	Ed Bailey	12	2004
	Chase Clement	12	2008
6	Dicky Maegle	11	1954
	Trevor Cobb	11	1992
	Chad Nelson	11	1996
	Chad Richardson	11	1999
	Kyle Herm	11	2001
	Taylor McHargue	11	2012
	Darik Dillard	11	2014

Single game
Rank	Player	TDs	Year	Opponent
1	Charles Ross	5	2013	Louisiana Tech
2	Dicky Maegle	4	1954	Cornell
	Butch Blume	4	1961	Texas Tech
	Lester Lehman	4	1967	Baylor
	Donald Hollas	4	1990	Texas Tech
	Benji Wood	4	1997	Tulane
	Robbie Beck	4	2003	Fresno State
	Ed Bailey	4	2004	SMU
	Jeremy Eddington	4	2010	East Carolina
	Jordan Myers	4	2021	Texas Southern
	Gael Ochoa	4	2026	Florida Atlantic

== Receiving ==
=== Receptions ===
Career
Rank	Player	Rec	Years
1	Jarett Dillard	292	2005 2006 2007 2008
2	Eric Henley	186	1988 1989 1990 1991
3	Jordan Taylor	176	2011 2012 2013 2014
4	Toren Dixon	161	2006 2007 2008 2009
5	James Casey	157	2007 2008
6	David Houser	152	1974 1976 1977 1978
7	Austin Trammell	142	2017 2018 2019 2020
8	Luke McCaffrey	129	2022 2023
9	Vance McDonald	119	2009 2010 2011 2012
10	Doug Cunningham	117	1975 1976 1977 1978

Single-season
Rank	Player	Rec	Year
1	James Casey	111	2008
2	Jarett Dillard	91	2006
3	Jarett Dillard	87	2008
4	Eric Henley	81	1989
5	Jarett Dillard	79	2007
6	James Sykes	76	1976
7	Luke McCaffrey	71	2023
8	Matt Sykes	65	2024
9	Aaron Turner	63	2025
10	Austin Trammell	62	2018
	Dean Connors	62	2024

Single game
Rank	Player	Rec	Year	Opponent
1	David Houser	14	1976	Florida

=== Receiving yards ===
Career
Rank	Player	Yards	Years
1	Jarett Dillard	4,138	2005 2006 2007 2008
2	Jordan Taylor	2,588	2011 2012 2013 2014
3	David Houser	2,358	1974 1976 1977 1978
4	Eric Henley	2,199	1988 1989 1990 1991
5	James Casey	1,914	2007 2008
6	Toren Dixon	1,746	2006 2007 2008 2009
7	Austin Trammell	1,744	2017 2018 2019 2020
8	Luke McCaffrey	1,715	2022 2023
9	Bradley Rozner	1,676	2019 2021 2022
10	Doug Cunningham	1,522	1975 1976 1977 1978

Single-season
Rank	Player	Yards	Year
1	James Casey	1,329	2008
2	Jarett Dillard	1,310	2008
3	Jarett Dillard	1,247	2006
4	Jarett Dillard	1,057	2007
5	Luke McCaffrey	992	2023
6	David Houser	931	1976
7	Eric Henley	900	1989
8	Bradley Rozner	876	2022
9	Jordan Taylor	848	2013
10	Jordan Taylor	842	2014

Single game
Rank	Player	Yards	Year	Opponent
1	James Casey	208	2008	Memphis
2	Luke McCaffrey	199	2023	South Florida
3	David Houser	196	1976	Florida
4	Jordan Taylor	185	2013	UTEP
5	Doug Cunningham	175	1976	TCU
6	James Casey	172	2008	Houston
7	Jarett Dillard	171	2006	Army
	Luke McCaffrey	171	2022	Louisiana Tech
9	David Houser	170	1976	Texas A&M
10	Ben Wiggins	168	2003	SMU
	Jarett Dillard	168	2007	UTEP

=== Receiving touchdowns ===
Career
Rank	Player	TDs	Years
1	Jarett Dillard	60	2005 2006 2007 2008
2	Jordan Taylor	20	2011 2012 2013 2014
3	Luke McCaffrey	19	2022 2023
4	David Houser	18	1974 1976 1977 1978
5	James Casey	17	2007 2008
6	Eric Henley	16	1988 1989 1990 1991
7	Kenneth Roy	15	1973 1974 1975 1976
	Vance McDonald	15	2009 2010 2011 2012
	Bradley Rozner	15	2019 2021 2022
10	Froggy Williams	13	1946 1947 1948 1949
	Buddy Dial	13	1956 1957 1958
	Toren Dixon	13	2006 2007 2008 2009
	Austin Trammell	13	2017 2018 2019 2020

Single-season
Rank	Player	TDs	Year
1	Jarett Dillard	21	2006
2	Jarett Dillard	20	2008
3	Jarett Dillard	14	2007
4	James Casey	13	2008
	Luke McCaffrey	13	2023
6	Bradley Rozner	10	2022
7	Kenneth Roy	9	1976
8	Vance McDonald	8	2010
	Jordan Taylor	8	2013
	Mario Hull	8	2014

Single game
Rank	Player	TDs	Year	Opponent
1	Jarett Dillard	4	2008	North Texas

== Total offense ==
Total offense is the sum of passing and rushing statistics. It does not include receiving or returns.

=== Total offense yards ===
Career
Rank	Player	Yards	Years
1	Chase Clement	11,526	2005 2006 2007 2008
2	Taylor McHargue	7,533	2010 2011 2012 2013
3	Driphus Jackson	6,716	2012 2013 2014 2015
4	Tommy Kramer	6,336	1973 1974 1975 1976
5	Randy Hertel	5,751	1977 1978 1979 1980
6	Trevor Cobb	4,948	1989 1990 1991 1992
7	Quentis Roper	4,924	1985 1986 1987 1988
8	Donald Hollas	4,832	1987 1988 1989 1990
9	Mark Comalander	4,561	1984 1985 1986 1987
10	Nick Fanuzzi	4,486	2009 2010 2011

Single season
Rank	Player	Yards	Year
1	Chase Clement	4,812	2008
2	Chase Clement	3,912	2007
3	Driphus Jackson	3,243	2014
4	Tommy Kramer	3,272	1976
5	Taylor McHargue	2,874	2012
6	Taylor McHargue	2,809	2013
7	E.J. Warner	2,722	2024
8	Driphus Jackson	2,509	2015
9	JT Daniels	2,378	2023
10	Tyler Stehling	2,358	2016

Single game
Rank	Player	Yards	Year	Opponent
1	Chase Clement	601	2007	Tulsa
2	Chase Clement	491	2007	UTEP
3	Chase Clement	488	2007	Memphis
4	Taylor McHargue	467	2012	Marshall
5	Chase Clement	466	2008	Southern Miss
6	Chase Clement	459	2008	Army
7	Chase Clement	439	2008	Houston
	Nick Fanuzzi	439	2011	UTEP
9	E.J. Warner	426	2024	South Florida
10	Tyler Stehling	412	2016	Prairie View A&M

=== Total touchdowns ===
Career
Rank	Player	TDs	Years
1	Chase Clement	124	2005 2006 2007 2008
2	Taylor McHargue	60	2010 2011 2012 2013
3	Driphus Jackson	54	2012 2013 2014 2015
4	Tommy Kramer	48	1973 1974 1975 1976
5	Randy Hertel	42	1977 1978 1979 1980
6	Trevor Cobb	38	1989 1990 1991 1992
	Mark Comalander	36	1984 1985 1986 1987
8	Charles Ross	36	2009 2010 2011 2012 2013
9	Kyle Herm	35	2000 2001 2002 2003
10	Donald Hollas	34	1987 1988 1989 1990
	Bert Emanuel	34	1992 1993
	Robbie Beck	34	2000 2001 2002 2003

Single season
Rank	Player	TDs	Year
1	Chase Clement	56	2008
2	Chase Clement	37	2007
3	Tommy Kramer	25	1976
	Chase Clement	25	2006
	Driphus Jackson	25	2014
6	Taylor McHargue	23	2012
7	Michael Calhoun	22	1981
	Taylor McHargue	22	2013
	JT Daniels	22	2023
10	Driphus Jackson	21	2015
	TJ McMahon	21	2022

Single game
Rank	Player	TDs	Year	Opponent
1	Chase Clement	8	2007	UTEP
2	Chase Clement	6	2008	SMU
	Chase Clement	6	2008	Southern Miss
	Chase Clement	6	2008	UTEP
	Chase Clement	6	2008	Houston
6	Donald Hollas	5	1990	Texas Tech
	Greg Henderson	5	2004	Hawai`i
	Chase Clement	5	2006	Army
	Chase Clement	5	2007	Memphis
	Charles Ross	5	2013	Louisiana Tech
	Tyler Stehling	5	2016	Prairie View A&M
	TJ McMahon	5	2022	McNeese
	Gael Ochoa	5	2026	Florida Atlantic

== Defense ==
=== Interceptions ===
Career
Rank	Player	Ints	Years
1	Bruce Henley	15	1971 1972 1973
2	Huey Keeney	13	1945 1946 1947 1948
	Dan Dawson	13	1998 1999 2000 2001
4	Nathan Bennett	11	1990 1991 1992 1993
	LaDouphyous McCalla	11	1994 1996 1997 1998
	Bryce Callahan	11	2011 2012 2013
7	Jason Hebert	10	1998 1999 2000 2001
	Gabriel Taylor	10	2020 2021 2022 2023 2024
9	Michael Downs	9	1977 1978 1979 1980
	Brian Patterson	9	1981 1982 1983
	Andrew Sendejo	9	2006 2007 2008 2009

Single-season
Rank	Player	Ints	Year
1	Bruce Henley	7	1972
	Dan Dawson	7	2000
3	Rex Proctor	6	1950
	Bruce Henley	6	1971
	Larry Brune	6	1975
	David Griffin	6	1989
	Nathan Bennett	6	1993
	Bryce Callahan	6	2011
9	various	5	

Single game
Rank	Player	Ints	Year	Opponent
1	Don Anderson	3	1947	Texas A&M
	Gerald Weatherly	3	1949	Clemson
	Carl Johnson	3	1952	TCU
	Dicky Maegle	3	1953	Baylor
	Pinky Nesbit	3	1953	Texas A&M
	Bucky Allshouse	3	1970	TCU
	Michael Downs	3	1978	TCU
	William McClay	3	1987	Texas State
	Dan Dawson	3	2000	Hawai'i
10	various	2		

=== Tackles ===
Career
Rank	Player	Tackles	Years
1	O.J. Brigance	367	1987 1988 1989 1990
2	Dan Dawson	318	1998 1999 2000 2001
3	Andrew Sendejo	318	2006 2007 2008 2009
4	Danny Burgess	310	1983 1984 1985 1986
5	Richard Gray	306	1980 1981 1982
6	Larry Izzo	301	1992 1993 1994 1995
7	Jason Hebert	300	1998 1999 2000 2001
8	Paul Porras	295	2010 2011 2012 2013
9	Joe Davis	293	1992 1993 1994 1995
10	Travis Ortega	286	1997 1998 1999 2000
	Travis Bradshaw	286	2008 2009 2010 2011

Single-season
Rank	Player	Tackles	Year
1	Robert Williamson	196	1980
2	Wayne Harpold	136	1982
3	Randy Piel	131	1974
4	O.J. Brigance	128	1988
5	Rodney Norton	127	1974
	Richard Gray	127	1982
	Tony Barker	127	1991
8	Larry Izzo	121	1995
9	Travis Bradshaw	121	2009
10	Brian Raines	118	2006

=== Sacks ===
Career
Rank	Player	Sacks	Years
1	Brandon Green	24.0	1999 2000 2001 2002
	Scott Solomon	24.0	2007 2008 2009 2011
3	N.D. Kalu	20.0	1993 1994 1995 1996
4	Josh Pearcy	16.5	2020 2021 2022 2023 2024
5	John Syptak	16.0	2002 2003 2004 2005
6	Matt Sign	14.0	1989 1990 1991 1992
	Courtney Gordon	14.0	2003 2004 2005 2006

Single-season
Rank	Player	Sacks	Year
1	Brandon Green	12.0	2001
2	Zack Patt	9.5	2014
3	Scott Solomon	9.0	2011
4	N.D. Kalu	8.0	1994
	John Syptak	8.0	2004
	Coutrney Gordon	8.0	2006
7	Tim Fitzpatrick	7.0	1989
	Alonzo Williams	7.0	1991
	Ndukwe Kalu	7.0	1995
	Brandon Green	7.0	2002
	Scott Solomon	7.0	2009
	Brian Nordstrom	7.0	2014

== Kicking ==
=== Field goals made ===
Career
Rank	Player	FGs	Years
1	Chris Boswell	65	2010 2011 2012 2013
2	James Hamrick	33	1983 1984 1985
3	Mark Williams	30	1970 1971 1972
4	Clark Fangmeier	28	2006 2007 2008 2009
5	Derek Crabtree	27	1998 1999 2000 2001
6	Clint Parsons	24	1987 1988 1989 1990
7	Brennan Landry	22	2002 2003 2004 2005
8	Alan Pringle	19	1973 1974
9	Christian VanSickle	16	2021 2022
10	Tim Horn	15	2022 2023 2024
	Enock Gota	15	2023 2024 2025

Single season
Rank	Player	FGs	Year
1	Chris Boswell	23	2012
2	James Hamrick	17	1985
	Chris Boswell	17	2011
4	Mark Williams	15	1972
5	Chris Boswell	14	2013
6	Mark Williams	13	1971
	Clint Parsons	13	1990
8	Alan Pringle	12	1973
	Matt Huelsman	12	1994
	Christian VanSickle	12	2022

Single game
Rank	Player	FGs	Year	Opponent
1	Chris Boswell	5	2012	SMU
2	Joel Baxter	4	1981	TCU
	Matt Huelsman	4	1994	TCU
	Chris Boswell	4	2012	Kansas

=== Field goal percentage ===
Career
Rank	Player	FG%	Years
1	Derek Crabtree	81.8%	1998 1999 2000 2001
2	Chris Boswell	73.9%	2010 2011 2012 2013
3	Enock Gota	71.4%	2023 2024 2025
4	Alan Pringle	70.4%	1973 1974
5	James Hamrick	70.2%	1983 1984 1985
6	Christian VanSickle	69.6%	2021 2022
7	Clint Parsons	66.7%	1987 1988 1989 1990
8	Darrell Richardson	63.6%	1991 1992

Single season
Rank	Player	FG%	Year
1	Derek Crabtree	88.9%	1999
2	Clint Parsons	86.7%	1990
3	Chris Boswell	81.0%	2011
4	Alan Pringle	80.0%	1973
	Alvaro Arenas	80.0%	1975
	Chris Barnes	80.0%	2019
7	Chris Boswell	79.3%	2012
8	James Hamrick	77.3%	1985
9	Enock Gota	76.9%	2025
10	Joel Baxter	75.0%	1981
	Collin Riccitelli	75.0%	2020
	Christian VanSickle	75.0%	2022
