= 2000 SMU Mustangs football team =

American college football season

2000 SMU Mustangs football
- Conference: Western Athletic Conference
- Record: 3–9 (2–6 WAC)
- Head coach: Mike Cavan (4th season)
- Offensive coordinator: Larry Kueck (2nd season)
- Offensive scheme: Spread option
- Defensive coordinator: Eric Schumann (4th season)
- Base defense: 4–3
- Home stadium: Gerald J. Ford Stadium

2000 Western Athletic Conference football standings
	Conf.			Overall
Team	W		L	W		L
No. 21 TCU +	7	–	1	10	–	2
UTEP +	7	–	1	8	–	4
Fresno State	6	–	2	7	–	5
San Jose State	5	–	3	7	–	5
Tulsa	4	–	4	5	–	7
Rice	2	–	6	3	–	8
Hawaii	2	–	6	3	–	9
SMU	2	–	6	3	–	9
Nevada	1	–	7	2	–	10
+ – Conference co-champions; Rankings from AP Poll

The 2000 SMU Mustangs football team represented Southern Methodist University (SMU) as a member the Western Athletic Conference (WAC) during the 2000 NCAA Division I-A football season. Led by fourth-year head coach Mike Cavan, the Mustangs compiled an overall record of 3–9 with a mark of 2–6 in conference play, tying for sixth place in the WAC. This was their first season at the newly opened Gerald J. Ford Stadium.

== Schedule ==
Date	Time	Opponent	Site	TV	Result	Attendance
September 2	6:00 p.m.	Kansas*	Gerald J. Ford Stadium; University Park, TX		W 31–17	32,267
September 9	8:05 p.m.	at UTEP	Sun Bowl; El Paso, TX	KSTR	L 20–37	31,483
September 16	6:00 p.m.	at NC State*	Carter–Finley Stadium; Raleigh, NC		L 0–41	50,034
September 23	6:00 p.m.	Tulane*	Gerald J. Ford Stadium; University Park, TX		L 17–29	26,375
September 30	7:00 p.m.	at Houston*	Robertson Stadium; Houston, TX (rivalry)		L 15–17	17,496
October 7	6:00 p.m.	San Jose State	Gerald J. Ford Stadium; University Park, TX		L 10–35	16,821
October 14	11:05 p.m.	at Hawaii	Aloha Stadium; Honolulu, HI	KSTR	L 15–30	36,635
October 28	11:00 a.m.	Nevada^{†}	Gerald J. Ford Stadium; University Park, TX		W 21–7	14,747
November 4	2:00 p.m.	at Rice	Rice Stadium; Houston, TX (rivalry)		L 14–43	11,418
November 11	6:00 p.m.	Tulsa	Gerald J. Ford Stadium; University Park, TX	KSTR	W 24–20	14,127
November 18	6:00 p.m.	at Fresno State	Bulldog Stadium; Fresno, CA	KSTR	L 7–14	40,184
November 24	7:30 p.m.	No. 13 TCU	Gerald J. Ford Stadium; University Park, TX (rivalry)		L 7–62	26,551
*Non-conference game; ^{†}Homecoming; Rankings from AP Poll released prior to the game; All times are in Central time

== Roster ==
2000 SMU Mustangs football team roster
Players
Coaches
Offense

Pos.	#	Name	Class
RB	24	Kris Briggs	So
WR	21	Chris Cunningham	So
WR	17	Billy Ford	So
WR	5	Johnnie Freeman	So
TE	86	John Hampton	So
OT	75	Sterling Harris	Fr
WR	82	Jim Kreimborg	Jr
OT	77	Aaron Ladd	Sr
QB	7	Kelan Luker	So
G	74	James McCarthy	Jr
QB	15	Josh McCown	Jr
C	52	Rich Nichols	Sr
TE	84	Steve O’Neill	Sr
OT	67	Joey Slaten	Jr

Defense

Pos.	#	Name	Class
DE	11	Kevin Aldridge	Jr
DT	92	Lute Croy	So
CB	1	Kevin Garrett	So
LB	35	D. D. Lee	Fr
S	22	Shane O'Neill	So
CB	39	James Orr	So
DT	95	Chris Post	Jr
LB	53	Corey Riley	Jr
LB	57	James Robinson	Jr
LB	42	Billy Jack Williams	So

Special teams

Pos.	#	Name	Class
K	16	Adam Walterscheid	Jr

Head coach

- Mike Cavan

Coordinators/assistant coaches

Legend

- (C) Team captain
- (S) Suspended
- (I) Ineligible
- Injured
- Redshirt

Roster
Last update: 2000-08-17
