= 2003 San Jose State Spartans football team =

American college football season

2003 San Jose State Spartans football
- Conference: Western Athletic Conference
- Record: 3–8 (2–6 WAC)
- Head coach: Fitz Hill (3rd season)
- Offensive coordinator: Charlie Roche (1st season)
- Co-offensive coordinator: Barry Lunney Jr. (1st season)
- Defensive coordinator: Chris Wilkerson (1st season)
- Home stadium: Spartan Stadium

2003 Western Athletic Conference football standings
	Conf.			Overall
Team	W		L	W		L
No. 16 Boise State $	8	–	0	13	–	1
Fresno State	6	–	2	9	–	5
Tulsa	6	–	2	8	–	5
Hawaii	5	–	3	9	–	5
Rice	5	–	3	5	–	7
Nevada	4	–	4	6	–	6
Louisiana Tech	3	–	5	5	–	7
San Jose State	2	–	6	3	–	8
UTEP	1	–	7	2	–	10
SMU	0	–	8	0	–	12
$ – Conference champion; Rankings from AP Poll

The 2003 San Jose State Spartans football team represented San Jose State University in the 2003 NCAA Division I-A football season. The team played their home games at Spartan Stadium in San Jose, California. They participated as members of the Western Athletic Conference. They were coached by head coach Fitz Hill.

== Schedule ==
Date	Time	Opponent	Site	TV	Result	Attendance
August 23	3:00 pm	Grambling State*	Spartan Stadium; San Jose, CA (Literacy Classic)	ESPN2	W 29–0	31,681
August 30	3:00 pm	at Florida*	Ben Hill Griffin Stadium; Gainesville, FL	PPV	L 3–65	90,011
September 6	7:00 pm	at Stanford*	Stanford Stadium; Stanford, CA (rivalry)		L 10–31	34,345
September 18	7:00 pm	Nevada	Spartan Stadium; San Jose, CA	FSNBA	L 20–42	10,173
October 4	5:00 pm	at Rice	Rice Stadium; Houston, TX		L 24–28	15,153
October 11	7:00 pm	SMU^{†}	Spartan Stadium; San Jose, CA	KICU	W 31–14	12,403
October 25	12:05 pm	at Boise State	Bronco Stadium; Boise, ID		L 14–77	26,062
November 1	12:00 pm	Hawaii	Spartan Stadium; San Jose, CA (Dick Tomey Legacy Game)	FSNBA, KFVE	L 10–13	13,523
November 8	2:05 pm	at UTEP	Sun Bowl; El Paso, TX	KICU	W 69–41	18,095
November 15	4:00 pm	at Fresno State	Bulldog Stadium; Fresno, CA (rivalry)		L 7–41	39,453
November 22	12:00 pm	Tulsa	Spartan Stadium; San Jose, CA		L 32–34	7,618
*Non-conference game; ^{†}Homecoming; All times are in Pacific time

== Game summaries ==
=== Grambling State ===
	1	2	3	4	Total
Tigers	0	0	0	0	0
Spartans	7	3	3	16	29

=== At Florida ===
	1	2	3	4	Total
Spartans	3	0	0	0	3
Gators	3	27	14	21	65

=== At Stanford ===
	1	2	3	4	Total
Spartans	10	0	0	0	10
Cardinal	0	21	3	7	31

=== Nevada ===
	1	2	3	4	Total
Wolf Pack	13	13	9	7	42
Spartans	0	10	14	6	30

=== At Rice ===
	1	2	3	4	Total
Spartans	14	3	0	7	24
Owls	7	7	0	14	28

=== SMU ===
	1	2	3	4	Total
Mustangs	0	0	14	0	14
Spartans	7	17	0	7	31

=== At Boise State ===
	1	2	3	4	Total
Spartans	0	7	7	0	14
Broncos	17	30	23	7	77

=== Hawaii ===
	1	2	3	4	Total
Warriors	0	6	7	0	13
Spartans	10	0	0	0	10

=== At UTEP ===
	1	2	3	4	Total
Spartans	13	35	7	14	69
Miners	10	10	0	21	41

=== At Fresno State ===
	1	2	3	4	Total
Spartans	0	0	0	7	7
Bulldogs	3	21	7	10	41

=== Tulsa ===
	1	2	3	4	Total
Golden Hurricane	7	7	7	13	34
Spartans	6	20	0	6	32

== Coaching staff ==
Name	Position	Seasons at San Jose State
Fitz Hill	Head coach	3rd
Earl Buckingham	Assistant head coach / defensive line	3rd
Charlie Roche	Offensive coordinator / offensive line	3rd
Chris Wilkerson	Defensive coordinator / safeties	2nd
Keith Allen	Special teams coordinator / defensive ends	2nd
Barry Lunney Jr.	Quarterbacks coach	1st
Charles Nash	Running backs coach	3rd
Keith Williams	Wide receivers coach	3rd
Kenwick Thompson	Linebackers coach / recruiting coordinator	3rd
Edmund Jones	Cornerbacks coach	1st
Kyle O'Quinn	Assistant director of athletics – Football operations	3rd
