= Pat Henderson =

Pat Henderson may refer to:

- Pat Henderson (American football), American football administrator and coach
- Pat Henderson (hurler) (born 1943), Irish hurling manager and player

== See also ==
- Patrick Henderson, American gospel musician
