= 1999 UTEP Miners football team =

American college football season

1999 UTEP Miners football
- Conference: Western Athletic Conference
- Record: 5–7 (3–4 WAC)
- Head coach: Charlie Bailey (7th season)
- Offensive coordinator: Gary Nord (3rd season)
- Defensive coordinator: Ronnie Jones (4th season)
- Home stadium: Sun Bowl

1999 Western Athletic Conference football standings
	Conf.			Overall
Team	W		L	W		L
Hawaii +	5	–	2	9	–	4
TCU +	5	–	2	8	–	4
Fresno State +	5	–	2	8	–	5
Rice	4	–	3	5	–	6
SMU	3	–	3	4	–	6
UTEP	3	–	4	5	–	7
San Jose State	1	–	5	3	–	7
Tulsa	1	–	6	2	–	9
+ – Conference co-champions

The 1999 UTEP Miners football team was an American football team that represented the University of Texas at El Paso in the Western Athletic Conference during the 1999 NCAA Division I-A football season. In their seventh year under head coach Charlie Bailey, the team compiled a 5–7 record.

== Schedule ==
Date	Opponent	Site	TV	Result	Attendance
September 4	New Mexico*	Sun Bowl; El Paso, TX		W 13–10	41,136
September 11	at Oregon*	Autzen Stadium; Eugene, OR	OSN	L 28–47	40,938
September 18	at No. 16 Kansas State*	KSU Stadium; Manhattan, KS		L 7–40	50,923
September 25	New Mexico State*	Sun Bowl; El Paso, TX (rivalry)		W 54–23	52,247
October 2	at Hawaii	Aloha Stadium; Halawa, HI		L 3–33	39,021
October 9	SMU^{†}	Sun Bowl; El Paso, TX		W 42–28	38,257
October 16	at Arizona*	Arizona Stadium; Tucson, AZ	FSAZ	L 21–34	47,776
October 23	at Fresno State	Bulldog Stadium; Fresno, CA		L 23–24	36,405
October 30	San Jose State	Sun Bowl; El Paso, TX		W 42–26	25,107
November 6	Tulsa	Sun Bowl; El Paso, TX		L 19–43	25,527
November 13	at Rice	Rice Stadium; Houston, TX		W 30–29	18,235
November 20	at TCU	Amon G. Carter Stadium; Fort Worth, TX		L 24–52	21,218
*Non-conference game; ^{†}Homecoming; Rankings from AP Poll released prior to the game
