= 2002 San Jose State Spartans football team =

American college football season

2002 San Jose State Spartans football
- Conference: Western Athletic Conference
- Record: 6–7 (4–4 WAC)
- Head coach: Fitz Hill (2nd season)
- Offensive coordinator: Norman Joseph (2nd season)
- Defensive coordinator: Ronnie Lee (2nd season)
- Home stadium: Spartan Stadium

2002 Western Athletic Conference football standings
	Conf.			Overall
Team	W		L	W		L
No. 15 Boise State $	8	–	0	12	–	1
Hawaii	7	–	1	10	–	4
Fresno State	6	–	2	9	–	5
San Jose State	4	–	4	6	–	7
Nevada	4	–	4	5	–	7
Rice	3	–	5	4	–	7
Louisiana Tech	3	–	5	4	–	8
SMU	3	–	5	3	–	9
UTEP	1	–	7	2	–	10
Tulsa	1	–	7	1	–	11
$ – Conference champion; Rankings from AP Poll

The 2002 San Jose State Spartans football team represented San Jose State University in the 2002 NCAA Division I-A football season. Members of the Western Athletic Conference (WAC), the Spartans were led by second-year head coach Fitz Hill and played their home games at Spartan Stadium. The Spartans finished the season 6–7, 4–4 in WAC play, to finish in fourth place. Although they improved from a 3–9 season in 2001, the Spartans did not participate in a bowl game.

== Schedule ==
Date	Time	Opponent	Site	TV	Result	Attendance
August 31	4:00 p.m.	vs. Arkansas State*	War Memorial Stadium; Little Rock, AR		W 33-14	18,492
September 7	12:30 p.m.	at No. 11 Washington*	Husky Stadium; Seattle, WA	FSNNW	L 10–34	70,147
September 14	7:00 p.m.	at Stanford*	Stanford Stadium; Stanford, CA (rivalry)	KRON	L 26–63	54,500
September 21	11:00 a.m.	at Illinois*	Memorial Stadium; Champaign, IL		W 38–35	50,990
September 28	7:00 p.m.	UTEP	Spartan Stadium; San Jose, CA	FSNBA, FSNSW	W 58–24	10,416
October 5	12:00 p.m.	at SMU	Gerald J. Ford Stadium; Dallas, TX		W 34–23	13,016
October 12	9:00 a.m.	at No. 5 Ohio State*	Ohio Stadium; Columbus, OH	ESPN Plus	L 7–50	104,892
October 19	1:00 p.m.	at Nevada	Mackay Stadium; Reno, NV		L 24–52	19,481
October 26	2:00 p.m.	Boise State^{†}	Spartan Stadium; San Jose, CA		L 8–45	10,497
November 2	8:00 p.m.	at Hawaii	Aloha Stadium; Halawa, HI (Dick Tomey Legacy Game)	Oceanic PPV, KFVE	L 31–40	36,784
November 9	2:00 p.m.	Louisiana Tech	Spartan Stadium; San Jose, CA		W 42–30	6,391
November 16	12:00 p.m.	at Tulsa	Skelly Stadium; Tulsa, OK	Cox 9	W 49–38	15,653
November 23	2:00 p.m.	Fresno State	Spartan Stadium; San Jose, CA (rivalry)		L 16–19	14,134
*Non-conference game; ^{†}Homecoming; Rankings from AP Poll released prior to the game; All times are in Pacific time

== Game summaries ==
=== Vs. Arkansas State ===
	1	2	3	4	Total
Spartans					0
Indians					0

=== At No. 14 Washington ===
	1	2	3	4	Total
Spartans	0	10	0	0	10
No. 14 Huskies	0	0	17	17	34

=== At Stanford ===
	1	2	3	4	Total
Spartans	10	10	6	0	26
Cardinal	7	21	21	14	63

=== At Illinois ===
	1	2	3	4	Total
Spartans	7	14	7	10	38
Fighting Illini	0	21	0	14	35

=== UTEP ===
	1	2	3	4	Total
Miners	7	3	14	0	24
Spartans	7	21	10	20	58

=== At SMU ===
	1	2	3	4	Total
Spartans	7	0	14	13	34
Mustangs	14	6	3	0	23

=== At No. 5 Ohio State ===
	1	2	3	4	Total
Spartans	0	7	0	0	7
No. 5 Buckeyes	7	17	17	9	50

=== At Nevada ===
	1	2	3	4	Total
Spartans	0	17	0	7	24
Wolf Pack	14	0	17	21	52

=== Boise State ===
	1	2	3	4	Total
Broncos	21	7	3	14	45
Spartans	0	0	0	8	8

=== At Hawaii ===
	1	2	3	4	Total
Spartans	10	7	0	14	31
Warriors	14	14	2	10	40

=== Louisiana Tech ===
	1	2	3	4	Total
Bulldogs	9	14	0	7	30
Spartans	0	14	7	21	42

=== At Tulsa ===
	1	2	3	4	Total
Spartans	14	28	7	0	49
Golden Hurricane	6	15	3	14	38

=== Fresno State ===
	1	2	3	4	Total
Bulldogs	0	10	3	6	19
Spartans	6	7	3	0	16

== Personnel ==
=== Coaching staff ===
Name	Position	Seasons at San Jose State	Alma mater
Fitz Hill	Head coach	2	Ouachita Baptist (1987)
Earl Buckingham	Assistant head coach, defensive line	2	Arkansas (1983)
Norman Joseph	Co-offensive coordinator, quarterbacks	2	Mississippi State (1977)
Ronnie Lee	Defensive coordinator, defensive backs	2	Washington State (1989)
Charlie Roche	Co-offensive coordinator, offensive line	2	Eastern Illinois (1996)
Charles Nash	Running backs	2	Arizona (1976)
Kenwick Thompson	Linebackers, recruiting coordinator	2	Harding (1992)
Keith Williams	Wide receivers	2	San Diego State (1996)
Chris Wilkerson	Defensive ends	1	Eastern Illinois (1995)
Keith Allen	Special teams, defensive assistant	1	Oklahoma (1997)

=== Final roster ===
2002 San Jose State Spartans final roster
Quarterbacks: 2: Marcus Arroyo – Senior; 16: Beau Pierce – Sophomore; 5: Scott Rislov – Junior; Running backs: --: Steven Bradley – TB – Freshman; 25: Clarence Cunningham – TB – Sophomore; 8: Lamar Ferguson – TB – Sophomore; 36: Demarcus Ingram – TB – Junior; 31: Lance Martin – TB – Sophomore; 45: Brandon Miles – FB – Senior; --: Ahmir Rahmar – TB – Junior; 26: Ezekiel Staples – Freshman; Wide receivers: 11: Jamall Broussard – Junior; 85: John Broussard – Freshman; 86: Chester Coleman – Freshman; 91: Terell Johnson – Freshman; 82: James Jones – Freshman; 96: Ronald Jones – Freshman; 89: Casey Miranda – Junior; 10: Charles Pauley – Senior; 80: Rufus Skillern – Freshman; 1: Kendrick Starling – Junior; 84: Malcolm Thompson – Freshman; 81: Juan Walden – Senior; 3: Tuati Wooden – Junior; Tight ends: 19: Courtney Anderson – Junior; 88: Marcus Helfman – Senior	Offensive linemen: 66: Justin Arrington – OG – Junior; 76: Matt Cantu – OG – Freshman; 64: Charley Dehoney – OG – Senior; 70: Joseph Hayes – OG – Junior; 78: Jeff Gordon – OT – Junior; 65: Kevin Israel – OG – Junior; 63: Eric Olson – OT – Freshman; 59: Tim Provost – OT – Senior; 73: Osmar Staples – OT – Junior; 71: John Toensfeldt – OT – Freshman; 77: LaMons Walker – C – Senior; Defensive linemen: 83: Ethan Allen – DE – Senior; 57: Jamaal Allen – DE – Freshman; 92: Mike Beams – DT – Senior; 90: Adonis Forrest – DT – Senior; 74: Aaron Gilbert – DT – Freshman; 69: Kinji Green – DT – Freshman; --: Daniel Grossi – DE – Freshman; 93: Jason Gustus – DT – Junior; 95: Justin James – DE – Freshman; 44: Chip Kimmich – DE – Senior; 40: Steve Nash – DE – Junior; 56: Philip Perry – DE – Junior; 54: Larnell Ransom – DE – Freshman; 98: Dan Schultz – DE – Freshman; 75: Joshua Smith – DT – Freshman	Linebackers: --: Chris Catoe – Freshman; 62: Ian Cossar – Freshman; 49: Tony Ficklin – Sophomore; 17: Brian Foreman – Senior; 51: Erik Garcia – Freshman; 52: Craig Grant - Freshman; 20: Luke La Herran – Senior; 29: Mike Liranzo – Senior; --: Cory Lynch – Junior; 94: Sean McNamara – Junior; 87: Kollie Moore – Senior; 35: Onyeka Ossai – Junior; 67: Justin Pigg – Junior; 55: Michael Smith – OLB – Junior; 46: Tyrell Tyler – Freshman; Defensive backs: 41: C.J. Arnold – S – Senior; 24: Kevin Boyer – CB – Junior; 14: Jamonte Cox – S – Freshman; 28: Shaun Fletcher – CB – Senior; 38: Gerald Jones – S – Junior; 23: Carlos Koustas – CB – Sophomore; 30: Skyler McKnight – S – Junior; --: Raul Menjivar – CB – Junior; 15: Brian Nunez – S – Freshman; 37: Brian Guthrie – S – Junior; 32: Neil Parry – S – Junior; 33: Josh Powell – S – Sophomore; 7: Zack Rance – S – Junior; 27: Donald Richardson – S – Freshman; 43: Terrance Tillman – CB – Junior; --: Stephen Trammell – S – Freshman; 4: I'lario Vital – CB – Freshman; 6: Mario Vital – S – Junior; 18: Quincy Washington – CB – Junior; 21: Eric Wilson – CB – Sophomore; Special teams: 39: Michael Carr – P – Senior; 13: Nick Gilliam – PK – Senior; --: Craig Nakano – PK – Freshman; 12: Dale Rogers – P – Junior
