= 1999 SMU Mustangs football team =

American college football season

1999 SMU Mustangs football
- Conference: Western Athletic Conference
- Record: 4–6 (3–3 WAC)
- Head coach: Mike Cavan (3rd season)
- Offensive coordinator: Greg Briner (2nd season)
- Co-offensive coordinator: Larry Kueck (1st season)
- Offensive scheme: Spread option
- Defensive coordinator: Eric Schumann (3rd season)
- Base defense: 4–3
- Home stadium: Cotton Bowl

1999 Western Athletic Conference football standings
	Conf.			Overall
Team	W		L	W		L
Hawaii +	5	–	2	9	–	4
TCU +	5	–	2	8	–	4
Fresno State +	5	–	2	8	–	5
Rice	4	–	3	5	–	6
SMU	3	–	3	4	–	6
UTEP	3	–	4	5	–	7
San Jose State	1	–	5	3	–	7
Tulsa	1	–	6	2	–	9
+ – Conference co-champions

The 1999 SMU Mustangs football team represented Southern Methodist University (SMU) as a member the Western Athletic Conference (WAC) during the 1999 NCAA Division I-A football season. Led by third-year head coach Mike Cavan, the Mustangs compiled an overall record of 4–6 with a mark of 3–3 in conference play, placing fifth in the WAC.

== Schedule ==
Date	Time	Opponent	Site	TV	Result	Attendance	Source
September 4	7:00 p.m.	Arkansas*	Cotton Bowl; Dallas, TX	PPV	L 0–26	51,019	
September 11	6:00 p.m.	at Tulane*	Louisiana Superdome; New Orleans, LA	KLDT	L 19–53	20,097	
September 25	2:00 p.m.	Hawaii	Cotton Bowl; Dallas, TX		L 0–20	15,131	
October 2	1:00 p.m.	at Kansas*	Memorial Stadium; Lawrence, KS		L 9–27	24,700	
October 9	8:05 p.m.	at UTEP	Sun Bowl Stadium; El Paso, TX	KLDT	L 28–42	38,257	
October 14	6:00 p.m.	Fresno State	Cotton Bowl; Dallas, TX	FSN	W 24–14	8,211	
October 30	2:00 p.m.	Rice^{†}	Cotton Bowl; Dallas, TX (rivalry)		W 27–2	16,272	
November 13	2:00 p.m.	Cal State Northridge*	Cotton Bowl; Dallas, TX		W 58–16	7,494	
November 20	2:00 p.m.	at Tulsa	Skelly Stadium; Tulsa, OK		W 28–14	14,199	
November 26	2:00 p.m.	at TCU	Amon G. Carter Stadium; Fort Worth, TX (rivalry)	FSN	L 0–21	25,725	
*Non-conference game; ^{†}Homecoming; All times are in Central time

== Roster ==
1999 SMU Mustangs football team roster
Players
Coaches
Offense

Pos.	#	Name	Class
QB	7	Kelan Luker	Fr
QB	14	Steve O’Neill	Jr
QB	15	Josh McCown	So
RB	24	Kris Briggs	Fr
RB	28	Rodnick Phillips	Sr
FB	46	Jeff Pennington	Sr
C	70	Austin Adami	Sr
OL	78	Bill Holder	Sr
WR	82	Rob Fowler	Jr
TE	86	John Hampton	Fr
WR	87	Damond Blueitt	Sr

Defense

Pos.	#	Name	Class
CB	1	Kevin Garrett	So
DE	11	Kevin Aldridge	So
S	22	Shane O'Neill	So
LB	42	Billy Jack Williams	Fr
DT	92	Lute Croy	Fr
DT	95	Chris Post	So

Special teams

Pos.	#	Name	Class
K	16	Adam Walterscheid	So

Head coach

- Mike Cavan

Coordinators/assistant coaches

Legend

- (C) Team captain
- (S) Suspended
- (I) Ineligible
- Injured
- Redshirt

Roster
Last update: 1999-08-31
