= 2003 Hawaii Warriors football team =

American college football season

2003 Hawaii Warriors football

Hawaii Bowl champion

Hawaii Bowl, W 54–48 vs. Houston
- Conference: Western Athletic Conference
- Record: 9–5 (5–3 WAC)
- Head coach: June Jones (5th season)
- Offensive scheme: Run and shoot
- Defensive coordinator: George Lumpkin (1st season)
- Base defense: 4–3
- Home stadium: Aloha Stadium

2003 Western Athletic Conference football standings
	Conf.			Overall
Team	W		L	W		L
No. 16 Boise State $	8	–	0	13	–	1
Fresno State	6	–	2	9	–	5
Tulsa	6	–	2	8	–	5
Hawaii	5	–	3	9	–	5
Rice	5	–	3	5	–	7
Nevada	4	–	4	6	–	6
Louisiana Tech	3	–	5	5	–	7
San Jose State	2	–	6	3	–	8
UTEP	1	–	7	2	–	10
SMU	0	–	8	0	–	12
$ – Conference champion; Rankings from AP Poll

The 2003 Hawaii Warriors football team represented the University of Hawaii at Manoa in the 2003 NCAA Division I-A football season. Hawaii finished the 2003 season with a 9–5 record, going 6–2 in Western Athletic Conference (WAC) play. The Warriors made their second straight appearance in the Hawaii Bowl, facing off against Houston. The Warriors capped off their second straight winning season, and the fourth in five seasons, under head coach June Jones with a bowl win.

== Schedule ==
Date	Time	Opponent	Site	TV	Result	Attendance	Source
August 30	6:00 pm	Appalachian State*	Aloha Stadium; Halawa, HI	KFVE	W 40–17	42,996	
September 13	10:00 am	at No. 4 USC*	Los Angeles Memorial Coliseum; Los Angeles, CA	FSN	L 32–61	73,654	
September 19	3:00 pm	at UNLV*	Sam Boyd Stadium; Whitney, NV	ESPN2	L 22–33	34,287	
September 27	6:00 pm	Rice	Aloha Stadium; Halawa, HI	KFVE	W 41–21	40,040	
October 4	1:00 pm	at Tulsa	Skelly Stadium; Tulsa, OK	SPW	L 16–27	17,342	
October 11	6:00 pm	Fresno State	Aloha Stadium; Halawa, HI (rivalry)	KFVE	W 55–28	41,153	
October 18	9:00 am	at Louisiana Tech	Joe Aillet Stadium; Ruston, LA	ESPN Plus	W 44–41	19,128	
October 25	6:00 pm	UTEP^{†}	Aloha Stadium; Halawa, HI	KFVE	W 31–15	40,136	
November 1	10:00 am	at San Jose State	Spartan Stadium; San Jose, CA (rivalry)	KFVE	W 13–10	13,523	
November 15	10:00 am	at Nevada	Mackay Stadium; Reno, NV	KFVE	L 14–24	15,268	
November 22	6:00 pm	Army*	Aloha Stadium; Halawa, HI	KFVE	W 59–28	41,668	
November 29	2:45 pm	Alabama*	Aloha Stadium; Halawa, HI	ESPN	W 37–29	43,477	
December 6	6:30 pm	No. 18 Boise State	Aloha Stadium; Halawa, HI	ESPN2	L 28–45	39,685	
December 25	3:00 pm	Houston*	Aloha Stadium; Halawa, HI (Hawaii Bowl)	ESPN	W 54–48 ^{OT}	29,005	
*Non-conference game; ^{†}Homecoming; Rankings from AP Poll released prior to the game

== Statistics ==
- QB Timmy Chang: 353/601 (58.7%) for 4,198 yards and 29 touchdowns vs. 20 interceptions. 43 carries for -60 yards and 1 touchdown.
- QB Jason Whieldon: 88/147 (59.9%) for 1,131 yards and 12 touchdowns vs. 6 interceptions. 33 carries for 129 yards and 1 touchdown.
- RB John West: 64 carries for 422 yards and 4 touchdowns. 15 catches for 116 yards and 1 touchdown.
- RB Michael Brewster: 54 carries for 405 yards and 2 touchdowns. 33 catches for 363 yards and 2 touchdowns.
- RB Michael Bass: 53 carries for 307 yards and 3 touchdowns. 14 catches for 137 yards and 0 touchdowns.
- RB West Keliikipi: 37 carries for 247 yards and 6 touchdowns. 20 catches for 154 yards and 1 touchdown.
- WR Chad Owens: 85 catches for 1,134 yards and 9 touchdowns.
- WR Britton Komine: 53 catches for 602 yards and 5 touchdowns.
- WR Jason Rivers: 48 catches for 594 yards and 5 touchdowns.
- WR Gerald Welch: 43 catches for 462 yards and 4 touchdowns.
- WR Se'e Poumele: 29 catches for 330 yards and 2 touchdowns.
- WR Clifton Herbert: 11 catches for 186 yards and 2 touchdowns.
