= Keith Burns (American football coach) =

American football player and coach (born 1960)

Current position
- Title: Head coach
- Team: Fort Worth Country Day School
- Record: 20–16

Biographical details
- Born: September 26, 1960 (age 65); Hurst, Texas, U.S.

Playing career
- 1980–1982: Arkansas
- Position: Defensive back

Coaching career (HC unless noted)
- 1984: Arkansas (GA)
- 1985–1988: Pacific (CA) (assistant)
- 1989–1992: Rice (assistant)
- 1993: USC (DB)
- 1994–1997: USC (DC)
- 1998–1999: Arkansas (DC)
- 2000–2002: Tulsa
- 2004–2009: San Jose State (DC)
- 2010: Kansas State (DB)
- 2011: Ole Miss (DB)
- 2012–2013: Oakland Raiders (asst. ST)
- 2014: Archbishop Mitty HS (CA) (AHC/DC)
- 2015–2017: Archbishop Mitty HS (CA)
- 2018–2019: UTEP (DB)
- 2021–present: Fort Worth Country Day School

Administrative career (AD unless noted)
- 2020: UTEP (DPP)

Head coaching record
- Overall: 7–28 (college); 38–33 (high school)

Melvin Keith Burns (born September 26, 1960) is an American football coach. He served as head football coach at the University of Tulsa from 2000 to 2002, compiling an overall college football record of seven wins and 28 losses. Burns has also been the defensive coordinator at Pacific, USC, University of Arkansas and San Jose State. While at Arkansas in 1998, Burns was a finalist for the Broyles Award, given annually to the nation's top college football assistant coach. He was also an assistant special teams coach for the Oakland Raiders of the National Football League (NFL). After serving as assistant head coach and defensive coordinator for Archbishop Mitty High School in San Jose, Burns was promoted to head coach effective for 2015. Currently Keith Burns is coaching high school football at Fort Worth Country Day School in Fort Worth, Texas.

== Head coaching record ==
=== College ===
Year	Team	Overall	Conference	Standing	Bowl/playoffs
Tulsa Golden Hurricane (Western Athletic Conference) (2000–2002)
2000	Tulsa	5–7	4–4	5th	
2001	Tulsa	1–10	0–8	10th	
2002	Tulsa	1–11	1–7	T–9th	
Tulsa:		7–28	5–19		
Total:		7–28			

=== High school ===
Year	Team	Overall	Conference	Standing	Bowl/playoffs
Archbishop Mitty Monarchs (West Catholic League) (2015–2017)
2015	Archbishop Mitty	6–5	3–4	6th	
2016	Archbishop Mitty	7–6	3–4	5th	
2017	Archbishop Mitty	5–6	2–5	T–5th	
Archbishop Mitty:		18–17	8–13		
Fort Worth Country Day Falcons (Southwest Prep 3A) (2021–present)
2021	Fort Worth Country Day	4–5	4–2	T–2nd	
2022	Fort Worth Country Day	4–5	3–3	4th	
2023	Fort Worth Country Day	5–4	3–3	4th	
2024	Fort Worth Country Day	7–2	4–2	T–2nd	
Fort Worth Country Day:		20–16	14–10		
Total:		38–33			
