= 1999 TCU Horned Frogs football team =

American college football season

1999 TCU Horned Frogs football

WAC co-champion Mobile Alabama Bowl champion

Mobile Alabama Bowl, W 28–14 vs. East Carolina
- Conference: Western Athletic Conference
- Record: 8–4 (5–2 WAC)
- Head coach: Dennis Franchione (2nd season)
- Co-offensive coordinators: Mike Schultz (2nd season); Dan Dodd (2nd season)
- Offensive scheme: Multiple
- Defensive coordinator: Gary Patterson (2nd season)
- Base defense: 4–2–5
- Home stadium: Amon G. Carter Stadium

1999 Western Athletic Conference football standings
| | Conf. | | | Overall |
| Team | W | | L | W | | L |
|---|---|---|---|---|---|---|
| Hawaii + | 5 | – | 2 | 9 | – | 4 |
| TCU + | 5 | – | 2 | 8 | – | 4 |
| Fresno State + | 5 | – | 2 | 8 | – | 5 |
| Rice | 4 | – | 3 | 5 | – | 6 |
| SMU | 3 | – | 3 | 4 | – | 6 |
| UTEP | 3 | – | 4 | 5 | – | 7 |
| San Jose State | 1 | – | 5 | 3 | – | 7 |
| Tulsa | 1 | – | 6 | 2 | – | 9 |
+ – Conference co-champions

The 1999 TCU Horned Frogs football team represented Texas Christian University (TCU) in the 1999 NCAA Division I-A football season. The Horned Frogs finished the season 8–4 overall and 5–2 in conference to share the Western Athletic Conference championship with Hawaii and Fresno State. The team was coached by Dennis Franchione. The offense scored 362 points while the defense allowed 213 points. The Frogs played their home games in Amon G. Carter Stadium, which is located on campus in Fort Worth, Texas.

== Schedule ==
| Date | Time | Opponent | Site | TV | Result | Attendance |
|---|---|---|---|---|---|---|
| September 5 | 6:30 p.m. | No. 15 Arizona* | Amon G. Carter Stadium; Fort Worth, TX | FSN | L 31–35 | 34,612 |
| September 11 | 11:00 .m. | at Northwestern* | Ryan Field; Evanston, IL | ESPN Plus | L 7–17 | 26,494 |
| September 25 | 6:00 p.m. | at Arkansas State* | Indian Stadium; Jonesboro, AR | | W 24–21 | 14,781 |
| October 2 | 9:00 p.m. | at Fresno State | Bulldog Stadium; Fresno, CA | | L 19–26 ^{OT} | 37,112 |
| October 9 | 2:00 p.m. | San Jose State | Amon G. Carter Stadium; Fort Worth, TX | | W 42–0 | 21,093 |
| October 16 | 6:00 p.m. | Tulsa | Amon G. Carter Stadium; Fort Worth, TX | | W 56–17 | 27,957 |
| October 23 | 2:00 p.m. | at Rice | Rice Stadium; Houston, TX | | L 21–42 | 28,535 |
| October 31 | 11:00 p.m. | at Hawaii | Aloha Stadium; Honolulu, HI | | W 34–14 | 33,357 |
| November 13 | 2:00 p.m. | North Texas* | Amon G. Carter Stadium; Fort Worth, TX | | W 27–3 | 27,133 |
| November 20 | 2:00 p.m. | UTEP | Amon G. Carter Stadium; Fort Worth, TX | | W 52–24 | 21,218 |
| November 26 | 2:00 p.m. | SMU | Amon G. Carter Stadium; Fort Worth, TX (rivalry) | FSN | W 21–0 | 25,725 |
| December 22 | 6:30 p.m. | No. 19 East Carolina* | Ladd–Peebles Stadium; Mobile, AL (Mobile Alabama Bowl) | ESPN2 | W 28–14 | 34,200 |
*Non-conference game; Rankings from Coaches Poll released prior to the game; All times are in Central time

== Roster ==
1999 TCU Horned Frogs football team roster
Players
Coaches
Offense

| Pos. | # | Name | Class |
|---|---|---|---|
| WR | 13 | Cedric James | Jr |
| FB | 38 | George Layne | Jr |
| QB | 1 | Casey Printers | Fr |
| TE | 19 | Matt Schobel | So |
| RB | 5 | LaDainian Tomlinson | Jr |

Defense

| Pos. | # | Name | Class |
|---|---|---|---|
| S | 18 | Curtis Fuller | Jr |
| DE | 14 | Aaron Schobel | Jr |
| DE | 21 | Bo Schobel | Fr |
| DT | 95 | Shawn Worthen | Jr |

Special teams

| Pos. | # | Name | Class |

Head coach

- Dennis Franchione

Coordinators/assistant coaches

- Keith Allen (RC)

Legend

- (C) Team captain
- (S) Suspended
- (I) Ineligible
- Injured
- Redshirt

Roster

== Team players drafted into the NFL ==
Not one member was picked in the 2000 NFL draft. LaDainian Tomlinson and Aaron Schobel were drafted in the 2001 NFL draft.
