= 2002 Tulsa Golden Hurricane football team =

American college football season

2002 Tulsa Golden Hurricane football
- Conference: Western Athletic Conference
- Record: 1–11 (1–7 WAC)
- Head coach: Keith Burns (3rd season)
- Offensive coordinator: Dan Lounsbury (1st season)
- Defensive coordinator: Keith Burns (1st season)
- Home stadium: Skelly Stadium

2002 Western Athletic Conference football standings
	Conf.			Overall
Team	W		L	W		L
No. 15 Boise State $	8	–	0	12	–	1
Hawaii	7	–	1	10	–	4
Fresno State	6	–	2	9	–	5
San Jose State	4	–	4	6	–	7
Nevada	4	–	4	5	–	7
Rice	3	–	5	4	–	7
Louisiana Tech	3	–	5	4	–	8
SMU	3	–	5	3	–	9
UTEP	1	–	7	2	–	10
Tulsa	1	–	7	1	–	11
$ – Conference champion; Rankings from AP Poll

The 2002 Tulsa Golden Hurricane football team represented the University of Tulsa as a member of the Western Athletic Conference (WAC) during the 2002 NCAA Division I-A football season. Led by Keith Burns in his third and final season as head coach, the Golden Hurricane compiled an overall record of 1–11 with a mark of 1–7 in conference play, tying for ninth place in the WAC. Tulsa played home games at Skelly Stadium in Tulsa, Oklahoma.

== Schedule ==
Date	Time	Opponent	Site	TV	Result	Attendance
August 30	7:00 pm	No. 1 Oklahoma*	Skelly Stadium; Tulsa OK	ESPN	L 0–37	40,385
September 7	6:00 pm	at Arkansas State*	Indian Stadium; Jonesboro, AR		L 19–21	15,363
September 14	1:00 pm	at Louisiana Tech	Joe Aillet Stadium; Ruston, LA	FSN	L 9–53	18,600
September 21	6:00 pm	at Baylor*	Floyd Casey Stadium; Waco, TX		L 25–37	30,337
September 28	6:00 pm	Kansas*	Skelly Stadium; Tulsa, OK		L 33–43	17,893
October 12	6:00 pm	Boise State	Skelly Stadium; Tulsa, OK		L 24–52	15,079
October 19	11:00 pm	at Hawaii	Aloha Stadium; Halawa, HI		L 14–37	34,098
October 26	2:00 pm	UTEP^{†}	Skelly Stadium; Tulsa, OK		W 20–0	12,317
November 2	2:00 pm	Rice	Skelly Stadium; Tulsa, OK		L 18–33	12,587
November 9	4:00 pm	at Fresno State	Bulldog Stadium; Fresno, CA		L 12–31	37,841
November 16	2:00 pm	San Jose State	Skelly Stadium; Tulsa, OK		L 38–49	15,653
November 23	2:00 pm	at SMU	Gerald J. Ford Stadium; University Park, TX		L 21–24	12,324
*Non-conference game; ^{†}Homecoming; Rankings from AP Poll released prior to the game; All times are in Central time

== Roster ==
2002 Tulsa Golden Hurricane football team roster
Players
Coaches
Offense

Pos.	#	Name	Class
WR	82	Romby Bryant	Jr
QB	15	James Kilian	So

Defense

Pos.	#	Name	Class

Special teams

Pos.	#	Name	Class
RB	9	Garrett Mills	Fr

Head coach

- Keith Burns

Coordinators/assistant coaches

Legend

- (C) Team captain
- (S) Suspended
- (I) Ineligible
- Injured
- Redshirt
