= 2000 Tulsa Golden Hurricane football team =

American college football season

2000 Tulsa Golden Hurricane football
- Conference: Western Athletic Conference
- Record: 5–7 (4–4 WAC)
- Head coach: Keith Burns (1st season)
- Offensive coordinator: Jim Gilstrap (1st season)
- Defensive coordinator: Jeff McInerney (1st season)
- Home stadium: Skelly Stadium

2000 Western Athletic Conference football standings
	Conf.			Overall
Team	W		L	W		L
No. 21 TCU +	7	–	1	10	–	2
UTEP +	7	–	1	8	–	4
Fresno State	6	–	2	7	–	5
San Jose State	5	–	3	7	–	5
Tulsa	4	–	4	5	–	7
Rice	2	–	6	3	–	8
Hawaii	2	–	6	3	–	9
SMU	2	–	6	3	–	9
Nevada	1	–	7	2	–	10
+ – Conference co-champions; Rankings from AP Poll

The 2000 Tulsa Golden Hurricane football team represented the University of Tulsa as a member of the Western Athletic Conference (WAC) during the 2000 NCAA Division I-A football season. Led by first-year head coach Keith Burns, the Golden Hurricane compiled an overall record of 5–7 with a mark of 4–4 in conference play, placing fifth in the WASC. Tulsa played home games at Skelly Stadium in Tulsa, Oklahoma.

== Schedule ==
Date	Time	Opponent	Site	TV	Result	Attendance	Source
September 2	5:00 pm	at North Carolina*	Kenan Memorial Stadium; Chapel Hill, NC		L 9–30	44,000	
September 9	6:00 pm	Oklahoma State*	Skelly Stadium; Tulsa, OK (rivalry)		L 26–36	40,385	
September 16	2:30 pm	at Rice	Rice Stadium; Houston, TX	FSN	W 23–16	10,868	
September 23	6:00 pm	Louisiana Tech	Skelly Stadium; Tulsa, OK		W 22–10	17,673	
September 30	11:00 pm	at Hawaii	Aloha Stadium; Halawa, HI		W 24–14	36,430	
October 7	6:00 pm	UTEP^{†}	Skelly Stadium; Tulsa, OK		L 7–40	18,689	
October 14	7:00 pm	at New Mexico State*	Aggie Memorial Stadium; Las Cruces, NM		L 28–42	15,822	
October 21	6:00 pm	No. 11 TCU	Skelly Stadium; Tulsa, OK		L 3–17	20,034	
October 28	9:00 pm	at Fresno State	Bulldog Stadium; Fresno, CA		L 12–34	41,088	
November 11	6:00 pm	at SMU	Gerald J. Ford Stadium; University Park, TX		L 20–23	14,127	
November 18	2:00 pm	San Jose State	Skelly Stadium; Tulsa, OK		W 28–17	13,023	
November 25	2:00 pm	Nevada	Skelly Stadium; Tulsa, OK		W 38–3	15,024	
*Non-conference game; ^{†}Homecoming; Rankings from AP Poll released prior to the game; All times are in Central time
