= 2003 Louisiana Tech Bulldogs football team =

American college football season

2003 Louisiana Tech Bulldogs football
- Conference: Western Athletic Conference
- Record: 5–7 (3–5 WAC)
- Head coach: Jack Bicknell Jr. (5th season)
- Offensive coordinator: Conroy Hines (4th season)
- Co-defensive coordinators: Rick Smith (2nd season); Randy Bates (2nd season)
- Captains: Aaron Capps; Maxie Causey; Antonio Crow; D. J. Curry; Chris Van Hoy; Luke McCown; Chris Norwood; John Nash Jonte Price Booker T. Washington
- Home stadium: Joe Aillet Stadium; Independence Stadium

2003 Western Athletic Conference football standings
	Conf.			Overall
Team	W		L	W		L
No. 16 Boise State $	8	–	0	13	–	1
Fresno State	6	–	2	9	–	5
Tulsa	6	–	2	8	–	5
Hawaii	5	–	3	9	–	5
Rice	5	–	3	5	–	7
Nevada	4	–	4	6	–	6
Louisiana Tech	3	–	5	5	–	7
San Jose State	2	–	6	3	–	8
UTEP	1	–	7	2	–	10
SMU	0	–	8	0	–	12
$ – Conference champion; Rankings from AP Poll

The 2003 Louisiana Tech Bulldogs football team represented Louisiana Tech University as a member of the Western Athletic Conference (WAC) during the 2003 NCAA Division I-A football season. Led by fifth-year head coach Jack Bicknell Jr., the Bulldogs played their home games at Joe Aillet Stadium in Ruston, Louisiana and Independence Stadium in Shreveport, Louisiana. Louisiana Tech finished the season with a record of 5–7 overall and a mark of 3–5 in conference play, placing seventh in the WAC.

== Schedule ==
Date	Time	Opponent	Site	TV	Result	Attendance
August 28	6:45 pm	No. 3 Miami (FL)*	Independence Stadium; Shreveport, LA	ESPN	L 9–48	43,279
September 6	7:00 pm	at Louisiana–Lafayette*	Cajun Field; Lafayette, LA (rivalry)		W 34–3	24,211
September 13	11:00 am	at Michigan State*	Spartan Stadium; East Lansing, MI	ESPN Plus	W 20–19	72,387
September 20	9:00 pm	at Fresno State	Bulldog Stadium; Fresno, CA	SPW	L 6–16	38,093
October 4	2:00 pm	Boise State	Joe Aillet Stadium; Ruston, LA	ESPNGP	L 37–43	17,859
October 11	8:05 pm	at UTEP	Sun Bowl Stadium; El Paso, TX		W 38–35	28,144
October 18	2:00 pm	Hawaii^{†}	Joe Aillet Stadium; Ruston, LA	ESPN Plus	L 41–44	19,128
October 25	3:05 pm	at Nevada	Mackay Stadium; Reno, NV		W 42–34	22,157
November 1	7:00 pm	at No. 7 LSU*	Tiger Stadium; Baton Rouge, LA	PPV	L 10–49	91,879
November 8	2:00 pm	SMU	Joe Aillet Stadium; Ruston, LA		W 41–6	14,872
November 15	2:00 pm	at Tulsa	Skelly Stadium; Tulsa, OK		L 18–48	28,862
November 29	2:00 pm	Rice	Joe Aillet Stadium; Ruston, LA		L 14–49	8,752
*Non-conference game; ^{†}Homecoming; Rankings from AP Poll released prior to the game; All times are in Central time
