= 1999 Fresno State Bulldogs football team =

American college football season

1999 Fresno State Bulldogs football
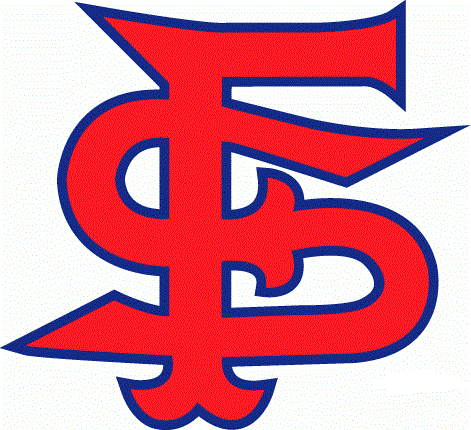

WAC co-champion

Las Vegas Bowl, L 16–17 vs. Utah
- Conference: Western Athletic Conference
- Record: 8–5 (5–2 WAC)
- Head coach: Pat Hill (3rd season)
- Offensive coordinator: Andy Ludwig (2nd season)
- Offensive scheme: Spread
- Defensive coordinator: Kevin Coyle (3rd season)
- Base defense: 4–3
- Home stadium: Bulldog Stadium

1999 Western Athletic Conference football standings
	Conf.			Overall
Team	W		L	W		L
Hawaii +	5	–	2	9	–	4
TCU +	5	–	2	8	–	4
Fresno State +	5	–	2	8	–	5
Rice	4	–	3	5	–	6
SMU	3	–	3	4	–	6
UTEP	3	–	4	5	–	7
San Jose State	1	–	5	3	–	7
Tulsa	1	–	6	2	–	9
+ – Conference co-champions

The 1999 Fresno State Bulldogs football team represented California State University, Fresno as a member of the Western Athletic Conference (WAC) during the 1999 NCAA Division I-A football season. Led by third-year head coach Pat Hill, the Bulldogs compiled an overall record of 8–5 with a mark of 5–2 in conference play, sharing the WAC title with Hawaii and 1999 TCU Horned Frogs football team. Fresno State was invited to the Las Vegas Bowl, where they lost to Utah. The Bulldogs played their home games at Bulldog Stadium in Fresno, California.

== Schedule ==
Date	Time	Opponent	Site	TV	Result	Attendance	Source
September 4	7:00 pm	Portland State*	Bulldog Stadium; Fresno, CA		W 34–6	34,977	
September 11	3:30 pm	at Oregon State*	Reser Stadium; Corvallis, OR		L 23–46	30,339	
September 18	7:00 pm	at No. 21 UCLA*	Rose Bowl; Pasadena, CA	FSNW2	L 21–35	42,649	
September 25	1:05 pm	at Nevada*	Mackay Stadium; Reno, NV		W 49–24	21,115	
October 2	7:00 pm	TCU	Bulldog Stadium; Fresno, CA		W 26–19 ^{OT}	37,112	
October 9	7:00 pm	Colorado State*	Bulldog Stadium; Fresno, CA		W 44–13	37,061	
October 14	4:00 pm	at SMU	Cotton Bowl; Dallas, TX	FSN	L 14–24	8,211	
October 23	2:00 pm	UTEP	Bulldog Stadium; Fresno, CA		W 24–23	36,405	
October 30	2:00 pm	at Tulsa	Skelly Stadium; Tulsa, OK	BSN	W 28–14	13,265	
November 6	2:00 pm	Rice	Bulldog Stadium; Fresno, CA		W 47–18	39,097	
November 13	8:00 pm	at Hawaii	Aloha Stadium; Honolulu, HI (rivalry)	BSN	L 24–31 ^{2OT}	37,283	
November 20	3:30 pm	San Jose State	Bulldog Stadium; Fresno, CA (rivalry)		W 63–12	38,732	
December 18	3:00 pm	vs. Utah*	Sam Boyd Stadium; Whitney, NV (Las Vegas Bowl)	ESPN2	L 16–17	28,227	
*Non-conference game; Rankings from AP Poll released prior to the game; All times are in Pacific time

== Roster ==
1999 Fresno State Bulldogs football team roster
Players
Coaches
Offense

Pos.	#	Name	Class
WR	5	Bernard Berrian	Fr
WR	6	Anthony Whitfield	Sr
QB	7	Billy Volek	Sr
QB	15	David Carr	So
OL	61	Ahmad Bhattl	Sr
OL	62	Rene Argelles	Fr
OL	63	Johnny Potasi	Jr
OL	64	Jessie Watson	So
OL	65	Chad Ede	Sr
OL	66	Dejon Kelly	Fr
OL	68	Rob Gatrell	Sr
OL	70	Justin Brown	Fr
OL	72	Rodney Michael	Fr
OL	74	Bryce Jackson	Sr
OL	75	Joe Schey	Fr
OL	76	Keith McKnight	Fr
OL	79	Mike Palncaud	Fr
TE	80	Billy Jack Pierce	So
TE	82	Michael Carter	Fr
WR	84	David Shabaglian	So
TE	85	Jeremy Johnson	So
TE	86	Vince Branstetter	Sr
WR	87	Keith Travis	Jr
TE	88	Donnell Burch	So
WR	89	Saleem Mahdi	Jr

Defense

Pos.	#	Name	Class
LB	49	Orlando Huff	Jr
LB	51	Tim Skipper	Jr
LB	55	Jaime Iracheta	Sr
LB	56	Allen Nicholas	Fr
DL	58	Seandale Jackson	Sr
DL	59	Jake Probst	So
DL	60	Karl Holley	Fr
DL	69	Ramsey Venner	So
DL	81	Kerry Hunter	Fr
DL	90	Nick Burley	Fr
DT	91	Jason Stewart	Fr
DL	92	Andy Ritenour	Fr
DL	93	Brock Torresdal	So
LB	95	Justin Johnson	Jr
DL	96	Frank Battle	Sr
DL	99	Thabiti Lockhart	Jr

Special teams

Pos.	#	Name	Class

Head coach

- Pat Hill

Coordinators/assistant coaches

Legend

- (C) Team captain
- (S) Suspended
- (I) Ineligible
- Injured
- Redshirt

Roster
