= 2003 Boise State Broncos football team =

American college football season

2003 Boise State Broncos football

WAC champion Fort Worth Bowl champion

Fort Worth Bowl, W 34–31 vs. TCU
- Conference: Western Athletic Conference

Ranking
- Coaches: No. 15
- AP: No. 16
- Record: 13–1 (8–0 WAC)
- Head coach: Dan Hawkins (3rd season)
- Offensive coordinator: Chris Petersen (3rd season)
- Defensive coordinator: Ron Collins
- Home stadium: Bronco Stadium

2003 Western Athletic Conference football standings
| | Conf. | | | Overall |
| Team | W | | L | W | | L |
|---|---|---|---|---|---|---|
| No. 16 Boise State $ | 8 | – | 0 | 13 | – | 1 |
| Fresno State | 6 | – | 2 | 9 | – | 5 |
| Tulsa | 6 | – | 2 | 8 | – | 5 |
| Hawaii | 5 | – | 3 | 9 | – | 5 |
| Rice | 5 | – | 3 | 5 | – | 7 |
| Nevada | 4 | – | 4 | 6 | – | 6 |
| Louisiana Tech | 3 | – | 5 | 5 | – | 7 |
| San Jose State | 2 | – | 6 | 3 | – | 8 |
| UTEP | 1 | – | 7 | 2 | – | 10 |
| SMU | 0 | – | 8 | 0 | – | 12 |
$ – Conference champion; Rankings from AP Poll

The 2003 Boise State Broncos football team represented Boise State University in the 2003 NCAA Division I-A football season. Boise State competed as a member of the Western Athletic Conference (WAC), and played their home games at Bronco Stadium in Boise, Idaho. The Broncos were led by third-year head coach Dan Hawkins. The Broncos finished the season 13–1 and 8–0 in conference to win their second consecutive WAC title and played in the Fort Worth Bowl, where they defeated TCU, 34–31.

== Schedule ==
| Date | Time | Opponent | Rank | Site | TV | Result | Attendance | Source |
|---|---|---|---|---|---|---|---|---|
| September 6 | 6:00 pm | No. 10 (I-AA) Idaho State* | | Bronco Stadium; Boise, ID (Battle for the Liberty Bell) | KBCI-TV | W 62–0 | 30,664 | |
| September 13 | 5:30 pm | at Idaho* | | Kibbie Dome; Moscow, ID (Brivalry) | KBCI-TV | W 24–10 | 14,320 | |
| September 20 | 5:00 pm | at Oregon State* | | Reser Stadium; Corvallis, OR | FSN | L 24–26 | 35,963 | |
| September 27 | 6:00 pm | Wyoming* | | Bronco Stadium; Boise, ID | KBCI-TV | W 33–17 | 30,192 | |
| October 4 | 1:00 pm | at Louisiana Tech | | Joe Aillet Stadium; Ruston, LA | KBCI-TV | W 43–37 | 17,859 | |
| October 11 | 6:00 pm | Tulsa^{†} | | Bronco Stadium; Boise, ID | SPW | W 27–20 | 29,719 | |
| October 18 | 1:00 pm | at SMU | | Gerald J. Ford Stadium; University Park, TX | KBCI-TV | W 45–3 | 10,109 | |
| October 25 | 1:05 pm | San Jose State | | Bronco Stadium; Boise, ID | | W 77–14 | 26,062 | |
| October 30 | 5:30 pm | at BYU* | | LaVell Edwards Stadium; Provo, UT | ESPN | W 50–12 | 60,554 | |
| November 15 | 1:05 pm | UTEP | No. 24 | Bronco Stadium; Boise, ID | | W 51–21 | 24,513 | |
| November 21 | 7:00 pm | at Fresno State | No. 20 | Bulldog Stadium; Fresno, CA (rivalry) | ESPN2 | W 31–17 | 39,252 | |
| November 29 | 1:05 pm | Nevada | No. 18 | Bronco Stadium; Boise, ID (rivalry) | SPW | W 56–3 | 27,440 | |
| December 6 | 9:30 pm | at Hawaii | No. 18 | Aloha Stadium; Halawa, HI | ESPN2 | W 45–28 | 39,685 | |
| December 23 | 6:30 pm | at No. 19 TCU* | No. 18 | Amon G. Carter Stadium; Fort Worth, TX (Fort Worth Bowl) | ESPN2 | W 34–31 | 38,028 | |
*Non-conference game; ^{†}Homecoming; Rankings from AP Poll released prior to the game; All times are in Mountain time
