= 2002 Hawaii Warriors football team =

American college football season

2002 Hawaii Warriors football

Hawaii Bowl, L 28–36 vs. Tulane
- Conference: Western Athletic Conference

Ranking
- Coaches: No. 24
- Record: 10–4 (7–1 WAC)
- Head coach: June Jones (4th season)
- Offensive scheme: Run and shoot
- Defensive coordinator: Kevin Lempa (3rd season)
- Base defense: 4–3
- Home stadium: Aloha Stadium

2002 Western Athletic Conference football standings
	Conf.			Overall
Team	W		L	W		L
No. 15 Boise State $	8	–	0	12	–	1
Hawaii	7	–	1	10	–	4
Fresno State	6	–	2	9	–	5
San Jose State	4	–	4	6	–	7
Nevada	4	–	4	5	–	7
Rice	3	–	5	4	–	7
Louisiana Tech	3	–	5	4	–	8
SMU	3	–	5	3	–	9
UTEP	1	–	7	2	–	10
Tulsa	1	–	7	1	–	11
$ – Conference champion; Rankings from AP Poll

The 2002 Hawaii Warriors football team represented the University of Hawaii at Manoa as a member of the Western Athletic Conference (WAC) during the 2002 NCAA Division I-A football season. Led by fourth-year head coach June Jones, the Warriors compiling an overall record of 10–4, finished second in the WAC with a mark of 7–1. They were invited to the Hawaii Bowl, where they lost to Tulane.

== Schedule ==
Date	Time	Opponent	Rank	Site	TV	Result	Attendance
August 31	6:00 pm	No. 4 (I-AA) Eastern Illinois*		Aloha Stadium; Honolulu, HI		W 61–36	39,958
September 6	1:00 pm	at BYU*		LaVell Edwards Stadium; Provo, UT	ESPN	L 32–35	63,085
September 21	3:00 pm	at UTEP		Sun Bowl Stadium; El Paso, TX		W 31–6	35,170
September 28	6:00 pm	SMU		Aloha Stadium; Honolulu, HI		W 42–10	36,096
October 5	2:00 pm	at Boise State		Bronco Stadium; Boise, ID		L 31–58	25,857
October 12	6:00 pm	Nevada^{†}		Aloha Stadium; Honolulu, HI	SPW	W 59–34	39,616
October 19	6:00 pm	Tulsa		Aloha Stadium; Honolulu, HI		W 37–14	34,098
October 25	3:00 pm	at Fresno State		Bulldog Stadium; Fresno, CA (rivalry)	ESPN2	W 31–21	37,615
November 2	6:00 pm	San Jose State		Aloha Stadium; Honolulu, HI (rivalry)		W 40–31	36,784
November 16	10:00 am	at Rice		Rice Stadium; Houston, TX		W 33–28	19,714
November 23	6:00 pm	Cincinnati*	No. 25	Aloha Stadium; Honolulu, HI		W 20–19	36,851
November 30	2:45 pm	No. 14 Alabama*	No. 24	Aloha Stadium; Honolulu, HI	ESPN	L 16–21	50,000
December 7	6:00 pm	San Diego State*		Aloha Stadium; Honolulu, HI		W 41–40	36,671
December 25	3:00 pm	Tulane*		Aloha Stadium; Honolulu, HI (Hawaii Bowl)	ESPN	L 28–36	35,513
*Non-conference game; ^{†}Homecoming; Rankings from Coaches' Poll released prior to the game; All times are in Hawaii time

== Team players in the NFL ==
Player	Position	Round	Pick	Club
Pisa Tinoisamoa	Linebacker	2	43	St. Louis Rams
Vincent Manuwai	Guard	3	72	Jacksonville Jaguars
Wayne Hunter	Tackle	3	73	Seattle Seahawks
