= 2000 San Jose State Spartans football team =

American college football season

2000 San Jose State Spartans football
- Conference: Western Athletic Conference
- Record: 7–5 (5–3 WAC)
- Head coach: Dave Baldwin (4th season)
- Home stadium: Spartan Stadium

2000 Western Athletic Conference football standings
	Conf.			Overall
Team	W		L	W		L
No. 21 TCU +	7	–	1	10	–	2
UTEP +	7	–	1	8	–	4
Fresno State	6	–	2	7	–	5
San Jose State	5	–	3	7	–	5
Tulsa	4	–	4	5	–	7
Rice	2	–	6	3	–	8
Hawaii	2	–	6	3	–	9
SMU	2	–	6	3	–	9
Nevada	1	–	7	2	–	10
+ – Conference co-champions; Rankings from AP Poll

The 2000 San Jose State Spartans football team represented San Jose State University in the 2000 NCAA Division I-A football season. The team played their home games at Spartan Stadium in San Jose, California. They participated as members of the Western Athletic Conference, and were coached by head coach Dave Baldwin. The team saw them finish with their first winning season since 1992.

== Schedule ==
Date	Time	Opponent	Site	TV	Result	Attendance
September 2	9:30 am	at Nebraska*	Memorial Stadium; Lincoln, NE	Foxsports.com	L 13–49	77,728
September 9	7:00 pm	at Stanford*	Stanford Stadium; Stanford, CA (rivalry)		W 40–27	41,525
September 16	6:00 pm	Southern Utah*	Spartan Stadium; San Jose, CA		W 47–7	7,226
September 23	3:30 pm	at USC*	Los Angeles Memorial Coliseum; Los Angeles, CA	BayTV, FSNW	L 24–34	56,545
September 30	12:30 pm	Rice	Spartan Stadium; San Jose, CA	FSN	W 29–16	6,743
October 7	4:00 pm	at SMU	Gerald J. Ford Stadium; University Park, TX		W 35–10	16,821
October 14	6:00 pm	UTEP^{†}	Spartan Stadium; San Jose, CA	ESPN Plus	L 30–47	13,274
October 21	1:00 pm	at Nevada	Mackay Stadium; Reno, NV		W 49–30	17,555
October 28	9:00 pm	at Hawaii	Aloha Stadium; Halawa, HI (rivalry)	BayTV	W 57–48	33,855
November 4	7:05 pm	No. 9 TCU	Spartan Stadium; San Jose, CA	ESPN2	W 27–24	15,681
November 18	12:00 pm	at Tulsa	Skelly Stadium; Tulsa, OK		L 17–28	13,023
November 25	12:30 pm	Fresno State	Spartan Stadium; San Jose, CA (rivalry)	KMPH	L 6–37	17,681
*Non-conference game; ^{†}Homecoming; Rankings from AP Poll released prior to the game; All times are in Pacific time

== Game summaries ==
=== At Nebraska ===
	1	2	3	4	Total
Spartans					0
Cornhuskers					0

=== At Stanford ===
	1	2	3	4	Total
Spartans					0
Cardinal					0

=== Southern Utah ===
	1	2	3	4	Total
Thunderbirds					0
Spartans					0

=== At USC ===
	1	2	3	4	Total
Spartans					0
Trojans					0

=== Rice ===
	1	2	3	4	Total
Owls					0
Spartans					0

=== At SMU ===
	1	2	3	4	Total
Spartans					0
Mustangs					0

=== UTEP ===
	1	2	3	4	Total
Miners					0
Spartans					0

=== At Nevada ===
	1	2	3	4	Total
Spartans					0
Wolf Pack					0

=== At Hawaii ===
	1	2	3	4	Total
Spartans					0
Warriors					0

=== No. 9 TCU ===
	1	2	3	4	Total
No. 9 Horned Frogs					0
Spartans					0

=== At Tulsa ===
	1	2	3	4	Total
Spartans					0
Golden Hurricane					0

=== Fresno State ===
	1	2	3	4	Total
Bulldogs					0
Spartans					0
