= 1999 Tulsa Golden Hurricane football team =

American college football season

1999 Tulsa Golden Hurricane football
- Conference: Western Athletic Conference
- Record: 2–9 (1–6 WAC)
- Head coach: David Rader (12th season; first 7 games); Pat Henderson (interim, final 4 games)
- Offensive coordinator: Rockey Felker (5th season)
- Defensive coordinator: Pat Henderson (3rd season)
- Home stadium: Skelly Stadium

1999 Western Athletic Conference football standings
	Conf.			Overall
Team	W		L	W		L
Hawaii +	5	–	2	9	–	4
TCU +	5	–	2	8	–	4
Fresno State +	5	–	2	8	–	5
Rice	4	–	3	5	–	6
SMU	3	–	3	4	–	6
UTEP	3	–	4	5	–	7
San Jose State	1	–	5	3	–	7
Tulsa	1	–	6	2	–	9
+ – Conference co-champions

The 1999 Tulsa Golden Hurricane football team represented the University of Tulsa during the 1999 NCAA Division I-A football season. In their 12th year under head coach David Rader, the Golden Hurricane compiled a 2–9 record, 1–6 against conference opponents, and finished in last place in the Western Athletic Conference. The team's statistical leaders included quarterback Josh Blankenship with 1,416 passing yards, John Mosley with 873 rushing yards, and Damon Savage with 752 receiving yards.

== Schedule ==
Date	Opponent	Site	Result	Attendance	Source
September 4	Southwest Missouri State*	Skelly Stadium; Tulsa, OK	W 45–21	25,007	
September 11	at Oklahoma State*	Lewis Field; Stillwater, OK (rivalry)	L 9–46	46,250	
September 18	at No. 7 Texas A&M	Kyle Field; College Station, TX	L 13–62	67,647	
September 25	at San Jose State	Spartan Stadium; San Jose, CA	L 10–34	12,871	
October 2	Rice	Skelly Stadium; Tulsa, OK	L 10–20	15,270	
October 16	at TCU	Amon G. Carter Stadium; Fort Worth, TX	L 17–56	27,957	
October 23	Hawaii^{†}	Skelly Stadium; Tulsa, OK	L 21–35	15,756	
October 30	Fresno State	Skelly Stadium; Tulsa, OK	L 14–28	13,265	
November 6	at UTEP	Sun Bowl; El Paso, TX	W 43–19	25,527	
November 13	Louisiana–Monroe*	Skelly Stadium; Tulsa, OK	L 34–37	15,037	
November 20	SMU	Skelly Stadium; Tulsa, OK	L 14–28	14,199	
*Non-conference game; ^{†}Homecoming; Rankings from AP Poll released prior to the game

== Roster ==
1999 Tulsa Golden Hurricane football team roster
Players
Coaches
Offense

Pos.	#	Name	Class
QB	16	Josh Blankenship	Fr
WR	86	Damon Savage	Sr
C	65	Steve Schiller	Jr
OL	72	Kevin Shaffer	So
WR	87	Donald Shoals	So

Defense

Pos.	#	Name	Class
DB	6	Gavin Engle	Jr
LB	46	Ashon Farley	Jr
DT	67	Phil Franks	Jr
DB	4	Todd Franz	Sr

Special teams

Pos.	#	Name	Class

Head coach

- David Rader

Coordinators/assistant coaches

Legend

- (C) Team captain
- (S) Suspended
- (I) Ineligible
- Injured
- Redshirt

Roster
Last update: 2000-09-02

== After the season ==
=== 2000 NFL draft ===
The following Golden Hurricane player was selected in the 2000 NFL draft following the season.

Round	Pick	Player	Position	NFL club
5	145	Todd Franz	Defensive back	Detroit Lions
