= 1999 San Jose State Spartans football team =

American college football season

1999 San Jose State Spartans football
- Conference: Western Athletic Conference
- Record: 3–7 (1–5 WAC)
- Head coach: Dave Baldwin (3rd season)
- Offensive coordinator: Steve Graf (1st season)
- Defensive coordinator: Todd Throckmorton (2nd season)
- Home stadium: Spartan Stadium

1999 Western Athletic Conference football standings
	Conf.			Overall
Team	W		L	W		L
Hawaii +	5	–	2	9	–	4
TCU +	5	–	2	8	–	4
Fresno State +	5	–	2	8	–	5
Rice	4	–	3	5	–	6
SMU	3	–	3	4	–	6
UTEP	3	–	4	5	–	7
San Jose State	1	–	5	3	–	7
Tulsa	1	–	6	2	–	9
+ – Conference co-champions

The 1999 San Jose State Spartans football team represented San Jose State University as a member of the Western Athletic Conference (WAC) during the 1999 NCAA Division I-A football season. Led by third-year head coach Dave Baldwin, the Spartans compiled an overall record of 3–7 with a mark of 1–5 in conference play, placing seventh in the WAC. San Jose State played home games at Spartan Stadium in San Jose, California

== Schedule ==
Date	Time	Opponent	Site	TV	Result	Attendance	Source
September 4	5:00 p.m.	at LSU*	Tiger Stadium; Baton Rouge, LA		L 29–21	76,753	
September 11	12:30 p.m.	at Colorado*	Folsom Field; Boulder, CO		L 63–35	41,716	
September 18	6:00 p.m.	Saint Mary's*	Spartan Stadium; San Jose, CA		W 38–3	12,235	
September 25	6:00 p.m.	Tulsa	Spartan Stadium; San Jose, CA		W 34–10	12,871	
October 2	2:00 p.m.	at Stanford*	Stanford Stadium; Stanford, CA (rivalry)		W 44–39	38,261	
October 9	12:00 p.m.	at TCU	Amon G. Carter Stadium; Fort Worth, TX		L 42–0	21,093	
October 16	9:00 a.m.	at Rice	Rice Stadium; Houston, TX	FSBA	L 49–7	10,213	
October 23	6:00 p.m.	SMU^{†}	Spartan Stadium; San Jose, CA		Cancelled		
October 30	5:00 p.m.	at UTEP	Sun Bowl; El Paso, TX		L 42–26	25,107	
November 6	12:30 p.m.	Hawaii	Spartan Stadium; San Jose, CA (rivalry)	KFVE	L 62–41	15,367	
November 20	3:30 p.m.	at Fresno State	Bulldog Stadium; Fresno, CA (rivalry)		L 63–12	38,732	
*Non-conference game; ^{†}Homecoming; All times are in Pacific time

== Game summaries ==
=== At LSU ===
	1	2	3	4	Total
Spartans	0	7	7	7	21
Tigers	7	10	6	6	29

=== At Colorado ===
	1	2	3	4	Total
Spartans	0	15	7	13	35
Buffaloes	28	14	7	14	63

=== Saint Mary's ===
	1	2	3	4	Total
Gaels					0
Spartans					0

=== Tulsa ===
	1	2	3	4	Total
Golden Hurricane					0
Spartans					0

=== At Stanford ===
	1	2	3	4	Total
Spartans	14	3	14	13	44
Cardinal	6	9	14	10	39

=== At TCU ===
	1	2	3	4	Total
Spartans	0	0	0	0	0
Horned Frogs	14	21	0	7	42

=== At Rice ===
	1	2	3	4	Total
Spartans					0
Owls					0

=== SMU (cancelled) ===
	1	2	3	4	Total
Mustangs					0
Spartans					0

=== At UTEP ===
	1	2	3	4	Total
Spartans					0
Miners					0

=== Hawaii ===
	1	2	3	4	Total
Warriors	9	20	6	27	62
Spartans	0	7	0	34	41

=== At Fresno State ===
	1	2	3	4	Total
Spartans					0
Bulldogs					0

== Coaching staff ==
Name	Position	Seasons at San Jose State	Alma mater
Dave Baldwin	Head coach	3	Cal State Northridge (1978)
Carl Dean	Wide receivers, recruiting coordinator	1	San Jose State (1997)
Tim Drevno	Offensive line	1	Cal State Fullerton (1992)
Wally Gaskins	Running backs	21	Montana (1973)
Steve Graf	Offensive coordinator	1	California Lutheran (1981)
Tom Quinn	Linebackers, tight ends, special teams coordinator	1	Arizona (1990)
Barry Sacks	Defensive line	2	Montana (1993)
Todd Throckmorton	Defensive coordinator, inside linebackers	3	Missouri Western (1987)
J.D. Williams	Cornerbacks	1	Fresno State (1997)
Jim Winkler	Safeties	1	San Diego State (1994)
