= Mike Cavan =

American football player and coach (born 1948)

Biographical details
- Born: April 15, 1948 (age 78)

Playing career
- 1968–1970: Georgia
- Position: Quarterback

Coaching career (HC unless noted)
- 1977–1985: Georgia (offensive backs)
- 1986–1991: Valdosta State
- 1992–1996: East Tennessee State
- 1997–2001: SMU

Head coaching record
- Overall: 89–83–2
- Tournaments: 1–1 (NCAA D-I-AA playoffs)

Accomplishments and honors

Awards
- Second-team All-SEC (1968); Florida–Georgia Hall of Fame

Mike Cavan (born April 15, 1948) is an American former college football player and coach. He served as the head football coach at Valdosta State University from 1986 to 1991, East Tennessee State University from 1992 to 1996, and Southern Methodist University (SMU) from 1997 to 2001, compiling a career head coaching record of 89–83–2. Cavan played as a quarterback at the University of Georgia from 1968 to 1970 and was an assistant coach there from 1977 to 1985. He joined the Georgia staff under Kirby Smart as special assistant to the head coach. He was part of the staff that has won two national championships under Smart.

== Head coaching record ==
Year	Team	Overall	Conference	Standing	Bowl/playoffs
Valdosta State Blazers (Gulf South Conference) (1986–1991)
1986	Valdosta State	9–2	7–1	2nd	
1987	Valdosta State	6–4	4–4	4th	
1988	Valdosta State	6–3–1	4–3–1	4th	
1989	Valdosta State	5–5	5–3	3rd	
1990	Valdosta State	5–5	5–3	4th	
1991	Valdosta State	6–3–1	4–1–1	T–2nd	
Valdosta State:		37–22–2	24–15–2		
East Tennessee State Buccaneers (Southern Conference) (1992–1996)
1992	East Tennessee State	5–6	2–5	6th	
1993	East Tennessee State	5–6	3–5	7th	
1994	East Tennessee State	6–5	4–4	T–5th	
1995	East Tennessee State	4–7	4–4	5th	
1996	East Tennessee State	10–3	7–1	2nd	L NCAA Division I-AA Quarterfinal
East Tennessee State:		30–27	20–19		
SMU Mustangs (Western Athletic Conference) (1997–2001)
1997	SMU	6–5	5–3	T–2nd (Mountain)	
1998	SMU	5–7	4–4	T–5th (Mountain)	
1999	SMU	4–6	3–3	5th	
2000	SMU	3–9	2–6	T–6th	
2001	SMU	4–7	4–3	5th	
SMU:		22–34	18–19		
Total:		89–83–2			
