= 2000 Hawaii Warriors football team =

American college football season

2000 Hawaii Warriors football
- Conference: Western Athletic Conference
- Record: 3–9 (2–6 WAC)
- Head coach: June Jones (2nd season)
- Offensive scheme: Run and shoot
- Defensive coordinator: Kevin Lempa (1st season)
- Base defense: 4–3
- Home stadium: Aloha Stadium

2000 Western Athletic Conference football standings
	Conf.			Overall
Team	W		L	W		L
No. 21 TCU +	7	–	1	10	–	2
UTEP +	7	–	1	8	–	4
Fresno State	6	–	2	7	–	5
San Jose State	5	–	3	7	–	5
Tulsa	4	–	4	5	–	7
Rice	2	–	6	3	–	8
Hawaii	2	–	6	3	–	9
SMU	2	–	6	3	–	9
Nevada	1	–	7	2	–	10
+ – Conference co-champions; Rankings from AP Poll

The 2000 Hawaii Warriors football team represented the University of Hawaii at Manoa as a member of the Western Athletic Conference (WAC) during the 2000 NCAA Division I-A football season. Led by second-year head coach June Jones, the Warriors compiled an overall record of 3–9 with a mark of 2–6 in conference play, placing in a three-way tie for sixth place in the WAC.

== Schedule ==
Date	Opponent	Site	Result	Attendance	Source
September 9	Portland State*	Aloha Stadium; Halawa, HI	L 20–45	50,000	
September 23	at UTEP	Sun Bowl; El Paso, TX	L 7–39	36,637	
September 30	Tulsa	Aloha Stadium; Halawa, HI	L 14–24	36,430	
October 7	at No. 14 TCU	Amon G. Carter Stadium; Fort Worth, TX	L 21–41	31,896	
October 14	SMU^{†}	Aloha Stadium; Halawa, HI	W 30–15	36,635	
October 21	at Rice	Rice Stadium; Houston, TX	L 13–38	22,521	
October 28	San Jose State	Aloha Stadium; Halawa, HI (rivalry)	L 48–57	33,855	
November 4	at Fresno State	Bulldog Stadium; Fresno, CA (rivalry)	L 27–45	42,160	
November 11	Nevada	Aloha Stadium; Halawa, HI	W 37–17	33,731	
November 18	Louisiana Tech*	Aloha Stadium; Halawa, HI	W 27–10	31,963	
November 25	Wisconsin*	Aloha Stadium; Halawa, HI	L 18–34	41,313	
December 2	UNLV*	Aloha Stadium; Halawa, HI	L 32–34	34,792	
*Non-conference game; ^{†}Homecoming; Rankings from AP Poll released prior to the game

== Game summaries ==
=== Portland State ===
	1	2	3	4	Total
Vikings	6	19	7	13	45
Warriors	10	0	3	7	20

=== At UTEP ===
	1	2	3	4	Total
Warriors	0	7	0	0	7
Miners	3	21	12	3	39

=== Tulsa ===
	1	2	3	4	Total
Golden Hurricane	7	10	0	7	24
Warriors	0	0	7	7	14

=== At No. 14 TCU ===
	1	2	3	4	Total
Warriors	14	0	0	7	21
No. 14 Horned Frogs	14	10	7	10	41

=== SMU ===
	1	2	3	4	Total
Mustangs	0	6	9	0	15
Warriors	14	3	0	13	30

=== At Rice ===
	1	2	3	4	Total
Warriors	3	0	10	0	13
Owls	7	21	0	10	38

=== San Jose State ===
	1	2	3	4	Total
Spartans	14	14	15	14	57
Warriors	6	0	21	21	48

=== At Fresno State ===
	1	2	3	4	Total
Warriors	14	0	0	13	27
Bulldogs	14	13	14	7	48

=== Nevada ===
	1	2	3	4	Total
Wolf Pack	0	10	0	7	17
Warriors	3	14	7	13	37

=== Louisiana Tech ===
	1	2	3	4	Total
Bulldogs	7	0	3	0	10
Warriors	14	0	6	7	27

=== Wisconsin ===
	1	2	3	4	Total
Badgers	7	13	7	7	34
Warriors	12	0	6	0	18

=== UNLV ===
	1	2	3	4	Total
Rebels	7	10	10	7	34
Warriors	7	10	3	12	32
