= 2000 UTEP Miners football team =

American college football season

2000 UTEP Miners football

WAC co-champion

Humanitarian Bowl, L 23–38 vs. Boise State
- Conference: Western Athletic Conference
- Record: 8–4 (7–1 WAC)
- Head coach: Gary Nord (1st season)
- Offensive coordinator: Patrick Higgins (1st season)
- Defensive coordinator: Larry Hoefer (1st season)
- Home stadium: Sun Bowl

2000 Western Athletic Conference football standings
	Conf.			Overall
Team	W		L	W		L
No. 21 TCU +	7	–	1	10	–	2
UTEP +	7	–	1	8	–	4
Fresno State	6	–	2	7	–	5
San Jose State	5	–	3	7	–	5
Tulsa	4	–	4	5	–	7
Rice	2	–	6	3	–	8
Hawaii	2	–	6	3	–	9
SMU	2	–	6	3	–	9
Nevada	1	–	7	2	–	10
+ – Conference co-champions; Rankings from AP Poll

The 2000 UTEP Miners football team represented the University of Texas at El Paso (UTEP) as a member of the Western Athletic Conference (WAC) during the 2000 NCAA Division I-A football season. Led by first-year head coach Gary Nord, the Miners compiled an overall record of 8–4 with a mark of 7–1 in conference play, sharing the WAC title with TCU. UTEP was invited to the Humanitarian Bowl, where the Miners lost to Boise State. The team played home games at the Sun Bowl in El Paso, Texas.

Brian Natkin became the first, and so far only, unanimous All-American in UTEP football history.

== Schedule ==
Date	Time	Opponent	Site	TV	Result	Attendance
September 2	6:30 pm	at No. 19 Oklahoma*	Oklahoma Memorial Stadium; Norman, Oklahoma	FSN	L 14–55	74,761
September 9	7:05 pm	SMU	Sun Bowl; El Paso, TX		W 37–20	31,483
September 16	7:00 pm	at Texas A&M*	Kyle Field; College Station, TX		L 17–45	69,184
September 23	7:05 pm	Hawaii	Sun Bowl; El Paso, TX		W 39–7	36,637
September 30	7:05 pm	New Mexico State*	Sun Bowl; El Paso, TX (Battle of I-10)		W 41–31	50,068
October 7	5:00 pm	at Tulsa	Skelly Stadium; Tulsa, OK	KKWB	W 40–7	18,689
October 14	7:00 pm	at San Jose State	Spartan Stadium; San Jose, CA	KKWB	W 47–30	13,274
October 21	7:05 pm	Fresno State^{†}	Sun Bowl; El Paso, TX		W 23–13	50,085
November 4	1:00 pm	at Nevada	Mackay Stadium; Reno, NV		W 45–22	15,249
November 11	7:05 pm	Rice	Sun Bowl; El Paso, TX		W 38–21	53,304
November 18	1:00 pm	at No. 15 TCU	Amon G. Carter Stadium; Fort Worth, TX	FSN	L 14–47	41,068
December 28	11:30 am	vs. Boise State*	Bronco Stadium; Boise, ID (Humanitarian Bowl)	ESPN2	L 23–38	26,203
*Non-conference game; ^{†}Homecoming; Rankings from AP Poll released prior to the game; All times are in Mountain time

== Roster ==
2000 UTEP Miners football team roster
Players
Coaches
Offense

Pos.	#	Name	Class
WR	7	Lee Mays	Jr
QB	13	Wes Phillips	Jr
TE	87	Brian Natkin	Sr
RB	32	Josh Wheat	Fr

Defense

Pos.	#	Name	Class

Special teams

Pos.	#	Name	Class
LS	47	Jon Dorenbos	So

Head coach

- Gary Nord

Coordinators/assistant coaches

Legend

- (C) Team captain
- (S) Suspended
- (I) Ineligible
- Injured
- Redshirt
