= 2003 SMU Mustangs football team =

American college football season

2003 SMU Mustangs football
- Conference: Western Athletic Conference
- Record: 0–12 (0–8 WAC)
- Head coach: Phil Bennett (2nd season)
- Offensive coordinator: Larry Edmondson (2nd season)
- Offensive scheme: Pro-style
- Defensive coordinator: Jim Gush (2nd season)
- Base defense: 4–3
- Home stadium: Gerald J. Ford Stadium

2003 Western Athletic Conference football standings
	Conf.			Overall
Team	W		L	W		L
No. 16 Boise State $	8	–	0	13	–	1
Fresno State	6	–	2	9	–	5
Tulsa	6	–	2	8	–	5
Hawaii	5	–	3	9	–	5
Rice	5	–	3	5	–	7
Nevada	4	–	4	6	–	6
Louisiana Tech	3	–	5	5	–	7
San Jose State	2	–	6	3	–	8
UTEP	1	–	7	2	–	10
SMU	0	–	8	0	–	12
$ – Conference champion; Rankings from AP Poll

The 2003 SMU Mustangs football team represented Southern Methodist University (SMU) as a member the Western Athletic Conference (WAC) during the 2003 NCAA Division I-A football season. Led by second-year head coach Phil Bennett, the Mustangs compiled an overall record of 0–12 with a mark of 0–8 in conference play, placing last out of ten teams in the WAC.

== Schedule ==
Date	Time	Opponent	Site	TV	Result	Attendance
August 30	6:00 p.m.	at Texas Tech*	Jones SBC Stadium; Lubbock, TX		L 10–58	44,364
September 13	6:00 p.m.	at Baylor*	Floyd Casey Stadium; Waco, TX		L 7–10	30,256
September 20	7:00 p.m.	Oklahoma State*	Gerald J. Ford Stadium; University Park, TX	FSN	L 6–52	27,106
September 27	9:00 p.m.	at Nevada	Mackay Stadium; Reno, NV		L 9–12	21,128
October 4	7:00 p.m.	UTEP	Gerald J. Ford Stadium; University Park, TX	ESPNGP	L 19–21	21,412
October 11	9:00 p.m.	at San Jose State	Spartan Stadium; San Jose	SPW	L 14–31	12,403
October 18	2:00 p.m.	Boise State	Gerald J. Ford Stadium; University Park, TX		L 3–45	10,109
October 25	2:00 p.m.	at Tulsa	Skelly Stadium; Tulsa, OK		L 16–35	16,733
November 1	2:00 p.m.	Fresno State^{†}	Gerald J. Ford Stadium; University Park, TX		L 11–20	14,014
November 8	2:00 p.m.	at Louisiana Tech	Joe Aillet Stadium; Ruston, LA		L 6–41	14,872
November 15	3:00 p.m.	Rice	Gerald J. Ford Stadium; University Park, TX (rivalry)	SPW	L 20–41	11,856
November 29	2:00 p.m.	No. 19 TCU*	Gerald J. Ford Stadium; University Park, TX (rivalry)		L 13–20	20,112
*Non-conference game; ^{†}Homecoming; Rankings from AP Poll released prior to the game; All times are in Central time

== Roster ==
2003 SMU Mustangs football team roster
Players
Coaches
Offense

Pos.	#	Name	Class
QB	13	Richard Bartel	So
FB	20	Derron Brown	Jr
WR	18	Jay’Mond Cleveland	Fr
WR	21	Chris Cunningham	Sr
C/OG/LS	63	Grant Eidson	So
RB	25	Johnnie Fitzgerald	Fr
WR	83	Trey Griffin	Jr
OT	75	Sterling Harris	Sr
TE	49	Trent Hrncir	Sr
RB	32	Keylon Kincade	Sr
OT	60	Eric Neal	Jr
WR	85	Reynaldo Pellerin	Fr
QB	7	Chris Phillips	Fr
C	69	Steve Reindl	Sr
WR	10	Matt Rushbrook	Jr
QB	11	Tate Wallis	So
WR	2	Blake Warren	Fr
RB	43	Keith Williams	Jr

Defense

Pos.	#	Name	Class
DT	14	Allan Adami	Sr
CB	22	Anthony Barnett	Fr
LB	46	Brian Bischoff	Sr
DT	56	Brandon Bonds	Fr
LB	53	Reggie Carrington	Fr
FS	16	Jamey Harper	So
SS	6	Rico Harris	Jr
CB	26	Rolando Humphrey	So
DE	30	Don Ieremia-Stansbury	So
LB	45	Jerrian James	Sr
LB	38	D.D. Johnson	Sr
DT	96	Desmond Jones	Fr
LB	35	D.D. Lee	Jr
CB	4	Ruben Moodley	Sr
FS	27	Alvin Nnabuife	So
DE	40	Justin Rogers	Fr
CB	3	Jonas Rutledge	Sr
DE	90	Melvin Williams	Jr

Special teams

Pos.	#	Name	Class
K	31	Chris McMurtray	So
P	41	Ryan Mentzel	So

Head coach

- Phil Bennett

Coordinators/assistant coaches

Legend

- (C) Team captain
- (S) Suspended
- (I) Ineligible
- Injured
- Redshirt

Roster
Last update: 2003-08-31

== Team players in the NFL ==
No SMU players were selected in the 2004 NFL draft.

The following finished their college career in 2003, were not drafted, but played in the NFL.

Player	Position	First NFL team
Keylon Kincade	Running back	New York Giants
