= Tony Barker =

American football player (born 1968)

No. 98
- Position: Linebacker

Personal information
- Born: September 7, 1968 (age 58); Wichita, Kansas, U.S.
- Listed height: 6 ft 2 in (1.88 m)
- Listed weight: 230 lb (104 kg)

Career information
- High school: Wichita Northwest
- College: Rice
- NFL draft: 1992: 10th round, 280th overall pick

Career history
- Washington Redskins (1992); Green Bay Packers (1994)*
- * Offseason or practice squad member only

Awards and highlights
- First-team All-Southwest Conference (1991)
- Stats at Pro Football Reference

Anthony Ray Barker (born September 7, 1968) is an American former professional football player who was a linebacker in the National Football League (NFL). He played college football for the Kansas Jayhawks before transferring to the Rice Owls following his sophomore year. He was selected by the Washington Redskins in the 10th round of the 1992 NFL draft. He also briefly played for the Green Bay Packers.

== Early life ==
Barker began attending Wichita Northwest High School in Wichita in 1984. While at Northwest, he participated in football, basketball, and shot put/discus in track and field. However, he gave up basketball after his junior year. As a high school football player, he played offensive tackle, defensive end and punter. In his senior year, he was a 1st Team All-City selection as an offensive tackle, defensive end, and punter, best 11 in the state from Wichita and Topeka newspapers, and honorable mention in the 1986 High School All-American football team voting.

Barker was voted to the Wichita Eagle's all-time Wichita High School Football team as a 1st team offensive tackle. Also on that team was former Detroit Lions Defensive end Lawrence Pete (who went to South), Linebackers Mark (Seattle Seahawks/Indianapolis Colts) and Mike Bell (Kansas City Chiefs) (Both went to Bishop Carroll), Pro-Football Hall of fame running back Barry Sanders (North), and Tennessee Titans Linebacker Kamerion Wimbley, who is (like Barker) a Northwest alumni.

== College career ==
Barker was recruited by multiple Division I programs. Barker's final selection came down to Kansas and Oklahoma State and with encouragement from his parents, he picked Kansas. He was recruited as a defensive end, but while watching film of another recruit, his coaches noticed his speed and decided to switch him to linebacker.

After the 1987 season, head coach Bob Valesente was fired and Glen Mason took over. Because of the coaching change, Barker transferred to Rice after his sophomore season. By NCAA regulations he had to be redshirted his junior year. He lettered in football in 1990 and 1991. In 1991, he collected 127 tackles, tied for the fifth highest single-season total in team history. That same year, he finished with five interceptions, eighth on the team single-season list. He made the All-Southwest Conference that year and won the Jess Neely Linebacker Award.

=== College statistics ===
Year	Team	Tckls	Sacks	Ints	FF	FR	TD
1987	Kansas	11	0	0	0	1	0
1988	Kansas	70	0	1	0	0	0
1989	Rice	DNP — Red Shirted					
1990	Rice	44	1	0	0	1	1
1991	Rice	127	0	5	4	3	1
Total		252	1	6	4	5	1

== Professional career ==
=== NFL draft ===
After the NFL combine, the Cincinnati Bengals and Oakland Raiders expressed interest in Barker. Ultimately, he was drafted by the Super Bowl champion Washington Redskins in the 10th round (280th overall pick) in the 1992 NFL draft.

=== Washington Redskins ===
He signed a 1-year contract worth $110,000, the league minimum at the time, a common occurrence for late-round picks. Barker was released during the preseason, but was eventually re-signed. He also spent a portion of the 1992 season on the Redskins practice squad. As a rookie, he mainly played on special teams, but had two starts at outside linebacker against the Kansas City Chiefs and the Seattle Seahawks. After the season, Barker's contract expired and Joe Gibbs retired. Following Gibbs's retirement, Richie Petitbon took over and chose not to renew Barker's contract.

=== Green Bay Packers ===
Barker was reunited with the coach that recruited him at Kansas, Bob Valesente, when the Green Bay Packers signed him before their 1994 training camp. He was released two days before the first pre-season game.

=== Retirement ===
Barker decided not continue his career, despite several offers from minor league teams and the Scottish Claymores of NFL Europa (then, NFL Europe). He finished his NFL career recording no official statistics, due in part to tackles not being officially recorded until 2001, and eight games played with two starts.

== Personal life ==
Barker resides in Texas He married his wife in March 2005. He has two children, from a previous marriage and two stepchildren from his wife's previous marriage.
