= 2002 SMU Mustangs football team =

American college football season

2002 SMU Mustangs football
- Conference: Western Athletic Conference
- Record: 3–9 (3–5 WAC)
- Head coach: Phil Bennett (1st season)
- Offensive coordinator: Larry Edmondson (1st season)
- Offensive scheme: Pro-style
- Defensive coordinator: Jim Gush (1st season)
- Base defense: 4–3
- Home stadium: Gerald J. Ford Stadium

2002 Western Athletic Conference football standings
	Conf.			Overall
Team	W		L	W		L
No. 15 Boise State $	8	–	0	12	–	1
Hawaii	7	–	1	10	–	4
Fresno State	6	–	2	9	–	5
San Jose State	4	–	4	6	–	7
Nevada	4	–	4	5	–	7
Rice	3	–	5	4	–	7
Louisiana Tech	3	–	5	4	–	8
SMU	3	–	5	3	–	9
UTEP	1	–	7	2	–	10
Tulsa	1	–	7	1	–	11
$ – Conference champion; Rankings from AP Poll

The 2002 SMU Mustangs football team represented Southern Methodist University (SMU) as a member the Western Athletic Conference (WAC) during the 2002 NCAA Division I-A football season. Led by first-year head coach Phil Bennett, the Mustangs compiled an overall record of 3–9 with a mark of 3–5 in conference play, tying for sixth place in the WAC.

== Schedule ==
Date	Time	Opponent	Site	TV	Result	Attendance
August 31	7:00 p.m.	Navy*	Gerald J. Ford Stadium; University Park, TX		L 7–38	25,744
September 7	7:00 p.m.	Texas Tech*	Gerald J. Ford Stadium; University Park, TX		L 14–24	32,000
September 14	6:00 p.m.	at TCU*	Amon G. Carter Stadium; Fort Worth, TX (rivalry)		L 6–17	30,621
September 21	6:00 p.m.	at Oklahoma State*	Lewis Field; Stillwater, OK		L 16–52	41,190
September 28	10:05 p.m.	at Hawaii	Aloha Stadium; Honolulu, HI		L 10–42	36,096
October 5	2:00 p.m.	San Jose State	Gerald J. Ford Stadium; University Park, TX		L 23–34	13,016
October 12	9:30 p.m.	at Fresno State	Bulldog Stadium; Fresno, CA	FSN	L 7–30	41,031
October 19	2:00 p.m.	Louisiana Tech^{†}	Gerald J. Ford Stadium; University Park, TX		W 37–34	14,836
October 26	2:00 p.m.	at Rice	Rice Stadium; Houston, TX (rivalry)		L 15–27	10,845
November 2	2:00 p.m.	Nevada	Gerald J. Ford Stadium; University Park, TX		L 6–24	11,832
November 16	4:05 p.m.	at UTEP	Sun Bowl; El Paso, TX		W 42–35	21,765
November 23	2:00 p.m.	Tulsa	Gerald J. Ford Stadium; University Park, TX		W 24–21	12,324
*Non-conference game; ^{†}Homecoming; All times are in Central time

=== Roster ===
2002 SMU Mustangs football team roster
Players
Coaches
Offense

Pos.	#	Name	Class
RB	2	ShanDerrick Charles	So
WR	5	Johnnie Freeman	Sr
WR	7	Daniel Francis	Fr
QB	11	Tate Wallis	Fr
QB	13	Richard Bartel	Fr
WR	15	Jay Taylor	So
WR	17	Billy Ford	Sr
RB	20	Derron Brown	So
RB	24	Kris Briggs	Sr
WR	25	Cody Cardwell	Sr
RB	32	Keylon Kincade	Jr
TE	49	Trent Hrncir	Jr
OL	63	Grant Eidson	Fr
OT	75	Sterling Harris	Jr
OT	76	Judson Davis	Sr
WR	81	Cedric Vison	Fr
TE	86	John Hampton	Sr

Defense

Pos.	#	Name	Class
CB	1	Kevin Garrett	Sr
S	8	Leroy Price	Jr
DE	9	Khalid Beard	Sr
DB	12	Charles Akinyemi	So
DT	14	Allan Adami	Jr
DB	26	Rolando Humphrey	Fr
SS	27	Alvin Nnabuife	So
S	29	Brent Briggs	Sr
DE	30	Don Ieremia-Stansbury	Fr
LB	35	D. D. Lee	So
LB	38	D. D. Johnson	Sr
CB	39	James Orr	Sr
LB	42	Billy Jack Williams	Sr
LB	45	Jarrian James	Jr
LB	46	Brian Bischoff	Jr
DT	92	Lute Croy	Sr
DT	93	Brent Karrington	Fr
DE	95	Brad Bean	Sr

Special teams

Pos.	#	Name	Class
P	41	Ryan Mentzel	Fr

Head coach

- Phil Bennett

Coordinators/assistant coaches

- Phil Jones (special teams / tight ends / offensive tackles)

Legend

- (C) Team captain
- (S) Suspended
- (I) Ineligible
- Injured
- Redshirt

Roster
Last update: 2002-10-05

== Team players drafted into the NFL ==
Player	Position	Round	Pick	NFL club
Kevin Garrett	Defensive Back	5	172	St. Louis Rams
