= 2003 Tulsa Golden Hurricane football team =

American college football season

2003 Tulsa Golden Hurricane football

Humanitarian Bowl, L 10–52 vs. Georgia Tech
- Conference: Western Athletic Conference
- Record: 8–5 (6–2 WAC)
- Head coach: Steve Kragthorpe (1st season)
- Offensive coordinator: Charlie Stubbs (1st season)
- Offensive scheme: Multiple
- Defensive coordinator: Todd Graham (1st season)
- Base defense: 3–3–5
- Home stadium: Skelly Stadium

2003 Western Athletic Conference football standings
	Conf.			Overall
Team	W		L	W		L
No. 16 Boise State $	8	–	0	13	–	1
Fresno State	6	–	2	9	–	5
Tulsa	6	–	2	8	–	5
Hawaii	5	–	3	9	–	5
Rice	5	–	3	5	–	7
Nevada	4	–	4	6	–	6
Louisiana Tech	3	–	5	5	–	7
San Jose State	2	–	6	3	–	8
UTEP	1	–	7	2	–	10
SMU	0	–	8	0	–	12
$ – Conference champion; Rankings from AP Poll

The 2003 Tulsa Golden Hurricane football team represented the University of Tulsa as a member of the Western Athletic Conference (WAC) during the 2003 NCAA Division I-A football season. Led by first-year head coach Steve Kragthorpe, the Golden Hurricane compiled an overall record of 8–5 with a mark of 6–2 in conference play, tying for second place in the WAC. Tulsa was invited to the Humanitarian Bowl, where the Golden Hurricane lost to Georgia Tech. The team played home games at Skelly Stadium in Tulsa, Oklahoma.

== Schedule ==
Date	Time	Opponent	Site	TV	Result	Attendance
August 30	6:00 pm	at Minnesota*	Hubert H. Humphrey Metrodome; Minneapolis, MN		L 10–49	36,623
September 6	6:00 pm	at Arkansas*	Donald W. Reynolds Razorback Stadium; Fayetteville, AR		L 13–45	69,442
September 13	6:00 pm	Texas State*	Skelly Stadium; Tulsa, OK		W 41–15	35,805
September 20	6:00 pm	Arkansas State*	Skelly Stadium; Tulsa, OK		W 54–7	16,231
October 4	6:00 pm	Hawaii	Skelly Stadium; Tulsa, OK	SPW	W 27–16	17,342
October 11	7:00 pm	at Boise State	Bronco Stadium; Boise, ID	SPW	L 21–28	29,719
October 18	2:00 pm	Nevada	Skelly Stadium; Tulsa, OK		L 21–28	17,816
October 25	2:00 pm	SMU^{†}	Skelly Stadium; Tulsa, OK		W 35–16	16,733
November 1	4:05 pm	at UTEP	Sun Bowl; El Paso, TX		W 56–28	17,095
November 8	2:00 pm	at Rice	Rice Stadium; Houston, TX		W 31–28	10,846
November 15	2:00 pm	Louisiana Tech	Skelly Stadium; Tulsa, OK		W 48–18	28,862
November 22	2:00 pm	at San Jose State	Spartan Stadium; San Jose, CA		W 34–32	7,618
January 3	11:00 am	vs. Georgia Tech*	Bronco Stadium; Boise, ID (Humanitarian Bowl)	ESPN	L 10–52	23,118
*Non-conference game; ^{†}Homecoming; All times are in Central time
