= 2000 Fresno State Bulldogs football team =

American college football season

2000 Fresno State Bulldogs football
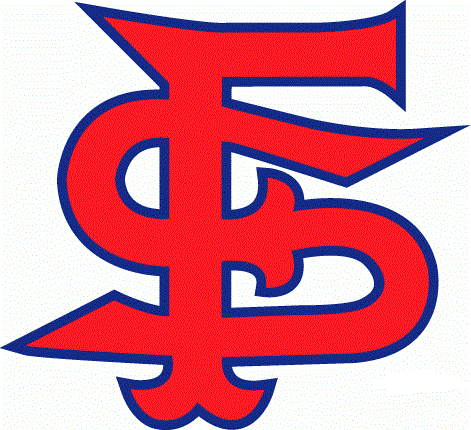

Silicon Valley Football Classic, L 34–37 vs. Air Force
- Conference: Western Athletic Conference
- Record: 7–5 (6–2 WAC)
- Head coach: Pat Hill (4th season)
- Offensive coordinator: Andy Ludwig (3rd season)
- Offensive scheme: Spread
- Defensive coordinator: Kevin Coyle (4th season)
- Base defense: 4–3
- Home stadium: Bulldog Stadium

2000 Western Athletic Conference football standings
	Conf.			Overall
Team	W		L	W		L
No. 21 TCU +	7	–	1	10	–	2
UTEP +	7	–	1	8	–	4
Fresno State	6	–	2	7	–	5
San Jose State	5	–	3	7	–	5
Tulsa	4	–	4	5	–	7
Rice	2	–	6	3	–	8
Hawaii	2	–	6	3	–	9
SMU	2	–	6	3	–	9
Nevada	1	–	7	2	–	10
+ – Conference co-champions; Rankings from AP Poll

The 2000 Fresno State Bulldogs football team represented California State University, Fresno as a member of the Western Athletic Conference (WAC) during the 2000 NCAA Division I-A football season. Led by fourth-year head coach Pat Hill, the Bulldogs compiled an overall record of 7–5 with a mark of 6–2 in conference play, placing third in the WAC. Fresno State was invited to the Silicon Valley Football Classic, where the Bulldogs lost to Air Force. The team played home games at Bulldog Stadium in Fresno, California.

== Schedule ==
Date	Time	Opponent	Site	TV	Result	Attendance
September 2	9:00 am	at No. 15 Ohio State*	Ohio Stadium; Columbus, OH	ESPN Plus	L 10–43	96,583
September 9	4:30 pm	at No. 16 UCLA*	Rose Bowl; Pasadena, CA	BSN	L 21–24	45,605
September 23	7:15 pm	California*	Bulldog Stadium; Fresno, CA	FSN	W 17–3	42,285
October 5	4:00 pm	at Rice	Rice Stadium; Houston, TX	FSN	W 27–24	10,384
October 14	7:00 pm	Nevada^{†}	Bulldog Stadium; Fresno, CA		W 58–21	41,128
October 21	6:05 pm	at UTEP	Sun Bowl Stadium; El Paso, TX	BSN	L 13–23	52,085
October 28	7:00 pm	Tulsa	Bulldog Stadium; Fresno, CA		W 34–12	41,088
November 4	4:00 pm	Hawaii	Bulldog Stadium; Fresno, CA (rivalry)	BSN	W 45–27	42,160
November 11	12:30 pm	at No. 18 TCU	Amon G. Carter Stadium; Fort Worth, TX	FSN	L 7–24	29,116
November 18	4:00 pm	SMU	Bulldog Stadium; Fresno, CA	BSN	W 14–7	40,184
November 25	12:30 pm	at San Jose State	Spartan Stadium; San Jose, CA (rivalry)	BSN	W 37–6	17,681
December 31	3:00 pm	vs. Air Force*	Spartan Stadium; San Jose, CA (Silicon Valley Football Classic)	FSN	L 34–37	26,542
*Non-conference game; ^{†}Homecoming; Rankings from AP Poll released prior to the game; All times are in Pacific time
