= 2000 Rice Owls football team =

American college football season

2000 Rice Owls football
- Conference: Western Athletic Conference
- Record: 3–8 (2–6 WAC)
- Head coach: Ken Hatfield (7th season)
- Offensive coordinator: David Lee (7th season)
- Defensive coordinator: Roger Hinshaw (3rd season)
- Home stadium: Rice Stadium

2000 Western Athletic Conference football standings
	Conf.			Overall
Team	W		L	W		L
No. 21 TCU +	7	–	1	10	–	2
UTEP +	7	–	1	8	–	4
Fresno State	6	–	2	7	–	5
San Jose State	5	–	3	7	–	5
Tulsa	4	–	4	5	–	7
Rice	2	–	6	3	–	8
Hawaii	2	–	6	3	–	9
SMU	2	–	6	3	–	9
Nevada	1	–	7	2	–	10
+ – Conference co-champions; Rankings from AP Poll

The 2000 Rice Owls football team represented Rice University as a member of the Western Athletic Conference (WAC) during the 2000 NCAA Division I-A football season. In their seventh year under head coach Ken Hatfield, the Owls compiled an overall record of 3–8 record with a mark of 2–6 in conference play, placing in a three-way tie for sixth in the WAC. The team played home games at Rice Stadium in Houston.

== Schedule ==
Date	Time	Opponent	Site	TV	Result	Attendance	Source
September 2	7:00 pm	Houston*	Rice Stadium; Houston, TX (rivalry)		W 30–27 ^{OT}	40,714	
September 7	11:00 am	at No. 3 Michigan*	Michigan Stadium; Ann Arbor, MI	ESPN Plus	L 7–38	109,778	
September 16	2:30 pm	Tulsa	Rice Stadium; Houston, TX	FSN	L 16–23	10,868	
September 23	11:30 am	at No. 17 Oklahoma*	Oklahoma Memorial Stadium; Norman, OK	FSN	L 14–42	74,794	
September 30	2:30 pm	at San Jose State	Spartan Stadium; San Jose, CA	FSN	L 16–29	6,743	
October 5	6:00 pm	Fresno State	Rice Stadium; Houston, TX	FSN	L 24–27	10,384	
October 21	2:30 pm	Hawaii	Rice Stadium; Houston, TX	FSN	W 38–13	22,521	
October 28	2:00 pm	at No. 11 TCU	Amon G. Carter Stadium; Fort Worth, TX		L 0–37	30,762	
November 4	2:00 pm	SMU^{†}	Rice Stadium; Houston, TX (rivalry)		W 43–14	11,418	
November 11	8:05 pm	at UTEP	Sun Bowl; El Paso, TX		L 21–38	53,304	
November 18	2:05 pm	at Nevada	Mackay Stadium; Reno, NV		L 28–34	13,482	
*Non-conference game; ^{†}Homecoming; Rankings from AP Poll released prior to the game; All times are in Central time
