= Pat Henderson (American football) =

American football coach (born c. 1952–1953)

Current position
- Title: Assistant athletic director
- Team: Kansas
- Conference: Big 12

Biographical details
- Born: c. 1952 or 1953 (age 73–74); Kansas City, Missouri, U.S.
- Education: University of Kansas (1975); University of Nebraska Omaha (1980)

Playing career
- 1970–1974: Kansas
- Position: Defensive back

Coaching career (HC unless noted)
- 1975–1977: Coffeyville (DB)
- 1978–1979: Nebraska–Omaha (DB)
- 1980–1982: Indiana State (DC)
- 1983–1984: Tulsa (LB)
- 1985–1989: Arizona State (DB)
- 1990–1993: Purdue (ST/DB)
- 1993: Purdue (interim DC/ST/DB)
- 1994–1996: TCU (DC/LB)
- 1997–1999: Tulsa (DC/LB)
- 1999: Tulsa (interim HC)
- 2000–2001: SMU (ST/DT/DB)
- 2002–2004: Kansas (DB)

Administrative career (AD unless noted)
- 2005–present: Kansas (assistant AD)

Head coaching record
- Overall: 1–3

Pat Henderson (born c. 1952 or 1953) is an American college football administrator and former coach. He is an assistant athletic director for the University of Kansas. He was the interim head football coach for the University of Tulsa in 1999. He also coached for Coffeyville Community College, Nebraska–Omaha, Indiana State, Tulsa, Arizona State, Purdue, TCU, SMU, and Kansas. He played college football for Kansas as a defensive back.

== Head coaching record ==
Year	Team	Overall	Conference	Standing	Bowl/playoffs
Tulsa Golden Hurricane (Western Athletic Conference) (1999)
1999	Tulsa	1–3 (Note: Henderson was named interim head coach with four weeks remaining in the season following the firing of David Rader.)	1–2	8th	
Tulsa:		1–3	1–2		
Total:		1–3			
