= Mike Calhoun (quarterback) =

American football player (born 1961)

No. 4, 6
- Position: Quarterback

Personal information
- Born: March 4, 1961 (age 65)
- Listed height: 6 ft 1 in (1.85 m)
- Listed weight: 195 lb (88 kg)

Career information
- High school: Hirschi (Wichita Falls, Texas)
- College: Taft JC (1979–1980); Rice (1981–1982)
- NFL draft: 1983: undrafted

Career history
- Montreal Concordes (1983); San Antonio Gunslingers (1985)*; Washington Commandos (1987); Detroit Drive (1988)
- * Offseason or practice squad member only

Awards and highlights
- ArenaBowl champion (1988)
- Stats at ArenaFan.com

Michael Calhoun (born March 4, 1961) is an American former professional football quarterback who played in the Canadian Football League (CFL) and Arena Football League (AFL). He played college football for the Rice Owls.

== Early life and college ==
Michael Calhoun was born March 4, 1961. He attended Hirschi High School in Wichita Falls, Texas.

Calhoun first played college football at Taft Junior College from 1979 to 1980. He transferred to play for the Rice Owls of Rice University, and was a two-year letterman from 1981 to 1982. He completed 98 of 233 passes (42.1%) for 1,480 yards, 21 touchdowns, and 15 interceptions in 1981 while also rushing for 338 yards and one touchdown. His 21 passing touchdowns were the most in the Southwest Conference that season. Calhoun split time with Doug Johnson in 1982, recording 51 completions on 115 passing attempts (44.3%) for 681 yards, five touchdowns, and seven interceptions, and one rushing touchdown.

== Professional career ==
Calhoun went undrafted in the 1983 NFL draft and thereafter signed with the Montreal Concordes of the Canadian Football League. He dressed in four games for the Concordes in 1983, throwing two incomplete passes and also catching one pass for eight yards. He was released in 1984.

Calhoun signed with the San Antonio Gunslingers of the United States Football League in 1985. However, he was released soon later on January 28, 1985.

Calgoun was signed by the Washington Commandos of the Arena Football League (AFL) in 1987. He played in all six games for the Commanders during the AFL's inaugural 1987 season, totaling four completions on 12 passing attempts (33.3%) for 50 yards, one touchdown, and one interception, five carries for five yards, one kick return for 16 yards, and two solo tackles.

Calhoun signed with the Detroit Drive of the AFL in 1988. He appeared in four games that year, recording three receptions for 35 yards, three solo tackles, one assisted tackle, one interception return for 36 yards, and one kick return for 16 yards.
