= Gary Nord =

American football player and coach (born 1957)

Biographical details
- Born: June 12, 1957 (age 69); Louisville, Kentucky, U.S.

Playing career
- 1975–1978: Louisville
- Position: Tight end

Coaching career (HC unless noted)
- 1981–1984: Louisville (TE)
- 1985–1986: Louisville (RB)
- 1987–1988: Louisville (WR)
- 1989–1994: Louisville (OC/QB)
- 1995: Oklahoma (OC)
- 1996: Pittsburgh (WR)
- 1997–1999: UTEP (OC)
- 2000–2003: UTEP
- 2004: Florida Atlantic (QB)
- 2005–2008: Florida Atlantic (OC/QB)
- 2009–2012: Purdue (AHC/OC/QB)

Head coaching record
- Overall: 14–34
- Bowls: 0–1

Accomplishments and honors

Championships
- 1 WAC (2000)

Awards
- WAC Coach of the Year (2000)

Gary Nord (born June 12, 1957) is an American former college football player and coach. Nord was the head football coach as the University of Texas at El Paso (UTEP) from 2000 to 2003, he compiling a record of 14–34. He led the 2000 UTEP Miners football team to a Western Athletic Conference (WAC) title and a berth in the 2000 Humanitarian Bowl, UTEP's first bowl game since 1988, where they lost to the 2000 Boise State Broncos football team.

Nord most recently served as offensive coordinator and quarterbacks coach at Purdue University. He was named to the position on December 1, 2008, and was relieved of his duties following the 2012 season. He also worked an assistant coach at the University of Louisville, the University of Oklahoma, the University of Pittsburgh, and Florida Atlantic University. Nord is a long-time associate of Howard Schnellenberger, having served on his staffs at three different schools.

Nord filed a lawsuit against Purdue due to a fall he suffered in the weight room that was under construction. He missed the final three games of the 2012 season due to a back injury.

== Head coaching record ==
Year	Team	Overall	Conference	Standing	Bowl/playoffs
UTEP Miners (Western Athletic Conference) (2000–2003)
2000	UTEP	8–4	7–1	T–1st	L Humanitarian
2001	UTEP	2–9	1–7	9th	
2002	UTEP	2–10	1–7	T–9th	
2003	UTEP	2–11	1–7	9th	
UTEP:		14–34	10–22		
Total:		14–34			
National championship Conference title Conference division title or championship game berth
