= Quinton Smith =

American football player (born 1984)

No. 42
- Position: Running back

Personal information
- Born: January 14, 1984 (age 42); Tyler, Texas, U.S.
- Listed height: 5 ft 11 in (1.80 m)
- Listed weight: 200 lb (91 kg)

Career information
- College: Rice
- NFL draft: 2007: undrafted

Career history
- New England Patriots (2007)*; New York Giants (2007)*; New Orleans Saints (2007)*; New York Giants (2007)*; Oakland Raiders (2007)*
- * Offseason or practice squad member only

Awards and highlights
- 2× Second-team All-C-USA (2005-2006)

Quinton Bernard Smith (born January 14, 1984) is an American former football running back. He was signed by the New England Patriots as an undrafted free agent in 2007. He played college football at Rice, where he earned second team C-USA All-Conference honors.

Smith was also a member of the New York Giants, New Orleans Saints, and Oakland Raiders.

== Early life ==
Smith attended Cedar Park High School in Cedar Park, Texas. He finished his career with school records of 57 touchdowns, 4,445 rushing yards, and 4,975 yards of total offense.
