= 1999 Rice Owls football team =

American college football season

1999 Rice Owls football
- Conference: Western Athletic Conference
- Record: 5–6 (5–3 WAC)
- Head coach: Ken Hatfield (6th season)
- Offensive coordinator: David Lee (6th season)
- Defensive coordinator: Roger Hinshaw (2nd season)
- Home stadium: Rice Stadium

1999 Western Athletic Conference football standings
	Conf.			Overall
Team	W		L	W		L
Hawaii +	5	–	2	9	–	4
TCU +	5	–	2	8	–	4
Fresno State +	5	–	2	8	–	5
Rice	4	–	3	5	–	6
SMU	3	–	3	4	–	6
UTEP	3	–	4	5	–	7
San Jose State	1	–	5	3	–	7
Tulsa	1	–	6	2	–	9
+ – Conference co-champions

The 1999 Rice Owls football team represented Rice University as a member of the Western Athletic Conference (WAC) during the 1999 NCAA Division I-A football season. In their sixth year under head coach Ken Hatfield, the Owls compiled an overall record of 5–6 record with a mark of 4–3 in conference play, placing fourth in the WAC. The team played home games at Rice Stadium in Houston.

== Schedule ==
Date	Time	Opponent	Site	TV	Result	Attendance
September 4	7:00 pm	at Houston*	Robertson Stadium; Houston, TX (rivalry)		L 3–28	31,784
September 11	11:00 am	at No. 6 Michigan*	Michigan Stadium; Ann Arbor, MI	ESPN2	L 3–37	110,501
September 18	6:00 pm	at Texas*	Darrell K Royal–Texas Memorial Stadium; Austin, TX	PPV	L 13–18	82,084
September 25	7:00 pm	Navy*	Rice Stadium; Houston, TX		W 20–17	44,217
October 2	11:00 am	at Tulsa	Skelly Stadium; Tulsa, OK	FSN	W 20–10	15,270
October 9	11:05 pm	at Hawaii	Aloha Stadium; Halawa, HI	KNWS	W 38–19	37,975
October 16	11:00 am	San Jose State	Rice Stadium; Houston, TX	FSN	W 49–7	10,213
October 23	2:00 pm	TCU	Rice Stadium; Houston, TX		W 42–21	28,535
October 30	2:00 pm	at SMU	Cotton Bowl; Dallas, TX (rivalry)		L 2–27	16,272
November 6	4:00 pm	at Fresno State	Bulldog Stadium; Fresno, CA		L 18–47	39,097
November 13	2:00 pm	UTEP^{†}	Rice Stadium; Houston, TX		L 29–30	18,235
*Non-conference game; ^{†}Homecoming; Rankings from AP Poll released prior to the game; All times are in Central time
