= 2002 Rice Owls football team =

American college football season

2002 Rice Owls football
- Conference: Western Athletic Conference
- Record: 4–7 (3–5 WAC)
- Head coach: Ken Hatfield (9th season)
- Offensive coordinator: Scott Wachenheim (2nd season)
- Offensive scheme: Triple option
- Defensive coordinator: Roger Hinshaw (5th season)
- Base defense: 3–4
- Home stadium: Rice Stadium

2002 Western Athletic Conference football standings
	Conf.			Overall
Team	W		L	W		L
No. 15 Boise State $	8	–	0	12	–	1
Hawaii	7	–	1	10	–	4
Fresno State	6	–	2	9	–	5
San Jose State	4	–	4	6	–	7
Nevada	4	–	4	5	–	7
Rice	3	–	5	4	–	7
Louisiana Tech	3	–	5	4	–	8
SMU	3	–	5	3	–	9
UTEP	1	–	7	2	–	10
Tulsa	1	–	7	1	–	11
$ – Conference champion; Rankings from AP Poll

The 2002 Rice Owls football team represented Rice University as a member of the Western Athletic Conference (WAC) during the 2002 NCAA Division I-A football season. In their ninth year under head coach Ken Hatfield, the Owls compiled an overall record of 4–7 record with a mark of 3–5 in conference play, placing in a three-way tie for sixth in the WAC. The team played home games at Rice Stadium in Houston.

== Schedule ==
Date	Time	Opponent	Site	TV	Result	Attendance
August 31	7:00 pm	Houston*	Rice Stadium; Houston, TX (rivalry)		L 10–24	30,747
September 7	12:00 pm	at No. 15 Michigan State*	Spartan Stadium; East Lansing, MI		L 10–27	74,014
September 21	3:00 pm	at Nevada	Mackay Stadium; Reno, NV		L 21–31	17,201
September 28	7:00 pm	Fresno State	Rice Stadium; Houston, TX		L 28–31	18,143
October 5	7:00 pm	Louisiana Tech	Reliant Stadium; Houston, TX		W 37–20	20,895
October 12	11:00 am	at Navy*	Navy–Marine Corps Memorial Stadium; Annapolis, MD		W 17–10	25,104
October 19	9:15 pm	at UTEP	Sun Bowl; El Paso, TX	FSN	L 35–38	32,392
October 25	2:00 pm	SMU	Rice Stadium; Houston, TX (rivalry)		W 27–15	10,845
November 2	2:00 pm	at Tulsa	Skelly Stadium; Tulsa, OK		W 33–18	12,587
November 9	2:05 pm	at Boise State	Bronco Stadium; Boise, ID		L 7–49	23,962
November 16	2:00 pm	Hawaii^{†}	Rice Stadium; Houston, TX		L 28–33	19,714
*Non-conference game; ^{†}Homecoming; Rankings from AP Poll released prior to the game; All times are in Central time
