= Trevor Cobb =

American football player (born 1970)

No. 45, 43, 22
- Position: Running back

Personal information
- Born: November 20, 1970 (age 55); Houston, Texas, U.S.
- Listed height: 5 ft 9 in (1.75 m)
- Listed weight: 209 lb (95 kg)

Career information
- High school: Dobie (Houston, Texas)
- College: Rice
- NFL draft: 1993: undrafted

Career history
- Kansas City Chiefs (1993); Pittsburgh Steelers (1994)*; Chicago Bears (1994); Amsterdam Admirals (1996)
- * Offseason or practice squad member only

Awards and highlights
- Doak Walker Award (1991); Consensus All-American (1991); Second-team All-American (1992); 3× First-team All-SWC (1990, 1991, 1992)
- Stats at Pro Football Reference
- College Football Hall of Fame

Trevor Sebastian Cobb (born November 20, 1970) is an American former professional football player who was a running back for the Chicago Bears of the National Football League (NFL). He played college football for the Rice Owls football, and earned consensus All-American honors in 1991.

== Early life ==
Cobb was born in Houston, Texas. He graduated from J. Frank Dobie High School in Houston, Texas, where he played high school football for the Dobie Longhorns.

== College career ==
Cobb received an athletic scholarship to attend Rice University in Houston, and played for the Owls teams from 1989 to 1993. As a junior in 1991, he amassed 1,692 yards rushing and 14 touchdowns, won the Doak Walker Award as the nation's best running back, and was recognized as a consensus first-team All-American. In his four college seasons, he rushed for 4,948 yards and 38 touchdowns.

Year	Team	Games	Rushes	Rushing Yards	YPA	Rushing TDs	Receptions	Receiving Yards	Receiving TDs
1989	Rice	11	169	545	3.2	3	22	161	1
1990	Rice	11	283	1,325	4.7	10	36	312	0
1991	Rice	11	360	1,692	4.7	14	14	136	0
1992	Rice	11	279	1,386	5.0	11	22	283	4
Total		44	1091	4948	4.5	38	94	892	5

== Professional career ==
Unselected in the 1993 NFL draft, he signed with the Chicago Bears as an undrafted free agent.
