= 2003 Rice Owls football team =

American college football season

2003 Rice Owls football
- Conference: Western Athletic Conference
- Record: 5–7 (5–3 WAC)
- Head coach: Ken Hatfield (10th season)
- Offensive coordinator: Scott Wachenheim (3rd season)
- Offensive scheme: Triple option
- Defensive coordinator: Roger Hinshaw (6th season)
- Base defense: 3–4
- Home stadium: Rice Stadium

2003 Western Athletic Conference football standings
	Conf.			Overall
Team	W		L	W		L
No. 16 Boise State $	8	–	0	13	–	1
Fresno State	6	–	2	9	–	5
Tulsa	6	–	2	8	–	5
Hawaii	5	–	3	9	–	5
Rice	5	–	3	5	–	7
Nevada	4	–	4	6	–	6
Louisiana Tech	3	–	5	5	–	7
San Jose State	2	–	6	3	–	8
UTEP	1	–	7	2	–	10
SMU	0	–	8	0	–	12
$ – Conference champion; Rankings from AP Poll

The 2003 Rice Owls football team represented Rice University as a member of the Western Athletic Conference (WAC) during the 2003 NCAA Division I-A football season. In their tenth year under head coach Ken Hatfield, the Owls compiled an overall record of 5–7 record with a mark of 5–3 in conference play, tying for fourth place in the WAC. The team played home games at Rice Stadium in Houston.

== Schedule ==
Date	Time	Opponent	Site	TV	Result	Attendance
August 30	7:00 pm	at Houston*	Robertson Stadium; Houston, TX (rivalry)		L 14–48	25,355
September 13	5:00 pm	at Duke*	Wallace Wade Stadium; Durham, NC		L 24–27 ^{OT}	18,742
September 20	8:15 pm	No. 13 Texas*	Reliant Stadium; Houston, TX	ESPN2	L 7–48	45,764
September 27	11:00 pm	at Hawaii	Aloha Stadium; Halawa, HI	SPW	L 21–41	40,040
October 4	7:00 pm	San Jose State	Rice Stadium; Houston, TX		W 28–24	15,153
October 18	2:00 pm	Navy*	Rice Stadium; Houston, TX		L 6–38	27,832
October 25	6:00 pm	at Fresno State	Bulldog Stadium; Fresno, CA	SPW	L 28–31	39,462
November 1	2:00 pm	Nevada	Rice Stadium; Houston, TX		W 52–42	13,011
November 8	2:00 pm	Tulsa^{†}	Rice Stadium; Houston, TX		L 28–31	10,846
November 15	3:00 pm	at SMU	Gerald J. Ford Stadium; Dallas, TX (rivalry)	SPW	W 42–20	11,856
November 22	2:30 pm	UTEP	Rice Stadium; Houston, TX	SPW	W 45–14	10,465
November 29	2:00 pm	at Louisiana Tech	Joe Aillet Stadium; Ruston, LA		W 49–14	8,752
*Non-conference game; ^{†}Homecoming; Rankings from AP Poll released prior to the game; All times are in Central time
