= Eric Schumann =

American football coach

Biographical details
- Born: Blue Island, Illinois

Playing career
- 1974–1977: Alabama
- Position: defensive back

Coaching career (HC unless noted)
- 1978–1981: McAdory HS (AL) (assistant)
- 1982: Troy State (assistant)
- 1983–1985: Valdosta State (assistant)
- 1986: New Mexico (DB)
- 1987–1988: Pierce County HS (GA)
- 1989: Livingston (CB)
- 1990–1991: Valdosta State (DB)
- 1992–1996: East Tennessee State (DC)
- 1997–2001: SMU (DC)
- 2002–2006: Tulane (DC/LB)
- 2007–2010: UAB (DC)

Eric Schumann is an American football coach. His most recent job was as defensive coordinator at University of Alabama at Birmingham (UAB) from 2007 to 2010.

He served the previous four years as defensive coordinator of Tulane, and has coached defense at SMU, New Mexico, and Troy State. He was a defensive back at Alabama from 1974 to 1977.

His son Glenn is currently the defensive coordinator at Georgia.
