= Keith Williams (American football coach) =

American football coach (born 1971)

New Orleans Saints
- Title: Wide receivers coach

Personal information
- Born: June 18, 1971 (age 55); Lima, Ohio, U.S.

Career information
- Position: Wide receiver
- High school: Tokay (Lodi, California)
- College: San Diego State (1990–1993)
- NFL draft: 1994: undrafted

Career history

Playing
- Washington Redskins (1994)*; Amsterdam Admirals (1995); Saskatchewan Roughriders (1995–1996)
- * Offseason or practice squad member only

Coaching
- Solano (2000) Wide receivers coach; San Jose State (2001–2004) Wide receivers coach; San Jose City (2005–2008) Offensive coordinator & wide receivers coach; Fresno State (2009–2011) Wide receivers coach; Tulane (2012–2014) Wide receivers coach; Nebraska (2015–2017) Wide receivers coach; San Antonio Commanders (2019) Wide receivers coach; Baltimore Ravens (2021–2022) Pass game specialist; Baltimore Ravens (2023) Assistant wide receivers coach; New Orleans Saints (2024–present) Wide receivers coach

Keith Williams (born June 18, 1971) is an American football coach and former player who is currently the wide receivers coach for the New Orleans Saints of the National Football League (NFL). He has also served as a personal wide receivers coach for a number of top NFL wideouts, including All-Pros Davante Adams and Tyreek Hill.

== Early life ==
Williams was born on June 18, 1971, in Lima, Ohio. He attended Tokay High School in Lodi, California, where he played both football, as a wide receiver and a safety, and competed in track and field, earning All-San Joaquin County Section honors in both sports. He holds the 100M (10.44) and 200M (21.2) records at Tokay.

== College career ==
Williams played college football as a wide receiver for the San Diego State Aztecs.

=== Statistics ===
Year	Team	GP	Receiving				Returning			
Year	Team	GP	Rec	Yds	Avg	TD	Ret	Yds	Avg	TD
1990	San Diego State	11	3	50	16.7	0	9	204	22.7	0
1991	San Diego State	12	3	66	22.0	1	7	78	11.1	0
1992	San Diego State	11	25	345	13.8	4	5	70	14.0	0
1993	San Diego State	12	20	305	15.3	3	6	87	14.5	0
Career		46	51	766	15.0	8	27	439	16.3	0

== Professional career ==
Following his collegiate career, Williams signed a free agent contract with the Washington Redskins and later played professionally for both the Amsterdam Admirals of the World League of American Football and for the Saskatchewan Roughriders of the Canadian Football League.

== Coaching career ==
=== Solano ===
Williams started his coaching career in 2000 at Solano Community College.

=== San Jose State ===
In 2001, Williams began a four-year stint as the receivers coach for San Jose State under head coach Fitz Hill, where he tutored four Spartans, who ranked among the SJSU record books for most career receiving yards.

=== San Jose City ===
In 2005, Williams took a position as the offensive coordinator and wide receivers coach for San Jose City College.

=== Fresno State ===
Keith Williams joined the Fresno State coaching staff on February 24, 2009. He served as their wide receivers coach until 2011.

=== Tulane ===
In 2012, Williams began coaching wide receivers at Tulane. In 2014, he also served as the out-of-state recruiting coordinator for the Green Wave.

=== Nebraska ===
On January 21, 2015, Williams was hired by Nebraska as their wide receivers coach.

=== San Antonio Commanders ===
In the spring of 2019, Williams served as wide receivers coach for the San Antonio Commanders of the now-defunct Alliance of American Football (AAF). The move reunited him with former Nebraska head coach Mike Riley.

=== Baltimore Ravens ===
In 2019, Williams began working with the Baltimore Ravens coaching staff. He spent the first two years as passing game specialist before assuming the role of assistant wide receivers coach in 2023.

=== New Orleans Saints ===
On February 20, 2024, the New Orleans Saints hired Williams as their wide receivers coach.

== Personal life ==
Williams and his wife, Ayana, have a son, Keyan, who played wide receiver at Ball State, Nebraska and Fresno State and currently works as the wide receivers coach for Sam Houston State, and a daughter, Kaya, who played soccer at Jacksonville University and Lamar University.

He earned his bachelor's degree in public administration in 1996.

In August 2016, Williams was involved in a crash with two other vehicles. He registered a BAC above .15 and was cited for a DUI.
