= Louisiana Tech Bulldogs football statistical leaders =

The Louisiana Tech Bulldogs football statistical leaders are individual statistical leaders of the Louisiana Tech Bulldogs football program in various categories, including passing, rushing, receiving, total offense, defensive stats, and kicking. Within those areas, the lists identify single-game, single-season, and career leaders. The Bulldogs represent Louisiana Tech University in the NCAA's Conference USA (C-USA).

Although Louisiana Tech began competing in intercollegiate football in 1901, the school's official record book does not generally include records from before the 1950s, as records from before this period are often incomplete and inconsistent.

These lists are dominated by more recent players for several reasons:

- Since the 1950s, seasons have increased from 10 games to 11 and then 12 games in length.
- The NCAA didn't allow freshmen to play varsity football until 1972 (with the exception of the World War II years), allowing players to have four-year careers.
- Bowl games only began counting toward single-season and career statistics in 2002. The Bulldogs have played in six bowl games since this decision, giving many recent players an extra game to accumulate statistics.
- The Bulldogs have also played in the C-USA Championship Game twice since joining the league in 2013 (specifically in 2014 and 2016), giving players in those seasons another extra game in which to accumulate statistics.

These lists are updated through the end of the 2025 season.

== Passing ==
=== Passing yards ===
Career
Rk	Player	Yards	Years
1	Luke McCown	12,994	2000 2001 2002 2003
2	Tim Rattay	12,746	1997 1998 1999
3	J'Mar Smith	9,523	2016 2017 2018 2019
4	Jason Martin	9,062	1993 1994 1995 1996
5	Matt Dunigan	7,042	1979 1980 1981 1982
6	Terry Bradshaw	6,589	1966 1967 1968 1969
7	Ryan Higgins	6,539	2013 2014 2015 2016
8	Colby Cameron	6,417	2009 2010 2011 2012
9	Gene Johnson	6,059	1988 1989 1990 1991
10	Ross Jenkins	5,036	2007 2008 2009 2010

Single season
Rk	Player	Yards	Year
1	Tim Rattay	4,943	1998
2	Ryan Higgins	4,617	2016
3	Colby Cameron	4,147	2012
4	Jeff Driskel	4,033	2015
5	Tim Rattay	3,922	1999
6	Tim Rattay	3,881	1997
7	Luke McCown	3,665	2001
8	Luke McCown	3,539	2002
9	Cody Sokol	3,436	2014
10	Jason Martin	3,360	1996

Single game
Rk	Player	Yards	Year	Opponent
1	Tim Rattay	590	1998	Nebraska
2	Tim Rattay	561	1999	UCF
3	Jason Martin	542	1996	Toledo
4	Tim Rattay	539	1998	Boise State
5	Tim Rattay	524	1998	UCF
6	Tim Rattay	510	1997	Central Michigan
7	Tim Rattay	508	1998	Arkansas State
	Tim Rattay	508	1999	Toledo
9	Ryan Higgins	504	2016	Middle Tennessee
10	Ryan Higgins	502	2016	Western Kentucky (C-USA Championship Game)

=== Passing touchdowns ===
Career
Rk	Player	TDs	Years
1	Tim Rattay	115	1997 1998 1999
2	Luke McCown	88	2000 2001 2002 2003
3	Jason Martin	64	1993 1994 1995 1996
4	J'Mar Smith	51	2016 2017 2018 2019
5	Ryan Higgins	48	2013 2014 2015 2016
6	Colby Cameron	45	2009 2010 2011 2012
7	Matt Dunigan	40	1979 1980 1981 1982
8	Gene Johnson	39	1988 1989 1990 1991
	Terry Bradshaw	39	1966 1967 1968 1969
10	Ross Jenkins	36	2007 2008 2009 2010

Single season
Rk	Player	TDs	Year
1	Tim Rattay	46	1998
2	Ryan Higgins	41	2016
3	Tim Rattay	35	1999
4	Tim Rattay	34	1997
5	Jason Martin	32	1996
6	Colby Cameron	31	2012
7	Cody Sokol	30	2014
8	Luke McCown	29	2001
9	Jeff Driskel	27	2015
10	Jason Martin	24	1995

Single game
Rk	Player	TDs	Year	Opponent
1	Jason Martin	8	1996	Toledo
2	Tim Rattay	7	1998	Boise State
	Tim Rattay	7	1998	Arkansas State
4	Jason Martin	6	1995	Northern Illinois
	Tim Rattay	6	1997	Central Michigan
	Tim Rattay	6	1998	Nicholls State
	Tim Rattay	6	1999	Louisiana-Monroe
	Luke McCown	6	2000	Louisiana-Lafayette

== Rushing ==
=== Rushing yards ===
Career
Rk	Player	Yards	Years
1	Kenneth Dixon	4,480	2012 2013 2014 2015
2	Daniel Porter	3,352	2006 2007 2008 2009
3	Jason Cooper	3,342	1991 1992 1993 1994
4	Ryan Moats	3,112	2002 2003 2004
5	John Henry White	2,944	1974 1975 1976 1977
6	Jason Davis	2,888	1989 1990 1991 1992
7	Patrick Jackson	2,824	2005 2006 2007 2008
8	Charles McDaniel	2,754	1971 1972 1973 1974
9	Garlon Powell	2,578	1984 1985 1986 1987
10	Derrick Douglas	2,434	1986 1987 1988 1989

Single season
Rk	Player	Yards	Year
1	Ryan Moats	1,774	2004
2	Jason Davis	1,351	1991
3	Ryan Moats	1,300	2003
4	Kenneth Dixon	1,299	2014
5	Derrick Douglas	1,232	1989
6	Joe Smith	1,216	2002
7	Kenneth Dixon	1,194	2012
8	Jason Cooper	1,189	1994
9	Lennon Creer	1,181	2010
10	Daniel Porter	1,164	2008

Single game
Rk	Player	Yards	Year	Opponent
1	Jason Davis	302	1990	Louisiana-Lafayette
2	Ryan Moats	267	2003	Hawaii
3	Bobby Ray Tell	264	1999	Louisiana-Lafayette
4	Ryan Moats	257	2004	Nevada
4	Ryan Moats	257	2004	Louisiana-Lafayette
6	Jason Cooper	255	1994	San Jose State
7	Lennon Creer	252	2010	San Jose State
8	Ryan Moats	236	2004	Fresno State
9	Kenneth Dixon	232	2012	Idaho
10	Ryan Moats	228	2004	Hawaii

=== Rushing touchdowns ===
Career
Rk	Player	TDs	Years
1	Kenneth Dixon	71	2012 2013 2014 2015
2	Charles McDaniel	52	1971 1972 1973 1974
3	Arry Moody	36	1973 1974 1975 1976
4	Patrick Jackson	29	2005 2006 2007 2008
5	Buster Herren	28	1966 1967 1968 1969
5	Ryan Moats	28	2002 2003 2004
5	Daniel Porter	28	2006 2007 2008 2009
8	Jason Davis	27	1989 1990 1991 1992
9	Joe Smith	24	2001 2002
10	A. L. Williams	23	1953 1954 1955 1956
	Paul Hynes	23	1957 1958 1959 1960

Single season
Rk	Player	TDs	Year
1	Kenneth Dixon	27	2012
2	Kenneth Dixon	22	2014
3	Kenneth Dixon	19	2015
4	Ryan Moats	18	2004
5	Arry Moody	17	1976
6	Joe Smith	16	2002
7	Charles McDaniel	15	1974
	Justin Henderson	15	2019
9	Charles McDaniel	14	1971
	Jason Davis	14	1991

Single game
Rk	Player	TDs	Year	Opponent
1	Kenneth Dixon	6	2012	Idaho
	Kenneth Dixon	6	2015	North Texas
3	Arry Moody	5	1976	Louisiana-Monroe
4	Shane Benoit	4	1992	Eastern Michigan
	Joe Smith	4	2002	UTEP
	Ryan Moats	4	2004	Fresno State
	Kenneth Dixon	4	2012	UNLV
	Kenneth Dixon	4	2012	Texas State
	Marcus Williams Jr.	4	2021	Charlotte

== Receiving ==
=== Receptions ===
Career
Rk	Player	Rec	Years
1	Trent Taylor	327	2013 2014 2015 2016
2	Smoke Harris	308	2018 2019 2020 2021 2022 2023
3	Troy Edwards	280	1996 1997 1998
4	Chad Mackey	262	1993 1994 1995 1996
5	John Simon	261	1998 1999 2000 2001
6	James Jordan	246	1998 1999 2000
7	Delwyn Daigre	234	1998 1999 2000 2001
8	Bobby Slaughter	198	1987 1988 1989 1990
9	Quinton Patton	183	2011 2012
10	Tommy Spinks	182	1966 1967 1968 1969

Single season
Rk	Player	Rec	Year
1	Troy Edwards	140	1998
2	Trent Taylor	136	2016
3	James Jordan	109	2000
4	Quinton Patton	104	2012
5	Troy Edwards	102	1997
6	Trent Taylor	99	2015
7	Chad Mackey	90	1995
8	Chad Mackey	85	1996
	Tru Edwards	85	2024
10	Smoke Harris	83	2023

Single game
Rk	Player	Rec	Year	Opponent
1	Troy Edwards	21	1998	Nebraska
	Quinton Patton	21	2012	Texas A&M
3	Lifford Jackson	17	1988	Kansas State
	Chad Mackey	17	1995	Nevada
	Trent Taylor	17	2016	Middle Tennessee

=== Receiving yards ===
Career
Rk	Player	Yards	Years
1	Troy Edwards	4,352	1996 1997 1998
2	Trent Taylor	4,179	2013 2014 2015 2016
3	Chad Mackey	3,763	1993 1994 1995 1996
4	Delwyn Daigre	3,056	1998 1999 2000 2001
5	Tommy Spinks	2,963	1966 1967 1968 1969
6	Smoke Harris	2,908	2018 2019 2020 2021 2022 2023
7	Carlos Henderson	2,878	2014 2015 2016
8	Roger Carr	2,717	1970 1971 1972 1973
9	John Simon	2,596	1998 1999 2000 2001
10	Quinton Patton	2,594	2011 2012

Single season
Rk	Player	Yards	Year
1	Troy Edwards	1,996	1998
2	Trent Taylor	1,803	2016
3	Troy Edwards	1,707	1997
4	Carlos Henderson	1,535	2016
5	Chad Mackey	1,466	1996
6	Quinton Patton	1,392	2012
7	Billy Ryckman	1,382	1976
8	Trent Taylor	1,282	2015
9	Rod Foppe	1,274	1977
10	Chad Mackey	1,253	1995

Single game
Rk	Player	Yards	Year	Opponent
1	Troy Edwards	405	1998	Nebraska
2	Carlos Henderson	326	2016	Massachusetts
3	Chad Mackey	310	1996	Toledo
4	Chad Mackey	263	1995	Pacific
5	Lifford Jackson	251	1988	Kansas State
6	Troy Edwards	235	1998	Boise State
	Delwyn Daigre	235	1999	UAB
8	Quinton Patton	233	2012	Texas A&M
	Trent Taylor	233	2016	Navy (Armed Forces Bowl)
10	Tommy Spinks	232	1967	Southeastern Louisiana
	Chad Mackey	232	1995	Nevada
	Carlos Henderson	232	2016	Western Kentucky

=== Receiving touchdowns ===
Career
Rk	Player	TDs	Years
1	Troy Edwards	50	1996 1997 1998
2	Trent Taylor	32	2013 2014 2015 2016
3	Carlos Henderson	28	2014 2015 2016
4	Delwyn Daigre	25	1998 1999 2000 2001
5	Quinton Patton	24	2011 2012
6	Smoke Harris	23	2018 2019 2020 2021 2022 2023
7	Chad Mackey	22	1993 1994 1995 1996
8	Sean Cangelosi	21	1997 1998 1999 2000
9	Josh Bradley	20	1995 1996 1997
10	Roger Carr	19	1970 1971 1972 1973
	James Jordan	19	1998 1999 2000

Single season
Rk	Player	TDs	Year
1	Troy Edwards	27	1998
2	Carlos Henderson	19	2016
3	Troy Edwards	13	1997
	Quinton Patton	13	2012
5	Dennis Morris	12	2009
	Trent Taylor	12	2016
7	James Jordan	11	1999
	Quinton Patton	11	2011
9	Billy Ryckman	10	1976
	Troy Edwards	10	1996
	Chad Mackey	10	1996
	Sean Cangelosi	10	1999
	Tre Harris	10	2022

Single game
Rk	Player	TDs	Year	Opponent
1	Chad Mackey	5	1996	Toledo
	Troy Edwards	5	1998	Boise State
	Carlos Henderson	5	2016	Massachusetts
4	Troy Edwards	4	1998	Arkansas State
	Troy Edwards	4	1998	Louisiana-Lafayette
	Quinton Patton	4	2012	Texas A&M
	Carlos Henderson	4	2016	North Texas

== Total offense ==
Total offense is the sum of passing and rushing statistics. It does not include receiving or returns.

=== Total offense yards ===
Career
Rk	Player	Yards	Years
1	Luke McCown	12,731	2000 2001 2002 2003
2	Tim Rattay	12,643	1997 1998 1999
3	Jason Martin	8,938	1993 1994 1995 1996
4	J'Mar Smith	7,145	2016 2017 2018
5	Matt Dunigan	7,135	1979 1980 1981 1982
6	Ryan Higgins	6,879	2013 2014 2015 2016
7	Colby Cameron	6,839	2009 2010 2011 2012
8	Terry Bradshaw	6,664	1966 1967 1968 1969
9	Gene Johnson	5,990	1988 1989 1990 1991
10	Ross Jenkins	5,280	2007 2008 2009 2010

Single season
Rk	Player	Yards	Year
1	Ryan Higgins	4,894	2016
2	Tim Rattay	4,865	1998
3	Jeff Driskel	4,356	2015
4	Colby Cameron	4,324	2012
5	Tim Rattay	3,968	1997
6	Tim Rattay	3,810	1999
7	Luke McCown	3,569	2002
8	Cody Sokol	3,482	2014
9	Luke McCown	3,481	2001
10	J'Mar Smith	3,345	2017

Single game
Rk	Player	Yards	Year	Opponent
1	Tim Rattay	568	1998	Nebraska
2	Tim Rattay	541	1999	UCF
3	Tim Rattay	538	1998	Boise State
4	Jason Martin	529	1996	Toledo
5	Ryan Higgins	518	2016	Middle Tennessee
6	Tim Rattay	515	1999	Toledo
7	Tim Rattay	514	1997	Central Michigan
8	Ken Lantrip	492	1970	Louisiana-Monroe
9	Tim Rattay	483	1998	Arkansas State
10	Tim Rattay	482	1998	UCF

=== Total touchdowns ===
Louisiana Tech's 2018 media guide lists this category as "touchdowns responsible for", and includes only quarterbacks. This list, in keeping with all other Wikipedia lists of college football statistical leaders by team, also includes non-quarterbacks. This statistic includes only passing and rushing touchdowns—not receiving or return touchdowns.

Career
Rk	Player	TDs	Years
1	Tim Rattay	117	1997 1998 1999
2	Luke McCown	97	2000 2001 2002 2003
3	Kenneth Dixon	71	2012 2013 2014 2015
4	Jason Martin	67	1993 1994 1995 1996
5	Terry Bradshaw	56	1966 1967 1968 1969
6	Ryan Higgins	55	2013 2014 2015 2016
7	Charles McDaniel	52	1971 1972 1973 1974
8	Colby Cameron	50	2009 2010 2011 2012
9	Matt Dunigan	49	1979 1980 1981 1982
10	J'Mar Smith	44	2016 2017 2018

Single season
Rk	Player	TDs	Year
1	Tim Rattay	46	1998
2	Ryan Higgins	45	2016
3	Tim Rattay	36	1999
4	Tim Rattay	35	1997
	Colby Cameron	35	2012
6	Jason Martin	32	1996
	Luke McCown	32	2001
	Cody Sokol	32	2014
	Jeff Driskel	32	2015
10	Terry Bradshaw	27	1968

Single game
Rk	Player	TDs	Year	Opponent
1	Jason Martin	8	1996	Toledo
2	Tim Rattay	7	1998	Boise State
	Tim Rattay	7	1998	Arkansas State

== Defense ==
=== Interceptions ===
Career
Rk	Player	Ints	Years
1	Doyle Adams	16	1982 1983 1984 1985
2	John Causey	15	1971 1972 1973
	Wenford Wilborn	15	1971 1972 1973 1974
	Larry Griffin	15	1971 1972 1973 1974
5	Xavier Woods	14	2013 2014 2015 2016
	Amik Robertson	14	2017 2018 2019
7	Willie Smith	13	1994 1995
8	Demise Loyd	11	1988 1989 1990 1991
	John Noel	11	1996 1997

Single season
Rk	Player	Ints	Year
1	John Causey	10	1972
2	Willie Smith	8	1995
	Jakari Foster	8	2025
4	John Noel	7	1997
5	Doyle Adams	6	1985
	Xavier Woods	6	2014

Single game
Rk	Player	Ints	Year	Opponent
1	Joseph Thigpen	4	1933	Northwestern State

=== Tackles ===
Career
Rk	Player	Tackles	Years
1	Glenell Sanders	548	1986 1987 1988 1989
2	Doug Landry	509	1982 1983 1984 1985
3	Joe McNeely	400	1970 1971 1972 1973
4	Eldonta Osborne	395	1986 1987 1988 1989
5	Bobby Gray	393	1998 1999 2000 2001
6	Fred Dean	392	1971 1972 1973 1974
7	Myron Baker	379	1989 1990 1991 1992
8	Lance Reed	357	1992 1993 1994 1995
9	Antonio Baker	352	2006 2007 2008 2009
10	Johnny Robinson	340	1977 1978 1979 1980

Single season
Rk	Player	Tackles	Year
1	Glenell Sanders	183	1988
1	Glenell Sanders	183	1987
3	Doug Landry	178	1983
4	Joe McNeely	150	1973
5	Myron Smith	148	1997
6	Joe McNeely	144	1972
7	Johnny Robinson	138	1979
8	Doug Landry	135	1984
9	Myron Baker	132	1992
10	Jon Paul Laque	131	1983

Single game
Rk	Player	Tackles	Year	Opponent
1	Doug Landry	24	1983	Arkansas State
	Glenell Sanders	24	1987	Arkansas State
3	Ronnie Alexander	23	1970	Southeastern Louisiana
	Doug Landry	23	1983	UL-Lafayette
	Doug Landry	23	1985	Arkansas State
	John Noel	23	1996	Central Michigan
7	Glenell Sanders	22	1988	Arkansas State
8	Danny Majors	21	1975	Southern Miss
	Doug Landry	21	1983	North Texas

=== Sacks ===
Career
Rk	Player	Sacks	Years
1	Jaylon Ferguson	45.0	2015 2016 2017 2018
2	Walter Johnson	38.0	1983 1984 1985 1986
3	Matt Broha	22.0	2008 2009 2010 2011
4	IK Enemkpali	17.5	2010 2011 2012 2013
5	Johnny Robinson	16.0	1977 1978 1979 1980
6	Christian Lacey	14.5	2008 2009 2010 2011
7	Mike Wood	14.0	1986 1987 1988 1989
8	Courtney Wallace	13.5	1985 1986 1987 1988
	Vontarrius Dora	13.5	2012 2013 2014 2015
10	Lorenza Baker	13.0	1988 1989 1990 1991

Single season
Rk	Player	Sacks	Year
1	Jaylon Ferguson	17.5	2018
2	Jaylon Ferguson	14.5	2016
3	Walter Johnson	14.0	1986
4	Johnny Robinson	13.0	1979
5	Alonzo Jackson Jr.	11.0	2026
6	Walter Johnson	10.5	1984
7	Mike Sorenson	10.0	1982
	Houston Bates	10.0	2014
9	Matt Broha	9.0	2010
10	Christian Lacey	8.5	2011

Single game
Rk	Player	Sacks	Year	Opponent
1	Houston Bates	4.5	2014	Illinois (Heart of Dallas Bowl)
2	Johnny Robinson	4.0	1978	Texas-Arlington
	Jaylon Ferguson	4.0	2018	North Texas
4	Jaylon Ferguson	3.5	2018	UTEP
5	9 times by 8 players	3.0	Most recent: Alonzo Jackson Jr. vs. LSU, 2026	

== Kicking ==
=== Field goals made ===
Career
Rk	Player	FGs	Years
1	Jonathan Barnes	81	2014 2015 2016 2017
2	Josh Scobee	65	2000 2001 2002 2003
3	Matt Stover	64	1986 1987 1988 1989
4	Jacob Barnes	54	2020 2021 2022 2023
5	Matt Nelson	53	2009 2010 2011 2012
6	Chris Boniol	50	1990 1991 1992 1993
	Marty Kent	50	1994 1995 1996 1997
8	Danny Horwedel	46	2004 2005 2006 2007
9	George Benyola	40	1984 1985
10	Jerry Pope	31	1973 1974 1975 1976
	Robert Dager	31	1980 1981 1982 1983

Single season
Rk	Player	FGs	Year
1	Jonathan Barnes	25	2017
2	George Benyola	24	1985
3	Jonathan Barnes	22	2015
	Jonathan Barnes	22	2016
5	Matt Stover	21	1986
	Josh Scobee	21	2003
7	Josh Scobee	18	2001
	Danny Horwedel	18	2005
	Kyle Fischer	18	2013
10	Chris Boniol	17	1990
	Marty Kent	17	1994
	Jacob Barnes	17	2021

Single game
Rk	Player	FGs	Year	Opponent
1	Kyle Fischer	5	2013	FIU
	Bailey Hale	5	2018	North Texas
3	George Benyola	4	1985	North Texas
	George Benyola	4	1985	Northwestern State
	Matt Stover	4	1985	McNeese State
	Matt Stover	4	1989	UL-Lafayette
	Chris Boniol	4	1990	Arkansas State
	Danny Horwedel	4	2005	North Texas
	Jonathan Barnes	4	2015	Kansas State
	Jonathan Barnes	4	2015	Arkansas State (New Orleans Bowl)
	Jacob Barnes	4	2020	UTSA
	Jacob Barnes	4	2021	Southern Miss
	Jacob Barnes	4	2022	Middle Tennessee
	Buck Buchanan	4	2024	Western Kentucky

=== Field goal percentage ===
While past Louisiana Tech media guides (as recently as 2015) have included this statistic, the 2018 media guide does not provide any list of leaders in kicking accuracy for either field goals or extra points.

Career
Rk	Player	FG%	Years
1	Jacob Barnes	79.4%	2020 2021 2022 2023
2	Jonathan Barnes	78.6%	2014 2015 2016 2017
3	Kyle Fischer	78.3%	2013 2014 2015
4	Marty Kent	78.1%	1994 1995 1996 1997
5	Bailey Hale	75.0%	2018 2019
6	Matt Stover	72.7%	1986 1987 1988 1989
7	Matt Nelson	72.6%	2009 2010 2011 2012
8	Josh Scobee	71.4%	2000 2001 2002 2003

Single season
Rk	Player	FG%	Year
1	Marty Kent	92.9%	1996
2	Marty Kent	85.7%	1995
	Jacob Barnes	85.7%	2020
4	Jonathan Barnes	84.6%	2015
5	Matt Stover	84.0%	1986
