= List of Louisiana Tech Bulldogs in the NFL draft =

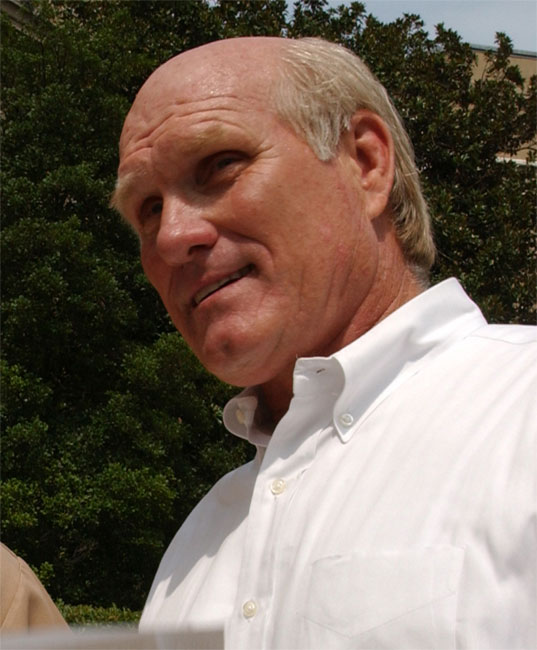
Terry Bradshaw was the 1st overall pick by the Pittsburgh Steelers in the 1970 NFL draft.

The Louisiana Tech Bulldogs football program has had 76 players drafted into the National Football League (NFL) since the league began holding drafts in 1936. (Note: Because of the NFL–AFL merger agreement, the history of the AFL is officially recognized by the NFL and therefore this list includes the AFL draft (1960–1966) and the common draft (1967–1969).) This includes five players taken in the first round and one overall number one pick, Terry Bradshaw in 1970. Louisiana Tech had one player selected in the most recent NFL draft.

Each NFL franchise seeks to add new players through the annual NFL draft. The draft rules were last updated in 2009. The team with the worst record the previous year picks first, the next-worst team second, and so on. Teams that did not make the playoffs are ordered by their regular-season record with any remaining ties broken by strength of schedule. Playoff participants are sequenced after non-playoff teams, based on their round of elimination (wild card, division, conference, and Super Bowl).

Before the merger agreements in 1966, the American Football League (AFL) operated in direct competition with the NFL and held a separate draft. This led to a massive bidding war over top prospects between the two leagues. As part of the merger agreement on June 8, 1966, the two leagues would hold a multiple round "common draft". Once the AFL officially merged with the NFL in 1970, the common draft simply became the NFL draft.

== Key ==
B	Back	K	Kicker	NT	Nose tackle
C	Center	LB	Linebacker	FB	Fullback
DB	Defensive back	P	Punter	HB	Halfback
DE	Defensive end	QB	Quarterback	WR	Wide receiver
DT	Defensive tackle	RB	Running back	G	Guard
E	End	T	Offensive tackle	TE	Tight end

*	Selected to a Pro Bowl
†	Won an NFL championship
‡	Selected to a Pro Bowl and won an NFL championship

== Selections ==
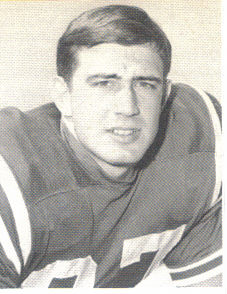
Larry Brewer was the 194th overall pick by the Atlanta Falcons in the 1970 NFL draft.

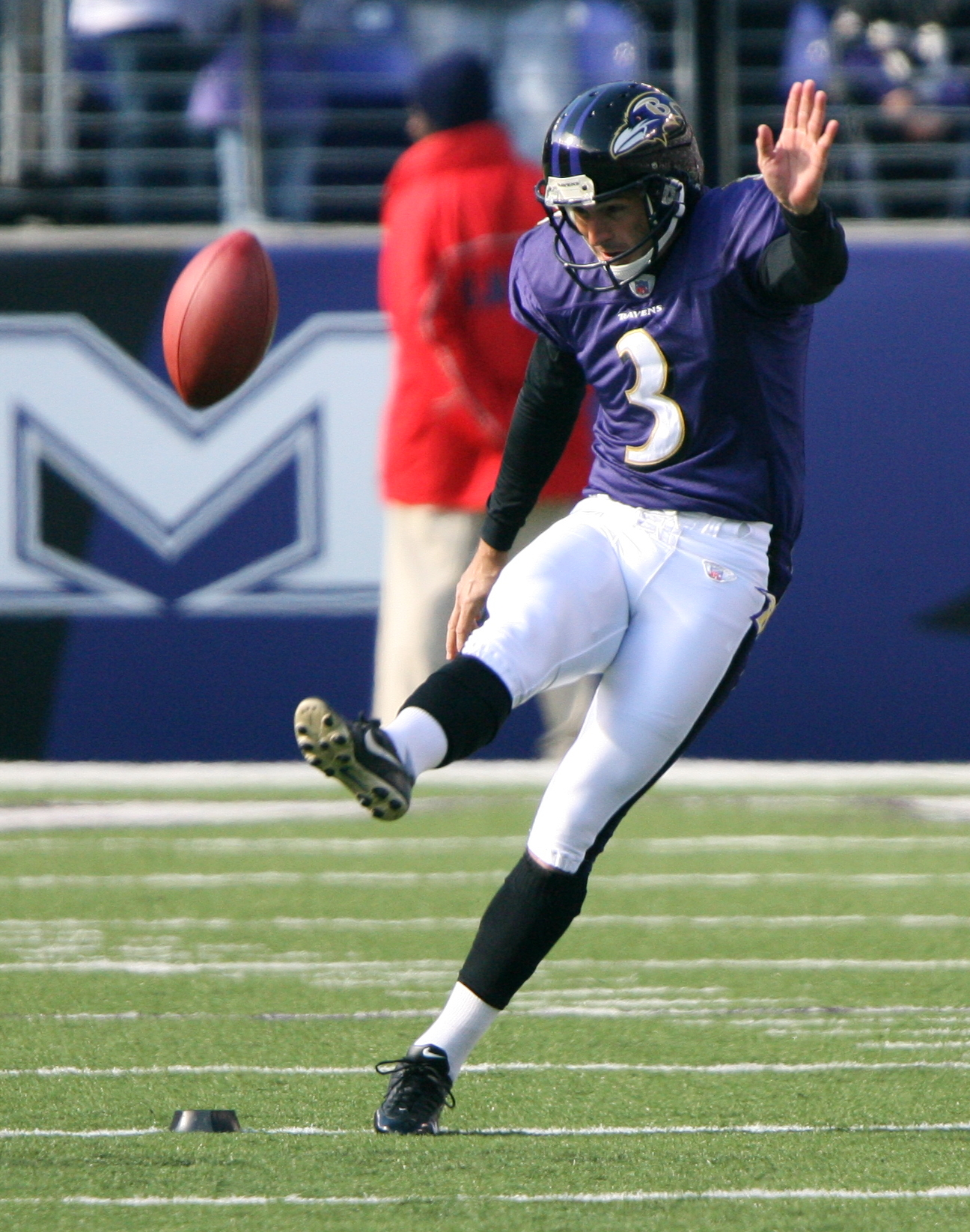
Matt Stover was the 329th overall pick by the New York Giants in the 1990 NFL draft.

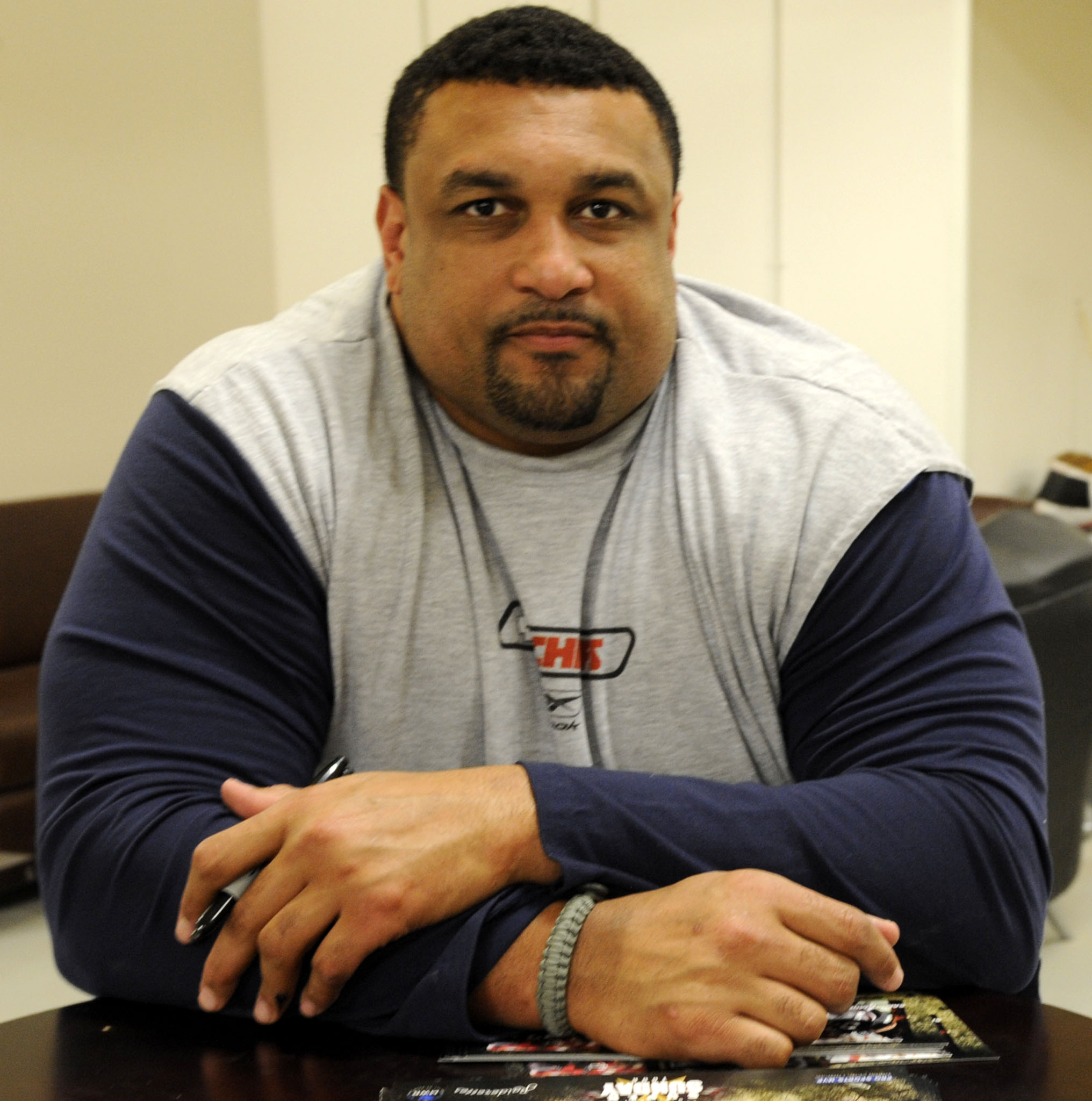
Willie Roaf was the 8th overall pick by the New Orleans Saints in the 1993 NFL draft.

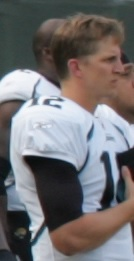
Luke McCown was the 106th overall pick by the Cleveland Browns in the 2004 NFL draft.

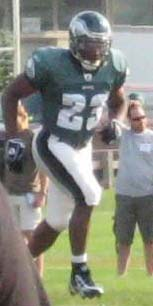
Ryan Moats was the 77th overall pick by the Philadelphia Eagles in the 2005 NFL draft.

Year (Note: From 1960 through 1966, teams with a superscript AFL denotes player drafted in the AFL draft and teams with a superscript NFL denotes a player drafted in the NFL draft.)	Round	Pick	Overall	Player	Team (Note: This is the team that drafted the player, not their most recent team.)	Position	Notes
1944	20	2	199	George Doherty	Brooklyn Tigers	T	—
1948	17	3	148	Chuck Newman	Washington Redskins	E	—
1951	8	4	90	Leo Sanford^{‡}	Chicago Cardinals	LB	NFL Champion (1958); Pro Bowl (1956, 1957)
1954	19	5	222	Jim Lum	Chicago Bears	T	—
1955	14	1	158	Gordy Brown	Chicago Cardinals	E	—
1956	15	4	173	Charles Anderson	Chicago Cardinals	E	—
1957	15	3	172	Pat Hinton	Green Bay Packers	G	—
1958	12	2	135	Tom Hinton	Chicago Cardinals	G	—
1960	17	3	195	Bob Hudson	Detroit Lions^{NFL}	E	—
1961	10	10	136	Paul Hynes	San Francisco 49ers^{NFL}	DB	—
1964	8	8	106	J. R. Williamson	Baltimore Colts^{NFL}	LB	—
1966	13	14	199	Jim Boudreaux	Cleveland Browns^{NFL}	T	—
1967	10	22	259	Tom Croft	Buffalo Bills	DB	—
1968	7	11	176	Bob Brunet	Washington Redskins	RB	—
1968	10	17	263	Joe Raymond Peace	Houston Oilers	LB	—
1969	15	4	368	Ken Liberto	Pittsburgh Steelers	WR	—
1970	1	1	1	Terry Bradshaw^{‡}	Pittsburgh Steelers	QB	Super Bowl Champion (IX, X, XIII, XIV); Pro Bowl (1975, 1978, 1979)
1970	8	12	194	Larry Brewer	Atlanta Falcons	TE	—
1970	14	25	363	Tommy Spinks	Minnesota Vikings	WR	—
1974	1	24	24	Roger Carr*	Baltimore Colts	WR	Pro Bowl (1976)
1975	2	7	33	Fred Dean^{‡}	San Diego Chargers	DE	Super Bowl Champion (XVI, XIX); Pro Bowl (1979, 1980, 1981, 1983)
1975	13	4	316	Charles McDaniel	Chicago Bears	RB	—
1975	17	4	440	Roland Harper	Chicago Bears	RB	—
1976	2	20	48	Mike Barber	Houston Oilers	TE	—
1976	4	22	114	Pat Tilley*	St. Louis Cardinals	WR	Pro Bowl (1980)
1977	10	6	257	Billy Ryckman	Atlanta Falcons	WR	—
1978	4	17	101	Larry Anderson^{†}	Pittsburgh Steelers	DB	Super Bowl Champion (XIII, XIV)
1978	8	1	195	John Henry White	Kansas City Chiefs	RB	—
1981	4	28	111	Johnny Robinson^{†}	Oakland Raiders	DT	Super Bowl Champion (XVIII)
1982	5	12	123	Ed Jackson	Los Angeles Raiders	LB	—
1982	10	22	273	Andre Young	San Diego Chargers	DB	—
1983	4	9	93	Trey Junkin	Buffalo Bills	TE	—
1984	10	21	273	James Thaxton	Detroit Lions	DB	—
1986	5	8	118	Doug Landry	San Diego Chargers	LB	—
1987	2	18	46	Walter Johnson	Houston Oilers	LB	—
1990	6	4	141	Derrick Douglas	Tampa Bay Buccaneers	RB	—
1990	12	25	329	Matt Stover^{‡}	New York Giants	K	Super Bowl Champion (XXXV); Pro Bowl (2000)
1991	11	26	304	Bobby Slaughter	San Francisco 49ers	WR	—
1992	12	2	310	Eric Shaw	Cincinnati Bengals	LB	—
1993	1	8	8	Willie Roaf*	New Orleans Saints	T	Pro Bowl (1994, 1995, 1996, 1997, 1998, 1999, 2000, 2002, 2003, 2004, 2005)
1993	4	16	100	Myron Baker	Chicago Bears	LB	—
1993	5	4	116	Artie Smith	San Francisco 49ers	DT	—
1993	6	1	141	Doug Evans^{†}	Green Bay Packers	DB	Super Bowl Champion (XXXI)
1999	1	13	13	Troy Edwards	Pittsburgh Steelers	WR	—
2000	4	29	123	Joey Chustz	Jacksonville Jaguars	T	—
2000	7	6	212	Tim Rattay	San Francisco 49ers	QB	—
2002	5	5	140	Bobby Gray	Chicago Bears	DB	—
2004	4	10	106	Luke McCown	Cleveland Browns	QB	—
2004	5	5	137	Josh Scobee	Jacksonville Jaguars	K	—
2005	3	13	77	Ryan Moats	Philadelphia Eagles	RB	—
2007	7	44	254	Jonathan Holland	Oakland Raiders	WR	—
2010	3	10	74	D'Anthony Smith^{†}	Jacksonville Jaguars	DT	Super Bowl Champion (XLVIII)
2010	6	5	174	Dennis Morris	Washington Redskins	TE	—
2013	4	31	128	Quinton Patton	San Francisco 49ers	WR	—
2013	5	30	163	Jordan Mills	Chicago Bears	T	—
2014	4	7	107	Justin Ellis	Oakland Raiders	DT	—
2014	6	34	210	IK Enemkpali	New York Jets	LB	—
2016	1	30	30	Vernon Butler	Carolina Panthers	DT	—
2016	4	36	134	Kenneth Dixon	Baltimore Ravens	RB	—
2016	6	32	207	Jeff Driskel	San Francisco 49ers	QB	—
2017	3	18	82	Carlos Henderson	Denver Broncos	WR	—
2017	5	33	177	Trent Taylor	San Francisco 49ers	WR	—
2017	6	7	191	Xavier Woods	Dallas Cowboys	DB	—
2018	6	27	201	Boston Scott	New Orleans Saints	RB	—
2019	3	21	85	Jaylon Ferguson	Baltimore Ravens	DE	—
2020	4	32	138	L'Jarius Sneed^{†}	Kansas City Chiefs	DB	Super Bowl Champion (Super Bowl LVII)
2020	4	33	139	Amik Robertson	Las Vegas Raiders	DB	—
2021	3	9	73	Milton Williams	Philadelphia Eagles	DT	—
