= 2007 San Jose State Spartans football team =

American college football season

2007 San Jose State Spartans football
- Conference: Western Athletic Conference
- Record: 5–7 (4–4 WAC)
- Head coach: Dick Tomey (3rd season)
- Co-offensive coordinators: Marcus Arroyo (1st season); Steve Morton (1st season)
- Offensive scheme: Pro-style
- Defensive coordinator: Dave Fipp (3rd season)
- Base defense: 4–3
- Home stadium: Spartan Stadium

2007 Western Athletic Conference football standings
	Conf.			Overall
Team	W		L	W		L
No. 19 Hawaii $	8	–	0	12	–	1
Boise State	7	–	1	10	–	3
Fresno State	6	–	2	9	–	4
Nevada	4	–	4	6	–	7
Louisiana Tech	4	–	4	5	–	7
San Jose State	4	–	4	5	–	7
Utah State	2	–	6	2	–	10
New Mexico State	1	–	7	4	–	9
Idaho	0	–	8	1	–	11
$ – Conference champion and BCS representative as top non-AQ school to meet automatic qualification criteria; Rankings from AP Poll

The 2007 San Jose State Spartans football team represented San Jose State University in the 2007 NCAA Division I FBS football season. This season was the Spartans' third season with Dick Tomey as head coach.

== Preseason ==
At the end of the 2007 season, former assistant coach Marcus Arroyo, who was named co-offensive coordinator with Steve Morton in 2006, had to let Morton be in charge of the offense in cooperation.

In addition, at the end of the 2006 season, the Spartans had lost 17 lettermen, 9 from offense, and 8 from defense San Jose State wide receivers James Jones and John Broussard entered the 2007 NFL draft at the end of the 2006 season. James Jones was picked early in the third round for the Green Bay Packers, and Broussard was picked in the seventh round for the Jacksonville Jaguars.

The Spartans opened spring drills in early March and the annual spring game took place on mid-April.

== Schedule ==
Date	Time	Opponent	Site	TV	Result	Attendance
September 1	7:00 pm	at Arizona State*	Sun Devil Stadium; Tempe, AZ		L 3–45	54,405
September 8	4:05 pm	at Kansas State*	Bill Snyder Family Football Stadium; Manhattan, KS		L 14–34	45,545
September 15	7:00 pm	at Stanford*	Stanford Stadium; Stanford, CA (Bill Walsh Legacy Game)	FSNBA	L 0–37	36,144
September 22	5:00 pm	at Utah State	Romney Stadium; Logan, UT	ESPN+	W 23–20	13,685
September 29	1:00 pm	UC Davis*	Spartan Stadium; San Jose, CA	FSNBA	W 34–14	17,431
October 6	1:00 pm	Idaho	Spartan Stadium; San Jose, CA		W 28–20	16,289
October 12	5:00 pm	No. 16 Hawaii	Spartan Stadium; San Jose, CA (Dick Tomey Legacy Game)	ESPN	L 35–42 ^{OT}	20,473
October 20	2:00 pm	at Fresno State	Bulldog Stadium; Fresno, CA (rivalry)	KFRE	L 0–30	35,494
November 3	12:00 pm	at No. 21 Boise State	Bronco Stadium; Boise, ID	KTVB	L 7–42	30,416
November 10	1:00 pm	New Mexico State	Spartan Stadium; San Jose, CA	ESPN+	W 51–17	10,452
November 17	4:00 pm	at Louisiana Tech	Joe Aillet Stadium; Ruston, LA		L 23–27	13,027
November 24	1:00 pm	Nevada	Spartan Stadium; San Jose, CA		W 27–24	12,678
*Non-conference game; Rankings from Coaches' Poll released prior to the game; All times are in Pacific time

== Game summaries ==
=== At Arizona State ===
	1	2	3	4	Total
Spartans	3	0	0	0	3
Sun Devils	10	21	7	7	45

=== At Kansas State ===
	1	2	3	4	Total
Spartans	0	7	0	7	14
Wildcats	10	7	0	17	34

=== At Stanford ===
	1	2	3	4	Total
Spartans	0	0	0	0	0
Cardinal	3	6	7	21	37

=== At Utah State ===
	1	2	3	4	Total
Spartans	6	10	0	7	23
Aggies	0	13	0	7	20

=== UC Davis ===
	1	2	3	4	Total
Aggies	7	0	0	7	14
Spartans	14	0	7	13	34

=== Idaho ===
	1	2	3	4	Total
Vandals	3	3	0	14	20
Spartans	7	14	0	7	28

=== No. 16 Hawaii ===
	1	2	3	4	Total
No. 16 Warriors	7	7	7	14	42
Spartans	0	7	21	7	35

The Spartans held Hawaii to their closest game on October 12, 2007. In the rain-drenched Spartan Stadium, the Warriors and the Spartans clashed in front of 20,437 fans. The Spartans got off to a rocky start, letting Hawaii 's Kealoha Pilares score on a 6-yard run. The Hawaii offense also took advantage of another scoring opportunity in the second quarter, with Ryan Grice-Mullins' 16-yard reception touchdown from Colt Brennan. The Spartans rebounded, with Dwight Lowery returning a Will Johnson kick for 84 yards. That ended the scoring for the first half at 7–14. The Spartans gained enormous momentum in the third quarter. First, by having Lowery once again score, on a 24-yard interception run. Soon thereafter, Kevin Jurovich took advantage of a 16-yard pass from Adam Tafralis. The duo would be effective again, by scoring on a 68-yard pass from Tafralis on a drive that would only take four plays. Hawaii got their only touchdown that quarter CJ Hawthorne's 34-yard reception touchdown from Brennan. The Spartans started strong in the fourth quarter, by scoring on an 8-yard run by James T. Callier. Hawaii took advantage and scored on a Davone Bess 11-yard run from Brennan. Brennan scored the last touchdown in the fourth quarter making the score 35–35, and leading the game into overtime. The Warriors scored the first touchdown by a 9-yard pass from Brennan to Jason Rivers, ending the heart-pounding game at a score of 42–35. For the second straight season, San Jose State had a crushing home loss to a BCS hopeful. The Spartans lost a late eight-point lead against Boise State last year before falling 23–20 on a last-second field goal. "It was disappointing to lose to Boise State and this was even more disappointing," coach Dick Tomey said. But Tomey reassured the positives of the loss, "We played our butts off and that's good for us." Tafralis finished 27-for-47 for 302 yards and three interceptions. Jurovich had seven catches for 117 yards.

=== At Fresno State ===
	1	2	3	4	Total
Spartans	0	0	0	0	0
Bulldogs	3	3	21	3	30

=== At No. 21 Boise State ===
	1	2	3	4	Total
Spartans	0	7	0	0	7
No. 21 Broncos	0	21	14	7	42

=== New Mexico State ===
	1	2	3	4	Total
Aggies	3	7	0	7	17
Spartans	10	20	7	14	51

=== At Louisiana Tech ===
	1	2	3	4	Total
Spartans	6	0	17	0	23
Bulldogs	21	3	0	3	27

=== Nevada ===
	1	2	3	4	Total
Wolf Pack	7	17	0	0	24
Spartans	7	3	7	10	27

== Personnel ==
=== Coaching staff ===
Name	Position	Seasons at San Jose State	Alma mater
Dick Tomey	Head coach	3rd	DePauw (1961)
Keith Burns	Associate head coach/cornerbacks coach/special teams coordinator	4th	Arkansas (1982)
Brent Brennan	Tight ends and recruiting coordinator	3rd	UCLA (1996)
Ken Margerum	Wide receivers	3rd	Stanford (1981)
Gary Emanuel	Defensive line	1st	Plymouth State (1982)
Dave Fipp	Defensive coordinator	3rd	Arizona (1997)
Steve Morton	Co-offensive coordinator/offensive line	3rd	Washington State (1977)
Jeff Hammerschmidt	Linebackers	1st	Arizona (1991)
Charles Nash	Running backs	7th	Arizona (1977)
Kinji Green	Graduate/football operations assistant	2nd	San Jose State (2005)
Jeff Gordon	Graduate assistant	2nd	San Jose State (2005)

=== Depth chart ===
Defensive starters

FS
Andrew Ryan
Dimitrious Chattman

CB
Chris Owens
Devin Newsome

WLB	MLB	SLB
Ryno Gonzales	Demetrious Jones	Matt Castelo
Chris Reese	Braden Stoaraasli	Travis Jones
	Brian Elledge	Jason Swisher

DE	DT	DT	DE
Carl Ihenacho	Jerome Pulu	Adonis Davis	Jarron Gilbert
David Lomu	Kalvin Cressel	Justin Willis	Justin Cole

SS
Dominique Hunsucker
Pompey Festejo

CB
Dwight Lowery
David Bowen

Offensive starters

WR
Michael Hooper
Jacob French

LT	LG	C	RG	RT
Jibri Sharp	Ronnie Castillo	Justin Paysinger	John Booker	Bradis Mcgriff
Brian Ybarra	Isaac Leatiota	Ryan Simone	David Giesen	Joseph Zusin

TE
Jeff Clark
Julian Harris

WR
Jalal Beauchman
Kevin Jurovich

QB
Adam Tafralis
Sean Flynn

FB
James T. Callier
Mohamed Marah

RB
Yonus Davis
Patrick Perry
Cameron Island

Special teams
P and PK Waylon Prather Jared Strubeck	LS Grant Izokovic
