= 2007 Louisiana Tech Bulldogs football team =

American college football season

2007 Louisiana Tech Bulldogs football
- Conference: Western Athletic Conference
- Record: 5–7 (4–4 WAC)
- Head coach: Derek Dooley (1st season)
- Offensive coordinator: Frank Scelfo (1st season)
- Offensive scheme: Multiple pro-style
- Defensive coordinator: Tommy Spangler (1st season)
- Base defense: 4–3
- Captains: Quin Harris; Patrick Jackson; Tyler Miller; Josh Muse
- Home stadium: Joe Aillet Stadium

2007 Western Athletic Conference football standings
| | Conf. | | | Overall |
| Team | W | | L | W | | L |
|---|---|---|---|---|---|---|
| No. 19 Hawaii $ | 8 | – | 0 | 12 | – | 1 |
| Boise State | 7 | – | 1 | 10 | – | 3 |
| Fresno State | 6 | – | 2 | 9 | – | 4 |
| Nevada | 4 | – | 4 | 6 | – | 7 |
| Louisiana Tech | 4 | – | 4 | 5 | – | 7 |
| San Jose State | 4 | – | 4 | 5 | – | 7 |
| Utah State | 2 | – | 6 | 2 | – | 10 |
| New Mexico State | 1 | – | 7 | 4 | – | 9 |
| Idaho | 0 | – | 8 | 1 | – | 11 |
$ – Conference champion and BCS representative as top non-AQ school to meet automatic qualification criteria; Rankings from AP Poll

The 2007 Louisiana Tech Bulldogs football team represented Louisiana Tech University as a member of the Western Athletic Conference (WAC) during the 2007 NCAA Division I FBS football season. Led by first-year head coach Derek Dooley, the Bulldogs played their home games at Joe Aillet Stadium in Ruston, Louisiana. Dooley succeeded Jack Bicknell, Jr., who was fired after a 3–10 season in 2006. Louisiana Tech finished the season with a record of 5–7 overall and a mark of 4–4 in conference play, tying for fourth place in the WAC.

== Before the season ==
=== T-Day spring game ===
| | 1 | 2 | 3 | 4 | Total |
|---|---|---|---|---|---|
| White | 7 | 0 | | | 7 |
| Blue | 7 | 3 | | | 10 |

== Schedule ==
| Date | Time | Opponent | Site | TV | Result | Attendance |
|---|---|---|---|---|---|---|
| September 1 | 6:00 p.m. | Central Arkansas* | Joe Aillet Stadium; Ruston, LA | | W 28–7 | 20,240 |
| September 8 | 6:00 p.m. | No. 20 Hawaii | Joe Aillet Stadium; Ruston, LA | ESPN Plus, Oceanic PPV | L 44–45 ^{OT} | 22,135 |
| September 15 | 5:30 p.m. | at No. 8 California* | California Memorial Stadium; Berkeley, CA | CSN | L 12–42 | 58,057 |
| September 29 | 9:00 p.m. | at Fresno State | Bulldog Stadium; Fresno, CA | | L 6–17 | 38,104 |
| October 6 | 1:00 p.m. | at Ole Miss* | Vaught–Hemingway Stadium; Oxford, MS | | L 0–24 | 45,138 |
| October 13 | 6:00 p.m. | New Mexico State^{†} | Joe Aillet Stadium; Ruston, LA | ESPN Plus | W 22-21 | 18,211 |
| October 20 | 6:00 p.m. | Boise State | Joe Aillet Stadium; Ruston, LA | KTVB | L 31–45 | 19,199 |
| October 27 | 2:00 p.m. | at Utah State | Romney Stadium; Logan, UT | | W 31–21 | 8,543 |
| November 3 | 4:00 p.m. | at Idaho | Kibbie Dome; Moscow, ID | | W 28–16 | 10,479 |
| November 10 | 7:00 p.m. | at No. 2 LSU* | Tiger Stadium; Baton Rouge, LA | PPV | L 10–58 | 92,512 |
| November 17 | 6:00 p.m. | San Jose State | Joe Aillet Stadium; Ruston, LA | | W 27–23 | 13,027 |
| December 1 | 3:05 p.m. | at Nevada | Mackay Stadium; Reno, NV | | L 10–49 | 9,113 |
*Non-conference game; ^{†}Homecoming; Rankings from AP Poll released prior to the game; All times are in Central time

== Coaching staff ==
| Position | Name | Year at Tech | Alma mater |
|---|---|---|---|
| Head Football Coach | Derek Dooley | 1st | Virginia '90 |
| Offensive coordinator / quarterbacks | Frank Scelfo | 1st | Louisiana-Monroe '81 |
| Defensive coordinator | Tommy Spangler | 1st | Georgia '84 |
| Defensive line / Character Education Coordinator | Ed Jackson | 15th | Louisiana Tech '83 |
| Linebackers | Kenny Evans | 1st | Northeastern State '82 |
| Defensive Backs / Recruiting Coordinator | Terry Joseph | 1st | Northwestern State '96 |
| Running backs | Brent Indest | 1st | Louisiana-Monroe '90 |
| Wide receivers | Conroy Hines | 14th | Louisiana Tech '89 |
| offensive line | Petey Perot | 19th | Northwestern State '83 |
| Special Teams / Tight ends | Eric Russell | 1st | Idaho '91 |
| Head Strength and Conditioning Coach | Damon Harrington | 5th | Louisiana Tech '00 |
| Assistant Strength and Conditioning Coach | Quarvay Winbush | 1st | Louisiana Tech '06 |
| Strength and Conditioning Intern | Aaron Lips | 1st | Louisiana Tech '05 |
| Strength and Conditioning Intern | Chino Fontenette | 1st | Tulane '03 |
| Graduate Assistant (Defense) | Russell Rothan | 1st | Presbyterian '02 |

== Game summaries ==
=== Central Arkansas ===
| | 1 | 2 | 3 | 4 | Total |
|---|---|---|---|---|---|
| UCA | 7 | 0 | 0 | 0 | 7 |
| LA Tech | 7 | 14 | 7 | 0 | 28 |

=== Hawaii ===
| | 1 | 2 | 3 | 4 | OT | Total |
|---|---|---|---|---|---|---|
| Hawaii | 7 | 7 | 14 | 10 | 7 | 45 |
| LA Tech | 14 | 7 | 10 | 7 | 6 | 44 |

=== California ===
| | 1 | 2 | 3 | 4 | Total |
|---|---|---|---|---|---|
| LA Tech | 0 | 6 | 6 | 0 | 12 |
| Cal | 7 | 21 | 7 | 7 | 42 |

=== Fresno State ===
| | 1 | 2 | 3 | 4 | Total |
|---|---|---|---|---|---|
| LA Tech | 3 | 3 | 0 | 0 | 6 |
| Fresno St. | 0 | 0 | 10 | 7 | 17 |

=== Ole Miss ===
| | 1 | 2 | 3 | 4 | Total |
|---|---|---|---|---|---|
| LA Tech | 0 | 0 | 0 | 0 | 0 |
| Ole Miss | 7 | 3 | 7 | 7 | 24 |

=== New Mexico State ===
| | 1 | 2 | 3 | 4 | Total |
|---|---|---|---|---|---|
| NM State | 7 | 0 | 7 | 7 | 21 |
| LA Tech | 0 | 3 | 6 | 13 | 22 |

=== Boise State ===
| | 1 | 2 | 3 | 4 | Total |
|---|---|---|---|---|---|
| Boise St. | 14 | 3 | 14 | 14 | 45 |
| LA Tech | 7 | 10 | 7 | 7 | 31 |

=== Utah State ===
| | 1 | 2 | 3 | 4 | Total |
|---|---|---|---|---|---|
| LA Tech | 10 | 0 | 14 | 7 | 31 |
| Utah St. | 0 | 7 | 0 | 14 | 21 |

=== Idaho ===
| | 1 | 2 | 3 | 4 | Total |
|---|---|---|---|---|---|
| LA Tech | 7 | 7 | 0 | 14 | 28 |
| Idaho | 3 | 7 | 6 | 0 | 16 |

=== LSU ===
| | 1 | 2 | 3 | 4 | Total |
|---|---|---|---|---|---|
| LA Tech | 0 | 7 | 0 | 3 | 10 |
| LSU | 10 | 17 | 17 | 14 | 58 |

=== San Jose State ===
| | 1 | 2 | 3 | 4 | Total |
|---|---|---|---|---|---|
| SJSU | 6 | 0 | 17 | 0 | 23 |
| LA Tech | 21 | 3 | 0 | 3 | 27 |

=== Nevada ===
| | 1 | 2 | 3 | 4 | Total |
|---|---|---|---|---|---|
| LA Tech | 0 | 3 | 7 | 0 | 10 |
| Nevada | 14 | 7 | 21 | 7 | 49 |
