= 2007 New Mexico State Aggies football team =

American college football season

2007 New Mexico State Aggies football
- Conference: Western Athletic Conference
- Record: 4–9 (1–7 WAC)
- Head coach: Hal Mumme (3rd season)
- Co-offensive coordinators: Gary Goff (3rd season); Matt Mumme (3rd season)
- Offensive scheme: Air raid
- Defensive coordinator: Woody Widenhofer (3rd season)
- Base defense: 4–3
- Home stadium: Aggie Memorial Stadium

2007 Western Athletic Conference football standings
| | Conf. | | | Overall |
| Team | W | | L | W | | L |
|---|---|---|---|---|---|---|
| No. 19 Hawaii $ | 8 | – | 0 | 12 | – | 1 |
| Boise State | 7 | – | 1 | 10 | – | 3 |
| Fresno State | 6 | – | 2 | 9 | – | 4 |
| Nevada | 4 | – | 4 | 6 | – | 7 |
| Louisiana Tech | 4 | – | 4 | 5 | – | 7 |
| San Jose State | 4 | – | 4 | 5 | – | 7 |
| Utah State | 2 | – | 6 | 2 | – | 10 |
| New Mexico State | 1 | – | 7 | 4 | – | 9 |
| Idaho | 0 | – | 8 | 1 | – | 11 |
$ – Conference champion and BCS representative as top non-AQ school to meet automatic qualification criteria; Rankings from AP Poll

The 2007 New Mexico State Aggies football team represented New Mexico State University in the 2007 NCAA Division I FBS football season. The Aggies were coached by head coach Hal Mumme and played their home games at Aggie Memorial Stadium in Las Cruces, New Mexico. They participated as members of the Western Athletic Conference.

== Schedule ==
| Date | Time | Opponent | Site | TV | Result | Attendance |
|---|---|---|---|---|---|---|
| August 30 | 6:00 pm | Southeastern Louisiana* | Aggie Memorial Stadium; Las Cruces, NM | AV | W 35–14 | 12,682 |
| September 8 | 7:30 pm | at New Mexico* | University Stadium; Albuquerque, NM (Rio Grande Rivalry) | mtn | L 34–44 | 41,033 |
| September 15 | 6:00 pm | UTEP* | Aggie Memorial Stadium; Las Cruces, NM (Battle of I-10) | AV | W 29–24 | 30,343 |
| September 22 | 5:00 pm | at Auburn* | Jordan-Hare Stadium; Auburn, AL | PPV | L 20–55 | 83,012 |
| September 29 | 6:00 pm | Arkansas–Pine Bluff* | Aggie Memorial Stadium; Las Cruces, NM | AV | W 20–17 | 15,329 |
| October 7 | 6:00 pm | at Boise State | Bronco Stadium; Boise, ID | ESPN | L 0–58 | 30,239 |
| October 13 | 5:00 pm | at Louisiana Tech | Joe Aillet Stadium; Ruston, LA | ESPN Plus | L 21–22 | 18,211 |
| October 20 | 6:00 pm | Idaho^{†} | Aggie Memorial Stadium; Las Cruces, NM | AV | W 45–31 | 15,788 |
| October 27 | 10:05 pm | at No. 14 Hawaii | Aloha Stadium; Halawa, HI | K5 Hawaii | L 13–50 | 41,218 |
| November 2 | 6:00 pm | Nevada | Aggie Memorial Stadium; Las Cruces, NM | ESPN2 | L 38–40 | 12,268 |
| November 10 | 2:00 pm | at San Jose State | Spartan Stadium; San Jose, CA | AV | L 17–51 | 10,452 |
| November 17 | 12:00 pm | Utah State | Aggie Memorial Stadium; Las Cruces, NM | AV | L 17–35 | 7,537 |
| November 30 | 6:00 pm | Fresno State | Aggie Memorial Stadium; Las Cruces, NM | ESPN2 | L 23–30 | 6,937 |
*Non-conference game; ^{†}Homecoming; Rankings from AP Poll released prior to the game; All times are in Mountain time
