= 2007 Boise State Broncos football team =

American college football season

2007 Boise State Broncos football

Hawaii Bowl, L 38–41 vs. East Carolina
- Conference: Western Athletic Conference
- Record: 10–3 (7–1 WAC)
- Head coach: Chris Petersen (2nd season)
- Offensive coordinator: Bryan Harsin (2nd season)
- Offensive scheme: Multiple
- Defensive coordinator: Justin Wilcox (2nd season)
- Base defense: 4–3
- Home stadium: Bronco Stadium

2007 Western Athletic Conference football standings
	Conf.			Overall
Team	W		L	W		L
No. 19 Hawaii $	8	–	0	12	–	1
Boise State	7	–	1	10	–	3
Fresno State	6	–	2	9	–	4
Nevada	4	–	4	6	–	7
Louisiana Tech	4	–	4	5	–	7
San Jose State	4	–	4	5	–	7
Utah State	2	–	6	2	–	10
New Mexico State	1	–	7	4	–	9
Idaho	0	–	8	1	–	11
$ – Conference champion and BCS representative as top non-AQ school to meet automatic qualification criteria; Rankings from AP Poll

The 2007 Boise State Broncos football team represented Boise State University in the 2007 NCAA Division I FBS football season. The Broncos, led by second year head coach Chris Petersen, play their home games at Bronco Stadium, most famous for its blue artificial turf surface, often referred to as the "smurf-turf", and were members of the Western Athletic Conference. The Broncos finished the season 10–3, 7–1 in WAC play and failed to win the WAC for the first time since 2001. They were invited to the Hawaii Bowl, where they were defeated by East Carolina, 41–38.

== Pre-season ==
Boise State was picked to finish second in the WAC by the media and by the coaches during the WAC media days. Hawaii was picked first in both polls. The Broncos were ranked #23 in the first Coaches poll and #24 in the AP poll. The Broncos enter the season with the nation's longest winning streak (13).

=== Pre-season awards ===
Ryan Clady- Outland Trophy Watch List, Rotary Lombardi Award Watch List, Playboy All American Team, NationalChamps.net 2nd Team All-American.

Ian Johnson- Heisman Trophy Candidate, Maxwell Award Watch List, Walter Camp Foundation Player of the Year Award Watch List, Doak Walker Award Candidate, Athlon, Street & Smith's and NationalChamps.net 3rd Team All-American.

Marty Tadman- Chuck Bednarick Award Watch List, Walter Camp Award Watch List, Sports Illustrated First Team All-American, NationalChamps.net Honorable Mention.

== During the season ==
The 2007 season started Thursday, August 30, 2007. Boise State played 5 games on either ESPN or ESPN2. The Southern Miss game was played on a Thursday, the Nevada and New Mexico State games were played on Sundays and the Fresno State and Hawaii games were played on Fridays. The Washington game was also televised nationally via FOX Sports NET. Any game not televised nationally was broadcast locally in Boise on KTVB.

The Broncos also debuted new uniforms in the 2007 season, the most notable feature being the removal of last names on backs. The last names were put back on the uniforms for the final game of the regular season against Hawaii and remained for the Hawaii Bowl.

== Schedule ==
Date	Time	Opponent	Rank	Site	TV	Result	Attendance
August 30	7:00 pm	Weber State*	No. 24	Bronco Stadium; Boise, ID	KTVB	W 56–7	30,278
September 8	1:30 pm	at Washington*	No. 22	Husky Stadium; Seattle, WA	FSN	L 10–24	70,045
September 15	6:00 pm	Wyoming*^{†}		Bronco Stadium; Boise, ID	KTVB	W 24–14	30,199
September 27	5:30 pm	Southern Miss*		Bronco Stadium; Boise, ID	ESPN	W 38–16	30,159
October 7	6:00 pm	New Mexico State		Bronco Stadium; Boise, ID	ESPN	W 58–0	30,239
October 14	6:00 pm	Nevada		Bronco Stadium; Boise, ID (rivalry)	ESPN	W 69–67 ^{4OT}	30,394
October 20	5:00 pm	at Louisiana Tech		Joe Aillet Stadium; Ruston, LA	KTVB	W 45–31	19,199
October 26	7:00 pm	at Fresno State		Bulldog Stadium; Fresno, CA (Battle for the Milk Can)	ESPN2	W 34–21	40,607
November 3	1:00 pm	San Jose State	No. 21	Bronco Stadium; Boise, ID	KTVB	W 42–7	30,416
November 10	1:00 pm	at Utah State	No. 19	Romney Stadium; Logan, UT	KTVB	W 52–0	18,864
November 17	12:00 pm	Idaho	No. 17	Bronco Stadium; Boise, ID (Battle for the Governor's Trophy)	KTVB	W 58–14	30,681
November 23	7:00 pm	at No. 14 Hawaii	No. 17	Aloha Stadium; Honolulu, HI	ESPN2	L 27–39	50,000
December 23	6:00 pm	vs. East Carolina*	No. 24	Aloha Stadium; Honolulu, HI (Sheraton Hawaii Bowl)	ESPN	L 38–41	30,467
*Non-conference game; ^{†}Homecoming; Rankings from Coaches' Poll released prior to the game; All times are in Mountain time

== Rankings ==
Ranking movements Legend: ██ Increase in ranking ██ Decrease in ranking — = Not ranked RV = Received votes
	Week															
Poll	Pre	1	2	3	4	5	6	7	8	9	10	11	12	13	14	Final
AP	24	22	RV	—	—	RV	RV	RV	RV	21	19	17	17	24	24	RV
Coaches Poll	23	20	RV	RV	RV	RV	RV	RV	RV	22	19	15	17	23	22	RV
Harris	Not released				—	RV	RV	RV	RV	22	19	15	15	22	22	Not released
BCS	Not released							—	—	22	20	18	19	25	24	Not released

== Game results ==
=== Weber State ===
	1	2	3	4	Total
Wildcats	0	0	7	0	7
#23 Broncos	28	21	7	0	56

56-7. Boise State opened its season hosting the Weber State Wildcats of Division I Football Championship Subdivision's (formerly known as I-AA) Big Sky Conference. The Broncos scored on their first seven possessions to run the score to 49-0 at halftime. Ian Johnson rushed for 129 yards and 3 touchdowns, including a 54-yard run, and quarterback Taylor Tharp went 14-19 for 184 yards and 1 touchdown in his first collegiate start. Boise State gained a total of 571 yards to Weber State's 145. The victory pushed Boise States nations best winning streak to 14.

=== Washington ===
	1	2	3	4	Total
#20 Broncos	7	3	0	0	10
Huskies	14	10	0	0	24

24-10. Washington snapped the Broncos 14 game win streak. The Broncos were held to their lowest point total since losing 27-7 to Fresno State in 2005. Ian Johnson was held to 81 yards on 20 carries and Taylor Tharp went 29/47 for 281 and 3 interceptions and lost a fumble when he fell down while attempting a hand off in the loss. Washington started the game fast, jumping to a 14-0 lead. Boise State returned a kickoff for a touchdown after Washington's first score, but it was called back. Boise State never recovered.

=== Wyoming ===
	1	2	3	4	Total
Cowboys	0	0	0	14	14
Broncos	0	7	14	3	24

24-14. Boise State ran their home winning streak to 8 and 53 of the last 55 with the 24-14 win over Wyoming. Ian Johnson had another subpar game rushing 24 times for 83 yards. Taylor Tharp went 15 of 30 for 182 and two touchdowns, one being a 52 yarder to Sophomore Jeremy Childs. The Bronco defense held the Cowboys to just 35 yards on 24 rushing attempts and collected three sacks of quarterback Karsten Sween. Kick returner Rashaun Scott was awarded the WAC special teams player of the week with two kickoffs returned for an average of 36.5 yards, one being for 52 yards in the fourth quarter. Boise State is still undefeated (11-0) against teams from the Mountain West Conference since its formation.

=== Southern Miss ===
	1	2	3	4	Total
Golden Eagles	0	10	6	0	16
Broncos	14	14	7	3	38

38-16. Ian Johnson had his best game of the season thus far as he rushed for 111 yards and 3 touchdowns on 22 carries and added 80 yards on 3 receptions to earn the WAC offensive player of the week award. Taylor Tharp surpassed 300 yards passing for the first time as a starter by posting 307 yards on 19 of 27 for 2 touchdowns and 1 interception. The Broncos offense surpassed 500 yards with 506 total yards. The Broncos won their 39th consecutive regular season home game in front of a crowd of 30,159 that wore blue and orange in alternating sections in what has become known as the "Blue and Orange out."

=== New Mexico State ===
	1	2	3	4	Total
Aggies	0	0	0	0	0
Broncos	21	14	10	13	58

58-0. Boise State held the Aggies to 89 total yards of offense on -19 rushing yards and 108 passing yards. The Broncos gained over 600 yards of offense for the first time since November 20, 2004 by gaining 604 yards. Taylor Tharp went 19 of 26 for 251 and 4 Touchdowns. Jeremy Childs had the best game of his career with 6 catches for 102 yards and 3 touchdowns. The Broncos had 3 interceptions of Aggie quarterbacks (Scandrick, Wilson, Tadman). Boise State blocked 2 Aggie punts.

=== Nevada ===
	1	2	3	4	OT	Total
Wolf Pack	7	14	7	16	23	67
Broncos	7	21	3	13	25	69

69-67. After 1,266 combined total yards and an NCAA FBS record 136 points, Boise State was able to come away with the thrilling 69-67 win in four overtimes. Ian Johnson had 251 all purpose yards and three touchdowns, one of which was a career long 72-yard run. Taylor Tharp went 26-35 for 320, four touchdowns and one interception. Kicker Kyle Brotzman scored nineteen points on seven extra points and four field goals (40, 31, 27, 29), one coming with just three seconds left in regulation to send the game to overtime. Jeremy Childs had a career day making 12 catches for 140 yards and one touchdown. The game was sealed when Tim Brady sacked Nevada quarterback Colin Kaepernick on a two-point conversion attempt that would have tied and extended the game. Boise State now has won eight straight games over the Wolfpack and stay undefeated at home all time in WAC play. Ian Johnson was named the WAC offensive player of the week and Kyle Brotzman was named the WAC special teams player of the week. (The 136 points total record was matched later in the season when Navy beat North Texas 74-62)

=== Louisiana Tech ===
	1	2	3	4	Total
Broncos	14	3	14	14	45
Bulldogs	7	10	7	7	31

45-31. The Broncos and Bulldogs battled back and forth for 3 quarters, being tied four times at 7, 14, 17, and 24. Then the game was changed on an Orlando Scandrick forced fumble that led to an 83-yard touchdown pass from Taylor Tharp to Jeremy Childs. Tharp and Childs hooked up again from 27 yards out to seal the game late in the fourth. The total yards were almost identical (BSU 465, LATECH 463), but the Bulldogs were doomed by 4 turnovers. Tharp finished 21 of 35 for 328, 2 INTS and a career-high 5 touchdowns. Childs went over 100 yards for the third straight game making 7 receptions for 143 and the two fourth-quarter touchdowns.

=== Fresno State ===
	1	2	3	4	Total
Broncos	14	3	7	10	34
Bulldogs	14	0	0	7	21

34-21. Backup Running Backs Jeremy Avery and D.J. Harper filled the shoes of injured starter Ian Johnson by leading the Bronco rush attack that ran for 282 yards. Avery gained 124 yards on 18 carries and 3 touchdowns while Harper rushed for 153 yards on 19 carries and 1 touchdown. Taylor Tharp went 18 for 29 for 158 yards, 9 of his completions going to Jeremy Childs for 82 yards. Kyle Brotzman went 2 for 2 on field goals (43, 47, a career long) to win his second WAC special teams player of the week award this season and the Broncos blocked their sixth kick of the season by blocking a Bulldog field goal in the 2nd quarter. The Broncos beat the Bulldogs for the sixth time in the last seven years to win the Milk Can, the traveling trophy between the two schools that started in 2005. The game resulted in Boise State jumping back into the two major polls being #22 in the USA Today and tied with Wake Forrest at #21 in the AP as well as being #22 in the BCS rankings.

=== San Jose State ===
	1	2	3	4	Total
Spartans	0	7	0	0	7
#22 Broncos	0	21	14	7	42

42-7. Taylor Tharp hit nine different receivers as he went 28 of 35 for 259, 3 touchdowns and 1 pick to lead the Broncos to their 42nd straight regular season home win. The Bronco defense held the Spartan offense to 150 total yards marking the 3rd time this season the Bronco defense has held opponents to 150 yards or less (Weber State, New Mexico State). Freshman receiver Austin Pettis had a breakout game making 7 receptions for 54 yards and 2 Touchdowns. The Bronco offense gained a total of 434 yards, but special teams was able to shorten the field by having returns of 51, 38, and 48 yards. The Bronco special teams, late in the game, was also able to block their 7th kick of the season by blocking a Spartan field goal. The Broncos moved up to #20 in the BCS rankings and #19 in both the USA Today and AP polls as a result of the win.

=== Utah State ===
	1	2	3	4	Total
#19 Broncos	17	14	14	7	52
Aggies	0	0	0	0	0

52-0. Taylor Tharp went 26 of 29 for 283 and 2 touchdowns to lead the Broncos to their 8th straight win and their 7th straight against the Aggies. Ian Johnson broke 100 yards for the first time in 5 weeks by gaining 110 yards on 19 carries and a touchdown. Dallas Dobbs won WAC defensive player of the week with 4 tackles, one for a loss of 3 yards and 1 interception returned 29 yards to set up a 4th quarter Bronco touchdown. The Broncos blocked two more kicks, bringing their total to 9, 3 shy of the school record. One of the blocked kicks was a punt that was picked up and returned for a touchdown by Ia Falo. The other being a field goal blocked by Orlando Scandrick. The Broncos jumped to #15 in the USA Today coaches poll, #17 in the AP poll, and #18 in the BCS.

=== Idaho ===
	1	2	3	4	Total
Vandals	0	14	0	0	14
#15 Broncos	7	17	21	13	58

58-14. The Broncos defeated their in-state rivals for the ninth straight year, retained the Governor's Trophy, and remained undefeated in WAC play to set up an unofficial WAC championship game with Hawaii. Taylor Tharp once again had a great game going 22 of 31 for 282 and 4 touchdowns. Freshman Austin Pettis had a career game making 8 receptions for 139 yards and 3 touchdowns. Backup Quarterback Bush Hamden added 2 touchdown passes, giving the Broncos 6 TD's through the air. With the win, the Broncos capped off their 7th straight season of going undefeated in WAC play at home in all 7 years they have been in the WAC. The Broncos remained at #17 in the AP poll, dropped 2 spots in the Coaches poll to #17, and dropped 1 spot to #19 in the BCS.

=== Hawaii ===
	1	2	3	4	Total
#17 Broncos	7	10	10	0	27
#13 Warriors	7	12	20	0	39

39-27. Boise State was unable to secure the WAC championship for the first time since 2001. Hawaii's Colt Brennan went 40 of 53 for 495, 5 TD's and 2 INT's to lead the Warriors past the Broncos for the first time since Boise State joined the WAC. The loss also ended the Broncos Conference winning streak at 17. Taylor Tharp went 22 of 36 for 231, 1 TD and 1 INT. Kyle Brotzman won the WAC special teams player of the week for the third time this season going 2-3 on FG's, 3 made extra points, and a punting average of 55.5 on his 4 punts, including a 71 yarder and 3 downed inside the 20-yard line. The Broncos blocked 2 Warrior extra points, bringing their total for the season to 11 blocked kicks.

=== Hawaii Bowl - East Carolina ===
2007 Sheraton Hawaii Bowl
- Bowl game
East Carolina Pirates	Boise State Broncos
(7-5)	(10-2)
41	38
Head coach: Skip Holtz	Head coach: Chris Petersen
AP / Coaches / BCS; NR / NR / NR	AP / Coaches / BCS; 24 / 22 / 24
	1	2	3	4	Total
East Carolina	10	21	7	3	41
Boise State	7	7	10	14	38
- Date: December 23, 2007
- Season: 2007
- Stadium: Aloha Stadium
- Location: Honolulu, Hawaii
- Favorite: Boise State

Ben Hartman's 34-yard field goal as time expired clinched the upset victory for the Pirates over the #24 ranked Broncos. Other than an 89-yard Austin Smith kickoff return for a touchdown, the Broncos really couldn't get much going in the first half. ECU's Chris Johnson set an NCAA bowl record with 408 all purpose yards as he helped ECU build a 38-14 lead mid way through the 3rd quarter. The Broncos came back to make the game 38-31 late in the 4th and were driving to try to tie the game when a Titus Young fumble appeared to seal the Broncos fate. Two plays later as ECU was trying to run out the clock, Chris Johnson fumbled which led to a Marty Tadman 47-yard touchdown return to tie the game with 1:25 to play. ECU then drove the field to lead to Hartman's game-winning field goal. The Broncos are now 5-3 all time in Bowl games, but are 1-3 in their last 4 bowl games and have had 5 straight bowl games decided on the last play of the game or decided within the last few seconds.

== WAC standings ==
Team	Conf. W-L	Overall W-L	Bowl Game
#10 Hawaii	8-0	12-1	BCS Allstate Sugar Bowl
#23 Boise State	7-1	10-3	Sharaton Hawaii Bowl
Fresno State	6-2	9-4	Roady's Humanitarian Bowl
Nevada	4-4	6-7	New Mexico Bowl
Louisiana Tech	4-4	5-7	
San Jose State	4-4	5-7	
Utah State	2-6	2-10	
New Mexico State	1-7	4-9	
Idaho	0-8	1-11	

== Post Season Awards ==
=== First Team All WAC ===
Jeremy Childs- So. WR

Ryan Clady- Jr. OL

Ian Johnson- Jr. RB

Nick Schlekeway-Sr. DL

Marty Tadman- Sr. DB

=== Second Team All WAC ===
Tad Miller- Sr. OL

Taylor Tharp- Sr. QB

Kyle Wilson-So. DB

Kyle Brotzman- Fr. K

== Roster ==
(Updated 11/19/07)
Quarterbacks: 10 Taylor Tharp - Senior; 3 Bush Hamdan - Junior; 15 Nick Lomax - Sophomore; 7 Michael Howe - Freshman; 11 Kellen Moore- Freshman; Running backs: 41 Ian Johnson^{†} - Junior; 22 Doug Martin - Freshman; 27 Jeremy Avery - Freshman; 28 Jarvis Hodge - Freshman; 34 D.J. Harper - Freshman; Stephen Gabbard - Freshman; Fullbacks: 30 Michael Lose - Senior; 40 Richie Brockel - Sophomore; Wide receivers^{†}: 2 Tanyon Bissell - Junior; 11 Nick Harris - Junior; 19 Vinny Perretta - Junior^{†}; 21 Toshi Franklin - Junior; 82 Julian Hawkins - Junior; 9 Jeremy Childs - Sophomore; 46 Michael Choate - Sophomore; 81 Evan Surratt - Sophomore; 4 Titus Young - Freshman; 83 Ricky Cookman - Freshman; 87 Austin Pettis - Freshman; 89 Tyler Shoemaker- Freshman; Offensive guards: 61 Jeff Biedermann - Senior; 64 Pete Cavender - Senior; 66 Tad Miller^{†} - Senior; 60 Andrew Woodruff^{†} - Junior; 76 Jon Gott - Junior; Offensive tackles: 75 Dan Gore - Senior; 77 Ben Iannacchione - Junior; 79 Ryan Clady^{†} - Junior; 72 Matt Slater - Sophomore; 73 Nate Potter - Freshman; Centers: 54 Jeff Cavender^{†} - Senior; 68 Mitch Rudder - Sophomore; 78 Paul Lucariello - Sophomore; 65 Thomas Byrd- Freshman; Other Offensive Lineman: 57 Garret Pendergast- Freshman; 62 Kevin Sapien - Freshman; 63 Joey Chavez- Freshman; 69 Sam Douthit- Freshman; 70 Zach Waller- Freshman; 71 Cory Yriarte- Freshman; Tight ends: 39 Ryan Putnam - Senior; 86 Sherm Blaser - Senior; 47 Ryan Angstman- Junior; 88 Chris O'Neill - Junior; 85 Tommy Gallarda - Sophomore; 80 Kyle Efaw- Freshman	Defensive ends: 97 Nick Schlekeway^{†} - Senior; 53 Sean Bingham - Junior; 93 Mike T. Williams^{†} - Junior; 99 Steven Reveles - Junior; 98 Ryan Winterswyk - Sophomore; 48 Kapono Rawlins-Crivello - Freshman; 96 Jarrell Root- Freshman; Defensive tackles: 90 Ian Smart - Senior; 95 Sione Tavake - Senior; 67 Joe Bozikovich - Junior; 94 Phillip Edwards - Junior; 50 J.P. Nisby- Freshman; 59 Will Lawrence - Freshman; 74 Billy Winn- Freshman; Linebackers: 13 Mike Altieri - Senior; 56 Josh Bean - Senior; 18 Ellis Powers - Junior; 24 Tim Brady - Junior; 43 David Shields^{†} - Junior; 44 Kyle Gingg^{†} - Junior; 51 Dallas Dobbs - Junior; 52 Derrell Acrey - Freshman; 25 Hunter White- Freshman; 28 Dave Wilson- Freshman; 33 Ben Chandler- Freshman; 36 Arron Tevis- Freshman; 42 Matt Wilson- Freshman; Cody Darrington- Freshman; Cornerbacks: 6 Rashaun Scott - Senior; 26 Ia Falo - Senior; 8 Orlando Scandrick^{†} - Junior; 32 Daniel Cortez- Sophomore; 1 Kyle Wilson^{†} - Sophomore; 17 Keith McGowen - Freshman; 31 Antwon Murray- Freshman; 38 Brandyn Thompson- Freshman; Cedric Febis- Freshman; Safeties: 20 Marty Tadman^{†} - Senior; 37 Austin Smith - Senior; 14 Garcia Day - Junior; 5 Jason Robinson - Freshman; 15 Shaun Jordan- Freshman; 23 Jeron Johnson - Freshman; Punters: 49 Brad Elkin- Freshman; Kickers: 14 Brock Jaramillo- Junior; 35 Kyle Brotzman - Freshman
† Returning Starter at position
