= 2007 Utah State Aggies football team =

American college football season

2007 Utah State Aggies football
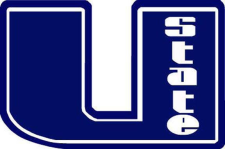
- Conference: Western Athletic Conference
- Record: 2–10 (2–6 WAC)
- Head coach: Brent Guy (3rd season)
- Offensive coordinator: Darrell Dickey (1st season)
- Defensive coordinator: Mark Johnson (3rd season)
- Home stadium: Romney Stadium

2007 Western Athletic Conference football standings
	Conf.			Overall
Team	W		L	W		L
No. 19 Hawaii $	8	–	0	12	–	1
Boise State	7	–	1	10	–	3
Fresno State	6	–	2	9	–	4
Nevada	4	–	4	6	–	7
Louisiana Tech	4	–	4	5	–	7
San Jose State	4	–	4	5	–	7
Utah State	2	–	6	2	–	10
New Mexico State	1	–	7	4	–	9
Idaho	0	–	8	1	–	11
$ – Conference champion and BCS representative as top non-AQ school to meet automatic qualification criteria; Rankings from AP Poll

The 2007 Utah State Aggies football team represented Utah State University as a member of the Western Athletic Conference (WAC) in 2007 NCAA Division I FBS football season. The Aggies were led by third-year head coach Brent Guy and played their home games in Romney Stadium in Logan, Utah. The Aggies finished the season 2–10 overall and 2–6 in WAC play to place fifth.

== Schedule ==
Date	Time	Opponent	Site	Result	Attendance
August 30		UNLV*	Romney Stadium; Logan, UT	L 16–23	15,102
September 8	12:00 pm	at Wyoming*	War Memorial; Laramie, WY (rivalry)	L 18–32	19,443
September 15		at No. 3 Oklahoma*	Gaylord Family Oklahoma Memorial Stadium; Norman, OK	L 3–54	84,403
September 22		San Jose State	Romney Stadium; Logan, UT	L 20–23	13,685
September 29		at Utah*	Rice-Eccles Stadium; Salt Lake City, UT (Battle of the Brothers)	L 18–34	41,884
October 6		at No. 15 Hawaii	Aloha Stadium; Halawa, HI	L 37–52	36,360
October 20		Nevada	Romney Stadium; Logan, UT	L 28–31	9,462
October 27		Louisiana Tech	Romney Stadium; Logan, UT	L 21–31	8,543
November 3		at Fresno State	Bulldog Stadium; Fresno, CA	L 27–38	32,904
November 10		No. 19 Boise State	Romney Stadium; Logan, UT	L 0–52	18,864
November 17		at New Mexico State	Aggie Memorial Stadium; Las Cruces, NM	W 35–17	7,537
November 24		at Idaho	Kibbie Dome; Moscow, ID	W 24–19	8,102
*Non-conference game; Rankings from Coaches' Poll released prior to the game; All times are in Mountain time
