= 2007 Fresno State Bulldogs football team =

American college football season

2007 Fresno State Bulldogs football

Humanitarian Bowl champion

Humanitarian Bowl, W 40–28 vs. Georgia Tech
- Conference: Western Athletic Conference
- Record: 9–4 (6–2 WAC)
- Head coach: Pat Hill (11th season)
- Offensive coordinator: Jim McElwain (1st season)
- Offensive scheme: Pro-style
- Defensive coordinator: Dan Brown (7th season)
- Base defense: 4–3
- Home stadium: Bulldog Stadium (Capacity: 41,031)

2007 Western Athletic Conference football standings
	Conf.			Overall
Team	W		L	W		L
No. 19 Hawaii $	8	–	0	12	–	1
Boise State	7	–	1	10	–	3
Fresno State	6	–	2	9	–	4
Nevada	4	–	4	6	–	7
Louisiana Tech	4	–	4	5	–	7
San Jose State	4	–	4	5	–	7
Utah State	2	–	6	2	–	10
New Mexico State	1	–	7	4	–	9
Idaho	0	–	8	1	–	11
$ – Conference champion and BCS representative as top non-AQ school to meet automatic qualification criteria; Rankings from AP Poll

The 2007 Fresno State football team represented California State University, Fresno in the 2007 NCAA Division I FBS football season. This season was the Bulldogs' 27th in their current home of Bulldog Stadium in Fresno, California and their 11th with Pat Hill as head coach.

== Preseason ==
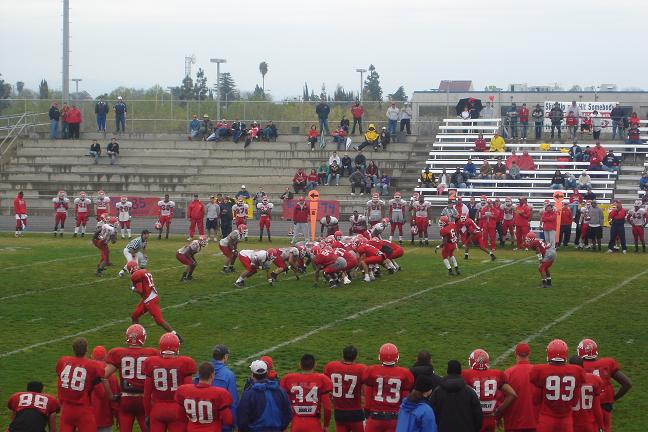
Spring 2007 Scrimmage in Visalia

At the end of the 2006 season, former offensive coordinator Steve Hagen resigned to accept the coaching position of offensive coordinator at North Carolina. He will be replaced by Oakland Raiders assistant head coach and quarterbacks coach Jim McElwain. Former Fresno State quarterback Jeff Grady, who had worked as an assistant coach at Fresno State in previous years, was promoted to tight end coach for 2007.

Fresno State RB Dwayne Wright decided to forgo his senior season and enter the 2007 NFL draft at the end of the 2006 season. He was projected as either a late second or early third round draft pick, but was not chosen until the fourth round. RB Lonyae Miller is expected to start in his place.

The Bulldogs opened spring drills on March 7 and the annual spring game took place on April 28.

== Schedule ==
Date	Time	Opponent	Site	TV	Result	Attendance
September 1	7:00 pm	Sacramento State*	Bulldog Stadium; Fresno, CA		W 24–3	35,963
September 8	2:30 pm	at No. 23 Texas A&M*	Kyle Field; College Station, TX	FSN	L 45–47 ^{3OT}	75,922
September 15	3:30 pm	at No. 19 Oregon*	Autzen Stadium; Eugene, OR		L 21–52	58,525
September 29	7:00 pm	Louisiana Tech	Bulldog Stadium; Fresno, CA		W 17–6	38,104
October 6	1:00 pm	at Nevada	Mackay Stadium; Reno, NV		W 49–41	18,503
October 13	2:00 pm	at Idaho	Kibbie Dome; Moscow, ID		W 37–24	14,205
October 20	2:00 pm	San Jose State^{†}	Bulldog Stadium; Fresno, CA (rivalry)		W 30–0	35,494
October 26	6:00 pm	Boise State	Bulldog Stadium; Fresno, CA (Battle for the Milk Can)	ESPN2	L 21–34	40,607
November 3	2:00 pm	Utah State	Bulldog Stadium; Fresno, CA		W 38–27	32,904
November 10	8:05 pm	at No. 14 Hawaii	Aloha Stadium; Honolulu, HI (rivalry)		L 30–37	49,047
November 24	12:30 pm	Kansas State*	Bulldog Stadium; Fresno, CA	ESPN2	W 45–29	34,671
November 30	5:00 pm	at New Mexico State	Aggie Memorial Stadium; Las Cruces, NM	ESPN2	W 30–23	6,397
December 31	11:00 am	vs. Georgia Tech*	Bronco Stadium; Boise, ID (Humanitarian Bowl)	ESPN2	W 40–28	27,062
*Non-conference game; ^{†}Homecoming; Rankings from AP Poll released prior to the game; All times are in Pacific time

== Personnel ==
=== Coaching staff ===
Name	Position	Seasons at Fresno State	Alma mater
Pat Hill	Head coach	11th as HC; 17th overall	UC Riverside (1973)
Jim McElwain	Offensive coordinator	1st	Eastern Washington University (1983)
Dan Brown	Defensive coordinator	10th	Boise State (1982)
Jeff Grady	Tight Ends	1st	
John Baxter	Special Teams/Wide Receivers/Assistant Head Coach	11th	Loras College
Tom Mason	Assistant Head Coach/Linebackers	7th	Nevada (1977)
Kerry Locklin	Defensive line	8th	New Mexico State (1982)
Tim Skipper	Running backs	2nd	Fresno State (2001)
Randy Stewart	Secondary	1st?	
Derek Frazier	Offensive line	1st?	
Andy Buh	Graduate Assistant	1st	

=== Roster ===
(as of 04/09/2007)
Wide receivers: 5 Marlon Moore – sophomore; 6 Chastin West^{†} – sophomore; 13 Jason Crawley – sophomore; 19 Seyi Ajirotutu^{†} – sophomore; 17 Jamel Hamler – freshman; 25 Shannon Dorsey – senior''*; 86 Darren Newborne – sophomore; Offensive line: 52 Richard Pacheco – sophomore; 60 Kenny Wiggins – freshman*; 61 Charley Robbins – freshman*; 62 Cole Popovich^{†} – OG; 65 Pierce Masse – junior; 68 James Meeks – sophomore; 69 Andrew Jackson – freshman*; 71 Nick Wright – freshman*; 72 Bobby Lepori^{†} – junior; 73 Kenny Avon – junior; 74 Joe Bernardi – freshman*; 75 Chris Piligian – senior*; 76 Adam McDowell^{†} – junior; 77 Ryan Wendell^{†} – senior; 79 Sean Yandall – junior; 97 Jason Shirley – senior*; Tight ends: 49 Cameron Harris – junior; 80 Drew Lubinsky – junior; 81 Norman Davis – sophomore; 85 Bear Pascoe^{†} – junior; 88 Jesus Tapia – senior*	Quarterbacks: 7 Tom Brandstater^{†} – QB Junior; 16 Matt Christian – freshman; 15 Ryan Colburn – freshman*; Running backs: 1 Lonyae Miller^{†} – RB Sophomore; 2 Clifton Smith – senior*; 22 Anthony Harding – sophomore; 27 Rich Owens – sophomore; 44 Frank Padilla – freshman*; 34 Jamal Rashad – sophomore; Fullbacks: 40 Nathan Adams – senior*; 45 Isaac Kinter^{†} – sophomore; 48 Reynard Camp – sophomore; Defensive ends: 11 Tyler Clutts – senior*; 41 Ikenna Ike – junior; 7 Jason Roberts^{†} – junior; 90 Taylor Smith – freshman*; 55 Michael Stuart^{†} – junior; Defensive tackles: 42 Charles Tolbert^{†} – senior; 50 Cornell Banks – freshman*; 95 Mark Roberts – freshman*; 94 Jon Monga^{†} – junior; 96 Wilson Ramos – sophomore	Linebackers: 10 Nico Herron – freshman*; 27 Chris Lewis – freshman*; 31 Marcus Riley – senior*; 32 Quaadir Brown^{†} – Sophomore; 34 Trevor Shamblee – senior*; 35 Nick Bates – sophomore; 43 Ahijah Lane – senior*; 47 Ryan Machado^{†} – sophomore; 48 Frank Manquero – sophomore; 49 Todd Chisom – sophomore; 54 Ben Jacobs – freshman*; 56 Robert Schenck – freshman*; 58 Ryan McKinley^{†} – junior; Defensive backs: 4 Damion Owens^{†} – sophomore; 22 Damon Jenkins – senior*; 26 Jason Blackmon^{†} – sophomore; 27 Jay Reddick – sophomore; 28 A.J. Jefferson – sophomore; 46 Will Harding – senior; Safeties: 19 Marvin Haynes^{†} – sophomore; 40 Brian Gridiron – senior; 23 Jake Jorde – junior; 20 Lorne Bell – freshman*; 3 Moses Harris^{†} – sophomore; Punters: 42 Robert Malone^{†} – P sophomore; Kickers: 39 Clint Stitser – senior*; 35 Kyle Zimmerman^{†} – K senior*; Long snapper: 90 Ken Amendola – senior*
† Projected starter at position * Injured.

=== Depth chart ===
Defensive Starters

FS
Marvin Haynes
Jake Jorde

CB
Damon Jenkins
Marvin Haynes

WLB	MLB	SLB
Marcus Riley	Trevor Shamblee	Ahjah Lane
Qaadir Brown	Ryan Machado	Ryan McKinley

DE	DT	DT	DE
Tyler Clutts	Charles Tolbert	Jon Monga	Jason Roberts
Michael Stuart	Kenny Avon	Ikenna Ike	Marlon Brisco

SS
Mosses Harris
AJ Jefferson

CB
Jason Blackmon
Damion Owens

Offensive Starters

WR
Chastin West
Jason Crawley

LT	LG	C	RG	RT
James Paulk	Cole Popovich	Cameron Harris	Ryan Wendell	Adam McDowell
Bobby Lepori	Robin Kezirian	Joe Bernardi	Richard Pacheo	Pierce Masse

TE
Bear Pascoe
Jesus Tapia

WR
Seyi Ajirotutu
Kevin Ciccone

QB
Tom Brandstater
Ryan Colburn

FB
Roshon Vercher
Nate Adams

RB
Lonyae Miller
Anthony Harding

== Game summaries ==
=== Sacramento State ===
	1	2	3	4	Total
Hornets	0	3	0	0	3
Bulldogs	7	7	7	3	24

Quarterback Tom Brandstater went 16 of 27 for 199 yards in the victory against in-state FCS rival Sacramento State, who was limited to 102 total yards. Lonyae Miller and Clifton Smith both found the end zone for touchdowns, while freshmen running back Ryan Matthews ran for 77 yards on the night. The game also featured Fresno State's retirement of David Carr's No. 8 jersey during the halftime ceremony.

=== At No. 23 Texas A&M ===
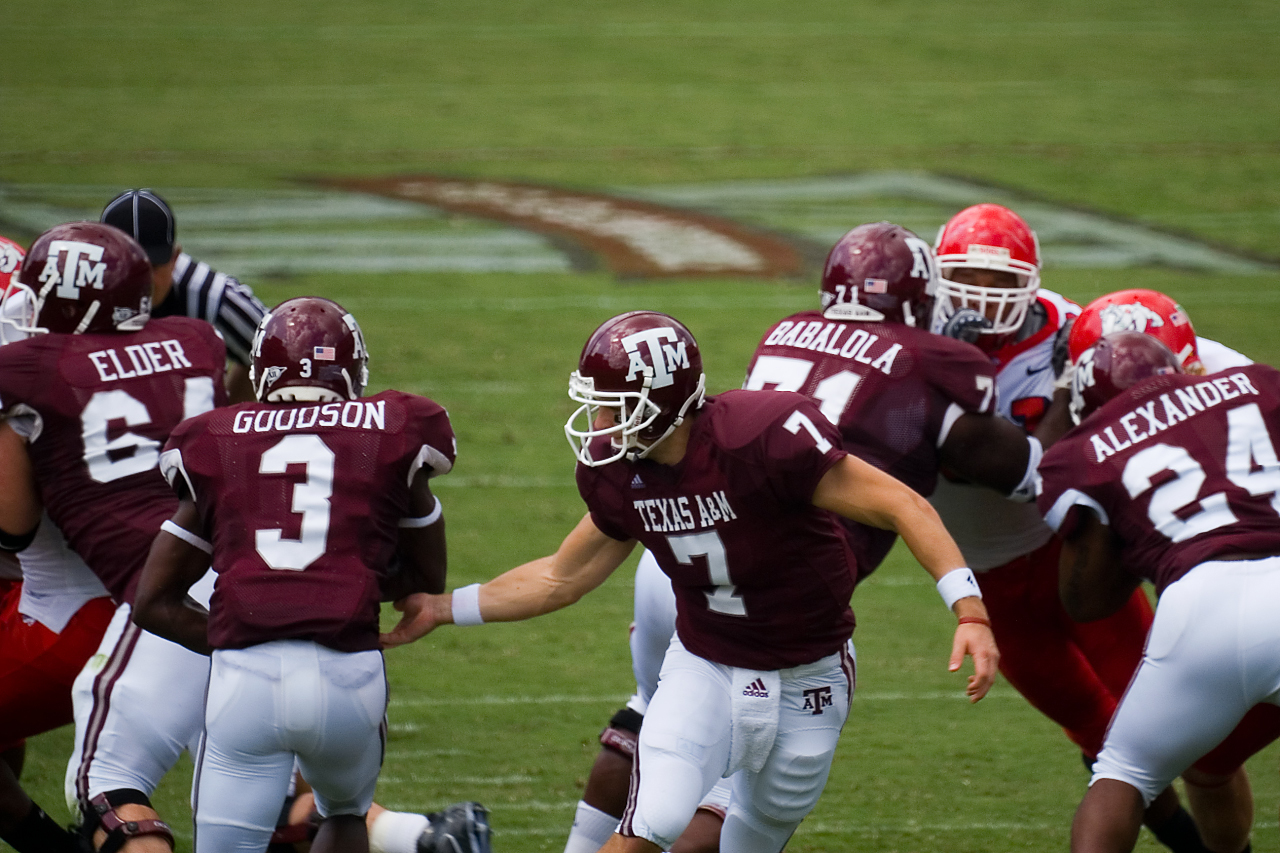
Stephen McGee hands off

	1	2	3	4	OT	2OT	3OT	Total
Bulldogs	0	0	14	15	3	7	6	45
No. 23 Aggies	7	12	3	7	3	7	8	47

This was the first-ever meeting between the Fresno State Bulldogs and the Texas A&M Aggies.

The Texas A&M Aggies defeated the Bulldogs 47–45 in triple overtime, despite being outgained 438–393. Tom Brandstater established himself in the loss, going 22–32 for 286 yards and 3 touchdowns. A&M's Jorvorskie Lane rushed for 122 yards on 23 carries, and while Fresno State put together a tremendous second half performance and took the Aggies into three overtimes they could not find the end zone for the final two-point conversion that cost them the game.

ESPN reported, "Texas A&M turned to its powerful running back to stave off Fresno State... Jorvorskie Lane rushed for two of his four touchdowns in the second and third overtimes as the 23rd-ranked Aggies beat the feisty Bulldogs 47–45 in the first three-OT game in A&M history. The 6-foot, 268-pound Lane barreled for his final touchdown from 3 yards out, then charged into the end zone again for the winning 2-point conversion on A&M's final possession."

=== At No. 19 Oregon ===
	1	2	3	4	Total
Bulldogs	6	8	0	7	21
No. 19 Ducks	21	21	0	10	52

In a game marked by an impressive performance by Duck's running back Jonathan Stewart, the Bulldogs were largely outplayed on both sides of the ball in a 21–52 loss. Fresno State put up 327 total yards of offense, compared to Oregon's 461. Oregon was able to control the run very effectively, as Fresno State was only able to run for 60 yards total in the game, compared to 307 by Oregon running backs. Fresno State was able to produce more passing yards than Oregon, with Tom Brandstater going 18 of 32 for 219, compared to Dixon's 14 of 20 for 139 yards. Jonathan Stewart's 17 touches produced 165 yards and two touchdowns, including an 88-yard run.

=== Louisiana Tech ===
	1	2	3	4	Total
Louisiana Tech Bulldogs	3	3	0	0	6
Fresno State Bulldogs	0	0	10	7	17

Fresno State trailed at halftime 6–0 before taking control in the 2nd half in a 17–6 victory in Bulldog Stadium. Running backs Lonyae Miller, Ryan Mathews, and Clifton Smith combined to rush for 139 yards with Smith producing a fourth-quarter touchdown. Louisiana Tech's quarterback Zac Champion passed for more yards than Fresno State's Tom Brandstater in the loss, going 22 of 48 with 179 yards compared to Brandstater's 8 for 22 attempts for 92 yards. The game was attended by 38,104 fans.

=== At Nevada ===
	1	2	3	4	Total
Bulldogs	14	14	14	7	49
Wolf Pack	3	10	7	21	41

Fresno State earned its second conference win and third overall by beating Nevada in Reno. Fresno State quarterback Tom Brandstater passed for 168 yards going 10 for 16 in the win, but the real star of the game was running back Ryan Mathews, who rushed for 171 yards on 14 carries with three touchdowns. Lonyae Miller ran for 95 yards on 12 carries as well. Remarkably, Nevada-Reno quarterback Colin Kaepernick, a redshirt freshman who came into the game to fill in for starter Nick Graziano, went 23 for 26 for 384 yards in the loss. The recorded attendance was 18,503.

=== At Idaho ===
	1	2	3	4	Total
Bulldogs	7	10	14	6	37
Vandals	0	7	7	10	24

Fresno State quarterback Tom Brandstater went 17 of 22 for 178 yards to secure the away win for the Bulldogs. Lonyae Miller had another 100 yard game, going 108 yards on 18 carries. Idaho's Deonte Jackson also had a big game, rushing for 111 yards on 11 carries. Fresno State only outgained Idaho 421 to 420 in total yardage, but the 4 Idaho turnovers were costly. 14,205 watched the Bulldogs extend their winning streak to 3 in the Kibbie Dome.

=== San Jose State ===
	1	2	3	4	Total
Spartans	0	0	0	0	0
Bulldogs	3	3	21	3	30

Fresno State shutout rival San Jose State in the seventy-second meeting between the two conference opponents, earning the homecoming win. Going into halftime with a 6–0 lead having benefited from two missed Spartan kicks, the Bulldogs blew the game open to start the second half, with a 61-yard kickoff return by A.J. Jefferson, and a 14-yard touchdown run by Ryan Mathews. The freshmen Mathews later had a 58-yard touchdown run in a 144-yard game. Fresno State quarterback Tom Branstater threw for 132 yards, while San Jose State quarterback Adam Trafalis passed for 354 yards, and ran for 97 more in the losing effort. The Fresno State defense was efficient in keeping the powerful San Jose State offense out of the end zone.

=== Boise State ===
	1	2	3	4	Total
Broncos	14	3	7	10	34
Bulldogs	14	0	0	7	21

=== Utah State ===
	1	2	3	4	Total
Aggies	0	7	10	10	27
Bulldogs	14	17	7	0	38

=== At No. 12 Hawaii ===
	1	2	3	4	Total
Bulldogs	7	9	0	14	30
No. 12 Warriors	24	10	0	3	37

=== Kansas State ===
	1	2	3	4	Total
Wildcats	14	7	0	8	29
Bulldogs	10	21	14	0	45

=== At New Mexico State ===
	1	2	3	4	Total
Bulldogs	6	17	7	0	30
Aggies	7	6	3	7	23

=== Vs. Georgia Tech (Humanitarian Bowl) ===
	1	2	3	4	Total
Yellow Jackets	7	0	14	7	28
Bulldogs	3	17	14	6	40

== Awards ==
- A. J. Jefferson was selected as an All-American for the All-purpose player/return specialist role.
