= 2002 Humanitarian Bowl =

6th edition of the Humanitarian Bowl

Iowa State Cyclones	Boise State Broncos
(7–6)	(11–1)
Big 12	WAC
16	34
Head coach: Dan McCarney	Head coach: Dan Hawkins
	AP / Coaches / BCS; 18 / 15 / NR
	1	2	3	4	Total
Iowa State	3	7	0	6	16
Boise State	0	7	14	13	34
- Date: December 31, 2002
- Season: 2002
- Stadium: Bronco Stadium
- Location: Boise, Idaho
- Favorite: Boise State by 12
- Referee: Ken Rivera (Mtn. West)
- Attendance: 30,446
- Payout: US$750,000 per team

United States TV coverage
- Network: ESPN
- Announcers: Dr. Jerry Punch, Randy Wright, Heather Cox

The 2002 Humanitarian Bowl was the 6th edition of the bowl game. It featured the Boise State Broncos and the Iowa State Cyclones.

Iowa State got on the board first after a 30-yard field goal from Adam Benike, taking a 3–0 lead. In the second quarter, Boise State's Brock Forsey scored from 4 yards out for Boise State to jump ahead 7–3. Iowa State quarterback Seneca Wallace threw a 6-yard touchdown pass to wide receiver Jamaul Montgomery, and Iowa State took a 10–7 lead to halftime.

In the third quarter, Brock Forsey gave Boise State the lead again, as he rumbled in from 2 yards out to place the Broncos in front 14–10. Quarterback Ryan Dinwiddie later scored on a 1-yard quarterback sneak to make it 21–10. In the fourth quarter, Brock Forsey added his third touchdown of the game, a 9 yarder, as Boise State built a 27–10 lead, and pulled away from Iowa State. Lane Danielson scored on a four-yard run making it 27–16, but Ryan Dinwiddie threw a 3-yard touchdown pass to Lou Fanucchi to cap the scoring, and give Boise State a 34–16 win.
