= 2002 UTEP Miners football team =

American college football season

2002 UTEP Miners football
- Conference: Western Athletic Conference
- Record: 2–10 (1–7 WAC)
- Head coach: Gary Nord (3rd season)
- Offensive coordinator: Patrick Higgins (3rd season)
- Defensive coordinator: Troy Reffett (1st season)
- Home stadium: Sun Bowl

2002 Western Athletic Conference football standings
	Conf.			Overall
Team	W		L	W		L
No. 15 Boise State $	8	–	0	12	–	1
Hawaii	7	–	1	10	–	4
Fresno State	6	–	2	9	–	5
San Jose State	4	–	4	6	–	7
Nevada	4	–	4	5	–	7
Rice	3	–	5	4	–	7
Louisiana Tech	3	–	5	4	–	8
SMU	3	–	5	3	–	9
UTEP	1	–	7	2	–	10
Tulsa	1	–	7	1	–	11
$ – Conference champion; Rankings from AP Poll

The 2002 UTEP Miners football team represented the University of Texas at El Paso (UTEP) as a member of the Western Athletic Conference (WAC) during the 2002 NCAA Division I-A football season. Led by third-year head coach Gary Nord, the Miners compiled an overall record of 2–10 with a mark of 1–7 in conference play, tying for ninth place at the bottom of the WAC standings. The team played home games at the Sun Bowl in El Paso, Texas.

== Schedule ==
Date	Time	Opponent	Site	TV	Result	Attendance	Source
August 31	7:05 pm	Sacramento State*	Sun Bowl; El Paso, TX		W 42–12	30,536	
September 7	11:30 am	at Kentucky*	Commonwealth Stadium; Lexington, KY		L 17–77	59,213	
September 14	6:00 pm	at Oklahoma*	Gaylord Family Oklahoma Memorial Stadium; Norman, OK	PPV	L 0–68	74,468	
September 21	7:05 pm	Hawaii	Sun Bowl; El Paso, TX		L 6–31	44,381	
September 28	8:15 pm	at San Jose State	Spartan Stadium; San Jose, CA	FSN	L 24–58	10,416	
October 5	6:00 pm	at New Mexico State*	Aggie Memorial Stadium; Las Cruces, NM (Battle of I-10)		L 14–49	30,605	
October 19	8:15 pm	Rice^{†}	Sun Bowl; El Paso, TX	FSN	W 38–35	32,392	
October 26	1:00 pm	at Tulsa	Skelly Stadium; Tulsa, OK		L 0–20	12,317	
November 2	7:05 pm	Boise State	Sun Bowl; El Paso, TX		L 3–58	21,689	
November 9	1:00 pm	at Nevada	Mackay Stadium; Reno, NV		L 17–23	13,721	
November 16	3:05 pm	SMU	Sun Bowl; El Paso, TX		L 35–42	21,765	
November 22	1:00 pm	at Louisiana Tech	Independence Stadium; Shreveport, LA		L 24–38	9,267	
*Non-conference game; ^{†}Homecoming; All times are in Mountain time
