= 2007 Idaho Vandals football team =

American college football season

2007 Idaho Vandals football
- Conference: Western Athletic Conference
- Record: 1–11 (0–8 WAC)
- Head coach: Robb Akey (1st season)
- Offensive coordinator: Steve Axman (1st season)
- Offensive scheme: Spread
- Defensive coordinator: Mark Criner (1st season)
- Base defense: 4–3
- Home stadium: Kibbie Dome

2007 Western Athletic Conference football standings
	Conf.			Overall
Team	W		L	W		L
No. 19 Hawaii $	8	–	0	12	–	1
Boise State	7	–	1	10	–	3
Fresno State	6	–	2	9	–	4
Nevada	4	–	4	6	–	7
Louisiana Tech	4	–	4	5	–	7
San Jose State	4	–	4	5	–	7
Utah State	2	–	6	2	–	10
New Mexico State	1	–	7	4	–	9
Idaho	0	–	8	1	–	11
$ – Conference champion and BCS representative as top non-AQ school to meet automatic qualification criteria; Rankings from AP Poll

The 2007 Idaho Vandals football team represented the University of Idaho during the 2007 NCAA Division I FBS football season. Idaho competed as a member of the Western Athletic Conference (WAC), and played their home games on campus in the Kibbie Dome. The Vandals were led by first-year head coach Robb Akey, hired following the departure of Dennis Erickson for Arizona State in December 2006.

The Vandals were winless in eight conference games and went 1–11 overall, which was Idaho's eighth consecutive season with a losing record. The sole victory came in early September against Cal Poly, an FCS program.

Akey was previously the defensive coordinator at Washington State University in neighboring Pullman.

== Schedule ==
Date	Time	Opponent	Site	TV	Result	Attendance
September 1	7:15 pm	at No. 1 USC*	Los Angeles Memorial Coliseum; Los Angeles, CA	FSN	L 10–38	90,917
September 8	2:00 pm	Cal Poly*	Kibbie Dome; Moscow, ID		W 20–13	9,820
September 15	7:00 pm	at Washington State*	Martin Stadium; Pullman, WA	FSN	L 28–45	32,064
September 22	2:00 pm	Northern Illinois*	Kibbie Dome; Moscow, ID		L 35–42	12,461
September 29	2:00 pm	No. 17 Hawaii	Kibbie Dome; Moscow, ID		L 20–48	13,807
October 6	1:00 pm	at San Jose State	Spartan Stadium; San Jose, CA		L 20–28	16,289
October 13	2:00 pm	Fresno State^{†}	Kibbie Dome; Moscow, ID	ALT	L 24–37	14,205
October 20	5:00 pm	at New Mexico State	Aggie Memorial Stadium; Las Cruces, NM		L 31–45	15,788
October 27	1:00 pm	at Nevada	Mackay Stadium; Reno, NV		L 21–37	11,960
November 3	2:00 pm	Louisiana Tech	Kibbie Dome; Moscow, ID		L 16–28	10,479
November 17	12:00 pm	at No. 15 Boise State	Bronco Stadium; Boise, ID (rivalry)	KTVB	L 14–58	30,681
November 24	2:00 pm	Utah State	Kibbie Dome; Moscow, ID	ALT	L 19–24	8,102
*Non-conference game; ^{†}Homecoming; Rankings from AP Poll released prior to the game

Idaho's home attendance for 2007 was 68,874 for six games, an average of 11,479.
The maximum was 14,205 for the Fresno State game on October 13,
the minimum was 8,102 for the Utah State game on November 24, two days after Thanksgiving.

== NFL draft ==
One Vandal was selected in the 2008 NFL draft; linebacker David Vobora was the final pick and the draft's Mr. Irrelevant.
This ended a three-year drought in the NFL Draft for Idaho. The last Vandal selection was guard Jake Scott, four years earlier in 2004.

Player	Position	Round	Overall	Franchise
David Vobora	LB	7th	252	St. Louis Rams
