= 2002 Boise State Broncos football team =

American college football season

2002 Boise State Broncos football

WAC champion Humanitarian Bowl champion

Humanitarian Bowl, W 34–16 vs Iowa State
- Conference: Western Athletic Conference

Ranking
- Coaches: No. 12
- AP: No. 15
- Record: 12–1 (8–0 WAC)
- Head coach: Dan Hawkins (2nd season)
- Offensive coordinator: Chris Petersen (2nd season)
- Defensive coordinator: Ron Collins
- Home stadium: Bronco Stadium

2002 Western Athletic Conference football standings
| | Conf. | | | Overall |
| Team | W | | L | W | | L |
|---|---|---|---|---|---|---|
| No. 15 Boise State $ | 8 | – | 0 | 12 | – | 1 |
| Hawaii | 7 | – | 1 | 10 | – | 4 |
| Fresno State | 6 | – | 2 | 9 | – | 5 |
| San Jose State | 4 | – | 4 | 6 | – | 7 |
| Nevada | 4 | – | 4 | 5 | – | 7 |
| Rice | 3 | – | 5 | 4 | – | 7 |
| Louisiana Tech | 3 | – | 5 | 4 | – | 8 |
| SMU | 3 | – | 5 | 3 | – | 9 |
| UTEP | 1 | – | 7 | 2 | – | 10 |
| Tulsa | 1 | – | 7 | 1 | – | 11 |
$ – Conference champion; Rankings from AP Poll

The 2002 Boise State Broncos football team represented Boise State University in the 2002 NCAA Division I-A football season. Boise State competed as a member of the Western Athletic Conference (WAC), and played their home games at Bronco Stadium in Boise, Idaho. The Broncos were led by second-year head coach Dan Hawkins. The Broncos finished the season 12–1 and 8–0 in conference to win their first WAC title. They played in the Humanitarian Bowl, where they defeated Iowa State, 34–16. The 2002 marked the first season that Boise State was ranked in the top 25 since moving to Division I-A in 1996.

== Schedule ==
| Date | Time | Opponent | Rank | Site | TV | Result | Attendance |
|---|---|---|---|---|---|---|---|
| August 31 | 6:05 pm | Idaho* | | Bronco Stadium; Boise, ID (Battle for the Governor's Trophy) | | W 38–21 | 30,878 |
| September 7 | 5:00 pm | at Arkansas* | | Donald W. Reynolds Razorback Stadium; Fayetteville, AR | KBCI-TV | L 14–41 | 70,142 |
| September 14 | 2:00 pm | at Wyoming* | | War Memorial Stadium; Laramie, WY | KBCI-TV | W 35–13 | 16,256 |
| September 28 | 6:05 pm | Utah State* | | Bronco Stadium; Boise, ID | | W 63–38 | 25,161 |
| October 5 | 6:05 pm | Hawaii^{†} | | Bronco Stadium; Boise, ID | | W 58–31 | 25,857 |
| October 12 | 5:00 pm | at Tulsa | | Skelly Stadium; Tulsa, OK | SPW | W 52–24 | 15,079 |
| October 18 | 6:05 pm | Fresno State | | Bronco Stadium; Boise, ID (rivalry) | ESPN | W 67–21 | 30,924 |
| October 26 | 3:00 pm | at San Jose State | | Spartan Statdium; San Jose, CA | KBCI-TV | W 45–8 | 10,497 |
| November 2 | 7:05 pm | at UTEP | | Sun Bowl; El Paso, TX | KBCI-TV | W 58–3 | 21,689 |
| November 9 | 1:05 pm | Rice | | Bronco Stadium; Boise, ID | | W 49–7 | 23,962 |
| November 16 | 1:05 pm | Louisiana Tech | | Bronco Stadium; Boise, ID | | W 36–10 | 28,413 |
| November 23 | 1:05 pm | at Nevada | No. 23 | Mackay Stadium; Reno, NV (rivalry) | KBCI-TV | W 44–7 | 20,247 |
| December 31 | 11:00 am | Iowa State* | No. 18 | Bronco Stadium; Boise, ID (Humanitarian Bowl) | ESPN | W 34–16 | 30,446 |
*Non-conference game; ^{†}Homecoming; Rankings from AP Poll released prior to the game; All times are in Mountain time

== Roster ==
2002 Boise State Broncos football team roster
Players
Coaches
Offense

| Pos. | # | Name | Class |
|---|---|---|---|
| WR | 89 | T. J. Acree | So |
| G | 70 | Michael Ansel | So |
| TE | 86 | Rocky Atkinson | Sr |

Defense

| Pos. | # | Name | Class |
|---|---|---|---|
| LB | 55 | Chauncey Ako | Sr |
| CB | 18 | Gerald Alexander | Fr |
| DT | 90 | Paul Allen | Jr |
| CB | 31 | Brad Allen | Fr |
| DT | 51 | Tony Altieri | Sr |
| LB | 52 | Jared Aurich | So |
| LB | 40 | Andy Avalos | So |

Special teams

| Pos. | # | Name | Class |

Head coach

- Dan Hawkins

Coordinators/assistant coaches

Legend

- (C) Team captain
- (S) Suspended
- (I) Ineligible
- Injured
- Redshirt

Roster
Last update: 2002-12-01
