= Glenell Sanders =

American football player (born 1966)

No. 64, 55, 58
- Position: Linebacker

Personal information
- Born: November 4, 1966 (age 60); New Orleans, Louisiana, U.S.
- Listed height: 6 ft 1 in (1.85 m)
- Listed weight: 240 lb (109 kg)

Career information
- High school: Clinton (LA)
- College: Louisiana Tech
- NFL draft: 1990: undrafted

Career history
- Chicago Bears (1990); Los Angeles Rams (1991); Buffalo Bills (1993)*; Denver Broncos (1994); Indianapolis Colts (1995)
- * Offseason or practice squad member only

Career NFL statistics
- Tackles: 26
- Fumble recoveries: 1
- Stats at Pro Football Reference

Glenell Sanders (born November 4, 1966) is an American former professional football player who was a linebacker in the National Football League (NFL). He played college football for the Louisiana Tech Bulldogs. He played in the NFL for the Chicago Bears in 1990, Los Angeles Rams in 1991, Denver Broncos in 1994 and Indianapolis Colts in 1995. 1989 First Team All-South independent football
