= 2002 Louisiana Tech Bulldogs football team =

American college football season

2002 Louisiana Tech Bulldogs football
- Conference: Western Athletic Conference
- Record: 4–8 (3–5 WAC)
- Head coach: Jack Bicknell Jr. (4th season)
- Offensive coordinator: Conroy Hines (3rd season)
- Co-defensive coordinators: Rick Smith (1st season); Randy Bates (1st season)
- Captain: None
- Home stadium: Joe Aillet Stadium; Independence Stadium

2002 Western Athletic Conference football standings
	Conf.			Overall
Team	W		L	W		L
No. 15 Boise State $	8	–	0	12	–	1
Hawaii	7	–	1	10	–	4
Fresno State	6	–	2	9	–	5
San Jose State	4	–	4	6	–	7
Nevada	4	–	4	5	–	7
Rice	3	–	5	4	–	7
Louisiana Tech	3	–	5	4	–	8
SMU	3	–	5	3	–	9
UTEP	1	–	7	2	–	10
Tulsa	1	–	7	1	–	11
$ – Conference champion; Rankings from AP Poll

The 2002 Louisiana Tech Bulldogs football team represented Louisiana Tech University as a member of the Western Athletic Conference (WAC) during the 2002 NCAA Division I-A football season. Led by fourth-year head coach Jack Bicknell Jr., the Bulldogs played their home games at Joe Aillet Stadium in Ruston, Louisiana and Independence Stadium in Shreveport, Louisiana. Louisiana Tech finished the season with a record of 4–8 overall and a mark of 3–5 in conference play, tying for sixth place in the WAC.

== Schedule ==
Date	Time	Opponent	Site	TV	Result	Attendance
August 31	7:00 pm	Oklahoma State*	Independence Stadium; Shreveport, LA		W 39–36	31,391
September 7	12:00 pm	at Clemson*	Memorial Stadium; Clemson, SC		L 13–33	72,616
September 14	1:00 pm	Tulsa	Joe Aillet Stadium; Ruston, LA	FSN	W 53–9	18,600
September 21	11:00 am	at No. 15 Penn State*	Beaver Stadium; University Park, PA	ESPN Plus	L 17–49	103,987
September 28	6:00 pm	at No. 24 Texas A&M*	Kyle Field; College Station, TX		L 3–31	72,802
October 5	7:00 pm	at Rice	Reliant Stadium; Houston, TX		L 20–37	20,895
October 19	2:00 pm	at SMU	Gerald J. Ford Stadium; Dallas, TX		L 34–37	14,836
October 26	2:00 pm	Nevada	Joe Aillet Stadium; Ruston, LA		W 50–47	15,315
November 9	4:00 pm	at San Jose State	Spartan Stadium; San Jose, CA		L 30–42	6,391
November 16	2:05 pm	at Boise State	Bronco Stadium; Boise, ID		L 10–36	28,413
November 23	2:00 pm	UTEP	Independence Stadium; Shreveport, LA		W 38–24	9,267
December 5	6:00 pm	Fresno State	Joe Aillet Stadium; Ruston, LA	ESPN2	L 13–45	17,810
*Non-conference game; Rankings from AP Poll released prior to the game; All times are in Central time

== Roster ==
2002 Louisiana Tech Bulldogs football team roster
Players
Coaches
Offense

Pos.	#	Name	Class
QB	11	Luke McCown	Jr
WR	33	Sam Washington	Jr

Defense

Pos.	#	Name	Class
CB	1	Corey Brazil	So
CB	18	Delone Williams	Fr
DB	39	Orlandus Williams	Fr
CB	22	Tramon Williams	Fr
CB	24	Jerron Wishom	So
DL	48	Spencer Young	Fr

Special teams

Pos.	#	Name	Class
K	23	Josh Scobee	Jr

Head coach

- Jack Bicknell, Jr.

Coordinators/assistant coaches

Legend

- (C) Team captain
- (S) Suspended
- (I) Ineligible
- Injured
- Redshirt

Roster
Last update: 2002-10-16
