= Houston Bates =

American football player (born 1991)

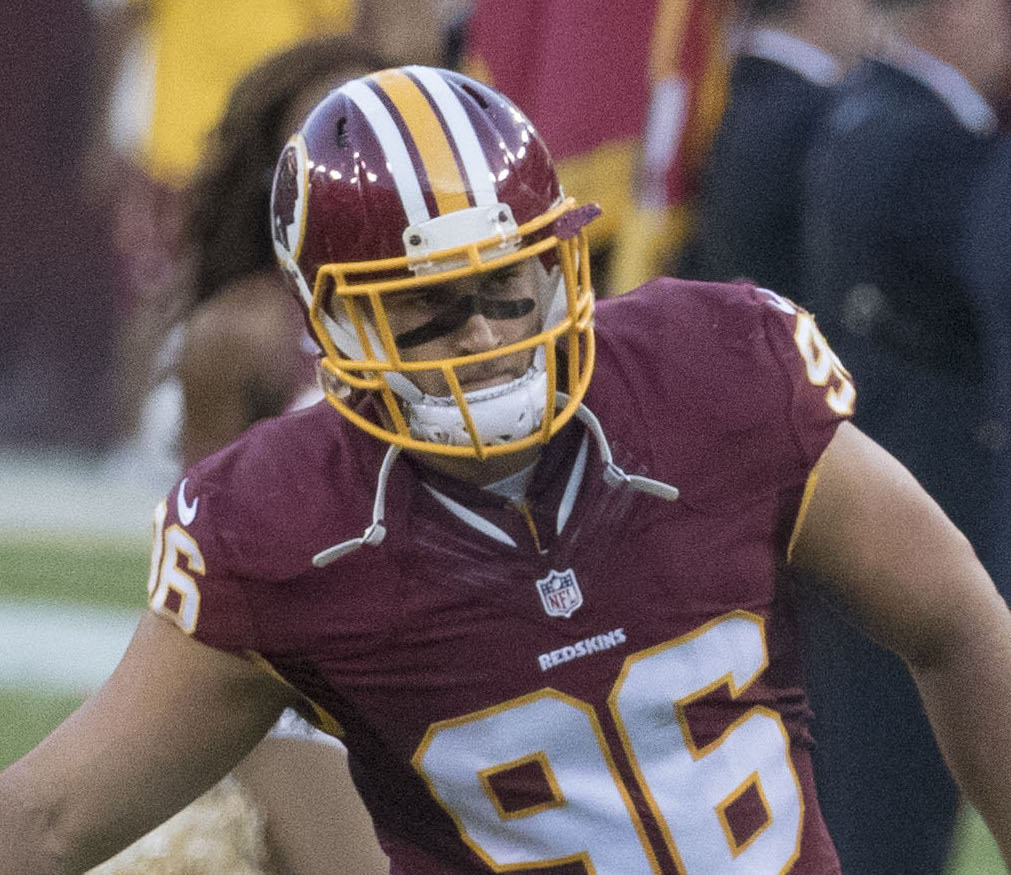
- Bates with the Washington Redskins in 2016

Profile
- Position: Linebacker

Personal information
- Born: December 20, 1991 (age 34); Pineville, Louisiana, U.S.
- Listed height: 6 ft 3 in (1.91 m)
- Listed weight: 240 lb (109 kg)

Career information
- High school: St. Paul's (Covington, Louisiana)
- College: Illinois; Louisiana Tech
- NFL draft: 2015: undrafted

Career history
- Washington Redskins (2015–2016)

Career NFL statistics
- Games played: 24
- Tackles: 17
- Quarterback sacks: 0.0
- Forced fumbles: 0
- Safety: 1
- Stats at Pro Football Reference

William Houston Bates (born December 20, 1991) is an American former professional football player who was an outside linebacker for the Washington Redskins of the National Football League (NFL). He played college football for the Illinois Fighting Illini and Louisiana Tech Bulldogs as a defensive end. He signed with the Redskins as an undrafted free agent in 2015.

== Professional career ==
After a try-out, Bates signed with the Washington Redskins on May 18, 2015. Despite having a considerably strong preseason performance, he was waived on September 5 for final roster cuts before the start of the regular season. He signed to the team's practice squad the next day. On September 12, the Redskins promoted Bates to the active roster, but was waived on September 14. He re-signed with the team's practice squad on September 16. He was promoted again to the active roster on November 7 after Jackson Jeffcoat was placed on the team's injured reserve.

On December 20, 2016, Bates was placed on the team's injured reserve after tearing his ACL the day before during a game against the Carolina Panthers. He was waived following a failed physical on July 27, 2017.
