= Waylon Prather =

American football player and coach (born 1985)

Profile
- Position: Punter

Personal information
- Born: February 16, 1985 (age 41); Felton, California, U.S.
- Listed height: 6 ft 3 in (1.91 m)
- Listed weight: 225 lb (102 kg)

Career information
- High school: San Lorenzo Valley (Felton, California)
- College: San Jose State
- NFL draft: 2008: undrafted

Career history

Playing
- New Orleans Saints (2008)*; New York Jets (2008)*; Arizona Cardinals (2009)*
- * Offseason or practice squad member only

Coaching
- Cabrillo (2012–2013) Wide receivers and tight ends coach; Harbor HS (CA) (2014–2015) Head coach

Awards and highlights
- New Mexico Bowl champion (2006); First-team All-WAC (2006)

Waylon Glenn Prather (born February 16, 1985) is an American football coach and former punter who coached wide receivers and tight ends coach at Cabrillo College and was the head coach at Harbor High School. He played college football at San Jose State and was signed by the New Orleans Saints as an undrafted free agent in 2008.

Prather has also been a member of the New York Jets.

== Early life and college ==
Born in Felton, California, Prather graduated from San Lorenzo Valley High School in Felton in 2003. Prather redshirted 2003 and punted for the San Jose State Spartans football team from 2004 to 2007 and was part of the 2006 New Mexico Bowl championship team. He was a Western Athletic Conference Special Teams Player of the Week in 2005 and first-team All-WAC pick in 2006. Prather majored in kinesiology in San Jose State University and was a middle school student teacher in the spring of 2007 Prather graduated from San Jose State with a Bachelor of Science degree in kinesiology in May 2008.

== Professional career ==
=== New Orleans Saints ===
Prather was signed by the Saints as an undrafted free agent on May 5, 2008, but was waived by the team on August 25.

=== New York Jets ===
Prather was signed to the Jets' practice squad on September 17, 2008. He was released a week later on September 24.

=== Arizona Cardinals ===
Prather was signed to a future contract by the Arizona Cardinals on December 30, 2008.

== Coaching and teaching career ==
Prather became a personal trainer with LA Fitness and lived in San Diego County, California. He then moved to Santa Cruz County and began substitute teaching.

In 2012, Prather became wide receivers and tight ends coach at Cabrillo College, a junior college in Aptos, California.

Prather is now a physical education teacher at College Connection Academy in San Jose teaching 7th graders and 8th graders only.
