= Jack Bicknell Jr. =

American football player and coach (born 1963)

Current position
- Title: Offensive line coach
- Team: Sam Houston
- Conference: Conference USA

Biographical details
- Born: February 7, 1963 (age 63); North Plainfield, New Jersey, U.S.

Playing career
- 1981–1985: Boston College
- Position: Center

Coaching career (HC unless noted)
- 1986: Boston College (GA)
- 1987–1992: New Hampshire (DL)
- 1993–1996: New Hampshire (OL)
- 1997–1998: Louisiana Tech (OL)
- 1999–2006: Louisiana Tech
- 2007–2008: Boston College (OL)
- 2009–2011: New York Giants (assistant OL)
- 2012: Kansas City Chiefs (OL)
- 2013: Pittsburgh Steelers (OL)
- 2014–2015: Miami Dolphins (assistant OL)
- 2017–2019: Ole Miss (OL)
- 2020: Auburn (OL)
- 2021: Louisville (OL)
- 2022: North Carolina (OL)
- 2023–2024: Wisconsin (OL)
- 2025: West Virginia (OL)
- 2026–present: Sam Houston (OL)

Head coaching record
- Overall: 43–52
- Bowls: 0–1

Accomplishments and honors

Awards
- Scanlan Award (1985); WAC Coach of the Year (2001)

Jack Bicknell Jr. (born February 7, 1963) is an American football coach who is currently the offensive line coach at Sam Houston State University. He was the head football coach at Louisiana Tech University from 1999 to 2006, compiling a record of 43–52 in eight seasons.

== Career ==
=== Boston College ===
On December 12, 2007, Bicknell was hired by Texas Tech to serve as their offensive line coach. However, when Boston College offensive line coach Jim Turner resigned that August, Bicknell left the Red Raiders to rejoin Boston College.

In 2007, Boston College's offensive line ranked first in the ACC in sacks against, allowing just 22 sacks all season. His offensive line also paved the way for an ACC-leading 5,951 yards of total offense and a record breaking season by quarterback Matt Ryan. Bicknell also oversaw the development of Anthony Castonzo, the first true freshman to start on the Boston College offensive line since 1997 and a member of the All-ACC freshman team.

=== NFL ===
He served as the assistant offensive line coach for the New York Giants of the National Football League (NFL) in January 2008. Bicknell spent the 2013 season as offensive line coach for the NFL's Pittsburgh Steelers before being fired on January 3, 2014. He worked as an assistant coach with the Miami Dolphins in 2014 and 2015.

=== Return to college coaching ===
He then returned to the college ranks, coaching at Ole Miss from 2017 to 2019, Auburn in 2020, Louisville in 2021, North Carolina in 2022, and is currently coaching offensive line at Wisconsin. Bicknell is the son of former Boston College head coach Jack Bicknell and the older brother of Bob Bicknell, who was most recently wide receivers coach for the Cincinnati Bengals and the senior offensive assistant for the New Orleans Saints.

== Head coaching record ==
| Year | Team | Overall | Conference | Standing | Bowl/playoffs |
|---|---|---|---|---|---|
Louisiana Tech Bulldogs (NCAA Division I-A independent) (1999–2000)
| 1999 | Louisiana Tech | 8–3 | | | |
| 2000 | Louisiana Tech | 3–9 | | | |
Louisiana Tech Bulldogs (Western Athletic Conference) (2001–2006)
| 2001 | Louisiana Tech | 7–5 | 7–1 | 1st | L Humanitarian |
| 2002 | Louisiana Tech | 4–8 | 3–5 | T–6th | |
| 2003 | Louisiana Tech | 5–7 | 3–5 | 7th | |
| 2004 | Louisiana Tech | 6–6 | 5–3 | T–3rd | |
| 2005 | Louisiana Tech | 7–4 | 6–2 | T–3rd | |
| 2006 | Louisiana Tech | 3–10 | 1–7 | T–8th | |
| Louisiana Tech: | | 43–52 | | | |
| Total: | | 43–52 | | | |
National championship Conference title Conference division title or championship game berth
