= Derrick Douglas =

American football player (born 1968)

No. 27
- Position: Running back

Personal information
- Born: August 10, 1968 (age 58); Shreveport, Louisiana, U.S.
- Listed height: 5 ft 10 in (1.78 m)
- Listed weight: 220 lb (100 kg)

Career information
- High school: Captain Shreve
- College: Louisiana Tech
- NFL draft: 1990: 6th round, 141st overall pick

Career history
- Tampa Bay Buccaneers (1990); Green Bay Packers (1991)*; Cleveland Browns (1991–1992)
- * Offseason or practice squad member only

Career NFL statistics
- Games played: 2
- Stats at Pro Football Reference

Derrick Dewayne Douglas (born August 10, 1968) is an American former professional football player who was a running back for two seasons in the National Football League (NFL). He played college football for the Louisiana Tech Bulldogs and was selected by the Tampa Bay Buccaneers in the sixth round of the 1990 NFL draft.

== College career ==
Douglas played at Louisiana Tech University for four seasons, from 1986 to 1989. In his junior and senior seasons, Douglas saw significant playing time at running back. In 1988, as a junior, Douglas also saw action as a kick returner for the Bulldogs. In 1989, after rushing for 1,232 yards and 11 touchdowns in his senior season, Douglas was named a 1st team all South-Independent, and an honorable mention All-American. Douglas is tenth all-time in rushing yards and fifth all-time in single season rushing yards for Louisiana Tech.

=== College statistics ===
Season	Team	GP	Rushing				Receiving		
Season	Team	GP	Att	Yds	Avg	TD	Rec	Yds	TD
1988	Louisiana Tech	11	133	602	4.5	3	28	309	3
1989	Louisiana Tech	10	281	1,232	4.4	11	13	134	2
Totals		21	414	1,834	4.4	14	41	443	5

== Professional career ==
Douglas was selected in the sixth round by the Tampa Bay Buccaneers in the 1990 NFL draft, but did not see the field in his one season with the team. The following season, Douglas played in two games for the Cleveland Browns, though he failed to record a statistic.
