= Tommy Spinks =

American football player (1948–2007)

Profile
- Position: Wide receiver

Personal information
- Born: October 29, 1948; Shreveport, Louisiana, U.S.
- Died: August 26, 2007 (aged 58); Arlington, Texas, U.S.

Career information
- College: Louisiana Tech Bulldogs
- NFL draft: 1970: 14th round, 363rd overall pick

Career history
- 1970: Minnesota Vikings

Thomas Allen Spinks, known as Tommy Spinks (October 29, 1948 – August 26, 2007), was an American football wide receiver. He played college football for the Louisiana Tech Bulldogs.

Spinks set two records in the 1968 Grantland Rice Bowl, when he caught 12 passes for 167 yards. After his Tech career, Spinks was selected in the 1970 NFL draft by the Minnesota Vikings, but never played in an NFL game. Spinks was inducted into the Louisiana Tech University Athletic Hall of Fame in 1988.
