= Carlos Henderson =

American football player (born 1994)

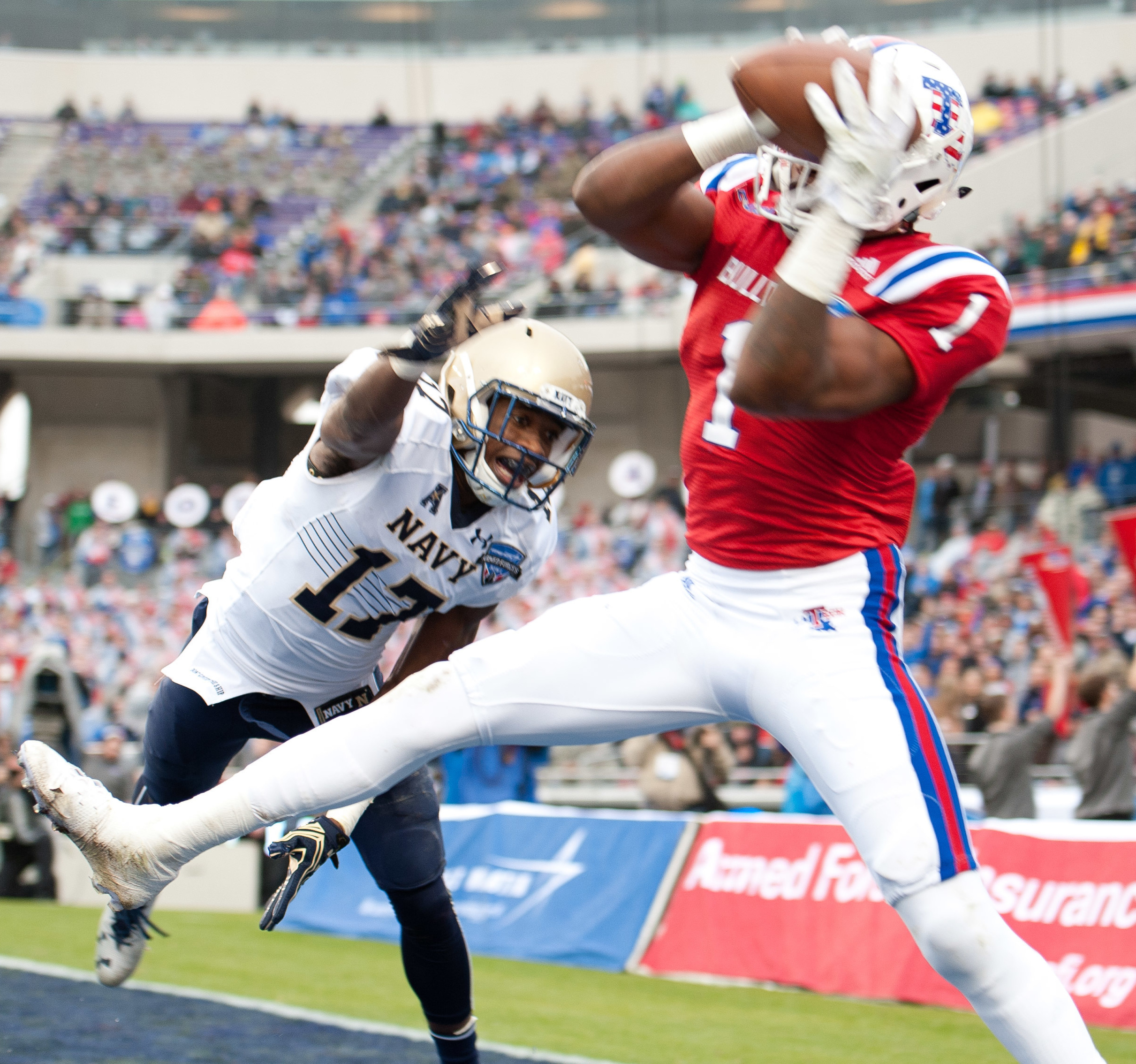
- Henderson with Louisiana Tech in the 2016 Armed Forces Bowl

No. 11, 80
- Position: Wide receiver

Personal information
- Born: December 19, 1994 (age 31); New Orleans, Louisiana, U.S.
- Listed height: 5 ft 11 in (1.80 m)
- Listed weight: 199 lb (90 kg)

Career information
- High school: McDonogh 35 (New Orleans)
- College: Louisiana Tech
- NFL draft: 2017: 3rd round, 82nd overall pick

Career history
- Denver Broncos (2017); Washington Redskins (2018–2019)*; Saskatchewan Roughriders (2019); Birmingham Stallions (2022)*
- * Offseason or practice squad member only

Awards and highlights
- First-team All-C-USA WR & KR (2016); C-USA Offensive Player of the Year (2016); C-USA Special Teams Player of the Year (2016)

Career CFL statistics
- Receptions: 1
- Receiving yards: 15
- Stats at CFL.ca
- Stats at Pro Football Reference

Carlos Henderson (born December 19, 1994) is an American former professional football wide receiver. He played college football for the Louisiana Tech Bulldogs, and was selected by the Denver Broncos in the third round of the 2017 NFL draft.

== Early life ==
Henderson attended McDonogh 35 High School in New Orleans, Louisiana. He committed to Louisiana Tech University to play college football.

== College career ==
Henderson played at Louisiana Tech from 2013 to 2016. As a junior, he was named the Conference USA (C-USA) Offensive Player of the Year and Special Teams Player of the Year. He had 82 receptions for 1,535 yards and 19 touchdowns on offense and 805 kick return yards and two touchdowns. During his career, he had 147 receptions for 2,878 yards and 28 touchdowns. He was named honorable mention All-C-USA kick returner for the 2014 and 2015 seasons.

On December 26, 2016, Henderson announced on his Instagram that he would forgo his senior season and enter the 2017 NFL draft.

== Professional career ==
=== Pre-draft ===
Henderson was one of 59 collegiate wide receivers to attend the NFL Scouting Combine in Indianapolis, Indiana. He performed all of the combine drills and finished 15th among his position group in the 40-yard dash. He also finished seventh in the broad jump and tied for ninth among wide receivers in the vertical jump. On March 21, 2017, he attended Louisiana's Tech pro day, along with Trent Taylor, Xavier Woods, Chad Williams, and 13 other prospects. Henderson opted to only run positional drills and had only one drop as scouts and team representatives from all 32 NFL teams attended. At the conclusion of the pre-draft process, Henderson was projected to be a third or fourth round pick by NFL draft experts and scouts. He was ranked the 13th best wide receiver in the draft by NFLDraftScout.com.

Pre-draft measurables
Height	Weight	Arm length	Hand span	40-yard dash	10-yard split	20-yard split	20-yard shuttle	Three-cone drill	Vertical jump	Broad jump	Bench press
5 ft 11 in (1.80 m)	199 lb (90 kg)	31 3/8 in (0.80 m)	9 1/8 in (0.23 m)	4.46 s	1.51 s	2.61 s	4.35 s	7.18 s	36 in (0.91 m)	10 ft 11 in (3.33 m)	13 reps
All values from NFL Combine

=== Denver Broncos ===
The Denver Broncos selected Henderson in the third round (82nd overall) of the 2017 NFL Draft. He was the tenth wide receiver selected in 2017. He was the first of three Louisiana Tech players selected, along with wide receiver Trent Taylor and safety Xavier Woods. On May 26, 2017, the Broncos signed Henderson to a four-year, $3.32 million contract that includes a signing bonus of $817,984. On August 13, he underwent surgery to repair a torn ligament in his left thumb. On September 2, the Broncos placed Henderson on injured reserve due to his thumb injury.

In 2018, Henderson opened up training camp on the "did not report" list as he was dealing with a "personal matter". On August 15, 2018, he was suspended one game for violating the NFL's substance abuse policy. He was waived by Denver on September 1, and was re–signed to the practice squad the next day. Henderson was released by the Broncos on September 13.

=== Washington Redskins ===
Henderson signed with the practice squad of the Washington Redskins on December 26, 2018. He signed a reserve/future contract with the Redskins on December 31. The Redskins waived Henderson on January 7, 2019.

=== Saskatchewan Roughriders ===
Henderson signed a contract extension through the 2022 season with the Saskatchewan Roughriders of the Canadian Football League on January 6, 2021. He was released by the Roughriders on July 30.

=== Birmingham Stallions ===
Henderson signed with the Birmingham Stallions of the United States Football League on May 27, 2022. He was subsequently transferred to the team's inactive roster and the team released him on June 1.
