= Johnny Robinson (defensive tackle) =

American football player (born 1959)

No. 68
- Position: Defensive tackle

Personal information
- Born: February 14, 1959 (age 67); Jonesboro, Louisiana, U.S.
- Listed height: 6 ft 2 in (1.88 m)
- Listed weight: 260 lb (118 kg)

Career information
- High school: Ruston (Ruston, Louisiana)
- College: Louisiana Tech
- NFL draft: 1981: 4th round, 111th overall pick

Career history
- Oakland/Los Angeles Raiders (1981–1983)

Awards and highlights
- Super Bowl champion (XVIII); PFWA All-Rookie Team (1981)

Career NFL statistics
- Sacks: 4
- Fumble recoveries: 1
- Safeties: 1
- Stats at Pro Football Reference

Johnny Dean Robinson (born February 14, 1959) is an American former professional football player who a defensive tackle for the Oakland / Los Angeles Raiders of the National Football League (NFL). He attended Louisiana Tech University.
