= Doug Landry =

American football player (1964–2015)

No. 39, 38
- Position: Linebacker

Personal information
- Born: April 21, 1964; New Orleans, Louisiana, U.S.
- Died: June 8, 2015 (aged 51)
- Listed height: 6 ft 2 in (1.88 m)
- Listed weight: 225 lb (102 kg)

Career information
- High school: St. Augustine (New Orleans)
- College: Louisiana Tech
- NFL draft: 1986: 5th round, 118th overall pick

Career history
- San Diego Chargers (1986)*; Cincinnati Bengals (1986)*; Hamilton Tiger-Cats (1987); Toronto Argonauts (1987―1988); Calgary Stampeders (1988―1989); New Orleans Saints (1990)*; BC Lions (1990); Tampa Bay Storm (1992)
- * Offseason or practice squad member only

Career CFL statistics
- Games played: 56
- Tackles: 306
- Sacks: 10
- Interceptions: 14
- Fumble recoveries: 1

Career AFL statistics
- Tackles / Sacks: 15 / 1
- Interceptions: 1
- Carries / Yards: 29 / 99
- Receptions / Yards: 1 / 7
- Touchdowns: 3
- Stats at ArenaFan.com

Douglas James "Tank" Landry, Jr. (April 21, 1964 – June 8, 2015) was an American professional football linebacker. He was selected by the San Diego Chargers in the fifth round (118th overall) of the 1986 NFL draft. He played college football at Louisiana Tech.

He was also a member of the Cincinnati Bengals, and New Orleans Saints of the National Football League (NFL), the Hamilton Tiger-Cats, Toronto Argonauts, Calgary Stampeders, and BC Lions of the Canadian Football League (CFL), as well as the Tampa Bay Storm of the Arena Football League (AFL).

== Early life ==
Douglas James Landry, Jr. was born on April 21, 1964 to his parents Douglas James Landry and Connie Dunbar Landry. He attended St. Augustine High School where he won the 1979 state championship. He then attended Louisiana Tech, where he was an All-American linebacker.

== Professional career ==
Landry was selected by the San Diego Chargers in the fifth round (118th overall) of the 1986 NFL draft. On July 11, 1986 he was released due to a failed physical. On July 24, he was signed by the Cincinnati Bengals, but released during final cuts on September 1 when they signed Joe Kelly and Kiki DeAyala.

On December 5, 1986, he was signed by the Hamilton Tiger-Cats of the Canadian Football League (CFL). For the 1987 season, he appeared in one game for the Tiger-Cats recording three tackles. On July 15, 1987, he was released by the Tiger-Cats. On September 4, he was signed by the Toronto Argonauts and appeared in nine games, recording 47 tackles, three sacks, and three interceptions.

In 1988, Landry appeared in nine games for the Argonauts, recording 49 tackles, and five interceptions. On September 22, he was traded to the Calgary Stampeders where he appeared in six games. With the Stampeders he recorded 33 tackles, and one interception. In 1989, he appeared in all 18 games for the Stampeders. He recorded (a team leading) 122 tackles, two sacks, and three interceptions.

On February 20, 1990 Landry signed with the New Orleans Saints. On June 7, 1990 he was released by the Saints.

He then returned the Canadian Football League by signing with the BC Lions where he appeared in 13 games. For the 1990 season, he recorded 52 tackles, five sacks, two interceptions, and one fumble recovery.

After not playing in 1991, Landry signed with the Tampa Bay Storm of the Arena Football League (AFL). In his lone arena football season, he recorded 15 tackles, one sack, and one interception as a linebacker. As a running back, he recorded 29 carries for 99 yards, three touchdowns, and one reception for seven yards. On May 11, 1993, he was placed on injured reserve with a torn knee ligament.

== Personal life ==
Landry was given the nickname "Tank" by his grandmother Edna just after he was born due to his size, 10 pounds 11 ounces.

He was married to his wife Patrina Fontenette-Landry. The coupled had two sons.

In 1991, while not playing football, Landry was working as a railroad machine operator in North Dakota.
