= Nevada Wolf Pack football statistical leaders =

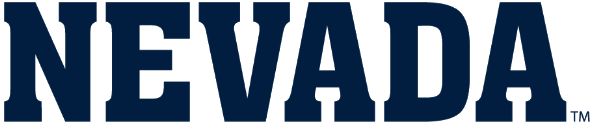

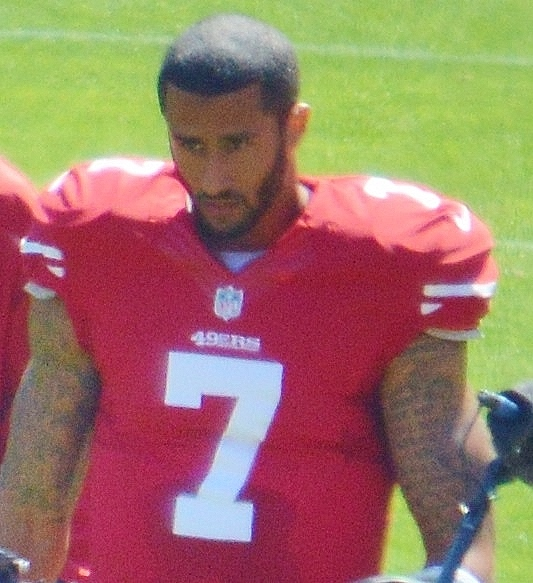
Colin Kaepernick holds Wolf Pack career records in passing touchdowns, rushing touchdowns, and total offense yards.

The Nevada Wolf Pack football statistical leaders are individual statistical leaders of the Nevada Wolf Pack football program in various categories, including passing, rushing, receiving, total offense, defensive stats, and kicking. Within those areas, the lists identify single-game, single-season, and career leaders. The Wolf Pack represent the University of Nevada, Reno in the NCAA's Mountain West Conference (MW).

Although Nevada began competing in intercollegiate football in 1896, the school's official record book does not include many statistics from before the 1940s, because records from before this year are often incomplete and inconsistent.

These lists are dominated by more recent players for several reasons:

- Since the 1940s, seasons have increased from 10 games to 11 and then 12 games in length.
  - Additionally, Nevada has been grouped in the same MW football division as Hawaii since divisional play began in 2013, meaning that it plays at Hawaii every other year. This is relevant because the NCAA allows teams that play at Hawaii in a given season to schedule 13 regular-season games instead of the normal 12. However, Nevada has not chosen to play a 13-game schedule in any season since 2013, even though it has had the option to do so twice.
- The NCAA didn't allow freshmen to play varsity football until 1972 (with the exception of the World War II years), allowing players to have four-year careers.
- Bowl games only began counting toward single-season and career statistics in 2002. The Wolf Pack have played in 10 bowl games since the decision, giving players in those seasons an extra game to accumulate statistics.
- Due to COVID-19 issues, the NCAA ruled that the 2020 season would not count against the athletic eligibility of any football player, giving everyone who played in that season the opportunity for five years of eligibility instead of the normal four.

These lists are updated through the end of the 2025 season.

== Passing ==
=== Passing yards ===
Career
Rank	Player	Yards	Years
1	David Neill	10,901	1998 1999 2000 2001
2	Colin Kaepernick	10,098	2007 2008 2009 2010
3	Cody Fajardo	9,659	2011 2012 2013 2014
4	Carson Strong	9,379	2018 2019 2020 2021
5	Eric Beavers	8,629	1983 1984 1985 1986
6	Fred Gatlin	8,312	1989 1990 1991 1992
7	Chris Vargas	8,130	1990 1991 1992 1993
8	Jeff Rowe	7,862	2002 2003 2004 2005 2006
9	Ty Gangi	7,378	2016 2017 2018
10	Mike Maxwell	7,256	1993 1994 1995

Single season
Rank	Player	Yards	Year
1	Chris Vargas	4,265	1993
2	Carson Strong	4,186	2021
3	Mike Maxwell	3,611	1995
4	Mike Maxwell	3,537	1994
5	John Dutton	3,526	1997
6	Zack Threadgill	3,418	2002
7	David Neill	3,402	1999
8	Ty Gangi	3,331	2018
9	David Neill	3,249	1998
10	Colin Kaepernick	3,022	2010

Single game
Rank	Player	Yards	Year	Opponent
1	David Neill	611	1998	New Mexico State
2	John Dutton	557	1997	Boise State
3	Mike Maxwell	552	1995	UNLV
4	Chris Vargas	538	1993	UNLV
5	Mike Maxwell	535	1995	Louisiana Tech
6	Chris Vargas	518	1993	Utah State
7	Eric Bennett	492	1995	San Jose State
8	David Neill	480	1998	Idaho
9	Carson Strong	476	2021	Fresno State
10	David Neill	474	2001	San Jose State

=== Passing touchdowns ===
Career
Rank	Player	TDs	Years
1	Colin Kaepernick	82	2007 2008 2009 2010
2	Eric Beavers	78	1983 1984 1985 1986
3	Carson Strong	74	2018 2019 2020 2021
4	David Neill	73	1998 1999 2000 2001
5	Fred Gatlin	63	1989 1990 1991 1992
6	Mike Maxwell	62	1993 1994 1995
7	Chris Vargas	60	1990 1991 1992 1993
8	Jeff Tisdel	59	1974 1975 1976 1977
9	Cody Fajardo	57	2011 2012 2013 2014
	Ty Gangi	57	2016 2017 2018

Single season
Rank	Player	TDs	Year
1	Carson Strong	36	2021
2	Chris Vargas	34	1993
3	Mike Maxwell	33	1995
4	Mike Maxwell	29	1994
	David Neill	29	1998
6	Eric Beavers	27	1985
	Carson Strong	27	2020
8	Jeff Tisdel	26	1976
	Zack Threadgill	26	2002
10	Jeff Tisdel	25	1977
	Eric Beavers	25	1986
	Ty Gangi	25	2017

Single game
Rank	Player	TDs	Year	Opponent
1	Chris Vargas	7	1993	UNLV
	Mike Maxwell	7	1995	UNLV
	Mike Maxwell	7	1995	Louisiana-Monroe
4	Carson Strong	6	2021	New Mexico State
5	Stan Heath	5	1948	Oklahoma City
	Larry Worman	5	1978	South Dakota
	Fred Gatlin	5	1989	Northern Arizona
	Fred Gatlin	5	1990	Western Illinois
	Chris Vargas	5	1992	Utah State
	Mike Maxwell	5	1995	Louisiana Tech
	John Dutton	5	1996	Arkansas State
	John Dutton	5	1997	Boise State
	David Neill	5	1998	Idaho
	Carson Strong	5	2020	Fresno State
	Carson Strong	5	2020	Tulane

== Rushing ==
=== Rushing yards ===
Career
Rank	Player	Yards	Years
1	Frank Hawkins	5,333	1977 1978 1979 1980
2	Vai Taua	4,588	2007 2008 2009 2010
3	Charvez Foger	4,484	1985 1986 1987 1988
4	Chris Lemon	4,246	1996 1997 1998 1999
5	Colin Kaepernick	4,112	2007 2008 2009 2010
6	Toa Taua	3,997	2018 2019 2020 2021 2022
7	Chance Kretschmer	3,782	2001 2002 2003 2004
8	Cody Fajardo	3,482	2011 2012 2013 2014
9	James Butler	3,316	2014 2015 2016
10	Luke Lippincott	3,014	2006 2007 2008 2009

Single season
Rank	Player	Yards	Year
1	Stefphon Jefferson	1,883	2012
2	Chance Kretschmer	1,732	2001
3	Frank Hawkins	1,719	1980
4	Frank Hawkins	1,683	1979
5	Vai Taua	1,610	2010
6	Vai Taua	1,521	2008
7	Frank Hawkins	1,445	1978
8	Luke Lippincott	1,420	2007
9	B.J. Mitchell	1,399	2005
10	Vai Taua	1,345	2009
	James Butler	1,345	2015

Single game
Rank	Player	Yards	Year	Opponent
1	Chance Kretschmer	327	2001	UTEP
2	Lucius Floyd	305	1986	Montana State
3	Frank Hawkins	293	1978	San Francisco State
4	Anthony Corley	274	1982	Weber State
5	Frank Hawkins	268	1980	Idaho
6	Vai Taua	263	2008	Fresno State
7	Otto Kelly	252	1983	Idaho
8	Stefphon Jefferson	247	2012	Northwestern State
9	Chance Kretschmer	242	2001	Louisiana Tech
10	Luke Lippincott	241	2007	Utah State

=== Rushing touchdowns ===
Career
Rank	Player	TDs	Years
1	Colin Kaepernick	59	2007 2008 2009 2010
2	Chris Lemon	53	1996 1997 1998 1999
3	Charvez Foger	52	1985 1986 1987 1988
4	Vai Taua	45	2007 2008 2009 2010
5	Cody Fajardo	44	2011 2012 2013 2014
6	Frank Hawkins	39	1977 1978 1979 1980
7	Chance Kretschmer	35	2001 2002 2003 2004
8	Luke Lippincott	34	2006 2007 2008 2009
9	Toa Taua	33	2018 2019 2020 2021 2022
10	Stefphon Jefferson	30	2010 2011 2012

Single season
Rank	Player	TDs	Year
1	Stefphon Jefferson	24	2012
2	Colin Kaepernick	20	2010
3	Chris Lemon	19	1997
	Vai Taua	19	2010
5	Colin Kaepernick	17	2008
6	Colin Kaepernick	16	2009
7	Frank Hawkins	15	1978
	Chance Kretschmer	15	2001
	Luke Lippincott	15	2007
	Vai Taua	15	2008

Single game
Rank	Player	TDs	Year	Opponent
1	Chance Kretschmer	6	2001	UTEP
	Stefphon Jefferson	6	2012	Hawai’i
3	Johnny Gordon	5	1984	Texas A&M-Kingsvhille
	Mike Ball	5	2009	UNLV
5	Frank Hawkins	4	1980	Idaho
	Lucius Floyd	4	1986	Montana State
	Ray Whalen	4	1990	Furman
	Chris Lemon	4	1997	New Mexico State
	B.J. Mitchell	4	2005	Idaho
	Luke Lippincott	4	2007	Louisiana Tech
	Luke Lippincott	4	2007	Boise State
	Colin Kaepernick	4	2009	Idaho
	Savion Red	4	2024	Oregon State

== Receiving ==
=== Receptions ===
Career
Rank	Player	Rec	Years
1	Trevor Insley	298	1996 1997 1998 1999
2	Geoff Noisy	295	1995 1996 1997 1998
3	Brandon Wimberly	261	2009 2010 2012 2013
4	Nate Burleson	248	2000 2001 2002
5	Bryan Reeves	234	1991 1992 1993
6	Alex Van Dyke	227	1994 1995
7	Romeo Doubs	225	2018 2019 2020 2021
8	Nichiren Flowers	214	2002 2003 2004
9	Caleb Spencer	189	2004 2005 2006
10	Richy Turner	184	2012 2013 2014

Single season
Rank	Player	Rec	Year
1	Nate Burleson	138	2002
2	Trevor Insley	134	1999
3	Alex Van Dyke	129	1995
4	Damond Wilkins	114	1996
5	Alex Van Dyke	98	1994
	Geoff Noisy	98	1996
7	Brandon Wimberly	97	2013
8	Geoff Noisy	94	1998
9	Bryan Reeves	91	1993
	Nichiren Flowers	91	2004
	Rishard Matthews	91	2011

Single game
Rank	Player	Rec	Year	Opponent
1	Nate Burleson	19	2002	UTEP
	Romeo Doubs	19	2021	Fresno State
3	Alex Van Dyke	18	1995	UNLV
	Alex Van Dyke	18	1995	Toledo
	Geoff Noisy	18	1996	Arkansas State
	Geoff Noisy	18	1997	Oregon
7	Trevor Insley	17	1999	Colorado State
8	Bryan Reeves	16	1992	Cal State-Fullerton
	Alex Van Dyke	16	1995	Louisiana Tech
10	Ross Ortega	15	1990	Furman
	Bryan Reeves	15	1992	San Jose State
	Alex Van Dyke	15	1994	Fresno State
	Alex Van Dyke	15	1995	Louisiana-Monroe
	Brandon Wimberly	15	2013	Air Force

=== Receiving yards ===
Career
Rank	Player	Yards	Years
1	Trevor Insley	5,005	1996 1997 1998 1999
2	Geoff Noisy	4,249	1995 1996 1997 1998
3	Bryan Reeves	3,408	1991 1992 1993
4	Romeo Doubs	3,332	2018 2019 2020 2021
5	Nate Burleson	3,287	1999 2000 2001 2002
6	Alex Van Dyke	3,100	1994 1995
7	Brandon Wimberly	3,049	2009 2010 2012 2013
8	Jeff Wright	3,034	1976 1977 1978 1979
9	Tony Logan	2,922	1985 1986 1987
10	Marko Mitchell	2,763	2006 2007 2008

Single season
Rank	Player	Yards	Year
1	Trevor Insley	2,060	1999
2	Alex Van Dyke	1,854	1995
3	Nate Burleson	1,629	2002
4	Geoff Noisy	1,435	1996
5	Geoff Noisy	1,405	1998
6	Rishard Matthews	1,364	2011
7	Alex Van Dyke	1,246	1994
8	Bryan Reeves	1,228	1993
9	Trevor Insley	1,220	1998
10	Geoff Noisy	1,184	1997

Single game
Rank	Player	Yards	Year	Opponent
1	Nate Burleson	326	2001	San Jose State
2	Alex Van Dyke	314	1995	San Jose State
3	Treamelle Taylor	299	1989	Montana
4	Geoff Noisy	296	1996	Utah State
5	Geoff Noisy	283	1998	New Mexico State
6	Alex Van Dyke	272	1995	Louisiana Tech
7	Trevor Insley	263	1999	North Texas
8	Geoff Noisy	259	1998	Idaho
9	Trevor Insley	254	1999	Idaho
10	Bryan Reeves	249	1993	Utah State

=== Receiving touchdowns ===
Career
Rank	Player	TDs	Years
1	Trevor Insley	35	1996 1997 1998 1999
2	Bryan Reeves	32	1990 1991 1992 1993
3	Jeff Wright	27	1976 1977 1978 1979
	Tony Logan	27	1985 1986 1987 1988
5	Alex Van Dyke	26	1994 1995
	Romeo Doubs	26	2018 2019 2020 2021
7	Bryan Calder	22	1983 1984 1985 1986
	Nate Burleson	22	1999 2000 2001 2002
	Marko Mitchell	22	2006 2007 2008
10	Geoff Noisy	21	1995 1996 1997 1998

Single season
Rank	Player	TDs	Year
1	Bryan Reeves	17	1993
2	Alex Van Dyke	16	1995
3	Trevor Insley	13	1999
4	Tony Logan	12	1987
	Steve McHenry	12	1995
	Nate Burleson	12	2002
7	Jeff Wright	11	1978
	Trevor Insley	11	1998
	Romeo Doubs	11	2021
10	Tony Logan	10	1988
	Bryan Reeves	10	1992
	Alex Van Dyke	10	1994
	Marko Mitchell	10	2008
	Cole Turner	10	2021

Single game
Rank	Player	TDs	Year	Opponent
1	Chris Singleton	4	1991	Eastern Washington

== Total offense ==
Total offense is the sum of passing and rushing statistics. It does not include receiving or returns.

=== Total offense yards ===
Career
Rank	Player	Yards	Years
1	Colin Kaepernick	14,210	2007 2008 2009 2010
2	Cody Fajardo	13,141	2011 2012 2013 2014
3	David Neill	11,145	1998 1999 2000 2001
4	Carson Strong	9,074	2018 2019 2020 2021
5	Eric Beavers	9,028	1983 1984 1985 1986
6	Fred Gatlin	8,568	1989 1990 1991 1992
7	Jeff Rowe	8,423	2002 2003 2004 2005 2006
8	Chris Vargas	8,181	1990 1991 1992 1993
9	Ty Gangi	7,921	2016 2017 2018
10	Mike Maxwell	7,129	1993 1994 1995

Single season
Rank	Player	Yards	Year
1	Chris Vargas	4,332	1993
2	Colin Kaepernick	4,228	2010
3	Colin Kaepernick	3,979	2008
4	Carson Strong	3,978	2021
5	Cody Fajardo	3,907	2012
6	Mike Maxwell	3,623	1995
7	David Neill	3,611	1999
8	Cody Fajardo	3,544	2014
9	Zack Threadgill	3,534	2002
10	John Dutton	3,522	1997

Single game
Rank	Player	Yards	Year	Opponent
1	David Neill	582	1998	New Mexico State
2	John Dutton	568	1997	Boise State
3	Mike Maxwell	543	1995	UNLV
4	Mike Maxwell	540	1995	Louisiana Tech
5	Chris Vargas	537	1993	UNLV
6	Chris Vargas	507	1993	Utah State
7	David Neill	507	2001	San Jose State
8	Chris Vargas	501	1993	San Jose State
9	David Neill	498	1998	Idaho
10	Eric Bennett	494	1995	San Jose State

=== Touchdowns responsible for ===
"Touchdowns responsible for" is the NCAA's official term for combined passing and rushing touchdowns.

The 2014 Nevada Wolf Pack Media Guide does not have any lists for total touchdowns responsible for, and since the Wolf Pack did not play in the FBS (formerly I-A) until 1992, most Internet statistical listing do not list the full history of Nevada's statistics. However, as Colin Kaepernick is the school leader in both passing touchdowns and rushing touchdowns, it is safe to say his 141 touchdowns responsible for are the school record (82 passing, 59 rushing; he also caught 1 touchdown pass that does not count toward this statistical measure).

== Defense ==
=== Interceptions ===
Career
Rank	Player	Ints	Years
1	Greg Grouwinkel	20	1972 1973 1974
	Joe Peterson	19	1983 1984 1985 1986
3	Alex Willis	18	1975 1976 1977 1978
4	Ken Byrne	17	1967 1968 1969 1970
5	Tony Shaw	17	1981 1982 1983
	Patrick Hunter	15	1982 1983 1984 1985
	Mike Brown	15	1985 1986 1987 1988
	Darnell Hasson	15	1993 1994 1995 1996
9	Xavier Kairy	14	1989 1990 1991 1992
	Nick Hawthrone	14	2003 2004 2005 2006

Single season
Rank	Player	Ints	Year
1	Greg Grouwinkel	9	1974
	Tony Shaw	9	1983
3	Greg Grouwinkel	7	1972
	Joe Peterson	7	1986
5	Jim Jamison	6	1966
	Lee Fobbs	6	1979
	Patrick Hunter	6	1985
	Mike Brown	6	1987
	Bernard Ellison	6	1987
	William Duckett	6	1989
	William Duckett	6	1991
	Darnell Hasson	6	1996
	Joe Garcia	6	2006
	Dameon Baber	6	2015

Single game
Rank	Player	Ints	Year	Opponent
1	Greg Grouwinkel	4	1974	Portland State

=== Tackles ===
Career
Rank	Player	Tackles	Years
1	DeShone Myles	528	1994 1995 1996 1997
2	Matt Clafton	388	1988 1989 1990 1991
3	Daryl Towns	322	2000 2001 2002 2003
4	Brock Marion	306	1989 1990 1991 1992
5	Jorge Cordova	301	2000 2001 2002 2003
6	James-Michael Johnson	295	2008 2009 2010 2011
	Duke Williams	295	2009 2010 2011 2012
8	Steve Knapp	292	1978 1979 1980 1981
9	Scott Lommori	286	1985 1986 1987
10	John Ramatici	279	1980 1981

Single season
Rank	Player	Tackles	Year
1	John Ramatici	162	1981
2	DeShone Myles	138	1994
3	Albert Rosette	135	2012
4	DeShone Myles	133	1995
5	DeShone Myles	132	1997
6	Matt Clafton	128	1990
7	Scott Lommori	125	1987
	Matt Clafton	125	1989
	DeShone Myles	125	1996
10	John Ramatici	117	1980

Single game
Rank	Player	Tackles	Year	Opponent
1	Albert Rosette	25	2012	Air Force

=== Sacks ===
Career
Rank	Player	Sacks	Years
1	Jorge Cordova	31.0	2000 2001 2002 2003
2	Dontay Moch	30.0	2007 2008 2009 2010
3	Henry Rolling	28.5	1983 1984 1985 1986
4	Dom Peterson	28.0	2018 2019 2020 2021 2022
5	Mark Drahos	25	1988 1989 1990 1991
6	Kevin Basped	23.5	2007 2008 2009
7	Brock Hekking	21.5	2011 2012 2013 2014
8	Lenny Jones	20.0	2012 2013 2014 2015
9	Derek Kennard	18.0	2000 2001 2002 2003
	Brett Roy	18.0	2008 2009 2010 2011
	Ian Seau	18.0	2013 2014 2015

Single season
Rank	Player	Sacks	Year
1	Henry Rolling	15.5	1986
2	Mark Drahos	12	1990
3	Jorge Cordova	11.5	2003
	Dontay Moch	11.5	2008
5	Derek Kennard	10.5	2003
6	Kevin Basped	10.0	2008
	Brett Roy	10.0	2011
	Ian Seau	10.0	2015
	Tristan Nichols	10.0	2021
10	J.J. Milan	9.5	2006
	Kevin Basped	9.5	2009

== Kicking ==
=== Field goals made ===
Career
Rank	Player	FGs	Years
1	Brandon Talton	83	2019 2020 2021 2022 2023
2	Marty Zendejas	72	1984 1985 1986 1987
3	Tony Zendejas	70	1981 1982 1983
4	Brett Jaekle	50	2005 2006 2007 2008
	Damon Fine	50	2001 2002 2003 2004
6	Brent Zuzo	49	2013 2014 2015 2016
7	Damon Shea	41	1995 1996 1997
8	Kevin McKelvie	33	1989 1990
9	Charlie Lee	29	1972 1973 1974 1975
	Fernando Serrano	29	1977 1978 1979

Single season
Rank	Player	FGs	Year
1	Tony Zendejas	26	1982
2	Tony Zendejas	23	1983
3	Marty Zendejas	22	1984
	Brandon Talton	22	2021
5	Tony Zendejas	21	1981
	Kevin McKelvie	21	1990
	Brandon Talton	21	2019
8	Damon Shea	20	1996
9	Marty Zendejas	19	1985
	Joe McFadden	19	2025

Single game
Rank	Player	FGs	Year	Opponent
1	Tony Zendejas	5	1982	Weber State
	Tony Zendejas	5	1982	Northern Arizona
	Tony Zendejas	5	1983	Idaho
	Marty Zendejas	5	1984	Idaho State
	Marty Zendejas	5	1985	Northern Arizona
	Damon Fine	5	2001	Rice
7	Charlie Lee	4	1974	Cal State-Northridge
	Marty Zendejas	4	1987	Idaho State
	Kevin McKelvie	4	1990	Eastern Washington
	Brett Jaekle	4	2006	Miami (FL)
	Brandon Talton	4	2019	Weber State
	Brandon Talton	4	2020	San Diego State
	Brandon Talton	4	2021	Boise State
	Brandon Talton	4	2023	New Mexico
	Joe McFadden	4	2026	Air Force

=== Field goal percentage ===
Career
Rank	Player	FG%	Years
1	Tony Zendejas	81.4%	1981 1982 1983
2	Allen Hardison	81.0%	2011 2012
3	Marty Zendejas	80.0%	1984 1985 1986 1987
4	Brandon Talton	79.0%	2019 2020 2021 2022 2023
5	Brent Zuzo	79.0%	2013 2014 2015 2016
6	Damon Shea	78.8%	1995 1996 1997
7	Kevin McKelvie	78.6%	1989 1990
8	Brett Jaekle	78.1%	2005 2006 2007 2008
9	Joe McFadden	76.0%	2025
10	Anthony Martinez	70.0%	2011 2012

Single season
Rank	Player	FG%	Year
1	Damon Shea	90.9%	1996
2	Allen Hardison	90.0%	2012
3	Brent Zuzo	89.5%	2015
4	Tony Zendejas	87.5%	1981
	Kevin McKelvie	87.5%	1990
6	Brandon Talton	84.0%	2019
7	Brandon Talton	83.3%	2020
	Brandon Talton	83.3%	2022
9	Marty Zendejas	82.4%	1986
	Brett Jaekle	82.4%	2008
	Brent Zuzo	82.4%	2014
