= List of Nevada Wolf Pack in the NFL draft =

This is a list of Nevada Wolf Pack football players in the NFL draft.

== Key ==
| B | Back | K | Kicker | NT | Nose tackle |
| C | Center | LB | Linebacker | FB | Fullback |
| DB | Defensive back | P | Punter | HB | Halfback |
| DE | Defensive end | QB | Quarterback | WR | Wide receiver |
| DT | Defensive tackle | RB | Running back | G | Guard |
| E | End | T | Offensive tackle | TE | Tight end |

== Selections ==
| Year | Round | Overall | Player | Team | Position |
|---|---|---|---|---|---|
| 1945 | 15 | 153 | Robert McClure | Green Bay Packers | T |
| 1945 | 26 | 272 | Don Talcott | Philadelphia Eagles | T |
| 1946 | 3 | 17 | Robert McClure | Boston Yanks | T |
| 1946 | 12 | 102 | Max Dodge | Boston Yanks | E |
| 1947 | 3 | 19 | Bill Mackrides | Philadelphia Eagles | B |
| 1947 | 25 | 229 | Tommy Kalmanir | Pittsburgh Steelers | B |
| 1948 | 9 | 72 | Scott Beasley | Philadelphia Eagles | E |
| 1948 | 25 | 231 | Stan Heath | Green Bay Packers | QB |
| 1948 | 28 | 260 | Ken Sinofsky | Los Angeles Rams | G |
| 1949 | 1 | 5 | Stan Heath | Green Bay Packers | QB |
| 1949 | 8 | 74 | Dan Orlich | Green Bay Packers | E |
| 1949 | 24 | 241 | Fred Leon | Philadelphia Eagles | T |
| 1950 | 14 | 173 | Fred Leon | Green Bay Packers | T |
| 1950 | 24 | 305 | Dick "Buster" Tilton | Washington Redskins | T |
| 1950 | 27 | 342 | Bill Osborne | Green Bay Packers | B |
| 1951 | 12 | 144 | Lawrence Hairston | Chicago Bears | T |
| 1951 | 16 | 186 | Dick Afflis | Green Bay Packers | T |
| 1952 | 13 | 155 | Pat Brady | New York Giants | B |
| 1952 | 30 | 350 | Ray Suchy | New York Yanks | G |
| 1962 | 14 | 188 | Jim Whitaker | Pittsburgh Steelers | E |
| 1966 | 11 | 159 | Welford Walton | Philadelphia Eagles | DE |
| 1978 | 6 | 163 | Doug Betters | Miami Dolphins | DE |
| 1981 | 5 | 136 | Eric Sanders | Atlanta Falcons | T |
| 1981 | 10 | 276 | Frank Hawkins | Oakland Raiders | RB |
| 1983 | 3 | 84 | Charles Mann | Washington Redskins | DE |
| 1984 | 1 | 20 | Alphonso Williams | Detroit Lions | WR |
| 1984 | 1 | 27 | Tony Zendejas | Washington Redskins | K |
| 1984 | 2 | 45 | Derek Kennard | St. Louis Cardinals | G |
| 1986 | 3 | 68 | Patrick Hunter | Seattle Seahawks | DB |
| 1987 | 5 | 135 | Henry Rolling | Tampa Bay Buccaneers | LB |
| 1989 | 8 | 196 | Charvez Foger | Dallas Cowboys | RB |
| 1989 | 9 | 230 | Patrick Egu | Tampa Bay Buccaneers | RB |
| 1990 | 12 | 331 | Demetrius Davis | Los Angeles Raiders | TE |
| 1991 | 7 | 189 | Bernard Ellison | Kansas City Chiefs | DB |
| 1991 | 9 | 233 | Treamelle Taylor | Tampa Bay Buccaneers | WR |
| 1993 | 5 | 117 | Forey Duckett | Cincinnati Bengals | DB |
| 1993 | 7 | 196 | Brock Marion | Dallas Cowboys | DB |
| 1996 | 2 | 31 | Alex Van Dyke | New York Jets | WR |
| 1997 | 6 | 173 | Mike Crawford | Miami Dolphins | LB |
| 1998 | 4 | 108 | DeShone Myles | Seattle Seahawks | LB |
| 1998 | 6 | 172 | John Dutton | Miami Dolphins | QB |
| 1998 | 6 | 175 | James Cannida | Tampa Bay Buccaneers | DT |
| 2003 | 3 | 71 | Nate Burleson | Minnesota Vikings | WR |
| 2004 | 3 | 86 | Jorge Cordova | Jacksonville Jaguars | LB |
| 2004 | 5 | 149 | Maurice Mann | Cincinnati Bengals | WR |
| 2006 | 5 | 165 | Tony Moll | Green Bay Packers | T |
| 2007 | 5 | 151 | Jeff Rowe | Cincinnati Bengals | QB |
| 2009 | 7 | 243 | Marko Mitchell | Washington Redskins | WR |
| 2011 | 2 | 36 | Colin Kaepernick | San Francisco 49ers | QB |
| 2011 | 3 | 66 | Dontay Moch | Cincinnati Bengals | LB |
| 2011 | 7 | 204 | Virgil Green | Denver Broncos | TE |
| 2012 | 4 | 120 | James-Michael Johnson | Cleveland Browns | LB |
| 2012 | 5 | 142 | Brandon Marshall | Jacksonville Jaguars | LB |
| 2012 | 6 | 184 | Isaiah Frey | Chicago Bears | DB |
| 2012 | 7 | 227 | Rishard Matthews | Miami Dolphins | WR |
| 2013 | 4 | 105 | Duke Williams | Buffalo Bills | DB |
| 2013 | 6 | 202 | Khalid Wooten | Tennessee Titans | DB |
| 2014 | 2 | 35 | Joel Bitonio | Cleveland Browns | T |
| 2018 | 2 | 33 | Austin Corbett | Cleveland Browns | G |
| 2022 | 4 | 132 | Romeo Doubs | Green Bay Packers | WR |
| 2022 | 5 | 149 | Cole Turner | Washington Commanders | TE |
| 2025 | 7 | 225 | Kitan Crawford | Arizona Cardinals | S |

== Notable undrafted players ==
Note: No drafts held before 1936

| Debut year | Player name | Position | Debut NFL/AFL team | Notes |
|---|---|---|---|---|
| 1970 | Terry Hermeling | T | Washington Redskins | — |
| 1978 | Jeff Tisdel | QB | Seattle Seahawks | — |
| 1980 | Don Smerek | DE | Dallas Cowboys | — |
| 1983 | Bob Hamm | DE | Kansas City Chiefs | — |
| 1983 | David Kilson | DB | Buffalo Bills | — |
| 1986 | Elston Ridgle | DE | Los Angeles Rams | — |
| 1987 | Joe Peterson | CB | New England Patriots | — |
| 1989 | Marty Zendejas | K | Los Angeles Rams | — |
| 1993 | Shar Pourdanesh | T | Cleveland Browns | — |
| 1994 | Bryan Reeves | WR | Arizona Cardinals | — |
| 1999 | Don Morgan | CB | Minnesota Vikings | — |
| 2000 | Trevor Insley | WR | Indianapolis Colts | — |
| 2003 | Corey Jackson | DE | Cleveland Browns | — |
| 2005 | Harvey Dahl | G | Dallas Cowboys | — |
| 2007 | J. J. Milan | DE | Oakland Raiders | — |
| 2009 | Josh Mauga | LB | New York Jets | — |
| 2010 | Jonathon Amaya | S | Miami Dolphins | — |
| 2010 | Kevin Basped | LB | New York Jets | — |
| 2011 | Vai Taua | RB | Buffalo Bills | — |
| 2012 | Kaelin Burnett | LB | Oakland Raiders | — |
| 2013 | Chris Barker | G | Miami Dolphins | — |
| 2013 | Stefphon Jefferson | RB | Tennessee Titans | — |
| 2013 | Zach Sudfeld | TE | New England Patriots | — |
| 2015 | Cody Fajardo | QB | Oakland Raiders | — |
| 2015 | Brock Hekking | LB | San Diego Chargers | — |
| 2016 | Don Jackson | RB | Green Bay Packers | — |
| 2016 | Lenny Jones | DE | San Francisco 49ers | — |
| 2016 | Ian Seau | LB | Los Angeles Rams | — |
| 2018 | James Butler | RB | Oakland Raiders | — |
| 2019 | Wesley Farnsworth | LS | Miami Dolphins | — |
| 2019 | Malik Reed | LB | Denver Broncos | — |
| 2020 | Ramiz Ahmad | K | Chicago Bears | — |
| 2022 | Carson Strong | QB | Philadelphia Eagles | — |
