= 2003 Nevada Wolf Pack football team =

American college football season

2003 Nevada Wolf Pack football
- Conference: Western Athletic Conference
- Record: 6–6 (4–4 WAC)
- Head coach: Chris Tormey (4th season)
- Offensive coordinator: Phil Earley (4th season)
- Offensive scheme: Spread
- Defensive coordinator: Jeff Mills (4th season)
- Base defense: 3–4
- Home stadium: Mackay Stadium

2003 Western Athletic Conference football standings
	Conf.			Overall
Team	W		L	W		L
No. 16 Boise State $	8	–	0	13	–	1
Fresno State	6	–	2	9	–	5
Tulsa	6	–	2	8	–	5
Hawaii	5	–	3	9	–	5
Rice	5	–	3	5	–	7
Nevada	4	–	4	6	–	6
Louisiana Tech	3	–	5	5	–	7
San Jose State	2	–	6	3	–	8
UTEP	1	–	7	2	–	10
SMU	0	–	8	0	–	12
$ – Conference champion; Rankings from AP Poll

The 2003 Nevada Wolf Pack football team represented the University of Nevada, Reno during the 2003 NCAA Division I-A football season. Nevada competed as a member of the Western Athletic Conference (WAC). The Wolf Pack were led by fourth–year head coach Chris Tormey, who was fired after the end of the season. They played their home games at Mackay Stadium.

== Schedule ==
Date	Time	Opponent	Site	TV	Result	Attendance
August 30	7:00 p.m.	Southern Utah (Div. I-AA)*	Mackay Stadium; Reno, NV		W 24–23	25,256
September 6	12:30 p.m.	at Oregon*	Autzen Stadium; Eugene, OR		L 23–31	56,471
September 18	7:00 p.m.	at San Jose State	Spartan Stadium; San Jose, CA	FSNBA	W 42–30	10,173
September 27	7:00 p.m.	SMU	Mackay Stadium; Reno, NV		W 12–9	21,128
October 4	7:00 p.m.	UNLV*	Mackay Stadium; Reno, NV (Fremont Cannon)	ESPN Plus	L 12–16	31,900
October 11	12:30 p.m.	at Washington*	Husky Stadium; Seattle, WA	FSN	W 28–17	70,149
October 18	12:00 p.m.	at Tulsa	Skelly Stadium; Tulsa, OK		W 28–21	17,816
October 25	1:00 p.m.	Louisiana Tech^{†}	Mackay Stadium; Reno, NV		L 34–42	22,157
November 1	12:00 p.m.	at Rice	Rice Stadium; Houston, TX		L 42–52	13,011
November 8	12:00 p.m.	Fresno State	Mackay Stadium; Reno, NV	KTVN	L 10–27	17,837
November 15	12:00 p.m.	Hawaii	Mackay Stadium; Reno, NV		W 24–14	15,268
November 29	12:00 p.m.	at No. 18 Boise State	Bronco Stadium; Boise, ID (rivalry)	KTVN	L 3–56	27,440
*Non-conference game; ^{†}Homecoming; Rankings from AP Poll released prior to the game; All times are in Pacific time

== Game summaries ==
=== Southern Utah ===
Southern Utah at Nevada

Team	1	2	3	4	Total
Thunderbirds	3	14	0	6	23
• Wolf Pack	7	7	7	3	24

- Date: August 30, 2003
- Location: Mackay Stadium
  Reno, NV
- Game start: 7:05 p.m. PDT
- Elapsed time: 3 hours and 35 minutes
- Game attendance: 25,256
- Game weather: Temperature: 85 °F (29 °C) • Weather: High Overcast • Wind: Light N
- Referee: Bill Athan
- TV announcers (None): None

Scoring summary
1	13:24	SUU	Steve Pulver 41–yard field goal	SUU 3–0
1	07:14	NEV	Logan Carter 0–yard fumble recovery (Damon Fine kick)	NEV 7–3
2	10:38	NEV	Nichiren Flowers 10–yard pass from Jeff Rowe (Damon Fine kick)	NEV 14–3
2	10:25	SUU	Christian Cox 91–yard kickoff return (Steve Pulver kick)	NEV 14–10
2	08:35	SUU	Michael Culpepper 9–yard pass from Casey Rehrer (Steve Pulver kick)	SUU 17–14
3	02:42	NEV	Willie Johnson 22–yard pass from Andy Heiser (Damon Fine kick)	NEV 21–17
4	05:35	NEV	Damon Fine 53–yard field goal	NEV 24–17
4	03:06	SUU	Wes Patterson 11–yard pass from Casey Rehrer (Steve Pulver kick blocked)	NEV 24–23

=== At Oregon ===
Nevada at Oregon

Team	1	2	3	4	Total
Wolf Pack	0	7	7	9	23
• Ducks	10	14	7	0	31

- Date: September 6, 2003
- Location: Autzen Stadium
  Eugene, OR
- Game start: 12:40 p.m. PDT
- Elapsed time: 3 hours and 30 minutes
- Game attendance: 56,471
- Game weather: Temperature: 64 °F (18 °C) • Weather: Overcast • Wind: W 9 MPH
- Referee: Brian O'Cain
- TV announcers (None): None

Scoring summary
1	11:54	ORE	Jared Siegel 22–yard field goal	ORE 3–0
1	08:01	ORE	Demetrius Williams 11–yard pass from Kellen Clemens (Jared Siegel kick)	ORE 10–0
2	10:29	ORE	Samie Parker 43–yard pass from Jason Fife (Jared Siegel kick)	ORE 17–0
2	01:22	NEV	Nichiren Flowers 27–yard pass from Andy Heiser (Damon Fine kick)	ORE 17–7
2	00:05	ORE	Samie Parker 39–yard pass from Kellen Clemens (Jared Siegel kick)	ORE 24–7
3	11:20	NEV	Anthony Pudewell 11–yard pass from Andy Heiser (Damon Fine kick)	ORE 24–14
3	06:04	ORE	Keith Lewis 9–yard interception (Jared Siegel kick)	ORE 31–14
4	14:30	NEV	Chance Kretschmer 1–yard run (Damon Fine kick failed)	ORE 31–20
4	09:48	NEV	Damon Fine 27–yard field goal	ORE 31–23

=== At San Jose State ===
Nevada at San Jose State

Team	1	2	3	4	Total
• Wolf Pack	13	13	9	7	42
Spartans	0	10	14	6	30

- Date: September 18, 2003
- Location: Spartan Stadium
  San Jose, CA
- Game start: 7:07 p.m. PDT
- Elapsed time: 3 hours and 24 minutes
- Game attendance: 10,173
- Game weather: Temperature: 78 °F (26 °C) • Weather: Clear • Wind: Light
- Referee: Paul Labenne
- TV announcers (FSNBA): N/A

Scoring summary
1	07:25	NEV	Chance Kretschmer 1–yard run (Damon Fine kick)	NEV 7–0
1	00:45	NEV	Chance Kretschmer 7–yard run (Damon Fine kick failed)	NEV 13–0
2	10:40	SJSU	Jeff Carr 35–yard field goal	NEV 13–3
2	08:41	NEV	Talib Wise 74–yard pass from Andy Heiser (Damon Fine kick)	NEV 20–3
2	02:33	NEV	Tony Moll 20–yard pass from Andy Heiser (Damon Fine kick failed)	NEV 26–3
2	00:00	SJSU	Gerald Jones 99–yard interception (Jeff Carr kick)	NEV 26–10
3	13:02	NEV	Andy Heiser 9–yard run (Talib Wise rush failed)	NEV 32–10
3	12:47	SJSU	Trestin George 99–yard kickoff return (Jeff Carr kick)	NEV 32–17
3	05:41	NEV	Damon Fine 38–yard field goal	NEV 35–17
3	01:22	SJSU	Courtney Anderson 5–yard pass from Scott Rislov (Jeff Carr kick)	NEV 35–24
4	10:14	SJSU	Jamall Broussard 27–yard pass from Scott Rislov (Lance Martin rush failed)	NEV 35–30
4	04:19	NEV	Chance Kretschmer 1–yard run (Damon Fine kick)	NEV 42–30

=== SMU ===
SMU at Nevada

Team	1	2	3	4	Total
Mustangs	3	6	0	0	9
• Wolf Pack	0	0	9	3	12

- Date: September 27, 2003
- Location: Mackay Stadium
  Reno, NV
- Game start: 7:05 p.m. PDT
- Elapsed time: 2 hours and 34 minutes
- Game attendance: 21,128
- Game weather: Temperature: 83 °F (28 °C) • Weather: Clear • Wind: NE 10 MPH
- Referee: Frank White
- TV announcers (None): None

Scoring summary
1	07:43	SMU	Chris McMurtray 33–yard field goal	SMU 3–0
2	01:58	SMU	Keylon Kincade 1–yard run (Tate Wallis rush failed)	SMU 9–0
3	05:10	NEV	Damon Fine 38–yard field goal	SMU 9–3
3	02:44	NEV	Logan Carter 40–yard interception (Damon Fine kick failed)	TIE 9–9
4	01:13	NEV	Damon Fine 28–yard field goal	NEV 12–9

=== UNLV ===
UNLV at Nevada
(Battle for the Fremont Cannon)

Team	1	2	3	4	Total
• Rebels	3	0	3	10	16
Wolf Pack	6	3	3	0	12

- Date: October 4, 2003
- Location: Mackay Stadium
  Reno, NV
- Game start: 7:05 p.m. PDT
- Elapsed time: 3 hours and 32 minutes
- Game attendance: 31,900
- Game weather: Temperature: 74 °F (23 °C) • Weather: Broken Sky and No Rain • Wind: N 10 MPH
- Referee: Gerald Wright
- TV announcers (ESPN+): N/A

Scoring summary
1	10:57	UNLV	Dillon Pieffer 26–yard field goal	UNLV 3–0
1	05:43	NEV	Chance Kretschmer 6–yard run (Damon Fine kick failed)	NEV 6–3
2	00:03	NEV	Damon Fine 24–yard field goal	NEV 9–3
3	08:30	NEV	Damon Fine 21–yard field goal	NEV 12–3
3	03:25	UNLV	Dillon Pieffer 33–yard field goal	NEV 12–6
4	12:10	UNLV	Dyante Perkins 29–yard run (Dillon Pieffer kick)	UNLV 13–12
4	04:08	UNLV	Dillon Pieffer 27–yard field goal	UNLV 16–12

=== At Washington ===
Nevada at Washington

Team	1	2	3	4	Total
• Wolf Pack	14	0	14	0	28
Huskies	0	7	10	0	17

- Date: October 11, 2003
- Location: Husky Stadium
  Seattle, WA
- Game start: 12:41 p.m. PDT
- Elapsed time: 3 hours and 27 minutes
- Game attendance: 70,149
- Game weather: Temperature: 52 °F (11 °C) • Weather: Light Rain • Wind: S 3–5 MPH
- Referee: Dave Cutaia
- TV announcers (FSN): N/A

Scoring summary
1	05:07	NEV	Maurice Mann 25–yard pass from Andy Heiser (Damon Fine kick)	NEV 7–0
1	04:34	NEV	Chris Handy 37–yard interception (Damon Fine kick)	NEV 14–0
2	00:35	WASH	Rich Alexis 2–yard run (Evan Knudson kick)	NEV 14–7
3	08:50	NEV	Anthony Pudewell 8–yard pass from Andy Heiser (Damon Fine kick)	NEV 21–7
3	05:44	WASH	Evan Knudson 42–yard field goal	NEV 21–10
3	03:55	NEV	Talib Wise 7–yard pass from Andy Heiser (Damon Fine kick)	NEV 28–10
3	03:11	WASH	Reggie Williams 52–yard pass from Cody Pickett (Evan Knudson kick)	NEV 28–17

=== At Tulsa ===
Nevada at Tulsa

Team	1	2	3	4	Total
• Wolf Pack	14	7	0	7	28
Golden Hurricane	0	7	0	14	21

- Date: October 18, 2003
- Location: Skelly Stadium
  Tulsa, OK
- Game start: 2:00 p.m. CDT
- Elapsed time: 3 hours and 2 minutes
- Game attendance: 17,816
- Game weather: Temperature: 67 °F (19 °C) • Weather: Sunny • Wind: S 8 MPH
- Referee: Gene Semko
- TV announcers (None): None

Scoring summary
1	10:47	NEV	Chance Kretschmer 2–yard run (Damon Fine kick)	NEV 7–0
1	00:50	NEV	Willie Johnson 31–yard pass from Andy Heiser (Damon Fine kick)	NEV 14–0
2	06:51	TULSA	Uril Parrish 3–yard run (Brad DeVault kick)	NEV 14–7
2	00:36	NEV	Andy Heiser 5–yard pass from Chance Kretschmer (Damon Fine kick)	NEV 21–7
4	13:42	TULSA	Uril Parrish 20–yard run (Brad DeVault kick)	NEV 21–14
4	06:17	TULSA	Uril Parrish 2–yard run (Brad DeVault kick)	TIE 21–21
4	05:54	NEV	Chance Kretschmer 30–yard run (Damon Fine kick)	NEV 28–21

=== Louisiana Tech ===
Louisiana Tech at Nevada

Team	1	2	3	4	Total
• Bulldogs	0	13	15	14	42
Wolf Pack	14	7	7	6	34

- Date: October 25, 2003
- Location: Mackay Stadium
  Reno, NV
- Game start: 1:05 p.m. PDT
- Elapsed time: 3 hours and 24 minutes
- Game attendance: 22,157
- Game weather: Temperature: 69 °F (21 °C) • Weather: High Clouds and Sunny • Wind: S 10–15 MPH
- Referee: Rich Kollen
- TV announcers (None): None

Scoring summary
1	11:49	NEV	B.J. Mitchell 2–yard run (Damon Fine kick)	NEV 7–0
1	01:36	NEV	Chance Kretschmer 1–yard run (Damon Fine kick)	NEV 14–0
2	14:49	LATECH	Josh Scobee 24–yard field goal	NEV 14–3
2	13:48	NEV	Talib Wise 22–yard run (Damon Fine kick)	NEV 21–3
2	06:54	LATECH	Ryan Moats 1–yard run (Josh Scobee kick)	NEV 21–10
2	01:16	LATECH	Josh Scobee 39–yard field goal	NEV 21–13
3	12:11	LATECH	D.J. Curry 4–yard pass from Luke McCown (Tramissian Davis pass)	TIE 21–21
3	07:52	LATECH	Ryan Moats 1–yard run (Josh Scobee kick)	NEV 28–21
3	00:08	NEV	B.J. Mitchell 5–yard run (Damon Fine kick)	TIE 28–28
4	12:04	NEV	Chance Kretschmer 6–yard run (Team kick failed)	NEV 34–28
4	09:49	LATECH	Tramissian Davis 30–yard pass from Luke McCown (Josh Scobee kick)	LATECH 35–34
4	06:13	LATECH	Ryan Moats 69–yard run (Josh Scobee kick)	LATECH 42–34

=== At Rice ===
Nevada at Rice

Team	1	2	3	4	Total
Wolf Pack	7	14	14	7	42
• Owls	10	7	21	14	52

- Date: November 1, 2003
- Location: Rice Stadium
  Houston, TX
- Game start: 2:07 p.m. CST
- Elapsed time: 3 hours and 12 minutes
- Game attendance: 13,011
- Game weather: Temperature: 82 °F (28 °C) • Weather: Clear • Wind: SE 10–15 MPH
- Referee: Paul Labenne
- TV announcers (None): None

Scoring summary
1	09:10	NEV	Chance Kretschmer 8–yard run (Damon Fine kick)	NEV 7–0
1	08:16	RICE	Joe Don Wood 22–yard pass from Kyle Herm (Brennan Landry kick)	TIE 7–7
1	00:00	RICE	Brennan Landry 28–yard field goal	RICE 10–7
2	12:16	NEV	Maurice Mann 39–yard pass from Andy Hesier (Damon Fine kick)	NEV 14–10
2	08:21	RICE	Kyle Herm 12–yard run (Brennan Landry kick)	RICE 17–14
2	00:27	NEV	Dell McGee 15–yard pass from Andy Hesier (Damon Fine kick)	NEV 21–17
3	11:04	RICE	Joe Moore 32–yard pass from Kyle Herm (Brennan Landry kick)	RICE 24–21
3	08:43	NEV	Tony Moll 10–yard pass from Andy Hesier (Damon Fine kick)	NEV 28–24
3	07:34	RICE	Terry Holley 22–yard interception (Brennan Landry kick)	RICE 31–28
3	04:41	NEV	Chance Kretschmer 9–yard run (Damon Fine kick)	NEV 35–31
3	01:57	RICE	Thomas Lott 22–yard run (Brennan Landry kick)	RICE 38–35
4	10:45	RICE	Kyle Herm 95–yard run (Brennan Landry kick)	RICE 45–35
4	07:00	NEV	B.J. Mitchell 19–yard run (Damon Fine kick)	RICE 45–42
4	01:41	RICE	Raymorris Barnes 69–yard fumble recovery (Brennan Landry kick)	RICE 52–45

=== Fresno State ===
Fresno State at Nevada

Team	1	2	3	4	Total
• Bulldogs	21	0	3	3	27
Wolf Pack	3	0	0	7	10

- Date: November 8, 2003
- Location: Mackay Stadium
  Reno, NV
- Game start: 12:07 p.m. PST
- Elapsed time: 3 hours and 15 minutes
- Game attendance: 17,837
- Game weather: Temperature: 52 °F (11 °C) • Weather: Cloudy and Possible Rain and Snow • Wind: 5–10 MPH
- Referee: Frank White
- TV announcers (KTVN): N/A

Scoring summary
1	09:18	FS	Mark Wood 5–yard pass from Paul Pinegar (Brett Visintainer kick)	FS 7–0
1	07:32	FS	Bryson Sumlin 1–yard run (Brett Visintainer kick)	FS 14–0
1	05:22	FS	Dwayne Wright 3–yard run (Brett Visintainer kick)	FS 21–0
1	00:31	NEV	Damon Fine 39–yard field goal	FS 21–3
3	05:40	FS	Brett Visintainer 42–yard field goal	FS 24–3
4	09:16	NEV	Tim Fleming 58–yard pass from Andy Hesier (Damon Fine kick)	FS 24–10
4	05:25	FS	Brett Visintainer 22–yard field goal	FS 27–10

=== Hawaii ===
Hawaii at Nevada

Team	1	2	3	4	Total
Warriors	0	0	14	0	14
• Wolf Pack	0	6	15	3	24

- Date: November 15, 2003
- Location: Mackay Stadium
  Reno, NV
- Game start: 12:07 p.m. PST
- Elapsed time: 3 hours and 16 minutes
- Game attendance: 15,268
- Game weather: Temperature: 55 °F (13 °C) • Weather: Cloudy and Possible Rain • Wind: 15 MPH
- Referee: Paul Labenne
- TV announcers (None): None

Scoring summary
2	07:13	NEV	Damon Fine 28–yard field goal	NEV 3–0
2	03:29	NEV	Damon Fine 42–yard field goal	NEV 6–0
3	10:48	UH	Chad Owens 39–yard pass from Timmy Chang (Justin Ayat kick)	UH 7–6
3	10:37	UH	Travis LaBoy 16–yard fumble recovery (Justin Ayat kick)	UH 14–6
3	06:17	NEV	Chance Kretschmer 1–yard run (Andy Heiser pass failed)	UH 14–12
3	06:06	NEV	Derek Kennard Jr. 11–yard interception (Andy Heiser pass failed)	NEV 18–14
3	01:58	NEV	Damon Fine 25–yard field goal	NEV 21–14
4	11:08	NEV	Damon Fine 23–yard field goal	NEV 24–14

=== At Boise State ===
Nevada at Boise State
(rivalry)

Team	1	2	3	4	Total
Wolf Pack	0	0	3	0	3
• No. 18 Broncos	21	21	14	0	56

- Date: November 29, 2003
- Location: Bronco Stadium
  Boise, ID
- Game start: 1:07 p.m. MST
- Elapsed time: 3 hours and 8 minutes
- Game attendance: 27,440
- Game weather: Temperature: 43 °F (6 °C) • Weather: Light Rain • Wind: SE 13 MPH
- Referee: Bill Athan
- TV announcers (KTVN): N/A

Scoring summary
1	14:37	BSU	Tony McPherson 76–yard pass from Ryan Dinwiddie (Tyler Jones kick)	BSU 7–0
1	09:21	BSU	Ryan Dinwiddie 1–yard run (Tyler Jones kick)	BSU 14–0
1	01:21	BSU	Ryan Dinwiddie 1–yard run (Tyler Jones kick)	BSU 21–0
2	09:02	BSU	David Mikell 8–yard pass from Ryan Dinwiddie (Tyler Jones kick)	BSU 28–0
2	07:11	BSU	T. J. Acree 44–yard pass from Ryan Dinwiddie (Tyler Jones kick)	BSU 35–0
2	00:42	BSU	Lawrence Bady 46–yard pass from Ryan Dinwiddie (Tyler Jones kick)	BSU 42–0
3	08:40	BSU	David Mikell 5–yard run (Tyler Jones kick)	BSU 49–0
3	05:35	NEV	Damon Fine 28–yard field goal	BSU 49–3
3	01:32	BSU	Jared Zabransky 1–yard run (Tyler Jones kick)	BSU 56–3
