= 2002 Nevada Wolf Pack football team =

American college football season

2002 Nevada Wolf Pack football
- Conference: Western Athletic Conference
- Record: 5–7 (4–4 WAC)
- Head coach: Chris Tormey (3rd season)
- Offensive coordinator: Phil Earley (3rd season)
- Offensive scheme: Spread
- Defensive coordinator: Jeff Mills (3rd season)
- Base defense: 3–4
- Home stadium: Mackay Stadium

2002 Western Athletic Conference football standings
	Conf.			Overall
Team	W		L	W		L
No. 15 Boise State $	8	–	0	12	–	1
Hawaii	7	–	1	10	–	4
Fresno State	6	–	2	9	–	5
San Jose State	4	–	4	6	–	7
Nevada	4	–	4	5	–	7
Rice	3	–	5	4	–	7
Louisiana Tech	3	–	5	4	–	8
SMU	3	–	5	3	–	9
UTEP	1	–	7	2	–	10
Tulsa	1	–	7	1	–	11
$ – Conference champion; Rankings from AP Poll

The 2002 Nevada Wolf Pack football team represented the University of Nevada, Reno during the 2002 NCAA Division I-A football season. Nevada competed as a member of the Western Athletic Conference (WAC). The Wolf Pack were led by third–year head coach Chris Tormey and played their home games at Mackay Stadium.

== Schedule ==
Date	Time	Opponent	Site	TV	Result	Attendance
August 31	12:00 p.m.	vs. No. 12 Washington State*	Seahawks Stadium; Seattle, WA (Cougar Gridiron Classic)	FSNNW	L 7–31	63,588
September 14	1:00 p.m.	BYU*	Mackay Stadium; Reno, NV	KRNV	W 31–28	23,109
September 21	1:00 p.m.	Rice	Mackay Stadium; Reno, NV		W 31–21	17,201
September 28	1:00 p.m.	No. 25 Colorado State*	Mackay Stadium; Reno, NV		L 28–32	19,292
October 5	7:00 p.m.	at UNLV*	Sam Boyd Stadium; Whitney, NV (Fremont Cannon)	KRNV	L 17–21	28,341
October 12	9:00 p.m.	at Hawaii	Aloha Stadium; Halawa, HI	KRNV	L 34–59	39,616
October 19	1:00 p.m.	San Jose State^{†}	Mackay Stadium; Reno, NV		W 52–24	19,481
October 26	12:00 p.m.	at Louisiana Tech	Joe Aillet Stadium; Ruston, LA		L 47–50	15,315
November 2	12:00 p.m.	at SMU	Gerald J. Ford Stadium; University Park, TX	KRNV	W 24–6	11,832
November 9	12:00 p.m.	UTEP	Mackay Stadium; Reno, NV		W 23–17	13,721
November 16	4:00 p.m.	at Fresno State	Bulldog Stadium; Fresno, CA	KRNV	L 30–38	40,866
November 23	12:00 p.m.	No. 23 Boise State	Mackay Stadium; Reno, NV (rivalry)		L 7–44	20,247
*Non-conference game; ^{†}Homecoming; Rankings from AP Poll released prior to the game; All times are in Pacific time

== Game summaries ==
=== Vs. Washington State ===
Nevada vs. Washington State
(Cougar Gridiron Classic)

Team	1	2	3	4	Total
Wolf Pack	7	0	0	0	7
• No. 12 Cougars	0	14	0	17	31

- Date: August 31, 2002
- Location: Seahawks Stadium
  Seattle, WA
- Game start: 12:05 p.m. PDT
- Elapsed time: 2 hours and 5 minutes
- Game attendance: 63,588
- Game weather: Temperature: 79 °F (26 °C) • Weather: Hazy and Partly Cloudy • Wind: N 3 MPH
- Referee: Jack Folliard
- TV announcers (FSNNW): N/A

Scoring summary
1	01:27	NEV	Chance Kretschmer 7–yard run (Damon Fine kick)	NEV 7–0
2	14:52	WSU	Jerome Riley 44–yard pass from Jason Gesser (Drew Dunning kick)	TIE 7–7
2	00:27	WSU	Jonathan Smith 2–yard run (Drew Dunning kick)	WSU 14–7
4	14:31	WSU	Jonathan Smith 2–yard run (Drew Dunning kick)	WSU 21–7
4	11:07	WSU	Drew Dunning 40–yard field goal	WSU 24–7
4	06:42	WSU	Will Derting 98–yard interception (Drew Dunning kick)	WSU 31–7

=== BYU ===
BYU at Nevada

Team	1	2	3	4	Total
Cougars	0	14	14	0	28
• Wolf Pack	10	21	0	0	31

- Date: September 14, 2002
- Location: Mackay Stadium
  Reno, NV
- Game start: 1:07 p.m. PDT
- Elapsed time: 3 hours and 24 minutes
- Game attendance: 23,109
- Game weather: Temperature: 85 °F (29 °C) • Weather: Sun with High Clouds • Wind: Light
- Referee: Gene Semko
- TV announcers (KRNV): N/A

Scoring summary
1	03:31	NEV	Damon Fine 41–yard field goal	NEV 3–0
1	01:30	NEV	Nate Burleson 95–yard pass from Zack Threadgill (Damon Fine kick)	NEV 10–0
2	14:54	BYU	Rod Wilkerson 31–yard pass from Bret Engemann (Matt Payne kick)	NEV 10–7
2	11:02	NEV	Dan Bythwood 16–yard pass from Zack Threadgill (Damon Fine kick)	NEV 17–7
2	06:59	BYU	Reno Mahe 4–yard run (Matt Payne kick)	NEV 17–14
2	00:48	NEV	Erick Streelman 13–yard pass from Zack Threadgill (Damon Fine kick)	NEV 24–14
2	00:01	NEV	Tim Fleming 9–yard pass from Zack Threadgill (Damon Fine kick)	NEV 31–14
3	10:21	BYU	Marcus Whalen 30–yard run (Matt Payne kick)	NEV 31–21
3	04:09	BYU	Gabe Reid 9–yard pass from Lance Pendleton (Matt Payne kick)	NEV 31–28

=== Rice ===
Rice at Nevada

Team	1	2	3	4	Total
Owls	14	0	0	7	21
• Wolf Pack	10	7	7	7	31

- Date: September 21, 2002
- Location: Mackay Stadium
  Reno, NV
- Game start: 1:07 p.m. PDT
- Elapsed time: 2 hours and 49 minutes
- Game attendance: 17,201
- Game weather: Temperature: 81 °F (27 °C) • Weather: Sunny • Wind: Light
- Referee: Robert Cameron
- TV announcers (None): None

Scoring summary
1	11:08	NEV	Damon Fine 28–yard field goal	NEV 3–0
1	09:05	NEV	Nate Burleson 4–yard pass from Zack Threadgill (Damon Fine kick)	NEV 10–0
1	08:44	RICE	Vincent Hawkins 80–yard run (Brennan Landry kick)	NEV 10–7
1	02:30	RICE	Jeremy Hurd 21–yard pass from Kyle Herm (Brennan Landry kick)	RICE 14–10
2	05:24	NEV	Nate Burleson 19–yard pass from Zack Threadgill (Damon Fine kick)	NEV 17–14
3	03:35	NEV	Tim Fleming 31–yard pass from Zack Threadgill (Damon Fine kick)	NEV 24–14
4	11:58	NEV	Nichiren Flowers 11–yard pass from Zack Threadgill (Damon Fine kick)	NEV 31–14
4	11:03	RICE	Jeremy Hurd 71–yard pass from Greg Henderson (Brennan Landry kick)	NEV 31–21

=== Colorado State ===
Colorado State at Nevada

Team	1	2	3	4	Total
• No. 25 Rams	0	7	11	14	32
Wolf Pack	7	7	7	7	28

- Date: September 28, 2002
- Location: Mackay Stadium
  Reno, NV
- Game start: 1:07 p.m. PDT
- Elapsed time: 3 hours and 15 minutes
- Game attendance: 19,292
- Game weather: Temperature: 72 °F (22 °C) • Weather: High Clouds • Wind: W 20 MPH
- Referee: Ken Flaherty
- TV announcers (None): None

Scoring summary
1	00:46	NEV	Tim Fleming 23–yard pass from Zack Threadgill (Damon Fine kick)	NEV 7–0
2	10:55	NEV	Nate Burleson 21–yard pass from Zack Threadgill (Damon Fine kick)	NEV 14–0
2	08:12	CSU	Chris Pittman 34–yard pass from Justin Holland (Jeff Babcock kick)	NEV 14–7
3	12:43	NEV	Erick Streelman 9–yard pass from Zack Threadgill (Damon Fine kick)	NEV 21–7
3	07:52	CSU	Jeff Babcock 29–yard field goal	NEV 21–10
3	04:40	CSU	Cecil Sapp 2–yard run (Joey Cuppari pass)	NEV 21–18
4	14:12	CSU	Bradlee Van Pelt 8–yard run (Jeff Babcock kick)	CSU 25–21
4	06:26	NEV	Matt Milton 20–yard run (Damon Fine kick)	NEV 28–25
4	02:43	CSU	Joel Dreessen 34–yard pass from Bradlee Van Pelt (Jeff Babcock kick)	CSU 32–28

=== At UNLV ===
Nevada at UNLV
(Battle for the Fremont Cannon)

Team	1	2	3	4	Total
Wolf Pack	0	6	0	11	17
• Rebels	7	7	0	7	21

- Date: October 5, 2002
- Location: Sam Boyd Stadium
  Whitney, NV
- Game start: 7:06 p.m. PDT
- Elapsed time: 3 hours and 41 minutes
- Game attendance: 28,341
- Game weather: Temperature: 77 °F (25 °C) • Weather: Clear • Wind: SW 2 MPH
- Referee: Gene Semko
- TV announcers (KRNV): N/A

Scoring summary
1	11:52	UNLV	Joe Haro 1–yard run (Dillon Pieffer kick)	UNLV 7–0
2	13:37	NEV	Damon Fine 19–yard field goal	UNLV 7–3
2	10:44	UNLV	Larry Croom 12–yard pass from Jason Thomas (Dillon Pieffer kick)	UNLV 14–3
2	03:16	NEV	Damon Fine 25–yard field goal	UNLV 14–6
4	12:31	NEV	Damon Fine 37–yard field goal	UNLV 14–9
4	08:51	NEV	Nate Burleson 25–yard pass from Zack Threadgill (Erick Streelman pass)	NEV 17–14
4	06:03	UNLV	Larry Croom 45–yard pass from Jason Thomas (Dillon Pieffer kick)	UNLV 21–17

=== At Hawaii ===
Nevada at Hawaii

Team	1	2	3	4	Total
Wolf Pack	10	12	12	0	34
• Warriors	42	10	7	0	59

- Date: October 12, 2002
- Location: Aloha Stadium
  Halawa, HI
- Game start: 6:08 p.m.
- Elapsed time: 3 hours and 41 minutes
- Game attendance: 39,616
- Game weather: Temperature: 74 °F (23 °C) • Weather: Mostly Clear and Showers • Wind: TR 10–20 MPH
- Referee: Paul Labenne
- TV announcers (KRNV): N/A

Scoring summary
1	14:40	UH	Britton Komine 72–yard pass from Timmy Chang (Justin Ayat kick)	UH 7–0
1	13:49	UH	Hyrum Peters 64–yard interception (Justin Ayat kick)	UH 14–0
1	11:36	NEV	Zack Threadgill 2–yard run (Damon Fine kick)	UH 14–7
1	10:38	UH	Chad Owens 50–yard pass from Timmy Chang (Justin Ayat kick)	UH 21–7
1	07:59	UH	Michael Brewster 4–yard run (Justin Ayat kick)	UH 28–7
1	05:50	UH	John West 6–yard run (Justin Ayat kick)	UH 35–7
1	02:04	NEV	Damon Fine 27–yard field goal	UH 35–10
1	00:39	UH	Britton Komine 54–yard pass from Shawn Withy-Allen (Justin Ayat kick)	UH 42–10
2	12:23	UH	John West 2–yard run (Justin Ayat kick)	UH 49–10
2	07:45	NEV	Matt Milton 1–yard run (Damon Fine kick failed)	UH 49–16
2	04:42	NEV	Erick Streelman 3–yard pass from Zack Threadgill (pass failed)	UH 49–22
2	01:55	UH	Justin Ayat 25–yard field goal	UH 52–22
3	06:59	NEV	Nichiren Flowers 20–yard pass from Zack Threadgill (pass failed)	UH 52–28
3	04:35	UH	John West 2–yard run (Justin Ayat kick)	UH 59–28
3	01:07	NEV	B.J. Mitchell 2–yard run (Zack Threadgill rush failed)	UH 59–34

=== San Jose State ===
San Jose State at Nevada

Team	1	2	3	4	Total
Spartans	0	17	0	7	24
• Wolf Pack	7	7	17	21	52

- Date: October 19, 2002
- Location: Mackay Stadium
  Reno, NV
- Game start: 1:07 p.m. PDT
- Elapsed time: 2 hours and 58 minutes
- Game attendance: 19,481
- Game weather: Temperature: 67 °F (19 °C) • Weather: Clear and Mostly Sunny • Wind: Calm
- Referee: Frank White
- TV announcers (None): None

Scoring summary
1	05:31	NEV	Maurice Mann 36–yard pass from Zack Threadgill (Damon Fine kick)	NEV 7–0
2	14:16	SJSU	Nick Gilliam 22–yard field goal	NEV 7–3
2	06:45	NEV	B.J. Mitchell 3–yard run (Damon Fine kick)	NEV 14–3
2	04:31	SJSU	Charles Pauley 5–yard run (Nick Gilliam kick)	NEV 14–10
2	00:53	SJSU	Tuati Wooden 22–yard pass from Scott Rislov (Nick Gilliam kick)	SJSU 17–14
3	10:45	NEV	Maurice Mann 13–yard pass from Zack Threadgill (Damon Fine kick)	NEV 21–17
3	04:14	NEV	Damon Fine 37–yard field goal	NEV 24–17
3	00:38	NEV	Nate Burleson 27–yard pass from Zack Threadgill (Damon Fine kick)	NEV 31–17
4	11:38	SJSU	Lance Martin 2–yard run (Nick Gilliam kick)	NEV 31–24
4	07:22	NEV	Matt Milton 31–yard run (Damon Fine kick)	NEV 38–24
4	06:27	NEV	Keone Kauo 21–yard interception (Damon Fine kick)	NEV 45–24
4	04:29	NEV	Matt Milton 71–yard run (Damon Fine kick)	NEV 52–24

=== At Louisiana Tech ===
Nevada at Louisiana Tech

Team	1	2	3	4	Total
Wolf Pack	14	13	7	13	47
• Bulldogs	10	13	21	6	50

- Date: October 26, 2002
- Location: Joe Aillet Stadium
  Ruston, LA
- Game start: 2:00 p.m. CDT
- Elapsed time: N/A
- Game attendance: 15,315
- Game weather: Temperature: 60 °F (16 °C) • Weather: Overcast and Drizzle • Wind: N/A
- Referee: Daniel Romeo
- TV announcers (None): None

Scoring summary
1	13:02	LATECH	Josh Scobee 23–yard field goal	LATECH 3–0
1	09:48	NEV	Nate Burleson 14–yard pass from Zack Threadgill (Damon Fine kick)	NEV 7–3
1	07:45	LATECH	Joe Smith 9–yard run (Josh Scobee kick)	LATECH 10–7
1	02:23	NEV	Matt Milton 2–yard run (Damon Fine kick)	NEV 14–10
2	14:20	LATECH	Major Richmond 36–yard pass from Luke McCown (Josh Scobee kick blocked)	LATECH 16–14
2	11:10	NEV	Matt Milton 3–yard run (Zack Threadgill pass failed)	NEV 20–16
2	05:41	NEV	Matt Milton 3–yard run (Damon Fine kick)	NEV 27–16
2	03:38	LATECH	Joe Smith 15–yard run (Josh Scobee kick)	NEV 27–23
3	14:37	LATECH	Ahmad Harris 73–yard pass from Luke McCown (Josh Scobee kick)	LATECH 30–27
3	06:11	NEV	Maurice Mann 10–yard pass from Zack Threadgill (Damon Fine kick)	NEV 34–30
3	03:22	LATECH	D.J. Curry 14–yard pass from Luke McCown (Josh Scobee kick)	LATECH 37–34
3	01:28	LATECH	Corey Brazil 49–yard interception (Josh Scobee kick)	LATECH 44–34
4	14:09	NEV	Matt Milton 1–yard run (Damon Fine kick)	LATECH 44–41
4	12:17	LATECH	Joe Smith 3–yard run (Josh Scobee kick failed)	LATECH 50–41
4	01:20	NEV	Nichiren Flowers 20–yard pass from Zack Threadgill (Damon Fine kick failed)	LATECH 50–47

=== At SMU ===
Nevada at SMU

Team	1	2	3	4	Total
• Wolf Pack	0	0	3	21	24
Mustangs	0	0	0	6	6

- Date: November 2, 2002
- Location: Gerald J. Ford Stadium
  University Park, TX
- Game start: 2:10 p.m. CST
- Elapsed time: 2 hours and 59 minutes
- Game attendance: 11,832
- Game weather: Temperature: 52 °F (11 °C) • Weather: Cloudy and 76% Humidity • Wind: E 6 MPH
- Referee: Bill Athan
- TV announcers (KRNV): N/A

Scoring summary
3	13:27	NEV	Damon Fine 45–yard field goal	NEV 3–0
4	14:46	NEV	Nate Burleson 4–yard pass from Zack Threadgill (Damon Fine kick)	NEV 10–0
4	07:54	SMU	Kris Briggs 5–yard run (Trent Stephenson kick failed)	NEV 10–6
4	02:58	NEV	Nichiren Flowers 29–yard pass from Zack Threadgill (Damon Fine kick)	NEV 17–6
4	02:38	NEV	Craig Bailey 29–yard interception (Damon Fine kick)	NEV 24–6

=== UTEP ===
UTEP at Nevada

Team	1	2	3	4	Total
Miners	0	17	0	0	17
• Wolf Pack	0	14	6	3	23

- Date: November 9, 2002
- Location: Mackay Stadium
  Reno, NV
- Game start: 12:05 p.m. PST
- Elapsed time: 3 hours and 2 minutes
- Game attendance: 13,721
- Game weather: Temperature: 51 °F (11 °C) • Weather: Partly Cloudy and Cool • Wind: 20 MPH
- Referee: Frank White
- TV announcers (None): None

Scoring summary
2	12:12	UTEP	Sherman Austin 26–yard pass from Omar Duarte (Keith Robinson kick)	UTEP 7–0
2	10:27	NEV	B.J. Mitchell 4–yard run (Damon Fine kick)	TIE 7–7
2	06:56	UTEP	Omar Duarte 5–yard run (Keith Robinson kick)	UTEP 14–7
2	04:35	NEV	Nate Burleson 11–yard pass from Zack Threadgill (Damon Fine kick)	TIE 14–14
2	00:00	UTEP	Keith Robinson 54–yard field goal	UTEP 17–14
3	11:07	NEV	Bill Lynch 4–yard pass from Zack Threadgill (Damon Fine kick failed)	NEV 20–17
4	13:34	NEV	Damon Fine 32–yard field goal	NEV 23–17

=== At Fresno State ===
Nevada at Fresno State

Team	1	2	3	4	Total
Wolf Pack	10	0	0	20	30
• Bulldogs	3	14	14	7	38

- Date: November 16, 2002
- Location: Bulldog Stadium
  Fresno, CA
- Game start: 4:08 p.m. PST
- Elapsed time: 3 hours and 37 minutes
- Game attendance: 40,866
- Game weather: Temperature: 67 °F (19 °C) • Weather: Partly Cloudy and Hazy • Wind: Light
- Referee: Paul Labenne
- TV announcers (KRNV): N/A

Scoring summary
1	10:45	FS	Asen Asparuhov 37–yard field goal	FS 3–0
1	05:39	NEV	Matt Milton 1–yard run (Damon Fine kick)	NEV 7–3
1	00:36	NEV	Damon Fine 36–yard field goal	NEV 10–3
2	10:02	FS	Bryson Sumlin 5–yard run (Asen Asparuhov kick)	TIE 10–10
2	00:10	FS	Marque Davis 17–yard pass from Paul Pinegar (Asen Asparuhov kick)	FS 17–10
3	12:18	FS	Cameron Worrell 62–yard interception (Asen Asparuhov kick)	FS 24–10
3	10:23	FS	Dee Meza 60–yard interception (Asen Asparuhov kick)	FS 31–10
4	14:46	NEV	Nate Burleson 4–yard run (Damon Fine kick)	FS 31–17
4	08:30	NEV	Nate Burleson 18–yard pass from Zack Threadgill (Damon Fine pass failed)	FS 31–23
4	03:04	FS	James Cummings 12–yard run (Asen Asparuhov kick)	FS 38–23
4	02:06	NEV	Nate Burleson 45–yard pass from Zack Threadgill (Damon Fine kick)	FS 38–30

=== Boise State ===
Boise State at Nevada
(rivalry)

Team	1	2	3	4	Total
• No. 23 Broncos	17	10	10	7	44
Wolf Pack	0	0	0	7	7

- Date: November 23, 2002
- Location: Mackay Stadium
  Reno, NV
- Game start: 12:07 p.m. PST
- Elapsed time: 3 hours and 4 minutes
- Game attendance: 20,247
- Game weather: Temperature: 58 °F (14 °C) • Weather: Clear • Wind: Light
- Referee: Rich Kollen
- TV announcers (None): None

Scoring summary
1	10:46	BSU	Brock Forsey 4–yard run (Nick Calaycay kick)	BSU 7–0
1	07:34	BSU	Brock Forsey 2–yard run (Nick Calaycay kick)	BSU 14–0
1	00:00	BSU	Nick Calaycay 21–yard field goal	BSU 17–0
2	11:04	BSU	Brock Forsey 1–yard run (Nick Calaycay kick)	BSU 24–0
2	00:30	BSU	Nick Calaycay 28–yard field goal	BSU 27–0
3	11:18	BSU	Jay Swillie 5–yard pass from Ryan Dinwiddie (Nick Calaycay kick)	BSU 34–0
3	05:15	BSU	Nick Calaycay 32–yard field goal	BSU 37–0
4	14:42	BSU	Brock Forsey 38–yard run (Nick Calaycay kick)	BSU 44–0
4	05:31	NEV	Nate Burleson 17–yard pass from Jeff Rowe (Damon Fine kick)	BSU 44–7

== Roster ==
2002 Nevada Wolf Pack football team roster
Players
Coaches
Offense

Pos.	#	Name	Class
QB	5	Jeff Rowe	Fr
WR	12	Aaron Carter	Sr
QB	13	Andy Heiser	So
QB	14	Zack Threadgill	Sr
QB	16	Travis Moore	Fr
OL	58	Joel Primus	Fr
OT	59	Harvey Dahl	So
OT	60	Joe Andrews	So
OL	62	Cody Jackson	Fr
G	62	Chris Hines	So
OL	63	Clayton Madole	Jr
OL	64	Adam Garica	Fr
C	66	Cody Johnson	Sr
G	67	John Tennert	Jr
OT	68	Adam Kiefer	Fr
OL	70	Barrett Reznick	Fr
C	71	Steve Church	Jr
G	72	Nick Schneider	Fr
G	73	Tony Willis	Fr
OT	77	Alan Parker	Jr
OL	77	Kyle Gosselin	Fr
G	79	Isaiah Ross	Jr
WR	80	Nate Burleson	Jr
WR	81	Maurice Mann	Jr
WR	82	Gary Snyder, Jr.	Fr
TE	83	Anthony Pudewell	Fr
WR	84	Nichiren Flowers	Fr
TE	85	Bill Lynch	Sr
TE	86	Tony Moll	Fr
TE	87	R. J. Marsh	Jr
TE	89	Erick Streelman	Sr

Defense

Pos.	#	Name	Class
FS	6	Ronnie Hardiman	Jr
CB	7	Aaron Dean	Sr
CB	8	Marlon McLaughlin	So
DE	55	Jorge Cordova	Jr
DT	65	Sean Folweiler	Sr

Special teams

Pos.	#	Name	Class

Head coach

- Chris Tormey

Coordinators/assistant coaches

Legend

- (C) Team captain
- (S) Suspended
- (I) Ineligible
- Injured
- Redshirt

Roster

== Team players in the NFL ==
Player	Position	Round	Pick	NFL club
Nate Burleson	Wide receiver	3	71	Minnesota Vikings
