= 2000 Nevada Wolf Pack football team =

American college football season

2000 Nevada Wolf Pack football
- Conference: Western Athletic Conference
- Record: 2–10 (1–7 WAC)
- Head coach: Chris Tormey (1st season)
- Offensive coordinator: Phil Earley (1st season)
- Offensive scheme: Spread
- Defensive coordinator: Jeff Mills (1st season)
- Base defense: 3–4
- Home stadium: Mackay Stadium

2000 Western Athletic Conference football standings
	Conf.			Overall
Team	W		L	W		L
No. 21 TCU +	7	–	1	10	–	2
UTEP +	7	–	1	8	–	4
Fresno State	6	–	2	7	–	5
San Jose State	5	–	3	7	–	5
Tulsa	4	–	4	5	–	7
Rice	2	–	6	3	–	8
Hawaii	2	–	6	3	–	9
SMU	2	–	6	3	–	9
Nevada	1	–	7	2	–	10
+ – Conference co-champions; Rankings from AP Poll

The 2000 Nevada Wolf Pack football team represented the University of Nevada, Reno during the 2000 NCAA Division I-A football season. Nevada competed as a first-year member of the Western Athletic Conference (WAC). The Wolf Pack were led by first-year head coach Chris Tormey and played their home games at Mackay Stadium.

== Schedule ==
Date	Time	Opponent	Site	TV	Result	Attendance
September 2	12:30 p.m.	at Oregon*	Autzen Stadium; Eugene, OR		L 7–36	43,371
September 9	1:00 p.m.	No. 22 TCU	Mackay Stadium; Reno, NV	ESPN Plus	L 10–41	19,797
September 23	7:00 p.m.	at Wyoming*	War Memorial Stadium; Laramie, WY		W 35–28	13,754
September 30	1:00 p.m.	Colorado State*	Mackay Stadium; Reno, NV		L 14–45	19,003
October 7	7:00 p.m.	at UNLV*	Sam Boyd Stadium; Whitney, NV (Fremont Cannon)		L 7–38	27,578
October 14	7:00 p.m.	at Fresno State	Bulldog Stadium; Fresno, CA		L 21–58	41,128
October 21	1:00 p.m.	San Jose State^{†}	Mackay Stadium; Reno, NV		L 30–49	17,555
October 28	9:00 a.m.	at SMU	Gerald J. Ford Stadium; University Park, TX		L 7–21	14,747
November 4	12:00 p.m.	UTEP	Mackay Stadium; Reno, NV		L 22–45	15,249
November 11	8:00 p.m.	at Hawaii	Aloha Stadium; Halawa, HI		L 17–37	33,731
November 18	12:00 p.m.	Rice	Mackay Stadium; Reno, NV		W 34–28	13,482
November 25	12:00 p.m.	at Tulsa	Skelly Stadium; Tulsa, OK		L 3–38	15,024
*Non-conference game; ^{†}Homecoming; Rankings from AP Poll released prior to the game; All times are in Pacific time

== Game summaries ==
=== At Oregon ===
Nevada at Oregon

Team	1	2	3	4	Total
Wolf Pack	0	7	0	0	7
• Ducks	5	10	7	14	36

- Date: September 2, 2000
- Location: Autzen Stadium
  Eugene, OR
- Game start: 12:35 p.m. PDT
- Elapsed time: 3 hours and 10 minutes
- Game attendance: 43,371
- Game weather: Temperature: 60 °F (16 °C) • Weather: Rain • Wind: S 10–15 MPH
- Referee: Pat Flood
- TV announcers (None): None

Scoring summary
1	07:13	ORE	Team 10–yard safety	ORE 2–0
1	03:14	ORE	Josh Frankel 43–yard field goal	ORE 5–0
2	13:05	ORE	Josh Frankel 35–yard field goal	ORE 8–0
2	08:15	ORE	Maurice Morris 66–yard run (Josh Frankel kick)	ORE 15–0
2	05:05	NEV	Nate Burleson 21–yard pass from David Neill (Mike Phillips kick)	ORE 15–7
3	05:51	ORE	Joey Harrington 1–yard run (Josh Frankel kick)	ORE 22–7
4	13:10	ORE	Adam Kennybrew 2–yard run (Josh Frankel kick)	ORE 29–7
4	03:01	ORE	Kenny Washington 4–yard run (Josh Frankel kick)	ORE 36–7

=== TCU ===
TCU at Nevada

Team	1	2	3	4	Total
• No. 22 Horned Frogs	14	14	13	0	41
Wolf Pack	7	0	3	0	10

- Date: September 9, 2000
- Location: Mackay Stadium
  Reno, NV
- Game start: 1:05 p.m. PDT
- Elapsed time: 3 hours and 15 minutes
- Game attendance: 19,797
- Game weather: Temperature: 76 °F (24 °C) • Weather: Mostly Sunny • Wind: None
- Referee: Frank White
- TV announcers (ESPN+): N/A

Scoring summary
1	12:26	TCU	LaDainian Tomlinson 1–yard run (Chris Kaylakie kick)	TCU 7–0
1	10:22	TCU	LaVar Veale 85–yard punt return (Chris Kaylakie kick)	TCU 14–0
1	02:06	NEV	Adrien Dugas 1–yard run (Mike Phillips kick)	TCU 14–7
2	12:24	TCU	George Layne 28–yard run (Chris Kaylakie kick)	TCU 21–7
2	07:43	TCU	LaDainian Tomlinson 8–yard run (Chris Kaylakie kick)	TCU 28–7
3	11:27	NEV	Mike Phillips 29–yard field goal	TCU 28–10
3	11:11	TCU	LaTarence Dunbar 95–yard kickoff return (Chris Kaylakie kick)	TCU 35–10
3	01:30	TCU	LaDainian Tomlinson 43–yard run (Matt Schobel pass failed)	TCU 41–10

=== At Wyoming ===
Nevada at Wyoming

Team	1	2	3	4	Total
• Wolf Pack	0	10	3	22	35
Cowboys	14	7	0	7	28

- Date: September 23, 2000
- Location: War Memorial Stadium
  Laramie, WY
- Game start: 8:07 p.m. MDT
- Elapsed time: 3 hours and 23 minutes
- Game attendance: 13,754
- Game weather: Temperature: 27 °F (−3 °C) • Weather: Cold and Scattered Snow • Wind: E 15 MPH
- Referee: Gene Semko
- TV announcers (None): None

Scoring summary
1	08:13	WYO	Brett Ralph 35–yard run (Aaron Elling kick)	WYO 7–0
1	00:29	WYO	Brock Ralph 18–yard pass from Jay Stoner (Aaron Elling kick)	WYO 14–0
2	13:29	NEV	David Neill 28–yard run (Mike Phillips kick)	WYO 14–7
2	12:13	WYO	Brett Ralph 12–yard pass from Jay Stoner (Aaron Elling kick)	WYO 21–7
2	00:00	NEV	Mike Phillips 41–yard field goal	WYO 21–10
3	02:31	NEV	Mike Phillips 24–yard field goal	WYO 21–13
4	13:12	NEV	David Neill 1–yard run (Jermaine Brown pass)	TIE 21–21
4	11:57	NEV	Scott Asai 4–yard pass from David Neill (Mike Phillips kick)	NEV 28–21
4	05:54	WYO	Ryan McGuffey 5–yard pass from Jay Stoner (Aaron Elling kick)	TIE 28–28
4	00:41	NEV	Marquis Starks 16–yard run (Mike Phillips kick)	NEV 35–28

=== Colorado State ===
Colorado State at Nevada

Team	1	2	3	4	Total
• Rams	14	17	7	7	45
Wolf Pack	7	0	0	7	14

- Date: September 30, 2000
- Location: Mackay Stadium
  Reno, NV
- Game start: 1:07 p.m. PDT
- Elapsed time: 3 hours and 21 minutes
- Game attendance: 19,003
- Game weather: Temperature: 83 °F (28 °C) • Weather: Mostly Sunny • Wind: W 10–15 MPH
- Referee: Ken Flaherty
- TV announcers (None): None

Scoring summary
1	14:42	NEV	Nate Burleson 80–yard pass from David Neill (Mike Phillips kick)	NEV 7–0
1	07:58	CSU	Pete Rebstock 66–yard punt return (C.W. Hurst kick)	TIE 7–7
1	04:30	CSU	Cory Woolstenhulme 8–yard pass from Matt Newton (C.W. Hurst kick)	CSU 14–7
2	12:50	CSU	Cecil Sapp 13–yard run (C.W. Hurst kick)	CSU 21–7
2	03:11	CSU	Rahsaan Sanders 3–yard run (C.W. Hurst kick)	CSU 28–7
2	00:03	CSU	C.W. Hurst 36–yard field goal	CSU 31–7
3	04:36	CSU	Duan Ruff 7–yard run (C.W. Hurst kick)	CSU 38–7
4	14:05	NEV	Tim Fleming 51–yard pass from David Neill (Mike Phillips kick)	CSU 38–14
4	07:52	CSU	Duan Ruff 1–yard run (C.W. Hurst kick)	CSU 45–14

=== At UNLV ===
Nevada at UNLV
(Battle for the Fremont Cannon)

Team	1	2	3	4	Total
Wolf Pack	7	0	0	0	7
• Rebels	14	7	10	7	38

- Date: October 7, 2000
- Location: Sam Boyd Stadium
  Whitney, NV
- Game start: 7:00 p.m. PDT
- Elapsed time: 3 hours and 20 minutes
- Game attendance: 27,578
- Game weather: Temperature: 88 °F (31 °C) • Weather: Balmy and Partly Cloudy • Wind: N 0–5 MPH
- Referee: Jim Harvey
- TV announcers (None): None

Scoring summary
1	09:08	UNLV	Kevin Brown 1–yard run (Ray Cheetany kick)	UNLV 7–0
1	01:35	NEV	Jermaine Brown 30–yard pass from David Neill (Mike Phillips kick)	TIE 7–7
1	00:39	UNLV	Nate Turner 37–yard pass from Jason Thomas (Ray Cheetany kick)	UNLV 14–7
2	00:01	UNLV	Jason Thomas 1–yard run (Ray Cheetany kick)	UNLV 21–7
3	10:52	UNLV	Jason Thomas 1–yard run (Ray Cheetany kick)	UNLV 28–7
3	07:21	UNLV	Ray Cheetany 30–yard field goal	UNLV 31–7
4	07:22	UNLV	Nate Turner 19–yard pass from Jason Thomas (Ray Cheetany kick)	UNLV 38–7

=== At Fresno State ===
Nevada at Fresno State

Team	1	2	3	4	Total
Wolf Pack	0	7	6	8	21
• Bulldogs	27	17	7	7	58

- Date: October 14, 2000
- Location: Bulldog Stadium
  Fresno, CA
- Game start: 7:07 p.m. PDT
- Elapsed time: 3 hours and 30 minutes
- Game attendance: 41,128
- Game weather: Temperature: 64 °F (18 °C) • Weather: Clear • Wind: Light
- Referee: Rich Kollen
- TV announcers (None): None

Scoring summary
1	09:42	FS	David Carr 1–yard run (Asen Asparuhov kick)	FS 7–0
1	08:33	FS	Dante Marsh 27–yard interception (Asen Asparuhov kick failed)	FS 13–0
1	04:47	FS	Derrick Ward 2–yard run (Asen Asparuhov kick)	FS 20–0
1	02:37	FS	Derrick Ward 1–yard run (Asen Asparuhov kick)	FS 27–0
2	11:49	NEV	Scott Asai 4–yard pass from David Neill (Mike Phillips kick)	FS 27–7
2	05:22	FS	Asen Asparuhov 42–yard field goal	FS 30–7
2	02:21	FS	Bernard Berrian 88–yard punt return (Asen Asparuhov kick)	FS 37–7
2	00:49	FS	Paris Gaines 1–yard run (Asen Asparuhov kick)	FS 44–7
3	14:03	FS	Bernard Berrian 55–yard pass from Jeff Grady (Asen Asparuhov kick)	FS 51–7
3	05:30	NEV	David Neill 10–yard run (pass failed)	FS 51–13
4	05:05	NEV	Nate Burleson 4–yard pass from David Neill (Nate Burleson pass)	FS 51–21
4	01:37	FS	Kendall Edwards 10–yard fumble recovery (Asen Asparuhov kick)	FS 58–21

=== San Jose State ===
San Jose State at Nevada

Team	1	2	3	4	Total
• Spartans	7	8	6	28	49
Wolf Pack	9	0	7	14	30

- Date: October 21, 2000
- Location: Mackay Stadium
  Reno, NV
- Game start: 1:05 p.m. PDT
- Elapsed time: 3 hours and 15 minutes
- Game attendance: 17,555
- Game weather: Temperature: 48 °F (9 °C) • Weather: Mostly Cloudy • Wind: Breezy
- Referee: Frank White
- TV announcers (None): None

Scoring summary
1	09:19	NEV	Team 14–yard safety	NEV 2–0
1	04:46	NEV	Humphrey Garrett 26–yard fumble recovery (Mike Phillips kick)	NEV 9–0
1	02:51	SJSU	Marcus Arroyo 4–yard run (Nick Gilliam kick)	NEV 9–7
2	11:25	SJSU	Jarmar Julien 1–yard run (Casey LeBlanc rush)	SJSU 15–9
3	08:48	NEV	Nate Burleson 24–yard pass from David Neill (Mike Phillips kick)	NEV 16–15
3	04:24	SJSU	Deonce Whitaker 2–yard run (rush failed)	SJSU 21–16
4	11:07	SJSU	Deonce Whitaker 3–yard run (Nick Gilliam kick)	SJSU 28–16
4	08:43	NEV	Nate Burleson 31–yard pass from David Neill (Mike Phillips kick)	SJSU 28–23
4	08:01	SJSU	Jarmar Julien 6–yard run (Nick Gilliam kick)	SJSU 35–23
4	02:41	SJSU	Jarmar Julien 4–yard run (Nick Gilliam kick)	SJSU 42–23
4	01:34	NEV	Mo Jones 22–yard pass from David Neill (Mike Phillips kick)	SJSU 42–30
4	00:41	SJSU	Jarmar Julien 4–yard run (Nick Gilliam kick)	SJSU 49–30

=== At SMU ===
Nevada at SMU

Team	1	2	3	4	Total
Wolf Pack	0	0	7	0	7
• Mustangs	7	7	0	7	21

- Date: October 28, 2000
- Location: Gerald J. Ford Stadium
  University Park, TX
- Game start: 11:00 a.m. CDT
- Elapsed time: 3 hours and 14 minutes
- Game attendance: 14,747
- Game weather: Temperature: 72 °F (22 °C) • Weather: Clouds and 77% Humidity • Wind: S 10–12 MPH
- Referee: Gene Semko
- TV announcers (None): None

Scoring summary
1	10:32	SMU	Johnnie Freeman 19–yard run (Jacob Crowley kick)	SMU 7–0
2	00:21	SMU	Johnnie Freeman 31–yard pass from David Page (Jacob Crowley kick)	SMU 14–0
3	10:41	NEV	Nate Burleson 44–yard pass from Brett Staninger (Mike Phillips kick)	SMU 14–7
4	04:01	SMU	Johnnie Freeman 20–yard pass from David Page (Jacob Crowley kick)	SMU 21–7

=== UTEP ===
UTEP at Nevada

Team	1	2	3	4	Total
• Miners	28	7	3	7	45
Wolf Pack	0	7	9	6	22

- Date: November 4, 2000
- Location: Mackay Stadium
  Reno, NV
- Game start: 12:05 p.m. PST
- Elapsed time: 3 hours and 33 minutes
- Game attendance: 15,249
- Game weather: Temperature: 58 °F (14 °C) • Weather: High Clouds • Wind: Slight
- Referee: Rich Kollen
- TV announcers (None): None

Scoring summary
1	09:37	UTEP	Brian Natkin 3–yard pass from Rocky Perez (Ricky Bishop kick)	UTEP 7–0
1	09:08	UTEP	Lee Mays 43–yard pass from Rocky Perez (Ricky Bishop kick)	UTEP 14–0
1	07:50	UTEP	Rocky Perez 1–yard run (Ricky Bishop kick)	UTEP 21–0
1	01:38	UTEP	Rocky Perez 1–yard run (Ricky Bishop kick)	UTEP 28–0
2	04:59	NEV	T. W. Cunningham 16–yard pass from Brett Staninger (Mike Phillips kick)	UTEP 28–7
2	00:22	UTEP	Javier Sanchez 1–yard run (Ricky Bishop kick)	UTEP 35–7
3	07:23	UTEP	Rocky Bishop 35–yard field goal	UTEP 38–7
3	04:02	NEV	Jesse Twist 2–yard run (Brett Staninger pass failed)	UTEP 38–13
3	00:32	NEV	Mike Phillips 20–yard field goal	UTEP 38–16
4	11:07	NEV	Nate Burleson 31–yard pass from Brett Staninger (pass failed)	UTEP 38–22
4	00:14	UTEP	Javier Sanchez 3–yard run (Ricky Bishop kick)	UTEP 45–22

=== At Hawaii ===
Nevada at Hawaii

Team	1	2	3	4	Total
Wolf Pack	0	10	0	7	17
• Warriors	3	14	7	13	37

- Date: November 11, 2000
- Location: Aloha Stadium
  Halawa, HI
- Game start: 6:07 p.m.
- Elapsed time: 3 hours and 43 minutes
- Game attendance: 33,731
- Game weather: Temperature: 74 °F (23 °C) • Weather: Mostly Cloudy • Wind: TR 10–25 MPH
- Referee: Jim Harvey
- TV announcers (None): None

Scoring summary
1	00:43	UH	Eric Hannum 42–yard field goal	UH 3–0
2	11:34	NEV	Mike Phillips 37–yard field goal	TIE 3–3
2	07:19	NEV	Mo Jones 22–yard pass from David Neill (Mike Phillips kick)	NEV 10–3
2	06:18	UH	Ashley Lelie 45–yard pass from Timmy Chang (Eric Hannum kick)	TIE 10–10
2	02:17	UH	James Fenderson 2–yard run (Eric Hannum kick)	UH 17–10
3	02:01	UH	James Fenderson 3–yard run (Eric Hannum kick)	UH 24–10
4	09:54	UH	Ashley Lelie 8–yard pass from Timmy Chang (Eric Hannum pass failed)	UH 30–10
4	04:35	NEV	Tim Fleming 19–yard pass from David Neill (Mike Phillips kick)	UH 30–17
4	01:40	UH	Thero Mitchell Jr. 26–yard run (Eric Hannum kick)	UH 37–17

=== Rice ===
Rice at Nevada

Team	1	2	3	4	Total
Owls	7	0	7	14	28
• Wolf Pack	14	10	0	10	34

- Date: November 18, 2000
- Location: Mackay Stadium
  Reno, NV
- Game start: 12:05 p.m. PST
- Elapsed time: 3 hours and 17 minutes
- Game attendance: 13,482
- Game weather: Temperature: 51 °F (11 °C) • Weather: Clear and Sunny • Wind: None
- Referee: Bill Athan
- TV announcers (None): None

Scoring summary
1	11:26	NEV	Marquis Starks 10–yard run (Mike Phillips kick)	NEV 7–0
1	06:43	NEV	Marquis Starks 4–yard run (Mike Phillips kick)	NEV 14–0
1	03:04	RICE	Robbie Beck 3–yard run (Derek Crabtree kick)	NEV 14–7
2	00:53	NEV	Mike Phillips 30–yard field goal	NEV 17–7
2	00:08	NEV	David Neill 9–yard run (Mike Phillips kick)	NEV 24–7
3	07:02	RICE	Kyle Herm 1–yard run (Derek Crabtree kick)	NEV 24–14
4	11:16	RICE	Jamie Tyler 4–yard run (Derek Crabtree kick)	NEV 24–21
4	07:50	NEV	Nate Burleson 14–yard pass from David Neill (Mike Phillips kick)	NEV 31–21
4	02:35	RICE	Jamie Tyler 3–yard run (Derek Crabtree kick)	NEV 31–28
4	01:02	NEV	Mike Phillips 42–yard field goal	NEV 34–28

=== At Tulsa ===
Nevada at Tulsa

Team	1	2	3	4	Total
Wolf Pack	0	0	3	0	3
• Golden Hurricane	14	10	0	14	38

- Date: November 25, 2000
- Location: Skelly Stadium
  Tulsa, OK
- Game start: 2:00 p.m. CST
- Elapsed time: 2 hours and 50 minutes
- Game attendance: 15,024
- Game weather: N/A
- Referee: Cooper Castleberry
- TV announcers (None): None

Scoring summary
1	09:06	TULSA	Donald Shoals 15–yard pass from Josh Blankenship (Chris Earnest kick)	TULSA 7–0
1	03:09	TULSA	Ken Bohanon 1–yard run (Chris Earnest kick)	TULSA 14–0
2	09:32	TULSA	Donald Shoals 9–yard pass from Josh Blankenship (Chris Earnest kick)	TULSA 21–0
2	05:32	TULSA	Chris Earnest 30–yard field goal	TULSA 24–0
3	13:03	NEV	Mike Phillips 34–yard field goal	TULSA 24–3
4	13:43	TULSA	Ken Bohanon 2–yard run (Chris Earnest kick)	TULSA 31–3
4	06:10	TULSA	Keith Carey 7–yard pass from Michael Wall (Chris Earnest kick)	TULSA 38–3

== Roster ==
2000 Nevada Wolf Pack football team roster
Players			Coaches
Offense: Pos. / # / Name / Class; WR / 80 / Nate Burleson / Fr	Defense: Pos. / # / Name / Class	Special teams: Pos. / # / Name / Class	Head coach: Chris Tormey; Coordinators/assistant coaches Legend: (C) Team captain; (S) Suspended; (I) Ineligible; Injured; Redshirt
