= Lucius Floyd =

American gridiron football player (born 1966)

Profile
- Position: Running back

Personal information
- Born: September 7, 1966 (age 60); Inglewood, California, U.S.

Career information
- College: University of Nevada, Reno

Career history
- 1990–93: Saskatchewan Roughriders
- 1993–95: Edmonton Eskimos
- 1995: Memphis Mad Dogs

Awards and highlights
- Grey Cup champion (1993); Jackie Parker Trophy (1990)

Lucius Floyd (born September 7, 1966) is a former Grey Cup champion and award-winning running back in the Canadian Football League (CFL).

Floyd played his college football at University of Nevada, Reno. He teamed with Charvez Foger, to form one of the school's most explosive running back combinations. In 1986, he rushed for 1066 yards, 305 of them coming in a single-game against Montana State University on September 27 (second highest total in school history).

He joined the CFL's Saskatchewan Roughriders in 1990, and his 421 rushing yards and 73 catches for 811 yards (and 5 touchdowns) won him the Jackie Parker Trophy for best rookie in the Western Conference. In 1991, he rushed for 677 yards and in 1992 another 373 yards (and 1471 in total as a Green Rider), but he was traded to the Edmonton Eskimos part way thru the 1993 season. Good fortune shined on Floyd, as he starred in the Esks' 1993 Grey Cup championship, scoring a touchdown.

He played 2 more seasons in Edmonton, and he had a 100-yard touchdown reception on July 7, 1995, against Saskatchewan, and his 2606 all purpose yards in 1994 are second only to Gizmo Williams in team history. He finished his career in 1995 with the Memphis Mad Dogs where he rushed for 21 yards.
