= Damond Wilkins =

American football player (born 1974)

Profile
- Position: Wide receiver

Personal information
- Born: April 23, 1974 (age 52)
- Listed height: 6 ft 1 in (1.85 m)
- Listed weight: 190 lb (86 kg)

Career information
- High school: Eisenhower (Rialto, California)
- College: Nevada
- NFL draft: 1997: undrafted

Career history
- Arizona Rattlers (1998)*; New England Sea Wolves (1999)
- * Offseason or practice squad member only

Awards and highlights
- NCAA receptions leader (1996)
- Stats at ArenaFan.com

Damond Wilkins (born April 23, 1974) is an American former football wide receiver. He played college football for the Nevada Wolf Pack and led the country in receptions in 1996.

== Early life ==
Damond Wilkins was born on April 23, 1974. He played high school football at Eisenhower High School in Rialto, California.

== College career ==
Wilkins played junior college football at San Bernardino Valley College. He later transferred to the University of Nevada, Reno, where he was a two-year letterman for the Wolf Pack from 1995 to 1996. In 1995, he recorded 51 receptions for 754 yards and six touchdowns, two rushes for two yards, and 13 punt returns for 111 yards. Wilkins caught 114 passes for 1,121 yards and four touchdowns in 1996 while also rushing 18 times for 114 yards and three touchdowns. His 114 receptions were the most in the country.

== Professional career ==
Wilkins was not selected in the 1997 NFL draft. He signed with the Arizona Rattlers of the Arena Football League (AFL) for the 1998 AFL season. He was released in late April 1998, before the start of the regular season.

Wilkins played in two games for the New England Sea Wolves of the AFL in 1999 as an offensive specialist, totaling nine catches for 103 yards and two touchdowns, four carries for seven yards and three touchdowns, and two kick returns for 50 yards.

== Personal life ==
Wilkins' cousin, Demond Thompkins, played college football at UNLV from 1991 to 1993, catching 142 passes for 2,396 yards and 17 touchdowns.

== See also ==
- List of NCAA major college football yearly receiving leaders
- NCAA Division I FBS receiving leaders
- Nevada Wolf Pack football statistical leaders
