= Mike Maxwell (American football) =

American football player

Profile
- Position: Quarterback

Career information
- High school: Temecula Valley (Temecula, California)
- College: Nevada
- NFL draft: 1996: undrafted

Career history
- Buffalo Bills (1996)*
- * Offseason or practice squad member only

Awards and highlights
- NCAA passing touchdowns leader (1994); NCAA passing yards leader (1995); Big West Offensive Player of the Year (1994)

Mike Maxwell is an American former football quarterback. He played college football for the Nevada Wolf Pack, and signed with the Buffalo Bills as an undrafted free agent in 1996.

== Early life ==
Maxwell played high school football at Temecula Valley High School in Temecula, California. He earned All-CIF honors as a senior quarterback.

== College career ==
Maxwell first enrolled at Riverside Community College before transferring to San Bernardino Junior College. He had an impressive season at San Bernardino, which led to a scholarship offer from the University of Nevada, Reno. He played for the Nevada Wolf Pack from 1993 to 1995. Maxwell played in three games in 1993 as the backup to Chris Vargas, completing 12 of 25 passes for 108 yards and one interception. Maxwell took over as starter in 1994 after Vargas graduated. He completed 271 of 447 passes (60.6%) for 3,537 yards, 29 touchdowns, and 15 interceptions while also rushing for three touchdowns. His 29 passing touchdowns were the most in the country, and he was named the Big West Conference Offensive Player of the Year. As a senior in 1995, Maxwell recorded 277 completions on 409 attempts (67.7%) for 3,611 yards, 33 touchdowns, and 17 interceptions. He led the country in completions, completion percentage, and passing yards. He threw seven touchdowns in a game twice during the 1995 season. The Wolf Pack led the nation in total offense during both of Maxwell's seasons as starter. Maxwell was inducted into the University of Nevada Athletics Hall of Fame in 2012.

== Professional career ==
Maxwell signed with the Buffalo Bills after going undrafted in the 1996 NFL draft. He was among the final cuts in August 1996.

== Personal life ==
Maxwell began volunteering as a football coach at Santa Margarita Catholic High School in 1999. He became the school's dean of students in 2003.
