= Trevor Insley =

American gridiron football player (born 1977)

Profile
- Position: Wide receiver

Personal information
- Born: December 25, 1977 (age 48); San Clemente, California, U.S.
- Listed height: 6 ft 0 in (1.83 m)
- Listed weight: 190 lb (86 kg)

Career information
- High school: San Clemente
- College: Nevada
- NFL draft: 2000: undrafted

Career history
- Indianapolis Colts (2000)*; Barcelona Dragons (2001); Indianapolis Colts (2001); Houston Texans (2002); Ottawa Renegades (2003)
- * Offseason or practice squad member only

Awards and highlights
- Second-team All-American (1999); 2× First-team All-Big West (1998, 1999)

Career NFL statistics
- Receptions: 14
- Receiving yards: 165
- Receiving average: 11.8
- Receiving touchdowns: 1
- Stats at Pro Football Reference

Trevor Insley (born December 25, 1977) is an American former professional football player who was a wide receiver in the National Football League (NFL). He played college football for the Nevada Wolf Pack from 1996 to 1999. Insley is the only player in NCAA Division I-A history to gain 2,000 receiving yards in a single season. He is one of two players in all division NCAA history to hold this distinction.

Insley holds the current records for receiving yards (2,060 as a senior) and receiving yards per game (187.3 as a senior) at the Division I-A level. Insley possesses the second most career receiving yards in Division I-A history with 5,005 yards. His other records include most 200 yard receiving games (6), second most 100 yard receiving games (26), and third most career receptions (298).

Insley was signed as an undrafted free agent in 2000 by the Indianapolis Colts. His three-year NFL career with the Colts and the Houston Texans ended in 2002. He was allocated by the Colts to NFL Europe where he starred for the Barcelona Dragons in 2001.

From November 6, 1999, until November 25, 2016, Insley held the record for most all-time career receiving yards in Division I-A competition (now Football Bowl Subdivision). Western Michigan wide receiver Corey Davis broke his record in a game against Toledo.

== Collegiate career ==
=== 1996 ===
Making his college football debut as a true freshman, Insley logged six receptions for over 100 yards against the Oregon Ducks. At the conclusion of the 1996 season, Insley finished his freshman year with 574 yards and 5 touchdowns on 36 receptions, numbers which earned him freshman All-American honors from The Sporting News.

=== 1997 ===
Insley totaled 1,151 yards receiving and six touchdowns with 59 receptions. His most productive game of the year against Boise State saw him put up a 6 catch, 217 yard performance. At the season's end, Insley was chosen for second team all Big West honors.

=== 1998 ===
Insley's junior year performance earned him a first team spot on the all-Big West conference team. He concluded the 1998 season with 69 receptions, 1,220 yards and 11 touchdowns

=== 1999 ===
The 1999 season saw Insley rewrite several school and national records. On November 6, 1999, in a loss against Idaho, Insley broke the all-time receiving yards record with a 254-yard game. Insley accomplished this despite sustaining a concussion during a punt return which took place during the first quarter.

Ultimately, the senior Insley totaled 2,060 yards receiving, a single season Division I-A record that has yet to be surpassed. Insley is the only player in NCAA Division I football history to eclipse 2,000 receiving yards in a single season. He was the second individual in all NCAA divisions to reach this threshold; Scott Pingel posted over 2,100 single season receiving yards at the Division III level of competition in 1998. This earned him All-American honors from the Associated Press and Sporting News. At the conclusion of his collegiate career, Insley held the all time Division I-A records for total yards receiving and total receptions. His 298 catches were only three short of Jerry Rice's NCAA Division I record for most career receptions.

Insley was named as a Fred Biletnikoff Award finalist at the end of the season.

== Professional career ==
Insley received free agent offers from the Indianapolis Colts, Cincinnati Bengals and Detroit Lions after not being selected in the 2000 NFL Draft. Insley ultimately signed with the Colts. On January 26, 2001, Insley was selected by the Colts as one of six players for allocation to NFL Europe. There, Insley joined the Barcelona Dragons. Insley's 654 yards led the Dragons in receiving for the 2001 season.

Back in NFL proper after his time in NFL Europe, Insley earned a spot on the Colts regular season roster. Insley spent much of his second season on the injury report, suffering from knee and head injuries. Insley caught his first and only touchdown from Peyton Manning in a game against the Atlanta Falcons. The Colts terminated Insley's contract on February 27, 2002.

On March 1, 2002, Insley was claimed by the Houston Texans. Insley suffered a broken ankle during Houston's first ever preseason game on August 6, 2002, and underwent surgery the following day. He spent the entire 2002 season on injured reserve and was not given a tender offer at season's end.

In 2003, Insley signed a one-year contract with the Ottawa Renegades of the Canadian Football League.

== Motorcycle racing ==
At the Baja 1000 in 2011, Insley was a member of the victorious Class 21 team.

== Personal life ==
Insley studied physical education at the University of Nevada.

Insley was inducted into the Nevada Athletics Hall of Fame in 2010. Along with former pro basketball player Dean Garrett, Insley was inducted into the San Clemente Sports Hall of Fame in May 2014.

As of August 2021, Insley works as a firefighter in Los Angeles.

== See also ==
- List of NCAA Division I FBS career receiving yards leaders
- List of NCAA major college football yearly receiving leaders
- Nevada Wolf Pack football statistical leaders
