= Chris Tormey =

American football player and coach (born 1955)

Biographical details
- Born: May 1, 1955 (age 71); Omaha, Nebraska, U.S.

Playing career
- 1973–1977: Idaho
- Positions: Defensive end, outside linebacker

Coaching career (HC unless noted)
- 1978–1979: Gonzaga Prep (WA) (assistant)
- 1980–1981: Washington (GA)
- 1982–1983: Idaho (DL)
- 1984–1992: Washington (TE/OLB/secondary)
- 1993–1994: Washington (DC)
- 1995–1999: Idaho
- 2000–2003: Nevada
- 2004–2008: Washington (LB/RC)
- 2009–2010: Hawaii (ST/secondary)
- 2011: Washington State (LB)
- 2012–2013: Wyoming (DC)
- 2014: South Whidbey HS (WA)
- 2015: Montreal Alouettes (LB)
- 2016–2018: BC Lions (LB)
- 2019: Saskatchewan Roughriders (LB)
- 2020: Ottawa Redblacks (LB)

Head coaching record
- Overall: 49–54 (college)
- Bowls: 1–0

Accomplishments and honors

Championships
- 1 Big West (1998)

Awards
- 2× All-Big Sky (1976–1977); Big West Coach of the Year (1998)

Christopher Joseph Tormey (born May 1, 1955) is an American former football coach.

Formerly the head coach at Nevada and Idaho (his alma mater), Tormey was an assistant coach for 16 seasons at Washington (1984–94 & 2004–08); he also spent two seasons there as a graduate assistant (1980–81). He returned to the high school level in 2014 as the head coach at South Whidbey in Langley, Washington. then moved up to CFL as an assistant in 2015.

== Early years ==
Born in Omaha, Nebraska, Tormey grew up in Spokane, Washington, where he played high school football at Gonzaga Prep under longtime head coach Bill Frazier (1908–2000). All-city as a junior in 1971, a mid-season knee injury in 1972 ended his high school career early.

After graduation in 1973, he played college football at the University of Idaho in Moscow, ninety miles (145 km) to the south. Tormey had a standout sophomore season in 1974 for the Vandals under first-year head coach Ed Troxel, but incurred a knee injury in final game of the season which required surgery.

Tormey redshirted in 1975, and returned in 1976 and was named the team's outstanding defensive player. He was all-conference (Big Sky) in 1976 at defensive end and at outside linebacker in 1977; Idaho changed from a five-man defensive line to a 4–3 defense after the 1976 season. Tormey was a member of Phi Gamma Delta fraternity, and completed his bachelor's degree in education in 1978.

== Coaching career ==
=== Assistant coach (1978–1994) ===
Tormey had a brief stop with the Washington Redskins of the NFL in July 1978, then began his coaching career as a high school assistant back at Gonzaga Prep in Spokane, where he also taught geography. In 1980, his collegiate coaching career began as a graduate assistant at Washington in Seattle, a position he left in 1982 to coach the defensive line at his alma mater in Moscow, serving under newly hired Idaho Vandals' head coach Dennis Erickson.

After two years on the Palouse, Tormey returned to the Huskies in Seattle for eleven seasons, 1984–94, coaching tight ends, linebackers, and the secondary for Don James and Jim Lambright. Undefeated UW (12–0) shared the national championship with Miami in 1991. For the 1994 season, Tormey was promoted by Lambright to defensive coordinator.

=== Head coach ===
==== Idaho (1995–1999) ====
Following the 1994 season, John L. Smith left Idaho and Tormey returned to Moscow to succeed him as head coach. His first season in 1995 was the Vandals' last in the Big Sky and Division I-AA; Idaho joined the Big West in Division I-A in 1996. His starting salary in 1995 was $71,868.

In Tormey's five seasons at the helm in Moscow, Idaho went 33–23 (.589), including the Vandals' first-ever bowl appearance in 1998 in the Humanitarian Bowl, a 42–35 victory over 16-point favorite Southern Mississippi. The Vandals earned the bowl berth by winning the Big West title with a dramatic one-point overtime win over rival Boise State, on the road in Bronco Stadium in Boise. (Although this was Idaho's 15th win in the last 17 games in this rivalry, the 1998 win remains their most recent over BSU.) The bowl victory propelled Idaho to an impressive 9–3 record in 1998, their third season back in Division I-A, and Tormey was named coach of the year in the Big West. Before the season, the Sporting News had Idaho ranked last of 112 teams in Division I-A. Tormey interviewed in early January for the open position at Washington in Seattle, which went to Rick Neuheisel. He also interviewed at Oregon State, which hired Dennis Erickson to replace Mike Riley.

The Vandals went 7–4 in 1999, including a 28–17 win over neighboring Washington State, eight miles (13 km) to the west. It was Idaho's first football victory in the Battle of the Palouse in 34 years, breaking the Cougars' 14-game winning streak in the lopsided series. Tormey's salary in 1999 was $155,000.

==== Nevada (2000–2003) ====
Following the 1999 season, Tormey moved south to Reno to coach the Nevada Wolf Pack, which was leaving the Big West to join the WAC. He succeeded Jeff Tisdel, a former All-American quarterback for the Wolf Pack. Tormey was the head coach for four seasons (2000–03) and compiled a 16–31 record (.340). While his win totals improved each season (2, 3, 5, 6), he was released from the fourth and final season of his contract at the end of the 2003 season, the final game marked by a 56–3 blowout loss at #18 Boise State. Most notably, Tormey failed to defeat bitter in-state rival UNLV in the annual Battle for the Fremont Cannon; his teams were also winless against Boise State and Fresno State. The Wolf Pack did defeat the Washington Huskies 28–17 in Seattle that final season (UW finished at 6–6). Nevada's athletic director Chris Ault hired himself to succeed Tormey; his third stint as head coach of the Wolf Pack went for nine years, through 2012, for a total of 28 seasons.

=== Assistant coach (2004–2013) ===
Tormey was quickly rehired at Washington in 2004 as a defensive assistant under head coach Keith Gilbertson, continuing on with the new coach Tyrone Willingham when he also became the recruiting coordinator.

Following the dismissal of Willingham after Washington's winless 2008 season, Tormey joined head coach Greg McMackin at Hawaii as an assistant coach for two seasons. McMackin was a defensive coach at Idaho during Tormey's last two seasons as a player.

Tormey returned to the mainland and the Palouse in 2011 to join the Washington State staff as the linebackers coach under fourth-year head coach Paul Wulff. The coaching staff was relieved of its duties in December and Mike Leach was hired as head coach for 2012.

In late December 2011, Tormey joined the staff of head coach Dave Christensen at Wyoming for 2012 as the defensive coordinator and secondary coach. Christensen played at Washington in the early 1980s when Tormey was a graduate assistant. On October 29, 2013, Christensen fired Tormey after two straight losses in which the Cowboys surrendered more than 50 points a game. Christensen was fired as head coach a month later.

=== High school coach (2014) ===
In May 2014, Tormey returned to western Washington as the head coach at South Whidbey High School in Langley on Whidbey Island. The Falcons compete in Class 1A, with about 500 students in four grades.

=== Canadian Football League (2015–2020) ===
In January 2015, the Montreal Alouettes of the Canadian Football League announced the hiring of Tormey as linebackers coach. He was recruited by fellow Idaho alumnus and coach Don Matthews, former head coach of the Alouettes, who was hired as a consultant in 2014. Tormey replaced Greg Quick, who left to become defensive coordinator at Saskatchewan, and served under head coaches Tom Higgins and Jim Popp.

After a season in Montreal, Tormey moved west to Vancouver with the BC Lions in January 2016, also as linebackers coach, under head coach and general manager Wally Buono. In 2019, he went east to Saskatchewan and Ottawa in 2020.

== Head coaching record ==
Year	Team	Overall	Conference	Standing	Bowl/playoffs	TSN^{#}
Idaho Vandals (Big Sky Conference) (1995)
1995	Idaho	6–5	4–3	T–2nd	L NCAA Division I-AA First Round	17
Idaho Vandals (Big West Conference) (1996–1999)
1996	Idaho	6–5	3–2	T–3rd		
1997	Idaho	5–6	2–3	T–4th		
1998	Idaho	9–3	5–1	1st	W Humanitarian	
1999	Idaho	7–4	4–2	2nd		
Idaho:		32–23	18–11			
Nevada Wolf Pack (Western Athletic Conference) (2000–2003)
2000	Nevada	2–10	1–7	9th		
2001	Nevada	3–8	3–5	T–7th		
2002	Nevada	5–7	4–4	T–4th		
2003	Nevada	6–6	4–4	6th		
Nevada:		16–31	12–20			
Total:		49–54				
National championship Conference title Conference division title or championship game berth
^{#}Rankings from final The Sports Network poll.
