= Boise State–Nevada football rivalry =

College football rivalry between the Boise State Broncos and the Nevada Wolf Pack

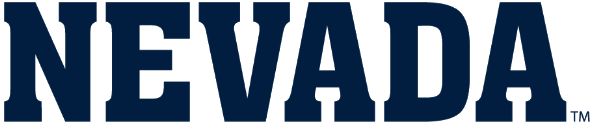
- Boise State Broncos Nevada Wolf Pack
- Sport: Football
- First meeting: September 25, 1971; Boise State, 17–10
- Latest meeting: October 24, 2025; Boise State, 24–3
- Stadiums: Albertsons Stadium; Boise, Idaho, U.S. Mackay Stadium; Reno, Nevada, U.S.
- Trophy: None

Statistics
- Total meetings: 47
- All-time series: Boise State leads, 33–14 (.702)
- Largest victory: Boise State, 56–3 (2003)
- Longest win streak: Boise State, 10 (1999–2009)
- Current win streak: Boise State, 3 (2022–present)

Locations of Boise State and Nevada

The Boise State–Nevada football rivalry is a college football rivalry between the Boise State Broncos football team of Boise State University and Nevada Wolf Pack football team of University of Nevada, Reno. The game was played every year from 1971 to 2025, with the exception of 1978, 1992, 1995, 2000, 2015–2016 and 2019–2020. The teams met twice in 1990 as the second game was a Division I-AA semifinal playoff game; it remains the only post-season game played between the two programs.

The series has often been a conference match-up, with the exception of ten games: 1971–1977, 1993–1994 and 2011. Boise State and Nevada have met as conference rivals in four conferences—Big Sky, Big West, Western Athletic and Mountain West. These have included three NCAA classifications: Division II (originally "college division"), Division I-AA (now FCS) and Division I FBS.

Following the Mountain West's expansion to twelve football members in 2013, the conference was split into two six-team divisions for football, with Boise State placed in the Mountain Division and Nevada in the West Division. The scheduling format adopted at the time included five divisional games and three cross-division games, with no permanent cross-division opponents. In a four-year cycle, teams in opposite divisions played twice (two years in which the game occurred followed by two years in which it did not). As a result, Boise State and Nevada remained frequent opponents but no longer played annually.

Boise State's 2026 move to the Pac-12 Conference has left the future of the rivalry uncertain.

== Notable games ==
- December 8, 1990: Division I-AA semifinal, triple overtime, Nevada advanced to the national title game.
- November 25, 2006: Boise State victory to complete a perfect regular season and earn a BCS bowl bid.
- October 14, 2007: Highest scoring game in the history of the series, 69–67 in four overtime periods. The 136 points is the second most combined points in an FBS game (tied with the Navy vs North Texas on November 10, 2007).
- November 26, 2010: Nevada's overtime victory ended previously undefeated Boise State's BCS hopes.

== Game results ==
Boise State victories	Nevada victories	Tie games

No.	Date	Location	Winner	Score
1	September 25, 1971	Reno, NV	Boise State	17–10
2	October 14, 1972	Boise, ID	#8 Boise State	56–19
3	November 3, 1973	Reno, NV	Nevada	23–21
4	October 5, 1974	Boise, ID	#4 Boise State	36–16
5	November 8, 1975	Reno, NV	#3 Boise State	49–6
6	October 23, 1976	Boise, ID	Boise State	26–8
7	October 15, 1977	Reno, NV	Nevada	28–10
8	November 10, 1979	Reno, NV	Boise State	28–27
9	November 8, 1980	Boise, ID	#7 Boise State	14–3
10	October 31, 1981	Reno, NV	#4 Boise State	13–3
11	September 18, 1982	Boise, ID	Boise State	20–13
12	September 24, 1983	Reno, NV	Nevada	38–20
13	September 22, 1984	Boise, ID	Boise State	37–12
14	September 21, 1985	Reno, NV	Nevada	37–10
15	November 8, 1986	Boise, ID	#1 Nevada	21–16
16	November 7, 1987	Reno, NV	Boise State	36–31
17	October 29, 1988	Boise, ID	Boise State	40–28
18	November 4, 1989	Reno, NV	Nevada	30–14
19	November 10, 1990	Boise, ID	#6 Boise State	30–14
20	December 8, 1990	Reno, NV	#4 Nevada	59–52^{3OT}
21	October 26, 1991	Reno, NV	#1 Nevada	17–14
22	September 11, 1993	Reno, NV	Nevada	38–10
23	September 17, 1994	Boise, ID	Boise State	37–27
24	October 12, 1996	Reno, NV	Nevada	66–28

No.	Date	Location	Winner	Score
25	November 8, 1997	Boise, ID	Nevada	56–42
26	October 31, 1998	Reno, NV	Nevada	52–24
27	October 23, 1999	Boise, ID	Boise State	52–17
28	October 27, 2001	Boise, ID	Boise State	49–7
29	November 23, 2002	Reno, NV	#23 Boise State	44–7
30	November 29, 2003	Boise, ID	#18 Boise State	56–3
31	November 27, 2004	Reno, NV	#10 Boise State	58–21
32	October 29, 2005	Boise, ID	Boise State	49–14
33	November 25, 2006	Reno, NV	#12 Boise State	38–7
34	October 14, 2007	Boise, ID	Boise State	69–67^{4OT}
35	November 22, 2008	Reno, NV	#9 Boise State	41–34
36	November 27, 2009	Boise, ID	#6 Boise State	44–33
37	November 26, 2010	Reno, NV	#19 Nevada	34–31^{OT}
38	October 1, 2011	Boise, ID	#4 Boise State	30–10
39	December 1, 2012	Reno, NV	#25 Boise State	27–21
40	October 19, 2013	Boise, ID	Boise State	34–17
41	October 4, 2014	Reno, NV	Boise State	51–46
42	November 4, 2017	Boise, ID	Boise State	41–14
43	October 13, 2018	Reno, NV	Boise State	31–27
44	October 2, 2021	Boise, ID	Nevada	41–31
45	November 12, 2022	Reno, NV	Boise State	41–3
46	November 9, 2024	Boise, ID	#12 Boise State	28–21
47	October 24, 2025	Reno, NV	Boise State	24–3
Series: Boise State leads 33–14

- Non-conference games (11: 1971–1977, 1990 (playoff), 1993–1994 and 2011)
  - Second meeting in 1990 was Division I-AA semifinal; Nevada won in triple overtime
- Three overtime games: 1990 playoff (3OT), 2007 (4OT) and 2010 (OT)
- Not played in 11 seasons (1978, 1992, 1995, 2000, 2015–2016, 2019–2020, 2023 and 2026–2027)

== Coaching records ==
Since first game on September 25, 1971

=== Boise State ===
Head Coach	Games	Seasons	Wins	Losses	Ties	Pct.
Tony Knap	5	1968–1975	4	1	0	.800
Jim Criner	6	1976–1982	5	1	0	.833
Lyle Setencich	4	1983–1986	1	3	0	.250
Skip Hall	6	1987–1992	3	3	0	.500
Pokey Allen	3	1993–1996	1	2	0	.333
Houston Nutt	1	1997	0	1		.000
Dirk Koetter	2	1998–2000	1	1		.500
Dan Hawkins	5	2001–2005	5	0		1.000
Chris Petersen	8	2006–2013	7	1		.875
Bryan Harsin	3	2014–2020	3	0		1.000
Andy Avalos	2	2021–2023	1	1		.500
Spencer Danielson	2	2023–present	2	0		1.000

=== Nevada ===
Head Coach	Games	Seasons	Wins	Losses	Ties	Pct.
Jerry Scattini	5	1969–1975	1	4	0	.200
Chris Ault (a)	16	1976–1992	7	9	0	.438
Jeff Horton	1	1993	1	0	0	1.000
Chris Ault (b)	1	1994–1995	0	1	0	.000
Jeff Tisdel	4	1996–1999	3	1		.750
Chris Tormey	3	2000–2003	0	3		.000
Chris Ault (c)	9	2004–2012	1	8		.111
Brian Polian	2	2013–2016	0	2		.000
Jay Norvell	3	2017–2021	1	2		.333
Ken Wilson	3	2022–2023	0	1		.000
Jeff Choate	2	2024–present	0	2		.000

- Chris Ault's overall record in series is 8–18–0 (.308)
- There have been no ties in this series; Big Sky went to overtime for conference games in 1980
  & all Division I games went to overtime in 1996.

== See also ==
- List of NCAA college football rivalry games
