= Bryan Reeves =

American football player (born 1970)

No. 80
- Position: Wide receiver

Personal information
- Born: July 10, 1970 (age 56); Carson, California, U.S.
- Listed height: 5 ft 11 in (1.80 m)
- Listed weight: 195 lb (88 kg)

Career information
- High school: Carson
- College: Arizona State; Nevada
- NFL draft: 1994: undrafted

Career history
- Arizona Cardinals (1994–1995); Washington Redskins (1996)*; Anaheim Piranhas (1997); Milwaukee Mustangs (1998); New York CityHawks (1998)
- * Offseason or practice squad member only

Career NFL statistics
- Receptions: 20
- Receiving yards: 264
- Receiving touchdowns: 1
- Stats at Pro Football Reference

Career AFL statistics
- Receptions: 166
- Receiving yards: 2,062
- Touchdowns: 30
- Stats at ArenaFan.com

Bryan K. Reeves (born July 10, 1970) is an American former professional football player who was a wide receiver in the National Football League (NFL) and Arena Football League (AFL). He played in the NFL for the Arizona Cardinals and the AFL for the Anaheim Piranhas, Milwaukee Mustangs and New York CityHawks. He played college football at El Camino College, Arizona State and Nevada.

== See also ==
- List of NCAA major college football yearly receiving leaders
