= Chris Vargas =

American football quarterback

No. 16
- Position: Quarterback

Personal information
- Born: January 29, 1971 (age 55)
- Listed height: 6 ft 0 in (1.83 m)

Career information
- High school: Woodland (CA)
- College: Nevada
- NFL draft: 1994: undrafted

Career history
- Edmonton Eskimos (1994–1995); BC Lions (1996); Winnipeg Blue Bombers (1997–1998)

Awards and highlights
- NCAA passing yards leader (1993)

Career CFL statistics
- Passing TDs–INTs: 34–37
- Passing yards: 5,821

Chris Vargas (born January 29, 1971) is an American former football quarterback. He played in the Canadian Football League (CFL) for the Edmonton Eskimos, BC Lions and Winnipeg Blue Bombers. He played college football for the Nevada Wolf Pack.

== Biography ==
Vargas played for Nevada in the 1990 NCAA Division I-AA Football Championship Game, where the Wolf Pack lost to Georgia Southern, 36–13. He was then the starting quarterback for Nevada during the 1991 through 1993 seasons.

Vargas went undrafted in the 1994 NFL draft, and went on to play in the Canadian Football League (CFL). In 1997, he took over as starting quarterback for Winnipeg. He retired after the 1998 season.

In 2000, Vargas donated part of his lungs to his brother-in-law.

== See also ==
- List of NCAA major college football yearly passing leaders
- List of NCAA major college football yearly total offense leaders
