= Dontay Moch =

American gridiron football player (born 1988)

No. 52, 50, 56
- Position: Linebacker

Personal information
- Born: July 19, 1988 (age 38); Chandler, Arizona, U.S.
- Listed height: 6 ft 2 in (1.88 m)
- Listed weight: 255 lb (116 kg)

Career information
- High school: Hamilton (Chandler)
- College: Nevada
- NFL draft: 2011: 3rd round, 66th overall pick

Career history
- Cincinnati Bengals (2011–2012); Arizona Cardinals (2013); Cincinnati Bengals (2014)*; Tennessee Titans (2014); Toronto Argonauts (2015); Atlanta Falcons (2015)*; Los Angeles KISS (2016); Arizona Rattlers (2017)*
- * Offseason or practice squad member only

Awards and highlights
- WAC Defensive Player of the Year (2009); Second-team All-WAC (2008)

Career NFL statistics
- Total tackles: 7
- Sacks: 1
- Stats at Pro Football Reference

Career AFL statistics
- Total tackles: 7.5
- Sacks: 1.5
- Forced fumbles: 1
- Stats at ArenaFan.com

Dontay Moch (born July 19, 1988) is an American former professional football player who was a linebacker in the National Football League (NFL). He played college football for the Nevada Wolfpack.

== Early life ==
Moch was born in Chandler, Arizona to parents Robert Moch and Rakell Wesley. He has an older brother, Mekell Wesley, who played football at San Diego State. Dontay Moch attended Hamilton High School in Chandler, where he played on the state championship football team in his junior and senior years and ran track. While there, he was named a First-team All-state player.

In track & field, Moch captured the state title in the 200-meter dash event at the 2005 5A State Meet, with a PR time of 21.8 seconds. One year later at the same 5A State Meet, he took gold in the 100-meter dash event, recording a personal-best time of 10.77 seconds, and ran the lead leg on the Hamilton 4 × 100 m relay squad, helping them win the state title with a time of 41.89 seconds.

== College career ==
At the University of Nevada, Moch sat out the 2006 season as a redshirt. In 2007, he saw action in 13 games as a linebacker, defensive end, and on special teams. That season, he recorded 13 tackles, 3.5 sacks, forced one fumble, recovered one fumble, and broke up three passes.

In 2008, Nigel Burton took over as Nevada's defensive coordinator and instituted a 4–3 scheme. The new system relied on the speed of Moch and fellow defensive lineman Kevin Basped to penetrate from the edge. Moch saw action under this scheme in all 13 games and recorded 50 total tackles (33 solo), 17.5 tackles for loss, 11.5 sacks, two broken-up passes, and four forced fumbles. Moch finished the season tied for 12th in the nation in number of quarterback sacks. The Western Athletic Conference (WAC) named him a Second-team All-WAC defensive lineman.

In 2009, Moch was First-team All-WAC honors and was named the WAC Defensive Player of the Year . He started 13 games and finished with 61 tackles, including a WAC-leading 20.0, which set a new Nevada single-season record. He also registered 6.5 sacks, forced two fumbles and broke up three passes. Going into his senior season of 2010 Moch already owns school season records in sacks (11½ in 2008) and tackles for loss (20 in 2009) and needs 7½ sacks and 10 tackles for loss to set WAC career records.

== Professional career ==
Pre-draft measurables
Height	Weight	Arm length	Hand span	Wingspan	40-yard dash	10-yard split	20-yard split	20-yard shuttle	Three-cone drill	Vertical jump	Broad jump	Bench press
6 ft 1 3/8 in (1.86 m)	248 lb (112 kg)	33 in (0.84 m)	9 1/4 in (0.23 m)	6 ft 6 7/8 in (2.00 m)	4.53 s	1.68 s	2.71 s	4.38 s	7.09 s	42.0 in (1.07 m)	10 ft 8 in (3.25 m)	21 reps
All values from NFL Combine

=== Cincinnati Bengals (first stint) ===
Moch was selected in the third round with the 66th overall pick by the Cincinnati Bengals in the 2011 NFL draft.

In 2011, Moch suffered a broken foot in the opening preseason game on August 12, against the Detroit Lions. By October 12, Moch had returned to full practice, but was inactive for the sixth game of the regular season against the Indianapolis Colts on October 17.

Moch was suspended the first 4 games of the 2012 NFL season for using a banned substance. His 2012 campaign ended November 1 when he was placed on injured reserve for recurring migraines.

=== Arizona Cardinals ===
Moch signed with the Arizona Cardinals on September 25, 2013.

=== Cincinnati Bengals (second stint) ===
Moch returned to the Bengals on March 14, 2014, after being claimed off waivers from the Cardinals.

=== Tennessee Titans ===
Moch signed with the Tennessee Titans in 2014.

=== Toronto Argonauts ===
Moch signed with the Toronto Argonauts on May 30, 2015.

=== Atlanta Falcons ===
On December 15, 2015, Moch was signed to the Atlanta Falcons' practice squad.

=== Los Angeles KISS ===
On May 26, 2016, Moch was signed by the Los Angeles KISS.

=== Arizona Rattlers ===
On October 14, 2016, Moch was selected by the Arizona Rattlers during the dispersal draft.
