= David Neill =

American football player (born 1980)

No. 11
- Position: Quarterback

Personal information
- Born: July 17, 1980 (age 46); Santa Clarita, California, U.S.

Career information
- College: Nevada (1998–2001)

David Neill (born July 17, 1980) is an American former college football player. He played as a quarterback for the University of Nevada from 1998 to 2001. In 1998, he set an NCAA record for most touchdown passes in a season by a freshman with 29 thrown. This record was tied in 2006 by Colt McCoy of the Texas Longhorns, and broken the following season by Sam Bradford of Oklahoma. Neill also previously held the school record for most completed passes with 763. This has since been broken by Cody Fajardo (878). He received attention from the Jacksonville Jaguars and New York Jets of the NFL, but he opted for a veterinary career and left football prior to the 2002 NFL draft. But he left the veterinary career and got married and had two kids.

Neill currently holds the following records at the University of Nevada:

1. Total offense in a single game: 582 (also an NCAA record for a true freshman).

2. Total yards thrown in a single game: 611 (also an NCAA record for a true freshman).

3. Career passing yards: 10,901.

4. Passing attempts in a career: 1374.

Neill attended high school at Hart High School in Newhall, California, where he played both football and basketball.
