= DeShone Myles =

American football player (born 1974)

No. 50, 55
- Position: Linebacker

Personal information
- Born: October 31, 1974 (age 52); Las Vegas, Nevada, U.S.
- Listed height: 6 ft 2 in (1.88 m)
- Listed weight: 235 lb (107 kg)

Career information
- High school: Cheyenne (North Las Vegas, Nevada)
- College: Nevada
- NFL draft: 1998: 4th round, 108th overall pick

Career history
- Seattle Seahawks (1998–2000); New Orleans Saints (2001)

Awards and highlights
- 4x All-Big West Selection; 1996 Big West Defensive Player of the Year

Career NFL statistics
- Tackles: 6
- Fumble recoveries: 1
- Stats at Pro Football Reference

DeShone Myles (born October 31, 1974) is an American former professional football player who was a linebacker in the National Football League (NFL) for the Seattle Seahawks and the New Orleans Saints. He was selected in the fourth round of the 1998 NFL draft with the 108th overall pick. Myles played college football for the Nevada Wolf Pack. He is the Wolf Pack's all-time leader in tackles with 528 and also owns four of the top six single season marks for tackles in team history. He was awarded the 1996 Big West Conference Defensive Player of the Year and is a member of Nevada's Team of the Century. Myles failed to reach the same success in the NFL, playing in just 16 games over two seasons before being released due to a knee injury. He is married and has 3 children. He resides in Las Vegas, Nevada where he is a sergeant with the Las Vegas Metropolitan Police Department.
