= Kevin Basped =

American gridiron football player (born 1988)

No. 51, 99
- Position: Linebacker

Personal information
- Born: May 19, 1988 (age 38); Sacramento, California, U.S.
- Listed height: 6 ft 5 in (1.96 m)
- Listed weight: 250 lb (113 kg)

Career information
- High school: Sacramento (CA) Florin
- College: Nevada
- NFL draft: 2010: undrafted

Career history
- New York Jets (2010)*; Omaha Nighthawks (2010–2012); Hamilton Tiger-Cats (2012); Spokane Shock (2014)*
- * Offseason or practice squad member only

Awards and highlights
- First-team All-WAC (2008)

Kevin Basped (born May 19, 1988) is a former American football linebacker. He was signed by the New York Jets as an undrafted free agent in 2010. He played college football at Nevada.

== Early life ==
Basped was born in Sacramento and was raised by father Frances Basped and adoptive mother Kathy Navarro. He attended Florin High School where he played football as a defensive end and tight end. As a senior in 2005, he recorded 18 tackles, 15 receptions for 259 yards, three fumble recoveries, and one blocked punt. He also competed in track & field.

== College career ==
At the University of Nevada, Basped sat out the 2006 season as a redshirt. In 2007, he saw action in 13 games including five starts. He recorded 48 tackles, 4.0 sacks, two forced fumbles, and one fumble recovery. He ranked sixth in the Western Athletic Conference in tackles for loss with 11.5.

In 2008, Nigel Burton took over as Nevada's defensive coordinator and instituted a 4–3 scheme. The new system relied on the speed of Basped and fellow defensive lineman Dontay Moch to penetrate from the edge. That season, Basped saw action in all 13 games, where he recorded 50 tackles (35 solo and 18.5 for loss), 10.0 sacks, three broken-up passes, and three forced fumbles. Basped finished the season tied for 21st in the nation in number of quarterback sacks. The Western Athletic Conference (WAC) named him a first-team All-WAC defensive lineman.

== Professional career ==
=== New York Jets ===
Basped was projected to be taken in the 5th–7th round in the 2010 NFL draft. He went undrafted and signed with the New York Jets on April 27. He was waived on August 8. In the HBO reality show Hard Knocks, the Jets coaches explain to Kevin that his oft-injured knees were too much of a concern to take him on.

=== Spokane Shock ===
Basped was assigned to the Spokane Shock of the Arena Football League on December 20, 2013.
