= Nichiren Flowers =

American football player (born 1983)

Nichiren Flowers (born August 26, 1983) is a former American football wide receiver in the Arena Football League who played for the Los Angeles Avengers, Chicago Rush, San Jose SaberCats, and Spokane Shock. He played college football for the Nevada Wolf Pack.
