= Frank Hawkins =

American football player (born 1959)

No. 27
- Position: Running back

Personal information
- Born: July 3, 1959 (age 67); Las Vegas, Nevada, U.S.
- Listed height: 5 ft 9 in (1.75 m)
- Listed weight: 210 lb (95 kg)

Career information
- High school: Western (Las Vegas)
- College: Nevada (1977–1980)
- NFL draft: 1981: 10th round, 276th overall pick

Career history
- Oakland / Los Angeles Raiders (1981–1987)

Awards and highlights
- Super Bowl champion (XVIII); 3× First-team I-AA All-American (1978–1980); Nevada Wolf Pack No. 27 retired

Career NFL statistics
- Rushing yards: 1,659
- Rushing average: 3.8
- Rushing touchdowns: 15
- Receptions: 97
- Receiving yards: 691
- Receiving touchdowns: 3
- Stats at Pro Football Reference
- College Football Hall of Fame

Frank Hawkins, Jr. (born July 3, 1959) is an American former professional football player who was a running back for seven seasons with the Oakland / Los Angeles Raiders of the National Football League (NFL) from 1981 to 1987. He played college football for the Nevada Wolf Pack. He is also a former Las Vegas City Council member.

== Football career ==
Hawkins' football career began in Las Vegas' Pop Warner system and continued through Western High School, where he was a star running back. After graduation in 1977, he earned a full athletic scholarship to the University of Nevada, Reno, where he played for four seasons and was a three-time All-American (Division I-AA) at running back, and twice the I-AA rushing leader. His jersey #27 was retired by the Wolf Pack.

In the 1981 NFL draft, Hawkins was selected at the end of the tenth round (276th overall) by the Oakland Raiders. With the Raiders in Oakland and Los Angeles, he also wore number 27 and played in Super Bowl XVIII in January 1984. During that 1983 NFL season, Hawkins and running back Kenny King combined for 1,119 total rushing and receiving yards and 10 touchdowns, winning the final game 38-9 over the favored Washington Redskins. During his seven seasons with the Raiders, Hawkins was the second-leading rusher for three straight seasons, 1983-85.

Nicknamed "The Hawk," his 5,333 career rushing yards at Nevada ranks fourth all-time in NCAA history behind Ricky Williams (Texas), Tony Dorsett (Pittsburgh) and Charles White (Southern California). In 1997, Hawkins was inducted into the College Football Hall of Fame.

== Business career ==
Upon his retirement from football, Frank Hawkins served on the Las Vegas City Council and was the first elected black official in the city. He served one four-year term, beginning in 1991. While in office, he was also a board member for the Las Vegas Housing Authority.

Hawkins lost to former police officer Michael McDonald in 1995 after the Nevada Commission on Ethics found that Hawkins breached ethics laws by profiting from a golf tournament whose participants included individuals who did business with the city.

He now builds affordable houses, through federal Housing and Urban Development grants, in low-income, inner city neighborhoods in the same community in which he grew up.

Hawkins is the current president of the NAACP Las Vegas Branch 1111.

Political offices
Preceded by Steve Miller	Las Vegas City Council; Ward 1; 1991–1995	Succeeded by Michael McDonald
