= Chance Kretschmer =

American football player (born 1968)

Profile
- Position: Running back

Career information
- High school: Tonopah (Tonopah, Nevada)
- College: Nevada (2000–2004)

Awards and highlights
- NCAA rushing yards leader (2001)

Chance Kretschmer is an American former college football running back who played for the Nevada Wolf Pack. He led the country in rushing yards in 2001.

== Early life ==
Chance Kretschmer grew up on his family's ranch. He played three sports at Tonopah High School in Tonopah, Nevada. He was a three-time all-state selection in both football and basketball. Kretschmer also helped the school win state titles in football and basketball.

== College career ==
Kretschmer enrolled at the University of Nevada, Reno to play college football for the Wolf Pack. He redshirted the 2000 season as a walk-on. He became a starter as a redshirt freshman in 2001 due to injuries. Kretschmer finished the season with 302 carries for 1,732 yards and 15 touchdowns. He led the entire country in rushing yards and led the Western Athletic Conference in both carries and rushing touchdowns. He missed most of the 2002 season due to a knee injury. Kretschmer played for the Wolf Pack through the 2004 season, finishing his career with 750 rushes for 3,782 yards and 35 touchdowns while also catching 37 passes for 247 yards. He was inducted into the school's athletics hall of fame in 2014.

== Personal life ==
Kretschmer competes in team roping.

== See also ==
- List of NCAA major college football yearly rushing leaders
- Nevada Wolf Pack football statistical leaders
