= Alex Van Dyke =

American football player (born 1974)

No. 86
- Position: Wide receiver

Personal information
- Born: July 24, 1974 (age 52); Sacramento, California, U.S.
- Listed height: 6 ft 0 in (1.83 m)
- Listed weight: 205 lb (93 kg)

Career information
- High school: Burbank (Sacramento)
- College: Nevada
- NFL draft: 1996: 2nd round, 31st overall pick

Career history
- New York Jets (1996–1998); Pittsburgh Steelers (1999)*; Philadelphia Eagles (1999–2000); Oakland Raiders (2001–2002)*
- * Offseason or practice squad member only

Awards and highlights
- 2× Second-team All-American (1994, 1995)

Career NFL statistics
- Receptions: 26
- Receiving yards: 219
- Receiving touchdowns: 3
- Stats at Pro Football Reference

Franklin Alexander Van Dyke (born July 24, 1974) is an American former professional football player who was a wide receiver in the National Football League (NFL). He played college football for the Nevada Wolf Pack, twice earning second-team All-American honors. Van Dyke was selected by the New York Jets in the second round (31st overall) of the 1996 NFL draft. He played five years in the NFL for the Jets and Philadelphia Eagles from 1996 to 2000. He currently owns and operates a training facility in Sacramento, California.

== College career ==
Van Dyke was a two-time All-American, winning the Big West Conference Offensive Player of the Year in 1995 by leading the nation in receiving yards per game (168.6) and receptions per game (11.7).

- 1994: 98 catches for 1,246 yards and 10 TD.
- 1995: 129 catches for 1,854 yards and 16 TD.

== See also ==
- List of NCAA major college football yearly receiving leaders

== See also ==
- List of NCAA Football records
