= Charvez Foger =

American football player (born 1965)

No. 32
- Position: Running back

Personal information
- Born: September 18, 1965 (age 61); Clark County, Nevada, U.S.
- Listed height: 5 ft 10 in (1.78 m)
- Listed weight: 211 lb (96 kg)

Career information
- High school: Bishop Gorman (Las Vegas, Nevada}
- College: Nevada
- NFL draft: 1989: 8th round, 196th overall pick

Career history
- Dallas Cowboys (1989)*; Pittsburgh Steelers (1989)*
- * Offseason or practice squad member only

Awards and highlights
- 4× All-Big Sky (1985–1988); Big Sky Newcomer of the year (1985)

Charvez Lashawn Foger (born September 18, 1965) is an American former professional football running back. He played college football at the University of Nevada, Reno.

== Early life ==
Foger attended Bishop Gorman High School in Las Vegas, where he practiced football and track. He was a starter at running back and once scored five touchdowns in a game. He received All-state honors as a senior.

He accepted a football scholarship from the University of Nevada, Reno. As a freshman, he was named the starter at fullback and made an immediate impact. His best game came against Weber State University with 231 yards from scrimmage, 185 rushing yards, 10.9 yards average per carry with a career-long 77-yard run. He was the first freshman in Division I-AA history to rush for 1,000 yards (1,241) in a season and score 18 touchdowns. He was named the Big Sky Conference Newcomer of the Year. He averaged 6.9 yards per carry and set a school-record with 108 scored points.

As a sophomore, he recorded his only sub-1,000-yard rushing season, after being limited by an ankle injury. He tallied 178 carries for 827 yards (4.7-yard avg.), 14 rushing touchdowns, 15 receptions for 174 yards and one receiving touchdown.

As a junior, he posted 209 carries for 1,132 yards (5.4-yard avg.), 12 rushing touchdowns, 22 receptions for 247 yards and 2 receiving touchdowns. He caught a career-long 63-yard reception against Idaho State University.

As a senior, he registered 298 carries for 1,284 yards (4.3-yard avg.), 12 rushing touchdowns, 25 receptions for 228 yards and one receiving touchdown. Entering the final game of the season against Idaho State University, he needed 198 rushing yards to become the Big Sky Conference's All-time leading rusher. He gained a career-high 206 yards to give him 4,484 yards, which was also the third best mark in Division I-AA history. He became the first player to be a four-time All-Big Sky selection.

In his college career, he gained over 100 yards in 25 of his 42 games. His 60 career touchdowns also exceeded the Division I record of 59 set by Tony Dorsett and Glenn Davis. He averaged a rushing touchdown every 17 times he had a carry. He failed to score a touchdown in only 7 games and had 6 three-touchdown games.

Foger set school and conference career marks in touchdowns (60), scoring by a non-kicker (362 points) and rushing touchdowns (52). He also had 864 carries for 4,484 yards (5.2-yards avg.), 74 receptions for 821 yards and 8 receiving touchdowns.

In 2001, he was inducted into the Nevada Athletics Hall of Fame. In 2013, he was named one of the Big Sky Conference 50 Greatest Male Athletes.

== Professional career ==
Foger was selected by the Dallas Cowboys in the eighth round (196th overall) of the 1989 NFL draft. He was waived in July, after spending less than two weeks in training camp.

On August 4, 1989, he was signed as a free agent by the Pittsburgh Steelers. He was released on August 14.

== Personal life ==
After football, he worked over 24 years on Nevada Senator Harry Reid’s staff. In 2017, he was named Ombudsman for Common Interest Communities in the Real Estate Division of the state of Nevada. In 2021, he was named the Deputy Administrator of the Nevada Real Estate Division.
