= Maurice Mann =

American football player (born 1982)

No. 17, 16, 9, 86
- Position: Wide receiver

Personal information
- Born: September 14, 1982 (age 44); Santa Clara, California, U.S.
- Listed height: 6 ft 2 in (1.88 m)
- Listed weight: 190 lb (86 kg)

Career information
- High school: Monterey (CA)
- College: Nevada
- NFL draft: 2004: 5th round, 149th overall pick

Career history
- Cincinnati Bengals (2004)*; Miami Dolphins (2004–2005); Seattle Seahawks (2005–2006)*; Minnesota Vikings (2006); Cleveland Browns (2007)*; Edmonton Eskimos (2007); Washington Redskins (2008)*; Edmonton Eskimos (2008–2009); Hamilton Tiger-Cats (2010–2011); Toronto Argonauts (2011–2012, 2014)
- * Offseason or practice squad member only

Awards and highlights
- Grey Cup champion (2012)
- Stats at Pro Football Reference
- Stats at CFL.ca (archive)

Maurice Mann (born September 14, 1982) is an American former professional football wide receiver in the Canadian Football League (CFL). He was selected by the Cincinnati Bengals in the fifth round of the 2004 NFL draft. He played college football at Nevada and Monterey Peninsula College.

Mann was also a member of the Cleveland Browns, Miami Dolphins, Seattle Seahawks, Minnesota Vikings, Edmonton Eskimos, Washington Redskins, Hamilton Tiger-Cats, and Toronto Argonauts.

== College career ==
He attended the University of Nevada and played in 20 games in his college career, catching 53 passes for 827 yards and five touchdowns.
