= 2000 TCU Horned Frogs football team =

American college football season

2000 TCU Horned Frogs football

WAC co-champion

Mobile Alabama Bowl, L 21–28 vs. Southern Miss
- Conference: Western Athletic Conference

Ranking
- Coaches: No. 18
- AP: No. 21
- Record: 10–2 (7–1 WAC)
- Head coach: Dennis Franchione (3rd season; regular season); Gary Patterson (interim; bowl game)
- Co-offensive coordinators: Les Koenning (1st season); Mike Schultz (3rd season)
- Offensive scheme: Multiple
- Defensive coordinator: Gary Patterson (3rd season)
- Base defense: 4–2–5
- Home stadium: Amon G. Carter Stadium

2000 Western Athletic Conference football standings
	Conf.			Overall
Team	W		L	W		L
No. 21 TCU +	7	–	1	10	–	2
UTEP +	7	–	1	8	–	4
Fresno State	6	–	2	7	–	5
San Jose State	5	–	3	7	–	5
Tulsa	4	–	4	5	–	7
Rice	2	–	6	3	–	8
Hawaii	2	–	6	3	–	9
SMU	2	–	6	3	–	9
Nevada	1	–	7	2	–	10
+ – Conference co-champions; Rankings from AP Poll

The 2000 TCU Horned Frogs football team represented Texas Christian University (TCU) as a member of the Western Athletic Conference (WAC) during the 2000 NCAA Division I-A football season. In their third and final season under head coach Dennis Franchione, the Horned Frogs compiled an overall record of 10–2 with a mark of 7–1 in conference play, sharing the WAC title with UTEP. TCU was invited to the Mobile Alabama Bowl, where the Horned Frogs lost to Southern Miss. Franchione resigned at the conclusion of the regular season to become the head football coach at the University of Alabama. TCU's defensive coordinator, Gary Patterson, was appointed to succeed Franchione as head coach. He led the Horned Frogs in their bowl game in December 2000 and remained the program's head coach until 2021. The team played home games at Amon G. Carter Stadium, which is located on TCU's campus in Fort Worth, Texas.

== Schedule ==
Date	Time	Opponent	Rank	Site	TV	Result	Attendance	Source
September 9	3:05 p.m.	at Nevada	No. 22	Mackay Stadium; Reno, NV	ESPN Plus	W 41–10	19,797	
September 16	11:00 a.m.	Northwestern*	No. 20	Amon G. Carter Stadium; Fort Worth, TX	FSN	W 41–14	30,976	
September 23	6:00 p.m.	Arkansas State*	No. 18	Amon G. Carter Stadium; Fort Worth, TX		W 52–3	32,167	
September 30	11:00 a.m.	at Navy*	No. 16	Navy–Marine Corps Memorial Stadium; Annapolis, MD	FSN	W 21–0	28,477	
October 7	11:00 a.m.	Hawaii	No. 14	Amon G. Carter Stadium; Fort Worth, TX	FSNSW	W 41–21	31,896	
October 21	6:00 p.m.	at Tulsa	No. 11	Skelly Stadium; Tulsa, OK	ESPN Plus	W 17–3	20,034	
October 28	2:00 p.m.	Rice^{†}	No. 11	Amon G. Carter Stadium; Fort Worth, TX	ESPN Plus	W 37-0	30,762	
November 4	9:05 p.m.	at San Jose State	No. 9	Spartan Stadium; San Jose, CA	ESPN2	L 24–27	15,681	
November 11	2:30 p.m.	Fresno State	No. 18	Amon G. Carter Stadium; Fort Worth, TX	FSN	W 24–7	29,116	
November 18	2:00 p.m.	UTEP	No. 15	Amon G. Carter Stadium; Fort Worth, TX	FSNSW	W 47–14	41,068	
November 24	7:30 p.m.	at SMU	No. 13	Gerald Ford Stadium; University Park, TX (rivalry)	FSN	W 62–7	26,551	
December 20	7:00 p.m.	Southern Miss*	No. 13	Ladd–Peebles Stadium; Mobile, AL (Mobile Alabama Bowl)	ESPN2	L 21–28	40,300	
*Non-conference game; ^{†}Homecoming; Rankings from AP Poll released prior to the game; All times are in Central time

== Rankings ==
Ranking movements Legend: ██ Increase in ranking ██ Decrease in ranking — = Not ranked
	Week																
Poll	Pre	1	2	3	4	5	6	7	8	9	10	11	12	13	14	15	Final
AP	20	20	22	20	18	16	14	12	11	11	9	18	15	13	13	13	21
Coaches	23	21	22	21	19	18	14	11	10	11	9	17	16	15	15	16	18
BCS	Not released									13	9	—	—	14	14	14	Not released

== Roster ==
2000 TCU Horned Frogs football team roster
Players
Coaches
Offense

Pos.	#	Name	Class
QB	1	Casey Printers	So
WR	3	LaTarence Dunbar	So
RB	5	LaDainian Tomlinson	Sr
WR	13	Cedric James	Sr
TE	19	Matt Schobel	Jr
FB	38	George Layne	Jr
OT	52	Michael Keathley	Sr
WR	81	Reggie Harrell	Fr

Defense

Pos.	#	Name	Class
DE	14	Aaron Schobel	Sr
S	18	Curtis Fuller	Jr
DE	21	Bo Schobel	So
CB	30	Bo Springfield	So
DB	39	Jason Goss	So
DE	94	Robert Pollard	Fr
DT	95	Shawn Worthen	Sr

Special teams

Pos.	#	Name	Class

Head coach

- Gary Patterson

Coordinators/assistant coaches

- Keith Allen (RC)

Legend

- (C) Team captain
- (S) Suspended
- (I) Ineligible
- Injured
- Redshirt

Roster
Last update: 2000-12-17

== Awards and honors ==
- LaDainian Tomlinson: Doak Walker Award

== Players drafted into the NFL ==
Player	Position	Round	Pick	NFL club
LaDainian Tomlinson	Running back	1	5	San Diego Chargers
Aaron Schobel	Defensive end	2	46	Buffalo Bills
George Layne	Running back	4	108	Kansas City Chiefs
Curtis Fuller	Defensive back	4	127	Seattle Seahawks
Shawn Worthen	Defensive tackle	4	130	Minnesota Vikings
Cedric James	Wide receiver	4	131	Minnesota Vikings
