= List of TCU Horned Frogs in the NFL draft =

This is a list of TCU Horned Frogs football players in the NFL draft.

== Key ==
B	Back	K	Kicker	NT	Nose tackle
C	Center	LB	Linebacker	FB	Fullback
DB	Defensive back	P	Punter	HB	Halfback
DE	Defensive end	QB	Quarterback	WR	Wide receiver
DT	Defensive tackle	RB	Running back	G	Guard
E	End	T	Offensive tackle	TE	Tight end

== Selections ==
Year	Round	Pick	Overall	Player	Team	Position
1936	1	5	5	Jim Lawrence	Chicago Cardinals	B
1936	5	2	38	Wilson Grosclose	Washington Redskins	T
1936	5	7	43	Darrell Lester	Green Bay Packers	C
1937	1	6	6	Sammy Baugh	Washington Redskins	QB
1937	3	1	21	Drew Ellis	Philadelphia Eagles	T
1937	6	5	55	Walt Roach	Pittsburgh Steelers	E
1937	7	9	69	Marv Baldwin	Green Bay Packers	T
1937	10	10	100	Solon Holt	Cleveland Rams	G
1939	1	1	1	Ki Aldrich	Chicago Cardinals	C
1939	1	4	4	Davey O'Brien	Philadelphia Eagles	QB
1939	1	8	8	I. B. Hale	Washington Redskins	T
1939	9	5	75	Forrest Kline	Brooklyn Dodgers	G
1939	9	9	79	John Hall	Green Bay Packers	B
1939	13	4	114	Allie White	Philadelphia Eagles	T
1940	8	3	63	Don Looney	Philadelphia Eagles	E
1940	10	10	90	Earl Clark	New York Giants	B
1940	12	3	103	Durward Hoerner	Philadelphia Eagles	E
1941	20	8	188	Jack Odle	Chicago Bears	QB
1942	12	1	101	Bill Roach	Pittsburgh Steelers	E
1942	22	4	199	Woody Adams	Green Bay Packers	T
1943	6	9	49	Derrell Palmer	Chicago Bears	T
1943	8	2	62	Bruce Alford Sr.	Philadelphia Eagles	E
1944	3	5	21	Clyde Flowers	New York Giants	T
1944	14	1	132	Van Hall	Chicago Cardinals	B
1944	15	11	153	John Bond	Boston Yanks	B
1945	5	3	35	Zeke Chronister	Chicago Cardinals	E
1945	15	7	149	Merle Gibson	Chicago Bears	E
1946	5	5	35	Pete Stout	New York Giants	B
1947	14	4	119	Weldon Edwards	Washington Redskins	T
1947	22	3	198	Fred Taylor	Pittsburgh Steelers	E
1947	25	2	227	John Polzin	Boston Yanks	G
1947	26	2	237	Dave Bloxom	Boston Yanks	B
1948	31	6	291	Norm Cox	Chicago Bears	B
1949	6	5	56	Doug Brightwell	Pittsburgh Steelers	C
1949	8	5	76	George Brown	Pittsburgh Steelers	G
1949	21	9	210	Leon Joslin	Chicago Cardinals	B
1950	4	9	49	Morris Bailey	San Francisco 49ers	E
1950	7	2	81	Don Narrell	New York Bulldogs	T
1950	7	10	89	Lindy Berry	San Francisco 49ers	B
1950	8	2	94	Jack Archer	New York Bulldogs	B
1950	11	2	133	Roger McAuley	Boston Yanks	G
1950	27	11	350	Hal Kilman	Los Angeles Rams	T
1951	21	3	246	Clarence Marable	Washington Redskins	T
1952	11	9	130	Keith Flowers	Detroit Lions	C
1952	14	6	163	Doug Conway	Washington Redskins	T
1952	15	3	172	Bobby Jack Floyd	Green Bay Packers	B
1952	21	3	244	Herb Zimmerman	Green Bay Packers	G
1952	27	1	314	Gil Bartosh	New York Yanks	B
1953	9	1	98	Bob Blair	Baltimore Colts	E
1953	9	12	109	Carlton McCormick	Detroit Lions	C
1953	14	6	163	Charley Wrenn	Green Bay Packers	T
1953	20	6	235	John Harville	Green Bay Packers	B
1953	21	5	246	Wayne Martin	Chicago Bears	E
1954	6	8	69	Hal Lambert	Philadelphia Eagles	T
1954	13	10	155	Morgan Williams	San Francisco 49ers	G
1954	15	8	177	Ray McKown	Philadelphia Eagles	B
1954	21	8	249	Johnny Crouch	Philadelphia Eagles	E
1955	8	4	89	Johnny Crouch	Green Bay Packers	E
1955	16	3	184	Dick Laswell	Baltimore Colts	T
1955	18	10	215	Claude Roach	Chicago Bears	G
1955	30	8	357	Dave Finney	Philadelphia Eagles	B
1956	2	10	23	Hugh Pitts	Los Angeles Rams	C
1956	6	2	63	Ray Taylor	Pittsburgh Steelers	B
1956	24	2	279	Bryan Engram	Pittsburgh Steelers	E
1957	2	12	25	Jim Swink	Chicago Bears	B
1957	7	12	85	Chuck Curtis	New York Giants	QB
1957	9	2	99	John Mitchell	Los Angeles Rams	C
1957	9	3	100	Ken Wineberg	Green Bay Packers	B
1957	9	10	107	John Nikkel	Detroit Lions	E
1957	12	1	134	Buddy Dike	Philadelphia Eagles	B
1957	28	7	332	Bill Curtis	San Francisco 49ers	B
1957	29	7	344	Vern Hallbeck	San Francisco 49ers	B
1958	1	13	13	Jim Shofner	Cleveland Browns	DB
1958	14	11	168	Ken Miller	Cleveland Browns	T
1958	21	9	250	Jim Faulk	Baltimore Colts	B
1958	25	5	294	John Groom	Washington Redskins	G
1959	12	8	140	Justin Rowland	Chicago Bears	E
1959	14	8	164	Joe Robb	Chicago Bears	T
1959	22	12	264	Lonny Leatherman	Baltimore Colts	E
1960	1	6	6	Jack Spikes	Pittsburgh Steelers	RB
1960	2	11	23	Don Floyd	Baltimore Colts	T
1960	5	10	58	Marv Lasater	Baltimore Colts	B
1960	9	6	102	Marshall Harris	Pittsburgh Steelers	G
1960	10	7	115	Arvie Martin	Pittsburgh Steelers	C
1960	20	8	236	Ray Armstrong	Philadelphia Eagles	G
1961	1	13	13	Bob Lilly	Dallas Cowboys	DT
1961	11	13	153	Billy Gault	Cleveland Browns	B
1962	2	4	18	Sonny Gibbs	Dallas Cowboys	QB
1962	3	11	39	Bobby Plummer	Dallas Cowboys	T
1963	18	4	242	Rudy Mathews	Philadelphia Eagles	T
1964	3	13	41	Tommy Crutcher	Green Bay Packers	B
1964	5	7	63	Ken Henson	Los Angeles Rams	C
1965	9	10	122	Larry Bulaich	Green Bay Packers	B
1967	5	12	119	Bruce Alford Jr.	Chicago Bears	K
1967	11	15	278	Frank Horak	Los Angeles Rams	DB
1968	4	7	90	Mickey McCarty	Kansas City Chiefs	TE
1969	3	14	66	Ross Montgomery	Chicago Bears	RB
1969	6	15	145	Larry Adams	Cleveland Browns	DT
1969	14	1	339	Bubba Thornton	Buffalo Bills	WR
1970	1	18	18	Norm Bulaich	Baltimore Colts	RB
1970	9	2	210	Linzy Cole	Chicago Bears	WR
1970	13	9	321	Jim Vanderslice	San Francisco 49ers	LB
1971	13	4	316	Busty Underwood	Buffalo Bills	QB
1971	14	4	342	Robert Creech	Philadelphia Eagles	LB
1973	2	2	28	Guy Morriss	Philadelphia Eagles	G
1973	9	9	217	Lyle Blackwood	Denver Broncos	DB
1974	8	25	207	Berl Simmons	Minnesota Vikings	K
1974	9	21	229	Charlie Davis	Pittsburgh Steelers	T
1974	14	10	348	Kent Marshall	New Orleans Saints	DB
1974	15	11	375	Sid Bond	Philadelphia Eagles	T
1975	7	5	161	Merle Wang	Cleveland Browns	T
1975	11	10	270	Gene Hernandez	San Francisco 49ers	DB
1976	16	11	442	Ronald Parker	Chicago Bears	TE
1978	4	14	98	Mike Renfro	Houston Oilers	WR
1978	7	13	179	James Wright	Atlanta Falcons	TE
1979	8	6	198	Marshall Harris	New York Jets	DT
1980	7	5	170	Wesley Roberts	Baltimore Colts	DE
1980	11	19	296	Chris Judge	Chicago Bears	DB
1982	12	15	321	Phillip Epps	Green Bay Packers	WR
1983	4	26	110	Greg Townsend	Los Angeles Raiders	DE
1983	6	11	151	Darrell Patterson	New York Giants	LB
1983	9	27	251	Marcus Gilbert	Washington Redskins	RB
1984u	1	13	13	Allanda Smith	Minnesota Vikings	DB
1984	3	8	64	Kyle Clifton	New York Jets	LB
1984	5	2	114	Robert Lyles	Houston Oilers	LB
1984	10	4	256	John Thomas	Philadelphia Eagles	DB
1985	3	14	70	Sean Thomas	Cincinnati Bengals	DB
1985	3	22	78	James Maness	Chicago Bears	WR
1985	8	27	223	Dan Sharp	Miami Dolphins	TE
1986	2	14	41	Kenneth Davis	Green Bay Packers	RB
1986	10	14	263	Gary Spann	Green Bay Packers	LB
1988	2	11	38	Tony Jeffery	Phoenix Cardinals	RB
1988	9	20	241	David Spradlin	Houston Oilers	LB
1988	10	8	257	John Booty	New York Jets	DB
1989	3	16	72	Mitchell Benson	Indianapolis Colts	DT
1989	4	4	88	Stanley Petry	Kansas City Chiefs	DB
1989	10	10	261	Chris Becker	Phoenix Cardinals	P
1989	12	1	308	Scott Ankrom	Dallas Cowboys	WR
1990	2	7	32	Fred Washington	Chicago Bears	DT
1990	5	25	134	Robert McWright	New York Jets	DB
1990	12	2	306	Darrell Davis	New York Jets	LB
1991	8	10	205	Cedric Jackson	Detroit Lions	RB
1991	12	14	320	Larry Brown	Dallas Cowboys	DB
1992	6	15	155	Roosevelt Collins	Miami Dolphins	LB
1995	2	17	49	Barret Robbins	Oakland Raiders	C
1995	2	29	61	Jimmy Oliver	San Diego Chargers	WR
1997	4	16	112	Ryan Tucker	St. Louis Rams	C
1998	6	14	167	Jason Tucker	Cincinnati Bengals	WR
1998	7	23	212	Chance McCarty	Tampa Bay Buccaneers	DE
2001	1	5	5	LaDainian Tomlinson	San Diego Chargers	RB
2001	2	15	46	Aaron Schobel	Buffalo Bills	DE
2001	4	13	108	George Layne	Kansas City Chiefs	RB
2001	4	32	127	Curtis Fuller	Seattle Seahawks	DB
2001	4	35	130	Shawn Worthen	Minnesota Vikings	DT
2001	4	36	131	Cedric James	Minnesota Vikings	WR
2002	3	2	67	Matt Schobel	Cincinnati Bengals	TE
2003	5	23	158	Adrian Madise	Denver Broncos	WR
2003	6	23	196	LaTarence Dunbar	Atlanta Falcons	WR
2004	4	7	103	Bo Schobel	Tennessee Titans	DE
2005	5	26	162	Anthony Alabi	Miami Dolphins	T
2006	4	7	104	Cory Rodgers	Green Bay Packers	WR
2006	5	30	162	Michael Toudouze	Indianapolis Colts	G
2006	6	20	189	Drew Coleman	New York Jets	DB
2007	4	15	114	Marvin White	Cincinnati Bengals	DB
2007	6	22	196	Herbert Taylor	Kansas City Chiefs	T
2009	5	1	137	Jason Phillips	Baltimore Ravens	LB
2009	6	13	186	Robert Henson	Washington Redskins	LB
2009	6	19	192	Aaron Brown	Detroit Lions	RB
2009	6	24	197	Stephen Hodge	Dallas Cowboys	DB
2009	7	16	225	Blake Schlueter	Denver Broncos	C
2010	1	31	31	Jerry Hughes	Indianapolis Colts	DE
2010	2	15	47	Daryl Washington	Arizona Cardinals	LB
2010	5	38	169	Marshall Newhouse	Green Bay Packers	G
2011	2	3	35	Andy Dalton	Cincinnati Bengals	QB
2011	5	7	138	Marcus Cannon	New England Patriots	T
2011	5	22	153	Jeremy Kerley	New York Jets	WR
2011	6	25	190	Colin Jones	San Francisco 49ers	DB
2011	7	16	219	Malcolm Williams	New England Patriots	DB
2012	5	12	147	Tank Carder	Buffalo Bills	LB
2012	7	13	220	Greg McCoy	Chicago Bears	DB
2013	4	5	102	Josh Boyce	New England Patriots	WR
2013	5	20	153	Stansly Maponga	Atlanta Falcons	DE
2014	1	25	25	Jason Verrett	San Diego Chargers	DB
2015	3	35	99	Paul Dawson	Cincinnati Bengals	LB
2015	6	7	183	Tayo Fabuluje	Chicago Bears	G
2016	1	22	22	Josh Doctson	Washington Redskins	WR
2016	4	31	129	Derrick Kindred	Cleveland Browns	DB
2016	5	27	164	Halapoulivaati Vaitai	Philadelphia Eagles	T
2016	6	17	192	Kolby Listenbee	Buffalo Bills	WR
2016	6	40	215	Joey Hunt	Seattle Seahawks	C
2017	7	9	227	Josh Carraway	Tennessee Titans	LB
2018	3	25	89	Joseph Noteboom	Los Angeles Rams	T
2018	6	32	206	Matt Pryor	Philadelphia Eagles	T
2018	7	13	231	Travin Howard	Los Angeles Rams	LB
2019	1	29	29	L. J. Collier	Seattle Seahawks	DE
2019	2	17	49	Ben Banogu	Indianapolis Colts	LB
2019	7	12	226	Ty Summers	Green Bay Packers	LB
2020	1	21	21	Jalen Reagor	Philadelphia Eagles	WR
2020	1	31	31	Jeff Gladney	Minnesota Vikings	DB
2020	2	8	40	Ross Blacklock	Houston Texans	DT
2020	3	32	96	Lucas Niang	Kansas City Chiefs	T
2020	7	22	236	Vernon Scott	Green Bay Packers	DB
2021	2	11	43	Trevon Moehrig	Las Vegas Raiders	DB
2021	5	26	170	Garret Wallow	Houston Texans	LB
2023	1	21	21	Quentin Johnston	Los Angeles Chargers	WR
2023	2	5	36	Steve Avila	Los Angeles Rams	G
2023	3	8	71	Kendre Miller	New Orleans Saints	RB
2023	4	7	109	Dylan Horton	Houston Texans	DE
2023	4	23	125	Derius Davis	Los Angeles Chargers	WR
2023	6	5	182	Tre Tomlinson	Los Angeles Rams	DB
2023	6	39	216	Dee Winters	San Francisco 49ers	LB
2023	7	22	239	Max Duggan	Los Angeles Chargers	QB
2024	3	3	67	Brandon Coleman	Washington Commanders	G
2024	4	31	131	Jared Wiley	Kansas City Chiefs	TE
2024	5	14	149	Josh Newton	Cincinnati Bengals	DB
2025	2	26	58	Jack Bech	Las Vegas Raiders	WR
2025	3	23	87	Savion Williams	Green Bay Packers	WR
2026	2	32	64	Bud Clark	Seattle Seahawks	S
2026	4	26	126	Kaleb Elarms-Orr	Buffalo Bills	LB
2026	6	31	212	Namdi Obiazor	New England Patriots	LB

== Notable undrafted players ==
Note: No drafts held before 1936

Debut Year	Player	Debut Team	Position
1960	Hunter Enis	Dallas Texans	QB
1960	Sherrill Headrick	Dallas Texans	LB
1961	Aubrey Linne	Baltimore Colts	TE
1966	Kent Nix	Green Bay Packers	QB
1974	Donnie Gibbs	New Orleans Saints	DB
1981	Stan Talley	Atlanta Falcons	P
1986	Egypt Allen	Chicago Bears	DB
1987	David Caldwell	Green Bay Packers	DT
1987	Kevin Dean	San Francisco 49ers	LB
1989	Tracy Simien	Pittsburgh Steelers	LB
1992	Kelly Blackwell	Chicago Bears	TE
1993	Brad Smith	Cincinnati Bengals	LB
1994	Greg Evans	Buffalo Bills	DB
1996	Lenoy Jones	Houston Oilers	LB
1996	Richard Woodley	Detroit Lions	DB
1999	Gaylon Hayder	St. Louis Rams	DE
1999	Basil Mitchell	Green Bay Packers	RB
2001	Michael Keathley	San Diego Chargers	G
2007	Jared Retkofsky	Pittsburgh Steelers	LS
2016	Trevone Boykin	Seattle Seahawks	QB
2022	KaVontae Turpin	Dallas Cowboys	WR
2024	Emani Bailey	Kansas City Chiefs	RB
2024	Millard Bradford	New Orleans Saints	S
2024	Andrew Coker	Las Vegas Raiders	T
2024	Willis Patrick	Los Angeles Chargers	G
2024	Mark Perry	Miami Dolphins	S
2025	JaTravis Broughton	Carolina Panthers	CB
2025	Drake Dabney	Tennessee Titans	TE
2025	LaMareon James	Cleveland Browns	CB
2025	Brent Matiscik	Cleveland Browns	LS
2025	Cooper McDonald	Kansas City Chiefs	LB
2025	JP Richardson	Chicago Bears	WR
2026	Channing Canada	New England Patriots	CB
2026	Devean Deal	Seattle Seahawks	LB
