= 2000 Mobile Alabama Bowl =

2000 GMAC Mobile Alabama Bowl
TCU Horned Frogs	Southern Miss Golden Eagles
(10–1)	(7–4)
WAC	C-USA
21	28
Head coach: Gary Patterson	Head coach: Jeff Bower
AP / Coaches / BCS; 13 / 16 / 14
	1	2	3	4	Total
TCU	7	0	14	0	21
Southern Miss	7	0	7	14	28
- Date: December 20, 2000
- Season: 2000
- Stadium: Ladd–Peebles Stadium
- Location: Mobile, Alabama
- MVP: TCU RB LaDainian Tomlinson
- Referee: David Witvoet (Big Ten)
- Attendance: 40,300

United States TV coverage
- Network: ESPN
- Announcers: Mike Tirico (Play by Play); Lee Corso (Analyst); Kirk Herbstreit (Analyst); Dr. Jerry Punch (Sideline)

The 2000 Mobile Alabama Bowl was an American college football bowl game. It was part of the 2000 NCAA Division I-A football season, and was the second edition of the game. With title sponsorship from GMAC (now Ally Financial) it was officially called the GMAC Mobile Alabama Bowl. It was played on December 20, 2000, and featured the Southern Miss Golden Eagles, and the TCU Horned Frogs.

TCU started the scoring with a 3-yard touchdown pass from quarterback Casey Printers to wide receiver George Layne to open up a 7–0 lead. Southern Miss tied it in the 1st quarter when Leo Barnes intercepted a pass, and returned it 50 yards for a touchdown. In the second quarter, Jeff Kelly threw a 9-yard touchdown pass to LeRoy Handy for a 14–7 Southern Miss lead.

TCU running back LaDainian Tomlinson scored on touchdown runs of 7 and 33 yards in the third quarter, as TCU took a 21–14 lead into the fourth quarter. In the fourth quarter, Jeff Kelly threw a 56-yard touchdown pass to LeRoy Handy to tie the game at 21. He threw the game-winning touchdown pass with 8 seconds left, with a 29-yard pass to Kenneth Johnson.
