= Cedric James =

American football player (born 1979)

No. 89
- Position: Wide receiver

Personal information
- Born: March 19, 1979 (age 47); Fort Worth, Texas, U.S.
- Listed height: 6 ft 1 in (1.85 m)
- Listed weight: 199 lb (90 kg)

Career information
- High school: Kennedale (TX)
- College: TCU
- NFL draft: 2001: 4th round, 131st overall pick

Career history
- Minnesota Vikings (2001–2002); New York Jets (2003)*; Dallas Cowboys (2003); New England Patriots (2004–2005)*; → Rhein Fire (2005)
- * Offseason or practice squad member only

Awards and highlights
- Super Bowl champion (XXXIX); All-NFL Europe (2005)

Career NFL statistics
- Games played: 5
- Stats at Pro Football Reference

Cedric James (born March 19, 1979) is an American former professional football player who was a wide receiver in the National Football League (NFL) for the Minnesota Vikings, Dallas Cowboys, and New England Patriots. He played college football for the TCU Horned Frogs.

== Early life ==
James attended Kennedale High School, where he was a two-time All-District 11-3A selection, registering in his senior season 27 receptions for 678 yards (25.11-yards per reception), 11 touchdowns and 10 carries for 155 yards (15.50 yards per attempt). He graduated in 1997.

== College career ==
James accepted a football scholarship from Texas Christian University, where he played in a run oriented offense built around future College Football Hall of Famer LaDainian Tomlinson. As a true freshman, he appeared in 10 games, making 4 receptions for 51 yards. As a sophomore, he recorded 13 receptions (third on the team) for 167 yards (fourth on the team) and was the only wide receiver on the team to catch a touchdown pass.

As a junior, he tallied 4 receptions (tied for sixth on the team) for 52 yards As a senior, he posted 19 receptions (tied for the team lead) for 310 yards (second on the team) and 3 touchdowns. He finished his career with 41 receptions for 593 yards and 4 touchdowns.

== Professional career ==
=== Minnesota Vikings ===
James was selected by the Minnesota Vikings in the fourth round (131st overall) of the 2001 NFL draft. On September 6, he was placed on the injured reserve list with a strained hamstring injury. In 2002, he appeared in 5 games playing mainly on special teams, returning 10 kickoffs for 228 yards and making 2 tackles. He was waived August 13, 2003.

=== Dallas Cowboys ===
On September 1, 2003, he was signed by the Dallas Cowboys to the practice squad. On December 31, he was promoted to the active roster, but was inactive in the wild card playoff game against the Carolina Panthers. He was released on August 31, 2004.

=== New England Patriots ===
On September 22, 2004, he was signed by the New England Patriots to the practice squad.

On February 19, 2005, he was allocated to the Rhein Fire of NFL Europe. He started 8 games, posting 39 receptions (tied for the team lead) for 515 yards (led the team), with a 17.8-yard average and 5 touchdowns. He missed the final 2 games of the season with an injury, but still received NFL Europe All-League honors. Against the Hamburg Sea Devils, he had 6 receptions for 149 yards and a 73-yard touchdown catch.

In 2005, he was injured most of the preseason, which led to his release and signing to the practice squad. He was released on March 2, 2006.

== Personal life ==
James' wife, Myriah, once appeared on the hit game show The Price Is Right.
