= Reggie Harrell =

American football player (born 1981)

Profile
- Position: Wide receiver

Personal information
- Born: November 28, 1981 (age 44); Arlington, Texas, U.S.

Career information
- College: Texas Christian

Career history
- 2005: New York Jets*
- 2005: Dallas Cowboys*
- 2005–2006: Chicago Bears*
- * Offseason or practice squad member only

Reginald Lester Harrell Jr. (born November 28, 1981) is an American former football wide receiver in the National Football League. He was originally signed as an undrafted free agent by the New York Jets out of Texas Christian University. He was waived by the Chicago Bears on August 27, 2006.
