= LaDainian Tomlinson =

American football player (born 1979)

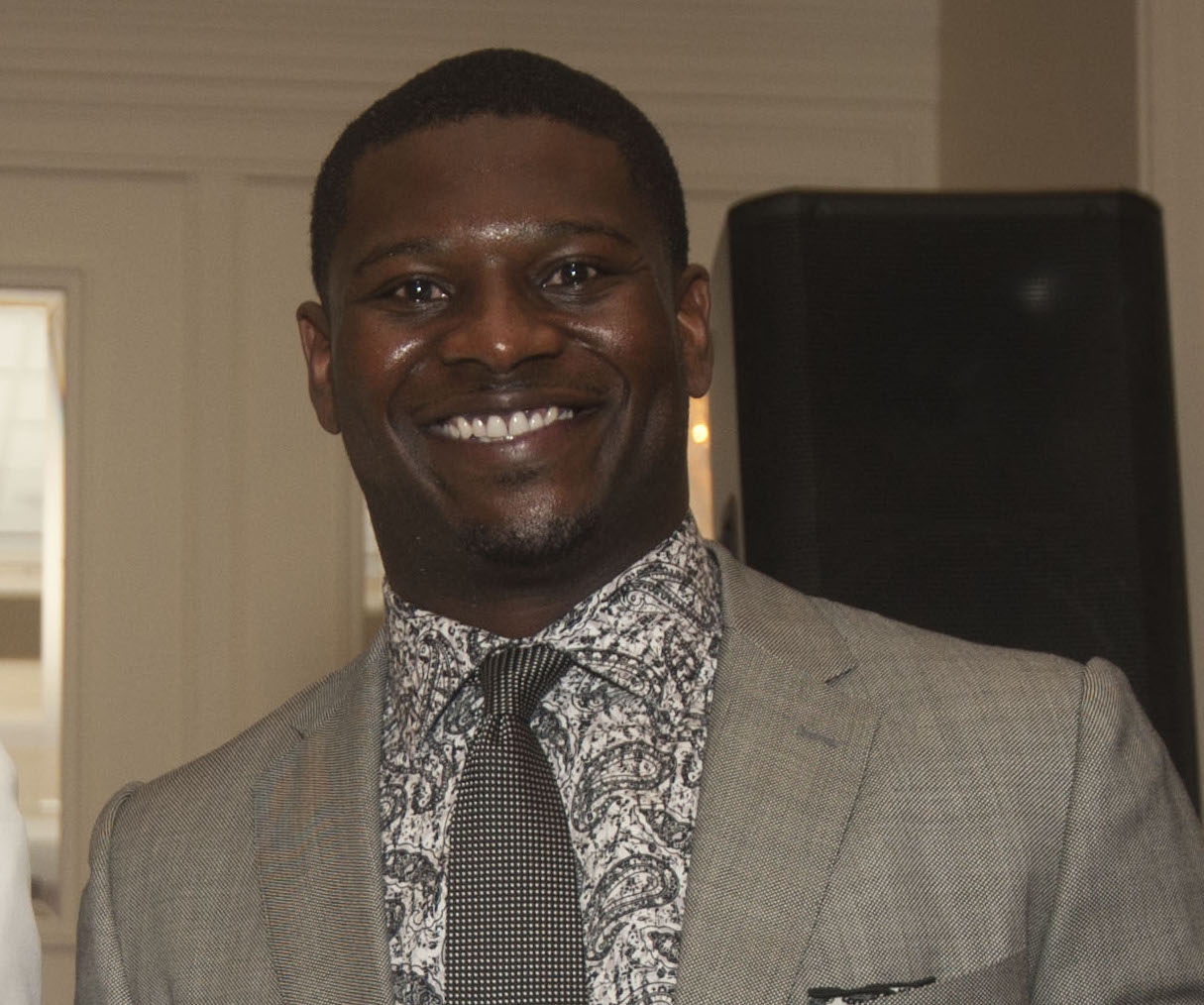
- Tomlinson in 2017

Los Angeles Chargers
- Title: Special assistant

Personal information
- Born: June 23, 1979 (age 47); Rosebud, Texas, U.S.
- Listed height: 5 ft 10 in (1.78 m)
- Listed weight: 215 lb (98 kg)

Career information
- Position: Running back (No. 21)
- High school: University (Waco, Texas)
- College: TCU (1997–2000)
- NFL draft: 2001: 1st round, 5th overall pick

Career history

Playing
- San Diego Chargers (2001–2009); New York Jets (2010–2011)

Operations
- Los Angeles Chargers (2017–present) Special assistant

Awards and highlights
- NFL Most Valuable Player (2006); NFL Offensive Player of the Year (2006); Walter Payton NFL Man of the Year (2006); 3× First-team All-Pro (2004, 2006, 2007); 3× Second-team All-Pro (2002, 2003, 2005); 5× Pro Bowl (2002, 2004–2007); 2× NFL rushing yards leader (2006, 2007); 3× NFL rushing touchdowns leader (2004, 2006, 2007); NFL scoring leader (2006); NFL 2000s All-Decade Team; PFWA NFL All-Rookie Team (2001); Los Angeles Chargers Hall of Fame; Los Angeles Chargers No. 21 retired; Doak Walker Award (2000); Jim Brown Trophy (2000); Unanimous All-American (2000); Second-team All-American (1999); 2× NCAA rushing yards leader (1999, 2000); 2× WAC Offensive Player of the Year (1999, 2000); TCU Horned Frogs No. 5 retired; NFL records: Most rushing touchdowns in a season: 28 (2006); Most touchdowns from scrimmage in a season: 31 (2006); Most consecutive games with a touchdown: 18 (tied) (Note: With Lenny Moore.); Most points scored in a single season: 186 (2006)

Career NFL statistics
- Rushing attempts: 3,174
- Rushing yards: 13,684
- Rushing touchdowns: 145
- Receptions: 624
- Receiving yards: 4,772
- Receiving touchdowns: 17
- Stats at Pro Football Reference
- Pro Football Hall of Fame
- College Football Hall of Fame

LaDainian Tarshane Tomlinson (born June 23, 1979), nicknamed "L.T.", is an American former professional football running back who played in the National Football League (NFL) for 11 seasons. After a successful college football career with the TCU Horned Frogs, the San Diego Chargers selected him as the fifth overall pick in the 2001 NFL draft. He spent nine years with the Chargers, earning five Pro Bowl appearances, three Associated Press first-team All-Pro nominations, and two NFL rushing titles. Tomlinson was also voted the NFL Most Valuable Player (MVP) in 2006 after breaking the record for touchdowns in a single season. He played two further seasons with the New York Jets, before retiring. Considered one of the greatest running backs of all time, he was elected to the Pro Football Hall of Fame in 2017.

A native of Rosebud, Texas, Tomlinson showed athletic promise while attending University High School. He was recruited by Texas Christian University (TCU). As a junior, Tomlinson rushed for 406 yards in a single game, a Division I record at the time. As a senior, he earned unanimous All-American honors, and won the Doak Walker Award as the best college running back. TCU retired his No. 5 in 2005, and he was inducted to the College Football Hall of Fame in 2014.

The Chargers selected Tomlinson No. 5 overall after passing on the opportunity to select highly rated quarterback Michael Vick. A starter in his rookie season, Tomlinson opened his career with the first of seven consecutive seasons with over 1,200 rushing yards, a streak achieved previously only by Eric Dickerson. He became a prolific scorer under Marty Schottenheimer, who coached the Chargers from 2002 to 2006. Tomlinson's output reached a peak in 2006, when he set numerous single-season records, including for most touchdowns scored (31). These feats won him the NFL MVP award, but San Diego suffered an upset defeat in their playoff opener, and Schottenheimer was fired shortly afterwards. Tomlinson became less central to the Charger offense in the following three seasons, and missed time through injury in key games. He was released following the 2009 season, played two seasons with the Jets, and retired.

Tomlinson was named to five Pro Bowls (2002, 2004–2007), was a first-team All-Pro three times (2004, 2006, 2007), and won consecutive rushing titles in 2006 and 2007. At the time of his retirement, he ranked fifth in career rushing yards (13,684), fifth in yards from scrimmage (18,456), second in career rushing touchdowns (145), and third in total touchdowns (162). Tomlinson also threw seven touchdown passes which ranks second behind Walter Payton (eight) for non-quarterbacks in the Super Bowl era. Tomlinson had his No. 21 retired by the Chargers in 2015 and was inducted into the Pro Football Hall of Fame in 2017, his first year of eligibility.

Tomlinson is often known by his initials, L.T.. He works as an analyst on the NFL Network, and also serves as a special assistant to the Chargers' principal owner, Dean Spanos.

== Early life ==
Tomlinson was born on June 23, 1979, in Rosebud, Texas, to Loreane Chappelle and Oliver Tomlinson. His mother worked as a preacher; his father left the family when Tomlinson was seven years old. Tomlinson did not see his father very often afterward. He grew up with a brother and a sister and later, also a half-sister and three half-brothers. At age nine, Tomlinson joined the Pop Warner Little Scholars football program and scored a touchdown the first time he touched the ball.

Tomlinson attended University High School in Waco, Texas, where he ran track and played basketball, baseball, and football. Tomlinson began his football career playing as both a linebacker and a fullback, but blossomed on the offensive side of the ball; he was named to the District 10–4A second-team offense as a running back. Tomlinson amassed 2,554 yards and 39 touchdowns his senior year, earning honors as the District 25-4A Most Valuable Player and the Super Centex Offensive Player of the Year. He was named to the state all-star football team in 1997, which included future San Diego teammates Drew Brees (Austin Westlake) and Quentin Jammer (Angleton).

Tomlinson was an avid Dallas Cowboys and Miami Hurricanes fan during his youth. He idolized Walter Payton and admired Emmitt Smith, Jim Brown, and Barry Sanders. Tomlinson was able to meet Smith while attending a camp run by Dallas Cowboys tight end Jay Novacek.

== College career ==
Tomlinson accepted an athletic scholarship at Texas Christian University in Fort Worth, Texas, then a member of the Western Athletic Conference (WAC). He played for the TCU Horned Frogs from 1997 to 2000. Before Tomlinson's arrival, TCU had appeared in only one bowl game in the previous 12 seasons and two in the previous 31, losing both. They had recently been downgraded to a minor conference (the WAC) after the breakup of the Southwest Conference.

"What have we been playing college football, a hundred-and-something years and nobody has even been able to do what he did today."

— TCU head coach Dennis Franchione reacting to Tomlinson's record-breaking 406-yard performance against UTEP.

During Tomlinson's freshman and sophomore years, he split time with Basil Mitchell and other backs, while the Horned Frog posted records of 1–10 and 6–5. The latter of these seasons finished with TCU's first bowl win in 42 years against the USC Trojans in the Sun Bowl, though Tomlinson only rushed for 34 yards in the game (Mitchell had 185 yards and two touchdowns). Tomlinson was promoted to the starting running back role during his junior season, responding with 1,850 yards and 18 touchdowns as the Horned Frogs improved to 7–4. On November 20, he set an NCAA Division I record for most rushing yards in a game with a 43-carry, 406-yard, 6-touchdown performance against UTEP. (Note: The record stood until 2014, when it was broken in consecutive weeks by Melvin Gordon (408 yards) and Samaje Perine (427 yards).) TCU ended the season with a 28–14 win against East Carolina in the 1999 Mobile Alabama Bowl. His 20 rushing touchdowns were tied for the NCAA lead with Ron Dayne. He finished second in the NCAA in rushing to Dayne with 1,974 rushing yards. He was named the WAC Offensive Player of the Year and first-team All-WAC for the 1999 season.

Tomlinson's senior season was one of great consistency. He went over 100 rushing yards and scored at least one touchdown in every game. He started his senior campaign with 24 carries for 176 rushing yards and three rushing touchdowns in a 41–10 victory over Nevada. In the following game against Northwestern, he had 39 carries for 243 rushing yards and two rushing touchdowns in the 41–14 victory. In the following game, a 52–3 victory over Arkansas State, he had 23 carries for 140 rushing yards and two rushing touchdowns. TCU ended September with a perfect 4–0 mark with a 24–0 victory over Navy where Tomlinson had 33 carries for 121 rushing yards and one rushing touchdown. To start off October, Tomlinson had his best game of the season to that point with 49 carries for 294 rushing yards and four rushing touchdowns in a 41–21 victory over Hawaii. In the next game, against Tulsa, he had 27 carries for 119 rushing yards and one rushing touchdown in the 17–3 victory. In the following game against Rice, he had 41 carries for 200 rushing yards and two rushing touchdowns in the 37–0 victory. The victory over Rice marked a perfect October and a 7–0 start for TCU. The undefeated Horned Frogs reached a No. 9 ranking in the AP Poll, their highest since 1959. TCU dropped their first game of the season in the following game against San Jose State. Tomlinson had 32 carries for 155 rushing yards and two rushing touchdowns in the 27–24 loss to the Spartans. In the next game against Fresno State, he had 42 carries for 231 rushing yards and one rushing touchdown in the 24–7 victory. In the following game against UTEP, Tomlinson rushed 33 times for 305 yards and three touchdowns in the 47–14 victory. TCU closed out their regular season with a 62–7 victory over SMU, where Tomlinson had 26 carries for 174 rushing yard and one rushing touchdown. In the 2000 season, TCU again improved their record, going 10–1 and qualifying for their second consecutive Mobile Alabama Bowl. He led the NCAA for the second time with 2,158 yards and 22 touchdowns, adding 28 carries for 118 yards and two touchdowns in his final game with TCU, a 28–21 defeat in the Mobile Alabama Bowl. He was recognized as a unanimous first-team All-American. He won the Doak Walker Award and the Jim Brown Trophy as the nation's best running back, and was a finalist for the 2000 Heisman Trophy, but came in fourth in the voting. Tomlinson also repeated as WAC Offensive Player of the Year and as an All-WAC first-team selection.

Tomlinson completed his career at TCU with 5,263 rushing yards, ranking sixth in NCAA Division I history at the time. He had one more game before becoming a professional, taking part in the 2001 Senior Bowl on January 21. Tomlinson rushed for 88 yards and a touchdown and caught a pass for a further 28 yards, earning the game's MVP award and helping the South beat the North 21–16.

TCU retired his No. 5 during halftime of a November 2005 game against UNLV. He was their single-game, single-season, and career record holder in both rushing touchdowns and rushing yards, amongst other records. In December of that year, Tomlinson fulfilled a promise to his mother by earning his degree in communications from TCU. He was inducted into the College Football Hall of Fame on December 9, 2014.

== Professional career ==
Pre-draft measurables
Height	Weight	Arm length	Hand span	40-yard dash	10-yard split	20-yard split	20-yard shuttle	Three-cone drill	Vertical jump	Broad jump	Bench press	Wonderlic
5 ft 10 1/4 in (1.78 m)	221 lb (100 kg)	31 in (0.79 m)	9 in (0.23 m)	4.46 s	1.54 s	2.59 s	4.21 s	6.84 s	40.5 in (1.03 m)	10 ft 4 in (3.15 m)	18 reps	13
All values from the NFL Combine

=== 2001 NFL draft ===
After a 1–15 record in 2000, the San Diego Chargers had the first pick in the 2001 NFL draft. Quarterback was a weakness, with 1998 first-round pick Ryan Leaf considered a draft bust as he was cut after three unsuccessful seasons; Charger quarterbacks had combined for a league-high 30 interceptions in 2000. However, running back was also an area of need, with their team total of 1,062 yards the fewest recorded in a 16-game season. They were expected to use the No. 1 pick on quarterback Michael Vick, but preliminary contract negotiations with the player broke down, and general manager John Butler instead accepted a trade offer from the Atlanta Falcons; the Chargers' first-round pick (No. 1 overall) was exchanged for Atlanta's first-round pick (No. 5 overall), as well as their third-round pick in 2001, their second-round pick in 2002, and wide receiver/kick returner Tim Dwight.

San Diego had shown interest in Tomlinson even before the trade with Atlanta. They selected him fifth overall, after the Cleveland Browns (picking third, and potentially interested in a running back) chose Gerard Warren instead. Instead of Vick, San Diego selected Drew Brees in the second round as their future quarterback. Chargers head coach Mike Riley stated that Tomlinson was the player the team had wanted after they'd made the trade. Tomlinson himself expressed relief at being passed on by the Browns. Of joining a one-win team, he said, "At TCU my freshman year, we were 1–10. I know what it takes to rebuild a program."

=== San Diego Chargers ===
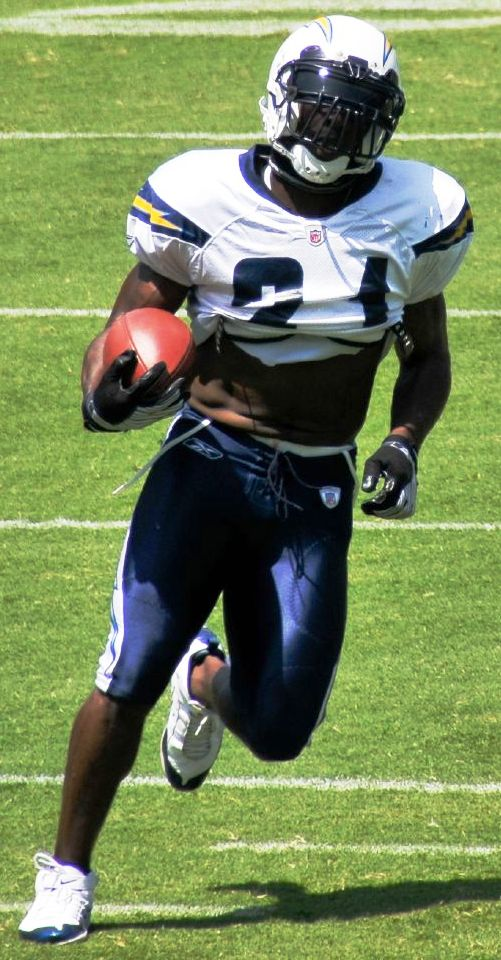
Tomlinson warming up during his tenure with the Chargers

==== 2001 season ====
Tomlinson was a holdout through much of training camp, while his agent Tom Condon negotiated with the Chargers. He eventually signed a six-year, $38 million contract on August 21. He had missed the first two preseason games, and was kept on the bench for the third, before featuring briefly in the final game, rushing five times for 14 yards in a defeat to the Arizona Cardinals.

On September 9, Tomlinson made his regular season debut in a 30–3 victory over the Washington Redskins. He was immediately given a heavy workload, carrying 36 times for 113 yards and two touchdowns in the 30–3 victory. The 36 carries were tied for the third-most in franchise history up to that point, while the 113 yards were a new record for a Charger in his first career game. Tomlinson followed this by rushing for 90, 107, and 102 yards in the following three games. He added four more touchdowns; in a week 3 win against the Cincinnati Bengals, he posted the first three-touchdown game by a Charger running back since Natrone Means in 1994. Four games into his career, Tomlinson was the league leader in both rushing yards with 412 and rushing touchdowns with six, and had already surpassed the 384 yards with which third-down back Terrell Fletcher led the team the previous season.

Tomlinson's pace slowed during the remaining twelve weeks of the season, with only four more touchdowns and one more 100-yard rushing game, which came in week 15 against the Kansas City Chiefs. Nonetheless, his total of 1,236 was the second-most in franchise history, behind only Means in 1994; with a further 367 receiving yards, Tomlinson had 1,603 yards from scrimmage, breaking the franchise record that Lance Alworth had set in 1965. San Diego finished the season with a nine-game losing streak and a 5–11 record. Tomlinson said of breaking Alworth's record, "It means a lot to me and the people who helped me get it. But I just wish I could have gotten it in a winning season when it means more."

League-wide, Tomlinson finished ninth in rushing yards and tied for fourth in rushing touchdowns. However, his yards per carry of 3.6 was only 31st among players with at least 100 carries, and his eight fumbles, one of which was returned for a key touchdown in a loss to the Philadelphia Eagles, were joint-most among non-quarterbacks. Tomlinson led the league in touches (rushing attempts and receptions combined) with 398, and ranked ninth for yards from scrimmage. He received 16 votes for the Associated Press Offensive Rookie of the Year award, finishing second to Anthony Thomas (22 votes). Thomas and Tomlinson were the two running backs named to the Pro Football Writers Association All-Rookie team.

==== 2002 season ====
A day after their final game of 2001, the Chargers fired head coach Mike Riley, replacing him with Marty Schottenheimer, recently dismissed as Washington's head coach. Schottenheimer brought with him a reputation for favoring the running game over the pass. Tomlinson said of his new coach, "I think he knows how to win, and he's been doing it for a number of years. ... I think that is the kind of coach that we need." At his Pro Football Hall of Fame enshrinement speech in 2017, Tomlinson would describe Schottenheimer as the best coach he ever had.

Tomlinson tied or broke numerous franchise records during the season. Tomlinson started the season strong with 21 carries for 114 rushing yards and one rushing touchdown to go along with three receptions for 45 receiving yards in the 34–6 victory over the Cincinnati Bengals. In week 4, he had 27 carries for 217 rushing yards and two rushing touchdowns in a 21–14 victory over the defending Super Bowl champion New England Patriots, tying Gary Anderson for the most yards in a single game by a Charger. For his game against the Patriots, he was named AFC Offensive Player of the Week for the first time in his career. In week 7, he tied Marion Butts's record with 39 carries in a game, rushing for 153 yards and scoring the winning touchdown as San Diego beat the eventual AFC champion Oakland Raiders 27–21 in overtime. With five catches in the same game, he had 44 touches in total, breaking another Means record.

"There is no question that a number of those runs, including that long one in the first half, was the product of his determination and heart that he isn't going on the ground."

— Marty Schottenheimer reacting to Tomlinson's 48-touch, 271-yard performance against Denver.

In week 13, Tomlinson had 37 carries for 220 yards and three touchdowns, as well as 11 catches for 51 yards, helping San Diego beat the Denver Broncos in overtime. He had the longest run of his career to that point one play after Denver had taken a 10–0 lead, going for 76 yards and setting up his first touchdown. Tomlinson's rushing yardage broke the record he had tied in week 4, while his 271 yards from scrimmage broke Wes Chandler's Charger record for a regular season game. (Note: Keith Lincoln had 329 yards in a postseason game, the 1963 AFL Championship Game.) With 48 touches, he broke the franchise record he had set in week 7 and also tied James Wilder's NFL record. Denver had entered the game with the league's top-ranked run defense. For his game against the Broncos, he earned his second AFC Offensive Player of the Week nomination.

San Diego was 8–4 after beating the Broncos, but lost their last four in a row to miss the playoffs. Tomlinson nonetheless passed Means' franchise record for rushing yardage in a season with three games still to play, and finished with 1,683 yards, second-most in the league. His yards per carry improved by almost a full yard, to 4.5, while his 14 rushing touchdowns were another franchise record. As well as his rushing feats, Tomlinson also tied Ronnie Harmon's Charger record for receptions by a running back, with 79. He again led the league in touches with 451, which proved to be a career-high; it was also the third-most in NFL history at the time. Tomlinson became the first Charger to gain 2,000-plus yards from scrimmage, with his total of 2,172 ranking third in the league. He also improved his ball security, fumbling only three times.

Tomlinson was rewarded for his performances with his first Pro Bowl nomination (together with Junior Seau, he was one of only two Chargers so honored), as well as being named an Associated Press (AP) 2nd-team All-Pro.

==== 2003 season ====
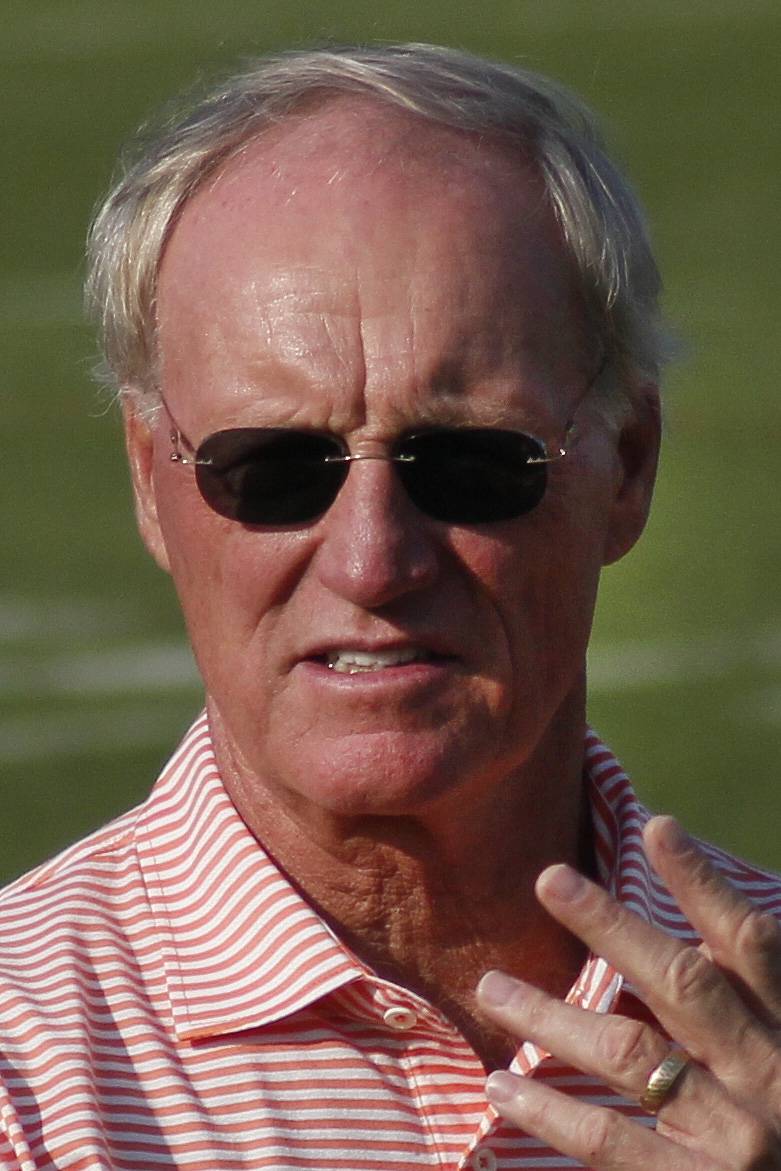
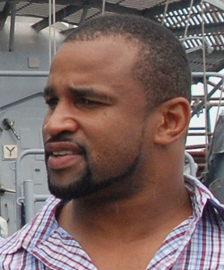
Tomlinson had some of his most productive years under the leadership of head coach Marty Schottenheimer (left) and behind the blocking of fullback Lorenzo Neal (right).

During the 2003 offseason, San Diego signed Lorenzo Neal, a fullback who had blocked for 1,000-yard rushers in each of his previous six seasons, and was coming off his first Pro Bowl nomination. Tomlinson would later describe Neal as vital to the progression of his career, and chose the fullback to introduce him on the day of his induction into the Hall of Fame.

The Chargers struggled throughout the 2003 season, finishing 4–12. Nonetheless, Tomlinson continued to produce strong individual performances. In week 4, he threw the first touchdown pass of his career, a 21-yard throw to Brees, on a trick play, as well as rushing for 187 yards and a touchdown in a loss to the Oakland Raiders. In week 6 against the Cleveland Browns, he rushed 26 times for 200 yards and a touchdown while leading the Chargers to their first win of the year; in total, Tomlinson accounted for 221 of the Chargers' 289 yards in the 26–20 victory. He was named AFC Offensive Player of the week for his game against the Browns. In week 10, against the Minnesota Vikings, he had 16 carries for 162 rushing yards and two rushing touchdowns in the 42–28 victory. The top two receiving performances of his career (measured by yards) arrived back-to-back in weeks 14 and 15; he had nine catches for 148 yards and two touchdowns against the Detroit Lions, and 11 catches for 144 yards and two touchdowns against the Green Bay Packers. Tomlinson entered the regular season finale against the Raiders needing eight more catches to become the first NFL player to have 1,000 rushing yards and 100 receptions in the same season. He achieved this, getting his 100th catch on the Chargers' final offensive play of the game (excluding quarterback kneels). (Note: This feat has since been replicated by other players. Matt Forte was the next, in 2014.) In the same game, he improved upon his franchise record with 243 yards from 31 carries, with two touchdowns. This would remain Tomlinson's career high.

Tomlinson finished with 1,645 rushing yards, third-most in the league. He averaged 5.3 yards per carry, the sixth-highest among backs with 100-plus carries; this would be the best average of his career. His receiving numbers were career highs: 100 receptions, 725 receiving yards, and four receiving touchdowns. The 100 receptions placed him fourth in the league; the rest of the top ten were all wide receivers. He broke Tony Martin's franchise record of 90 receptions in 1995. (Note: Keenan Allen broke Tomlinson's record in 2017.) Tomlinson had 2,370 yards from scrimmage, leading the league; it was the second-highest total in NFL history up to that point. (Note: Marshall Faulk had 2,429 yards in 1999.) He had five games with at least 200 yards from scrimmage during the season, another league record. Tomlinson scored 17 total touchdowns, tied for third in the league and another new career high.

Tomlinson was not voted to the Pro Bowl in 2003, which was seen as a snub by multiple observers; Tomlinson himself expressed disappointment, saying, "I think all those guys deserve to be there, but are they better than me? Nope." However, he was named a Second-team Associated Press All-Pro for the second season in a row, and was runner-up to Jamal Lewis for the AP Offensive Player of the Year Award with eight votes.

==== 2004 season ====
On August 14, Tomlinson signed an eight-year contract worth $60 million, with $21 million guaranteed. It was the richest contract for a running back up to that point.

Tomlinson scored consistently throughout the season, with either one or two touchdowns in fourteen games, including a twelve-game streak from weeks 4 to 16. He again had a big performance against the Oakland Raiders, rushing 37 times for 164 yards and a touchdown during a 23–17 victory in week 10. San Diego clinched the AFC West division in week 15, with a 21–0 win in the snow over the Cleveland Browns; it was their first playoff berth since 1995, ending an eight-year drought. Tomlinson, who rushed for 111 yards and two touchdowns in the game, said, "I've only been here four years, but in some ways it feels like eight. To go from where we were to this is awesome. I've dreamed of the playoffs for a long time, but it's only been a dream."

Tomlinson's yardage numbers were down from the previous season, with 1,335 rushing (7th in the league) and 441 receiving, in part because he was rested in the regular season finale, though his yards per carry dropped significantly to 3.9, and he had barely half as many receptions with 53. However, he led the NFL in rushing touchdowns for the first time with 17. His 1,776 scrimmage yards were tied for fifth in the league, while his 18 total touchdowns ranked second. Tomlinson earned his second Pro Bowl nomination, and rewarded his offensive line with an expenses-paid trip to Hawaii, the site of the game. He was voted Associated Press First-team All-Pro for the first time in his career.

Tomlinson's first playoff experience came in 2004. San Diego hosted the New York Jets in the first round of the playoffs, losing 20–17 in overtime. Tomlinson rushed 26 times for 80 yards, and caught nine passes for 53 yards, scoring no touchdowns. During the sudden-death overtime period, San Diego gained a first down at the New York 22; Tomlinson ran three times for no gain before rookie kicker Nate Kaeding came in for a game-winning field goal attempt. Kaeding missed wide right, and New York drove for the winning points. Schottenheimer was criticized after the game for playing too conservatively with the three Tomlinson runs.

==== 2005 season ====
Tomlinson began the 2005 season on a regular season twelve-game streak of scoring at least one rushing touchdown, one short of the NFL record held by John Riggins and George Rogers. (Note: Tomlinson's failure to score during week 17 of the 2004 season did not end the streak, as he was inactive for the game.) He tied and later broke the record in the first two weeks of the season, though the Chargers lost both games. In week 3, Tomlinson rushed 21 times for 192 yards and three touchdowns and threw a 26-yard touchdown to Keenan McCardell as San Diego defeated the New York Giants 45–23. He was named AFC Offensive Player of the Week for his game against the Giants. After scoring in the next two games, Tomlinson entered week 6 looking to tie Lenny Moore's NFL record of 18 consecutive regular season games with a touchdown of any type. In the game, a 27–14 win against the Oakland Raiders, Tomlinson tied the record and became the tenth player in NFL history to run, catch, and throw for a touchdown in the same game. He earned AFC Offensive Player of the Week for his game against Oakland.

Tomlinson's touchdown streak came to an end the following week, as he was shut down in a 20–17 loss against the Philadelphia Eagles, gaining only seven yards from 17 carries. It would be the only game in his career where Tomlinson had at least ten carries and averaged below a yard per attempt. He credited the Eagles' defense after the game, saying, "They brought the blitz. They got into the backfield. They really controlled the line of scrimmage." Tomlinson threw his third touchdown pass of the season the following week against the Kansas City Chiefs, and had the first four-touchdown game of his career in a 31–26 win over the New York Jets, with three rushing touchdowns and one receiving. He was the first Charger since Chuck Muncie in 1981 to score four in a game. In week 12, Tomlinson rushed 25 times for 184 yards and three touchdowns, including a 41-yard game-winner in overtime as San Diego won 23–17 against the Washington Redskins. For his game against Washington, Tomlinson earned his third AFC Offensive Player of the Week nomination of 2005. After the game, Schottenheimer declared him the finest running back he'd ever seen. However, Tomlinson had no 100-yard rushing games and only a single touchdown over the remaining five games of the season, three of which the Chargers lost as they finished 9–7 and missed the playoffs. He was carrying an injury for much of this period, after picking up a rib injury in week 13 against the Raiders. His ribs were initially described as bruised, but later revealed to have been cracked.

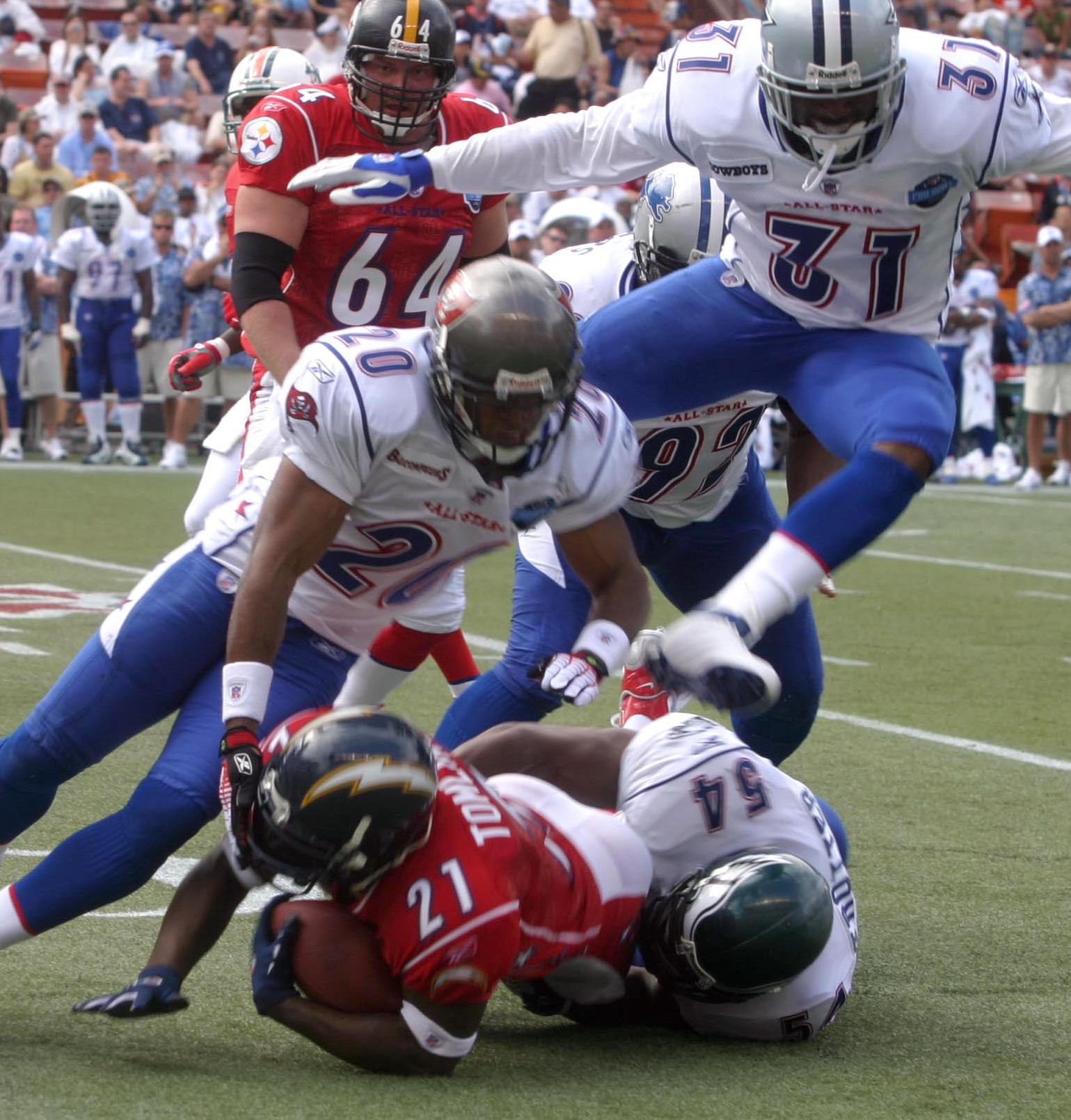
Tomlinson tackled at the 2006 Pro Bowl

Tomlinson's rushing totals were 1,462 yards and 18 touchdowns, ranking sixth and third in the league respectively. With two receiving touchdowns, he had 20 in total; this broke Chuck Muncie's franchise record, set in 1981. He ranked third in the league, behind Seattle Seahawks running back Shaun Alexander, who set a new NFL record with 28. Tomlinson again made the Pro Bowl, and was named an Associated Press second-team All-Pro.

==== 2006 season: NFL MVP ====
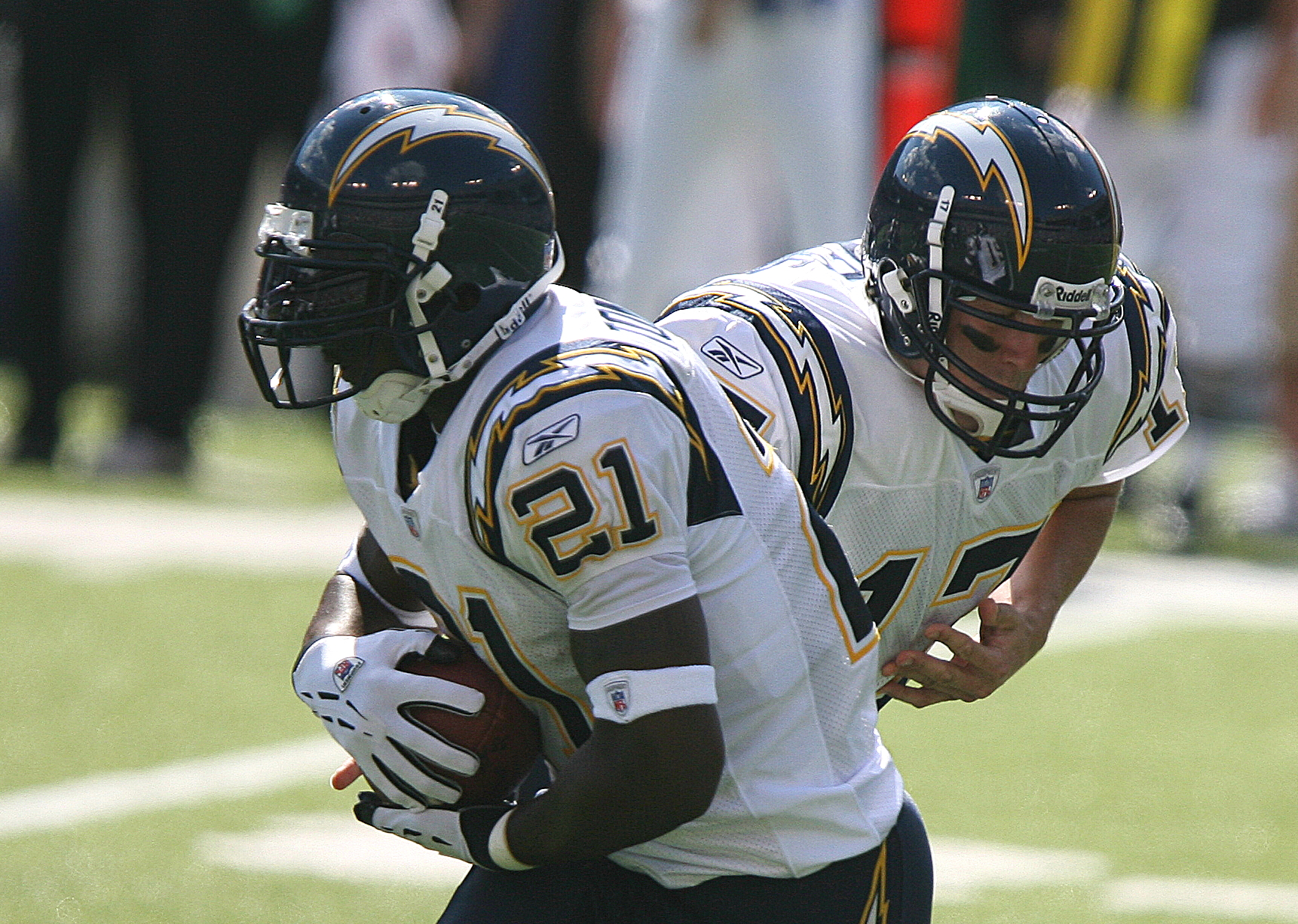
Tomlinson takes a handoff from Philip Rivers in 2006.

San Diego changed starting quarterbacks in 2006. Brees had injured his shoulder in the 2005 finale; after negotiations for a new contract with Chargers general manager A. J. Smith broke down, Brees was allowed to leave in free agency, paving the way for 2004 No. 4 overall draft pick Philip Rivers to take over. Tomlinson spoke positively about Rivers in the leadup to the season, saying, "He's going to be a great quarterback because the intangibles he has are what the great ones have." However, Tomlinson would suggest in a 2016 interview with ESPN that the switch cost San Diego a Super Bowl win, stating that Rivers was too inexperienced at the time.

The Chargers began their regular season with a 27–0 win against the Oakland Raiders, with Tomlinson rushing 31 times for 131 yards and a touchdown. The following week, in a 40–7 victory over the Tennessee Titans, he scored twice to tie Lance Alworth's franchise record of 83 touchdowns. Following a bye week, Tomlinson was kept out the end zone in week 4 (a 16–13 loss against the Baltimore Ravens) and week 5 (a 23–13 win over the defending Super Bowl champion Pittsburgh Steelers, in which he gained a season-low 36 rushing yards). While he only ran for 71 yards on 21 carries the following week against the San Francisco 49ers, Tomlinson had four rushing touchdowns, tying the Charger single-game record of Clarence Williams and Chuck Muncie while moving ahead of Alworth on the career total touchdowns list. In the following game, he caught one touchdown and threw for another as San Diego erased a 14-point, 4th-quarter deficit against the Kansas City Chiefs, though they went on to lose 30–27 to a late field goal.

After the Kansas City game, Tomlinson rushed for at least two touchdowns and at least 100 yards for the next eight games in a row, all Chargers wins. He began the sequence against the St. Louis Rams, rushing for 183 yards and two touchdowns, adding a further 57 receiving yards and a third touchdown, and recovering a late onside kick attempt by the Rams in the 38–24 victory. In the following game against the Cleveland Browns, Tomlinson's first nine carries gained a modest 47 yards, but his following nine went for 125 yards and three touchdowns, giving him 172 yards in total at a season-high 9.56 yards per carry. He again recovered a late onside kick attempt by the opposition in the 32–25 victory. He earned AFC Offensive Player of the Week for his game against the Browns. In week 10, San Diego trailed the Cincinnati Bengals 21–0 after a single quarter, but came back to win 49–41. Tomlinson rushed for four of the Chargers' seven touchdowns, including a pair 15 seconds apart that put them ahead for the first time. In week 11, they faced the Denver Broncos in a division-topping battle of 7–2 teams. Again, they overcame a large deficit, trailing 24–7 in the third quarter before winning 35–27. Tomlinson scored four touchdowns, with three on the ground and one via a 51-yard catch-and-run. Rivers described him after the game as "the best in the business" and "the ultimate weapon". With his second score against Denver, Tomlinson became the fastest player ever to score 100 touchdowns, accomplishing the milestone in 89 games and beating the previous record of 93 games held by Jim Brown and Emmitt Smith. He earned AFC Offensive Player of the Week for his game against the Broncos. Next, he accounted for all the Chargers' points in a 21–14 defeat of the Oakland Raiders, running for two touchdowns and throwing a 19-yard touchdown pass to Antonio Gates. After running for 178 yards and two touchdowns in a 24–21 victory against the Buffalo Bills, he had 26 combined rushing and receiving touchdowns on the season, only two behind the record Alexander had established in 2005.

"When we're old and can't play this game anymore, them are the moments we are going to remember, that we'll be able to tell our kids, tell our grandchildren. We can talk about something special that we did. We made history today."

— Tomlinson, after breaking the NFL record for touchdowns in a single season.

San Diego had a chance to clinch the AFC West by beating the Denver Broncos in week 14. Tomlinson scored once as they built an early 28–3 lead. Denver had a run of 17 unanswered points in the third quarter, but Tomlinson's record-tying 28th touchdown made the game safe at 41–20 in the final minutes. A fumble recovery by Shawne Merriman soon afterward gave San Diego the ball on the Denver seven-yard line. The next play was designed as an inside run, but Tomlinson broke to the left after his lead blocker Neal slipped over. He scored the record-breaking touchdown in the corner of the end zone—his second in 47 seconds—before being mobbed by his teammates and lifted shoulder-high. Tomlinson was named AFC Offensive Player of the Week for his effort against the Broncos. After his retirement, Tomlinson listed the game as his most memorable with the Chargers.

Tomlinson broke three more records the following week, while rushing 25 times for a season-high 199 yards and two touchdowns in a 20–9 victory over the Kansas City Chiefs. His first touchdown took him past Paul Hornung's 46-year-old record of 176 points in a season (Tomlinson finished with 186). His second touchdown was the longest of his career at 85 yards; that was his 28th rushing touchdown of the season, passing Alexander and Priest Holmes, and also gave him multiple touchdowns in eight consecutive games, breaking a tie with Riggins. Tomlinson's streak of rushing touchdowns came to an end the following week, as he was kept out of the end zone in a 20–17 victory against the Seattle Seahawks, though he did extend his streak of 100-yard rushing games to a franchise-record nine. (Note: Natrone Means had the previous record, with five straight 100-yard games.) In the regular season finale against the Arizona Cardinals, Tomlinson left the game with a minor injury in the third quarter after rushing for 66 yards and no touchdowns in the 27–20 victory; that was still enough to give him the NFL rushing title, the first Charger to accomplish the feat. (Note: Paul Lowe and Dickie Post both won AFL rushing titles.)

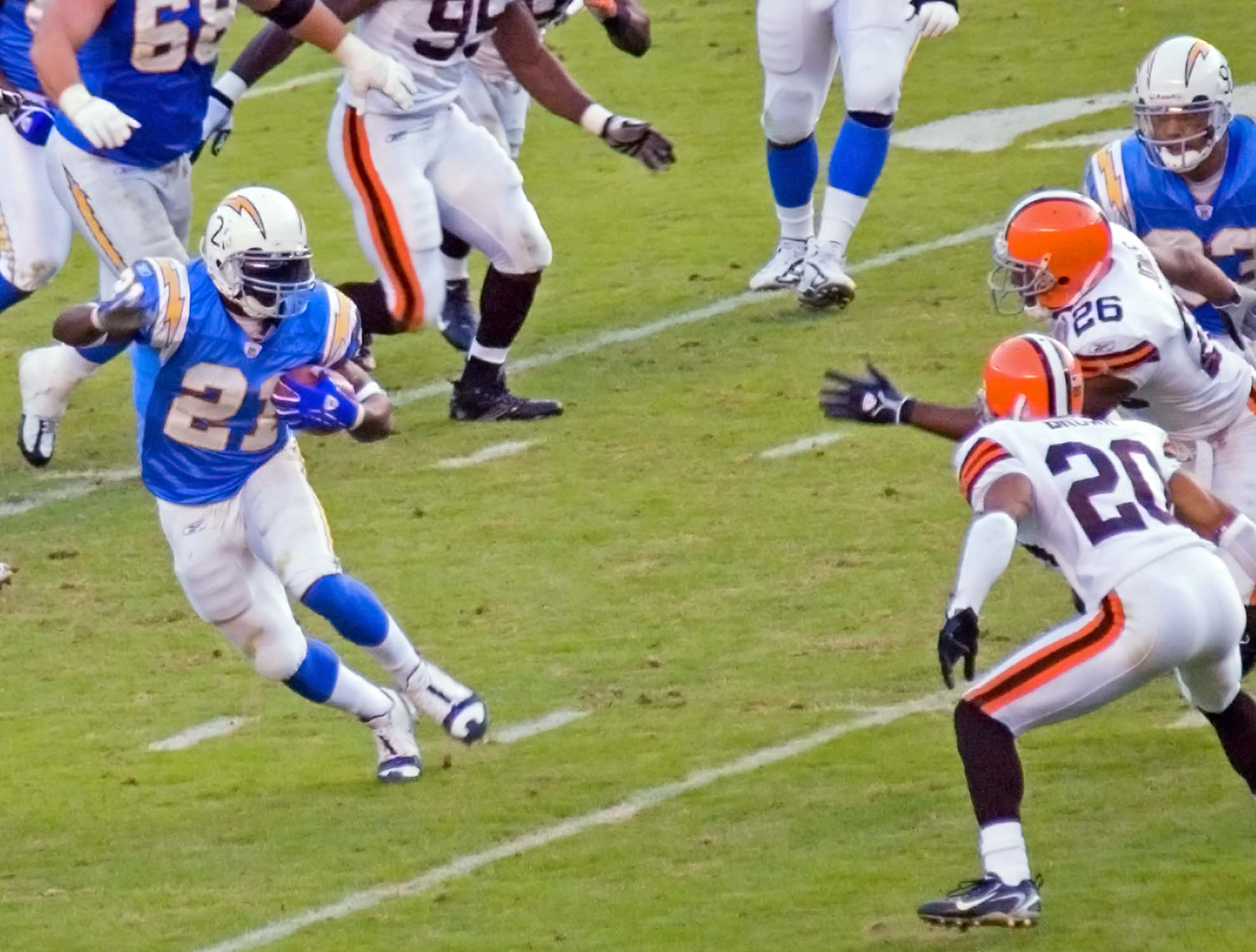
Tomlinson against the Cleveland Browns in 2006. He scored 3 of his NFL single-season record 31 touchdowns in the game.

Tomlinson led the league with 1,815 rushing yards, averaging 5.2 yards per carry and scoring a record 28 rushing touchdowns. He added 56 catches for 508 receiving yards and three receiving touchdowns, with his average of 9.1 yards per catch the highest of his career up to that point. Tomlinson ranked second in the NFL with 2,323 yards from scrimmage; he had 404 touches in total, fumbling only twice. As a team, San Diego finished with a 14–2 record, the best winning percentage in their history, while topping the league with 492 points and claiming the No. 1 seed in the AFC playoffs. Including his two passing touchdowns, Tomlinson was directly involved with 33 of their league-leading 59 touchdowns.

On January 5, 2007, Tomlinson was named the Associated Press NFL Most Valuable Player for his record-breaking season, receiving 44 of the 50 votes from a panel of nationwide sportswriters and broadcasters who cover the NFL. Accepting the award, Tomlinson said that he'd had a great year on a great team, adding, "I would feel so much better about winning if we win the Super Bowl." He was the first Chargers player to win the award. Other organizations to name Tomlinson the NFL MVP included the Pro Football Writers of America, the Sporting News, and the Maxwell Football Club via the Bert Bell Award. The Associated Press also honored him as the Offensive Player of the Year and a unanimous 1st-Team All-Pro. Tomlinson was also named co-winner of the Walter Payton Man of the Year Award alongside Brees, now quarterback of the New Orleans Saints, and was voted to his fourth Pro Bowl. On July 11, 2007, Tomlinson won four ESPY Awards including Male Athlete of the Year.

Tomlinson's second playoff game came at home in the divisional playoffs against the New England Patriots. It was another narrow defeat, this time by a 24–21 scoreline, with Kaeding missing a potential game-tying 54-yard field goal in the final seconds. Tomlinson's good form continued, as he carried 23 times for 123 yards and a pair of touchdowns while catching two passes for 64 yards; he accounted for over half of the Chargers' 352 yards from scrimmage. After the game, the usually mild-mannered Tomlinson shouted at New England players celebrating on the Chargers midfield logo at Qualcomm Stadium by mocking Merriman's sack dance, and suggested Patriots head coach Bill Belichick might be to blame in a post-match interview. "They showed no class at all, and maybe that comes from the head coach," said Tomlinson. Both Tomlinson and Belichick said that they'd put the incident behind them while they were together in Hawaii the following month for the Pro Bowl.

LaDainian Tomlinson's 2006 touchdowns week by week
Week number	1	2	4	5	6	7	8	9	10	11	12	13	14	15	16	17	Divisional playoffs
Rushing	1	2			4		2	3	4	3	2	2	3	2			2
Receiving						1	1			1							
Passing						1					1						

==== 2007 season ====
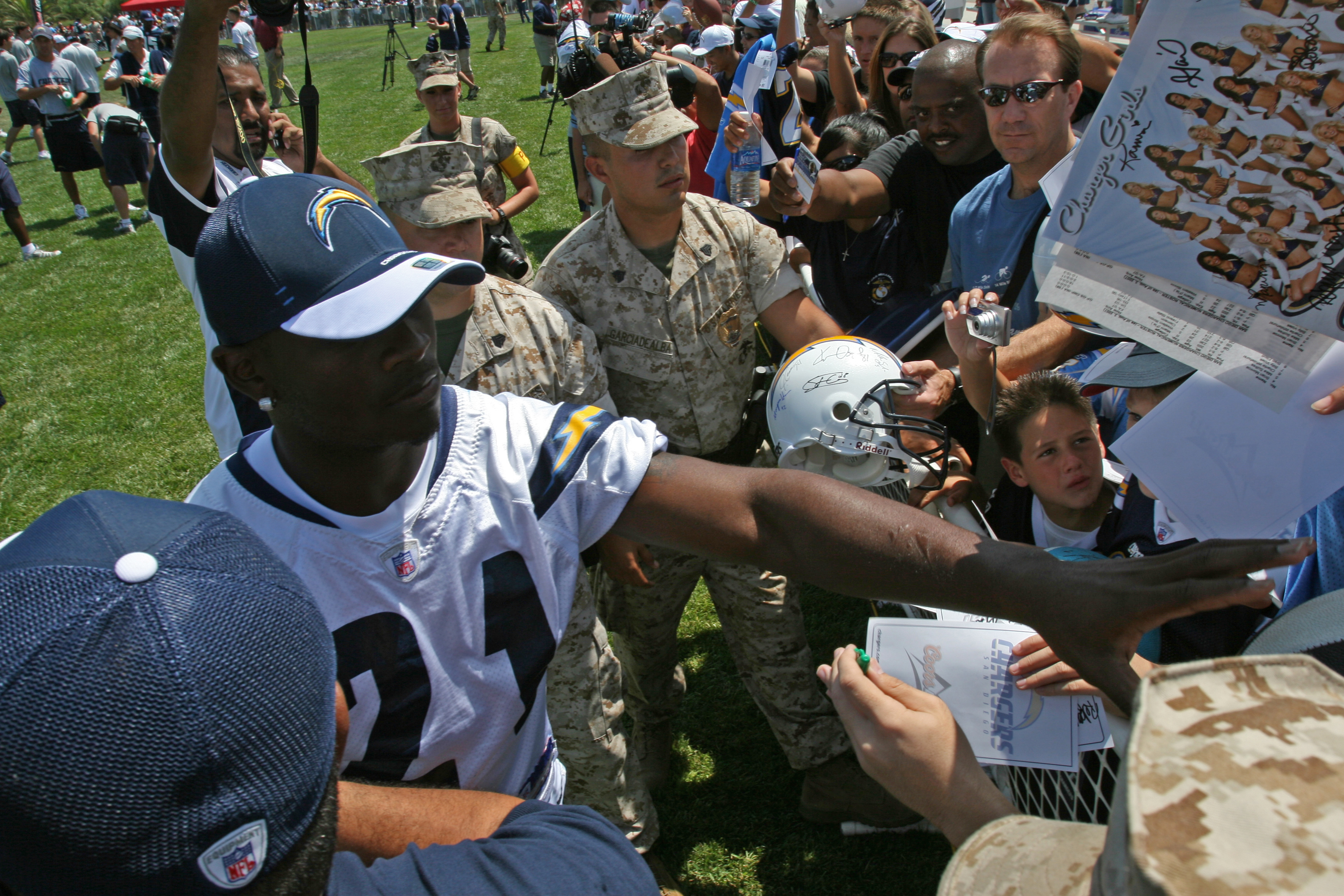
Tomlinson (left) signing autographs for fans on August 11, 2007

Tomlinson and other Chargers defended Schottenheimer after their swift exit from the 2006 playoffs, but Schottenheimer was nonetheless fired by team president Dean Spanos on February 12, 2007. A dysfunctional relationship between Schottenheimer and general manager A. J. Smith was among the reasons given by Spanos. Norv Turner, who was the San Diego Chargers offensive coordinator in Tomlinson's rookie season, replaced Schottenheimer as head coach a week later. "Norv is the perfect fit for our team. He will know exactly what to do with our team," Tomlinson said of the hiring.

Tomlinson struggled for much of the opening game, finishing with 17 carries for only 25 yards. However, he did throw the seventh and final touchdown pass of his career (a 17-yarder to Gates), and scored once himself as San Diego beat the Chicago Bears 14–3. In week 2, they travelled to New England for a rematch of the Divisional Round with the New England Patriots. It was the first game the Patriots played after being sanctioned for the Spygate incident; Tomlinson again criticized the organization, commenting, "I think the Patriots actually live by the saying, 'If you're not cheating, you're not trying.'" New England won the game 38–14, with Tomlinson rushing 18 times for 43 yards. In week 6, he again had a big game against the Oakland Raiders, rushing 24 times for 198 rushing yards and four rushing touchdowns. That would be one of only two 100-yard rushing performances in the first eleven games for Tomlinson, who ranked only sixth in the league for rushing yardage with five games to go.

In a week 12 win against the Kansas City Chiefs, Tomlinson gained 177 yards on 23 carries and scored twice, passing Walter Payton on the all-time career rushing touchdown list with his 111th. A day later, Tomlinson honored Payton by wearing his jersey during a press conference. The following week, San Diego trailed 17–3 against the Tennessee Titans with eight minutes to play, before Tomlinson scored on a seven-yard touchdown catch. After Gates tied the score with nine seconds to play, the game went into overtime. Tomlinson won the game with a 16-yard touchdown run. It was the third overtime touchdown of his career, a record. He rushed 26 times for 146 rushing yards in that game, and added two further 100-yard performances for a streak of four in a row. While he only gained 56 yards in the regular season finale against the Oakland Raiders, Tomlinson's late flurry was enough to win him his second NFL rushing title in a row; the Chargers finished with six straight wins, won the AFC West, and entered the playoffs as the No. 3-seed with an 11–5 record.

Tomlinson was involved in a pair of sideline incidents with Rivers over the course of the season. In an early-season loss to the Green Bay Packers, the two appeared to argue on the sideline; Tomlinson dismissed the interaction as "competitive talk". Later, during the overtime win in Tennessee, Tomlinson got up and walked away immediately after Rivers sat near to him on the bench. Both players downplayed the incident, with Tomlinson explaining that he had left because he had just finished a conversation with Neal.

While Tomlinson's rushing statistics of 1,474 yards and 15 touchdowns were both well short of his 2006 performances, he still led the league in both areas, and became the first player since Edgerrin James in 1999 and 2000 to win back-to-back rushing titles. During that year, Tomlinson became the 23rd player to reach 10,000 rushing yards in NFL history, as well as the fourth fastest, while his career-opening streak of seven consecutive seasons with at least 1,200 rushing yards had previously been achieved only by Eric Dickerson. With 60 receptions for a further 475 yards and 3 touchdowns, Tomlinson ranked second in the NFL for both yards from scrimmage (1,949) and total touchdowns (18). He had zero fumbles for the first time in his career, despite a league-high 375 touches. Tomlinson was nominated for his fifth and final Pro Bowl and, unanimously, his third and final AP 1st-Team All-Pro squad. He was also awarded the Bart Starr Award for his work on and off the field.

Tomlinson had 21 carries for 42 rushing yards and a rushing touchdown and caught three passes for 19 receiving yards in the Chargers' 17–6 Wild Card Round victory over the Tennessee Titans. He scored his touchdown on fourth and goal with San Diego leading 10–6 in the final quarter, leaping over the pile and reaching across the goal line. It was the Chargers' first playoff win since the 1994 AFC Championship Game, and the first of Tomlinson's career. He said of the result, "It didn't come easy, but I tell you, I'm just happy to get that first one." The following week, Tomlinson carried seven times for 28 rushing yards and caught a 20-yard pass, before injuring his knee and leaving the game in the second quarter of the Chargers 28–24 Divisional Round win against the Indianapolis Colts. The injury proved to be a medial collateral ligament (MCL) sprain.

Tomlinson attempted to play through his injury in the following week's AFC Championship, and had two carries for five rushing yards and a one-yard catch but re-injured the knee and sat out the rest of the game. The Chargers lost to the New England Patriots, 21–12. Tomlinson was criticized for sitting on the Chargers' bench with his helmet and a dark visor still over his head, as well as for failing to play through the injury, in contrast to Rivers, who played the whole game. Hall of Fame ex-NFL cornerback Deion Sanders, then working for the NFL Network, said, "Now what's the problem? You're a big-time player, and big-time players must play big-time games." Tomlinson called the comments ridiculous, saying, "He's never been a running back and had a sprained MCL." During the game, the Chargers notified the press box that Tomlinson was set to return, adding to the perception that his injury was not serious. Turner defended Tomlinson, saying, "I know some of it goes back on us in terms of how it was communicated during the game ... If that injury would have happened in week 2, he probably would have missed six weeks."

==== 2008 season ====
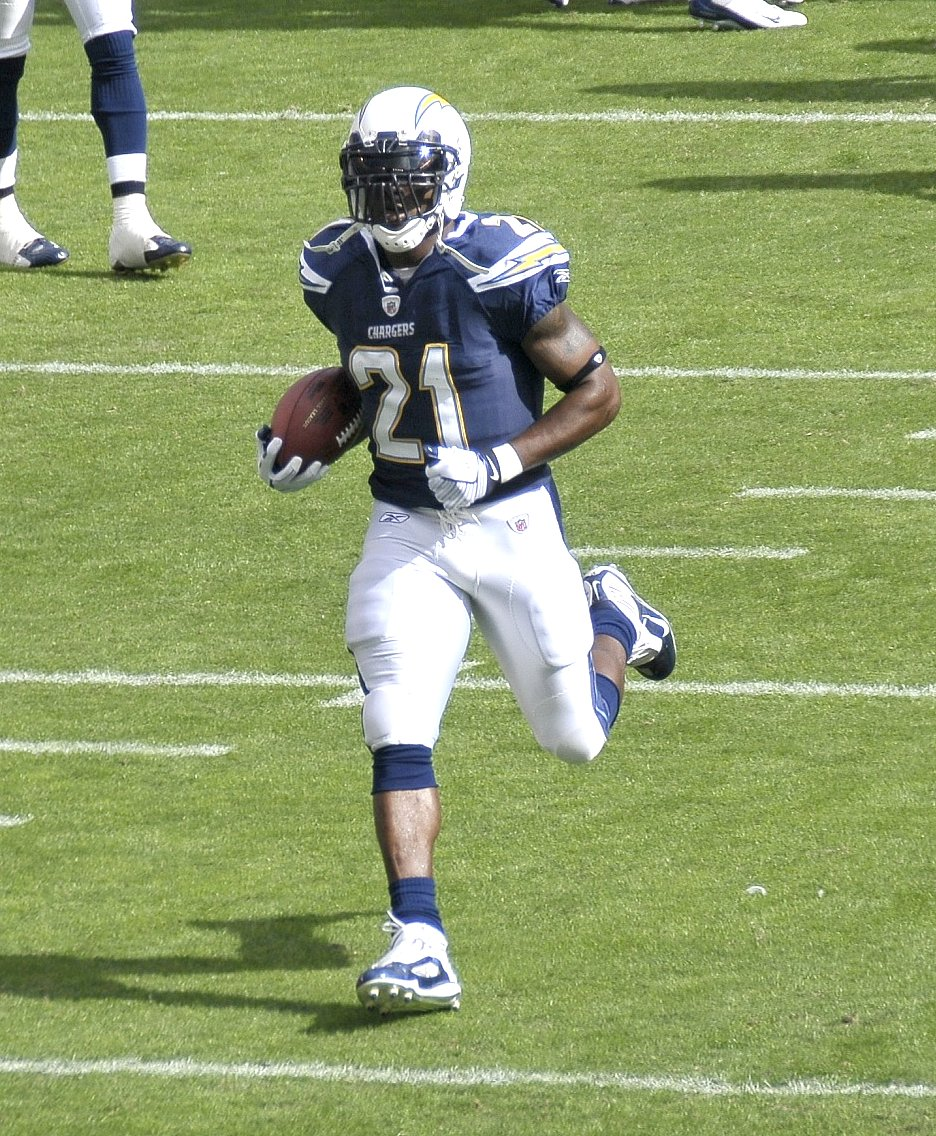
Tomlinson warming up in 2008

Neal, who had missed time in 2007 with a broken fibula, was released by the Chargers during the offseason, leaving rookies Mike Tolbert and Jacob Hester to serve as Tomlinson's lead blockers. Tomlinson himself declared his knee to 100% recovered after offseason rehabilitation, but jammed his big toe during an opening day 26–24 loss to the Carolina Panthers. The new injury persisted throughout the season. In week 4, Tomlinson had 13 carries for 31 yards through the first three quarters, and the Chargers trailed 15–3 in Oakland. He added seven carries for 75 rushing yards and two rushing touchdowns in the fourth quarter, helping San Diego to a 28–18 win. That was one of only two 100-rushing performances by Tomlinson all season. The Chargers also struggled as a team during a 4–8 start, but won three consecutive games to set up a winner-takes-all week 17 game against Denver for the AFC West title. Tomlinson rushed 14 times for 96 rushing yards, and had what would be the final three-touchdown game of his career as San Diego won 52–21. However, he picked up a groin injury while scoring the last touchdown and again entered the playoffs carrying an injury.

Tomlinson ended the regular season with career-lows in attempts (292) and rushing yards (1,110, ranking tenth in the league), while his 11 rushing touchdowns (seventh in the league) and 3.8 yards per carry were both the least since his rookie year. His 344 touches, 1,536 scrimmage yards, and 12 total touchdowns also represented a clear drop from the previous season. The Charger offense became more focused on Rivers, who led the league in touchdowns and passer rating while throwing for over 4,000 yards.

In the Wild Card Round against the Colts, Tomlinson rushed five times for 25 rushing yards and a rushing touchdown before his groin injury forced him out of the game. His replacement Darren Sproles ran for over 100 yards and scored the game-winning touchdown in overtime as San Diego won 23–17. Tomlinson revealed after the game that his injury, previously reported as a strain, was actually a torn tendon; he described it as the toughest injury of his career. The following week, Tomlinson was unable to play at all in the Chargers' Divisional Round game in Pittsburgh, a 35–24 defeat.

==== 2009 season ====
"That's the class that he shows ... I wanted to come down here and show mine ... I'm happy that he did it. It makes it special, because he's a good human being. He's a class individual, and I hope in these later years y'all treat him that way."

— Jim Brown, after witnessing Tomlinson passing him as the eighth leading rusher in NFL history on December 6, 2009.

The offseason began with contract negotiations for Tomlinson, as Smith and Spanos hoped to restructure his existing contract and free up more salary cap space. Relations between Smith and Tomlinson were strained throughout the process. Smith was reported to have been angered when Tomlinson revealed the full extent of his injury before the Divisional Round game against Pittsburgh the prior season. When Tomlinson release a statement expressing his desire to remain in San Diego, Smith appeared to mock him when he responded to an interview question using very similar wording. Smith later apologized to Tomlinson, and the two sides came to an agreement on a restructured version of his three-year contract on March 10. Tomlinson said in another statement, "My heart has always been in San Diego. I couldn't imagine putting on another uniform."

In week 1, Tomlinson rushed 13 times for 55 yards in Oakland, with a touchdown and a lost fumble in the 24–20 victory. It would be the only time all season that he averaged over four yards per carry in a game. He suffered an ankle injury in the Oakland game and missed the next two weeks while recovering. In his first game back, he rushed seven times for 15 yards in a 38–28 loss at Pittsburgh. His most productive rushing performance came in week 10 against Philadelphia, when he ran 24 times for 96 rushing yards and two rushing touchdowns in the 31–23 victory. The touchdowns gave him a total of 146 for his career, passing Marcus Allen for third place in NFL history. In week 13, Tomlinson scored his 150th career touchdown in a 30–23 win at Cleveland; he was the quickest to reach that milestone, doing so in his 137th game. He rushed for 64 yards in the game, enough to lift him past both Marshall Faulk and former Cleveland Brown Jim Brown into eighth place on the career rushing yardage list. Brown was present in the stadium; Tomlinson pointed up to Brown after passing him and tapped his heart to show respect. Brown visited the Charger locker room to give his congratulations after the game.

At the regular season's end, Tomlinson had new career lows in rushing attempts (223), yards (730) and yards per attempt (3.3), as well as receptions (20) and receiving yards (154). Two years after his second rushing title, he ranked only 29th in the league for rushing yards, although his 12 rushing touchdowns were joint-fifth in the league. That gave him nine consecutive 10-touchdown seasons, a record. San Diego's offensive line was impacted by injuries during the season, and the team as a whole averaged a league-worst 3.3 yards per rushing attempt; by contrast, their 8.0 yards per pass play led the league. Despite Tomlinson's limited contributions, San Diego finished the season with 11 straight wins, a 13–3 record, and their fifth AFC West title in six seasons. Tomlinson stated that he had accepted his reduced role in the team.

Tomlinson's last playoff game with the Chargers was similar to his first: a three-point defeat at home against the New York Jets, this time by a 17–14 margin. Tomlinson had little impact on the game, with 12 carries for 24 yards and three receptions for no yards. He was booed by Chargers fans after what would be his final carry for the team, a 1-yard gain in the final quarter. He said of the defeat, "To lose this game, I'm at a loss for words."

==== Departure from San Diego ====
On January 31, Tomlinson was named to the NFL's 2000s All-Decade Team after leading the league with 12,490 rushing yards in the 2000s, 1,797 more than runner-up Edgerrin James. His 138 rushing touchdowns during the decade set an NFL record for any decade, and were 38 more than any other player in the 2000s. However, there was speculation as to whether Tomlinson would play for the Chargers again, with the player himself saying that he expected to be let go.

The Chargers released Tomlinson on February 22, 2010, after nine seasons with the team. Many experts attributed his decline to his age (30) and injuries. In his farewell news conference, Tomlinson said his production declined after the 2006 season when Schottenheimer departed. He felt that the team's focus on running dropped under Turner; in a later interview, he said, "In San Diego, everything was taken away from me. There wasn't an emphasis on running the ball, my best fullback (Neal) was gone, the linemen were pass blocking, we had a passing coach." The San Diego Union-Tribune wrote in response that Tomlinson enjoyed success in his rookie season with Turner as offensive coordinator, as well as in Turner's first season as San Diego's head coach in 2007. The article also cited Turner's history of coaching 1,000-yard rushers, including Emmitt Smith's three NFL rushing titles. A. J. Smith commented, “It’s the team that will win a world championship, not a bunch of individuals.” Tomlinson later clarified that he had not been questioning his offensive line's ability to run block; he expressed a desire to eventually retire as a Charger, but acknowledged a rocky relationship with Smith and stated he felt disrespected by Smith's past comments.

=== New York Jets ===
==== 2010 season ====
"I believe he's got a lot more left. When you watch him out here bouncing around doing a great job with protections, running the football, he's still got that wiggle."

— Rex Ryan on Tomlinson, after watching him in training camp, May 27, 2010.

Tomlinson entered the free-agent market for the first time in his career, expressing excitement at the future and a desire to win a Super Bowl. After the New York Jets and Minnesota Vikings emerged as Tomlinson's most likely destinations, he met with both teams and signed a two-year, $5.2 million contract with the Jets on March 14, 2010. He was expected to back up second-year running back Shonn Greene; the Jets had released five-time 1,000 yard rusher Thomas Jones the previous month when he refused to take a pay cut to serve as Greene's backup. Tomlinson chose to sign with New York because of his familiarity with the system of offensive coordinator Brian Schottenheimer, his enthusiasm for the defense- and run-focussed philosophy of head coach Rex Ryan, and because he felt that the team offered him the best chance to win a championship. He added that he believed he and Green would form a successful partnership.

The Jets lost 10–9 to the Baltimore Ravens on Tomlinson's debut; he rushed 11 times for 62 yards, and was the only Jets running back to have a carry after Greene lost a fumble in the second quarter. In week 4, Tomlinson recorded his first 100-yard rushing game in nearly two years against the Buffalo Bills, running 19 times for 133 yards and two touchdowns in the 38–14 victory. He said of the performance, "I never lost confidence. I always knew I could do it. It was just about having an opportunity." For his game against the Bills, Tomlinson earned AFC Offensive Player of the Week. Tomlinson's first five games of the season were his most productive in terms of rushing yards, as he ranked fifth in the league with 435 yards at 5.7 yards per carry.

While Tomlinson's output reduced over the remainder of the season, he nonetheless improved upon his last year with the Chargers by rushing for 914 yards at 4.2 yards per carry, while catching 52 passes for 368 yards. Tomlinson stayed injury-free, missing only the regular season finale when he was rested with the Jets assured of a wildcard appearance in the playoffs. He did score less frequently than in any of his seasons in San Diego, with only six touchdowns. Brought in to complement Greene, Tomlinson was the Jet's leading rusher, outgaining his backfield partner by 148 yards from 34 more carries. As a team, the Jets ranked fourth in the NFL for rushing yards (though they had been first in 2009) and 11th for total yardage (up from 20th in 2009). He continued to move up the NFL's career rushing yardage leaderboard during the season, passing Tony Dorsett and Eric Dickerson to reach sixth place. He received the Dennis Byrd Award as the Jets' most inspirational player after a vote of his teammates.

The Jets opened their postseason campaign with a 17–16 win at Indianapolis in the AFC Wild Card Round. Tomlinson rushed 16 times for 82 and both Jets touchdowns, and New York won on a 23-yard Nick Folk field goal as time expired. Tomlinson recorded his best rushing output since week 5. Next, the Jets travelled to New England for the Divisional Round. They were heavy underdogs, having lost 45–3 to the Patriots in week 13; Tomlinson spoke of the matchup as an opportunity to redeem himself after having to leave the AFC Championship Game against the same team three seasons earlier. He rushed ten times for 43 yards, and caught a seven-yard touchdown from Mark Sanchez in a 28–21 win. In the AFC Championship Game against the Pittsburgh Steelers, the Jets were down 24–10 in the fourth quarter when Tomlinson was unable to score a touchdown on a fourth-and-goal from the one-yard line. The Jets went on to lose 24–19; Tomlinson finished with nine carries for 16 rushing yards.

==== 2011 season ====
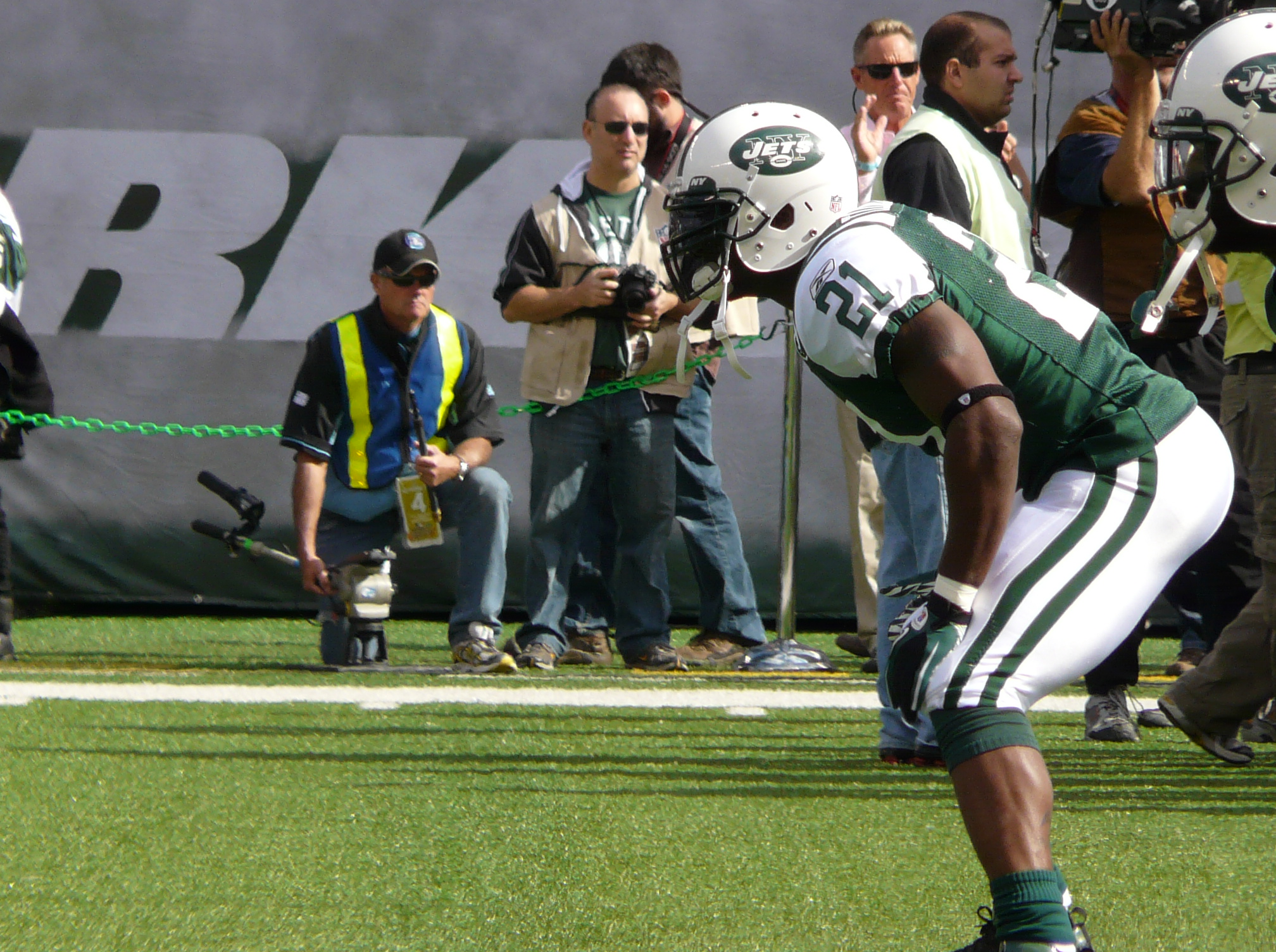
Tomlinson in 2011 with the Jets.

Jets general manager Mike Tannenbaum said after the 2010 season that he expected Tomlinson back for 2011 but "things could change." With Greene designated as the starting running back for 2011, Tomlinson began the season as a third-down back with more emphasis on being a receiver. In the season-opening win over the Dallas Cowboys, he rushed only five times for 16 rushing yards but caught six passes for 73 receiving yards in the 27–24 victory. Tomlinson, who was 32 years old at the start of the season, said that running routes out of the backfield was something he'd always wanted to do as he got older, and that he embraced the change. The opening game set the pattern for the season, as he went on to gain more yardage by receiving than rushing in nine of the fourteen games that he played. In week 3, Tomlinson had the third 100-yard receiving game of his career, catching five passes for 116 receiving yards and a receiving touchdown in a 34–24 loss at Oakland to continue the pattern of success against the Raiders he had established as a Charger. In the game against Oakland, Tomlinson tied his career-high for longest receiving play with a 74-yard reception. In week 7, he faced his former team for the only time in a 27–21 victory for the Jets in New York. Missing part of the game due to illness, he gained 51 yards from scrimmage; of beating the Chargers after they'd released him, he commented, "I'd be lying if I said this didn't add some extra satisfaction."

In week 10 against New England, Tomlinson passed Barry Sanders (18,190 yards) for fifth on the all time yards from scrimmage list, though he picked up a medial collateral ligament (MCL) injury during that game and missed the next two contests against Denver and Buffalo. In his second game back after the injury, Tomlinson scored the 162nd and final touchdown of his career, on a 19-yard catch from Sanchez. In week 14, the Jets defeated the Kansas City Chiefs 37–10 to improve their record to 8–5, but lost their following two games to the Philadelphia Eagles and the New York Giants, and needed to win their regular season finale at Miami to have any chance of making the playoffs. In the game, Tomlinson had his most rushing attempts (11) and yards (56) of the season, adding 4 catches for 23 yards. However, New York lost to Miami by a score of 19–17, ending their season. Tomlinson made a final move up the career rushing yards leaderboard during the game, passing Jerome Bettis (13,662) for fifth place.

Tomlinson finished his final season with 75 carries for 280 rushing yards and a single rushing touchdown, all career lows. Greene, now the main running back, had over 1,000 yards, but the Jets rushing attack was ranked only 22nd in the league, while their offense as a whole was 25th. Tomlinson's new pass-catching role yielded 42 catches for 449 receiving yards and two receiving touchdowns; he averaged 10.7 yards per reception, a career-high. His teammates again voted him the winner of the Dennis Byrd Award.

=== Retirement ===
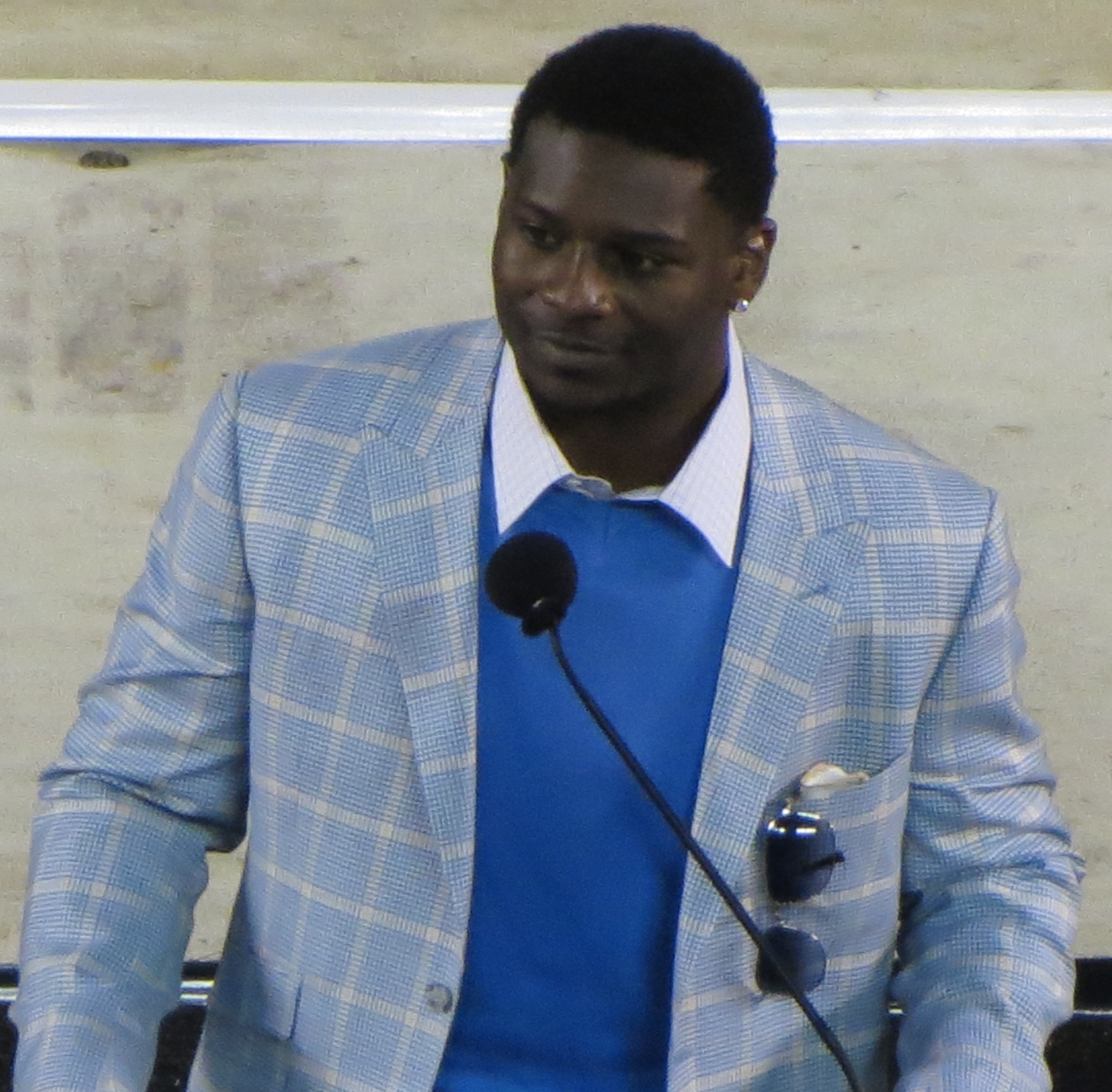
Tomlinson at The Celebration of Life for Junior Seau held at Qualcomm Stadium in 2012

Tomlinson's contract with the Jets expired after the 2011 season. In the aftermath of the season-ending loss in Miami, he said that he would need three or four weeks to decide whether to retire or not. On May 11, Tomlinson returned to Qualcomm Stadium in San Diego to speak at a memorial for former Charger Junior Seau, who had been a positive influence on Tomlinson during his rookie season. On June 18, he signed a ceremonial one-day contract with the San Diego Chargers and then immediately announced his retirement. Chargers president Dean Spanos said that no other Charger would ever wear Tomlinson's No. 21.

Former teammates including Rivers, Gates and three offensive linemen from his 2006 season were present at Tomlinson's farewell press conference, as were his wife, mother and children. Recalling the words of Seau at his own retirement, Tomlinson described the act as graduating to the next phase of his life. Of his failure to win a Super Bowl, he said, "I'm OK with never winning a Super Bowl championship. I know we've got many memories that we can call championship days."

=== Legacy and playing style ===
At the time of his retirement, Tomlinson ranked fifth in NFL history in career rushing attempts (3,174) and yards (13,684), and second in career rushing touchdowns (145). He had 47 100-yard rushing games, and three 100-yard receiving games. He also ranked third for receptions by a running back, catching 624 passes for 4,772 yards and a further 17 touchdowns. Overall, he ranked fourth in career touches (3,798), fifth in yards from scrimmage (18,456), and third in total touchdowns (162). He was only the second player to rush for at least 13,000 yards and catch passes for at least 4,000 yards, following Payton. Completing his reputation as a versatile back, Tomlinson completed 8 of 12 passing attempts in his career for seven touchdowns and no interceptions. Only Payton, with eight, had more touchdown passes among non-quarterbacks in the Super Bowl era. His playoff performances were less impressive, as he was injured in 2007 and 2008 and only rushed for 100 yards once in ten postseason games.

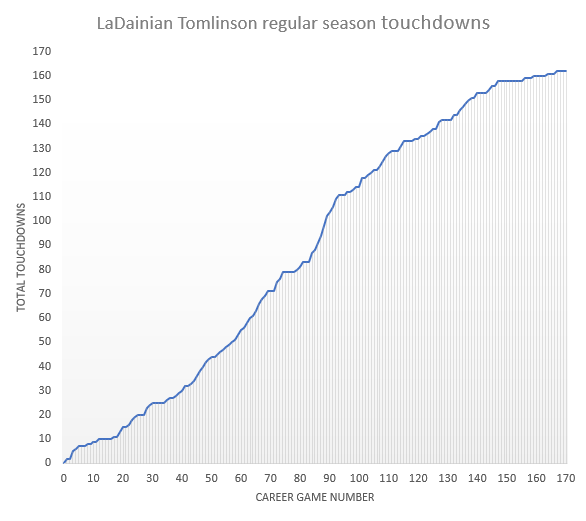
Chart showing Tomlinson's career touchdown tally after each game of his career. Rushing and receiving touchdowns are both included.

Tomlinson was noted for consistently playing well against the Oakland Raiders. In nineteen games against them, he rushed for 2,055 yards, at an average of 108.2 yards per game, well above his career average of 80.5 yards per game. He also rushed for 22 touchdowns, caught four, and threw another three, in each case more than his total against any other single team.

An elusive runner in the open field who would use stiff arms to break tackles, Tomlinson was also effective as a power back on inside runs. In goal-line situations, he would often leap directly over the line of scrimmage to score. He wore a distinctive dark visor for the majority of his career, to prevent migraines caused by stadium lights; this benefitted him as it prevented defenders from reading his eyes. When scoring, Tomlinson would frequently perform his own "teardrop" celebration, placing his left hand behind his head and flipping the ball with his right. He was often known by his initials, L.T., a nickname he shared with Hall of Fame New York Giants linebacker Lawrence Taylor.

In 2005, Schottenheimer described Tomlinson as the finest running back he'd seen, arguing that past greats such as Jim Brown and Gale Sayers hadn't had to contend with defenders of the same size and speed. When Tomlinson's number was retired in 2015, a trio of analysts on NFL.com placed him 3rd, 7th, and 8th respectively on their lists of top running backs in the Super Bowl era. In 2021, the statistical site Pro-Football-Reference.com ranked him as the fifth-best running back in NFL history. An NFL Network show, The Top 100: NFL's Greatest Players, aired in 2010 and ranked Tomlinson No. 61 among all positions, while a 2019 USA Today poll placed him at No. 54. However, he was not among the ten running backs named to the NFL 100th Anniversary All-Time Team.

The Chargers formally retired his number in 2015, while also inducting him into their Hall of Fame. Tomlinson was inducted into the Pro Football Hall of Fame in 2017, his first year of eligibility. After thanking his family, as well as former coaches and teammates, Tomlinson spoke about his ancestors who had worked as slaves in a plantation in Tomlinson Hill and issued a call for racial unity, saying, "On America's team, let's not choose to be against one another. Let's choose to be for one another. My great‑great‑great‑grandfather had no choice. We have one. I pray we dedicate ourselves to be the best team we can be, working and living together, representing the highest ideals of mankind, leading the way for all nations to follow."

== Career statistics ==
Legend
	AP NFL MVP & OPOTY
	NFL record
	Led the league
**Bold**	Career high

=== NFL ===
==== Regular season ====
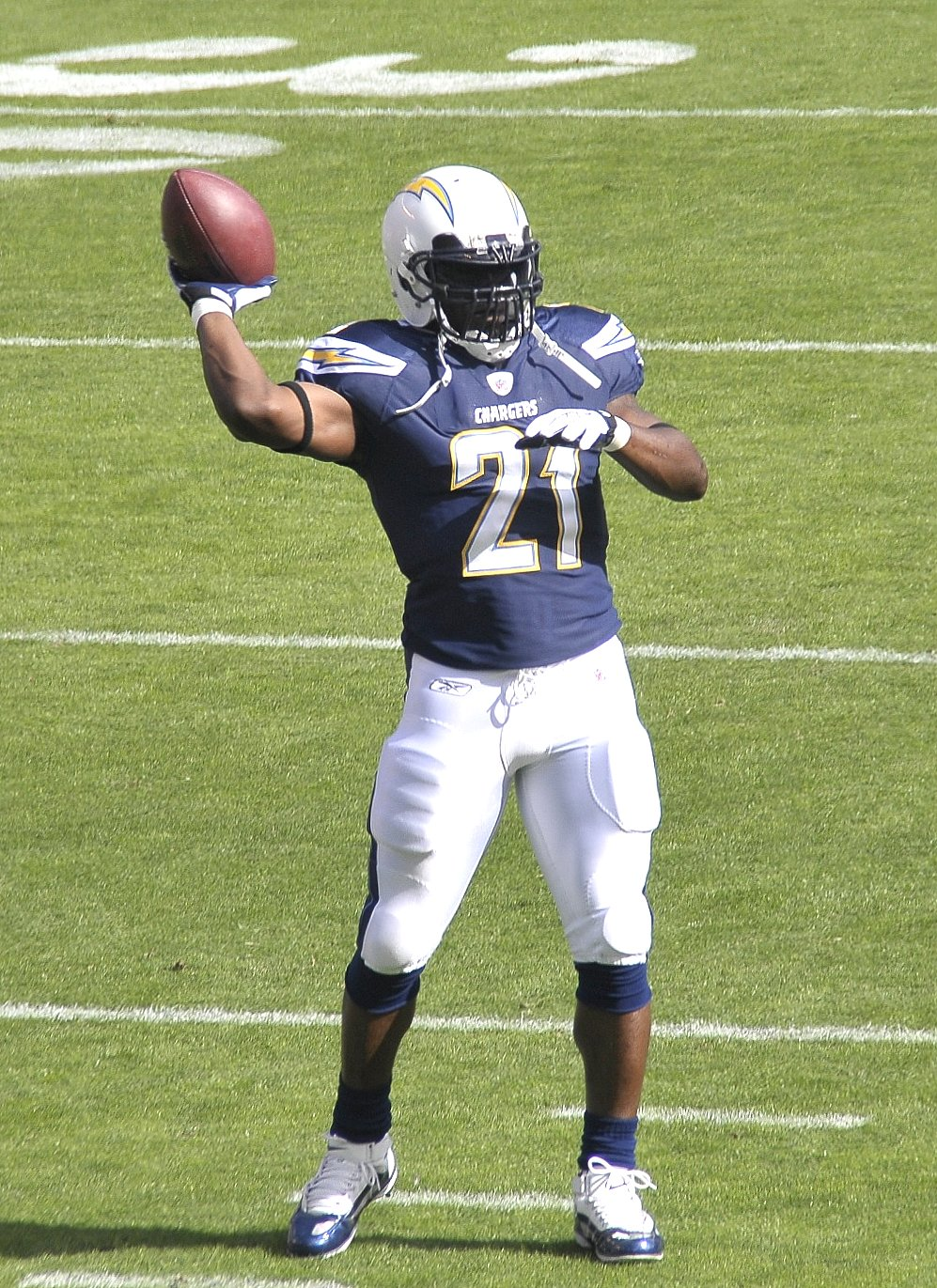
Tomlinson threw for seven touchdowns in his career.

Year	Team	Games		Rushing					Receiving					Passing							Fumbles (Note: Fumbles lost data taken from Pro Football Reference career game log)	
Year	Team	GP	GS	Att	Yds	Avg	Lng	TD	Rec	Yds	Avg	Lng	TD	Cmp	Att	Pct	Yds	TD	Int	Rtg	Fum	Lost
2001	SD	16	16	339	1,236	3.6	54	10	59	367	6.2	27	0	—	—	—	—	—	—	—	**8**	**5**
2002	SD	16	16	**372**	1,683	4.5	76	14	79	489	6.2	30	1	—	—	—	—	—	—	—	3	1
2003	SD	16	16	313	1,645	**5.3**	73	13	**100**	**725**	7.3	73	**4**	1	1	**100.0**	21	1	0	**158.3**	2	0
2004	SD	15	15	339	1,335	3.9	42	17	53	441	8.3	**74**	1	1	2	50.0	38	0	0	95.8	6	2
2005	SD	16	16	339	1,462	4.3	62	18	51	370	7.3	41	2	**3**	**4**	75.0	**47**	**3**	0	153.1	3	1
2006	SD	16	16	348	**1,815**	5.2	**85**	**28**	56	508	9.1	51	3	2	3	66.7	20	2	0	125.0	2	1
2007	SD	16	16	315	1,474	4.7	49	15	60	475	7.9	36	3	1	1	**100.0**	17	1	0	**158.3**	0	0
2008	SD	16	16	292	1,110	3.8	45	11	52	426	8.2	32	1	—	—	—	—	—	—	—	1	0
2009	SD	14	14	223	730	3.3	36	12	20	154	7.7	36	0	0	1	0.0	0	0	0	39.6	2	2
2010	NYJ	15	13	219	914	4.2	31	6	52	368	7.1	21	0	—	—	—	—	—	—	—	4	0
2011	NYJ	14	1	75	280	3.7	20	1	42	449	**10.7**	**74**	2	—	—	—	—	—	—	—	0	0
Career		170	155	3,174	13,684	4.3	85	145	624	4,772	7.6	74	17	8	12	66.7	143	7	0	146.9	31	12

==== Postseason ====
Year	Team	Games		Rushing					Receiving					Fumbles	
Year	Team	GP	GS	Att	Yds	Avg	Lng	TD	Rec	Yds	Avg	Lng	TD	Fum	Lost
2004	SD	1	1	26	80	3.1	12	0	**9**	53	5.9	10	0	0	0
2006	SD	1	1	23	123	**5.3**	15	**2**	2	**64**	**32.0**	**58**	0	0	0
2007	SD	3	3	30	75	2.5	12	1	5	40	8.0	20	0	1	0
2008	SD	1	1	5	25	5.0	13	1	—	—	—	—	—	0	0
2009	SD	1	1	12	24	2.0	5	0	3	0	0.0	3	0	0	0
2010	NYJ	3	3	**35**	**141**	4.0	**23**	**2**	6	19	3.2	13	**1**	**1**	0
Career		10	10	131	468	3.6	23	6	25	176	7.0	58	1	2	0

=== College ===
Legend
Led the NCAA

Season	Team	GP	Rushing				Receiving		
Season	Team	GP	Att	Yds	Avg	TD	Rec	Yds	TD
1997	TCU	11	126	538	4.3	6	11	**109**	0
1998 (Note: Not including bowl stats: 12 carries, 34 yards; 1 reception, 25 yards.)	TCU	11	144	717	5.0	8	6	34	0
1999 (Note: Not including bowl stats: 36 carries, 124 yards, 2 touchdowns; 4 receptions, 29 yards.)	TCU	11	268	1,850	**6.9**	18	**12**	55	0
2000 (Note: Not including bowl stats: 28 carries, 118 yards, 2 touchdowns.)	TCU	11	**369**	**2,158**	5.8	**22**	10	40	0
Totals (Note: Bowl games not included, but noted separately in the Season column. College football did not include statistics from these until 2002.)		44	907	5,263	5.8	54	39	238	0

== Career highlights ==
=== Awards and honors ===
Tomlinson being tackled by Jeremiah Trotter at the 2006 Pro Bowl.

NFL

- Pro Football Hall of Fame inductee (2017)
- NFL MVP (2006)
- SN NFL Player of the Year (2006)
- NFL Offensive Player of the Year (2006)
- Walter Payton Man of the Year (2006)
- 3× First-team Associated Press All-Pro (2004, 2006, 2007)
- 3× Second-team Associated Press All-Pro (2002, 2003, 2005)
- 5× Pro Bowl (2002, 2004, 2005, 2006, 2007)
- 2× NFL rushing leader (2006, 2007)
- NFL 2000s All-Decade Team
- FedEx Ground Player of the Year (2006)
- No. 61 on The Top 100: NFL's Greatest Players
- San Diego Chargers 50th Anniversary Team (2009)
- Inducted into the San Diego Chargers Hall of Fame (2015)
- No. 21 retired by Chargers (2015)
- The Sporting News Athlete of the Year (2006)
- Bert Bell Award (2006)
- Best Record-Breaking Performance ESPY Award (2007)
- PFWA Good Guy Award (2007)
- Best Male Athlete ESPY Award (2007)
- Bart Starr Man of the Year Award (2008)
- 2× Dennis Byrd Most Inspirational Player Award (2010, 2011)
- 11× AFC Offensive Player of the Week: (2002, Week 4), (2002, Week 13), (2003, Week 7), (2005, Week 3), (2005, Week 6), (2005, Week 12), (2006, Week 9), (2006, Week 11), (2006, Week 14), (2006, Week 15), (2010, Week 4)
- 9× Pro Football Weekly NFL Offensive Player of the Week: (2002, Week 13), (2003, Week 7) (2003, Week 17), (2005, Week 3), (2005, Week 6), (2005, Week 9), (2006, Week 11), (2006, Week 15), (2007, Week 13)
- AFC Offensive Player of the Month: (November 2006)

College

- Consensus first-team All-American (2000)
- Second-team All-American (1999)
- Doak Walker Award (2000)
- Jim Brown Trophy (2000)
- 2× NCAA rushing yards leader (1999, 2000)
- 2× All-WAC first-team (1999–2000)
- 2× WAC Offensive Player Of the Year (1999–2000)
- Mobile Alabama Bowl Most Valuable Player (2000)
- Senior Bowl Most Valuable Player (2001)
- College Football Hall of Fame inductee (2014)

=== Records ===
==== NFL records ====
- Most single season touchdowns: 31 (2006)
- Most single season rushing touchdowns: 28 (2006)
- Most points scored in a single season: 186 (2006)
- Most consecutive regular season games with a rushing touchdown: 18 (2004–2005)
- Most consecutive regular season games with a touchdown: 18 (2004–2005; tied with Lenny Moore)
- Most consecutive games with 2+ touchdowns: 8 (2006)
- Most consecutive games with 3+ touchdowns: 4 (2006)
- Most consecutive games with 4+ touchdowns: 2 (2006; tied with Marshall Faulk and Jim Taylor)
- Most games with 200+ yards from scrimmage, season: 5 (2003)
- Most consecutive seasons with 1,200+ or more yards rushing: 7 (2001–2007; tied with Eric Dickerson)
- Most consecutive seasons with 10+ rushing touchdowns: 9 (2001–2009)
- Most consecutive seasons with 15+ touchdowns: 6 (2002–2007)
- Most overtime touchdowns, career: 3 (2002, 2005, 2007; tied with Davante Adams)
- Most games with 2+ rushing touchdowns, career: 38 games
- Most games with 3+ rushing touchdowns, career: 12 games
- Fastest player to gain 15,000 yards from scrimmage: 121 games played
- Fastest player to score 100 touchdowns: 89 games played
- Fastest player to score 150 touchdowns: 137 games played

==== Franchise records ====
The Chargers credit Tomlinson with numerous records. Career figures discount his two seasons with the New York Jets.

- Rush Attempts: career (2,880), season (372 in 2002), game (39 in 2002; tied with Marion Butts), playoff game (26 in 2004 wild card round).
- Rush Yards: career (12,490), season (1,815 in 2006), game (243 in 2003).
- Rushing TDs: career (138), season (28 in 2006), game (4, achieved three times; tied with Clarence Williams and Chuck Muncie), playoffs (4).
- 100+ yard rushing games: career (46), season (10 in 2006), consecutive (9 in 2006).
- 200+ yard rushing games: career (4).
- Yds from Scrimmage: career (16,445), season (2,370 in 2003), game (271 on December 1, 2002, against the Denver Broncos).
- Total TDs: career (153), season (31 in 2006), playoffs (4, tied with three others).
- 100+ yards from scrimmage games: career (79), season (14 in 2006), consecutive (11, 2006).
- 200+ yards from scrimmage games: career (12).
- Points: season (186 in 2006)

== Personal life ==
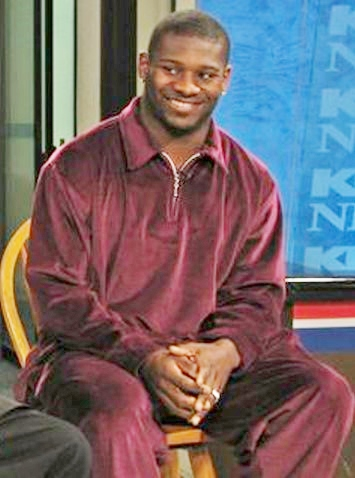
Tomlinson in 2004

External videos
- After Words interview with Chris Tomlinson on Tomlinson Hill, conducted by Lavar Tomlinson, June 23, 2014, C-SPAN

Tomlinson is a Christian. Tomlinson was introduced to his future wife, LaTorsha Oakley, while the two were students at TCU. The couple married on March 21, 2003, and have two children: a son born in 2010 and a daughter in 2011. In 2007, Tomlinson's father Oliver Tomlinson and brother-in-law Ronald McClain died in an auto accident.

During his playing career, Tomlinson was featured in commercials for Nike, Campbell Soup, and Vizio. In April 2007, CNBC reported that Tomlinson turned down a request to become the cover athlete for EA Sports' Madden NFL 08 video game, as the money offered was not enough to justify the promotional work involved.

In August 2012, Tomlinson joined the cast of NFL Network's Sunday morning show "First on the Field" as an analyst. As of 2022, he is still with the network. He covers Chargers preseason games as an analyst with CBS.

Tomlinson wrote the foreword for Chris Tomlinson's book Tomlinson Hill, which traces the story of two families—one white and one black—from a plantation in Tomlinson Hill, Texas. The plantation was owned by Chris' great-great-grandparents, while LaDainian descended from a slave owned by Chris' ancestors. In 2016, Tomlinson was cast in the feature film God Bless the Broken Road. While originally announced for a 2016 release, it was finally released in September 2018.

Tomlinson has his own charitable foundation. The foundation helps high school and college students, provides meals for people who are homeless or poor, and raises money for after-school programs and other causes. It focuses its efforts in Los Angeles, San Diego, and Texas. The charity was cited as a reason for Tomlinson receiving the Bart Starr Award in 2008.

In 2017, the Los Angeles Chargers announced that Tomlinson was joining the team as a special assistant to ownership. The role involves attempting to build a new fanbase after the Chargers' move to Los Angeles.

Tomlinson's nephew, Tre Tomlinson, followed in his footsteps by playing at TCU, where he earned All-Big 12 honors three times playing cornerback and won the Jim Thorpe Award in 2022 as the nation's best defensive back. Tre was drafted in the sixth round of the 2023 NFL draft by the Los Angeles Rams.

== See also ==
- List of NCAA Division I FBS career rushing touchdowns leaders
- List of college football yearly rushing leaders

== Bibliography ==
- Paris, Jay (2016). Game of my life: San Diego Chargers (Ebook ed.). Sports Publishing. ISBN 978-1-61321-922-5.
- Los Angeles Chargers Media Guide (Online). Los Angeles Chargers. 2022.

Preceded by Shaun Alexander	Best Record-Breaking Performance ESPY Award; 2007	Succeeded by Brett Favre
Preceded by Shaun Alexander	Best NFL Player ESPY Award; 2007	Succeeded by Tom Brady
