= Curtis Fuller (American football) =

American football player and coach (born 1978)

Appalachian State Mountaineers
- Title: Cornerbacks coach

Personal information
- Born: July 25, 1978 (age 48); Fort Worth, Texas, U.S.
- Listed height: 5 ft 10 in (1.78 m)
- Listed weight: 191 lb (87 kg)

Career information
- High school: Fort Worth Christian
- College: TCU
- NFL draft: 2001: 4th round, 127th overall pick

Career history

Playing
- Seattle Seahawks (2001–2002); Green Bay Packers (2003–2004); Carolina Panthers (2004)

Coaching
- Oakland Raiders (2007) (Asst spt); Green Bay Packers (2009–2010) (Asst spt / Def asst); Tennessee Titans (2011) (Asst DB); Carolina Panthers (2013–2017) (Asst DB / Asst spt / DB coach); Arizona Cardinals (2018) (Def asst LB/DB's); Myers Park High School (2019) (DB coach Charlotte, NC); Myers Park High School (2020) (DC Charlotte, NC); Myers Park High School (2021) (Head coach Charlotte, NC); Houston Texans (2022) (Minority intern); Texas A&M-Commerce (2022) (Safeties coach); Coastal Carolina University (2023–2024) (Cornerbacks coach); Appalachian State University (2025–present) (Defensive Pass Game Coordinator/Defensive Backs)

Career NFL statistics
- Tackles: 61
- Interceptions: 1
- INT yards: 3
- Stats at Pro Football Reference

Curtis Lee Fuller (born July 25, 1978) is an American former professional football player who was a safety in the National Football League (NFL). He was selected by the Seattle Seahawks in the fourth round of the 2001 NFL draft.

He played college football for the TCU Horned Frogs. He played safety. Fuller wore the number 18 and appeared in 32 total games during his time at TCU between the seasons of 1998 till 2000. He made 243 tackles and 3 interceptions during his time at TCU. During the 2000 season TCU ranked #2 in total ranked defensive and #1 in takeaways. During that time he was the president of Fellowship of Christian Athletes. He also played for a season at TJC during 1996-1997 before committing to TCU in 1998.

Fuller went on to play for the Green Bay Packers and Carolina Panthers. He was a scout for the Dallas Cowboys before launching his NFL coaching career. Fuller served as assistant coach for the Oakland Raiders, Green Bay Packers, Tennessee Titans, Carolina Panthers, and the Arizona Cardinals.

Fuller and the Green Bay Packers ended their 2010 season with a Super Bowl 45 victory over the Pittsburgh Steelers. The Packers defeated their opponents with a score of 31–25.

When serving as an assistant coach for the Panthers, Fuller secured his second Super Bowl opportunity. He and the Panthers reached Super Bowl 50 on February 7, 2016. The Panthers fell to the Denver Broncos by a score of 24–10. During his time with the Carolina Panthers he got the chance to assistant coach at the 2014 Pro Bowl.

Since his time with the Panthers, Fuller has coached the Myers Park High School football team in Charlotte, NC. In the 2019 season, he was the DB coach. In the next season of 2020, he became the defensive coordinator. In his final season of 2021, he was the head coach of Myers Park. He coached, mentored, and prepared young athletes to stand out for the college draft.

In March 2022, Fuller was hired as the safeties coach at Texas A&M-Commerce.

In January 2023, Fuller was hired as the cornerback coach at Coastal Carolina University.

In December of 2024, Fuller was hired as the cornerback coach for the Appalachian State Mountaineers football team.

Throughout his coaching career, Fuller has worked with several prominent NFL players, including Josh Norman, James Bradberry, Budda Baker, Mike Adams (safety), Charles Woodson, Cortland Finnegan, Colin Jones (American football), Jason McCourty, Patrick Peterson, Captain Munnerlyn, and Michael Griffin (American football).
