= Shawn Worthen =

American football player (born 1978)

No. 95
- Position: Defensive tackle

Personal information
- Born: September 12, 1978 (age 48); San Antonio, Texas, U.S.
- Listed height: 6 ft 0 in (1.83 m)
- Listed weight: 316 lb (143 kg)

Career information
- High school: Alamo Heights (San Antonio)
- College: TCU
- NFL draft: 2001: 4th round, 130th overall pick

Career history
- Minnesota Vikings (2001); Houston Texans (2002)

Career NFL statistics
- Games played: 4
- Stats at Pro Football Reference

Shawn Worthen (born September 12, 1978) is an American former professional football player who was a defensive tackle in the National Football League (NFL). He played college football for the TCU Horned Frogs and was selected by the Minnesota Vikings in the fourth round of the 2001 NFL draft. He also played for the Houston Texans in 2002. He is currently Associate Athletics Director of Athletic Academic Services at TCU.
