= Michael Keathley =

American football player (born 1978)

No. 61
- Position: Guard

Personal information
- Born: March 9, 1978 (age 48); Arlington, Texas
- Listed height: 6 ft 4 in (1.93 m)
- Listed weight: 296 lb (134 kg)

Career information
- High school: Glen Rose (Glen Rose, Texas)
- College: TCU
- NFL draft: 2001: undrafted

Career history
- San Diego Chargers (2001–2002); Houston Texans (2003); San Diego Chargers (2003); Chicago Bears (2004)*
- * Offseason or practice squad member only

Career NFL statistics
- Games played: 36
- Games started: 4
- Stats at Pro Football Reference

Michael Dean Keathley (born March 9, 1978) is an American former professional football player who was a guard for the San Diego Chargers of the National Football League (NFL). He played college football for the TCU Horned Frogs.

In 2003, Keathley was claimed by the Houston Texans after being waived by the Chargers, but he did not play any games for the Texans and re-signed with the Chargers later that year. In 2004, Keathley signed a one-year contract with the Chicago Bears, though he did not play.

Keathley played college football at Texas Christian University.

After his career in the NFL, he settled in Athens, Pennsylvania on his ranch, the Triple K Ranch, with his wife and three sons. He began to volunteer as a football coach; he has coached all three of his sons in high school football.
