= LaTarence Dunbar =

American football player and sprinter (born 1980)

No. 82
- Position: Wide receiver

Personal information
- Born: August 15, 1980 (age 46); Dallas, Texas, U.S.
- Listed height: 5 ft 11 in (1.80 m)
- Listed weight: 196 lb (89 kg)

Career information
- High school: Dallas (TX) South Oak Cliff
- College: TCU
- NFL draft: 2003: 6th round, 196th overall pick

Career history
- Atlanta Falcons (2003); Cleveland Browns (2004)*; Seattle Seahawks (2004)*; Houston Texans (2005)*
- * Offseason or practice squad member only
- Stats at Pro Football Reference

LaTarence Eugene Dunbar (born August 15, 1980) is an American former professional football wide receiver who played in the National Football League (NFL). He played college football, and was also a sprinter, at Texas Christian University.

== Early life ==
Dunbar grew up in Dallas, Texas and graduated in 1998 from South Oak Cliff High School.

While in high school, he starred at wide receiver and also finished among the top 5 in the state in both the 100 meter high hurdles (14.34 seconds) and the 300 meter high hurdles (36.43 seconds).

He was then recruited to play football and run track at TCU.

== College career ==
After a red shirt year and a year as a back-up, Dunlap started for three years as a wide receiver for TCU.

While playing football at TCU, Dunbar also ran track, winning the 60 meter high hurdles at the 2002 Southwest Track Invitational. As noted on the Conference USA website, "the victory for Dunbar was a bit of a surprise, as the TCU football standout practiced for just two days before taking the track on Saturday." Dunbar later set the school record in that event (running the 60 meter high hurdles in 7.88 seconds); it was a school record not broken for 14 years.

== Professional career ==
Dunbar was selected by the Atlanta Falcons in the sixth round, with the 196th overall pick, of the 2003 NFL Draft. He officially signed with the team on June 16, 2003. He played in five games for the Falcons in 2003, recording four solo tackles. Dunbar was placed on injured reserve on December 5, 2003. He was waived on June 2, 2004.

Dunbar signed with the Cleveland Browns on June 14, 2004. He was waived on August 16, 2004.

Dunbar was signed to the practice squad of the Seattle Seahawks on December 1, 2004.

Dunbar signed with the Houston Texans on June 8, 2005. He was waived/injured by the Texans on August 30 and reverted to injured reserve the next day. He was waived on September 3, 2005.
