= George Layne =

American football player (born 1978)

No. 38, 41
- Position: Fullback

Personal information
- Born: October 9, 1978 (age 48); Alvin, Texas, U.S.

Career information
- College: TCU
- NFL draft: 2001: 4th round, 108th overall pick

Career history
- Kansas City Chiefs (2001)*; Atlanta Falcons (2001–2003); San Diego Chargers (2004); Atlanta Falcons (2004)
- * Offseason or practice squad member only

Career NFL statistics
- Carries: 3
- Yards: 32
- Receptions: 4
- Yards: 20
- Stats at Pro Football Reference

George Langford Layne (born October 9, 1978) is an American former professional football player who was a fullback in the National Football League (NFL). He was selected by the Kansas City Chiefs in the fourth round of the 2001 NFL draft after playing college football for the TCU Horned Frogs. He played for the Atlanta Falcons and San Diego Chargers.
