= Fresno State Bulldogs =

Intercollegiate sports teams of California State University, Fresno

- University: California State University, Fresno
- Nickname: Bulldogs
- NCAA: Division I (FBS)
- Conference: Pac-12 (primary); GCC (women's water polo); Big 12 (women's equestrian)
- Athletic director: Garrett Klassy
- Location: Fresno, California
- Varsity teams: 22
- Football stadium: Valley Children's Stadium
- Basketball arena: Save Mart Center
- Baseball stadium: Pete Beiden Field at Bob Bennett Stadium
- Softball stadium: Margie Wright Diamond
- Soccer stadium: Fresno State Soccer and Lacrosse Stadium
- Other venues: Dragonfly Golf Club; Fresno State Aquatics Center; Student Horse Center; Warmerdam Field; Wathen Tennis Center; Woodward Park
- Colors: Cardinal red and blue
- Mascot: Time Out / Victor E.
- Fight song: Fight Varsity
- Website: gobulldogs.com

The Fresno State Bulldogs are the intercollegiate athletic teams that represent California State University, Fresno (commonly referred to as Fresno State). The university is a member of NCAA Division I's Pac-12 Conference (Pac-12). It was a member of the Mountain West Conference from 2013 to 2025 and the Western Athletic Conference from 1992 until 2012, when it left for the Mountain West alongside fellow WAC member Nevada.

Fresno State had also been a member of the Big West Conference since the 1969–70 (the conference was known as the Pacific Coast Athletic Association at that time until 1988), and a member of the California Collegiate Athletic Association from its beginning in the 1939–40 season (when Fresno State was in NCAA Division II).

The university has won two NCAA Division I Championships, in softball (1998) and baseball (2008).

Fresno State currently sponsors six men's and eleven women's sports at the varsity level.

In October 2020, Fresno State announced the elimination of three programs due to COVID-19: women's lacrosse, men's tennis, and wrestling.

== Sports sponsored ==
Men's sports	Women's sports
Baseball	Basketball
Basketball	Cross Country
Cross Country	Equestrian
Football	Golf
Golf	Soccer
Track and field^{1}	Softball
	Swimming and diving
	Tennis
	Track and field^{1}
	Volleyball
	Water polo
^{1} – includes both indoor and outdoor

All varsity teams representing Fresno State participate in the Mountain West Conference for conference play excluding water polo in the Golden Coast Conference, and equestrian in the Big 12 Conference.

=== Football ===
Fresno State's football team is currently coached by Matt Entz. During its tenure in the Western Athletic Conference (WAC) from 1992 to 2011, it shared three WAC titles; in 1992 and 1993 under Head Coach Jim Sweeney, and in 1999 with the University of Hawaiʻi, the only title for Pat Hill. However, Hill garnered a reputation for being willing to play any top-ranked opponent, anytime, anywhere (usually on the opponent's field). Fresno State (as of December 2005) achieved success with a 10–8 record against teams from BCS conferences, the most by any program not in a BCS conference. This has provided the Bulldogs a following among college football fans who admire its willingness to challenge the best teams (and has resulted in the Bulldogs being featured more regularly on college football TV programs than most BCS non-AQ conference teams). However, their success in their non-conference games hasn't translated to championships in conference play. After 1999, the Bulldogs did not win the WAC title before leaving for the MW in 2012. In 2013, the first season after the MW expanded to 12 football members and launched a conference championship game, the Bulldogs claimed the MW title.

Fresno State often travels between 10,000-20,000 miles (30,000 km) during its football season, between its MW games and its non-conference schedule, as the conference itself is spread from the Colorado Front Range to Honolulu. During Fresno State's time in the WAC, its travel was on the higher end of the range, as that conference's footprint extended even farther to the east than that of the MW (as far as Ruston, Louisiana, home of Louisiana Tech University). During their time in the Mountain West Conference, Boise State and Hawaiʻi were two of Fresno State's major in-conference rivals. Boise State joined the MW in 2011, a year before Fresno State, while Hawaiʻi joined for football only at the same time Fresno State joined in all sports. Boise State has remained Fresno State’s major in-conference rival when they both joined the Pac-12 Conference in 2026.

The Fresno State Bulldogs men's football team have an NCAA Division I FBS Tournament record of 12–13 through twenty-four appearances.

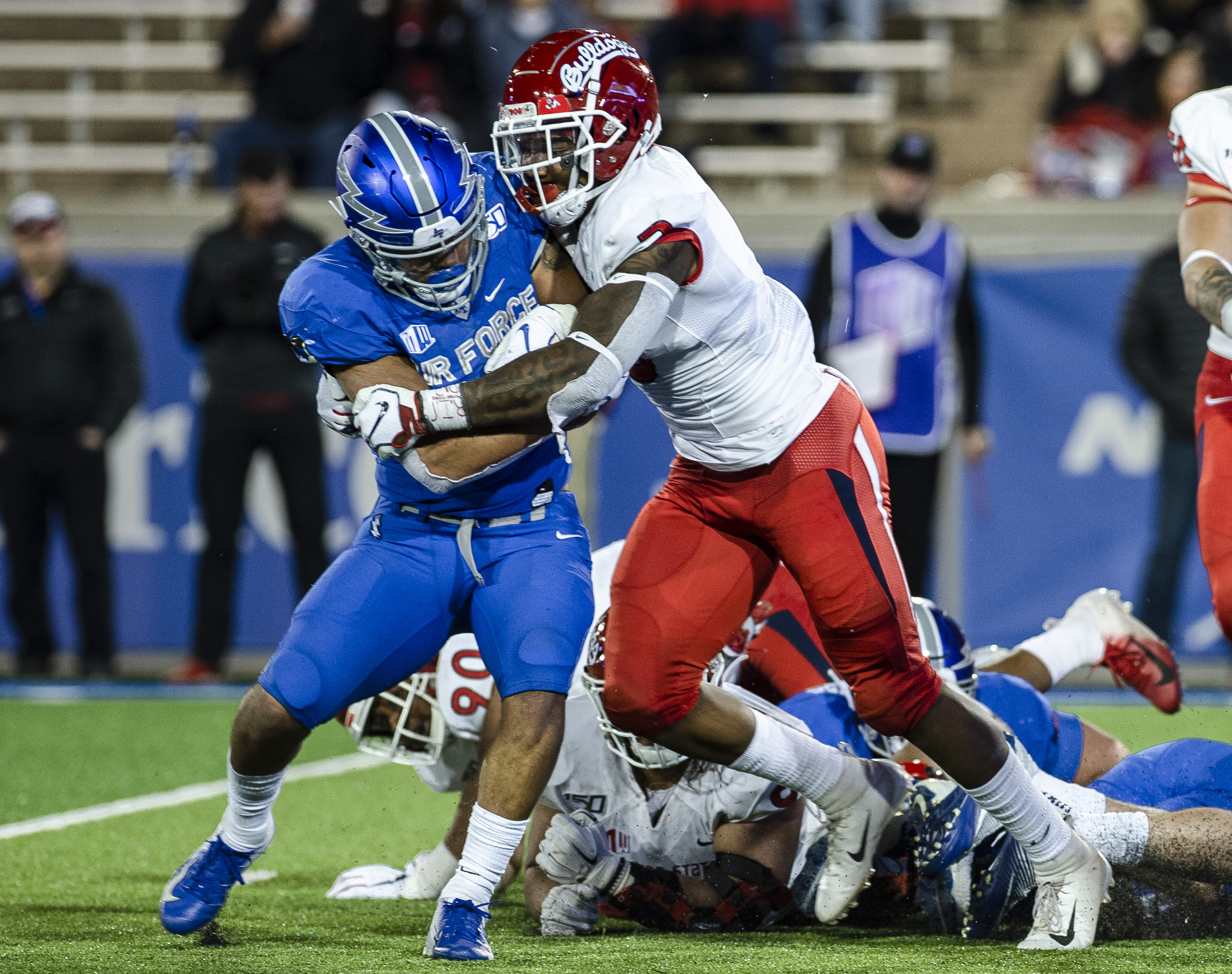
Fresno v Air Force game in 2005

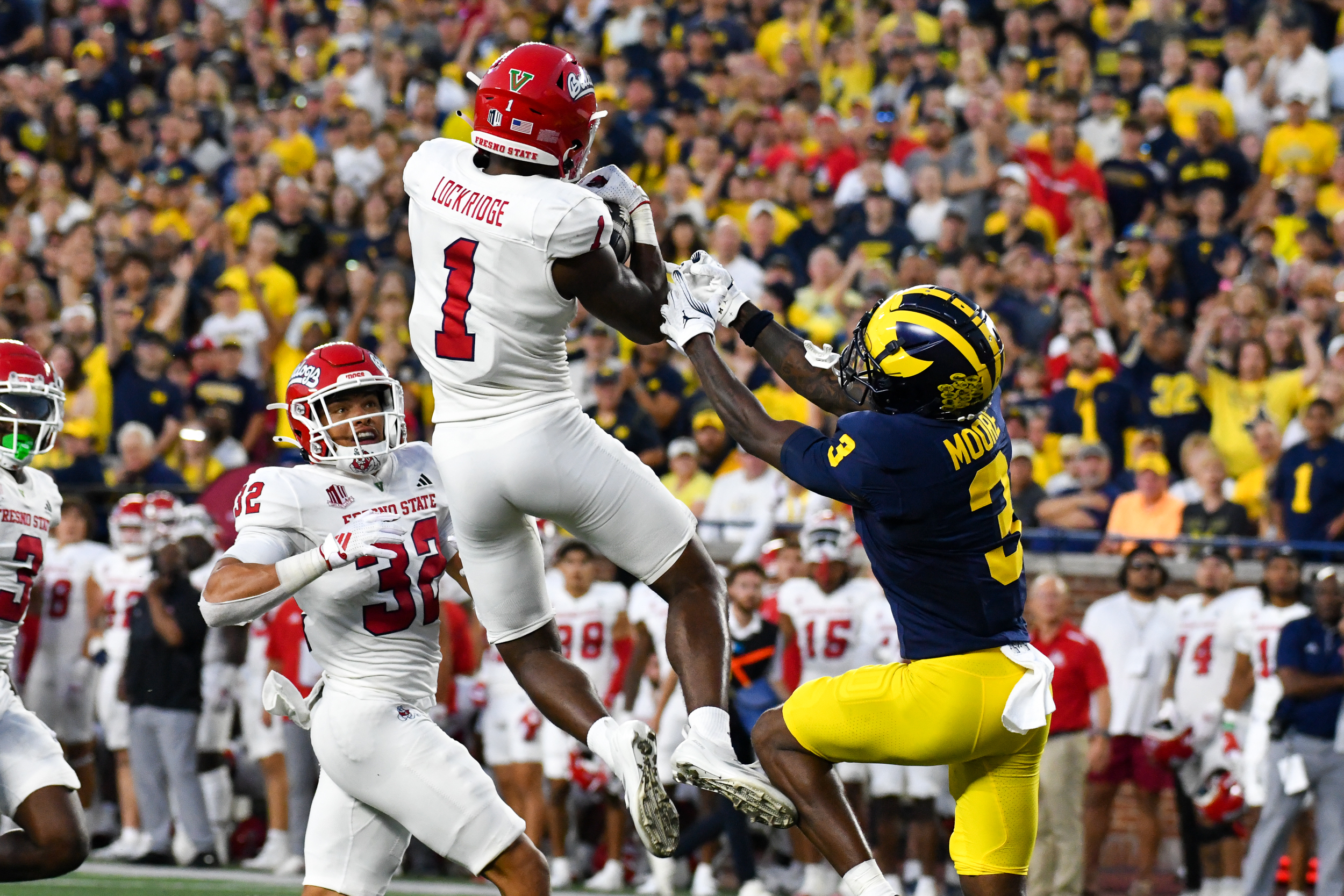
Fresno v Michigan in 2024

Season	Coach	Bowl	Opponent	Result
1945	Alvin Pierson	Raisin Bowl	Drake	L 12–13
1961	Cecil Coleman	Mercy Bowl	Bowling Green	W 36–6
1982	Jim Sweeney	California Bowl	Bowling Green	W 29–28
1985	Jim Sweeney	California Bowl	Bowling Green	W 51–7
1988	Jim Sweeney	California Bowl	Western Michigan	W 35–30
1989	Jim Sweeney	California Bowl	Ball State	W 27–6
1991	Jim Sweeney	California Bowl	Bowling Green	L 21–28
1992	Jim Sweeney	Freedom Bowl	USC	W 24–7
1993	Jim Sweeney	Aloha Bowl	Colorado	L 30–41
1999	Pat Hill	Las Vegas Bowl	Utah	L 16–17
2000	Pat Hill	Silicon Valley Bowl	Air Force	L 34–37
2001	Pat Hill	Silicon Valley Bowl	Michigan State	L 35–44
2002	Pat Hill	Silicon Valley Bowl	Georgia Tech	W 30–21
2003	Pat Hill	Silicon Valley Bowl	UCLA	W 17–9
2004	Pat Hill	MPC Computers Bowl	Virginia	W 37–34
2005	Pat Hill	Liberty Bowl	Tulsa	L 24–31
2007	Pat Hill	Humanitarian Bowl	Georgia Tech	W 40–28
2008	Pat Hill	New Mexico Bowl	Colorado State	L 35–40
2009	Pat Hill	New Mexico Bowl	Wyoming	L 28–35
2010	Pat Hill	Humanitarian Bowl	Northern Illinois	L 17–40
2012	Tim DeRuyter	Hawaii Bowl	SMU	L 10–43
2013	Tim DeRuyter	Las Vegas Bowl	USC	L 20–45
2014	Tim DeRuyter	Hawaii Bowl	Rice	L 6–30
2017	Jeff Tedford	Hawaii Bowl	Houston	W 33–27
2018	Jeff Tedford	Las Vegas Bowl	Arizona State	W 31–20

=== Basketball ===
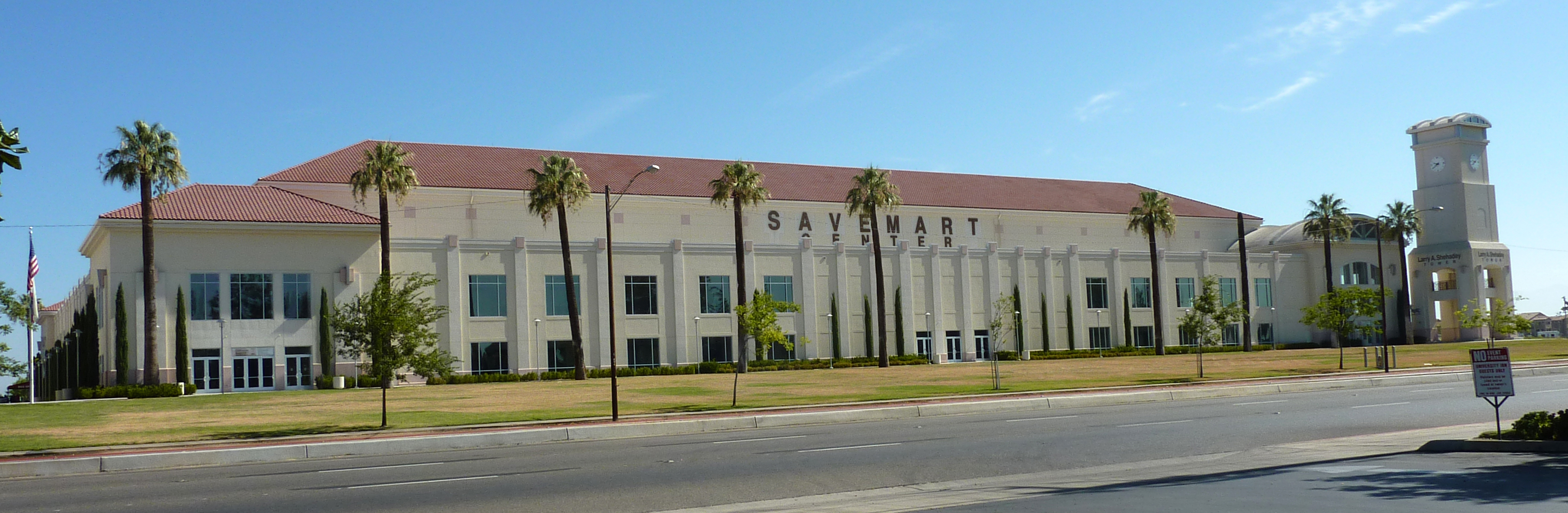
Save Mart Center

Bulldog basketball squads play at the Save Mart Center. This facility used to house the ECHL's Fresno Falcons hockey team and is regularly on the Pollstar list of top 25 concert and entertainment venues by attendance.

The Women's Basketball program had a period of significant success under coach Adrian Wiggins from 2005 to 2012. He is the only Fresno State coach in program history to not have a losing season and averaged 24.5 wins per season in his six full seasons. Wiggins guided the program to NCAA tournament appearances in 2008, 2009, 2010, 2011, and 2012. The bulldogs secured 5 conference wins in the western athletic conference before moving to the mountain west.

The Men's Basketball program achieved its greatest moment winning the 1983 National Invitational tournament championship. Coach Boyd Grant guided the Bulldogs through the 32 team NIT field, winning the final 69–60 over DePaul. Hundreds of fans known as the Red Wave followed the team from Fresno's Selland Arena, its home court at the time, to Madison Square Garden in New York. Jerry Tarkanian followed Grant as Coach. Coach Steve Cleveland took over in 2005 and made an immediate impact on the troubled basketball program which was still facing sanctions from the Jerry Tarkanian and Ray Lopes era. Cleveland's "Built to Last" approach placed a paramount emphasis on graduating student-athletes. Cleveland's system produced the program's first Academic All-District VIII honoree when sophomore forward Nedeljko Golubovic received the elite recognition in February 2009, which he repeated for back-to-back-to-back CoSIDA accolades as the only University Division student-athlete from a California college honored in any district in each season. In 2009, Golubovic was also the lone representative from a Western Athletic Conference school honored. The WAC also designated Golubovic and freshman guard Brandon Sperling for Academic All-WAC accolades for their accomplishments during 2008–09.

However, due to a lack of winning, and mounting pressure from the community, Coach Cleveland stepped down as Head Coach in 2011.

He was replaced by Rodney Terry, the top assistant from the University of Texas. Terry will be the 18th head coach in Bulldog history. Known as an outstanding recruiting and bench coach while at Texas, Terry's resume includes coaching two national players of the year and 11 appearances in the NCAA tournament.

=== Baseball ===
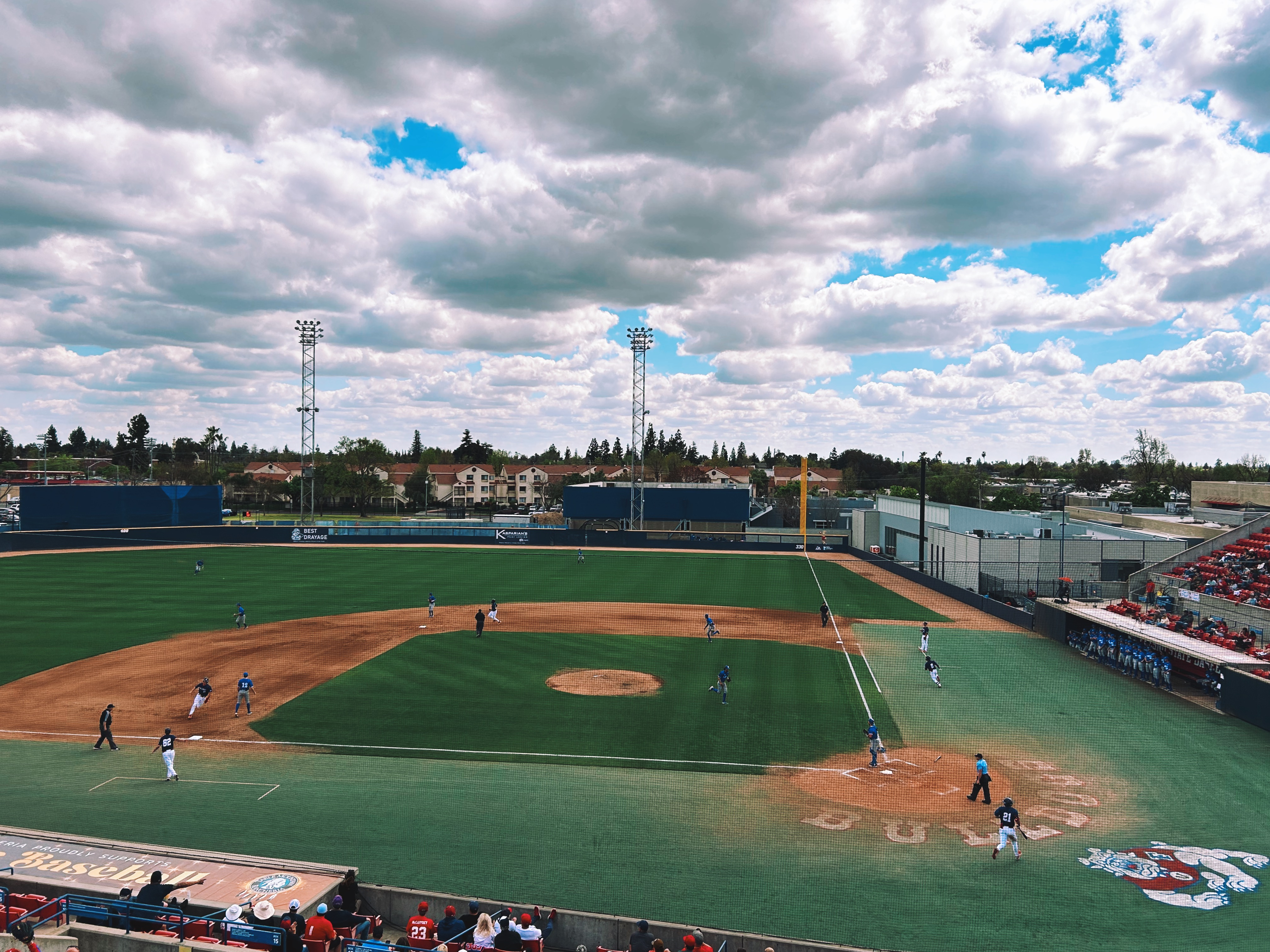
Fresno State game at Bob Bennett Stadium, April 2023

The Fresno State baseball team is currently coached by Mike Batesole and has made 4 trips to the College World Series in its history, most recently to the 2008 College World Series. On June 25, 2008, the Fresno State Bulldogs defeated the Georgia Bulldogs to win the 2008 College World Series.

Beiden Field was the former home of the Pacific Coast League (AAA) farm team of the San Francisco Giants (1998–2001). The Fresno Grizzlies moved to their current downtown stadium in May 2002. Beiden Field is often listed by Baseball America as a top-25 NCAA baseball facility. It hosted the 2006 WAC baseball tournament.

=== Cross country ===
The Fresno State Bulldogs men's cross country team appeared in the NCAA Division I Tournament one time, with that appearance being 22nd place in the 1973–74 school year. The Fresno State Bulldogs women's cross country team never made the NCAA Division I Tournament.

Year	Gender	Ranking	Points
1973	Men	No. 22	584

=== Soccer ===
The Fresno State Bulldogs women's soccer team have an NCAA Division I Tournament record of 0–4 through four appearances.

Year	Round	Opponent	Result
1999	First round	Cal Poly	L 1–2
2005	First round	Santa Clara	L 0–5
2008	First round	UCLA	L 0–5
2010	First round	UCF	L 1–2

=== Softball ===
The perennial national power Bulldog women's softball team has had a lengthy tradition of winning since the inception of the sport. The Bulldogs have appeared in twelve Women's College World Series in 1982, 1984, 1987, 1988, 1989, 1990, 1991, 1992, 1994, 1997, 1998 and 1999, playing in the title game five times. The softball team owns the distinction of winning the school's first team NCAA national championship in 1998. Fresno State defeated then-top ranked Arizona 1–0 in the 1998 NCAA championship game in Oklahoma City due to the strong arm of All-American pitcher Amanda Scott and the bat of All-American Nina Lindenberg, who scored the game's only run on a solo home run. The Bulldogs finished the season with a 52–11 record and ranked No. 1 in the nation. Arizona entered the 1998 national championship game against Fresno State with a 67–3 overall record.

Through the 2010 season, Fresno State was the nation's only softball team to have earned bids to all 29 NCAA Division I championship tournaments. In addition to Fresno State's 1998 NCAA championship, the Bulldogs reached the NCAA championship game four other times (1982, 1988, 1989, 1990). The Bulldogs were coached by Margie Wright, the nation's winningest Division I coach in the sport, up until 2012, when she retired. Wright, who has led Fresno State to 10 Western Athletic Conference championships in the last 13 years and 18 league crowns overall, finished her 25th season as the head coach Bulldogs in 2010. She entered the 2009 season having won 1,307 games in her career. After Wright, the Bulldogs were coached by Trisha Ford, who previously coached at Stanford. Since Ford had taken the reins, the Bulldogs have had some very strong seasons, including the 2016 season, where the Bulldogs quickly reached 24th in the nation after just their first weekend of play. The Bulldogs are now coached by Linda Garza

The Bulldogs currently have the most women in NCAA history who have sported a sub 1.00 ERA with 7.

=== Tennis ===
Former pro tennis player Cynthia Doerner served as the head coach of the Fresno State Bulldogs women's tennis team for two seasons, from 1987 to 1988.

=== Men's golf ===
The men's golf team has won 13 conference championships:

- Big West Conference (10): 1976, 1979–80, 1983, 1986–91 (co-champion in 1987)
- Western Athletic Conference (3): 1994, 2000, 2003

Their best finish in the NCAA Championship was fifth in 1990.

Bulldogs who have had success at the professional level include: Jerry Heard (five PGA Tour wins), Tim Norris (one PGA Tour win), John Erickson (one PGA Tour Canada win) Kevin Sutherland (one PGA Tour win), and Nick Watney (five PGA Tour wins)

=== Volleyball ===
The Fresno State Bulldogs women's volleyball team have an NCAA Division I Tournament record of 1–4 through four appearances.

Year	Round	Opponent	Result
1984	First round Regional semifinals Regional Finals	UC Santa Barbara; Cal Poly; San Jose State	W 3–1; W 3–2; L 1–3
1991	First round	UC Santa Barbara	L 0–3
1998	First round	Arizona	L 0–3
2002	First round	UC Santa Barbara	L 1–3

=== Wrestling ===
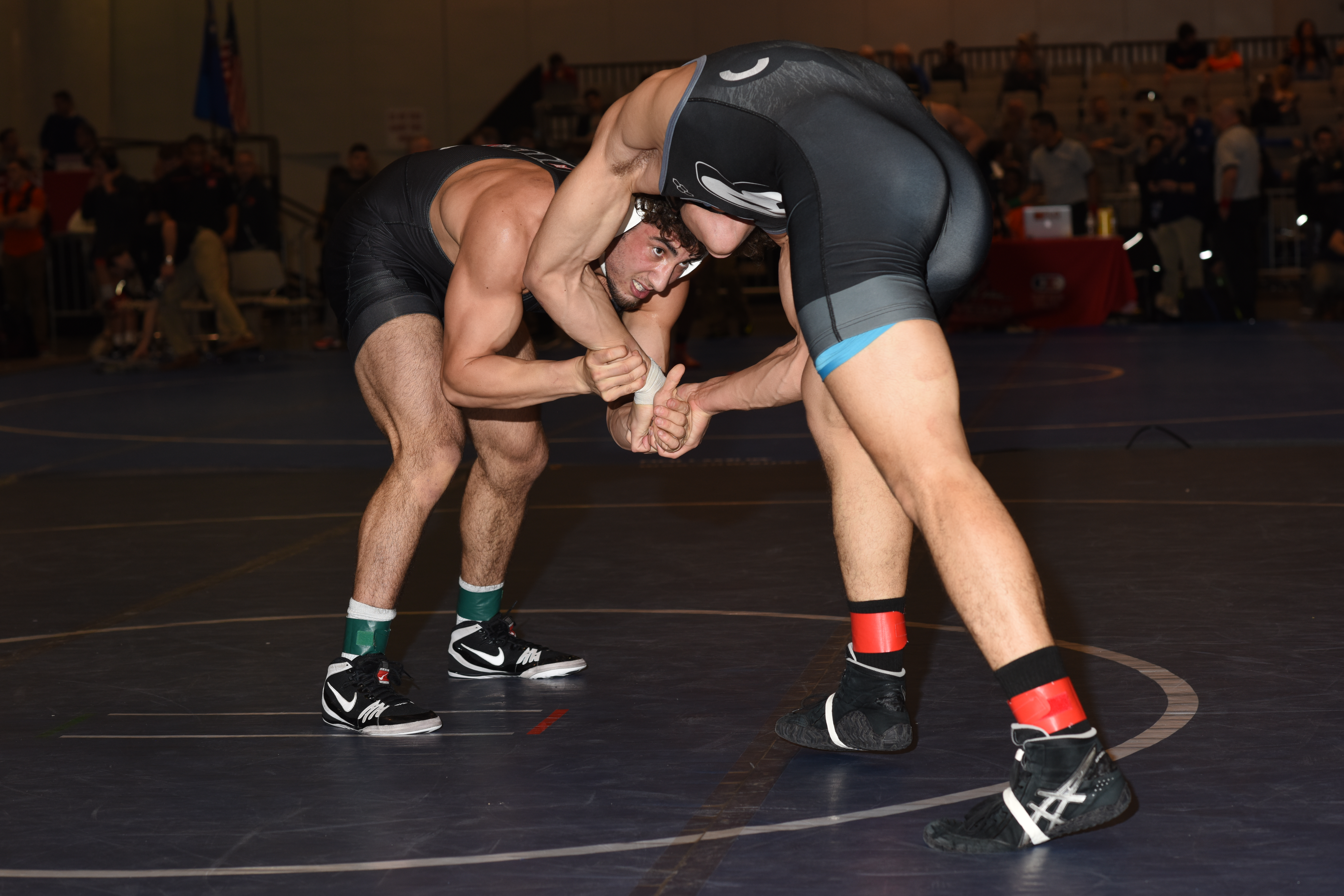
Fresno State wrestling match in 2017

Wrestling was dropped from varsity status in 2006 following a string of lean budget years and gender equity issues. In 2014, University President Joseph Castro pledged to reinstate wrestling, along with the addition of at least one new women's sport. On February 28, 2015, newly appointed athletic director Jim Bartko announced his plan to reinstate wrestling. The process would include fundraising, hiring a coach, and recruiting in a state with only three Division I programs (Stanford, CSU Bakersfield, Cal Poly San Luis Obispo).

To satisfy the Title IX requirement, Fresno State added women's water polo, bringing the total number of Bulldog teams to 22. Both teams started competition in the 2017–18 season. In May 2016, Fresno State named Troy Steiner, who won a national championship with Iowa in 1992, its head coach. In its first season back on the mat, the Bulldogs went 4-16 (1-5 in the Big XII) and had two NCAA qualifiers, finishing T62 out of 72 teams.

The wrestling team was an associate member of the Big 12 Conference, joining Mountain West conference rivals Wyoming and Air Force, since their primary conference does not sponsor wrestling.

In its first iteration, wrestling at Fresno State produced 33 All-Americans and 2004 Olympic silver medalist Stephen Abas. In its second year back, Josh Hokit became an All-American with a fifth-place finish.

The Fresno State Bulldogs men's wrestling team appeared in the NCAA Division I Tournament thirty-four times, with their highest finish being 8th place in the 1992–93 school year.

In response to financial challenges faced by Fresno State, the wrestling program was dropped at the conclusion of the 2020–21 academic year.

Year	Gender	Ranking	Points
1962	Men	No. 40	1
1967	Men	No. 20	13
1968	Men	No. 19	18
1970	Men	No. 55	1
1971	Men	No. 44	1
1972	Men	No. 47	3
1973	Men	No. 56	1
1974	Men	No. 43	2
1977	Men	No. 51	1
1983	Men	No. 32	6 1/2
1984	Men	No. 21	15 3/4
1985	Men	No. 38	6
1986	Men	No. 45	6 1/2
1987	Men	No. 25	13
1988	Men	No. 34	8
1989	Men	No. 30	13
1990	Men	No. 49	3
1991	Men	No. 43	4
1992	Men	No. 25	12
1993	Men	No. 8	37 3/4
1994	Men	No. 11	30
1995	Men	No. 13	32
1996	Men	No. 23	19 1/2
1997	Men	No. 11	35
1998	Men	No. 14	37 1/2
1999	Men	No. 16	34 1/2
2000	Men	No. 47	4 1/2
2001	Men	No. 14	42
2002	Men	No. 19	24
2003	Men	No. 30	15
2004	Men	No. 34	10
2005	Men	No. 50	4 1/2
2006	Men	No. 54	3
2018	Men	No. 62	1/2
2019	Men	No. T29	11 1/2

== Notable non-varsity sports ==
=== Rugby ===
The Fresno State Rugby Football Club was founded in 1971, although rugby was played at the old Fresno State College as early as 1934. In August 2022, Fresno State moved its rugby team from the Division 1 Pacific Western Conference to the California Conference as a Division IAA team. The Bulldogs won their first ever American Collegiate Rugby Div. 1-AA 15's National Championship in 2022, defeating the University of Kansas, 22-17 at Choctaw Stadium in Dallas, Texas. This completed the program's first perfect season in the modern era.

== Championships ==
=== Appearances ===
The Fresno State Bulldogs competed in the NCAA tournament across 17 active sports (9 men's and 8 women's) 297 times at the Division I FBS level.

- Baseball (34): 1954, 1955, 1959, 1961, 1962, 1966, 1967, 1977, 1979, 1980, 1981, 1982, 1983, 1984, 1985, 1988, 1989, 1990, 1991, 1992, 1993, 1994, 1995, 1996, 1997, 2000, 2001, 2006, 2007, 2008, 2009, 2011, 2012, 2019
- Men's basketball (6): 1981, 1982, 1984, 2000, 2001, 2016
- Women's basketball (7): 2008, 2009, 2010, 2011, 2012, 2013, 2014
- Men's cross country (1): 1973
- Football (25): 1944, 1961, 1982, 1985, 1988, 1989, 1991, 1992, 1993, 1999, 2000, 2001, 2002, 2003, 2004, 2005, 2007, 2008, 2009, 2010, 2012, 2013, 2014, 2017, 2018
- Men's golf (21): 1958, 1960, 1964, 1967, 1977, 1979, 1980, 1981, 1983, 1984, 1985, 1986, 1987

• 1989, 1990, 1992, 1993, 1994, 1998, 2000, 2002

- Women's soccer (4): 1999, 2005, 2008, 2010
- Softball (33): 1982, 1983, 1984, 1985, 1986, 1987, 1988, 1989, 1990, 1991, 1992, 1993, 1994, 1995, 1996, 1997, 1998, 1999, 2000, 2001, 2002, 2003, 2004, 2005, 2006, 2007, 2008, 2009, 2010, 2011, 2015, 2016, 2017
- Women's swimming and diving (6): 1996, 1997, 1998, 1999, 2013, 2014
- Men's tennis (14): 1994, 1995, 1996, 1997, 1998, 1999, 2000, 2001, 2003, 2004, 2010, 2011, 2012, 2019
- Women's tennis (17): 1996, 1997, 1998, 1999, 2000, 2001, 2002, 2003, 2004, 2005, 2006, 2007, 2008, 2009, 2011, 2014, 2018
- Men's indoor track and field (16): 1965, 1980, 1981, 1982, 1983, 1986, 1987, 1988, 1990, 1992, 1993, 1994, 1995, 1996, 1998, 1999
- Women's indoor track and field (10): 1985, 1986, 1987, 1988, 1993, 1994, 1996, 1998, 1999, 2009
- Men's outdoor track and field (49): 1934, 1935, 1939, 1940, 1941, 1942, 1943, 1944, 1945, 1947, 1948, 1951, 1952, 1953, 1954, 1955, 1956, 1957, 1958, 1963, 1964, 1965, 1968, 1969, 1972, 1973, 1974, 1977, 1980, 1981, 1982, 1983, 1984, 1985, 1986, 1987, 1988, 1989, 1990, 1991, 1992, 1993, 1994, 1996, 1998, 1999, 2000, 2001, 2008
- Women's outdoor track and field (15): 1983, 1984, 1985, 1986, 1987, 1988, 1990, 1991, 1993, 1996, 1997, 2004, 2007, 2009, 2016
- Women's volleyball (4): 1984, 1991, 1998, 2002
- Wrestling (35): 1962, 1967, 1968, 1970, 1971, 1972, 1973, 1974, 1977, 1983, 1984, 1985, 1986, 1987, 1988, 1989, 1990, 1991, 1992, 1993, 1994, 1995, 1996, 1997, 1998, 1999, 2000, 2001, 2002, 2003, 2004, 2005, 2006, 2018, 2019

=== Team ===
The Bulldogs of Fresno State earned 2 NCAA championships at the Division I level.

- Men's (1)
  - Baseball (1): 2008
- Women's (1)
  - Softball (1): 1998

Results

School year	Sport	Opponent	Score
1997–98	Softball	Arizona	1–0
2007–08	Baseball	Georgia	6–1

Fresno State won 2 national championships at the NCAA Division II level.

- Men's outdoor track and field: 1964
- Men's tennis: 1968

Below are six national club team championships:

- Men's bowling (1): 2011 (USBC)
- Men's judo (2): 1985, 1988 (NCJA)
- Women's judo (3): 1989, 1990, 2024 (NCJA)

=== Individual ===
Fresno State had 19 Bulldogs win NCAA individual championships at the Division I level.

NCAA individual championships
Order	School year	Athlete(s)	Sport	Source
1	1933–34	Walter Marty	Men's outdoor track and field	
2	1934–35	Elroy Robinson	Men's outdoor track and field	
3	1941–42	Art Cazares	Men's outdoor track and field	
4	1952–53	Fred Barnes	Men's outdoor track and field	
5	1956–57	Ancel Robinson	Men's outdoor track and field	
6	1963–64	Charles Craig	Men's outdoor track and field	
7	1967–68	Mike Gallego	Wrestling	
8	1983–84	Matt Mileham	Men's outdoor track and field	
9	1985–86	Doug Fraley	Men's indoor track and field	
10	1986–87	Doug Fraley	Men's indoor track and field	
11	1986–87	Doug Fraley	Men's outdoor track and field	
12	1993–94	Robert Foster	Men's indoor track and field	
13	1993–94	Robert Foster	Men's outdoor track and field	
14	1993–94	Todd Riech	Men's outdoor track and field	
15	1997–98	Melissa Price	Women's indoor track and field	
16	1998–99	Stephen Abas	Wrestling	
17	1998–99	Melissa Price	Women's indoor track and field	
18	2000–01	Stephen Abas	Wrestling	
19	2001–02	Stephen Abas	Wrestling	

At the NCAA Division II level, Fresno State garnered 10 individual championships.

== Sports facilities ==
- Valley Children's Stadium, football
- Save Mart Center, basketball, volleyball, wrestling
- Pete Beiden Field, baseball
- Bulldog Diamond, softball
- Soccer and Lacrosse Field, soccer and women's lacrosse
- Dragonfly Golf Club, golf
- Fresno State Aquatics Center, aquatics
- Student Horse Center, equestrian
- Warmerdam Field, track and field
- Spalding G. Wathen Tennis Center, tennis
- Woodward Park, cross country

== Traditions ==
Red & Blue: When Fresno State was choosing the school colors, the women's teams wanted blue and white while the men's teams wanted red and white; the school decided to choose red and blue (officially, cardinal and navy blue) as a compromise. The Cardinal was in emulation of the colors of Stanford University and the Blue in emulation of the colors of the University of California.

Victor E. Bulldog: The bulldog mascot was chosen when, in 1921, a white bulldog appeared on campus and immediately took to the student body president and his friends. His name is Victor E. The current mascot of Fresno State has the name Victor E. Bulldog III. He was born on March 14, 2015.

V is for Valley: The green "V" featured on Fresno State uniforms is a tribute to the agricultural community of the San Joaquin Valley, the world's richest agricultural area in export dollars in which Fresno is located. The tribute began in 1997 when new football head coach Pat Hill instituted the green V on the back of the helmets (a tradition later adopted by the other programs) as a means of integrating the school and the community.
