= 2003 Fresno State Bulldogs football team =

American college football season

2003 Fresno State Bulldogs football
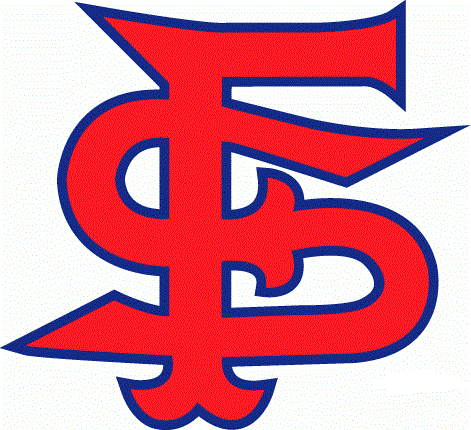

Silicon Valley Football Classic champion

Silicon Valley Football Classic, W 17–9 vs. UCLA
- Conference: Western Athletic Conference
- Record: 9–5 (6–2 WAC)
- Head coach: Pat Hill (7th season)
- Offensive coordinator: Frank Cignetti Jr. (2nd season)
- Offensive scheme: Pro-style
- Defensive coordinator: Dan Brown (3rd season)
- Base defense: 4–3
- Home stadium: Bulldog Stadium

2003 Western Athletic Conference football standings
	Conf.			Overall
Team	W		L	W		L
No. 16 Boise State $	8	–	0	13	–	1
Fresno State	6	–	2	9	–	5
Tulsa	6	–	2	8	–	5
Hawaii	5	–	3	9	–	5
Rice	5	–	3	5	–	7
Nevada	4	–	4	6	–	6
Louisiana Tech	3	–	5	5	–	7
San Jose State	2	–	6	3	–	8
UTEP	1	–	7	2	–	10
SMU	0	–	8	0	–	12
$ – Conference champion; Rankings from AP Poll

The 2003 Fresno State football team represented California State University, Fresno in the 2003 NCAA Division I-A football season, and competed as a member of the Western Athletic Conference. Led by head coach Pat Hill, the Bulldogs played their home games at Bulldog Stadium in Fresno, California.

== Schedule ==
Date	Time	Opponent	Site	TV	Result	Attendance	Source
August 30	12:00 pm	at No. 12 Tennessee*	Neyland Stadium; Knoxville, TN	ESPN2	L 6–24	103,860	
September 5	7:00 pm	Oregon State*	Bulldog Stadium; Fresno, CA	ESPN	W 16–14	35,553	
September 13	12:30 pm	at No. 1 Oklahoma*	Gaylord Family Oklahoma Memorial Stadium; Norman, OK	FSN	L 28–52	83,091	
September 20	7:00 pm	Louisiana Tech	Bulldog Stadium; Fresno, CA	BSN	W 16–6	38,093	
September 27	7:00 pm	Portland State*	Bulldog Stadium; Fresno, CA		W 42–16	39,805	
October 4	12:00 pm	at Colorado State*	Hughes Stadium; Fort Collins, CO	BSN	L 10–34	32,620	
October 11	9:05 pm	at Hawaii	Aloha Stadium; Halawa, HI (rivalry)	BSN	L 28–55	41,153	
October 25	4:00 pm	Rice^{†}	Bulldog Stadium; Fresno, CA		W 31–28	39,462	
November 1	12:00 pm	at SMU	Gerald J. Ford Stadium; Dallas, TX		W 20–11	14,014	
November 8	12:05 pm	at Nevada	Mackay Stadium; Reno, NV	BSN	W 27–10	17,837	
November 15	4:00 pm	San Jose State	Bulldog Stadium; Fresno, CA (rivalry)		W 41–7	39,453	
November 21	6:00 pm	No. 20 Boise State	Bulldog Stadium; Fresno, CA (rivalry)	ESPN2	L 17–31	39,252	
November 29	2:05 pm	at UTEP	Sun Bowl; El Paso, TX	BSN	W 23–20	15,101	
December 30	7:30 pm	vs. UCLA*	Spartan Stadium; San Jose, CA (Silicon Valley Football Classic)	ESPN2	W 17–9	20,126	
*Non-conference game; ^{†}Homecoming; Rankings from AP Poll released prior to the game; All times are in Pacific time

== Game summaries ==
=== At No. 12 Tennessee ===
	1	2	3	4	Total
Bulldogs	0	0	0	6	6
No. 12 Volunteers	7	7	7	3	24

=== Oregon State ===
	1	2	3	4	Total
Beavers	7	0	7	0	14
Bulldogs	0	10	3	3	16

=== At No. 1 Oklahoma ===
	1	2	3	4	Total
Bulldogs	0	0	7	21	28
No. 1 Sooners	16	22	0	14	52

=== Louisiana Tech ===
	1	2	3	4	Total
Bulldogs	3	3	0	0	6
Bulldogs	0	0	10	6	16

=== Portland State ===
	1	2	3	4	Total
Vikings	0	6	3	7	16
Bulldogs	7	7	7	21	42

=== At Colorado State ===
	1	2	3	4	Total
Bulldogs	3	0	7	0	10
Rams	0	10	17	7	34

=== At Hawaii ===
	1	2	3	4	Total
Bulldogs	7	7	7	7	28
Warriors	10	28	7	10	55

=== Rice ===
	1	2	3	4	Total
Owls	7	7	14	0	28
Bulldogs	10	10	0	11	31

=== At SMU ===
	1	2	3	4	Total
Bulldogs	0	3	14	3	20
Mustangs	2	3	0	6	11

=== At Nevada ===
	1	2	3	4	Total
Bulldogs	21	0	3	3	27
Wolf Pack	3	0	0	7	10

=== San Jose State ===
	1	2	3	4	Total
Spartans	0	0	0	7	7
Bulldogs	3	21	7	10	41

=== No. 20 Boise State ===
	1	2	3	4	Total
No. 20 Broncos	14	14	3	0	31
Bulldogs	0	10	0	7	17

=== At UTEP ===
	1	2	3	4	Total
Bulldogs	7	6	7	3	23
Miners	10	10	0	0	20

=== Vs. UCLA (Silicon Valley Classic) ===
	1	2	3	4	Total
Bruins	0	7	2	0	9
Bulldogs	14	3	0	0	17

== Coaching staff ==
Name	Position	Seasons at Fresno State	Alma mater
Pat Hill	Head coach	7th as HC; 13th overall	UC Riverside (1973)
Frank Cignetti Jr.	Offensive coordinator	2nd	Indiana (PA) (1988)
Dan Brown	Defensive coordinator	7th	Boise State (1982)
John Baxter	Associate head coach/special teams/TE	7th	Loras College (1985)
Kerry Locklin	Defensive line	4th	New Mexico State (1982)
Tom Mason	Linebackers	3rd	Eastern Washington (1982)
John Settle	Runningbacks	5th	Appalachian State (1989)
Tim Simons	Wide receivers	4th	Fresno State (1967)
Randy Stewart	Secondary	3rd	Boise State (1980)
Dennis Wagner	Offensive line	6th	Utah (1980)
Cory Undlin	Graduate Assistant	1st	California Lutheran University (1994)
Derek Frazier	Graduate Assistant		
Mike Sholiton	Football Operations Coordinator		
Rich Tucker	Strength and Conditioning Coach		
