= 2002 Fresno State Bulldogs football team =

American college football season

2002 Fresno State Bulldogs football
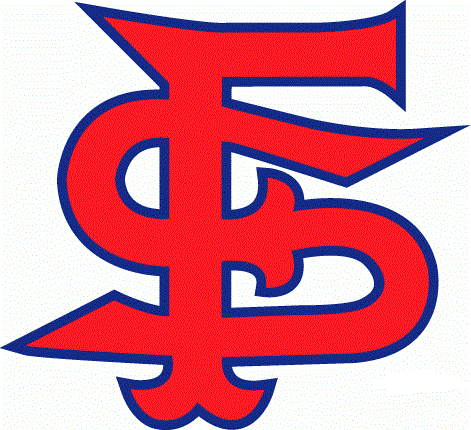

Silicon Valley Football Classic champion

Silicon Valley Football Classic, W 30–21 vs. Georgia Tech
- Conference: Western Athletic Conference
- Record: 9–5 (6–2 WAC)
- Head coach: Pat Hill (6th season)
- Offensive coordinator: Frank Cignetti Jr. (1st season)
- Offensive scheme: Pro-style
- Defensive coordinator: Dan Brown (2nd season)
- Base defense: 4–3
- Home stadium: Bulldog Stadium (Capacity: 41,031)

2002 Western Athletic Conference football standings
	Conf.			Overall
Team	W		L	W		L
No. 15 Boise State $	8	–	0	12	–	1
Hawaii	7	–	1	10	–	4
Fresno State	6	–	2	9	–	5
San Jose State	4	–	4	6	–	7
Nevada	4	–	4	5	–	7
Rice	3	–	5	4	–	7
Louisiana Tech	3	–	5	4	–	8
SMU	3	–	5	3	–	9
UTEP	1	–	7	2	–	10
Tulsa	1	–	7	1	–	11
$ – Conference champion; Rankings from AP Poll

The 2002 Fresno State football team represented California State University, Fresno in the 2002 NCAA Division I-A football season, and competed as a member of the Western Athletic Conference. They played their home games at Bulldog Stadium in Fresno, California and were coached by Pat Hill.

== Schedule ==
Date	Time	Opponent	Site	TV	Result	Attendance
August 23	5:00 pm	at No. 23 Wisconsin*	Camp Randall Stadium; Madison, WI (John Thompson Foundation Classic)	ESPN	L 21–23	75,136
August 29	7:00 pm	San Diego State*	Bulldog Stadium; Fresno, CA (rivalry)	ESPN2	W 16–14	39,111
September 7	12:30 pm	at No. 13 Oregon*	Autzen Stadium; Eugene, OR	FSN	L 24–28	56,357
September 21	3:30 pm	at Oregon State*	Reser Stadium; Corvallis, OR	FSN	L 19–59	36,457
September 28	5:00 pm	at Rice	Rice Stadium; Houston, TX	BSN	W 31–28	18,143
October 4	5:00 pm	No. 22 Colorado State*	Bulldog Stadium; Fresno, CA	ESPN	W 32–30	38,336
October 12	7:30 pm	SMU^{†}	Bulldog Stadium; Fresno, CA	BSN	W 30–7	41,031
October 18	5:05 pm	at Boise State	Bronco Stadium; Boise, ID (Battle for the Milk Can)	ESPN	L 21–67	30,924
October 25	6:00 pm	Hawaii	Bulldog Stadium; Fresno, CA (rivalry)	ESPN2	L 21–31	37,615
November 9	4:00 pm	Tulsa	Bulldog Stadium; Fresno, CA	BSN	W 31–12	37,841
November 16	4:00 pm	Nevada	Bulldog Stadium; Fresno, CA	BSN	W 38–30	40,866
November 23	2:00 pm	at San Jose State	Spartan Stadium; San Jose, CA (rivalry)	BSN	W 19–16	14,134
December 5	4:00 pm	at Louisiana Tech	Joe Aillet Stadium; Ruston, LA	ESPN2	W 45–13	17,810
December 31	12:30 pm	vs. Georgia Tech*	Spartan Stadium; San Jose, CA (Silicon Valley Football Classic)	ESPN2	W 30–21	10,132
*Non-conference game; ^{†}Homecoming; Rankings from AP Poll released prior to the game; All times are in Pacific time

== Game summaries ==
=== At No. 23 Wisconsin ===
	1	2	3	4	Total
Bulldogs					0
No. 23 Badgers					0

=== San Diego State ===
	1	2	3	4	Total
Aztecs					0
Bulldogs					0

=== At No. 13 Oregon ===
	1	2	3	4	Total
Bulldogs					0
No. 13 Ducks					0

=== At Oregon State ===
	1	2	3	4	Total
Bulldogs					0
Beavers					0

=== At Rice ===
	1	2	3	4	Total
Bulldogs					0
Owls					0

=== No. 22 Colorado State ===
	1	2	3	4	Total
No. 22 Rams					0
Bulldogs					0

=== SMU ===
	1	2	3	4	Total
Mustangs					0
Bulldogs					0

=== At Boise State ===
	1	2	3	4	Total
Bulldogs					0
Broncos					0

=== Hawaii ===
	1	2	3	4	Total
Warriors					0
Bulldogs					0

=== Tulsa ===
	1	2	3	4	Total
Golden Hurricane					0
Bulldogs					0

=== Nevada ===
	1	2	3	4	Total
Wolf Pack					0
Bulldogs					0

=== At San Jose State ===
	1	2	3	4	Total
Bulldogs					0
Spartans					0

=== At Louisiana Tech ===
	1	2	3	4	Total
Fresno State Bulldogs					0
LA Tech Bulldogs					0

=== Vs. Georgia Tech (Silicon Valley Classic) ===
	1	2	3	4	Total
Yellow Jackets					0
Bulldogs					0

== Personnel ==
=== Coaching staff ===
Name	Position	Seasons at Fresno State	Alma mater
Pat Hill	Head coach	6th as HC; 12th overall	UC Riverside (1973)
Frank Cignetti Jr.	Offensive coordinator	1st	Indiana (PA) (1988)
Dan Brown	Defensive coordinator	6th	Boise State (1982)
John Baxter	Associate head coach/special teams/TE	6th	Loras College (1985)
Kerry Locklin	Defensive line	3rd	New Mexico State (1982)
Tom Mason	Linebackers	2nd	Eastern Washington (1982)
John Settle	Runningbacks	4th	Appalachian State (1989)
Tim Simons	Wide receivers	3rd	Fresno State (1967)
Randy Stewart	Secondary	2nd	Boise State (1980)
Dennis Wagner	Offensive line	5th	Utah (1980)

=== Roster ===
2002 Fresno State Bulldogs football team roster
Players
Coaches
Offense

Pos.	#	Name	Class
WR	2	Bernard Berrian	Jr
QB	15	Jeff Grady	Jr
WR	5	Adam Jennings	Fr
G	74	Logan Mankins	So
TE	49	Stephen Spach	So

Defense

Pos.	#	Name	Class
LB	35	David Adamo	So
DB	36	Tyrone Culver	Fr
LB	31	Marc Dailey	Jr
DT	93	Clarence Denning	Jr
DB	7	Therrian Fontenot	So
LB	44	Kyle Goodman	Fr
S	23	James Sanders	Fr
DT	91	Jason Stewart	Sr
DE	43	Asa Taylor	So
LB	40	Sam Williams	Sr
DB	24	Cameron Worrell	Sr

Special teams

Pos.	#	Name	Class
K	32	Asen Asparuhov	Jr

Head coach

- Pat Hill

Coordinators/assistant coaches

- Frank Cignetti Jr. (OC)
- Dan Brown (DC)
- Tom Mason (LB)

Legend

- (C) Team captain
- (S) Suspended
- (I) Ineligible
- Injured
- Redshirt
