= 1991 California Bowl =

- Bowl Game
Bowling Green Falcons	Fresno State Bulldogs
(10-1)	(10–1)
28	21
Head coach: Gary Blackney	Head coach: Jim Sweeney
	1	2	3	4	Total
Bowling Green	14	7	0	7	28
Fresno State	7	7	0	7	21
- Date: December 14, 1991
- Season: 1991
- Stadium: Bulldog Stadium
- Location: Fresno, California
- Attendance: 34,877

The 1991 California Bowl was an American college football bowl game played on December 14, 1991 at Bulldog Stadium in Fresno, California. The game pitted the Fresno State Bulldogs and the Bowling Green Falcons.

== Background ==
After five seasons that had ranged from mediocre to abysmal, the Falcons replaced Moe Ankney with Gary Blackney, an assistant coach from Ohio State. He began his tenure with a 17-6 win over Eastern Michigan and a 24-17 loss to West Virginia. After that, the Falcons did not lose another game for the rest of the season, winning all eight of their MAC games to win the Mid-American Conference for the first time since 1985. This was their third bowl game in school history, and it was yet another game versus Fresno State, who had beaten them twice in 1982 and 1985. The Bulldogs began the season with seven straight victories, rising to #25 in the polls before a 20-19 loss to Utah State. Fresno State finished strong, winning their last three games (over Pacific, Cal State Fullerton, and San Jose State) to clinch a share of the Big West Conference title, with an identical conference record (6-1) to San Jose State, though the Bulldogs would be the one given an invite to the California Bowl for the fifth time (1982, 1985, 1988, and 1989) in ten years.

== Game summary ==
- Bowling Green - Brett Landman 5 yard touchdown pass from LeRoy Smith (Leaver kick), 9:01, 1st qtr.
- Bowling Green - Mark Szlachcic 29 yard touchdown pass from Erik White (Leaver kick), 7:19, 1st qtr.
- Fresno State - Mark Barsotti 3 yard touchdown run (Mahoney kick), 2:27, 1st qtr.
- Bowling Green - Mark Szlachcic 9 yard touchdown pass from Erik White (Leaver kick), 12:39, 2nd qtr.
- Fresno State - Anthony Daigle 57 yard touchdown run (Mahoney kick), 11:17, 2nd qtr.
- Bowling Green - LeRoy Smith 1 yard touchdown run (Leaver kick), 13:15, 4th qtr.
- Fresno State - Marty Thompson 5 yard touchdown pass from Mark Barsotti (Mahoney kick), 9:11, 4th qtr.

The 14 point underdog Falcons were outrushed and outpassed, but the Falcons jumped out to a 14-0 lead after two touchdowns on the first two possessions. The teams traded touchdowns before going into the half, with the Falcons up 21-14. The second half started with defense, with the third quarter having just 65 yards gained on both sides and 0 points. Derek Mahoney attempted a 26-yard field goal in the third quarter, but the kick fell short. The Falcons took advantage of the miss, driving 80 yards while scoring early in the fourth quarter. The Falcons scored what turned out to be the winning points on a Smith touchdown run, though the Bulldogs clawed back on a Barsotti touchdown pass. There were three changes of possession for the rest of the game, with the last proving to be the most crucial.

With 2:29 remaining, Fresno State got the ball back on a Tony Brown interception on the Falcon 1-yard line. The Bulldogs managed to drive the ball all the way to the nine yard line of the Bulldogs, who called their last time out with :24 remaining. A running play gained six yards, making it just three more yards for the potential tying touchdown. Two incomplete passes from Barsotti set up a pivotal fourth and goal with three seconds remaining. On the final play, Barsotti's pass fell incomplete to his covered receivers, as the Falcons completed the upset. The Bulldogs had 24 first downs, 198 rushing yards (on 42 carries), 286 passing yards, three turnovers, and had the ball for 29:14. The Falcons had 22 first downs, 115 rushing yards (on 39 carries), 268 passing yards, two turnovers, and had the ball for 30:46. Blackney was the third coach to ever win 11 games in his first season as coach.

== Aftermath ==
This was the final California Bowl played, due to NCAA certification being lost. The game would move to Las Vegas, Nevada, keeping the tie-ins to the Big West and the MAC while being christened as the Las Vegas Bowl. The Bulldogs joined the Western Athletic Conference in 1992. The Bulldogs won the WAC title in their first two seasons, winning the Freedom Bowl and losing the Aloha Bowl. However, Sweeney's last three season were all losing seasons (the first since 1978-81). The Bulldogs rebounded in 1999 with a WAC title under Sweeney's successor, Pat Hill. Incidentally, his first bowl game was in the successor to this bowl game, the Las Vegas Bowl.
