= 1991 Utah Utes football team =

American college football season

1991 Utah Utes football
- Conference: Western Athletic Conference
- Record: 7–5 (4–4 WAC)
- Head coach: Ron McBride (2nd season)
- Offensive coordinator: Rick Rasnick (1st season)
- Offensive scheme: Multiple
- Defensive coordinator: Greg McMackin (2nd season)
- Base defense: 4–3
- Home stadium: Robert Rice Stadium

1991 Western Athletic Conference football standings
	Conf.					Overall
Team	W		L		T	W		L		T
No. 23 BYU $	7	–	0	–	1	8	–	3	–	2
San Diego State	6	–	1	–	1	8	–	4	–	1
No. 25 Air Force	6	–	2	–	0	10	–	3	–	0
Utah	4	–	4	–	0	7	–	5	–	0
Hawaii	3	–	5	–	0	4	–	7	–	1
Wyoming	2	–	5	–	1	4	–	6	–	1
UTEP	2	–	5	–	1	4	–	7	–	1
Colorado State	2	–	6	–	0	3	–	8	–	0
New Mexico	2	–	6	–	0	2	–	9	–	0
$ – Conference champion; Rankings from AP Poll

The 1991 Utah Utes football team represented the University of Utah as a member of the Western Athletic Conference (WAC) during the 1991 NCAA Division I-A football season. In their second season under head coach Ron McBride, the Utes compiled an overall record of 7–5 record with a mark of 4–4 against conference opponents, placed fourth in the WAC, and were outscored by their opponents 277 to 276. The team played home games at Robert Rice Stadium in Salt Lake City.

== Schedule ==
Date	Time	Opponent	Site	TV	Result	Attendance	Source
August 31	7:00 pm	Utah State*	Robert Rice Stadium; Salt Lake City, UT (Battle of the Brothers)		W 12–7	27,570	
September 7	2:00 pm	at Oregon State*	Parker Stadium; Corvallis, OR		W 22–10	25,812	
September 14	7:00 pm	Air Force	Robert Rice Stadium; Salt Lake City, UT		L 21–24	28,619	
September 21	7:00 pm	Oregon*	Robert Rice Stadium; Salt Lake City, UT		W 24–17	27,867	
October 5	8:00 pm	at Arizona State*	Sun Devil Stadium; Tempe, AZ		L 15–21	44,324	
October 12	1:00 pm	at Wyoming	War Memorial Stadium; Laramie, WY		W 57–42	20,709	
October 19	12:00 pm	Colorado State	Robert Rice Stadium; Salt Lake City, UT		W 21–16	26,180	
October 26	7:00 pm	San Diego State^{†}	Robert Rice Stadium; Salt Lake City, UT		L 21–24	25,657	
November 2	10:00 pm	at Hawaii	Aloha Stadium; Halawa, HI	KUTV	L 26–52	42,781	
November 9	7:00 pm	New Mexico	Robert Rice Stadium; Salt Lake City, UT		W 30–7	21,619	
November 16	7:05 pm	at UTEP	Sun Bowl; El Paso, TX		W 10–9	23,952	
November 23	12:00 pm	at BYU	Cougar Stadium; Provo, UT (Holy War)		L 17–48	66,003	
*Non-conference game; ^{†}Homecoming; All times are in Mountain time; Source:

== Roster ==
1991 Utah Utes football team roster
Players
Coaches
Offense

Pos.	#	Name	Class
TE	82	Kurt Haws	Jr
C	56	Lance Scott	Fr

Defense

Pos.	#	Name	Class
LB	43	Anthony Davis	Sr
DE	95	Keith Embray	Sr

Special teams

Pos.	#	Name	Class
K	11	Chris Yergensen	So

Head coach

- Ron McBride

Coordinators/assistant coaches

Legend

- (C) Team captain
- (S) Suspended
- (I) Ineligible
- Injured
- Redshirt

== NFL draft ==
One Utah layer was selected in the 1992 NFL draft.

Player	Position	Round	Pick	NFL team
Anthony Davis	Linebacker	11	301	Houston Oilers
