= Timeout (mascot) =

Mascot of a sports team in America

Timeout is the official mascot at the Fresno State Bulldogs in Fresno, California, United States.

== Origins as live mascot ==
Fresno State adopted the Bulldog mascot in 1921, ten years after its founding as the Fresno Normal School. That year, which was also the first year of Football for the school, student body president Warren Moody and friends were continually greeted outside the main campus building by a white bulldog. The live dog was adopted by the student body and brought to football games as the mascot.

== Transition to costumed mascot ==
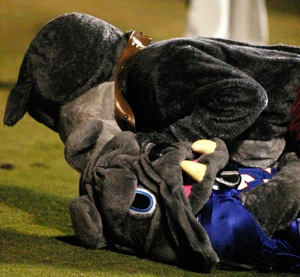
Timeout pounces on Champ

A live dog was brought to football games as the mascot for several decades, until the 1980s when the Bulldogs moved into a bigger stadium and became more successful. A costumed Bulldog was introduced in 1981, and was created by a student named Gary Johns. While Timeout has become a costumed mascot, there are still live bulldogs brought to the game. The costumed mascot, like those at other universities, has become a staple of the football experience, and will occasionally mock-fight the other mascot. A particularly memorable instance occurs when Fresno State plays the conference rival Louisiana Tech Bulldogs in the annual Battle for the Bone.

In addition to being a costumed mascot, Timeout is also featured in other ways by the athletic department in promotions and contests. Timeout has been made into a bobblehead figure, sold in the Bulldog Shop on the campus of the university and provided in other promotions. Timeout is also used by the University as the information search engine for new students, in the feature "Ask Timeout".

== Controversy ==
A controversy arose in the 2007 season when the athletic department made a sudden change to the look of the mascot that proved unpopular with many fans. The original Timeout was a gray color, with large jowls and snout, a small mouth with a harmless, protruding tongue. This was replaced by a brown colored 'bulldog' with a large, open mouth with many teeth, and less of a jowly snout. Many people complained that the new timeout looks less like a bulldog and more akin to a cat or cougar. Some people even protested, and one fan attended the games wearing a former timeout's costume. This caused the university to rethink the decision and allowed fans to make a vote between the newer design and the previous design. The previous design won, although it has been slightly altered it is more like the old mascot and most fans are now content with the costume. The costume was brought back at the start of the 2008 football season
