= 1991 BYU Cougars football team =

American college football season

1991 BYU Cougars football

WAC champion

Holiday Bowl, T 13–13 vs. Iowa
- Conference: Western Athletic Conference

Ranking
- Coaches: No. 23
- AP: No. 23
- Record: 8–3–2 (7–0–1 WAC)
- Head coach: LaVell Edwards (20th season)
- Offensive coordinator: Roger French (11th season)
- Offensive scheme: West Coast
- Defensive coordinator: Ken Schmidt (1st season)
- Base defense: 4–3
- Home stadium: Cougar Stadium

1991 Western Athletic Conference football standings
| | Conf. | | | | | Overall |
| Team | W | | L | | T | W | | L | | T |
|---|---|---|---|---|---|---|---|---|---|---|
| No. 23 BYU $ | 7 | – | 0 | – | 1 | 8 | – | 3 | – | 2 |
| San Diego State | 6 | – | 1 | – | 1 | 8 | – | 4 | – | 1 |
| No. 25 Air Force | 6 | – | 2 | – | 0 | 10 | – | 3 | – | 0 |
| Utah | 4 | – | 4 | – | 0 | 7 | – | 5 | – | 0 |
| Hawaii | 3 | – | 5 | – | 0 | 4 | – | 7 | – | 1 |
| Wyoming | 2 | – | 5 | – | 1 | 4 | – | 6 | – | 1 |
| UTEP | 2 | – | 5 | – | 1 | 4 | – | 7 | – | 1 |
| Colorado State | 2 | – | 6 | – | 0 | 3 | – | 8 | – | 0 |
| New Mexico | 2 | – | 6 | – | 0 | 2 | – | 9 | – | 0 |
$ – Conference champion; Rankings from AP Poll

The 1991 BYU Cougars football team represented Brigham Young University as a member of the Western Athletic Conference (WAC) during the 1991 NCAA Division I-A football season. Led by 20th-year head coach LaVell Edwards, the Cougars compiled a record of 8–3–2 overall and 7–0–1 in conference play, winning the WAC title for the third consecutive season. BYU was invited to the Holiday Bowl, where the Cougars tied Iowa.

== Schedule ==
| Date | Opponent | Rank | Site | TV | Result | Attendance | Source |
|---|---|---|---|---|---|---|---|
| August 29 | vs. No. 1 Florida State* | No. 19 | Anaheim Stadium; Anaheim, CA (Pigskin Classic) | Raycom | L 28–44 | 38,363 | |
| September 7 | at No. 23 UCLA* | No. 25 | Rose Bowl; Pasadena, CA | | L 23–27 | 61,542 | |
| September 21 | at No. 12 Penn State* | | Beaver Stadium; University Park, PA | ABC | L 7–33 | 96,304 | |
| September 28 | Air Force | | Cougar Stadium; Provo, UT | | W 21–7 | 65,899 | |
| October 4 | Utah State* | | Cougar Stadium; Provo, UT | | W 38–12 | 65,814 | |
| October 12 | UTEP | | Cougar Stadium; Provo, UT | | W 31–29 | 65,803 | |
| October 19 | Hawaii | | Cougar Stadium; Provo, UT | | W 35–18 | 65,866 | |
| October 26 | at New Mexico | | University Stadium; Albuquerque, NM | | W 41–23 | 15,902 | |
| October 31 | at Colorado State | | Hughes Stadium; Fort Collins, CO | ESPN | W 40–17 | 25,203 | |
| November 9 | Wyoming | | Cougar Stadium; Provo, UT | | W 56–31 | 65,593 | |
| November 16 | at San Diego State | No. 23 | Jack Murphy Stadium; San Diego, CA | ESPN | T 52–52 | 56,737 | |
| November 23 | Utah | | Cougar Stadium; Provo, UT (Holy War) | | W 48–17 | 66,003 | |
| December 30 | vs. No. 7 Iowa* | | Jack Murphy Stadium; San Diego, CA (Holiday Bowl) | ESPN | T 13–13 | 60,646 | |
*Non-conference game; Rankings from AP Poll released prior to the game; Source:

== Game summaries ==
=== Iowa (Holiday Bowl) ===
#7 Iowa vs. BYU

| Team | 1 | 2 | 3 | 4 | Total |
|---|---|---|---|---|---|
| Hawkeyes | 6 | 7 | 0 | 0 | 13 |
| Cougars | 0 | 6 | 0 | 7 | 13 |

- Date: December 30
- Location: Jack Murphy Stadium, San Diego, California
- Game attendance: 60,646
- TV announcers (ESPN): Steve Physioc and Gary Danielson

Scoring summary
| 1 | | Iowa | Mike Saunders 13-yard run (extra point missed) | Iowa 6–0 |
| 2 | | Iowa | Mike Saunders 5-yard run (Skillett kick) | Iowa 13–0 |
| 2 | | BYU | Tuipulotu 9-yard pass from Ty Detmer (extra point missed) | Iowa 13–6 |
| 4 | 11:36 | BYU | Tyler Anderson 29-pass from Ty Detmer (Kauffman kick) | Tied 13–13 |

== Roster ==
1991 BYU Cougars football team roster
Players
Coaches
Offense

| Pos. | # | Name | Class |
|---|---|---|---|
| OT | 57 | John Ashman | Sr |
| OT | 71 | Scott Brumfield | Jr |
| RB | 43 | Scott Charlton | Sr |
| QB | 14 | Ty Detmer | Sr |
| OT | 63 | Kent Griffith | Sr |
| C | 79 | Mike Jenkins | Sr |
| WR | 87 | Micah Matsuzaki | Jr |
| WR | 42 | Tim Nowatzke | Fr |
| G | 68 | Mao Pili | Sr |
| TE | 89 | Matt Zundel | Sr |

Defense

| Pos. | # | Name | Class |
|---|---|---|---|
| DB | 20 | Josh Arnold | Sr |
| LB | 45 | Rocky Biegel | Sr |
| DB | 5 | Derwin Gray | Jr |
| DT | 98 | Brad Hunter | Jr |
| DT | 94 | Chad Moffat | Sr |
| DT | 99 | Greg Pitts | Fr |
| DB | 22 | Paul Pitts | Sr |
| LB | 48 | Kendall Purcell | Sr |

Special teams

| Pos. | # | Name | Class |

Head coach

- LaVell Edwards

Coordinators/assistant coaches

- Robert Anae
  (Graduate assistant)

Legend

- (C) Team captain
- (S) Suspended
- (I) Ineligible
- Injured
- Redshirt

Roster

== Awards and honors ==
- Ty Detmer: Davey O'Brien Award, Consensus First-team All-American, 3rd in Heisman Trophy voting

== 1992 NFL draft ==
| Round | Pick | Player | Position | NFL team |
|---|---|---|---|---|
| 9 | 230 | Ty Detmer | Quarterback | Green Bay Packers |
