= 1991 Utah State Aggies football team =

American college football season

1991 Utah State Aggies football
- Conference: Big West Conference
- Record: 5–6 (5–2 Big West)
- Head coach: Chuck Shelton (6th season)
- Offensive coordinator: Pat Behrns (3rd season)
- Defensive coordinator: Fred Bleil (6th season)
- Home stadium: Romney Stadium

1991 Big West Conference football standings
	Conf.					Overall
Team	W		L		T	W		L		T
Fresno State +	6	–	1	–	0	10	–	2	–	0
San Jose State +	6	–	1	–	0	6	–	4	–	1
Utah State	5	–	2	–	0	5	–	6	–	0
Pacific (CA)	4	–	3	–	0	5	–	7	–	0
UNLV	2	–	5	–	0	4	–	7	–	0
Long Beach State	2	–	5	–	0	2	–	9	–	0
New Mexico State	2	–	5	–	0	2	–	9	–	0
Cal State Fullerton	1	–	6	–	0	2	–	9	–	0
+ – Conference co-champions

The 1991 Utah State Aggies football team represented Utah State University during the 1991 NCAA Division I-A football season as a member of the Big West Conference. The Aggies were led by head coach Chuck Shelton in his sixth and final year at Utah State and played their home games at Romney Stadium in Logan, Utah. The Aggies finished the season with an overall of record of 5–6, placing third in the Big West with a mark of 5–2.

== Schedule ==
Date	Opponent	Site	Result	Attendance	Source
August 31	at Utah*	Robert Rice Stadium; Salt Lake City, UT (Battle of the Brothers, Beehive Boot)	L 7–12	27,570	
September 7	at No. 14 Nebraska*	Memorial Stadium; Lincoln, NE	L 28–59	76,115	
September 21	at No. 7 Oklahoma*	Oklahoma Memorial Stadium; Norman, OK	L 21–55	69,057	
September 28	San Jose State	Romney Stadium; Logan, UT	L 7–23	12,353	
October 4	at BYU*	Cougar Stadium; Provo, UT (rivalry, Beehive Boot)	L 10–38	65,814	
October 19	Cal State Fullerton	Romney Stadium; Logan, UT	W 26–3	8,957	
October 26	at Long Beach State	Veterans Stadium; Long Beach, CA	L 6–7	4,337	
November 2	No. 25 Fresno State	Romney Stadium; Logan, UT	W 20–19	9,814	
November 9	at UNLV	Sam Boyd Silver Bowl; Whitney, NV	W 27–14	11,787	
November 16	Pacific (CA)	Romney Stadium; Logan, UT	W 21-14	8,217	
November 23	at New Mexico State	Aggie Memorial Stadium; Las Cruces, NM	W 46–21	9,180	
*Non-conference game; Rankings from AP Poll released prior to the game; Source:
