= 1991 San Diego State Aztecs football team =

American college football season

1991 San Diego State Aztecs football

Freedom Bowl, L 17–28 vs. Tulsa
- Conference: Western Athletic Conference
- Record: 8–4–1 (6–1–1 WAC)
- Head coach: Al Luginbill (3rd season)
- Offensive coordinator: Dave Lay (3rd season)
- Offensive scheme: Single set back
- Defensive coordinator: Barry Lamb (3rd season)
- Base defense: 4–3
- Home stadium: Jack Murphy Stadium

1991 Western Athletic Conference football standings
	Conf.					Overall
Team	W		L		T	W		L		T
No. 23 BYU $	7	–	0	–	1	8	–	3	–	2
San Diego State	6	–	1	–	1	8	–	4	–	1
No. 25 Air Force	6	–	2	–	0	10	–	3	–	0
Utah	4	–	4	–	0	7	–	5	–	0
Hawaii	3	–	5	–	0	4	–	7	–	1
Wyoming	2	–	5	–	1	4	–	6	–	1
UTEP	2	–	5	–	1	4	–	7	–	1
Colorado State	2	–	6	–	0	3	–	8	–	0
New Mexico	2	–	6	–	0	2	–	9	–	0
$ – Conference champion; Rankings from AP Poll

The 1991 San Diego State Aztecs football team represented San Diego State University as a member of the Western Athletic Conference (WAC) during the 1991 NCAA Division I-A football season. Led by third-year head coach Al Luginbill, the Aztecs compiled an overall record of 8–4–1 with a mark of 6–1–1 conference play, placing second in the WAC. San Diego State was invited to the Freedom Bowl, where the Aztecs lost to Tulsa. The team played home games at Jack Murphy Stadium in San Diego.

== Schedule ==
Date	Opponent	Site	TV	Result	Attendance	Source
September 8	Long Beach State*	Jack Murphy Stadium; San Diego, CA	Prime	W 49–13	26,749	
September 14	Pacific (CA)*	Jack Murphy Stadium; San Diego, CA	Prime	W 55–34	24,408	
September 21	at Air Force	Falcon Stadium; Colorado Springs, CO	Prime	L 20–21	43,011	
September 26	UCLA*	Jack Murphy Stadium; San Diego, CA	ESPN	L 12–37	37,333	
October 5	at Hawaii	Aloha Stadium; Halawa, HI	Prime	W 47–21	38,259	
October 12	New Mexico	Jack Murphy Stadium; San Diego, CA	Prime	W 38–24	21,338	
October 19	at UTEP	Sun Bowl; El Paso, TX	Prime	W 28–21	25,342	
October 26	at Utah	Robert Rice Stadium; Salt Lake City, UT	ABC	W 24–21	25,657	
November 2	Wyoming^{†}	Jack Murphy Stadium; San Diego, CA	Prime	W 24–22	35,961	
November 9	Colorado State	Jack Murphy Stadium; San Diego, CA	Prime	W 42–32	30,163	
November 16	BYU*	Jack Murphy Stadium; San Diego, CA	ESPN	T 52–52	56,737	
November 30	at No. 1 Miami (FL)*	Miami Orange Bowl; Miami, FL	ESPN	L 12–39	56,721	
December 30	vs. No. 23 Tulsa*	Anaheim Stadium; Anaheim, CA (Freedom Bowl)	Raycom	L 17–28	34,217	
*Non-conference game; ^{†}Homecoming; Rankings from AP Poll released prior to the game; Source:

== Team players in the NFL ==
The following were selected in the 1992 NFL draft.

Player	Position	Round	Overall	NFL team
Patrick Rowe	Wide Receiver	2	52	Cleveland Browns
Ray Rowe	Tight End	6	168	Washington Redskins
Jim Jennings	Guard	8	213	Kansas City Chiefs

== Team awards ==
Award	Player
Most Valuable Player (John Simcox Memorial Trophy)	David Lowery
Outstanding Offensive & Defensive Linemen (Byron H. Chase Memorial Trophy)	Kevin Macon, Off; Eric Duncan, Def
Team captains Dr. R. Hardy / C.E. Peterson Memorial Trophy	Jim Jennings, Off; Lou Foster, Def; Zack Stokes, Special Teams
Most Inspirational Player	Lou Foster
