= 1991 San Jose State Spartans football team =

American college football season

1991 San Jose State Spartans football

Big West co-champion
- Conference: Big West Conference
- Record: 6–4–1 (6–1 Big West)
- Head coach: Terry Shea (2nd season)
- Home stadium: Spartan Stadium

1991 Big West Conference football standings
	Conf.					Overall
Team	W		L		T	W		L		T
Fresno State +	6	–	1	–	0	10	–	2	–	0
San Jose State +	6	–	1	–	0	6	–	4	–	1
Utah State	5	–	2	–	0	5	–	6	–	0
Pacific (CA)	4	–	3	–	0	5	–	7	–	0
UNLV	2	–	5	–	0	4	–	7	–	0
Long Beach State	2	–	5	–	0	2	–	9	–	0
New Mexico State	2	–	5	–	0	2	–	9	–	0
Cal State Fullerton	1	–	6	–	0	2	–	9	–	0
+ – Conference co-champions

The 1991 San Jose State Spartans football team represented San Jose State University during the 1991 NCAA Division I-A football season as a member of the Big West Conference. The team was led by head coach Terry Shea, in his second year as head coach at San Jose State. They played home games at Spartan Stadium in San Jose, California. The Spartans finished the 1991 season as co-champions of the Big West conference, with a record of six wins, four losses and one tie (6–4–1, 6–1 Big West). This was their last conference title until 2020.

== Schedule ==
Date	Opponent	Site	Result	Attendance	Source
September 7	at No. 6 Florida*	Ben Hill Griffin Stadium; Gainesville, FL	L 21–59	83,067	
September 14	at Minnesota*	Hubert H. Humphrey Metrodome; Minneapolis, MN	L 20–26	47,914	
September 21	at Long Beach State	Veterans Stadium; Long Beach, CA	W 32–20	4,329	
September 28	at Utah State	Romney Stadium; Logan, UT	W 23–7	12,353	
October 12	at New Mexico State	Aggie Memorial Stadium; Las Cruces, NM	W 39–13	10,754	
October 19	Pacific (CA)	Spartan Stadium; San Jose, CA (Victory Bell)	W 64–47	16,238	
October 26	at No. 10 California*	California Memorial Stadium; Berkeley CA	L 20–41	33,000	
November 2	UNLV^{†}	Spartan Stadium; San Jose, CA	W 55–12	16,524	
November 9	Cal State Fullerton	Spartan Stadium; San Jose, CA	W 35–7	10,112	
November 16	Hawaii	Spartan Stadium; San Jose, CA (rivalry)	T 35–35	20,289	
November 23	at Fresno State	Bulldog Stadium; Fresno, CA (rivalry)	L 28–31	40,513	
*Non-conference game; ^{†}Homecoming; Rankings from AP Poll released prior to the game; Source:
