= 1991 New Mexico Lobos football team =

American college football season

1991 New Mexico Lobos football
- Conference: Western Athletic Conference
- Record: 3–9 (2–6 WAC)
- Head coach: Mike Sheppard (5th season)
- Offensive coordinator: Jan Quarless (2nd season)
- Defensive coordinator: Dan Brown (1st season)
- Home stadium: University Stadium

1991 Western Athletic Conference football standings
| | Conf. | | | | | Overall |
| Team | W | | L | | T | W | | L | | T |
|---|---|---|---|---|---|---|---|---|---|---|
| No. 23 BYU $ | 7 | – | 0 | – | 1 | 8 | – | 3 | – | 2 |
| San Diego State | 6 | – | 1 | – | 1 | 8 | – | 4 | – | 1 |
| No. 25 Air Force | 6 | – | 2 | – | 0 | 10 | – | 3 | – | 0 |
| Utah | 4 | – | 4 | – | 0 | 7 | – | 5 | – | 0 |
| Hawaii | 3 | – | 5 | – | 0 | 4 | – | 7 | – | 1 |
| Wyoming | 2 | – | 5 | – | 1 | 4 | – | 6 | – | 1 |
| UTEP | 2 | – | 5 | – | 1 | 4 | – | 7 | – | 1 |
| Colorado State | 2 | – | 6 | – | 0 | 3 | – | 8 | – | 0 |
| New Mexico | 2 | – | 6 | – | 0 | 2 | – | 9 | – | 0 |
$ – Conference champion; Rankings from AP Poll

The 1991 New Mexico Lobos football team was an American football team that represented the University of New Mexico in the Western Athletic Conference (WAC) during the 1991 NCAA Division I-A football season. In their fifth and final season under head coach Mike Sheppard, the Lobos compiled a 3–9 record (2–6 against WAC opponents) and were outscored by a total of 473 to 240.

The team's statistical leaders included Stoney Case with 1,564 passing yards, Marc Wilson with 245 rushing yards, Carl Winston with 1,177 receiving yards, and kicker David Margolis with 50 points scored.

== Schedule ==
| Date | Opponent | Site | Result | Attendance | Source |
|---|---|---|---|---|---|
| August 31 | at UTEP | Sun Bowl; El Paso, TX | L 19–35 | 40,319 | |
| September 7 | at TCU* | Amon G. Carter Stadium; Fort Worth, TX | L 7–60 | 21,112 | |
| September 14 | at Hawaii | Aloha Stadium; Halawa, HI | L 13–35 | 43,300 | |
| September 21 | UNLV* | University Stadium; Albuquerque, NM | L 22–23 | 16,679 | |
| September 28 | New Mexico State*^{†} | University Stadium; Albuquerque, NM (rivalry) | W 17–10 | 22,441 | |
| October 5 | at Fresno State* | Bulldog Stadium; Fresno, CA | L 17–94 | 33,739 | |
| October 12 | at San Diego State | Jack Murphy Stadium; San Diego, CA | L 24–38 | 21,338 | |
| October 19 | Wyoming | University Stadium; Albuquerque, NM | L 19–39 | 12,500 | |
| October 26 | BYU | University Stadium; Albuquerque, NM | L 23–41 | 15,902 | |
| November 2 | Air Force | University Stadium; Albuquerque, NM | W 34–32 | 10,793 | |
| November 9 | at Utah | Robert Rice Stadium; Salt Lake City, UT | L 7–30 | 21,619 | |
| November 16 | at Colorado State | Hughes Stadium; Fort Collins, CO | W 38–36 | 10,171 | |
*Non-conference game; ^{†}Homecoming
