= 1991 UTEP Miners football team =

American college football season

1991 UTEP Miners football
- Conference: Western Athletic Conference
- Record: 4–7–1 (2–5–1 WAC)
- Head coach: David Lee (3rd season)
- Offensive coordinator: Johnnie Mac Hollinger (1st season)
- Defensive coordinator: Charlie Bailey (2nd season)
- Home stadium: Sun Bowl

1991 Western Athletic Conference football standings
	Conf.					Overall
Team	W		L		T	W		L		T
No. 23 BYU $	7	–	0	–	1	8	–	3	–	2
San Diego State	6	–	1	–	1	8	–	4	–	1
No. 25 Air Force	6	–	2	–	0	10	–	3	–	0
Utah	4	–	4	–	0	7	–	5	–	0
Hawaii	3	–	5	–	0	4	–	7	–	1
Wyoming	2	–	5	–	1	4	–	6	–	1
UTEP	2	–	5	–	1	4	–	7	–	1
Colorado State	2	–	6	–	0	3	–	8	–	0
New Mexico	2	–	6	–	0	2	–	9	–	0
$ – Conference champion; Rankings from AP Poll

The 1991 UTEP Miners football team was an American football team that represented the University of Texas at El Paso in the Western Athletic Conference during the 1991 NCAA Division I-A football season. In their third year under head coach David Lee, the team compiled a 4–7–1 record.

== Schedule ==
Date	Opponent	Site	Result	Attendance	Source
August 31	New Mexico	Sun Bowl; El Paso, TX	W 35–19	40,319	
September 7	at Baylor*	Floyd Casey Stadium; Waco, TX	L 7–27	35,127	
September 14	at New Mexico State*	Aggie Memorial Stadium; Las Cruces, NM (rivalry)	W 22–21	30,341	
September 21	Northwestern State*	Sun Bowl; El Paso, TX	W 14–0	30,655	
September 28	at Wyoming	War Memorial Stadium; Laramie, WY	T 28–28	16,135	
October 5	Colorado State^{†}	Sun Bowl; El Paso, TX	L 18–23	39,764	
October 12	at BYU	Cougar Stadium; Provo, UT	L 29–31	65,803	
October 19	San Diego State	Sun Bowl; El Paso, TX	L 21–28	25,342	
October 26	at Air Force	Falcon Stadium; Colorado Springs, CO	L 13–20	38,975	
November 9	at Hawaii	Aloha Stadium; Halawa, HI	W 41–24	33,824	
November 16	Utah	Sun Bowl; El Paso, TX	L 9–10	23,952	
November 23	Louisiana Tech*	Sun Bowl; El Paso, TX	L 17–21	16,123	
*Non-conference game; ^{†}Homecoming
