= 1991 New Mexico State Aggies football team =

American college football season

1991 New Mexico State Aggies football
- Conference: Big West Conference
- Record: 2–9 (2–5 Big West)
- Head coach: Jim Hess (2nd season)
- Home stadium: Aggie Memorial Stadium

1991 Big West Conference football standings
	Conf.					Overall
Team	W		L		T	W		L		T
Fresno State +	6	–	1	–	0	10	–	2	–	0
San Jose State +	6	–	1	–	0	6	–	4	–	1
Utah State	5	–	2	–	0	5	–	6	–	0
Pacific (CA)	4	–	3	–	0	5	–	7	–	0
UNLV	2	–	5	–	0	4	–	7	–	0
Long Beach State	2	–	5	–	0	2	–	9	–	0
New Mexico State	2	–	5	–	0	2	–	9	–	0
Cal State Fullerton	1	–	6	–	0	2	–	9	–	0
+ – Conference co-champions

The 1991 New Mexico State Aggies football team was an American football team that represented New Mexico State University in the Big West Conference during the 1991 NCAA Division I-A football season. In their second year under head coach Jim Hess, the Aggies compiled a 2–9 record. The team played its home games at Aggie Memorial Stadium in Las Cruces, New Mexico.

== Schedule ==
Date	Opponent	Site	Result	Attendance	Source
September 14	UTEP*	Aggie Memorial Stadium; Las Cruces, NM (rivalry)	L 21–22	30,341	
September 21	at Kansas*	Memorial Stadium; Lawrence, KS	L 14–54	34,000	
September 28	at New Mexico*	University Stadium; Albuquerque, NM (rivalry)	L 10–17	22,441	
October 5	at Oregon*	Autzen Stadium; Eugene, OR	L 6–29	34,536	
October 12	San Jose State	Aggie Memorial Stadium; Las Cruces, NM	L 13–39	11,287	
October 19	Fresno State	Aggie Memorial Stadium; Las Cruces, NM	L 28–42	11,287	
October 26	at Pacific (CA)	Stagg Memorial Stadium; Stockton, CA	L 20–27		
November 2	at Cal State Fullerton	Santa Ana Stadium; Santa Ana, CA	W 35–12	3,112	
November 9	Long Beach State	Aggie Memorial Stadium; Las Cruces, NM	W 28–24	9,406	
November 16	at UNLV	Sam Boyd Stadium; Whitney, NV	L 28–38	13,729	
November 23	Utah State	Aggie Memorial Stadium; Las Cruces, NM	L 21–46	9,180	
*Non-conference game
