= 1991 Colorado State Rams football team =

American college football season

1991 Colorado State Rams football
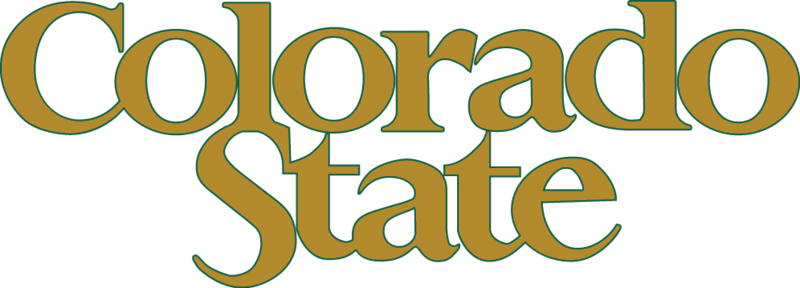
- Conference: Western Athletic Conference
- Record: 3–8 (2–6 WAC)
- Head coach: Earle Bruce (3rd season)
- Defensive coordinator: Chuck Heater (1st season)
- Home stadium: Hughes Stadium

1991 Western Athletic Conference football standings
	Conf.					Overall
Team	W		L		T	W		L		T
No. 23 BYU $	7	–	0	–	1	8	–	3	–	2
San Diego State	6	–	1	–	1	8	–	4	–	1
No. 25 Air Force	6	–	2	–	0	10	–	3	–	0
Utah	4	–	4	–	0	7	–	5	–	0
Hawaii	3	–	5	–	0	4	–	7	–	1
Wyoming	2	–	5	–	1	4	–	6	–	1
UTEP	2	–	5	–	1	4	–	7	–	1
Colorado State	2	–	6	–	0	3	–	8	–	0
New Mexico	2	–	6	–	0	2	–	9	–	0
$ – Conference champion; Rankings from AP Poll

The 1991 Colorado State Rams football team represented Colorado State University in the 1991 NCAA Division I-A football season. In its third season under head coach Earle Bruce, the team compiled a 3–8 record (2–6 against WAC opponents).

== Schedule ==
Date	Opponent	Site	TV	Result	Attendance	Source
August 31	Arkansas State*	Hughes Stadium; Fort Collins, CO		W 38–24	27,482	
September 7	Air Force	Hughes Stadium; Fort Collins, CO (rivalry)		L 26–31	31,977	
September 14	at No. 13 Nebraska*	Memorial Stadium; Lincoln, NE		L 14–71	76,379	
September 21	at Southern Miss*	M.M. Roberts Stadium; Hattiesburg, MS		L 7–39	20,154	
September 28	Hawaii	Hughes Stadium; Fort Collins, CO		W 28–16	30,476	
October 5	at UTEP	Sun Bowl; El Paso, TX		W 23–18	39,764	
October 19	at Utah	Robert Rice Stadium; Salt Lake City, UT		L 16–21	26,180	
October 26	Wyoming	War Memorial Stadium; Laramie, WY (Border War)		L 28–35	20,364	
October 31	BYU	Hughes Stadium; Fort Collins, CO	ESPN	L 17–40	25,203	
November 9	at San Diego State	Jack Murphy Stadium; San Diego, CA		L 32–42	30,163	
November 16	New Mexico	Hughes Stadium; Fort Collins, CO		L 36–38	10,171	
*Non-conference game; Rankings from AP Poll released prior to the game; Source:

== Roster ==
1991 Colorado State Rams football team roster
Players
Coaches
Offense

Pos.	#	Name	Class
QB	14	Anthoney Hill	Fr
WR	27	Greg Primus	Jr
QB	13	Kevin Verduge	Sr

Defense

Pos.	#	Name	Class
LB	?	Brian Schneider	Fr
CB	2	Selwyn Jones	Sr

Special teams

Pos.	#	Name	Class

Head coach

- Earle Bruce

Coordinators/assistant coaches

- Kit Cartwright
  (Assistant)

Legend

- (C) Team captain
- (S) Suspended
- (I) Ineligible
- Injured
- Redshirt

== After the season ==
=== NFL draft ===
The following Ram was selected in the 1992 NFL draft after the season.

Round	Pick	Player	Position	NFL team
7	177	Selwyn Jones	Defensive back	Cleveland Browns
