= 1991 Pacific Tigers football team =

American college football season

1991 Pacific Tigers football
- Conference: Big West Conference
- Record: 5–7 (4–3 Big West)
- Head coach: Walt Harris (3rd season)
- Offensive coordinator: John Shannon (3rd season)
- Offensive scheme: Run and shoot
- Defensive coordinator: John Neal (2nd season)
- Base defense: 4–3
- Home stadium: Stagg Memorial Stadium

1991 Big West Conference football standings
	Conf.					Overall
Team	W		L		T	W		L		T
Fresno State +	6	–	1	–	0	10	–	2	–	0
San Jose State +	6	–	1	–	0	6	–	4	–	1
Utah State	5	–	2	–	0	5	–	6	–	0
Pacific (CA)	4	–	3	–	0	5	–	7	–	0
UNLV	2	–	5	–	0	4	–	7	–	0
Long Beach State	2	–	5	–	0	2	–	9	–	0
New Mexico State	2	–	5	–	0	2	–	9	–	0
Cal State Fullerton	1	–	6	–	0	2	–	9	–	0
+ – Conference co-champions

The 1991 Pacific Tigers football team represented the University of the Pacific (UOP) in the 1991 NCAA Division I-A football season as a member of the Big West Conference.

The team was led by head coach Walt Harris, in his third year, and played their home games at Stagg Memorial Stadium in Stockton, California. They finished the season with a record of five wins and seven losses (5–7, 4–3 Big West). In a very high-scoring season, the Tigers were outscored by their opponents 435–481. Included in that total are three games where the Tigers scored over 50 points (56 vs. Cal State Fullerton, 63 vs. Cal Poly & 51 vs. Cal State Long Beach) and four games where the Tigers gave up over 50 points (86 vs. California, 55 vs. San Diego State, 64 vs. San Jose State, and 59 vs. Fresno State).

== Schedule ==
Date	Opponent	Site	Result	Attendance	Source
August 31	Sacramento State*	Stagg Memorial Stadium; Stockton, CA	L 40–43	17,500	
September 7	at California*	California Memorial Stadium; Berkeley, CA	L 24–86	39,000	
September 14	at San Diego State*	Jack Murphy Stadium; San Diego, CA	L 34–55	24,408	
September 21	at Hawaii*	Aloha Stadium; Halawa, HI	L 21–30	39,928	
October 5	Cal State Fullerton	Stagg Memorial Stadium; Stockton, CA	W 56–28	8,000	
October 12	Cal Poly*	Stagg Memorial Stadium; Stockton, CA	W 63–28	7,601–7,604	
October 19	at San Jose State	Spartan Stadium; San Jose, CA (Victory Bell)	L 47–64	16,238	
October 26	New Mexico State^{†}	Stagg Memorial Stadium; Stockton, CA	W 27–20		
November 2	at Long Beach State	Veterans Stadium; Long Beach, CA	W 51–24	3,012	
November 9	Fresno State	Stagg Memorial Stadium; Stockton, CA	L 14–59	11,289	
November 16	at Utah State	Romney Stadium; Logan, UT	L 14–21	8,217	
November 23	at UNLV	Sam Boyd Silver Bowl; Whitney, NV	W 44–23	13,515	
*Non-conference game; ^{†}Homecoming; Source:
