= 1991 Long Beach State 49ers football team =

American college football season

1991 Long Beach State 49ers football
- Conference: Big West Conference
- Record: 2–9 (2–5 Big West)
- Head coach: Willie Brown (1st season)
- Home stadium: Veterans Stadium

1991 Big West Conference football standings
| | Conf. | | | | | Overall |
| Team | W | | L | | T | W | | L | | T |
|---|---|---|---|---|---|---|---|---|---|---|
| Fresno State + | 6 | – | 1 | – | 0 | 10 | – | 2 | – | 0 |
| San Jose State + | 6 | – | 1 | – | 0 | 6 | – | 4 | – | 1 |
| Utah State | 5 | – | 2 | – | 0 | 5 | – | 6 | – | 0 |
| Pacific (CA) | 4 | – | 3 | – | 0 | 5 | – | 7 | – | 0 |
| UNLV | 2 | – | 5 | – | 0 | 4 | – | 7 | – | 0 |
| Long Beach State | 2 | – | 5 | – | 0 | 2 | – | 9 | – | 0 |
| New Mexico State | 2 | – | 5 | – | 0 | 2 | – | 9 | – | 0 |
| Cal State Fullerton | 1 | – | 6 | – | 0 | 2 | – | 9 | – | 0 |
+ – Conference co-champions

The 1991 Long Beach State 49ers football team represented California State University, Long Beach (Note: The official name of Long Beach State has been California State University, Long Beach since 1972. However, it is still commonly known as Long Beach State.) during the 1991 NCAA Division I-A football season.

Cal State Long Beach competed in the Big West Conference. The team was led by Willie Brown, and played home games at Veterans Stadium on the campus of Long Beach City College in Long Beach, California. The 49ers offense scored 207 points while the defense allowed 412 points.

This was the last season for Cal State Long Beach's football program.

== Schedule ==
| Date | Opponent | Site | Result | Attendance | Source |
|---|---|---|---|---|---|
| September 8 | at San Diego State* | Jack Murphy Stadium; San Diego, CA | L 13–49 | 26,749 | |
| September 14 | at No. 11 (I-AA) Boise State* | Bronco Stadium; Boise, ID | L 14–48 | 20,824 | |
| September 21 | San Jose State | Veterans Stadium; Long Beach, CA | L 20–32 | 4,329 | |
| September 28 | at Arizona* | Arizona Stadium; Tucson, AZ | L 21–45 | 46,334 | |
| October 5 | at UNLV | Sam Boyd Stadium; Whitney, NV | W 34–19 | 20,000 | |
| October 12 | at Fresno State | Bulldog Stadium; Fresno, CA | L 14–42 | 33,083 | |
| October 19 | at No. 2 Miami (FL)* | Miami Orange Bowl; Miami, FL | L 0–55 | 40,498 | |
| October 26 | Utah State | Veterans Stadium; Long Beach, CA | W 7–6 | 4,337 | |
| November 2 | Pacific (CA) | Veterans Stadium; Long Beach, CA | L 24–51 | 3,012 | |
| November 9 | at New Mexico State | Aggie Memorial Stadium; Las Cruces, NM | L 24–28 | 9,406 | |
| November 23 | at Cal State Fullerton | Santa Ana Stadium; Santa Ana, CA | L 36–37 | 2,123 | |
*Non-conference game; Rankings from AP Poll released prior to the game

== Team players in the NFL ==
With the end of the Cal State Long Beach football program, many players with eligibility remaining transferred to other schools. Two former 49ers were selected in subsequent NFL drafts.

| Player | Position | Round | Overall | NFL team |
| Terrell Davis | Running back | 6 | 196 | 1995 Denver Broncos |
| Jay Walker | Quarterback | 7 | 198 | 1996 New England Patriots |

In addition, one player who played at Cal State Long Beach in 1991 later played in the NFL, but was not drafted.

| Player | Position | First NFL team |
| Mark Seay | Wide receiver | 1993 San Diego Chargers |
