= 1991 Liberty Bowl =

- 33rd Liberty Bowl
Air Force Falcons	Mississippi State Bulldogs
(9–3)	(7–4)
WAC	SEC
38	15
Head coach: Fisher DeBerry	Head coach: Jackie Sherrill
	1	2	3	4	Total
Air Force	14	7	3	14	38
Mississippi State	0	7	0	8	15
- Date: December 29, 1991
- Season: 1991
- Stadium: Liberty Bowl Memorial Stadium
- Location: Memphis, Tennessee
- MVP: Rob Perez (QB, Air Force)
- Attendance: 61,497

United States TV coverage
- Network: ESPN
- Announcers: Sean McDonough and Craig James

The 1991 Liberty Bowl was a college football postseason bowl game played on December 29, 1991, in Memphis, Tennessee. The 33rd edition of the Liberty Bowl, the game matched the Air Force Falcons and the Mississippi State Bulldogs.

== Background ==
The Falcons finished 3rd in the Western Athletic Conference while the Bulldogs finished tied for 4th in the Southeastern Conference. This was Air Force's third consecutive Liberty Bowl; it was Mississippi State's first bowl appearance since 1981, and first Liberty Bowl since 1963.

== Game summary ==
One yard scoring runs by fullback Jason Jones and Rob Perez gave the Falcons a 14-0 first quarter lead, with Perez's touchdown coming six plays after the kickoff returner fumbled the ball back to the Falcons. Shannon Yates recovered a fumble and ran 35 yards for a touchdown to make it 21-0. Sleepy Robinson threw a touchdown pass to Trenell Edwards to culminate a 76-yard drive with :35 remaining in the half. While the Falcons only scored three points in the third quarter, they controlled the ball for 13:12, though Scott Hufford scored on a 31-yard touchdown run on the 2nd play of the fourth quarter. Michael Davis ran for a touchdown to make it 31-15 with 7:23 remaining, but the Falcons held on to win. Rob Perez ran for 318 yards while only attempting two passes in the entire game. Air Force outgained the Bulldogs in time of possession by 37:34-22:26.

== Aftermath ==
Air Force quarterback Rob Perez was named game MVP. He had also been MVP of the prior edition of the Liberty Bowl, making this the first (and to date, only) instance of a player being named Liberty Bowl MVP more than once. The Falcons finished the season ranked number 25 in the AP Poll. They reached the Liberty Bowl again the following season. The Bulldogs next played in the Liberty Bowl in 2007.
