= 1991 Hawaii Rainbow Warriors football team =

American college football season

1991 Hawaii Rainbow Warriors football
- Conference: Western Athletic Conference
- Record: 4–7–1 (3–5 WAC)
- Head coach: Bob Wagner (5th season)
- Offensive coordinator: Paul Johnson (5th season)
- Offensive scheme: Triple option
- Defensive coordinator: Rich Ellerson (5th season)
- Base defense: 4–3
- Home stadium: Aloha Stadium

1991 Western Athletic Conference football standings
| | Conf. | | | | | Overall |
| Team | W | | L | | T | W | | L | | T |
|---|---|---|---|---|---|---|---|---|---|---|
| No. 23 BYU $ | 7 | – | 0 | – | 1 | 8 | – | 3 | – | 2 |
| San Diego State | 6 | – | 1 | – | 1 | 8 | – | 4 | – | 1 |
| No. 25 Air Force | 6 | – | 2 | – | 0 | 10 | – | 3 | – | 0 |
| Utah | 4 | – | 4 | – | 0 | 7 | – | 5 | – | 0 |
| Hawaii | 3 | – | 5 | – | 0 | 4 | – | 7 | – | 1 |
| Wyoming | 2 | – | 5 | – | 1 | 4 | – | 6 | – | 1 |
| UTEP | 2 | – | 5 | – | 1 | 4 | – | 7 | – | 1 |
| Colorado State | 2 | – | 6 | – | 0 | 3 | – | 8 | – | 0 |
| New Mexico | 2 | – | 6 | – | 0 | 2 | – | 9 | – | 0 |
$ – Conference champion; Rankings from AP Poll

The 1991 Hawaii Rainbow Warriors football team represented the University of Hawaiʻi at Mānoa in the Western Athletic Conference during the 1991 NCAA Division I-A football season. In their fifth season under head coach Bob Wagner, the Rainbow Warriors compiled a 4–7–1 record.

== Schedule ==
| Date | Opponent | Site | Result | Attendance | Source |
|---|---|---|---|---|---|
| August 31 | at Wyoming | War Memorial Stadium; Laramie, WY (rivalry) | W 32–17 | 22,508 | |
| September 7 | at No. 15 Iowa* | Kinnick Stadium; Iowa City, IA | L 10–53 | 70,044 | |
| September 14 | New Mexico | Aloha Stadium; Halawa, HI | W 35–13 | 43,300 | |
| September 21 | Pacific (CA)* | Aloha Stadium; Halawa, HI | W 30–21 | 39,928 | |
| September 28 | at Colorado State | Hughes Stadium; Fort Collins, CO | L 16–28 | 30,476 | |
| October 5 | San Diego State^{†} | Aloha Stadium; Halawa, HI | L 21–47 | 38,259 | |
| October 19 | at BYU | Cougar Stadium; Provo, UT | L 18–35 | 65,866 | |
| November 2 | Utah | Aloha Stadium; Halawa, HI | W 52–26 | 42,781 | |
| November 9 | UTEP | Aloha Stadium; Halawa, HI | L 24–41 | 33,824 | |
| November 16 | at San Jose State* | Spartan Stadium; San Jose, CA (rivalry) | T 35–35 | 20,289 | |
| November 23 | Air Force | Aloha Stadium; Halawa, HI (rivalry) | L 20–24 | 36,884 | |
| November 30 | No. 18 Notre Dame* | Aloha Stadium; Halawa, HI | L 42–48 | 50,000 | |
*Non-conference game; ^{†}Homecoming; Rankings from AP Poll released prior to the game

== After the season ==
=== NFL draft ===
The following Rainbow Warrior was selected in the 1992 NFL draft after the season.

| Round | Pick | Player | Position | NFL team |
|---|---|---|---|---|
| 6 | 160 | Jeff Sydner | Wide receiver | Philadelphia Eagles |
