= 1991 Wyoming Cowboys football team =

American college football season

1991 Wyoming Cowboys football
- Conference: Western Athletic Conference
- Record: 4–6–1 (2–5–1 WAC)
- Head coach: Joe Tiller (1st season)
- Offensive coordinator: Larry Korpitz (1st season)
- Defensive coordinator: Scott Downing (1st season)
- Home stadium: War Memorial Stadium

1991 Western Athletic Conference football standings
	Conf.					Overall
Team	W		L		T	W		L		T
No. 23 BYU $	7	–	0	–	1	8	–	3	–	2
San Diego State	6	–	1	–	1	8	–	4	–	1
No. 25 Air Force	6	–	2	–	0	10	–	3	–	0
Utah	4	–	4	–	0	7	–	5	–	0
Hawaii	3	–	5	–	0	4	–	7	–	1
Wyoming	2	–	5	–	1	4	–	6	–	1
UTEP	2	–	5	–	1	4	–	7	–	1
Colorado State	2	–	6	–	0	3	–	8	–	0
New Mexico	2	–	6	–	0	2	–	9	–	0
$ – Conference champion; Rankings from AP Poll

The 1991 Wyoming Cowboys football team represented the University of Wyoming in the 1991 NCAA Division I-A football season. It was the Cowboys' 96th season and they competed as a member of the Western Athletic Conference (WAC). The team was led by head coach Joe Tiller, in his first year, and played their home games at War Memorial Stadium in Laramie, Wyoming. They finished with a record of four wins, six losses and one tie (4–6–1, 2–5–1 WAC). The offense scored 305 points, while the defense allowed 357 points.

== Schedule ==
Date	Opponent	Site	TV	Result	Attendance	Source
August 31	Hawaii	War Memorial Stadium; Laramie, WY (rivalry)		L 17–32	22,508	
September 7	at No. 12 Colorado*	Folsom Field; Boulder, CO	ESPN	L 13–30	52,155	
September 14	Southwestern Louisiana*	War Memorial Stadium; Laramie, WY		W 28–15	15,866	
September 21	Texas Tech*	War Memorial Stadium; Laramie, WY		W 22–17	18,183	
September 28	UTEP	War Memorial Stadium; Laramie, WY		T 28–28	16,135	
October 5	at Air Force	Falcon Stadium; Colorado Springs, CO	ABC	L 28–51	40,227	
October 12	Utah^{†}	War Memorial Stadium; Laramie, WY		L 42–57	20,709	
October 19	at New Mexico	University Stadium; Albuquerque, NM		W 39–19	12,500	
October 26	Colorado State	War Memorial Stadium; Laramie, WY (Border War)		W 35–28	20,364	
November 2	at San Diego State	Jack Murphy Stadium; San Diego, CA		L 22–24	35,961	
November 9	at BYU	Cougar Stadium; Provo, UT		L 31–56	65,593	
*Non-conference game; ^{†}Homecoming; Rankings from AP Poll released prior to the game; Source:

== Roster ==
1991 Wyoming Cowboys football team roster
Players			Coaches
Offense: Pos. / # / Name / Class	Defense: Pos. / # / Name / Class	Special teams: Pos. / # / Name / Class	Head coach: Joe Tiller; Coordinators/assistant coaches: Kevin Sumlin – Wide receivers; Legend: (C) Team captain; (S) Suspended; (I) Ineligible; Injured; Redshirt

== Team players in the NFL ==
The following were selected in the 1992 NFL draft.

Player	Position	Round	Overall	NFL team
Doug Rigby	Defensive end	11	298	Kansas City Chiefs
