= 1991 Air Force Falcons football team =

American college football season

1991 Air Force Falcons football
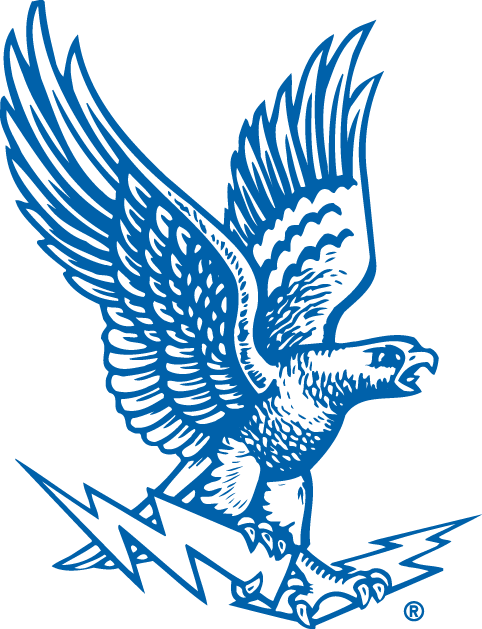

Liberty Bowl champion

Liberty Bowl, W 38–15 vs. Mississippi State
- Conference: Western Athletic Conference

Ranking
- Coaches: No. 24
- AP: No. 25
- Record: 10–3 (6–2 WAC)
- Head coach: Fisher DeBerry (8th season)
- Offensive coordinator: Paul Hamilton (2nd season)
- Offensive scheme: Wishbone triple option
- Defensive coordinator: Cal McCombs (2nd season)
- Base defense: 3–4
- Captains: Rob Perez; Joe Wood; Shanon Yates
- Home stadium: Falcon Stadium

1991 Western Athletic Conference football standings
	Conf.					Overall
Team	W		L		T	W		L		T
No. 23 BYU $	7	–	0	–	1	8	–	3	–	2
San Diego State	6	–	1	–	1	8	–	4	–	1
No. 25 Air Force	6	–	2	–	0	10	–	3	–	0
Utah	4	–	4	–	0	7	–	5	–	0
Hawaii	3	–	5	–	0	4	–	7	–	1
Wyoming	2	–	5	–	1	4	–	6	–	1
UTEP	2	–	5	–	1	4	–	7	–	1
Colorado State	2	–	6	–	0	3	–	8	–	0
New Mexico	2	–	6	–	0	2	–	9	–	0
$ – Conference champion; Rankings from AP Poll

The 1991 Air Force Falcons football team represented the United States Air Force Academy as a member of the Western Athletic Conference (WAC) during the 1991 NCAA Division I-A football season. Led by eighth-year head coach Fisher DeBerry, the Falcons compiled an overall record of 10–3 with a mark of 6–2 in conference play, placing third in the WAC. Air Force was invited to the Liberty Bowl, where the Falcons defeated Mississippi State. The team played home games at Falcon Stadium in Colorado Springs, Colorado

== Schedule ==
Date	Opponent	Site	TV	Result	Attendance	Source
August 31	Weber State*	Falcon Stadium; Colorado Springs, CO		W 48–31	41,294	
September 7	at Colorado State	Hughes Stadium; Fort Collins, CO (rivalry)		W 31–26	31,977	
September 14	at Utah	Robert Rice Stadium; Salt Lake City, UT		W 24–21	28,619	
September 21	San Diego State	Falcon Stadium; Colorado Springs, CO		W 21–20	43,011	
September 28	at BYU	Cougar Stadium; Provo, UT		L 7–21	65,899	
October 5	Wyoming	Falcon Stadium; Colorado Springs, CO	ABC	W 51–28	40,227	
October 12	at Navy*	Navy–Marine Corps Memorial Stadium; Annapolis, MD (Commander-in-Chief's Trophy)		W 46–6	35,640	
October 19	No. 5 Notre Dame*	Falcon Stadium; Colorado Springs, CO (rivalry)	ESPN	L 15–28	52,024	
October 26	UTEP	Falcon Stadium; Colorado Springs, CO		W 20–13	38,975	
November 2	at New Mexico	University Stadium; Albuquerque, NM		L 32–34	10,793	
November 9	Army*	Falcon Stadium; Colorado Springs, CO (Commander-in-Chief's Trophy)		W 25–0	49,203	
November 23	at Hawaii	Aloha Stadium; Halawa, HI (rivalry)		W 24–20	36,884	
December 29	vs. Mississippi State*	Liberty Bowl Memorial Stadium; Memphis, TN (Liberty Bowl)	ESPN	W 38–15	61,497	
*Non-conference game; Rankings from AP Poll released prior to the game; Source:

== Roster ==
1991 Air Force Falcons football team roster
Players
Coaches
Offense

Pos.	#	Name	Class
QB	7	Rob Perez	Sr

Defense

Pos.	#	Name	Class
CB	3	Carlton McDonald	Jr
LB		Vergil Simpson	Jr

Special teams

Pos.	#	Name	Class
K		Joe Wood

Head coach

- Fisher DeBerry

Coordinators/assistant coaches

Legend

- (C) Team captain
- (S) Suspended
- (I) Ineligible
- Injured
- Redshirt

== Awards and honors ==
- Kette Dornbush, Bullard Award

== NFL draft ==
The following Falcon was selected in the National Football League draft following the season.

Round	Pick	Player	Position	NFL team
12	332	Joe Wood	Kicker	Houston Oilers
