= 1991 UNLV Rebels football team =

American college football season

1991 UNLV Rebels football
- Conference: Big West Conference
- Record: 4–7 (2–5 Big West)
- Head coach: Jim Strong (2nd season)
- Home stadium: Sam Boyd Silver Bowl

1991 Big West Conference football standings
	Conf.					Overall
Team	W		L		T	W		L		T
Fresno State +	6	–	1	–	0	10	–	2	–	0
San Jose State +	6	–	1	–	0	6	–	4	–	1
Utah State	5	–	2	–	0	5	–	6	–	0
Pacific (CA)	4	–	3	–	0	5	–	7	–	0
UNLV	2	–	5	–	0	4	–	7	–	0
Long Beach State	2	–	5	–	0	2	–	9	–	0
New Mexico State	2	–	5	–	0	2	–	9	–	0
Cal State Fullerton	1	–	6	–	0	2	–	9	–	0
+ – Conference co-champions

The 1991 UNLV Rebels football team was an American football team that represented the University of Nevada, Las Vegas (UNLV) as a member of the Big West Conference during the 1991 NCAA Division I-A football season. In their second year under head coach Jim Strong, the Rebels compiled an overall record of 4–7 with a mark of 3–4 in conference play, placing in a three-way tie for fifth in the Big West. The team played home games at the Sam Boyd Silver Bowl in Whitney, Nevada.

== Schedule ==
Date	Time	Opponent	Site	Result	Attendance	Source
September 7		at No. 5 Nevada*	Mackay Stadium; Reno, NV (Fremont Cannon)	L 8–50	24,123	
September 14	7:00 p.m.	Oregon State*	Sam Boyd Silver Bowl; Whitney, NV	W 23–9	19,141	
September 21		at New Mexico*	University Stadium; Albuquerque, NM	W 23–22	16,679	
September 28		Washington State*	Sam Boyd Silver Bowl; Whitney, NV	L 13–40	20,628	
October 5		Long Beach State	Sam Boyd Silver Bowl; Whitney, NV	L 19–34	20,090	
October 12		at Cal State Fullerton	Santa Ana Stadium; Santa Ana, CA	W 25–3	3,012	
October 26		at Fresno State	Bulldog Stadium; Fresno, CA	L 22–48	30,866	
November 2		at San Jose State	Spartan Stadium; San Jose, CA	L 12–55	16,524	
November 9		Utah State	Sam Boyd Silver Bowl; Whitney, NV	L 14–27	11,787	
November 16		New Mexico State	Sam Boyd Silver Bowl; Whitney, NV	W 38–28	13,729	
November 23		Pacific (CA)	Sam Boyd Silver Bowl; Whitney, NV	L 23–44	13,515	
*Non-conference game; Rankings from NCAA Division I-AA Football Committee Poll released prior to the game; All times are in Pacific time; Source:
