= 1991 Cal State Fullerton Titans football team =

American college football season

1991 Cal State Fullerton Titans football
- Conference: Big West Conference
- Record: 2–9 (1–6 Big West)
- Head coach: Gene Murphy (12th season)
- Offensive coordinator: Jim Chaney (1st season)
- Offensive scheme: Pro-style
- Defensive coordinator: Kirk Harmon (4th season)
- Base defense: 4–3
- Home stadium: Santa Ana Stadium

1991 Big West Conference football standings
	Conf.					Overall
Team	W		L		T	W		L		T
Fresno State +	6	–	1	–	0	10	–	2	–	0
San Jose State +	6	–	1	–	0	6	–	4	–	1
Utah State	5	–	2	–	0	5	–	6	–	0
Pacific (CA)	4	–	3	–	0	5	–	7	–	0
UNLV	2	–	5	–	0	4	–	7	–	0
Long Beach State	2	–	5	–	0	2	–	9	–	0
New Mexico State	2	–	5	–	0	2	–	9	–	0
Cal State Fullerton	1	–	6	–	0	2	–	9	–	0
+ – Conference co-champions

The 1991 Cal State Fullerton Titans football team represented California State University, Fullerton as a member of the Big West Conference during the 1991 NCAA Division I-A football season. Led by 12th-year head coach Gene Murphy, Cal State Fullerton compiled an overall record of 2–9 with a mark of 1–6 in conference play, placing last out of eight teams in the Big West for the second consecutive season. The Titans their home games at Santa Ana Stadium in Santa Ana, California. This was the last year they played in Santa Ana Stadium, as the Titans would move to a new, on-campus stadium in 1992.

== Schedule ==
Date	Opponent	Site	Result	Attendance	Source
August 31	at Mississippi State*	Scott Field; Mississippi State, MS	L 3–47	30,307	
September 7	at Texas Tech*	Jones Stadium; Lubbock, TX	L 7–41	36,228	
September 21	Cal State Northridge*	Santa Ana Stadium; Santa Ana, CA	W 17–10	2,921	
September 28	at Georgia*	Sanford Stadium; Athens, GA	L 14–27	76,117	
October 5	at Pacific (CA)	Stagg Memorial Stadium; Stockton, CA	L 28–56	8,000	
October 12	UNLV	Santa Ana Stadium; Santa Ana, CA	L 3–25	3,012	
October 19	at Utah State	Romney Stadium; Logan, UT	L 3–26	8,957	
November 2	New Mexico State	Santa Ana Stadium; Santa Ana, CA	L 12–35	3,112	
November 9	at San Jose State	Spartan Stadium; San Jose, CA	L 7–35	10,112	
November 16	at Fresno State	Bulldog Stadium; Fresno, CA	L 7–38	31,081	
November 23	Long Beach State	Santa Ana Stadium; Santa Ana, CA	W 37–36	2,123	
*Non-conference game

== Team players in the NFL ==
The following Titan was selected in the 1992 NFL draft after the season.

Round	Pick	Player	Position	NFL team
10	259	Reggie Yarbrough	Running back	Phoenix Cardinals
