= John Baxter (American football) =

American football coach (born 1963)

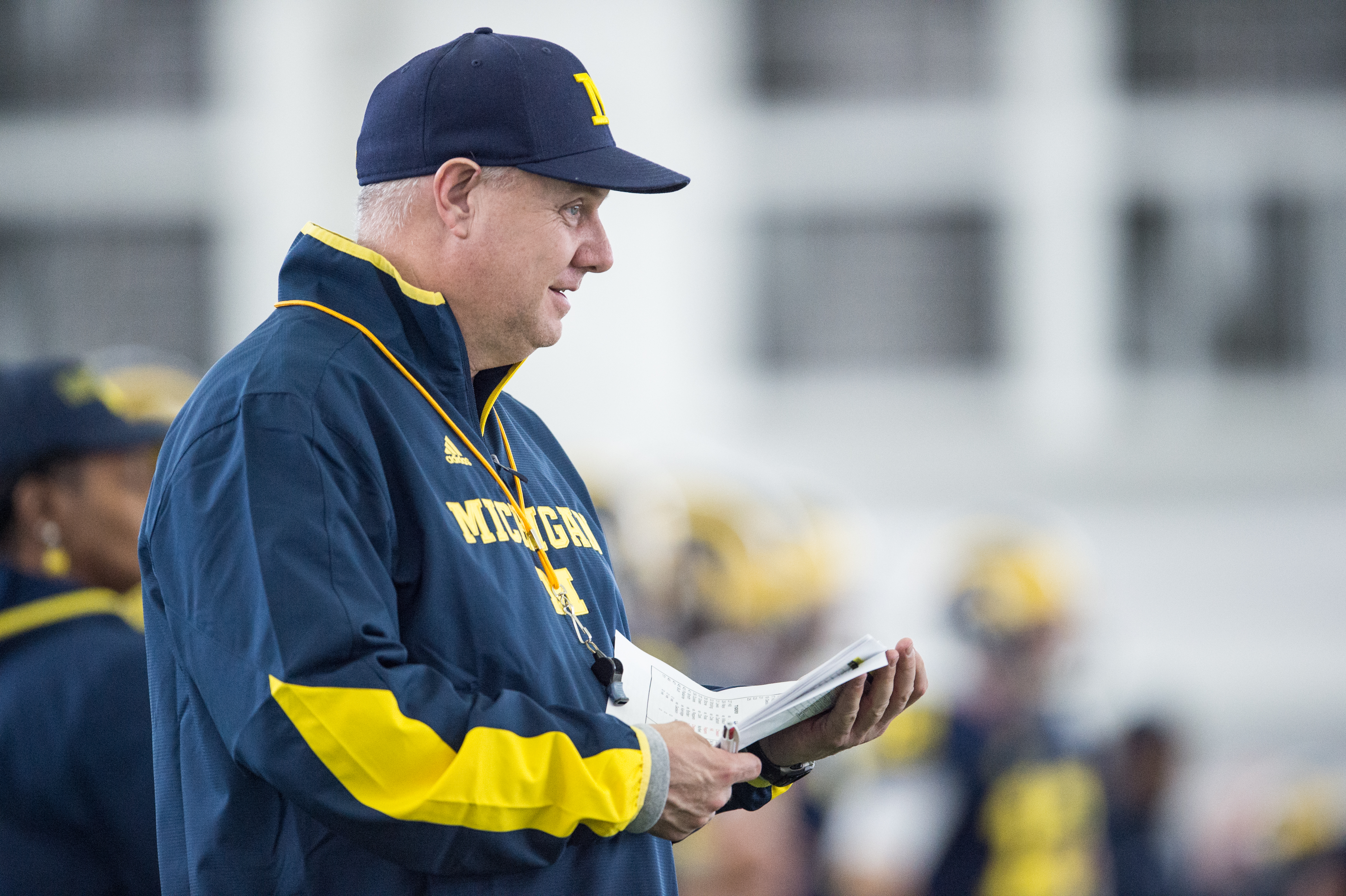

Current position
- Title: Special teams coordinator
- Team: Fresno State
- Conference: MW

Biographical details
- Born: June 28, 1963 (age 63); Chicago, Illinois

Coaching career (HC unless noted)
- 1986–1987: Iowa State (GA - DL)
- 1988: Arizona (GA - DB)
- 1989: Maine (OLB/STC/RC)
- 1990–1991: Arizona (TE/STC)
- 1992–1993: Maryland (RB/STC)
- 1994–1995: Tulane (TE/STC)
- 1997–2001: Fresno State (TE/STC/AHC)
- 2002: Fresno State (WR/STC/AHC)
- 2003: Fresno State (TE/STC/AHC)
- 2004–2008: Fresno State (WR/STC/AHC)
- 2009: Fresno State (TE/STC/AHC)
- 2010–2012: USC (STC/AHC)
- 2013: USC (TE/STC/AHC)
- 2015: Michigan (STC)
- 2016–2019: USC (STC/TE)
- 2022–present: Fresno State (AHC/TE/STC)

Accomplishments and honors

Awards
- Clovis co-citizen of the Year (2006); National Special Teams Coordinator of the Year (2011)

John Baxter (born June 28, 1963) is an American football coach. He is currently the special teams coordinator at Fresno State University. He previously served as special teams coordinator at the University of Southern California. He is also the founder of the education company Academic Gameplan, and author of the 2013 book I Hate School: How a College Football Coach Has Inspired Students to Value Education and Become Lifelong Learners (ISBN 978-1599324296).

== Career ==
Baxter's coaching career includes stints at Iowa State, Arizona, Maine, Maryland, Tulane, Fresno State, USC, and Michigan. He has served under coaches such as Jim Harbaugh, Lane Kiffin, Ed Orgeron, Pat Hill, and Dick Tomey.

From 1994 to 1995, Baxter coached football at Tulane University. From 1997 to 2009, he coached at Fresno State University under Pat Hill and served an integral role in achieving ten bowl bids from 1999 to 2009.

From 2010 to 2013, Baxter coached at the University of Southern California under Lane Kiffin and Ed Orgeron. After the 2011 season, he was awarded "National Special Teams Coordinator of the Year" by FootballScoop .

Baxter was named special teams coordinator at Michigan on January 16, 2015.

On December 28, 2019, USC fired Baxter as their special teams coordinator.

== Personal ==
Baxter is a graduate of Loras College and has earned a master's degree in higher education from Iowa State University. He and his wife, Jill, are the parents of Kelly and McKenzie. Jill's father is former Utah and Weber State University head coach Ron McBride.
