= 2002 Silicon Valley Football Classic =

American college football game

Georgia Tech Yellow Jackets	Fresno State Bulldogs
(7–5)	(8–5)
21	30
Head coach: Chan Gailey	Head coach: Pat Hill
	1	2	3	4	Total
Georgia Tech	7	0	14	0	21
Fresno State	3	10	7	10	30
- Date: December 31, 2002
- Season: 2002
- Stadium: Spartan Stadium
- Location: San Jose, California
- Favorite: Georgia Tech by 6.5
- Referee: Jim Jackson (Sun Belt)
- Attendance: 10,132

United States TV coverage
- Network: ESPN2
- Announcers: Chris Marlowe, Jim Donnan, Tracy Wolfson

The 2002 Silicon Valley Football Classic was a post-season college football bowl game between the Georgia Tech Yellow Jackets and the Fresno State Bulldogs on December 31, 2002, at Spartan Stadium in San Jose, California. Fresno State won the game 30–21; the victory was the school's first bowl victory since 1992.
