= Keith Embray =

American gridiron football player (born 1969)

No. 96
- Position: Defensive end

Personal information
- Born: November 29, 1969 (age 56); San Diego, California, U.S.
- Listed height: 6 ft 4 in (1.93 m)
- Listed weight: 265 lb (120 kg)

Career information
- High school: Mount Miguel (Spring Valley, California)
- College: Utah
- NFL draft: 1993: undrafted

Career history
- San Diego Chargers (1993)*; Las Vegas Posse (1994); Hamilton Tiger-Cats (1995–1996); Portland Forest Dragons (1999); Tennessee Titans (1999-2001)
- * Offseason or practice squad member only
- Stats at Pro Football Reference

Keith Embray (born November 29, 1969) is an American former professional football player who was a defensive end in the Canadian Football League (CFL) and National Football League (NFL). He played college football for the Utah Utes. He played in the CFL for the Las Vegas Posse in 1994 and the Hamilton Tiger-Cats from 1995 to 1996. He then played in the NFL for the Tennessee Titans in 2000.
