= 1991 Fresno State Bulldogs football team =

American college football season

1991 Fresno State Bulldogs football

Big West co-champion

California Bowl, L 21–28 vs. Bowling Green
- Conference: Big West Conference
- Record: 10–2 (6–1 Big West)
- Head coach: Jim Sweeney (14th season)
- Home stadium: Bulldog Stadium

1991 Big West Conference football standings
	Conf.					Overall
Team	W		L		T	W		L		T
Fresno State +	6	–	1	–	0	10	–	2	–	0
San Jose State +	6	–	1	–	0	6	–	4	–	1
Utah State	5	–	2	–	0	5	–	6	–	0
Pacific (CA)	4	–	3	–	0	5	–	7	–	0
UNLV	2	–	5	–	0	4	–	7	–	0
Long Beach State	2	–	5	–	0	2	–	9	–	0
New Mexico State	2	–	5	–	0	2	–	9	–	0
Cal State Fullerton	1	–	6	–	0	2	–	9	–	0
+ – Conference co-champions

The 1991 Fresno State Bulldogs football team represented California State University, Fresno as a member of the Big West Conference during the 1991 NCAA Division I-A football season. Led by 14th-year head coach Jim Sweeney, Fresno State compiled an overall record of 10–2 with a mark of 6–1 in conference play, sharing the Big West title with San Jose State. The Bulldogs played their home games at Bulldog Stadium in Fresno, California.

Fresno State earned NCAA Division I-A postseason bowl game berth in 1991. They played the Mid-American Conference (MAC) champion Bowling Green in the 11th annual California Bowl inat Bulldog Stadium on December 14. The Bulldogs were defeated by Bowling Green, 28–21, breaking their four-game bowl win streak.

In the fourth game of the season, Fresno State scored a school record 94 points against the New Mexico, including 66 in the first half. Both of those marks are school records that still stand as of the end of the 2021 season.

== Schedule ==
Date	Opponent	Rank	Site	Result	Attendance	Source
September 7	Northern Illinois*		Bulldog Stadium; Fresno, CA	W 35–7	34,112	
September 14	at Washington State*		Martin Stadium; Pullman, WA	W 34–30	20,647	
September 21	at Oregon State*		Parker Stadium; Corvallis, OR	W 24–20	22,047	
October 5	New Mexico*		Bulldog Stadium; Fresno, CA	W 94–17	33,739	
October 12	Long Beach State		Bulldog Stadium; Fresno, CA	W 42–14	33,083	
October 19	at New Mexico State		Aggie Memorial Stadium; Las Cruces, NM	W 42–28	11,287	
October 26	UNLV		Bulldog Stadium; Fresno, CA	W 48–22	30,866	
November 2	at Utah State	No. 25	Romney Stadium; Logan, UT	L 19–20	9,814	
November 9	at Pacific (CA)		Stagg Memorial Stadium; Stockton, CA	W 59–14	11,289	
November 16	Cal State Fullerton		Bulldog Stadium; Fresno, CA	W 38–7	31,081	
November 23	San Jose State		Bulldog Stadium; Fresno, CA (rivalry)	W 31–28	40,513	
December 14	Bowling Green*		Bulldog Stadium; Fresno, CA (California Bowl)	L 21–28	34,877	
*Non-conference game; Rankings from AP Poll released prior to the game; Source:

== Team players in the NFL ==
The following Bulldogs were selected in the 1992 NFL draft after the season.

Round	Pick	Player	Position	NFL team
2	33	Marquez Pope	Defensive back	San Diego Chargers
5	135	Tony Brown	Defensive back	Houston Oilers
11	296	Mark Barsotti	Quarterback	Miami Dolphins
