= Frank Cignetti Jr. =

American football coach (born 1965)

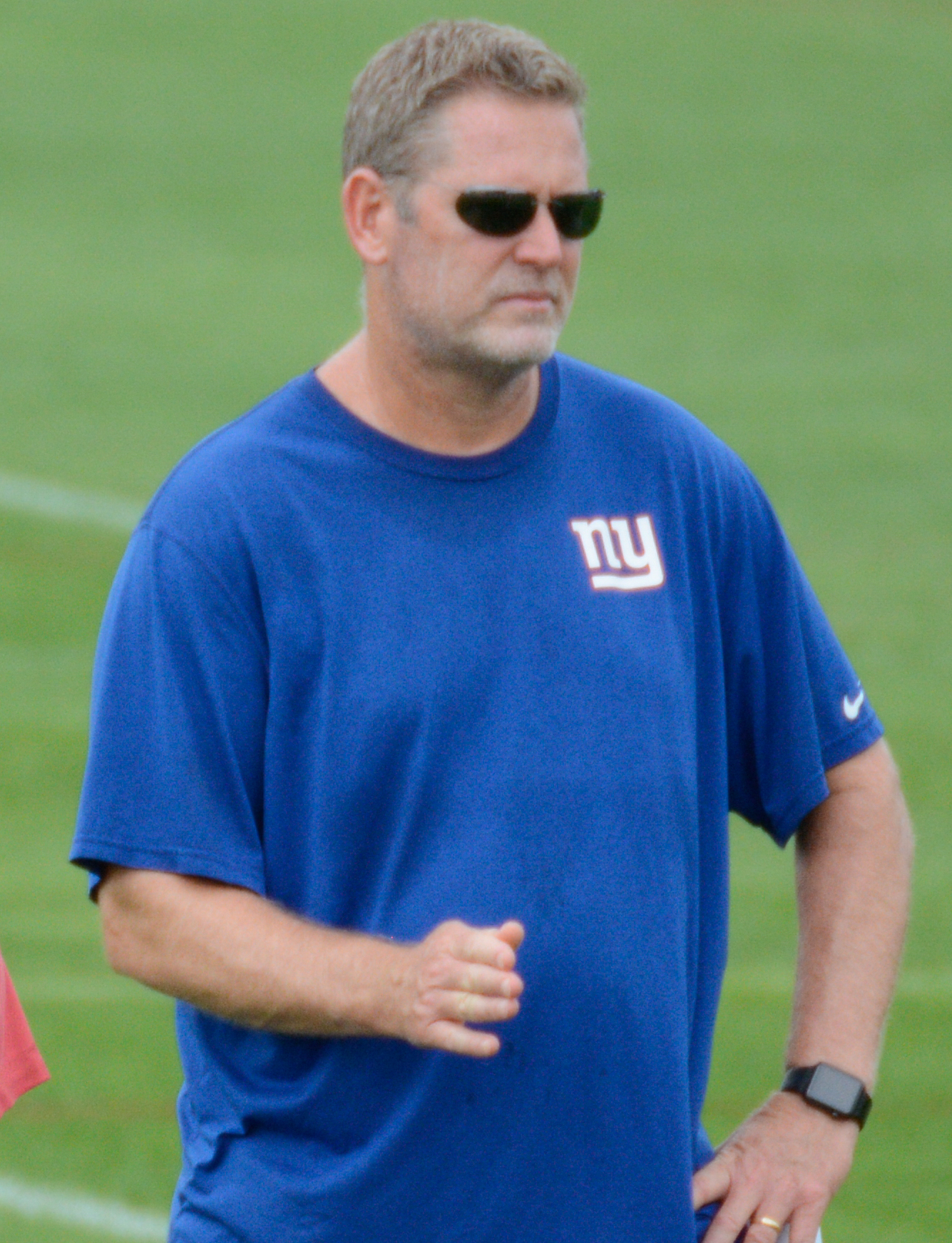
- Cignetti in 2016

Pittsburgh Steelers
- Title: Senior offensive assistant

Personal information
- Born: October 4, 1965 (age 61); Pittsburgh, Pennsylvania, U.S.

Career information
- High school: Indiana Area (Indiana, Pennsylvania)
- College: IUP

Career history
- Pittsburgh (1989) Graduate assistant; IUP (1990–1998); Wide receivers coach (1990–1992); Defensive backs coach (1993–1994); Quarterbacks coach (1995–1996); Offensive coordinator & quarterbacks coach (1997–1998); Kansas City Chiefs (1999) Offensive assistant; New Orleans Saints (2000–2001) Quarterbacks coach; Fresno State (2002–2005) Offensive coordinator & quarterbacks coach; North Carolina (2006) Offensive coordinator & quarterbacks coach; San Francisco 49ers (2007) Quarterbacks coach; California (2008) Offensive coordinator & quarterbacks coach; Pittsburgh (2009–2010) Offensive coordinator & quarterbacks coach; Rutgers (2011) Offensive coordinator & quarterbacks coach; St. Louis Rams (2012–2015); Quarterbacks coach (2012–2014); Offensive coordinator (2015); New York Giants (2016–2017) Quarterbacks coach; Green Bay Packers (2018) Quarterbacks coach; Boston College (2020–2021) Offensive coordinator & quarterbacks coach; Pittsburgh (2022–2023) Offensive coordinator & quarterbacks coach; IUP (2025) Offensive coordinator; Pittsburgh Steelers (2026–present) Senior offensive assistant
- Coaching profile at Pro Football Reference

Frank Cignetti Jr. (born October 4, 1965) is an American football coach who is currently a senior offensive assistant for the Pittsburgh Steelers. Before joining the Steelers, he was the offensive coordinator for IUP. Before joining IUP, he was the offensive coordinator for Boston College and Pitt, as well the quarterbacks coach for the Green Bay Packers of the National Football League (NFL). He has also been the quarterbacks coach for the New York Giants in 2016 and 2017. Prior to that, he served as the quarterbacks coach for the St. Louis Rams from 2012 to 2014 and offensive coordinator for the Rams in 2015.

== Coaching career ==
Cignetti began his coaching career as a graduate assistant at Pittsburgh in 1989.

From 1990 to 1998, Cignetti was on his father's IUP Crimson Hawks football team coaching staff at Indiana University of Pennsylvania (IUP), where he was an all-conference safety before earning his bachelor's degree in 1988. He served IUP as receivers, secondary and quarterbacks coach before elevating to offensive coordinator for his final two seasons. During his tenure, IUP twice advanced to the NCAA Division II national title game and earned a berth in the semifinals four times.

Cignetti landed his first NFL appointment in 1999 as a quality control assistant with the Kansas City Chiefs.

From 2000 to 2001, Cignetti served as quarterbacks coach with the New Orleans Saints, where he helped quarterback Jeff Blake to a career-best passer rating and also helped Aaron Brooks produce some of the best statistics of his career en route to a Pro Bowl alternate selection.

From 2002 to 2005, Cignetti served as the offensive coordinator for Fresno State. In 2004, Fresno State averaged 52.8 points over its final six games and became just the sixth team in NCAA history to score 50 or more points in four consecutive contests, the team also led the Western Athletic Conference in average yards per carry and amassed 65 touchdowns.

Cignetti was the offensive coordinator and quarterbacks coach for North Carolina in 2006. When Butch Davis was hired to replace former head coach John Bunting at North Carolina, Cignetti was relieved of his coaching duties.

In 2007, Cignetti was hired by the San Francisco 49ers to be their quarterbacks coach.

Cignetti served as the offensive coordinator and quarterbacks coach for California in 2008. In his first season with the Bears, the team averaged nearly 33 points per game en route to a 9-4 record and victory over the Miami Hurricanes in the Emerald Bowl.

On February 18, 2009, Cignetti accepted a position as the offensive coordinator of the University of Pittsburgh football team under head coach Dave Wannstedt. In Cignetti's first season as Pittsburgh's play caller, the Panthers averaged 32.1 points per game, one of the top five scoring averages in school history. Pitt's offensive arsenal included a 1,700-yard rusher in RB Dion Lewis and 1,000-yard receiver in WR Jon Baldwin. In addition, QB Bill Stull ranked among the nation's most efficient passers, throwing for more than 2,600 yards and 21 touchdowns. In total, seven of Pitt's offensive players were named All-Big East, including Lewis, who was honored as the league's Offensive Player of the Year and Rookie of the Year.

Cignetti served as the offensive coordinator for Rutgers in 2011. In that season, the Scarlet Knights averaged 26.4 points per game, fourth most in the Big East, and Rutgers ranked third in the conference in passing offense.

On February 7, 2012, Cignetti was hired by the St. Louis Rams to be their quarterbacks coach. Cignetti worked with Sam Bradford, the third-year signal caller who set new career highs in passing yards (3,702), touchdown passes (21) and Passer rating (82.5) in 2012. On February 12, 2015, Cignetti was promoted to offensive coordinator, he held that position for 12 games. On December 7, 2015, Cignetti was fired by the Rams, the Rams rank 31st in yards per game (296.3), 32nd in passing yards per game (178) and first downs (175), and tied for 30th in offensive touchdowns (18).

On January 21, 2016, Cignetti was hired by the New York Giants to be their quarterbacks coach.

On January 10, 2018, it was announced that Cignetti had been hired by the Green Bay Packers to be their quarterbacks coach.

On February 12, 2026, the Pittsburgh Steelers hired Cignetti to serve as a senior offensive assistant under new head coach Mike McCarthy.

== Personal life ==
Cignetti was born in Pittsburgh, Pennsylvania, he is the son of Frank Cignetti Sr., the longtime head coach of the IUP Crimson Hawks football team at Indiana University of Pennsylvania (IUP) and West Virginia Mountaineers football team at West Virginia University. He is of Italian descent through his grandparents.

Cignetti's brother, Curt, is currently the head coach of the Indiana football team at Indiana University in Bloomington, Indiana.

Cignetti and his wife, Ellen, have four children.
