= 1999 Las Vegas Bowl =

- 8th Las Vegas Bowl
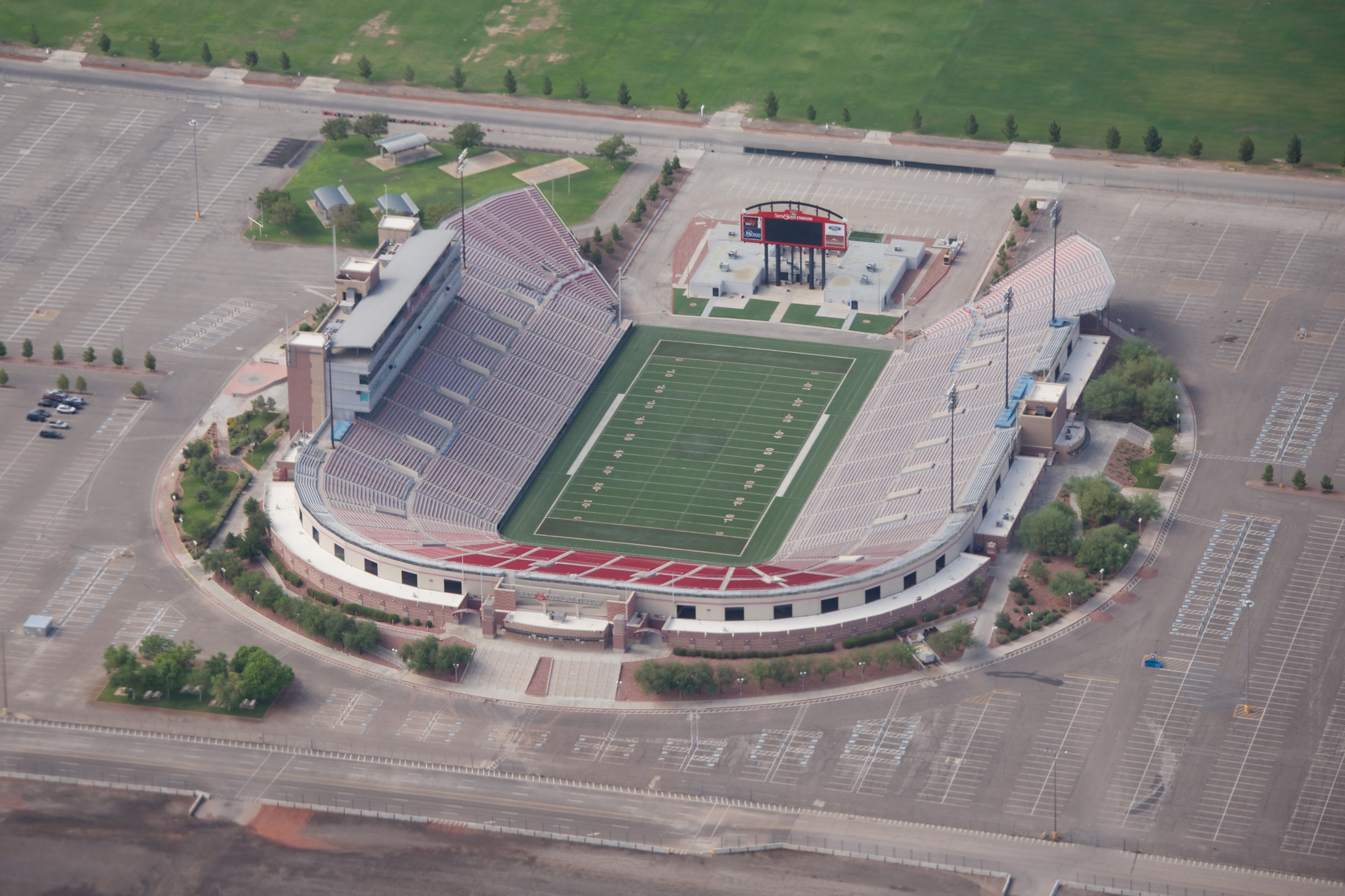
- Sam Boyd Stadium in Whitney, Nevada, hosted the Las Vegas Bowl.
Fresno State Bulldogs	Utah Utes
(8–4)	(8–3)
WAC	Mountain West
16	17
Head coach: Pat Hill	Head coach: Ron McBride
	1	2	3	4	Total
Fresno State	7	0	3	6	16
Utah	7	0	7	3	17
- Date: December 18, 1999
- Season: 1999
- Stadium: Sam Boyd Stadium
- Location: Whitney, Nevada
- MVP: Mike Anderson, Utah
- Referee: Alberto Riveron (C-USA)
- Attendance: 28,227
- Payout: US$750,000 per team

United States TV coverage
- Network: ESPN2
- Announcers: Dave Barnett (Play by Play); Bill Curry (Analyst); Dave Ryan (Sideline)

The 1999 Las Vegas Bowl was the eighth edition of the annual college football bowl game. It featured the Fresno State Bulldogs and the Utah Utes.

== Game summary ==
Fresno State scored first, when Utah placekicker Cletus Truhe had his field goal attempt blocked. It was recovered by Fresno State cornerback Payton Williams and returned 75 yards for a touchdown, to make it 7–0 Fresno State. Running back Mike Anderson scored on a 34-yard touchdown run later in the 1st quarter to tie it at 7. He would finish the game with a Las Vegas Bowl record 254 yards rushing, and the game's MVP award. The second quarter would provide no scoring.

Kicker Jeff Hanna gave Fresno State a 10–7 lead in the third quarter with a 27-yard field goal. Mike Anderson would give the lead back to Utah with a 5-yard touchdown run, making it a 14–10 Utah lead. Fresno State scored in the fourth quarter, on a 2-yard touchdown run by Derrick Ward, but the all-important extra point was blocked, leaving Fresno State with a 16–14 lead. Utah would later win it on a 33-yard Cletus Truhe field goal.
