= Pat Hill =

American football player and coach (born 1951)

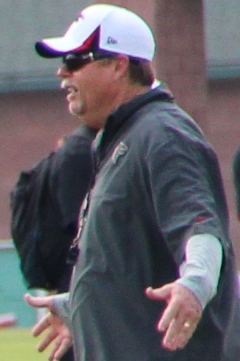
- Hill at Atlanta Falcons training camp in 2013

Personal information
- Born: December 17, 1951 (age 74); Los Angeles, California, U.S.

Career information
- High school: Rim of the World (Lake Arrowhead, California)
- College: UC Riverside

Career history
- Los Angeles Valley (1974–1976) Offensive line coach; Utah (1977–1980) Offensive line coach & recruiting coordinator; UNLV (1981–1982) Offensive coordinator, offensive line coach & recruiting coordinator; Calgary Stampeders (1983) Offensive line coach & recruiting coordinator; Fresno State (1984–1989) Offensive line coach & recruiting coordinator; Arizona (1990) Offensive line coach; Arizona (1991) Offensive coordinator & offensive line coach; Cleveland Browns (1992–1995) Tight ends coach & offensive line coach; Baltimore Ravens (1996) Tight ends coach & offensive line coach; Fresno State (1997–2011) Head coach; Atlanta Falcons (2012–2013) Offensive line coach

Awards and highlights
- WAC champion (1999)

Career coaching statistics
- NCAA overall record: 112–80
- Bowl record: 4–7

Lawrence Patrick Hill (born December 17, 1951) is an American football coach, former player, and broadcaster. He served as the head football coach at Fresno State from 1997 until his dismissal following the 2011 season. In 15 seasons as head coach as Fresno State, he led the Bulldogs to a record of 112–80, 11 bowl game appearances, and a share of the 1999 Western Athletic Conference title.

== Early positions ==
Hill attended Rim of the World High School in Lake Arrowhead, California, graduating in 1970. A 1973 graduate of, and an offensive lineman for the University of California, Riverside, Hill was the offensive line coach at Los Angeles Valley College from 1974 to 1976. In 1977, he became the offensive line coach at the University of Utah, where he would stay through 1980. This was followed by short stints at UNLV in 1981 and 1982, and a one-year stay in the Canadian Football League with the Calgary Stampeders in 1983. After an assistant coaching job at Fresno State, Hill went on to become the offensive coordinator at the University of Arizona from 1990 to 1991. He then went to coach in the National Football League with the Cleveland Browns (under Bill Belichick) and the Baltimore Ravens, where he served as the tight ends and offensive line coach for both teams.

== Fresno State ==
Hill took on the head coaching job at Fresno State in 1997, where he had previously served as the offensive line coach from 1984 to 1989. Coming into the 2005 season, Hill had compiled a 64–38 win–loss record, including a 44–19 Western Athletic Conference mark, one WAC title, and a 10–8 record against BCS AQ conference teams, the most by any BCS non-AQ conference team. Under Hill Fresno State routinely scheduled—and defeated—highly ranked opponents from power conferences. Taking his cue from how Bobby Bowden turned Florida State into a powerhouse, Hill let it be known soon after arriving in Fresno that his Bulldogs would play "anybody, anywhere, anytime."

Hill currently has 18 wins over BCS automatic qualifying conference teams, which is tied for the most wins for any non-automatic qualifier with Utah. In 2001, when Fresno State went 11–3, they reeled off wins over Colorado, #22 Oregon State, and #23 Wisconsin in 3 of their first 4 games. In 2002 they beat #25 Colorado State. In 2004 they beat #13 Kansas State. During his tenure, Hill also went 4–7 in bowl games.

On December 4, 2011, Hill was let go by Fresno State, despite his achievements for such a location.

During his tenure, he coached a number of NFL players including: QB Tom Brandstater, QB David Carr, QB Derek Carr, QB Billy Volek, RB Ryan Mathews, RB Lonyae Miller, RB Michael Pittman, RB Bryson Sumlin, RB Derrick Ward, RB Dwayne Wright, WR Seyi Ajirotutu, WR Bernard Berrian, WR Paul Williams, WR Devon Wylie, TE Bear Pascoe, OT Chris Conrad, OG Logan Mankins, OG Ryan Wendell, LB Orlando Huff, CB Vernon Fox, CB Richard Marshall, CB Will Middleton, S Tyrone Culver, S Cory Hall, S James Sanders, and OT John Fina.

== Atlanta Falcons ==
On January 28, 2012, Hill agreed to be the Atlanta Falcons' offensive line coach. He left the team after the 2013 season.

== Broadcasting career ==
Hill joined 940 ESPN as color commentator for Fresno State football broadcasts effective in the 2015 season.

== Head coaching record ==
Year	Team	Overall	Conference	Standing	Bowl/playoffs	Coaches^{#}	AP^{°}
Fresno State Bulldogs (Western Athletic Conference) (1997–2011)
1997	Fresno State	6–6	5–3	3rd (Pacific)			
1998	Fresno State	5–6	5–3	T–3rd (Pacific)			
1999	Fresno State	8–5	5–2	T–1st	L Las Vegas		
2000	Fresno State	7–5	6–2	3rd	L Silicon Valley		
2001	Fresno State	11–3	6–2	T–2nd	L Silicon Valley		
2002	Fresno State	9–5	6–2	3rd	W Silicon Valley		
2003	Fresno State	9–5	6–2	T–2nd	W Silicon Valley		
2004	Fresno State	9–3	5–3	T–3rd	W MPC Computers	22	22
2005	Fresno State	8–5	6–2	T–3rd	L Liberty		
2006	Fresno State	4–8	4–4	5th			
2007	Fresno State	9–4	6–2	3rd	W Humanitarian		
2008	Fresno State	7–6	4–4	T–5th	L New Mexico		
2009	Fresno State	8–5	6–2	3rd	L New Mexico		
2010	Fresno State	8–5	5–3	4th	L Humanitarian		
2011	Fresno State	4–9	3–4	T–4th			
Fresno State:		112–80	78–40				
Total:		112–80					
National championship Conference title Conference division title or championship game berth
^{#}Rankings from final Coaches Poll.; ^{°}Rankings from final AP Poll.
