= 1992 New England Patriots season =

Season of National Football League team the New England Patriots

- Owner: James Orthwein
- Head coach: Dick MacPherson
- Home stadium: Foxboro Stadium

Results
- Record: 2–14
- Division place: 5th AFC East
- Playoffs: Did not qualify
- All-Pros: None
- Pro Bowlers: TE Marv Cook

Uniform

The 1992 New England Patriots season was the team’s 33rd season overall and 23rd in the National Football League. It was the team’s second year with Dick MacPherson as head coach, but the team had its third owner in the last five seasons. Businessman Victor Kiam, who had purchased the team from its founders, the Sullivan family, in 1988, sold the team to advertising executive and Anheuser-Busch scion James Orthwein in the 1991–92 offseason. Rumours Orthwein planned to move the Patriots from Foxborough were denied.

The Patriots were looking to improve on their 6–10 record from the year before but instead regressed back to a 2–14 record, being affected by serious knee damage to mainstay offensive tackle Bruce Armstrong that caused him to miss the second half of the season. However, an inept running game that did not score a rushing touchdown until the ninth game was the primary cause of the Patriots’ bad record. They finished last in the AFC East and their record tied the Seattle Seahawks for the worst mark in the entire league. However, the Patriots finished in last place in the NFL because of their Week 3 loss to the Seahawks. The Patriots thus received the first pick in the subsequent draft.

Following the season, wholesale changes were made. MacPherson and his staff were fired and Bill Parcells, who had last coached the New York Giants to victory in Super Bowl XXV, was brought in as his replacement. The 1992 team was also the last to play in the colors that the Patriots had played in since their founding, as the team adopted a new logo and a blue, silver, and red color scheme.

After the season, Gene Chilton decided he had played his final NFL game.

== Offseason ==
=== 1992 NFL draft ===
1992 New England Patriots Draft Selections
Round	Overall	Player	Position	College
1	13	Eugene Chung	Offensive Tackle	Virginia Tech
2	35	Rod Smith	Cornerback	Notre Dame
3	64	Todd Collins	Linebacker	Carson–Newman
3	71	Kevin Turner	Running back	Alabama
4	90	Dion Lambert	Cornerback	UCLA
4	93	Darren Anderson	Cornerback	Toledo
5	116	Dwayne Sabb	Linebacker	New Hampshire
6	165	Tracy Boyd	Guard	Elizabeth City State
6	142	Lawrence Hatch	Cornerback	Florida
7	176	Wayne Hawkins	Wide receiver	Southwest Minnesota State
7	194	Jim Gray	Defensive tackle	West Virginia
8	204	Scott Lockwood	Running back	USC
8	205	Sam Gash	Fullback	Penn State
9	232	David Dixon	Guard	Arizona State
10	261	Turner Baur	Tight end	Stanford
10	277	Steve Gordon	Center	California
11	288	Mike Petko	Linebacker	Nebraska
12	333	Freeman Baysinger	Wide receiver	Humboldt State

=== Undrafted free agents ===
1992 undrafted free agents of note
Player	Position	College
Waldy Clark	Cornerback	Boston College
Charles Esty	Guard	St. Lawrence
Al Golden	Tight end	Penn State
Greg Lahr	Tackle	Kentucky
William Price	Safety	Kansas State

== Staff ==
1992 New England Patriots staff
Front office: Chairman of the board – James Orthwein; Vice chairman of the board – Michael O'Hallaron; Chief executive officer – Sam Jankovich; President – Fran Murray; Vice president – Bucko Kilroy; Vice president of administration – Patrick Forte; Vice president of pro personnel and player assistance – Tom Bass; Director of college scouting – Charley Armey; Head coaches: Head coach – Dick MacPherson; Offensive coaches: Offensive coordinator – Dick Coury; Running backs – Bobby Grier; Assistant running backs/assistant wide receivers – Joel Collier; Wide receivers – Ivan Fears; Offensive line – Rod Humenuik	Defensive coaches: Defensive coordinator – Joe Collier; Defensive line – Stan Jones; Assistant defensive line/assistant special teams – Dave Uyrus; Inside linebackers – Norm Gerber; Outside linebackers – Myrel Moore; Defensive backs – Charlie West; Special teams coaches: Special teams/tight ends – Dante Scarnecchia; Strength and conditioning: Strength and conditioning – Ian Pyka

== Roster ==
1992 New England Patriots roster
Quarterbacks (QB): 17 Jeff Carlson; 12 Lee Saltz; Running backs (RB): 33 Sam Gash FB; 40 Scott Lockwood; 44 John Stephens; 34 Kevin Turner FB; 24 Jon Vaughn; Wide receivers (WR): 80 Irving Fryar; 86 Greg McMurtry; 81 Walter Stanley; 83 Michael Timpson; Tight ends (TE): 87 Ben Coates; 85 Marv Cook	Offensive linemen (OL): 74 Scott Bowles T; 63 Gene Chilton C; 69 Eugene Chung T; 66 Steve Gordon C; 77 Pat Harlow T; 68 Calvin Stephens G; 75 Larry Williams G; Defensive linemen (DL): 92 Ray Agnew DE; 98 Tim Edwards DE; 91 Chris Gannon DE; 72 Tim Goad NT; 76 Fred Smerlas NT; 96 Brent Williams DE	Linebackers (LB): 54 Todd Collins ILB; 99 David Howard OLB; 51 Eugene Lockhart ILB; 58 Rob McGovern ILB; 52 Johnny Rembert ILB; 95 Dwayne Sabb OLB; 55 Chris Singleton OLB; 56 Andre Tippett OLB; Defensive backs (DB): 47 Roger Brown FS; 41 Tim Gordon SS; 25 John Granby CB; 36 Jerome Henderson FS; 37 Maurice Hurst CB; 28 Dion Lambert CB; 27 David Pool CB; 48 Randy Robbins S; 22 Rod Smith CB; Special teams (ST): 8 Charlie Baumann K; 11 Shawn McCarthy P; 71 Gregg Rakoczy LS	Practice squad: 46 Al Golden TE; 19 Wayne Hawkins WR; 47 active, 11 inactive, 2 practice squad Reserve: 78 Bruce Armstrong T (IR); 59 Vincent Brown LB (IR); 88 Hart Lee Dykes WR (PUP); 60 Marion Hobby DE (IR); 13 Tommy Hodson QB (IR); 45 Ivy Joe Hunter FB (IR); 7 Hugh Millen QB (IR); 70 Reggie Redding G (IR); 32 Leonard Russell RB (IR); 53 Richard Tardits LB (IR); 16 Scott Zolak QB (IR); Rookies in italics

== Regular season ==
=== Schedule ===
Week	Date	Opponent	Result	Record	Venue	Attendance
1	Bye					
2	September 13	at Los Angeles Rams	**L** 0–14	0–1	Anaheim Stadium	40,402
3	September 20	Seattle Seahawks	**L** 6–10	0–2	Foxboro Stadium	42,327
4	September 27	**Buffalo Bills**	**L** 7–41	0–3	Foxboro Stadium	52,527
5	October 4	at **New York Jets**	**L** 21–30	0–4	Giants Stadium	60,180
6	October 11	San Francisco 49ers	**L** 12–24	0–5	Foxboro Stadium	54,126
7	October 18	at **Miami Dolphins**	**L** 17–38	0–6	Joe Robbie Stadium	57,282
8	October 25	Cleveland Browns	**L** 17–19	0–7	Foxboro Stadium	32,219
9	November 1	at **Buffalo Bills**	**L** 7–16	0–8	Rich Stadium	78,268
10	November 8	New Orleans Saints	**L** 14–31	0–9	Foxboro Stadium	45,413
11	November 15	at **Indianapolis Colts**	**W** 37–34 (OT)	1–9	Hoosier Dome	42,631
12	November 22	**New York Jets**	**W** 24–3	2–9	Foxboro Stadium	27,642
13	November 29	at Atlanta Falcons	**L** 0–34	2–10	Georgia Dome	54,494
14	December 6	**Indianapolis Colts**	**L** 0–6	2–11	Foxboro Stadium	19,429
15	December 13	at Kansas City Chiefs	**L** 20–27	2–12	Arrowhead Stadium	52,208
16	December 20	at Cincinnati Bengals	**L** 10–20	2–13	Riverfront Stadium	45,355
17	December 27	**Miami Dolphins**	**L** 13–16 (OT)	2–14	Foxboro Stadium	34,726
Note: Intra-division opponents are in **bold** text.

=== Standings ===
AFC East
	W	L	T	PCT	DIV	CONF	PF	PA	STK
^{(2)} Miami Dolphins	11	5	0	.688	5–3	9–3	340	281	W3
^{(4)} Buffalo Bills	11	5	0	.688	5–3	7–5	381	283	L1
Indianapolis Colts	9	7	0	.563	5–3	7–7	216	302	W5
New York Jets	4	12	0	.250	3–5	4–8	220	315	L3
New England Patriots	2	14	0	.125	2–6	2–10	205	363	L5

== See also ==
- List of New England Patriots seasons
