= 1991–92 NCAA football bowl games =

College football postseason game series

- Season: 1991
- Regular season: August 28, 1991–December 7, 1991
- Number of bowls: 18
- Bowl games: December 14, 1991 – January 1, 1992
- National Championship: 1992 Rose Bowl; 1992 Orange Bowl
- Location of Championship: Rose Bowl, Pasadena, California and Louisiana Superdome, New Orleans, Louisiana
- Champions: Miami Hurricanes (AP); Washington Huskies (Coaches)
Bowl record by conference
Conference	Bowls	Record	Number of teams in final AP poll
Independents	7	7–0 (1.000)	
SEC	5	2–3 (0.400)	
Big Ten	5	1–3–1 (0.300)	
Pac-10	4	3–1 (0.750)	
ACC	4	1–3 (0.250)	
SWC	4	1–3 (0.250)	
WAC	3	1–1–1 (0.500)	
Big Eight	3	1–2 (0.333)	
MAC	1	1–0 (1.000)	
Big West	1	0–1 (0.000)	

The 1991–92 NCAA football bowl games were a series of post-season games played in December 1991 and January 1992 to end the 1991 NCAA Division I-A football season. A total of 18 team-competitive games, and two all-star games, were played. The post-season began with the California Bowl on December 14, 1991, and concluded on January 18, 1992, with the season-ending Senior Bowl.

== Schedule ==
Date	Game	Site	Time (US EST)	TV	Matchup (pre-game record)	AP pre-game rank	UPI (Coaches) pre-game rank	Source
12/14	California Bowl	Bulldog Stadium; Fresno, California		SportsChannel	Bowling Green 28 (10–1) (MAC Champion), Fresno State 21 (10–1) (Big West Champion)	NR; NR	NR; NR	
12/25	Aloha Bowl	Aloha Stadium; Hālawa, Hawaii		ABC	Georgia Tech 18 (7–5) (ACC), Stanford 17 (8–3) (Pac-10)	NR #17	NR #17	
12/28	Blockbuster Bowl	Joe Robbie Stadium; Miami Gardens, Florida		CBS	Alabama 30 (10–1) (SEC), Colorado 25 (8–2–1) (Big Eight)	#8 #15	#8 #15	
12/29	Gator Bowl	Gator Bowl Stadium; Jacksonville, Florida		TBS	Oklahoma 48 (8–3) (Big Eight), Virginia 14 (8–2–1) (ACC)	#20 #19	#20 #19	
12/29	Independence Bowl	Independence Stadium; Shreveport, Louisiana		ABC	Georgia 24 (8–3) (SEC), Arkansas 15 (6–5) (SWC)	#24; NR	#24; NR	
12/29	Liberty Bowl	Liberty Bowl Memorial Stadium; Memphis, Tennessee		ESPN	Air Force 38 (9–3) (WAC), Mississippi State 15 (7–4) (SEC)	NR; NR	NR; NR	
12/30	Holiday Bowl	Jack Murphy Stadium; San Diego, California		ESPN	Iowa 13 (10–1) (Big Ten), BYU 13 (8–3–1) (WAC Champion)	#7; NR	#7; NR	
12/30	Freedom Bowl	Anaheim Stadium; Anaheim, California		Raycom	Tulsa 28 (9–2) (Independent), San Diego State 17 (8–3–1) (WAC)	#23; NR	#25; NR	
12/31	John Hancock Bowl	Sun Bowl; El Paso, Texas		CBS	UCLA 6 (8–3) (Pac-10), Illinois 3 (6–5) (Big Ten)	#22; NR	#23; NR	
12/31	Copper Bowl	Arizona Stadium; Tucson, Arizona		TBS	Indiana 24 (6–4–1) (Big Ten), Baylor 0 (8–3) (SWC)	NR; NR	NR; NR	
1/1	Peach Bowl	Atlanta–Fulton County Stadium; Atlanta, Georgia	11:30 AM	ESPN	East Carolina 37 (10–1) (Independent), NC State 34 (9–2) (ACC)	#12 #21	#13 #21	
1/1	Hall of Fame Bowl	Tampa Stadium; Tampa, Florida	1:00 PM	NBC	Syracuse 24 (9–2) (Independent), Ohio State 17 (8–3) (Big Ten)	#16 #25	#16 #22	
1/1	Florida Citrus Bowl	Florida Citrus Bowl; Orlando, Florida	1:30 PM	ABC	California 37 (9–2) (Pac-10), Clemson 13 (9–1–1) (ACC Champion)	#14 #13	#14 #12	
1/1	Cotton Bowl Classic	Cotton Bowl; Dallas, Texas	1:30 PM	CBS	Florida State 10 (10–2) (Independent), Texas A&M 2 (10–1) (SWC Champion)	#5 #9	#6 #9	
1/1	Fiesta Bowl	Sun Devil Stadium; Tempe, Arizona	4:30 PM	NBC	Penn State 42 (10–2) (Independent), Tennessee 17 (9–2) (SEC)	#6 #10	#5 #10	
1/1	Rose Bowl	Rose Bowl; Pasadena, California	5:00 PM	ABC	Washington 34 (11–0) (Pac-10 Champion), Michigan 14 (10–1) (Big Ten Champion)	#2 #4	#1 #3	
1/1	Sugar Bowl	Louisiana Superdome; New Orleans, Louisiana	8:30 PM	ABC	Notre Dame 39 (9–3) (Independent), Florida 28 (10–1) (SEC Champion)	#18 #3	#18 #4	
1/1	Orange Bowl	Miami Orange Bowl; Miami, Florida	8:00 PM	NBC	Miami (FL) 22 (11–0) (Big East), Nebraska 0 (9–1–1) (Big Eight Champion)	#1 #11	#2 #11	
