= 1991 Arizona Wildcats football team =

American college football season

1991 Arizona Wildcats football
- Conference: Pacific-10 Conference
- Record: 4–7 (3–5 Pac-10)
- Head coach: Dick Tomey (5th season)
- Offensive coordinator: Pat Hill (1st season)
- Defensive coordinator: Larry Mac Duff (5th season)
- Home stadium: Arizona Stadium

1991 Pacific-10 Conference football standings
	Conf.					Overall
Team	W		L		T	W		L		T
No. 1 Washington $	8	–	0	–	0	12	–	0	–	0
No. 7 California	6	–	2	–	0	10	–	2	–	0
No. 18 UCLA	6	–	2	–	0	9	–	3	–	0
No. 22 Stanford	6	–	2	–	0	8	–	4	–	0
Arizona State	4	–	4	–	0	6	–	5	–	0
Arizona	3	–	5	–	0	4	–	7	–	0
Washington State	3	–	5	–	0	4	–	7	–	0
USC	2	–	6	–	0	3	–	8	–	0
Oregon	1	–	7	–	0	3	–	8	–	0
Oregon State	1	–	7	–	0	1	–	10	–	0
$ – Conference champion; Rankings from Coaches Poll

The 1991 Arizona Wildcats football team represented the University of Arizona in the Pacific-10 Conference (Pac-10) during the 1991 NCAA Division I-A football season. In their fifth season under head coach Dick Tomey, the Wildcats compiled a 4–7 record (3–5 against Pac-10 opponents), finished in a tie for sixth place in the Pac-10, and were outscored by their opponents, 361 to 248. The team played its home games in Arizona Stadium in Tucson, Arizona.

The team's statistical leaders included George Malauulu with 674 passing yards, Billy Johnson with 682 rushing yards, and Chuck Levy with 289 receiving yards. Safety Tony Bouie led the team with 86 tackles.

Arizona’s season was mostly affected by a difficult schedule, along with injuries on the offense and inexperienced freshmen, as most of the starters from the 1990 team graduated. Also, the Wildcats lost to rival Arizona State for the first time in the Tomey era.

== Schedule ==
Date	Time	Opponent	Site	TV	Result	Attendance	Source
September 7	9:30 a.m.	at No. 22 Ohio State*	Ohio Stadium; Columbus, OH	ABC	L 14–38	92,743	
September 14	4:00 p.m.	Stanford	Arizona Stadium; Tucson, AZ	Prime	W 28–23	43,055	
September 21	7:00 p.m.	No. 24 California	Arizona Stadium; Tucson, AZ	Prime	L 21–23	46,715	
September 28	7:00 p.m.	Long Beach State*	Arizona Stadium; Tucson, AZ	KTTU	W 45–21	46,334	
October 5	1:00 p.m.	at No. 3 Washington	Husky Stadium; Seattle, WA	Prime	L 0–54	72,495	
October 12	3:30 p.m.	at UCLA	Rose Bowl; Pasadena, CA	Prime	L 14–54	45,944	
October 26	7:00 p.m.	No. 2 Miami (FL)*	Arizona Stadium; Tucson, AZ	KTTU	L 9–36	53,349	
November 2	4:00 p.m.	Oregon State^{†}	Arizona Stadium; Tucson, AZ	KTTU	W 45–21	42,082	
November 9	8:30 p.m.	at Washington State	Martin Stadium; Pullman, WA	Prime	L 27–40	21,520	
November 16	7:30 p.m.	USC	Arizona Stadium; Tucson, AZ	Prime	W 31–14	41,053	
November 23	7:30 p.m.	at Arizona State	Sun Devil Stadium; Tempe, AZ (Duel in the Desert)	Prime	L 14–37	73,427	
*Non-conference game; ^{†}Homecoming; Rankings from AP Poll released prior to the game; All times are in Mountain time; Source:

== Game summaries ==
=== Ohio State ===
Arizona began the season on the road against Ohio State. It was only the second meeting between the Wildcats and Buckeyes, with the first one occurring in 1967, when Arizona upset legendary Ohio State coach Woody Hayes and the Buckeyes. This time, the Buckeyes came out and dominated a rebuilding Wildcat squad (the head coach of Ohio State was John Cooper, who went 0–2–1 against the Wildcats as Arizona State coach from 1985 to 1987 prior to being hired by the Buckeyes).

=== Washington ===
In Arizona’s second consecutive visit to Washington, the Wildcats would end up getting humiliated by the Huskies, who then went on to share the national championship.

=== Miami (FL) ===
The Wildcats hosted second-ranked Miami in a rare October non-conference game. The Hurricanes would outplay an inexperienced Arizona team on its way to a dominant win. The Wildcats’ offense was riddled with injuries and used mostly reserved players as starters, whose lack of experience was a factor in the loss.

Due to Miami being favored to win big and the game unlikely to be competitive, as well as a late game kickoff, cable and national networks turned down the offer to air the game, which led to it being picked up by local broadcasters in the Miami and Tucson markets.

=== USC ===
In their home finale, the Wildcats hosted USC. Arizona came out hot on both sides of the ball and easily defeated the Trojans. It was the Wildcats’ first home win over USC in their history, as their other wins against the Trojans came on the road. The USC coach, Larry Smith (the previous Arizona coach at the time), lost in Tucson as the opposing coach for the first time.

=== Arizona State ===
The Wildcats visited Tempe for the season finale against Arizona State. Arizona would play poorly all night and ASU scored enough to finally ended the Wildcats’ streak of dominance in the rivalry. It was ASU’s first win over Arizona since 1981 (despite a tie in 1987).

A positive moment for the Wildcats occurred late in the game, when they blocked an ASU punt and returned it for a touchdown, which gave them some points. Arizona ended the season with four wins, which snapped a three-year streak of winning records.

== Season notes ==
- The season was declared a rebuilding one, according to Tomey. That, as well as a tough schedule (which included four games against ranked opponents) and a young offense, all of which led to the Wildcats’ 4–7 record.
- Arizona’s offense, under new OC Pat Hill, struggled at times during this season without Scherer in charge, and led to the team’s 4–7 record.
- Two of Arizona’s wins (against Long Beach State and Oregon State) had identical final scores (45–21).
- The three-game losing streak that the Wildcats suffered in the middle of the season (blowout losses to UCLA, Washington, and Miami) essentially sealed their season’s fate and ended all chances of a bowl game.
- Arizona defeated USC for the second consecutive season, as they won in 1990. The Wildcats would only repeat this only once since then (1999–2000, in Tomey’s final years as coach). Also, this season would be the last time in which Tomey would defeat his predecessor.
- The Wildcats four wins were the lowest since 1987, which was Tomey’s first year when Arizona also won four games.
- After losing to Arizona State, the Wildcats would continue their dominance over them for the rest of the decade until Tomey left in 2000.
- Although the defense played below-average this season, they would improve and become dominant in 1992 and would become the nation’s best through the early part of the 1990s.

== After the season ==
=== NFL draft ===
The following Wildcats were selected in the 1992 NFL draft after the season.

Round	Pick	Player	Position	NFL team
1	27	John Fina	Tackle	Buffalo Bills
6	150	Michael Bates	Wide receiver	Seattle Seahawks
