= 1991 Washington State Cougars football team =

American college football season

1991 Washington State Cougars football
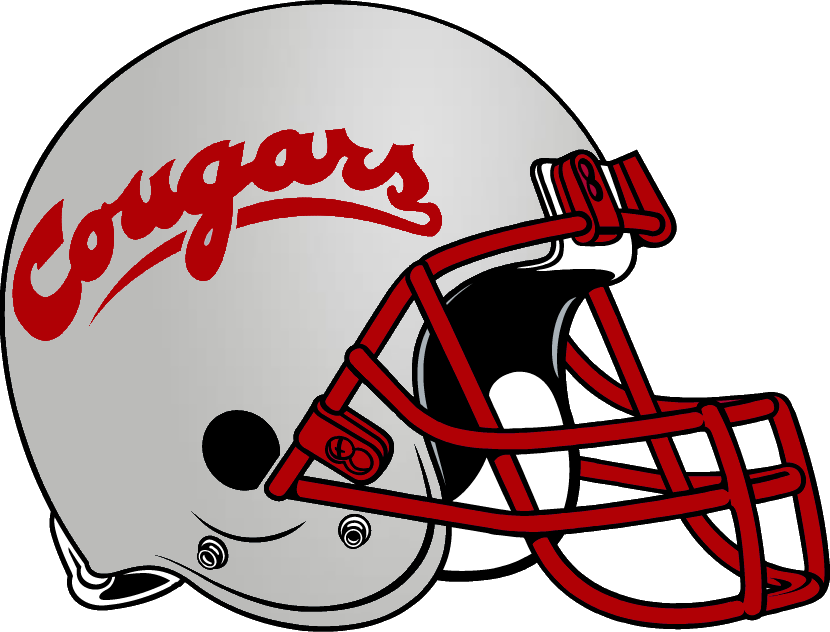
- Conference: Pacific-10 Conference
- Record: 4–7 (3–5 Pac-10)
- Head coach: Mike Price (3rd season)
- Offensive coordinator: Tim Lappano (1st season)
- Offensive scheme: Spread
- Defensive coordinator: Mike Zimmer (3rd season)
- Base defense: 4–3
- Home stadium: Martin Stadium

1991 Pacific-10 Conference football standings
| | Conf. | | | | | Overall |
| Team | W | | L | | T | W | | L | | T |
|---|---|---|---|---|---|---|---|---|---|---|
| No. 1 Washington $ | 8 | – | 0 | – | 0 | 12 | – | 0 | – | 0 |
| No. 7 California | 6 | – | 2 | – | 0 | 10 | – | 2 | – | 0 |
| No. 18 UCLA | 6 | – | 2 | – | 0 | 9 | – | 3 | – | 0 |
| No. 22 Stanford | 6 | – | 2 | – | 0 | 8 | – | 4 | – | 0 |
| Arizona State | 4 | – | 4 | – | 0 | 6 | – | 5 | – | 0 |
| Arizona | 3 | – | 5 | – | 0 | 4 | – | 7 | – | 0 |
| Washington State | 3 | – | 5 | – | 0 | 4 | – | 7 | – | 0 |
| USC | 2 | – | 6 | – | 0 | 3 | – | 8 | – | 0 |
| Oregon | 1 | – | 7 | – | 0 | 3 | – | 8 | – | 0 |
| Oregon State | 1 | – | 7 | – | 0 | 1 | – | 10 | – | 0 |
$ – Conference champion; Rankings from Coaches Poll

The 1991 Washington State Cougars football team was an American football team that represented Washington State University in the Pacific-10 Conference (Pac-10) during the 1991 NCAA Division I-A football season. In their third season under head coach Mike Price, the Cougars compiled a 4–7 record (3–5 in Pac-10, tied for sixth), and were outscored by their opponents 340 to 280.

The team's statistical leaders included Drew Bledsoe with 2,741 passing yards, Shaumbe Wright-Fair with 843 rushing yards, and Phillip Bobo with 759 receiving yards.

== Schedule ==
| Date | Opponent | Site | Result | Attendance | Source |
|---|---|---|---|---|---|
| September 7 | at Oregon | Autzen Stadium; Eugene, OR | L 14–40 | 42,995 | |
| September 14 | Fresno State* | Martin Stadium; Pullman, WA | L 30–34 | 20,647 | |
| September 21 | at No. 16 Ohio State* | Ohio Stadium; Columbus, OH | L 19–33 | 92,687 | |
| September 28 | at UNLV* | Sam Boyd Silver Bowl; Las Vegas, NV | W 40–13 | 20,628 | |
| October 5 | Oregon State^{†} | Martin Stadium; Pullman, WA | W 55–7 | 25,100 | |
| October 12 | USC | Martin Stadium; Pullman, WA | L 27–34 | 23,997 | |
| October 19 | at No. 25 Arizona State | Sun Devil Stadium; Tempe, AZ | W 17–3 | 48,682 | |
| November 2 | at No. 23 UCLA | Rose Bowl; Pasadena, CA | L 3–44 | 43,592 | |
| November 9 | Arizona | Martin Stadium; Pullman, WA | W 40–27 | 21,520 | |
| November 16 | No. 22 Stanford | Martin Stadium; Pullman, WA | L 14–49 | 18,238 | |
| November 23 | at No. 2 Washington | Husky Stadium; Seattle, WA (Apple Cup) | L 21–56 | 72,581 | |
*Non-conference game; ^{†}Homecoming; Rankings from AP Poll released prior to the game

== Roster ==
1991 Washington State Cougars football team roster
Players
Coaches
Offense

| Pos. | # | Name | Class |
|---|---|---|---|
| QB | 11 | Drew Bledsoe | So |
| WR | 2 | Phillip Bobo | So |
| TE | 89 | Brett Carolan | So |
| RB | 34 | Paul Carr | Sr |
| WR | 1 | C. J. Davis | Jr |
| G | 61 | Josh Dunning | So |
| OT | 72 | Jim Eucker | Jr |
| OT | 74 | Bob Garman | Sr |
| OL | 64 | Ron Lewis | So |
| G | 68 | Marc McCloskey | Fr |
| WR | 25 | Augustin Oloiba | Sr |
| QB | 13 | Mike Pattinson | So |
| G | 77 | Konrad Pimiskern | Jr |
| WR | 9 | Deron Pointer | So |
| WR | 6 | Calvin Schexnayder | Jr |
| OT | 78 | Andy Tribble | Jr |
| C | 66 | Robbie Tobeck | Jr |
| TE | 98 | Clarence Williams | Jr |
| C | 76 | Steve Wolfe | Jr |
| RB | 32 | Shaumbe Wright-Fair | Jr |

Defense

| Pos. | # | Name | Class |
|---|---|---|---|
| LB | 57 | Kevin Ashworth | Jr |
| LB | 48 | Lewis Bush | Jr |
| DT | 97 | Chris Frank | Jr |
| DE | 92 | Ray Hall | So |
| CB | 24 | Torey Hunter | Fr |
| LB | 19 | Kurt Loertscher | Sr |
| LB | 41 | Anthony McClanahan | So |
| SS | 8 | Singor Mobley | Fr |
| DE | 86 | DeWayne Patterson | Fr |
| SS | 28 | Anthony Prior | Sr |
| FS | 10 | John Rushing | Fr |
| DE | 83 | Lee Tilleman | Sr |
| DT | 94 | Kirk Westerfield | Sr |
| CB | 20 | Michael Wright | Sr |

Special teams

| Pos. | # | Name | Class |
|---|---|---|---|
| PK, P | 4 | Jason Hanson | Sr |

Head coach

- Mike Price

Coordinators/assistant coaches

- Tim Lappano – OC
- Mike Zimmer – DC
- Bill Doba – LB

Legend

- (C) Team captain
- (S) Suspended
- (I) Ineligible
- Injured
- Redshirt

== NFL draft ==
Four Cougars were selected in the 1992 NFL draft.

| Player | Position | Round | Overall | Franchise |
|---|---|---|---|---|
| Jason Hanson | PK | 2 | 56 | Detroit Lions |
| Michael Wright | CB | 5 | 126 | New York Giants |
| Anthony Prior | S | 9 | 238 | New York Giants |
| Augustin Oloiba | WR | 11 | 289 | Cleveland Browns |
