= 1991 Oregon Ducks football team =

American college football season

1991 Oregon Ducks football
- Conference: Pacific-10 Conference
- Record: 3–8 (1–7 Pac-10)
- Head coach: Rich Brooks (15th season)
- Offensive coordinator: Mike Bellotti (3rd season)
- Offensive scheme: Pro-style
- Defensive coordinator: Denny Schuler (6th season)
- Base defense: 5–2
- Captains: Jeff Thomason; Joe Farwell
- Home stadium: Autzen Stadium

1991 Pacific-10 Conference football standings
| | Conf. | | | | | Overall |
| Team | W | | L | | T | W | | L | | T |
|---|---|---|---|---|---|---|---|---|---|---|
| No. 1 Washington $ | 8 | – | 0 | – | 0 | 12 | – | 0 | – | 0 |
| No. 7 California | 6 | – | 2 | – | 0 | 10 | – | 2 | – | 0 |
| No. 18 UCLA | 6 | – | 2 | – | 0 | 9 | – | 3 | – | 0 |
| No. 22 Stanford | 6 | – | 2 | – | 0 | 8 | – | 4 | – | 0 |
| Arizona State | 4 | – | 4 | – | 0 | 6 | – | 5 | – | 0 |
| Arizona | 3 | – | 5 | – | 0 | 4 | – | 7 | – | 0 |
| Washington State | 3 | – | 5 | – | 0 | 4 | – | 7 | – | 0 |
| USC | 2 | – | 6 | – | 0 | 3 | – | 8 | – | 0 |
| Oregon | 1 | – | 7 | – | 0 | 3 | – | 8 | – | 0 |
| Oregon State | 1 | – | 7 | – | 0 | 1 | – | 10 | – | 0 |
$ – Conference champion; Rankings from Coaches Poll

The 1991 Oregon Ducks football team represented the University of Oregon during the 1991 NCAA Division I-A football season. They were led by head coach Rich Brooks, who was in his 15th season as head coach of the Ducks. They played their home games at Autzen Stadium in Eugene, Oregon and participated as members of the Pacific-10 Conference.

== Schedule ==
| Date | Time | Opponent | Site | TV | Result | Attendance | Source |
|---|---|---|---|---|---|---|---|
| September 7 | 3:30 pm | Washington State | Autzen Stadium; Eugene, OR | Prime | W 40–14 | 42,995 | |
| September 14 | 5:00 pm | at Texas Tech* | Jones Stadium; Lubbock, TX | Prime | W 28–13 | 36,308 | |
| September 21 | 6:00 pm | at Utah* | Robert Rice Stadium; Salt Lake City, UT | OSN | L 21–24 | 27,867 | |
| September 28 | 8:00 pm | USC | Autzen Stadium; Eugene, OR (rivalry) | ESPN | L 14–30 | 45,948 | |
| October 5 | 1:00 pm | New Mexico State* | Autzen Stadium; Eugene, OR | | W 29–6 | 34,536 | |
| October 12 | 12:30 pm | at No. 13 California | California Memorial Stadium; Berkeley, CA | ABC | L 7–45 | 46,000 | |
| October 26 | 12:30 pm | at No. 3 Washington | Husky Stadium; Seattle, WA (rivalry) | Prime | L 7–29 | 72,318 | |
| November 2 | 1:00 pm | Stanford^{†} | Autzen Stadium; Eugene, OR (rivalry) | | L 13–33 | 41,949 | |
| November 9 | 6:00 pm | at Arizona State | Sun Devil Stadium; Tempe, AZ | OSN | L 21–24 | 48,170 | |
| November 16 | 12:30 pm | at UCLA | Rose Bowl; Pasadena, CA | ABC | L 7–16 | 40,823 | |
| November 23 | 1:00 pm | Oregon State | Autzen Stadium; Eugene, OR (Civil War) | Prime | L 3–14 | 42,141 | |
*Non-conference game; ^{†}Homecoming; Rankings from AP Poll released prior to the game; All times are in Pacific time; Source:

== Game summaries ==
=== Oregon State ===
Oregon State Beavers (0–10) at Oregon Ducks

| Quarter | 1 | 2 | 3 | 4 | Total |
|---|---|---|---|---|---|
| Oregon St | 0 | 7 | 0 | 7 | 14 |
| Oregon | 3 | 0 | 0 | 0 | 3 |

at Autzen Stadium, Eugene, Oregon

- Date: November 23, 1991

Game information

First quarter

- ORE – Gregg McCallum 37-yard field goal, 5:23. Oregon 3–0. Drive: 3 plays, —3 yards.

Second quarter

- OSU – Ian Shields 6-yard run (Jamie Burke kick), 1:50. Oregon St 7–3. Drive: 7 plays, 64 yards.

Fourth quarter

- OSU – Maurice Wilson 20-yard pass from Chad Paulson (Jamie Burke kick), 10:32. Oregon St 14–3. Drive: 7 plays, 48 yards.

Top passers

- OSU – Chad Paulson – 1/1, 20 yards, TD
- ORE – Brett Salisbury – 5/20, 65 yards, INT

Top rushers

- OSU – Chad Paulson – 21 rushes, 149 yards
- ORE – Donovan Moore – 11 rushes, 48 yards

Top receivers

- OSU – Maurice Wilson – 2 receptions, 29 yards, TD
- ORE – Juan Shedrick – 2 receptions, 34 yards

== Roster ==
1991 Oregon Ducks football team roster
Players
Coaches
Offense

| Pos. | # | Name | Class |
|---|---|---|---|
| RB | | Sean Burwell |
| RB | | Donovan Moore |
| QB | | Danny O'Neil |
| QB | | Brett Salisbury |
| RB | | Juan Shedrick |

Defense

| Pos. | # | Name | Class |

Special teams

| Pos. | # | Name | Class |
|---|---|---|---|
| K | | Gregg McCallum |

Head coach

- Rich Brooks

Coordinators/assistant coaches

Legend

- (C) Team captain
- (S) Suspended
- (I) Ineligible
- Injured
- Redshirt
