= 1991 Oregon State Beavers football team =

American college football season

1991 Oregon State Beavers football
- Conference: Pacific-10 Conference
- Record: 1–10 (1–7 Pac-10)
- Head coach: Jerry Pettibone (1st season)
- Offensive coordinator: Mike Summers (1st season)
- Offensive scheme: Multiple
- Defensive coordinator: Rocky Long (1st season)
- Base defense: 3–3–5
- Home stadium: Parker Stadium

1991 Pacific-10 Conference football standings
	Conf.					Overall
Team	W		L		T	W		L		T
No. 1 Washington $	8	–	0	–	0	12	–	0	–	0
No. 7 California	6	–	2	–	0	10	–	2	–	0
No. 18 UCLA	6	–	2	–	0	9	–	3	–	0
No. 22 Stanford	6	–	2	–	0	8	–	4	–	0
Arizona State	4	–	4	–	0	6	–	5	–	0
Arizona	3	–	5	–	0	4	–	7	–	0
Washington State	3	–	5	–	0	4	–	7	–	0
USC	2	–	6	–	0	3	–	8	–	0
Oregon	1	–	7	–	0	3	–	8	–	0
Oregon State	1	–	7	–	0	1	–	10	–	0
$ – Conference champion; Rankings from Coaches Poll

The 1991 Oregon State Beavers football team represented Oregon State University in the 1991 NCAA Division I-A football season. The Beavers had one win and ten losses for their twentieth consecutive losing season. They scored 125 and allowed 365 points. The team was led by first-year head coach Jerry Pettibone, previously the head coach for six seasons at Northern Illinois.

The sole victory came in the season finale, a road upset over rival Oregon in the Civil War.

== Schedule ==
Date	Time	Opponent	Site	TV	Result	Attendance	Source
September 7	1:00 pm	Utah*	Parker Stadium; Corvallis, OR		L 10–22	25,812	
September 14	7:00 pm	at UNLV*	Sam Boyd Silver Bowl; Whitney, NV		L 9–23	19,141	
September 21	5:00 pm	Fresno State*	Parker Stadium; Corvallis, OR		L 20–24	22,047	
October 5	2:00 pm	at Washington State	Martin Stadium; Pullman, WA		L 7–55	25,100	
October 12	1:00 pm	Arizona State	Parker Stadium; Corvallis, OR		L 7–24	23,833	
October 19	7:00 pm	UCLA	Parker Stadium; Corvallis, OR	PSN	L 7–44	25,734	
October 26	12:30 pm	at Stanford	Stanford Stadium; Stanford, CA		L 20–40	21,416	
November 2	6:00 pm	at Arizona	Arizona Stadium; Tucson, AZ		L 21–45	42,082	
November 9	1:00 pm	No. 7 California	Parker Stadium; Corvallis, OR		L 14–27	20,798	
November 16	1:00 pm	No. 3 Washington	Parker Stadium; Corvallis, OR		L 6–58	31,588	
November 23	1:00 pm	at Oregon	Autzen Stadium; Eugene, Oregon (Civil War)		W 14–3	42,141	
*Non-conference game; Rankings from AP Poll released prior to the game; All times are in Pacific time; Source:

== Personnel ==
1991 Oregon State Beavers football team roster
Players
Coaches
Offense

Pos.	#	Name	Class
LT		Tim Camp	Fr
RB		Chad Paulson	So
QB		Ian Shields	So
WR		Maurice Wilson

Defense

Pos.	#	Name	Class
LB		Todd Sahlfeld	Sr

Special teams

Pos.	#	Name	Class
K		Jamie Burke

Head coach

- Jerry Pettibone

Coordinators/assistant coaches

Legend

- (C) Team captain
- (S) Suspended
- (I) Ineligible
- Injured
- Redshirt

== Season summary ==
=== Oregon ===
Oregon State Beavers at Oregon Ducks – Game summary

Quarter	1	2	3	4	Total
Beavers	0	7	0	7	14
Ducks	3	0	0	0	3

at Autzen Stadium, Eugene, Oregon

- Date: November 23
- Game time: 1:00 p.m. PST
- Game attendance: 42,141
- Eugene Register-Guard, 24 Nov 1991.

Game information

First quarter

- ORE – Gregg McCallum 37-yard field goal, 5:23. Oregon 3–0. Drive: 3 plays, —3 yards.

Second quarter

- OSU – Ian Shields 6-yard run (Jamie Burke kick), 1:50. Oregon St 7–3. Drive: 7 plays, 64 yards.

Fourth quarter

- OSU – Maurice Wilson 20-yard pass from Chad Paulson (Jamie Burke kick), 10:32. Oregon St 14–3. Drive: 7 plays, 48 yards.

Top passers

- OSU – Chad Paulson – 1/1, 20 yards, TD
- ORE – Brett Salisbury – 5/20, 65 yards, INT

Top rushers

- OSU – Chad Paulson – 21 rushes, 149 yards
- ORE – Donovan Moore – 11 rushes, 48 yards

Top receivers

- OSU – Maurice Wilson – 2 receptions, 29 yards, TD
- ORE – Juan Shedrick – 2 receptions, 34 yards

Oregon State carried its seniors off the field, a motivational ploy practiced by head coach Jerry Pettibone during the week.
