= 1991 UCLA Bruins football team =

American college football season

1991 UCLA Bruins football

John Hancock Bowl champion

John Hancock Bowl, W 6–3 vs. Illinois
- Conference: Pacific-10 Conference

Ranking
- Coaches: No. 18
- AP: No. 19
- Record: 9–3 (6–2 Pac-10)
- Head coach: Terry Donahue (16th season)
- Offensive coordinator: Homer Smith (11th season)
- Defensive coordinator: Bob Field (10th season)
- Captains: Matt Darby; Tommy Maddox; Dion Lambert; Scott Spalding
- Home stadium: Rose Bowl

1991 Pacific-10 Conference football standings
	Conf.					Overall
Team	W		L		T	W		L		T
No. 1 Washington $	8	–	0	–	0	12	–	0	–	0
No. 7 California	6	–	2	–	0	10	–	2	–	0
No. 18 UCLA	6	–	2	–	0	9	–	3	–	0
No. 22 Stanford	6	–	2	–	0	8	–	4	–	0
Arizona State	4	–	4	–	0	6	–	5	–	0
Arizona	3	–	5	–	0	4	–	7	–	0
Washington State	3	–	5	–	0	4	–	7	–	0
USC	2	–	6	–	0	3	–	8	–	0
Oregon	1	–	7	–	0	3	–	8	–	0
Oregon State	1	–	7	–	0	1	–	10	–	0
$ – Conference champion; Rankings from Coaches Poll

The 1991 UCLA Bruins football team represented the University of California, Los Angeles (UCLA) as a member of the Pacific-10 Conference (Pac-10) during the 1991 NCAA Division I-A football season. Led by 16th-year head coach Terry Donahue, the Bruins compiled an overall record of 9–3 with a mark of 6–2 in conference play, placing in a three-way tie for second in the Pac-10. UCLA was invited to the John Hancock Bowl, where the Bruins defeated Illinois. The team played home games at the Rose Bowl in Pasadena, California.

The Bruins offense scored 323 points while the defense allowed 190 points.

== Schedule ==
Date	Time	Opponent	Rank	Site	TV	Result	Attendance	Source
September 7	7:00 pm	No. 25 BYU*	No. 23	Rose Bowl; Pasadena, CA		W 27–23	61,542	
September 14	9:30 am	at No. 11 Tennessee*	No. 21	Neyland Stadium; Knoxville, TN	TBS	L 16–30	97,117	
September 26	5:00 pm	at San Diego State*		Jack Murphy Stadium; San Diego, CA	ESPN	W 37–12	37,333	
October 5	12:30 pm	No. 18 California	No. 24	Rose Bowl; Pasadena, CA (rivalry)	ABC	L 24–27	53,859	
October 12	3:30 pm	Arizona		Rose Bowl; Pasadena, CA	Prime	W 54–14	45,944	
October 19	7:00 pm	at Oregon State		Parker Stadium; Corvallis, OR	Prime	W 44–7	25,734	
October 26	12:30 pm	at Arizona State		Sun Devil Stadium; Tempe, AZ	ABC	W 21–16	46,872	
November 2	3:30 pm	Washington State^{†}	No. 23	Rose Bowl; Pasadena, CA	Prime	W 44–3	43,592	
November 9	3:30 pm	at Stanford	No. 22	Stanford Stadium; Stanford, CA (rivalry)	Prime	L 10–27	55,178	
November 16	12:30 pm	Oregon		Rose Bowl; Pasadena, CA	ABC	W 16–7	40,823	
November 23	12:30 pm	at USC	No. 25	Los Angeles Memorial Coliseum; Los Angeles, CA (Victory Bell)	Prime	W 24–21	84,623	
December 31	11:30 am	vs. Illinois*	No. 22	Sun Bowl; El Paso, TX (John Hancock Bowl)	CBS	W 6–3	42,281	
*Non-conference game; ^{†}Homecoming; Rankings from AP Poll released prior to the game; All times are in Pacific time; Source:

== Roster ==
1991 UCLA Bruins football team roster
Players
Coaches
Offense

Pos.	#	Name	Class
QB		Wayne Cook	So
QB	8	Tommy Maddox
WR	2	Scott Miller
WR	88	Sean LaChapelle

Defense

Pos.	#	Name	Class
LB		Arnold Ale
DB	43	Matt Darby
CB	26	Dion Lambert

Special teams

Pos.	#	Name	Class

Head coach

- Terry Donahue

Coordinators/assistant coaches

Legend

- (C) Team captain
- (S) Suspended
- (I) Ineligible
- Injured
- Redshirt

== Awards and honors ==
- All-Americans: Matt Darby (S), Sean LaChapelle (WR, second team), Carlton Gray (CB, third team)
- All-Conference First Team: Matt Darby (S), Sean LaChapelle (WR), Vaughn Parker (OT)

== 1991 team players in the NFL ==
The following players were claimed in the 1992 NFL draft.

Player	Position	Round	Pick	NFL club
Tommy Maddox	Quarterback	1	25	Denver Broncos
Dion Lambert	Defensive back	4	90	New England Patriots
Maury Toy	Running back	5	113	Indianapolis Colts
Matt Darby	Defensive back	5	139	Buffalo Bills
James Malone	Linebacker	6	148	Tampa Bay Buccaneers
Kevin Smith	Tight end	7	185	Los Angeles Raiders
