= 1991 Aloha Bowl =

American college football game

1991 Jeep Eagle Aloha Bowl
Georgia Tech Yellow Jackets	Stanford Cardinal
(7–5)	(8–3)
18	17
Head coach: Bobby Ross	Head coach: Dennis Green
	AP / Coaches; 17 / 17
	1	2	3	4	Total
Georgia Tech	10	0	0	8	18
Stanford	7	10	0	0	17
- Date: December 25, 1991
- Season: 1991
- Stadium: Aloha Stadium
- Location: Honolulu, Hawaii
- MVP: Shawn Jones (QB), Georgia Tech; Tommy Vardell (RB), Stanford
- Attendance: 34,433

United States TV coverage
- Network: ABC
- Announcers: Keith Jackson, Bob Griese, and Jack Arute

The 1991 Aloha Bowl (December) was a post-season college football bowl game between the Stanford Cardinal and the Georgia Tech Yellow Jackets played on December 25, 1991, at Aloha Stadium in Honolulu, Hawaii. It was the tenth edition of the bowl game.

After trailing for most of the game, with just over a minute to play, Georgia Tech's Willie Clay returned a punt 63 yards to the Stanford 31. Quarterback Shawn Jones scored on a one-yard touchdown plunge with 14 seconds remaining whereupon the Yellow Jackets completed a 2-point conversion to take an 18–17 victory.

== Teams ==
=== Georgia Tech Yellow Jackets ===
After being named national champion by the Coaches' Poll in the previous season, Georgia Tech was coming off an uneven season, and a disappointing loss to rival Georgia. The team was led by its defense, including linebacker Marco Coleman, defensive back Willie Clay (who also returned punts), and lineman Coleman Rudolph.

=== Stanford Cardinal ===
Stanford started the season 1–3 before recovering to win the last seven games of the season, including a Big Game win over rival and #6 ranked California. The Cardinal offense was led by "Touchdown" Tommy Vardell, who had rushed for 1,084 yards and 20 touchdowns during the season, and quarterback Steve Stenstrom, who led the Pac-10 in passing.

== Game summary ==
Stanford took the opening kickoff and drove 48 yards on six plays, with Vardell scoring from six yards out. The Yellow Jackets answered with a touchdown drive of their own, 60 yards in 10 plays, tying the game on a two-yard pass from quarterback Shawn Jones to Michael Smith. Georgia Tech got on the board again as time expired in the first quarter with a 24-yard Scott Sisson field goal.

In the second quarter, the Cardinal tied the game on a 38-yard Aaron Mills field goal, and then took the lead on another Vardell run, this one for two yards. In addition to the two touchdowns, Vardell rushed for 104 yards on the day and was named Stanford's MVP of the game.

Stanford held the lead through the third quarter, but the Yellow Jackets had a huge scoring opportunity when Cardinal punter Paul Stonehouse fumbled a low snap at the Stanford 18 yard line. Georgia Tech drove to the Stanford one-yard line, but Rodney Williams fumbled, and Stanford linebacker Tom Williams recovered the ball to keep Stanford's lead into the final quarter.

As time ran down in the fourth quarter, Stanford still had a 7-point lead but was forced to punt with 1:41 left. Georgia Tech's Clay fielded the punt at his own six-yard line and made the play of the game: he returned the punt 63 yards to the Stanford 31. From there, the Yellow Jackets drove to the Stanford goal line and scored on a one-yard rush from Jones (who was named Georgia Tech's game MVP) to make the score 17–16 with 14 seconds left in the game. Instead of opting for a tie, Tech head coach Bobby Ross called for the two-point conversion and sent Jimy Lincoln over the right end to give Georgia Tech the victory.

=== Scoring ===
==== First quarter ====
- Stanford - Tommy Vardell 6-yard run (Aaron Mills kick)
- Georgia Tech - Michael Smith 2-yard pass from Shawn Jones (Scott Sisson kick)
- Georgia Tech - Sisson 24-yard field goal

==== Second quarter ====
- Stanford - Mills 38-yard field goal
- Stanford - Vardell 2-yard run (Mills kick)

==== Third quarter ====
- No scoring.

==== Fourth quarter ====
- Georgia Tech - Jones 1-yard run (Jimy Lincoln run)
- Georgia Tech - Griggs 28-yard punt return (Michael Bennet)

== Aftermath ==
Following this game, both head coaches left for head coaching jobs in the NFL: Dennis Green was named head coach of the Minnesota Vikings and Bobby Ross took the head coaching job for the San Diego Chargers.

Stanford hired Bill Walsh to replace Green the next season, and primarily on the strength of Green's recruits, including quarterback Stenstrom, won the Blockbuster Bowl and ended the season with a #9 ranking. Stenstrom would play five NFL seasons; Vardell was picked ninth in the 1992 NFL draft by the Cleveland Browns and played eight NFL seasons.

Georgia Tech hired Bill Lewis as its next coach; he was fired in his third season after failing to have a winning record in all three seasons. Quarterback Jones had a short NFL career; linebacker Coleman had a fourteen-year career in the NFL.
