= 1991 USC Trojans football team =

American college football season

1991 USC Trojans football
- Conference: Pacific-10 Conference
- Record: 3–8 (2–6 Pac-10)
- Head coach: Larry Smith (5th season)
- Captain: Matt Gee
- Home stadium: Los Angeles Memorial Coliseum

1991 Pacific-10 Conference football standings
| | Conf. | | | | | Overall |
| Team | W | | L | | T | W | | L | | T |
|---|---|---|---|---|---|---|---|---|---|---|
| No. 1 Washington $ | 8 | – | 0 | – | 0 | 12 | – | 0 | – | 0 |
| No. 7 California | 6 | – | 2 | – | 0 | 10 | – | 2 | – | 0 |
| No. 18 UCLA | 6 | – | 2 | – | 0 | 9 | – | 3 | – | 0 |
| No. 22 Stanford | 6 | – | 2 | – | 0 | 8 | – | 4 | – | 0 |
| Arizona State | 4 | – | 4 | – | 0 | 6 | – | 5 | – | 0 |
| Arizona | 3 | – | 5 | – | 0 | 4 | – | 7 | – | 0 |
| Washington State | 3 | – | 5 | – | 0 | 4 | – | 7 | – | 0 |
| USC | 2 | – | 6 | – | 0 | 3 | – | 8 | – | 0 |
| Oregon | 1 | – | 7 | – | 0 | 3 | – | 8 | – | 0 |
| Oregon State | 1 | – | 7 | – | 0 | 1 | – | 10 | – | 0 |
$ – Conference champion; Rankings from Coaches Poll

The 1991 USC Trojans football team represented the University of Southern California (USC) in the 1991 NCAA Division I-A football season. In their fifth year under head coach Larry Smith, the Trojans compiled a 3–8 record (2–6 against conference opponents), finished in eighth place in the Pacific-10 Conference (Pac-10), and were outscored by their opponents by a combined total of 276 to 229.

Quarterback Reggie Perry led the team in passing, completing 131 of 255 passes for 1,574 yards with three touchdowns and 12 interceptions. Deon Strother led the team in rushing with 129 carries for 614 yards and seven touchdowns. Johnnie Morton led the team in receiving with 49 catches for 662 yards and no touchdowns.

== Schedule ==
| Date | Time | Opponent | Rank | Site | TV | Result | Attendance | Source |
|---|---|---|---|---|---|---|---|---|
| September 2 | 1:30 p.m. | Memphis State* | No. 16 | Los Angeles Memorial Coliseum; Los Angeles, CA | | L 10–24 | 55,637 | |
| September 14 | 6:00 p.m. | No. 5 Penn State* | | Los Angeles Memorial Coliseum; Los Angeles, CA | ABC | W 21–10 | 64,758 | |
| September 21 | 12:30 p.m. | Arizona State | No. 22 | Los Angeles Memorial Coliseum; Los Angeles, CA | ABC | L 25–32 | 59,623 | |
| September 28 | 8:00 p.m. | at Oregon | | Autzen Stadium; Eugene, OR | ESPN | W 30–14 | 45,948 | |
| October 12 | 3:30 p.m. | at Washington State | | Martin Stadium; Pullman, WA | Prime | W 34–27 | 23,997 | |
| October 19 | 12:30 p.m. | Stanford^{†} | | Los Angeles Memorial Coliseum; Los Angeles, CA (rivalry) | ABC | L 21–24 | 61,265 | |
| October 26 | 10:30 a.m. | at No. 5 Notre Dame* | | Notre Dame Stadium; Notre Dame, IN (rivalry) | NBC | L 20–24 | 59,075 | |
| November 2 | 12:30 p.m. | at No. 10 California | | California Memorial Stadium; Berkeley, CA | ABC | L 30–52 | 70,000 | |
| November 9 | 12:30 p.m. | No. 2 Washington | | Los Angeles Memorial Coliseum; Los Angeles, CA | ABC | L 3–14 | 59,320 | |
| November 16 | 3:30 p.m. | at Arizona | | Arizona Stadium; Tucson, AZ | Prime | L 14–31 | 41,053 | |
| November 23 | 12:30 p.m. | No. 25 UCLA | | Los Angeles Memorial Coliseum; Los Angeles, CA (Victory Bell) | Prime | L 21–24 | 84,623 | |
*Non-conference game; ^{†}Homecoming; Rankings from AP Poll released prior to the game; Source:

== Roster ==
1991 USC Trojans football team roster
Players
Coaches
Offense

| Pos. | # | Name | Class |
|---|---|---|---|
| TE | 82 | Bradford Banta | So |
| OT | 71 | Tony Boselli | Fr |
| WR | 3 | Curtis Conway | Jr |
| WR | 88 | Ed Hervey | Fr |
| QB | 11 | Rob Johnson | Fr |
| RB | 40 | Scott Lockwood | Sr |
| WR | 80 | Johnnie Morton | So |

Defense

| Pos. | # | Name | Class |
|---|---|---|---|
| DE | 55 | Willie McGinest | So |
| CB | 18 | Jason Sehorn | So |

Special teams

| Pos. | # | Name | Class |

Head coach

- Larry Smith

Coordinators/assistant coaches

- Tom Roggeman

Legend

- (C) Team captain
- (S) Suspended
- (I) Ineligible
- Injured
- Redshirt
