= 1991 Stanford Cardinal football team =

American college football season

1991 Stanford Cardinal football

Aloha Bowl, L 17–18 vs. Georgia Tech
- Conference: Pacific-10 Conference

Ranking
- Coaches: No. 22
- AP: No. 22
- Record: 8–4 (6–2 Pac-10)
- Head coach: Dennis Green (3rd season)
- Offensive coordinator: Ron Turner (3rd season)
- Offensive scheme: West Coast
- Defensive coordinator: Willie Shaw (2nd season)
- Base defense: 4–3
- Home stadium: Stanford Stadium

1991 Pacific-10 Conference football standings
	Conf.					Overall
Team	W		L		T	W		L		T
No. 1 Washington $	8	–	0	–	0	12	–	0	–	0
No. 7 California	6	–	2	–	0	10	–	2	–	0
No. 18 UCLA	6	–	2	–	0	9	–	3	–	0
No. 22 Stanford	6	–	2	–	0	8	–	4	–	0
Arizona State	4	–	4	–	0	6	–	5	–	0
Arizona	3	–	5	–	0	4	–	7	–	0
Washington State	3	–	5	–	0	4	–	7	–	0
USC	2	–	6	–	0	3	–	8	–	0
Oregon	1	–	7	–	0	3	–	8	–	0
Oregon State	1	–	7	–	0	1	–	10	–	0
$ – Conference champion; Rankings from Coaches Poll

The 1991 Stanford Cardinal football team represented Stanford University as a member of the Pacific-10 Conference (Pac-10) during the 1991 NCAA Division I-A football season. Led by Dennis Green in his third and final season as head coach, the Cardinal compiled an overall record of 8–4 with a mark of 6–2 in conference play, placing in a three-way tie for second in the Pac-10. Stanford was invited to the Aloha Bowl, where the Cardinal lost to Georgia Tech. The team played home games at Stanford Stadium in Stanford, California.

Tommy Vardell rushed for 1,843 yards with 37 touchdowns in his college career. He never fumbled once for Stanford, and ranks second in Stanford football history for most touchdowns and third for most rushing yards. Vardell set the record for most rushing yards in a season by a Cardinal running back, with his 1084 yards in 1991.

Stanford's win over USC in October, its first over the Trojans since 1975, and only its fourth since 1957, signaled a remarkable change in that rivalry’s competitiveness, as the two teams have shared wins roughly evenly in the succeeding years.

== Schedule ==
Date	Time	Opponent	Rank	Site	TV	Result	Attendance	Source
September 7	12:30 p.m.	No. 4 Washington		Stanford Stadium; Stanford, CA	ABC	L 7–42	45,273	
September 14	3:30 p.m.	at Arizona		Arizona Stadium; Tucson, AZ	Prime	L 23–28	43,055	
September 28	12:30 p.m.	No. 17 Colorado*		Stanford Stadium; Stanford, CA	ABC	W 28–21	57,394	
October 5	8:00 p.m.	No. 8 Notre Dame*		Stanford Stadium; Stanford, CA (rivalry)	ESPN	L 26–42	70,798	
October 12	1:00 p.m.	Cornell*		Stanford Stadium; Stanford, CA		W 56–6	30,347	
October 19	3:30 p.m.	at USC		Los Angeles Memorial Coliseum; Los Angeles, CA (rivalry)	Prime	W 24–21	61,265	
October 26	1:00 p.m.	Oregon State		Stanford Stadium; Stanford, CA		W 40–10	21,416	
November 2	1:00 p.m.	at Oregon		Autzen Stadium; Eugene, OR (rivalry)		W 33–13	41,949	
November 9	3:30 p.m.	No. 22 UCLA		Stanford Stadium; Stanford, CA (rivalry)	Prime	W 27–10	55,178	
November 16	1:00 p.m.	at Washington State	No. 22	Martin Stadium; Pullman, WA		W 49–14	18,238	
November 23	12:30 p.m.	No. 6 California	No. 21	Stanford Stadium; Stanford, CA (Big Game)	ABC	W 38–21	85,500	
December 25	12:30 p.m.	vs. Georgia Tech*	No. 17	Aloha Stadium; Halawa, HI (Aloha Bowl)	ABC	L 17–18	34,433	
*Non-conference game; Rankings from AP Poll released prior to the game; Source:

== Game summaries ==
=== Washington ===
#4 Washington at Stanford

Team	1	2	3	4	Total
• Huskies	0	21	0	21	42
Cardinal	0	7	0	0	7

- Date: September 7
- Location: Stanford Stadium, Stanford, CA
- Game start: 12:30 pm PDT
- TV announcers (ABC): Keith Jackson and Bob Griese

Scoring summary
Q2	13:45	UW	Jay Barry 11 yard run (Travis Hanson kick)	UW 7–0
Q2	9:43	UW	Beno Bryant (Travis Hanson kick)	UW 14–0
Q2	2:02	STAN	Tommy Vardell 1 yard run (Aaron Mills kick)	UW 14–7
Q2	0:09	UW	Mario Bailey 26 yard pass from Billy Joe Hobert (Travis Hanson kick)	UW 21–7
Q4	14:02	UW	Joe Kralik 20 yard pass from Billy Joe Hobert (Travis Hanson kick)	UW 28–7
Q4	11:59	UW	Jay Barry 20 yard run (Travis Hanson kick)	UW 35–7
Q4	1:30	UW	Leif Johnson 20 yard run (Travis Hanson kick)	UW 42–7

=== Colorado ===
#17 Colorado at Stanford

Team	1	2	3	4	Total
Buffaloes	0	0	0	21	21
• Cardinal	28	0	0	0	28

- Date: September 7
- Location: Stanford Stadium, Stanford, CA
- Game start: 12:30 pm PDT
- Game attendance: 57,394
- Television network: ABC

=== Vs. Georgia Tech (Aloha Bowl) ===
Georgia Tech vs. #17 Stanford

Team	1	2	3	4	Total
• Yellow Jackets	10	0	0	8	18
Cardinal	7	10	0	0	17

- Date: December 25
- Location: Aloha Stadium, Honolulu, HI
- Game attendance: 34,433
- Referee: Doyle Jackson
- TV announcers (ABC): Keith Jackson, Bob Griese, Jack Arute

== Roster ==
1991 Stanford Cardinal football team roster
Players
Coaches
Offense

Pos.	#	Name	Class
TE	83	Turner Baur	Sr
RB	22	Ozzie Grenardo	Fr
RB	5	Glyn Milburn	Jr
QB	12	Jason Palumbis	Sr
WR	6	Jon Pinckney	Sr
QB	18	Steve Stenstrom	Fr
FB	44	Tommy Vardell	Sr
WR	80	Chris Walsh	Sr
OT	70	Bob Whitfield	Sr

Defense

Pos.	#	Name	Class
CB	21	Darrien Gordon	Jr
SS	17	John Lynch	Jr
DT	60	Tyrone Parker	Jr
LB	36	Tom Williams	Jr

Special teams

Pos.	#	Name	Class
K		Aaron Mills	Fr

Head coach

- Dennis Green

Coordinators/assistant coaches

- Ron Turner – Offensive coordinator and quarterbacks
- Tyrone Willingham – Running backs
- Brian Billick – Wide receivers and tight ends
- Scott Schuhmann – Offensive line
- Willie Shaw – Defensive coordinator and defensive backs
- Mike Nelson – Defensive line
- Mike Tolleson – Inside Linebacker
- Dave Tipton – Outside linebacker
- Chris Foerster – Special teams coordinator

Legend

- (C) Team captain
- (S) Suspended
- (I) Ineligible
- Injured
- Redshirt

== 1992 NFL draft ==
Player	Position	Round	Pick	NFL club
Bob Whitfield	Tackle	1	8	Atlanta Falcons
Tommy Vardell	Running back	1	9	Cleveland Browns
Chris Walsh	Wide receiver	9	251	Buffalo Bills
Turner Baur	Tight end	10	261	New England Patriots
