= 1991 NCAA Division I-A football season =

American college football season

1991 NCAA Division I-A season
- Number of teams: 106
- Preseason AP No. 1: Florida State

Postseason
- Bowl games: 18
- AP Poll No. 1: Miami (FL)
- Coaches Poll No. 1: Washington
- Heisman Trophy: Michigan wide receiver Desmond Howard
- Champion(s): Miami (FL) (AP); Washington (Coaches, FWAA, NFF)

Division I-A football seasons
- ← 1990 1992 →

The 1991 NCAA Division I-A football season was the main college football season sanctioned by the National Collegiate Athletic Association (NCAA). The season began on August 28, 1991, and ended on January 1, 1992. For the second consecutive season, there was a split national championship. Both the Miami Hurricanes and the Washington Huskies finished the season undefeated (12–0) and with the top ranking in a nationally recognized poll.

Under the conference-bowl selection alignments of the time, the Hurricanes and Huskies could not meet in a decisive title game because Washington was slotted into the Rose Bowl as the Pac-10 champions, and the other spot in the Rose Bowl was automatically given to the Big Ten champions (in 1991, that was Michigan). The Rose Bowl's selection terms later thwarted potential title matchups of undefeated teams following the 1994 and 1997 seasons. Following the 1998 Bowl Championship Series (BCS) realignment, several Pac-10 and Big Ten teams were able to play in a BCS title game instead of being forced to play a non-title contender in the Rose Bowl; these include the Ohio State Buckeyes in 2002, 2006 and 2007, the USC Trojans in 2004 and 2005 and the Oregon Ducks in 2010.

Miami closed the 1991 season with a 22–0 shutout over No. 11 Nebraska in the Orange Bowl, but their season was defined by a dramatic November victory over then No. 1 ranked and perennial rival Florida State. That game ended with the FSU place kicker missing a field goal, wide right, which would become a theme in the Florida State–Miami football rivalry; this game later took on the moniker "Wide Right I." Nebraska lost to both national champions in 1991 and finished at 9–2–1, ranked No. 15 in the AP poll.

Washington posted a 15-point victory at No. 9 Nebraska in September, a seven-point win at No. 7 California in October, and repeated as Pac-10 champions. They went on to win the Rose Bowl by 20 points over No. 4 Michigan, the Big Ten champions who featured Heisman Trophy winner Desmond Howard; it was Washington's second consecutive Rose Bowl win. Michigan finished at 10–2, ranked at No. 6 in both polls.

The Florida Gators captured their first official SEC title in school history (they had previously won the 1984 SEC title, but it was later vacated) in dominating fashion. Alabama finished second in the SEC with an 11–1 record, but were shutout 35–0 by the Gators. Florida's luck ran out in the Sugar Bowl, as No. 18 Notre Dame powered their way to a 39–28 win.

== Conference and program changes ==
- Independent Florida State joined the ACC in 1991; known primarily as a basketball conference, the ACC would never be the same for football. Dominant from the moment they joined, Florida State went undefeated in conference play for years and won the conference title for the remainder of the 1990s. The Seminoles would begin ACC football play in 1992.
- The Big East Conference began sponsoring football during the 1991 season after adding Miami and other independent teams. Conference play, however, was not fully integrated and official standings were not kept until 1992.

School	1990 Conference	1991 Conference
Boston College Eagles	I-A Independent	Big East
Florida State Seminoles	I-A Independent	ACC
Miami (FL) Hurricanes	I-A Independent	Big East
Pittsburgh Panthers	I-A Independent	Big East
Rutgers Scarlet Knights	I-A Independent	Big East
Syracuse Orangemen	I-A Independent	Big East
Temple Owls	I-A Independent	Big East
Virginia Tech Hokies	I-A Independent	Big East
West Virginia Mountaineers	I-A Independent	Big East

== Rule changes ==
The NCAA adopted the following rule changes for the 1991 season:

- Repealing a rule change from 1959, the width of the goal posts were shortened from 23 feet, 4 inches to 18 feet, 6 inches, matching the NFL width. The hashmarks did not change from their position of 53 feet, 4 inches apart, causing drastically difficult angles for field-goal attempts.
- Offensive holding, illegal use of hands, and clipping penalties committed behind the line of scrimmage will be enforced from the spot of the foul, rescinding a 1982 rule that enforced those penalties from the previous spot.
- When kickoffs and free kicks go out of bounds untouched in the field of play, the receivers have the option to put the ball in play 30 yards from the spot of the kick, in addition to the two other options (putting the ball in play at the out-of-bounds spot or re-kick after a five-yard penalty).
- When a fumble occurs anywhere in the field of play on fourth down, only the fumbling player can recover and/or advance the fumble. If a teammate recovers the fumble, the ball is dead at the spot of the fumble, unless the recovery was made behind the spot of the fumble, in which case the ball is dead at the spot of recovery. This mirrors the NFL's "Stabler fumble rule" adopted in 1979 after the "Holy Roller" game.
- After numerous taunting incidents in the 1991 Cotton Bowl, unsportsmanlike conduct (15 yard) penalties will be enforced for any taunting acts (such as finger-pointing, baiting an opponent verbally, etc.) and individual celebrations in the field of play.
- Teams attempting the "fumblerooski" must inform the referee of their intentions before the play. If a team fails to do this, they are penalized five yards.

== Recaps of the year ==
=== Regular season ===
==== August–September ====
Neither of the 1990 champions, Colorado and Georgia Tech, cracked the top five in the preseason poll for 1991. The leading teams were No. 1 Florida State, No. 2 Michigan, No. 3 Miami, No. 4 Washington, and No. 5 Florida.

August 29–31: No. 1 Florida State defeated No. 19 Brigham Young 44–28 in the Pigskin Classic, and No. 3 Miami won 31–3 at Arkansas. No. 2 Michigan, No. 4 Washington, and No. 5 Florida had not yet begun their schedules, and the latter team fell out of the top five. No. 7 Penn State, who defeated No. 8 Georgia Tech 34–22 in the Kickoff Classic, moved up: No. 1 Florida State, No. 2 Michigan, No. 3 Miami, No. 4 Washington, and No. 5 Penn State.

September 7: No. 1 Florida State defeated Tulane 38–11, and No. 2 Michigan won 35–13 at Boston College. No. 3 Miami was idle. No. 4 Washington opened their schedule with a 42–7 win at Stanford, and No. 5 Penn State overwhelmed Cincinnati 81–0. The next poll featured No. 1 Florida State, No. 2 Miami, No. 3 Michigan, No. 4 Washington, and No. 5 Penn State.

September 12–14: No. 1 Florida State blasted Western Michigan 58–0, No. 2 Miami defeated No. 10 Houston 40–10, and No. 3 Michigan won 24–14 over No. 7 Notre Dame. No. 4 Washington was idle. No. 5 Penn State lost 21–10 at USC. No. 6 Florida opened SEC play by shutting out No. 17 Alabama 35–0, and the Gators moved back into the top five in the next poll: No. 1 Florida State, No. 2 Miami, No. 3 Michigan, No. 4 Washington, and No. 5 Florida.

September 21: No. 1 Florida State, No. 2 Miami, and No. 3 Michigan were all idle. No. 4 Washington visited No. 9 Nebraska for a 36–21 win, but No. 5 Florida fell 38–21 at No. 18 Syracuse. No. 6 Tennessee won a 26–24 nailbiter against No. 23 Mississippi State to move into the top five: No. 1 Florida State, No. 2 Miami, No. 3 Michigan, No. 4 Washington, and No. 5 Tennessee.

September 28: No. 1 Florida State visited No. 3 Michigan and won 51–31, the most points the Wolverines had ever allowed on their home turf. No. 2 Miami won 34–10 at Tulsa. No. 4 Washington overwhelmed Kansas State 56–3, No. 5 Tennessee defeated No. 13 Auburn 30–21, and No. 6 Oklahoma beat Virginia Tech 27–17. The next poll featured No. 1 Florida State, No. 2 Miami, No. 3 Washington, No. 4 Tennessee, and No. 5 Oklahoma.

==== October ====
October 5: No. 1 Florida State posted another high-scoring win over a top-ten opponent, defeating No. 10 Syracuse 46–14. No. 2 Miami won 40–3 over Oklahoma State, and No. 3 Washington shut out Arizona 54–0. No. 4 Tennessee was idle. No. 5 Oklahoma posted a 29–8 win at Iowa State, but nevertheless fell out of the top five in the next poll. No. 6 Michigan moved back up with a 43–24 victory at No. 9 Iowa: No. 1 Florida State, No. 2 Miami, No. 3 Washington, No. 4 Tennessee, and No. 5 Michigan.

October 12: No. 1 Florida State defeated Virginia Tech 33–20, and No. 2 Miami got past No. 9 Penn State 26–20. No. 3 Washington posted a second straight lopsided shutout, 48–0 over Toledo. No. 4 Tennessee visited No. 10 Florida and lost 35–18. No. 5 Michigan won 45–28 at Michigan State, and No. 7 Notre Dame beat No. 12 Pittsburgh 42–7. The next poll featured No. 1 Florida State, No. 2 Miami, No. 3 Washington, No. 4 Michigan, and No. 5 Notre Dame.

October 19: No. 1 Florida State beat Middle Tennessee 39–10, and No. 2 Miami shut out Long Beach State 55–0. After outscoring their last three opponents 158–3, No. 3 Washington struggled against No. 7 California but pulled out a 24–17 victory. No. 4 Michigan defeated Indiana 24–16, and No. 5 Notre Dame won 28–15 at Air Force. The top five remained the same in the next poll.

October 25–26: No. 1 Florida State visited LSU for a 27–16 victory, No. 2 Miami won 36–9 at Arizona, No. 3 Washington beat Oregon 29–7, No. 4 Michigan defeated Minnesota 52–6, and No. 5 Notre Dame beat USC 24–20. The top five again remained the same in the next poll.

==== November ====
November 2: No. 1 Florida State won 40–15 at Louisville. No. 2 Miami was idle. No. 3 Washington defeated Arizona State 44–16, No. 4 Michigan shut out Purdue 42–0, and No. 5 Notre Dame blanked Navy 38–0. In the next poll, Washington moved up to tie Miami at No. 2, with all of the other top teams remaining the same.

November 9: No. 1 Florida State defeated South Carolina 38–10. No. 2 Miami beat West Virginia 27–3 while fellow No. 2 Washington won 14–3 at USC. No. 4 Michigan was a 59–14 victor over Northwestern. No. 5 Notre Dame blew a 31–7 second-quarter lead and lost 35–34 to No. 13 Tennessee on a blocked field goal attempt as time expired. No. 6 Florida won 45–13 over No. 23 Georgia to clinch the SEC title and a Sugar Bowl berth. The next poll featured No. 1 Florida State, No. 2 Miami, No. 3 Washington, No. 4 Michigan, and No. 5 Florida.

November 16 featured a highly-anticipated showdown between No. 1 Florida State and No. 2 Miami, the first time that the two rivals had met while ranked in the top two spots of the AP Poll. The Seminoles held a 16–7 lead in the fourth quarter, but the Hurricanes responded with a field goal and a touchdown to take a one-point lead with three minutes left. Florida State drove down the field, and coach Bobby Bowden elected to kick a field goal on third down with 29 seconds left. Kicker Gerry Thomas’s 34-yard attempt went wide right, delivering a 17–16 victory to Miami—the first of several FSU-Miami games in the 1990s and early 2000s which featured late-game kicking miscues by the Seminoles. No. 3 Washington won 58–6 at Oregon State and No. 4 Michigan shut out No. 25 Illinois 20–0; by clinching their respective conference titles, the Huskies and Wolverines ensured that they would meet each other in the Rose Bowl. No. 5 Florida finished their SEC schedule by beating Kentucky 35–26. The next poll featured No. 1 Miami, No. 2 Washington, No. 3 Florida State, No. 4 Michigan, and No. 5 Florida.

November 23: No. 1 Miami won 19–14 at Boston College. No. 2 Washington finished their season by defeating Washington State 56–21, and No. 4 Michigan dominated No. 18 Ohio State 31–3. No. 3 Florida State and No. 5 Florida were idle as they prepared to play each other the following week. The top five remained the same in the next poll.

November 30: No. 1 Miami beat San Diego State 39–12. No. 2 Washington and No. 4 Michigan had finished their schedules. No. 3 Florida State suffered their second straight loss to an in-state rival, falling 14–9 to No. 5 Florida. The top five in the final AP Poll of the regular season were No. 1 Miami, No. 2 Washington, No. 3 Florida, No. 4 Michigan, and No. 5 Florida State, but the Coaches’ Poll elevated Washington to No. 1 by a narrow margin.

=== Postseason ===
==== Bowl games ====
With Washington contractually bound to the Rose Bowl and no opportunity for a de facto national championship matchup, No. 1 Miami opted for the hometown Orange Bowl as their postseason game. No. 11 Nebraska and No. 15 Colorado had finished in a tie both in their game against each other and at the top of the Big 8 standings; the Cornhuskers, with a higher ranking and better overall record, would face the Hurricanes. No. 2 Washington and No. 4 Michigan would meet in the Rose Bowl’s annual Pac-10 vs. Big Ten showdown. No. 3 Florida, the SEC champion, would face No. 18 Notre Dame in the Sugar Bowl; No. 5 Florida State would go up against No. 9 Texas A&M, the SWC winner, in the Cotton Bowl; and the Fiesta Bowl would feature No. 6 Penn State against No. 10 Tennessee.

== Conference standings ==
1991 Atlantic Coast Conference football standings
	Conf.					Overall
Team	W		L		T	W		L		T
No. 18 Clemson $	6	–	0	–	1	9	–	2	–	1
No. 24 NC State	5	–	2	–	0	9	–	3	–	0
Georgia Tech	5	–	2	–	0	8	–	5	–	0
Virginia	4	–	2	–	1	8	–	3	–	1
North Carolina	3	–	4	–	0	7	–	4	–	0
Maryland	2	–	5	–	0	2	–	9	–	0
Duke	1	–	6	–	0	4	–	6	–	1
Wake Forest	1	–	6	–	0	3	–	8	–	0
$ – Conference champion; Rankings from AP Poll

1991 Big East Conference football standings
	Conf.					Overall
Team	W		L		T	W		L		T
No. 11 Syracuse	5	–	0	–	0	10	–	2	–	0
No. 1 Miami (FL)	2	–	0	–	0	12	–	0	–	0
Virginia Tech	1	–	0	–	0	5	–	6	–	0
Pittsburgh	3	–	2	–	0	6	–	5	–	0
West Virginia	3	–	4	–	0	6	–	5	–	0
Rutgers	2	–	3	–	0	6	–	5	–	0
Boston College	2	–	4	–	0	4	–	7	–	0
Temple	0	–	5	–	0	2	–	9	–	0
The Big East did not crown an official champion until 1993 when full league play began.; Rankings from AP Poll

1991 Big Eight Conference football standings
	Conf.					Overall
Team	W		L		T	W		L		T
No. 15 Nebraska +	6	–	0	–	1	9	–	2	–	1
No. 20 Colorado +	6	–	0	–	1	8	–	3	–	1
No. 16 Oklahoma	5	–	2	–	0	9	–	3	–	0
Kansas State	4	–	3	–	0	7	–	4	–	0
Kansas	3	–	4	–	0	6	–	5	–	0
Iowa State	1	–	5	–	1	3	–	7	–	1
Missouri	1	–	6	–	0	3	–	7	–	1
Oklahoma State	0	–	6	–	1	0	–	10	–	1
+ – Conference co-champions; Rankings from AP Poll

1991 Big Ten Conference football standings
	Conf.					Overall
Team	W		L		T	W		L		T
No. 6 Michigan $	8	–	0	–	0	10	–	2	–	0
No. 10 Iowa	7	–	1	–	0	10	–	1	–	1
Ohio State	5	–	3	–	0	8	–	4	–	0
Indiana	5	–	3	–	0	7	–	4	–	1
Illinois	4	–	4	–	0	6	–	6	–	0
Purdue	3	–	5	–	0	4	–	7	–	0
Michigan State	3	–	5	–	0	3	–	8	–	0
Wisconsin	2	–	6	–	0	5	–	6	–	0
Northwestern	2	–	6	–	0	3	–	8	–	0
Minnesota	1	–	7	–	0	2	–	9	–	0
$ – Conference champion; Rankings from AP Poll

1991 Big West Conference football standings
	Conf.					Overall
Team	W		L		T	W		L		T
Fresno State +	6	–	1	–	0	10	–	2	–	0
San Jose State +	6	–	1	–	0	6	–	4	–	1
Utah State	5	–	2	–	0	5	–	6	–	0
Pacific (CA)	4	–	3	–	0	5	–	7	–	0
UNLV	2	–	5	–	0	4	–	7	–	0
Long Beach State	2	–	5	–	0	2	–	9	–	0
New Mexico State	2	–	5	–	0	2	–	9	–	0
Cal State Fullerton	1	–	6	–	0	2	–	9	–	0
+ – Conference co-champions

1991 Mid-American Conference football standings
	Conf.					Overall
Team	W		L		T	W		L		T
Bowling Green $	8	–	0	–	0	11	–	1	–	0
Central Michigan	3	–	1	–	4	6	–	1	–	4
Miami (OH)	4	–	3	–	1	6	–	4	–	1
Toledo	4	–	3	–	1	5	–	5	–	1
Ball State	4	–	4	–	0	6	–	5	–	0
Western Michigan	4	–	4	–	0	6	–	5	–	0
Eastern Michigan	3	–	4	–	1	3	–	7	–	1
Ohio	1	–	6	–	1	2	–	8	–	1
Kent State	1	–	7	–	0	1	–	10	–	0
$ – Conference champion

1991 Pacific-10 Conference football standings
	Conf.					Overall
Team	W		L		T	W		L		T
No. 1 Washington $	8	–	0	–	0	12	–	0	–	0
No. 7 California	6	–	2	–	0	10	–	2	–	0
No. 18 UCLA	6	–	2	–	0	9	–	3	–	0
No. 22 Stanford	6	–	2	–	0	8	–	4	–	0
Arizona State	4	–	4	–	0	6	–	5	–	0
Arizona	3	–	5	–	0	4	–	7	–	0
Washington State	3	–	5	–	0	4	–	7	–	0
USC	2	–	6	–	0	3	–	8	–	0
Oregon	1	–	7	–	0	3	–	8	–	0
Oregon State	1	–	7	–	0	1	–	10	–	0
$ – Conference champion; Rankings from Coaches Poll

1991 Southeastern Conference football standings
	Conf.					Overall
Team	W		L		T	W		L		T
No. 7 Florida $	7	–	0	–	0	10	–	2	–	0
No. 5 Alabama	6	–	1	–	0	11	–	1	–	0
No. 14 Tennessee	5	–	2	–	0	9	–	3	–	0
No. 17 Georgia	4	–	3	–	0	9	–	3	–	0
Mississippi State	4	–	3	–	0	7	–	5	–	0
LSU	3	–	4	–	0	5	–	6	–	0
Vanderbilt	3	–	4	–	0	5	–	6	–	0
Auburn	2	–	5	–	0	5	–	6	–	0
Ole Miss	1	–	6	–	0	5	–	6	–	0
Kentucky	0	–	7	–	0	3	–	8	–	0
$ – Conference champion; Rankings from AP Poll

1991 Southwest Conference football standings
	Conf.					Overall
Team	W		L		T	W		L		T
No. 12 Texas A&M $	8	–	0	–	0	10	–	2	–	0
Baylor	5	–	3	–	0	8	–	4	–	0
Texas Tech	5	–	3	–	0	6	–	5	–	0
Arkansas	5	–	3	–	0	6	–	6	–	0
TCU	4	–	4	–	0	7	–	4	–	0
Texas	4	–	4	–	0	5	–	6	–	0
Houston	3	–	5	–	0	4	–	7	–	0
Rice	2	–	6	–	0	4	–	7	–	0
SMU	0	–	8	–	0	1	–	10	–	0
$ – Conference champion; Rankings from AP Poll

1991 Western Athletic Conference football standings
	Conf.					Overall
Team	W		L		T	W		L		T
No. 23 BYU $	7	–	0	–	1	8	–	3	–	2
San Diego State	6	–	1	–	1	8	–	4	–	1
No. 25 Air Force	6	–	2	–	0	10	–	3	–	0
Utah	4	–	4	–	0	7	–	5	–	0
Hawaii	3	–	5	–	0	4	–	7	–	1
Wyoming	2	–	5	–	1	4	–	6	–	1
UTEP	2	–	5	–	1	4	–	7	–	1
Colorado State	2	–	6	–	0	3	–	8	–	0
New Mexico	2	–	6	–	0	2	–	9	–	0
$ – Conference champion; Rankings from AP Poll

1991 NCAA Division I-A independents football records
	Conf.			Overall
Team	W	L	T	W		L		T
No. 9 East Carolina		–		11	–	1	–	0
No. 4 Florida State		–		11	–	2	–	0
No. 3 Penn State		–		11	–	2	–	0
No. 21 Tulsa		–		10	–	2	–	0
Louisiana Tech		–		8	–	1	–	2
No. 13 Notre Dame		–		10	–	3	–	0
Akron		–		5	–	6	–	0
Memphis State		–		5	–	6	–	0
Army		–		4	–	7	–	0
Cincinnati		–		4	–	7	–	0
Southern Miss		–		4	–	7	–	0
South Carolina		–		3	–	6	–	2
Southwestern Louisiana		–		2	–	8	–	1
Louisville		–		2	–	9	–	0
Northern Illinois		–		2	–	9	–	0
Tulane		–		1	–	10	–	0
Navy		–		1	–	10	–	0
Rankings from AP Poll

== I-AA team wins over I-A teams ==
Italics denotes I-AA teams.

Date	Visiting team	Home team	Site	Result	Attendance	Ref.
August 31	Northeast Louisiana	Southwestern Louisiana	Cajun Field • Lafayette, Louisiana (Battle on the Bayou)	21–10	23,486	
September 7	UNLV	No. 5 (I-AA) Nevada	Mackay Stadium • Reno, Nevada (Battle for Nevada)	8–50	24,123	
September 14	Illinois State	Akron	Rubber Bowl • Akron, Ohio	25–3	20,680	
September 14	Long Beach State	No. 11 (I-AA) Boise State	Bronco Stadium • Boise, Idaho	14–48	20,824	
October 5	No. 11 (I-AA) William & Mary	Navy	Navy–Marine Corps Memorial Stadium • Annapolis, Maryland	26–21	23,697	
October 5	Appalachian State	Wake Forest	Groves Stadium • Winston-Salem, North Carolina	17–3	28,234	
October 12	The Citadel	Army	Michie Stadium • West Point, New York	20–14	40,459	
October 26	No. 11 (I-AA) Delaware	Navy	Navy–Marine Corps Memorial Stadium • Annapolis, Maryland	29–25	30,490	
^{#}Rankings from AP Poll released prior to game.

== No. 1 and No. 2 progress ==
In the pre-season poll, Florida State was ranked No. 1 with 54 of the 59 votes cast, Michigan was 2nd, and Miami 3rd. As of the September 10th poll, Florida State remained the overwhelming choice for No. 1 and Miami reached No. 2. Those two Sunshine State teams would continue to be 1 and 2 as their November 16 meeting approached. On November 16 in Tallahassee, the long-awaited No. 1 & No. 2 showdown had the 10–0 Seminoles hosting the 8–0 Hurricanes. Visiting Miami won, 17–16 to take the top spot. In the Pacific Northwest, Washington won its Apple Cup game by 35 points on November 23 and finished the regular season at 11–0; the Huskies took over the No. 2 spot in the final two polls of the regular season.

In the coaches poll, Florida State and Miami opened up the season 1–2 and remained that way until Miami's win on November 16 put the Hurricanes No. 1 and allowed the Huskies to move to No. 2. After the end of the regular season, the coaches moved the Washington Huskies to the No. 1 ranking. They would keep the top spot after their Rose Bowl win over Michigan to split the National Title.

== Bowl games ==
=== New Year's Day Bowls ===
Bowl Game	Winning team	Losing team	Score	Source
Orange Bowl (Miami, Florida)	No. 1 Miami (FL)	No. 11 Nebraska	22–0	
Rose Bowl (Pasadena, California)	No. 2 Washington	No. 4 Michigan	34–14	
Sugar Bowl (New Orleans, Louisiana)	No. 18 Notre Dame	No. 3 Florida	39–28	
Cotton Bowl (Dallas, Texas)	No. 5 Florida State	No. 9 Texas A&M	10–2	
Fiesta Bowl (Tempe, Arizona)	No. 6 Penn State	No. 10 Tennessee	42–17	
Peach Bowl (Atlanta, Georgia)	No. 12 East Carolina	No. 21 NC State	37–34	
Florida Citrus Bowl (Orlando, Florida)	No. 14 California	No. 13 Clemson	37–13	
Hall of Fame Bowl (Tampa, Florida)	No. 16 Syracuse	No. 25 Ohio State	24–17	

=== Other Bowls ===
Bowl Game	Date	Winning team	Losing team	Score	Source
California Bowl (Fresno, California)	December 14, 1991	Bowling Green	Fresno State	28–21	
Aloha Bowl (Hālawa, Hawaii)	December 25, 1991	Georgia Tech	No. 17 Stanford	18–17	
Blockbuster Bowl (Miami Gardens, Florida)	December 28, 1991	No. 8 Alabama	No. 15 Colorado	30–25	
Gator Bowl (Jacksonville, Florida)	December 29, 1991	No. 20 Oklahoma	No. 19 Virginia	48–14	
Independence Bowl (Shreveport, Louisiana)	December 29, 1991	No. 24 Georgia	Arkansas	24–15	
Liberty Bowl (Memphis, Tennessee)	December 29, 1991	Air Force	Mississippi State	38–15	
Holiday Bowl (San Diego, California)	December 30, 1991	BYU	No. 7 Iowa	13–13	
Freedom Bowl (Anaheim, California)	December 30, 1991	No. 22 Tulsa	San Diego State	28–17	
John Hancock Bowl (El Paso, Texas)	December 31, 1991	No. 22 UCLA	Illinois	6–3	
Copper Bowl (Tucson, Arizona)	December 31, 1991	Indiana	Baylor	24–0	

== Final rankings ==
=== AP Poll ===
1. Miami (FL) (32)
2. Washington (28)
3. Penn State
4. Florida State
5. Alabama
6. Michigan
7. Florida
8. California
9. East Carolina
10. Iowa
11. Syracuse
12. Texas A&M
13. Notre Dame
14. Tennessee
15. Nebraska
16. Oklahoma
17. Georgia
18. Clemson
19. UCLA
20. Colorado
21. Tulsa
22. Stanford
23. Brigham Young
24. North Carolina State
25. Air Force

=== Coaches Poll ===
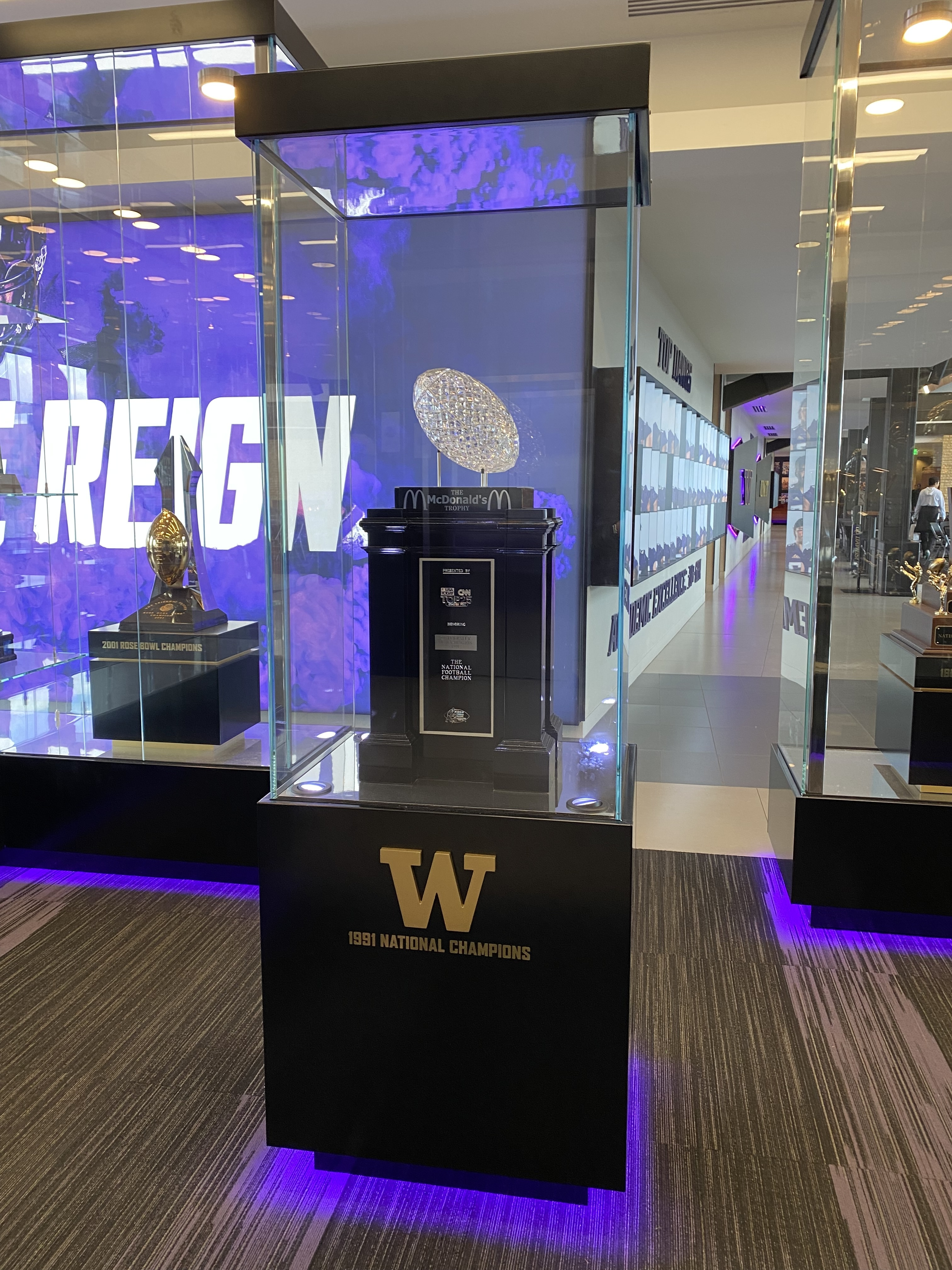
1991 Coaches Poll national championship trophy on display inside Husky Stadium

1. Washington (33 1/2)
2. Miami (FL) (25 1/2)
3. Penn State
4. Florida State
5. Alabama
6. Michigan
7. California
8. Florida
9. East Carolina
10. Iowa
11. Syracuse
12. Notre Dame
13. Texas A&M
14. Oklahoma
15. Tennessee
16. Nebraska
17. Clemson
18. UCLA
19. Georgia
20. Colorado
21. Tulsa
22. Stanford
23. Brigham Young
24. Air Force
25. North Carolina State

== Heisman Trophy voting ==
The Heisman Trophy is given to the year's most outstanding player

Player	School	Position	1st	2nd	3rd	Total
Desmond Howard	Michigan	WR	640	68	21	2,077
Casey Weldon	Florida State	QB	19	175	96	503
Ty Detmer	BYU	QB	19	129	130	445
Steve Emtman	Washington	DT	29	100	70	357
Shane Matthews	Florida	QB	11	72	69	246
Vaughn Dunbar	Indiana	RB	6	51	53	173
Jeff Blake	East Carolina	QB	7	29	35	114
Terrell Buckley	Florida State	CB	1	24	51	102
Marshall Faulk	San Diego State	RB	0	10	32	52
Bucky Richardson	Texas A&M	QB	6	9	9	43

== Other major awards ==
- Maxwell (MVP) - Desmond Howard, Michigan
- Camp (College Player of the Year) - Desmond Howard, Michigan
- Butkus (Linebacker) - Erick Anderson, Michigan
- Lombardi (Lineman) - Steve Emtman, Washington
- Outland (Interior lineman) - Steve Emtman, Washington
- AFCA Coach of the Year - Bill Lewis, East Carolina
- FWAA Coach of the Year - Don James, Washington

== Attendances ==
Average home attendance top 3:

Rank	Team	Average
1	Michigan Wolverines	105,337
2	Tennessee Volunteers	96,398
3	Penn State Nittany Lions	95,846
