= Matt Darby (American football) =

American football player (born 1968)

No. 43
- Position: Safety

Personal information
- Born: November 19, 1968 (age 57); Virginia Beach, Virginia, U.S.
- Listed height: 6 ft 2 in (1.88 m)
- Listed weight: 198 lb (90 kg)

Career information
- High school: Green Run (Virginia Beach)
- College: UCLA
- NFL draft: 1992: 5th round, 139th overall pick

Career history
- Buffalo Bills (1992–1995); Arizona Cardinals (1996–1997)

Awards and highlights
- First-team All-American (1991); First-team All-Pac-10 (1991)

Career NFL statistics
- Tackles: 325
- Interceptions: 8
- INT yards: 89
- Stats at Pro Football Reference

Matthew Lamont Darby (born November 19, 1968) is an American former professional football player who was a safety in the National Football League (NFL). He played college football for the UCLA Bruins, earning first-team All-American honors in 1991. He was selected by the Buffalo Bills in the fifth round of the 1992 NFL draft.

Darby also played for the Arizona Cardinals.
