= 1992 Florida Citrus Bowl =

American college football game

1992 Florida Citrus Growers Association Florida Citrus Bowl
California Golden Bears	Clemson Tigers
(9–2)	(9–1–1)
Pac-10	ACC
37	13
Head coach: Bruce Snyder	Head coach: Ken Hatfield
AP / Coaches; 14 / 14	AP / Coaches; 13 / 12
	1	2	3	4	Total
California	17	10	10	0	37
Clemson	3	7	3	0	13
- Date: January 1, 1992
- Season: 1991
- Stadium: Florida Citrus Bowl
- Location: Orlando, Florida
- MVP: QB Mike Pawlawski (California)
- Referee: Loyd Dale (SWC)
- Attendance: 64,192

United States TV coverage
- Network: ABC
- Announcers: Brent Musburger; Dick Vermeil

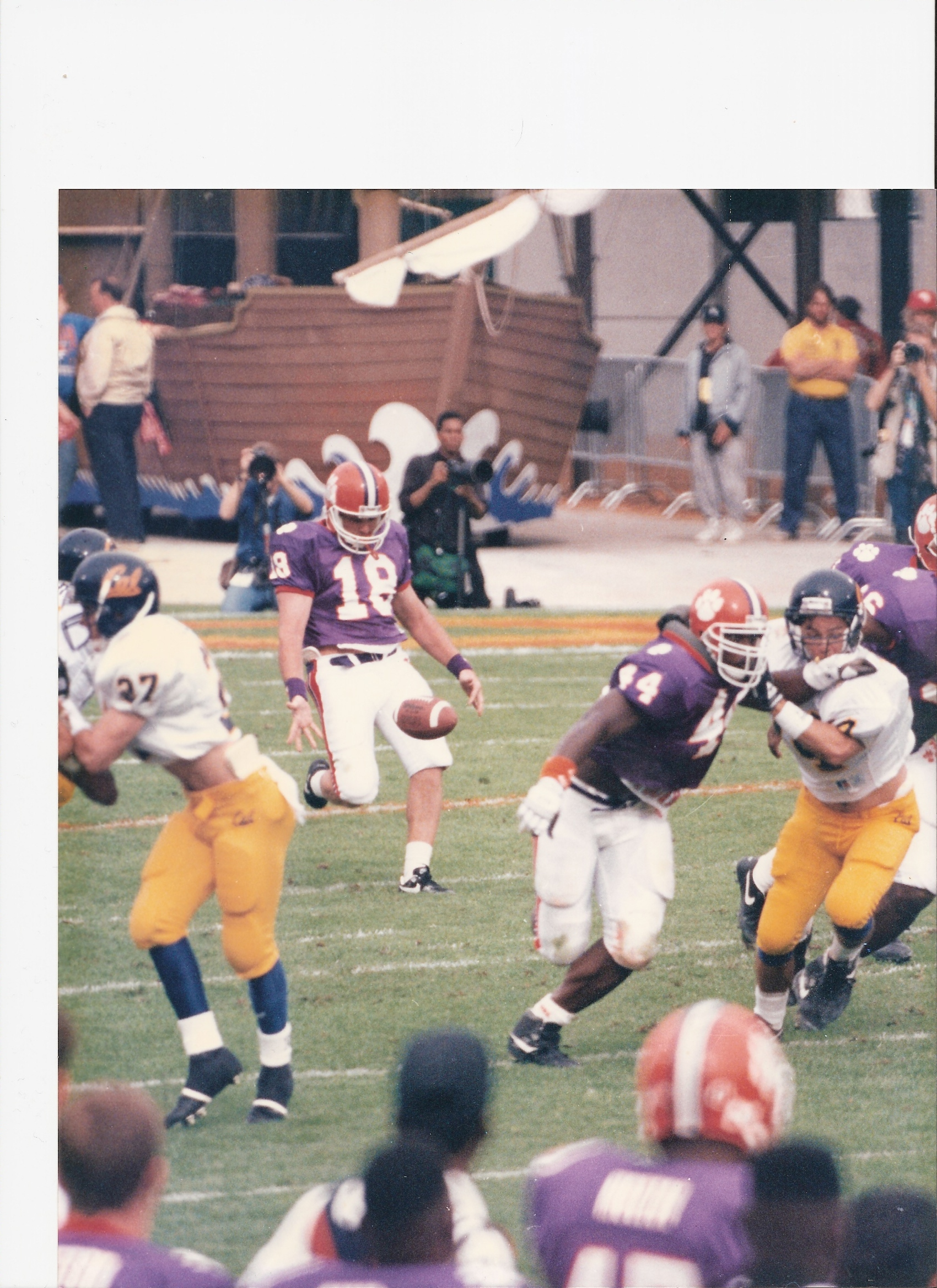
A punt in the 1992 Florida Citrus Bowl

The 1992 Florida Citrus Bowl matched the Clemson Tigers and the California Golden Bears. It was the final game for both teams for the 1991 NCAA Division I-A football season and the 46th annual Citrus Bowl game held.

== Background ==
The Tigers were champions of the Atlantic Coast Conference in Hatfield's 2nd year coaching the team. This was the third overall appearance in the Citrus Bowl for the Tigers, all happening in a span of four years as the team rode a six-game winning streak. The Golden Bears were 2nd in the Pacific-10 Conference to Washington after losses to Washington to Stanford, both losses knocking Cal out of the top 10 in the AP Poll. This was the Bears first consecutive bowl game appearance since the Bears' streak of three straight Rose Bowls from 1949 to 1951, and first Citrus Bowl.

== Game summary ==
By the time the first quarter ended the Bears had a 17–3 lead, as Russell White ran for 103 yards on 22 rushes, Brian Treggs returned a punt return 72 yards for a touchdown, as the Cal defense made DeChane Cameron throw three interceptions and limit him to 123 yards. By halftime, it was 27–10, and the second half only had 13 points, 10 coming from California.

== Aftermath ==
Clemson would not win another ACC title until 2011. Snyder would leave for Arizona State after the bowl win, and Keith Gilbertson would follow as coach, and he continued the bowl win streak until he was fired after his 4th season. Neither team has appeared in the Citrus Bowl since this game. In 2024, California joined the ACC.

== Statistics ==
Statistics	California	Clemson
First downs	22	19
Yards rushing	146	206
Yards passing	230	123
Total yards	376	329
Punts-Average	-	-
Fumbles-Lost	-	-
Interceptions	0	3
Penalties-Yards	-	-
