= 1991 Arizona State Sun Devils football team =

American college football season

1991 Arizona State Sun Devils football
- Conference: Pacific-10 Conference
- Record: 6–5 (4–4 Pac-10)
- Head coach: Larry Marmie (4th season)
- Home stadium: Sun Devil Stadium

1991 Pacific-10 Conference football standings
	Conf.					Overall
Team	W		L		T	W		L		T
No. 1 Washington $	8	–	0	–	0	12	–	0	–	0
No. 7 California	6	–	2	–	0	10	–	2	–	0
No. 18 UCLA	6	–	2	–	0	9	–	3	–	0
No. 22 Stanford	6	–	2	–	0	8	–	4	–	0
Arizona State	4	–	4	–	0	6	–	5	–	0
Arizona	3	–	5	–	0	4	–	7	–	0
Washington State	3	–	5	–	0	4	–	7	–	0
USC	2	–	6	–	0	3	–	8	–	0
Oregon	1	–	7	–	0	3	–	8	–	0
Oregon State	1	–	7	–	0	1	–	10	–	0
$ – Conference champion; Rankings from Coaches Poll

The 1991 Arizona State Sun Devils football team was an American football team that represented Arizona State University as a member of the Pacific-10 Conference (Pac-10) during the 1991 NCAA Division I-A football season. In their fourth and final season under head coach Larry Marmie, the Sun Devils compiled an overall record of 6–5 record with a mark of 4–4 in conference play, placing fifth in the Pac-10, and outscored opponents 218 to 210. The team played home games at Sun Devil Stadium in Tempe, Arizona.

The team's statistical leaders included Bret Powers with 1,500 passing yards, George Montgomery with 475 rushing yards, and Eric Guliford with 801 receiving yards.

== Schedule ==
Date	Opponent	Rank	Site	Result	Attendance	Source
September 14	at Oklahoma State*		Lewis Field; Stillwater, OK	W 30–3	34,600	
September 21	at No. 22 USC		Los Angeles Memorial Coliseum; Los Angeles, CA	W 32–25	59,623	
September 28	No. 16 Nebraska*	No. 24	Sun Devil Stadium; Tempe, AZ	L 9–18	72,812	
October 5	Utah*		Sun Devil Stadium; Tempe, AZ	W 21–15	44,324	
October 12	at Oregon State		Parker Stadium; Corvallis, OR	W 24–7	23,833	
October 19	Washington State	No. 25	Sun Devil Stadium; Tempe, AZ	L 3–17	48,682	
October 26	UCLA		Sun Devil Stadium; Tempe, AZ	L 16–21	46,872	
November 2	at No. 3 Washington		Husky Stadium; Seattle, WA	L 16–44	72,405	
November 9	Oregon		Sun Devil Stadium; Tempe, AZ	W 24–21	48,170	
November 16	at No. 6 California		California Memorial Stadium; Berkeley, CA	L 6–25	46,000	
November 23	Arizona		Sun Devil Stadium; Tempe, AZ (rivalry)	W 37–14	73,427	
*Non-conference game; Rankings from AP Poll released prior to the game; Source:

== Personnel ==
1991 Arizona State Sun Devils football team roster
Players
Coaches
Offense

Pos.	#	Name	Class
QB		Garrick McGee	Fr
QB		Bret Powers

Defense

Pos.	#	Name	Class
CB	1	Phillippi Sparks	Sr
OLB	6	Darren Woodson	Sr

Special teams

Pos.	#	Name	Class

Head coach

- Larry Marmie

Coordinators/assistant coaches

Legend

- (C) Team captain
- (S) Suspended
- (I) Ineligible
- Injured
- Redshirt

== After the season ==
=== NFL draft ===
The following Sun Devils were selected in the 1992 NFL draft after the season.

Round	Pick	Player	Position	NFL team
2	37	Darren Woodson	Safety	Dallas Cowboys
2	41	Phillippi Sparks	Cornerback	New York Giants
2	47	Shane Collins	Defensive end	Washington Redskins
9	232	David Dixon	Defensive tackle	New England Patriots
10	258	Arthur Paul	Defensive tackle	San Diego Chargers
