= Dion Lambert =

American football player (born 1969)

No. 28, 34
- Position: Defensive back

Personal information
- Born: February 12, 1969 (age 57); Lake View Terrace, California, U.S.
- Listed height: 6 ft 0 in (1.83 m)
- Listed weight: 190 lb (86 kg)

Career information
- High school: John F. Kennedy (Los Angeles, California)
- College: UCLA (1987–1991)
- NFL draft: 1992: 4th round, 90th overall pick

Career history
- New England Patriots (1992–1993); Seattle Seahawks (1994–1995); Amsterdam Admirals (1997)

Career NFL statistics
- Tackles: 57
- Interceptions: 1
- Fumble recoveries: 1
- Stats at Pro Football Reference

Dion Adrian Lambert (born February 12, 1969) is an American former professional football player who was a defensive back for three seasons in the National Football League (NFL) with the New England Patriots and Seattle Seahawks. He was selected by the Patriots in the fourth round of the 1992 NFL draft after playing college football for the UCLA Bruins. Lambert was also a member of the Amsterdam Admirals of the World League of American Football (WLAF).

== Early life and college ==
Dion Adrian Lambert was born on February 12, 1969, in Lake View Terrace, California. He attended John F. Kennedy High School in Los Angeles, California.

Lambert played college football for the Bruins of the University of California, Los Angeles. He was on their freshman team in 1987. He was a four-year letterman from 1988 to 1991. He made one interception in 1989 and one interception in 1990.

== Professional career ==
Lambert was selected by the New England Patriots in the fourth round, with the 90th overall pick, of the 1992 NFL draft. He officially signed with the team on July 25. He played in all 16 games for the Patriots in 1992, recording 23 tackles, one sack, and one fumble recovery. Lambert appeared in 14 games, starting four, during the 1993 season, totaling 28 tackles, one interception, and one fumble recovery. He was released by the Patriots on August 28, 1994.

Lambert signed with the Seattle Seahawks on December 20, 1994. He played in one game, a start, for the Seahawks in 1994, recording five solo tackles and one assisted tackle. He was released on September 6, 1995.

Lambert was a member of the Amsterdam Admirals of the World League of American Football (WLAF) in 1997.

== Personal life ==
Lambert was later a high school football coach.
