= Scott Lockwood =

American football player (born 1968)

No. 40
- Position: Running back

Personal information
- Born: March 23, 1968 (age 58); Los Angeles, California, U.S.
- Listed height: 5 ft 10 in (1.78 m)
- Listed weight: 196 lb (89 kg)

Career information
- High school: Fairview (Boulder, Colorado)
- College: USC
- NFL draft: 1992: 8th round, 204th overall pick

Career history
- New England Patriots (1992); Detroit Lions (1992); New England Patriots (1992–1993); Seattle Seahawks (1994)*; Bergamo Lions (1994–1996)
- * Offseason or practice squad member only

Career NFL statistics
- Rushing yards: 162
- Rushing average: 4.6
- Return yards: 233
- Stats at Pro Football Reference

Scott Nelson Lockwood (born March 23, 1968) is an American former professional football player who was a running back for two seasons with the New England Patriots of the National Football League (NFL). He was selected by the Patriots in the eighth round of the 1992 NFL draft. Lockwood also played in the Italian Football League and European Football League He played college football for the USC Trojans

== Early life ==
Scott Nelson Lockwood was born on March 23, 1968, in Los Angeles. He attended Fairview High School in Boulder, Colorado.

== College career ==
Lockwood was a key player at the University of Southern California in 1987, 1988, 1990, 1991. He rushed for 1313 yards and 13 touchdowns and had 50 receptions for 387 yards and a touchdown for the Trojans. He was also a main returner of punts and kickoffs and was selected in the 1992 NFL Draft by the New England Patriots despite an injury plagued senior season.

== Professional career ==
Lockwood was selected by the Patriots in the eighth round of the 1992 NFL draft. He was released on September 17, 1992.

Lockwood was claimed off waivers by the Detroit Lions on September 18, 1992. He was placed on injured reserve on September 25 and was released on October 9, 1992.

Lockwood was signed to the Patriots' practice squad on October 16, 1992, and promoted to the active roster on December 10, 1992. He played in 6 games for the Patriots from 1992 to 1993, rushing 35 times for 162 yards. He also returned 11 kicks for 233 yards. He rushed for a career-high 123 yards on December 27, 1992, against the Miami Dolphins. He was released on September 23, 1993.

Lockwood signed with the Seattle Seahawks on April 27, 1994 and was released on August 28, 1994.

Lockwood played running back for the Bergamo Lions in the Italian Football League in 1994–1996 seasons and was one of top players in the league. He then had a stint coaching in Italy with Sam Pagano who served as the Lions head coach for several seasons.
