= 1991 California Golden Bears football team =

American college football season

1991 California Golden Bears football

Florida Citrus Bowl champion

Florida Citrus Bowl, W 37–13 vs. Clemson
- Conference: Pacific-10 Conference

Ranking
- Coaches: No. 7
- AP: No. 8
- Record: 10–2 (6–2 Pac-10)
- Head coach: Bruce Snyder (5th season)
- Offensive coordinator: Steve Mariucci (2nd season)
- Defensive coordinator: Kent Baer (5th season)
- Home stadium: California Memorial Stadium

1991 Pacific-10 Conference football standings
	Conf.					Overall
Team	W		L		T	W		L		T
No. 1 Washington $	8	–	0	–	0	12	–	0	–	0
No. 7 California	6	–	2	–	0	10	–	2	–	0
No. 18 UCLA	6	–	2	–	0	9	–	3	–	0
No. 22 Stanford	6	–	2	–	0	8	–	4	–	0
Arizona State	4	–	4	–	0	6	–	5	–	0
Arizona	3	–	5	–	0	4	–	7	–	0
Washington State	3	–	5	–	0	4	–	7	–	0
USC	2	–	6	–	0	3	–	8	–	0
Oregon	1	–	7	–	0	3	–	8	–	0
Oregon State	1	–	7	–	0	1	–	10	–	0
$ – Conference champion; Rankings from Coaches Poll

The 1991 California Golden Bears football team represented the University of California, Berkeley as a member of the Pacific-10 Conference (Pac-10) during the 1991 NCAA Division I-A football season. Led by Bruce Snyder in his fifth and final season as head coach, the Golden Bears compiled an overall record of 10–2 with a mark of 6–2 in conference play, placing in a three-way tie for second in the Pac-10. California was invited to the Florida Citrus Bowl, where the Golden Bears defeated Clemson. California climbed from being unranked in the preseason to No. 8 in the final AP poll and No. 7 in the final Coaches Poll. The Golden Bears scored 443 points and allowed 239 points in 12 games. The team played home games at California Memorial Stadium in Berkeley, California.

The team's statistical leaders included Mike Pawlawski with 2,517 passing yards, Russell White with 1,177 rushing yards, and Sean Dawkins with 723 receiving yards.

During their opening game against the Pacific Tigers, California scored so often that the California Victory Cannon on Tightwad Hill ran out of ammunition. This game remains the only such instance in the cannon's history.

== Schedule ==
Date	Time	Opponent	Rank	Site	TV	Result	Attendance	Source
September 7	1:00 p.m.	Pacific (CA)*		California Memorial Stadium; Berkeley, CA		W 86–24	38,000	
September 14	1:00 p.m.	Purdue*		California Memorial Stadium; Berkeley, CA		W 42–18	39,000	
September 21	7:00 p.m.	at Arizona	No. 24	Arizona Stadium; Tucson, AZ		W 23–21	46,715	
October 5	12:30 p.m.	at No. 24 UCLA	No. 18	Rose Bowl; Pasadena, CA (rivalry)	ABC	W 27–24	53,859	
October 12	12:30 p.m.	Oregon	No. 13	California Memorial Stadium; Berkeley, CA	ABC	W 45–7	46,000	
October 19	12:30 p.m.	No. 3 Washington	No. 7	California Memorial Stadium; Berkeley, CA	ABC	L 17–24	74,500	
October 26	1:00 p.m.	San Jose State*	No. 10	California Memorial Stadium; Berkeley, CA		W 41–20	33,000	
November 2	12:30 p.m.	USC	No. 10	California Memorial Stadium; Berkeley, CA	ABC	W 52–30	70,000	
November 9	1:00 p.m.	at Oregon State	No. 7	Parker Stadium; Corvallis, OR		W 27–14	20,798	
November 16	1:00 p.m.	Arizona State	No. 6	California Memorial Stadium; Berkeley, CA		W 25–6	46,000	
November 23	12:30 p.m.	at No. 21 Stanford	No. 6	Stanford Stadium; Stanford, CA (Big Game)	ABC	L 21–38	85,500	
January 1, 1992	10:30 a.m.	vs. No. 13 Clemson*	No. 14	Florida Citrus Bowl; Orlando, FL (Florida Citrus Bowl)	ABC	W 37–13	64,192	
*Non-conference game; Rankings from AP Poll released prior to the game; All times are in Pacific time; Source:

== Game summaries ==
=== Pacific (CA) ===
- Mike Pawlawski 6 TD passes
- Russell White 111 rushing yards

== Roster ==
1991 California Golden Bears football team roster
Players
Coaches
Offense

Pos.	#	Name	Class
OT	52	Troy Auzenne	Sr
WR	86	Sean Dawkins	So
C	59	Steve Gordon	Sr
QB	9	Mike Pawlawski	Sr
OT	75	Todd Steussie	So
WR	3	Brian Treggs	Sr
RB	4	Russell White	Jr

Defense

Pos.	#	Name	Class
DE	72	Chidi Ahanotu	Jr
DB		David Wilson	Sr
S	23	Eric Zomalt	So

Special teams

Pos.	#	Name	Class
K	10	Doug Brien	So

Head coach

- Bruce Snyder

Coordinators/assistant coaches

Legend

- (C) Team captain
- (S) Suspended
- (I) Ineligible
- Injured
- Redshirt

== Team players in the NFL ==
The following players were claimed in the 1992 NFL draft.

Round	Pick	Player	Position	NFL team
2	49	Troy Auzenne	Tackle	Chicago Bears
7	183	David Wilson	Defensive back	Minnesota Vikings
8	222	Mike Pawlawski	Quarterback	Tampa Bay Buccaneers
10	277	Steve Gordon	Center	New England Patriots
