= Steve Gordon (American football) =

American football player (born 1969)

No. 64
- Position: Center

Personal information
- Born: April 15, 1969 (age 57); Fort Ord, California, U.S.
- Listed height: 6 ft 3 in (1.91 m)
- Listed weight: 288 lb (131 kg)

Career information
- High school: Nevada Union (Grass Valley, California)
- College: California
- NFL draft: 1992: 10th round, 277th overall pick
- Expansion draft: 1999: 1st round, 5th overall pick

Career history
- New England Patriots (1992–1993); New Orleans Saints (1993)*; Seattle Seahawks (1994)*; San Francisco 49ers (1995–1997)*; Denver Broncos (1998)*; San Francisco 49ers (1998); Cleveland Browns (1999)*
- * Offseason or practice squad member only

Awards and highlights
- Second-team All-Pac-10 (1991)

Career NFL statistics
- Games played: 13
- Games started: 1
- Stats at Pro Football Reference

Steve Duane Gordon (born April 15, 1969) is an American former professional football player who was a center for four seasons in the National Football League (NFL) with the New England Patriots and the San Francisco 49ers. He played college football for the California Golden Bears and was selected by the Patriots in the 10th round of the 1992 NFL draft with the 277th overall pick. Gordon appeared in a total of 13 career games while making one start.
