= 1991 NCAA Division I-A football rankings =

- Season: 1991
- Bowl season: 1991–92 bowl games
- Preseason No. 1: Florida State
- End of season champions: Miami (FL) (AP); Washington (Coaches, FWAA, NFF)

Two human polls comprised the 1991 National Collegiate Athletic Association (NCAA) Division I-A football rankings. Unlike most sports, college football's governing body, the NCAA, does not bestow a national championship, instead that title is bestowed by one or more different polling agencies. There are two main weekly polls that begin in the preseason—the AP Poll and the Coaches Poll.

== Legend ==
	Increase in ranking
	Decrease in ranking
	Not ranked previous week
	National champion
(#–#)	Win–loss record
(Italics)	Number of first place votes
т	Tied with team above or below also with this symbol

== AP Poll ==
	Preseason Aug 25	Week 1 Sep 3	Week 2 Sep 10	Week 3 Sep 17	Week 4 Sep 24	Week 5 Oct 1	Week 6 Oct 8	Week 7 Oct 15	Week 8 Oct 22	Week 9 Oct 29	Week 10 Nov 5	Week 11 Nov 12	Week 12 Nov 19	Week 13 Nov 26	Week 14 Dec 2	Week 15 (Final) Jan 3	
1.	Florida State (49)	Florida State (1–0) (54)	Florida State (2–0) (53)	Florida State (3–0) (47)	Florida State (3–0) (48)	Florida State (4–0) (56)	Florida State (5–0) (58)	Florida State (6–0) (56)	Florida State (7–0) (56)	Florida State (8–0) (53)	Florida State (9–0) (53)	Florida State (10–0) (53)	Miami (FL) (9–0) (46)	Miami (FL) (10–0) (37 1/2)	Miami (FL) (11–0) (37)	Miami (FL) (12–0) (32)	1.
2.	Michigan (5)	Michigan (0–0) (1)	Miami (FL) (1–0) (2)	Miami (FL) (2–0) (8)	Miami (FL) (2–0) (8)	Miami (FL) (3–0) (2)	Miami (FL) (4–0) (1)	Miami (FL) (5–0) (1)	Miami (FL) (6–0) (2)	Miami (FL) (7–0) (3)	Miami (FL) (7–0) (3) т	Miami (FL) (8–0) (3)	Washington (10–0) (14)	Washington (11–0) (22 1/2)	Washington (11–0) (23)	Washington (12–0) (28)	2.
3.	Miami (FL) (2)	Miami (FL) (1–0) (1)	Michigan (1–0) (1)	Michigan (2–0) (1)	Michigan (2–0) (1)	Washington (3–0) (1)	Washington (4–0) (1)	Washington (5–0) (2)	Washington (6–0) (2)	Washington (7–0) (4)	Washington (8–0) (4) т	Washington (9–0) (4)	Florida State (10–1)	Florida State (10–1)	Florida (10–1)	Penn State (11–2)	3.
4.	Washington (1)	Washington (0–0) (2)	Washington (1–0) (2)	Washington (1–0) (1)	Washington (2–0) (3)	Tennessee (4–0)	Tennessee (4–0)	Michigan (4–1)	Michigan (5–1)	Michigan (6–1)	Michigan (7–1)	Michigan (8–1)	Michigan (9–1)	Michigan (10–1)	Michigan (10–1)	Florida State (11–2)	4.
5.	Florida (1)	Penn State (1–0)	Penn State (2–0)	Florida (2–0) (1)	Tennessee (3–0)	Oklahoma (3–0)	Michigan (3–1)	Notre Dame (5–1)	Notre Dame (6–1)	Notre Dame (7–1)	Notre Dame (8–1)	Florida (8–1)	Florida (9–1)	Florida (9–1)	Florida State (10–2)	Alabama (11–1)	5.
6.	Notre Dame	Florida (0–0)	Florida (1–0) (1)	Tennessee (2–0)	Oklahoma (2–0)	Clemson (3–0)	Oklahoma (4–0)	Florida (5–1)	Florida (6–1)	Florida (6–1)	Florida (7–1)	California (8–1)	California (9–1)	Penn State (9–2)	Penn State (10–2)	Michigan (10–2)	6.
7.	Penn State	Notre Dame (0–0)	Notre Dame (1–0)	Oklahoma (1–0)	Clemson (2–0)	Michigan (2–1)	Notre Dame (4–1)	California (5–0)	Alabama (6–1)	Alabama (6–1)	California (7–1)	Alabama (8–1)	Penn State (9–2)	Iowa (10–1)	Iowa (10–1)	Florida (10–2)	7.
8.	Georgia Tech	Clemson (0–0)	Clemson (1–0)	Clemson (1–0)	Notre Dame (2–1)	Notre Dame (3–1)	Baylor (5–0)	Tennessee (4–1)	Penn State (6–2)	Penn State (7–2)	Alabama (7–1)	Penn State (8–2)	Alabama (9–1)	Alabama (9–1)	Alabama (10–1)	California (10–2)	8.
9.	Clemson (1)	Oklahoma (0–0)	Oklahoma (0–0)	Nebraska (2–0)	Iowa (2–0)	Iowa (3–0)	Penn State (5–1)	Nebraska (4–1)	Nebraska (5–1)	Nebraska (6–1)	Penn State (7–2)	Iowa (8–1)	Iowa (9–1)	Tennessee (8–2)	Texas A&M (10–1)	East Carolina (11–1)	9.
10.	Oklahoma	Houston (1–0) (1)	Houston (1–0) (1)	Iowa (2–0)	Penn State (3–1) т	Syracuse (4–0)	Florida (4–1)	Penn State (5–2)	California (5–1)	California (6–1)	Iowa (7–1)	Tennessee (6–2)	Tennessee (7–2)	Texas A&M (9–1)	Tennessee (9–2)	Iowa (10–1–1)	10.
11.	Tennessee	Tennessee (0–0)	Tennessee (1–0)	Notre Dame (1–1)	Syracuse (3–0) т	Baylor (4–0)	Ohio State (4–0)	NC State (5–0)	Iowa (5–1)	Iowa (6–1)	Nebraska (6–1–1)	Nebraska (7–1–1)	Nebraska (8–1–1)	Nebraska (8–1–1)	Nebraska (9–1–1)	Syracuse (10–2)	11.
12.	Houston (1)	Colorado (0–0)	Colorado (1–0)	Penn State (2–1)	Baylor (3–0)	Penn State (4–1)	Pittsburgh (5–0)	Oklahoma (4–1)	NC State (6–0)	Texas A&M (5–1)	Texas A&M (6–1)	Notre Dame (8–2)	Texas A&M (8–1)	East Carolina (10–1)	East Carolina (10–1)	Texas A&M (10–2)	12.
13.	Colorado	Texas (0–0)	Nebraska (1–0)	Auburn (2–0)	Auburn (3–0)	Florida (3–1)	California (4–0)	Illinois (4–1)	Texas A&M (4–1)	Ohio State (6–1)	Tennessee (5–2)	Texas A&M (7–1)	East Carolina (9–1)	Clemson (8–1–1)	Clemson (9–1–1)	Notre Dame (10–3)	13.
14.	Texas	Nebraska (0–0)	Iowa (1–0)	Baylor (2–0)	Florida (2–1)	Ohio State (3–0)	Nebraska (3–1)	Alabama (5–1)	Ohio State (5–1)	Tennessee (4–2)	Colorado (5–2–1)	East Carolina (8–1)	Clemson (7–1–1)	California (9–2)	California (9–2)	Tennessee (9–3)	14.
15.	Nebraska	Iowa (0–0)	Auburn (1–0)	Texas A&M (1–0)	Ohio State (3–0)	Nebraska (3–1)	Syracuse (4–1)	Iowa (4–1)	Tennessee (4–2)	Colorado (5–2)	Clemson (5–1–1)	Clemson (6–1–1)	Colorado (7–2–1)	Colorado (8–2–1)	Colorado (8–2–1)	Nebraska (9–2–1)	15.
16.	USC	USC (0–0)	Alabama (1–0)	Ohio State (2–0)	Nebraska (2–1)	Auburn (3–1)	NC State (5–0)	Baylor (5–1)	Colorado (4–2)	Clemson (4–1–1)	East Carolina (7–1)	Colorado (6–2–1)	Syracuse (8–2)	Syracuse (9–2)	Syracuse (9–2)	Oklahoma (9–3)	16.
17.	Auburn	Georgia Tech (0–1)	Georgia Tech (0–1)	Georgia Tech (1–1)	Colorado (2–1)	Pittsburgh (4–0)	Iowa (3–1)	Georgia (5–1)	Illinois (4–2)	East Carolina (6–1)	Syracuse (7–2)	Syracuse (7–2)	Notre Dame (8–3)	Stanford (8–3)	Stanford (8–3)	Georgia (9–3)	17.
18.	Iowa	Auburn (1–0)	Michigan State (0–0)	Syracuse (2–0)	Pittsburgh (3–0)	California (3–0)	Clemson (3–1)	Ohio State (4–1)	Syracuse (5–2)	Syracuse (6–2)	NC State (7–1)	Oklahoma (7–2)	Ohio State (8–2)	Notre Dame (8–3)	Notre Dame (9–3)	Clemson (9–2–1)	18.
19.	BYU	Michigan State (0–0)	Ohio State (1–0)	Colorado (1–1)	Georgia Tech (2–1)	NC State (4–0)	Alabama (4–1)	Texas A&M (3–1)	Clemson (3–1–1)	NC State (6–1)	Ohio State (6–2)	Ohio State (7–2)	Oklahoma (8–2)	Oklahoma (8–2)	Virginia (8–2–1)	UCLA (9–3)	19.
20.	Michigan State	Alabama (0–0)	Texas A&M (0–0)	Pittsburgh (3–0)	California (3–0)	Alabama (3–1)	Illinois (3–1)	Pittsburgh (5–1)	East Carolina (5–1)	Oklahoma (5–2)	Oklahoma (6–2)	Baylor (7–2)	Virginia (7–2–1)	Virginia (8–2–1)	Oklahoma (8–3)	Colorado (8–3–1)	20.
21.	Texas A&M	Texas A&M (0–0)	UCLA (1–0)	Houston (1–1)	Mississippi State (3–1)	Georgia Tech (2–2)	Texas A&M (3–1)	Clemson (3–1–1)	Oklahoma (4–2)	Baylor (6–2)	Baylor (7–2)	Virginia (7–2–1)	Stanford (7–3)	NC State (9–2)	NC State (9–2)	Tulsa (10–2)	21.
22.	Alabama	Ohio State (0–0)	Syracuse (1–0)	USC (1–1)	Alabama (2–1)	Illinois (2–1)	Georgia (4–1)	Colorado (3–2)	Baylor (5–2)	Georgia (6–2)	UCLA (6–2)	Stanford (6–3)	NC State (8–2)	Tulsa (8–2)	UCLA (8–3)	Stanford (8–4)	22.
23.	Ohio State	UCLA (0–0)	Baylor (1–0)	Mississippi State (3–0)	North Carolina (2–0)	Texas A&M (2–1)	Ole Miss (5–1)	East Carolina (5–1)	Pittsburgh (5–2)	UCLA (5–2)	Georgia (6–2)	BYU (7–3)	Tulsa (7–2)	UCLA (8–3)	Tulsa (9–2)	BYU (8–3–2)	23.
24.	UCLA	Syracuse (0–0)	Pittsburgh (2–0)	California (2–0)	Arizona State (2–0)	UCLA (2–1)	Auburn (3–2)	Syracuse (4–2)	Georgia (5–2)	Arkansas (5–2)	Virginia (6–2–1)	NC State (7–2)	Georgia (7–3)	Ohio State (8–3)	Georgia (8–3)	NC State (9–3)	24.
25.	Syracuse	BYU (0–1)	Mississippi State (2–0)	Georgia (2–0)	Illinois (2–1)	Colorado (2–2)	Colorado (2–2)	Arizona State (4–1)	Arkansas (5–2)	Fresno State (7–0)	Indiana (5–2–1)	Illinois (6–3)	UCLA (7–3)	Georgia (7–3)	Ohio State (8–3)	Air Force (10–3)	25.
	Preseason Aug 25	Week 1 Sep 3	Week 2 Sep 10	Week 3 Sep 17	Week 4 Sep 24	Week 5 Oct 1	Week 6 Oct 8	Week 7 Oct 15	Week 8 Oct 22	Week 9 Oct 29	Week 10 Nov 5	Week 11 Nov 12	Week 12 Nov 19	Week 13 Nov 26	Week 14 Dec 2	Week 15 (Final) Jan 3	
		None	Dropped: Texas; USC; BYU	Dropped: Alabama; UCLA; Michigan State	Dropped: Texas A&M; Houston; Georgia; USC	Dropped: Arizona State; Mississippi State; North Carolina	Dropped: UCLA; Georgia Tech	Dropped: Auburn; Ole Miss	Dropped: Arizona State	Dropped: Illinois; Pittsburgh	Dropped: Arkansas; Fresno State	Dropped: Georgia; Indiana; UCLA	Dropped: Baylor; BYU; Illinois	None	None	Dropped: Ohio State; Virginia	

== Coaches Poll ==
	Preseason Aug 25	Week 1 Sep 2	Week 2 Sep 9	Week 3 Sep 16	Week 4 Sep 23	Week 5 Sep 30	Week 6 Oct 7	Week 7 Oct 14	Week 8 Oct 21	Week 9 Oct 28	Week 10 Nov 4	Week 11 Nov 11	Week 12 Nov 18	Week 13 Nov 25	Week 14 Dec 2	Week 15 (Final) Jan 3	
1.	Florida State (42)	Florida State (1–0) (43)	Florida State (2–0) (51)	Florida State (3–0) (47)	Florida State (3–0) (49)	Florida State (4–0) (55)	Florida State (5–0) (55)	Florida State (6–0) (55)	Florida State (7–0) (53)	Florida State (8–0) (47)	Florida State (9–0) (47)	Florida State (10–0) (47)	Miami (FL) (9–0) (44)	Miami (FL) (10–0) (32)	Washington (11–0) (29)	Washington (12–0) (33 1/2)	1.
2.	Miami (FL) (3)	Miami (FL) (1–0) (3)	Miami (FL) (1–0) (3)	Miami (FL) (2–0) (6)	Miami (FL) (2–0) (5)	Miami (FL) (3–0) (3)	Miami (FL) (4–0) (3)	Miami (FL) (5–0) (3)	Miami (FL) (6–0) (4)	Miami (FL) (7–0) (4)	Miami (FL) (7–0) (4)	Miami (FL) (8–0) (4)	Washington (10–0) (15)	Washington (11–0) (27)	Miami (FL) (11–0) (30)	Miami (FL) (12–0) (25 1/2)	2.
3.	Michigan (6)	Michigan (0–0) (6)	Washington (1–0) (2)	Michigan (2–0) (4)	Michigan (2–0) (4)	Washington (3–0) (1)	Washington (4–0) (1)	Washington (5–0) (1)	Washington (6–0) (2)	Washington (7–0) (2)	Washington (8–0) (8)	Washington (9–0) (8)	Michigan (9–1)	Michigan (10–1)	Michigan (10–1)	Penn State (11–2)	3.
4.	Washington (3)	Washington (0–0) (3)	Michigan (1–0) (3)	Washington (1–0) (1)	Washington (2–0) (1)	Tennessee (4–0)	Tennessee (4–0)	Michigan (4–1)	Michigan (5–1)	Michigan (6–1)	Michigan (7–1)	Michigan (8–1)	Florida State (10–1)	Florida State (10–1)	Florida (10–1)	Florida State (11–2)	4.
5.	Notre Dame (1)	Penn State (1–0)	Penn State (2–0)	Florida (2–0) (1)	Clemson (2–0)	Clemson (3–0)	Oklahoma (4–0)	Notre Dame (5–1)	Notre Dame (6–1)	Notre Dame (7–1)	Notre Dame (8–1)	Florida (8–1)	Florida (9–1)	Florida (9–1)	Penn State (10–2)	Alabama (11–1)	5.
6.	Georgia Tech (1)	Florida (0–0)	Notre Dame (1–0)	Tennessee (2–0)	Tennessee (3–0)	Oklahoma (3–0)	Michigan (3–1)	Florida (5–1)	Florida (6–1)	Florida (6–1)	Florida (7–1)	Alabama (8–1)	California (9–1)	Penn State (9–2)	Florida State (10–2)	Michigan (10–2)	6.
7.	Florida	Notre Dame (0–0) (1)	Florida (1–0)	Clemson (1–0)	Oklahoma (2–0)	Iowa (3–0)	Baylor (5–0)	Nebraska (4–1)	Nebraska (5–1)	Nebraska (6–1)	Alabama (7–1)	Iowa (8–1)	Penn State (9–2)	Iowa (10–1)	Iowa (10–1)	California (10–2)	7.
8.	Penn State	Clemson (0–0)	Clemson (1–0)	Oklahoma (1–0)	Iowa (2–0)	Notre Dame (2–1)	Notre Dame (4–1)	California (5–0)	Iowa (5–1)	Iowa (6–1)	Iowa (7–1)	California (8–1)	Iowa (9–1)	Alabama (9–1)	Alabama (10–1)	Florida (10–2)	8.
9.	Clemson	Oklahoma (0–0) (2)	Oklahoma (0–0)	Nebraska (2–0)	Notre Dame (2–1)	Michigan (2–1)	Penn State (5–1)	NC State (5–0)	Alabama (6–1)	Alabama (6–1)	California (7–1)	Penn State (8–2)	Alabama (9–1)	Texas A&M (9–1)	Texas A&M (10–1)	East Carolina (11–1)	9.
10.	Colorado (1)	Colorado (0–0) (1)	Houston (1–0)	Iowa (2–0)	Auburn (3–0)	Baylor (4–0)	Florida (4–1)	Tennessee (4–1)	NC State (6–0)	Penn State (7–2)	Penn State (7–2)	Texas A&M (7–1)	Texas A&M (8–1)	Nebraska (8–1–1)	Tennessee (9–2)	Iowa (10–1–1)	10.
11.	Oklahoma (2)	Houston (1–0)	Tennessee (1–0)	Notre Dame (1–1)	Baylor (3–0)	Syracuse (4–0)	Ohio State (4–1)	Iowa (4–1)	Penn State (6–2)	California (6–1)	Nebraska (6–1–1)	Nebraska (7–1–1)	Nebraska (8–1–1)	Tennessee (8–2)	Nebraska (9–1–1)	Syracuse (10–2)	11.
12.	Texas	Texas (0–0)	Colorado (1–0)	Texas A&M (1–0)	Penn State (3–1)	Penn State (4–1)	Pittsburgh (5–0)	Oklahoma (4–1)	California (5–1)	Texas A&M (5–1)	Texas A&M (6–1)	Tennessee (6–2)	Tennessee (7–2)	Clemson (8–1–1)	Clemson (9–2)	Notre Dame (10–3)	12.
13.	Tennessee	Tennessee (0–0)	Nebraska (1–0)	Auburn (2–0)	Syracuse (3–0)	Florida (3–1)	Nebraska (3–1)	Illinois (4–1)	Texas A&M (4–1)	Ohio State (6–1)	Tennessee (5–2)	Notre Dame (8–2)	Clemson (7–1–1)	California (9–2)	East Carolina (10–1)	Texas A&M (10–2)	13.
14.	Houston	Nebraska (0–0)	Iowa (1–0)	Penn State (2–1)	Ohio State (3–0)	Ohio State (3–0)	NC State (5–0)	Alabama (5–0)	Ohio State (5–1)	Colorado (5–2)	Colorado (5–2–1)	Clemson (6–1–1)	Colorado (7–2–1)	Colorado (8–2–1)	California (9–2)	Oklahoma (9–3)	14.
15.	Nebraska	USC (0–0)	Auburn (1–0)	Baylor (2–0)	Florida (2–1)	Pittsburgh (4–0)	Clemson (3–1)	Penn State (5–2)	Colorado (4–2)	Tennessee (4–2)	Clemson (5–1–1)	Colorado (6–2–1)	East Carolina (9–1)	East Carolina (10–1)	Colorado (8–2–1)	Tennessee (9–3)	15.
16.	Auburn	Auburn (1–0)	Alabama (1–0)	Ohio State (2–0)	Nebraska (2–1)	Nebraska (3–1)	California (4–0)	Baylor (5–1)	Tennessee (4–2)	Clemson (4–1–1)	NC State (7–1)	Oklahoma (7–2)	Oklahoma (8–2)	Oklahoma (8–2)	Syracuse (9–2)	Nebraska (9–2–1)	16.
17.	USC	Iowa (0–0)	Ohio State (1–0)	Syracuse (2–0)	Colorado (2–1)	Auburn (3–1)	Iowa (3–1)	Georgia (5–1)	Illinois (4–2)	NC State (6–1)	Syracuse (7–2)	East Carolina (8–1)	Syracuse (8–2)	Syracuse (9–2)	Stanford (8–3)	Clemson (9–2–1)	17.
18.	Iowa	Georgia Tech (0–1)	Texas A&M (0–0)	Pittsburgh (3–0)	Georgia Tech (2–1)	NC State (3–0)	Syracuse (4–1)	Ohio State (4–1)	Clemson (3–1–1)	Syracuse (6–2)	Oklahoma (6–2)	Syracuse (7–2)	Ohio State (8–2)	Notre Dame (8–3)	Notre Dame (9–3)	UCLA (9–3)	18.
19.	BYU	Texas A&M (0–0)	Michigan State (0–0)	Georgia Tech (1–1)	Pittsburgh (3–0)	California (3–0)	Alabama (4–1)	Texas A&M (3–1)	Syracuse (5–2)	Oklahoma (5–2)	East Carolina (7–1)	Ohio State (7–2)	Notre Dame (8–3)	Virginia (8–2–1)	Virginia (8–2–1)	Georgia (9–3)	19.
20.	Texas A&M	Michigan State (0–0)	Georgia Tech (0–1)	Houston (1–1)	California (3–0)	Alabama (3–1)	Illinois (3–1)	Pittsburgh (5–1)	Oklahoma (4–2)	East Carolina (6–1)	Ohio State (6–2)	Baylor (7–2)	Virginia (7–2–1)	Stanford (8–3)	Oklahoma (8–3)	Colorado (8–3–1)	20.
21.	Ohio State	Alabama (0–0)	UCLA (1–0)	Colorado (1–1)	Illinois (2–1)	Illinois (2–1)	Texas A&M (3–1)	Clemson (3–1–1)	Auburn (4–2)	Baylor (6–2)	Baylor (7–2)	Virginia (7–2–1)	Stanford (7–3)	NC State (9–2)	NC State (9–2)	Tulsa (10–2)	21.
22.	Michigan State	Ohio State (0–0)	Syracuse (1–0)	Georgia (2–0)	Mississippi State (3–1)	Texas A&M (2–1)	Georgia (4–1)	Colorado (3–2)	Fresno State (6–0)	Georgia (6–2)	UCLA (6–2)	NC State (7–2)	NC State (8–2)	UCLA (8–3)	Ohio State (8–3)	Stanford (8–4)	22.
23.	Alabama	UCLA (0–0)	Baylor (1–0)	USC (1–1)	NC State (2–0)	Georgia Tech (2–2)	Ole Miss (5–1)	Auburn (4–2)	Baylor (5–2)	Fresno State (7–0)	Georgia (6–2)	BYU (7–2)	Fresno State (9–1)	Ohio State (8–3)	UCLA (8–3)	BYU (8–3–2)	23.
24.	UCLA	Syracuse (0–0)	Pittsburgh (2–0)	Mississippi State (3–0)	Texas A&M (1–1)	UCLA (2–1)	Auburn (3–2)	Arizona State (4–1)	East Carolina (5–1)	UCLA (5–2)	Indiana (5–2–1)	Stanford (6–3)	BYU (7–3–1)	BYU (8–3–1)	Georgia (8–3)	Air Force (10–3)	24.
25.	Baylor	Baylor (0–0)	Georgia (2–0)	California (2–0)	Arizona State	Colorado (2–2)	Colorado (2–2)	Fresno State (5–0)	Pittsburgh (5–2)	Arkansas (5–2)	BYU (6–3)	Fresno State (8–1)	UCLA (7–3)	Fresno State (10–1)	Tulsa (9–2)	NC State (9–3)	25.
	Preseason Aug 25	Week 1 Sep 2	Week 2 Sep 9	Week 3 Sep 16	Week 4 Sep 23	Week 5 Sep 30	Week 6 Oct 7	Week 7 Oct 14	Week 8 Oct 21	Week 9 Oct 28	Week 10 Nov 4	Week 11 Nov 11	Week 12 Nov 18	Week 13 Nov 25	Week 14 Dec 2	Week 15 (Final) Jan 3	
		Dropped: BYU	Dropped: Texas; USC	Dropped: Alabama; Michigan State; UCLA	Dropped: Houston; Georgia; USC	Dropped: Mississippi State; Arizona State	Dropped: Georgia Tech; UCLA	Dropped: Syracuse; Ole Miss	Dropped: Georgia; Arizona State	Dropped: Illinois; Auburn; Pittsburgh	Dropped: Fresno State; Arkansas	Dropped: UCLA; Georgia; Indiana	Dropped: Virginia	None	Dropped: BYU; Fresno State	Dropped: Virginia; Ohio State	

== FWAA poll ==
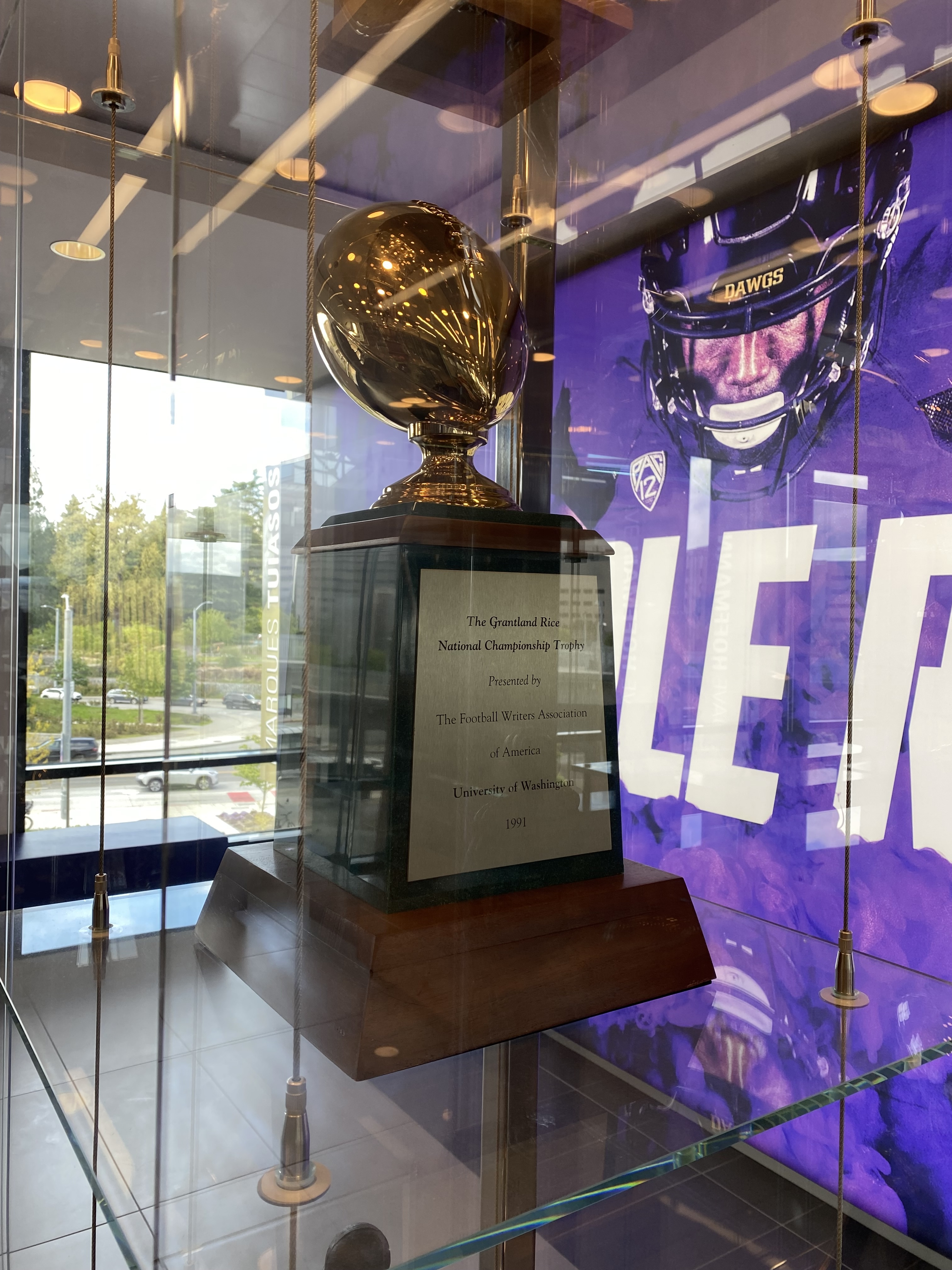
1991 FWAA Grantland Rice National Championship Trophy on display inside Husky Stadium

The Football Writers Association of America awarded the Grantland Rice Trophy to Washington based on the post-bowl voting of a 5-member committee. The Huskies received 3 first-place votes while the Hurricanes got two. The voting members of the FWAA committee were Bob Hammel of the Bloomington Herald-Times, Bil Lumpkin of the Birmingham Post-Herald, Bill McGrotha of the Tallahassee Democrat, Volney Meece of the Daily Oklahoman, and Thomas O'Toole of the Scripps Howard News Service.

	Final January 4	
1.	Washington (3)	1.
2.	Miami (FL) (2)	2.
	Final January 4	

== NFF poll ==
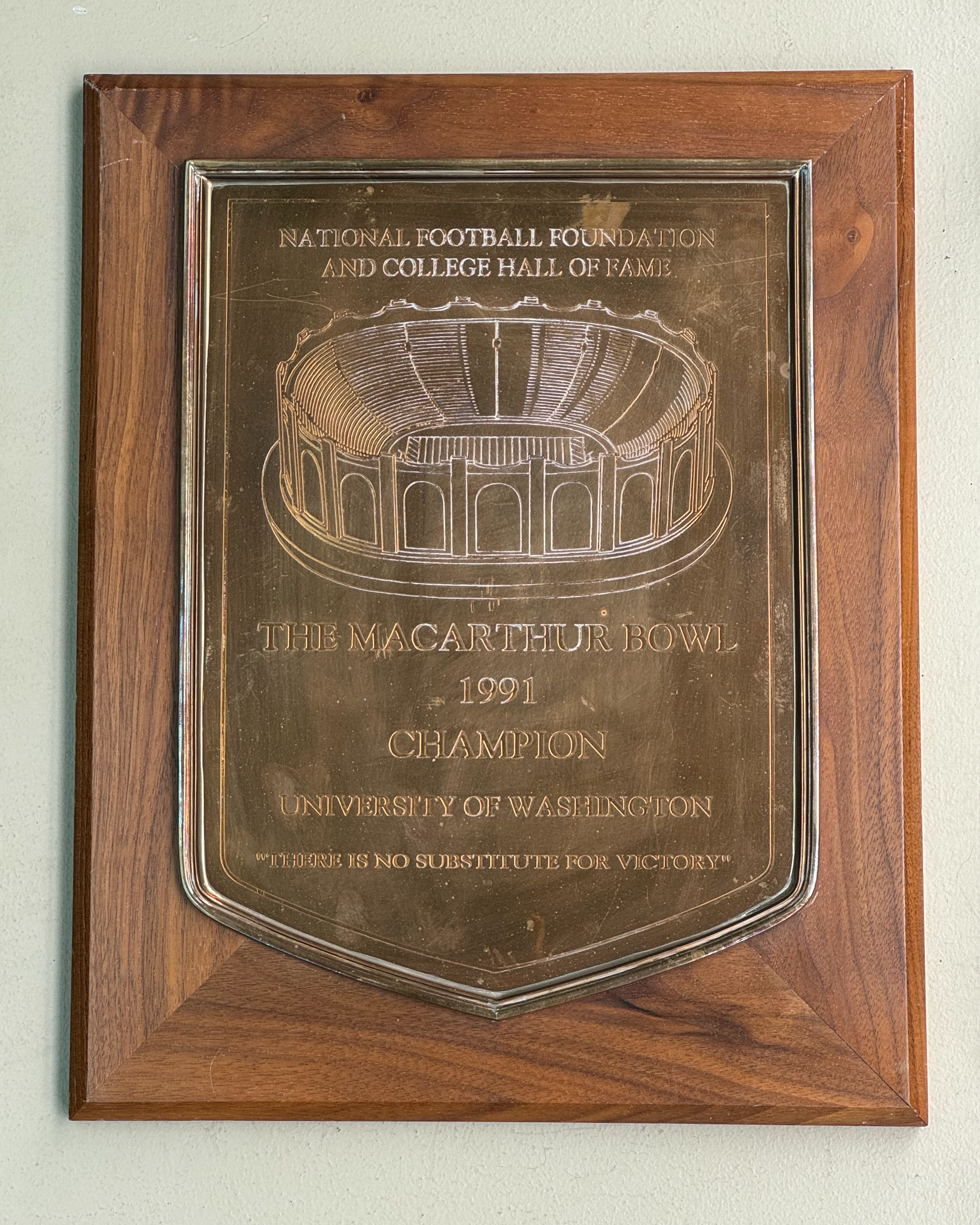
1991 MacArthur Bowl trophy plaque awarded by the National Football Foundation.

In its first year after losing the Coaches' Poll, United Press International polled 104 members of the National Football Foundation to assemble a Top 25 ranking. Washington was ranked No. 1 in the final UPI-NFF poll, with 71 first-place votes to Miami's 21, and won the NFF MacArthur Bowl national championship trophy.

	Final Jan 3	
1.	Washington (12–0) (71) 2279	1.
2.	Miami (FL) (12–0) (21) 2224	2.
3.	Penn State (11–2) 2055	3.
4.	Florida State (11–2) 1998	4.
5.	Alabama (11–1) 1850	5.
6.	Michigan (10–2) 1743	6.
7.	Florida (10–2) 1652	7.
8.	California (10–2) 1607	8.
9.	East Carolina (11–1) 1482	9.
10.	Iowa (10–1–1) 1439	10.
11.	Syracuse (10–2) 1361	11.
12.	Notre Dame (10–3) 1349	12.
13.	Texas A&M (10–2) 1236	13.
14.	Tennessee (9–3) 1059	14.
15.	Nebraska (9–2–1) 964	15.
16.	Oklahoma (9–3) 961	16.
17.	Clemson (9–2–1) 681	17.
18.	Colorado (8–3–1) 666	18.
19.	UCLA (9–3) 655	19.
20.	Georgia (9–3) 565	20.
21.	Tulsa (10–2) 381	21.
22.	Stanford (8–4) 325	22.
23.	NC State (9–3) 303	23.
24.	BYU (8–3–2) 262	24.
25.	Ohio State (8–4) 181	25.
	Final Jan 3	
