= Fresno State Bulldogs football statistical leaders =

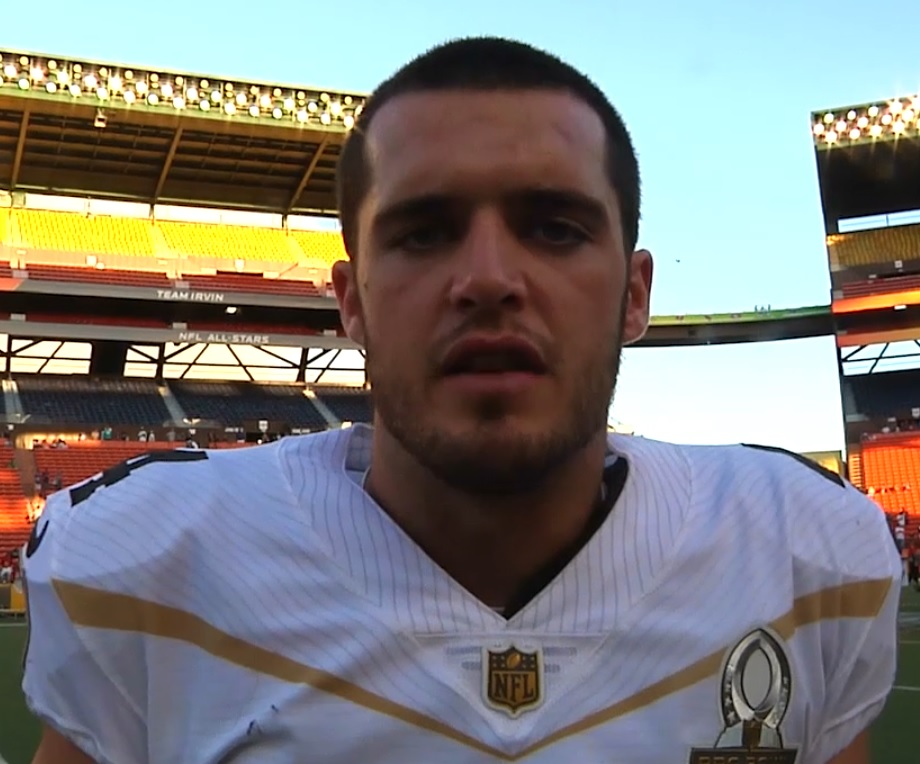
Derek Carr holds all of Fresno State's passing records.

The Fresno State Bulldogs football statistical leaders are individual statistical leaders of the Fresno State Bulldogs football program in various categories, including passing, rushing, receiving, total offense, defensive stats, and kicking. Within those areas, the lists identify single-game, single-season, and career leaders. As of the current 2026 season, the Bulldogs represent California State University, Fresno in the NCAA Division I FBS Pac-12 Conference.

Fresno State began competing in intercollegiate football in 1921, but these lists are dominated by more recent players for several reasons:

- Since 1979, seasons have increased from 10 games to 11 and then 12 games in length.
- The NCAA didn't allow freshmen to play varsity football until 1972 (with the exception of the World War II years), allowing players to have four-year careers.
- Bowl games only began counting toward single-season and career statistics in 2002. The Bulldogs have played in 11 bowl games since this decision, giving many recent players an extra game to accumulate statistics.
- During Fresno State's tenure in the Mountain West Conference (MW) from 2012 to 2025, the Bulldogs appeared in the MW championship game twice.
- During the period in which the MW used a divisional format in football (2013–2022), Fresno State was grouped in the same division as Hawaii, meaning that it played at Hawaii every other year. This is relevant because the NCAA allows teams that play at Hawaii in a given season to schedule 13 regular-season games instead of the normal 12. The Bulldogs played a 13-game regular season once during the MW's divisional era, in 2014.
- From 2018 through 2025, players were allowed to participate in as many as four games in a redshirt season; previously, playing in even one game "burned" the redshirt. In 2024 and 2025, postseason games did not count against the four-game limit. These changes to redshirt rules have given very recent players several extra games to accumulate statistics.
- A more recent change likely to significantly affect future career leaderboards was introduced in 2026 with full implementation starting with the 2027 freshman class. Going forward, redshirting will be prohibited, but players will have five years of full athletic eligibility, provided that they are no older than 19 when they first enroll in a postsecondary institution. Players who had remaining eligibility under previous rules at the end of the 2025 season will benefit from the new rule.

These lists are updated through the end of the 2025 season.

== Passing ==
=== Passing yards ===
Career
| Rank | Player | Yards | Years |
|---|---|---|---|
| 1 | Derek Carr | 12,842 | 2009 2011 2012 2013 |
| 2 | Kevin Sweeney | 10,808 | 1983 1984 1985 1986 |
| 3 | Paul Pinegar | 10,136 | 2002 2003 2004 2005 |
| 4 | Jake Haener | 9,013 | 2020 2021 2022 |
| 5 | Mark Barsotti | 8,093 | 1988 1989 1990 1991 |
| 6 | David Carr | 7,849 | 1997 1998 2000 2001 |
| 7 | Trent Dilfer | 7,631 | 1991 1992 1993 |
| 8 | Tom Brandstater | 6,857 | 2005 2006 2007 2008 |
| 9 | Billy Volek | 6,532 | 1996 1997 1998 1999 |
| 10 | Marcus McMaryion | 6,355 | 2017 2018 |

Single season
| Rank | Player | Yards | Year |
|---|---|---|---|
| 1 | Derek Carr | 5,082 | 2013 |
| 2 | David Carr | 4,839 | 2001 |
| 3 | Derek Carr | 4,104 | 2012 |
| 4 | Jake Haener | 4,096 | 2021 |
| 5 | Trent Dilfer | 3,799 | 1993 |
| 6 | Marcus McMaryion | 3,629 | 2018 |
| 7 | Derek Carr | 3,544 | 2011 |
| 8 | Paul Pinegar | 3,335 | 2005 |
| 9 | Kevin Sweeney | 3,259 | 1984 |
| 10 | Trent Dilfer | 3,000 | 1992 |

Single game
| Rank | Player | Yards | Years | Opponent |
|---|---|---|---|---|
| 1 | Dave Telford | 536 | 1987 | Pacific |
| | Derek Carr | 536 | 2012 | San Diego State |
| 3 | David Carr | 531 | 2001 | Michigan State |
| 4 | Derek Carr | 527 | 2013 | New Mexico |
| 5 | Trent Dilfer | 523 | 1993 | Colorado |
| 6 | Derek Carr | 519 | 2013 | San Jose State |
| 7 | Derek Carr | 487 | 2013 | Nevada |
| 8 | Jake Haener | 485 | 2020 | Nevada |
| 9 | Kevin Sweeney | 476 | 1984 | Montana State |
| 10 | Trent Dilfer | 473 | 1993 | Baylor |

=== Passing touchdowns ===
Career
| Rank | Player | TDs | Years |
|---|---|---|---|
| 1 | Derek Carr | 113 | 2009 2011 2012 2013 |
| 2 | Paul Pinegar | 84 | 2002 2003 2004 2005 |
| 3 | David Carr | 70 | 1997 1998 2000 2001 |
| 4 | Kevin Sweeney | 69 | 1983 1984 1985 1986 |
| 5 | Jake Haener | 67 | 2020 2021 2022 |
| 6 | Billy Volek | 57 | 1996 1997 1998 1999 |
| 7 | Trent Dilfer | 53 | 1991 1992 1993 |
| 8 | Mark Barsotti | 50 | 1988 1989 1990 1991 |
| 9 | Tom Brandstater | 47 | 2005 2006 2007 2008 |
| 10 | Mikey Keene | 42 | 2023 2024 |

Single season
| Rank | Player | TDs | Year |
|---|---|---|---|
| 1 | Derek Carr | 50 | 2013 |
| 2 | David Carr | 46 | 2001 |
| 3 | Derek Carr | 37 | 2012 |
| 4 | Jake Haener | 33 | 2021 |
| 5 | Trent Dilfer | 30 | 1993 |
| | Billy Volek | 30 | 1999 |
| | Paul Pinegar | 30 | 2005 |
| 8 | Derek Carr | 26 | 2011 |
| 9 | Marcus McMaryion | 25 | 2018 |
| 10 | Jeff Tedford | 24 | 1982 |
| | Mikey Keene | 24 | 2023 |

Single game
| Rank | Player | TDs | Years | Opponent |
|---|---|---|---|---|
| 1 | Derek Carr | 7 | 2013 | New Mexico |
| 2 | Bill Yancy | 6 | 1978 | Long Beach State |
| | David Carr | 6 | 2001 | Utah State |
| | Derek Carr | 6 | 2013 | San Jose State |
| | Zack Greenlee | 6 | 2015 | Hawaii |

== Rushing ==
=== Rushing yards ===
Career
| Rank | Player | Yards | Years |
|---|---|---|---|
| 1 | Robbie Rouse | 4,647 | 2009 2010 2011 2012 |
| 2 | Ron Rivers | 3,473 | 1991 1992 1993 |
| 3 | Ronnie Rivers | 3,417 | 2017 2018 2019 2020 2021 |
| 4 | Jordan Mims | 3,288 | 2017 2018 2020 2021 2022 |
| 5 | Ryan Mathews | 3,280 | 2007 2008 2009 |
| 6 | Marteze Waller | 3,108 | 2012 2013 2014 2015 |
| 7 | Michael Pittman | 3,017 | 1993 1994 1995 1996 1997 |
| 8 | Dwayne Wright | 2,683 | 2003 2004 2006 |
| 9 | Dean Philpott | 2,533 | 1954 1955 1956 1957 |
| 10 | Lorenzo Neal | 2,405 | 1990 1991 1992 |

Single season
| Rank | Player | Yards | Year |
|---|---|---|---|
| 1 | Ryan Mathews | 1,808 | 2009 |
| 2 | Rodney Davis | 1,586 | 2002 |
| 3 | Robbie Rouse | 1,549 | 2011 |
| 4 | Robbie Rouse | 1,490 | 2012 |
| 5 | Ron Rivers | 1,477 | 1993 |
| 6 | Dwayne Wright | 1,462 | 2006 |
| 7 | Jordan Mims | 1,370 | 2022 |
| 8 | Marteze Waller | 1,368 | 2014 |
| 9 | Aaron Craver | 1,313 | 1989 |
| | Wendell Mathis | 1,313 | 2005 |

Single game
| Rank | Player | Yards | Years | Opponent |
|---|---|---|---|---|
| 1 | Dwayne Wright | 300 | 2006 | Louisiana Tech |
| 2 | Robbie Rouse | 286 | 2010 | Louisiana Tech |
| 3 | Robbie Rouse | 264 | 2012 | Nevada |
| 4 | Larry Willoughby | 252 | 1952 | Nevada |
| 5 | Ryan Mathews | 238 | 2009 | Boise State |
| 6 | Ryan Mathews | 234 | 2009 | San Jose State |
| 7 | Wendell Mathis | 229 | 2005 | Hawaii |
| 8 | Jim Long | 222 | 1964 | Cal Poly |
| 9 | Rodney Davis | 224 | 2002 | Louisiana Tech |
| 10 | Jerome Oliver | 226 | 1994 | Oregon State |
| | Bryson Sumlin | 226 | 2004 | Hawaii |

=== Rushing touchdowns ===
Career
| Rank | Player | TDs | Years |
|---|---|---|---|
| 1 | Ronnie Rivers | 40 | 2017 2018 2019 2020 2021 |
| 2 | Ryan Mathews | 39 | 2007 2008 2009 |
| 3 | Robbie Rouse | 37 | 2009 2010 2011 2012 |
| | Jordan Mims | 37 | 2017 2018 2020 2021 2022 |
| 5 | Anthony Daigle | 35 | 1991 1992 1993 |
| 6 | Dean Philpott | 29 | 1954 1955 1956 1957 |
| | Michael Pittman | 29 | 1993 1994 1995 1996 1997 |
| | Bryson Sumlin | 29 | 2002 2003 2004 2005 |
| 9 | Ron Rivers | 28 | 1991 1992 1993 |
| 10 | Lorenzo Neal | 27 | 1990 1991 1992 |
| | Wendell Mathis | 27 | 2004 2005 |

Single season
| Rank | Player | TDs | Year |
|---|---|---|---|
| 1 | Ryan Mathews | 19 | 2009 |
| 2 | Jordan Mims | 18 | 2022 |
| 3 | Aaron Craver | 17 | 1990 |
| | Anthony Daigle | 17 | 1992 |
| 5 | Reggie Brown | 15 | 1994 |
| | Wendell Mathis | 15 | 2005 |
| 7 | Dean Philpott | 14 | 1957 |
| | Dale Messer | 14 | 1960 |
| | James Williams | 14 | 1985 |
| | Myron Jones | 14 | 1989 |
| | Ron Rivers | 14 | 1993 |
| | Ryan Mathews | 14 | 2007 |

Single game
| Rank | Player | TDs | Years | Opponent |
|---|---|---|---|---|
| 1 | Don Driscoll | 5 | 1954 | Cal State Los Angeles |
| 2 | Marcus McMaryion | 4 | 1997 | UCLA |
| | Michael Pittman | 4 | 1997 | San Jose State |

== Receiving ==
=== Receptions ===
Career
| Rank | Player | Rec | Years |
|---|---|---|---|
| 1 | Keesean Johnson | 275 | 2015 2016 2017 2018 |
| 2 | Josh Harper | 228 | 2011 2012 2013 2014 |
| 3 | Rodney Wright | 222 | 1998 1999 2000 2001 |
| 4 | Jalen Moreno-Cropper | 221 | 2019 2020 2021 2022 |
| 5 | Isaiah Burse | 209 | 2010 2011 2012 2013 |
| 6 | Bernard Berrian | 199 | 1999 2000 2001 2002 |
| 7 | Brian Roberson | 188 | 1993 1994 1995 1996 |
| 8 | Charlie Jones | 187 | 1992 1993 1994 1995 |
| 9 | Charles Smith | 171 | 1998 1999 2000 2001 |
| 10 | Ronnie Rivers | 150 | 2017 2018 2019 2020 2021 |

Single season
| Rank | Player | Rec | Year |
|---|---|---|---|
| 1 | Davante Adams | 131 | 2013 |
| 2 | Rodney Wright | 104 | 2001 |
| 3 | Davante Adams | 102 | 2012 |
| 4 | Isaiah Burse | 99 | 2013 |
| 5 | Josh Harper | 90 | 2014 |
| 6 | Bernard Berrian | 85 | 2001 |
| | Jalen Moreno-Cropper | 85 | 2021 |
| 8 | Jalen Moreno-Cropper | 84 | 2022 |
| 9 | Larry Ray Willis | 79 | 1984 |
| | Josh Harper | 79 | 2013 |

Single game
| Rank | Player | Rec | Years | Opponent |
|---|---|---|---|---|
| 1 | Isaiah Burse | 17 | 2013 | Utah State |
| | Josh Harper | 17 | 2013 | Nevada |
| 3 | Larry Ray Willis | 16 | 1984 | Montana State |
| | Ron Jenkins | 16 | 1987 | Pacific |
| | Davante Adams | 16 | 2013 | Idaho |
| 6 | Lloyd Madden | 15 | 1967 | Pacific |
| | Stephone Paige | 15 | 1982 | Bowling Green |
| 8 | Rodney Wright | 14 | 2001 | Boise State |
| | Davante Adams | 14 | 2013 | Rutgers |
| | Josh Harper | 14 | 2013 | Rutgers |
| | Jalen Moreno-Cropper | 14 | 2021 | UCLA |

=== Receiving yards ===
Career
| Rank | Player | Yards | Years |
|---|---|---|---|
| 1 | Charlie Jones | 3,344 | 1992 1993 1994 1995 |
| 2 | Rodney Wright | 3,274 | 1998 1999 2000 2001 |
| 3 | Davante Adams | 3,030 | 2012 2013 |
| 4 | Brian Roberson | 2,956 | 1993 1994 1995 1996 |
| 5 | Henry Ellard | 2,947 | 1979 1980 1981 1982 |
| 6 | Josh Harper | 2,938 | 2011 2012 2013 2014 |
| 7 | Bernard Berrian | 2,849 | 1999 2000 2001 2002 2003 |
| 8 | Jalen Moreno-Cropper | 2,708 | 2019 2020 2021 2022 |
| 9 | Isaiah Burse | 2,503 | 2010 2011 2012 2013 |
| 10 | Charles Smith | 2,368 | 1998 1999 2000 2001 |

Single season
| Rank | Player | Yards | Year |
|---|---|---|---|
| 1 | Davante Adams | 1,718 | 2013 |
| 2 | Rodney Wright | 1,630 | 2001 |
| 3 | Henry Ellard | 1,510 | 1982 |
| 4 | Bernard Berrian | 1,364 | 2001 |
| 5 | Davante Adams | 1,312 | 2012 |
| 6 | Larry Ray Willis | 1,251 | 1984 |
| 7 | Brian Roberson | 1,248 | 1996 |
| 8 | Charlie Jones | 1,171 | 1995 |
| 9 | Josh Harper | 1,097 | 2014 |
| 10 | Jalen Moreno-Cropper | 1,093 | 2022 |

Single game
| Rank | Player | Yards | Years | Opponent |
|---|---|---|---|---|
| 1 | Rodney Wright | 299 | 2001 | Michigan State |
| 2 | Larry Ray Willis | 282 | 1984 | Montana State |
| 3 | Davante Adams | 264 | 2013 | San Jose State |
| 4 | Josh Harper | 253 | 2013 | Nevada |
| 5 | Stephone Paige | 246 | 1982 | Bowling Green |
| | Davante Adams | 246 | 2013 | New Mexico |
| 7 | Charlie Jones | 235 | 1994 | Wyoming |
| | Mac Dalena | 235 | 2024 | Sacramento State |
| 9 | Larry Ray Willis | 231 | 1984 | New Mexico State |
| 10 | Henry Ellard | 230 | 1982 | Nevada |

=== Receiving touchdowns ===
Career
| Rank | Player | TDs | Years |
|---|---|---|---|
| 1 | Davante Adams | 38 | 2012 2013 |
| 2 | Josh Harper | 29 | 2011 2012 2013 2014 |
| 3 | Henry Ellard | 25 | 1979 1980 1981 1982 |
| | Charlie Jones | 25 | 1992 1993 1994 1995 |
| | Bernard Berrian | 25 | 1999 2000 2001 2002 2003 |
| 6 | Rodney Wright | 23 | 1998 1999 2000 2001 |
| 7 | Jalen Moreno-Cropper | 21 | 2019 2020 2021 2022 |
| 8 | Charles Smith | 19 | 1998 1999 2000 2001 |
| 9 | Malcolm Seabron | 18 | 1990 1991 1992 1993 |
| 10 | Joe Fernandez | 16 | 2003 2004 2005 2006 |

Single season
| Rank | Player | TDs | Year |
|---|---|---|---|
| 1 | Davante Adams | 24 | 2013 |
| 2 | Henry Ellard | 15 | 1982 |
| 3 | Davante Adams | 14 | 2012 |
| 4 | Bernard Berrian | 13 | 2001 |
| | Josh Harper | 13 | 2013 |
| 6 | Malcolm Seabron | 12 | 1983 |
| | Jalen Saunders | 12 | 2011 |
| 8 | Gary Boreham | 11 | 1970 |
| | Rodney Wright | 11 | 2001 |
| | Jalen Moreno-Cropper | 11 | 2021 |

Single game
| Rank | Player | TDs | Years | Opponent |
|---|---|---|---|---|
| 1 | Jim Molich | 4 | 1942 | Occidental |
| | Charlie Jones | 4 | 1995 | UTEP |
| | Davante Adams | 4 | 2013 | New Mexico |
| | Davante Adams | 4 | 2013 | UNLV |
| | Jalen Moreno-Cropper | 4 | 2021 | UNLV |

== Total offense ==
Total offense is the sum of passing and rushing statistics. It does not include receiving or returns.

=== Total offense yards ===
Career
| Rank | Player | Yards | Years |
|---|---|---|---|
| 1 | Derek Carr | 13,032 | 2009 2011 2012 2013 |
| 2 | Kevin Sweeney | 10,421 | 1983 1984 1985 1986 |
| 3 | Paul Pinegar | 10,113 | 2002 2003 2004 2005 |
| 4 | Jake Haener | 8,913 | 2020 2021 2022 |
| 5 | Mark Barsotti | 8,849 | 1988 1989 1990 1991 |
| 6 | David Carr | 7,947 | 1997 1998 2000 2001 |
| 7 | Trent Dilfer | 7,785 | 1991 1992 1993 |
| 8 | Tom Brandstater | 7,009 | 2005 2006 2007 2008 |
| 9 | Billy Volek | 6,354 | 1996 1997 1998 1999 |
| 10 | Ryan Colburn | 5,582 | 2007 2008 2009 2010 |

Single season
| Rank | Player | Yards | Year |
|---|---|---|---|
| 1 | Derek Carr | 5,199 | 2013 |
| 2 | David Carr | 4,906 | 2001 |
| 3 | Derek Carr | 4,105 | 2012 |
| 4 | Jake Haener | 4,101 | 2021 |
| 5 | Trent Dilfer | 3,799 | 1993 |
| 6 | Derek Carr | 3,616 | 2011 |
| 7 | Paul Pinegar | 3,394 | 2005 |
| 8 | Kevin Sweeney | 3,114 | 1984 |
| 9 | Trent Dilfer | 3,090 | 1992 |
| 10 | Brian Burrell | 2,980 | 2014 |

Single game
| Rank | Player | Yards | Years | Opponent |
|---|---|---|---|---|
| 1 | Derek Carr | 570 | 2012 | San Diego State |
| 2 | Derek Carr | 551 | 2013 | San Jose State |
| 3 | Dave Telford | 548 | 1987 | Pacific |
| | Derek Carr | 548 | 2013 | New Mexico |
| 5 | David Carr | 502 | 2001 | Michigan State |
| | Jake Haener | 502 | 2020 | Nevada |
| 7 | Kevin Sweeney | 484 | 1984 | Montana State |
| 8 | Derek Carr | 482 | 2013 | Nevada |
| 9 | Derek Carr | 480 | 2013 | Rutgers |
| 10 | Trent Dilfer | 474 | 1993 | Colorado |

=== Touchdowns responsible for ===
"Touchdowns responsible for" is the official NCAA term for combined passing and rushing touchdowns.

Career
| Rank | Player | TDs | Years |
|---|---|---|---|
| 1 | Derek Carr | 118 | 2009 2011 2012 2013 |
| 2 | Paul Pinegar | 92 | 2002 2003 2004 2005 |
| 3 | David Carr | 79 | 1997 1998 2000 2001 |
| 4 | Kevin Sweeney | 77 | 1983 1984 1985 1986 |
| 5 | Jake Haener | 75 | 2020 2021 2022 |
| 6 | Mark Barsotti | 71 | 1988 1989 1990 1991 |
| 7 | Billy Volek | 66 | 1996 1997 1998 1999 |
| 8 | Trent Dilfer | 61 | 1991 1992 1993 |
| 9 | Tom Brandstater | 55 | 2005 2006 2007 2008 |
| 10 | Jeff Tedford | 46 | 1981 1982 |

Single season
| Rank | Player | TDs | Year |
|---|---|---|---|
| 1 | Derek Carr | 52 | 2013 |
| 2 | David Carr | 51 | 2001 |
| 3 | Derek Carr | 37 | 2012 |
| 4 | Jake Haener | 36 | 2021 |
| 5 | Billy Volek | 33 | 1999 |
| | Paul Pinegar | 33 | 2005 |
| 7 | Jeff Tedford | 32 | 1982 |
| 8 | Trent Dilfer | 31 | 1993 |
| 9 | Derek Carr | 29 | 2011 |
| 10 | David Carr | 27 | 2000 |

Single game
| Rank | Player | TDs | Years | Opponent |
|---|---|---|---|---|
| 1 | Derek Carr | 7 | 2013 | New Mexico |

== Defense ==
=== Interceptions ===
Career
| Rank | Player | Ints | Years |
|---|---|---|---|
| 1 | Rod Webster | 17 | 1984 1985 1986 1987 |
| 2 | Jim Sanderson | 16 | 1959 1960 1961 |
| | Dave Plump | 16 | 1964 1965 |
| | Jack Erdman | 16 | 1968 1969 |
| 5 | Mike Freeman | 15 | 1967 1968 |
| | Carl Ray Harris | 15 | 1969 1970 |
| | Derron Smith | 15 | 2010 2011 2012 2013 2014 |
| 8 | Phillip Thomas | 13 | 2009 2010 2011 2012 |
| 9 | Matt McKnight | 11 | 1981 1982 |
| | Marquez Pope | 11 | 1988 1989 1990 1991 |
| | James Burton | 11 | 1991 1992 1993 |
| | Cam Lockridge | 11 | 2022 2023 2024 |

Single season
| Rank | Player | Ints | Year |
|---|---|---|---|
| 1 | Carl Ray Harris | 14 | 1970 |
| 2 | Dave Plump | 9 | 1966 |
| | Mike Freeman | 9 | 1967 |
| | Jack Erdman | 9 | 1970 |
| 5 | Ron Cross | 8 | 1984 |
| | Rod Webster | 8 | 1985 |
| | Phillip Thomas | 8 | 2012 |
| 8 | Ervin Hunt | 7 | 1967 |
| | Tom McCall | 7 | 1969 |
| | Jack Erdman | 7 | 1969 |
| | Derron Smith | 7 | 2013 |

Single game
| Rank | Player | Ints | Years | Opponent |
|---|---|---|---|---|
| 1 | Jim Sanderson | 3 | 1960 | San Diego State |
| | Tom McCall | 3 | 1968 | Montana State |
| | Tom McCall | 3 | 1968 | Cal State Los Angeles |
| | Steve Cordle | 3 | 1981 | Oregon |
| | Rod Webster | 3 | 1985 | Oregon State |
| | Phillip Thomas | 3 | 2012 | Colorado |
| | Carlton Johnson | 3 | 2023 | Arizona State |

=== Tackles ===
Career
| Rank | Player | Tackles | Years |
|---|---|---|---|
| 1 | Omar Stoutmire | 458 | 1993 1994 1995 1996 |
| 2 | Tim Skipper | 418 | 1997 1998 1999 2000 |
| 3 | Ben Jacobs | 387 | 2007 2008 2009 2010 |
| 4 | Bryce McGill | 326 | 2000 2001 2002 2003 |
| 5 | A. J. Gass | 325 | 1993 1994 1995 1996 1997 |
| 6 | Malachi Langley | 323 | 2019 2020 2021 2022 2023 2024 |
| 7 | Derron Smith | 304 | 2010 2011 2012 2013 2014 |
| 8 | Zack Rix | 295 | 1989 1990 1991 1992 |
| 9 | Marquez Pope | 290 | 1988 1989 1990 1991 |
| 10 | Vernon Fox | 289 | 1998 1999 2000 2001 |

Single season
| Rank | Player | Tackles | Year |
|---|---|---|---|
| 1 | Omar Stoutmire | 198 | 1995 |
| 2 | Ron Papazian | 158 | 1993 |
| 3 | A. J. Gass | 150 | 1996 |
| 4 | Brad Bell | 144 | 1993 |
| 5 | Ron Papazian | 139 | 1994 |
| 6 | Chris Peters | 136 | 1993 |
| 7 | Zack Rix | 133 | 1992 |
| 8 | Marcus Riley | 132 | 2007 |
| 9 | A. J. Gass | 123 | 1997 |
| 10 | Chris Peters | 119 | 1992 |

Single game
| Rank | Player | Tackles | Years | Opponent |
|---|---|---|---|---|
| 1 | Omar Stoutmire | 24 | 1995 | Utah |

=== Sacks ===
Career
| Rank | Player | Sacks | Years |
|---|---|---|---|
| 1 | Ron Cox | 50.0 | 1987 1988 1989 |
| 2 | Jethro Franklin | 31.5 | 1986 1987 |
| 3 | Nick Burley | 25.0 | 1999 2000 2001 2002 |
| | Garrett McIntyre | 25.0 | 2002 2003 2004 2005 |
| 5 | Tyler Clutts | 23.5 | 2004 2005 2006 2007 |
| 6 | David Perales | 23.0 | 2020 2021 2022 |
| 7 | Alan Harper | 21.0 | 1998 1999 2000 2001 |
| | Ejiro Ederaine | 21.0 | 2012 2013 2014 2015 |
| 9 | Zack Rix | 19.5 | 1989 1990 1991 1992 |
| | Chris Carter | 19.5 | 2007 2008 2009 2010 |

Single season
| Rank | Player | Sacks | Year |
|---|---|---|---|
| 1 | Ron Cox | 28.0 | 1989 |
| 2 | Jethro Franklin | 19.5 | 1986 |
| 3 | Ron Cox | 14.5 | 1988 |
| 4 | Jethro Franklin | 12.0 | 1987 |
| | Alan Harper | 12.0 | 2001 |
| 6 | Tracy Rogers | 11.5 | 1988 |
| | David Perales | 11.5 | 2022 |
| 8 | Brian Morris | 11.0 | 2003 |
| | Chris Carter | 11.0 | 2010 |
| 10 | Greg Ramsey | 10.5 | 1986 |
| | Logan Harrell | 10.5 | 2010 |

Single game
| Rank | Player | Sacks | Years | Opponent |
|---|---|---|---|---|
| 1 | Ron Cox | 7.0 | 1989 | Cal State Fullerton |

== Kicking ==
=== Field goals made ===
Career
| Rank | Player | FGs | Years |
|---|---|---|---|
| 1 | Barry Belli | 70 | 1984 1985 1986 1987 |
| 2 | Dylan Lynch | 64 | 2022 2023 2024 2025 |
| 3 | Kevin Goessling | 61 | 2008 2009 2010 2011 |
| 4 | Asen Asparuhov | 55 | 2000 2001 2002 |
| 5 | Derek Mahoney | 47 | 1990 1991 1992 1993 |
| 6 | Clint Stitser | 37 | 2004 2005 2006 2007 |
| 7 | Jeff Hanna | 36 | 1997 1998 1999 |

Single season
| Rank | Player | FGs | Year |
|---|---|---|---|
| 1 | Dylan Lynch | 24 | 2023 |
| 2 | Asen Asparuhov | 23 | 2001 |
| | Asen Asparuhov | 23 | 2002 |
| 4 | Barry Belli | 21 | 1986 |
| | Brent Visintainer | 21 | 2003 |
| | Kevin Goessling | 21 | 2009 |
| | Dylan Lynch | 21 | 2025 |

Single game
| Rank | Player | FGs | Years | Opponent |
|---|---|---|---|---|
| 1 | Barry Belli | 5 | 1984 | Utah State |
| | Dylan Lynch | 5 | 2023 | Arizona State |

=== Field goal percentage ===
Career
| Rank | Player | FG% | Years |
|---|---|---|---|
| 1 | Kody Kroening | 76.9% | 2014 2015 2016 |
| 2 | Dylan Lynch | 76.2% | 2022 2023 2024 2025 |
| 3 | Kevin Goessling | 75.3% | 2008 2009 2010 2011 |
| 4 | Cesar Silva | 71.7% | 2019 2020 2021 |
| 5 | Clint Stitser | 71.2% | 2004 2005 2006 2007 |
| 6 | Abraham Montano | 70.8% | 2021 2022 |
| 7 | Barry Belli | 70.7% | 1984 1985 1986 1987 |
| 8 | Asen Asparuhov | 70.5% | 2000 2001 2002 |

Single season
| Rank | Player | FG% | Year |
|---|---|---|---|
| 1 | Kevin Goessling | 93.8% | 2009 |
