= List of Fresno State Bulldogs in the NFL draft =

This is a list of Fresno State Bulldogs football players in the NFL draft.

== Key ==
B	Back	K	Kicker	NT	Nose tackle
C	Center	LB	Linebacker	FB	Fullback
DB	Defensive back	P	Punter	HB	Halfback
DE	Defensive end	QB	Quarterback	WR	Wide receiver
DT	Defensive tackle	RB	Running back	G	Guard
E	End	T	Offensive tackle	TE	Tight end

== Draft picks ==
Year drafted	Round	Pick in round	Overall pick	Player	Team	Position
1941	15	9	139	Jack Mulkey	Chicago Bears	E
1944	6	7	50	Jackie Fellows	Washington Redskins	B
1944	15	3	145	Jim Molich	Detroit Lions	E
1944	22	5	224	Roy Renfro	New York Giants	G
1945	7	3	57	Louie Futrell	Boston Yanks	B
1947	22	2	197	Gene Lamoure	Boston Yanks	G
1950	23	8	295	Bill Montgomery	Chicago Cardinals	B
1953	23	11	276	Larry Willoughby	Los Angeles Rams	B
1954	22	1	254	Ledio Fanucchi	Chicago Cardinals	T
1957	10	11	120	Bill Murphy	Chicago Bears	E
1957	24	3	280	Darryl Rogers	Los Angeles Rams	B
1957	27	11	324	Nick Brown	Chicago Bears	G
1958	11	1	122	Dean Philpott	Chicago Cardinals	FB
1960	12	2	134	Doug Brown	Los Angeles Rams	DT
1960			Second Selections	Doug Brown	Dallas Texans*	T-G
1961	4	10	52	Dale Messer	San Francisco 49ers	HB
1961	13	7	103	Dale Messer	San Diego Chargers**	HB
1962	11	8	88	Sonny Bishop	San Diego Chargers**	G
1962	10	12	138	J.R. Williams	New York Giants	C
1962	21	8	168	Jesse Williams	San Diego Chargers**	C
1962	17	9	233	Bill Knocke	Baltimore Colts	HB
1962	18	11	249	Sonny Bishop	Cleveland Browns	G
1962	19	11	263	Jon Anabo	Cleveland Browns	QB
1963	9	8	72	Jan Barrett	Kansas City Chiefs**	E
1963	6	14	84	Jan Barrett	Green Bay Packers	E
1963	9	6	118	Monte Day	Chicago Bears	T
1963	13	6	174	Paul Wicker	Dallas Cowboys	T
1963	23	1	177	Jon Anabo	Oakland Raiders**	QB
1963	26	5	205	Monte Day	Denver Broncos**	T
1963	29	2	226	Herman Hamp	San Diego Chargers**	HB
1963	29	3	227	Paul Wicker	New York Jets**	T
1963	19	14	266	Herman Hamp	Green Bay Packers	B
1964	12	1	155	Jim Long	San Francisco 49ers	B
1964	22	7	175	Jim Long	Oakland Raiders**	FB
1965	12	2	156	Dave Plump	San Francisco 49ers	DB
1965	RS10	6	78	Dave Plump	San Diego Chargers***	HB
1967	10	9	246	Bill Wilsey	Pittsburgh Steelers	LB
1967	14	15	356	Walt Richardson	Los Angeles Rams	DT
1968	4	6	89	Mike Freeman	Minnesota Vikings	DB
1968	4	12	95	Len McNeil	Philadelphia Eagles	G
1969	16	17	407	John Stahl	Detroit Lions	G
1970	6	15	145	Ervin Hunt	Green Bay Packers	DB
1973	6	7	137	Dwayne Crump	St. Louis Cardinals	DB
1973	7	23	179	Gary Weaver	Oakland Raiders	LB
1976	6	22	178	Calvin Lane	San Diego Chargers	DB
1976	14	22	397	Calvin Young	Oakland Raiders	RB
1978	11	13	291	Dean Jones	Oakland Raiders	DB
1978	11	26	304	Bob Glazebrook	Oakland Raiders	DB
1979	11	6	281	Bob Rippentrop	Tampa Bay Buccaneers	TE
1979	11	7	282	Mike Mince	New York Giants	DB
1981	2	16	44	Anthony Washington	Pittsburgh Steelers	DB
1982	9	21	244	Tony Woodruff	Philadelphia Eagles	WR
1982	12	28	334	Tim Washington	San Francisco 49ers	DB
1983	2	4	32	Henry Ellard	Los Angeles Rams	WR
1984	10	8	260	Derrick Franklin	Atlanta Falcons	DB
1987	3	27	83	Stephen Baker	New York Giants	WR
1987	6	23	163	Gene Taylor	New England Patriots	WR
1987	7	12	180	Kevin Sweeney	Dallas Cowboys	QB
1987	8	18	213	Michael Stewart	Los Angeles Rams	DB
1987	8	22	217	David Grayson	San Francisco 49ers	LB
1988	5	10	119	Mike Withycombe	New York Jets	G
1988	11	14	291	Keith McCoy	Phoenix Cardinals	DB
1988	11	21	298	Jethro Franklin	Houston Oilers	DE
1989	7	23	190	Tracy Rogers	Houston Oilers	LB
1990	1	16	16	James Williams	Buffalo Bills	DB
1990	2	8	33	Ron Cox	Chicago Bears	LB
1990	8	27	220	Dwight Pickens	San Francisco 49ers	WR
1990	9	4	224	Terry Cook	Tampa Bay Buccaneers	DE
1990	11	28	304	Myron Jones	Los Angeles Raiders	DB
1991	3	5	60	Aaron Craver	Miami Dolphins	RB
1992	2	5	33	Marquez Pope	San Diego Chargers	DB
1992	5	23	135	Tony Brown	Houston Oilers	DB
1992	11	16	296	Mark Barsotti	Miami Dolphins	QB
1993	4	5	89	Lorenzo Neal	New Orleans Saints	FB
1994	1	6	6	Trent Dilfer	Tampa Bay Buccaneers	QB
1994	3	3	68	Tydus Winans	Washington Redskins	WR
1994	3	36	101	Malcolm Floyd	Houston Oilers	WR
1994	5	20	151	James Burton	Kansas City Chiefs	DB
1994	6	24	185	Anthony Daigle	Kansas City Chiefs	RB
1995	5	5	139	David Dunn	Cincinnati Bengals	WR
1996	3	30	91	Reggie Brown	Seattle Seahawks	RB
1996	4	19	114	Charlie Jones	San Diego Chargers	WR
1996	4	37	132	Jahine Arnold	Pittsburgh Steelers	WR
1997	7	21	222	Chris Bayne	Atlanta Falcons	DB
1997	7	23	224	Omar Stoutmire	Dallas Cowboys	DB
1998	3	5	66	Chris Conrad	Pittsburgh Steelers	T
1998	4	3	95	Michael Pittman	Arizona Cardinals	RB
1999	3	4	65	Cory Hall	Cincinnati Bengals	DB
2001	4	9	104	Orlando Huff	Seattle Seahawks	LB
2002	1	1	1	David Carr	Houston Texans	QB
2002	4	23	121	Alan Harper	New York Jets	DT
2002	7	10	221	Maurice Rodriguez	Kansas City Chiefs	LB
2002	7	38	249	Rodney Wright	Buffalo Bills	WR
2003	3	19	83	Sam Williams	Oakland Raiders	DE
2004	3	15	78	Bernard Berrian	Chicago Bears	WR
2004	7	34	235	Derrick Ward	New York Jets	RB
2005	1	32	32	Logan Mankins	New England Patriots	G
2005	4	32	133	James Sanders	New England Patriots	DB
2006	2	26	58	Richard Marshall	Carolina Panthers	DB
2006	6	15	184	Adam Jennings	Atlanta Falcons	WR
2006	6	16	185	Tyrone Culver	Green Bay Packers	DB
2007	3	8	72	Marcus McCauley	Minnesota Vikings	DB
2007	3	16	80	Paul Williams	Tennessee Titans	WR
2007	4	12	111	Dwayne Wright	Buffalo Bills	RB
2007	7	14	214	Chris Denman	Tampa Bay Buccaneers	T
2008	5	10	145	Jason Shirley	Cincinnati Bengals	DT
2009	6	1	174	Tom Brandstater	Denver Broncos	QB
2009	6	11	184	Bear Pascoe	San Francisco 49ers	TE
2010	1	12	12	Ryan Mathews	San Diego Chargers	RB
2011	5	31	162	Chris Carter	Pittsburgh Steelers	LB
2011	7	7	210	Andrew Jackson	Atlanta Falcons	OL
2012	4	12	107	Devon Wylie	Kansas City Chiefs	WR
2013	4	22	119	Phillip Thomas	Washington Redskins	DB
2014	2	4	36	Derek Carr	Oakland Raiders	QB
2014	2	21	53	Davante Adams	Green Bay Packers	WR
2015	5	18	154	Tyeler Davison	New Orleans Saints	DT
2015	6	21	197	Derron Smith	Cincinnati Bengals	FS
2015	6	39	215	Cody Wichmann	St. Louis Rams	G
2019	6	1	174	KeeSean Johnson	Arizona Cardinals	WR
2020	4	13	119	Mykal Walker	Atlanta Falcons	LB
2020	6	22	181	Netane Muti	Denver Broncos	G
2022	5	24	167	DaRon Bland	Dallas Cowboys	CB
2023	4	25	127	Jake Haener	New Orleans Saints	QB

* Pick was made as part of the original AFL draft to stock the new league.
** Pick was made in the regular AFL draft (1961–1966).
*** Pick was made in the AFL Redshirt draft (1965–1966).
