= Jeff Tedford =

American football player and coach (born 1961)

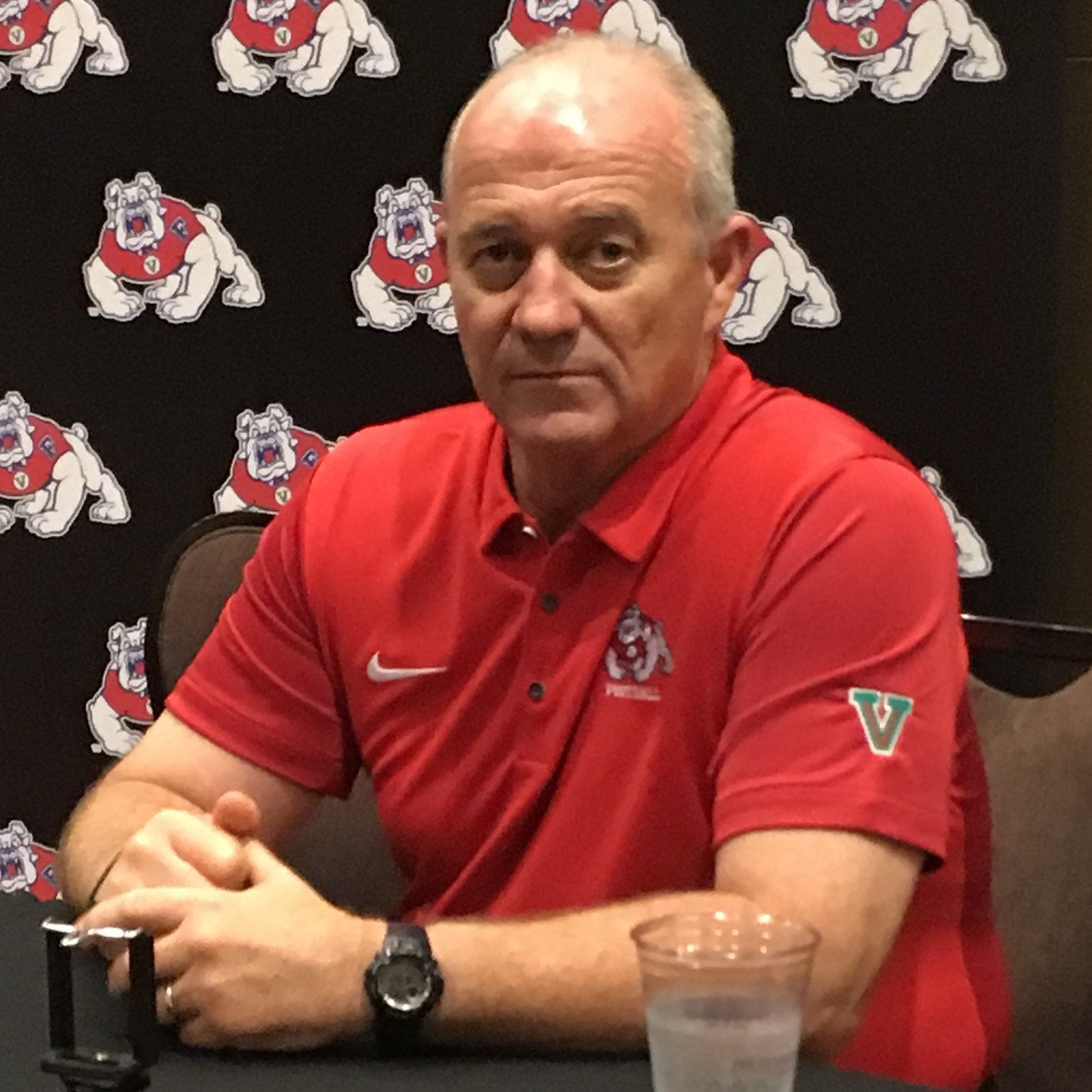
- Tedford at 2017 Mountain West media day

Biographical details
- Born: November 2, 1961 (age 65); Lynwood, California, U.S.
- Education: California State University, Fresno

Playing career
- 1979–1980: Cerritos
- 1981–1982: Fresno State
- 1983–1985: Hamilton Tiger-Cats
- 1986: Calgary Stampeders
- 1987: Saskatchewan Roughriders
- 1988: Winnipeg Blue Bombers
- Position: Quarterback

Coaching career (HC unless noted)
- 1989–1991: Calgary Stampeders (OA)
- 1992: Fresno State (QB)
- 1993–1997: Fresno State (OC/QB)
- 1998–2001: Oregon (OC/QB)
- 2002–2012: California
- 2014: Tampa Bay Buccaneers (OC)
- 2015: BC Lions
- 2016: Washington (Off. consultant)
- 2017–2019: Fresno State
- 2022–2023: Fresno State

Head coaching record
- Overall: NCAA: 126–79; CFL: 7–12
- Bowls: 9–3

Accomplishments and honors

Championships
- Pac-10 (2006) (Note: Co-champion with USC); 2× MW (2018, 2022); 3× MW West Division (2017, 2018, 2022)

Awards
- 2× Pac-10 Coach of the Year (2002, 2004); MW Coach of the Year (2017)

Jeffrey Raye Tedford (born November 2, 1961) is an American football coach and former player. From 2002 to 2012, Tedford was the head football coach for the California Golden Bears, where he was twice named Pac-10 Coach of the Year and holds the California program records for most wins, games coached, and bowl game victories. He also coached at Fresno State from 2017 to 2019 and from 2022 to 2023, leading the team to a school record 12 wins in 2018.

Tedford played as a quarterback, playing college football for the Cerritos Falcons and Fresno State, then he played in the Canadian Football League (CFL).

In his first head coaching position, Tedford inherited a Golden Bears team that had won only one game in its 2001 season. He was named conference coach of the year in his first season in 2002 after winning seven games. California was ranked No. 2 nationwide midseason in 2007, the school's highest ranking since 1951. However, Tedford's teams struggled later in his tenure, particularly from 2010 to 2012, and he was fired after the 2012 season. He was the seventh highest paid California state employee as of 2016.

== Early life ==
Tedford was born in Lynwood, California, the youngest of five children of Joe and Betty Tedford. Tedford's parents divorced before he turned 10. His brother Dennis, 10 years his senior, helped raise Tedford, taking him on camping trips and driving him to football practice and games. Tedford attended Warren High School in Downey, California, where he was a letterman in football, playing quarterback and earning an All-League selection. Tedford graduated from Warren High School in 1979.

== College ==
After high school, Tedford enrolled at Cerritos College, becoming the first member of his family to attend college. He spent two years playing quarterback at Cerritos followed by two years at Fresno State, where he established several passing records, including career marks for passing yardage (4,872) and touchdown passes (35). As a senior, Tedford led the Bulldogs to a Pacific Coast Athletic Association conference championship and a last-second, 29–28 come-from-behind victory in the 1982 California Bowl.

- 1981: 132/250 for 1,879 yards with 11 TD vs 11 INT. Ran for 11 yards and 3 TD.
- 1982: 153/298 for 2,620 yards with 21 TD vs 18 INT.

After graduating with a Bachelor of Science degree in physical education in 1983, Tedford played professionally in the Canadian Football League (CFL) for six seasons with Hamilton, Calgary, Saskatchewan, and Winnipeg.

== Coaching career ==
=== Early coaching career ===
After retiring as a player, Tedford became a volunteer assistant coach at Fresno State (1987–1988) under his former coach Jim Sweeney. He then coached as an offensive assistant for the Calgary Stampeders in the CFL (1989–1991); returned to Fresno State as quarterback coach (1992); was promoted to offensive coordinator at Fresno State (1993–1997); and worked as offensive coordinator at the University of Oregon (1998–2001). During his time at Oregon, the Ducks notched a Pac-10-best record of 38–10 while finishing progressively better each year (8–4 in 1998, 9–3 in 1999, 10–2 in 2000 and 11–1 in 2001).

While at Fresno State, he was instrumental in developing many players who went on to the NFL: QB Trent Dilfer (1992–1993), QB Billy Volek (1997), RB Ron Rivers (1993), RB Reggie Brown (1994–1995), RB Michael Pittman (1993–1997), and WR Charlie Jones (1993–1995).

From 1998 to 2001 at Oregon he worked with future NFL talents such as: QB Akili Smith, QB A. J. Feeley, QB Joey Harrington, RB Reuben Droughns, RB Maurice Morris, RB Onterrio Smith, WR Tony Hartley, WR Keenan Howry, WR Samie Parker, TE Justin Peelle, and TE George Wrighster.

=== California ===
After previous Cal coach Tom Holmoe resigned from his post amid a 1–10 season in 2001, the worst in Cal's history up to that point (the Bears would later go 1–11 in 2013), then-athletic director Steve Gladstone hired Tedford to become Cal's 32nd head football coach. Tedford inherited a program that had not had a winning season since 1993 and had only won 29 games on the field since then, including only 18 wins in Pac-10 play.

During his time at Cal, Tedford became known for his work ethic, often working late hours in his office and sleeping on an air mattress. In evidence of his turnaround of the Cal program, season ticket sales jumped from 16,200 in 2002 to 41,336 in 2007, setting new records each year from 2004 through 2007.

In Tedford's first season (2002), he led the Golden Bears to a 7–5 record, their first winning football season since 1993, the nation's biggest turnaround of the year, and was named Pac-10 coach of the year. The Bears ended a 19-game losing streak to Washington and a seven-game losing streak to arch rival Stanford in the Big Game. Despite their resurgence, the Bears didn't go to a bowl due to NCAA sanctions for academic fraud that were handed down shortly before Tedford took over. After the season, Tedford signed a five-year contract through 2007 to replace his original four-year contract, which ran through 2005.

In the 2003 season, Tedford's record of 8–6 included the upset of eventual national co-champion University of Southern California in triple overtime, as well as a 52–49 shootout victory against Virginia Tech in the 2003 Insight Bowl. The Bears won 5 of their last 6 games.

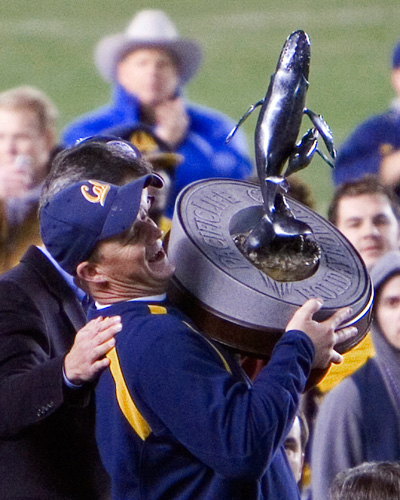
Tedford accepts the 2006 Holiday Bowl trophy

In the 2004 football season, the Bears finished with a No. 9 national ranking in both the AP Poll and the ESPN/USA Today Coaches Poll with a 10–2 record, losing to Texas Tech in the Holiday Bowl. Tedford was named Pac-10 coach of the year for a second time. The team was undefeated at home, notched the fifth 10-win season in school history (and first since 1949).

Following the regular season, Tedford signed an extension of his contract through 2009, which nearly doubled his base salary to $1.5 million per year; in the deal he also had the pay of his assistant coaches raised significantly.

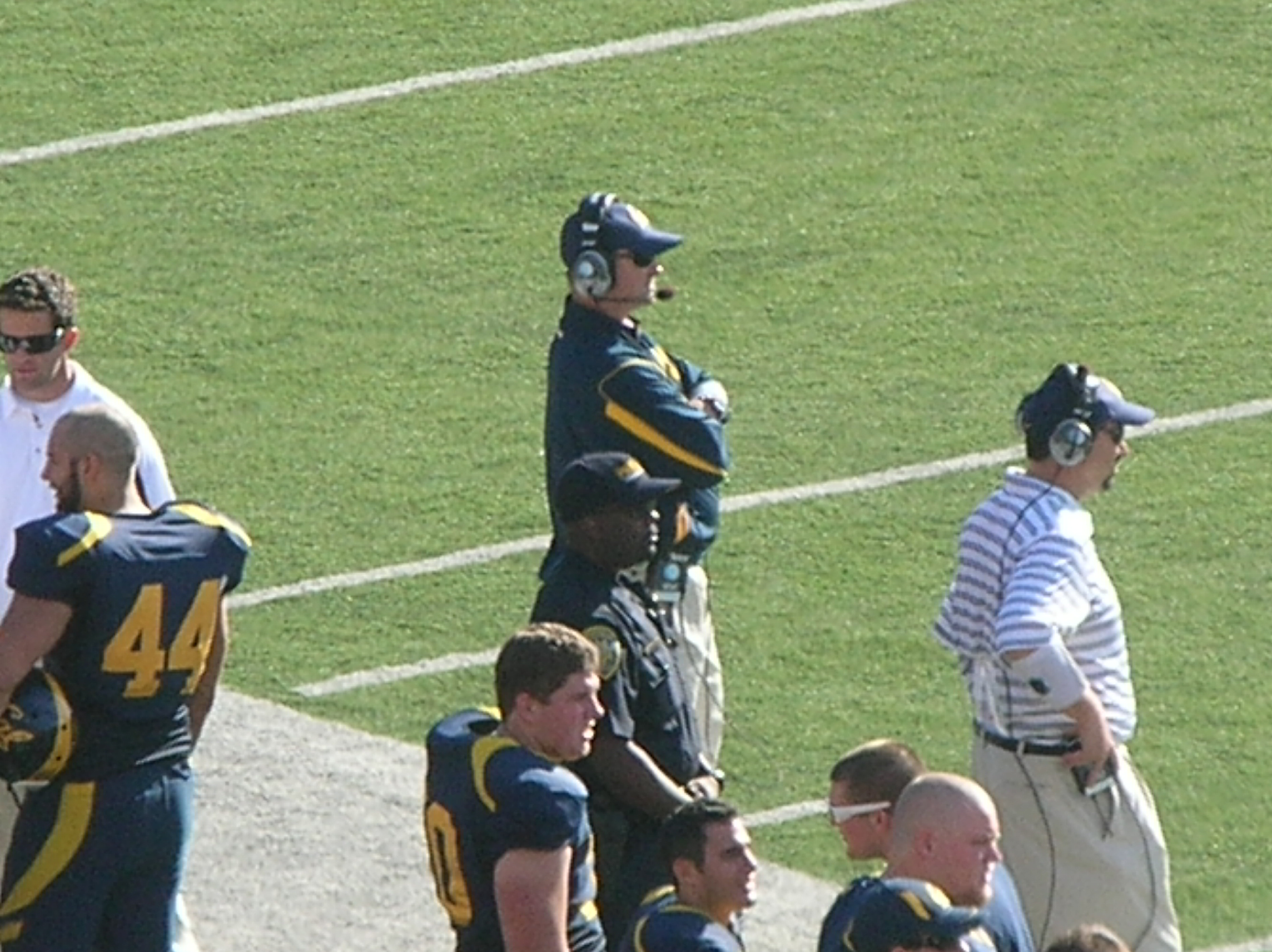
Tedford (center) at the 2008 Big Game

In 2005, the Bears finished with a No. 25 national ranking in both the AP Poll and the ESPN/USA Today Coaches Poll with an 8–4 record. Cal rose as high as No. 10 in the AP Poll and No. 9 in the ESPN/USA Today Coaches Poll in week 6 before losing to UCLA 47–40. They beat BYU in the Las Vegas Bowl, 35–28.

In 2006, the Bears recorded an eight-game win-streak, including five straight games scoring 40 or more points, rising as high as No. 8 in the AP poll, and remaining undefeated at home. The Bears finished the season with a 45–10 Holiday Bowl victory over Texas A&M, a No. 14 ranking, and an overall 10–3 record. The Bears were also co-champions of the Pac-10 for the first time since 1975. Following the season, Tedford signed a contract extension through 2013, which raised his base salary to $1.8 million per year and included significant performance and retention bonuses.

The 2007 campaign saw the Bears jump out to a 5–0 start and a No. 2 national ranking, Cal's highest since 1951. Set to move to No. 1 after LSU lost, Cal instead lost when freshman quarterback Kevin Riley—playing for the injured Nate Longshore—failed to get out of bounds for a game-tying field goal and time expired in a 31–28 home loss to Oregon State. This began a streak of losses in six of the seven final regular season games, including Tedford's first losses as head coach to Washington and Stanford to end the regular season. During the losing streak, Tedford's play-calling was the subject of criticism. Nevertheless, Cal was invited to a fifth straight bowl game for the first time in program history. Cal defeated Air Force 42–36 in the 2007 Armed Forces Bowl, giving Tedford and Cal a sixth-straight winning season.

In 2008, Tedford led the Bears to a 9–4 overall record and a perfect 7–0 record at home. Cal accepted an invitation to play in the 2008 Emerald Bowl, the program's sixth-straight bowl appearance, where they defeated Miami, 24–17. After the season, Tedford agreed to a two-year contract extension through 2015.

In 2009, the Bears went 8–5 and earned an invitation to the 2009 Poinsettia Bowl, which they lost to Utah, snapping a four-game bowl winning streak that dated back to 2004. The team also did not produce a 1,000 yard rusher for the first time since 2002.

The 2010 season saw Tedford surpass the legendary Pappy Waldorf to become the Cal head coach with the 3rd most career victories with a victory over UC Davis in the first game of the 2010 season. The team finished 5–7, Tedford's first losing season and the team's first losing season since 2001.

Tedford became Cal's all-time leader in victories with the third win of the 2011 season to surpass Andy Smith with 75 wins. The 2011 team improved to a 7–5 season record, and again produced a 1,000 yard rusher (Isi Sofele). However, 2012 was again a losing season, with the team finishing with a 3–9 record. Cal finished the final two games of the season with the worst losses of Tedford's career – a 59–17 home loss to Oregon followed by a 62–14 road loss against Oregon State. A few days after the final game of the season, Tedford was fired as head coach, but was owed $6.9 million over the remaining three years of his contract. The Golden Bears were only 2–5 at home at Memorial Stadium, which reopened that season after a $321 million renovation. In his final three seasons, he was 15–22, including 9–18 in conference games and 0–3 vs. Stanford. Since the loss of the 2007 game to Oregon State, Tedford was 34–37. In a letter to donors, Cal athletic director Sandy Barbour called a "great concern" the 48 percent graduation rate of football players at Cal who entered the school between 2002 and 2005; the rate was the lowest in the Pac-12.

Tedford left Cal with the most bowl wins (5), conference wins (50), and games coached (139) in the school's history. He also tied Pappy Waldorf for most Big Game wins (7) against Stanford. During his tenure, Cal produced 40 players drafted by the NFL, including eight first-round picks.

=== Tampa Bay Buccaneers ===
On January 4, 2014, newly hired head coach Lovie Smith selected Tedford to become the offensive coordinator for the Tampa Bay Buccaneers of the National Football League, which was his first position on an NFL staff.

==== Heart procedure ====
Tedford was with the team throughout the offseason, including the NFL draft, summer training camp, and the beginning of the 2014 preseason. After the Bucs' third preseason game in August, Tedford had a coronary angioplasty in which two stents were placed in an artery near his heart. He returned to part-time duty about two weeks later, serving as an "extra pair of eyes" for the offensive staff. Quarterbacks coach Marcus Arroyo, who had come to the Bucs from Cal with Tedford, assumed control of the offense.

Tedford planned to return to full-time duty in late September, but his health had not sufficiently improved, and on September 24, he and the team agreed that he should take an indefinite leave of absence. Meanwhile, the Bucs struggled to a 2–14 record, and their offense was ranked 30 out of 32 NFL teams.

On December 5, 2014, the Buccaneers released Tedford from his contract, allowing to him to seek other coaching opportunities. In a press release, Tedford thanked Coach Smith and the Buccaneers organization for their support and declared that he was "healthy now and feeling great."

=== BC Lions ===
On December 19, 2014, Tedford was named the new head coach of the BC Lions of the Canadian Football League. Tedford got his first win as a CFL head coach on July 10, 2015, over the Saskatchewan Roughriders to lift BC to a record of 1-1. After week 6 the Lions remained at .500 with 3 wins and 3 losses. Under Tedford's leadership the Lions struggled in the last 2/3rds of the season losing 8 of the remaining 12 games. Despite only having a record of 7-11 the Lions qualified for the playoffs where they were defeated by the defending champion Calgary Stampeders. Within the first couple weeks after being ousted from the playoffs, Ian Rapoport of the NFL Network reported that NCAA search firms had contacted Tedford about returning to the collegiate ranks. On December 2, 2015, Jeff Tedford announced that he had resigned his position as head coach of the BC Lions.

=== Washington ===
In 2016, Washington head coach Chris Petersen announced his hiring of Tedford, who served in an offensive consultant role for the Huskies.

=== Fresno State ===
On November 10, 2016, Tedford was announced as head coach of the Fresno State Bulldogs following the firing of Tim DeRuyter. In his first season, Tedford led a Bulldog team that won one game in 2016 to 10 wins in 2017 and an appearance in the Mountain West conference title game. In his second season, Tedford's Bulldogs set a school record of 12 wins, including beating Arizona State in the Las Vegas Bowl (31–20) and Boise State in the Mountain West conference championship (19–16).

Tedford resigned after the 2019 season for health reasons.

On December 8, 2021, Tedford was rehired by Fresno State to return to the head coach position for the 2022 season. On December 1, 2023, Tedford stepped away once more for health reasons. On July 15, 2024, Tedford announced he would step down as head coach due to health concerns.

== Head coaching record ==
=== College ===
Year	Team	Overall	Conference	Standing	Bowl/playoffs	Coaches^{#}	AP^{°}
California Golden Bears (Pacific-10/Pac-12 Conference) (2002–2012)
2002	California	7–5	4–4	T–4th			
2003	California	8–6	5–3	T–3rd	W Insight		
2004	California	10–2	7–1	2nd	L Holiday	9	9
2005	California	8–4	4–4	T–4th	W Las Vegas	25	25
2006	California	10–3	7–2	T–1st	W Holiday	14	14
2007	California	7–6	3–6	T–7th	W Armed Forces		
2008	California	9–4	6–3	4th	W Emerald	25	
2009	California	8–5	5–4	T–5th	L Poinsettia		
2010	California	5–7	3–6	8th			
2011	California	7–6	4–5	4th (North)	L Holiday		
2012	California	3–9	2–7	5th (North)			
California:		82–57	50–45				
Fresno State Bulldogs (Mountain West Conference) (2017–2019)
2017	Fresno State	10–4	7–1	1st (West)	W Hawaii		
2018	Fresno State	12–2	7–1	1st (West)	W Las Vegas	18	18
2019	Fresno State	4–8	2–6	T–4th (West)			
Fresno State Bulldogs (Mountain West Conference) (2022–2023)
2022	Fresno State	10–4	7–1	1st (West)	W LA	24	24
2023	Fresno State	9–4	4–4	T–6th	W New Mexico		
Fresno State:		45–22	27–13				
Total:		127–79					
National championship Conference title Conference division title or championship game berth
^{#}Rankings from final Coaches Poll.; ^{°}Rankings from final AP Poll.

=== CFL ===
Team	Year	Regular season					Postseason		
Team	Year	Won	Lost	Ties	Win %	Finish	Won	Lost	Result
BC	2015	7	11	0	.389	3rd in West Division	0	1	Lost in West Semi-Final

== Tedford's quarterbacks ==
Tedford is known as a cultivator of quarterbacks. Two of his pupils have achieved the highest success in the NFL: Super Bowl champions Trent Dilfer and Aaron Rodgers. Dilfer won Super Bowl XXXV with the Baltimore Ravens. Rodgers passed for over 4,000 yards in his first two fulltime seasons after waiting on the bench behind Brett Favre for three seasons and led the Green Bay Packers to a championship in Super Bowl XLV. Rodgers has received ten Pro Bowl invitations and has won the MVP award four times.

Joey Harrington, Akili Smith, David Carr, and Kyle Boller also had outstanding college careers and were first round picks in the NFL draft. However, Tedford failed to develop a star quarterback at Cal after Rodgers left following the 2004 season.

Tedford coached each of the following first round NFL draft picks at the quarterback position:

- Fresno State
  - Trent Dilfer 6th overall 1994, Tampa Bay Buccaneers
- Oregon
  - Akili Smith 3rd overall 1999, Cincinnati Bengals
  - Joey Harrington 3rd overall 2002, Detroit Lions
- California
  - Kyle Boller 19th overall 2003, Baltimore Ravens
  - Aaron Rodgers 24th overall 2005, Green Bay Packers

Tedford also coached NFL quarterbacks Billy Volek, A. J. Feeley, and Jake Haener.

Tedford also successfully recruited NFL quarterback Jared Goff, 1st overall 2016, Los Angeles Rams, but was fired before he had the opportunity to coach him at Cal.

== Tedford's running backs ==
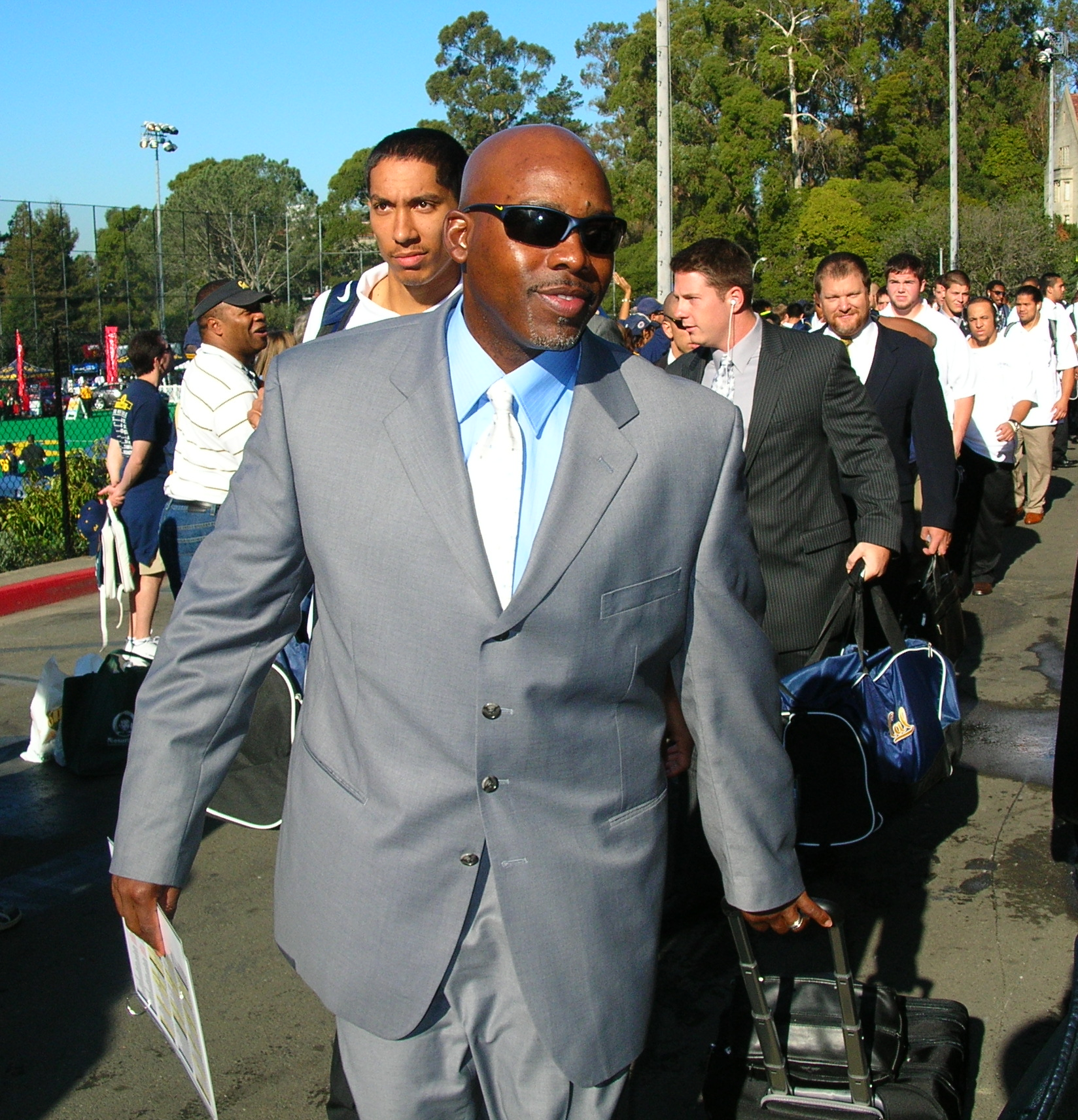
Ron Gould, the sole assistant coach to stay from previous head coach Tom Holmoe, in October 2008

Though known primarily for his quarterbacks, Tedford, along with running backs coach Ron Gould, produced eight 1,000-yard rushers during his tenure at Cal.

- 2002: Joe Igber (1,130 yards)
- 2003: Adimchinobi Echemandu (1,195 yards)
- 2004: J. J. Arrington (2,018 yards)
- 2005: Marshawn Lynch (1,246 yards)
- 2006: Marshawn Lynch (1,356 yards)
- 2007: Justin Forsett (1,546 yards)
- 2008: Jahvid Best (1,580 yards)
- 2010: Shane Vereen (1,167 yards)
- 2011: Isi Sofele (1,322 yards)

== Personal ==
Tedford and his wife Donna reside in Fresno, California. They have two sons, Taylor and Quinn, both of whom played football under their father at Cal.

== See also ==
- List of NCAA major college football yearly passing leaders
