= Larry Ray Willis =

American football player (born 1963)

No. 89
- Positions: Wide receiver, offensive specialist

Personal information
- Born: July 13, 1963 (age 63); Santa Monica, California, U.S.
- Listed height: 5 ft 10 in (1.78 m)
- Listed weight: 170 lb (77 kg)

Career information
- High school: Eaton (Eaton, Ohio)
- College: Fresno State
- NFL draft: 1985: undrafted

Career history
- Denver Broncos (1985); Calgary Stampeders (1986–1989); British Columbia Lions (1990); Edmonton Eskimos (1990); Winnipeg Blue Bombers (1991–1992); Toronto Argonauts (1993); Connecticut Coyotes (1996); New Jersey Red Dogs (1997–1998); Milwaukee Mustangs (1999)

Awards and highlights
- CFL West All-Star (1988); Third-team All-American (1984)
- Stats at ArenaFan.com

Larry Ray Willis (born July 13, 1963) is a former Canadian Football League (CFL) wide receiver who played nine seasons for five different teams from 1986 to 1993. He was also a former Arena Football League (AFL) offensive specialist who played for the Connecticut Coyotes in 1996, the New Jersey Gladiators from 1997 to 1998, and the Milwaukee Mustangs in 1999.
