= James Williams (cornerback) =

American football player and coach (born 1967)

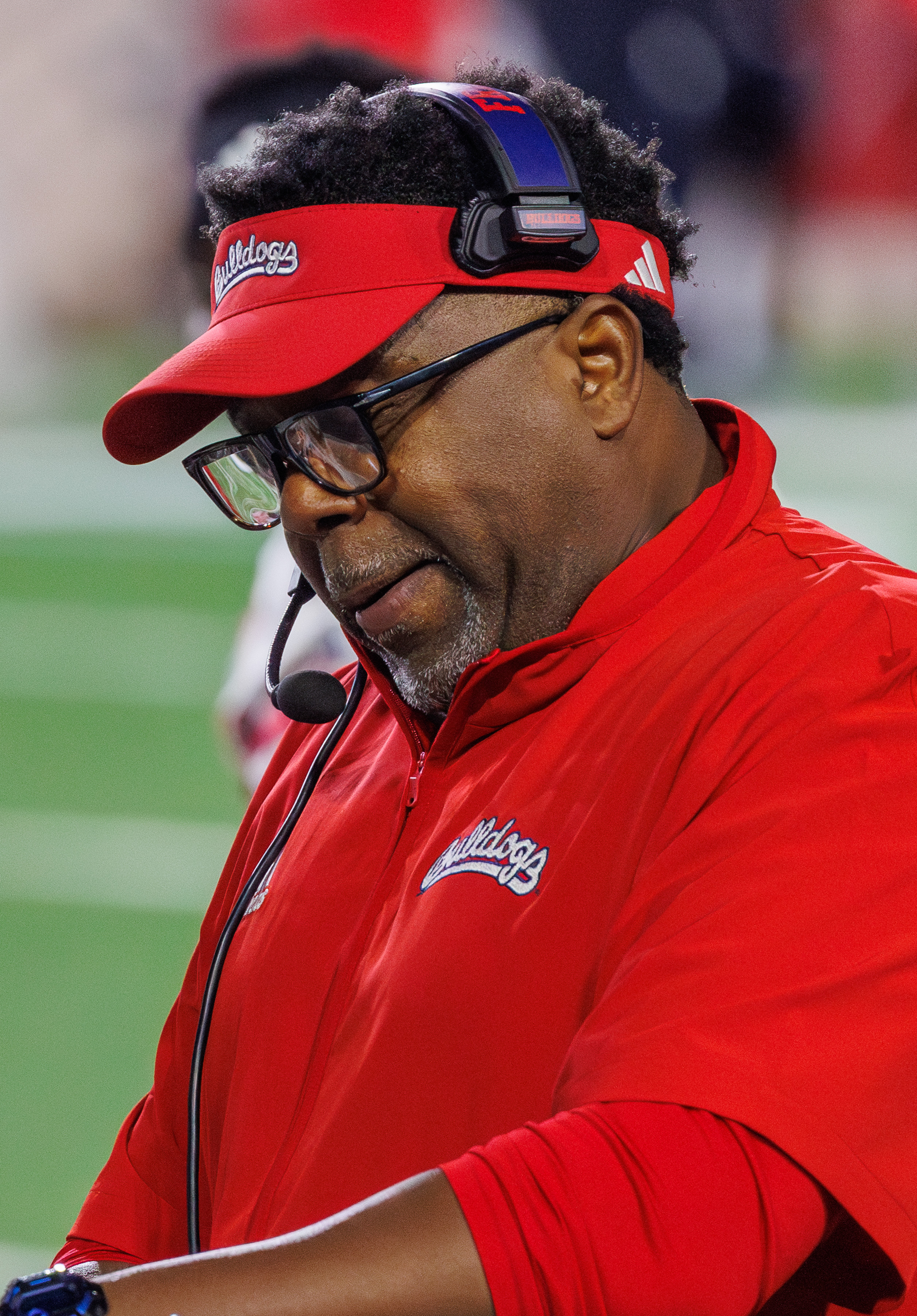
- Williams in 2024

Fresno State Bulldogs
- Title: Cornerbacks coach

Personal information
- Born: March 30, 1967 (age 59); Osceola, Arkansas, U.S.
- Listed height: 5 ft 10 in (1.78 m)
- Listed weight: 185 lb (84 kg)

Career information
- Position: Cornerback (No. 31, 29, 21, 27)
- High school: Coalinga (Coalinga, California)
- College: Fresno State
- NFL draft: 1990: 1st round, 16th overall pick

Career history

Playing
- Buffalo Bills (1990–1993); Arizona Cardinals (1994); Carolina Panthers (1995)*; San Francisco 49ers (1996)
- * Offseason or practice squad member only

Coaching
- Fresno State (1997) Graduate assistant; Cal Poly (1998) Defensive backs; San Jose State (1999) Defensive backs; Fresno State (2000–2001) Defensive backs; California (2002–2005) Defensive backs; Washington (2006–2008) Defensive backs; Utah (2009) Defensive backs; UNLV (2010–2011) Assistant head coach/defensive backs; UNLV (2012) Assistant head coach/defensive coordinator; Georgia State (2013–2014) Special teams coordinator/defensive backs; UNLV (2015–2016) Defensive backs; Fresno State (2017–2019) Defensive backs; Fresno State (2020–present) Cornerbacks

Awards and highlights
- PFWA All-Rookie Team (1990); Third-team All-American (1989)

Career NFL statistics
- Interceptions: 11
- Forced fumbles: 1
- Fumble recoveries: 4
- Tackles: 134
- Stats at Pro Football Reference

James Earl "J.D." Williams (born March 30, 1967) is an American football coach and former cornerback who is the cornerbacks coach for the Fresno State Bulldogs. He played college football at Fresno State and was selected by the Buffalo Bills in the first round of the 1990 NFL draft. Williams played in six NFL seasons, from 1990 to 1994 and 1996 for the Bills, Arizona Cardinals, and San Francisco 49ers.

Williams was most notable for being the first player on the Buffalo Bills squad to don number 31, which had been "retired" to represent the spirit of the franchise. Since Williams wore the number, the Bills have allowed anyone to wear the 31 jersey; it was later worn by Dwayne Wright, who like Williams, went to Fresno State. Jairus Byrd wore the number before becoming a free agent; he used it because his college number, 32, was unofficially retired because of O. J. Simpson.

After retiring from football, Williams became a football coach beginning in 1997 as a graduate assistant at Fresno State.

Pre-draft measurables
Height	Weight	Arm length	Hand span	40-yard dash	10-yard split	20-yard split	20-yard shuttle	Vertical jump	Broad jump	Bench press
5 ft 9 7/8 in (1.77 m)	172 lb (78 kg)	29 3/4 in (0.76 m)	8 1/4 in (0.21 m)	4.34 s	1.55 s	2.54 s	4.03 s	38.0 in (0.97 m)	10 ft 9 in (3.28 m)	9 reps
