= Paul Pinegar =

American football player (born 1982)

Profile
- Position: Quarterback

Personal information
- Born: March 10, 1982 (age 44)

Career information
- High school: Woodland (Woodland, California)
- College: Fresno State (2001–2005)
- NFL draft: 2006: undrafted

Career history
- Jacksonville Jaguars (2006)*
- * Offseason or practice squad member only

Awards and highlights
- First-team All-WAC (2005)

Paul Pinegar (born March 10, 1982) is an American former football quarterback. He played college football for the Fresno State Bulldogs, and signed with the Jacksonville Jaguars as an undrafted free agent in 2006.

== Early life ==
Paul Pinegar was born on March 10, 1982. He played high school football at Woodland High School in Woodland, California. He played his senior year with a torn thumb ligament, completing 89-of-167 passes for 1,520 yards, 15 touchdowns and six interceptions in nine contests. Pinegar recorded two-year totals of 167 completions on 327 attempts for 3,136 yards, 37 touchdowns, and 10 interceptions while earning first-team All-Delta League honors both years.

== College career ==
Pinegar enrolled at California State University, Fresno to play college football for the Fresno State Bulldogs. He joined the football team for spring drills in 2000 but ended up sitting out the entire season. He was then redshirted in 2001. Pinegar began his redshirt freshman year in 2002 as the backup to Jeff Grady but took over as starter after Grady suffered an injury. Pinegar played in all 14 games, starting 12, completing 230 of 403 passes (57.1%) for 2,929 yards, 20 touchdowns, and ten interceptions while also scoring a rushing touchdown. He led all freshmen in the country in passing touchdowns and passer rating, while also setting school single-season freshman records in passing yards and passing touchdowns. He was named a Sporting News freshman All-American and the Western Athletic Conference (WAC) Freshman of the Year.

Pinegar missed the first six games of the 2003 season due to a torn right pectoral muscle. He made his season debut off the bench in relief of Jeff Grady, and started the next eight games to close out the year. Pinegar started all 12 games in 2004. He was named the MVP of the 2004 MPC Computers Bowl after throwing for 235 yards, five touchdowns, and no interceptions. With the victory, Pinegar became one of only seven quarterbacks in NCAA history to win three straight bowl games.

As a senior in 2005, Pinegar completed 265 of 416 passes (63.7%) for 3,335 yards, 30 touchdowns, and 15 interceptions while also rushing for three touchdowns. He garnered first-team All-WAC recognition for his performance during the 2005 season. He set the school career record for passing touchdowns with 84. He was also only the second player in school history to throw for over 10,000 yards (10,136).

== Professional career ==
Pinegar was invited to the NFL Combine. After going undrafted in the 2006 NFL draft, he signed with the Jacksonville Jaguars on April 30, 2006. On August 12, it was reported that Pinegar had been released by the Jaguars to make room for tight end Greg Estandia, whom the team signed after tight end Marcedes Lewis suffered an injury.
