= Walt Richardson =

American singer-songwriter

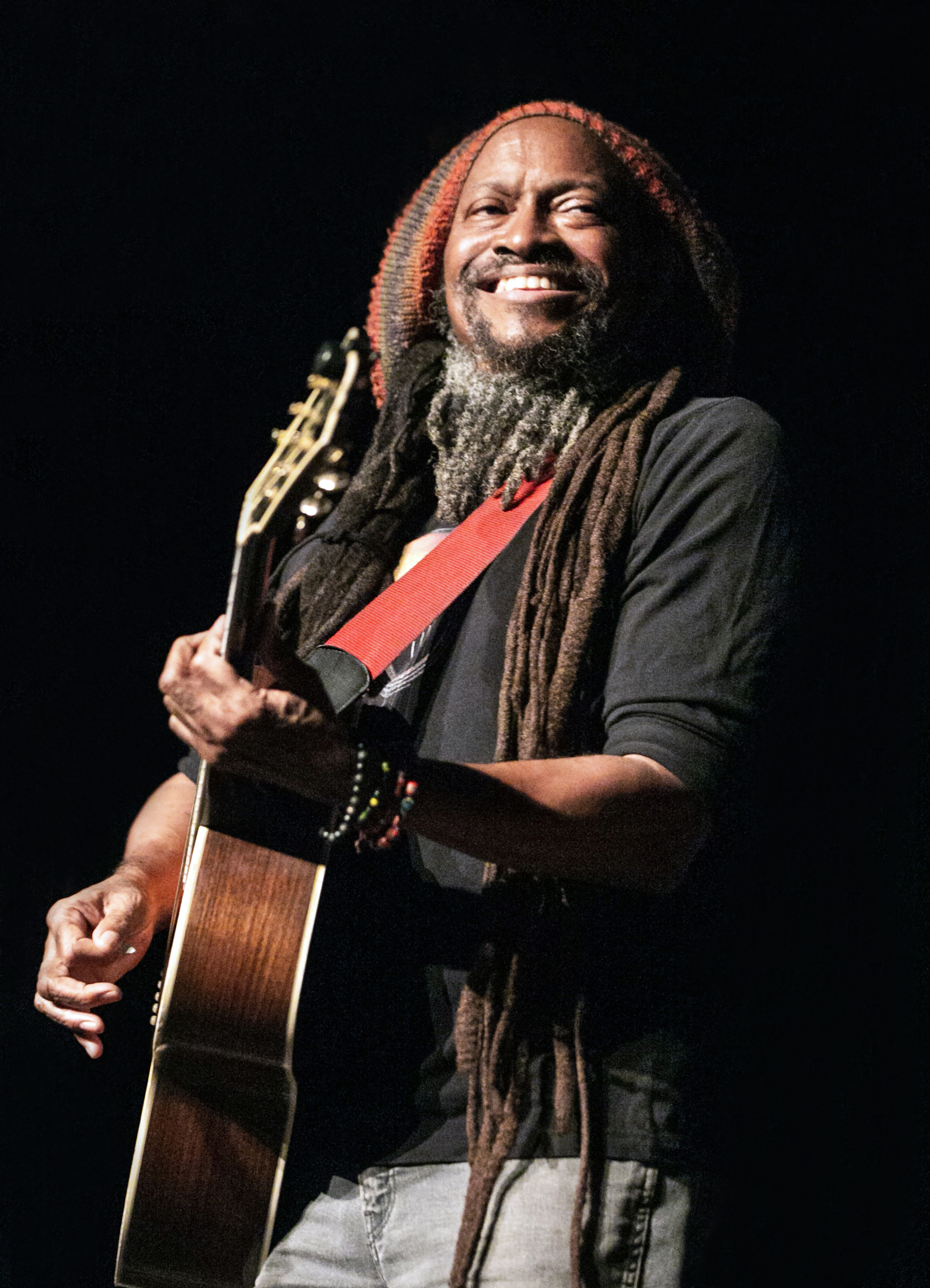
- Richardson performing in 2018
- Born: January 21, 1954 (age 72); Fort Walton Beach, Florida, U.S.
- Occupations: Singer-songwriter, musician
- Years active: 1976–present
- Musical career
- Genres: Folk, rock, reggae, worldbeat, motown, funk, R&B
- Instruments: Vocals, guitar, bass, piano
- Website: WaltRichardson.com

Walt Richardson is an American singer-songwriter and guitarist born in Fort Walton Beach, Florida. He is a celebrated music veteran in the Tempe, Arizona area where his humanitarian contributions to the music community and music in schools (with an emphasis on cultural diversity) have been recognized with numerous awards.

== Early life and education ==
Richardson was born at Eglin Air Force Base in Fort Walton Beach, Florida, on January 21, 1954, where his father, Chief Master Sergeant, Walter Harold Richardson, was stationed in the Air Force. Richardson Sr. was one of the first 1,000 African-Americans to integrate the Air Force and was later recognized in 2010 as one of the original Tuskegee Airmen. He served in Vietnam and was a recipient of the Congressional Gold Medal.

Richardson's father was an entertainer in the Tuskegee Airman singing group, Operation Happiness, composed of pilots, which entertained troops. He also performed with Bob Hope in USO shows and encouraged Walt to learn to play the piano. As a first communion gift, Walt's parents bought him a piano and he took several years of piano lessons. He bought himself a guitar from Spiegel's catalog from money earned by mowing lawns, when he was ten years old, and soon put together a mock band with his sisters as go-go dancers.

As a child of a military father, Richardson attended many schools both nationally and internationally beginning with elementary school in Japan and graduating high school at Clark Air Base in the Philippines in 1972. Richardson's family moved back to Florida in 1972 where he earned his associate degree at Pensacola State College in 1974 and then moved to Tempe, Arizona to attend Arizona State University where he earned his bachelor's degree in 1976.

== Music career ==
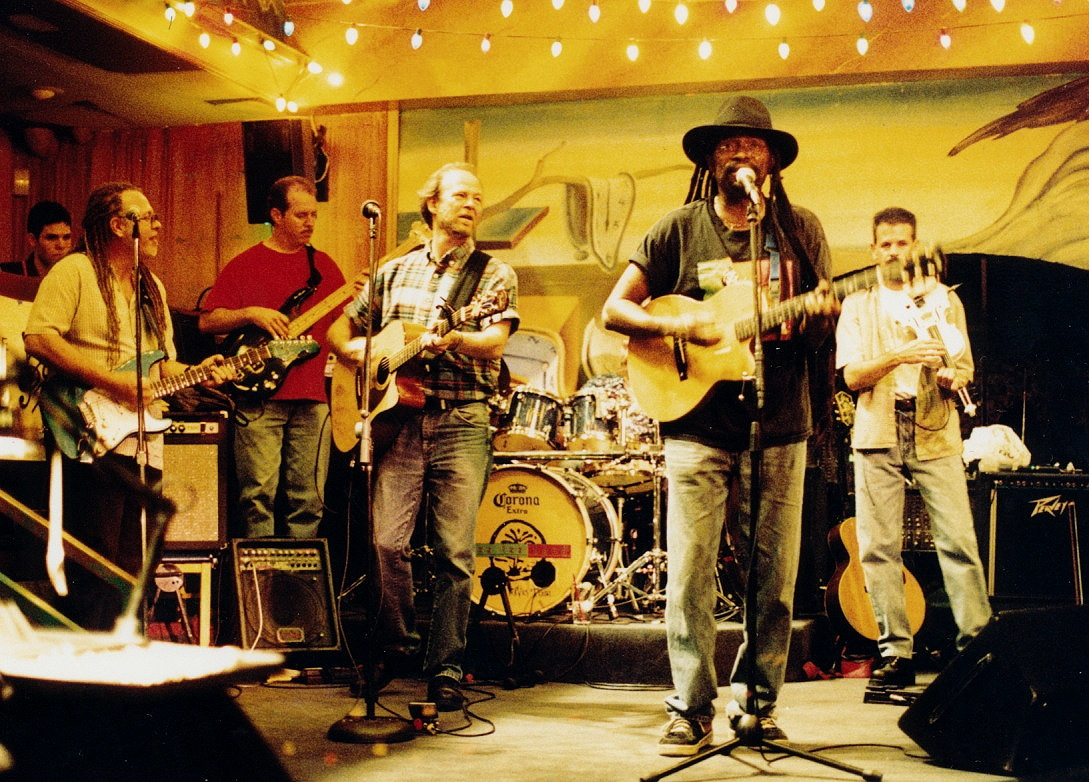
Walt Richardson & the Morningstar Band, Tempe, Arizona, USA, April 2000

Richardson's early musical influences were The Beatles, Jimi Hendrix, Cat Stevens, Bob Dylan, Creedence Clearwater, Sly and The Family Stone, Bob Marley, and Stevie Wonder.

During his high school years in the Philippines, Richardson put together his first band Counterclockwise Predicament. It was made up mostly of military kids performing at high school events.

His family moved back to the US in the early 1970s settling back in Florida where Richardson attended Pensacola College. He continued honing in on his skills on the guitar and writing songs. After graduating he was accepted at Arizona State University.

Richardson began performing at local open-mic's and as a street performer while attending Arizona State University. In the mid-seventies he met Aziz Chadley who introduced him to the Reggae sound and soon they put together the band Driftwood (Ronnie Scott, Rudy Chavez, Calvin Lewis, Vinnie I, Aziz Chadley) with Richardson being the main songwriter as well as performing reggae cover songs.

Playing at the original Chuy's in Tempe, in the mid-eighties, Driftwood would hold jam sessions on stage, eventually rebuilding the band and naming it Morning Star (Kurt Moorehead, Spider, Hannes Kvaran, Felix Sainz, Emilio Santiago, Aziz Chadley, Plato T Jones). The band toured extensively in the US and in three-to-eight week tours during the summer and fall, as a part of the Miller Band Network in 1991 and 1992 including international festivals where they shared the stage with artists such as Carlos Santana, Ziggy Marley and the Melody Makers, Third World, Steel Pulse, Burning Spear, and more. Morning Star released three albums, Morning Star, Double Bridge, and Another Way. Due to the band members having different goals, the band split up in 1997 and Richardson took some time off.

Richardson then began focusing on performing as a solo artist and with various musicians in the Walt Richardson band and Walt Richardson and Friends. He performs regularly in the Phoenix, Arizona area with an emphasis on performing in Tempe, Arizona.

== Film, television, and radio ==
With his belief that music is a means of healing for humanity, Richardson reached out to the City of Tempe to create festivals raising money for nonprofit organizations. This idea soon became the TV show Songwriter's Showcase at Tempe Center for the Arts, which Richardson hosts. The show airs on PBS affiliate KAET and Tempe Channel 11.

Richardson hosts the weekly world music program, My World of Music on Radio Phoenix, a nationally syndicated radio station providing an eclectic programming mix featuring independent news, culture and music content curated by local, regional, national and international producers.

Richardson is an avid supporter of the music community, performing live music and being interviewed by his alma mater, Arizona State University PBS television station's, KAET on numerous occasions speaking about topics involving the history of the music scene in Phoenix and Tempe, Arizona.

== Discography ==
Year	Title	Label	Artist(s)
1985	Morning Star	Independent	Morning Star
1987	Double Bridge	Independent	Walt Richardson and the Morning Star Band
1991	Another Way	Independent	Walt Richardson and the Morning Star Band
1998	Silent Artist	Independent	Walt Richardson and Hannes Kvaran
2016	Coming Alive	Fervor Records	Walt Richardson and the Morning Star Band
