= Kevin Sweeney (American football) =

American football player (born 1963)

No. 19, 7
- Position: Quarterback

Personal information
- Born: November 16, 1963 (age 62); Bozeman, Montana, U.S.
- Listed height: 6 ft 0 in (1.83 m)
- Listed weight: 191 lb (87 kg)

Career information
- High school: Fresno Bullard (Fresno, California)
- College: Fresno State (1983–1986)
- NFL draft: 1987: 7th round, 180th overall pick

Career history
- Dallas Cowboys (1987–1988); San Francisco 49ers (1989)*; Montreal Machine (1991)
- * Offseason or practice squad member only

Awards and highlights
- 2× PCAA Co-Most Valuable Player (1985, 1986); 2× PCAA Offensive Player of the Year (1985, 1986); 2× First-team All-PCAA (1985, 1986); Fresno State Bulldogs No. 9 retired

Career NFL statistics
- Passing attempts: 106
- Passing completions: 47
- Completion percentage: 44.3%
- TD–INT: 7–6
- Passing yards: 605
- Passer rating: 61.2
- Stats at Pro Football Reference

Kevin Joseph Sweeney (born November 16, 1963) is an American former professional football player who was a quarterback for the Dallas Cowboys of the National Football League (NFL) . He played college football for the Fresno State Bulldogs.

== Early life ==
Sweeney attended Bullard High School, where he was a standout quarterback. As a senior, he broke Pat Haden's state record for touchdown passes in a season with 35 and received Northern California offensive player of the year honors.

His older brother Jim was recruiting him for the University of Washington, while his father Jim Sweeney was doing the same for Fresno State University.

== College career ==
Sweeney accepted a scholarship from Fresno State University to be coached by his father and replace at quarterback the graduated Jeff Tedford. He worked with Steve DeBerg, whom he credited with helping him most with his throwing motion.

He was a four-year starter, played in 46 contests and missed only one half of a game in his career, even playing as a senior with a left dislocated shoulder that required surgery at the end of the season.

As a sophomore, he passed for 3,259 yards and 20 touchdowns, leading the nation's highest scoring offense (39.1 points per game). The next year, he threw for 2,604 yards and 14 touchdowns, while helping his team finish as the only Division I unbeaten school (11–0–1). He also had a career long 95-yard touchdown pass against Oregon State University.

As a senior, he had the lowest interception percentage (2.37) among the top 25 rated passers and set a conference mark with a career-high 4 touchdown passes against New Mexico State University. He became the NCAA most prolific passer after breaking Doug Flutie's record for passing yards in a career (10,623 yards). He shared the NCAA mark for most games of 200 or more passing yards (31), had the conference's career records for touchdowns (66) and completions (781).

=== College statistics ===
- 1983: 166/334 for 2,359 yards with 16 TD vs 19 INT
- 1984: 227/421 for 3,259 yards with 20 TD vs 13 INT
- 1985: 177/295 for 2,604 yards with 14 TD vs 7 INT
- 1986: 160/284 for 2,363 yards with 15 TD vs 9 INT

In 2000, the school retired his number 9 jersey. In 2002, he was inducted into the Fresno Athletic Hall of Fame.

== Professional career ==
=== Dallas Cowboys ===
Sweeney was selected by the Dallas Cowboys in the seventh round (180th overall) of the 1987 NFL draft, after dropping because of his height. It was also a type of homecoming, as he was a ballboy at the Cowboys' Thousand Oaks training camp growing up. He couldn't pass Paul McDonald on the depth chart and was waived on September 7.

After the players went on a strike on the third week of the 1987 season, those games were canceled (reducing the 16-game season to 15) and the NFL decided that the games would be played with replacement players. In September, he was re-signed to be a part of the Dallas Cowboys replacement team, that was given the mock name "Rhinestone Cowboys" by the media. In his first game against the New York Jets, he became the third ever rookie quarterback to start for the Cowboys, following Don Meredith (1960) and Roger Staubach (1969). In the second game against the Philadelphia Eagles, he only played in the first half, giving way to Danny White and Loren Snyder in the second half of a 41–22 win. His 77-yard touchdown pass to Cornell Burbage against the Eagles was the team's longest completion of the season. When White took over the team for the third replacement game against the Washington Redskins, the crowd started chanting "We Want Sweeney, We Want Sweeney" when the team didn't perform well in the eventual 13–7 loss. He was a very popular player with the fans during those games; accounting for 291 passing yards, 4 touchdown passes, 20.8 yards per completion, one interception, 2 wins and a 109.3 rating in passing efficiency (led all replacement players). He was kept on the roster for the rest of the year.

In 1988, he was the third-string quarterback behind White and Steve Pelluer. On November 6, he started the second half and passed for three touchdowns against the New York Giants. The next game, he was given the opportunity to start against the Minnesota Vikings, but lost 43–3 after completing just 10 of 28 passes for 93 yards, with 2 interceptions and 2 fumbles.

In 1989, with the arrival of new head coach Jimmy Johnson and with the team also intending to draft a quarterback, he was left unprotected in Plan B free agency.

=== San Francisco 49ers ===
On March 27, 1989, Sweeney signed with the San Francisco 49ers as a Plan B free agent. He was released before the start of the season on August 26.

=== Montreal Machine (WLAF) ===
In 1991, he signed with the Montreal Machine of the World League of American Football, where he was named the starter at quarterback, before being passed on the depth chart by Michael Proctor. He played in 10 games, making 24 completions out of 69 attempts for 219 yards, one touchdown and 3 interceptions.

== Personal life ==
Sweeney is a senior vice president at Wells Fargo Bank.
