= Josh Harper =

American gridiron football player (born 1991)

Profile
- Position: Wide receiver

Personal information
- Born: December 1, 1991 (age 34); San Jose California, U.S.
- Listed height: 6 ft 1 in (1.85 m)
- Listed weight: 185 lb (84 kg)

Career information
- High school: Stockton (CA) St. Mary's
- College: Fresno State
- NFL draft: 2015: undrafted

Career history
- Oakland Raiders (2015)*; Calgary Stampeders (2016)*
- * Offseason or practice squad member only

Awards and highlights
- First-team All-MWC (2014); Second-team All-MWC (2013)

Josh Harper (born December 1, 1991) is an American former professional football wide receiver. He played college football with Fresno State.

== Early life ==
Harper attended St. Mary's High School in Stockton, California, where he played football, basketball and ran track. He played numerous positions including wide receiver, safety, running back, punt returner and kick returner for the St. Mary's Rams football team. He finished his high school career with 164 receptions for 2,669 yards and 28 receiving touchdowns. In track & field, Harper competed as a sprinter, recording personal-best times of 12.04 seconds in the 100-meter dash and 24.22 seconds in the 200-meter dash.

Harper was ranked by Rivals.com as a three-star recruit. He was recruited by Cal, Arizona, Arizona State, Nevada, Oregon, Oregon State, Stanford, UCLA, Washington and Washington State.

== College career ==
Harper was redshirted as a freshman at Fresno State University in 2010. As redshirt freshman in 2011, he played in 11 games with three starts and recorded 35 receptions for 497 yards and five touchdowns. As a sophomore in 2012, Harper played in only five games due to injuries. He finished the season with 24 receptions for 333 yards and four touchdowns. As a junior in 2013, he had 79 receptions for 1,011 yards and 13 touchdowns in 11 games. Harper entered his senior season in 2014 as a starter.

== Professional career ==
Pre-draft measurables
Height	Weight	Arm length	Hand span	40-yard dash	10-yard split	20-yard split	20-yard shuttle	Three-cone drill	Vertical jump	Broad jump	Bench press
6 ft 0 7/8 in (1.85 m)	191 lb (87 kg)	30 7/8 in (0.78 m)	8 3/4 in (0.22 m)	4.52 s	1.55 s	2.48 s	4.36 s	7.15 s	33.5 in (0.85 m)	9 ft 0 in (2.74 m)	13 reps
All values from NFL Combine/Pro Day

=== Oakland Raiders ===
After going undrafted in the 2015 NFL draft, Harper signed with the Oakland Raiders on May 8, 2015. On September 1, 2015, he was waived by the Raiders.

=== Calgary Stampeders ===
On June 13, 2016, Harper signed with the Calgary Stampeders. On June 19, 2016, he was released by the Stampeders.

== Personal life ==
He is the youngest of nine children born to Willie Harper, who played in the NFL as an outside linebacker.

He is uncle of the rapper Saweetie and first cousin of actor Gabrielle Union.
