= Ron Rivers =

American football player (born 1971)

No. 34, 20
- Position: Running back

Personal information
- Born: November 13, 1971 (age 54); Elizabeth, New Jersey, U.S.
- Listed height: 5 ft 8 in (1.73 m)
- Listed weight: 205 lb (93 kg)

Career information
- High school: San Gorgonio
- College: Fresno State
- NFL draft: 1994: undrafted

Career history
- San Diego Chargers (1994)*; Detroit Lions (1994–1999); Atlanta Falcons (2000); Pittsburgh Steelers (2001)*
- * Offseason or practice squad member only

Awards and highlights
- First-team All-WAC (1993)

Career NFL statistics
- Rushing yards: 749
- Rushing average: 4.3
- Rushing touchdowns: 3
- Stats at Pro Football Reference

Ron Rivers (born November 13, 1971) is an American former professional football player who was a running back for six seasons with the Detroit Lions and Atlanta Falcons of the National Football League (NFL). Rivers played college football for the Fresno State Bulldogs, rushing for 3,473 yards and 28 touchdowns in three seasons, with an average of over 6 yards per carry. He also caught 56 passes for 558 yards and another touchdown, and returned 19 kickoffs for 357 yards. Rivers went on to play six seasons in the NFL, recording 1,490 all-purpose yards and 4 touchdowns.

Rivers' son, Ronnie Rivers, also attended California State University, Fresno, where he broke his father's school record for touchdowns (52) and recorded 5,028 all-purpose yards. After going undrafted in 2022, Ronnie Rivers signed as a free agent with the Arizona Cardinals.

== Professional career ==
Pre-draft measurables
Height	Weight	Arm length	Hand span	40-yard dash	10-yard split	20-yard split	20-yard shuttle	Vertical jump	Broad jump	Bench press
5 ft 7 7/8 in (1.72 m)	203 lb (92 kg)	27 7/8 in (0.71 m)	9 1/2 in (0.24 m)	4.68 s	1.58 s	2.68 s	4.20 s	29.5 in (0.75 m)	8 ft 9 in (2.67 m)	20 reps
All values from NFL Combine
