= Tom Brandstater =

American football player (born 1984)

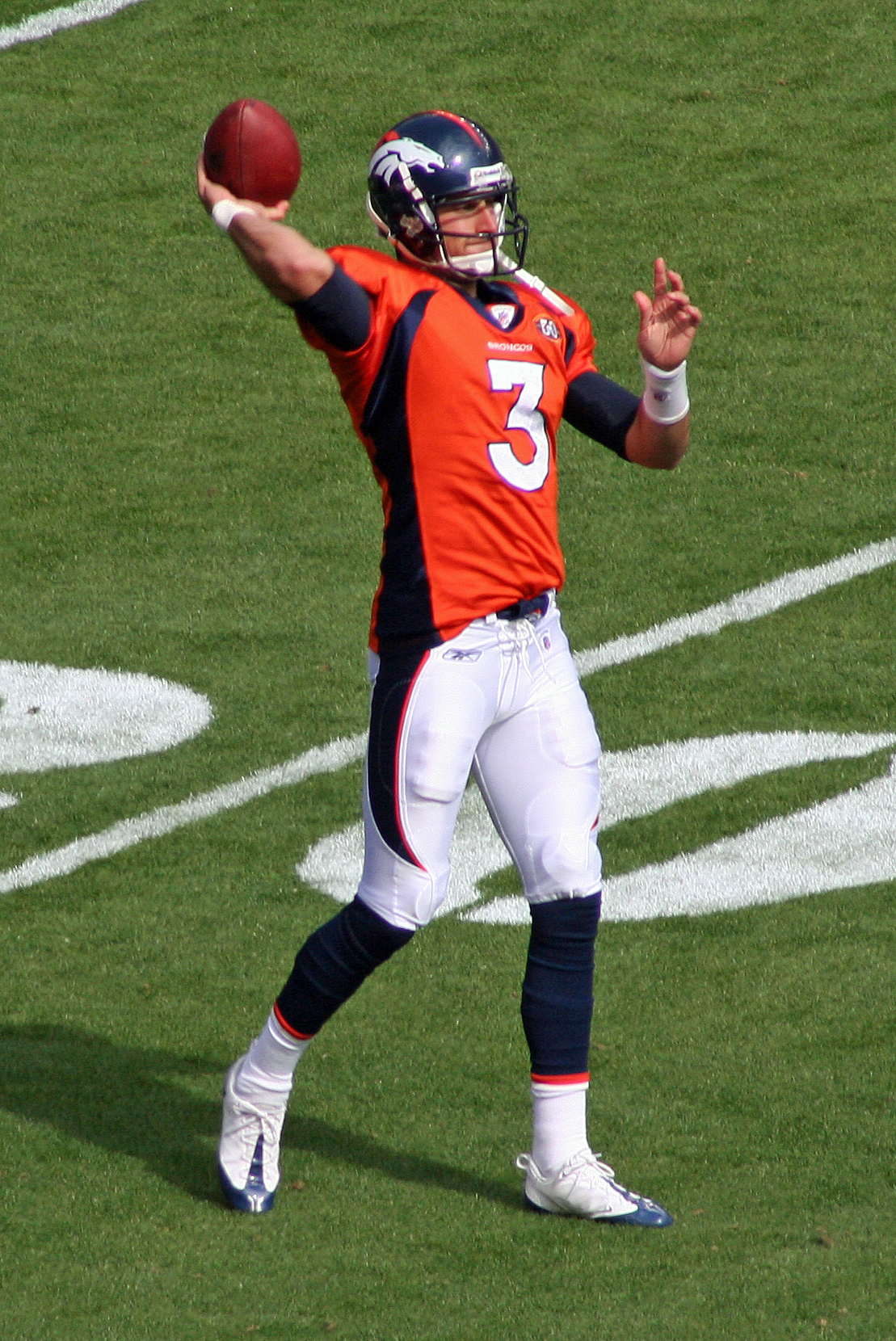
- Brandstater with the Denver Broncos in 2009

No. 3, 12
- Position: Quarterback

Personal information
- Born: October 21, 1984 (age 42); Turlock, California, U.S.
- Listed height: 6 ft 5 in (1.96 m)
- Listed weight: 223 lb (101 kg)

Career information
- High school: Turlock
- College: Fresno State
- NFL draft: 2009: 6th round, 174th overall pick

Career history
- Denver Broncos (2009); Indianapolis Colts (2010)*; Miami Dolphins (2010–2011)*; Dallas Cowboys (2011)*; St. Louis Rams (2011)
- * Offseason or practice squad member only

Career NFL statistics
- TD–INT: 0–0
- Passing yards: 0
- Passer rating: 39.6
- Completions / Attempts: 0 / 2
- Stats at Pro Football Reference

Thomas Brandstater (born October 21, 1984) is an American former professional football player who was a quarterback in the National Football League (NFL). He played college football for the Fresno State Bulldogs. He was selected by the Denver Broncos in the sixth round of the 2009 NFL draft.

He was also a member of the Indianapolis Colts, Miami Dolphins, Dallas Cowboys, and St. Louis Rams.

== Early life ==
Tom Brandstater was born and raised in Turlock, California, a town in Stanislaus County. He is the first son and second child of William and Sharen Brandstater and has three siblings. He began playing football at the age of eight with the Turlock Vikings Youth Football program, where he lists Mike Hibden and Mike Huber as his most influential youth coaches.

Several other WAC teammates and opponents, notably Colin Kaepernick of the Nevada Wolf Pack and fellow Fresno State Bulldog Anthony Harding, also played for the youth football program. He was the starting quarterback from the age of eight, but also played other positions.

Brandstater attended Turlock High School. He achieved several distinctions as a high school player, including being named to the First-team All District team by the Modesto Bee as a defensive back, and guiding Turlock to the San Joaquin Section Division I South championship against Stockton Lincoln High. As a high school quarterback, he directed an offense that was primarily focused on rushing and did not display his true passing ability, though he still threw for over 1,000 yards in his last season in high school. He was the top quarterback in Fresno State's Summer Football Camp in 2003.

== College career ==
=== 2004 season ===
As a freshman at California State University, Fresno, Brandstater was given a redshirt year so he did not play during the team's 2004 season. He served as the quarterback for the scout team in practice against the starting defense. During this time, he was officially listed as the number three quarterback behind Paul Pinegar and Jordan Chrisensen. Brandstater did not play in any games during the season, as coach Pat Hill elected to keep him on the bench so that 2004 did not count as one of his four years of eligibility.

=== 2005 season ===
After redshirting as a true freshman, Brandstater became the backup quarterback to Paul Pinegar in 2005, and was occasionally brought in by Coach Hill in late quarters of games where the Bulldogs had a blowout lead. In the season opener on September 10, 2005, he was brought in late against Weber State, completing 2 out of 4 attempts for 11 yards with a touchdown. He was also credited with a single rushing attempt, for a loss of two yards; this was to be his only rushing attempt of the season. He did not play in the next game, a close away loss to Oregon, and was brought out late in the 44–14 home victory against Toledo, where he attempted a single pass, which went for an incompletion. His next game was against Utah State, where he went 3 for 6 for 36 yards. He played his last game of the season in November against the San José State Spartans, where he completed a single pass for a two-yard gain. As Pinegar's backup, Brandstater played in eight games, completed 6 of 13 passes for 49 yards, with one touchdown and an interception.

=== 2006 season ===
The 2005 season ended with three losses, including a Liberty Bowl loss to Tulsa, along with a number of losses of senior leadership, including senior quarterback Paul Pinegar and running back Wendell Mathis, both of whom were 2nd in the WAC in passing efficiency and rushing yards per game, respectively. Offensive coordinator Frank Cignetti, Jr., who had led the Bulldogs to two consecutive top ten finishes in NCAA scoring offense in 2004 and 2005, left for North Carolina, and was replaced for the 2006 season by Steve Hagen, the second offensive coordinator to work with Pinegar in as many seasons as a Bulldog. Fresno State opened the 2006 season at home against Nevada on September 1, 2006, and Brandstater passed for 124 yards with a touchdown in his first start with Fresno State, getting revenge for the upset loss the previous season and adding interest to the 83-year-old rivalry. The next week brought a home game against the Oregon Ducks on Sep 9, with Oregon entering the game ranked #20. Brandstater went 16 of 33 attempts for 150 yards, with a touchdown and two interceptions, as Fresno State lost to the Ducks on account of several special teams errors.

The remainder of the season turned out to be problematic for the Bulldogs and Brandstater, as the team proceeded to lose the next six games, including a loss to Utah State. On Oct 14 against Hawaii, Coach Hill replaced Brandstater in the second quarter with his backup, Sean Norton, as the Bulldogs lost to the Warriors 68–37 at home. In the next game against LSU, Brandstater did not play. He returned to go 7 of 14 with 72 yards against Boise State, and proceeded to lead the Bulldogs to victories in the next three games against New Mexico State, Idaho, and Louisiana Tech. He started in the season finale at San José State, a loss, but the Bulldogs did end the season with some momentum heading into the 2007 season.

=== 2007 season ===
Brandstater led the 2007 Fresno State Bulldogs football team to a 9-4 season, capped by back-to-back victories over BCS opponents Kansas State and Georgia Tech in the Humanitarian Bowl where Tom earned The Most Valuable Player award.

=== 2008 season ===
Going into the 2008 season, the Bulldogs found themselves ranked in several national preseason polls, including Athlon Sports, ranking the Bulldogs #25, CBS Sportsline ranking the team #24, and ESPN ranking them at #21. Brandstater returned for his senior year along with 17 returning starters. He was listed as a darkhorse Heisman Trophy candidate, and was rated number 6 out of 129 quarterbacks going into 2008 by nfldraftscout.com.

On July 17, 2008, the Tom O'Brien Watch List was released by the Davey O'Brien Foundation and its National Selection Committee highlighting 31 quarterbacks vying for the award honoring the nation's best quarterback for the 2008 football season, and Brandstater was listed alongside other top prospects.

Brandstater was the starting quarterback for the Fresno State Bulldogs as they opened their 2008 season against Rutgers in New Brunswick, New Jersey in a non-conference away game on Labor Day. Behind Brandstater, Fresno State opened the game slowly, with neither team scoring any points in the first half. The Fresno State offense was only able to muster 102 yards and six first downs in the first half, but the defense was able to keep the Scarlet Knights from getting any points on the board. . The Bulldogs would go on to score three touchdowns and a field goal, with all three touchdowns run into the end zone by running back Ryan Mathews. Brandstater completed the game with 11 completions on 24 attempts for a total of 216 yards and a quarterback rating of 121.4.

=== College statistics ===
		Passing								Rushing		
Season	Team	GP	Rating	Att	Comp	Pct	Yds	TD	INT	Att	Yds	TD
2005	Fresno State Bulldogs	8	122.3	22	6	55.3	48	2	2	1	-2	0
2006	Fresno State Bulldogs	11	106.74	268	146	54.5	1490	13	14	32	86	1
2007	Fresno State Bulldogs	13	140.48	337	211	62.6	2654	15	5	48	118	3
2008	Fresno State Bulldogs	13	129.4	371	221	59.6	2664	18	12	51	-50	0
	Totals	45	126.50	989	584	59.0	6,857	47	32	132	152	4

== Professional career ==
=== Denver Broncos ===
The Denver Broncos selected Brandstater in the sixth round (174th overall) of the 2009 NFL draft. On July 26, 2009, Brandstater signed a four-year, $1.60 million contract with a $124,000 signing bonus. He would have earned an additional $2.285 million through final-year escalators. His base salary was $400,000 in 2009, and would have been $395,000 in 2010, $480,000 in 2011, and $565,000 in 2012. The Broncos acquired Tim Tebow through the 2010 NFL draft and brought in Brady Quinn from the Cleveland Browns, and therefore they released Brandstater on June 4, 2010.

=== Indianapolis Colts ===
The Colts released their injured backup quarterback Jim Sorgi on March 5, 2010, and signed Brandstater off waivers on June 7, 2010, as the backup to Peyton Manning. On September 4, 2010, the Colts waived Brandstater, retaining Curtis Painter as the second string QB, and placing Brandstater on their practice squad on September 6, 2010. The Colts released Brandstater from the practice squad on September 29, 2010.

=== Miami Dolphins ===
Brandstater was signed to the Miami Dolphins practice squad on November 15, 2010 following injuries to their first and second-string quarterbacks, Chad Henne and Chad Pennington. At the end of the 2010 season, he was signed to a contract. He was waived on August 5, 2011.

=== Dallas Cowboys ===
Brandstater signed with the Dallas Cowboys on August 6, 2011, but was waived on September 3.

=== St. Louis Rams ===
The St. Louis Rams signed him to their practice squad on September 13, 2011. He was promoted to the active roster, released from the team, re-signed to the practice squad, and once again promoted to the active roster during the 2011 season.

On January 1, 2012 Brandstater played in the 4th quarter of the Week 17 game between the Rams and the San Francisco 49ers. After Kellen Clemens was injured on a second down sack at the hands of linebacker NaVorro Bowman, Brandstater saw his first career NFL action with two incomplete passes. He was released by the Rams on September 1, 2012.
