= Anthony Daigle =

American football player (born 1970)

No. 23
- Position: Running back

Personal information
- Born: April 5, 1970 (age 56); San Francisco, California, U.S.
- Listed height: 5 ft 10 in (1.78 m)
- Listed weight: 203 lb (92 kg)

Career information
- High school: St. Patrick-St. Vincent (Vallejo, California)
- College: Fresno State
- NFL draft: 1994: 6th round, 185th overall pick

Career history
- Kansas City Chiefs (1994)*; Pittsburgh Steelers (1994); Cincinnati Bengals (1996)*
- * Offseason or practice squad member only
- Stats at Pro Football Reference

Anthony John Daigle (born April 5, 1970) is an American former professional football player who was a running back for one season with the Pittsburgh Steelers of the National Football League (NFL). He played college football at Arizona State, El Camino Junior College, and Fresno State. He was selected by the Kansas City Chiefs in the sixth round of the 1994 NFL draft.

== Early life ==
Anthony John Daigle was born on April 5, 1970, in San Francisco, California. He played high school football at St. Patrick-St. Vincent High School in Vallejo, California as a running back. He scored 21 touchdowns his senior year, earning Cal-Hi Sports Small School Player of the Year honors. He also played basketball and baseball in high school. Daigle was inducted into the Vallejo Sports Hall of Fame in 2008.

== College career ==
Daigle began his college career as a member of the Arizona State Sun Devils in 1989 and redshirted that season. He played at El Camino Junior College in 1990, rushing for 1,276 yards and garnering junior college honorable mention All-American honors. Daigle was then a three-year letterman for the Fresno State Bulldogs from 1991 to 1993. He rushed 102 times for 509 yards and ten touchdowns in 1991 while also catching 11 passes for 127 yards and one touchdown. He totaled 111 carries for 680 yards and a WAC-leading 16 touchdowns in 1992. In 1993, he recorded 151 rushing attempts for 755 yards and six touchdowns, and 37 receptions for 543 yards and eight touchdowns. Daigle later graduated from Fresno State with a bachelor's degree in business.

== Professional career ==
Daigle was selected by the Kansas City Chiefs in the sixth round, with the 185th overall pick, of the 1994 NFL draft. He signed with the team on July 20. He was waived on August 23 and signed to the team's practice squad on August 31. Daigle was released by the Chiefs on October 19, 1984.

Daigle was signed to the practice squad of the Pittsburgh Steelers on October 27, 1994. He was promoted to the active roster on November 24 and played in one game for the Steelers during the 1994 season. He was waived on August 27, 1995.

Daigle signed with the Cincinnati Bengals on February 16, 1996. He was waived on August 25, 1996.

== Personal life ==
Daigle later worked as a personal finance counselor.
