= Dean Philpott =

American football player (born 1935)

No. 37
- Position: Fullback

Personal information
- Born: November 11, 1935 (age 90); Mena, Arkansas, U.S.
- Listed height: 6 ft 0 in (1.83 m)
- Listed weight: 200 lb (91 kg)

Career information
- High school: Anaheim (Anaheim, California)
- College: Fresno State
- NFL draft: 1958: 11th round, 122nd overall pick

Career history
- Chicago Cardinals (1958); Oakland Raiders (1960)*
- * Offseason or practice squad member only

Career NFL statistics
- Rushing yards: 44
- Rushing average: 3.7
- Receptions: 4
- Receiving yards: 30
- Stats at Pro Football Reference

Dean Earnest Philpott (born November 11, 1935), nicknamed "the Anaheim Assassin", is an American former professional football player who was a fullback for one season with the Chicago Cardinals of the National Football League (NFL). He was selected by the Cardinals in the 11th round of the 1958 NFL draft after playing college football for the Fresno State Bulldogs.

== Early life ==
Philpott started at Anaheim High School in Anaheim, California, participating in junior varsity football, basketball and diving. He then participated in varsity football, basketball and ran track from 1952 to 1953. He played varsity football, basketball and baseball his senior year in 1954. He earned All Sunset League First-team honors as a halfback in football his junior year and as a fullback in his senior year. Philpottwas also named an All CIF First-team fullback his senior year while being voted Most Inspirational and Most Valuable Player in his junior varsity and varsity years.

== College career ==
Philpott was a two-way starter at Fresno State College (now California State University, Fresno) for the Bulldogs from 1954 to 1957 and was known as the Anaheim Assassin. He set school records for rushing yards with 2,579 and points scored during his college career. He rushed for 767 yards, scored 14 touchdowns and kicked 10 extra points his senior year. Philpott earned First-team All Conference honors for three consecutive years. He was also named to the California Collegiate Athletic Association First-team twice and to All Coast First-team for four consecutive years. He was inducted into the Fresno State University Athletic Hall of Fame in 1993.

== Professional career ==
Philpott was selected by the Chicago Cardinals of the NFL in the 11th round with the 122nd overall pick in the 1958 NFL draft and played in nine games for the team during the 1958 season. He took the 1959 season off while serving in the United States Army as an active duty reservist. He suffered a career ending injury while playing for the AFL's Oakland Raiders during a pre-season game in 1960.

== Personal life ==
Philpott was later a high school teacher.
