= Chris Carter (linebacker) =

American football player (born 1989)

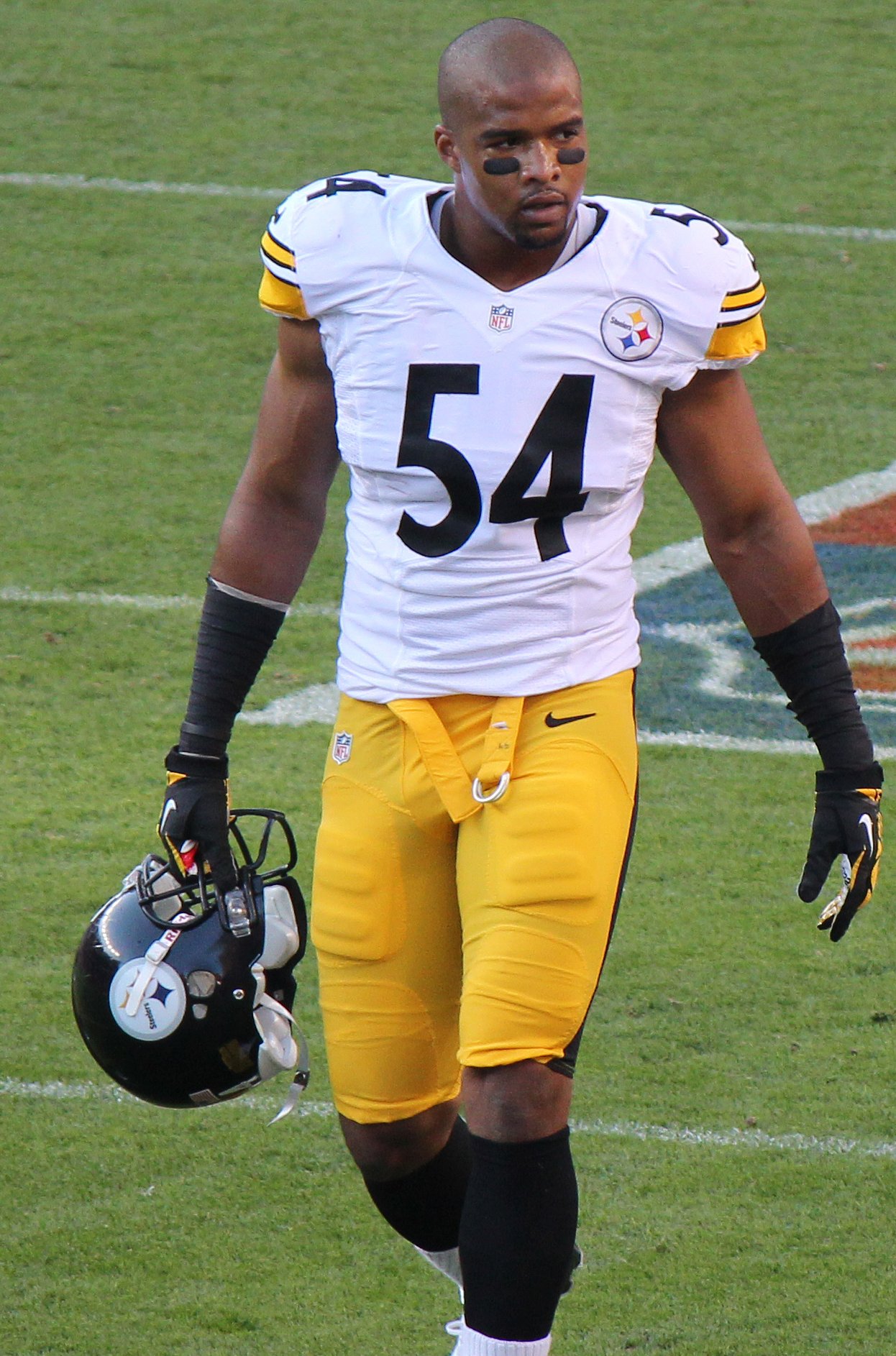
- Carter with the Pittsburgh Steelers in 2012

UCLA Bruins
- Title: Assistant general manager

Personal information
- Born: April 6, 1989 (age 37); Los Angeles, California, U.S.
- Listed height: 6 ft 1 in (1.85 m)
- Listed weight: 240 lb (109 kg)

Career information
- Position: Linebacker (No. 54, 53, 56, 51, 43, 55)
- High school: Henry J. Kaiser (Fontana, California)
- College: Fresno State (2007–2010)
- NFL draft: 2011: 5th round, 162nd overall pick

Career history

Playing
- Pittsburgh Steelers (2011–2013); Indianapolis Colts (2014); Cincinnati Bengals (2014–2015); Baltimore Ravens (2015–2016); Indianapolis Colts (2016); Washington Redskins (2017)

Operations
- USC (2022–2023) Director of player development; UCLA (2024–present) Assistant general manager

Awards and highlights
- WAC Defensive Player of the Year (2010)

Career NFL statistics
- Total tackles: 44
- Fumble recoveries: 2
- Stats at Pro Football Reference

Christopher Darnell Carter (born April 6, 1989) is an American former professional football player who was a linebacker for seven seasons in the National Football League (NFL). He was selected by the Pittsburgh Steelers in the fifth round of the 2011 NFL draft and played college football for the Fresno State Bulldogs.

== Early life ==
Carter played high school football at Henry Kaiser High School in Fontana, California, where he was teammates with former Tampa Bay Buccaneers wide receiver Shawn Moore. During his high school years, his honors included: All-State Third-team; Academic All-State; induction into the San Bernardino Hall of Fame; League Defensive Most Valuable Player; and named to the All-California Interscholastic Federation all-county and all-area team.

== College career ==
Carter played college football for the Fresno State Bulldogs earning First-team All-Conference player honors three times and Defensive MVP of the Western Athletic Conference honors and, importantly, a BA Communications degree.

== Professional career ==
Pre-draft measurables
Height	Weight	Arm length	Hand span	Wingspan	40-yard dash	10-yard split	20-yard split	20-yard shuttle	Three-cone drill	Vertical jump	Broad jump	Bench press
6 ft 1 1/8 in (1.86 m)	248 lb (112 kg)	33 in (0.84 m)	9 3/8 in (0.24 m)	6 ft 7 3/8 in (2.02 m)	4.67 s	1.64 s	2.71 s	4.34 s	6.88 s	36.0 in (0.91 m)	9 ft 6 in (2.90 m)	27 reps
All values from NFL Combine

=== Pittsburgh Steelers ===
Carter was selected by the Pittsburgh Steelers in the fifth round of the 2011 NFL draft with the 162nd overall pick. He was released on August 30, 2014.

=== Indianapolis Colts (first stint) ===
Carter signed with the Indianapolis Colts on September 9, 2014. Carter was waived by the Colts on October 8, 2014.

=== Cincinnati Bengals ===
Carter signed with the Cincinnati Bengals on December 3, 2014. The Bengals released Carter on December 15, 2015.

=== Baltimore Ravens ===
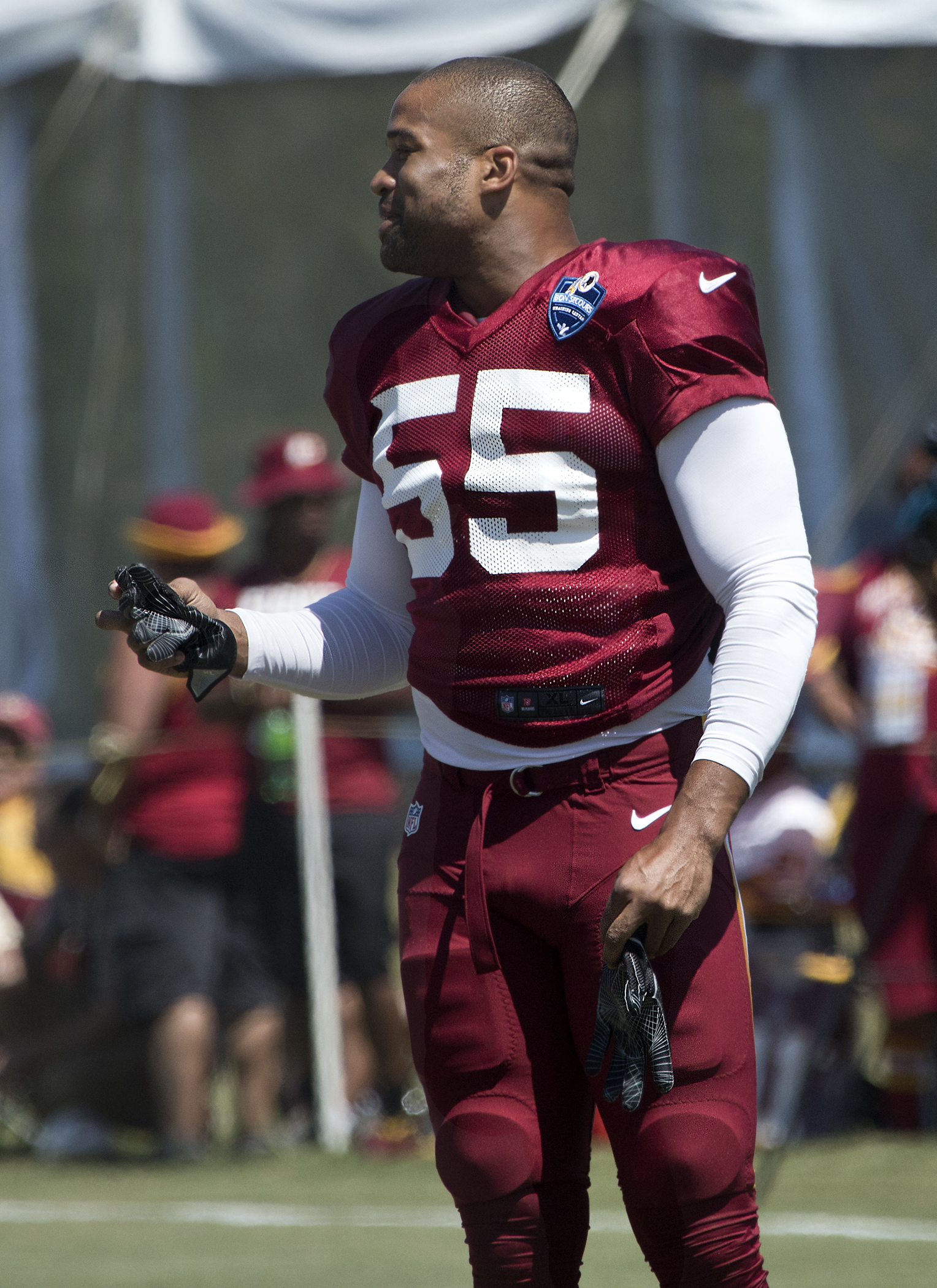
Carter with the Washington Redskins in 2017

On December 21, 2015, Carter was signed by the Baltimore Ravens. He was re-signed by the Ravens on March 15, 2016. He was released on October 12, 2016. Carter later served as NFLPA Board of Player Representative from 2016-2017.

=== Indianapolis Colts (second stint) ===
On October 13, 2016, Carter was signed by the Indianapolis Colts, and served as team captain from 2016-2017.

=== Washington Redskins ===
On March 16, 2017, Carter signed with the Washington Redskins. He was carted off the field in the fourth quarter of the Week 14 game against the Los Angeles Chargers. The following day, the team announced Carter suffered a fractured fibula. He was placed on injured reserve on December 12, 2017. Carter now serves as NFLPA Board of Player Representative.

== Personal life ==
After his playing career, Carter became a business strategist, youth foundation director, and motivational speaker.

Carter is the founder of two foundations: Chris Carter 4 Youth Foundation, which supports children in low-income communities by raising funds to donate food, books and school supplies and The Carter After School Program, a Latino Bilingual Learning Program at Kaiser High School in Fontana, CA, helps struggling students improve academic performance and prepare them for college. Most recently, Chris was honored by Senator Torres of the 32nd District for philanthropic services to the Fontana Unified School District.
