= Derron Smith =

American football player (born 1992)

No. 40, 31, 36
- Position: Safety

Personal information
- Born: February 4, 1992 (age 34); Banning, California, U.S.
- Listed height: 5 ft 10 in (1.78 m)
- Listed weight: 195 lb (88 kg)

Career information
- High school: Banning
- College: Fresno State
- NFL draft: 2015: 6th round, 197th overall pick

Career history
- Cincinnati Bengals (2015–2017); Cleveland Browns (2017); San Antonio Commanders (2019); Minnesota Vikings (2019)*; Dallas Renegades (2020)
- * Offseason or practice squad member only

Awards and highlights
- 3× First-team All-Mountain West (2012, 2013, 2014)

Career NFL statistics
- Total tackles: 17
- Pass deflections: 1
- Stats at Pro Football Reference

Derron Smith (born February 4, 1992) is an American former professional football player who was a safety in the National Football League (NFL). He played college football for the Fresno State Bulldogs.

== Early life ==
Smith attended Banning High School in Banning, California, where he was a three-sport star in football, basketball and track. He played as a safety, quarterback and punter for the Banning Broncos high school football team. As a senior, he had 109 tackles and six interceptions on defense, while also rushing for 1,579 yards with 13 touchdowns on offense. He was a standout on his basketball team, averaging more than 17 points per game.

Also an outstanding track & field athlete, Smith was one of the state's top long jumpers. At the 2010 CIF-SS Division 3 Meet, he posted the top-qualifying mark in the long jump at 7.13 meters (23 ft, 2 in), but he had his result stripped by the head official. Smith's marks would have likely won the meet since the winner of the event posted marks lower than both of Smith's efforts.

Smith was regarded as a three-star recruit by both Rivals.com and Scout.com. He was ranked as the No. 83 overall player and the No. 35 in his position in the state of California. He chose Fresno State over scholarship offers from Nebraska, San Diego State, and UNLV, among others.

== College career ==
As a true freshman at Fresno State University in 2010, Smith played on special teams and as a backup safety. He finished the year with 28 tackles. As a sophomore in 2011, Smith played in only three games due to a broken arm and received a medical hardship waiver from the NCAA. He finished the season with 16 tackles and an interception. As a redshirt sophomore in 2012, Smith was a first-team All-Mountain West Conference selection after recording 79 tackles and six interceptions. As a junior in 2013, he was again a first-team All-Mountain West selection after recording 87 tackles, eight interceptions and four sacks. Smith returned his senior season in 2014. He entered the season as the active Football Bowl Subdivision (FBS) leader in interceptions with 14.

== Professional career ==
Pre-draft measurables
Height	Weight	Arm length	Hand span	40-yard dash	10-yard split	20-yard split	20-yard shuttle	Three-cone drill	Vertical jump	Broad jump	Bench press
5 ft 10 in (1.78 m)	200 lb (91 kg)	29 3/4 in (0.76 m)	9 in (0.23 m)	4.61 s	1.58 s	2.61 s	4.44 s	6.95 s	34 in (0.86 m)	10 ft 3 in (3.12 m)	18 reps
All values from NFL Combine/Pro Day

=== Cincinnati Bengals ===
Smith was selected 197th overall by the Cincinnati Bengals in the sixth round of the 2015 NFL draft.

On November 4, 2017, Smith was released by the Bengals and was re-signed to the practice squad.

=== Cleveland Browns ===
On November 9, 2017, Smith was signed by the Cleveland Browns off the Bengals practice squad. He was waived on August 31, 2018.

=== San Antonio Commanders ===
In December 2018, Smith signed with the San Antonio Commanders of the Alliance of American Football (AAF).

=== Minnesota Vikings ===
On April 5, 2019, Smith signed with the Minnesota Vikings. He was released during final roster cuts on August 31, 2019.

=== Dallas Renegades ===
In October 2019, Smith was selected by the Dallas Renegades of the XFL in the 2020 XFL draft. He had his contract terminated when the league suspended operations on April 10, 2020.
