= Dwayne Wright =

American gridiron football player (born 1983)

No. 31
- Position: Running back

Personal information
- Born: June 2, 1983 (age 43); San Diego, California, U.S.
- Listed height: 5 ft 11 in (1.80 m)
- Listed weight: 228 lb (103 kg)

Career information
- High school: Lincoln (San Diego)
- College: West Hills College (2001–2002); Fresno State (2003–2006)
- NFL draft: 2007: 4th round, 111th overall pick

Career history
- Buffalo Bills (2007); New York Giants (2009)*; Philadelphia Eagles (2010)*; Pittsburgh Steelers (2010)*; Hartford Colonials (2012); Toronto Argonauts (2012)
- * Offseason or practice squad member only

Awards and highlights
- All-Central Valley Conference (2002); Second-team All-WAC (2006); Central Valley Espy-Male Athlete of year (2007); Central Valley Espy- College Male Athlete Of Year (2007)

Career NFL statistics
- Rushing attempts: 29
- Rushing yards: 94
- Receptions: 3
- Receiving yards: 17
- Stats at Pro Football Reference

Dwayne Wright (born June 2, 1983) is an American former professional football player who was a running back in the National Football League (NFL). He was selected by the Buffalo Bills in the fourth round of the 2007 NFL draft. He played college football for West Hills College and the Fresno State Bulldogs.

Wright was also a member of the New York Giants, Philadelphia Eagles, Pittsburgh Steelers, Hartford Colonials and Toronto Argonauts.

== Early life ==
Wright prepped at Morse High School during his 9th and 10th grade years. He then transferred to Lincoln High School in San Diego, California.

== College career ==
Wright played college football at West Hills College in Coalinga, California. In 2003, he transferred to Fresno State. He declared for the 2007 NFL draft after choosing to forgo his junior season.

== Professional career ==
=== Pre-draft ===
Wright was invited to the 2007 NFL Scouting Combine. He visited with the Atlanta Falcons, Buffalo Bills, Pittsburgh Steelers and Philadelphia Eagles before the draft.

Pre-draft measurables
Height	Weight	Arm length	Hand span	40-yard dash	10-yard split	20-yard split	20-yard shuttle	Three-cone drill	Vertical jump	Broad jump	Bench press
5 ft 11 1/2 in (1.82 m)	228 lb (103 kg)	31 1/4 in (0.79 m)	9 1/2 in (0.24 m)	4.73 s	1.68 s	2.75 s	4.43 s	7.23 s	34 in (0.86 m)	9 ft 7 in (2.92 m)	14 reps
All values from 2007 NFL Combine

=== Buffalo Bills ===
Wright was drafted 111th overall by the Buffalo Bills in the fourth round of the 2007 NFL draft. He was signed to a contract on July 25. He was waived on August 30, 2008.

=== New York Giants ===
Wright was signed by the New York Giants on January 14, 2009. He was waived on September 5.

=== Philadelphia Eagles ===
After working out for the Philadelphia Eagles on January 13, 2010, Wright was signed to a two-year contract by the Eagles on January 29. He was going to be converted to fullback after playing running back during his entire career. He was waived on August 1.

=== Pittsburgh Steelers ===
Wright was claimed off waivers from the Philadelphia Eagles by the Pittsburgh Steelers on August 2, 2010. He was waived on August 31.

=== Hartford Colonials ===
Wright was signed by the Hartford Colonials of the United Football League on September 9, 2012. He played one game and then was released due to contract issues.

=== Toronto Argonauts ===
On October 5, 2012, Wright signed a practice roster agreement with the Toronto Argonauts of the Canadian Football League. He was released by the Argonauts on June 24, 2013.
