= Charlie Jones (American football, born 1972) =

American football player (born 1972)

No. 17, 82
- Position: Wide receiver

Personal information
- Born: December 1, 1972 (age 53); Hanford, California, U.S.
- Listed height: 5 ft 8 in (1.73 m)
- Listed weight: 175 lb (79 kg)

Career information
- High school: Lemoore High School
- College: Fresno State
- NFL draft: 1996: 4th round, 114th overall pick

Career history
- San Diego Chargers (1996–1999); New Orleans Saints (2000)

Career NFL statistics
- Receptions: 129
- Receiving yards: 1,736
- Receiving touchdowns: 9
- Stats at Pro Football Reference

Charlie Edward Jones (born December 1, 1972) is an American former professional football player who was selected by the San Diego Chargers in the fourth round of the 1996 NFL draft. A 5'8" wide receiver from Fresno State University, Jones played in 4 NFL seasons for the Chargers from 1996 to 1999. He attended Lemoore High School.

Pre-draft measurables
Height	Weight	Arm length	Hand span	40-yard dash	10-yard split	20-yard split	20-yard shuttle	Vertical jump
5 ft 8 in (1.73 m)	175 lb (79 kg)	31 5/8 in (0.80 m)	9 5/8 in (0.24 m)	4.59 s	1.59 s	2.68 s	4.59 s	34.0 in (0.86 m)
