= Brad Hopkins =

American football player (born 1970)

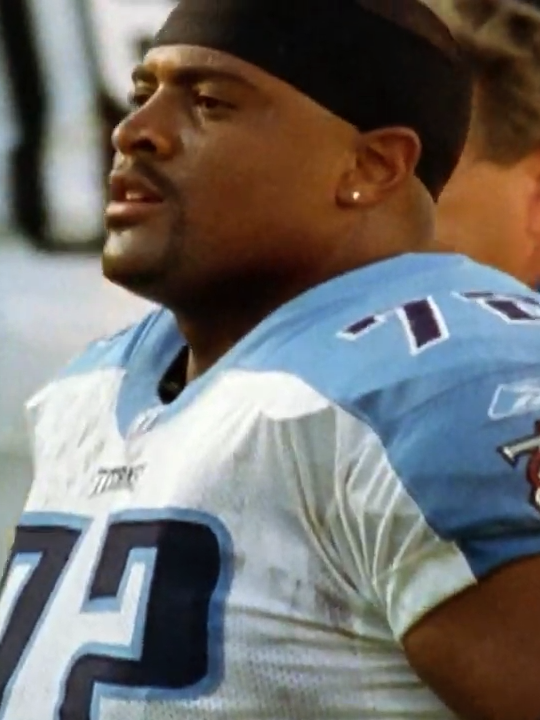
- Hopkins with the Tennessee Titans

No. 72
- Position: Offensive tackle

Personal information
- Born: September 5, 1970 (age 56); Columbia, South Carolina, U.S.
- Listed height: 6 ft 5 in (1.96 m)
- Listed weight: 305 lb (138 kg)

Career information
- High school: Moline (Moline, Illinois)
- College: Illinois (1989–1992)
- NFL draft: 1993: 1st round, 13th overall pick

Career history
- Houston Oilers / Tennessee Oilers / Tennessee Titans (1993–2005)

Awards and highlights
- All-Pro (2000); 2× Pro Bowl (2000, 2003); PFWA All-Rookie Team (1993)

Career NFL statistics
- Games played: 194
- Games started: 188
- Fumble recoveries: 7
- Stats at Pro Football Reference

Bradley D. Hopkins (born September 5, 1970) is an American former professional football player who was a left tackle for 13 seasons in the National Football League (NFL), all of them with the Houston Oilers / Tennessee Titans organization. He played college football for the Illinois Fighting Illini.

== Early life ==
Hopkins was an outstanding two-sport athlete at Moline High School, lettering in football as well as basketball. In football, Hopkins played on both offense and defense, playing on the defensive line as well as at tight end. In basketball, Hopkins played power forward, and was in the same lineup as future Iowa shot-blocker and NBA first-round draft pick Acie Earl.

== College career ==
Hopkins received a scholarship to play football for the Illinois Fighting Illini and was recruited by John Mackovic. As a freshman, Hopkins was a reserve offensive lineman, blocking for future NFL overall first pick Jeff George. George guided the Illini to the 1990 Florida Citrus Bowl against the Virginia Cavaliers after a 9–2 record, second only to the Michigan Wolverines in the Big Ten Conference.

His sophomore year, Hopkins became a starter, and started ten games at left tackle for quarterback Jason Verduzco. The Illini posted an 8–4 record, tied for first in the Big Ten and went to the Hall of Fame Bowl, losing to the Clemson Tigers. The following season, in 1991, Hopkins started all 12 games once again protecting Verduzco, and received All-Big Ten honors. The team posted a 6–6 record, good for fifth place in the Big Ten, and a trip to the 1991 John Hancock Bowl.

His senior year, Hopkins was selected team captain by first-year coach Lou Tepper, along with John Wright and Steven Mueller. He started all 12 games at left tackle and was named All-American as well as All-Big Ten. The Illini played in the 1992 Holiday Bowl, finishing with a 6–5–1 season.

Hopkins graduated from University of Illinois with a degree in Speech Communications.

== Professional career ==
Pre-draft measurables
Height	Weight	Arm length	Hand span	40-yard dash	10-yard split	20-yard split	20-yard shuttle	Vertical jump	Broad jump	Bench press
6 ft 3 3/8 in (1.91 m)	306 lb (139 kg)	33 5/8 in (0.85 m)	9 1/2 in (0.24 m)	5.19 s	1.82 s	3.03 s	4.63 s	27.0 in (0.69 m)	8 ft 10 in (2.69 m)	18 reps

Hopkins was selected in the first round of the 1993 NFL draft with the 13th overall pick by the Houston Oilers. In his rookie season, Hopkins started eleven games at left tackle and was named first-team All-Rookie by several organizations.

Hopkins started all sixteen games for the Oilers for the 1995, 1996, 1997, and 1999 seasons, blocking for fellow Big Ten alumnus Eddie George. In 1999, the Titans made it to Super Bowl XXXIV in which Hopkins started, however they lost to the Kurt Warner-led St. Louis Rams.

In 2000, Hopkins earned a trip to the Pro Bowl, starting in all but one game for the Tennessee Titans. Hopkins was part of an offensive line that allowed the third-lowest number of sacks in the NFL, and George gained over 1,500 yards rushing. That season, the Titans finished with a 13–3 record, winning the AFC Central Division, but lost to the Baltimore Ravens in the first round of the playoffs.

Hopkins continued starting for the Titans, and earned another trip to the Pro Bowl in 2003, starting all sixteen games for the fifth time in his career. The Titans were propelled by a high-powered offense with Steve McNair and Eddie George, which scored 30 points in six consecutive games – a franchise record.

He announced his retirement from football on June 14, 2006. Along with Steve McNair, he was the last player left from the Houston Oilers.

He currently works as an analyst for SiruisXM's ESPNU, B1G, ACC, SEC, Mad Dog Radio and NFL Radio.

He is the father of Los Angeles Rams tight end Brycen Hopkins. Hopkins and his son co-founded LuxNashRide, a Nashville-based transportation concierge company. Hopkins also has a son named Collin who played baseball as a catcher for the Indiana Hoosiers.
