= 1991 Big Ten Conference football season =

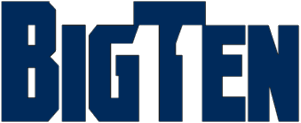
- League: NCAA Division I-A
- Sport: football
- Teams: 10
- Champions: Michigan

Football seasons

1991 Big Ten Conference football standings
	Conf.					Overall
Team	W		L		T	W		L		T
No. 6 Michigan $	8	–	0	–	0	10	–	2	–	0
No. 10 Iowa	7	–	1	–	0	10	–	1	–	1
Ohio State	5	–	3	–	0	8	–	4	–	0
Indiana	5	–	3	–	0	7	–	4	–	1
Illinois	4	–	4	–	0	6	–	6	–	0
Purdue	3	–	5	–	0	4	–	7	–	0
Michigan State	3	–	5	–	0	3	–	8	–	0
Wisconsin	2	–	6	–	0	5	–	6	–	0
Northwestern	2	–	6	–	0	3	–	8	–	0
Minnesota	1	–	7	–	0	2	–	9	–	0
$ – Conference champion; Rankings from AP Poll

The 1991 Big Ten Conference football season was the 96th season of college football played by the member schools of the Big Ten Conference and was a part of the 1991 NCAA Division I-A football season.

== Regular season ==
At 8-0 (10-2 overall), No. 6 Michigan repeated as the 1991 Big Ten champions for a fourth straight year (after a four-way tie for first the previous season). No. 10 Iowa came in second with a 7-1 conference record (10-1-1 overall), losing only to Michigan.

Ohio State and Indiana tied for third place with 5-3 conference marks. Illinois was fifth at 4-4 (6-6 overall).

Purdue and Michigan state tied for sixth place at 3-5 in Big Ten play. Wisconsin and Northwestern tied for eighth place with 2-6 league records.

Minnesota finished last at 1-7 (2-9 overall).

== Bowl games ==
Five Big Ten teams played in bowl games, with the conference going 1-3-1 overall:

- Rose Bowl: No. 2 Washington 34, No. 4 Michigan 14
- Hall of Fame Bowl: No. 16 Syracuse 24, No. 25 Ohio State 17
- John Hancock Bowl: No. 22 UCLA 6, Illinois 3
- Copper Bowl: Indiana 24, Baylor 0
- Holiday Bowl: BYU 13, No. 7 Iowa 13
