= Illinois Fighting Illini football =

Football team of the University of Illinois in the US

2026 Illinois Fighting Illini football team
- First season: 1890; 136 years ago
- Athletic director: Josh Whitman
- General manager: Patrick Embleton
- Head coach: Bret Bielema; 6th season, 38–26 (.594)
- Location: Champaign, Illinois
- Stadium: Gies Memorial Stadium (capacity: 60,670, record: 78,297)
- NCAA division: Division I FBS
- Conference: Big Ten
- Colors: Orange and blue
- All-time record: 651–627–50 (.509)
- Bowl record: 10–12 (.455)

National championships
- Claimed: 1914, 1919, 1923, 1927, 1951

Conference championships
- Big Ten: 1910, 1914, 1915, 1918, 1919, 1923, 1927, 1928, 1946, 1951, 1953, 1963, 1983, 1990, 2001
- Consensus All-Americans: 27
- Rivalries: Northwestern (rivalry); Purdue (rivalry); Ohio State (rivalry); Missouri (rivalry); Indiana (rivalry); Iowa (rivalry); Michigan (rivalry)

Uniforms
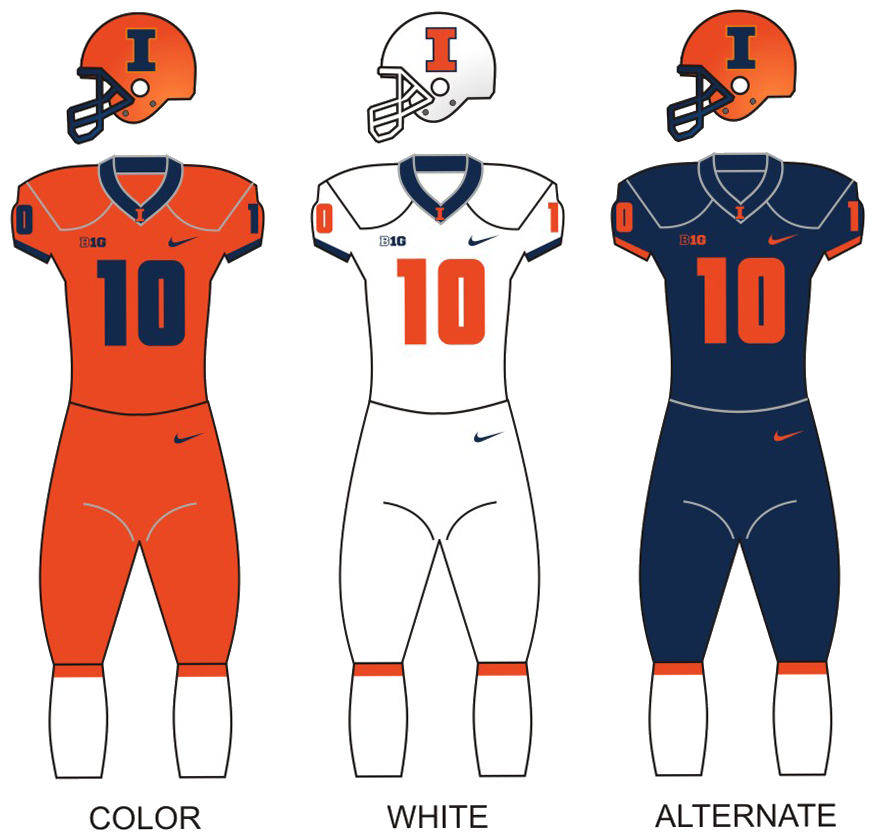
- Fight song: Illinois Loyalty and Oskee Wow Wow
- Marching band: Marching Illini
- Outfitter: Nike
- Website: fightingillini.com

The Illinois Fighting Illini football program represents the University of Illinois Urbana-Champaign in college football at the NCAA Division I Football Bowl Subdivision (FBS). Illinois competes within the Big Ten Conference, of which it is a founding member, and has played home games at Gies Memorial Stadium in Champaign, Illinois since 1923. The Fighting Illini are led by head coach Bret Bielema.

Among FBS programs, Illinois claims fifteen Big Ten championships, ranking fourth-most in history, and five national championships, ranking thirteenth-most in history. Illinois has had twenty-seven Consensus All-Americans, and fifteen former Illini have been inducted into the College Football Hall of Fame; in the Pro Football Hall of Fame, six former Illini have been inducted. Illinois has three trophy rivalries with Northwestern, Purdue, and Ohio State.

== History ==
=== Early history (1890–1912) ===
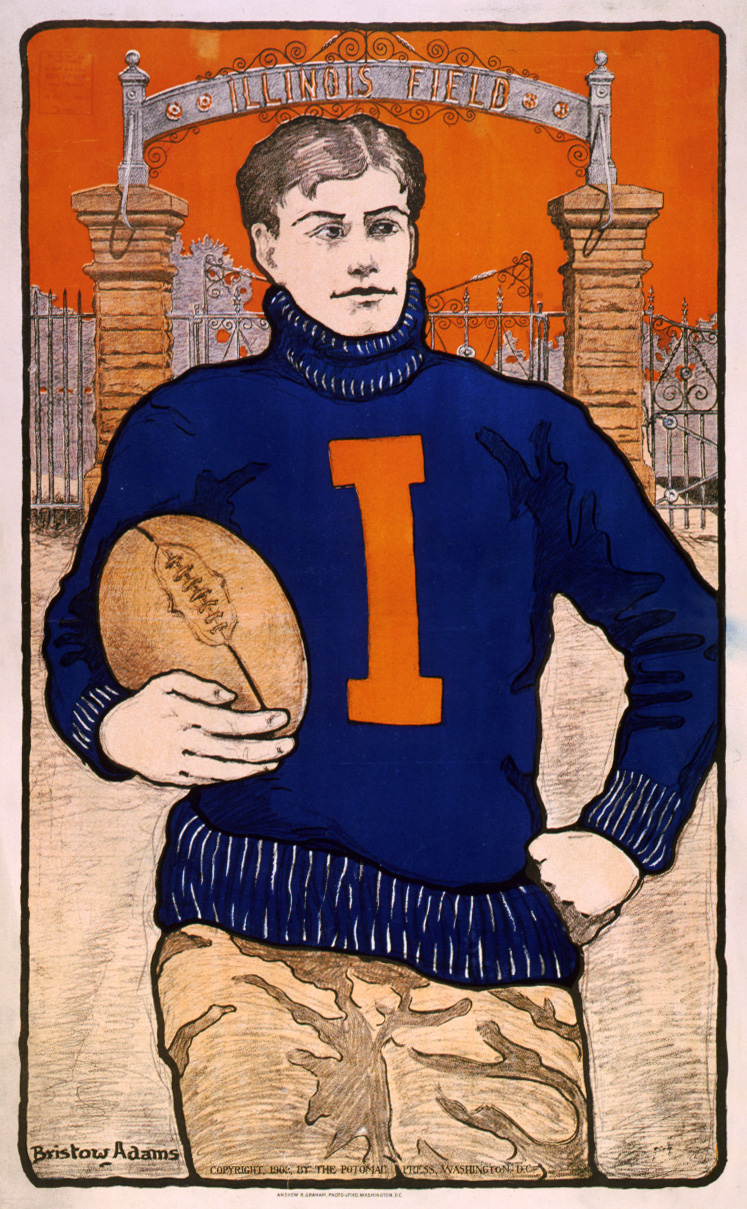
A Bristow Adams poster of an Illini football player, c. 1902

The University of Illinois fielded its first football team in 1890, under the direction of Scott Williams, the team's starting quarterback who also served as the team's head coach. The team finished with a record of 1–2. Robert Lackey took over the reins for the program's second season in 1891, and the team finished undefeated with a mark of 6–0. In July 1892, several days after graduating from Dartmouth, Edward K. Hall was hired by the University of Illinois Urbana-Champaign to serve as head football coach and director of physical training at a salary of $1,000. He announced at the time that he would spend the summer working as a waiter at a hotel in Old Orchard Beach, Maine, before reporting to Illinois. He was the third head football coach at Illinois, held that position for the 1892 and 1893 seasons, and led the team to a record of 12–6–4 in his two years as head coach. His 1892 team compiled a 9–4–1 record, played the first games in the football rivalries with Northwestern and Chicago, and played six road games in nine days (four wins and two losses) in late October 1892.

George Huff was the fifth head coach in Illini football history, succeeding Louis Vail. Huff led the Illini into the Big Ten Conference, which formed in 1896. After back-to-back 4–2–1 seasons in 1895 and 1896, the Illini posted a 6–2 record in 1897. That proved to be the high point of Huff's tenure, as Illinois slipped to 4–5 in 1898 and 3–5–1 in 1899, ending Huff's tenure at Illinois. Arthur Hall served as Illinois' head football coach from 1907 to 1912, compiling a 36–12–4 record. Hall led the Illini to an undefeated 7–0 mark in 1910.

=== Robert Zuppke era (1913–1941) ===
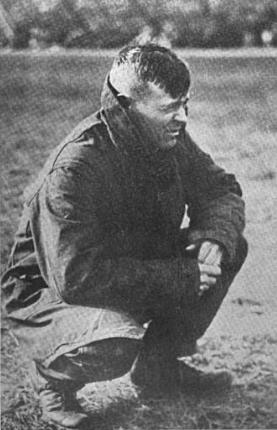
Coach Robert Zuppke in 1920

For 29 seasons, Robert Zuppke served as Illinois' head football coach. During his tenure, Illinois' fan attendance at home games skyrocketed from an average of 4,500 to 60,000. Under Zuppke's leadership, the Fighting Illini posted undefeated seasons in 1914, 1915, 1923 and 1927. In 1914, the Fighting Illini compiled a 7–0 record (6–0 against Western Conference opponents), claimed a national championship, and outscored their opponents by a combined total of 224–22. The team was retroactively selected as the national champion for 1914 by the Billingsley Report and as a co-national champion with Army by Parke H. Davis. End Perry Graves and guard Ralph Chapman were consensus All-Americans. Chapman was the team captain. In 1915, the Illini compiled a 5–0–2 record and finished as co-champions of the Western Conference. Center John W. Watson was the team captain. In 1923, the Fighting Illini compiled an 8–0 record (5–0 against Big Ten Conference opponents) and outscored their opponents by a combined total of 136–20. The team was selected retroactively as the national champion by the Boand System, College Football Researchers Association, Helms Athletic Foundation, and Parke H. Davis, and as a co-national champion by the Berryman QPRS system, National Championship Foundation, and Jeff Sagarin (using the ELO-Chess methodology). Guard Jim McMillen and halfback Red Grange were consensus All-Americans. McMillen was also the team captain.

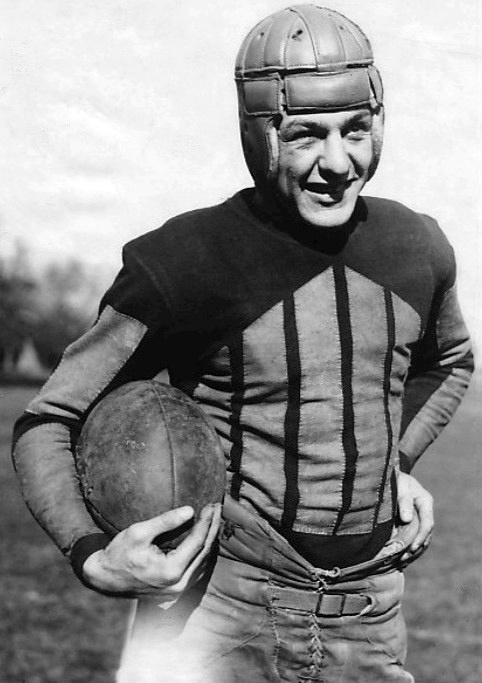
HB Red Grange "The Galloping Ghost" in 1923

In 1927, the Fighting Illini compiled a 7–0–1 record (5–0 against Western Conference opponents) and outscored their opponents by a combined total of 152–24. The team was selected as the 1927 national champion by the Billingsley Report, Dickinson System, Helms Athletic Foundation, National Championship Foundation, and Parke H. Davis. Though the team had no consensus All-Americans and was known for its lack of prominent names, center Robert Reitsch and guard Russ Crane made a handful of first-team selections. Reitsch was also the team captain. Illinois struggled from 1930 to 1941, posting seven losing seasons and no conference championships. The Illini did finish 7–1 in 1934, however, this proved to be the last season of six or more wins during the Zuppke era. Zuppke retired from Illinois following a 2–6 campaign in 1941, leaving the Illini after compiling a 131–81–12 record.

=== Ray Eliot era (1942–1959) ===
Illinois promoted assistant coach Ray Eliot to the position of head coach after Zuppke's retirement. Eliot would lead the Illini football program for 18 seasons, compiling an 83–73–11 record. In 1946, the Illini won the Big Ten Conference title and completed an 8–2 season with a 45–14 win over UCLA in the Rose Bowl. The team's captain was center Mac Wenskunas. Guard Alex Agase was voted the team's most valuable player and received the Chicago Tribune Silver Football as the Big Ten's most valuable player.

In 1951, the Illini compiled a 9–0–1 record, finished in first place in the Big Ten Conference, was ranked No. 4 in the final AP Poll, and defeated Stanford 40–7 in the 1952 Rose Bowl. The lone setback was a scoreless tie with Ohio State. The team is the school's last national champion in football with a 40–7 rout of Stanford in what was the first nationally televised college football game. Additionally, Al Brosky had 8 interceptions that season bringing his career total to 30, an NCAA record that still stands today. His record included a DiMaggio-like streak of 16 consecutive games with an interception. He was inducted into the College Football Hall of Fame in 1998. Halfback Johnny Karras was a consensus first-team pick on the 1951 College Football All-America Team. Linebacker Chuck Boerio was selected as the team's most valuable player. In 1953, the Illini compiled a 7–1–1 record, finished in a tie for first place in the Big Ten Conference, and were ranked No. 7 in the final AP Poll. The sole defeat was a 34–7 loss to Wisconsin. Tackle Don Ernst was selected as the team's most valuable player. Sophomore halfback J. C. Caroline led the team with 1,256 rushing yards on 194 attempts (6.5 yards per carry) and was selected as a consensus first-team player on the 1953 College Football All-America Team. Guard John Bauer was selected by the Newspaper Enterprise Association as a third-team All-American. Following a 5–3–1 record in 1959, Eliot opted to retire as Illinois' head football coach.

=== Pete Elliott era (1960–1966) ===
Illinois hired California head coach Pete Elliott as Eliot's replacement in 1960. With the Illini, his record was 31–34–1, earning a Big Ten title and Rose Bowl victory over Washington during the 1963 season. A few months after the end of the 1966 season in which the Illini finished 4–6, Elliott was forced to resign as head coach in the wake of a slush fund scandal in the athletic program.

=== Jim Valek era (1967–1970) ===
South Carolina assistant coach Jim Valek was hired as Elliott's replacement in 1967. Under Valek, the Illini compiled an 8–32 record, the worst of any Illini football head coach in decades. In 1967, the Illini compiled a 4–6 record and finished in a tie for fifth place in the Big Ten Conference. The team's offensive leaders were quarterback Dean Volkman with 1,005 passing yards, running back Rich Johnson with 768 rushing yards, and wide receiver John Wright with 698 receiving yards. End John K. Wright was selected as the team's most valuable player.

In 1968, the Illini compiled a 1–9 record and finished in a tie for eighth place in the Big Ten Conference. The team's offensive leaders were quarterback Bob Naponic with 813 passing yards, running back Rich Johnson with 973 rushing yards, and wide receiver Doug Dieken with 223 receiving yards. Fullback Rich Johnson was selected as the team's most valuable player. In 1969, the Illini compiled a 0–10 record and finished in last place in the Big Ten Conference. The team's offensive leaders were quarterback Steve Livas with 705 passing yards, running back Dave Jackson with 465 rushing yards, and wide receiver Doug Dieken with 486 receiving yards. Dieken was selected as the team's most valuable player. Guard Doug Redmann was selected by the Newspaper Enterprise Association as a second-team player on the 1969 College Football All-America Team.

In 1970, the Illini compiled a 3–7 record and finished in a tie for last place in the Big Ten Conference. The team's offensive leaders were quarterback Mike Wells with 906 passing yards, running back Darrell Robinson with 749 rushing yards, and wide receiver Doug Dieken with 537 receiving yards. Dieken was selected for the second consecutive year as the team's most valuable player. Illinois fired Valek after the 1970 season, citing the decline in the team's on-field performance.

=== Bob Blackman era (1971–1976) ===
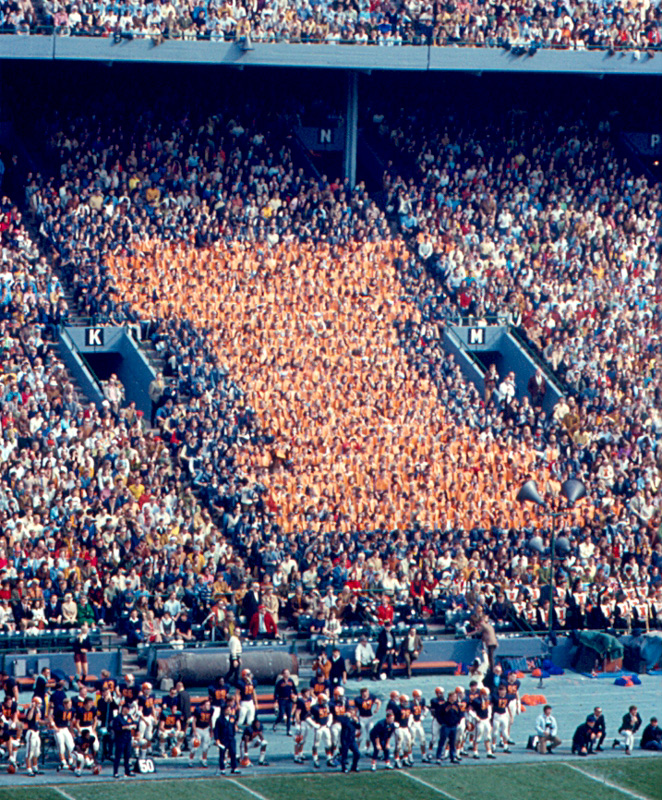
Illinois students seated in a "Block I" during a 1970 game at Memorial Stadium

Coach Bob Blackman came to Illinois from Dartmouth, where he had had a successful head coach tenure spanning more than a decade, to turn the Illini program around in 1971. Under Blackman, the Illini compiled a record of 29–36–1. In 1971, the Illini compiled a 5–6 record and finished in a three-way tie for third place in the Big Ten Conference. The team's offensive leaders were quarterback Mike Wells with 1,007 passing yards, running back John Wilson with 543 rushing yards, and wide receiver Garvin Roberson with 372 receiving yards. Punter/halfback Terry Masar was selected as the team's most valuable player.

In 1972, the Illini compiled a 3–8 record and finished in a tie for 6th in the Big Ten Conference. The team's offensive leaders were quarterback Mike Wells with 837 passing yards, running back George Uremovich with 611 rushing yards, and wide receiver Garvin Roberson with 569 receiving yards. Center Larry McCarren and defensive end Larry Allen were the most valuable players. In 1973, the Illini compiled a 5–6 record and finished in a four-way tie for 4thin the Big Ten Conference. The team's offensive leaders were quarterback Jeff Hollenbach with 916 passing yards, running back George Uremovich with 519 rushing yards, and wide receiver Garvin Roberson with 416 receiving yards. Halfback Eddie Jenkins and defensive end Octavus Morgan were the most valuable players.

In 1974, the Illini compiled a 6–4–1 record and finished 5th in the Big Ten, their first winning season since 1965. The team's offensive leaders were quarterback Jeff Hollenbach with 1,037 passing yards, running back Chubby Phillips with 772 rushing yards, and wide receiver Joe Smalzer with 525 receiving yards. Hollenbach and linebacker Tom Hicks were the most valuable players. In 1975, the Illini compiled a 5–6 record and finished in a three-way tie for 3rd in the Big Ten. The team's offensive leaders were quarterback Kurt Steger with 1,136 passing yards, running back Lonnie Perrin with 907 rushing yards, and wide receiver Frank Johnson with 349 receiving yards. Offensive tackle Stu Levenick and defensive back Bruce Beaman were the most valuable players.

In 1976, the Illini compiled a 5–6 record and finished in a four-way tie for 3rd in the Big Ten. The team's offensive leaders were quarterback Kurt Steger with 1,243 passing yards, running back James Coleman with 687 rushing yards, and wide receiver Eric Rouse with 326 receiving yards. Offensive tackle Jerry Finis and linebacker Scott Studwell were the most valuable players. Blackman was fired following the 1976 season, the administration again unhappy with the team's consistent mediocrity.

=== Gary Moeller era (1977–1979) ===
Michigan defensive coordinator Gary Moeller was hired to replace Blackman in 1977. Under Moeller, the Illini continued to struggle, compiling a 6–24–3 record.

In 1977, the Illini compiled a 3–8 record and finished in ninth place in the Big Ten Conference. The team's offensive leaders were quarterback Mike McCray with 418 passing yards, running back James Coleman with 715 rushing yards, and wide receiver Tom Schooley with 231 receiving yards. Coleman and linebacker John Sullivan were selected as the team's most valuable players. In 1978, the Illini compiled a 1–8–2 record and again finished in ninth place in the Big Ten Conference. The team's offensive leaders were quarterback Rich Weiss with 665 passing yards, running back Wayne Strader with 389 rushing yards, and wide receiver Jeff Barnes with 270 receiving yards. Linebacker John Sullivan and center Randy Taylor were selected as the team's most valuable players.

In 1979, the Illini compiled a 2–8–1 record and, for the third season in a row, finished in ninth place in the Big Ten Conference. The team's offensive leaders were quarterback Lawrence McCullough with 1,254 passing yards, running back Mike Holmes with 792 rushing yards, and wide receiver John Lopez with 296 receiving yards. McCullough was selected as the team's most valuable player. Illinois fired Moeller after the 1979 season.

=== Mike White era (1980–1987) ===
San Francisco 49ers offensive line coach Mike White succeeded Moeller and brought moderate success to Illinois' football program, compiling a 47–41–3 record in his eight years.

The Illini posted five consecutive winning seasons from 1981 to 1985, posting records of 7–4, 7–5, 10–2, 7–4 and 6–5–1. His best team was the 1983 unit, which won a school-record 10 games en route to Illinois' first conference title and bowl appearance in 20 years. The 1983 season ended with a loss to UCLA in the Rose Bowl. White departed as coach after 1987 due to recruiting violations.

=== John Mackovic era (1988–1991) ===
John Mackovic, head coach of the NFL's Kansas City Chiefs, was hired as the Fighting Illini's 20th head football coach in 1988.

In 1988, the Illini compiled a 6–5–1 record, finished in third place in the Big Ten Conference, and lost to Florida in the 1988 All-American Bowl. The team's offensive leaders were quarterback Jeff George with 2,257 passing yards, running back Keith Jones with 1,108 rushing yards, and Steve Williams with 523 receiving yards. In 1989, the Illini finished 10–2, capping their season off with a win in the Florida Citrus Bowl.

In 1990, the Illini compiled an 8–4 record, finished in a four-way tie for first place in the Big Ten Conference, were ranked No. 25 in the final AP Poll, and lost to Clemson in the 1991 Hall of Fame Bowl. The team's offensive leaders were quarterback Jason Verduzco with 2,567 passing yards, fullback Howard Griffith with 1,115 rushing yards, and Shawn Wax with 863 receiving yards. In a 56–21 victory against Southern Illinois University on September 22, 1990, Griffith set the NCAA record for touchdowns in a game with eight. In 1991, the Illini enjoyed another non-losing season, finishing 6–6 after losing in the 1991 John Hancock Bowl. Because he was able to turn around the Illini football program, Mackovic received interest from multiple schools regarding their head football coaching position. Mackovic elected to leave Illinois after the 1991 season to accept the head coaching position at Texas.

=== Lou Tepper era (1992–1996) ===
Lou Tepper was promoted from defensive coordinator to head coach of the Illinois in 1992. Tepper was the first Illinois coach since Robert Zuppke to win or tie both of his first two meetings against Michigan. The 1992 game, a 22–22 tie, ended Michigan's 19-game conference winning streak.

Tepper was involved in a series of controversial moves associated with the recruitment of blue-chip quarterback Chris Redman in 1994 and 1995. Redman stated that he had committed to Illinois based on the recruiting efforts of Illini offensive coordinator and former NFL Pro Bowl quarterback Greg Landry. Tepper ignited a controversy when he unexpectedly fired Landry the day after Redman signed his letter of commitment. Tepper denied any attempt to deceive Redman about Landry's future at Illinois and eventually released Redman from his commitment. It would later emerge that Landry had allegedly been soliciting an NFL job behind Tepper's back. The departures of Landry and Redman and the manner in which they left had damaged Tepper's reputation among fans and media. The NCAA decided to void the LOC based on the unusual circumstances, allowing Redman five full years of eligibility and no transfer restrictions. Tepper hired former Ball State head coach and veteran Big Ten assistant Paul Schudel as Landry's replacement. The hiring of Schudel marked the fourth time in six years that the Illini had made a change at offensive coordinator.

Despite Tepper's abilities as a defensive coach, he only put together only two winning seasons in his six years in Champaign. His teams were unable to match the moderate success the Illini had enjoyed under Mackovic and Mike White, and the Illini got progressively worse over his tenure. They placed fourth in the Big Ten Conference in Tepper's first full season, 1992, and finished in fourth, fifth, seventh, and ninth in his remaining years. Tepper was fired after the 1996 season, when the Illini went 2–9 with a 1–7 conference record.

=== Ron Turner era (1997–2004) ===
Chicago Bears offensive coordinator Ron Turner was hired in 1997 to replace Tepper. 1997 saw Illinois go 0–11, the worst season in program history. In 1998, the team again posted a losing record, although it was a 3–8 campaign that bettered the previous year's mark by three games. The '98 campaign was followed by a winning 8–4 season in 1999, which was capped off by a dominant win over Virginia in the MicronPC Bowl.

After a disappointing 2000 season in which the Illini finished 5–6, the Illini finished 10–2 (7–1 conference) behind the arm of quarterback Kurt Kittner in 2001, winning the Big Ten championship. The Illini accepted a berth in the Sugar Bowl, which they lost to LSU, coached by Nick Saban, by a score of 47-34. From 2002 to 2004, the Illini's struggles once again returned, as Turner's teams posted a 5–7 record in 2002, which was followed by a 1–11 campaign in 2003 and a 3–8 mark in 2004. Illinois fired Turner after the 2004 season.

=== Ron Zook era (2005–2011) ===
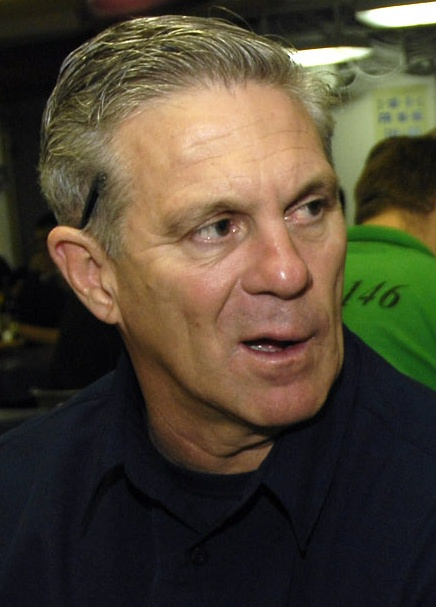
Coach Ron Zook

In 2005, former Florida head coach Ron Zook was hired to replace Turner as head coach. In Zook's inaugural season of 2005, Illinois finished with an overall record of 2–9, and a record of 0–8 in Big Ten games. Despite his team's past struggles, Zook improved the ability of Illinois to recruit top football talent. According to one source, the 2006 recruiting class was one of the 30 best in college football. Despite this, they finished the 2006 season 1–7 in the conference and 2–10 overall. While the record did not improve, the play on the field did as the Illini nearly upset top ranked Ohio State. Additionally, the Illini played well against Iowa, Wisconsin, and Penn State but ended up losing close games (they were down 15–12 at Penn State until Penn State broke open the close game to make it 26–12). The 2006 recruiting class included Isiah "Juice" Williams of Chicago Vocational High School, considered to be one of the top quarterback recruits in the country. In late 2006, Zook signed Arrelious Benn, one of the top wide receiver prospects in the 2007 class. More recently, Zook also won over Simeon High School standout Martez Wilson along with Florida prospect D'Angelo McCray. This class was one of Illinois' best in recent memory, being rated within the top 25 nationally by some experts.

Zook's recruiting success finally began to pay dividends during the 2007 season. After losing a close game on neutral turf to a Missouri squad, the Illini ran off five straight wins, including back-to-back home wins over Penn State and Wisconsin. Illinois' 5–1 start gave them a No. 18 ranking in the AP Poll. This was Illinois' first ranking in the AP Poll since the end of the 2001 season. A homecoming win over Ball State gave the Illini bowl eligibility and a blowout win at Minnesota all but assured Zook's first bowl appearance as coach of the Illini. On November 10, the then-unranked Illini defeated No. 1-ranked Ohio State in Columbus. The Illini finished the 2007 regular season by defeating Northwestern to finish 9–3 overall, 6–2 in the Big Ten. Because Big Ten champion Ohio State football played in the BCS National Championship game, Illinois received a bid to play in the Rose Bowl as the second ranked team in the Big Ten. Their improvement of 7 wins over the 2006 season was the largest such increase of any Division I team. His success earned Zook a contract extension in October 2007, which paid him approximately $1.5 million through the 2013 season. Zook's success on the recruiting trail continued as well, with Illinois having the No. 17 recruiting class in 2008 according to rivals.com. On November 20, 2007, Ron Zook was selected as the Big Ten Coach of the Year. Zook also was awarded the Liberty Mutual Coach of the Year Award following the 2007 season. After making the 2008 Rose Bowl, Illinois was squashed, 49–17, by the USC Trojans, putting a bit of a damper on an otherwise great season.

All-American Jeremy Leman (47) and Illinois' other captains take the field, 2007

Expectations were high for 2008, but Illinois didn't live up to those expectations early on, as they lost to Missouri, 52–42, in their season opener and to Penn State, 38–24. The 2008 Fighting Illini ended up with a 5–7 record (3–5 in conference games) and finishing tied for 6th in the Big Ten. Despite a very disappointing 2008 season, Zook's 2009 Fighting Illini team received AP Poll votes. As they had the previous two years, Illinois started off the season with a loss to Missouri, but this time, the result was far more lopsided than the previous affairs; Missouri won 39–7. Illinois beat Illinois State but then suffered an embarrassing 30–0 shutout at the hands of Ohio State. Illinois lost their next four games by 10 points or more (including a 27–14 loss to Indiana, which was the Hoosiers' only Big Ten win of the season), sinking to 1–6 overall. Zook's team then put together a stunning blowout of the Michigan Wolverines in Memorial Stadium, and followed it up with a 35–32 upset of Minnesota the very next week. After back-to-back wins, the Illini lost their last 3 games to finish the year off at 3-9 (2–6 in Big Ten Play). At the end of the 2009 season, offensive coordinator Mike Schultz was released from his contract, and co-defensive coordinators Dan Disch and Curt Mallory were demoted to position coaches. Illinois hired Paul Petrino as offensive coordinator, and Vic Koenning as defensive coordinator.

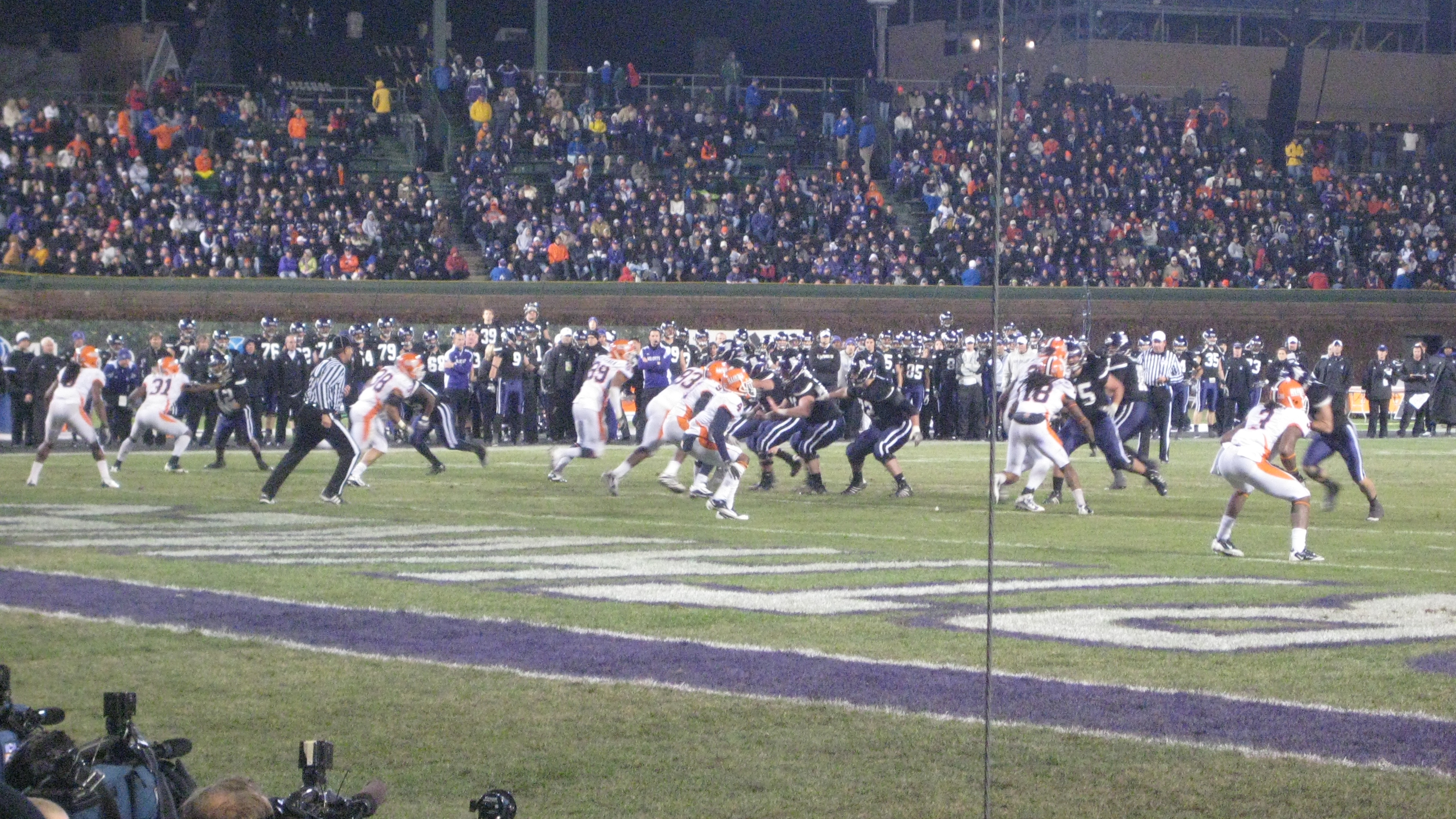
Illinois playing Northwestern at Chicago's Wrigley Field on November 20, 2010

After back-to-back disappointing years, the Illini had almost no pre-season expectations entering 2010. Juice Williams and Arrelious Benn were no longer on the team. However, running back Mikel Leshoure was, and he proved to be an invaluable asset on offense, where Illinois started freshman Nathan Scheelhaase at quarterback. They started off 2010 by losing to Missouri for the fourth consecutive year. After the early loss, Illinois defeated Southern Illinois, 35–3, and Northern Illinois, 28–22. While the Fighting Illini lost to Ohio State in their Big Ten opener, they gave the Buckeyes a scare, knocking out quarterback Terrelle Pryor and holding the Buckeye passing offense almost entirely in check. Illinois then traveled to State College to take on the Nittany Lions, and Illinois had never won in Beaver Stadium prior to 2010. Illinois handed Penn State a stunning 33–13 loss on homecoming. They went on to win the Texas Bowl in a blowout against Baylor.

As the 2011 season begun, the Illini were picked by most experts to finish near the bottom of the newly formed Leaders Division. However, Illinois got off to one of their best starts in history by winning their first six games. After taking care of Arkansas State, 33–15, and blasting South Dakota State, 56–3, the Fighting Illini won a trio of home games by a margin of a field goal over 22nd-ranked Arizona State (17–14), Western Michigan (23–20), and Northwestern (38–35) in a game in which Illinois rallied from a 28–10 deficit in the second half. After defeating Indiana, 41–20, in Illinois' first road game of the season, the Illini were 6–0 for the first time since 1951 and they climbed to 15th in the Coaches' Poll and 16th in the AP Poll. However, the Illini lost, 17–7, to Ohio State and the season seemed headed towards a downward spiral as Illinois lost a pair of close road games at Purdue (21–14) and Penn State (10–7). Illinois returned home and lost to Michigan, 31–14. On the Tuesday before the Wisconsin game, Zook opened his weekly press conference by warning the reporters not to ask questions about his job status. When reporter Shannon Ryan of the Chicago Tribune asked Zook if he had talked to his players about the rumors pertaining to his future, he walked out of the press conference. The Illini went on to lose to Wisconsin and a 27–7 loss to Minnesota. With that loss, Illinois became the first team in NCAA Division I FBS history to start a season 6–0, and end it at 6–6. Zook was fired on November 27, 2011. His final record at Illinois was 34–51. The Illini did receive a bowl invitation and they defeated UCLA in the Kraft Fight Hunger Bowl. It was first time in school history that the football team won back-to-back bowl games.

=== Tim Beckman era (2012–2014) ===
Toledo head coach Tim Beckman was hired as Zook's replacement in December 2011.

At Illinois, Beckman went 12–25 in three seasons, and only won four games in Big Ten play. In his third season, the Illini managed to qualify for a bowl with a 6–6 record, but lost 35–18 to Louisiana Tech in the Heart of Dallas Bowl.

On August 28, 2015—just a week before what was to be his fourth season—Beckman was fired after the preliminary results of an internal investigation substantiated accusations of gross player mistreatment. Most seriously, the investigation found that he'd forced players to play through serious injuries and had the medical staff clear these players too soon. In a statement, Beckman called his ouster a "rush to judgment" that violated the terms of his contract, and stated that he intended to "vigorously defend both my reputation and my legal rights." On April 11, 2016, Beckman settled with the university for a one time payment of $250,000 with the decision of firing "for cause" due to the mistreatment of players standing.

=== Bill Cubit era (2015) ===
On August 28, 2015, Illini offensive coordinator and former Western Michigan head coach Bill Cubit was named head coach at Illinois for the 2015 season after the university fired Tim Beckman for alleged mistreatment of players. On November 28, 2015, Illinois formally named Cubit as its 24th head coach, giving him a two-year, $2.4 million contract.

Cubit went 5–7 in the 2015 season.

On March 5, 2016, the school announced that Cubit had been relieved of his duties. Illinois director of athletics Josh Whitman stated, "I appreciate the leadership that Bill Cubit provided our football program during what has been, unquestionably, a very tumultuous time...Through his efforts, he has kept the program moving forward. Bill is a good man and a good football coach...At this juncture, however, I think it is most important that we position our program for long-term success by creating a more stable environment for the coaches, players, and prospective student-athletes."

=== Lovie Smith era (2016–2020) ===
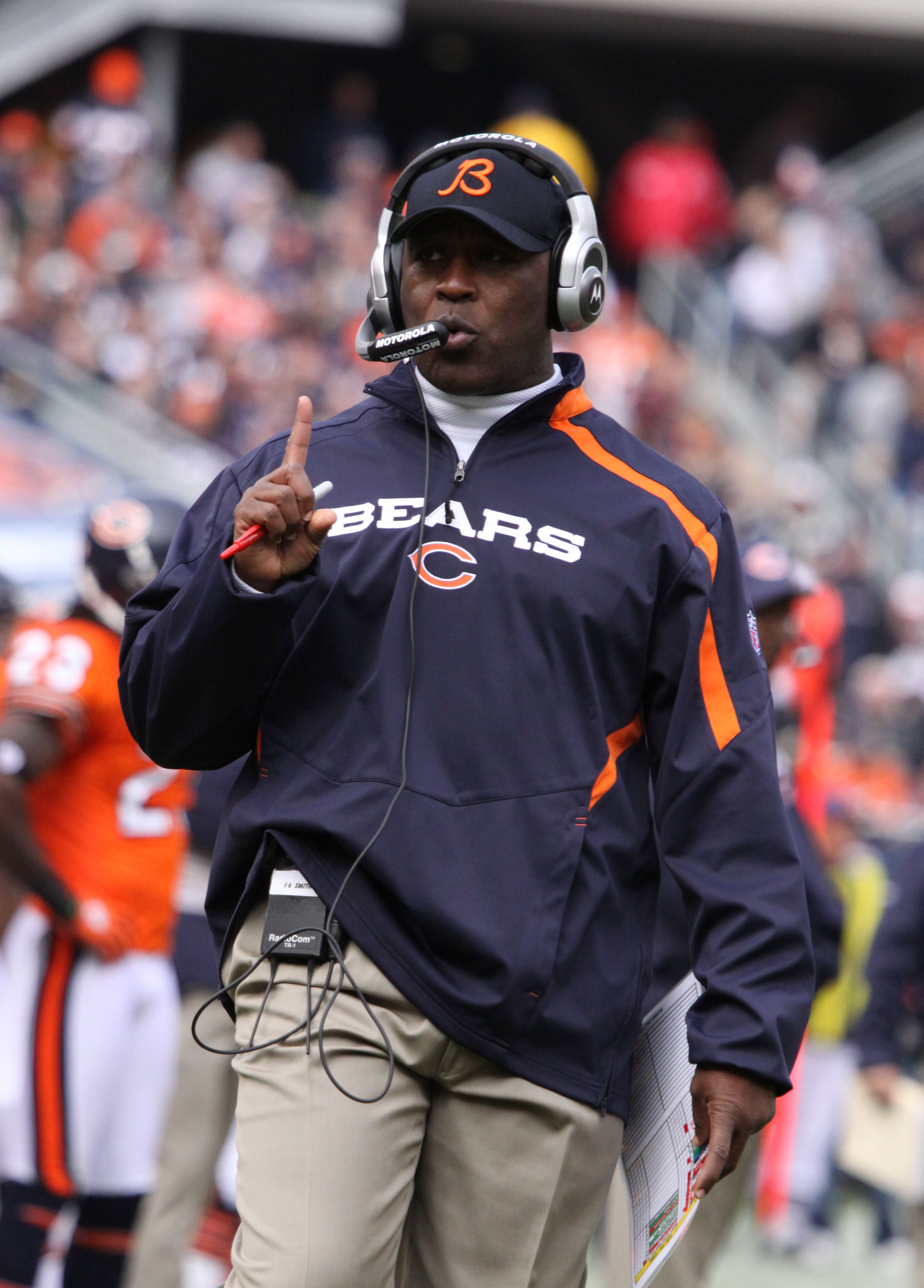
Coach Lovie Smith, appointed in 2016

On March 7, 2016, former head coach of the NFL's Chicago Bears and Tampa Bay Buccaneers Lovie Smith was named Fighting Illini head coach, agreeing to a contract paying $21 million over six years. After five years without a winning record, the hiring of a leader who had taken a professional football team to the Super Bowl invigorated fans and students. Smith's first team posted a 3–9 record.

Smith's second season saw a youth-movement with 10 true freshman starting by the third game of the season, the most in program history. Illinois also played 18 true freshman student athletes overall, tied for the second most in the nation, and posted records of 2–10 overall and 0–9 in Big Ten games. The 2018 Illini improved on their record from the previous year, going 4–8 overall and 2–7 in conference games during Smith's third season. The 2019 team finished the season 6–7 with a loss in the 2019 Redbox Bowl. It was the first bowl game for the University of Illinois football team since 2014. Smith started the season with a 2–5 record and was fired on December 13, 2020. He finished with an overall record of 17–39 in five seasons at Illinois, including a 10–33 record in Big Ten Conference play.

=== Bret Bielema era (2021–present) ===
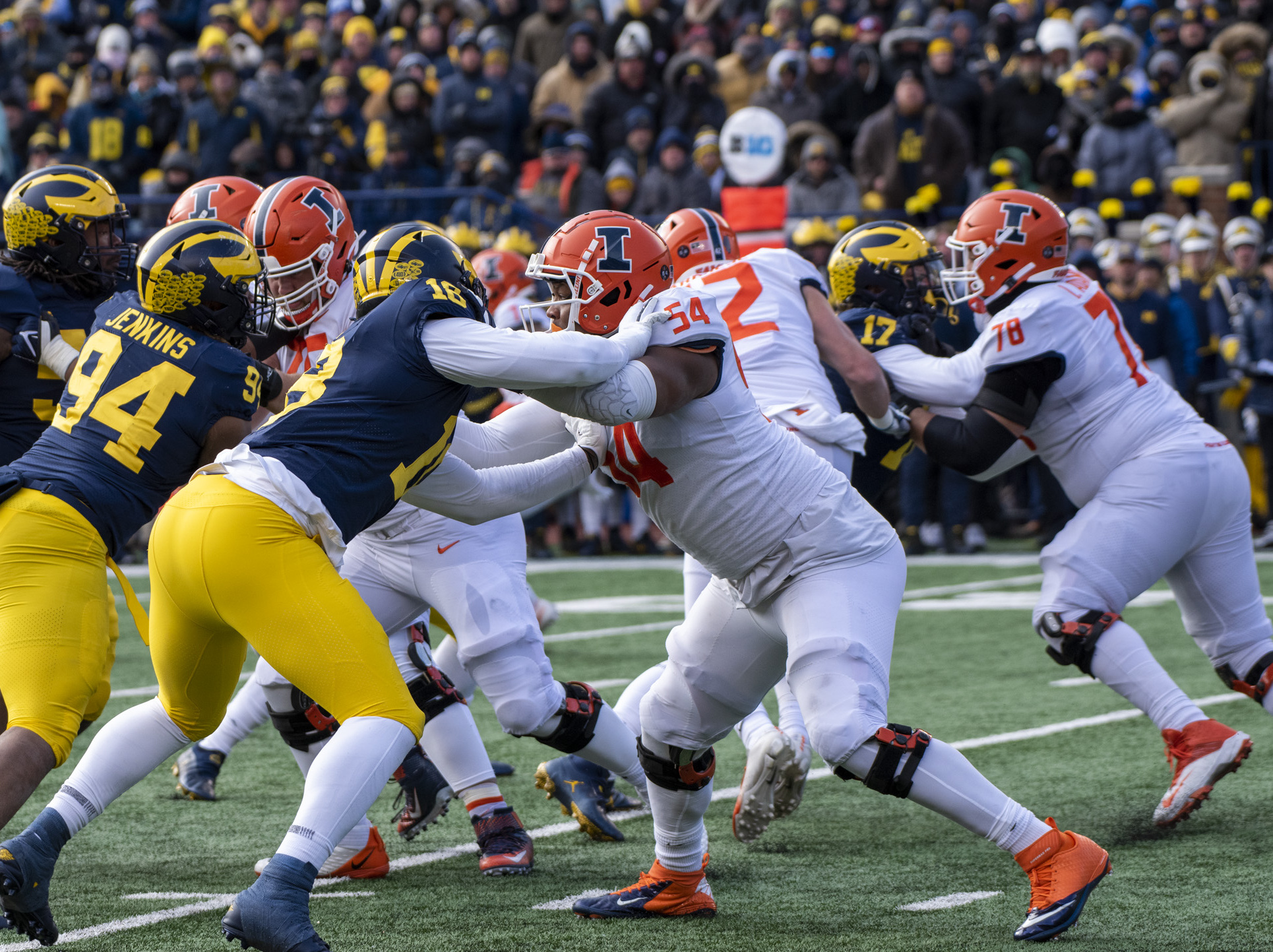
The Illinois offensive line during a 2022 game against Michigan

On December 19, 2020, Bret Bielema was named as the 26th Fighting Illini Head Football Coach. Bielema led Illinois to a 5–7 record in his first year with the Fighting Illini in 2021, including road wins that gained national notoriety over #7 Penn State and #20 Minnesota to give Bielema more AP/CFP ranked wins than any other first-year coach in Illinois history. The Illini won at #7 Penn State, 20-18, in nine overtimes to mark the longest game in college football history. Chase Brown ran for 223 yards, the most ever by a Big Ten opponent at Beaver Stadium, and Brandon Peters connected with Casey Washington in the back of the end zone of the ninth overtime to stun the Penn State crowd. Two games later, Illinois earned its first ever win over a College Football Playoff ranked opponent by taking down #20 Minnesota, 14-6, in Minneapolis behind a dominant effort by the defense.

== Conference affiliations ==
- Independent (1890–1895)
- Big Ten Conference (1896–present)
  - Western Conference (1896–1952)
  - Big Ten Conference (1953–present)

== Championships ==
=== National championships ===
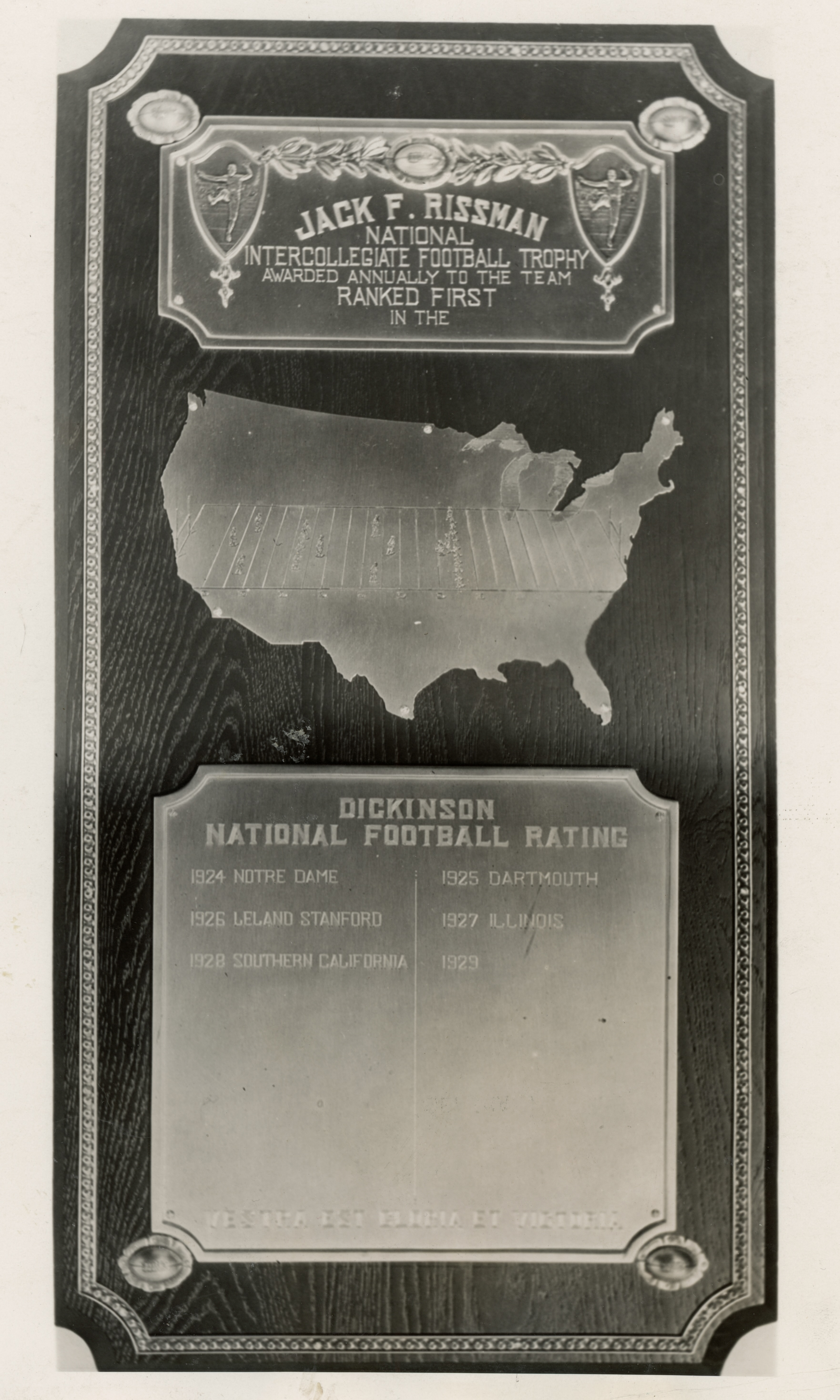
Jack F. Rissman Trophy awarded to Illinois for 1927 as Dickinson System national champions.

Illinois has been selected as national champions in five seasons (1914, 1919, 1923, 1927, 1951) by NCAA-designated major selectors, often using mathematical algorithms. Illinois claims championships for all five years. Almost all college football title selections before 1928 were retrospective (selected years or decades later), and that is the case here. Only Dickinson in 1927 and Boand in 1951 were contemporaneous. Selection of consensus champions began in 1950.

The Fighting Illini have never finished a season ranked No. 1 in either the AP Poll or Coaches' Poll.

Year	Coach	Selector	Record	Bowl game	Final AP	Final Coaches
1914	Bob Zuppke	Billingsley, Parke Davis (both co-champions)	7–0		–	–
1919	Bob Zuppke	Billingsley, Boand, Football Researchers, Parke Davis, Sagarin (all co-champions except Boand)	6–1		–	–
1923	Bob Zuppke	Berryman, Boand, Football Researchers, Helms, National Championship Foundation, Parke Davis, Sagarin (Berryman, NCF, Sagarin co-champions)	8–0		–	–
1927	Bob Zuppke	Billingsley, Dickinson, Helms, National Championship Foundation, Parke Davis	7–0–1		–	–
1951	Ray Eliot	Boand (co-champion)	9–0–1	W Rose Bowl	No. 4	No. 3

=== Conference championships ===
Illinois has won 15 conference championships, eight outright and seven shared.

Year	Conference	Coach	Conference record	Overall record
1910†	Western Conference	Arthur Hall	4–0	7–0
1914	Western Conference	Bob Zuppke	6–0	7–0
1915†	Western Conference	Bob Zuppke	3–0–2	5–0–2
1918†	Western Conference	Bob Zuppke	4–0	5–2
1919	Western Conference	Bob Zuppke	6–1	6–1
1923†	Western Conference	Bob Zuppke	5–0	8–0
1927†	Western Conference	Bob Zuppke	5–0	7–0–1
1928	Western Conference	Bob Zuppke	4–1	7–1
1946	Western Conference	Ray Eliot	6–1	8–2
1951	Big Ten Conference	Ray Eliot	5–0–1	9–0–1
1953†	Big Ten Conference	Ray Eliot	5–1	7–1–1
1963	Big Ten Conference	Pete Elliott	5–1–1	8–1–1
1983	Big Ten Conference	Mike White	9–0	10–2
1990†	Big Ten Conference	John Mackovic	6–2	8–4
2001	Big Ten Conference	Ron Turner	7–1	10–2

† Co-champions

== Bowl games ==
As of the end of the 2025 season Illinois has participated in 22 bowl games, with the Fighting Illini having a record of 10–12.

Season	Coach	Bowl	Opponent	Result
1946	Ray Eliot	Rose Bowl	UCLA	W 45–14
1951	Ray Eliot	Rose Bowl	Stanford	W 40–7
1963	Pete Elliott	Rose Bowl	Washington	W 17–7
1982	Mike White	Liberty Bowl	Alabama	L 15–21
1983	Mike White	Rose Bowl	UCLA	L 9–45
1985	Mike White	Peach Bowl	Army	L 29–31
1988	John Mackovic	All-American Bowl	Florida	L 10–14
1989	John Mackovic	Florida Citrus Bowl	Virginia	W 31–21
1990	John Mackovic	Hall of Fame Bowl	Clemson	L 0–30
1991	Lou Tepper	John Hancock Bowl	UCLA	L 3–6
1992	Lou Tepper	Holiday Bowl	Hawai'i	L 17–27
1994	Lou Tepper	Liberty Bowl	East Carolina	W 30–0
1999	Ron Turner	MicronPC.com Bowl	Virginia	W 63–21
2001	Ron Turner	Sugar Bowl	LSU	L 34–47
2007	Ron Zook	Rose Bowl	USC	L 17–49
2010	Ron Zook	Texas Bowl	Baylor	W 38–14
2011	Vic Koenning (interim)	Fight Hunger Bowl	UCLA	W 20–14
2014	Tim Beckman	Heart of Dallas Bowl	Louisiana Tech	L 18–35
2019	Lovie Smith	Redbox Bowl	California	L 20–35
2022	Bret Bielema	ReliaQuest Bowl	Mississippi State	L 10–19
2024	Bret Bielema	Citrus Bowl	South Carolina	W 21–17
2025	Bret Bielema	Music City Bowl	Tennessee	W 30–28

== Rivalries ==
Illinois has six series against teams that generally are considered their rival in some form, with five of their rivals being in the Big Ten Conference.

=== Indiana ===
While not as intense as the men's basketball rivalry between the schools, the football rivalry between Illinois and Indiana dates back to 1899 and has been played 73 times. When the Big Ten split into non-geographical divisions in 2011, both the Fighting Illini and Hoosiers were placed in the "Leaders" division, thereby ensuring an annual meeting on the football field. However, when the Big Ten opted for a divisional format based on geography three years later, Illinois was placed in the "West" division with Indiana placed in the "East", making the series intermittent once again. Illinois leads the all-time series 46–25–2.

=== Iowa ===
The series dates back to the first meeting in 1899 and has been played 79 times. When the Big Ten split into non-geographical "Leaders" and "Legends" divisions in 2011, The Illini and Hawkeyes were placed in opposite divisions and weren't designated as protected annual cross-divisional so the series became intermittent again. However, in 2014, the conference scrapped that divisional format in favor of a more geographically friendly "East" and West" divisional arrangement. In so doing, the Big Ten placed both Illinois and Iowa in the West division which revived the annual rivalry once again.

Perhaps the 1952 game is the most notable matchup in the history of the football rivalry. Illinois won 33–13, but the game is more known for egregious Hawkeye penalties, angry Iowa fans throwing apples at Illini football players and a punch thrown between players on both teams that lead to the Big Ten suspending the series indefinitely. The conference would not lift the indefinite suspension until 1967, the longest break in the history of the football rivalry.

=== Michigan ===
The history and rivalry between Illinois and Michigan has been marked by crazy games, upsets, and tensions between the two schools and fanbases. The first game was played in 1898 in Detroit, which the Wolverines won 12–5, and both teams played each other for 73 consecutive years from 1924 to 1996. In their most recent meeting in 2024, Illinois won 21–7 in Champaign. Michigan leads the series, 72–24–2.

=== Missouri ===
The rivalry between Illinois and Missouri is modeled after the two schools' longstanding basketball rivalry, and it garners the most interest around St. Louis, with both schools having alumni and fans in the area. It has not been played annually, with 24 matchups occurring from 1896 to 2010, with Missouri leading the series 17–7. Between 2000 and 2010, the schools met in St. Louis six times, with Missouri winning each time. In 2026, the series will be renewed for a four-year period, to be played on campus sites.

=== Northwestern ===
Northwestern is Illinois' most played and biggest rival and the series began in 1892 with the two teams having played each other 112 times. Illinois leads the series 59–55–5 as of 2025. The original trophy was the Sweet Sioux Tomahawk utilized from 1947 to 2008, until it was replaced with the Land of Lincoln Trophy in 2009. The Fighting Illini have had periods of dominance in the series, notably winning 11 of 12 matchups from 1908 to 1928.

=== Ohio State ===
The rivalry with Ohio State has occurred since 1902, with the Illibuck, a carved wooden trophy, being a reflection of its longevity, being the 2nd oldest trophy awarded for a Big Ten rivalry game. Ohio State leads the series 68–30–4 (not including the 2010 vacated win), with Ohio State having won the last eight games played. They were members of the same Division (Leaders) upon expansion in 2011, but they were separated in 2014, meaning that they do not meet up each year, although they are guaranteed to meet at least once in a four-year period. Illinois has had varied success in this rivalry, notably winning five straight from 1988 to 1992, although they have not beaten Ohio State since 2007, when Illinois beat No. 1 Ohio State in Columbus.

=== Purdue ===
The rivalry with Purdue is the oldest of the four, with their first meeting being in 1890. Illinois has had varied success, such as winning 11 out of 12 games played between 1900 and 1911 and winning six straight from 1988 to 1993. Purdue leads the series, 47–45–6.

== Individual honors ==
- Sporting News Player of the Year

Dick Butkus – 1964
Jim Grabowski – 1965

- Sammy Baugh Trophy

Jeff George – 1989

- Butkus Award

Dana Howard – 1994
Kevin Hardy – 1995

- Ted Hendricks Award

Whitney Mercilus – 2011

- CFPA National Defensive Performer of the Year

Whitney Mercilus – 2011

- CFPA Running Back Trophy

Mikel Leshoure – 2010

- Heisman Trophy finalists

Buddy Young – 1944... 5th
Bill Burrell – 1959... 4th
Dick Butkus – 1964... 3rd
Jim Grabowski – 1965... 3rd
Tony Eason – 1982... 8th

- Rose Bowl Most Valuable Player

George Halas – 1919
Buddy Young & Julius Rykovich – 1946
Bill Tate – 1951
Jim Grabowski – 1964

- Chicago Tribune Silver Football

Red Grange – 1924
Alex Agase – 1946
Bill Burrell – 1959
Dick Butkus – 1963
Jim Grabowski – 1965
Don Thorp – 1983
Rashard Mendenhall – 2007

- Big Ten Defensive Player of the Year

Moe Gardner – 1990
Darrick Brownlow – 1990
Dana Howard – 1993 & 1994
Johnny Newton - 2023

- Big Ten Freshman of the Year

Simeon Rice – 1992
Arrelious Benn – 2007

- Big Ten Defensive Lineman of the Year

Moe Gardner – 1989
Simeon Rice – 1994

- Walter Camp Coach of the Year Award

Mike White – 1983

- Liberty Mutual Coach of the Year Award

Ron Zook – 2007

- Big Ten Coach of the Year

Mike White – 1983
John Mackovic – 1988 & 1989
Ron Turner – 2001
Ron Zook – 2007

== Retired numbers ==
Illinois has retired two jersey numbers.

Illinois Fighting Illini retired numbers
No.	Player	Pos.	Tenure	Ref.
50	Dick Butkus	C/LB	1962–1964	
77	Red Grange	HB	1923–1925	

== Consensus All-Americans ==
- Ralph Chapman – 1914
- Perry Graves – 1914
- Bart Macomber – 1915
- John Depler – 1918
- Chuck Carney – 1920
- Jim McMillen – 1923
- Red Grange – 1923, 1924, 1925
- Bernie Shively – 1926
- Alex Agase – 1946
- Johnny Karras – 1951
- J.C. Caroline – 1953
- Bill Burrell – 1959
- Dick Butkus – 1963, 1964
- Jim Grabowski – 1965
- David Williams – 1984, 1985
- Moe Gardner – 1989, 1990
- Dana Howard – 1994
- Kevin Hardy – 1995
- J Leman – 2007
- Whitney Mercilus – 2011
- Devon Witherspoon – 2022
- Jer'Zhan Newton — 2023

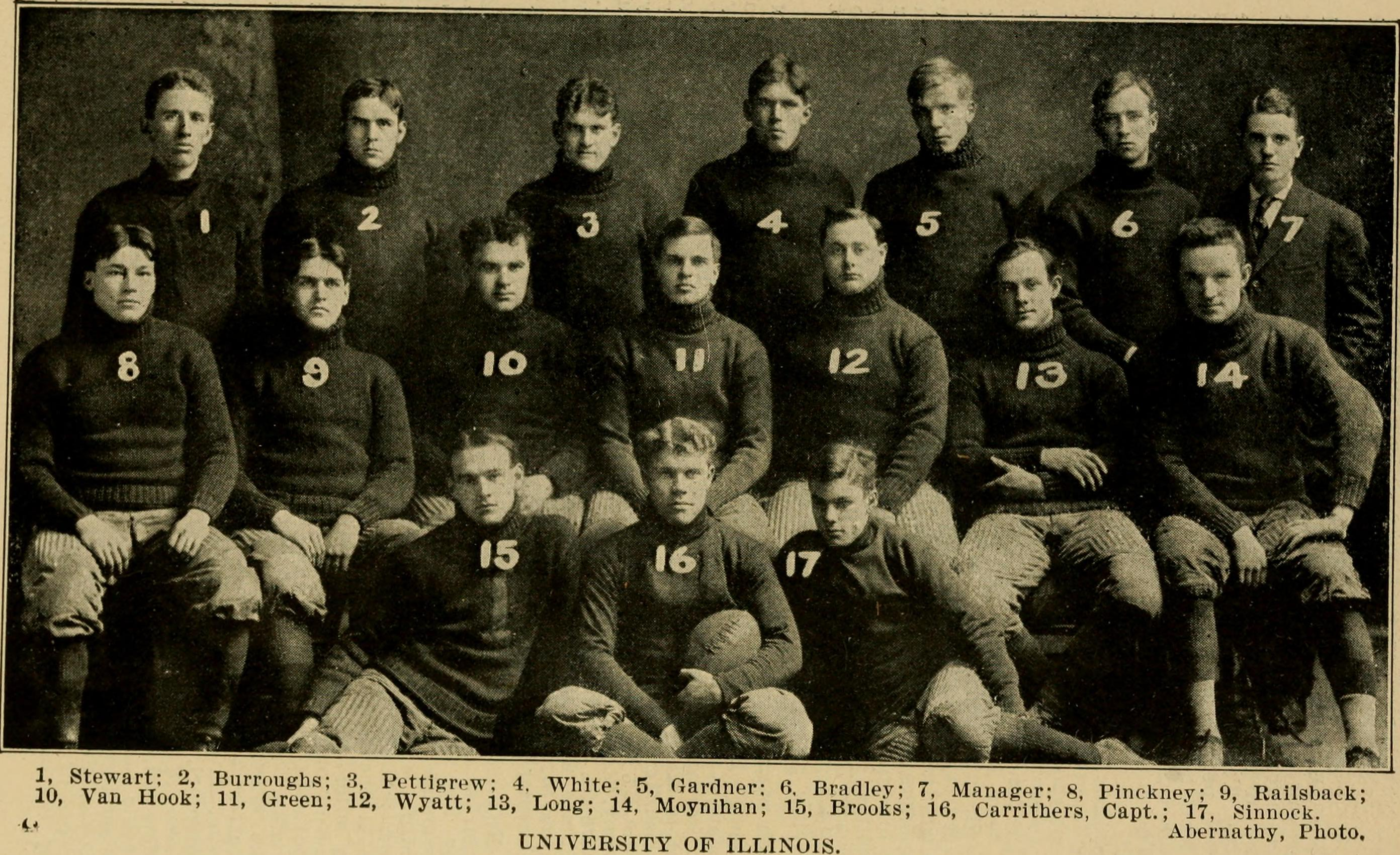
1904 NCAA football guide featuring Illini Football. The guide was the official rules book and record book of college football.

== Hall of Fame inductees ==
=== College Football Hall of Fame ===
The following 17 Illinois players and coaches have been inducted to the College Football Hall of Fame.

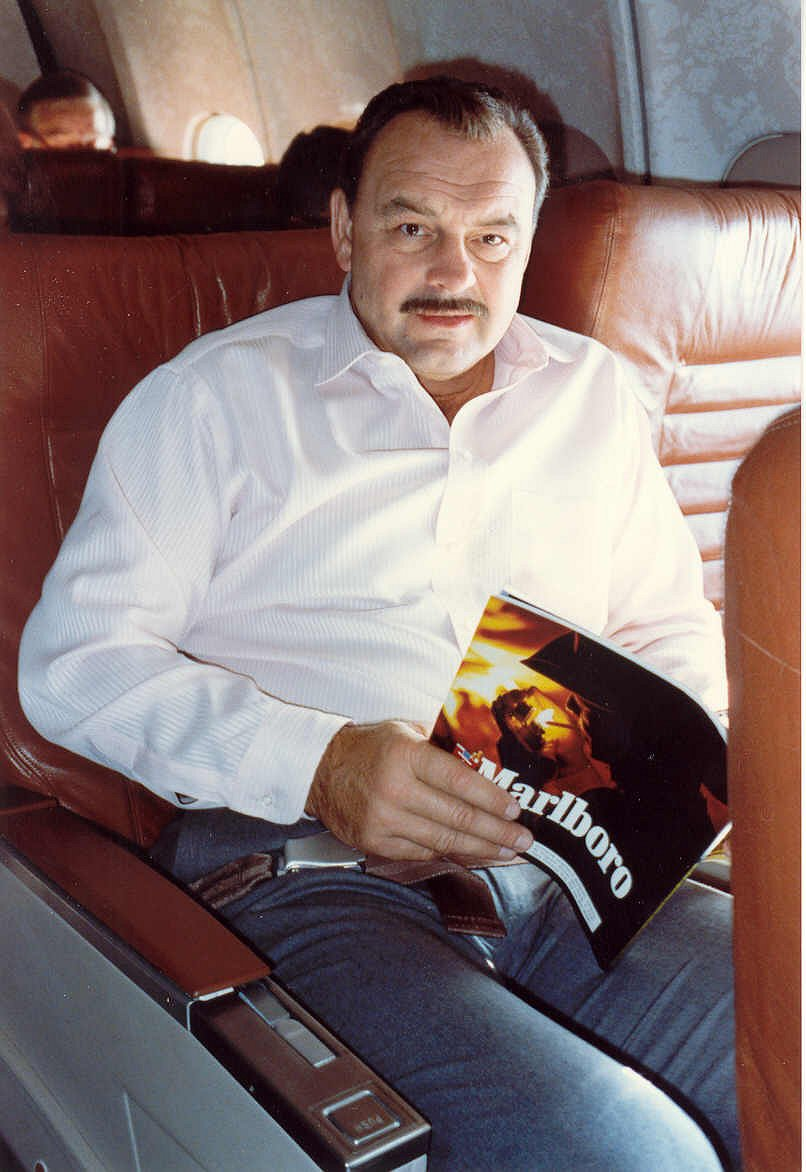
LB Dick Butkus (1962–1964)

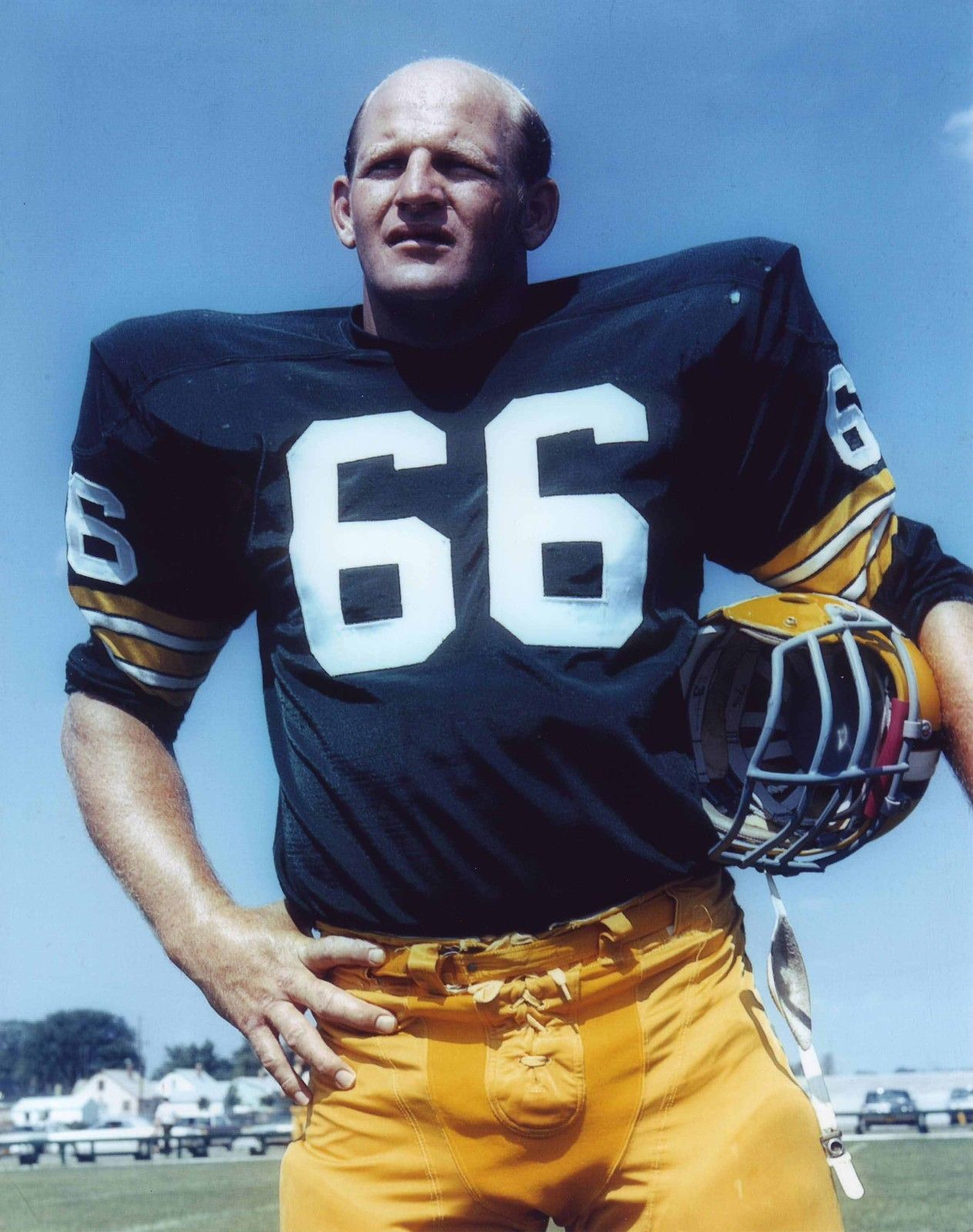
LB Ray Nitschke (1956–1957)

Name	Years	Position	Induction
Red Grange	1923–1925	HB	1951
Edward K. Hall	1892–1893	Head coach	1951
Robert Zuppke	1913–1941	Head coach	1951
Alex Agase	1941–1942; 1946	G	1963
George Woodruff	1903	Head coach	1963
Chuck Carney	1918–1921	End	1966
Claude "Buddy" Young	1944, 1946	HB	1968
Bart Macomber	1914–1916	HB	1972
J.C. Caroline	1953–1954	HB	1980
Bernie Shively	1924–1926	G	1982
Dick Butkus	1962–1964	LB	1983
Bob Blackman	1971–1976	Head coach	1987
Jim Grabowski	1963–1965	FB	1995
Al Brosky	1950–1952	S	1998
David Williams	1983–1985	G	2005
Dana Howard	1991-1994	LB	2018
Moe Gardner	1987-1990	DT	2022

=== Pro Football Hall of Fame ===
Illinois has six inductees.

Name	Position	Induction	Ref.
Red Grange	HB	1963	
George Halas	End	1963	
Hugh "Shorty" Ray	NFL rules	1966	
Ray Nitschke	LB	1978	
Dick Butkus	LB	1979	
Bobby Mitchell	HB	1983	

== All-century team ==
November 2, 1990 - The University of Illinois announced its 25-man All-Century Football Team as voted on by fans.

- Alex Agase, G
- Mike Bass, K
- Dan Beaver, K
- Chuck Bennis, G
- Al Brosky, S
- Dick Butkus, LB/C
- J.C. Caroline, HB
- Doug Dieken, TE
- Tony Eason, QB
- Dike Eddleman, P
- Moe Gardner, NT
- Jeff George, QB
- Jim Grabowski, FB
- Red Grange, HB
- George Halas, E
- Burt Ingwersen, T
- Jim Juriga, G
- John Karras, HB
- Ray Nitschke, FB/LB
- Ed O'Bradovich, E/P
- Scott Studwell, LB
- Don Thorp, DT
- David Williams, WR
- Dave Wilson, QB
- Buddy Young, RB

Fighting Illini in the NFL/AFL
NFL Draft selections
Top 5 Draft Picks	8
1st round:	23
Total Playing:	26
Total NFL Players:	301
Notable achievements
Illini in the Super Bowl:	39
Pro Football Hall of Famers:	6
College Football Hall of Famers:	15

== Active alumni in the NFL ==
- Isaiah Adams (Arizona Cardinals)
- Tony Adams (Tennessee Titans)
- Nick Allegretti (Washington Commanders)
- Luke Altmyer (Detroit Lions)
- Tanner Arkin (New England Patriots)
- Chase Brown (Cincinnati Bengals)
- Sydney Brown (Atlanta Falcons)
- Pat Bryant (Denver Broncos)
- J. C. Davis (New York Giants)
- Tommy DeVito (New England Patriots)
- TeRah Edwards (Carolina Panthers)
- Milo Eifler (Tennessee Titans)
- Josh Gesky (New York Giants)
- Kendrick Green (New York Giants)
- Jake Hansen (Houston Texans)
- Nate Hobbs (San Francisco 49ers)
- Gabe Jacas (New England Patriots)
- Kerby Joseph (Detroit Lions)
- Ted Karras (Cincinnati Bengals)
- Vederian Lowe (San Francisco 49ers)
- Quan Martin (Washington Commanders)
- Chase McLaughlin (Tampa Bay Buccaneers)
- Jer'Zhan Newton (Washington Commanders)
- Alex Palczewski (Denver Broncos)
- Del'Shawn Phillips (Los Angeles Chargers)
- Tip Reiman (Arizona Cardinals)
- Miles Scott (Denver Broncos)
- Dawuane Smoot (New York Giants)
- James Thompson Jr. (San Francisco 49ers)
- Malik Turner (San Francisco 49ers)
- Jihad Ward (New York Giants)
- Casey Washington (Carolina Panthers)
- Isaiah Williams (New York Jets)
- Devon Witherspoon (Seattle Seahawks)

== Other notable players ==
- Ron Acks – former NFL LB
- Mel Agee – former NFL DT, DE
- Clarence Appelgran – former APFA G
- Tim Brewster – former head coach, University of Minnesota
- Bill Brown – former NFL HB
- Shorty Burdick – former NFL T
- Bill Burrell – former CFL LB, G
- Darryl Byrd – former NFL LB
- Reggie Corbin - USFL RB for the Michigan Panthers
- Matt Cushing – former NFL TE
- Vontae Davis – former NFL CB
- Bobby Dawson – former CFL DB
- Tommy DeVito – NFL QB for the New York Giants
- Ken Dilger – former NFL TE
- Greg Engel – former NFL C
- Kevin Hardy – former NFL LB
- Howard Griffith – former NFL FB; football analyst
- John Holecek – former NFL LB; head coach, Loyola Academy
- Brad Hopkins – former NFL OT; football analyst
- Kurt Kittner – former NFL QB; football analyst
- Sam Knox – former NFL G
- J Leman – former NFL LB; football analyst
- Mikel Leshoure – former NFL RB
- Brandon Lloyd – former NFL WR
- Ernie McMillan – former NFL OT
- Preston Pearson – former NFL RB, WR, KR
- Frosty Peters – former NFL Back
- Simeon Rice – former NFL DE
- Jack Trudeau – former NFL QB
- Tim Simpson – former NFL OG, C
- Jack Squirek – former NFL LB
- Jason Verduzco – former CFL QB; former college and NFL assistant coach
- Steve Weatherford – former NFL P; sports broadcaster
- Josh Whitman – former NFL TE; athletic director, University of Illinois
- Eugene Wilson – former NFL DB, S
- Kirby Wilson – former CFL DB; head coach, USFL Pittsburgh Maulers

== Media ==
Illini football games are shown via the Illini Sports Network, which brings the Illini to stations across Illinois. Locally, the team's games are shown on WDWS-AM 1400 and WHMS-FM 97.5. WDWS has been the Illini's exclusive radio station in Champaign since 1935. WHMS has aired Illini games since the 1950s. The team's student newspaper is the Daily Illini, while outside coverage is handled by The News-Gazette.

== Future opponents ==
Year	Non-conference opponents			Big Ten home games					Big Ten away games				
2026	UAB (9/5)	Duke (9/12)	Southern Illinois (9/19)	Iowa	Nebraska	Oregon	Purdue	N/A	Maryland	Michigan State	Northwestern	Ohio State	UCLA
2027	FIU (8/28)	at Notre Dame (9/4)	Delaware (9/11)	Indiana	Northwestern	Penn State	UCLA	Wisconsin	Michigan	Minnesota	Purdue	USC	N/A
2028	Notre Dame (9/2)	Illinois State (TBD)	Ohio (TBD)	Michigan State	Ohio State	Purdue	Washington	N/A	Indiana	Iowa	Northwestern	Oregon	Rutgers
2029	Buffalo (9/8)	at Missouri (9/15)	TBD										
2030	Southern Illinois (8/30)	TBD	TBD										
2031	TBD	TBD	TBD										
2032	Western Michigan (9/4)	TBD	TBD										
2033	at Missouri (9/17)	TBD	TBD										
2034	Missouri (9/16)	TBD	TBD										
2035	at Missouri (9/15)	TBD	TBD										
