= 1991 Illinois Fighting Illini football team =

American college football season

1991 Illinois Fighting Illini football

John Hancock Bowl, L 3–6 vs. UCLA
- Conference: Big Ten Conference
- Record: 6–6 (4–4 Big Ten)
- Head coach: John Mackovic (4th season; regular season); Lou Tepper (interim, bowl game)
- Offensive coordinator: Gene Dahlquist (4th season)
- Defensive coordinator: Lou Tepper (4th season)
- MVP: Kameno Bell
- Captains: Mike Hopkins; Marlon Primous; Tim Simpson
- Home stadium: Memorial Stadium

1991 Big Ten Conference football standings
	Conf.					Overall
Team	W		L		T	W		L		T
No. 6 Michigan $	8	–	0	–	0	10	–	2	–	0
No. 10 Iowa	7	–	1	–	0	10	–	1	–	1
Ohio State	5	–	3	–	0	8	–	4	–	0
Indiana	5	–	3	–	0	7	–	4	–	1
Illinois	4	–	4	–	0	6	–	6	–	0
Purdue	3	–	5	–	0	4	–	7	–	0
Michigan State	3	–	5	–	0	3	–	8	–	0
Wisconsin	2	–	6	–	0	5	–	6	–	0
Northwestern	2	–	6	–	0	3	–	8	–	0
Minnesota	1	–	7	–	0	2	–	9	–	0
$ – Conference champion; Rankings from AP Poll

The 1991 Illinois Fighting Illini football team was an American football team that represented the University of Illinois at Urbana-Champaign as a member of the Big Ten Conference during the 1991 NCAA Division I-A football season. In their fourth and final year under head coach John Mackovic, the Fighting Illini compiled a 6–6 record (4–4 in conference games), finished in fifth place in the Big Ten, and outscored opponents by a total of 261 to 182.

Quarterback Jason Verduzco led the Big Ten with 235 pass completions, 382 pass attempts, and 2,825 passing yards. The team's other statistical leaders included running back Kameno Bell (642 rushing yards, 60 receptions), wide receiver Elbert Turner (646 receiving yards), and kicker Chris Richardson (68 points scored, 29 of 31 extra points, 12 of 17 field goals).

The team played its home games at Memorial Stadium in Champaign, Illinois.

== Schedule ==
Date	Time	Opponent	Rank	Site	TV	Result	Attendance	Source
August 31	3:00 pm	East Carolina*		Memorial Stadium; Champaign, IL	ESPN	W 38–31	46,313	
September 14	1:00 pm	at Missouri*		Faurot Field; Columbia, MO		L 19–23	49,586	
September 21	2:30 pm	No. 21 Houston*		Memorial Stadium; Champaign, IL	ABC	W 51–10	60,182	
October 5	11:30 am	Minnesota		Memorial Stadium; Champaign, IL	ESPN	W 24–3	57,981	
October 12	2:30 pm	No. 11 Ohio State	No. 20	Memorial Stadium; Champaign, IL	ABC	W 10–7	70,125	
October 19	2:30 pm	at No. 15 Iowa	No. 13	Kinnick Stadium; Iowa City, IA	ABC	L 21–24	70,220	
October 26	1:00 pm	at Northwestern	No. 17	Dyche Stadium; Evanston, IL (rivalry)		L 11–17	26,542	
November 2	1:00 pm	Wisconsin		Memorial Stadium; Champaign, IL		W 22–6	61,493	
November 9	12:00 pm	at Purdue		Ross–Ade Stadium; West Lafayette, IN (rivalry)		W 41–14	33,152	
November 16	2:30 pm	No. 4 Michigan	No. 25	Memorial Stadium; Champaign, IL (rivalry)	ABC	L 0–20	66,757	
November 23	12:05 pm	at Michigan State		Spartan Stadium; East Lansing, MI		L 24–27	61,721	
December 31	1:30 pm	vs. No. 22 UCLA*		Sun Bowl; El Paso, TX (John Hancock Bowl)	CBS	L 3–6	42,281	
*Non-conference game; Rankings from AP Poll released prior to the game; All times are in Central time

== Roster ==
1991 Illinois Fighting Illini football team roster
Players
Coaches
Offense

Pos.	#	Name	Class
OT	87	Ken Dilger	Fr
OT	79	Brad Hopkins	Jr
C	69	Tim Simpson	Sr

Defense

Pos.	#	Name	Class

Special teams

Pos.	#	Name	Class

Head coach

- John Mackovic

Coordinators/assistant coaches

Legend

- (C) Team captain
- (S) Suspended
- (I) Ineligible
- Injured
- Redshirt

== After the season ==
=== NFL draft ===
The following Fighting Illini were selected in the 1992 NFL draft after the season.

Round	Pick	Player	Position	NFL team
7	189	Elbert Tuener	Wide receiver	Houston Oilers
12	328	Kameno Bell	Running back	Miami Dolphins
12	329	Tim Simpson	Center	Cleveland Browns
