= DeChane Cameron =

American gridiron football player (born 1969)

Profile
- Position: Quarterback

Personal information
- Born: March 7, 1969 (age 57); LaGrange, Georgia, U.S.

Career information
- High school: LaGrange (GA)
- College: Clemson

Career history
- 1992: Edmonton Eskimos

Career statistics
- TD–INT: 0–1
- Passing yards: 27

DeChane Cameron (born March 7, 1969) is an American former professional football quarterback in the Canadian Football League (CFL). He played for the Edmonton Eskimos. Cameron played college football at Clemson.

Cameron was the MVP of the 1991 Hall of Fame Bowl.
