= 1994 Liberty Bowl =

1994 St. Jude Liberty Bowl
- 36th Liberty Bowl
Illinois Fighting Illini	East Carolina Pirates
(6–5)	(7–4)
Big Ten	Independent
30	0
Head coach: Lou Tepper	Head coach: Steve Logan
	1	2	3	4	Total
Illinois	14	10	6	0	30
East Carolina	0	0	0	0	0
- Date: December 31, 1994
- Season: 1994
- Stadium: Liberty Bowl Memorial Stadium
- Location: Memphis, Tennessee
- MVP: Illinois QB Johnny Johnson
- Attendance: 46,212

United States TV coverage
- Network: ESPN
- Announcers: Gary Thorne and Mike Mayock

The 1994 Liberty Bowl was held on December 31, 1994, in Memphis, Tennessee, at Liberty Bowl Memorial Stadium. The 36th edition of the Liberty Bowl, the game featured the Illinois Fighting Illini of the Big Ten Conference and the East Carolina Pirates, a football independent. Illinois won the game, 30–0.

Illinois was led by head coach Lou Tepper and quarterback Johnny Johnson, and had lost its final two regular season games. The program was making its twelfth bowl appearance, and its sixth bowl appearance in seven years, having lost its previous three bowls. East Carolina was led by head coach Steve Logan, and had won its final two regular season games. This was the eighth bowl game in Pirates' team history.

== Game summary ==
The Illini took a 14-0 first-quarter lead on Johnny Johnson touchdown passes to Ken Dilger and Jasper Strong. In the second quarter the Illini added a Chris Richardson field goal and a touchdown reception by Jason Dulick to pull away, 24-0. Illinois' final score came in the third quarter on another Johnson TD strike, this time to Ty Douthard. Johnson's four touchdown passes and 250 yards passing earned him Most Valuable Offensive Player and Most Valuable Player of the Game honors. The Illini defense forced four interceptions and a fumble, allowing a total of only 271 total yards. All-American linebacker Simeon Rice led the way with 10 tackles. The Liberty Bowl was the Illini's first Bowl victory since 1990. Illinois' 30-0 victory was the most lopsided win in Liberty Bowl history and was the only shutout posted among the 1994-95 bowls.

== Scoring summary ==
Quarter	Team	Scoring summary	Score	
Quarter	Team	Scoring summary	Illinois	East Carolina
1	Illinois	Ken Dilger 17-yard touchdown reception from Johnny Johnson, Chris Richardson kick good	7	0
1	Illinois	Jasper Strong 73-yard touchdown reception from Johnny Johnson, Chris Richardson kick good	14	0
2	Illinois	Chris Richardson 21-yard field goal	17	0
2	Illinois	Jason Dulick 5-yard touchdown reception from Johnny Johnson, Chris Richardson kick good	24	0
3	Illinois	Ty Douthard 30-yard touchdown reception from Johnny Johnson, Chris Richardson kick no good	30	0
4			30	0
			30	0

== Statistics ==
=== Team statistics ===
(Rushing-Passing-Total): UI - 134-255-389; ECU - 92-179-271

=== Individual statistical leaders ===
Rushing (Att.-Yds.-TD): UI - Ty Douthard 13-52-0; Robert Holcombe 12- 46-0; ECU - Marcus Crandell 41-20-4-0-179.

Passing (Att.-Comp.-Int.-TD-Yds.): UI - Johnny Johnson 30-18-0-4-250; Scott Weaver 4-2-0-0-5; ECU - Marcus Crandell 41-20-4-0-179.

Receiving (No.-Yds.-TD): UI - Jasper Strong 3-96-1, Ken Dilger 7-60-1, Jason Dulick 3-30-1; ECU - Scott Richards 4-25-0, Jason Nichols 6-55-0.
