= Mike Wells (quarterback) =

American football player (born 1951)

No. 15
- Position: Quarterback

Personal information
- Born: June 18, 1951 (age 75); Normal, Illinois, U.S.
- Listed height: 6 ft 5 in (1.96 m)
- Listed weight: 225 lb (102 kg)

Career information
- High school: Normal Community
- College: Illinois
- NFL draft: 1973: 4th round, 80th overall pick

Career history
- Minnesota Vikings (1973–1974)*; New York Giants (1975)*; St. Louis Cardinals (1977)*; Cincinnati Bengals (1977)
- * Offseason or practice squad member only

Awards and highlights
- First-team All-Big Ten (1972)
- Stats at Pro Football Reference

Michael Eugene Wells (born June 18, 1951) is an American former professional football player who was a quarterback in the National Football League (NFL). He played college football for the Illinois Fighting Illini and was selected by the Minnesota Vikings in the fourth round of the 1973 NFL draft, but did not appear in a Vikings regular-season game. He played for the Cincinnati Bengals in 1977 but saw very limited action.

Wells was a high-school football All American at Normal Community High School in Normal, Illinois, before going on to play college football at the University of Illinois Urbana-Champaign. He was an all-Big Ten Conference selection in 1972 before being drafted in the fourth round by Minnesota. A three-sport star in high school, he was also selected by the San Diego Padres in the 1969 Major League Baseball draft, but did not sign and never played professional baseball.
