= Lou Tepper =

American football player and coach (born 1945)

Biographical details
- Born: September 7, 1945 (age 81)

Playing career
- 1965–1966: Rutgers
- Position: Defensive back

Coaching career (HC unless noted)
- 1967: Pittsburgh (GA)
- 1968–1970: New Hampshire (RB/LB)
- 1971: New Hampshire (DC)
- 1972–1975: William & Mary (DC)
- 1976–1977: William & Mary (AHC)
- 1978–1982: Virginia Tech (LB)
- 1983–1985: Colorado (DC/LB)
- 1986–1987: Colorado (AHC)
- 1988–1989: Illinois (DC)
- 1990–1991: Illinois (AHC/DC/ILB)
- 1991–1996: Illinois
- 1998–1999: LSU (DC/LB)
- 2000–2005: Edinboro
- 2006–2010: IUP
- 2012–2014: Buffalo (DC/LB)

Head coaching record
- Overall: 101–75–2
- Bowls: 1–2
- Tournaments: 2–3 (NCAA D-II playoffs)

Accomplishments and honors

Championships
- 4 PSAC Western Division (2003–2006)

Louis A. Tepper (born September 7, 1945) is an American former football coach. He served as the head football coach at the University of Illinois at Urbana-Champaign from 1991 to 1996, the Edinboro University of Pennsylvania, from 2000 to 2005, and Indiana University of Pennsylvania from 2006 to 2010, compiling a career college football coaching record of 101–75–2. Tepper was the defensive coordinator at Louisiana State University (LSU) from 1997 to 1999 and the University at Buffalo from 2012 to 2014.

== Playing career ==
Tepper played college football at Rutgers University. As a defensive back from 1965 to 1966, Tepper led the team in interceptions as a junior, and in tackles as a senior. Tepper graduated with a Bachelor of Science degree in physical education in 1967.

== Coaching career ==
Tepper was named the head coach at the University of Illinois in the 1991 season. Hired by John Mackovic as defensive coordinator in 1988, Tepper was promoted to head coach when Mackovic accepted the head coaching position at the University of Texas. Tepper's first game as head coach was the 1991 John Hancock Bowl, which the Illini lost to UCLA by the score of 6–3. Tepper served as the head coach at Illinois for five more seasons, compiling an overall record of 25–31–2, for a winning percentage of .446. The Illini went to the Holiday Bowl in 1992, losing to Hawaii by the score of 27–17, and the Liberty Bowl in 1994, beating East Carolina, 30–0, for Tepper's only bowl victory.

Tepper's defensive squads as coordinator were generally strong, and the Fighting Illini continued to field able 3–4 defenses with Tepper as head coach. Tepper's defensive players as head coach included Butkus Award winners Dana Howard and Kevin Hardy, as well as National Football League standouts Simeon Rice and John Holecek. Tepper authored a book, Complete Linebacking, to teach his style of defensive play for the linebacker position.

Tepper was the first Illinois coach since Robert Zuppke to win or tie both of his first two meetings against Michigan. The 1992 game, a 22–22 tie, ended Michigan's 19-game conference winning streak.

Tepper was involved in a series of controversial moves associated with the recruitment of blue-chip quarterback Chris Redman in 1994 and 1995. Redman stated that he had committed to Illinois based on the recruiting efforts of Illini offensive coordinator and former NFL Pro Bowl quarterback Greg Landry. Tepper ignited a controversy when he unexpectedly fired Landry the day after Redman signed his letter of commitment (LOC). Tepper denied any attempt to deceive Redman about Landry's future at Illinois and eventually released Redman from his commitment. It would later emerge that Landry had allegedly been soliciting an NFL job behind Tepper's back. The departures of Landry and Redman and the manner in which they left had damaged Tepper's reputation among fans and media. The NCAA decided to void the LOC based on the unusual circumstances, allowing Redman five full years of eligibility and no transfer restrictions. Tepper hired former Ball State head coach and veteran Big Ten assistant Paul Schudel as Landry's replacement. The hiring of Schudel marked the fourth time in six years that the Illini had made a change at offensive coordinator.

Despite Tepper's abilities as a defensive coach, he only put together only two winning seasons in his six years in Champaign. His teams were unable to match the moderate success the Illini had enjoyed under Mackovic and Mike White, and the Illini got progressively worse over his tenure. They placed fourth in the Big Ten Conference in Tepper's first full season, 1992, and finished in fourth, fifth, seventh, and ninth in his remaining years. Tepper was fired after the 1996 season, when the Illini went 2–9 with a 1–7 conference record. Tepper later said that he had forgiven Illinois for firing him.

Prior to coaching at Illinois, Tepper served as an assistant defensive coach at Pittsburgh (1967, graduate assistant), New Hampshire (1968–1971), William and Mary (1972–1977), Virginia Tech (1978–1982), and Colorado (1983–1987).

Tepper's contract at IUP was scheduled to expire in June 2011, however, in December 2010 the university announced he would depart effective at the end of the year.

In February 2011 he was named defensive coordinator of the United States national American football team for the 2011 IFAF World Cup.

From 2012-14, Tepper was named defensive coordinator and linebackers coach at Buffalo.

== Head coaching record ==
Year	Team	Overall	Conference	Standing	Bowl/playoffs
Illinois Fighting Illini (Big Ten Conference) (1991–1996)
1991	Illinois	0–1*	0–0*	5th*	L John Hancock
1992	Illinois	6–5–1	4–3–1	4th	L Holiday
1993	Illinois	5–6	5–3	T–4th	
1994	Illinois	7–5	4–4	T–5th	W Liberty
1995	Illinois	5–5–1	3–4–1	T–7th	
1996	Illinois	2–9	1–7	T–9th	
Illinois:		25–31–2	17–21–2	*John Mackovic coached the first 11 games of the season.	
Edinboro Fighting Scots (Pennsylvania State Athletic Conference) (2000–2005)
2000	Edinboro	5–6	2–4	T–4th (West)	
2001	Edinboro	4–6	3–3	T–3rd (West)	
2002	Edinboro	5–6	2–4	5th (West)	
2003	Edinboro	9–3	5–1	T–1st (West)	L NCAA Division II First Round
2004	Edinboro	9–3	5–1	T–1st (West)	L NCAA Division II Quarterfinal
2005	Edinboro	8–2	5–1	T–1st (West)	
Edinboro:		40–26	22–14		
IUP Crimson Hawks (Pennsylvania State Athletic Conference) (2006–2010)
2006	IUP	8–2	5–1	T–1st (West)	
2007	IUP	9–3	5–1	2nd (West)	L NCAA Division II Quarterfinal
2008	IUP	8–2	5–2	T–2nd (West)	
2009	IUP	5–6	1–6	7th (West)	
2010	IUP	6–5	3–4	T–4th (West)	
IUP:		36–18	19–14		
Total:		101–75–2			
