= John Mackovic =

American football player and coach (born 1943)

Biographical details
- Born: October 1, 1943 (age 83); Barberton, Ohio, U.S.

Playing career
- 1962–1964: Wake Forest

Coaching career (HC unless noted)
- 1965: Miami (OH) (GA)
- 1969–1970: San Jose State (assistant)
- 1973–1976: Arizona (OC)
- 1977: Purdue (AHC/OC)
- 1978–1980: Wake Forest
- 1981–1982: Dallas Cowboys (QB)
- 1983–1986: Kansas City Chiefs
- 1988–1991: Illinois
- 1992–1997: Texas
- 2001–2003: Arizona
- 2007: United States national team
- 2014–2023: Italy national team

Administrative career (AD unless noted)
- 1988–1991: Illinois

Head coaching record
- Overall: 95–82–3 (college); 30–34 (NFL); 4–0 (international play)
- Bowls: 2–6
- Tournaments: 4–0 (IFAF World Cup)

Accomplishments and honors

Championships
- Big Ten (1990); 2 SWC (1994–1995); Big 12 (1996); IFAF World Championship (2007); IFAF European Championship(2021); Big 12 South Division (1996)

Awards
- Sporting News College Football COY (1979); Walter Camp Coach of the Year Award (1979); ACC Coach of the Year (1979); 2× Big Ten Coach of the Year (1988–1989); SWC Coach of the Year (1995); Second-team All-ACC (1964)

John Mackovic (born October 1, 1943) is an American football coach. He was most recently the head coach of the Italy national American football team from 2014 to 2023, which was formed to compete in the EFAF European Championship. Previously, Mackovic served as the head football coach at Wake Forest University (1978–1980), the University of Illinois at Urbana–Champaign (1988–1991), the University of Texas at Austin (1992–1997), and the University of Arizona (2001–2003), compiling a career college football record of 95–82–3. He was also the head coach of the National Football League's Kansas City Chiefs from 1983 to 1986, tallying a mark of 30–34.

== Coaching career ==
Mackovic's coaching career began at Miami University in Ohio as a graduate assistant in 1965. He then served stints as offensive coordinator at San Jose State University and the University of Arizona before serving as offensive coordinator and assistant head coach at Purdue University in 1977.

Mackovic earned his first head coaching job in college football, taking over at Wake Forest from 1978 to 1980. Prior to his arrival, the Demon Deacons went 1–10; Mackovic led his teams to a 14–20 record, including their first bowl game in 30 years. In 1979, he was named the Coach of the Year by the Walter Camp Football Foundation.

In 1981, Tom Landry hired Mackovic as assistant head coach and quarterback coach with the Dallas Cowboys, with whom he spent two seasons before accepting a head coaching job with the Kansas City Chiefs in 1983. Mackovic would later name himself his offensive coordinator, a position he held all four seasons with the Chiefs. Mackovic's first three Chiefs teams missed the playoffs. In his final season, the Chiefs made the playoffs as a wild card, their first playoff appearance in 15 years and only their second since the AFL–NFL merger. However, owner Lamar Hunt fired Mackovic only days after they were eliminated in the first round due to a lack of chemistry. He had a year remaining on his contract and he had been offered an extension prior to the firing. This came in the wake of departures of defensive coordinator Walt Corey leaving for Buffalo and special team coach Frank Gansz resigning to look for a job as offensive coordinator. The catalyst behind Mackovic's dismissal was a meeting between Hunt and eight of the most prominent Chiefs. Days later, Gansz was hired to replace Mackovic. Mackovic's record with the Chiefs was 30–34.

Following a year off, Mackovic resumed his coaching career when he was hired as the head football coach and athletic director at the University of Illinois at Urbana–Champaign in 1988 to succeed Mike White, who had been hired over Mackovic in 1979; White resigned in the wake of recruiting violations. Other candidates before Mackovic was hired had included defensive coordinator Howard Tippett, Dennis Green and Jack Bicknell. Mackovic took over a team that went 3–7–1 before his arrival, but whom Mackovic led to a 30–16–1, four straight bowl appearances, and a share of the 1990 Big Ten Conference title.

Mackovic's previous success of turning around college programs led him to the University of Texas in 1992. Texas had gone from a Southwest Conference title in 1990 to a 5–6 record in 1991. Mackovic won a share of the Southwest Conference title in 1994 and won it outright in 1995. He also won the inaugural Big 12 Championship Game in 1996. A year later, however, the Longhorns were pounded 66–3 by UCLA, the worst home loss in school history (and the second-worst loss overall). The defeat is known to this day as "Rout 66". They never recovered and finished 4–7. Mackovic was fired after the season. During his tenure, Mackovic led the Longhorns to a 41–28–2 record and three bowl games.

Following his firing at Texas, Mackovic became a college football analyst for ESPN in 1998 for whom he worked until January 2001, when he accepted the head coaching job for the University of Arizona. Frustrated by an offense that was perceived as too conservative, Arizona hired Mackovic as head coach to replace Dick Tomey, who had resigned; however, Mackovic never posted a winning record in two and one-half seasons in Tucson, with a 10–18 record (a .357 winning percentage).

Mackovic's tenure at Arizona was mired in turmoil and a tumultuous relationship with his players. Midway through the 2002 season, he was embroiled in controversy after told tight end Justin Levasseur that he was a disgrace to his family. This incident, along with multiple others, led 40 players (including future Pro Bowler Lance Briggs) to hold a secret meeting with school president Peter Likins. The players complained about Mackovic's constant verbal abuse, such as an ugly tirade after a loss to Wisconsin. Mackovic offered a public apology to his players, the university and fans. However, whatever goodwill that he'd managed to restore quickly evaporated a season later; quarterback Nic Costa said that despite a very talented roster, many players had lost their love for the game due to Mackovic's brusque manner. Five games into the 2003 season, Mackovic was fired and replaced by defensive coordinator Mike Hankwitz. School officials said they had to act because it was obvious the Wildcats would not win with Mackovic at the helm.

In 2006, Mackovic again returned to coaching when he was named as the head coach of the U.S. national team. He led Team USA to win the 2007 IFAF World Cup in their first appearance in the American Football World Cup held in Kawasaki, Japan.

In 2014 he took over as head coach of the Italy national American football team and led them to the 2021 IFAF European Championship. He left the position in 2023.

== Head coaching record ==
=== College ===
Year	Team	Overall	Conference	Standing	Bowl/playoffs	Coaches^{#}	AP^{°}
Wake Forest Demon Deacons (Atlantic Coast Conference) (1978–1980)
1978	Wake Forest	1–10	1–5	6th			
1979	Wake Forest	8–4	3–2	4th	L Tangerine		
1980	Wake Forest	5–6	2–4	T–4th			
Wake Forest:		14–20	6–11				
Illinois Fighting Illini (Big Ten Conference) (1988–1991)
1988	Illinois	6–5–1	5–2–1	T–3rd	L All-American		
1989	Illinois	10–2	7–1	2nd	W Florida Citrus	10	10
1990	Illinois	8–4	6–2	T–1st	L Hall of Fame	24	25
1991	Illinois	6–5*	4–4	5th	John Hancock*		
Illinois:		30–16–1	22–9–1	*John Hancock Bowl coached by Lou Tepper			
Texas Longhorns (Southwest Conference) (1992–1995)
1992	Texas	6–5	4–3	T–2nd			
1993	Texas	5–5–1	5–2	T–2nd			
1994	Texas	8–4	4–3	T–1st	W Sun^{†}	23	25
1995	Texas	10–2–1	7–0	1st	L Sugar^{†}	14	14
Texas Longhorns (Big 12 Conference) (1996–1997)
1996	Texas	8–5	6–2	1st (South)	L Fiesta^{†}	23	23
1997	Texas	4–7	2–6	T–4th (South)			
Texas:		41–28–2	28–16				
Arizona Wildcats (Pacific-10 Conference) (2001–2003)
2001	Arizona	5–6	2–6	8th			
2002	Arizona	4–8	1–7	T–9th			
2003	Arizona	1–4**	0–1**				
Arizona:		10–18	3–14	**Fired after 5 games			
Total:		95–82–3					
National championship Conference title Conference division title or championship game berth
^{†}Indicates Bowl Coalition or Bowl Alliance bowl.; ^{#}Rankings from final Coaches Poll.; ^{°}Rankings from final AP Poll.

=== NFL ===
Team	Year	Regular Season					Postseason			
Team	Year	Won	Lost	Ties	Win %	Finish	Won	Lost	Win %	Result
KC	1983	6	10	0	.375	5th in AFC West	–	–	–	–
KC	1984	8	8	0	.500	4th in AFC West	–	–	–	–
KC	1985	6	10	0	.375	5th in AFC West	–	–	–	–
KC	1986	10	6	0	.625	2nd in AFC West	0	1	.000	Lost to New York Jets in AFC wild card game.
KC Total		30	34	0	.469		0	1	.000	
Total		30	34	0	.469		0	1	.000	
