= 1991 Minnesota Golden Gophers football team =

American college football season

1991 Minnesota Golden Gophers football
- Conference: Big Ten Conference
- Record: 2–9 (1–7 Big Ten)
- Head coach: John Gutekunst (6th season)
- Defensive coordinator: Tom Gadd (2nd season)
- Captains: Patt Evans; Sean Lumpkin
- Home stadium: Hubert H. Humphrey Metrodome

1991 Big Ten Conference football standings
	Conf.					Overall
Team	W		L		T	W		L		T
No. 6 Michigan $	8	–	0	–	0	10	–	2	–	0
No. 10 Iowa	7	–	1	–	0	10	–	1	–	1
Ohio State	5	–	3	–	0	8	–	4	–	0
Indiana	5	–	3	–	0	7	–	4	–	1
Illinois	4	–	4	–	0	6	–	6	–	0
Purdue	3	–	5	–	0	4	–	7	–	0
Michigan State	3	–	5	–	0	3	–	8	–	0
Wisconsin	2	–	6	–	0	5	–	6	–	0
Northwestern	2	–	6	–	0	3	–	8	–	0
Minnesota	1	–	7	–	0	2	–	9	–	0
$ – Conference champion; Rankings from AP Poll

The 1991 Minnesota Golden Gophers football team represented the University of Minnesota in the 1991 NCAA Division I-A football season. In their sixth year under head coach John Gutekunst, the Golden Gophers compiled a 2–9 record and were outscored by their opponents by a combined total of 302 to 104.

Offensive linemen Chip Brixius, defensive back Chris Cohen, wide receiver Omar Douglas, linebacker Dan LiSanti, running back Ken McClintock, defensive back Jeff Rosga and linebacker Lance Wolkow were named Academic All-Big Ten.

Defensive back Sean Lumpkin was awarded the Bronko Nagurski Award and Carl Eller Award. Tight end Patt Evans was awarded the Bruce Smith Award. Ken McClintock was awarded the Bobby Bell Award. Linebacker Joel Staats was awarded the Butch Nash Award. Quarterback Scott Schaffner was awarded the Paul Giel Award.

Total attendance for the season was 218,219, which averaged out to 36,369 per game. The season high for attendance was against the San José State.

== Schedule ==
Date	Time	Opponent	Site	TV	Result	Attendance	Source
September 14	7:00 pm	San José State*	Hubert H. Humphrey Metrodome; Minneapolis, MN		W 26–20	47,914	
September 21	1:00 pm	at No. 19 Colorado*	Folsom Field; Boulder, CO	KCNC	L 0–58	42,147	
September 28	2:30 pm	No. 18 Pittsburgh*	Hubert H. Humphrey Metrodome; Minneapolis, MN	ABC	L 13–14	39,511	
October 5	11:30 am	at No. 22 Illinois	Memorial Stadium; Champaign, IL	ESPN	L 3–24	57,981	
October 12	1:30 pm	Purdue^{†}	Hubert H. Humphrey Metrodome; Minneapolis, MN		W 6–3	31,939	
October 19	12:00 pm	at Michigan State	Spartan Stadium; East Lansing, MI		L 12–20	75,097	
October 25	7:00 pm	No. 4 Michigan	Hubert H. Humphrey Metrodome; Minneapolis, MN (Little Brown Jug)		L 6–52	32,577	
November 2	12:00 pm	at Indiana	Memorial Stadium; Bloomington, IN		L 8–34	44,095	
November 9	11:30 am	No. 19 Ohio State	Hubert H. Humphrey Metrodome; Minneapolis, MN	ESPN	L 6–35	30,145	
November 16	1:30 pm	Wisconsin	Hubert H. Humphrey Metrodome; Minneapolis, MN (rivalry)		L 16–19	36,133	
November 23	1:05 pm	at No. 9 Iowa	Kinnick Stadium; Iowa City, IA (rivalry)		L 8–23	32,500	
*Non-conference game; ^{†}Homecoming; Rankings from AP Poll released prior to the game; All times are in Central time

== Roster ==
1991 Minnesota Golden Gophers football team roster
Players
Coaches
Offense

Pos.	#	Name	Class
RB	39	Antonio Carter	So
WR	80	Omar Douglas	So
QB	14	Marquel Fleetwood (C)	Jr
WR	46	John Lewis	Jr

Defense

Pos.	#	Name	Class
LB	50	Gavin Barfknecht	Fr
DT	90	Ed Hawthorne	Fr

Special teams

Pos.	#	Name	Class

Head coach

- John Gutekunst

Coordinators/assistant coaches

Legend

- (C) Team captain
- (S) Suspended
- (I) Ineligible
- Injured
- Redshirt

Roster
