= 1991 Hall of Fame Bowl =

- 5th Hall of Fame Bowl
Clemson Tigers	Illinois Fighting Illini
(9–2)	(8–3)
ACC	Big Ten
30	0
Head coach: Ken Hatfield	Head coach: John Mackovic
AP / Coaches; 14 / 11	AP / Coaches; 16 / 17
	1	2	3	4	Total
Clemson	10	14	3	3	30
Illinois	0	0	0	0	0
- Date: January 1, 1991
- Season: 1990
- Stadium: Tampa Stadium
- Location: Tampa, Florida
- MVP: DeChane Cameron (Clemson QB)
- Referee: John Soffey (CIFOA)

United States TV coverage
- Network: NBC
- Announcers: Joel Meyers, Ahmad Rashad, Paul Maguire

The 1991 Hall of Fame Bowl featured the fourteenth-ranked Clemson Tigers and the sixteenth-ranked Illinois Fighting Illini. It was the fifth edition of the Hall of Fame Bowl.

Clemson's Chris Gardocki kicked an 18-yard field goal as the Tigers built a 3–0 lead. They led 10–0 after DeChane Cameron threw a 14-yard touchdown pass to Doug Thomas. In the second quarter, Clemson got another touchdown pass from Cameron, and a 34-yard interception return from Arlington Nunn giving Clemson a 24–0 halftime lead. Gardocki kicked field goals of 26 and 43 yards in the third and fourth quarter, respectively, as Clemson pulled away for a 30–0 victory.
