= 1990 Florida Citrus Bowl =

American college football game

1990 Florida Citrus Growers Association Florida Citrus Bowl
| Illinois Fighting Illini | Virginia Cavaliers |
| (9–2) | (10–2) |
| Big Ten | ACC |
| 31 | 21 |
| Head coach: John Mackovic | Head coach: George Welsh |
| AP / Coaches; 11 / 11 | AP / Coaches; 15 / 14 |
| | 1 | 2 | 3 | 4 | Total |
|---|---|---|---|---|---|
| Illinois | 7 | 10 | 7 | 7 | 31 |
| Virginia | 0 | 7 | 7 | 7 | 21 |
- Date: January 1, 1990
- Season: 1989
- Stadium: Florida Citrus Bowl
- Location: Orlando, Florida
- MVP: QB Jeff George, Illinois
- Referee: Loyd Dale (Southern Independent)
- Attendance: 60,016

United States TV coverage
- Network: ABC
- Announcers: Gary Bender and Dick Vermeil

The 1990 Florida Citrus Bowl was a post-season American college football bowl game at the Florida Citrus Bowl stadium in Orlando, Florida between the University of Illinois Fighting Illini and the Virginia Cavaliers on January 1, 1990. The game was the final contest of the 1989 NCAA Division I-A football season for both teams, and ended in a 31–21 victory for Illinois.

== Game summary ==
Illinois snapped a 26-year bowl victory drought with a 31–21 win over Virginia in the Florida Citrus Bowl. Illinois jumped on the Cavaliers early, with linebacker Bill Henkel recovering a fumble on the opening kickoff. Five plays later, quarterback Jeff George drilled a 15-yard scoring strike to Steven Williams. After Virginia tied the game early in the second quarter, George directed Illinois on an 80-yard scoring drive. Illinois opened the second half with an 84-yard drive capped by fullback Howard Griffith's three-yard touchdown. Early in the fourth quarter, receiver Mike Bellamy scored on a 26-yard pass from George to clinch an Illini victory. George earned MVP honors, completing 26-of-38 for 321 yards and three TDs.

== Scoring summary ==
| Quarter | Team | Scoring summary | Score | |
| Quarter | Team | Scoring summary | Illinois | Virginia |
|---|---|---|---|---|
| 1 | Illinois | Steven Williams 15-yard touchdown reception from Jeff George, Doug Higgins kick good | 7 | 0 |
| 2 | Virginia | Tim Finkelston 30-yard touchdown reception from Shawn Moore, Jake McInerney kick good | 7 | 7 |
| 2 | Illinois | Dan Donovan 1-yard touchdown reception from Jeff George, Doug Higgins kick good | 14 | 7 |
| 2 | Illinois | 34-yard field goal by Doug Higgins | 17 | 7 |
| 3 | Illinois | 3-yard touchdown run by Howard Griffith, Doug Higgins kick good | 24 | 7 |
| 3 | Virginia | 2-yard touchdown run by Marcus Wilson, Jake McInerney kick good | 24 | 14 |
| 4 | Illinois | Mike Bellamy 24-yard touchdown reception from Jeff George, Doug Higgins kick good | 31 | 14 |
| 4 | Virginia | Herman Moore 4-yard touchdown reception from Shawn Moore, Jake McInerney kick good | 31 | 21 |
| | | | 31 | 21 |

== Statistical summary ==
Team Statistics

(Rushing-Passing-Total): UI – 176-321-497; UV – 110-112-322.

Individual Statistical Leaders

Rushing (Att.-Yds.-TD): UI – Griffith 18-93-0, Steve Feagin 10-54-0; UV – Terry Kirby 8-64-0.

Passing (Att.-Comp.-Int.-TD-Yds.): UI – George 38-26-1-3-321; UV – S. Moore 27-17-2-2-191.

Receiving (No.-Yds.-TD): UI – Bellamy 8-166-1, Williams 4-45-1; UV – Finkelston 3-69-1, Herman Moore 5-56-1.
