= 1991 John Hancock Bowl =

American college football game

- 58th Sun Bowl
Illinois Fighting Illini	UCLA Bruins
(6–5)	(8–3)
Big Ten	Pac-10
3	6
Head coach: Lou Tepper	Head coach: Terry Donahue
	AP / Coaches; 22 / 23
	1	2	3	4	Total
Illinois	0	3	0	0	3
UCLA	3	0	0	3	6
- Date: December 31, 1991
- Season: 1991
- Stadium: Sun Bowl
- Location: El Paso, Texas
- MVP: LB Arnold Ale, UCLA
- Referee: Jim Knight (ACC)
- Attendance: 42,281

United States TV coverage
- Network: CBS
- Announcers: Brad Nessler (Play by Play); Randy Cross (Color); Mike Joy (Sideline)

The 1991 John Hancock Bowl was a college football bowl game played at the Sun Bowl in El Paso, Texas between the University of Illinois Fighting Illini and the University of California, Los Angeles on December 31, 1991. The game was the final contest of the 1991 NCAA Division I-A football season for both teams, and ended in a 6–3 victory for UCLA. Illinois and UCLA previously met in post-season at the 1984 Rose Bowl, in which UCLA upset #4 Illinois, 45–9.

== Game summary ==
The Illini were playing their first game under new head coach Lou Tepper, who was named John Mackovic's replacement a little more than two weeks earlier when Mackovic took the head coaching job at Texas. The Illinois defense certainly came to play, holding the high-octane UCLA attack to just 268 yards of total offense. The Fighting Illini offense didn't fare much better, though, totaling 308 yards of its own in a classic defensive struggle. Illinois missed an early scoring opportunity when Jason Verduzco's pass was intercepted at the Bruin goal line. The Illinois defense forced a UCLA fumble six plays later, but then promptly turned the ball back to the Bruins at the UI 24-yard line after a blocked punt. The Illinois defense stiffened and held UCLA to a field goal. Both teams traded punches until Illinois freshman Chris Richardson kicked a 27-yard field goal. The score remained tied until the opening drive of the fourth quarter when Illinois' Filmel Johnson fumbled a UCLA punt at the UI 11-yard line that lead to a 19-yard Louis Perez field goal. Illinois linebacker Mike Poloskey earned the Jimmy Rogers Jr. Trophy as the game's Most Valuable Lineman.

== Scoring summary ==
Quarter	Team	Scoring summary	Score	
Quarter	Team	Scoring summary	Illinois	UCLA
1	UCLA	32-yard field goal by Louis Perez	0	3
2	Illinois	27-yard field goal by Chris Richardson	3	3
4	UCLA	19-yard field goal by Louis Perez	3	6
			3	6

== Statistical summary ==
Team statistics

(Rushing-Passing-Total): UI - 119-189-308; UCLA - 92-176-268.

Individual statistical leaders

Rushing (Att.-Yds.-TD): UI - Steve Feagin 12-71-0; UCLA - Kevin Williams 24-52-0.

Passing (Att.-Comp.-Int.-TD-Yds.): UI - Jason Verduzco 38-17-3-0-189; UCLA - Tommy Maddox 28-17-1-0-176.

Receiving (No.-Yds.-TD): UI - John Wright 9-94-0; UCLA - Sean LaChapelle 5-69-0, Ricky Davis 4-41-0.

== Aftermath ==
- Terry Donahue went on to be a broadcast analyst for CBS for the Sun Bowl. He was inducted into the Sun Bowl Legends at the 2005 Sun Bowl along with Verne Lundquist.
