= Jason Verduzco =

American gridiron football player (born 1970)

Profile
- Position: Quarterback

Personal information
- Born: April 3, 1970 (age 56); Walnut Creek, California, U.S.
- Listed height: 5 ft 9 in (1.75 m)

Career information
- High school: Antioch (CA)
- College: Illinois

Career history

Playing
- 1993: BC Lions

Coaching
- 1994–1996: Hamilton Continentals (Asst)
- 1997–1999: Illinois Fighting Illini (Asst)
- 2000: Washington Redskins (Asst)
- 2001–2003: Kansas City Chiefs (Asst)
- 2004: Kansas City Chiefs (QB)
- 2005: Kansas City Chiefs (TE)

Awards and highlights
- 2× Second-team All-Big Ten (1990, 1992)

Jason A. Verduzco (born April 3, 1970) is an American former professional football quarterback who played one season with the BC Lions of the Canadian Football League (CFL). He played college football at the University of Illinois at Urbana–Champaign.

== Early life ==
Verduzco played high school football at Antioch High School in Antioch, California. He threw for career totals of 4,107 yards and 29 passing touchdowns. He also participated in wrestling for the Panthers, winning the state championship and earning ASICS Tiger All-America first team honors his senior year in 1988. Verduzco was inducted into the Antioch Sports Legends Hall of Fame in 2011.

== College career ==
Verduzco played for the Illinois Fighting Illini of the University of Illinois at Urbana–Champaign from 1989 to 1992. He was named an honorable mention All-American in 1992. He was also a two-time All-Big Ten selection. Verduzco recorded 7,532 yards on 42 passing touchdowns in his college career.

== Professional career ==
Verduzco played for the BC Lions in 1993.

== Coaching career ==
Verduzco was named an assistant coach for the Hamilton Continentals of Hamilton College in August 1994. He coached quarterbacks, kickers and served as recruiting coordinator for the Continentals from 1994 to 1996.

He was an assistant coach for the Illinois Fighting Illini from 1997 to 1999.

He served as defensive assistant for the Washington Redskins in 2000. He was an assistant coach for the Kansas City Chiefs from 2001 to 2005. He served as offensive assistant-quality control from 2001 to 2002, offensive assistant in 2003, quarterbacks coach in 2004 and tight ends coach in 2005.

== Personal life ==
Verduzco was involved in an altercation with police on October 2, 2005, before the Chiefs' game against the Philadelphia Eagles. He was maced by police after becoming combative due to not being allowed to turn into a stadium entrance that he normally used. He was sentenced to two-years' probation on February 2, 2006.
