= 1991 Ohio State Buckeyes football team =

American college football season

1991 Ohio State Buckeyes football

Hall of Fame Bowl, L 17–24 vs. Syracuse
- Conference: Big Ten Conference
- Record: 8–4 (5–3 Big Ten)
- Head coach: John Cooper (4th season)
- Offensive coordinator: Elliot Uzelac (1st season)
- Offensive scheme: Singleback
- Defensive coordinator: Bill Young (4th season)
- Base defense: 3–4
- MVP: Carlos Snow
- Captains: Carlos Snow; Scottie Graham; John Kacherski
- Home stadium: Ohio Stadium

1991 Big Ten Conference football standings
	Conf.					Overall
Team	W		L		T	W		L		T
No. 6 Michigan $	8	–	0	–	0	10	–	2	–	0
No. 10 Iowa	7	–	1	–	0	10	–	1	–	1
Ohio State	5	–	3	–	0	8	–	4	–	0
Indiana	5	–	3	–	0	7	–	4	–	1
Illinois	4	–	4	–	0	6	–	6	–	0
Purdue	3	–	5	–	0	4	–	7	–	0
Michigan State	3	–	5	–	0	3	–	8	–	0
Wisconsin	2	–	6	–	0	5	–	6	–	0
Northwestern	2	–	6	–	0	3	–	8	–	0
Minnesota	1	–	7	–	0	2	–	9	–	0
$ – Conference champion; Rankings from AP Poll

The 1991 Ohio State Buckeyes football team was an American football team that represented the Ohio State University as a member of the Big Ten Conference during the 1991 NCAA Division I-A football season. In their fourth year under head coach John Cooper, the Buckeyes compiled an 8–4 record (5–3 in conference games), tied for third place in the Big Ten, and outscored opponents by a total of 260 to 163. Against ranked opponents, they lost to No. 20 Illinois, No. 11 Iowa, and No. 4 Michigan. They concluded the season with a loss to No. 16 Syracuse in the 1992 Hall of Fame Bowl. The Buckeyes were not ranked in the final AP poll.

The Buckeyes gained an average of 210.2 rushing yards and 115.3 passing yards per game. On defense, they held opponents to 104.2 rushing yards and 192.1 passing yards per game. The team's statistical leaders included quarterback Kent Graham (1,018 passing yards, 51.6% completion percentage), running back Carlos Snow (772 rushing yards, 4.9 yards per carry), and wide receivers Bernard Edwards and Brian Stablein (25 receptions each for 364 and 363 yards, respectively). Linebacker Steve Tovar was selected by the American Football Coaches Association (AFCA) on the 1991 All-America team. Tovar, Snow, tackle Alan Kline, and defensive linemen Jason Simmons and Alonzo Spellman received first-team honors on the 1991 All-Big Ten Conference football team.

The team played its home games at Ohio Stadium in Columbus, Ohio. Ohio State's game against Northwestern was played at Cleveland Stadium in Cleveland.

== Schedule ==
Date	Time	Opponent	Rank	Site	TV	Result	Attendance	Source
September 7	3:30 p.m.	Arizona*	No. 22	Ohio Stadium; Columbus, OH	ABC	W 38–14	92,743	
September 14	12:30 p.m.	Louisville*	No. 19	Ohio Stadium; Columbus, OH	ESPN	W 23–15	91,734	
September 21	1:30 p.m.	Washington State*	No. 16	Ohio Stadium; Columbus, OH		W 33–19	92,687	
October 5	12:30 p.m.	Wisconsin	No. 14	Ohio Stadium; Columbus, OH		W 31–16	94,221	
October 12	3:30 p.m.	at No. 20 Illinois	No. 11	Memorial Stadium; Champaign, IL (Illibuck)	ABC	L 7–10	70,125	
October 19	1:05 p.m.	vs. Northwestern	No. 18	Cleveland Stadium; Cleveland, OH		W 34–3	73,830	
October 26	3:30 p.m.	Michigan State	No. 14	Ohio Stadium; Columbus, OH	ABC	W 27–17	94,341	
November 2	3:30 p.m.	No. 11 Iowa	No. 13	Ohio Stadium; Columbus, OH	ABC	L 9–16	95,357	
November 9	12:30 p.m.	at Minnesota	No. 19	Hubert H. Humphrey Metrodome; Minneapolis, MN	ESPN	W 35–6	30,145	
November 16	12:30 p.m.	Indiana	No. 19	Ohio Stadium; Columbus, OH	ESPN	W 20–16	93,417	
November 23	12:00 p.m.	at No. 4 Michigan	No. 18	Michigan Stadium; Ann Arbor, MI (rivalry)	ABC	L 3–31	106,156	
January 1, 1992	1:00 p.m.	vs. No. 16 Syracuse*	No. 25	Tampa Stadium; Tampa, FL (Hall of Fame Bowl)	NBC	L 17–24	57,789	
*Non-conference game; Rankings from AP Poll released prior to the game; All times are in Eastern time; Source:

== Game summaries ==
=== Iowa ===
Iowa at Ohio State

Team	1	2	3	4	Total
• No. 11 Hawkeyes	0	13	3	0	16
No. 13 Buckeyes	0	9	0	0	9

- Date: November 2
- Location: Ohio Stadium, Columbus, Ohio
- Game start: 3:30 PM EST
- Game attendance: 95,357
- TV announcers (ABC): Brent Musburger and Dick Vermeil

Scoring summary
2		IOWA	Rodgers 1-yard run (Skillett kick)	IOWA 7–0
2		OSU	Carlos Snow 2-yard run (kick)	Tied 7–7
2		IOWA	Alan Cross 61-yard pass from Rodgers (kick blocked)	IOWA 13-7
2		OSU	Simmons 85-yard blocked PAT return	IOWA 13-9
3	0:27	IOWA	Skillett 30-yard field goal	IOWA 16–9

== Personnel ==
=== Coaching staff ===
- John Cooper, head coach (4th year)
- Bobby April, defensive backs (1st year)
- Larry Coyer, defensive Babas (3rd year)
- Joe Hollis, offensive line (1st year)
- Ron Hudson, quarterbacks (4th year)
- Gene Huey, wide receivers (4th year)
- Bob Palcic, offensive line (6th year)
- Fred Pagac, linebackers (10th year)
- Elliot Uzelac, offensive coordinator (1st year)
- Bill Young, defensive coordinator (4th year)

=== Roster ===
1991 Ohio State Buckeyes football team roster
Players
Coaches
Offense

Pos.	#	Name	Class
RB	33	Butler By'not'e	So
WR	1	DeWayne Carter	Fr
WR	83	Allen DeGraffenreid	Jr
QB	11	Kent Graham	Sr
RB	34	Raymont Harris	So
QB	4	Kirk Herbstreit	Jr
OT	67	Alan Kline	So
RB	5	Dante Lee	Jr
C	66	Paul Long	Jr
WR	17	Chris Sanders	So
TE	85	Cedric Saunders	So
C	59	Rod Smith	So
WR	88	Brian Stablein	Jr
RB	26	Robert Smith	So

Defense

Pos.	#	Name	Class
SS	24	Roger Harper	Jr
LB	92	John Kacherski	Sr
FS	13	Chico Nelson	So
CB	9	Tito Paul	Fr
CB	22	Foster Paulk	Jr
LB	12	Brad Pope	Jr
LB	84	Craig Powell	Fr
DE	99	Alonzo Spellman	Jr
LB	58	Steve Tovar	Jr
LB	37	James Ehling	So
DT	72	Dan Wilkinson	Fr
LB	51	Mark Williams	So

Special teams

Pos.	#	Name	Class
K	23	Tim Williams	So

Head coach

- John Cooper

Coordinators/assistant coaches

- Mike Dunlevy
  (Assistant)
- Gene Huey
  (Running backs)
- Joe Hollis
  (Offensive line)

Legend

- (C) Team captain
- (S) Suspended
- (I) Ineligible
- Injured
- Redshirt

Roster

== 1992 NFL draftees ==
Player	Round	Pick	Position	NFL club
Alonzo Spellman	1	22	Defensive end	Chicago Bears
Scottie Graham	7	188	Running Back	Pittsburgh Steelers
Kent Graham	8	211	Quarterback	New York Giants
