= 1991 Purdue Boilermakers football team =

American college football season

1991 Purdue Boilermakers football
- Conference: Big Ten Conference
- Record: 4–7 (3–5 Big Ten)
- Head coach: Jim Colletto (1st season)
- Offensive coordinator: Bobby Turner (1st season)
- Defensive coordinator: Moe Ankney (1st season)
- MVP: Jim Schwantz
- Captains: Bob Dressel; Frank Kmet; Rick Smith
- Home stadium: Ross–Ade Stadium

1991 Big Ten Conference football standings
	Conf.					Overall
Team	W		L		T	W		L		T
No. 6 Michigan $	8	–	0	–	0	10	–	2	–	0
No. 10 Iowa	7	–	1	–	0	10	–	1	–	1
Ohio State	5	–	3	–	0	8	–	4	–	0
Indiana	5	–	3	–	0	7	–	4	–	1
Illinois	4	–	4	–	0	6	–	6	–	0
Purdue	3	–	5	–	0	4	–	7	–	0
Michigan State	3	–	5	–	0	3	–	8	–	0
Wisconsin	2	–	6	–	0	5	–	6	–	0
Northwestern	2	–	6	–	0	3	–	8	–	0
Minnesota	1	–	7	–	0	2	–	9	–	0
$ – Conference champion; Rankings from AP Poll

The 1991 Purdue Boilermakers football team represented Purdue University as a member of the Big Ten Conference during the 1991 NCAA Division I-A football season. Led by first-year head coach Jim Colletto, the Boilermakers compiled an overall record of 4–7 with a mark of 3–5 in conference play, tying for sixth place the Big Ten. Purdue suffered its seventh consecutive losing season. The team played home games at Ross–Ade Stadium in West Lafayette, Indiana.

== Schedule ==
Date	Time	Opponent	Site	TV	Result	Attendance	Source
September 7	1:00 pm	Eastern Michigan*	Ross–Ade Stadium; West Lafayette, IN		W 49–3	37,911	
September 14	3:00 pm	at California*	California Memorial Stadium; Berkeley, CA		L 18–42	39,000	
September 28	1:00 pm	No. 8 Notre Dame*	Ross–Ade Stadium; West Lafayette, IN (rivalry)		L 20–45	67,861	
October 5	1:00 pm	at Northwestern	Dyche Stadium; Evanston, IL		W 17–14	26,814	
October 12	1:30 pm	at Minnesota	Hubert H. Humphrey Metrodome; Minneapolis, MN		L 3–6	31,939	
October 19	1:00 pm	Wisconsin^{†}	Ross–Ade Stadium; West Lafayette, IN		W 28–7	42,944	
October 26	4:00 pm	No. 11 Iowa	Ross–Ade Stadium; West Lafayette, IN	ESPN	L 21–31	32,932	
November 2	12:30 pm	at No. 2 Michigan	Michigan Stadium; Ann Arbor, MI	ESPN	L 0–42	105,401	
November 9	1:00 pm	Illinois	Ross–Ade Stadium; West Lafayette, IN (rivalry)		L 14–41	33,152	
November 16	1:00 pm	Michigan State	Ross–Ade Stadium; West Lafayette, IN		W 27–17	30,399	
November 23	1:00 pm	at Indiana	Memorial Stadium; Bloomington, IN (Old Oaken Bucket)	WTTV	L 22–24	51,596	
*Non-conference game; ^{†}Homecoming; Rankings from AP Poll released prior to the game; All times are in Eastern time; Source:

== Game summaries ==
=== Eastern Michigan ===
Eastern Michigan Eagles (0–0) at Purdue Boilermakers (0–0)

Quarter	1	2	3	4	Total
E. Michigan	0	3	0	0	3
Purdue	14	7	14	14	49

at Ross–Ade Stadium, West Lafayette, Indiana

- Date: September 7, 1991
- Game time: 1:00 p.m.
- Game attendance: 40,684
- Most points scored by Purdue since 1987 vs. Wisconsin
- Most rushing yards in a game since 1983 vs. Indiana
- Jim Colletto first Purdue coach to win first game since Alex Agase (1973)

External videos
- Full game

Team	Category	Player	Statistics
E. Michigan	Passing		
E. Michigan	Rushing		
E. Michigan	Receiving		
Purdue	Passing	Eric Hunter	4/11, 59 Yds
Purdue	Rushing	Arlee Connors	7 Rush, 68 Yds
Purdue	Receiving		

Scoring summary

Quarter	Time	Drive			Team	Scoring information	Score	
Quarter	Time	Plays	Yards	TOP	Team	Scoring information	EMU	PU
1	14:06				Purdue	Interception returned 66 yards for touchdown by Jim Schwantz, kick good	0	7
1	3:38	7	84		Purdue	Eric Hunter 27-yard touchdown run, kick good	0	14
2		7	35		Purdue	Earl Coleman 1-yard touchdown run, kick good	0	21
2					E. Michigan	43-yard field goal by Jim Langeloh	3	21
3	5:34	15	80		Purdue	Corey Rogers 1-yard touchdown run, kick good	3	28
3	4:17				Purdue	Eric Hunter 8-yard touchdown run, kick good	3	35
4					Purdue	Earl Coleman 2-yard touchdown run, kick good	3	42
4	5:36				Purdue	Luis Smikle 1-yard touchdown run, kick good	3	49
"TOP" = time of possession. For other American football terms, see Glossary of American football.							3	49

=== At Northwestern ===
External videos
- Full game

=== At Minnesota ===
- Jeff Hill 12 rushes, 110 yards

=== Illinois ===
- Corey Rogers 20 rushes, 146 yards

=== Indiana ===
- Jeff Hill 16 rushes, 116 yards

External videos
- 1991 Purdue at Indiana – TV broadcast

== Personnel ==
1991 Purdue Boilermakers football team roster
Players
Coaches
Offense

Pos.	#	Name	Class
FB	38	Mike Doctor	Sr
RB		Mike Anderson
OL		David Bratton
WR		Tedman Brown
OL		Elvin Caldwell
WR		Ernest Calloway
OL		Denny Chronopoulos
RB		Earl Coleman
FB		Arlee Connors	So
WR	21	Rodney Dennis	Jr
C		Bob Dressel (C)	Sr
RB		Rob Forester
TE		Scott Green
OL		Ryan Grigson
RB		Jeff Hill	So
QB	9	Eric Hunter	Jr
OL		Kevin Janiak
RB		Houston Malden
QB		George Ogorek
QB	11	Matt Pike
RB		Corey Rogers	Fr
WR		Jermaine Ross
OL		Derick Schmidt
TE		Tony Simmons
RB		Luis Smikle
WR		Burt Thornton

Defense

Pos.	#	Name	Class
DB		Tank Adams
LB		Eric Beatty
DL		James Cole
LB		Trent Decatur
LB		Don Delvy
DB		Ikee Dozier
DL		Eric Gray
DL		Robert Hardin
DB		Pat Johnson
DL		Frank Kmet (C)
LB		Nick Mamula
LB		Peyton Minter
LB	48	Jim Schwantz	Sr
DB		Rick Smith (C)
LB		Kevin Strickland
DB		Jimmy Young
DL		Jeff Zgonina

Special teams

Pos.	#	Name	Class
P	15	Eric Bruun
K		Joe O'Leary

Head coach

- Jim Colletto

Coordinators/assistant coaches

- Tim Salem
  (Quarterbacks)

Legend

- (C) Team captain
- (S) Suspended
- (I) Ineligible
- Injured
- Redshirt
