= 1991 Florida State Seminoles football team =

American college football season

1991 Florida State Seminoles football

Cotton Bowl Classic champion

Cotton Bowl Classic, W 10–2 vs. Texas A&M
- Conference: Independent

Ranking
- Coaches: No. 4
- AP: No. 4
- Record: 11–2
- Head coach: Bobby Bowden (16th season)
- Offensive coordinator: Brad Scott (2nd season)
- Offensive scheme: I formation, pro set
- Defensive coordinator: Mickey Andrews (8th season)
- Base defense: 4–3
- Captains: Kirk Carruthers; Errol McCorvey; Casey Weldon
- Home stadium: Doak Campbell Stadium

1991 NCAA Division I-A independents football records
	Conf.			Overall
Team	W	L	T	W		L		T
No. 9 East Carolina		–		11	–	1	–	0
No. 4 Florida State		–		11	–	2	–	0
No. 3 Penn State		–		11	–	2	–	0
No. 21 Tulsa		–		10	–	2	–	0
Louisiana Tech		–		8	–	1	–	2
No. 13 Notre Dame		–		10	–	3	–	0
Akron		–		5	–	6	–	0
Memphis State		–		5	–	6	–	0
Army		–		4	–	7	–	0
Cincinnati		–		4	–	7	–	0
Southern Miss		–		4	–	7	–	0
South Carolina		–		3	–	6	–	2
Southwestern Louisiana		–		2	–	8	–	1
Louisville		–		2	–	9	–	0
Northern Illinois		–		2	–	9	–	0
Tulane		–		1	–	10	–	0
Navy		–		1	–	10	–	0
Rankings from AP Poll

The 1991 Florida State Seminoles football team represented Florida State University as an independent during the 1891 NCAA Division I-A football season. Led by 16th-year head coach Bobby Bowden, the Seminoles compiled a record of 11–2 with win in the Cotton Bowl Classic over Texas A&M. Florida State played home games at Doak Campbell Stadium in Tallahassee, Florida.

Florida State finished the season ranked No. 4 in both polls. The Seminoles started the season ranked atop of the polls and stayed at No.1 until losing to the No. 2 Miami Hurricanes on November 16, in a game known as Wide Right I. The Seminoles offense scored 449 points while the defense allowed 188 points. Quarterback Casey Weldon was runner-up for the Heisman Trophy.

This was Florida State's final season as an independent as the Seminoles joined the Atlantic Coast Conference (ACC) in 1992.

== Schedule ==
Date	Time	Opponent	Rank	Site	TV	Result	Attendance	Source
August 29	9:00 p.m.	vs. No. 19 BYU	No. 1	Anaheim Stadium; Anaheim, CA (Pigskin Classic)	Raycom	W 44–28	38,363	
September 7	7:00 p.m.	Tulane	No. 1	Doak Campbell Stadium; Tallahassee, FL	PPV	W 38–11	61,801	
September 14	7:00 p.m.	Western Michigan	No. 1	Doak Campbell Stadium; Tallahassee, FL	PPV	W 58–0	60,913	
September 28	12:00 p.m.	at No. 3 Michigan	No. 1	Michigan Stadium; Ann Arbor, MI	ABC	W 51–31	106,145	
October 5	3:30 p.m.	No. 10 Syracuse	No. 1	Doak Campbell Stadium; Tallahassee, FL	ABC	W 46–14	61,231	
October 12	1:00 p.m.	vs. Virginia Tech	No. 1	Florida Citrus Bowl; Orlando, FL	BECTV	W 33–20	58,991	
October 19	2:00 p.m.	No. 7 (I-AA) Middle Tennessee	No. 1	Doak Campbell Stadium; Tallahassee, FL		W 39–10	60,202	
October 26	7:40 p.m.	at LSU	No. 1	Tiger Stadium; Baton Rouge, LA	ESPN	W 27–16	71,019	
November 2	8:00 p.m.	at Louisville	No. 1	Cardinal Stadium; Louisville, KY		W 40–15	34,270	
November 9	12:00 p.m.	South Carolina	No. 1	Doak Campbell Stadium; Tallahassee, FL	JPS	W 38–10	60,244	
November 16	12:00 p.m.	No. 2 Miami (FL)	No. 1	Doak Campbell Stadium; Tallahassee, FL (rivalry)	ABC	L 16–17	63,442	
November 30	12:00 p.m.	at No. 5 Florida	No. 3	Ben Hill Griffin Stadium; Gainesville, FL (rivalry)	ABC	L 9–14	85,461	
January 1	1:30 p.m.	vs. No. 9 Texas A&M	No. 5	Cotton Bowl; Dallas, TX (Cotton Bowl Classic)	CBS	W 10–2	73,728	
Rankings from AP Poll released prior to the game; All times are in Eastern time; Source:

== Rankings ==
Ranking movements Legend: ██ Increase in ranking ██ Decrease in ranking ( ) = First-place votes
	Week															
Poll	Pre	1	2	3	4	5	6	7	8	9	10	11	12	13	14	Final
AP	1 (49)	1 (54)	1 (53)	1 (47)	1 (48)	1 (56)	1 (58)	1 (56)	1 (56)	1 (53)	1 (53)	1 (53)	3	3	5	4
Coaches	1 (42)	1 (43)	1 (51)	1 (47)	1 (49)	1 (55)	1 (55)	1 (55)	1 (53)	1 (47)	1 (47)	1 (47)	4	4	6	4

== Game summaries ==
=== Michigan ===
#1 Florida State at #3 Michigan

Team	1	2	3	4	Total
• Seminoles	19	12	6	14	51
Wolverines	10	13	0	8	31

- Date: September 28
- Location: Michigan Stadium, Ann Arbor, MI
- Game attendance: 106,145
- TV announcers (ABC): Keith Jackson, Bob Griese, (sideline reporter) Jack Arute

=== Miami (FL) ===
#2 Miami (FL) at #1 Florida State

Team	1	2	3	4	Total
• Hurricanes	7	0	0	10	17
Seminoles	3	7	3	3	16

- Date: November 16
- Location: Doak Campbell Stadium, Tallahassee, FL
- Game start: 12:00 p.m. EST
- Game attendance: 63,442
- TV announcers (ABC): Keith Jackson and Bob Griese

Scoring summary
1		MIA	Stephen McGuire 2-yard run (Huerta kick)	MIA 7-0
1		FSU	Gerry Thomas 25-yard field goal	MIA 7-3
2		FSU	Paul Moore 1-yard run (Thomas kick)	FSU 10-7
3		FSU	Gerry Thomas 31-yard field goal	Tied 13-7
4		FSU	Gerry Thomas 20-yard field goal	FSU 16-7
4	9:48	MIA	Carlos Huerta 45-yard field goal	FSU 16-10
4	3:01	MIA	Larry Jones 1-yard run (Huerta kick)	MIA 17-16

=== At Florida ===
#3 Florida State Seminoles (10–1) at #5 Florida Gators (9–1)

Quarter	1	2	3	4	Total
Florida St	0	3	0	6	9
Florida	0	7	7	0	14

at Ben Hill Griffin Stadium, Gainesville, Florida

- Date: November 30
- Game attendance: 85,461
- TV announcers (ABC): Keith Jackson and Bob Griese
- Recap/Box

Game information

First quarter

- No scoring

Second quarter

- FSU – Gerry Thomas 19-yard field goal, 8:31. Florida St 3–0. Drive:
- UF – Errict Rhett 3-yard run (Arden Czyzewski kick), 3:11. Florida 7–3. Drive:

Third quarter

- UF – Harrison Houston 72-yard pass from Shane Matthews (Arden Czyzewski kick), 7:32. Florida 14–3. Drive:

Fourth quarter

- FSU – Amp Lee 25-yard pass from Casey Weldon (pass failed), 5:24. Florida 14–9. Drive:

Top passers

- FSU – Casey Weldon – 24/51, 305 yards, TD, INT
- UF – Shane Matthews – 13/30, 208 yards, TD, 3 INT

Top rushers

- FSU – Amp Lee – 9 rushes, 24 yards
- UF – Errict Rhett – 24 rushes, 109 yards, TD

Top receivers

- FSU – Kez McCorvey – 6 receptions, 89 yards
- UF – Harrison Houston – 2 receptions, 76 yards, TD

== Roster ==
1991 Florida State Seminoles football team roster
Players
Coaches
Offense

Pos.	#	Name	Class
RB		Clyde Allen
OL		Robbie Baker
WR		Shannon Baker
RB	22	Edgar Bennett	Sr
OL		Johnny Clower
G	73	Reggie Dixon	Sr
WR		'Omar Ellison
QB		Kenny Felder
OL		John Fiath
FB	44	William Floyd	So
WR	12	Matt Frier	So
OL	61	Eric Gibbs	Jr
RB		Felix Harris
TE		Warren Hart
RB	35	Sean Jackson	So
QB	14	Brad Johnson	Sr
TE		Lonnie Johnson
WR		Kevin Knox
RB	42	Amp Lee	Jr
OT	67	Kevin Mancini	Sr
WR	88	Kez McCorvey	Fr
OT	76	Eric McGill	Jr
RB		Tiger McMillon
OL	69	Patrick McNeill	Fr
RB		Paul Moore
G	60	Mike Morris	Sr
RB		Jason Peirce
RB		Marquette Smith
OL		Robert Stevenson
WR		Eric Turral
QB		Charlie Ward
QB	11	Casey Weldon	Sr

Defense

Pos.	#	Name	Class
DB		Clifton Abraham
LB		Kevin Adams
LB		Ken Alexander
LB		Derrick Brooks
DB	31	Lavon Brown	Jr
CB	27	Terrell Buckley	Jr
LB	46	Kirk Carruthers	So
DL		James Chaney
DB		John Davis
LB		Howard Dinkins
DL		Dan Footman
DB		Leon Fowler
LB	97	Reggie Freeman	Jr
LB	55	Marvin Jones	Fr
DB		Errol McCorvey
DL		Toddrick McIntosh
DL		Henry Ostaszewski
LB		Sterling Palmer
DB		Corey Sawyer
DL		Carl Simpson

Special teams

Pos.	#	Name	Class
K	9	Dan Mowrey	Fr
K	15	Gerry Thomas	So

Head coach

- Bobby Bowden

Coordinators/assistant coaches

- Chuck Amato (DL)
- Mickey Andrews (DC)
- Wally Burnham (LB)

Legend

- (C) Team captain
- (S) Suspended
- (I) Ineligible
- Injured
- Redshirt

== Awards and honors ==
- Terrell Buckley, Jim Thorpe Award
- Casey Weldon, Johnny Unitas Golden Arm Award

== Team players in the NFL ==
The following Seminoles were selected in the 1992 NFL draft after the season.

Round	Pick	Player	Position	NFL team
1	5	Terrell Buckley	Cornerback	Green Bay Packers
2	45	Amp Lee	Running back	San Francisco 49ers
3	73	Howard Dinkins	Linebacker	Atlanta Falcons
4	102	Casey Weldon	Quarterback	Philadelphia Eagles
4	103	Edgar Bennett	Running back	Green Bay Packers
9	227	Brad Johnson	Quarterback	Minnesota Vikings
