= 1991 Wisconsin Badgers football team =

American college football season

1991 Wisconsin Badgers football
- Conference: Big Ten Conference
- Record: 5–6 (2–6 Big Ten)
- Head coach: Barry Alvarez (2nd season)
- Offensive coordinator: Russ Jacques (2nd season)
- Offensive scheme: Multiple
- Defensive coordinator: Dan McCarney (2nd season)
- Base defense: 3–4
- MVP: Troy Vincent
- Captains: Chuck Belin; Tony Lowery; Brendan Lynch; Troy Vincent
- Home stadium: Camp Randall Stadium

1991 Big Ten Conference football standings
	Conf.					Overall
Team	W		L		T	W		L		T
No. 6 Michigan $	8	–	0	–	0	10	–	2	–	0
No. 10 Iowa	7	–	1	–	0	10	–	1	–	1
Ohio State	5	–	3	–	0	8	–	4	–	0
Indiana	5	–	3	–	0	7	–	4	–	1
Illinois	4	–	4	–	0	6	–	6	–	0
Purdue	3	–	5	–	0	4	–	7	–	0
Michigan State	3	–	5	–	0	3	–	8	–	0
Wisconsin	2	–	6	–	0	5	–	6	–	0
Northwestern	2	–	6	–	0	3	–	8	–	0
Minnesota	1	–	7	–	0	2	–	9	–	0
$ – Conference champion; Rankings from AP Poll

The 1991 Wisconsin Badgers football team represented the University of Wisconsin–Madison as a member of the Big Ten Conferenceduring the 1991 NCAA Division I-A football season. Led by second-year head coach Barry Alvarez, the Badgers compiled an overall record of 5–6 with a mark of 2–6 in conference play, tying for eighth place in the Big Ten. Wisconsin played home games at Camp Randall Stadium in Madison, Wisconsin.

== Schedule ==
Date	Time	Opponent	Site	Result	Attendance	Source
September 14	1:05 p.m.	Western Illinois*	Camp Randall Stadium; Madison, WI	W 31–13	42,861	
September 21	1:05 p.m.	Iowa State*	Camp Randall Stadium; Madison, WI	W 7–6	50,710	
September 28	1:05 p.m.	Eastern Michigan*	Camp Randall Stadium; Madison, WI	W 21–6	45,365	
October 5	12:30 p.m.	at No. 14 Ohio State	Ohio Stadium; Columbus, OH	L 16–31	94,221	
October 12	1:05 p.m.	Iowa	Camp Randall Stadium; Madison, WI (rivalry)	L 6–10	75,053	
October 19	1:00 p.m.	at Purdue	Ross–Ade Stadium; West Lafayette, IN	L 7–28	42,944	
October 26	1:05 p.m.	Indiana^{†}	Camp Randall Stadium; Madison, WI	L 20–28	54,052	
November 2	1:00 p.m.	at Illinois	Memorial Stadium; Champaign, IL	L 6–22	61,493	
November 9	1:05 p.m.	Michigan State	Camp Randall Stadium; Madison, WI	L 7–20	41,074	
November 16	1:30 p.m.	at Minnesota	Hubert H. Humphrey Metrodome; Minneapolis, MN (rivalry)	W 19–16	36,133	
November 23	1:05 p.m.	Northwestern	Camp Randall Stadium; Madison, WI	W 32–14	38,620	
*Non-conference game; ^{†}Homecoming; Rankings from AP Poll released prior to the game; All times are in Central time; Source:

== Roster ==
1991 Wisconsin Badgers football team roster
Players
Coaches
Offense

Pos.	#	Name	Class
OT	77	Tyler Adam	Jr
G	75	Chuck Belin (C)	Jr
TE	84	Jim Bourne	Jr
WR	19	Aaron Brown	Jr
WR	85	Tom Browne, Jr	Sr
G	65	Mike Bryan	Jr
RB	44	Jason Burns	Fr
WR	13	Lionell Crawford (injured)	Sr
TE	88	Dave Czech	So
WR	2	Lee DeRamus	Fr
RB	41	Terrell Fletcher	Fr
FB	34	Nikki Kemp	Fr
RB	8	Rory Lee	So
QB	14	Tony Lowery	Sr
QB	16	Jay Macias	Fr
OT	74	Bill Maksen	So
G	53	Pat McGettigan	Jr
FB	32	Mark Montgomery	So
RB	33	Brent Moss	So
C	58	Joe Panos	So
C	76	Jeff Rasmussen	Jr
C	52	Cory Raymer	Fr
TE	81	Michael Roan	Fr
RB	21	Rodney Shelton	Fr
QB	6	Jay Simala	So
WR	23	Tony Spaeth	Jr
OT	67	Mike Verstegen	Fr
WR	15	Tim Ware	Jr
RB	3	Robert Williams	Sr
FB	45	Jeff Wirth	So
WR	87	Vince Zullo	Fr

Defense

Pos.	#	Name	Class
CB	5	Jamel Brown	Fr
LB	98	Yusef Burgess	So
LB	51	Ed Premus	Fr
LB	57	Gary Casper	Jr
CB	7	Eddie Fletcher, Jr	Sr
DT	92	Carlos Fowler	So
LB	50	Chris Hein	Fr
S	10	Reggie Holt	So
DL	64	Jerry Huggett	Sr
NT	61	Lee Krueger	Jr
WR	4	Michael London	Fr
LB	42	Brendan Lynch	Sr
DT	70	Jason Maniecki	Fr
CB	24	Korey Manley	So
LB	95	Curt Maternowski	Jr
CB	29	Jeff Messenger	Jr
S	37	Scott Nelson	So
LB	48	Aaron Norvell	Jr
LB	54	Todd Orlando	So
LB	93	Nick Rafko	So
LB	86	Dwight Reese	Jr
S	25	Rafael Robinson	Sr
DB	49	Henry Searcy	So
NT	62	Lamark Shackerford	So
LB	36	Duer Sharp	Sr
DB	39	Todd Strop	Sr
DT	66	Mike Thompson	Fr
DL	96	Patrick Thompson	Jr
S	17	Mel Tucker	So
LB	47	Eric Unverzagt	Fr
CB	22	Troy Vincent (C)	Sr
LB	53	Chad Yocum	Fr

Special teams

Pos.	#	Name	Class
K	38	Matt Krueger	Fr
K	18	Rich Thompson	Jr
P	26	Sam Veit	Fr

Head coach

- Barry Alvarez

Coordinators/assistant coaches

- Russ Jacques – Offensive coordinator/quarterbacks
- Dan McCarney – Defensive coordinator/defensive line
- Bill Callahan – Offensive line
- Brad Childress – Running backs
- Kevin Cosgrove – Inside linebackers
- Paul Jette – Defensive backs
- John Palermo – Assistant Head Coach/outside linebackers
- Paul Winters – Tight ends
- Jay Norvell – Volunteer assistant/wide receivers
- Bernie Wyatt – Recruiting coordinator

Legend

- (C) Team captain
- (S) Suspended
- (I) Ineligible
- Injured
- Redshirt

== Regular starters ==
Position	Player
Quarterback	Tony Lowery
Tailback	Terrell Fletcher
Fullback	Mark Montgomery
Wide Receiver	Lee DeRamus/Tim Ware
Wide Receiver	Aaron Brown
Tight End	Michael Roan
Left Tackle	Mike Verstegen
Left Guard	Chuck Belin
Center	Joe Panos
Right Guard	Mike Bryan
Right Tackle	Tyler Adam

Position	Player
Defensive tackle	Mike Thompson
Nose Guard	Lee Krueger
Defensive tackle	Carlos Fowler
Outside Linebacker	Dwight Reese
Inside Linebacker	Brendan Lynch
Inside Linebacker	Gary Casper
Outside Linebacker	Duer Sharp
Cornerback	Troy Vincent
Strong Safety	Reggie Holt
Free Safety	Scott Nelson
Cornerback	Eddie Fletcher

== Team players in the 1992 NFL draft ==
Player	Position	Round	Pick	NFL club
Troy Vincent	Defensive Back	1	7	Miami Dolphins
