= Tony Lowery =

Tony Lowery may refer to:

- Tony Lowery (footballer)
- Tony Lowery (American football)
