= 1991 Indiana Hoosiers football team =

American college football season

1991 Indiana Hoosiers football

Copper Bowl champion

Copper Bowl, W 24–0 vs. Baylor
- Conference: Big Ten Conference
- Record: 7–4–1 (5–3 Big Ten)
- Head coach: Bill Mallory (8th season)
- Defensive coordinator: Joe Novak (8th season)
- MVP: Vaughn Dunbar
- Captains: Mark Hagen; Randy Schneider; Paul Williams
- Home stadium: Memorial Stadium

1991 Big Ten Conference football standings
	Conf.					Overall
Team	W		L		T	W		L		T
No. 6 Michigan $	8	–	0	–	0	10	–	2	–	0
No. 10 Iowa	7	–	1	–	0	10	–	1	–	1
Ohio State	5	–	3	–	0	8	–	4	–	0
Indiana	5	–	3	–	0	7	–	4	–	1
Illinois	4	–	4	–	0	6	–	6	–	0
Purdue	3	–	5	–	0	4	–	7	–	0
Michigan State	3	–	5	–	0	3	–	8	–	0
Wisconsin	2	–	6	–	0	5	–	6	–	0
Northwestern	2	–	6	–	0	3	–	8	–	0
Minnesota	1	–	7	–	0	2	–	9	–	0
$ – Conference champion; Rankings from AP Poll

The 1991 Indiana Hoosiers football team represented Indiana University Bloomington as a member of the Big Ten Conference during the 1991 NCAA Division I-A football season. Led by eighth-year head coach Bill Mallory, the Hoosiers compiled an overall record of 7–4–1 with a mark of 5–3 in conference play, tying for third place the Big Ten. Indiana was invited to the Copper Bowl, where they beat Baylor, 24–0. The team played home games at Memorial Stadium in Bloomington, Indiana.

Vaughn Dunbar set the school record for rushing yards in a single season with 1,805 yards. This record stood until the 2014 season when it was broken by Tevin Coleman with 2,036 yards.

== Schedule ==
Date	Time	Opponent	Rank	Site	TV	Result	Attendance	Source
September 7	1:30 pm	at No. 7 Notre Dame*		Notre Dame Stadium; Notre Dame, IN	NBC	L 27–49	59,075	
September 21	12:30 pm	Kentucky*		Memorial Stadium; Bloomington, IN (rivalry)	ESPN	W 13–10	48,994	
September 28	2:00 pm	at Missouri*		Faurot Field; Columbia, MO		T 27–27	42,173	
October 5	2:00 pm	Michigan State		Memorial Stadium; Bloomington, IN (rivalry)		W 31–0	46,882	
October 12	2:00 pm	Northwestern^{†}		Memorial Stadium; Bloomington, IN		W 44–6	44,915	
October 19	12:30 pm	at No. 4 Michigan		Michigan Stadium; Ann Arbor, MI	ESPN	L 16–24	106,097	
October 26	2:00 pm	at Wisconsin		Camp Randall Stadium; Madison, WI		W 28–20	54,052	
November 2	1:00 pm	Minnesota		Memorial Stadium; Bloomington, IN		W 34–8	44,095	
November 9	3:30 pm	at No. 10 Iowa	No. 25	Kinnick Stadium; Iowa City, IA	ABC	L 21–38	70,220	
November 16	12:30 pm	at No. 19 Ohio State		Ohio Stadium; Columbus, OH	ESPN	L 16–20	93,417	
November 23	1:00 pm	Purdue		Memorial Stadium; Bloomington, IN (Old Oaken Bucket)	WTTV	W 24–22	51,596	
December 31	8:00 pm	vs. Baylor*		Arizona Stadium; Tucson, AZ (Copper Bowl)	TBS	W 24–0	35,751	
*Non-conference game; ^{†}Homecoming; Rankings from AP Poll released prior to the game; All times are in Eastern time; Source:

== Game summaries ==
=== At Notre Dame ===
Indiana at #7 Notre Dame

Team	1	2	3	4	Total
Hoosiers	3	14	3	7	27
• Fighting Irish	7	21	14	7	49

- Date: September 7
- Location: Notre Dame Stadium
- Game attendance: 59,075
- Television network: NBC

Scoring summary
1	IND	Bonnell 48 yard field goal	IND 3–0
1	ND	DuBose 49 yard interception return (Hentrich kick)	ND 7–3
2	IND	Green 5 yard run (Bonnell kick)	IND 10–7
2	ND	Culver 19 yard run (Hentrich kick)	ND 14–10
2	IND	Green 1 yard run (Bonnell kick)	IND 17–14
2	ND	Mirer 46 yard run (Hentrich kick)	ND 21–17
2	ND	T. Brooks 13 yard run (Hentrich kick)	ND 28–17
3	IND	Bonnell 29 yard field goal	ND 28–20
3	ND	Mirer 6 yard run (Hentrich kick)	ND 35–20
3	ND	I. Smith 58 yard pass from Mirer (Hentrich kick)	ND 42–20
4	IND	Walker 5 yard pass from Green (Bonnell kick)	ND 42–27
4	ND	Mirer 1 yard run (Hentrich kick)	ND 49–27

=== At Iowa ===
#25 Indiana at #10 Iowa

Team	1	2	3	4	Total
Hoosiers	0	6	3	12	21
• Hawkeyes	21	10	7	0	38

- Date: November 9
- Location: Kinnick Stadium, Iowa City, Iowa
- Game start: 2:40 pm CST
- Game attendance: 70,220
- Game weather: 40 °F (4 °C), Partly sunny, Wind SW 10–15 mph (16–24 km/h)
- Referee: Don Baur
- TV announcers (ABC): Brent Musburger and Dick Vermeil

Scoring summary
1	5:54	Iowa	Mike Saunders 1-yard pass from Jim Hartlieb (Skillett kick)	Iowa 7–0
1	5:09	Iowa	Saunders 14-yard run (Skillett kick)	Iowa 14-0
1	2:37	Iowa	Saunders 19-yard run (Skillett kick)	Iowa 21-0
2	10:28	Iowa	Jeff Skillett 26-yard field goal	Iowa 24-0
2	4:46	Indiana	Thomas Lewis 24-yard pass from Trent Green (kick failed)	Iowa 24-6
2	0:26	Iowa	Danan Hughes 26-yard pass from Hartlieb	Iowa 31-6
3	11:27	Indiana	Bonnell 33-yard field goal	Iowa 31–9
3	8:17	Iowa	Saunders 7-yard run (Skillett kick)	Iowa 38-9
4	13:44	Indiana	Lewis 11-yard pass from Trent Green (run failed)	Iowa 38-15
4	10:39	Indiana	Vaughn Dunbar 11-yard run (run failed)	Iowa 38–21

=== Purdue ===
External videos
- 1991 Purdue at Indiana – TV broadcast

== Roster ==
1991 Indiana Hoosiers football team roster
Players
Coaches
Offense

Pos.	#	Name	Class
RB	26	Vaughn Dunbar	Sr
QB	12	Trent Green	Jr
OT		Shawn Harper	Sr
WR	8	Thomas Lewis	So

Defense

Pos.	#	Name	Class

Special teams

Pos.	#	Name	Class
K	5	Scott Bonnell	Jr

Head coach

- Bill Mallory

Coordinators/assistant coaches

Legend

- (C) Team captain
- (S) Suspended
- (I) Ineligible
- Injured
- Redshirt

== After the season ==
=== NFL draft ===
The following Hoosiers were selected in the 1992 NFL draft after the season.

Round	Pick	Player	Position	NFL team
1	21	Vaughn Dunbar	Running back	New Orleans Saints
4	87	Shawn Harper	Tackle	Los Angeles Rams

== Awards and honors ==
- Vaughn Dunbar, first-team All-American
- Vaughn Dunbar, finished sixth in Heisman Trophy voting
- Vaughn Dunbar, ranked second in the nation in rushing yards per game
