= 1991 Ohio Bobcats football team =

American college football season

1991 Ohio Bobcats football
- Conference: Mid-American Conference
- Record: 2–8–1 (1–6–1 MAC)
- Head coach: Tom Lichtenberg (2nd season)
- Home stadium: Peden Stadium

1991 Mid-American Conference football standings
	Conf.					Overall
Team	W		L		T	W		L		T
Bowling Green $	8	–	0	–	0	11	–	1	–	0
Central Michigan	3	–	1	–	4	6	–	1	–	4
Miami (OH)	4	–	3	–	1	6	–	4	–	1
Toledo	4	–	3	–	1	5	–	5	–	1
Ball State	4	–	4	–	0	6	–	5	–	0
Western Michigan	4	–	4	–	0	6	–	5	–	0
Eastern Michigan	3	–	4	–	1	3	–	7	–	1
Ohio	1	–	6	–	1	2	–	8	–	1
Kent State	1	–	7	–	0	1	–	10	–	0
$ – Conference champion

The 1991 Ohio Bobcats football team was an American football team that represented Ohio University in the Mid-American Conference (MAC) during the 1991 NCAA Division I-A football season. In their second season under head coach Tom Lichtenberg, the Bobcats compiled a 2–8–1 record (1–6–1 against MAC opponents), finished in eighth place in the MAC, and were outscored by all opponents by a combined total of 308 to 176. They played their home games in Peden Stadium in Athens, Ohio.

== Schedule ==
Date	Opponent	Site	Result	Attendance	Source
August 31	Central Michigan	Peden Stadium; Athens, OH	T 17–17		
September 14	Tennessee Tech*	Peden Stadium; Athens, OH	W 35–14	11,750	
September 21	at Ole Miss*	Vaught–Hemingway Stadium; Oxford, MS	L 14–38	26,300	
September 28	at Western Michigan	Waldo Stadium; Kalamazoo, MI	L 9–35		
October 5	at Toledo	Glass Bowl; Toledo, OH	L 13–17	21,209	
October 12	Bowling Green	Peden Stadium; Athens, OH	L 14–45		
October 19	at Miami (OH)	Yager Stadium; Oxford, OH (rivalry)	L 0–34		
October 26	Kent State	Peden Stadium; Athens, OH	W 45–40		
November 2	at Ball State	Ball State Stadium; Muncie, IN	L 6–10		
November 9	Eastern Michigan	Peden Stadium; Athens, OH	L 10–13		
November 23	at No. 23 Tulsa*	Skelly Stadium; Tulsa, OK	L 13–45	23,237	
*Non-conference game; Rankings from AP Poll released prior to the game
