= 1991 Tulsa Golden Hurricane football team =

American college football season

1991 Tulsa Golden Hurricane football

Freedom Bowl, W 28–17 vs. San Diego State
- Conference: Independent

Ranking
- Coaches: No. 21
- AP: No. 21
- Record: 10–2
- Head coach: David Rader (4th season)
- Offensive coordinator: Rockey Felker (1st season)
- Defensive coordinator: Pete McGinnis (1st season)
- Home stadium: Skelly Stadium

1991 NCAA Division I-A independents football records
	Conf.			Overall
Team	W	L	T	W		L		T
No. 9 East Carolina		–		11	–	1	–	0
No. 4 Florida State		–		11	–	2	–	0
No. 3 Penn State		–		11	–	2	–	0
No. 21 Tulsa		–		10	–	2	–	0
Louisiana Tech		–		8	–	1	–	2
No. 13 Notre Dame		–		10	–	3	–	0
Akron		–		5	–	6	–	0
Memphis State		–		5	–	6	–	0
Army		–		4	–	7	–	0
Cincinnati		–		4	–	7	–	0
Southern Miss		–		4	–	7	–	0
South Carolina		–		3	–	6	–	2
Southwestern Louisiana		–		2	–	8	–	1
Louisville		–		2	–	9	–	0
Northern Illinois		–		2	–	9	–	0
Tulane		–		1	–	10	–	0
Navy		–		1	–	10	–	0
Rankings from AP Poll

The 1991 Tulsa Golden Hurricane football team represented the University of Tulsa during the 1991 NCAA Division I-A football season. In their fourth year under head coach David Rader, the Golden Hurricane compiled a 10–2 record and defeated San Diego State, 28–17, in the 1991 Freedom Bowl. During the regular season, the team defeated #15 Texas A&M (35–34) and lost to #2 Miami (10–34).

The team's statistical leaders included quarterback T. J. Rubley with 2,054 passing yards, Chris Hughley with 1,326 rushing yards, and Chris Penn with 792 receiving yards.

== Schedule ==
Date	Time	Opponent	Rank	Site	TV	Result	Attendance	Source
August 31		No. 17 Southwest Missouri State		Skelly Stadium; Tulsa, OK (I-AA)		W 34–13	31,124	
September 7	6:00 p.m.	Oklahoma State		Skelly Stadium; Tulsa, OK (rivalry)	PPV	W 13–7	39,479	
September 14	1:00 p.m.	at Kansas		Memorial Stadium; Lawrence, KS		L 17–23	35,000	
September 21	12:00 p.m.	No. 15 Texas A&M		Skelly Stadium; Tulsa, OK	Raycom	W 35–34	30,122	
September 28	1:00 p.m.	No. 2 Miami (FL)^{†}		Skelly Stadium; Tulsa, OK		L 10–34	35,689	
October 12		at Southwestern Louisiana		Cajun Field; Lafayette, LA		W 34–20	17,512	
October 26		at Memphis State		Liberty Bowl Memorial Stadium; Memphis, TN		W 33–28	17,502	
November 2		Southern Miss		Skelly Stadium; Tulsa, OK		W 13–10	27,784	
November 16		Louisville		Skelly Stadium; Tulsa, OK		W 40–0	31,717	
November 23		Ohio	No. 23	Skelly Stadium; Tulsa, OK		W 45–13	23,237	
November 30	2:00 p.m.	at SMU	No. 22	Ownby Stadium; University Park, TX		W 31–26	7,900	
December 30		vs. San Diego State*	No. 23	Anaheim Stadium; Anaheim, CA (Freedom Bowl)	Raycom	W 28–17	34,217	
*Non-conference game; ^{†}Homecoming; Rankings from AP Poll released prior to the game; All times are in Central time; Source:

== Roster ==
1991 Tulsa Golden Hurricane football team roster
Players
Coaches
Offense

Pos.	#	Name	Class
QB	12	Gus Frerotte	So
OT	55	Jerry Ostroski	Sr
QB	11	T. J. Rubley	Sr

Defense

Pos.	#	Name	Class
LB	24	Barry Minter	Jr
LB	97	Tracy Scroggins	Sr

Special teams

Pos.	#	Name	Class

Head coach

- David Rader

Coordinators/assistant coaches

Legend

- (C) Team captain
- (S) Suspended
- (I) Ineligible
- Injured
- Redshirt

== Rankings ==
Ranking movements Legend: ██ Increase in ranking ██ Decrease in ranking — = Not ranked
	Week															
Poll	Pre	1	2	3	4	5	6	7	8	9	10	11	12	13	14	Final
AP	—	—	—	—	—	—	—	—	—	—	—	—	23	22	23	21
Coaches Poll	—	—	—	—	—	—	—	—	—	—	—	—	—	—	25	21

== After the season ==
=== 1992 NFL draft ===
The following Golden Hurricane players were selected in the 1992 NFL draft following the season.

Round	Pick	Player	Position	NFL club
2	53	Tracy Scroggins	Defensive end	Detroit Lions
6	149	Fallon Wacasey	Tight end	Dallas Cowboys
9	228	T. J. Rubley	Quarterback	Los Angeles Rams
10	271	Jerry Ostroski	Guard	Kansas City Chiefs
