= 1991 South Carolina Gamecocks football team =

American college football season

1991 South Carolina Gamecocks football
- Conference: Independent
- Record: 3–6–2
- Head coach: Sparky Woods (3rd season)
- Offensive coordinator: Art Wilkins (3rd season)
- Defensive coordinator: Tommy West (1st season)
- Home stadium: Williams–Brice Stadium

1991 NCAA Division I-A independents football records
	Conf.			Overall
Team	W	L	T	W		L		T
No. 9 East Carolina		–		11	–	1	–	0
No. 4 Florida State		–		11	–	2	–	0
No. 3 Penn State		–		11	–	2	–	0
No. 21 Tulsa		–		10	–	2	–	0
Louisiana Tech		–		8	–	1	–	2
No. 13 Notre Dame		–		10	–	3	–	0
Akron		–		5	–	6	–	0
Memphis State		–		5	–	6	–	0
Army		–		4	–	7	–	0
Cincinnati		–		4	–	7	–	0
Southern Miss		–		4	–	7	–	0
South Carolina		–		3	–	6	–	2
Southwestern Louisiana		–		2	–	8	–	1
Louisville		–		2	–	9	–	0
Northern Illinois		–		2	–	9	–	0
Tulane		–		1	–	10	–	0
Navy		–		1	–	10	–	0
Rankings from AP Poll

The 1991 South Carolina Gamecocks football team represented the University of South Carolina as an independent during the 1991 NCAA Division I-A football season, finishing with a 3–6–2 record. The team played its home games at Williams–Brice Stadium. The Gamecocks were led by Sparky Woods in his third year as head coach.

This was the Gamecocks' 21st and final season as an independent. South Carolina joined the Southeastern Conference for the 1992 season after joining the conference in all other sports on July 1, 1991.

Led by returning starting quarterback Bobby Fuller, during a year when "if anything could go bad, it did", South Carolina's three wins were its fewest since 1986. In the season-opener against Duke at home, the Gamecocks were up by two scores near the end of the fourth quarter, but the Blue Devils scored fourteen points in the final seventy seconds to tie the game. For the Gamecocks, this would be the first of three consecutive losing seasons in the early 1990s, and the first of seven total losing seasons in the decade.

== Schedule ==
Date	Time	Opponent	Site	TV	Result	Attendance	Source
September 7	7:00 pm	Duke	Williams–Brice Stadium; Columbia, SC		T 24–24	71,200	
September 14	1:00 pm	at West Virginia	Mountaineer Field; Morgantown, WV		L 16–21	51,989	
September 21	7:00 pm	Virginia Tech	Williams–Brice Stadium; Columbia, SC		W 28–21	68,200	
September 28	1:30 pm	at East Carolina	Ficklen Memorial Stadium; Greenville, NC		L 20–31	33,100	
October 5	1:30 pm	East Tennessee State	Williams–Brice Stadium; Columbia, SC		W 55–7	55,832	
October 12	1:30 pm	Louisiana Tech	Williams–Brice Stadium; Columbia, SC		T 12–12	52,400	
October 19	1:30 pm	Georgia Tech	Williams–Brice Stadium; Columbia, SC		W 23–14	67,220	
November 2	4:00 pm	No. 19 NC State	Williams–Brice Stadium; Columbia, SC	ESPN	L 21–38	67,900	
November 9	12:00 pm	at No. 1 Florida State	Doak Campbell Stadium; Tallahassee, FL	JPS	L 10–38	60,244	
November 16	1:30 pm	at North Carolina	Kenan Memorial Stadium; Chapel Hill, NC (rivalry)		L 17–21	47,500	
November 23	1:30 pm	No. 14 Clemson	Williams–Brice Stadium; Columbia, SC (rivalry)	JPS	L 24–41	74,200	
Rankings from AP Poll released prior to the game; All times are in Eastern time

== Roster ==
Bobby Fuller* QB Wright Mitchell QB Brandon Bennett* RB Leroy Jeter* RB Rob DeBoer RB Terry Wilburn RB Albert Haynes RB Eddie Miller* WR Robert Brooks* WR David Pitchko WR Asim Penny WR Bralyn Bennett WR Bill Zorr WR Darren Greene WR Mike Whitman* TE Matthew Campbell TE Boomer Foster TE Roderick Howell TE Mathew Campbell TE Ernest Dye* OL Kenny Farrell* OL Jay Killen* OL Antoine Rivens* OL Rich Sweet* OL Vincent Dinkins OL Kevin Rosenkrans OL Cedric Bembery* DL Bobby Brown* DL Marty Dye* DL Troy Duke DL David Turnipseed DL Ernest Dixon* LB Eric Brown* LB Gerald Dixon* LB Robert Gibson* LB Keith Franklin LB Joe Reaves LB Keith Emmons LB Toby Cates* DB Jerry Inman* DB Bru Pender* DB Tony Watkins* DB Frank Adams DB Cedric Surratt DB Norman Greene DB Daren Parker P Harold Staley LS
