= 1991 Northern Illinois Huskies football team =

American college football season

1991 Northern Illinois Huskies football
- Conference: Independent
- Record: 2–9
- Head coach: Charlie Sadler (1st season)
- Captains: Adam Dach; Nick Jones; Mike Westrick
- Home stadium: Huskie Stadium

1991 NCAA Division I-A independents football records
	Conf.			Overall
Team	W	L	T	W		L		T
No. 9 East Carolina		–		11	–	1	–	0
No. 4 Florida State		–		11	–	2	–	0
No. 3 Penn State		–		11	–	2	–	0
No. 21 Tulsa		–		10	–	2	–	0
Louisiana Tech		–		8	–	1	–	2
No. 13 Notre Dame		–		10	–	3	–	0
Akron		–		5	–	6	–	0
Memphis State		–		5	–	6	–	0
Army		–		4	–	7	–	0
Cincinnati		–		4	–	7	–	0
Southern Miss		–		4	–	7	–	0
South Carolina		–		3	–	6	–	2
Southwestern Louisiana		–		2	–	8	–	1
Louisville		–		2	–	9	–	0
Northern Illinois		–		2	–	9	–	0
Tulane		–		1	–	10	–	0
Navy		–		1	–	10	–	0
Rankings from AP Poll

The 1991 Northern Illinois Huskies football team represented Northern Illinois University as an independent during the 1991 NCAA Division I-A football season. Led by first-year head coach Charlie Sadler, the Huskies compiled a record of 2–9. Northern Illinois played home games at Huskie Stadium in DeKalb, Illinois.

== Schedule ==
Date	Time	Opponent	Site	TV	Result	Attendance	Source
September 7	9:00 pm	at Fresno State	Bulldog Stadium; Fresno, CA		L 7–55	34,112	
September 14	6:30 pm	Arkansas State	Huskie Stadium; DeKalb, IL		W 22–21	14,583	
September 21	6:30 pm	at Kansas State	KSU Stadium; Manhattan, KS		L 17–34	27,229	
September 28	1:00 pm	at No. 9 Iowa	Kinnick Stadium; Iowa City, IA		L 7–58	70,220	
October 5	6:30 pm	Louisiana Tech	Huskie Stadium; DeKalb, IL		L 3–37	9,519	
October 12	1:00 pm	Western Michigan^{†}	Huskie Stadium; DeKalb, IL	SCC	L 10–22	15,725	
October 19	12:00 pm	at No. 6 Florida	Ben Hill Griffin Stadium; Gainesville, FL		L 10–41	83,708	
October 26	12:00 pm	at Akron	Rubber Bowl; Akron, OH		L 7–17	5,301	
November 2	1:00 pm	Southwestern Louisiana	Huskie Stadium; DeKalb, IL	SCC	L 12–13	11,093	
November 16	1:00 pm	Illinois State	Huskie Stadium; DeKalb, IL		W 27–24	6,943	
November 23	3:30 pm	at Toledo	Glass Bowl; Toledo, OH		L 21–42	11,752	
^{†}Homecoming; Rankings from AP Poll released prior to the game; All times are in Central time; Source:
