= 1991 Western Michigan Broncos football team =

American college football season

1991 Western Michigan Broncos football
- Conference: Mid-American Conference
- Record: 6–5 (4–4 MAC)
- Head coach: Al Molde (5th season)
- Offensive coordinator: Rob Kuhlman
- Defensive coordinator: Larry Edlund
- MVP: Greg Kelley
- Home stadium: Waldo Stadium

1991 Mid-American Conference football standings
	Conf.					Overall
Team	W		L		T	W		L		T
Bowling Green $	8	–	0	–	0	11	–	1	–	0
Central Michigan	3	–	1	–	4	6	–	1	–	4
Miami (OH)	4	–	3	–	1	6	–	4	–	1
Toledo	4	–	3	–	1	5	–	5	–	1
Ball State	4	–	4	–	0	6	–	5	–	0
Western Michigan	4	–	4	–	0	6	–	5	–	0
Eastern Michigan	3	–	4	–	1	3	–	7	–	1
Ohio	1	–	6	–	1	2	–	8	–	1
Kent State	1	–	7	–	0	1	–	10	–	0
$ – Conference champion

The 1991 Western Michigan Broncos football team represented Western Michigan University in the Mid-American Conference (MAC) during the 1991 NCAA Division I-A football season. In their fifth season under head coach Al Molde, the Broncos compiled a 6–5 record (4–4 against MAC opponents), finished in fifth place in the MAC, and were outscored by their opponents, 253 to 218. The team played its home games at Waldo Stadium in Kalamazoo, Michigan.

The team's statistical leaders included Brad Tayles with 1,949 passing yards, Corey Sylve with 711 rushing yards, and John Morton with 588 receiving yards.

== Schedule ==
Date	Opponent	Site	Result	Attendance	Source
August 31	Kent State	Waldo Stadium; Kalamazoo, MI	W 13–10		
September 7	Akron*	Waldo Stadium; Kalamazoo, MI	W 35–12	13,890	
September 14	at No. 1 Florida State*	Doak Campbell Stadium; Tallahassee, FL	L 0–58	60,913	
September 21	Toledo	Waldo Stadium; Kalamazoo, MI	L 13–23		
September 28	Ohio	Waldo Stadium; Kalamazoo, MI	W 35–9		
October 5	at Ball State	Ball State Stadium; Muncie, IN	W 25–16		
October 12	at Northern Illinois*	Huskie Stadium; DeKalb, IL	W 22–10	15,725	
October 19	at Eastern Michigan	Rynearson Stadium; Ypsilanti, MI	L 24–42		
October 26	Bowling Green	Waldo Stadium; Kalamazoo, MI	L 10–23		
November 9	Miami (OH)	Waldo Stadium; Kalamazoo, MI	W 24–23		
November 16	at Central Michigan	Kelly/Shorts Stadium; Mount Pleasant, MI (rivalry)	L 17–27		
*Non-conference game; Rankings from AP Poll released prior to the game
