= 1991 East Carolina Pirates football team =

American college football season

1991 East Carolina Pirates football

Peach Bowl champion

Peach Bowl, W 37–34 vs. NC State
- Conference: Independent

Ranking
- Coaches: No. 9
- AP: No. 9
- Record: 11–1
- Head coach: Bill Lewis (3rd season)
- Offensive coordinator: Steve Logan (2nd season)
- Offensive scheme: Pro-style
- Base defense: 4–2–5
- Home stadium: Ficklen Memorial Stadium

1991 NCAA Division I-A independents football records
	Conf.			Overall
Team	W	L	T	W		L		T
No. 9 East Carolina		–		11	–	1	–	0
No. 4 Florida State		–		11	–	2	–	0
No. 3 Penn State		–		11	–	2	–	0
No. 21 Tulsa		–		10	–	2	–	0
Louisiana Tech		–		8	–	1	–	2
No. 13 Notre Dame		–		10	–	3	–	0
Akron		–		5	–	6	–	0
Memphis State		–		5	–	6	–	0
Army		–		4	–	7	–	0
Cincinnati		–		4	–	7	–	0
Southern Miss		–		4	–	7	–	0
South Carolina		–		3	–	6	–	2
Southwestern Louisiana		–		2	–	8	–	1
Louisville		–		2	–	9	–	0
Northern Illinois		–		2	–	9	–	0
Tulane		–		1	–	10	–	0
Navy		–		1	–	10	–	0
Rankings from AP Poll

The 1991 East Carolina Pirates football team represented East Carolina University as an independent during the 1991 NCAA Division I-A football season. Led by Bill Lewis in his third and final year as head coach, the Pirates compiled a record of 11–1 and won the Peach Bowl, defeating in-state rival NC State. The team's offense scored 409 points while the defense allowed 277 points. East Carolina played home games at Ficklen Memorial Stadium in Greenville, North Carolina.

== Schedule ==
Date	Time	Opponent	Rank	Site	TV	Result	Attendance	Source
August 31	4:00 pm	at Illinois		Memorial Stadium; Champaign, IL	ESPN	L 31–38	46,313	
September 14	7:00 pm	Memphis State		Ficklen Memorial Stadium; Greenville, NC		W 20–13	32,382	
September 21	7:00 pm	at UCF		Florida Citrus Bowl; Orlando, FL		W 47–25	20,049	
September 28	1:30 pm	South Carolina		Ficklen Memorial Stadium; Greenville, NC		W 31–20	33,100	
October 5	1:30 pm	Akron^{†}		Ficklen Memorial Stadium; Greenville, NC		W 56–20	27,500	
October 12	1:30 pm	at No. 15 Syracuse		Carrier Dome; Syracuse, NY		W 23–20	37,767	
October 26	1:30 pm	No. 23 Pittsburgh	No. 20	Ficklen Memorial Stadium; Greenville, NC		W 24–23	36,000	
November 2	1:30 pm	Tulane	No. 17	Ficklen Memorial Stadium; Greenville, NC		W 38–28	31,126	
November 9	1:00 pm	at Southern Miss	No. 16	M. M. Roberts Stadium; Hattiesburg, MS		W 48–20	18,117	
November 16	1:00 pm	at Virginia Tech	No. 14	Lane Stadium; Blacksburg, VA		W 24–17	48,317	
November 23	1:00 pm	at Cincinnati	No. 13	Nippert Stadium; Cincinnati, OH		W 30–19	8,574	
January 1	11:30 am	vs. No. 21 NC State	No. 12	Atlanta–Fulton County Stadium; Atlanta, GA (Peach Bowl, rivalry)	ESPN	W 37–34	59,322	
^{†}Homecoming; Rankings from AP Poll released prior to the game; All times are in Eastern time

== Rankings ==
Ranking movements Legend: ██ Increase in ranking ██ Decrease in ranking — = Not ranked
	Week															
Poll	Pre	1	2	3	4	5	6	7	8	9	10	11	12	13	14	Final
AP	—	—	—	—	—	—	—	23	20	17	16	14	13	12	12	9
Coaches	—	—	—	—	—	—	—	—	24	20	19	17	15	15	13	9

== Game summaries ==
=== Vs. NC State (Peach Bowl) ===
NC State vs. East Carolina

Team	1	2	3	4	Total
Wolfpack	7	7	13	7	34
• Pirates	7	10	0	20	37

- Date: January 1
- Location: Atlanta–Fulton County Stadium, Atlanta, GA
- Game attendance: 59,322
- TV announcers (ESPN): Ron Franklin and Mike Gottfried

== Roster ==
1991 East Carolina Pirates football team roster
Players
Coaches
Offense

Pos.	#	Name	Class
OL		David Blackwell	So
QB	2	Jeff Blake	Sr
TE	88	Carlester Crumpler	So
TE	91	Luke Fisher	Sr
WR	82	Hunter Gallimore	Sr
WR		Dion Johnson	Sr

Defense

Pos.	#	Name	Class
DB	40	Chris Hall	Sr
LB	44	Robert Jones	Sr

Special teams

Pos.	#	Name	Class
P	19	John Jett	Sr

Head coach

- Bill Lewis

Coordinators/assistant coaches

Legend

- (C) Team captain
- (S) Suspended
- (I) Ineligible
- Injured
- Redshirt

== Awards and honors ==
- Bill Lewis, AFCA Coach of the Year

== After the season ==
=== NFL draft ===
The following Pirates were selected in the 1992 NFL draft after the season.

Round	Pick	Player	Position	NFL team
1	24	Robert Jones	Linebacker	Dallas Cowboys
6	166	Jeff Blake	Quarterback	New York Jets
8	210	Luke Fisher	Tight end	Minnesota Vikings
9	250	Chris Hall	Defensive back	Dallas Cowboys
10	274	Dion Johnson	Wide receiver	Houston Oilers
