= 1991 Toledo Rockets football team =

American college football season

1991 Toledo Rockets football
- Conference: Mid-American Conference
- Record: 5–5–1 (4–3–1 MAC)
- Head coach: Gary Pinkel (1st season)
- Offensive coordinator: Greg Meyer (2nd season)
- Offensive scheme: Pro-style
- Defensive coordinator: Dean Pees (2nd season)
- Base defense: 4–3
- Home stadium: Glass Bowl

1991 Mid-American Conference football standings
| | Conf. | | | | | Overall |
| Team | W | | L | | T | W | | L | | T |
|---|---|---|---|---|---|---|---|---|---|---|
| Bowling Green $ | 8 | – | 0 | – | 0 | 11 | – | 1 | – | 0 |
| Central Michigan | 3 | – | 1 | – | 4 | 6 | – | 1 | – | 4 |
| Miami (OH) | 4 | – | 3 | – | 1 | 6 | – | 4 | – | 1 |
| Toledo | 4 | – | 3 | – | 1 | 5 | – | 5 | – | 1 |
| Ball State | 4 | – | 4 | – | 0 | 6 | – | 5 | – | 0 |
| Western Michigan | 4 | – | 4 | – | 0 | 6 | – | 5 | – | 0 |
| Eastern Michigan | 3 | – | 4 | – | 1 | 3 | – | 7 | – | 1 |
| Ohio | 1 | – | 6 | – | 1 | 2 | – | 8 | – | 1 |
| Kent State | 1 | – | 7 | – | 0 | 1 | – | 10 | – | 0 |
$ – Conference champion

The 1991 Toledo Rockets football team was an American football team that represented the University of Toledo in the Mid-American Conference (MAC) during the 1991 NCAA Division I-A football season. In their first season under head coach Gary Pinkel, the Rockets compiled a 5–5–1 record (4–3–1 against MAC opponents), finished in a tie for third place in the MAC, and outscored all opponents by a combined total of 269 to 153.

The team's statistical leaders included Kevin Meger with 1,787 passing yards, Steve Cowan with 748 rushing yards, and Marcus Goodwin with 600 receiving yards.

== Schedule ==
| Date | Time | Opponent | Site | TV | Result | Attendance | Source |
|---|---|---|---|---|---|---|---|
| September 7 | 7:30 p.m. | Kansas* | Glass Bowl; Toledo, OH | KSMO | L 7–30 | 24,010 | |
| September 21 | | at Western Michigan | Waldo Stadium; Kalamazoo, MI | | W 23–13 | | |
| September 28 | | Central Michigan | Glass Bowl; Toledo, OH | | T 16–16 | | |
| October 5 | | Ohio | Glass Bowl; Toledo, OH | | W 17–13 | 21,209 | |
| October 12 | 3:30 p.m. | at No. 3 Washington* | Husky Stadium; Seattle, WA | Prime | L 0–48 | 72,266 | |
| October 19 | | at Bowling Green | Doyt Perry Stadium; Bowling Green, OH (rivalry) | | L 21–24 | | |
| October 26 | | Miami (OH) | Glass Bowl; Toledo, OH | | W 24–7 | 20,482 | |
| November 2 | | at Kent State | Dix Stadium; Kent, OH | | L 13–14 | 2,842 | |
| November 9 | | Ball State | Glass Bowl; Toledo, OH | | L 3–9 | 14,670 | |
| November 16 | | at Eastern Michigan | Rynearson Stadium; Ypsilanti, MI | | W 21–14 | 5,116 | |
| November 23 | | Northern Illinois* | Glass Bowl; Toledo, OH | | W 42–21 | 11,752 | |
*Non-conference game; Rankings from AP Poll released prior to the game; All times are in Eastern time

== After the season ==
=== NFL draft ===
The following Rockets were selected in the 1992 NFL draft following the season.

| Round | Pick | Player | Position | NFL club |
|---|---|---|---|---|
| 4 | 93 | Darren Anderson | Defensive back | New England Patriots |
| 11 | 307 | Vince Marrow | Tight end | Buffalo Bills |
