= 1991 Kent State Golden Flashes football team =

American college football season

1991 Kent State Golden Flashes football
- Conference: Mid-American Conference
- Record: 1–10 (1–7 MAC)
- Head coach: Pete Cordelli (1st season)
- Home stadium: Dix Stadium

1991 Mid-American Conference football standings
	Conf.					Overall
Team	W		L		T	W		L		T
Bowling Green $	8	–	0	–	0	11	–	1	–	0
Central Michigan	3	–	1	–	4	6	–	1	–	4
Miami (OH)	4	–	3	–	1	6	–	4	–	1
Toledo	4	–	3	–	1	5	–	5	–	1
Ball State	4	–	4	–	0	6	–	5	–	0
Western Michigan	4	–	4	–	0	6	–	5	–	0
Eastern Michigan	3	–	4	–	1	3	–	7	–	1
Ohio	1	–	6	–	1	2	–	8	–	1
Kent State	1	–	7	–	0	1	–	10	–	0
$ – Conference champion

The 1991 Kent State Golden Flashes football team was an American football team that represented Kent State University in the Mid-American Conference (MAC) during the 1991 NCAA Division I-A football season. In their first season under head coach Pete Cordelli, the Golden Flashes compiled a 1–10 record (1–7 against MAC opponents), finished in a tie for ninth place in the MAC, and were outscored by all opponents by a combined total of 307 to 159.

The team's statistical leaders included Brad Smith with 645 rushing yards, Kevin Shuman with 943 passing yards, and Shawn Barnes with 558 receiving yards.

== Schedule ==
Date	Opponent	Site	Result	Attendance	Source
August 31	at Western Michigan	Waldo Stadium; Kalamazoo, MI	L 10–13		
September 14	at NC State*	Carter–Finley Stadium; Raleigh, NC	L 0–47	42,914	
September 21	at Ball State	Ball State Stadium; Muncie, IN	L 27–28	13,121	
September 28	at Kentucky*	Commonwealth Stadium; Lexington, KY	L 6–24	56,150	
October 5	Eastern Michigan	Dix Stadium; Kent, OH	L 20–21	8,000	
October 12	Cincinnati*	Dix Stadium; Kent, OH	L 19–38	3,157	
October 19	Central Michigan	Dix Stadium; Kent, OH	L 7–23		
October 26	at Ohio	Peden Stadium; Athens, OH	L 40–45		
November 2	Toledo	Dix Stadium; Kent, OH	W 14–13	14,670	
November 9	at Bowling Green	Doyt Perry Stadium; Bowling Green, OH (Anniversary Award)	L 7–35	18,327	
November 16	Miami (OH)	Dix Stadium; Kent, OH	L 9–20	3,700	
*Non-conference game
