= 1991 Louisiana Tech Bulldogs football team =

American college football season

1991 Louisiana Tech Bulldogs football
- Conference: Independent
- Record: 8–1–2
- Head coach: Joe Raymond Peace (4th season)
- Defensive coordinator: John Thompson (2nd season)
- Captains: Lorenza Baker; Glenn Hunt
- Home stadium: Joe Aillet Stadium

1991 NCAA Division I-A independents football records
	Conf.			Overall
Team	W	L	T	W		L		T
No. 9 East Carolina		–		11	–	1	–	0
No. 4 Florida State		–		11	–	2	–	0
No. 3 Penn State		–		11	–	2	–	0
No. 21 Tulsa		–		10	–	2	–	0
Louisiana Tech		–		8	–	1	–	2
No. 13 Notre Dame		–		10	–	3	–	0
Akron		–		5	–	6	–	0
Memphis State		–		5	–	6	–	0
Army		–		4	–	7	–	0
Cincinnati		–		4	–	7	–	0
Southern Miss		–		4	–	7	–	0
South Carolina		–		3	–	6	–	2
Southwestern Louisiana		–		2	–	8	–	1
Louisville		–		2	–	9	–	0
Northern Illinois		–		2	–	9	–	0
Tulane		–		1	–	10	–	0
Navy		–		1	–	10	–	0
Rankings from AP Poll

The 1991 Louisiana Tech Bulldogs football team was an American football team that represented Louisiana Tech University as an independent during the 1991 NCAA Division I-A football season. In their fourth year under head coach Joe Raymond Peace, the team compiled an 8–1–2 record.

== Schedule ==
Date	Opponent	Site	Result	Attendance	Source
August 31	at No. 12 Houston	Houston Astrodome; Houston, TX	L 3–73	30,082	
September 14	Montana	Joe Aillet Stadium; Ruston, LA	W 21–11	17,825	
September 21	at Eastern Michigan	Rynearson Stadium; Ypsilanti, MI	W 17–14	13,941	
September 28	at Arkansas State	Indian Stadium; Jonesboro, AR	W 42–10	16,385	
October 5	at Northern Illinois	Huskie Stadium; DeKalb, IL	W 37–3	9,519	
October 12	at South Carolina	Williams–Brice Stadium; Columbia, SC	T 12–12	52,400	
October 26	at Southwestern Louisiana	Cajun Field; Lafayette, LA (rivalry)	T 14–14	18,083	
November 2	Northeast Louisiana	Joe Aillet Stadium; Ruston, LA (rivalry)	W 35–10	24,450	
November 9	Southern Illinois	Joe Aillet Stadium; Ruston, LA	W 48–16	15,650	
November 16	Southern Miss	Joe Aillet Stadium; Ruston, LA (Rivalry in Dixie)	W 30–14	11,200	
November 23	at UTEP	Sun Bowl; El Paso, TX	W 21–17	16,123	
Rankings from AP Poll released prior to the game

== After the season ==
=== NFL draft ===
The following Bulldog was selected in the 1992 NFL draft after the season.

Round	Pick	Player	Position	NFL team
12	310	Eric Shaw	Linebacker	Cincinnati Bengals
