= 1991 Louisville Cardinals football team =

American college football season

1991 Louisville Cardinals football
- Conference: Independent
- Record: 2–9
- Head coach: Howard Schnellenberger (7th season)
- Offensive coordinator: Gary Nord (3rd season)
- Defensive coordinator: Ty Smith (1st season)
- Home stadium: Cardinal Stadium

1991 NCAA Division I-A independents football records
	Conf.			Overall
Team	W	L	T	W		L		T
No. 9 East Carolina		–		11	–	1	–	0
No. 4 Florida State		–		11	–	2	–	0
No. 3 Penn State		–		11	–	2	–	0
No. 21 Tulsa		–		10	–	2	–	0
Louisiana Tech		–		8	–	1	–	2
No. 13 Notre Dame		–		10	–	3	–	0
Akron		–		5	–	6	–	0
Memphis State		–		5	–	6	–	0
Army		–		4	–	7	–	0
Cincinnati		–		4	–	7	–	0
Southern Miss		–		4	–	7	–	0
South Carolina		–		3	–	6	–	2
Southwestern Louisiana		–		2	–	8	–	1
Louisville		–		2	–	9	–	0
Northern Illinois		–		2	–	9	–	0
Tulane		–		1	–	10	–	0
Navy		–		1	–	10	–	0
Rankings from AP Poll

The 1991 Louisville Cardinals football team represented the University of Louisville as an independent during the 1991 NCAA Division I-A football season. Led by seventh-year head coach Howard Schnellenberger, the Cardinals compiled a record of 2–9. The team played home games in Cardinal Stadium in Louisville, Kentucky.

== Schedule ==
Date	Opponent	Site	TV	Result	Attendance	Source
August 31	Eastern Kentucky	Cardinal Stadium; Louisville, KY		W 24–14	38,542	
September 5	No. 11 Tennessee	Cardinal Stadium; Louisville, KY	ESPN	L 11–28	40,457	
September 14	at Ohio State	Ohio Stadium; Columbus, OH	ESPN	L 15–23	91,734	
September 28	Southern Miss	Cardinal Stadium; Louisville, KY		W 28–14	35,231	
October 5	Cincinnati	Cardinal Stadium; Louisville, KY (The Keg of Nails)		L 7–30	34,327	
October 12	at Boston College	Alumni Stadium; Chestnut Hill, MA		L 3–33	27,839	
October 19	Army	Cardinal Stadium; Louisville, KY		L 12–37	33,147	
October 26	at Virginia Tech	Lane Stadium; Blacksburg, VA		L 13–41	45,662	
November 2	No. 1 Florida State	Cardinal Stadium; Louisville, KY		L 15–40	34,270	
November 9	at Memphis State	Liberty Bowl Memorial Stadium; Memphis, TN (rivalry)		L 7–35	16,665	
November 16	at Tulsa	Skelly Stadium; Tulsa, OK		L 0–40	31,717	
Rankings from AP Poll released prior to the game; Source:

== Roster ==
1991 Louisville Cardinals football team roster
Players
Coaches
Offense

Pos.	#	Name	Class
QB	11	Jeff Brohm	So
QB	13	Erik Watts	Sr

Defense

Pos.	#	Name	Class
CB	34	Ray Buchanan	Jr

Special teams

Pos.	#	Name	Class
K	4	Klaus Wilmsmeyer	Sr

Head coach

- Howard Schnellenberger

Coordinators/assistant coaches

Legend

- (C) Team captain
- (S) Suspended
- (I) Ineligible
- Injured
- Redshirt

== After the season ==
=== NFL draft ===
The following Cardinal was selected in the 1992 NFL draft after the season.

Round	Pick	Player	Position	NFL team
12	311	Klaus Wilmsmeyer	Kicker	Tampa Bay Buccaneers
