= 1991 Southwestern Louisiana Ragin' Cajuns football team =

American college football season

1991 Southwestern Louisiana Ragin' Cajuns football
- Conference: Independent
- Record: 2–8–1
- Head coach: Nelson Stokley (6th season)
- Home stadium: Cajun Field

1991 NCAA Division I-A independents football records
	Conf.			Overall
Team	W	L	T	W		L		T
No. 9 East Carolina		–		11	–	1	–	0
No. 4 Florida State		–		11	–	2	–	0
No. 3 Penn State		–		11	–	2	–	0
No. 21 Tulsa		–		10	–	2	–	0
Louisiana Tech		–		8	–	1	–	2
No. 13 Notre Dame		–		10	–	3	–	0
Akron		–		5	–	6	–	0
Memphis State		–		5	–	6	–	0
Army		–		4	–	7	–	0
Cincinnati		–		4	–	7	–	0
Southern Miss		–		4	–	7	–	0
South Carolina		–		3	–	6	–	2
Southwestern Louisiana		–		2	–	8	–	1
Louisville		–		2	–	9	–	0
Northern Illinois		–		2	–	9	–	0
Tulane		–		1	–	10	–	0
Navy		–		1	–	10	–	0
Rankings from AP Poll

The 1991 Southwestern Louisiana Ragin' Cajuns football team was an American football team that represented the University of Southwestern Louisiana (now known as the University of Louisiana at Lafayette) as an independent during the 1991 NCAA Division I-A football season. In their sixth year under head coach Nelson Stokley, the team compiled a 2–8–1 record.

== Schedule ==
Date	Opponent	Site	Result	Attendance	Source
August 31	Northeast Louisiana	Cajun Field; Lafayette, LA (rivalry)	L 10–21	23,486	
September 7	at Central Michigan	Kelly/Shorts Stadium; Mount Pleasant, MI	L 24–27	17,116	
September 14	at Wyoming	War Memorial Stadium; Laramie, WY	L 15–28	15,866	
September 21	at Arkansas	Razorback Stadium; Fayetteville, AR	L 7–9	41,740	
September 28	at Texas A&M	Kyle Field; College Station, TX	L 7–34	56,271	
October 5	Miami (OH)^{†}	Cajun Field; Lafayette, LA	L 14–27	21,213	
October 12	Tulsa	Cajun Field; Lafayette, LA	L 20–34	17,512	
October 26	Louisiana Tech	Cajun Field; Lafayette, LA (rivalry)	T 14–14	18,083	
November 2	at Northern Illinois	Huskie Stadium; DeKalb, IL	W 13–12	11,093	
November 9	at Auburn	Jordan-Hare Stadium; Auburn, AL	L 7–50	62,557	
November 16	at Arkansas State	Indian Stadium; Jonesboro, AR	W 17–13	16,503	
^{†}Homecoming
