= 1991 Michigan State Spartans football team =

American college football season

1991 Michigan State Spartans football
- Conference: Big Ten Conference
- Record: 3–8 (3–5 Big Ten)
- Head coach: George Perles (9th season)
- Defensive coordinator: Norm Parker (4th season)
- MVPs: Chuck Bullough; Courtney Hawkins
- Captains: Alan Haller; Courtney Hawkins; Bill Johnson; Jim Johnson; Brian Vooletich
- Home stadium: Spartan Stadium

1991 Big Ten Conference football standings
	Conf.					Overall
Team	W		L		T	W		L		T
No. 6 Michigan $	8	–	0	–	0	10	–	2	–	0
No. 10 Iowa	7	–	1	–	0	10	–	1	–	1
Ohio State	5	–	3	–	0	8	–	4	–	0
Indiana	5	–	3	–	0	7	–	4	–	1
Illinois	4	–	4	–	0	6	–	6	–	0
Purdue	3	–	5	–	0	4	–	7	–	0
Michigan State	3	–	5	–	0	3	–	8	–	0
Wisconsin	2	–	6	–	0	5	–	6	–	0
Northwestern	2	–	6	–	0	3	–	8	–	0
Minnesota	1	–	7	–	0	2	–	9	–	0
$ – Conference champion; Rankings from AP Poll

The 1991 Michigan State Spartans football team competed on behalf of Michigan State University as a member of the Big Ten Conference during the 1991 NCAA Division I-A football season. Led by ninth-year head coach George Perles, the Spartans compiled an overall record of 3–8 overall with a mark of 3–5 in conference play, tying for sixth place in the Big Ten. Michigan State played home games at Spartan Stadium in East Lansing, Michigan.

== Schedule ==
Date	Time	Opponent	Rank	Site	TV	Result	Attendance	Source
September 14	1:05 p.m.	Central Michigan*	No. 18	Spartan Stadium; East Lansing, MI		L 3–20	71,629	
September 21	2:30 p.m.	at No. 11 Notre Dame*		Notre Dame Stadium; Notre Dame, IN (rivalry)	NBC	L 10–49	59,075	
September 28	1:05 p.m.	Rutgers*		Spartan Stadium; East Lansing, MI		L 7–14	67,636	
October 5	2:00 p.m.	at Indiana		Memorial Stadium; Bloomington, IN (rivalry)		L 0–31	46,882	
October 12	12:30 p.m.	No. 5 Michigan		Spartan Stadium; East Lansing, MI (rivalry)	ESPN	L 28–45	80,157	
October 19	1:05 p.m.	Minnesota^{†}		Spartan Stadium; East Lansing, MI		W 20–12	75,097	
October 26	3:30 p.m.	at No. 14 Ohio State		Ohio Stadium; Columbus, OH	ABC	L 17–27	94,341	
November 2	1:05 p.m.	Northwestern		Spartan Stadium; East Lansing, MI		L 13–16	64,991	
November 9	2:00 p.m.	at Wisconsin		Camp Randall Stadium; Madison, WI		W 20–7	41,074	
November 16	1:00 p.m.	at Purdue		Ross–Ade Stadium; West Lafayette, IN		L 17–27	30,399	
November 23	1:05 p.m.	Illinois		Spartan Stadium; East Lansing, MI		W 27–24	61,721	
*Non-conference game; ^{†}Homecoming; Rankings from AP Poll released prior to the game; All times are in Eastern time; Source:

== Roster ==
1991 Michigan State Spartans football team roster
Players
Coaches
Offense

Pos.	#	Name	Class
RB	49	Brice Abrams	Jr
WR	14	Tim Bryan	Jr
OT	79	Brian DeMarco	Fr
TE	23	Ty Hallock	Jr
OT	63	Shane Hannah	Fr
WR	9	Courtney Hawkins	Sr
G	67	Toby Heaton	Jr
OT	69	Jim Johnson	Sr
TE	85	Mitch Lyons	Jr
WR	17	Mark MacFarland	Sr
QB	16	Jim Miller	So
C	56	Chris Piwowarczyk	Sr
G	50	Roosevelt Wagner	Jr

Defense

Pos.	#	Name	Class
SS	24	Myron Bell	So
LB	41	Chuck Bullough	Sr
LB	45	Matt Christensen
DT	93	Mike Edwards	Jr
LB	83	Rob Fredrickson	So
CB	23	Alan Haller	Sr
DT	99	Willie Hill	Jr
DE	96	Bill Johnson	Sr
FS	2	Corey Keyes	So
DE	84	John MacNeill	Sr
DT	91	Ed O'Bradovich	Sr
FS	33	Brian Vooletich	Sr
SS	37	Steve Wasylk	So
DB	18	Brian Winters	So

Special teams

Pos.	#	Name	Class

Head coach

- George Perles

Coordinators/assistant coaches

- Dan Enos (Graduate assistant)

Legend

- (C) Team captain
- (S) Suspended
- (I) Ineligible
- Injured
- Redshirt

== 1992 NFL draft ==
The following players were selected in the 1992 NFL draft.

Player	Round	Pick	Position	NFL team
Courtney Hawkins	2	44	Wide receiver	Tampa Bay Buccaneers
Bill Johnson	3	65	Defensive tackle	Cleveland Browns
Alan Haller	5	123	Defensive back	Pittsburgh Steelers
Jim Johnson	7	181	Tackle	Denver Broncos
Chuck Bullough	8	214	Linebacker	Philadelphia Eagles
John MacNeill	12	320	Defensive end	Seattle Seahawks
