= 1991 Akron Zips football team =

American college football season

1991 Akron Zips football
- Conference: Independent
- Record: 5–6
- Head coach: Gerry Faust (6th season)
- Offensive coordinator: Ron Toman (2nd season)
- Defensive coordinator: Bob Junko (4th season)
- Home stadium: Rubber Bowl

1991 NCAA Division I-A independents football records
	Conf.			Overall
Team	W	L	T	W		L		T
No. 9 East Carolina		–		11	–	1	–	0
No. 4 Florida State		–		11	–	2	–	0
No. 3 Penn State		–		11	–	2	–	0
No. 21 Tulsa		–		10	–	2	–	0
Louisiana Tech		–		8	–	1	–	2
No. 13 Notre Dame		–		10	–	3	–	0
Akron		–		5	–	6	–	0
Memphis State		–		5	–	6	–	0
Army		–		4	–	7	–	0
Cincinnati		–		4	–	7	–	0
Southern Miss		–		4	–	7	–	0
South Carolina		–		3	–	6	–	2
Southwestern Louisiana		–		2	–	8	–	1
Louisville		–		2	–	9	–	0
Northern Illinois		–		2	–	9	–	0
Tulane		–		1	–	10	–	0
Navy		–		1	–	10	–	0
Rankings from AP Poll

The 1991 Akron Zips football team represented Akron University in the 1991 NCAA Division I-A football season as Division I-A independents. They were led by sixth–year head coach Gerry Faust. The Zips played their home games at the Rubber Bowl in Akron, Ohio. They finished the season with a record of 5–6.

== Schedule ==
Date	Opponent	Site	Result	Attendance	Source
September 7	at Western Michigan	Waldo Stadium; Kalamazoo, MI	L 12–35	13,890	
September 14	Illinois State	Rubber Bowl; Akron, OH	L 3–25	20,680	
September 21	at Central Michigan	Kelly/Shorts Stadium; Mount Pleasant, MI	L 29–31	21,841	
September 28	Northern Arizona	Rubber Bowl; Akron, OH	W 49–14	7,054	
October 5	at East Carolina	Ficklen Memorial Stadium; Greenville, NC	L 20–56	27,500	
October 12	No. 18 (I-AA) Youngstown State	Rubber Bowl; Akron, OH (Steel Tire)	W 38–24	6,335	
October 19	Arkansas State	Rubber Bowl; Akron, OH	W 28–23	2,530	
October 26	Northern Illinois	Rubber Bowl; Akron, OH	W 17–7	5,301	
November 9	at Virginia Tech	Lane Stadium; Blacksburg, VA	L 24–42	31,221	
November 16	at Army	Michie Stadium; West Point, NY	L 0–19	34,410	
November 23	at Temple	Veterans Stadium; Philadelphia, PA	W 37–32	5,183	
Rankings from AP Poll released prior to the game; Source:
