= 1991 Memphis State Tigers football team =

American college football season

1991 Memphis State Tigers football
- Conference: Independent
- Record: 5–6
- Head coach: Chuck Stobart (3rd season)
- Defensive coordinator: Joe Lee Dunn (2nd season)
- Base defense: 3–3–5
- Home stadium: Liberty Bowl Memorial Stadium

1991 NCAA Division I-A independents football records
	Conf.			Overall
Team	W	L	T	W		L		T
No. 9 East Carolina		–		11	–	1	–	0
No. 4 Florida State		–		11	–	2	–	0
No. 3 Penn State		–		11	–	2	–	0
No. 21 Tulsa		–		10	–	2	–	0
Louisiana Tech		–		8	–	1	–	2
No. 13 Notre Dame		–		10	–	3	–	0
Akron		–		5	–	6	–	0
Memphis State		–		5	–	6	–	0
Army		–		4	–	7	–	0
Cincinnati		–		4	–	7	–	0
Southern Miss		–		4	–	7	–	0
South Carolina		–		3	–	6	–	2
Southwestern Louisiana		–		2	–	8	–	1
Louisville		–		2	–	9	–	0
Northern Illinois		–		2	–	9	–	0
Tulane		–		1	–	10	–	0
Navy		–		1	–	10	–	0
Rankings from AP Poll

The 1991 Memphis State Tigers football team represented Memphis State University (now known as the University of Memphis) as an independent in the 1991 NCAA Division I-A football season. The team was led by fifth-year head coach Chuck Stobart and their home games at the Liberty Bowl Memorial Stadium in Memphis, Tennessee.

== Schedule ==
Date	Opponent	Site	TV	Result	Attendance	Source
September 2	at No. 16 USC	Los Angeles Memorial Coliseum; Los Angeles, CA		W 24–10	55,637	
September 7	Ole Miss	Liberty Bowl Memorial Stadium; Memphis, TN (rivalry)		L 0–10	65,483	
September 14	at East Carolina	Ficklen Memorial Stadium; Greenville, NC		L 13–20	32,382	
September 21	Arkansas State	Liberty Bowl Memorial Stadium; Memphis, TN (Paint Bucket Bowl)		W 31–21	38,452	
October 5	at Missouri	Faurot Field; Columbia, MO		L 21–31	42,925	
October 12	Southern Miss	Liberty Bowl Memorial Stadium; Memphis, TN (Black and Blue Bowl)		W 17–12	19,162	
October 19	at Mississippi State	Scott Field; Starkville, MS		W 28–23	38,357	
October 26	Tulsa^{†}	Liberty Bowl Memorial Stadium; Memphis, TN		L 28–33	17,502	
November 2	at No. 14 Tennessee	Neyland Stadium; Knoxville, TN	TBS	L 24–52	96,664	
November 9	Louisville	Liberty Bowl Memorial Stadium; Memphis, TN (rivalry)		W 35–7	16,665	
November 16	No. 7 Alabama	Liberty Bowl Memorial Stadium; Memphis, TN		L 7–10	34,632	
^{†}Homecoming; Rankings from AP Poll released prior to the game; Source:

== Roster ==
1991 Memphis State Tigers football team roster
Players			Coaches
Offense: Pos. / # / Name / Class	Defense: Pos. / # / Name / Class; DT / 67 / Tony Semple / So	Special teams: Pos. / # / Name / Class	Head coach: Chuck Stobart; Coordinators/assistant coaches Legend: (C) Team captain; (S) Suspended; (I) Ineligible; Injured; Redshirt
