= 1991 Bowling Green Falcons football team =

American college football season

1991 Bowling Green Falcons football

MAC champion California Bowl champion

California Bowl, W 28–21 vs. Fresno State
- Conference: Mid-American Conference
- Record: 11–1 (8–0 MAC)
- Head coach: Gary Blackney (1st season)
- Defensive coordinator: Paul Ferraro (1st season)
- Home stadium: Doyt Perry Stadium

1991 Mid-American Conference football standings
	Conf.					Overall
Team	W		L		T	W		L		T
Bowling Green $	8	–	0	–	0	11	–	1	–	0
Central Michigan	3	–	1	–	4	6	–	1	–	4
Miami (OH)	4	–	3	–	1	6	–	4	–	1
Toledo	4	–	3	–	1	5	–	5	–	1
Ball State	4	–	4	–	0	6	–	5	–	0
Western Michigan	4	–	4	–	0	6	–	5	–	0
Eastern Michigan	3	–	4	–	1	3	–	7	–	1
Ohio	1	–	6	–	1	2	–	8	–	1
Kent State	1	–	7	–	0	1	–	10	–	0
$ – Conference champion

The 1991 Bowling Green Falcons football team was an American football team that represented Bowling Green University in the Mid-American Conference (MAC) during the 1991 NCAA Division I-A football season. In their first season under head coach Gary Blackney, the Falcons compiled an 11–1 record (8–0 against MAC opponents), won the MAC championship, defeated Fresno State in the California Bowl, and outscored all opponents by a combined total of 279 to 168.

The team's statistical leaders included Erik White with 2,204 passing yards, LeRoy Smith with 887 rushing yards, and Mark Szlachcic with 943 receiving yards.

== Schedule ==
Date	Time	Opponent	Site	Result	Attendance	Source
August 31		Eastern Michigan	Doyt Perry Stadium; Bowling Green, OH	W 17–6		
September 7	1:00 p.m.	at West Virginia*	Mountaineer Field; Morgantown, WV	L 17–24	32,597	
September 21		Cincinnati*	Doyt Perry Stadium; Bowling Green, OH	W 20–16	15,172	
September 28		at Navy*	Navy–Marine Corps Memorial Stadium; Annapolis, MD	W 22–19	20,744	
October 5		Central Michigan	Doyt Perry Stadium; Bowling Green, OH	W 17–10		
October 12		at Ohio	Peden Stadium; Athens, OH	W 45–14		
October 19		Toledo	Doyt Perry Stadium; Bowling Green, OH (rivalry)	W 24–21		
October 26		at Western Michigan	Waldo Stadium; Kalamazoo, MI	W 23–10		
November 2		at Miami (OH)	Yager Stadium; Oxford, OH	W 17–7	27,884	
November 9		Kent State	Doyt Perry Stadium; Bowling Green, OH (Anniversary Award)	W 35–7	18,327	
November 16		at Ball State	Ball State Stadium; Muncie, IN	W 14–13		
December 14		at Fresno State*	Bulldog Stadium; Fresno, CA (California Bowl)	W 28–21	34,877	
*Non-conference game; All times are in Eastern time
