= 1991 Miami Redskins football team =

American college football season

1991 Miami Redskins football
- Conference: Mid-American Conference
- Record: 6–4–1 (4–3–1 MAC)
- Head coach: Randy Walker (2nd season)
- Defensive coordinator: Tim Carras (2nd season)
- Home stadium: Yager Stadium

1991 Mid-American Conference football standings
	Conf.					Overall
Team	W		L		T	W		L		T
Bowling Green $	8	–	0	–	0	11	–	1	–	0
Central Michigan	3	–	1	–	4	6	–	1	–	4
Miami (OH)	4	–	3	–	1	6	–	4	–	1
Toledo	4	–	3	–	1	5	–	5	–	1
Ball State	4	–	4	–	0	6	–	5	–	0
Western Michigan	4	–	4	–	0	6	–	5	–	0
Eastern Michigan	3	–	4	–	1	3	–	7	–	1
Ohio	1	–	6	–	1	2	–	8	–	1
Kent State	1	–	7	–	0	1	–	10	–	0
$ – Conference champion

The 1991 Miami Redskins football team was an American football team that represented Miami University in the Mid-American Conference (MAC) during the 1991 NCAA Division I-A football season. In its second season under head coach Randy Walker, the team compiled a 6–4–1 record (4–3–1 against MAC opponents), finished in a tie for third place in the MAC, and outscored all opponents by a combined total of 214 to 140.

The team's statistical leaders included Jim Clement with 938 passing yards, Kevin Ellerbe with 708 rushing yards, and Milt Stegall with 489 receiving yards.

== Schedule ==
Date	Opponent	Site	Result	Attendance	Source
August 31	Ball State	Yager Stadium; Oxford, OH	W 15–7		
September 7	at Kentucky*	Commonwealth Stadium; Lexington, KY	L 20–23	58,100	
September 14	at Eastern Michigan	Yager Stadium; Oxford, OH	W 29–3		
September 28	at Cincinnati*	Nippert Stadium; Cincinnati, OH (rivalry)	W 22–9	18,261	
October 5	at Southwestern Louisiana*	Cajun Field; Lafayette, LA	W 27–14	21,213	
October 12	at Central Michigan	Kelly/Shorts Stadium; Mount Pleasant, MI	T 10–10		
October 19	Ohio	Yager Stadium; Oxford, OH (rivalry)	W 34–0		
October 26	at Toledo	Glass Bowl; Toledo, OH	L 7–24	20,482	
November 2	Bowling Green	Yager Stadium; Oxford, OH	L 7–17	27,884	
November 9	at Western Michigan	Waldo Stadium; Kalamazoo, MI	L 23–24		
November 16	at Kent State	Dix Stadium; Kent, OH	W 20–9	3,700	
*Non-conference game
