= 1991 Navy Midshipmen football team =

American college football season

1991 Navy Midshipmen football
- Conference: Independent
- Record: 1–10
- Head coach: George Chaump (2nd season)
- MVP: Byron Ogden
- Captains: B. J. Mason; Byron Ogden
- Home stadium: Navy–Marine Corps Memorial Stadium

1991 NCAA Division I-A independents football records
	Conf.			Overall
Team	W	L	T	W		L		T
No. 9 East Carolina		–		11	–	1	–	0
No. 4 Florida State		–		11	–	2	–	0
No. 3 Penn State		–		11	–	2	–	0
No. 21 Tulsa		–		10	–	2	–	0
Louisiana Tech		–		8	–	1	–	2
No. 13 Notre Dame		–		10	–	3	–	0
Akron		–		5	–	6	–	0
Memphis State		–		5	–	6	–	0
Army		–		4	–	7	–	0
Cincinnati		–		4	–	7	–	0
Southern Miss		–		4	–	7	–	0
South Carolina		–		3	–	6	–	2
Southwestern Louisiana		–		2	–	8	–	1
Louisville		–		2	–	9	–	0
Northern Illinois		–		2	–	9	–	0
Tulane		–		1	–	10	–	0
Navy		–		1	–	10	–	0
Rankings from AP Poll

The 1991 Navy Midshipmen football team represented the United States Naval Academy as an independent school during the 1991 NCAA Division I-A football season. Led by George Chaump in his second season as head coach, the Midshipmen compiled an overall record of 1–10. Navy played home games at Navy–Marine Corps Memorial Stadium in Annapolis, Maryland. It was the program's fewest wins in a season since the winless 1948 season.

== Schedule ==
Date	Time	Opponent	Site	TV	Result	Attendance	Source
September 7		Ball State	Navy–Marine Corps Memorial Stadium; Annapolis, MD		L 10–33	22,661	
September 14	7:00 p.m.	at Virginia	Scott Stadium; Charlottesville, VA		L 10–17	42,400	
September 21		No. 11 William & Mary	Navy–Marine Corps Memorial Stadium; Annapolis, MD		L 21–26	23,697	
September 28		Bowling Green	Navy–Marine Corps Memorial Stadium; Annapolis, MD		L 19–22	20,744	
October 12		Air Force	Navy–Marine Corps Memorial Stadium; Annapolis, MD (Commander-in-Chief's Trophy)		L 6–46	35,640	
October 19		at Temple	Veterans Stadium; Philadelphia, PA		L 14–21	17,450	
October 26		No. 11 Delaware^{†}	Navy–Marine Corps Memorial Stadium; Annapolis, MD		L 25–29	30,490	
November 2	4:00 p.m.	at No. 5 Notre Dame	Notre Dame Stadium; Notre Dame, IN (rivalry)	NBC	L 0–38	59,075	
November 9		at Tulane	Louisiana Superdome; New Orleans, LA		L 7–34	23,322	
November 23	1:30 p.m.	Wake Forest	Navy–Marine Corps Memorial Stadium; Annapolis, MD		L 24–52	22,276	
December 7		vs. Army	Veterans Stadium; Philadelphia, PA (Army–Navy Game)		W 24–3	67,858	
^{†}Homecoming; Rankings from AP Poll released prior to the game; All times are in Eastern time; Source:

== Game summaries ==
=== Army ===
Army Cadets (4–6) vs. Navy Midshipmen (0–10)

Quarter	1	2	3	4	Total
Navy	0	14	0	10	24
Army	3	0	0	0	3

at Veterans Stadium, Philadelphia, Pennsylvania

- Date: December 7, 1991
- Game weather: Sunny
- Game attendance: 67,858
- TV announcers (ABC): Keith Jackson, Bob Griese, and Jack Arute
- New York Times. 1991 Dec 08.

Game information

First quarter

- ARMY – Patmon Malcolm 39-yard field goal. Army 3–0. Drive: 43 yards.

Second quarter

- NAVY – Jason Van Matre 3-yard run (kick good). Navy 7–3. Drive: 76 yards.
- NAVY – Billy James 5-yard run (kick good). Navy 14–3. Drive: 8 plays, 25 yards.

Fourth quarter

- NAVY – Kevin Hickman 12-yard pass from Jason Van Matre (kick good). Navy 21–3. Drive:
- NAVY – Tim Rogers 31-yard field goal. Navy 24–3. Drive:

Top passers

- NAVY – Jim Kubiak – 13/16, 157 yards
- ARMY

Top rushers

- NAVY – Jason Van Matre – 25 rushes, 89 yards, TD
- ARMY

Top receivers

- NAVY
- ARMY

The Midshipmen managed to steal all four Army mules in the week prior to the game.

== Roster ==
1991 Navy Midshipmen football team roster
Players
Coaches
Offense

Pos.	#	Name	Class
TE	81	David Anderson	Sr
OL		Bill Bensch
G	79	Michael Davis	Sr
QB		Brian Ellis
TE		Tony Gilless
TE		Kevin Hickman
RB		Duke Ingraham
RB		Billy James
QB	15	Jim Kubiak	Fr
OT	59	Max Lane	So
WR	9	B.J. Mason (C)	Sr
QB	5	Jason Van Matre	So
C	67	Steve Palmer	Sr
WR		Tom Pritchard
WR		Jimmy Screen
RB		Vinnie Smith
FB	46	Brad Stramanak	So
OT	58	Blair Sokol	So
QB		Joe Spencer
QB, RB		Jason Van Matre
G	65	Carl Voss	Sr
RB		Jeff Williams

Defense

Pos.	#	Name	Class
DT	71	Chris Alexander	Sr
DB	25	Chad Chatlos	Jr
DB	22	Chris Cordero	Sr
LB	40	Mark Ellis	Jr
DB		Grover Favors
DT	76	Robert Goodson	Jr
DB		Chris Hart
LB		Steve Himelspach
LB		Clayton Kendrick-Holmes
DT	90	Bob Kuberski	Jr
DB		Mark McGinnis
LB	55	Byron Ogden (C)	Sr
DL		Dan Pidgeon
DB		Rodney Purifoy
LB	62	David Shaw	So
DL		Ches Snider
DT	99	Steve Sterlitz
DB	2	Bill Yancey	Sr
LB		Javier Zuluga

Special teams

Pos.	#	Name	Class
K		Tim Rogers
KR		Cleavon Smith

Head coach

- George Chaump

Coordinators/assistant coaches

Legend

- (C) Team captain
- (S) Suspended
- (I) Ineligible
- Injured
- Redshirt
