= 1991 Cincinnati Bearcats football team =

American college football season

1991 Cincinnati Bearcats football
- Conference: Independent
- Record: 4–7
- Head coach: Tim Murphy (3rd season)
- Defensive coordinator: John Lovett (3rd season)
- Home stadium: Nippert Stadium

1991 NCAA Division I-A independents football records
| | Conf. | | | Overall |
| Team | W | L | T | W | | L | | T |
|---|---|---|---|---|---|---|---|---|
| No. 9 East Carolina | | – | | 11 | – | 1 | – | 0 |
| No. 4 Florida State | | – | | 11 | – | 2 | – | 0 |
| No. 3 Penn State | | – | | 11 | – | 2 | – | 0 |
| No. 21 Tulsa | | – | | 10 | – | 2 | – | 0 |
| Louisiana Tech | | – | | 8 | – | 1 | – | 2 |
| No. 13 Notre Dame | | – | | 10 | – | 3 | – | 0 |
| Akron | | – | | 5 | – | 6 | – | 0 |
| Memphis State | | – | | 5 | – | 6 | – | 0 |
| Army | | – | | 4 | – | 7 | – | 0 |
| Cincinnati | | – | | 4 | – | 7 | – | 0 |
| Southern Miss | | – | | 4 | – | 7 | – | 0 |
| South Carolina | | – | | 3 | – | 6 | – | 2 |
| Southwestern Louisiana | | – | | 2 | – | 8 | – | 1 |
| Louisville | | – | | 2 | – | 9 | – | 0 |
| Northern Illinois | | – | | 2 | – | 9 | – | 0 |
| Tulane | | – | | 1 | – | 10 | – | 0 |
| Navy | | – | | 1 | – | 10 | – | 0 |
Rankings from AP Poll

The 1991 Cincinnati Bearcats football team represented the University of Cincinnati during the 1991 NCAA Division I-A football season. The Bearcats, led by head coach Tim Murphy, participated as independent and played their home games at Nippert Stadium.

== Schedule ==
| Date | Time | Opponent | Site | TV | Result | Attendance | Source |
|---|---|---|---|---|---|---|---|
| September 7 | 12:10 p.m. | at No. 5 Penn State | Beaver Stadium; University Park, PA | Prime | L 0–81 | 94,000 | |
| September 14 | 7:00 p.m. | at North Carolina | Kenan Memorial Stadium; Chapel Hill, NC | | L 16–51 | 51,800 | |
| September 21 | | at Bowling Green | Doyt Perry Stadium; Bowling Green, OH | | L 16–20 | 15,172 | |
| September 28 | | Miami (OH) | Nippert Stadium; Cincinnati, OH (Victory Bell) | | L 9–22 | 18,261 | |
| October 5 | | at Louisville | Cardinal Stadium; Louisville, KY (The Keg of Nails) | | W 30–7 | 34,327 | |
| October 12 | | at Kent State | Dix Stadium; Kent, OH | | W 38–19 | 3,157 | |
| October 19 | 1:00 p.m. | at Virginia Tech | Lane Stadium; Blacksburg, VA | | L 9–56 | 36,312 | |
| October 26 | | Southern Miss | Nippert Stadium; Cincinnati, OH | | W 17–7 | 15,899 | |
| November 2 | | at Kentucky | Commonwealth Stadium; Lexington, KY | | L 17–20 | 45,850 | |
| November 9 | | No. 6 (I-AA) Middle Tennessee | Nippert Stadium; Cincinnati, OH | | W 30–10 | 8,761 | |
| November 23 | 1:00 p.m. | No. 13 East Carolina | Nippert Stadium; Cincinnati, OH | | L 19–30 | 8,574 | |
Rankings from AP Poll released prior to the game; All times are in Eastern time

== Roster ==
1991 Cincinnati Bearcats football team roster
Players
Coaches
Offense

| Pos. | # | Name | Class |

Defense

| Pos. | # | Name | Class |
|---|---|---|---|
| DE | 97 | Vaughn Booker | Sr |
| CB | 6 | Jocelyn Borgella | So |
| LB | 49 | Nate Dingle | So |
| DE | 55 | Tommy Meyer |

Special teams

| Pos. | # | Name | Class |

Head coach

- Tim Murphy

Coordinators/assistant coaches

- Craig Ver Steeg (WR/RC)

Legend

- (C) Team captain
- (S) Suspended
- (I) Ineligible
- Injured
- Redshirt
