= 1992 Peach Bowl =

American college football game

- 24th Peach Bowl
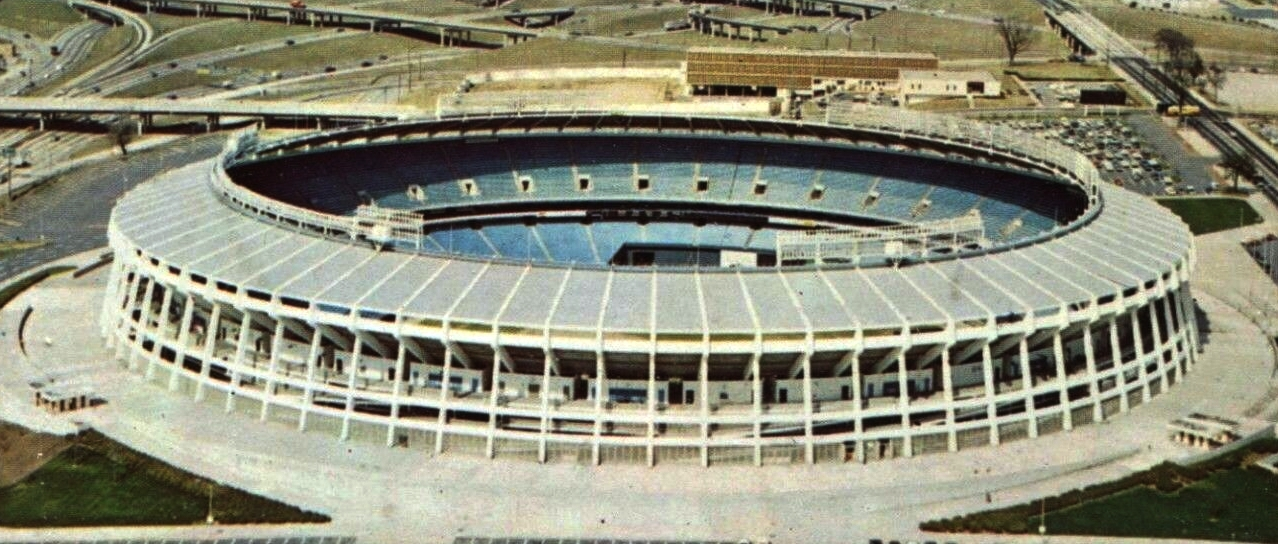
- The Atlanta–Fulton County Stadium in Atlanta, Georgia, hosted the Peach Bowl.
NC State Wolfpack	East Carolina Pirates
(9–2)	(10–1)
ACC	Independent
34	37
Head coach: Dick Sheridan	Head coach: Steve Logan
AP / Coaches; 21 / 21	AP / Coaches; 12 / 13
	1	2	3	4	Total
NC State	7	7	13	7	34
East Carolina	7	10	0	20	37
- Date: January 1, 1992
- Season: 1991
- Stadium: Atlanta–Fulton County Stadium
- Location: Atlanta, Georgia
- Referee: John Laurie (Big Eight)
- Attendance: 59,322

United States TV coverage
- Network: ESPN
- Announcers: Ron Franklin and Mike Gottfried

The 1992 Peach Bowl was an American college football bowl game that was played on January 1, 1992, at Atlanta–Fulton County Stadium in Atlanta, Georgia. The game matched the North Carolina State Wolfpack against the East Carolina Pirates. It was the final contest of the 1991 NCAA Division I-A football season for both teams, and ended in a 37–34 victory for the Pirates. This was the last edition of the Peach Bowl, as well as the last overall football game, played at Atlanta–Fulton County Stadium, as the game moved to the Georgia Dome in the following year.

== Teams ==
The game matched the North Carolina State Wolfpack of the Atlantic Coast Conference against the then-independent East Carolina Pirates in the first bowl game featuring those two teams. NC State was the runner-up of the ACC. The game represented the nineteenth matchup between the two teams; NC State led the series 12–6 heading into the game.

== Game summary ==
=== Scoring summary ===
Scoring summary

Quarter	Time	Drive			Team	Scoring information	Score	
Quarter	Time	Plays	Yards	TOP	Team	Scoring information	NC State	East Carolina
1					NC State	Gary Downs 2-yard touchdown run, Damon Hartman kick good	7	0
1					East Carolina	Cedric Van Buren 5-yard touchdown reception from Jeff Blake, Brenner kick good	7	7
2					NC State	Todd Harrison 4-yard touchdown reception from Terry Jordan, Hartman kick good	14	7
2					East Carolina	27-yard field goal by Brenner	14	10
2					East Carolina	Hunter Gallimore 55-yard touchdown reception from Blake, Brenner kick good	14	17
3					NC State	Robert Hinton 14-yard touchdown reception from Jordan, Hartman kick good	21	17
3					NC State	Greg Manior 1-yard touchdown run, kick no good (blocked)	27	17
4					NC State	Charles Davenport 52-yard touchdown reception from Ledel George, Hartman kick good	34	17
4					East Carolina	Blake 2-yard touchdown run, Brenner kick good	34	24
4					East Carolina	Dion Johnson 17-yard touchdown reception from Blake, 2-point run failed	34	30
4					East Carolina	Luke Fisher 22-yard touchdown reception from Blake, Brenner kick good	34	37
"TOP" = time of possession. For other American football terms, see Glossary of American football.							NC State	East Carolina

=== Statistics ===
Statistics	NCSU	ECU
First downs	20	24
Plays–yards	80-383	75–420
Rushes–yards	56-186	24–42
Passing yards	197	378
Passing: Comp–Att–Int	16-24-1	31–51–3
Time of possession	36:07	23:53

== See also ==
- East Carolina–NC State rivalry
