= 1991 Ball State Cardinals football team =

American college football season

1991 Ball State Cardinals football
- Conference: Mid-American Conference
- Record: 6–5 (4–4 MAC)
- Head coach: Paul Schudel (7th season)
- Offensive coordinator: Bill Lynch (2nd season)
- Home stadium: Ball State Stadium

1991 Mid-American Conference football standings
| | Conf. | | | | | Overall |
| Team | W | | L | | T | W | | L | | T |
|---|---|---|---|---|---|---|---|---|---|---|
| Bowling Green $ | 8 | – | 0 | – | 0 | 11 | – | 1 | – | 0 |
| Central Michigan | 3 | – | 1 | – | 4 | 6 | – | 1 | – | 4 |
| Miami (OH) | 4 | – | 3 | – | 1 | 6 | – | 4 | – | 1 |
| Toledo | 4 | – | 3 | – | 1 | 5 | – | 5 | – | 1 |
| Ball State | 4 | – | 4 | – | 0 | 6 | – | 5 | – | 0 |
| Western Michigan | 4 | – | 4 | – | 0 | 6 | – | 5 | – | 0 |
| Eastern Michigan | 3 | – | 4 | – | 1 | 3 | – | 7 | – | 1 |
| Ohio | 1 | – | 6 | – | 1 | 2 | – | 8 | – | 1 |
| Kent State | 1 | – | 7 | – | 0 | 1 | – | 10 | – | 0 |
$ – Conference champion

The 1991 Ball State Cardinals football team was an American football team that represented Ball State University in the Mid-American Conference (MAC) during the 1991 NCAA Division I-A football season. In its seventh season under head coach Paul Schudel, the team compiled a 6–5 record (4–4 against conference opponents) and finished in a tie for fifth place out of ten teams in the MAC. The team played its home games at Ball State Stadium in Muncie, Indiana.

The team's statistical leaders included Mike Neu with 1,491 passing yards, Corey Croom with 1,053 rushing yards and 48 points scored, Mike LeSure with 629 receiving yards.

== Schedule ==
| Date | Opponent | Site | Result | Attendance | Source |
|---|---|---|---|---|---|
| August 31 | at Miami (OH) | Yager Stadium; Oxford, OH | L 7–15 | | |
| September 7 | at Navy* | Navy–Marine Corps Memorial Stadium; Annapolis, MD | W 33–10 | 22,661 | |
| September 14 | at TCU* | Amon G. Carter Stadium; Fort Worth, TX | L 16–22 | 25,421 | |
| September 21 | Kent State | Ball State Stadium; Muncie, IN | W 28–27 | 13,121 | |
| September 28 | at Indiana State* | Memorial Stadium; Terre Haute, IN (Blue Key Victory Bell) | W 14–10 | 8,102 | |
| October 5 | Western Michigan | Ball State Stadium; Muncie, IN | L 16–25 | | |
| October 12 | at Eastern Michigan | Rynearson Stadium; Ypsilanti, MI | W 10–8 | | |
| October 26 | at Central Michigan | Kelly/Shorts Stadium; Mount Pleasant, MI | L 3–10 | 18,401 | |
| November 2 | Ohio | Ball State Stadium; Muncie, IN | W 10–6 | | |
| November 9 | at Toledo | Glass Bowl; Toledo, OH | W 9–3 | 14,670 | |
| November 16 | Bowling Green | Ball State Stadium; Muncie, IN | L 3–14 | | |
*Non-conference game
