= 1991 Penn State Nittany Lions football team =

American college football season

1991 Penn State Nittany Lions football

Eastern champion Fiesta Bowl champion

Fiesta Bowl, W 42–17 vs. Tennessee
- Conference: Independent

Ranking
- Coaches: No. 3
- AP: No. 3
- Record: 11–2
- Head coach: Joe Paterno (26th season)
- Offensive coordinator: Fran Ganter (8th season)
- Offensive scheme: Pro-style
- Defensive coordinator: Jerry Sandusky (15th season)
- Base defense: 4–3
- Captains: Mark D'Onofrio; Sam Gash; Keith Goganious; Al Golden; Darren Perry; Terry Smith
- Home stadium: Beaver Stadium

1991 NCAA Division I-A independents football records
	Conf.			Overall
Team	W	L	T	W		L		T
No. 9 East Carolina		–		11	–	1	–	0
No. 4 Florida State		–		11	–	2	–	0
No. 3 Penn State		–		11	–	2	–	0
No. 21 Tulsa		–		10	–	2	–	0
Louisiana Tech		–		8	–	1	–	2
No. 13 Notre Dame		–		10	–	3	–	0
Akron		–		5	–	6	–	0
Memphis State		–		5	–	6	–	0
Army		–		4	–	7	–	0
Cincinnati		–		4	–	7	–	0
Southern Miss		–		4	–	7	–	0
South Carolina		–		3	–	6	–	2
Southwestern Louisiana		–		2	–	8	–	1
Louisville		–		2	–	9	–	0
Northern Illinois		–		2	–	9	–	0
Tulane		–		1	–	10	–	0
Navy		–		1	–	10	–	0
Rankings from AP Poll

The 1991 Penn State Nittany Lions football team represented the Pennsylvania State University as an independent during the 1991 NCAA Division I-A football season. Led by 26th-year head coach Joe Paterno, the Nittany Lions compiled a record of 11–2. Penn State was invited to the Fiesta Bowl, where the Nittany Lions defeated Tennessee. The team played home games at Beaver Stadium in University Park, Pennsylvania.

== Schedule ==
Date	Time	Opponent	Rank	Site	TV	Result	Attendance	Source
August 28	9:00 p.m.	vs. No. 8 Georgia Tech	No. 7	Giants Stadium; East Rutherford, NJ (Kickoff Classic)	Raycom	W 34–22	77,409	
September 7	12:10 p.m.	Cincinnati	No. 5	Beaver Stadium; University Park, PA	Prime	W 81–0	94,000	
September 14	9:00 p.m.	at USC	No. 5	Los Angeles Memorial Coliseum; Los Angeles, CA	ABC	L 10–21	64,758	
September 21	8:00 p.m.	BYU	No. 12	Beaver Stadium; University Park, PA	ABC	W 33–7	96,304	
September 28	1:00 p.m.	Boston College	No. 10	Beaver Stadium; University Park, PA		W 28–21	95,927	
October 5	9:00 p.m.	at Temple	No. 12	Veterans Stadium; Philadelphia, PA		W 24–7	43,808	
October 12	12:10 p.m.	at No. 2 Miami (FL)	No. 9	Miami Orange Bowl; Miami, FL	ABC	L 20–26	75,723	
October 19	1:00 p.m.	Rutgers^{†}	No. 10	Beaver Stadium; University Park, PA		W 37–17	95,729	
October 26	4:00 p.m.	West Virginia	No. 8	Beaver Stadium; University Park, PA (rivalry)	ESPN	W 51–6	96,445	
November 9	1:30 p.m.	at Maryland	No. 9	Memorial Stadium; Baltimore, MD (rivalry)		W 47–7	57,416	
November 16	3:30 p.m.	No. 12 Notre Dame	No. 8	Beaver Stadium; University Park, PA (rivalry)	ABC	W 35–13	96,672	
November 28	11:15 a.m.	at Pittsburgh	No. 6	Pitt Stadium; Pittsburgh, PA (rivalry)	ABC	W 32–20	52,219	
January 1, 1992	4:30 p.m.	vs. No. 10 Tennessee	No. 6	Sun Devil Stadium; Tempe, AZ (Fiesta Bowl)	NBC	W 42–17	71,133	
^{†}Homecoming; Rankings from AP Poll released prior to the game; All times are in Eastern time; Source:

== Rankings ==
Ranking movements Legend: ██ Increase in ranking ██ Decrease in ranking т = Tied with team above or below
	Week															
Poll	Pre	1	2	3	4	5	6	7	8	9	10	11	12	13	14	Final
AP	7	5	5	12	10 т	12	9	10	8	8	9	8	7	6	6	3
Coaches	8	5	5	14	12	12	9	15	11	10	10	9	7	6	5	3

== Game summaries ==
=== BYU ===
- Gerry Collins 27 Rush, 99 Yds
- Penn State's defense sacked Ty Detmer six times and held BYU to single digits for first time since 1986

=== At Miami (FL) ===
#9 Penn State at #2 Miami (FL)

Team	1	2	3	4	Total
Nittany Lions	3	3	7	7	20
• Hurricanes	3	3	14	6	26

- Date: October 12
- Location: Miami Orange Bowl
- Game attendance: 75,723
- TV announcers (ABC): Keith Jackson, Bob Griese, Jack Arute

Scoring summary
Q1	8:36	MIA	Huerta 24-yard field goal	MIA 3–0
Q1	0:44	PSU	Fayak 20-yard field goal	Tie 3–3
Q2	5:20	PSU	Fayak 46-yard field goal	PSU 6–3
Q2	1:31	MIA	Huerta 45-yard field goal	Tie 6–6
Q3	6:34	MIA	Copeland 80-yard pass from Torretta (Huerta kick)	MIA 13–6
Q3		MIA	K. Williams 91-yard punt return (Huerta kick)	MIA 20–6
Q3		PSU	T. Smith 2-yard pass from Sacca (Fayak kick)	MIA 20–13
Q4	14:43	MIA	Thomas 42-yard pass from Torretta (kick failed)	MIA 26–13
Q4	9:35	PSU	T. Smith 9-yard pass from Sacca (Fayak kick)	MIA 26–20

- Fans watching on television outside of Florida missed two scores when the network switched to United States Supreme Court nominee Clarence Thomas testifying before the Senate Judiciary Committee

=== Vs. Tennessee (Fiesta Bowl) ===
#6 Penn State vs. #10 Tennessee

Team	1	2	3	4	Total
• Nittany Lions	7	0	14	21	42
Volunteers	10	0	7	0	17

- Date: January 1
- Location: Sun Devil Stadium, Tempe, Arizona
- Game attendance: 71,133
- TV announcers (NBC): Charlie Jones and Todd Christensen

== Roster ==
1991 Penn State Nittany Lions football team roster
Players
Coaches
Offense

Pos.	#	Name	Class
RB	20	Richie Anderson	Jr
OT	67	Todd Burger	Jr
RB	23	Gerry Collins	Sr
QB	12	Kerry Collins	Fr
TE	18	Troy Drayton	Jr
RB	11	Sam Gash	Sr
G	57	John Gerak	Jr
C	66	Greg Huntington	Jr
WR	24	O. J. McDuffie	Jr
OT	71	Todd Rucci	Jr
C		E. J. Sandusky	Sr
QB	17	John Sacca	Fr
QB	19	Tony Sacca	Sr
OT	76	Paul Siever	Sr
WR	30	Dan Skrip	Sr
WR	8	Terry Smith	Sr

Defense

Pos.	#	Name	Class
S	13	Matt Baggett	Sr
DT	55	Lou Benfatti	So
CB	3	Jeff Davis	Fr
LB	38	Mark D'Onofrio	Sr
LB	42	Keith Goganious	Sr
LB	58	Reggie Givens	Jr
CB	6	Leonard Humphries	Sr
DT	97	Tyoka Jackson	So
LB	99	Rich McKenzie	Jr
S	9	Darren Perry	Sr
DT	94	Eric Ravotti	Jr
CB	15	Frank Yeboah-Kodie	So

Special teams

Pos.	#	Name	Class
P	4	Doug Helkowski	Sr

Head coach

- Joe Paterno

Coordinators/assistant coaches

Legend

- (C) Team captain
- (S) Suspended
- (I) Ineligible
- Injured
- Redshirt

Roster

== NFL draft ==
Nine Nittany Lions were drafted in the 1992 NFL draft.

Round	Pick	Overall	Name	Position	Team
2nd	6	34	Mark D'Onofrio	Linebacker	Green Bay Packers
2nd	18	46	Tony Sacca	Quarterback	Phoenix Cardinals
3rd	18	74	Paul Siever	Offensive guard	Washington Redskins
3rd	27	83	Keith Goganious	Linebacker	Buffalo Bills
8th	7	203	Darren Perry	Free safety	Pittsburgh Steelers
8th	9	205	Sam Gash	Running back	New England Patriots
8th	13	209	Andre Powell	Linebacker	Miami Dolphins
8th	27	223	Leonard Humphries	Cornerback	Buffalo Bills
11th	28	308	Terry Smith	Wide receiver	Washington Redskins
