= 1991 Notre Dame Fighting Irish football team =

American college football season

1991 Notre Dame Fighting Irish football

Sugar Bowl champion

Sugar Bowl, W 39–28 vs. Florida
- Conference: Independent

Ranking
- Coaches: No. 12
- AP: No. 13
- Record: 10–3
- Head coach: Lou Holtz (6th season)
- Offensive coordinator: Tom Beck (1st season)
- Offensive scheme: Wishbone triple option
- Defensive coordinator: Gary Darnell (2nd season)
- Base defense: 4–3
- MVP: Jerome Bettis and Rick Mirer
- Captain: Rodney Culver
- Home stadium: Notre Dame Stadium

1991 NCAA Division I-A independents football records
	Conf.			Overall
Team	W	L	T	W		L		T
No. 9 East Carolina		–		11	–	1	–	0
No. 4 Florida State		–		11	–	2	–	0
No. 3 Penn State		–		11	–	2	–	0
No. 21 Tulsa		–		10	–	2	–	0
Louisiana Tech		–		8	–	1	–	2
No. 13 Notre Dame		–		10	–	3	–	0
Akron		–		5	–	6	–	0
Memphis State		–		5	–	6	–	0
Army		–		4	–	7	–	0
Cincinnati		–		4	–	7	–	0
Southern Miss		–		4	–	7	–	0
South Carolina		–		3	–	6	–	2
Southwestern Louisiana		–		2	–	8	–	1
Louisville		–		2	–	9	–	0
Northern Illinois		–		2	–	9	–	0
Tulane		–		1	–	10	–	0
Navy		–		1	–	10	–	0
Rankings from AP Poll

The 1991 Notre Dame Fighting Irish football team was an American football team that represented the University of Notre Dame as an independent during the 1991 NCAA Division I-A football season. In their sixth year under head coach Lou Holtz, the Irish compiled a 10–3 record, outscored opponents by a total of 426 to 261, and were ranked No. 13 in the final AP poll and No. 12 in the final UPI poll. After losing to No. 3 Michigan in week two, the Irish won seven straight games before losing in consecutive weeks to No. 13 Tennessee and No. 8 Penn State. They concluded the season with a victory over No 3 Florida in the Sugar Bowl.

Guard Mirko Jurkovic was a consensus first-team pick on the 1991 All-America college football team. Tight end Derek Brown and linebacker Demetrius DuBose also received first-team All-America honors from one or more selectors. The team's statistical leaders included quarterback Rick Mirer (2,117 passing yards), fullback Jerome Bettis (972 rushing yards), Tony Smith (42 receptions for 789 yards), and Demetrius DuBose (127 tackles).

The team played its home games at Notre Dame Stadium in Notre Dame, Indiana. On September 7, NBC started televising Notre Dame's home games, as the Irish became the first NCAA Division I-A program to have all of its home games televised exclusively by one television network.

== Schedule ==
Date	Time	Opponent	Rank	Site	TV	Result	Attendance	Source
September 7	1:30 p.m.	Indiana	No. 7	Notre Dame Stadium; Notre Dame, IN	NBC	W 49–27	59,075	
September 14	3:30 p.m.	at No. 3 Michigan	No. 7	Michigan Stadium; Ann Arbor, MI (rivalry)	ABC	L 14–24	106,138	
September 21	1:30 p.m.	Michigan State	No. 11	Notre Dame Stadium; Notre Dame, IN (rivalry)	NBC	W 49–10	59,075	
September 28	12:00 p.m.	at Purdue	No. 8	Ross–Ade Stadium; West Lafayette, IN (rivalry)	ABC	W 45–20	67,861	
October 5	11:00 p.m.	at Stanford	No. 8	Stanford Stadium; Stanford, CA (rivalry)	ESPN	W 42–26	70,798	
October 12	1:30 p.m.	No. 12 Pittsburgh	No. 7	Notre Dame Stadium; Notre Dame, IN (rivalry)	NBC	W 42–7	59,075	
October 19	8:30 p.m.	at Air Force	No. 5	Falcon Stadium; Colorado Springs, CO (rivalry)	ESPN	W 28–15	52,024	
October 26	1:30 p.m.	USC	No. 5	Notre Dame Stadium; Notre Dame, IN (rivalry)	NBC	W 24–20	59,075	
November 2	4:00 p.m.	Navy	No. 5	Notre Dame Stadium; Notre Dame, IN (rivalry)	NBC	W 38–0	59,075	
November 9	1:30 p.m.	No. 13 Tennessee	No. 5	Notre Dame Stadium; Notre Dame, IN	NBC	L 34–35	59,075	
November 16	3:30 p.m.	at No. 8 Penn State	No. 12	Beaver Stadium; University Park, PA (rivalry)	ABC	L 13–35	96,672	
November 30	11:00 p.m.	at Hawaii	No. 18	Aloha Stadium; Halawa, HI	ESPN	W 48–42	50,000	
January 1, 1992	8:00 p.m.	vs. No. 3 Florida	No. 18	Louisiana Superdome; New Orleans, LA (Sugar Bowl)	ABC	W 39–28	76,447	
Rankings from AP Poll released prior to the game; All times are in Eastern time; Source:

== Game summaries ==
=== Indiana ===
Team	1	2	3	4	Total
Hoosiers	3	14	3	7	27
• Fighting Irish	7	21	14	7	49

- Date: September 7
- Location: Notre Dame Stadium, South Bend, IN
- Game attendance: 59,075
- TV announcers (NBC): Dick Enberg, Bill Walsh, and John Dockery

Scoring summary
1	IND	Bonnell 48 yard field goal	IND 3–0
1	ND	DuBose 49 yard interception return (Hentrich kick)	ND 7–3
2	IND	Green 5 yard run (Bonnell kick)	IND 10–7
2	ND	Culver 19 yard run (Hentrich kick)	ND 14–10
2	IND	Green 1 yard run (Bonnell kick)	IND 17–14
2	ND	Mirer 46 yard run (Hentrich kick)	ND 21–17
2	ND	T. Brooks 13 yard run (Hentrich kick)	ND 28–17
3	IND	Bonnell 29 yard field goal	ND 28–20
3	ND	Mirer 6 yard run (Hentrich kick)	ND 35–20
3	ND	I. Smith 58 yard pass from Mirer (Hentrich kick)	ND 42–20
4	IND	Walker 5 yard pass from Green (Bonnell kick)	ND 42–27
4	ND	Mirer 1 yard run (Hentrich kick)	ND 49–27

Notre Dame rolled up 578 yards of offense, including Jerome Bettis's 11 Rush for 111 Yds. While IU answered with 418 yards of offense with Vaughn Dunbar rushing 161 yards on 33 rushes. This was Notre Dame's 14th consecutive victory over Big Ten teams.

=== At Michigan ===
Team	1	2	3	4	Total
Fighting Irish	0	7	7	0	14
• Wolverines	3	14	0	7	24

- Date: September 14
- Location: Michigan Stadium, Ann Arbor, MI
- TV announcers (ABC): Brent Musburger, Dick Vermeil, and Cheryl Miller

Scoring summary
1	10:54 remaining	MICH	Carlson 23 yard field goal	MICH 3–0
2	9:58 remaining	MICH	Howard 29 yard run (Carlson kick)	MICH 10–0
2	1:49 remaining	MICH	Powers 16 yard run (Carlson kick)	MICH 17–0
2	0:17 remaining	ND	Bettis 3 yard pass from Mirer (Hentrich kick)	MICH 17–7
3	6:47 remaining	ND	T. Smith 35 yard pass from Mirer (Hentrich kick)	MICH 17–14
4	9:02 remaining	MICH	Howard 25 yard pass from Grbac (Carlson kick)	MICH 24–14

The Irish fell behind 17–0 in Ann Arbor against the host Wolverines. They would battle back to make it a three-point game in the fourth quarter but the decisive play was a 25-yard "fade" from Elvis Grbac to Desmond Howard on fourth and one. Although Notre Dame kept the game close, it was an early indication of a shaky defense. Michigan dominated on the ground, rushing for 251 yards, while Grbac completed a record 20 passes in 22 attempts for 195 yards.

=== Tennessee ===
Coach Johnny Majors would tell his team, "I don't think there will ever be a bigger win as long as I live. This may be the greatest comeback in Tennessee history." Notre Dame would blow a 31–7 lead at home and lose by one point in front of a stunned crowd. The Irish had an opportunity to win it after the offense rallied and they drove down to Tennessee's nine-yard line with four seconds to play. But starting punter-kicker Craig Hentrich had injured his knee when UT blocked his kick at the end of the first half. The backup kicker would have his attempt blocked, ending the Irish's hopes of victory and effectively eliminating them from national-title contention.

=== Vs. Florida (Sugar Bowl) ===
Team	1	2	3	4	Total
• Fighting Irish	0	7	10	22	39
Gators	10	6	0	12	28

- Date: September 14
- Location: Louisiana Superdome, New Orleans, LA
- Game attendance: 76,447
- Game weather: Indoors
- TV announcers (ABC): Al Michaels, Frank Gifford, Dan Dierdorf

== Roster ==
1991 Notre Dame Fighting Irish football team roster
Players
Coaches
Offense

Pos.	#	Name	Class
FB	6	Jerome Bettis	So
RB	40	Tony Brooks	Jr
TE	86	Derek Brown	Sr
RB	5	Rodney Culver	Sr
WR	87	Lake Dawson	So
WR	10	Adrian Jarrell	Jr
OT	65	Lindsay Knapp	Jr
TE	80	Oscar McBride	So
C	76	Gene McGuire	Sr
QB	3	Rick Mirer	Jr
FB	15	Mike O'Neill	Sr
G	61	Tim Ruddy	So
TE	84	Irv Smith Sr.	Jr
G	75	Aaron Taylor	So

Defense

Pos.	#	Name	Class
LB	47	Pete Bercich	So
S	9	Jeff Burris	So
CB	13	Tom Carter	So
FS	32	Willie Clark	So
CB	29	John Covington	So
LB	31	Demetrius DuBose	Jr
LB	44	Jim Flanigan	So
DT	55	Oliver Gibson	So
FS	25	Mike Lalli	Jr
LB	89	Karmeeleyah McGill	Jr
LB	46	Brian Ratigan	Jr
CB	21	Rod Smith	Sr
DT	97	Bryant Young	So

Special teams

Pos.	#	Name	Class
P	28	Craig Hentrich	Jr

Head coach

- Lou Holtz

Coordinators/assistant coaches

- Tom Beck (offensive coordinator)
- Gary Darnell (defensive coordinator)
- Skip Holtz (wide receivers)
- Todd Monken (graduate assistant)

Legend

- (C) Team captain
- (S) Suspended
- (I) Ineligible
- Injured
- Redshirt

== Awards and honors ==
Senior offensive guard Mirko Jurkovic received first-team All-America honors from the Walter Camp Football Foundation (WCFF), College & Pro Football Newsweekly, and Football News. He also won the team award as the Lineman of the Year.

Senior tight end Derek Brown received first-team All-America honors from the WCFF and was selected to play in the Hula Bowl and the East-West Shrine game.

Junior inside linebacker received first-team All-America honors from Football News. He was also a semifinalist for the Butkus Award.

Junior quarterback Rick Mirer was selected as the team's co-most valuable player. He was also a semifinalist for the Football News Offensive Player of the Year award.

Sophomore fullback Jerome Bettis received second-team All-America honors from Football News and College & Pro Football Newsweekly. He was also the most valuable player of the Sugar Bowl and was selected as the team's co-most valuable player.
