= 1991 Central Michigan Chippewas football team =

American college football season

1991 Central Michigan Chippewas football
- Conference: Mid-American Conference
- Record: 6–1–4 (3–1–4 MAC)
- Head coach: Herb Deromedi (14th season)
- Offensive coordinator: Tom Kearly (1st season)
- MVP: Billy Smith
- Home stadium: Kelly/Shorts Stadium

1991 Mid-American Conference football standings
	Conf.					Overall
Team	W		L		T	W		L		T
Bowling Green $	8	–	0	–	0	11	–	1	–	0
Central Michigan	3	–	1	–	4	6	–	1	–	4
Miami (OH)	4	–	3	–	1	6	–	4	–	1
Toledo	4	–	3	–	1	5	–	5	–	1
Ball State	4	–	4	–	0	6	–	5	–	0
Western Michigan	4	–	4	–	0	6	–	5	–	0
Eastern Michigan	3	–	4	–	1	3	–	7	–	1
Ohio	1	–	6	–	1	2	–	8	–	1
Kent State	1	–	7	–	0	1	–	10	–	0
$ – Conference champion

The 1991 Central Michigan Chippewas football team represented Central Michigan University in the Mid-American Conference (MAC) during the 1991 NCAA Division I-A football season. In their 14th season under head coach Herb Deromedi, the Chippewas compiled a 6–1–4 record (3–1–4 against MAC opponents), finished in second place in the MAC, and outscored their opponents, 205 to 157. The team's four ties is tied for the NCAA record for most ties in a season. The team played its home games in Kelly/Shorts Stadium in Mount Pleasant, Michigan, with attendance of 96,700 in five home games.

The highlight of the season was a 20–3 victory over No. 18 ranked Michigan State at Spartan Stadium on September 14, 1991. Michigan State had been favored by 21-1/2 points, and coach Deromedi called it the biggest win in school history. On the opening drive, Michigan State quickly took the ball to the goal line. On fourth down from the one-yard line, Michigan State opted to go for the touchdown rather than kick a field goal. Chippewa linebacker Doug Adler stopped Tico Duckett for no gain, and the goal-line stand was reported to be an inspirational moment for the Chippewas. Adler called the top "the biggest play I ever made." Later in the first quarter, Central Michigan tailback Billy Smith scored on a 15-yard run. The Chippewas expanded their lead in the second quarter on a 57-yard touchdown pass from Jeff Bender to Ken Ealy and led 14–3 at halftime. Chuck Selinger also kicked two field goals in the second half for Central Michigan. Billy Smith rushed for 162 yards on 40 carries in the game.

The team's statistical leaders included quarterback Jeff Bender with 1,754 passing yards, tailback Billy Smith with 1,440 rushing yards, and flanker Ken Ealy with 724 receiving yards. Smith's 374 rushing attempts in 1991 remains a single season record at Central Michigan, and his 1,440 rushing yards was the third highest single season total in school history up to that time. Smith received the team's most valuable player award and was selected as a first-team All-MAC player. Other Central Michigan players to receive first-team All-MAC honors were offensive tackle Jim Wyatt and defensive tackle Mike Nettie. Nettie had nine sacks in 1991, which was at the time tied for the school's single season record.

== Schedule ==
Date	Time	Opponent	Site	Result	Attendance	Source
August 31		at Ohio	Peden Stadium; Athens, OH	T 17–17		
September 7		Southwestern Louisiana*	Kelly/Shorts Stadium; Mount Pleasant, MI	W 27–24	17,116	
September 14	1:05 p.m.	at No. 18 Michigan State*	Spartan Stadium; East Lansing, MI	W 20–3	71,629	
September 21		Akron*	Kelly/Shorts Stadium; Mount Pleasant, MI	W 31–29	21,841	
September 28		at Toledo	Glass Bowl; Toledo, OH	T 16–16		
October 5		at Bowling Green	Doyt Perry Stadium; Bowling Green, OH	L 10–17		
October 12		Miami (OH)	Kelly/Shorts Stadium; Mount Pleasant, MI	T 10–10		
October 19		at Kent State	Dix Stadium; Kent, OH	W 23–7		
October 26		Ball State^{†}	Kelly/Shorts Stadium; Mount Pleasant, MI	W 10–3	18,401	
November 2		at Eastern Michigan	Rynearson Stadium; Ypsilanti, MI (rivalry)	T 14–14		
November 16		Western Michigan	Kelly/Shorts Stadium; Mount Pleasant, MI (rivalry)	W 27–17		
*Non-conference game; ^{†}Homecoming; Rankings from AP Poll released prior to the game; All times are in Eastern time
