= 1991 Eastern Michigan Eagles football team =

American college football season

1991 Eastern Michigan Eagles football
- Conference: Mid-American Conference
- Record: 3–7–1 (3–4–1 MAC)
- Head coach: Jim Harkema (9th season)
- Offensive coordinator: Bill Schmitz (1st season)
- Captain: Game captains
- Home stadium: Rynearson Stadium

1991 Mid-American Conference football standings
	Conf.					Overall
Team	W		L		T	W		L		T
Bowling Green $	8	–	0	–	0	11	–	1	–	0
Central Michigan	3	–	1	–	4	6	–	1	–	4
Miami (OH)	4	–	3	–	1	6	–	4	–	1
Toledo	4	–	3	–	1	5	–	5	–	1
Ball State	4	–	4	–	0	6	–	5	–	0
Western Michigan	4	–	4	–	0	6	–	5	–	0
Eastern Michigan	3	–	4	–	1	3	–	7	–	1
Ohio	1	–	6	–	1	2	–	8	–	1
Kent State	1	–	7	–	0	1	–	10	–	0
$ – Conference champion

The 1991 Eastern Michigan Eagles football team represented Eastern Michigan University in the 1991 NCAA Division I-A football season. In their ninth season under head coach Jim Harkema, the Eagles compiled a 3–7–1 record (3–4–1 against conference opponents), finished in seventh place in the Mid-American Conference, and were outscored by their opponents, 232 to 144. The team lost to two Big Ten Conference opponents, Purdue (3–49) and Wisconsin (6–21). The team's statistical leaders included Kwame McKinnon with 849 passing yards, Cameron Moss with 452 rushing yards, and Jon Pfeifer with 241 receiving yards.

== Schedule ==
Date	Time	Opponent	Site	Result	Attendance	Source
August 31		at Bowling Green	Doyt Perry Stadium; Bowling Green, OH	L 6–17		
September 7	1:00 p.m.	at Purdue*	Ross–Ade Stadium; West Lafayette, IN	L 3–49	37,911	
September 14		at Miami (OH)	Yager Stadium; Oxford, OH	L 3–29		
September 21		Louisiana Tech*	Rynearson Stadium; Ypsilanti, MI	L 14–17	13,941	
September 28	2:05 p.m.	at Wisconsin*	Camp Randall Stadium; Madison, WI	L 6–21	45,365	
October 5		at Kent State	Dix Stadium; Kent, OH	W 21–20	8,000	
October 12		Ball State	Rynearson Stadium; Ypsilanti, MI	L 8–10		
October 19		Western Michigan	Rynearson Stadium; Ypsilanti, MI	W 42–24		
November 2		Central Michigan	Rynearson Stadium; Ypsilanti, MI (rivalry)	T 14–14		
November 9		at Ohio	Peden Stadium; Athens, OH	W 13–10		
November 16		Toledo	Rynearson Stadium; Ypsilanti, MI	L 14–21	5,116	
*Non-conference game; All times are in Eastern time

== Personnel ==
1991 Eastern Michigan Eagles football team roster
Players
Coaches
Offense

Pos.	#	Name	Class
QB		Kwame McKinnon	Fr

Defense

Pos.	#	Name	Class
	30	Cazzie Nelson
	5	Ronald Rice

Special teams

Pos.	#	Name	Class
K		Jim Langeloh

Head coach

- Jim Harkema

Coordinators/assistant coaches

Legend

- (C) Team captain
- (S) Suspended
- (I) Ineligible
- Injured
- Redshirt
