= Jason Peirce =

American actor (born 1972)

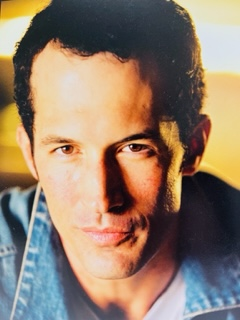
Jason Peirce

Jason Peirce (born October 15, 1972) is an American stage, film and television actor. Peirce began his career as a model and stuntman. He's best known for his portrayal of "Detective Sid Pearce" on L.A. Dragnet (2003-2004), as well as the role of "Tommy" on the hit television show Providence (1999–2002). Peirce also played "Tim Hofferman" on The King of Queens. (1998–2007). Peirce studied at the widely renowned Beverly Hills Playhouse.

Peirce was born in Hyannis, Massachusetts, and grew up in Texas, Massachusetts, and Florida. Actor Burt Reynolds recruited Peirce out of Satellite High School in Satellite Beach, Florida, to play college football for the legendary head coach Bobby Bowden at Florida State University. Peirce was a member of Bowden’s 1989 No. 1 ranked recruiting class, which paved the way for the Seminoles' 1993 National Championship season.

Peirce was a reporter and host for Calabasas TV. Peirce was also a commissioner for the City of Calabasas (2008–2012). He holds a BA in Literature from Florida State, an MPS in Economic Development from Penn State, and attended Sant Barbara College of Law.

Jason Peirce resides in Santa Barbara, California.
