= Frank Kmet =

American football player (born 1970)

No. 73, 71, 94
- Position: Defensive end

Personal information
- Born: March 13, 1970 (age 56)
- Listed height: 6 ft 4 in (1.93 m)
- Listed weight: 289 lb (131 kg)

Career information
- High school: John Hersey (Arlington Heights, Illinois)
- College: Purdue
- NFL draft: 1992: 4th round, 111th overall pick

Career history
- Buffalo Bills (1992)*; Green Bay Packers (1992)*; Cleveland Browns (1992)*; Chicago Bears (1993–1995)*; Buffalo Bills (1996)*; Green Bay Packers (1996)*
- * Offseason or practice squad member only

Frank Scott Kmet (born March 13, 1970) is an American former football defensive end in the National Football League (NFL). He played college football at Purdue and went to high school at John Hersey High School in Arlington Heights, Illinois.

Kmet was drafted by the Buffalo Bills in the fourth round of the 1992 NFL draft. Although he also spent time with the Green Bay Packers, Cleveland Browns, and Chicago Bears, he never played a game in the NFL.

== Early life and family ==
Kmet was a star athlete in football and wrestling at John Hersey High School in Arlington Heights, Illinois. He was diagnosed with diabetes during his sophomore year of high school.

He was named all-state by the Chicago Tribune during his senior year. Kmet committed to Purdue University as part of the second-ranked recruiting class in the nation.

== College years ==
As a freshman at Purdue in 1988, he was the backup left end. In 1990, he received an honorable mention for All-Big Ten Conference after recording 12 tackles-for-loss (fifth most in the conference) and 95 tackles (fourth most on the team). For his senior year in 1991 under new head coach Jim Colletto's 5–2 defense, he switched to defensive tackle and was named a team captain. However, in October, he broke his leg in the 28–7 win over Wisconsin, ending his college career.

== Professional career ==
Pre-draft measurables
Height	Weight	Bench press
6 ft 3 7/8 in (1.93 m)	289 lb (131 kg)	26 reps
All values from NFL Combine

Kmet's recovery from his leg injury saw him begin walking again in January 1992 before it fully healed a month later, though he continued to feel discomfort in the leg until spring. He attended the NFL Scouting Combine in February, but was restricted to the bench press and measurements.

Projected by Mel Kiper Jr. as a sixth-round selection in the 1992 NFL draft, Kmet participated in pre-draft workouts with the Atlanta Falcons, Cleveland Browns, New York Giants and Jets, and Philadelphia Eagles. He was drafted 111th overall in the fourth round by the Buffalo Bills, but was released on August 25.

Kmet was claimed by the Green Bay Packers two days after his release by Buffalo, only to be cut again on August 31. He spent two weeks on the Browns' practice squad before being waived on September 17.

Kmet signed with the Chicago Bears in 1993; head coach Dave Wannstedt praised him in May minicamp, describing him as "doing a nice job. He was a fourth-round draft pick and he hurt his leg. He's up to about 290 pounds and I think he'll be in the mix." He was waived on August 30 and assigned to the Bears' practice squad for the regular season.

Kmet returned to the Bears in 1994 and converted to offensive line as a guard. His final seasons with the team saw him get signed in the spring and released in August. The 1995 offseason, during which he played guard and center, was also marred by an infected finger that placed him on the injury report. During his tenure in Chicago, he attracted notoriety from his teammates for his pranks; such antics included pouring buckets of water on players in their dormitories, applying Vaseline to chinstraps, and itching powder to shorts.

Summer 1996 saw him switch back to defense as part of return stints with the Bills and Packers, both of which ended prior to the regular season, before he concluded his playing career. The following year, Kmet and Bears defensive tackle Jim Flanigan established Timeout, a monthly newspaper covering Chicago-area high school sports.

== Personal life ==
Kmet is the father of current Chicago Bears tight end Cole Kmet.
