= John Kacherski =

American football player (born 1967)

No. 55
- Position: Linebacker

Personal information
- Born: June 27, 1967 (age 59); Oceanside, New York, U.S.
- Listed height: 6 ft 2 in (1.88 m)
- Listed weight: 240 lb (109 kg)

Career information
- High school: Riverhead (NY); Milford Academy (CT)
- College: Ohio State
- NFL draft: 1992: undrafted

Career history
- Denver Broncos (1992)
- Stats at Pro Football Reference

John Kacherski (born June 27, 1967) is an American former professional football player who was a linebacker for the Denver Broncos of the National Football League (NFL) in 1992. He played college football for the Ohio State Buckeyes.
