= Tony Lowery (American football) =

American football player (born 1969)

Profile
- Position: Quarterback

Personal information
- Born: July 13, 1969 (age 57)
- Listed height: 6 ft 3 in (1.91 m)
- Listed weight: 200 lb (91 kg)

Career information
- High school: Groveport Madison (Groveport, Ohio)
- College: Wisconsin (1987–1991)
- NFL draft: 1992: undrafted

Career history
- Cleveland Thunderbolts (1994); Las Vegas Sting (1995)

Awards and highlights
- Big Ten Freshman of the Year (1987)

Career AFL statistics
- Comp. / Att.: 79 / 149
- Passing yards: 958
- TD–INT: 18–6
- Passer rating: 86.48
- Rushing TDs: 2
- Stats at ArenaFan.com

Tony Lowery (born July 13, 1969) is an American former professional football quarterback who played two seasons in the Arena Football League (AFL) with the Cleveland Thunderbolts and Las Vegas Sting. He played college football at the University of Wisconsin.

== Early life ==
Tony Lowery was born on July 13, 1969. He attended Groveport Madison High School in Groveport, Ohio. He earned all-state honors in both basketball and football in high school.

== College career ==
Lowery accepted a football scholarship from the University of Wisconsin over a basketball scholarship from Ohio University. He completed 42 of 89 passes (47.2%) for 572 yards, two touchdowns, and four interceptions in 1987 while also rushing for 279 yards and one touchdown. He earned Big Ten Freshman of the Year honors. In 1988, Lowery recorded 67 completions on 121 passing attempts (55.4%) for 712 yards, one touchdown, and eight interceptions. He had knee issues during the 1988 season. In March 1989, he quit the football team to attempt a college basketball career. However, Lowery did not end up playing basketball anywhere and then returned to the Wisconsin football team in 1990. He completed 159 of 280 passes (56.8%) for 1,757 yards, five touchdowns, and 13 interceptions. As a senior in 1991, he totaled 87 completions on 158 attempts (55.1%) for 965 yards, six touchdowns, and seven interceptions while also scoring two rushing touchdowns.

== Professional career ==
Lowery played in seven games for the Cleveland Thunderbolts of the Arena Football League (AFL) in 1994, completing 69 of 127 passes (54.3%) for 811 yards, 17 touchdowns, and six interceptions while also rushing nine times for 23 yards and one touchdown.

He appeared in all 12 games for the Las Vegas Sting of the AFL during the 1995 season, recording ten completions on 22 attempts (45.5%) for 147 yards and one touchdown, and four rushes for 11 yards and one touchdown.
