= 1992 NFL draft =

National Football League Draft

General information
- Date: April 26–27, 1992
- Location: Marriott Marquis in New York City, New York
- Network: ESPN

Overview
- 336 total selections in 12 rounds
- League: National Football League
- First selection: Steve Emtman, DT; Indianapolis Colts
- Mr. Irrelevant: Matt Elliott, OT; Washington Redskins
- Most selections (17): New England Patriots
- Fewest selections (7): Detroit Lions
- Hall of Famers: none

The 1992 NFL draft was the procedure by which National Football League teams selected amateur college football players. It is officially known as the NFL Annual Player Selection Meeting. The draft was held April 26–27, 1992, at the Marriott Marquis in New York City, New York. The league also held a supplemental draft after the regular draft and before the regular season.

The 1992 draft was notable because for the first time since 1958 one team, the Indianapolis Colts, held the first two overall picks, selecting defensive end Steve Emtman and then linebacker Quentin Coryatt. Neither made a major impact in the league, and the 1992 draft in retrospect is considered one of the worst in league history. It is the third draft following 1984 and 1943 to produce no Pro Football Hall of Famers. It was also the final NFL draft featuring 12 rounds of selections; the league would reduce the rounds to eight the following season, and then seven the year after that, where it has remained since.

== Player selections ==
*	Compensatory selection
†	Pro Bowler
‡	Hall of Famer

Positions key
Offense	Defense	Special teams
QB — Quarterback; RB — Running back; FB — Fullback; WR — Wide receiver; TE — Tight end; OL — Offensive lineman; T — Tackle; G — Guard; C — Center	DL — Defensive lineman; DT — Defensive tackle (Note: Includes nose tackle (NT)); DE — Defensive end; EDGE — Edge rusher; LB — Linebacker (Note: Includes middle linebacker (MLB/MIKE), weakside linebacker (WILL), strongside linebacker (SAM), off-ball linebacker, and outside linebacker (OLB)); DB — Defensive back; CB — Cornerback; S — Safety (Note: Includes free safety (FS) and strong safety (SS))	K — Kicker (Note: Also known as a placekicker (PK)); P — Punter; LS — Long snapper; RS — Return specialist (Note: Includes kickoff and punt returners)

Rnd.	Pick	Team	Player	Pos.	College	Notes
1	1	Indianapolis Colts	Steve Emtman	DE	Washington	
1	2	Indianapolis Colts	Quentin Coryatt	LB	Texas A&M	from Tampa Bay (Note: No. 2: Tampa Bay → Indianapolis (PD). Tampa Bay traded a first-round selection (2nd overall) to Indianapolis in exchange for QB Chris Chandler.)
1	3	Los Angeles Rams	Sean Gilbert ^{†}	DT	Pittsburgh	
1	4	Washington Redskins	Desmond Howard ^{†}	WR	Michigan	from Cincinnati (Note: No. 4: Cincinnati → Washington (D). Cincinnati traded first- and third-round selections (4th and 58th overall) to Washington in exchange for two first-round selections and a third-round selection (6th, 28th and 84th overall).)
1	5	Green Bay Packers	Terrell Buckley	CB	Florida State	
1	6	Cincinnati Bengals	David Klingler	QB	Houston	from San Diego via Washington (Note: No. 6: San Diego → Washington → Cincinnati. Multiple trades: San Diego → Washington (PD). San Diego traded a first-round selection (6th overall) to Washington in exchange for a fifth-round selection (140th overall) and a 1991 second-round selection. Washington → Cincinnati (D). See Round 1: Cincinnati → Washington)
1	7	Miami Dolphins	Troy Vincent ^{†}	CB	Wisconsin	from Phoenix (Note: No. 7: Phoenix → Miami (PD). Phoenix traded a first-round selection (7th overall) to Miami in exchange for WR Randal Hill.)
1	8	Atlanta Falcons	Bob Whitfield ^{†}	T	Stanford	from New England (Note: No. 8: New England → Atlanta (D). New England traded a first-round selection (8th overall) to Atlanta in exchange for first-, second- and fourth-round selections (19th, 46th and 104th overall).)
1	9	Cleveland Browns	Tommy Vardell	FB	Stanford	
1	10	Seattle Seahawks	Ray Roberts	T	Virginia	
1	11	Pittsburgh Steelers	Leon Searcy ^{†}	T	Miami (FL)	
1	12	Miami Dolphins	Marco Coleman ^{†}	LB	Georgia Tech	
1	13	New England Patriots	Eugene Chung	T	Virginia Tech	from Minnesota via Dallas (Note: No. 13: Minnesota → Dallas → New England. Multiple trades: Minnesota → Dallas (PD). Minnesota traded first-, second- and third-round selections (13th, 40th and 71st overall), 1990 first-, second- and sixth-round selections, 1991 first- and second-round selections, LB Jesse Solomon, LB David Howard, CB Issiac Holt and DE Alex Stewart to Dallas in exchange for 1990 third-, fifth- and tenth-round selections, a 1991 third-round selection and RB Herschel Walker. Dallas → New England (D). Dallas traded first- and third-round selections (13th and 71st overall) to New England in exchange for first-, second- and fourth-round selections (19th, 37th and 104th overall).)
1	14	New York Giants	Derek Brown	TE	Notre Dame	
1	15	New York Jets	Johnny Mitchell	TE	Nebraska	
1	16	Los Angeles Raiders	Chester McGlockton ^{†}	DT	Clemson	
1	17	Dallas Cowboys	Kevin Smith	CB	Texas A&M	from Philadelphia via Green Bay and Atlanta (Note: No. 17: Philadelphia → Green Bay → Atlanta → Dallas. Multiple trades: Philadelphia → Green Bay (PD). Philadelphia traded a first-round selection (17th overall) and a 1991 first-round selection to Green Bay in exchange for a 1991 first-round selection. Green Bay → Atlanta (PD). Green Bay traded a first-round selection (17th overall) to Atlanta in exchange for QB Brett Favre. Atlanta → Dallas (D). Atlanta traded first- and fifth-round selections (17th and 120th overall) to Dallas in exchange for first- and fourth-round selections (19th and 104th overall).)
1	18	San Francisco 49ers	Dana Hall	S	Washington	
1	19	Atlanta Falcons	Tony Smith	RB	Southern Miss	from Atlanta via New England and Dallas (Note: No. 19: Atlanta → New England → Dallas → Atlanta. Multiple trades: Atlanta → New England (D). See Round 1: New England → Atlanta. New England → Dallas (D). See Round 1: Dallas → New England. Dallas → Atlanta (D). See Round 1: Atlanta → Dallas)
1	20	Kansas City Chiefs	Dale Carter ^{†}	CB	Tennessee	
1	21	New Orleans Saints	Vaughn Dunbar	RB	Indiana	
1	22	Chicago Bears	Alonzo Spellman	DE	Ohio State	
1	23	San Diego Chargers	Chris Mims	DE	Tennessee	from Houston (Note: No. 23: Houston → San Diego (PD). Houston traded a first-round selection (23rd overall) to San Diego in exchange for DL Lee Williams.)
1	24	Dallas Cowboys	Robert Jones	LB	East Carolina	
1	25	Denver Broncos	Tommy Maddox	QB	UCLA	
1	26	Detroit Lions	Robert Porcher ^{†}	DE	South Carolina State	
1	27	Buffalo Bills	John Fina	T	Arizona	
1	28	Cincinnati Bengals	Darryl Williams ^{†}	S	Miami (FL)	from Washington (Note: No. 28: Washington → Cincinnati (D). See Round 1: Cincinnati → Washington.)
2	29	Indianapolis Colts	Ashley Ambrose ^{†}	CB	Mississippi Valley State	
2	30	Los Angeles Rams	Steve Israel	CB	Pittsburgh	
2	31	Cincinnati Bengals	Carl Pickens ^{†}	WR	Tennessee	
2	32	Los Angeles Raiders	Greg Skrepenak	T	Michigan	from Tampa Bay (Note: No. 32: Tampa Bay → LA Raiders (D). Tampa Bay traded a second-round selection (32nd overall) to the LA Raiders in exchange for second-, third- and seventh-round selections (44th, 72nd and 184th overall).)
2	33	San Diego Chargers	Marquez Pope	CB	Fresno State	
2	34	Green Bay Packers	Mark D'Onofrio	LB	Penn State	
2	35	New England Patriots	Rod Smith ^{†}	CB	Notre Dame	from Phoenix (Note: No. 35: Phoenix → New England (D). Phoenix traded a second-round selection (35th overall) to New England in exchange for second- and fourth-round selections (46th and 100th overall).)
2	36	Dallas Cowboys	Jimmy Smith ^{†}	WR	Jackson State	from Cleveland (Note: No. 36: Cleveland → Dallas (D). Cleveland traded second- and fifth-round selections (36th and 121st overall) to Dallas in exchange for second-, third-, sixth-, eighth- and twelfth-round selections (52nd, 78th, 163rd, 222nd and 329th overall).)
2	37	Dallas Cowboys	Darren Woodson ^{†}	S	Arizona State	from New England (Note: No. 37: New England → Dallas (D). See Round 1: Dallas → New England.)
2	38	Pittsburgh Steelers	Levon Kirkland ^{†}	LB	Clemson	
2	39	Minnesota Vikings	Robert Harris	DE	Southern	from Seattle (Note: No. 39: Seattle → Minnesota (D). Seattle traded a second-round selection (39th overall) and a 1993 third-round selection to Minnesota in exchange for DT Keith Millard.)
2	40	Kansas City Chiefs	Matt Blundin	QB	Virginia	from Minnesota via Dallas (Note: No. 40: Minnesota → Dallas → Kansas City. Multiple trades: Minnesota → Dallas (PD). See Round 1: Minnesota → Dallas. Dallas → Kansas City (D). Dallas traded a second-round selection (40th overall) to Kansas City in exchange for second- and third-round selections (47th and 74th overall).)
2	41	New York Giants	Phillippi Sparks	CB	Arizona State	
2	42	New York Jets	Kurt Barber	LB	USC	
2	43	Miami Dolphins	Eddie Blake	DT	Auburn	
2	44	Tampa Bay Buccaneers	Courtney Hawkins	WR	Michigan State	from LA Raiders (Note: No. 44: LA Raiders → Tampa Bay (D). See Round 2: Tampa Bay → LA Raiders.)
2	45	San Francisco 49ers	Amp Lee	RB	Florida State	from San Francisco via Green Bay (Note: No. 45: San Francisco → Green Bay → San Francisco. Multiple trades: San Francisco → Green Bay (PD). San Francisco traded a second-round selection (45th overall) to Green Bay in exchange for LB Tim Harris. Green Bay → San Francisco (PD). Green Bay sent a second-round selection (45th overall) to San Francisco as compensation for signing 49ers defensive coordinator Mike Holmgren as head coach.)
2	46	Phoenix Cardinals	Tony Sacca	QB	Penn State	from Atlanta via New England (Note: No. 46: Atlanta → New England → Phoenix. Multiple trades: Atlanta → New England (D). See Round 1: New England → Atlanta. New England → Phoenix (D). See Round 2: Phoenix → New England)
2	47	Washington Redskins	Shane Collins	DE	Arizona State	from Kansas City via Dallas (Note: No. 47: Kansas City → Dallas → Washington. Multiple trades: Kansas City → Dallas (D). See Round 2: Dallas → Kansas City. Dallas → Washington (D). Dallas traded second- and third-round selections (47th and 74th overall) to Washington in exchange for second- and third-round selections (56th and 58th overall).)
2	48	Philadelphia Eagles	Siran Stacy	RB	Alabama	
2	49	Chicago Bears	Troy Auzenne	T	California	
2	50	Houston Oilers	Eddie Robinson	LB	Alabama State	
2	51	Atlanta Falcons	Chuck Smith	DE	Tennessee	from Dallas (Note: No. 51: Dallas → Atlanta (PD). Dallas traded a second-round selection and a conditional eighth-round selection (51st and 217th overall) to Atlanta in exchange for DT Tony Casillas; the eighth-round selection would have been upgraded to the sixth round if Casillas had played at least 75% of Dallas' offensive snaps in 1991.)
2	52	Cleveland Browns	Patrick Rowe	WR	San Diego State	from New Orleans via Dallas (Note: No. 52: New Orleans → Dallas → Cleveland. Multiple trades: New Orleans → Dallas (PD). New Orleans traded a second-round selection (52nd overall), and 1991 first- and third-round selections to Dallas in exchange for QB Steve Walsh. Dallas → Cleveland (D). See Round 2: Cleveland → Dallas)
2	53	Detroit Lions	Tracy Scroggins	LB	Tulsa	
2	54	Denver Broncos	Shane Dronett	DE	Texas	
2	55	Buffalo Bills	James Patton	DT	Texas	
2	56	Detroit Lions	Jason Hanson ^{†}	K	Washington State	from Washington via Dallas (Note: No. 56: Washington → Dallas → Detroit. Multiple trades: Washington → Dallas (PD). See Round 2: Dallas → Washington. Dallas → Detroit (D). Dallas traded a second-round selection (56th overall) to Detroit in exchange for third-, fourth- and ninth-round selections (82nd, 109th and 250th overall).)
3	57	Los Angeles Rams	Marc Boutte	DT	LSU	from Indianapolis (Note: No. 57: Indianapolis → LA Rams (PD). Indianapolis traded third- and eleventh-round selections (57th and 281st overall) to the LA Rams in exchange for OT Irv Pankey.)
3	58	Dallas Cowboys	Clayton Holmes	CB	Carson–Newman	from Cincinnati via Washington (Note: No. 58: Cincinnati → Washington → Dallas. Multiple trades: Cincinnati → Washington (D). See Round 1: Cincinnati → Washington. Washington → Dallas (D). See Round 2: Dallas → Washington)
3	59	Tampa Bay Buccaneers	Mark Wheeler	DT	Texas A&M	
3	60	Los Angeles Rams	Todd Kinchen	WR	LSU	
3	61	Phoenix Cardinals	Ed Cunningham	C	Washington	
3	62	Green Bay Packers	Robert Brooks	WR	South Carolina	
3	63	San Diego Chargers	Ray Ethridge	WR	Pasadena City College	
3	64	New England Patriots	Todd Collins	LB	Carson–Newman	
3	65	Cleveland Browns	Bill Johnson	DT	Michigan State	
3	66	Seattle Seahawks	Bob Spitulski	LB	Central Florida	
3	67	Pittsburgh Steelers	Joel Steed ^{†}	DT	Colorado	
3	68	New York Jets	Siupeli Malamala	T	Washington	
3	69	New York Giants	Aaron Pierce	TE	Washington	
3	70	Miami Dolphins	Larry Webster	DT	Maryland	
3	71	New England Patriots	Kevin Turner	FB	Alabama	from Minnesota via Dallas (Note: No. 71: Minnesota → Dallas → New England. Multiple trades: Minnesota → Dallas (PD). See Round 1: Minnesota → Dallas. Dallas → New England (D). See Round 1: Dallas → New England.)
3	72	New Orleans Saints	Tyrone Legette	CB	Nebraska	from LA Raiders via Tampa Bay (Note: No. 72: LA Raiders → Tampa Bay → New Orleans. Multiple trades: LA Raiders → Tampa Bay (D). See Round 2: Tampa Bay → LA Raiders. Tampa Bay → New Orleans (D). Tampa Bay traded a third-round selection (72nd overall) to New Orleans in exchange for third- and fifth-round selections (79th and 118th overall).)
3	73	Atlanta Falcons	Howard Dinkins	LB	Florida State	
3	74	Washington Redskins	Paul Siever	G	Penn State	from Kansas City via Dallas (Note: No. 74: Kansas City → Dallas → Washington. Multiple trades: Kansas City → Dallas (D). See Round 2: Dallas → Kansas City. Dallas → Washington (D). See Round 2: Dallas → Washington.)
3	75	Philadelphia Eagles	Tommy Jeter	DT	Texas	
3	76	San Francisco 49ers	Brian Bollinger	G	North Carolina	
3	77	Houston Oilers	Corey Harris	WR	Vanderbilt	
3	78	Cleveland Browns	Gerald Dixon	LB	South Carolina	from Dallas (Note: No. 78: Dallas → Cleveland (D). See Round 2: Cleveland → Dallas.)
3	79	Tampa Bay Buccaneers	Tyji Armstrong	TE	Mississippi	from New Orleans (Note: No. 79: New Orleans → Tampa Bay (D). See Round 3: Tampa Bay → New Orleans.)
3	80	Chicago Bears	Jeremy Lincoln	CB	Tennessee	
3	81	Detroit Lions	Thomas McLemore	TE	Southern	from Denver (Note: No. 81: Denver → Detroit (PD). Denver traded a third-round selection (81st overall) to Detroit in exchange for OT Harvey Salem.)
3	82	Dallas Cowboys	James Brown	T	Virginia State	from Detroit (Note: No. 82: Detroit → Dallas (D). See Round 2: Dallas → Detroit.)
3	83	Buffalo Bills	Keith Goganious	LB	Penn State	
3	84	Cincinnati Bengals	Leonard Wheeler	S	Troy State	from Washington (Note: No. 84: Washington → Cincinnati (D). See Round 1: Cincinnati → Washington.)
4	85	Indianapolis Colts	Rodney Culver	RB	Notre Dame	
4	86	Tampa Bay Buccaneers	Craig Erickson	QB	Miami (FL)	
4	87	Los Angeles Rams	Shawn Harper	T	Indiana	
4	88	Cincinnati Bengals	Ricardo McDonald	LB	Pittsburgh	
4	89	San Francisco 49ers	Mark Thomas	DE	NC State	from Green Bay (Note: No. 89: Green Bay → San Francisco (D). Green Bay traded fourth- and eighth-round selections (89th and 203rd overall) to San Francisco in exchange for fourth-, fifth- and sixth-round selections (103rd, 130th and 157th overall).)
4	90	New England Patriots	Dion Lambert	CB	UCLA	from San Diego (Note: No. 90: San Diego → New England (PD). San Diego traded a fourth-round selection (90th overall) and a 1991 eleventh-round selection to New England in exchange for a 1991 fifth-round selection.)
4	91	Phoenix Cardinals	Jeff Christy ^{†}	T	Pittsburgh	
4	92	Philadelphia Eagles	Tony Brooks	RB	Notre Dame	from Cleveland (Note: No. 92: Cleveland → Philadelphia (PD). Cleveland traded a fourth-round selection (92nd overall) to Philadelphia in exchange for OT Ken Reeves.)
4	93	New England Patriots	Darren Anderson	CB	Toledo	
4	94	Pittsburgh Steelers	Charles Davenport	WR	NC State	
4	95	New Orleans Saints	Gene McGuire	C	Notre Dame	from Seattle (Note: No. 95: Seattle → New Orleans (D). Seattle traded a fourth-round selection (95th overall) to New Orleans in exchange for RB Reuben Mayes.)
4	96	New York Jets	Keo Coleman	LB	Mississippi State	
4	97	Miami Dolphins	Dwight Hollier	LB	North Carolina	
4	98	Minnesota Vikings	Roy Barker	DT	North Carolina	
4	99	New York Giants	Keith Hamilton	DT	Pittsburgh	
4	100	Phoenix Cardinals	Michael Bankston	DT	Sam Houston State	from LA Raiders via New England (Note: No. 100: LA Raiders → New England → Phoenix. Multiple trades: LA Raiders → New England (PD). The LA Raiders traded a fourth-round selection (100th overall) and a 1991 fifth-round selection to New England in exchange for a 1991 fourth-round selection. New England → Phoenix (D). See Round 2: Phoenix → New England.)
4	101	Kansas City Chiefs	Mike Evans	DE	Michigan	
4	102	Philadelphia Eagles	Casey Weldon	QB	Florida State	
4	103	Green Bay Packers	Edgar Bennett	RB	Florida State	from San Francisco (Note: No. 103: San Francisco → Green Bay (D). See Round 4: Green Bay → San Francisco.)
4	104	Atlanta Falcons	Frankie Smith	CB	Baylor	from Atlanta via New England and Dallas (Note: No. 104: Atlanta → New England → Dallas → Atlanta. Multiple trades: Atlanta → New England (D). See Round 1: New England → Atlanta. New England → Dallas (D). See Round 1: Dallas → New England. Dallas → Atlanta (D). See Round 1: Atlanta → Dallas.)
4	105	Indianapolis Colts	Tony McCoy	DT	Florida	from Dallas via LA Raiders (Note: No. 105: Dallas → LA Raiders → Indianapolis. Multiple trades: Dallas → LA Raiders (PD). Dallas traded a fourth-round selection (105th overall) to the LA Raiders in exchange for QB Steve Beuerlein. LA Raiders → Indianapolis (PD). The LA Raiders traded fourth- and eighth-round selections (105th and 212th overall) to Indianapolis in exchange for RB Eric Dickerson.)
4	106	New Orleans Saints	Sean Lumpkin	S	Minnesota	
4	107	Chicago Bears	Will Furrer	QB	Virginia Tech	
4	108	Houston Oilers	Mike Mooney	T	Georgia Tech	
4	109	Dallas Cowboys	Tom Myslinski	G	Tennessee	from Detroit (Note: No. 109: Detroit → Dallas (D). See Round 2: Dallas → Detroit.)
4	110	Denver Broncos	Chuck Johnson	G	Texas	
4	111	Buffalo Bills	Frank Kmet	DE	Purdue	
4	112	Washington Redskins	Chris Hakel	QB	William & Mary	
5	113	Indianapolis Colts	Maury Toy	RB	UCLA	
5	114	Los Angeles Rams	Chris Crooms	S	Texas A&M	
5	115	Cincinnati Bengals	Craig Thompson	TE	North Carolina A&T	
5	116	New England Patriots	Dwayne Sabb	LB	New Hampshire	from Tampa Bay (Note: No. 116: Tampa Bay → New England (PD). Tampa Bay traded a fifth-round selection (116th overall) to New England in exchange for LB Jesse Solomon.)
5	117	San Diego Chargers	Curtis Whitley	C	Clemson	
5	118	Tampa Bay Buccaneers	Rogerick Green	CB	Kansas State	from Phoenix via New Orleans (Note: No. 118: Phoenix → New Orleans → Tampa Bay. Multiple trades: Phoenix → New Orleans (PD). Phoenix traded a fifth-round selection (118th overall) and G Derek Kennard to New Orleans in exchange for CB Robert Massey. New Orleans → Tampa Bay (D). See Round 3: Tampa Bay → New Orleans.)
5	119	Green Bay Packers	Dexter McNabb	FB	Florida	
5	120	Dallas Cowboys	Greg Briggs	S	Texas Southern	from New England via Atlanta (Note: No. 120: New England → Atlanta → Dallas. Multiple trades: New England → Atlanta (PD). New England traded a fifth-round selection (120th overall) to Atlanta in exchange for G Reggie Redding. Atlanta → Dallas (D). See Round 1: Atlanta → Dallas.)
5	121	Dallas Cowboys	Rod Milstead	G	Delaware State	from Cleveland (Note: No. 121: Cleveland → Dallas (D). See Round 2: Cleveland → Dallas.)
5	122	Seattle Seahawks	Gary Dandridge	DB	Appalachian State	
5	123	Pittsburgh Steelers	Alan Haller	DB	Michigan State	
5	124	Miami Dolphins	Chris Perez	T	Kansas	
5	125	Minnesota Vikings	Ed McDaniel ^{†}	LB	Clemson	
5	126	New York Giants	Michael Wright	DB	Washington State	
5	127	New York Jets	Cal Dixon	C	Florida	
5	128	Los Angeles Raiders	Derrick Hoskins	S	Southern Miss	
5	129	Philadelphia Eagles	Corey Barlow	DB	Auburn	
5	130	Green Bay Packers	Orlando McKay	WR	Washington	from San Francisco (Note: No. 130: San Francisco → Green Bay (D). See Round 4: Green Bay → San Francisco.)
5	131	San Diego Chargers	Kevin Little	LB	North Carolina A&T	from Atlanta (Note: No. 131: Atlanta → San Diego (PD). Atlanta traded a fifth-round selection (131st overall) to San Diego in exchange for QB Billy Joe Tolliver.)
5	132	Tampa Bay Buccaneers	Santana Dotson	DE	Baylor	from Kansas City (Note: No. 132: Kansas City → Tampa Bay (PD). Kansas City traded a fifth-round selection (132nd overall) to Tampa Bay in exchange for LB Ervin Randle.)
5	133	Houston Oilers	Joe Bowden	LB	Oklahoma	from New Orleans (Note: No. 133: New Orleans → Houston (PD). New Orleans traded a fifth-round selection (133rd overall) to Houston in exchange for RB Allen Pinkett.)
5	134	Chicago Bears	Todd Harrison	TE	NC State	
5	135	Houston Oilers	Tony Brown	DB	Fresno State	
5	136	Houston Oilers	Tim Roberts	DT	Southern Miss	from Dallas (Note: No. 136: Dallas → Houston (PD). Dallas traded a fifth-round selection (136th overall) and a 1991 second-round selection to Houston in exchange for FB Alonzo Highsmith.)
5	137	Denver Broncos	Frank Robinson	DB	Boise State	
5	138	New Orleans Saints	Torrance Small	WR	Alcorn State	from Detroit (Note: No. 138: Detroit → New Orleans (PD). Detroit traded a fifth-round selection (138th overall) to New Orleans in exchange for WR Brett Perriman.)
5	139	Buffalo Bills	Matt Darby	S	UCLA	
5	140	San Diego Chargers	Eric Jonassen	T	Bloomsburg (PA)	from Washington (Note: No. 140: Washington → San Diego (PD). See Round 1: San Diego → Washington.)
6	141	Indianapolis Colts	Shoun Habersham	WR	Chattanooga	
6	142	Cincinnati Bengals	Chris Burns	DT	Middle Tennessee	
6	143	Cleveland Browns	Rico Smith	WR	Colorado	from Tampa Bay (Note: No. 143: Tampa Bay → Cleveland (D). Tampa Bay traded a sixth-round selection (143rd overall) to Cleveland in exchange for sixth- and eighth-round selections (148th and 222nd overall).)
6	144	Los Angeles Rams	Joe Campbell	RB	Middle Tennessee	
6	145	Detroit Lions	Larry Tharpe	T	Tennessee State	from New England (Note: No. 145: New England → Detroit (D). New England traded a sixth-round selection (145th overall) to Detroit in exchange for sixth-, seventh-, tenth and twelfth-round selections (165th, 194th, 277th and 333rd overall).)
6	146	Phoenix Cardinals	Brian Brauninger	T	Oklahoma	from Green Bay (Note: No. 146: Green Bay → Phoenix (PD). Green Bay traded a sixth-round selection (146th overall) to Phoenix in exchange for RB Tootie Robbins.)
6	147	San Diego Chargers	Reggie White	DT	North Carolina A&T	
6	148	Tampa Bay Buccaneers	James Malone	LB	UCLA	from Cleveland (Note: No. 148: Cleveland → Tampa Bay (D). See Round 6: Tampa Bay → Cleveland.)
6	149	Dallas Cowboys	Fallon Wacasey	TE	Tulsa	from New England (Note: No. 149: New England → Dallas (PD). New England traded a sixth-round selection (149th overall) to Dallas in exchange for LB Jesse Solomon.)
6	150	Seattle Seahawks	Michael Bates ^{†}	WR	Arizona	
6	151	San Francisco 49ers	Damien Russell	CB	Virginia Tech	from Pittsburgh (Note: No. 151: Pittsburgh → San Francisco (D). Pittsburgh traded a sixth-round selection (151st overall) to San Francisco in exchange for a seventh-round selection and two eighth-round selections (188th, 203rd and 215th overall).)
6	152	Minnesota Vikings	Mike Gaddis	RB	Oklahoma	
6	153	New York Giants	Stacey Dillard	DT	Oklahoma	
6	154	New York Jets	Glenn Cadrez	LB	Houston	
6	155	Miami Dolphins	Roosevelt Collins	LB	TCU	
6	156	Los Angeles Raiders	Tony Rowell	C	Florida	
6	157	Green Bay Packers	Mark Chmura ^{†}	TE	Boston College	from San Francisco (Note: No. 157: San Francisco → Green Bay (D). See Round 4: Green Bay → San Francisco.)
6	158	Atlanta Falcons	Terry Ray	S	Oklahoma	
6	159	Kansas City Chiefs	Tony Smith	WR	Notre Dame	
6	160	Philadelphia Eagles	Jeff Sydner	WR	Hawaii	
6	161	Chicago Bears	Mark Berry	DB	Texas	
6	162	Houston Oilers	Mario Bailey	WR	Washington	
6	163	Cleveland Browns	George Williams	DT	Notre Dame	from Dallas (Note: No. 163: Dallas → Cleveland (D). See Round 2: Cleveland → Dallas.)
6	164	New Orleans Saints	Kary Vincent	DB	Texas A&M	
6	165	New England Patriots	Tracy Boyd	G	Elizabeth City State	from Detroit (Note: No. 165: Detroit → New England (D). See Round 6: New England → Detroit.)
6	166	New York Jets	Jeff Blake ^{†}	QB	East Carolina	from Denver (Note: No. 166: Denver → NY Jets (D). Denver traded a sixth-round selection (166th overall) to the NY Jets in exchange for seventh- and eighth-round selections (181st and 208th overall).)
6	167	Buffalo Bills	Nate Turner	RB	Nebraska	
6	168	Washington Redskins	Ray Rowe	TE	San Diego State	
7	169	Indianapolis Colts	Derek Steele	DE	Maryland	
7	170	Denver Broncos	Ron Geater	DE	Iowa	from Tampa Bay (Note: No. 170: Tampa Bay → Denver (PD). Tampa Bay traded a seventh-round selection (170th overall) to Denver in exchange for WR Ricky Nattiel.)
7	171	Los Angeles Rams	Darryl Ashmore	T	Northwestern	
7	172	Cincinnati Bengals	Lance Olberding	T	Iowa	
7	173	Los Angeles Raiders	Curtis Cotton	DB	Nebraska	from Green Bay (Note: No. 173: Green Bay → LA Raiders (D). Green Bay traded a seventh-round selection (173rd overall) to the LA Raiders in exchange for seventh- and ninth-round selections (190th and 240th overall).)
7	174	San Diego Chargers	Deems May	TE	North Carolina	
7	175	Phoenix Cardinals	Derek Ware	TE	Central Oklahoma	
7	176	New England Patriots	Wayne Hawkins	WR	SW Minnesota State	
7	177	Cleveland Browns	Selwyn Jones	DB	Colorado State	
7	178	Seattle Seahawks	Mike Frier	DT	Appalachian State	
7	179	Pittsburgh Steelers	Russ Campbell	TE	Kansas State	
7	180	New York Giants	Corey Widmer	LB	Montana State	
7	181	Denver Broncos	Jim Johnson	T	Michigan State	from NY Jets (Note: No. 181: NY Jets → Denver (D). See Round 6: Denver → NY Jets.)
7	182	Atlanta Falcons	Tim Paulk	LB	Florida	from Miami (Note: No. 182: Miami → Atlanta (D). Miami traded a seventh-round selection (182nd overall) to the Atlanta in exchange for seventh- and twelfth-round selections (185th and 328th overall).)
7	183	Minnesota Vikings	David Wilson	DB	California	
7	184	Tampa Bay Buccaneers	Ken Swilling	CB	Georgia Tech	from LA Raiders (Note: No. 184: LA Raiders → Tampa Bay (D). See Round 2: Tampa Bay → LA Raiders.)
7	185	Los Angeles Raiders	Kevin Smith	RB	UCLA	from Atlanta via Miami (Note: No. 185: Atlanta → Miami → LA Raiders. Multiple trades: Atlanta → Miami (D). See Round 7: Miami → Atlanta. Miami → LA Raiders (D). Miami traded a seventh-round selection (185th overall) to the LA Raiders in exchange for seventh- and eleventh-round selections (191st and 296th overall).)
7	186	Kansas City Chiefs	Erick Anderson	LB	Michigan	
7	187	Philadelphia Eagles	William Boatwright	G	Virginia Tech	
7	188	Pittsburgh Steelers	Scottie Graham	RB	Ohio State	from San Francisco (Note: No. 188: San Francisco → Pittsburgh (D). See Round 6: Pittsburgh → San Francisco.)
7	189	Houston Oilers	Elbert Turner	WR	Illinois	
7	190	Green Bay Packers	Chris Holder	WR	Tuskegee	from Dallas via LA Raiders (Note: No. 190: Dallas → LA Raiders → Green Bay. Multiple trades: Dallas → LA Raiders (PD). Dallas traded a seventh-round selection (190th overall) to the LA Raiders in exchange for DB Garry Lewis. LA Raiders → Green Bay See Round 7: Green Bay → LA Raiders.)
7	191	Miami Dolphins	Dave Moore ^{†}	TE	Pittsburgh	from New Orleans via LA Raiders (Note: No. 191: New Orleans → LA Raiders → Miami. Multiple trades: New Orleans → LA Raiders (PD). New Orleans traded a seventh-round selection (191st overall) to the LA Raiders in exchange for S Vencie Glenn. LA Raiders → Miami See Round 7: Miami → LA Raiders.)
7	192	Chicago Bears	John Brown	WR	Houston	
7	193	Denver Broncos	Jon Bostick	WR	Nebraska	
7	194	New England Patriots	Jim Gray	DT	West Virginia	from Detroit (Note: No. 194: Detroit → New England (D). See Round 6: New England → Detroit.)
7	195	Buffalo Bills	Kurt Schulz	S	Eastern Washington	
7	196	Washington Redskins	Calvin Holmes	DB	USC	
8	197	Indianapolis Colts	Jason Belser	S	Oklahoma	
8	198	Los Angeles Rams	Rickey Jones	QB	Alabama State	
8	199	Cincinnati Bengals	Roosevelt Nix	DE	Central State (OH)	
8	200	Tampa Bay Buccaneers	Anthony McDowell	RB	Texas Tech	
8	201	San Diego Chargers	James Fuller	CB	Portland State	
8	202	Phoenix Cardinals	Eric Blount	WR	North Carolina	
8	203	Pittsburgh Steelers	Darren Perry	S	Penn State	from Green Bay via San Francisco (Note: No. 203: Green Bay → San Francisco → Pittsburgh. Multiple trades: Green Bay → San Francisco (D). See Round 4: Green Bay → San Francisco. San Francisco → Pittsburgh (D). See Round 6: Pittsburgh → San Francisco.)
8	204	New England Patriots	Scott Lockwood	RB	USC	
8	205	New England Patriots	Sam Gash ^{†}	FB	Penn State	
8	206	Pittsburgh Steelers	Hesham Ismail	G	Florida	
8	207	Seattle Seahawks	Muhammad Shamsid-Deen	RB	Tennessee-Chattanooga	
8	208	Denver Broncos	Dietrich Lockridge	G	Jackson State	from NY Jets (Note: No. 208: NY Jets → Denver (PD). See Round 6: Denver → NY Jets.)
8	209	Miami Dolphins	Andre Powell	LB	Penn State	
8	210	Minnesota Vikings	Luke Fisher	TE	East Carolina	
8	211	New York Giants	Kent Graham	QB	Ohio State	
8	212	Indianapolis Colts	Ronald Humphrey	RB	Mississippi Valley State	from LA Raiders (Note: No. 212: LA Raiders → Indianapolis (D). See Round 4: LA Raiders → Indianapolis.)
8	213	Kansas City Chiefs	Jim Jennings	G	San Diego State	
8	214	Philadelphia Eagles	Chuck Bullough	LB	Michigan State	
8	215	Pittsburgh Steelers	Nate Williams	DT	Mississippi State	from San Francisco (Note: No. 215: San Francisco → Pittsburgh (D). See Round 6: Pittsburgh → San Francisco.)
8	216	Atlanta Falcons	Derrick Moore	RB	Northeastern State	
8	217	Atlanta Falcons	Reggie Dwight	TE	Troy State	from Dallas (Note: No. 217: Dallas → Atlanta (PD). See Round 2: Dallas → Atlanta.)
8	218	New Orleans Saints	Robert Stewart	DT	Alabama	
8	219	New York Jets	Vincent Brownlee	WR	Ole Miss	
8	220	Houston Oilers	Bucky Richardson	QB	Texas A&M	
8	221	Detroit Lions	Willie Clay	S	Georgia Tech	
8	222	Tampa Bay Buccaneers	Mike Pawlawski	QB	California	from Denver via Dallas and Cleveland (Note: No. 222: Denver → Dallas → Cleveland → Tampa Bay. Multiple trades: Denver → Dallas (PD). Denver traded an eighth-round selection (222nd overall) and a 1991 seventh-round selection to Dallas in exchange for OL Dave Widell. Dallas → Cleveland (PD). See Round 2: Cleveland → Dallas. Cleveland → Tampa Bay (D). See Round 6: Tampa Bay → Cleveland.)
8	223	Buffalo Bills	Leonard Humphries	CB	Penn State	
8	224	Washington Redskins	Darryl Moore	G	UTEP	
9	225	Indianapolis Colts	Eddie Miller	WR	South Carolina	
9	226	Cincinnati Bengals	Ostell Miles	RB	Houston	
9	227	Minnesota Vikings	Brad Johnson ^{†}	QB	Florida State	from Tampa Bay (Note: No. 227: Tampa Bay → Minnesota (PD). Tampa Bay traded a ninth-round selection (227th overall) to Minnesota in exchange for LB Jimmy Williams.)
9	228	Los Angeles Rams	T. J. Rubley	QB	Tulsa	
9	229	Phoenix Cardinals	David Henson	DT	Central Arkansas	
9	230	Green Bay Packers	Ty Detmer	QB	BYU	1990 Heisman Trophy winner
9	231	San Diego Chargers	Johnnie Barnes	WR	Hampton	
9	232	New England Patriots	David Dixon	G	Arizona State	
9	233	Cleveland Browns	Tim Hill	DB	Kansas	
9	234	Seattle Seahawks	Larry Stayner	TE	Boise State	
9	235	Pittsburgh Steelers	Elnardo Webster	LB	Rutgers	
9	236	Miami Dolphins	Tony Tellington	DB	Youngstown State	
9	237	Minnesota Vikings	Ronnie West	WR	Pittsburg State (KS)	
9	238	New York Giants	Anthony Prior	DB	Washington State	
9	239	Phoenix Cardinals	Tyrone Williams	WR	Western Ontario	from NY Jets (Note: No. 239: NY Jets → Phoenix (PD). The NY Jets traded a ninth-round selection (239th overall) to Phoenix in exchange for DB Lonnie Young.)
9	240	Green Bay Packers	Shazzon Bradley	DT	Tennessee	from LA Raiders (Note: No. 240: LA Raiders → Green Bay (D). See Round 7: Green Bay → LA Raiders.)
9	241	Philadelphia Eagles	Ephesians Bartley	LB	Florida	
9	242	San Francisco 49ers	Darian Hagan	WR	Colorado	
9	243	Atlanta Falcons	Keith Alex	T	Texas A&M	
9	244	Kansas City Chiefs	Jay Leeuwenburg	C	Colorado	
9	245	New Orleans Saints	Donald Jones	LB	Washington	
9	246	Chicago Bears	Mirko Jurkovic	G	Notre Dame	
9	247	Houston Oilers	Bernard Dafney	T	Tennessee	
9	248	Dallas Cowboys	Nate Kirtman	DB	Pomona-Pitzer	
9	249	Denver Broncos	Muhammad Oliver	CB	Oregon	
9	250	Dallas Cowboys	Chris Hall	DB	East Carolina	from Detroit (Note: No. 250: Detroit → Dallas (D). See Round 2: Dallas → Detroit.)
9	251	Buffalo Bills	Chris Walsh	WR	Stanford	
9	252	Washington Redskins	Boone Powell	LB	Texas	
10	253	Indianapolis Colts	Steve Grant	LB	West Virginia	
10	254	Tampa Bay Buccaneers	Elijah Alexander	LB	Kansas State	
10	255	Los Angeles Raiders	Tim Lester	RB	Eastern Kentucky	
10	256	Cincinnati Bengals	Horace Smith	DB	Oregon Tech	
10	257	Green Bay Packers	Andrew Oberg	T	North Carolina	
10	258	San Diego Chargers	Arthur Paul	DT	Arizona State	
10	259	Phoenix Cardinals	Reggie Yarbrough	RB	Fullerton State	
10	260	Cleveland Browns	Marcus Lowe	DT	Baylor	
10	261	New England Patriots	Turner Baur	TE	Stanford	
10	262	Pittsburgh Steelers	Mike Saunders	RB	Iowa	
10	263	Seattle Seahawks	Anthony Hamlet	DE	Miami (FL)	
10	264	Minnesota Vikings	Brad Culpepper	DT	Florida	
10	265	New York Giants	George Rooks	DE	Syracuse	
10	266	New York Jets	Mario Johnson	DT	Missouri	
10	267	Miami Dolphins	Raoul Spears	RB	USC	
10	268	Los Angeles Raiders	Alberto White	MLB	Texas Southern	
10	269	San Francisco 49ers	Corey Mayfield	DE	Oklahoma	
10	270	Atlanta Falcons	Darryl Hardy	LB	Tennessee	
10	271	Kansas City Chiefs	Jerry Ostroski	G	Tulsa	
10	272	Philadelphia Eagles	Mark McMillian	CB	Alabama	
10	273	Chicago Bears	Nikki Fisher	RB	Virginia	
10	274	Houston Oilers	Dion Johnson	WR	East Carolina	
10	275	Dallas Cowboys	John Terry	G	Livingstone	
10	276	New Orleans Saints	Marcus Dowdell	WR	Tennessee State	
10	277	New England Patriots	Steve Gordon	C	California	from Detroit (Note: No. 277: Detroit → New England (D). See Round 6: New England → Detroit.)
10	278	Denver Broncos	Bob Meeks	C	Auburn	
10	279	Buffalo Bills	Barry Rose	WR	Wisconsin–Stevens Point	
10	280	Washington Redskins	Tony Barker	LB	Rice	
11	281	Los Angeles Rams	Brian Townsend	LB	Michigan	from Indianapolis (Note: No. 281: Indianapolis → LA Rams (PD). See Round 3: Indianapolis → LA Rams.)
11	282	Los Angeles Rams	Brian Thomas	WR	Southern	
11	283	Cincinnati Bengals	John Earle	T	Western Illinois	
11	284	Tampa Bay Buccaneers	Mazio Royster	RB	USC	
11	285	San Diego Chargers	Keith McAfee	RB	Texas A&M	
11	286	Phoenix Cardinals	Rob Baxley	T	Iowa	
11	287	Green Bay Packers	Gabe Mokwuah	LB	American International	
11	288	New England Patriots	Mike Petko	LB	Nebraska	
11	289	Cleveland Browns	Augustin Olobia	WR	Washington State	
11	290	Seattle Seahawks	Kris Rongen	G	Washington	
11	291	Pittsburgh Steelers	Kendall Gammon ^{†}	G	Pittsburg State (KS)	
11	292	New York Giants	Nate Singleton	WR	Grambling State	
11	293	New York Jets	Eric Boles	WR	Central Washington	
11	294	Miami Dolphins	Lee Miles	WR	Baylor	
11	295	Minnesota Vikings	Chuck Evans	RB	Clark Atlanta	
11	296	Miami Dolphins	Mark Barsotti	QB	Fresno State	from LA Raiders (Note: No. 296: LA Raiders → Miami (D). See Round 7: Miami → LA Raiders.)
11	297	Atlanta Falcons	Robin Jones	DE	Baylor	
11	298	Kansas City Chiefs	Doug Rigby	DE	Wyoming	
11	299	Philadelphia Eagles	Pumpy Tudors	P	Tennessee-Chattanooga	
11	300	San Francisco 49ers	Tom Covington	TE	Georgia Tech	
11	301	Houston Oilers	Anthony Davis	LB	Utah	
11	302	Dallas Cowboys	Tim Daniel	WR	Florida A&M	
11	303	New Orleans Saints	Mike Gisler	G	Houston	
11	304	Chicago Bears	Louis Age	T	Southwestern Louisiana	
11	305	Denver Broncos	Cedric Tillman	WR	Alcorn State	
11	306	Detroit Lions	Ed Tillison	RB	NW Missouri	
11	307	Buffalo Bills	Vince Marrow	TE	Toledo	
11	308	Washington Redskins	Terry Smith	WR	Penn State	
12	309	Indianapolis Colts	Mike Brandon	DE	Florida	
12	310	Cincinnati Bengals	Eric Shaw	LB	Louisiana Tech	
12	311	Tampa Bay Buccaneers	Klaus Wilmsmeyer	P	Louisville	
12	312	Los Angeles Rams	Kelvin Harris	C	Miami (FL)	
12	313	Phoenix Cardinals	Lance Wilson	DT	Texas	
12	314	Green Bay Packers	Brett Collins	LB	Washington	
12	315	San Diego Chargers	Carlos Huerta	K	Miami (FL)	
12	316	Cleveland Browns	Keithen McCant	QB	Nebraska	
12	317	Dallas Cowboys	Don Harris	DB	Texas Tech	from New England (Note: No. 317: New England → Dallas (PD). New England traded a twelfth-round selection (317th overall) to Dallas in exchange for TE Rich Gicewicz.)
12	318	Pittsburgh Steelers	Cornelius Benton	QB	Connecticut	
12	319	Seattle Seahawks	Chico Fraley	LB	Washington	
12	320	Seattle Seahawks	John MacNeill	DE	Michigan State	from NY Jets (Note: No. 320: NY Jets → Seattle (PD). The NY Jets traded a twelfth-round selection (320th overall) to Seattle in exchange for OT Ron Mattes.)
12	321	Miami Dolphins	Milton Biggins	TE	Western Kentucky	
12	322	Minnesota Vikings	Joe Randolph	WR	Elon	
12	323	New York Giants	Charles Swann	WR	Indiana State	
12	324	Los Angeles Raiders	Tom Roth	G	Southern Illinois	
12	325	Kansas City Chiefs	Corey Williams	DB	Oklahoma State	
12	326	Philadelphia Eagles	Brandon Houston	T	Oklahoma	
12	327	San Francisco 49ers	Matt LaBounty	DE	Oregon	
12	328	Miami Dolphins	Kameno Bell	RB	Illinois	from Atlanta (Note: No. 328: Atlanta → Miami (D). See Round 7: Miami → Atlanta.)
12	329	Cleveland Browns	Tim Simpson	C	Illinois	from Dallas (Note: No. 329: Dallas → Cleveland (PD). See Round 2: Cleveland → Dallas.)
12	330	New Orleans Saints	Scott Adell	T	North Carolina State	
12	331	Chicago Bears	Chris Wilson	LB	Oklahoma	
12	332	Houston Oilers	Joe Wood	K	Air Force	
12	333	New England Patriots	Freeman Baysinger	WR	Humboldt State	from Detroit (Note: No. 333: Detroit → New England (D). See Round 6: New England → Detroit.)
12	334	Denver Broncos	John Granby	DB	Virginia Tech	
12	335	Buffalo Bills	Matt Rodgers	QB	Iowa	
12	336	Washington Redskins	Matt Elliott	C	Michigan	

== Supplemental draft ==
Rnd.	Pick	Team	Player	Pos.	College	Notes
1	—	New York Giants	Dave Brown	QB	Duke	
2	—	Kansas City Chiefs	Darren Mickell	DE	Florida	

== Hall of Famers ==
To date, no member of the 1992 NFL draft has been inducted into the Pro Football Hall of Fame.

== Notable undrafted players ==
†	Pro Bowler

Original NFL team	Player	Pos.	College	Notes
Chicago Bears	Kelly Blackwell	TE	TCU	
Chicago Bears	Jim Schwantz ^{†}	LB	Purdue	
Cincinnati Bengals	Kevin Sargent	T	Eastern Washington	
Cincinnati Bengals	Milt Stegall	WR	Miami	
Cincinnati Bengals	Jeff Thomason	TE	Oregon	
Dallas Cowboys	Lin Elliot	K	Texas Tech	
Denver Broncos	Paschall Davis	LB	Texas A&M–Kingsville	
Denver Broncos	Mark Flythe	DE	Penn State	
Denver Broncos	Russell Freeman	G	Georgia Tech	
Denver Broncos	John Kacherski	LB	Ohio State	
Denver Broncos	Arthur Marshall	WR	Georgia	
Denver Broncos	Willie Oshodin	DE	Villanova	
Denver Broncos	John Sullins	LB	Alabama	
Detroit Lions	John Derby	LB	Iowa	
Detroit Lions	Eric Lynch	RB	Grand Valley State	
Detroit Lions	Bernard Wilson	DT	Tennessee State	
Green Bay Packers	Sebastian Barrie	DE	Liberty	
Houston Oilers	Reggie Brown	WR	Alabama State	
Houston Oilers	Derrick Ned	RB	Grambling State	
Kansas City Chiefs	Santo Stephens	LB	Temple	
Kansas City Chiefs	Doug Terry	S	Kansas	
Los Angeles Raiders	Daryl Hobbs	WR	Pacific	
Los Angeles Raiders	Tyrone Montgomery	RB	Ole Miss	
Miami Dolphins	Bernie Parmalee	RB	Ball State	
Miami Dolphins	Charles Pope	G	Central State (OH)	
Minnesota Vikings	Roman Anderson	K	Houston	
Minnesota Vikings	John Jett	P	East Carolina	
Minnesota Vikings	Ed Sutter	LB	Northwestern	
New York Giants	Brian Allred	CB	Sacramento State	
New York Giants	Anthony Lynn	RB	Texas Tech	
New York Giants	Corey Raymond	CB	LSU	
New York Jets	Matt Willig	T	USC	
Phoenix Cardinals	Keith Rucker	DT	Eastern Michigan	
Pittsburgh Steelers	Mark Didio	WR	UConn	
San Diego Chargers	Alfred Pupunu	TE	Weber State	
San Francisco 49ers	Derrick Deese	T	USC	
San Francisco 49ers	Mark Seay	WR	Long Beach State	
Seattle Seahawks	James Harris	DE	Temple	
Seattle Seahawks	Rafael Robinson	CB	Wisconsin	
Seattle Seahawks	Tyrone Rodgers	DT	Washington	
Seattle Seahawks	Don Silvestri	K	Pittsburgh	
Seattle Seahawks	Brian Treggs	WR	California	
Tampa Bay Buccaneers	Leslie Shepherd	WR	Temple	

== Trades ==
In the explanations below, (D) denotes trades that took place during the 1992 Draft, while (PD) indicates trades completed pre-draft.

Round 1

Round 2

Round 3

Round 4

Round 5

Round 6

Round 7

Round 8

Round 9

Round 10

Round 11

Round 12
