= 1991 Independence Bowl =

1991 Poulan/Weed Eater Independence Bowl
Georgia Bulldogs	Arkansas Razorbacks
(8–3)	(6–5)
SEC	SWC
24	15
Head coach: Ray Goff	Head coach: Jack Crowe
AP / Coaches; 24 / 24
	1	2	3	4	Total
Georgia	14	3	7	0	24
Arkansas	0	7	0	8	15
- Date: December 29, 1991
- Season: 1991
- Stadium: Independence Stadium
- Location: Shreveport, Louisiana
- MVP: Andre Hastings, UGA; Torrey Evans, UGA
- Referee: Gene Wurtz (WAC)
- Attendance: 46,932
- Payout: US$1,300,000

The 1991 Independence Bowl was a post-season college football bowl game between the Arkansas Razorbacks and the Georgia Bulldogs. Georgia defeated Arkansas, 24–15.

== Setting ==
Arkansas and Georgia had met in three previous bowl games: the 1969 Sugar Bowl, with Arkansas taking a 16–2 decision, the 1976 Cotton Bowl Classic, which Arkansas also won 31–10, and the 1987 Liberty Bowl, which Georgia won 20-17. Georgia's head coach Ray Goff played quarterback in the 1976 Cotton Bowl loss to Arkansas.

=== Arkansas ===
With the Southwest Conference dying, Arkansas athletic director Frank Broyles had engineered a deal for Arkansas to move to the flourishing Southeastern Conference. Arkansas' final season before the move was in 1991 when the Razorbacks finished the regular season at 6–5.

=== Georgia ===
Georgia defeated #6 Clemson, but lost to an unranked Vanderbilt team to enter the game at 8–3.

== Game summary ==
Georgia began the scoring early, throwing two touchdown passes from Eric Zeier to take an early 14–0 lead. After Georgia added a second-quarter field goal, Arkansas finally got on the board when E. D. Jackson rushed in from seven yards out. After halftime, Georgia's Andre Hastings broke a 53-yard touchdown run. Jackson would again score for the Hogs, and add a two-point conversion. However, the Hogs couldn't score again and fell short, 24–15. Arkansas was without their starting QB Jason Allen.
