= 1991 Florida Gators football team =

American college football season

1991 Florida Gators football

SEC champion

Sugar Bowl, L 28–39 vs. Notre Dame
- Conference: Southeastern Conference

Ranking
- Coaches: No. 8
- AP: No. 7
- Record: 10–2 (7–0 SEC)
- Head coach: Steve Spurrier (2nd season)
- Offensive scheme: Fun and gun
- Defensive coordinator: Ron Zook (1st season)
- Base defense: 4–4–3
- Captains: Brad Culpepper; Cal Dixon; Tim Paulk
- Home stadium: Ben Hill Griffin Stadium

1991 Southeastern Conference football standings
	Conf.					Overall
Team	W		L		T	W		L		T
No. 7 Florida $	7	–	0	–	0	10	–	2	–	0
No. 5 Alabama	6	–	1	–	0	11	–	1	–	0
No. 14 Tennessee	5	–	2	–	0	9	–	3	–	0
No. 17 Georgia	4	–	3	–	0	9	–	3	–	0
Mississippi State	4	–	3	–	0	7	–	5	–	0
LSU	3	–	4	–	0	5	–	6	–	0
Vanderbilt	3	–	4	–	0	5	–	6	–	0
Auburn	2	–	5	–	0	5	–	6	–	0
Ole Miss	1	–	6	–	0	5	–	6	–	0
Kentucky	0	–	7	–	0	3	–	8	–	0
$ – Conference champion; Rankings from AP Poll

The 1991 Florida Gators football team represented the University of Florida during the 1991 NCAA Division I-A football season. The season was Steve Spurrier's second as the head coach of the Florida Gators football team. The Gators were led by quarterback Shane Matthews and first-team All-American defensive tackle Brad Culpepper.

Spurrier's 1991 Florida Gators compiled the first-ever ten-win season in program history, an overall record of 10–2 and a perfect SEC record of 7–0.

== Schedule ==
Date	Time	Opponent	Rank	Site	TV	Result	Attendance	Source
September 7		San Jose State*	No. 6	Ben Hill Griffin Stadium; Gainesville, FL		W 59–21	83,067	
September 14	7:30 p.m.	No. 17 Alabama	No. 6	Ben Hill Griffin Stadium; Gainesville, FL (rivalry)	ESPN	W 35–0	85,069	
September 21	3:30 p.m.	at No. 18 Syracuse*	No. 5	Carrier Dome; Syracuse, NY	ABC	L 21–38	49,823	
September 28		vs. No. 21 Mississippi State	No. 14	Florida Citrus Bowl; Orlando, FL	TBS	W 29–7	69,328	
October 5	8:00 p.m.	at LSU	No. 13	Tiger Stadium; Baton Rouge, LA (rivalry)	PPV	W 16–0	72,019	
October 12	7:30 p.m.	No. 4 Tennessee	No. 10	Ben Hill Griffin Stadium; Gainesville, FL (rivalry)	ESPN	W 35–18	85,165	
October 19	1:00 p.m.	Northern Illinois*^{†}	No. 6	Ben Hill Griffin Stadium; Gainesville, FL		W 41–10	83,708	
November 2	3:30 p.m.	at Auburn	No. 6	Jordan-Hare Stadium; Auburn, AL (rivalry)	ABC	W 31–10	83,714	
November 9	4:00 p.m.	vs. No. 23 Georgia	No. 6	Gator Bowl Stadium; Jacksonville, FL (rivalry)	ESPN	W 45–13	81,679	
November 16		Kentucky	No. 5	Ben Hill Griffin Stadium; Gainesville, FL (rivalry)		W 35–26	84,109	
November 30	12:00 p.m.	No. 3 Florida State*	No. 5	Ben Hill Griffin Stadium; Gainesville, FL (rivalry)	ABC	W 14–9	85,461	
January 1, 1992	8:00 p.m.	vs. No. 18 Notre Dame*	No. 3	Louisiana Superdome; New Orleans, LA (Sugar Bowl)	ABC	L 28–39	76,477	
*Non-conference game; ^{†}Homecoming; Rankings from AP Poll released prior to the game; All times are in Eastern time

== Rankings ==
Ranking movements Legend: ██ Increase in ranking ██ Decrease in ranking ( ) = First-place votes
	Week															
Poll	Pre	1	2	3	4	5	6	7	8	9	10	11	12	13	14	Final
AP	5 (1)	6	6 (1)	5 (1)	14	13	10	6	6	6	6	5	5	5	3	7
Coaches	7	6	7	5 (1)	15	13	10	6	6	6	6	5	5	5	4	8

== Game summaries ==
=== San Jose State ===
The season opened with a 59–21 victory over the San Jose State Spartans.

=== Alabama ===
The Gators defeated Alabama, 35–0. Spurrier treasured the wins against the Crimson Tide: "Those victories early – '90, '91 – really got us started there at Florida ..."

=== Syracuse ===
The 1991 season also included a disappointing 38–21 road loss to the seventeenth-ranked Syracuse Orangemen in the Carrier Dome.

=== Mississippi State ===
The Gators had a dominating confidence win over the twenty-first-ranked Mississippi State Bulldogs, 29–7.

=== LSU ===
Florida blanked the LSU Tigers 16–0.

=== Tennessee ===
#4 Volunteers at #10 Gators

Team	1	2	3	4	Total
Tennessee	2	10	3	3	18
• Florida	7	14	7	7	35

- Date: Saturday, October 12
- Location: Ben Hill Griffin Stadium, Gainesville, Florida
- Game attendance: 85,165
- Television network: ESPN

Scoring summary
1	TENN	C. Smith tackles Matthews for a safety	TENN 2-0
1	FLA	T. Jackson 2 yard pass from Matthews (Czyzewski kick)	FLA 7-2
2	FLA	Everett 29 yard pass from Matthews (Czyzewski kick)	FLA 14-2
2	TENN	Fleming 4 yard pass from Kelly (Becksvoort kick)	FLA 14-9
2	FLA	Rhett 4 yard run (Czyzewski kick)	FLA 21-9
2	TENN	Becksvoort 43 yard field goal	Florida 21-12
3	FLA	Rhett 3 yard run (Czyzewski kick)	FLA 28-12
3	TENN	Becksvoort 23 yard field goal	Florida 28-15
4	TENN	Becksvoort 23 yard field goal	Florida 28-18
4	FLA	Kennedy 44 yard interception return (Czyzewski kick)	Florida 35-18

The Gators defeated the fourth-ranked Tennessee Volunteers 35–18.

=== Northern Illinois ===
Florida beat Northern Illinois 41–10 .

=== Auburn ===
The Auburn Tigers fell to Florida 31–10.

=== Georgia ===
#6 Florida vs. #23 Georgia

Team	1	2	3	4	Total
• Florida	7	21	3	14	45
Georgia	3	3	7	0	13

- Date: Saturday, November 9
- Location: Gator Bowl, Jacksonville, Florida
- Game attendance: 81,769

Scoring summary
1	FLA	W. Jackson 4 yard pass from Matthews (Czyzewski kick)	FLA 7-0
1	UGA	Parkman 41 yard field goal	FLA 7-3
2	FLA	Rhett 13 yard run (Czyzewski kick)	FLA 14-3
2	FLA	Houston 36 yard pass from Matthews (Czyzewski kick)	FLA 21-3
2	FLA	Sullivan 61 yard pass from Matthews (Czyzewski kick)	FLA 28-3
2	UGA	Parkman 25 yard field goal	FLA 28-6
3	FLA	Czyzewski 25 yard field goal	FLA 31-6
3	UGA	Hastings 5 yard pass from Zeier (Peterson kick)	FLA 31-13
4	FLA	W. Jackson 9 yard pass from Matthews (Czyzewski kick)	FLA 38-13
4	FLA	W. Jackson 24 yard pass from Fox (Czyzewski kick)	FLA 45-13

The Gators defeated rival and twenty-third-ranked Georgia Bulldogs 45–13.

=== Kentucky ===
Florida clinched its first SEC title with a hard-fought win over the Kentucky Wildcats, 35–26. "The Gators appeared on their way to a comfortable victory with a 28-6 lead in the third quarter. That's when the UF band started playing the song "Pour Some Sugar on Me" by Def Leppard and students began throwing little sugar packets into the air. Then UK quarterback Pookie Jones went wild, almost spoiling the party. "

=== Florida State ===
#3 Florida State Seminoles (10–1) at #5 Florida Gators (9–1)

Quarter	1	2	3	4	Total
Florida St	0	3	0	6	9
Florida	0	7	7	0	14

at Ben Hill Griffin Stadium, Gainesville, Florida

- Date: November 30
- Game attendance: 85,461
- TV announcers (ABC): Keith Jackson and Bob Griese
- Recap/Box

Game information

First quarter

- No scoring

Second quarter

- FSU – Gerry Thomas 19-yard field goal, 8:31. Florida St 3–0. Drive:
- UF – Errict Rhett 3-yard run (Arden Czyzewski kick), 3:11. Florida 7–3. Drive:

Third quarter

- UF – Harrison Houston 72-yard pass from Shane Matthews (Arden Czyzewski kick), 7:32. Florida 14–3. Drive:

Fourth quarter

- FSU – Amp Lee 25-yard pass from Casey Weldon (pass failed), 5:24. Florida 14–9. Drive:

Top passers

- FSU – Casey Weldon – 24/51, 305 yards, TD, INT
- UF – Shane Matthews – 13/30, 208 yards, TD, 3 INT

Top rushers

- FSU – Amp Lee – 9 rushes, 24 yards
- UF – Errict Rhett – 24 rushes, 109 yards, TD

Top receivers

- FSU – Kez McCorvey – 6 receptions, 89 yards
- UF – Harrison Houston – 2 receptions, 76 yards, TD

Among the Gators' 1991 victories, the 14–9 defensive upset of the Florida State Seminoles was a particularly memorable victory played in front of a record home crowd (the previous record set only five weeks earlier vs. Tennessee). The Gators scored touchdowns on a first-quarter run by tailback Errict Rhett, and a 72-yard bomb from Shane Matthews to wide receiver Harrison Houston in the third quarter, and held on to win. Gators defensive ends Darren Mickell and Harvey Thomas kept Seminoles quarterback Casey Weldon off balance and on the run in the second half, and, in the fourth quarter, Gators safeties Will White and Del Speer combined to break up a fourth-down pass to the end zone by Weldon with two minutes remaining§, thus saving the victory for Florida.

=== Sugar Bowl ===
Team	1	2	3	4	Total
• Fighting Irish	0	7	10	22	39
Gators	10	6	0	12	28

- Date: September 14
- Location: Louisiana Superdome, New Orleans, LA
- Game attendance: 76,447
- Game weather: Indoors
- TV announcers (ABC): Al Michaels, Frank Gifford, Dan Dierdorf

The Gators closed out their season with their first New Year's Day bowl appearance since 1974, a 39–28 defeat by the Notre Dame Fighting Irish in the Sugar Bowl, and were ranked seventh in the final Associated Press Poll. Florida won the team's first official SEC championship, 59 seasons after joining the conference as a charter member. Quarterback Shane Matthews repeated as SEC Player of the Year in 1991.

== Roster ==
1991 Florida Gators football team roster
Players
Coaches
Offense

Pos.	#	Name	Class
RB		Brady Ackerman
RB		Chris Bilkie
OL	69	Brian Fisher
TE		Charlie Dean
QB	12	Terry Dean
C	59	Cal Dixon	Sr
WR		Monty Duncan
WR		Tre Everett
WR		Lester Ferdinand
TE		Jim Franklin
WR		Kevin Glenn
WR		Aubrey Hill
WR	84	Harrison Houston
OL		Hesham Ismail	Sr
TE		Terrell Jackson
WR		Willie Jackson
QB		G. A. Mangus
QB	9	Shane Matthews	Jr
RB		Willie McClendon
RB		Dexter McNabb
RB		Kelvin Randolph
WR		Ted Reynolds
RB	33	Errict Rhett	So
OL		Tony Rowell
TE		George Rushing
WR		Alonzo Sullivan
OL		Jim Watson
OL		Mark White

Defense

Pos.	#	Name	Class
DB		Myrick Anderson
DB		Ephesians Bartley
DL		Kevin Carter
DL	50	Brad Culpepper	Sr
DL		William Gaines
DB		Lawrence Hatch
CB		Larry Kennedy
DL		Tony McCoy
DE		Darren Mickell
LB		Carlton Miles
DB		Marquette Oliver
LB		Tim Paulk
LB		Ed Robinson
CB		Del Speer	Jr
DE		Harvey Thomas
S	2	Will White	Jr
FS	20	Sammy McCorkle	Fr

Special teams

Pos.	#	Name	Class
K		Arden Czyzewski
P		Shayne Edge

Head coach

- Steve Spurrier

Coordinators/assistant coaches

- Ron Zook (DC)
- Charlie Strong (DE)

Legend

- (C) Team captain
- (S) Suspended
- (I) Ineligible
- Injured
- Redshirt

== NFLdraft ==
The following Gators were selected in the 1992 NFL draft after the season.

Round	Pick	Player	Position	NFL team
4	105	Tony McCoy	Defensive tackle	Indianapolis Colts
5	119	Dexter McNabb	Fullback	Green Bay Packers
5	127	Cal Dixon	Center	New York Jets
6	156	Tony Rowell	Center	Los Angeles Raiders
7	182	Tim Paulk	Linebacker	Atlanta Falcons
8	206	Hesham Ismail	Guard	Pittsburgh Steelers
9	241	Ephesians Bartley	Linebacker	Philadelphia Eagles
10	264	Brad Culpepper	Defensive tackle	Minnesota Vikings
12	309	Mike Brandon	Defensive end	Indianapolis Colts
