= 1991 Tulane Green Wave football team =

American college football season

1991 Tulane Green Wave football
- Conference: Independent
- Record: 1–10
- Head coach: Greg Davis (4th season)
- Home stadium: Louisiana Superdome

1991 NCAA Division I-A independents football records
	Conf.			Overall
Team	W	L	T	W		L		T
No. 9 East Carolina		–		11	–	1	–	0
No. 4 Florida State		–		11	–	2	–	0
No. 3 Penn State		–		11	–	2	–	0
No. 21 Tulsa		–		10	–	2	–	0
Louisiana Tech		–		8	–	1	–	2
No. 13 Notre Dame		–		10	–	3	–	0
Akron		–		5	–	6	–	0
Memphis State		–		5	–	6	–	0
Army		–		4	–	7	–	0
Cincinnati		–		4	–	7	–	0
Southern Miss		–		4	–	7	–	0
South Carolina		–		3	–	6	–	2
Southwestern Louisiana		–		2	–	8	–	1
Louisville		–		2	–	9	–	0
Northern Illinois		–		2	–	9	–	0
Tulane		–		1	–	10	–	0
Navy		–		1	–	10	–	0
Rankings from AP Poll

The 1991 Tulane Green Wave football team was an American football team that represented Tulane University during the 1991 NCAA Division I-A football season as an independent. In their fourth year under head coach Greg Davis, the team compiled a 1–10 record.

== Schedule ==
Date	Opponent	Site	Result	Attendance	Source
August 31	Ole Miss	Louisiana Superdome; New Orleans, LA (rivalry)	L 3–22	32,879	
September 7	at No. 1 Florida State	Doak Campbell Stadium; Tallahassee, FL	L 11–38	61,801	
September 14	at No. 25 Mississippi State	Scott Field; Starkville, MS	L 0–48	36,429	
September 21	Rice	Louisiana Superdome; New Orleans, LA	L 19–28	18,475	
September 28	No. T–10 Syracuse	Louisiana Superdome; New Orleans, LA	L 0–24	19,729	
October 5	SMU	Louisiana Superdome; New Orleans, LA	L 17–31	19,708	
October 12	at No. 19 Alabama	Bryant–Denny Stadium; Tuscaloosa, AL	L 0–62	70,123	
October 19	at Southern Miss	M. M. Roberts Stadium; Hattiesburg, MS (rivalry)	L 14–47	16,558	
November 2	at No. 17 East Carolina	Ficklen Memorial Stadium; Greenville, North Carolina	L 28–38	31,126	
November 9	Navy	Louisiana Superdome; New Orleans, LA	W 34–7	23,322	
November 23	LSU	Louisiana Superdome; New Orleans, LA (Battle for the Rag)	L 20–39	38,384	
Rankings from AP Poll released prior to the game; Source:
