= Dexter McNabb =

American football player (born 1969)

No. 45, 44, 38
- Position: Fullback

Personal information
- Born: July 9, 1969 (age 57); DeFuniak Springs, Florida, U.S.
- Listed height: 6 ft 2 in (1.88 m)
- Listed weight: 250 lb (113 kg)

Career information
- High school: Walton (DeFuniak Springs)
- College: Florida
- NFL draft: 1992: 5th round, 119th overall pick

Career history
- Green Bay Packers (1992–1993); Jacksonville Jaguars (1995)*; Philadelphia Eagles (1995); New Orleans Saints (1996)*
- * Offseason or practice squad member only

Career NFL statistics
- Rushing yards: 11
- Rushing average: 5.5
- Return yards: 15
- Stats at Pro Football Reference

Dexter Eugene McNabb (born July 9, 1969) is an American former professional football player who was a fullback for three seasons in the National Football League (NFL) during the 1990s. McNabb played college football for the Florida Gators, and thereafter, he played professionally for the Green Bay Packers and the Philadelphia Eagles of the NFL.

== Early life ==
McNabb was born in DeFuniak Springs, Florida. He attended Walton High School in DeFuniak Springs, and played high school football for the Walton Braves.

== College career ==
McNabb accepted an athletic scholarship to attend the University of Florida in Gainesville, Florida, where he played for coach Galen Hall and coach Steve Spurrier's Gators teams from 1988 to 1991. During McNabb's senior season in 1991, the Gators won their first official Southeastern Conference (SEC) football championship.

== Professional career ==
The Green Bay Packers selected McNabb in the fifth round (119th pick overall) of the 1992 NFL draft. He played for the Packers for two seasons from 1992 to 1993. After a year away from the NFL, he spent the 1995 season with the Philadelphia Eagles. McNabb played in thirty-three regular season NFL games, mainly as a blocking fullback for the Packers and Eagles, and received few carries.

== Life after football ==
After his NFL career was over, McNabb returned to Gainesville and graduated from the University of Florida with bachelor's degree in sociology in 2003. In 2010, he worked as an associate principal at Pulaski High School in Pulaski, Wisconsin. McNabb previously worked as an administrator for at-risk students at West De Pere High School in West De Pere, Wisconsin, where he also served as an assistant football coach and Head girls' track and field coach for the West De Pere Phantoms. From 2023–present, McNabb serves as the principal of Green Bay West High School.

== See also ==
- Florida Gators football, 1980–89
- Florida Gators football, 1990–99
- List of Florida Gators in the NFL draft
- List of University of Florida alumni
