= 1991 Tennessee Volunteers football team =

American college football season

1991 Tennessee Volunteers football

Fiesta Bowl, L 17–42 vs. Penn State
- Conference: Southeastern Conference

Ranking
- Coaches: No. 15
- AP: No. 14
- Record: 9–3 (5–2 SEC)
- Head coach: Johnny Majors (15th season)
- Offensive coordinator: Phillip Fulmer (3rd season)
- Defensive coordinator: Larry Lacewell (2nd season)
- Captains: Earnest Fields; John Fisher
- Home stadium: Neyland Stadium

1991 Southeastern Conference football standings
	Conf.					Overall
Team	W		L		T	W		L		T
No. 7 Florida $	7	–	0	–	0	10	–	2	–	0
No. 5 Alabama	6	–	1	–	0	11	–	1	–	0
No. 14 Tennessee	5	–	2	–	0	9	–	3	–	0
No. 17 Georgia	4	–	3	–	0	9	–	3	–	0
Mississippi State	4	–	3	–	0	7	–	5	–	0
LSU	3	–	4	–	0	5	–	6	–	0
Vanderbilt	3	–	4	–	0	5	–	6	–	0
Auburn	2	–	5	–	0	5	–	6	–	0
Ole Miss	1	–	6	–	0	5	–	6	–	0
Kentucky	0	–	7	–	0	3	–	8	–	0
$ – Conference champion; Rankings from AP Poll

The 1991 Tennessee Volunteers football team represented the University of Tennessee in the 1991 NCAA Division I-A football season. Playing as a member of the Southeastern Conference (SEC), the team was led by head coach Johnny Majors, in his 15th year, and played their home games at Neyland Stadium in Knoxville, Tennessee. They finished the season with a record of nine wins and three losses (9–3 overall, 5–2 in the SEC) and with a loss against Penn State in the Fiesta Bowl. The Volunteers offense scored 352 points while the defense allowed 263 points.

== Schedule ==
Date	Time	Opponent	Rank	Site	TV	Result	Attendance	Source
September 5	8:00 p.m.	at Louisville*	No. 11	Cardinal Stadium; Louisville, KY	ESPN	W 28–11	40,457	
September 14	12:30 p.m.	No. 21 UCLA*	No. 11	Neyland Stadium; Knoxville, TN	TBS	W 30–16	97,117	
September 21	12:30 p.m.	No. 23 Mississippi State	No. 6	Neyland Stadium; Knoxville, TN	TBS	W 26–24	95,974	
September 28	7:30 p.m.	No. 13 Auburn	No. 5	Neyland Stadium; Knoxville, TN	ESPN	W 30–21	97,731	
October 12	7:30 p.m.	at No. 10 Florida	No. 4	Ben Hill Griffin Stadium; Gainesville, FL (rivalry)	ESPN	L 18–35	85,135	
October 19	3:30 p.m.	at No. 14 Alabama	No. 8	Legion Field; Birmingham, AL (Third Saturday in October)	ABC	L 19–24	86,293	
November 2	4:00 p.m.	Memphis State*^{†}	No. 14	Neyland Stadium; Knoxville, TN	PPV	W 52–24	96,664	
November 9	2:30 p.m.	at No. 5 Notre Dame*	No. 13	Notre Dame Stadium; Notre Dame, IN	NBC	W 35–34	59,075	
November 16	4:00 p.m.	Ole Miss	No. 10	Neyland Stadium; Knoxville, TN (rivalry)	PPV	W 36–25	95,937	
November 23	12:30 p.m.	at Kentucky	No. 10	Commonwealth Stadium; Lexington, KY (rivalry)	TBS	W 16–7	57,125	
November 30	12:30 p.m.	Vanderbilt	No. 9	Neyland Stadium; Knoxville, TN (rivalry)	SPS	W 45–0	94,976	
January 1	3:30 p.m.	vs. No. 6 Penn State*	No. 10	Sun Devil Stadium; Tempe, AZ (Fiesta Bowl)	NBC	L 17–42	71,133	
*Non-conference game; ^{†}Homecoming; Rankings from AP Poll released prior to the game; All times are in Eastern time

== Roster ==
1991 Tennessee Volunteers football team roster
Players
Coaches
Offense

Pos.	#	Name	Class
TE	81	Mark Adams	Sr
OT	75	Bernard Dafney	Sr
C	51	John Fisher	Sr
WR	12	Cory Fleming	So
QB	8	Andy Kelly	Sr
OT	65	Patrick Lenoir	Sr
G	58	Tom Myslinski	Jr
WR	15	Carl Pickens	Jr
RB	33	James Stewart	Fr
G	59	Mike Stowell	Jr
QB	21	Heath Shuler	Fr

Defense

Pos.	#	Name	Class
DB	26	David Bennett	Jr
DB	18	Dale Carter	Sr
LB	23	Earnest Fields	Sr
LB	87	Darryl Hardy	Sr
DE	58	Todd Kelly	Jr
DB	25	Jeremy Lincoln	Sr
DE	93	Chris Mims	Sr
DE	56	Chuck Smith	Sr
DT	48	J. J. Surlas	Jr
DB		Dave Thomas	Sr

Special teams

Pos.	#	Name	Class
P	20	Joey Chapman	So

Head coach

- Johnny Majors

Coordinators/assistant coaches

- Phillip Fulmer – Offensive coordinator/offensive line
- David Cutcliffe – Quarterbacks
- Charlie Coe – Running backs
- Randy Sanders – Wide receivers/tight ends
- Larry Lacewell – Defensive coordinator
- Rex Norris – Defensive line
- John Chavis – Linebackers
- Tim Keane – Defensive backs

Legend

- (C) Team captain
- (S) Suspended
- (I) Ineligible
- Injured
- Redshirt

== Team players drafted into the NFL ==
Player	Position	Round	Pick	NFL club
Dale Carter	Defensive Back	1	20	Kansas City Chiefs
Chris Mims	Defensive End	1	23	San Diego Chargers
Carl Pickens	Wide Receiver	2	31	Cincinnati Bengals
Chuck Smith	Defensive End	2	51	Atlanta Falcons
Jeremy Lincoln	Defensive Back	3	80	Chicago Bears
Tom Myslinski	Guard	4	109	Dallas Cowboys
Shazzon Bradley	Defensive Tackle	9	240	Green Bay Packers
Bernard Dafney	Guard	9	247	Houston Oilers
Darryl Hardy	Linebacker	10	270	Atlanta Falcons
