= 1991 Kentucky Wildcats football team =

American college football season

1991 Kentucky Wildcats football
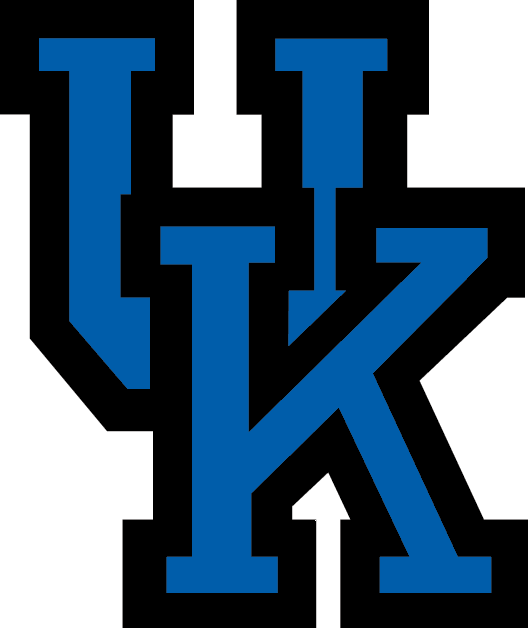
- Conference: Southeastern Conference
- Record: 3–8 (0–7 SEC)
- Head coach: Bill Curry (2nd season)
- Offensive coordinator: Rick Rhoades (1st season)
- Offensive scheme: Multiple
- Defensive coordinator: Larry New (2nd season)
- Base defense: 4–3
- Home stadium: Commonwealth Stadium

1991 Southeastern Conference football standings
	Conf.					Overall
Team	W		L		T	W		L		T
No. 7 Florida $	7	–	0	–	0	10	–	2	–	0
No. 5 Alabama	6	–	1	–	0	11	–	1	–	0
No. 14 Tennessee	5	–	2	–	0	9	–	3	–	0
No. 17 Georgia	4	–	3	–	0	9	–	3	–	0
Mississippi State	4	–	3	–	0	7	–	5	–	0
LSU	3	–	4	–	0	5	–	6	–	0
Vanderbilt	3	–	4	–	0	5	–	6	–	0
Auburn	2	–	5	–	0	5	–	6	–	0
Ole Miss	1	–	6	–	0	5	–	6	–	0
Kentucky	0	–	7	–	0	3	–	8	–	0
$ – Conference champion; Rankings from AP Poll

The 1991 Kentucky Wildcats football team represented the University of Kentucky in the Southeastern Conference (SEC) during the 1991 NCAA Division I-A football season. In their second season under head coach Bill Curry, the Wildcats compiled a 3–8 record (0–7 against SEC opponents), finished in last place in the SEC, and were outscored by their opponents, 268 to 190. The team played its home games in Commonwealth Stadium in Lexington, Kentucky.

The team's statistical leaders included Pookie Jones with 954 passing yards, Terry Samuels with 307 rushing yards, and Neal Clark with 647 receiving yards.

== Schedule ==
Date	Opponent	Site	Result	Attendance	Source
September 7	Miami (OH)*	Commonwealth Stadium; Lexington, KY	W 23–20	58,100	
September 21	at Indiana*	Memorial Stadium; Bloomington, IN (rivalry)	L 10–13	48,994	
September 28	Kent State*	Commonwealth Stadium; Lexington, KY	W 24–6	56,150	
October 5	Ole Miss	Commonwealth Stadium; Lexington, KY	L 14–35	56,375	
October 12	at Mississippi State	Scott Field; Starkville, MS	L 6–31	32,103	
October 19	LSU	Commonwealth Stadium; Lexington, KY	L 26–29	53,650	
October 26	at No. 24 Georgia	Sanford Stadium; Athens, GA	L 27–49	85,312	
November 2	Cincinnati*	Commonwealth Stadium; Lexington, KY	W 20–17	45,850	
November 9	at Vanderbilt	Vanderbilt Stadium; Nashville, TN (rivalry)	L 7–17	40,168	
November 16	at No. 5 Florida	Ben Hill Griffin Stadium; Gainesville, FL (rivalry)	L 26–35	84,109	
November 23	No. 10 Tennessee	Commonwealth Stadium; Lexington, KY (rivalry)	L 7–16	57,125	
*Non-conference game; Rankings from AP Poll released prior to the game

== Roster ==
1991 Kentucky Wildcats football team roster
Players
Coaches
Offense

Pos.	#	Name	Class
[[American football positions|]]
[[American football positions|]]

Defense

Pos.	#	Name	Class
[[American football positions|]]

Special teams

Pos.	#	Name	Class

}}

Head coach

- [[]]

Coordinators/assistant coaches

Legend

- (C) Team captain
- (S) Suspended
- (I) Ineligible
- Injured
- Redshirt
