= 1991 LSU Tigers football team =

American college football season

1991 LSU Tigers football
- Conference: Southeastern Conference
- Record: 5–6 (3–4 SEC)
- Head coach: Curley Hallman (1st season)
- Offensive coordinator: George Haffner (1st season)
- Offensive scheme: Multiple
- Defensive coordinator: Michael Bugar (1st season)
- Base defense: 3–4
- Home stadium: Tiger Stadium

1991 Southeastern Conference football standings
	Conf.					Overall
Team	W		L		T	W		L		T
No. 7 Florida $	7	–	0	–	0	10	–	2	–	0
No. 5 Alabama	6	–	1	–	0	11	–	1	–	0
No. 14 Tennessee	5	–	2	–	0	9	–	3	–	0
No. 17 Georgia	4	–	3	–	0	9	–	3	–	0
Mississippi State	4	–	3	–	0	7	–	5	–	0
LSU	3	–	4	–	0	5	–	6	–	0
Vanderbilt	3	–	4	–	0	5	–	6	–	0
Auburn	2	–	5	–	0	5	–	6	–	0
Ole Miss	1	–	6	–	0	5	–	6	–	0
Kentucky	0	–	7	–	0	3	–	8	–	0
$ – Conference champion; Rankings from AP Poll

The 1991 LSU Tigers football team represented Louisiana State University (LSU) during the 1991 NCAA Division I-A football season. The team was led by Curley Hallman in his first season and finished with an overall record of five wins and six losses (5–6 overall, 3–4 in the SEC).

== Schedule ==
Date	Time	Opponent	Site	TV	Result	Attendance	Source
September 7	2:30 p.m.	at Georgia	Sanford Stadium; Athens, GA	ABC	L 10–31	85,434	
September 14	12:00 p.m.	at No. 20 Texas A&M*	Kyle Field; College Station, TX (rivalry)	Raycom	L 7–45	66,281	
September 21	7:00 p.m.	Vanderbilt	Tiger Stadium; Baton Rouge, LA		W 16–14	64,341	
October 5	7:00 p.m.	No. 13 Florida	Tiger Stadium; Baton Rouge, LA (rivalry)	PPV	L 0–16	72,019	
October 12	7:00 p.m.	Arkansas State*	Tiger Stadium; Baton Rouge, LA		W 70–14	62,024	
October 19	2:30 p.m.	at Kentucky	Commonwealth Stadium; Lexington, KY	TBS	W 29–26	53,650	
October 26	6:30 p.m.	No. 1 Florida State*	Tiger Stadium; Baton Rouge, LA	ESPN	L 16–27	71,019	
November 2	1:00 p.m.	at Ole Miss	Mississippi Veterans Memorial Stadium; Jackson, MS (rivalry)	PPV	W 25–22	41,000	
November 9	2:30 p.m.	No. 8 Alabama	Tiger Stadium; Baton Rouge, LA (rivalry)	ABC	L 17–20	78,838	
November 16	7:00 p.m.	Mississippi State^{†}	Tiger Stadium; Baton Rouge, LA (rivalry)	PPV	L 19–28	67,724	
November 23	7:00 p.m.	at Tulane*	Louisiana Superdome; New Orleans, LA (Battle for the Rag)		W 39–20	38,384	
*Non-conference game; ^{†}Homecoming; Rankings from AP Poll released prior to the game; All times are in Central time

== Roster ==
1991 LSU Tigers football team roster
Players
Coaches
Offense

Pos.	#	Name	Class
QB	16	Chad Loup	So
RB	33	Odell Beckham Sr.	Jr
SE	49	Todd Kinchen	Sr
C	52	Kevin Mawae	So
QB	10	Brad Strohm	So

Defense

Pos.	#	Name	Class
ILB	13	Ricardo Washington	So
FS	14	Anthony Marshall	So
SS	19	Corey Raymond	Sr
OLB	35	Roovelroe Swan	So
NG	64	Scott Wharton	Jr
ILB	85	David Walkup	So
NG	96	Bo Davis	Jr

Special teams

Pos.	#	Name	Class
K	6	Pedro Suarez	Jr
P	87	Brian Griffith	Sr

Head coach

- Curley Hallman

Coordinators/assistant coaches

- George Haffner – Offensive coordinator/quarterbacks
- Steve Buckley – Running backs
- Larry Edmonson – Wide receiver
- Darrell Dickey – Tight ends
- Buddy King – Offensive line
- Michael Bugar – Defensive coordinator/defensive line
- Thielen Smith – Inside linebackers
- Phil Bennett – Outside linebackers/defensive ends
- Steve Davis – Special teams coordinator/defensive backs

Legend

- (C) Team captain
- (S) Suspended
- (I) Ineligible
- Injured
- Redshirt

Roster

== After the season ==
=== NFL draft ===
The following Tigers were selected in the 1992 NFL draft after the season.

Round	Pick	Player	Position	NFL team
3	57	Marc Boutte	Defensive tackle	Los Angeles Rams
3	60	Todd Kinchen	Wide receiver	Los Angeles Rams
