= LSU–Mississippi State football rivalry =

American college football rivalry

- LSU Tigers Mississippi State Bulldogs
- First meeting: November 20, 1896; LSU, 52–0
- Latest meeting: October 17, 2026; LSU, 31–0
- Next meeting: 2028

Statistics
- Total meetings: 118
- All-time series: LSU leads 76–36–3
- Largest victory: LSU, 55–0 (1967) & 61–6 (1969)
- Longest win streak: LSU, 14 (2000–2013)
- Current win streak: LSU, 4 (2021–present)

Locations of LSU and Mississippi State

The LSU–Mississippi State football rivalry, sometimes informally known as Cowbells vs. Cajuns, is an American college football rivalry between the LSU Tigers and Mississippi State Bulldogs. Both universities are founding members of the Southeastern Conference (SEC). With a total of 117 meetings, this rivalry is LSU's longest and Mississippi State's second-longest behind the Egg Bowl (vs. Ole Miss). The first meeting was in 1896 with LSU leading the series overall with a record of 76–36–3.

== History ==
From 1923 to 1930, every game was played in the state of Mississippi. LSU hosted every game from 1934 to 1957, and only four games in the series were played outside of Baton Rouge from 1934 to 1973 in order for State to realize a larger gate by playing at Tiger Stadium, which had a much larger capacity than the Bulldogs' home fields in Starkville and Jackson (from 1953–71, Tiger Stadium was the SEC's largest facility).

Due to SEC expansion, the schools did not play in 2024 and 2025, the first break in the series since 1943, when the Maroons did not field a team during World War II. The 2024 season marked the first time since 1925 the schools did not meet in a season in which both fielded a team.

LSU and Mississippi State were not selected as yearly opponents for 2026–29 under the SEC's nine-game conference schedule format. The series will be played in 2026 at Baton Rouge and 2028 at Starkville.

== Notable games ==
- 1982: Hosting LSU in Starkville for the first time since 1923, the Bulldogs stunned the 7–0–1 Tigers 27–24. LSU was one week removed from a 20–10 victory vs. Alabama in Birmingham, the Tigers' first over the Crimson Tide since 1970.
- 1991: William "Sleepy" Robinson led Mississippi State to a 28–19 victory in Tiger Stadium. LSU's Todd Kinchen had a then-school record 248 receiving yards in the loss.
- 1999: The #7 Bulldogs gutted out a 17–16 win over the Tigers at Scott Field. Rod Gibson the clinching touchdown in closing minutes.
- 2000: After falling behind 31–17, the Tigers rallied to beat the Bulldogs 45–38 in overtime.
- 2009: Mississippi State outgained the Tigers by over 100 yards and drove down to the 1 yard line in the final minute, but a goal-line stand by LSU saved the lead for a 30–26 Tiger win.
- 2014: Dak Prescott led the then-unranked Bulldogs to a 34–29 upset in Baton Rouge, ending the Tigers' 14-game win streak in the series. The Bulldogs actually led 34–10 in the fourth quarter, but LSU scored 3 late touchdowns to almost close the gap. However, the Tigers' Hail Mary on the final play was intercepted by Will Redmond. Josh Robinson ran for 197 yards for the Bulldogs. This was Mississippi State's first win over LSU since 1999, and their first on the road in Baton Rouge since 1991. Mississippi State reached #1 in the rankings a few weeks later, and finished 10–3 on the season.
- 2017: LSU came into Starkville ranked #12 under first-year head coach Ed Orgeron, but it was the unranked Bulldogs who won in a 37–7 rout. Nick Fitzgerald threw two touchdown passes and ran in two more, and the Bulldogs outgained the Tigers 465–270. It was also the first win over LSU at home in Starkville for the Bulldogs since 1999 and the first time they beat a ranked LSU team there since 1984.
- 2022: Brian Kelly, in his SEC debut for the Tigers, led the team to a 31–16 comeback victory in Tiger Stadium. LSU Nickel Back Jay Ward earned SEC Defensive Player of the Week honors following his impressive performance. Ward finished with 11 tackles, along with 1.5 tackles for loss and the game-sealing interception.

== Game results ==
| LSU victories | Mississippi State victories | Tie games | Forfeits/Vacated wins |

| No. | Date | Location | Winner | Score |
|---|---|---|---|---|
| 1 | November 20, 1896 | Baton Rouge, LA | LSU | 52–0 |
| 2 | November 27, 1902 | Starkville, MS | LSU | 6–0 |
| 3 | November 7, 1903 | Starkville, MS | Mississippi A&M | 11–0 |
| 4 | December 1, 1905 | Baton Rouge, LA | LSU | 15–0 |
| 5 | October 27, 1906 | Columbus, MS | Tie | 0–0 |
| 6 | November 9, 1907 | Baton Rouge, LA | LSU | 23–11 |
| 7 | November 7, 1908 | Baton Rouge, LA | LSU | 50–0 |
| 8 | October 16, 1909 | Baton Rouge, LA | LSU | 15–0 |
| 9 | October 21, 1910 | Columbus, MS | Mississippi A&M | 3–0 |
| 10 | November 11, 1911 | Gulfport, MS | Mississippi A&M | 6–0 |
| 11 | November 2, 1912 | Baton Rouge, LA | Mississippi A&M | 7–0 |
| 12 | November 15, 1913 | Starkville, MS | Tie | 0–0 |
| 13 | October 30, 1915 | Baton Rouge, LA | LSU | 10–0 |
| 14 | November 11, 1916 | Starkville, MS | LSU | 13–3 |
| 15 | November 17, 1917 | Baton Rouge, LA | Mississippi A&M | 9–0 |
| 16 | November 1, 1919 | Starkville, MS | Mississippi A&M | 6–0 |
| 17 | October 23, 1920 | Baton Rouge, LA | Mississippi A&M | 12–7 |
| 18 | December 3, 1921 | Starkville, MS | LSU | 17–14 |
| 19 | November 18, 1922 | Baton Rouge, LA | Mississippi A&M | 7–0 |
| 20 | December 1, 1923 | Starkville, MS | Mississippi A&M | 14–7 |
| 21 | October 23, 1926 | Jackson, MS | Mississippi A&M | 7–6 |
| 22 | October 22, 1927 | Jackson, MS | LSU | 9–7 |
| 23 | October 20, 1928 | Jackson, MS | LSU | 31–0 |
| 24 | October 19, 1929 | Jackson, MS | LSU | 31–6 |
| 25 | October 18, 1930 | Jackson, MS | Mississippi A&M | 8–6 |
| 26 | October 17, 1931 | Baton Rouge, LA | LSU | 31–0 |
| 27 | October 15, 1932 | Monroe, LA | LSU | 24–0 |
| 28 | November 25, 1933 | Monroe. LA | LSU | 21–6 |
| 29 | November 3, 1934 | Baton Rouge, LA | LSU | 25–3 |
| 30 | November 9, 1935 | Baton Rouge, LA | LSU | 28–13 |
| 31 | November 7, 1936 | Baton Rouge, LA | #7 LSU | 12–0 |
| 32 | November 6, 1937 | Baton Rouge, LA | #18 LSU | 41–0 |
| 33 | November 5, 1938 | Baton Rouge, LA | LSU | 32–7 |
| 34 | November 11, 1939 | Baton Rouge, LA | Mississippi State | 15–12 |
| 35 | November 9, 1940 | Baton Rouge, LA | #19 Mississippi State | 22–7 |
| 36 | October 11, 1941 | Baton Rouge, LA | Tie | 0–0 |
| 37 | October 10, 1942 | Baton Rouge, LA | LSU | 16–6 |
| 38 | October 21, 1944 | Baton Rouge, LA | Mississippi State | 13–6 |
| 39 | November 10, 1945 | Baton Rouge, LA | Mississippi State | 27–20 |
| 40 | October 5, 1946 | Baton Rouge, LA | LSU | 13–6 |
| 41 | November 15, 1947 | Baton Rouge, LA | LSU | 21–6 |
| 42 | November 13, 1948 | Baton Rouge, LA | Mississippi State | 7–0 |
| 43 | November 12, 1949 | Baton Rouge, LA | #16 LSU | 34–7 |
| 44 | November 18, 1950 | Baton Rouge, LA | Mississippi State | 13–7 |
| 45 | November 17, 1951 | Baton Rouge, LA | LSU | 3–0 |
| 46 | November 15, 1952 | Baton Rouge, LA | Mississippi State | 33–14 |
| 47 | November 14, 1953 | Baton Rouge, LA | Mississippi State | 26–13 |
| 48 | November 13, 1954 | Baton Rouge, LA | Mississippi State | 25–0 |
| 49 | November 12, 1955 | Baton Rouge, LA | LSU | 34–7 |
| 50 | November 17, 1956 | Baton Rouge, LA | Mississippi State | 32–13 |
| 51 | November 16, 1957 | Baton Rouge, LA | #12 Mississippi State | 14–6 |
| 52 | November 15, 1958 | Jackson, MS | #1 LSU | 7–6 |
| 53 | November 14, 1959 | Baton Rouge, LA | #3 LSU | 27–0 |
| 54 | November 12, 1960 | Baton Rouge, LA | LSU | 7–3 |
| 55 | November 18, 1961 | Baton Rouge, LA | #4 LSU | 14–6 |
| 56 | November 17, 1962 | Jackson, MS | #10 LSU | 28–0 |
| 57 | November 16, 1963 | Jackson, MS | Mississippi State | 7–6 |
| 58 | November 14, 1964 | Baton Rouge, LA | #9 LSU | 14–10 |
| 59 | November 13, 1965 | Baton Rouge, LA | LSU | 37–20 |
| 60 | November 12, 1966 | Baton Rouge, LA | LSU | 17–7 |

| No. | Date | Location | Winner | Score |
|---|---|---|---|---|
| 61 | November 18, 1967 | Baton Rouge, LA | LSU | 55–0 |
| 62 | November 16, 1968 | Baton Rouge, LA | LSU | 20–16 |
| 63 | November 15, 1969 | Baton Rouge, LA | #12 LSU | 61–6 |
| 64 | November 14, 1970 | Baton Rouge, LA | #9 LSU | 38–7 |
| 65 | November 13, 1971 | Jackson, MS | #20 LSU | 28–3 |
| 66 | November 18, 1972 | Baton Rouge, LA | #8 LSU | 28–14 |
| 67 | November 17, 1973 | Baton Rouge, LA | #7 LSU | 26–7 |
| 68 | November 16, 1974 | Jackson, MS | Mississippi State | 7–6 |
| 69 | November 15, 1975 | Baton Rouge, LA | Mississippi State† | 16–6 |
| 70 | November 13, 1976 | Jackson, MS | Mississippi State† | 21–13 |
| 71 | November 12, 1977 | Baton Rouge, LA | LSU | 27–24 |
| 72 | November 18, 1978 | Jackson, MS | Mississippi State | 16–14 |
| 73 | November 17, 1979 | Baton Rouge, LA | LSU | 21–3 |
| 74 | November 15, 1980 | Jackson, MS | #19 Mississippi State | 55–31 |
| 75 | November 14, 1981 | Baton Rouge, LA | Mississippi State | 17–9 |
| 76 | November 13, 1982 | Starkville, MS | Mississippi State | 27–24 |
| 77 | November 12, 1983 | Baton Rouge, LA | Mississippi State | 45–26 |
| 78 | November 17, 1984 | Starkville, MS | Mississippi State | 16–14 |
| 79 | November 16, 1985 | Baton Rouge, LA | #19 LSU | 17–15 |
| 80 | November 15, 1986 | Jackson, MS | #12 LSU | 47–0 |
| 81 | November 14, 1987 | Baton Rouge, LA | #10 LSU | 34–14 |
| 82 | November 12, 1988 | Starkville, MS | #12 LSU | 20–3 |
| 83 | November 18, 1989 | Baton Rouge, LA | LSU | 44–20 |
| 84 | November 17, 1990 | Jackson, MS | Mississippi State | 34–22 |
| 85 | November 16, 1991 | Baton Rouge, LA | Mississippi State | 28–19 |
| 86 | September 12, 1992 | Baton Rouge, LA | LSU | 24–3 |
| 87 | September 11, 1993 | Starkville, MS | LSU | 18–16 |
| 88 | September 10, 1994 | Baton Rouge, LA | LSU | 44–24 |
| 89 | September 9, 1995 | Starkville, MS | LSU | 34–16 |
| 90 | October 26, 1996 | Baton Rouge, LA | #13 LSU | 28–20 |
| 91 | September 13, 1997 | Starkville, MS | #10 LSU | 24–9 |
| 92 | October 24, 1998 | Baton Rouge, LA | LSU | 41–6 |
| 93 | October 23, 1999 | Starkville, MS | #12 Mississippi State | 17–16 |
| 94 | October 21, 2000 | Baton Rouge, LA | LSU | 45–38^{OT} |
| 95 | October 20, 2001 | Starkville, MS | LSU | 42–0 |
| 96 | September 28, 2002 | Baton Rouge, LA | #22 LSU | 31–13 |
| 97 | September 27, 2003 | Starkville, MS | #7 LSU | 41–6 |
| 98 | September 25, 2004 | Baton Rouge, LA | #13 LSU | 51–0 |
| 99 | October 1, 2005 | Starkville, MS | #4 LSU | 37–7 |
| 100 | September 30, 2006 | Baton Rouge, LA | #9 LSU | 48–17 |
| 101 | August 30, 2007 | Starkville, MS | #2 LSU | 45–0 |
| 102 | September 27, 2008 | Baton Rouge, LA | #5 LSU | 34–24 |
| 103 | September 26, 2009 | Starkville, MS | #7 LSU | 30–26 |
| 104 | September 18, 2010 | Baton Rouge, LA | #15 LSU | 29–7 |
| 105 | September 15, 2011 | Starkville, MS | #3 LSU | 19–6 |
| 106 | November 10, 2012 | Baton Rouge, LA | #9 LSU^{*} | 37–17 |
| 107 | October 5, 2013 | Starkville, MS | #10 LSU^{*} | 59–26 |
| 108 | September 20, 2014 | Baton Rouge, LA | Mississippi State | 34–29 |
| 109 | September 12, 2015 | Starkville, MS | #14 LSU^{*} | 21–19 |
| 110 | September 17, 2016 | Baton Rouge, LA | #20 LSU | 23–20 |
| 111 | September 16, 2017 | Starkville, MS | Mississippi State | 37–7 |
| 112 | October 20, 2018 | Baton Rouge, LA | #5 LSU | 19–3 |
| 113 | October 19, 2019 | Starkville, MS | #2 LSU | 36–13 |
| 114 | September 26, 2020 | Baton Rouge, LA | Mississippi State | 44–34 |
| 115 | September 25, 2021 | Starkville, MS | LSU | 28–25 |
| 116 | September 17, 2022 | Baton Rouge, LA | LSU | 31–16 |
| 117 | September 16, 2023 | Starkville, MS | #14 LSU | 41–14 |
| 118 | October 17, 2026 | Baton Rouge, LA | #21 LSU | 31–0 |
Series: LSU leads 76–36–3
* LSU was later forced to vacate as part of NCAA penalties † Mississippi State was later forced to forfeit as part of NCAA penalties

== See also ==
- List of NCAA college football rivalry games
- List of most-played college football series in NCAA Division I
