= Larry Tharpe =

American football player (born 1970)

No. 71
- Position: Offensive tackle

Personal information
- Born: November 19, 1970 (age 55); Macon, Georgia, U.S.
- Listed height: 6 ft 4 in (1.93 m)
- Listed weight: 300 lb (136 kg)

Career information
- High school: Southwest (Macon)
- College: Tennessee State
- NFL draft: 1992: 6th round, 145th overall pick

Career history
- Detroit Lions (1992–1994); Arizona Cardinals (1995); New England Patriots (1996); Detroit Lions (1997–1998); Pittsburgh Steelers (2000)

Career NFL statistics
- Games played: 76
- Games started: 48
- Fumble recoveries: 1
- Stats at Pro Football Reference

Larry James Tharpe (born November 19, 1970) is an American former professional football player who was an offensive tackle in the National Football League (NFL). He played college football for the Tennessee State Tigers and was selected by the Detroit Lions in the sixth round of the 1992 NFL draft.

After two seasons with the Lions, Tharpe played one season for the Arizona Cardinals, then returned to the Lions for another two seasons, and finished his career with the Pittsburgh Steelers for one final season.

== Professional career ==
Tharpe was drafted by the Detroit Lions in the sixth round (145th overall) of the 1992 NFL draft. He signed his rookie contract with the team on July 24, 1992. He was placed on injured reserve before the start of the 1992 season, but was activated from the list on September 30. He played in the remaining 11 games of the season as a reserve. He played in 5 games in 1993, starting in 3 of them. He re-signed with the Lions on July 26, 1994, but spent the entire season on injured reserve.

Tharpe signed a one-year $1 million contract with the Arizona Cardinals in 1995. His agent Jim Ryan was the son of Cardinals head coach Buddy Ryan. He started all 16 games of the season at one of the tackle spots.

Tharpe signed with the New England Patriots in 1996. He was inactive for the first seven games of the season before he was waived on October 24, 1996.

Tharpe was the starting right tackle for the Lions for 15 games in 1997, and helped running back Barry Sanders become the third player in NFL history to rush for over 2,000 yards during the season. Sanders won the NFL Most Valuable Player award after the season, and was named to the Pro Bowl. He invited Tharpe and the rest of the Lions' offensive line to Hawaii to join him, and gifted them gold bracelets commemorating the historic season. Tharpe re-signed with the Lions on a one-year contract on June 11, 1998. He played in all 16 games in 1998, and started at right tackle in 9 of them.

Tharpe was signed by the Pittsburgh Steelers on April 4, 2000. He played in 12 games in 2000, and started at right tackle in 5 games. He was released by the Steelers on September 1, 2001.

== Personal ==
Tharpe was a member of a class-action lawsuit against the NFL for concussion-related injuries while he was a player.
