= 1991 Auburn Tigers football team =

American college football season

1991 Auburn Tigers football
- Conference: Southeastern Conference
- Record: 5–6 (2–5 SEC)
- Head coach: Pat Dye (11th season)
- Offensive coordinator: Tommy Bowden (1st season)
- Defensive coordinator: Wayne Hall (6th season)
- Home stadium: Jordan–Hare Stadium; Legion Field

1991 Southeastern Conference football standings
	Conf.					Overall
Team	W		L		T	W		L		T
No. 7 Florida $	7	–	0	–	0	10	–	2	–	0
No. 5 Alabama	6	–	1	–	0	11	–	1	–	0
No. 14 Tennessee	5	–	2	–	0	9	–	3	–	0
No. 17 Georgia	4	–	3	–	0	9	–	3	–	0
Mississippi State	4	–	3	–	0	7	–	5	–	0
LSU	3	–	4	–	0	5	–	6	–	0
Vanderbilt	3	–	4	–	0	5	–	6	–	0
Auburn	2	–	5	–	0	5	–	6	–	0
Ole Miss	1	–	6	–	0	5	–	6	–	0
Kentucky	0	–	7	–	0	3	–	8	–	0
$ – Conference champion; Rankings from AP Poll

The 1991 Auburn Tigers football team represented Auburn University as a member of the Southeastern Conference during the 1991 NCAA Division I-A football season. Led by 11th-year head coach Pat Dye, the Tigers compiled an overall record of 5–6, with a mark of 2–5 in conference play, and finished in eighth place in the SEC.

== Schedule ==
Date	Time	Opponent	Rank	Site	TV	Result	Attendance	Source
August 31	5:30 p.m.	No. 1 (I-AA) Georgia Southern*	No. 17	Jordan-Hare Stadium; Auburn, AL		W 32–17	79,124	
September 14	6:00 p.m.	Ole Miss	No. 15	Jordan-Hare Stadium; Auburn, AL (rivalry)	PPV	W 23–13	81,622	
September 21	6:00 p.m.	at Texas*	No. 13	Texas Memorial Stadium; Austin, TX	ESPN	W 14–10	77,809	
September 28	6:30 p.m.	at No. 5 Tennessee	No. 13	Neyland Stadium; Knoxville, TN (rivalry)	ESPN	L 21–30	97,731	
October 5	11:30 a.m.	Southern Miss*	No. 16	Jordan-Hare Stadium; Auburn, AL	TBS	L 9–10	79,793	
October 12	7:00 p.m.	at Vanderbilt	No. 24	Vanderbilt Stadium; Nashville, TN		W 24–22	32,772	
October 26	2:30 p.m.	Mississippi State^{†}		Jordan-Hare Stadium; Auburn, AL	ABC	L 17–24	82,214	
November 2	2:30 p.m.	No. 6 Florida		Jordan-Hare Stadium; Auburn, AL (rivalry)	ABC	L 10–31	83,714	
November 9	12:30 p.m.	Southwestern Louisiana*		Jordan-Hare Stadium; Auburn, AL		W 50–7	62,557	
November 16	11:30 a.m.	at Georgia		Sanford Stadium; Athens, GA (rivalry)	TBS	L 27–37	85,434	
November 30	3:00 p.m.	No. 8 Alabama		Legion Field; Birmingham, AL (Iron Bowl)	ESPN	L 6–13	83,091	
*Non-conference game; ^{†}Homecoming; Rankings from AP Poll released prior to the game; All times are in Central time

== Roster ==
1991 Auburn Tigers football team roster
Players
Coaches
Offense

Pos.	#	Name	Class
QB	11	Stan White	So
WR	18	Thomas Bailey	Fr
FB	40	Tony Richardson	So
OT	65	Anthony Redmon	So
G	66	Eddie Blake	Sr
OT	68	Chris Gray	Jr
C	70	Bob Meeks	Sr
OT	74	Wayne Gandy	So
WR	80	Otis Thornton	Fr
TE	82	Jess Simpson	So
WR	83	Lou Priester	Sr
WR	84	Tony Russell	Jr
TE	85	Fred Baxter	Jr
TE	87	Victor Hall	Sr

Defense

Pos.	#	Name	Class
LB	51	James Willis	So

Special teams

Pos.	#	Name	Class
K	3	Jim Von Wyl	Sr

Head coach

- Pat Dye

Coordinators/assistant coaches

Legend

- (C) Team captain
- (S) Suspended
- (I) Ineligible
- Injured
- Redshirt

Roster

== After the season ==
=== NFL draft ===
The following Tigers were selected in the 1992 NFL draft after the season.

Round	Pick	Player	Position	NFL team
2	43	Eddie Blake	Defensive tackle	Miami Dolphins
5	129	Corey Barlow	Defensive back	Philadelphia Eagles
10	278	Bob Meeks	Center	Denver Broncos
