= Ray Goff =

American football player and coach (born 1955)

Biographical details
- Born: July 10, 1955 (age 71); Moultrie, Georgia, U.S.

Playing career
- 1974–1976: Georgia
- Position: Quarterback

Coaching career (HC unless noted)
- 1979–1980: South Carolina (assistant)
- 1981–1988: Georgia (assistant)
- 1989–1995: Georgia

Head coaching record
- Overall: 46–34–1
- Bowls: 2–2

Accomplishments and honors

Awards
- SEC Player of the Year (1976); First-team All-SEC (1976); Florida–Georgia Hall of Fame

James Rayford Goff Jr. (born July 10, 1955) is an American former college football player and coach. He served as the head coach at the University of Georgia from 1989 to 1995, compiling a record of 46–34–1.

== Playing career ==
Goff attended the University of Georgia, where he played quarterback from 1974 to 1976, leading the team to 19 wins over his final two seasons under coach Vince Dooley. As a player, he was named Southeastern Conference player of the year in 1976 when the team he captained won the SEC title. He was a three-year letterman at Georgia.

== Coaching career ==
Goff served as an assistant coach for the South Carolina Gamecocks before returning to Georgia as an assistant in 1981. While an assistant at Georgia from 1981 to 1988, he held the positions of recruiting coordinator, tight ends coach, and running backs coach, and earned a reputation as an excellent recruiter. When Dooley, the winningest coach in Georgia history, retired after the 1988 season, Goff — then a 33-year-old running backs coach — was the surprise choice to succeed him.

=== Head coaching career ===
Goff's tenure got off to a slow start, with just ten wins in his first two seasons, before reeling off nine wins in 1991 and ten in 1992; the latter campaign finished with Georgia ranked eighth by the Coaches Poll. Over the next three years, Goff's teams never again posted as many as seven wins, and he was fired in 1995. His teams only made brief appearances in the Coaches Poll in 1993, 1994 and 1995, reaching #13 in the 1993 preseason polls. This would prove to be one of the final straws in Goff's tenure at Georgia. He was fired at the end of the year after a 6–6 record.

== Head coaching record ==
Year	Team	Overall	Conference	Standing	Bowl/playoffs	Coaches^{#}	AP^{°}
Georgia Bulldogs (Southeastern Conference) (1989–1995)
1989	Georgia	6–6	4–3	4th	L Peach		
1990	Georgia	4–7	2–5	7th			
1991	Georgia	9–3	4–3	4th	W Independence	19	17
1992	Georgia	10–2	6–2	T–1st (Eastern)	W Florida Citrus	8	8
1993	Georgia	5–6	2–6	4th (Eastern)			
1994	Georgia	6–4–1	3–4–1	4th (Eastern)			
1995	Georgia	6–6	3–5	3rd (Eastern)	L Peach		
Georgia:		46–34–1	24–28–1				
Total:		46–34–1					
National championship Conference title Conference division title or championship game berth
^{#}Rankings from final Coaches Poll.; ^{°}Rankings from final AP Poll.

== Quotes ==
They've gone out on a limb, there's no doubt about it.

— Goff, after his hiring in 1989

We never had a more effective option runner than Ray Goff. He appeared slow because of his size, but he was really pretty fast. He was a swivel-hipped runner with great leg strength.

— Vince Dooley, Georgia Bulldogs football head coach during Ray Goff's collegiate career.
