= 1992 Fiesta Bowl =

- 21st Fiesta Bowl
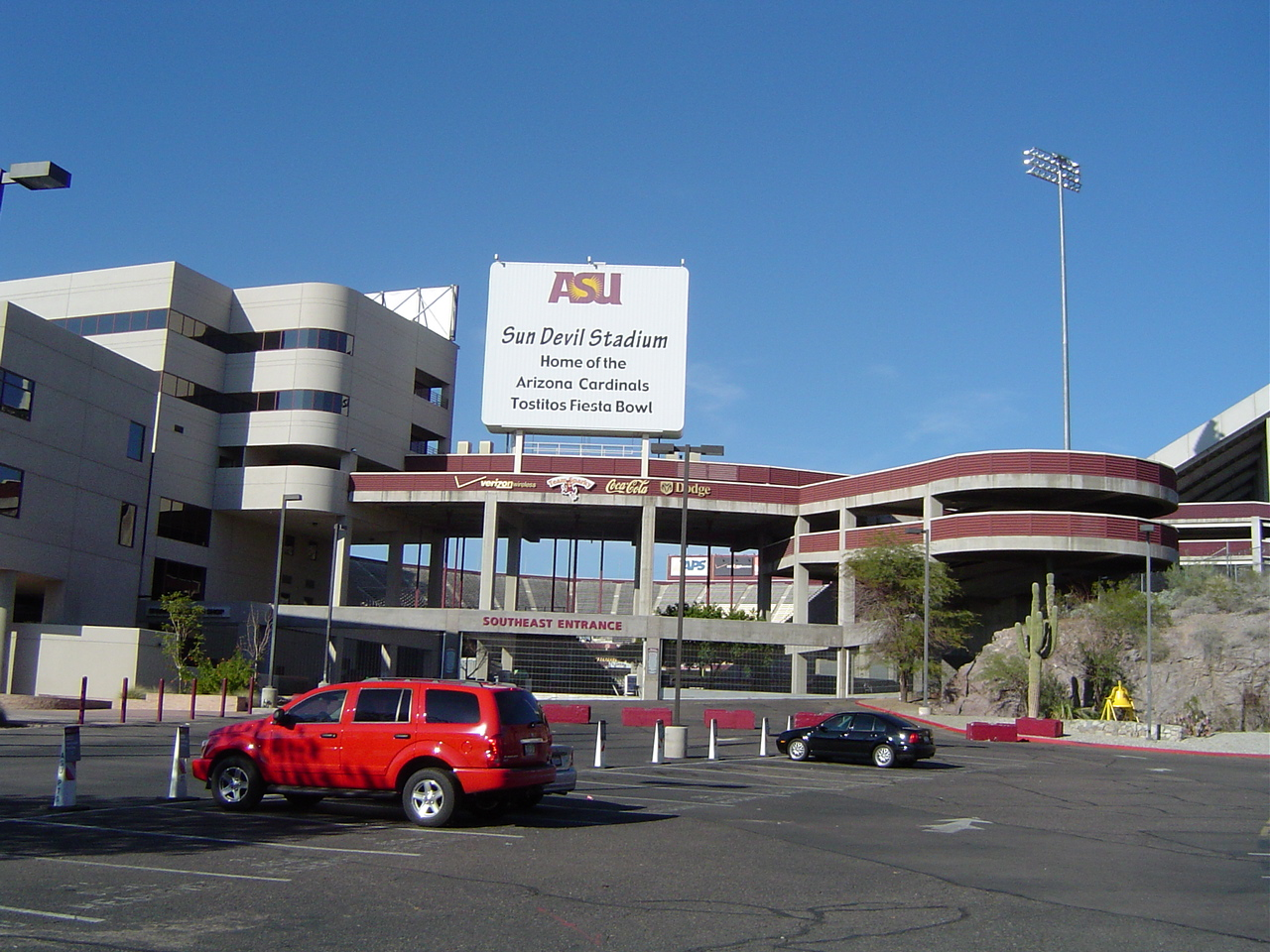
- Sun Devil Stadium in Tempe, Arizona, hosted the Fiesta Bowl.
Penn State Nittany Lions	Tennessee Volunteers
(10–2)	(9–2)
Independent	SEC
42	17
Head coach: Joe Paterno	Head coach: Johnny Majors
AP / Coaches; 6 / 5	AP / Coaches; 10 / 10
	1	2	3	4	Total
Penn State	7	0	14	21	42
Tennessee	10	0	7	0	17
- Date: January 1, 1992
- Season: 1991
- Stadium: Sun Devil Stadium
- Location: Tempe, Arizona
- MVP: WR O. J. McDuffie & LB Reggie Givens
- Referee: Dayle Phillips (ACC)
- Attendance: 71,133

United States TV coverage
- Network: NBC
- Announcers: Charlie Jones and Todd Christensen
- Nielsen ratings: 7.0

The 1992 Fiesta Bowl, was a post-season college football bowl game between the Penn State Nittany Lions and the Tennessee Volunteers, played January 1, 1992, at Sun Devil Stadium in Tempe, Arizona.

This game marked the end of Sunkist sponsorship, which had been title sponsor since 1985 and the beginning of IBM's. This game also marked Penn State's fifth appearance and Tennessee's first in the Fiesta Bowl.
