= 1991 Alabama Crimson Tide football team =

American college football season

1991 Alabama Crimson Tide football

Blockbuster Bowl champion

Blockbuster Bowl, W 30–25 vs. Colorado
- Conference: Southeastern Conference

Ranking
- Coaches: No. 5
- AP: No. 5
- Record: 11–1 (6–1 SEC)
- Head coach: Gene Stallings (2nd season)
- Offensive coordinator: Mal Moore (10th season)
- Captains: Kevin Turner; Siran Stacy; Robert Stewart; John Sullins
- Home stadium: Bryant–Denny Stadium; Legion Field

1991 Southeastern Conference football standings
	Conf.					Overall
Team	W		L		T	W		L		T
No. 7 Florida $	7	–	0	–	0	10	–	2	–	0
No. 5 Alabama	6	–	1	–	0	11	–	1	–	0
No. 14 Tennessee	5	–	2	–	0	9	–	3	–	0
No. 17 Georgia	4	–	3	–	0	9	–	3	–	0
Mississippi State	4	–	3	–	0	7	–	5	–	0
LSU	3	–	4	–	0	5	–	6	–	0
Vanderbilt	3	–	4	–	0	5	–	6	–	0
Auburn	2	–	5	–	0	5	–	6	–	0
Ole Miss	1	–	6	–	0	5	–	6	–	0
Kentucky	0	–	7	–	0	3	–	8	–	0
$ – Conference champion; Rankings from AP Poll

The 1991 Alabama Crimson Tide football team represented the University of Alabama in the 1991 NCAA Division I-A football season. The team was led by head coach Gene Stallings who was in his second season at Alabama. The team played their home games at Bryant–Denny Stadium, in Tuscaloosa, Alabama, and at Legion Field in Birmingham, Alabama. The team competed in the Southeastern Conference. The team improved upon a 7–5 record from Stallings's first season as they ended with an 11–1 overall record, while going 6–1 in their conference games. The September 21st win against Georgia would prove to be the first in a school record tying 28-game winning streak and a school record 31-game unbeaten streak.

In the opener against Temple, Chris Anderson had a 96-yard touchdown run from scrimmage, setting an all-time team record that still stands. One week later, Alabama traveled to Florida and got blown out, 35–0. It was the worst Tide loss in 34 years, since a 40–0 loss in 1957 to Auburn that ended the disastrous coaching tenure of Jennings B. Whitworth. It also cost Alabama an SEC title as the Gators went undefeated in conference play. However, it would be the last game Alabama lost until November 1993, as the next week's 10–0 victory over Georgia began a 28-game winning streak.

After lopsided victories over Vanderbilt, Chattanooga, and Tulane, the Tide started winning a series of squeakers. Against Tennessee the Tide trailed 6–3 in the fourth quarter when starting quarterback Danny Woodson left the game with a strained hamstring. Behind backup Jay Barker, Alabama rallied for three touchdowns in the fourth quarter and won 24–19. It was the Crimson Tide's sixth victory in a row in the Third Saturday in October rivalry. Barker assumed the starting job when Woodson was suspended for violating team rules before the LSU game.

Late in the fourth quarter of the Mississippi State game, the Bulldogs drove down to the Alabama 1, but Stacy Harrison's end-zone interception preserved a 13–7 victory. Against LSU, David Palmer ran a punt back 90 yards for a touchdown and Antonio London blocked a field goal with 2:39 to go to preserve a 20–17 Alabama victory. Bama eked out a 10–7 victory over lowly Memphis State after the Memphis kicker missed two second-half field goals and Alabama end John Copeland forced a fumble by the Memphis quarterback at the Tide 27 with 3:51 to go. The season ended with Alabama's fifth straight victory by six points or less, as the Tide defeated Auburn in the Iron Bowl, 13–6. Alabama faced off against Colorado in the Blockbuster Bowl and won another nailbiter 30–25 behind a punt return TD and 146 all-purpose yards from Palmer. Alabama's 11–1 record was its best since the 1979 team went 12–0 and won the national championship.

== Schedule ==
Date	Time	Opponent	Rank	Site	TV	Result	Attendance	Source
September 7	4:00 p.m.	Temple*	No. 20	Legion Field; Birmingham, AL	PPV	W 41–3	83,091	
September 14	6:30 p.m.	at No. 6 Florida	No. 16	Ben Hill Griffin Stadium; Gainesville, FL (rivalry)	ESPN	L 0–35	85,069	
September 21	7:00 p.m.	No. 25 Georgia		Bryant–Denny Stadium; Tuscaloosa, AL (rivalry)	ABC	W 10–0	70,123	
September 28	7:00 p.m.	at Vanderbilt	No. 22	Vanderbilt Stadium; Nashville, TN	PPV	W 48–17	40,736	
October 5	1:30 p.m.	Chattanooga*	No. 20	Legion Field; Birmingham, AL		W 53–7	76,543	
October 12	2:30 p.m.	Tulane*^{†}	No. 19	Bryant–Denny Stadium; Tuscaloosa, AL	PPV	W 62–0	70,123	
October 19	11:00 a.m.	No. 8 Tennessee	No. 14	Legion Field; Birmingham, AL (Third Saturday in October)	ABC	W 24–19	86,293	
November 2	11:30 a.m.	Mississippi State	No. 7	Bryant–Denny Stadium; Tuscaloosa, AL (rivalry)	WTBS	W 13–7	70,123	
November 9	2:30 p.m.	at LSU	No. 8	Tiger Stadium; Baton Rouge, LA (rivalry)	ABC	W 20–17	78,838	
November 16	1:30 p.m.	at Memphis State*	No. 7	Liberty Bowl Memorial Stadium; Memphis, TN		W 10–7	34,632	
November 30	3:00 p.m.	at Auburn	No. 8	Legion Field; Birmingham, AL (Iron Bowl)	ESPN	W 13–6	83,091	
December 28	8:00 p.m.	vs. No. 15 Colorado*	No. 8	Joe Robbie Stadium; Miami Gardens, FL (Blockbuster Bowl)	CBS	W 30–25	52,644	
*Non-conference game; ^{†}Homecoming; Rankings from AP Poll released prior to the game; All times are in Central time

== Rankings ==
Poll	Pre	Wk 1	Wk 2	Wk 3	Wk 4	Wk 5	Wk 6	Wk 7	Wk 8	Wk 9	Wk 10	Wk 11	Wk 12	Wk 13	Wk 14	Final
AP poll	22	20	16	NR	22	20	19	14	7	7	8	7	8	8	8	5

== Roster ==
1991 Alabama Crimson Tide football team roster
Players			Coaches
Offense: Pos. / # / Name / Class; RB / 2 / David Palmer / Fr	Defense: Pos. / # / Name / Class	Special teams: Pos. / # / Name / Class	Head coach: Gene Stallings; Coordinators/assistant coaches: Ellis Johnson (outside linebackers); Legend: (C) Team captain; (S) Suspended; (I) Ineligible; Injured; Redshirt; Roster

== Regular season statistics ==
=== Overall ===
	Alabama	Opponents
Total points	294	118
Average	26.7	10.7
First downs	217	173
Rushing	136	84
Passing	63	78
Penalty	18	11
Total yards	4,280	3,303
Rushing	2,772	1,452
Passing	1,508	1,851
Touchdowns	37	13
Rushing	24	4
Passing	7	9
Return	6	0
Field goals nade–att	12–22	9–19
PAT made–att	34–37	11–11
Third down made–att	60–141	54–160
Third down success rate	42.6	33.8

=== Scoring by quarter ===
	1	2	3	4	Total
Alabama	78	70	59	87	294
Opponents	7	35	25	51	118

=== Passing ===
Name	G	Comp–Att	TD	Int	Yards	Pct.	Long
Woodson	8	64–101	4	3	882	63.4	59
Jay Barker	9	33–56	1	3	554	58.9	75
Siran Stacy	11	3–4	2	1	57	75.0	26
David Palmer	11	1–1	0	0	15	100	15

== NFL draft ==
The following Crimson Tide players were selected in the 1992 NFL draft following the season.

Round	Pick	Player	Position	NFL team
2	48	Siran Stacy	Running back	Philadelphia Eagles
3	71	Kevin Turner	Fullback	New England Patriots
8	218	Robert Stewart	Defensive tackle	New Orleans Saints
10	272	Mark McMillian	Cornerback	Philadelphia Eagles
