= Darren Mickell =

American football player (born 1970)

No. 92, 99, 98
- Positions: Defensive tackle, defensive end

Personal information
- Born: August 3, 1970 (age 56); Miami, Florida, U.S.
- Listed height: 6 ft 4 in (1.93 m)
- Listed weight: 285 lb (129 kg)

Career information
- High school: Miami Senior
- College: Florida
- Supplemental draft: 1992: 2nd round

Career history
- Kansas City Chiefs (1992–1995); New Orleans Saints (1996–1999); San Diego Chargers (2000); Oakland Raiders (2001)

Career NFL statistics
- Tackles: 178
- Sacks: 26
- Forced fumbles: 11
- Stats at Pro Football Reference

Darren Mickell (born August 3, 1970) is an American former professional football player who was a defensive end for 10 seasons in the National Football League (NFL) during the 1990s and early 2000s. Mickell played college football for the Florida Gators, and thereafter, he played in the NFL for the Kansas City Chiefs, the New Orleans Saints, the San Diego Chargers and the Oakland Raiders.

== Early life ==
Mickell was born in Miami, Florida, in 1970. He attended Miami Senior High School, and played high school football for the Miami Stingarees.

== College career ==
Mickell accepted an athletic scholarship to attend the University of Florida in Gainesville, Florida, where he played for coach Steve Spurrier's Gators teams in 1990 and 1991. Mickell was a highly regarded recruit who was signed by the Gators' previous head coach, Galen Hall, but he did not qualify academically and was ineligible to play under the NCAA's Proposition 48 legislation during his freshman season in 1989. Spurrier subsequently benched him for the first five games of the 1991 season for his failure to attend classes as required. After his return to the playing field, Mickell was one of the defensive heroes in the Gators' 14–9 upset of the Florida State Seminoles in November 1991—widely regarded as one of the closest and hardest-fought games in the Florida-Florida State rivalry series. Mickell lettered in 1990 and 1991, and left school a year early, after being suspended for the 1992 season for undisclosed violations of team rules.

== Professional career ==
The Kansas City Chiefs selected Mickell in the second round of the 1992 NFL Supplemental Draft. He played for the Chiefs for four seasons from 1992 to 1995. Mickell was traded to the New Orleans Saints after the 1995 season, and was a consistent starter for the Saints from 1996 to 1998. He signed with the San Diego Chargers a one-year deal as a free agent in 2000, and the Oakland Raiders in 2001. In his eight NFL seasons, Mickell played in eighty-nine regular season games, started sixty-one of them, and recorded 178 tackles and eleven forced fumbles.

== Life after football ==
Mickell is the father of four children: eldest son Darren C. Mickell, Delesha Mickell, Darreon Mickell and Anyae Mickell.

== See also ==
- Florida Gators football, 1990–99
- List of Kansas City Chiefs players
- List of New Orleans Saints players
