= 1991 Ole Miss Rebels football team =

American college football season

1991 Ole Miss Rebels football
- Conference: Southeastern Conference
- Record: 5–6 (1–6 SEC)
- Head coach: Billy Brewer (9th season)
- Offensive coordinator: Red Parker (4th season)
- Defensive coordinator: Robert Henry (4th season)
- Captains: Darron Billings; Jeff Carter; Cliff Dew; Phillip Kent
- Home stadium: Vaught–Hemingway Stadium; Mississippi Veterans Memorial Stadium

1991 Southeastern Conference football standings
	Conf.					Overall
Team	W		L		T	W		L		T
No. 7 Florida $	7	–	0	–	0	10	–	2	–	0
No. 5 Alabama	6	–	1	–	0	11	–	1	–	0
No. 14 Tennessee	5	–	2	–	0	9	–	3	–	0
No. 17 Georgia	4	–	3	–	0	9	–	3	–	0
Mississippi State	4	–	3	–	0	7	–	5	–	0
LSU	3	–	4	–	0	5	–	6	–	0
Vanderbilt	3	–	4	–	0	5	–	6	–	0
Auburn	2	–	5	–	0	5	–	6	–	0
Ole Miss	1	–	6	–	0	5	–	6	–	0
Kentucky	0	–	7	–	0	3	–	8	–	0
$ – Conference champion; Rankings from AP Poll

The 1991 Ole Miss Rebels football team represented the University of Mississippi as a member of the Southeastern Conference during the 1991 NCAA Division I-A football season. Led by ninth-year head coach Billy Brewer, the Rebels compiled an overall record of 5–6, with a mark of 1–6 in conference play, and finished in ninth place in the SEC. The Rebels played their home games at Vaught–Hemingway Stadium in Oxford, Mississippi, and alternate-site home games at Mississippi Veterans Memorial Stadium in Jackson, Mississippi.

== Schedule ==
Date	Opponent	Rank	Site	Result	Attendance	Source
August 31	at Tulane*		Louisiana Superdome; New Orleans, LA (rivalry)	W 22–3	32,879	
September 7	at Memphis State*		Liberty Bowl Memorial Stadium; Memphis, TN (rivalry)	W 10–0	65,483	
September 14	at No. 15 Auburn		Jordan-Hare Stadium; Auburn, AL (rivalry)	L 13–23	81,622	
September 21	Ohio*		Vaught–Hemingway Stadium; Oxford, MS	W 38–14	26,300	
September 28	Arkansas*		Mississippi Veterans Memorial Stadium; Jackson, MS (rivalry)	W 24–17	56,500	
October 5	at Kentucky		Commonwealth Stadium; Lexington, KY	W 35–14	56,375	
October 12	No. 22 Georgia	No. 23	Vaught–Hemingway Stadium; Oxford, MS	L 17–37	38,000	
October 26	Vanderbilt^{†}		Vaught–Hemingway Stadium; Oxford, MS (rivalry)	L 27–30	32,000	
November 2	LSU		Mississippi Veterans Memorial Stadium; Jackson, MS (rivalry)	L 22–25	41,000	
November 16	at No. 10 Tennessee		Neyland Stadium; Knoxville, TN (rivalry)	L 25–36	95,937	
November 23	at Mississippi State		Scott Field; Starkville, MS (Egg Bowl)	L 9–24	41,200	
*Non-conference game; ^{†}Homecoming; Rankings from AP Poll released prior to the game

== Roster ==
1991 Ole Miss Rebels football team roster
Players
Coaches
Offense

Pos.	#	Name	Class
TE	81	Tyji Armstrong	Sr
G	64	Everett Lindsay	Jr
QB		Tom Luke	Jr
WR	1	Darrick Owens	Sr
QB	14	Russ Shows	Jr

Defense

Pos.	#	Name	Class

Special teams

Pos.	#	Name	Class

Head coach

- Billy Brewer

Coordinators/assistant coaches

Legend

- (C) Team captain
- (S) Suspended
- (I) Ineligible
- Injured
- Redshirt
