= Bernard Dafney =

American football player (1968–2006)

No. 71, 75, 72
- Position: Guard

Personal information
- Born: November 1, 1968; Los Angeles, California, U.S.
- Died: January 11, 2006 (aged 37); Conyers, Georgia, U.S.
- Listed height: 6 ft 5 in (1.96 m)
- Listed weight: 324 lb (147 kg)

Career information
- High school: Fremont (South Los Angeles, CA)
- College: Tennessee
- NFL draft: 1992: 9th round, 247th overall pick

Career history
- Houston Oilers (1992)*; Minnesota Vikings (1992–1994); Arizona Cardinals (1995); Pittsburgh Steelers (1996); Baltimore Ravens (1997); Carolina Panthers (1998)*
- * Offseason or practice squad member only

Career NFL statistics
- Games played: 60
- Games started: 29
- Fumble recoveries: 1
- Stats at Pro Football Reference

Bernard Dafney (November 1, 1968 – January 11, 2006) was an American professional football offensive tackle. He was selected by the Houston Oilers in the ninth round of the 1992 NFL draft with the 247th overall pick. Dafney played college football at the university of Tennessee Volunteers. He played for the Oilers, Minnesota Vikings, Arizona Cardinals, Pittsburgh Steelers, and Baltimore Ravens in a six-year career that lasted from 1992 to 1998 in the National Football League (NFL).

Pre-draft measurables
Height	Weight	Arm length	Hand span	Bench press
6 ft 5 1/4 in (1.96 m)	317 lb (144 kg)	34 7/8 in (0.89 m)	9 in (0.23 m)	13 reps

Dafney died of a heart attack in Rockdale County, Georgia, at the age of 37.
