= 1991 Southern Miss Golden Eagles football team =

American college football season

1991 Southern Miss Golden Eagles football
- Conference: Independent
- Record: 4–7
- Head coach: Jeff Bower (1st season)
- Offensive coordinator: Mark McHale (2nd season)
- Offensive scheme: West Coast
- Defensive coordinator: Jim Dickey (1st season)
- Base defense: 4–3
- Home stadium: M. M. Roberts Stadium

1991 NCAA Division I-A independents football records
	Conf.			Overall
Team	W	L	T	W		L		T
No. 9 East Carolina		–		11	–	1	–	0
No. 4 Florida State		–		11	–	2	–	0
No. 3 Penn State		–		11	–	2	–	0
No. 21 Tulsa		–		10	–	2	–	0
Louisiana Tech		–		8	–	1	–	2
No. 13 Notre Dame		–		10	–	3	–	0
Akron		–		5	–	6	–	0
Memphis State		–		5	–	6	–	0
Army		–		4	–	7	–	0
Cincinnati		–		4	–	7	–	0
Southern Miss		–		4	–	7	–	0
South Carolina		–		3	–	6	–	2
Southwestern Louisiana		–		2	–	8	–	1
Louisville		–		2	–	9	–	0
Northern Illinois		–		2	–	9	–	0
Tulane		–		1	–	10	–	0
Navy		–		1	–	10	–	0
Rankings from AP Poll

The 1991 Southern Miss Golden Eagles football team was an American football team that represented the University of Southern Mississippi as an independent during the 1991 NCAA Division I-A football season. In their first year under head coach Jeff Bower, the team compiled a 4–7 record.

== Schedule ==
Date	Opponent	Site	Result	Attendance	Source
August 31	Delta State	M. M. Roberts Stadium; Hattiesburg, MS	W 25–7	17,191	
September 7	at Pittsburgh	Pitt Stadium; Pittsburgh, PA	L 14–35	34,756	
September 21	Colorado State	M. M. Roberts Stadium; Hattiesburg, MS	W 39–7	20,154	
September 28	at Louisville	Cardinal Stadium; Louisville, KY	L 14–28	38,231	
October 5	at No. 16 Auburn	Jordan–Hare Stadium; Auburn, AL	W 10–9	79,790	
October 12	at Memphis State	Liberty Bowl Memorial Stadium; Memphis, TN (rivalry)	L 12–17	19,162	
October 19	Tulane	M. M. Roberts Stadium; Hattiesburg, MS (rivalry)	W 47–14	16,558	
October 26	at Cincinnati	Nippert Stadium; Cincinnati, OH	L 7–17	15,899	
November 2	at Tulsa	Skelly Stadium; Tulsa, OK	L 10–13	27,784	
November 9	No. 16 East Carolina^{†}	M. M. Roberts Stadium; Hattiesburg, MS	L 20–48	18,117	
November 16	at Louisiana Tech	Joe Aillet Stadium; Ruston, LA (rivalry)	L 14–30	11,200	
^{†}Homecoming; Rankings from AP Poll released prior to the game
