= 1991 Georgia Bulldogs football team =

American college football season

1991 Georgia Bulldogs football

Independence Bowl champion

Independence Bowl, W 24–15 vs. Arkansas
- Conference: Southeastern Conference

Ranking
- Coaches: No. 19
- AP: No. 17
- Record: 9–3 (4–3 SEC)
- Head coach: Ray Goff (3rd season)
- Offensive coordinator: Wayne McDuffie (1st season)
- Offensive scheme: No-huddle spread
- Defensive coordinator: Richard Bell (3rd season)
- Base defense: 3–4
- Home stadium: Sanford Stadium

1991 Southeastern Conference football standings
	Conf.					Overall
Team	W		L		T	W		L		T
No. 7 Florida $	7	–	0	–	0	10	–	2	–	0
No. 5 Alabama	6	–	1	–	0	11	–	1	–	0
No. 14 Tennessee	5	–	2	–	0	9	–	3	–	0
No. 17 Georgia	4	–	3	–	0	9	–	3	–	0
Mississippi State	4	–	3	–	0	7	–	5	–	0
LSU	3	–	4	–	0	5	–	6	–	0
Vanderbilt	3	–	4	–	0	5	–	6	–	0
Auburn	2	–	5	–	0	5	–	6	–	0
Ole Miss	1	–	6	–	0	5	–	6	–	0
Kentucky	0	–	7	–	0	3	–	8	–	0
$ – Conference champion; Rankings from AP Poll

The 1991 Georgia Bulldogs football team represented the University of Georgia as a member of the Southeastern Conference (SEC) during the 1991 NCAA Division I-A football season. Led by third-year head coach Ray Goff, the Bulldogs compiled an overall record of 9–3, with a mark of 4–3 in conference play, and finished tied for fourth in the SEC.

== Schedule ==
Date	Time	Opponent	Rank	Site	TV	Result	Attendance	Source
August 31	1:00 p.m.	Western Carolina*		Sanford Stadium; Athens, GA		W 48–0	78,512	
September 7	3:30 p.m.	LSU		Sanford Stadium; Athens, GA	ABC	W 31–10	85,434	
September 21	8:00 p.m.	at Alabama	No. 25	Bryant–Denny Stadium; Tuscaloosa, AL (rivalry)	ABC	L 0–10	70,123	
September 28	1:00 p.m.	Cal State Fullerton*		Sanford Stadium; Athens, GA		W 27–14	76,117	
October 5	7:30 p.m.	No. 6 Clemson*		Sanford Stadium; Athens, GA (rivalry)	ESPN	W 27–12	85,434	
October 12	1:00 p.m.	at No. 23 Ole Miss	No. 22	Vaught–Hemingway Stadium; Oxford, MS	SS	W 37–17	38,000	
October 19	2:00 p.m.	at Vanderbilt	No. 17	Vanderbilt Stadium; Nashville, TN (rivalry)		L 25–27	34,248	
October 26	12:30 p.m.	Kentucky^{†}	No. 24	Sanford Stadium; Athens, GA	TBS	W 49–27	85,312	
November 9	4:00 p.m.	vs. No. 6 Florida	No. 22	Gator Bowl; Jacksonville, FL (rivalry)	ESPN	L 13–45	81,679	
November 16	12:30 p.m.	Auburn		Sanford Stadium; Athens, GA (rivalry)	TBS	W 37–27	85,434	
November 30	12:00 p.m.	at Georgia Tech*	No. 25	Bobby Dodd Stadium; Atlanta, GA (rivalry)	JPS	W 18–15	46,053	
December 29	2:30 p.m.	vs. Arkansas*	No. 24	Independence Stadium; Shreveport, LA (Independence Bowl)	ABC	W 24–15	46,932	
*Non-conference game; ^{†}Homecoming; Rankings from AP Poll released prior to the game; All times are in Eastern time

== Roster ==
1991 Georgia Bulldogs football team roster
Players
Coaches
Offense

Pos.	#	Name	Class
WR	1	Andre Hastings	Jr
RB	5	Garrison Hearst	So
QB	10	Eric Zeier	Fr
WR		Brian Bohannon	So
OL		Bernard Williams	So

Defense

Pos.	#	Name	Class
DB		Will Muschamp	Fr

Special teams

Pos.	#	Name	Class
K		Todd Peterson	Jr

Head coach

- Ray Goff

Coordinators/assistant coaches

- Wayne McDuffie – Offensive coordinator/offensive line/assistant head coach
- Steve Ensminger – Quarterbacks
- Willie McClendon – Running backs
- Bob Harrison – Wide receivers
- Mac McWhorter – Offensive line/tight ends
- Richard Bell – Defensive coordinator/defensive backs
- Steve Greer – Defensive line
- Dicky Clark – Defensive ends/linebackers
- Frank Orgel – Inside linebackers
- Bill Hartman – Special teams
- Mike MacIntyre – Graduate assistant

Legend

- (C) Team captain
- (S) Suspended
- (I) Ineligible
- Injured
- Redshirt

== Rankings ==
Ranking movements Legend: ██ Increase in ranking ██ Decrease in ranking — = Not ranked
	Week															
Poll	Pre	1	2	3	4	5	6	7	8	9	10	11	12	13	14	Final
AP	—	—	—	25	—	—	22	17	24	22	23	—	24	25	24	17
Coaches	—	—	25	22	—	—	22	17	—	22	23	—	—	—	24	19
