= 1991 Mississippi State Bulldogs football team =

American college football season

1991 Mississippi State Bulldogs football

Liberty Bowl, L 15–31 vs. Air Force
- Conference: Southeastern Conference
- Record: 7–5 (4–3 SEC)
- Head coach: Jackie Sherrill (1st season)
- Offensive coordinator: Watson Brown (1st season)
- Defensive coordinator: Bill Clay (1st season)
- Home stadium: Scott Field

1991 Southeastern Conference football standings
	Conf.					Overall
Team	W		L		T	W		L		T
No. 7 Florida $	7	–	0	–	0	10	–	2	–	0
No. 5 Alabama	6	–	1	–	0	11	–	1	–	0
No. 14 Tennessee	5	–	2	–	0	9	–	3	–	0
No. 17 Georgia	4	–	3	–	0	9	–	3	–	0
Mississippi State	4	–	3	–	0	7	–	5	–	0
LSU	3	–	4	–	0	5	–	6	–	0
Vanderbilt	3	–	4	–	0	5	–	6	–	0
Auburn	2	–	5	–	0	5	–	6	–	0
Ole Miss	1	–	6	–	0	5	–	6	–	0
Kentucky	0	–	7	–	0	3	–	8	–	0
$ – Conference champion; Rankings from AP Poll

The 1991 Mississippi State Bulldogs football team represented Mississippi State University as member of the Southeastern Conference (SEC) during the 1991 NCAA Division I-A football season. Led by first-year head coach Jackie Sherrill, the Bulldogs compiled a record of 7–5, with a mark of 4–3 in conference play, and finished tied for fourth in the SEC.

== Schedule ==
Date	Opponent	Rank	Site	TV	Result	Attendance	Source
August 31	Cal State Fullerton*		Scott Field; Starkville, MS		W 47–3	30,307	
September 7	No. 13 Texas*		Scott Field; Starkville, MS		W 13–6	34,123	
September 14	Tulane*	No. 25	Scott Field; Starkville, MS		W 48–0	36,429	
September 21	at No. 6 Tennessee	No. 23	Neyland Stadium; Knoxville, TN		L 24–26	95,974	
September 28	vs. No. 14 Florida	No. 21	Florida Citrus Bowl; Orlando, FL	TBS	L 7–29	69,328	
October 12	Kentucky		Scott Field; Starkville, MS		W 31–6	32,103	
October 19	Memphis State*^{†}		Scott Field; Starkville, MS		L 23–28	38,357	
October 26	at Auburn		Jordan-Hare Stadium; Auburn, AL		W 24–17	82,214	
November 2	at No. 7 Alabama		Bryant–Denny Stadium; Tuscaloosa, AL (rivalry)		L 7–13	70,123	
November 16	at LSU		Tiger Stadium; Baton Rouge, LA (rivalry)		W 28–19	67,724	
November 23	Ole Miss		Scott Field; Starkville, MS (Egg Bowl)		W 24–9	41,200	
December 29	vs. Air Force*		Liberty Bowl Memorial Stadium; Memphis, TN (Liberty Bowl)	ESPN	L 15–38	61,497	
*Non-conference game; ^{†}Homecoming; Rankings from AP Poll released prior to the game

== Season summary ==
=== Texas ===
External videos
- Top 10 Games at Wade–Davis Field – #9

=== Ole Miss ===
External videos
- Sleepy Robinson TD run vs. Ole Miss, 1991

== Personnel ==
1991 Mississippi State Bulldogs football team roster
Players			Coaches
Offense: Pos. / # / Name / Class; QB / 15 / Sleepy Robinson / Jr	Defense: Pos. / # / Name / Class	Special teams: Pos. / # / Name / Class	Head coach: Jackie Sherrill; Coordinators/assistant coaches Legend: (C) Team captain; (S) Suspended; (I) Ineligible; Injured; Redshirt
