= Michael Brandon (American football) =

American football player (born 1968)

No. 99, 90, 95, 78
- Position: Defensive end

Personal information
- Born: July 30, 1968 (age 58); Daytona Beach, Florida, U.S.
- Listed height: 6 ft 4 in (1.93 m)
- Listed weight: 290 lb (132 kg)

Career information
- High school: Taylor County (Perry, Florida)
- College: Florida
- NFL draft: 1992: 12th round, 309th overall pick

Career history
- Indianapolis Colts (1992); Miami Dolphins (1992); New Orleans Saints (1992)*; Indianapolis Colts (1993); Arizona Cardinals (1994); Scottish Claymores (1995); San Francisco 49ers (1995–1996)
- * Offseason or practice squad member only

Career NFL statistics
- Tackles: 26
- Forced fumbles: 1
- Stats at Pro Football Reference

Michael Breon Brandon (born July 30, 1968) is an American former professional football player who was a defensive end for four seasons in the National Football League (NFL) with the Indianapolis Colts, Arizona Cardinals and San Francisco 49ers. He played college football for the Florida Gators and was selected by the Colts in the 12th round of the 1992 NFL draft.

== Early life and college ==
Michael Breon Brandon was born on July 30, 1968, in Daytona Beach, Florida. He attended Taylor County High School in Perry, Florida.

Brandon played college football for the Gators of the University of Florida. He was a three-year letterman from 1989 to 1991.

== Professional career ==
Brandon was selected by the Indianapolis Colts in the 12th round, with the 309th overall pick, of the 1992 NFL draft. He officially signed with the team on July 17. He was released on August 31, signed to the practice squad on September 2, and released again on October 8, 1992.

Brandon signed with the Miami Dolphins on October 12. He was released on December 2, 1992, without appearing in a game.

Brandon was signed to the practice squad of the New Orleans Saints on December 9, 1992. He became a free agent after the season.

Brandon signed with the Colts again on February 8, 1993. He played in 15 games for the Colts during the 1993 season, recording 25 tackles and one forced fumble. He was released on April 26, 1994 and re-signed on July 11 before being waived soon after.

Brandon was claimed off waivers by the Arizona Cardinals on July 17, 1994. He played in one game for the Cardinals that year being released on September 7, 1994.

He played for the Scottish Claymores of the World League of American Football (WLAF) in 1995 and posted five sacks.

Brandon signed with the San Francisco 49ers on July 28, 1995. In October, he signed a two-year contract extension with the 49ers. He appeared in 11 games during the 1995 season and made one solo tackle before being placed on injured reserve on December 25, 1995. He also played in one playoff game that year. Brandon appeared in four games in 1996. He was released by the 49ers on August 14, 1997.
