= 1991 Vanderbilt Commodores football team =

American college football season

1991 Vanderbilt Commodores football
- Conference: Southeastern Conference
- Record: 5–6 (3–4 SEC)
- Head coach: Gerry DiNardo (1st season)
- Offensive coordinator: Don Frease (1st season)
- Defensive coordinator: Carl Reese (1st season)
- Home stadium: Vanderbilt Stadium

1991 Southeastern Conference football standings
	Conf.					Overall
Team	W		L		T	W		L		T
No. 7 Florida $	7	–	0	–	0	10	–	2	–	0
No. 5 Alabama	6	–	1	–	0	11	–	1	–	0
No. 14 Tennessee	5	–	2	–	0	9	–	3	–	0
No. 17 Georgia	4	–	3	–	0	9	–	3	–	0
Mississippi State	4	–	3	–	0	7	–	5	–	0
LSU	3	–	4	–	0	5	–	6	–	0
Vanderbilt	3	–	4	–	0	5	–	6	–	0
Auburn	2	–	5	–	0	5	–	6	–	0
Ole Miss	1	–	6	–	0	5	–	6	–	0
Kentucky	0	–	7	–	0	3	–	8	–	0
$ – Conference champion; Rankings from AP Poll

The 1991 Vanderbilt Commodores football team represented Vanderbilt University in the 1991 NCAA Division I-A football season as a member of the Southeastern Conference (SEC). The Commodores were led by head coach Gerry DiNardo in his first season and finished with a record of five wins and six losses (5–6 overall, 3–4 in the SEC).

== Schedule ==
Date	Time	Opponent	Site	TV	Result	Attendance	Source
September 7	11:00 a.m.	at No. 24 Syracuse*	Carrier Dome; Syracuse, NY	BEN	L 10–37	35,541	
September 14	6:00 p.m.	SMU*	Vanderbilt Stadium; Nashville, TN		W 14–11	31,104	
September 21	7:00 p.m.	at LSU	Tiger Stadium; Baton Rouge, LA		L 14–16	64,341	
September 28	7:00 p.m.	No. 22 Alabama	Vanderbilt Stadium; Nashville, TN	PPV	L 17–48	40,736	
October 5		at Duke*	Wallace Wade Stadium; Durham, NC		L 13–17	20,600	
October 12	7:00 p.m.	No. 24 Auburn	Vanderbilt Stadium; Nashville, TN		L 22–24	32,772	
October 19	1:00 p.m.	No. 17 Georgia	Vanderbilt Stadium; Nashville, TN (rivalry)		W 27–25	34,248	
October 26		at Ole Miss	Vaught–Hemingway Stadium; Oxford, MS (rivalry)		W 30–27	32,000	
November 2		at Army*	Michie Stadium; West Point, NY		W 41–10	35,112	
November 9		Kentucky	Vanderbilt Stadium; Nashville, TN (rivalry)		W 17–7	40,168	
November 30	11:30 a.m.	at No. 9 Tennessee	Neyland Stadium; Knoxville, TN (rivalry)	SPS	L 0–45	94,976	
*Non-conference game; Rankings from AP Poll released prior to the game; All times are in Central time
