= 1992 New York Giants season =

NFL team season

- Head coach: Ray Handley
- Home stadium: Giants Stadium

Results
- Record: 6–10
- Division place: 4th in NFC East
- Playoffs: Did not qualify
- Pro Bowlers: RB Rodney Hampton

The 1992 New York Giants season was the franchise's 68th season in the National Football League. The Giants finished in fourth place in the National Football Conference East Division with a 6–10 record. Head coach Ray Handley was fired after this season, when the Giants lost six of seven games, after starting the season at 5–4.

Injuries marred the Giants' season, especially at quarterback. Phil Simms, once again the team's starting quarterback, suffered a season-ending elbow injury in Week 4. With Simms out the team once again turned to Jeff Hostetler, the Giants' original 1991 starter and winner of Super Bowl XXV, to take his place. Hostetler, who had his own troubles with injuries including a broken back that ended his 1991 season, soon found himself out of the lineup after suffering a concussion in Week 12. The Giants were then forced to turn to a pair of rookies, Kent Graham and Dave Brown, but Graham suffered from elbow and shoulder problems, and Brown suffered a broken right thumb. Hostetler returned for the final two games of the season, a win over the Kansas City Chiefs and a loss to the Philadelphia Eagles.

Perhaps the most catastrophic injury was the torn Achilles' tendon suffered by future Hall of Fame linebacker Lawrence Taylor in Week 10, as the Giants only won once more after the injury. It was the second consecutive year that an injury to Taylor ended his season prematurely (a sprained knee in Week 13 of the 1991 season forced Taylor to miss the final game of the regular season and a previous game against the Cincinnati Bengals).

== Offseason ==
Additions	Subtractions
LB Ed Reynolds (Patriots)	QB Matt Cavanaugh (retirement)
	LB Gary Reasons (Bengals)
	S Adrian White (Packers)
	FB Maurice Carthon (Colts)
	WR Odessa Turner (49ers)
	DT Lorenzo Freeman (Vikings)

=== NFL draft ===
1992 New York Giants draft
Round	Pick	Player	Position	College	Notes
1	11	Derek Brown	TE	Notre Dame	
1	Supplemental	Dave Brown	QB	Duke	
2	41	Phillippi Sparks	CB	Arizona State	
3	69	Aaron Pierce	TE	Washington	
4	99	Keith Hamilton	DT	Pittsburgh	
5	126	Michael Wright	DB	Washington State	
6	153	Stacey Dillard	DT	Oklahoma	
7	180	Corey Widmer	LB	Montana State	
8	211	Kent Graham	QB	Ohio State	
9	238	Anthony Prior	DB	Washington State	
10	265	George Rooks	DE	Syracuse	
11	292	Nate Singleton	WR	Grambling State	
12	323	Charles Swann	WR	Indiana State	
Made roster † Pro Football Hall of Fame * Made at least one Pro Bowl during career

=== Undrafted free agents ===
1992 undrafted free agents of note
Player	Position	College
Brian Allred	Cornerback	Sacramento State
Michael Poloskey	Linebacker	Illinois
Scott Van Bellinger	Linebacker	Northern Illinois

== Roster ==
1992 New York Giants roster
Quarterbacks (QB): 10 Kent Graham; 15 Jeff Hostetler; Running backs (RB): 24 Ottis Anderson; 33 Jarrod Bunch FB; 27 Rodney Hampton; 30 Dave Meggett; 34 Lewis Tillman; Wide receivers (WR): 85 Stephen Baker; 80 Chris Calloway; 82 Mark Ingram Sr.; 81 Ed McCaffrey; 88 Joey Smith KR; Tight ends (TE): 83 John Brandes LS; 86 Derek Brown; 87 Howard Cross; 84 Aaron Pierce	Offensive linemen (OL): 76 Jumbo Elliott T; 68 Clarence Jones T; 61 Bob Kratch G; 60 Eric Moore G; 65 Bart Oates C; 72 Doug Riesenberg T; 66 William Roberts G; 63 Chris Thome C; Defensive linemen (DL): 71 Stacey Dillard NT; 77 Eric Dorsey DE; 93 Mike Fox DE; 75 Keith Hamilton DE; 74 Erik Howard NT; 70 Leonard Marshall DE	Linebackers (LB): 58 Carl Banks OLB; 52 Pepper Johnson ILB; 96 Kanavis McGhee OLB; 57 Corey Miller OLB; 95 Ed Reynolds ILB; 90 Corey Widmer ILB; Defensive backs (DB): 37 Jesse Campbell FS; 29 Myron Guyton FS; 47 Greg Jackson SS; 38 Lamar McGriggs SS; 39 Corey Raymond CB; 22 Phillippi Sparks CB; 21 Reyna Thompson CB; 23 Perry Williams CB; 36 Mike Wright CB; Special teams (ST): 4 Ruben Rodriguez P; 1 Ken Willis K	Practice squad: 41 Brian Allred CB; 67 Jeff Novak G (IR); 97 Ted Popson TE; 89 Charles Swann WR; Reserve: 9 Matt Bahr K (IR); 17 Dave Brown QB (IR); 25 Mark Collins CB (IR); 99 Steve DeOssie LB (IR); -- Millard Hamilton WR (IR); 49 Thom Kaumeyer S (IR); 5 Sean Landeta P (IR); 91 George Rooks NT (IR); 11 Phil Simms QB (IR); 56 Lawrence Taylor LB (IR); 59 Brian Williams C/G (IR); Rookies in italics 47 active, 12 reserve, 3 practice squad

== Preseason ==
Week	Date	Opponent	Result	Record	Venue
1	August 9	Cincinnati Bengals	W 13–7	1–0	Giants Stadium
2	August 15	Cleveland Browns	W 16–7	2–0	Giants Stadium
3	August 22	at New York Jets	L 14–20	2–1	Giants Stadium
4	August 29	at Pittsburgh Steelers	L 3–24	2–2	Three Rivers Stadium

== Regular season ==
=== Schedule ===
Week	Date	Opponent	Result	Record	Venue	Recap
1	September 6	San Francisco 49ers	**L** 14–31	0–1	Giants Stadium	Recap
2	September 13	**Dallas Cowboys**	**L** 28–34	0–2	Giants Stadium	Recap
3	September 21	at Chicago Bears	**W** 27–14	1–2	Soldier Field	Recap
4	Bye					
5	October 4	at Los Angeles Raiders	**L** 10–13	1–3	Los Angeles Memorial Coliseum	Recap
6	October 11	**Phoenix Cardinals**	**W** 31–21	2–3	Giants Stadium	Recap
7	October 18	at Los Angeles Rams	**L** 17–38	2–4	Anaheim Stadium	Recap
8	October 25	Seattle Seahawks	**W** 23–10	3–4	Giants Stadium	Recap
9	November 1	at **Washington Redskins**	**W** 24–7	4–4	RFK Stadium	Recap
10	November 8	Green Bay Packers	**W** 27–7	5–4	Giants Stadium	Recap
11	November 15	at Denver Broncos	**L** 13–27	5–5	Mile High Stadium	Recap
12	November 22	**Philadelphia Eagles**	**L** 34–47	5–6	Giants Stadium	Recap
13	November 26	at **Dallas Cowboys**	**L** 3–30	5–7	Texas Stadium	Recap
14	December 6	**Washington Redskins**	**L** 10–28	5–8	Giants Stadium	Recap
15	December 12	at **Phoenix Cardinals**	**L** 0–19	5–9	Sun Devil Stadium	Recap
16	December 19	Kansas City Chiefs	**W** 35–21	6–9	Giants Stadium	Recap
17	December 27	at **Philadelphia Eagles**	**L** 10–20	6–10	Veterans Stadium	Recap
Note: Intra-division opponents are in **bold** text.

=== Game summaries ===
==== Week 1: vs. San Francisco 49ers ====
Week 1: San Francisco 49ers at New York Giants – Game summary

Quarter	1	2	3	4	Total
**49ers**	7	10	7	7	**31**
Giants	0	7	7	0	**14**

at Giants Stadium, East Rutherford, New Jersey

- Date: September 6
- Game time: 4:00 p.m. EDT
- Game weather: Overcast, 68 °F (20 °C)
- Game attendance: 74,519
- Referee: Bob McElwee
- TV announcers (CBS): Verne Lundquist and John Madden

Game information

**First quarter**

- SF – Tom Rathman 3-yard pass from Steve Young (Mike Cofer kick), 7:03. 49ers 7–0.

**Second quarter**

- NYG – Rodney Hampton 11-yard run (Matt Bahr kick), 8:30. Tied 7–7.
- SF – Mike Cofer 36-yard field goal, 5:09. 49ers 10–7.
- SF – Tom Rathman 15-yard pass from Steve Bono (Mike Cofer kick), 1:54. 49ers 17–7.

**Third quarter**

- NYG – Rodney Hampton 3-yard run (Matt Bahr kick), 5:33. 49ers 17–14.
- SF – Tom Rathman 4-yard pass from Steve Bono (Mike Cofer kick), 1:40. 49ers 24–14.

**Fourth quarter**

- SF – John Johnson 56-yard interception return (Mike Cofer kick), 7:27. 49ers 31–14.

**Top passers**

- SF – Steve Bono – 15/22, 187 yards, 2 TD
- NYG – Phil Simms – 20/37, 223 yards, INT

**Top rushers**

- SF – Ricky Watters – 13 rushes, 100 yards
- NYG – Rodney Hampton – 16 rushes, 77 yards, 2 TD

**Top receivers**

- SF – John Taylor – 2 receptions, 60 yards
- NYG – Mark Ingram – 4 receptions, 62 yards

==== Week 2: vs. Dallas Cowboys ====
Week 2: Dallas Cowboys at New York Giants – Game summary

Quarter	1	2	3	4	Total
**Cowboys**	17	10	7	0	**34**
Giants	0	0	14	14	**28**

at Giants Stadium, East Rutherford, New Jersey

- Date: September 13
- Game time: 1:00 p.m. EDT
- Game weather: Mostly cloudy, 64 °F (18 °C)
- Game attendance: 76,430
- Referee: Tom White
- TV announcers (CBS): Verne Lundquist and John Madden

Game information

**First quarter**

- DAL – Emmitt Smith 5-yard run (Lin Elliott kick), 10:49. Cowboys 7–0.
- DAL – Robert Williams 3-yard blocked punt return (Lin Elliott kick), 8:19. Cowboys 14–0.
- DAL – Lin Elliott 39-yard field goal, 1:23. Cowboys 17–0.

**Second quarter**

- DAL – Lin Elliott 35-yard field goal, 14:03. Cowboys 20–0.
- DAL – Jay Novacek 2-yard pass from Troy Aikman (Lin Elliott kick), 0:32. Cowboys 27–0.

**Third quarter**

- DAL – Michael Irvin 27-yard pass from Troy Aikman (Lin Elliott kick), 13:30. Cowboys 34–0.
- NYG – Rodney Hampton 5-yard run (Matt Bahr kick), 9:07. Cowboys 34–7.
- NYG – Jarrod Bunch 1-yard pass from Phil Simms (Matt Bahr kick), 0:35. Cowboys 34–14.

**Fourth quarter**

- NYG – Stephen Baker 6-yard pass from Phil Simms (Matt Bahr kick), 10:25. Cowboys 34–21.
- NYG – Howard Cross 2-yard pass from Phil Simms (Matt Bahr kick), 6:52. Cowboys 34–28.

**Top passers**

- DAL – Troy Aikman – 22/35, 238 yards, 2 TD
- NYG – Phil Simms – 25/42, 273 yards, 3 TD, INT

**Top rushers**

- DAL – Emmitt Smith – 23 rushes, 89 yards, TD
- NYG – Rodney Hampton – 17 rushes, 64 yards, TD

**Top receivers**

- DAL – Michael Irvin – 4 receptions, 73 yards, TD
- NYG – Ed McCaffrey – 5 receptions, 82 yards

==== Week 3: at Chicago Bears ====
Week 3: New York Giants at Chicago Bears – Game summary

Quarter	1	2	3	4	Total
**Giants**	7	7	10	3	**27**
Bears	7	7	0	0	**14**

at Soldier Field, Chicago, Illinois

- Date: September 21
- Game time: 9:00 p.m. EDT/8:00 p.m. CDT
- Game weather: Mostly cloudy, 63 °F (17 °C)
- Game attendance: 63,444
- Referee: Howard Roe
- TV announcers (ABC): Al Michaels, Frank Gifford and Dan Dierdorf

Game information

**First quarter**

- CHI – Neal Anderson 8-yard pass from Jim Harbaugh (Kevin Butler kick), 5:32. Bears 7–0.
- NYG – Howard Cross 15-yard pass from Phil Simms (Matt Bahr kick), 1:36. Tied 7–7.

**Second quarter**

- CHI – Brad Muster 44-yard pass from Jim Harbaugh (Kevin Butler kick), 12:20. Bears 14–7.
- NYG – Rodney Hampton 1-yard run (Matt Bahr kick), 2:18. Tied 14–14.

**Third quarter**

- NYG – Stephen Baker 13-yard pass from Phil Simms (Matt Bahr kick), 9:35. Giants 21–14.
- NYG – Matt Bahr 31-yard field goal, 1:46. Giants 24–14.

**Fourth quarter**

- NYG – Matt Bahr 32-yard field goal, 10:19. Giants 27–14.

**Top passers**

- NYG – Phil Simms – 19/29, 220 yards, 2 TD
- CHI – Jim Harbaugh – 17/28, 183 yards, 2 TD, INT

**Top rushers**

- NYG – Rodney Hampton – 22 rushes, 94 yards, TD
- CHI – Neal Anderson – 11 rushes, 56 yards

**Top receivers**

- NYG – Stephen Baker – 7 receptions, 109 yards, TD
- CHI – Brad Muster – 3 receptions, 61 yards, TD

==== Week 5: at Los Angeles Raiders ====
Week 5: New York Giants at Los Angeles Raiders – Game summary

Quarter	1	2	3	4	Total
Giants	0	10	0	0	**10**
**Raiders**	0	0	10	3	**13**

at Los Angeles Memorial Coliseum, Los Angeles, California

- Date: October 4
- Game time: 4:00 p.m. EDT/1:00 p.m. PDT
- Game weather: Partly cloudy, 66 °F (19 °C)
- Game attendance: 43,103
- Referee: Gary Lane
- TV announcers (CBS): Verne Lundquist and Dan Fouts

Game information

**First quarter**

- No scoring plays.

**Second quarter**

- NYG – Jarrod Bunch 5-yard run (Matt Bahr kick), 13:58. Giants 7–0.
- NYG – Matt Bahr 18-yard field goal, 0:02. Giants 10–0.

**Third quarter**

- LAR – Jeff Jaeger 26-yard field goal, 8:25. Giants 10–3.
- LAR – Tim Brown 68-yard pass from Todd Marinovich (Jeff Jaeger kick), 4:22. Tied 10–10.

**Fourth quarter**

- LAR – Jeff Jaeger 54-yard field goal, 7:15. Raiders 13–10.

**Top passers**

- NYG – Phil Simms – 19/29, 196 yards, INT
- LAR – Todd Marinovich – 14/23, 216 yards, TD

**Top rushers**

- NYG – Rodney Hampton – 17 rushes, 49 yards
- LAR – Eric Dickerson – 12 rushes, 52 yards

**Top receivers**

- NYG – Mark Ingram – 4 receptions, 65 yards
- LAR – Tim Brown – 2 receptions, 80 yards, TD

==== Week 6: vs. Phoenix Cardinals ====
Week 6: Phoenix Cardinals at New York Giants – Game summary

Quarter	1	2	3	4	Total
Cardinals	7	7	0	7	**21**
**Giants**	7	14	10	0	**31**

at Giants Stadium, East Rutherford, New Jersey

- Date: October 11
- Game time: 1:00 p.m. EDT
- Game weather: Light rain, 63 °F (17 °C)
- Game attendance: 70,042
- Referee: Jerry Markbreit
- TV announcers (CBS): Tim Ryan and Matt Millen

Game information

**First quarter**

- PHO – Ernie Jones 72-yard pass from Chris Chandler (Greg Davis kick), 12:20. Cardinals 7–0.
- NYG – Rodney Hampton 63-yard run (Matt Bahr kick), 6:43. Tied 7–7.

**Second quarter**

- NYG – Jarrod Bunch 6-yard run (Matt Bahr kick), 11:38. Giants 14–7.
- NYG – Ed McCaffrey 25-yard pass from Jeff Hostetler (Matt Bahr kick), 8:36. Giants 21–7.
- PHO – Chris Chandler 1-yard run (Greg Davis kick), 1:55. Giants 21–14.

**Third quarter**

- NYG – Jeff Hostetler 16-yard run (Matt Bahr kick), 6:31. Giants 28–14.
- NYG – Matt Bahr 32-yard field goal, 0:30. Giants 31–14.

**Fourth quarter**

- PHO – Johnny Bailey 7-yard pass from Chris Chandler (Greg Davis kick), 7:30. Giants 31–21.

**Top passers**

- PHO – Chris Chandler – 16/30, 209 yards, 2 TD, INT
- NYG – Jeff Hostetler – 9/17, 142 yards, TD

**Top rushers**

- PHO – Ivory Lee Brown – 15 rushes, 47 yards
- NYG – Rodney Hampton – 21 rushes, 167 yards, TD

**Top receivers**

- PHO – Ernie Jones – 6 receptions, 125 yards, TD
- NYG – Mark Ingram – 2 receptions, 40 yards

==== Week 7: at Los Angeles Rams ====
Week 7: New York Giants at Los Angeles Rams – Game summary

Quarter	1	2	3	4	Total
Giants	0	10	0	7	**17**
**Rams**	7	7	10	14	**38**

at Anaheim Stadium, Anaheim, California

- Date: October 18
- Game time: 4:00 p.m. EDT/1:00 p.m. PDT
- Game weather: Light rain, 66 °F (19 °C)
- Game attendance: 53,541
- Referee: Bernie Kukar
- TV announcers (CBS): Verne Lundquist and Dan Fouts

Game information

**First quarter**

- LA – Cleveland Gary 1-yard run (Tony Zendejas kick), 10:40. Rams 7–0.

**Second quarter**

- NYG – Rodney Hampton 10-yard run (Matt Bahr kick), 13:22. Tied 7–7.
- LA – Pat Carter 9-yard pass from Jim Everett (Tony Zendejas kick), 7:31. Rams 14–7.
- NYG – Matt Bahr 31-yard field goal, 0:45. Rams 14–10.

**Third quarter**

- LA – Tony Zendejas 46-yard field goal, 9:53. Rams 17–10.
- LA – Jeff Chadwick 19-yard pass from Jim Everett (Tony Zendejas kick), 0:10. Rams 24–10.

**Fourth quarter**

- LA – Cleveland Gary 5-yard run (Tony Zendejas kick), 10:29. Rams 31–10.
- NYG – Rodney Hampton 2-yard run (Matt Bahr kick), 3:33. Rams 31–17.
- LA – David Lang 1-yard run (Tony Zendejas kick), 1:53. Rams 38–17.

**Top passers**

- NYG – Jeff Hostetler – 18/32, 149 yards, INT
- LA – Jim Everett – 18/21, 242 yards, 2 TD

**Top rushers**

- NYG – Jeff Hostetler – 5 rushes, 42 yards
- LA – Cleveland Gary – 31 rushes, 126 yards, 2 TD

**Top receivers**

- NYG – Dave Meggett – 7 receptions, 70 yards
- LA – Aaron Cox – 5 receptions, 73 yards

==== Week 8: vs. Seattle Seahawks ====
Week 8: Seattle Seahawks at New York Giants – Game summary

Quarter	1	2	3	4	Total
Seahawks	0	3	7	0	**10**
**Giants**	0	6	14	3	**23**

at Giants Stadium, East Rutherford, New Jersey

- Date: October 25
- Game time: 1:00 p.m. EST
- Game weather: Overcast, 51 °F (11 °C)
- Game attendance: 67,339
- Referee: Ed Hochuli
- TV announcers (NBC): Marv Albert and Bill Parcells

Game information

**First quarter**

- No scoring plays.

**Second quarter**

- NYG – Matt Bahr 36-yard field goal, 12:49. Giants 3–0.
- SEA – John Kasay 33-yard field goal, 7:28. Tied 3–3.
- NYG – Matt Bahr 25-yard field goal, 0:00. Giants 6–3.

**Third quarter**

- SEA – Tommy Kane 13-yard pass from Stan Gelbaugh (John Kasay kick), 11:37. Seahawks 10–6.
- NYG – Jeff Hostetler 7-yard run (Matt Bahr kick), 8:05. Giants 13–10.
- NYG – Ed McCaffrey 7-yard pass from Jeff Hostetler (Matt Bahr kick), 0:56. Giants 20–10.

**Fourth quarter**

- NYG – Matt Bahr 30-yard field goal, 7:01. Giants 23–10.

**Top passers**

- SEA – Stan Gelbaugh – 22/32, 130 yards, TD, INT
- NYG – Jeff Hostetler – 5/9, 94 yards, TD

**Top rushers**

- SEA – John Williams – 11 rushes, 44 yards
- NYG – Jarrod Bunch – 12 rushes, 77 yards

**Top receivers**

- SEA – John Williams – 11 receptions, 45 yards
- NYG – Stephen Baker – 1 reception, 46 yards

==== Week 9: at Washington Redskins ====
Week 9: New York Giants at Washington Redskins – Game summary

Quarter	1	2	3	4	Total
**Giants**	7	14	0	3	**24**
Redskins	7	0	0	0	**7**

at RFK Stadium, Washington D.C.

- Date: November 1
- Game time: 8:00 p.m. EST
- Game weather: Light rain, 46 °F (8 °C)
- Game attendance: 53,647
- Referee: Howard Roe
- TV announcers (TNT): Gary Bender and Pat Haden

Game information

**First quarter**

- WAS – Brian Mitchell 84-yard punt return (Chip Lohmiller kick), 4:35. Redskins 7–0.
- NYG – Jarrod Bunch 8-yard run (Matt Bahr kick), 1:22. Tied 7–7.

**Second quarter**

- NYG – Ed McCaffrey 17-yard pass from Jeff Hostetler (Matt Bahr kick), 2:36. Giants 14–7.
- NYG – Dave Meggett 4-yard pass from Jeff Hostetler (Matt Bahr kick), 0:08. Giants 21–7.

**Third quarter**

- No scoring plays.

**Fourth quarter**

- NYG – Matt Bahr 19-yard field goal, 8:07. Giants 24–7.

**Top passers**

- NYG – Jeff Hostetler – 15/29, 161 yards, 2 TD
- WAS – Mark Rypien – 14/31, 187 yards

**Top rushers**

- NYG – Rodney Hampton – 23 rushes, 138 yards
- WAS – Earnest Byner – 9 rushes, 32 yards

**Top receivers**

- NYG – Howard Cross – 3 receptions, 58 yards
- WAS – Ricky Sanders – 4 receptions, 72 yards

==== Week 10: vs. Green Bay Packers ====
Week 10: Green Bay Packers at New York Giants – Game summary

Quarter	1	2	3	4	Total
Packers	0	7	0	0	**7**
**Giants**	6	7	0	14	**27**

at Giants Stadium, East Rutherford, New Jersey

- Date: November 8
- Game time: 1:00 p.m. EST
- Game weather: Mostly sunny, 37 °F (3 °C)
- Game attendance: 72,038
- Referee: Larry Nemmers
- TV announcers (CBS): Dick Stockton and Randy Cross

Game information

**First quarter**

- NYG – Matt Bahr 47-yard field goal, 7:26. Giants 3–0.
- NYG – Matt Bahr 38-yard field goal, 2:11. Giants 6–0.

**Second quarter**

- GB – Vince Workman 3-yard run (Chris Jacke kick), 9:03. Packers 7–6.
- NYG – Rodney Hampton 2-yard run (Matt Bahr kick), 3:31. Giants 13–7.

**Third quarter**

- No scoring plays.

**Fourth quarter**

- NYG – Reyna Thompson 69-yard interception return (Matt Bahr kick), 3:38. Giants 20–7.
- NYG – Rodney Hampton 8-yard run (Matt Bahr kick), 0:49. Giants 27–7.

**Top passers**

- GB – Brett Favre – 27/44, 279 yards, 3 INT
- NYG – Jeff Hostetler – 9/16, 133 yards

**Top rushers**

- GB – Vince Workman – 19 rushes, 65 yards, TD
- NYG – Rodney Hampton – 15 rushes, 44 yards, 2 TD

**Top receivers**

- GB – Sterling Sharpe – 11 receptions, 160 yards
- NYG – Stephen Baker – 2 receptions, 46 yards

==== Week 11: at Denver Broncos ====
Week 11: New York Giants at Denver Broncos – Game summary

Quarter	1	2	3	4	Total
Giants	0	6	0	7	**13**
**Broncos**	14	0	3	10	**27**

at Mile High Stadium, Denver, Colorado

- Date: November 15
- Game time: 8:00 p.m. EST/6:00 p.m. MST
- Game weather: Scattered clouds, 46 °F (8 °C)
- Game attendance: 75,269
- Referee: Bob McElwee
- TV announcers (ESPN): Mike Patrick and Joe Theismann

Game information

**First quarter**

- DEN – Reggie Rivers 2-yard run (David Treadwell kick), 8:32. Broncos 7–0.
- DEN – Mark Jackson 51-yard pass from John Elway (David Treadwell kick), 5:03. Broncos 14–0.

**Second quarter**

- NYG – Matt Bahr 30-yard field goal, 14:01. Broncos 14–3.
- NYG – Matt Bahr 38-yard field goal, 0:18. Broncos 14–6.

**Third quarter**

- DEN – David Treadwell 25-yard field goal, 8:53. Broncos 17–6.

**Fourth quarter**

- DEN – David Treadwell 46-yard field goal, 14:08. Broncos 20–6.
- NYG – Jeff Hostetler 5-yard run (Matt Bahr kick), 8:54. Broncos 20–13.
- DEN – Greg Lewis 2-yard run (David Treadwell kick), 5:44. Broncos 27–13.

**Top passers**

- NYG – Jeff Hostetler – 6/12, 59 yards
- DEN – Tommy Maddox – 9/13, 134 yards

**Top rushers**

- NYG – Rodney Hampton – 20 rushes, 87 yards
- DEN – Gaston Green – 18 rushes, 92 yards

**Top receivers**

- NYG – Ed McCaffrey – 3 receptions, 27 yards
- DEN – Mark Jackson – 3 receptions, 108 yards, TD

==== Week 12: vs. Philadelphia Eagles ====
Week 12: Philadelphia Eagles at New York Giants – Game summary

Quarter	1	2	3	4	Total
**Eagles**	0	20	20	7	**47**
Giants	10	10	7	7	**34**

at Giants Stadium, East Rutherford, New Jersey

- Date: November 22
- Game time: 1:00 p.m. EST
- Game weather: Light rain, 60 °F (16 °C)
- Game attendance: 68,153
- Referee: Dick Hantak
- TV announcers (CBS): Dick Stockton and Randy Cross

Game information

**First quarter**

- NYG – Matt Bahr 35-yard field goal, 8:49. Giants 3–0.
- NYG – Dave Meggett 14-yard pass from Jeff Hostetler (Matt Bahr kick), 2:24. Giants 10–0.

**Second quarter**

- PHI – Herschel Walker 21-yard pass from Randall Cunningham (kick failed), 14:54. Giants 10–6.
- NYG – Dave Meggett 92-yard kickoff return (Matt Bahr kick), 14:32. Giants 17–6.
- NYG – Matt Bahr 44-yard field goal, 12:15. Giants 20–6.
- PHI – Seth Joyner 43-yard interception return (Roger Ruzek kick), 9:35. Giants 20–13.
- PHI – Herschel Walker 11-yard run (Roger Ruzek kick), 4:02. Tied 20–20.

**Third quarter**

- PHI – Keith Byars 38-yard pass from Randall Cunningham (Roger Ruzek kick), 13:09. Eagles 27–20.
- PHI – Ken Rose 3-yard blocked punt return (Roger Ruzek kick), 10:23. Eagles 34–20.
- PHI – Vai Sikahema 87-yard punt return (kick failed), 7:59. Eagles 40–20.
- NYG – Ed McCaffrey 17-yard pass from Kent Graham (Matt Bahr kick), 2:39. Eagles 40–27.

**Fourth quarter**

- PHI – Heath Sherman 30-yard run (Roger Ruzek kick), 8:48. Eagles 47–27.
- NYG – Rodney Hampton 2-yard run (Matt Bahr kick), 5:07. Eagles 47–34.

**Top passers**

- PHI – Randall Cunningham – 10/21, 209 yards, 2 TD, 3 INT
- NYG – Jeff Hostetler – 11/28, 154 yards, TD, INT

**Top rushers**

- PHI – Heath Sherman – 17 rushes, 109 yards, TD
- NYG – Rodney Hampton – 10 rushes, 47 yards, TD

**Top receivers**

- PHI – Herschel Walker – 4 receptions, 79 yards, TD
- NYG – Stephen Baker – 4 receptions, 89 yards

==== Week 13: at Dallas Cowboys ====
Week 13: New York Giants at Dallas Cowboys – Game summary

Quarter	1	2	3	4	Total
Giants	0	3	0	0	**3**
**Cowboys**	3	6	14	7	**30**

at Texas Stadium, Irving, Texas

- Date: November 26
- Game time: 4:00 p.m. EST/3:00 p.m. CST
- Game weather: Overcast, 38 °F (3 °C)
- Game attendance: 62,416
- Referee: Johnny Grier
- TV announcers (CBS): Pat Summerall and John Madden

Game information

**First quarter**

- DAL – Lin Elliott 45-yard field goal, 3:22. Cowboys 3–0.

**Second quarter**

- DAL – Lin Elliott 33-yard field goal, 12:39. Cowboys 6–0.
- DAL – Lin Elliott 53-yard field goal, 2:22. Cowboys 9–0.
- NYG – Matt Bahr 42-yard field goal, 0:03. Cowboys 9–3.

**Third quarter**

- DAL – Emmitt Smith 26-yard pass from Troy Aikman (Lin Elliott kick), 6:03. Cowboys 16–3.
- DAL – Emmitt Smith 68-yard run (Lin Elliott kick), 3:53. Cowboys 23–3.

**Fourth quarter**

- DAL – Alvin Harper 4-yard pass from Troy Aikman (Lin Elliott kick), 6:04. Cowboys 30–3.

**Top passers**

- NYG – Kent Graham – 12/28, 151 yards
- DAL – Troy Aikman – 19/29, 143 yards, 2 TD, INT

**Top rushers**

- NYG – Rodney Hampton – 10 rushes, 33 yards
- DAL – Emmitt Smith – 17 rushes, 120 yards, TD

**Top receivers**

- NYG – Ed McCaffrey – 6 receptions, 105 yards
- DAL – Emmitt Smith – 6 receptions, 41 yards, TD

==== Week 14: vs. Washington Redskins ====
Week 14: Washington Redskins at New York Giants – Game summary

Quarter	1	2	3	4	Total
**Redskins**	7	7	7	7	**28**
Giants	0	3	7	0	**10**

at Giants Stadium, East Rutherford, New Jersey

- Date: December 6
- Game time: 4:00 p.m. EST
- Game weather: Overcast, 31 °F (−1 °C)
- Game attendance: 62,998
- Referee: Gary Lane
- TV announcers (CBS): Dick Stockton and Randy Cross

Game information

**First quarter**

- WAS – Earnest Byner 1-yard run (Chip Lohmiller kick), 4:23. Redskins 7–0.

**Second quarter**

- WAS – Earnest Byner 11-yard run (Chip Lohmiller kick), 7:02. Redskins 14–0.
- NYG – Ken Willis 43-yard field goal, 1:05. Redskins 14–3.

**Third quarter**

- NYG – Rodney Hampton 1-yard run (Ken Willis kick), 6:23. Redskins 14–10.
- WAS – Terry Orr 20-yard pass from Mark Rypien (Chip Lohmiller kick), 0:46. Redskins 21–10.

**Fourth quarter**

- WAS – Art Monk 42-yard pass from Mark Rypien (Chip Lohmiller kick), 10:56. Redskins 28–10.

**Top passers**

- WAS – Mark Rypien – 15/18, 216 yards, 2 TD
- NYG – Kent Graham – 8/16, 73 yards

**Top rushers**

- WAS – Earnest Byner – 20 rushes, 100 yards, 2 TD
- NYG – Rodney Hampton – 13 rushes, 64 yards, TD

**Top receivers**

- WAS – Ricky Sanders – 5 receptions, 69 yards
- NYG – Ed McCaffrey – 3 receptions, 33 yards

==== Week 15: at Phoenix Cardinals ====
Week 15: New York Giants at Phoenix Cardinals – Game summary

Quarter	1	2	3	4	Total
Giants	0	0	0	0	**0**
**Cardinals**	0	9	3	7	**19**

at Sun Devil Stadium, Tempe, Arizona

- Date: December 12
- Game time: 4:00 p.m. EST/2:00 p.m. CST
- Game weather: Cloudy, 56 °F (13 °C)
- Game attendance: 28,452
- Referee: Bernie Kukar
- TV announcers (CBS): Verne Lundquist and Dan Fouts

Game information

**First quarter**

- No scoring plays.

**Second quarter**

- PHO – Dave Brown tackled in end zone by Eric Swann for a safety, 10:35. Cardinals 2–0.
- PHO – Johnny Johnson 5-yard run (Greg Davis kick), 5:56. Cardinals 9–0.

**Third quarter**

- PHO – Greg Davis 26-yard field goal, 7:11. Cardinals 12–0.

**Fourth quarter**

- PHO – Johnny Johnson 42-yard run (Greg Davis kick), 14:52. Cardinals 19–0.

**Top passers**

- NYG – Kent Graham – 7/21, 54 yards, 2 INT
- PHO – Chris Chandler – 12/18, 130 yards

**Top rushers**

- NYG – Rodney Hampton – 12 rushes, 51 yards
- PHO – Johnny Johnson – 36 rushes, 156 yards, 2 TD

**Top receivers**

- NYG – Chris Calloway – 3 receptions, 33 yards
- PHO – Randal Hill – 4 receptions, 63 yards

==== Week 16: vs. Kansas City Chiefs ====
Week 16: Kansas City Chiefs at New York Giants – Game summary

Quarter	1	2	3	4	Total
Chiefs	0	7	7	7	**21**
**Giants**	14	7	14	0	**35**

at Giants Stadium, East Rutherford, New Jersey

- Date: December 19
- Game time: 12:30 p.m. EST
- Game weather: Overcast, 40 °F (4 °C)
- Game attendance: 53,428
- Referee: Pat Haggerty
- TV announcers (NBC): Dick Enberg and Bob Trumpy

Game information

**First quarter**

- NYG – Mark Ingram 21-yard pass from Jeff Hostetler (Ken Willis kick), 2:01. Giants 7–0.
- NYG – Rodney Hampton 2-yard run (Ken Willis kick), 0:16. Giants 14–0.

**Second quarter**

- KC – Christian Okoye 1-yard run (Nick Lowery kick), 7:24. Giants 14–7.
- NYG – Chris Calloway 15-yard pass from Jeff Hostetler (Ken Willis kick), 0:18. Giants 21–7.

**Third quarter**

- NYG – Rodney Hampton 1-yard run (Ken Willis kick), 8:53. Giants 28–7.
- NYG – Rodney Hampton 20-yard run (Ken Willis kick), 5:11. Giants 35–7.
- KC – Tim Barnett 77-yard pass from Dave Krieg (Nick Lowery kick), 4:46. Giants 35–14.

**Fourth quarter**

- KC – Ruben Rodriguez punt blocked by Kimble Anders, ball recovered in NYG end zone by Tracy Rogers for touchdown (Nick Lowery kick), 3:40. Giants 35–21.

**Top passers**

- KC – Dave Krieg – 18/34, 259 yards, TD, 2 INT
- NYG – Jeff Hostetler – 10/16, 131 yards, 2 TD

**Top rushers**

- KC – Christian Okoye – 11 rushes, 36 yards, TD
- NYG – Rodney Hampton – 18 rushes, 84 yards, 3 TD

**Top receivers**

- KC – Tim Barnett – 1 reception, 77 yards, TD
- NYG – Chris Calloway – 4 receptions, 54 yards, TD

==== Week 17: at Philadelphia Eagles ====
Week 17: New York Giants at Philadelphia Eagles – Game summary

Quarter	1	2	3	4	Total
Giants	0	0	3	7	**10**
**Eagles**	7	10	0	3	**20**

at Veterans Stadium, Philadelphia, Pennsylvania

- Date: December 27
- Game time: 1:00 p.m. EST
- Game weather: Sunny, 27 °F (−3 °C)
- Game attendance: 64,266
- Referee: Red Cashion
- TV announcers (CBS): Tim Ryan, Matt Millen and Lesley Visser

Game information

**First quarter**

- PHI – Calvin Williams 34-yard pass from Randall Cunningham (Roger Ruzek kick), 0:46. Eagles 7–0.

**Second quarter**

- PHI – Randall Cunningham 20-yard run (Roger Ruzek kick), 5:12. Eagles 14–0.
- PHI – Roger Ruzek 45-yard field goal, 0:01. Eagles 17–0.

**Third quarter**

- NYG – Ken Willis 20-yard field goal, 9:01. Eagles 17–3.

**Fourth quarter**

- NYG – Ed McCaffrey 13-yard pass from Jeff Hostetler (Ken Willis kick), 10:05. Eagles 17–10.
- PHI – Roger Ruzek 46-yard field goal, 7:29. Eagles 20–10.

**Top passers**

- NYG – Jeff Hostetler – 20/33, 202 yards, TD, INT
- PHI – Randall Cunningham – 11/21, 125 yards, TD

**Top rushers**

- NYG – Rodney Hampton – 12 rushes, 35 yards
- PHI – Herschel Walker – 16 rushes, 104 yards

**Top receivers**

- NYG – Mark Ingram – 5 receptions, 63 yards
- PHI – Calvin Williams – 2 receptions, 43 yards, TD

=== Standings ===
NFC East
	W	L	T	PCT	DIV	CONF	PF	PA	STK
^{(2)} Dallas Cowboys	13	3	0	.813	6–2	9–3	409	243	W2
^{(5)} Philadelphia Eagles	11	5	0	.688	6–2	8–4	354	245	W4
^{(6)} Washington Redskins	9	7	0	.563	4–4	7–5	300	255	L2
New York Giants	6	10	0	.375	2–6	4–8	306	367	L1
Phoenix Cardinals	4	12	0	.250	2–6	4–10	243	332	L2

== See also ==
- List of New York Giants seasons
