= 1991 Syracuse Orangemen football team =

American college football season

1991 Syracuse Orangemen football

Hall of Fame Bowl champion

Hall of Fame Bowl, W 24–17 vs. Ohio State
- Conference: Big East Conference

Ranking
- Coaches: No. 11
- AP: No. 11
- Record: 10–2 (5–0 Big East)
- Head coach: Paul Pasqualoni (1st season)
- Offensive coordinator: George DeLeone (5th season)
- Defensive coordinator: Kevin Coyle (1st season)
- Captains: Andrew Dees; Mark McDonald; Tim Sandquist; Greg Walker
- Home stadium: Carrier Dome

1991 Big East Conference football standings
	Conf.					Overall
Team	W		L		T	W		L		T
No. 11 Syracuse	5	–	0	–	0	10	–	2	–	0
No. 1 Miami (FL)	2	–	0	–	0	12	–	0	–	0
Virginia Tech	1	–	0	–	0	5	–	6	–	0
Pittsburgh	3	–	2	–	0	6	–	5	–	0
West Virginia	3	–	4	–	0	6	–	5	–	0
Rutgers	2	–	3	–	0	6	–	5	–	0
Boston College	2	–	4	–	0	4	–	7	–	0
Temple	0	–	5	–	0	2	–	9	–	0
The Big East did not crown an official champion until 1993 when full league play began.; Rankings from AP Poll

The 1991 Syracuse Orangemen football team represented Syracuse University as a member of the Big East Conference during the 1991 NCAA Division I-A football season. Led by first-year head coach Paul Pasqualoni, the Orangemen compiled an overall record of 10–2 with a mark of 5–0 in conference play. Syracuse was invited to the Hall of Fame Bowl, where the Orangemen defeated Ohio State. The team played home games at the Carrier Dome in Syracuse, New York.

Two new eras began for Syracuse football in 1991. It was the first season as head coach for Paul Pasqualoni, who was promoted from assistant after Dick MacPherson, who had led the Orangemen for the previous 11 seasons, left to take the head coaching job for the New England Patriots of the National Football League (NFL). 1991 was also the first season in which the Big East Conference sponsored football, although the conference would not establish a full round-robin schedule in the sport until the 1993 season.

== Schedule ==
Date	Time	Opponent	Rank	Site	TV	Result	Attendance	Source
September 7	12:00 pm	Vanderbilt*	No. 24	Carrier Dome; Syracuse, NY	BEN	W 37–10	35,541	
September 14	7:00 pm	at Maryland*	No. 22	Byrd Stadium; College Park, MD		W 31–17	41,310	
September 21	3:30 pm	No. 5 Florida*^{†}	No. 18	Carrier Dome; Syracuse, NY	ABC	W 38–21	49,823	
September 28	8:00 pm	at Tulane*	No. T–10	Louisiana Superdome; New Orleans, LA		W 24–0	19,729	
October 5	3:30 pm	at No. 1 Florida State*	No. 10	Doak Campbell Stadium; Tallahassee, FL	ABC	L 14–46	61,231	
October 12	1:30 pm	East Carolina*	No. 15	Carrier Dome; Syracuse, NY		L 20–23	37,767	
October 19	1:30 pm	at No. 20 Pittsburgh	No. 24	Pitt Stadium; Pittsburgh, PA (rivalry)		W 31–27	42,707	
October 26	12:00 pm	at Rutgers	No. 18	Rutgers Stadium; Piscataway, NJ	BEN	W 21–7	30,162	
November 2	1:30 pm	Temple	No. 18	Carrier Dome; Syracuse, NY		W 27–6	46,819	
November 16	12:00 pm	Boston College	No. 17	Carrier Dome; Syracuse, NY	BEN	W 38–16	45,453	
November 23	4:00 pm	West Virginia	No. 16	Carrier Dome; Syracuse, NY (rivalry)	ESPN	W 16–10	45,263	
January 1	1:00 pm	vs. No. 25 Ohio State*	No. 16	Tampa Stadium; Tampa, FL (Hall of Fame Bowl)	NBC	W 24–17	57,789	
*Non-conference game; ^{†}Homecoming; Rankings from AP Poll released prior to the game; All times are in Eastern time; Source:

== Roster ==
1991 Syracuse Orange football team roster
Players
Coaches
Offense

Pos.	#	Name	Class
OT	79	Kyle Adams	So
TE	87	Kevin Barker	Sr
OL	72	John Capachione	Sr
RB	42	Kirby Dar Dar	Fr
OT	74	Andrew Dees	Sr
WR	82	Kerry Ferrell	Sr
TE	84	Chris Gedney	Jr
QB	5	Marvin Graves	Jr
WR	8	Marvin Harrison	Fr
WR	12	Shelby Hill	So
WR	45	Qadry Ismail	Jr
WR	80	Antonio Johnson	Jr
WR	16	Todd Kasmer	Sr
FB	32	Marcus Lee	So
QB	6	Mark McDonald	Sr
OL	66	John Nilsen	Sr
RB	36	Brian Picucci	So
C	75	John Reagan	So
RB	44	Terry Richardson	So
OL	69	Jerry Sharp	Jr
RB	33	David Walker	Jr
OL	68	Terrence Wisdom	Jr
QB	10	Doug Womack	So
FB	38	Al Wooten	So

Defense

Pos.	#	Name	Class
DE	98	Ernie Brown	So
SS	27	Bob Grosvenor	So
LB	95	Garland Hawkins	Jr
FS	18	Tony Jones	Fr
CB	9	Dwayne Joseph	So
DT	85	Scott Langenheim	Jr
LB	39	John Lusardi	Sr
DL	50	Kevin Mitchell	So
DB	28	Tony Montemorra	Sr
DL	91	George Rooks	Sr
DB	37	Tim Sandquist	Sr
LB	57	Chip Todd	So
DB	17	Greg Walker	Sr
DL	77	Jim Wentworth	Sr
LB	83	Jo Jo Wooden	Jr
LB	52	Glen Young	Jr

Special teams

Pos.	#	Name	Class
K	1	John Biskup	Jr
P	4	Pat O'Neill	So

Head coach

- Frank Maloney

Coordinators/assistant coaches

Legend

- (C) Team captain
- (S) Suspended
- (I) Ineligible
- Injured
- Redshirt

== 1991 team players in the NFL ==
Player	Round	Pick	Position	Club
George Rooks	10	265	Defensive Tackle	New York Giants
