= Gino Torretta =

American football player (born 1970)

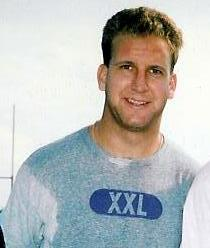
- Torretta in 1993

No. 13
- Position: Quarterback

Personal information
- Born: August 10, 1970 (age 56); Pinole, California, U.S.
- Listed height: 6 ft 2 in (1.88 m)
- Listed weight: 215 lb (98 kg)

Career information
- High school: Pinole Valley
- College: Miami (1989–1992)
- NFL draft: 1993: 7th round, 192nd overall pick

Career history
- Minnesota Vikings (1993); Detroit Lions (1994); Rhein Fire (1995); San Francisco 49ers (1995–1996); Seattle Seahawks (1996–1997); Indianapolis Colts (1997); Kansas City Chiefs (1999)*
- * Offseason or practice squad member only

Awards and highlights
- 2× National champion (1989, 1991); Heisman Trophy (1992); Unanimous All-American (1992); 2× Big East Player of the Year (1991, 1992)

Career NFL statistics
- Passing attempts: 16
- Passing completions: 5
- Completion percentage: 31.3%
- TD–INT: 1–1
- Passing yards: 41
- Passer rating: 35.4
- Stats at Pro Football Reference
- College Football Hall of Fame

Gino Louis Torretta (born August 10, 1970) is an American former professional football player who was a quarterback for five seasons in the National Football League (NFL). He played college football for the Miami Hurricanes, where he won the Heisman Trophy in 1992 and was a member of the national championship teams of 1989 and 1991. He was selected by the Minnesota Vikings in the seventh round of the 1993 NFL draft and was a member of several NFL teams, but never became a regular starter as a pro. He was inducted into the College Football Hall of Fame in 2010.

== Early life ==
Torretta was born in Pinole, California. He graduated from Pinole Valley High School, where he was a standout high school football quarterback for the Pinole Spartans.

== College career ==
Torretta accepted an athletic scholarship to attend the University of Miami, where he played for the Miami Hurricanes football team from 1989 to 1992.

=== 1989 and 1990 seasons ===
As a quarterback for the Hurricanes, Torretta spent his first two seasons mostly on the bench behind then starting quarterback Craig Erickson, with his only significant playing time coming with three starts in 1989 after Erickson injured his throwing hand. During that span, however, the then-unknown Torretta lit up San Diego State for 485 yards, setting a school record for most passing yards in a game that was only broken on September 29, 2012, by Stephen Morris.

==== Sebastian the Ibis incident ====
Prior to an October 28, 1989, game against long-standing rival Florida State at Doak Campbell Stadium in Tallahassee, University of Miami mascot Sebastian the Ibis was tackled by a group of police officers for attempting to put out Osceola and Renegade's flaming spear. Sebastian was wearing a fireman's helmet and yellow raincoat and holding a fire extinguisher. When a police officer attempted to grab the fire extinguisher, the officer was sprayed in the chest. Sebastian was handcuffed by four officers and detained but ultimately released. Torretta, who started that game for Miami, later told ESPN, "Even if we weren't bad boys, it added to the mystique that, 'Man, look, even their mascot's getting arrested.'"

=== 1991 season ===
In his first year as a starter, Torretta garnered further attention by stealing the show in a nationally televised 1991 game versus the Houston Cougars and their Heisman-frontrunning quarterback, David Klingler. As Miami's defense stymied Houston's run-and-shoot offense with relentless blitzing, Torretta put on the performance that many expected out of Klingler en route to a 40–10 victory; Klingler's lone touchdown pass in the game came with three seconds left in the fourth quarter against Miami's third-string defense, long after the game was decided. Torretta went on to lead Miami to a fourth-quarter comeback win on the road versus #1 Florida State and ultimately to an undefeated season and a co-national championship.

=== 1992 season ===
Torretta passed for more than 3,000 yards his senior year in 1992 on his way to winning the Heisman Trophy and the Davey O'Brien Award that season. He also won the Walter Camp Award, the Maxwell Award, the Johnny Unitas Trophy, and the Chic Harley Award. One of the key games of the season came against West Virginia when he threw for 363 yards and two touchdowns in the 35–23 victory. His career as quarterback at Miami was hugely successful, with Torretta leading the team to 26 wins and only one loss, which came in the 1993 Sugar Bowl where the Hurricanes were dominated by the Alabama Crimson Tide's defense. Torretta was flummoxed by Alabama's 11-man fronts, and threw three interceptions after only throwing four all season. Alabama won the game, 34–13, and the national championship.

=== College statistics ===
Season	Team	Cmp	Att	Pct	Yds	TD	Int
1989	Miami	101	177	57.1	1,325	8	8
1990	Miami	21	41	51.2	210	0	1
1991	Miami	205	371	55.3	3,095	20	8
1992	Miami	228	402	56.7	3,060	19	7

=== Awards and honors ===
- 2× National champion (1989, 1991)
- Heisman Trophy (1992)
- Maxwell Award (1992)
- Walter Camp Award (1992)
- Chic Harley Award (1992)
- Davey O'Brien Award (1992)
- Johnny Unitas Golden Arm Award (1992)
- Unanimous All-American (1992)
- 2× Big East Player of the Year (1991, 1992)

== Professional career ==
=== 1993–1994 ===
Pre-draft measurables
Height	Weight	Arm length	Hand span	Vertical jump
6 ft 2 in (1.88 m)	219 lb (99 kg)	29 3/8 in (0.75 m)	9 3/8 in (0.24 m)	31.0 in (0.79 m)

Despite his collegiate-level success, Torretta was not regarded as a high-level NFL prospect, and his NFL career was unremarkable. He was selected by the Minnesota Vikings in the seventh round in the 1993 NFL Draft with the 192nd overall pick. Torretta did not appear in an NFL game that season. In 1994, Torretta was on the Vikings' roster, and then was picked up by the Detroit Lions. Again, he did not play at all that year, serving the entire season in a backup role with the Lions.

=== 1995–1999 ===
In 1995, Torretta moved to NFL Europe and was also on the roster for the San Francisco 49ers and Detroit Lions but was again relegated to backup roles. He was cut by the 49ers in 1996 and subsequently picked up by the Seattle Seahawks. His only chance to play in an NFL game came in the 1996 season finale when he came off the bench for the Seahawks against the Oakland Raiders. He immediately threw a 32-yard touchdown pass to Joey Galloway that put Seattle ahead, leading the team to victory.

In 1997, Torretta was on the roster for Seattle and later the Indianapolis Colts but again did not play. After a brief stint with Kansas City in 1999, he retired from the NFL.

== Post-football career ==
Following his NFL career, Torretta founded Touchdown Radio in 2005, a nationally syndicated radio broadcast, featuring a weekly NCAA football game. He is also an NCAA football expert analyst on SiriusXM channel 91, College Sports Nation.

Previously he held a position at Wachovia Securities as a senior financial advisor. Later he became vice president for GAMCO Asset Management, working with institutional clients nationwide out of the firm's Palm Beach office.

On September 18, 2025, The University of Miami announced that Max Chira, a UM fan, has made a $1.81 million donation that will be used to construct life-sized statues of Torretta and Vinny Testaverde on campus outside the Schwartz Center for Athletic Excellence.
