= 1991 Rutgers Scarlet Knights football team =

American college football season

1991 Rutgers Scarlet Knights football
- Conference: Big East Conference
- Record: 6–5 (2–3 Big East)
- Head coach: Doug Graber (2nd season)
- Offensive coordinator: Stan Parrish (2nd season)
- Defensive coordinator: Rich Rachel (2nd season)
- Home stadium: Rutgers Stadium; Giants Stadium

1991 Big East Conference football standings
	Conf.					Overall
Team	W		L		T	W		L		T
No. 11 Syracuse	5	–	0	–	0	10	–	2	–	0
No. 1 Miami (FL)	2	–	0	–	0	12	–	0	–	0
Virginia Tech	1	–	0	–	0	5	–	6	–	0
Pittsburgh	3	–	2	–	0	6	–	5	–	0
West Virginia	3	–	4	–	0	6	–	5	–	0
Rutgers	2	–	3	–	0	6	–	5	–	0
Boston College	2	–	4	–	0	4	–	7	–	0
Temple	0	–	5	–	0	2	–	9	–	0
The Big East did not crown an official champion until 1993 when full league play began.; Rankings from AP Poll

The 1991 Rutgers Scarlet Knights football team represented Rutgers University in the 1991 NCAA Division I-A football season. In their second season under head coach Doug Graber, the Scarlet Knights compiled a 6–5 record, scored 217 points, allowed 217 points, and finished in sixth place in the Big East Conference. The team's statistical leaders included Tom Tarver with 1,969 passing yards, Antoine Moore with 627 rushing yards, and James Guarantino with 740 receiving yards.

== Schedule ==
Date	Opponent	Site	Result	Attendance	Source
August 31	Boston College	Rutgers Stadium; Piscataway, NJ	W 20–13	22,185	
September 4	at Duke*	Wallace Wade Stadium; Durham, NC	L 22–42	15,400	
September 21	Northwestern*	Rutgers Stadium; Piscataway, NJ	W 22–18	17,046	
September 28	at Michigan State*	Spartan Stadium; East Lansing, MI	W 14–7	67,636	
October 5	Army*	Giants Stadium; East Rutherford, NJ	W 14–12	27,505	
October 12	Maine*	Rutgers Stadium; Piscataway, NJ	W 40–17	27,221	
October 19	at No. 10 Penn State*	Beaver Stadium; University Park, PA	L 17–37	95,729	
October 26	No. 18 Syracuse	Rutgers Stadium; Piscataway, NJ	L 7–21	30,162	
November 2	at West Virginia	Mountaineer Field; Morgantown, WV	L 3–28	38,127	
November 9	at Pittsburgh	Pitt Stadium; Pittsburgh, PA	L 17–22	19,680	
November 16	Temple	Rutgers Stadium; Piscataway, NJ	W 41–0	17,929	
*Non-conference game; Rankings from AP Poll released prior to the game

== Roster ==
1991 Rutgers Scarlet Knights football team roster
Players
Coaches
Offense

Pos.	#	Name	Class
WR	12	Chris Brantley	Jr
WR	18	Jim Guarantano	Sr
TE	88	Chris Stoll	Sr
QB	13	Tom Tarver	Sr

Defense

Pos.	#	Name	Class
CB	1	Ron Allen	Sr
FS	9	Jay Bellamy	So
LB	44	Frank Cuozzo	Sr
LB	55	Todd Lane	Sr
LB	93	Elnardo Webster	Sr

Special teams

Pos.	#	Name	Class

Head coach

- Doug Graber

Coordinators/assistant coaches

Legend

- (C) Team captain
- (S) Suspended
- (I) Ineligible
- Injured
- Redshirt
