= 1991 Boston College Eagles football team =

American college football season

1991 Boston College Eagles football
- Conference: Big East Conference
- Record: 4–7 (2–4 Big East)
- Head coach: Tom Coughlin (1st season)
- Offensive coordinator: Tom Coughlin (1st season)
- Defensive coordinator: Steve Szabo (1st season)
- Captain: Game captains
- Home stadium: Alumni Stadium

1991 Big East Conference football standings
	Conf.					Overall
Team	W		L		T	W		L		T
No. 11 Syracuse	5	–	0	–	0	10	–	2	–	0
No. 1 Miami (FL)	2	–	0	–	0	12	–	0	–	0
Virginia Tech	1	–	0	–	0	5	–	6	–	0
Pittsburgh	3	–	2	–	0	6	–	5	–	0
West Virginia	3	–	4	–	0	6	–	5	–	0
Rutgers	2	–	3	–	0	6	–	5	–	0
Boston College	2	–	4	–	0	4	–	7	–	0
Temple	0	–	5	–	0	2	–	9	–	0
The Big East did not crown an official champion until 1993 when full league play began.; Rankings from AP Poll

The 1991 Boston College Eagles football team represented Boston College in the 1991 NCAA Division I-A football season. The Eagles were led by first-year head coach Tom Coughlin, and played their home games at Alumni Stadium in Chestnut Hill, Massachusetts. They competed as members of the Big East Conference, in the conference's inaugural year of football sponsorship. As a result, Big East members, including Boston College, played a limited conference schedule in order to complete prior scheduling commitments.

== Schedule ==
Date	Opponent	Site	Result	Attendance	Source
August 31	at Rutgers	Rutgers Stadium; Piscataway, NJ	L 13–20	22,185	
September 7	No. 2 Michigan*	Alumni Stadium; Chestnut Hill, MA	L 13–35	32,071	
September 14	No. 17 Georgia Tech*	Alumni Stadium; Chestnut Hill, MA	L 14–30	26,018	
September 28	at No. 10 Penn State*	Beaver Stadium; University Park, PA	L 21–28	95,927	
October 12	Louisville*	Alumni Stadium; Chestnut Hill, MA	W 33–3	27,839	
October 19	West Virginia	Alumni Stadium; Chestnut Hill, MA	L 24–31	28,162	
October 26	at Army*	Michie Stadium; West Point, NY	W 28–17	41,209	
November 2	Pittsburgh	Alumni Stadium; Chestnut Hill, MA	W 38–12	25,872	
November 9	at Temple	Veterans Stadium; Philadelphia, PA	W 33–13	12,950	
November 16	at No. 17 Syracuse	Carrier Dome; Syracuse, NY	L 16–38	45,453	
November 23	No. 1 Miami (FL)	Alumni Stadium; Chestnut Hill, MA	L 14–19	32,071	
*Non-conference game; Rankings from AP Poll released prior to the game

== Roster ==
1991 Boston College Eagles football team roster
Players
Coaches
Offense

Pos.	#	Name	Class
TE	89	Mark Chmura	Sr
QB	13	Glenn Foley	So
RB	30	David Green	Fr
TE	82	Pete Mitchell	Fr
C	64	Tom Nalen	So

Defense

Pos.	#	Name	Class
LB	50	Stephen Boyd	Fr
FS	28	Charlie Brennan	Jr
LB	53	Tom McManus	Jr
DB	17	Michael Reed	Fr
DT	67	Ron Stone	Jr

Special teams

Pos.	#	Name	Class

Head coach

- Tom Coughlin

Coordinators/assistant coaches

- Gary Crowton (Quarterbacks)

Legend

- (C) Team captain
- (S) Suspended
- (I) Ineligible
- Injured
- Redshirt

== After the season ==
=== NFL draft ===
The Eagle was selected in the 1992 NFL draft following the season.

Round	Pick	Player	Position	NFL team
6	157	Mark Chmura	Tight end	Green Bay Packers
