= Ray Handley =

American football player and coach (1944–2026)

Personal information
- Born: October 8, 1944; Artesia, New Mexico, U.S.
- Died: February 5, 2026 (aged 81)

Career information
- High school: Reno (NV)
- College: Stanford

Career history
- Stanford (1967) Graduate assistant; Army (1968–1969) Assistant coach; Stanford (1971–1974) Assistant coach; Air Force (1975–1978) Offensive backfield coach; Stanford (1979–1983) Linebackers coach; New York Giants (1984–1990) Offensive backfield coach; New York Giants (1991–1992) Head coach

Awards and highlights
- 2× Super Bowl champion (XXI, XXV); First-team All-PCC (1964)

Head coaching record
- Regular season: 14–18 (.438)
- Coaching profile at Pro Football Reference

Robert Ray Handley (October 8, 1944 – February 5, 2026) was an American football player and coach. He is best remembered for his stormy two seasons as a head coach in the National Football League (NFL) for the New York Giants from 1991 to 1992.

== Early life ==
Handley was born in Artesia, New Mexico, on October 8, 1944, to Robert Douglas Handley, a rancher, and Ruby Handley (née Kennedy), a teacher. The family moved to Reno, where Handley was an all-state high school football player.

== Collegiate career ==
Handley played three seasons as a running back for Stanford beginning in 1963. During his junior season, he rushed for 936 yards, with his long ground gains during the November 14, 1964 contest against Oregon State, helping to upset the Beavers, 16–7. The following year began with talks of potential All-American honors, but ended in disappointment. Handley's running did help defeat arch-rival California, 9–7, in the 1965 edition of the Big Game on November 21.

== Brief professional playing career ==
Handley was signed by the American Football League's San Diego Chargers on June 11, 1966, but voluntarily left camp one month later, putting an end to his playing career.

== Coaching career ==
The following year, he returned to his alma mater as an assistant coach, then headed east in 1968 for two years as an assistant at Army. One of his fellow coaches during this period was Bill Parcells, a connection that would prove fruitful in the future. Following a year out of the game in 1970, Handley returned the following year for the first of four more seasons at Stanford.

In 1975, Handley shifted to coaching another branch of the armed services when he accepted an assistant position at the United States Air Force Academy. In his final year, Parcells served as head coach, but after his departure, Handley once again returned to Stanford, serving five years under both Rod Dowhower and Paul Wiggin.

=== New York Giants ===
On February 28, 1984, Handley was named the offensive backfield coach for the New York Giants under Parcells, beginning a seven-year stretch that saw the team capture two Super Bowls wins. Following the Giants' second title in Super Bowl XXV that season, Parcells announced his retirement, and Handley was then promoted to his first head coaching position on May 15, 1991.

George Young picked Handley to serve as head coach of the Giants after then-Giants defensive coordinator Bill Belichick left to coach the Cleveland Browns. The bad relationship between Young and Belichick also played into Handley's promotion; Young had consistently given a negative review about Belichick when teams with potential coaching opportunities inquired about him, and never felt his defensive coordinator had the leadership abilities to run his own team. In addition, the team's wide receivers coach under Parcells, Tom Coughlin, whom Young had considerable respect for and would probably have promoted to head coach after Parcells' departure if the timing had worked, quickly moved on after the Super Bowl and was hired as head coach at Boston College.

==== Head coaching stint ====
With the NFL Draft in the rearview, Handley was dealt a short time window to prepare for his first season as head coach. In 1991, Handley's first major decision of his tenure was who would be the starting quarterback. The previous season, Phil Simms had guided the Giants to an 11–2 record before suffering a leg injury. Backup Jeff Hostetler finished the regular season, and led the Giants to upset victories against the San Francisco 49ers in the NFC Championship game and the Buffalo Bills in the Super Bowl. Handley announced that the two quarterbacks would compete for the starting job. This caused some controversy as both fans and commentators felt that Simms should not lose his starting job due to injury. Nonetheless, Hostetler won the battle in training camp and was announced as the starting quarterback.

Handley's first game as head coach was a Monday Night Football game against the San Francisco 49ers (a rematch of the 1990 NFC Championship). The Giants would win that game, but Handley would be most remembered for wearing an unusually-designed logo shirt (bearing the New York Giants colors and logo). The Monday Night Football win helped Handley with most Giants fans, but when the team finished with an 8–8 record and out of the playoff picture, fan support quickly eroded. One fan held up a sign reading: "From the Super Bowl to the toilet bowl. Thanks, Ray." Fans also chanted "Ray must go!" during the 1991 and 1992 seasons, a play on the "Joe must go!" chants that New York Jets fans had delivered when Joe Walton had been coaching that team a few years earlier. In 1992, the team fell further to a 6–10 record, leading a combative Handley to trade verbal darts with both the media and his players.

His relationship with the defensive players was also strained, particularly when he tapped Rod Rust to be the defensive coordinator in 1992. The defense was not thrilled about Rust's hiring, especially knowing that the veteran coach was coming off a 1–15 mark as head coach of the New England Patriots in 1990. Additionally, the players preferred a more aggressive scheme to Rust's read-and-react scheme. This led to some frustration during games, where the players would often ignore Rust's calls and call their own defensive assignments in the huddle. Handley's communication with the media became another reason for his dismissal, as he would often refuse to answer questions, even going as far as walking out of one press conference after being asked about his handling of Hostetler and Simms as the team's starting quarterback. He scoffed at the question, calling it "ridiculous" and unfair to him and his quarterbacks. After the reporter persisted about why he would not answer the question, Handley stormed off while telling the rest of the reporters to "get him straightened out."

== Post-NFL life ==
Handley was officially fired on December 30, 1992, and replaced by former Denver Broncos head coach Dan Reeves. Following his departure, Handley largely withdrew from the public eye. He later resided in the Lake Tahoe area. Before Super Bowl XLII in 2008 when the Giants were playing the Patriots, Newsday reporter Jim Baumbach unearthed Handley's unlisted home telephone number and called him, in the hopes of talking about the Giants. Handley was unhappy at being contacted, and after being told it was for a "where are they now" interview, he said "No, I'm not the least bit interested. Thank you very much." and hung up the phone, making his lone post-firing public statement a very brief one.

Handley died on February 5, 2026, at the age of 81.

== Head coaching record ==
Team	Year	Regular Season					Postseason			
Team	Year	Won	Lost	Ties	Win %	Finish	Won	Lost	Win %	Result
NYG	1991	8	8	0	.500	4th in NFC East	–	–	–	–
NYG	1992	6	10	0	.375	4th in NFC East	–	–	–	–
NYG total		14	18	0	.438		–	–	–	
Total		14	18	0	.438					

== See also ==
- History of the New York Giants (1979–1993)
