= 1991 Army Cadets football team =

American college football season

1991 Army Cadets football
- Conference: Independent
- Record: 4–7
- Head coach: Bob Sutton (1st season)
- Offensive coordinator: Greg Gregory (3rd as OC; 10th overall season)
- Offensive scheme: Triple option
- Defensive coordinator: Denny Doornbos (1st season)
- Base defense: 4–3
- Captains: Lance Chambers; Willie McMillian; Myreon Williams
- Home stadium: Michie Stadium

1991 NCAA Division I-A independents football records
	Conf.			Overall
Team	W	L	T	W		L		T
No. 9 East Carolina		–		11	–	1	–	0
No. 4 Florida State		–		11	–	2	–	0
No. 3 Penn State		–		11	–	2	–	0
No. 21 Tulsa		–		10	–	2	–	0
Louisiana Tech		–		8	–	1	–	2
No. 13 Notre Dame		–		10	–	3	–	0
Akron		–		5	–	6	–	0
Memphis State		–		5	–	6	–	0
Army		–		4	–	7	–	0
Cincinnati		–		4	–	7	–	0
Southern Miss		–		4	–	7	–	0
South Carolina		–		3	–	6	–	2
Southwestern Louisiana		–		2	–	8	–	1
Louisville		–		2	–	9	–	0
Northern Illinois		–		2	–	9	–	0
Tulane		–		1	–	10	–	0
Navy		–		1	–	10	–	0
Rankings from AP Poll

The 1991 Army Cadets football team was an American football team that represented the United States Military Academy as an independent during the 1991 NCAA Division I-A football season. In their first season under head coach Bob Sutton, the Cadets compiled a 4–7 record and were outscored by their opponents by a total of 226 to 196. In the annual Army–Navy Game, the Cadets lost to Navy, 24–3.

== Schedule ==
Date	Opponent	Site	Result	Attendance	Source
September 14	Colgate	Michie Stadium; West Point, NY	W 51–22	29,924	
September 21	North Carolina	Michie Stadium; West Point, NY	L 12–20	36,609	
September 28	Harvard	Michie Stadium; West Point, NY	W 21–20	35,881	
October 5	vs. Rutgers	Giants Stadium; East Rutherford, NJ	L 12–14	27,505	
October 12	The Citadel	Michie Stadium; West Point, NY	L 14–20	40,459	
October 19	at Louisville	Cardinal Stadium; Louisville, KY	W 37–12	33,147	
October 26	Boston College	Michie Stadium; West Point, NY	L 17–28	41,209	
November 2	Vanderbilt	Michie Stadium; West Point, NY	L 10–41	35,112	
November 9	at Air Force	Falcon Stadium; Colorado Springs, CO (Commander-in-Chief's Trophy)	L 0–25	49,203	
November 16	Akron	Michie Stadium; West Point, NY	W 19–0	34,410	
December 7	vs. Navy	Veterans Stadium; Philadelphia, PA (Army–Navy Game)	L 3–24	67,858	

== Game summaries ==
=== Navy ===
Army Cadets (4–6) vs. Navy Midshipmen (0–10)

Quarter	1	2	3	4	Total
Navy	0	14	0	10	24
Army	3	0	0	0	3

at Veterans Stadium, Philadelphia, Pennsylvania

- Date: December 7, 1991
- Game weather: Sunny
- Game attendance: 67,858
- TV announcers (ABC): Keith Jackson, Bob Griese, and Jack Arute
- New York Times. 1991 Dec 08.

Game information

First quarter

- ARMY – Patmon Malcolm 39-yard field goal. Army 3–0. Drive: 43 yards.

Second quarter

- NAVY – Jason Van Matre 3-yard run (kick good). Navy 7–3. Drive: 76 yards.
- NAVY – Billy James 5-yard run (kick good). Navy 14–3. Drive: 8 plays, 25 yards.

Fourth quarter

- NAVY – Kevin Hickman 12-yard pass from Jason Van Matre (kick good). Navy 21–3. Drive:
- NAVY – Tim Rogers 31-yard field goal. Navy 24–3. Drive:

Top passers

- NAVY – Jim Kubiak – 13/16, 157 yards
- ARMY

Top rushers

- NAVY – Jason Van Matre – 25 rushes, 89 yards, TD
- ARMY

Top receivers

- NAVY
- ARMY

== Roster ==
1991 Army Cadets football team roster
Players
Coaches
Offense

Pos.	#	Name	Class
RB		Boris Barlatier
QB		Peter Carey
OL		Steve Chalout
TE		Bill Currence
RB	33	Chad Davis
TE		Mark Dawkins
OL		Mark Escobedo
RB		Phil Fant
OL		Jason Giles
QB		Devin Hatfield
OL		Kaylan Kennel
RB		John Lane
RB		Corbett Leatherwood
RB		Rob Martinez
QB		Willie McMillian
OL		Dan Menendez
RB		Edrian Oliver
OL		John Pirog
RB		Joe Ross
OL		Aaron Scott
WR		Chris Shaw
RB		Arlen Smith
RB		Callian Thomas
WR		Monte Tomasino
RB		Steve Weber
QB		Myreon Williams

Defense

Pos.	#	Name	Class
LB		John Beatty
DL		Lance Chambers
LB		Tony Cima
LB		Kevin Czarnecki
DL		Dan Davis
LB		Aaron Fogelsong
DB		Chuck Gibbs
LB		Trey Gilmore
DL		Gary Graves
DB		Duncan Johnson
LB		Chris Knox
S		Mike McElrath
LB		Jason Miller
DB		Kyle Peavler
LB		Rick Pressel
DB		Kevin Vaughn
DL		Kevin Walker
DL		Sean Gladieux

Special teams

Pos.	#	Name	Class
P		Todd Hawkins
K		Patmon Malcolm

Head coach

- Bob Sutton

Coordinators/assistant coaches

Legend

- (C) Team captain
- (S) Suspended
- (I) Ineligible
- Injured
- Redshirt
