= 1991 Temple Owls football team =

American college football season

1991 Temple Owls football
- Conference: Big East Conference
- Record: 2–9 (0–5 Big East)
- Head coach: Jerry Berndt (3rd season)
- Home stadium: Veterans Stadium

1991 Big East Conference football standings
	Conf.					Overall
Team	W		L		T	W		L		T
No. 11 Syracuse	5	–	0	–	0	10	–	2	–	0
No. 1 Miami (FL)	2	–	0	–	0	12	–	0	–	0
Virginia Tech	1	–	0	–	0	5	–	6	–	0
Pittsburgh	3	–	2	–	0	6	–	5	–	0
West Virginia	3	–	4	–	0	6	–	5	–	0
Rutgers	2	–	3	–	0	6	–	5	–	0
Boston College	2	–	4	–	0	4	–	7	–	0
Temple	0	–	5	–	0	2	–	9	–	0
The Big East did not crown an official champion until 1993 when full league play began.; Rankings from AP Poll

The 1991 Temple Owls football team represented Temple University as a member of the Big East Conference during the 1991 NCAA Division I-A football season. Led by third-year head coach Jerry Berndt, the Owls compiled an overall record of 2–9 with a mark of 0–5 in conference play, placing last out of eight teams in the Big East. Temple played home games at Veterans Stadium in Philadelphia.

== Schedule ==
Date	Time	Opponent	Site	TV	Result	Attendance	Source
September 7	4:00 pm	at No. 20 Alabama*	Legion Field; Birmingham, AL	PPV	L 3–41	83,091	
September 14	12:00 pm	at No. 24 Pittsburgh	Pitt Stadium; Pittsburgh, PA	ESPN Events	L 7–26	31,084	
September 21	1:00 pm	at No. 8 Clemson*	Memorial Stadium; Clemson, SC		L 7–37	74,575	
September 28		Howard*	Veterans Stadium; Philadelphia, PA		W 40–0	23,870	
October 5		No. 12 Penn State*	Veterans Stadium; Philadelphia, PA		L 7–24	43,808	
October 12	1:00 pm	at West Virginia	Mountaineer Field; Morgantown, WV		L 9–10	43,767	
October 19		Navy*	Veterans Stadium; Philadelphia, PA		W 21–14	17,450	
November 2	1:30 pm	at No. 18 Syracuse	Carrier Dome; Syracuse, NY		L 6–27	46,819	
November 9		Boston College	Veterans Stadium; Philadelphia, PA		L 13–33	12,950	
November 16		at Rutgers	Rutgers Stadium; Piscataway, NJ		L 0–41	17,929	
November 23		Akron*	Veterans Stadium; Philadelphia, PA		L 32–37	5,183	
*Non-conference game; Rankings from AP Poll released prior to the game; All times are in Eastern time; Source:
