= Anthony Hamlet =

Former public official

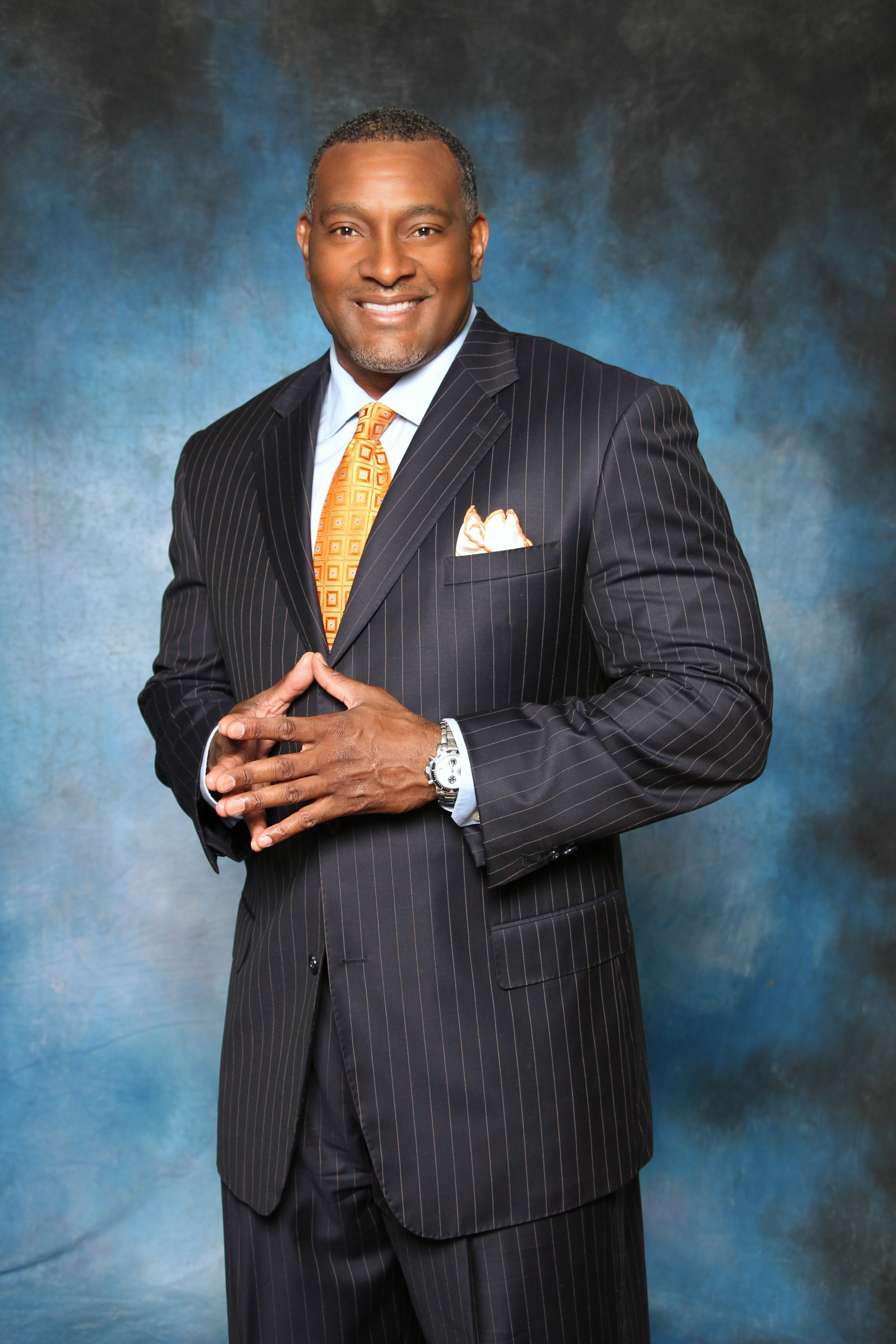

Anthony Hamlet was the superintendent of the Pittsburgh Public Schools in Pittsburgh, Pennsylvania, from July 1, 2016 to October 1, 2021. In September 2021, Hamlet announced his resignation as superintendent following a state investigation that found he committed multiple ethics violations. He played football for the University of Miami and was drafted by the Seattle Seahawks in the 1992 NFL Draft.

== Education ==
Hamlet attended public schools in Palm Beach County, Florida. In 1992, he earned a bachelor's degree in general studies from the University of Miami, where he was a starting defensive tackle on the Hurricanes' undefeated 1991 team, which was national co-champion.

He earned two degrees at Nova Southeastern University: a master's in education leadership in 2003 and a doctorate in education in 2007. In 2015, he was a member of the first class at the AASA-Howard University Urban Superintendent Academy, a program intended to train leaders for urban school districts.

== Career ==
Hamlet was drafted by the Seattle Seahawks in the 10th round (283rd pick) of the 1992 NFL draft. He was a defensive end for the Indianapolis Colts in 1993, but did not play in any games. Hamlet said he also played for the Winnipeg Blue Bombers of the Canadian Football League for a short time.

He began his educational career as a case manager and behavioral specialist with a Palm Beach County, Florida, mental health unit. He subsequently held positions as teacher, dean of students, assistant principal, principal, and district administrator, mostly with the School District of Palm Beach County. He worked in many different educational settings: urban and suburban, affluent and poverty-stricken, and with high-performing and low-performing schools.

=== Pittsburgh Public Schools ===
In October 2015, the Pittsburgh Public Schools commissioned a national search for a new superintendent. In January 2016, their independent consultants issued a public call for applicants. Hamlet submitted his application in March 2016, including a five-page resume and several letters of recommendation. Two months later the school board unanimously voted to hire him as superintendent, with a five-year contract and an annual salary of $210,000. His first day as superintendent was July 1, 2016.

Almost immediately after he was hired in Pittsburgh and before his first day on the job, it was uncovered that Hamlet lied on his resume about having turned around two schools from F to C ratings under Florida's state evaluation system. Instead, one school rose from a D to a C, and the other was a C the whole time he was in charge. Of the latter school, state officials acknowledged that test scores did improve slightly, but that the school declined in other areas enough to offset the gains in test scores. After this came out, the school board president and teachers union defended Hamlet, saying that he was needed for his record on turning schools around, despite the fact that it was his claimed record of turning schools around that he had lied about.

The school district reviewed a trip several administrators took to Cuba in April 2019 without the required approval of the school board. Hamlet and five administrators accepted a trip to Cuba with travel and accommodations paid for by an education consulting group, The Flying Classroom. The trip raised questions in regard to state ethics laws.

In an investigation report released in August 2021 by the Pennsylvania State Ethics Commission, Hamlet was cited with multiple ethics violations, including improperly receiving travel reimbursements, getting payments for appearances related to his job, and incorrectly filing financial documents. He was ordered to pay nearly $8,000 and to forfeit two weeks of vacation, valued at over $12,000. Hamlet stated at a news conference that he did nothing wrong and said the violations were due to clerical errors, a lack of ethics training, and a clause in his contract regarding receiving payment for speeches that conflicted with state ethics laws. The executive director of the Ethics Commission, Robert Caruso, said Hamlet's conduct occurred over a number of years and "was an egregious violation of the public trust". City and school district controller Michael Lamb, who initiated the complaint with the Ethics Commission in 2019, recommended that the school board fire Hamlet. On September 8, 2021, Hamlet announced his resignation as superintendent. Per the state's school code, he will receive a severance package of just under $400,000, the equivalent of one year's salary and the value of his benefits.
