= 1991 Virginia Tech Hokies football team =

American college football season

1991 Virginia Tech Hokies football
- Conference: Big East Conference
- Record: 5–6 (1–0 Big East)
- Head coach: Frank Beamer (5th season)
- Offensive coordinator: Steve Marshall (4th season)
- Offensive scheme: Pro-style
- Defensive coordinator: Mike Clark (4th season)
- Base defense: 4–4
- Home stadium: Lane Stadium

1991 Big East Conference football standings
| | Conf. | | | | | Overall |
| Team | W | | L | | T | W | | L | | T |
|---|---|---|---|---|---|---|---|---|---|---|
| No. 11 Syracuse | 5 | – | 0 | – | 0 | 10 | – | 2 | – | 0 |
| No. 1 Miami (FL) | 2 | – | 0 | – | 0 | 12 | – | 0 | – | 0 |
| Virginia Tech | 1 | – | 0 | – | 0 | 5 | – | 6 | – | 0 |
| Pittsburgh | 3 | – | 2 | – | 0 | 6 | – | 5 | – | 0 |
| West Virginia | 3 | – | 4 | – | 0 | 6 | – | 5 | – | 0 |
| Rutgers | 2 | – | 3 | – | 0 | 6 | – | 5 | – | 0 |
| Boston College | 2 | – | 4 | – | 0 | 4 | – | 7 | – | 0 |
| Temple | 0 | – | 5 | – | 0 | 2 | – | 9 | – | 0 |
The Big East did not crown an official champion until 1993 when full league play began.; Rankings from AP Poll

The 1991 Virginia Tech Hokies football team represented Virginia Polytechnic Institute and State University as an independent during the 1991 NCAA Division I-A football season. Led by fifth-year head coach Frank Beamer, the Hokies finished the season with a record of 5–6. The team played its home games at Lane Stadium in Blacksburg, Virginia.

The season began with optimism as Virginia Tech opened with a convincing 41–12 win over James Madison, highlighted by a balanced offensive attack and strong defensive play. However, the Hokies struggled to maintain consistency, particularly during a stretch of five consecutive road games in September and October. Losses to NC State, South Carolina, and No. 6 Oklahoma underscored the team’s difficulties against stronger competition, though a 20–14 victory at West Virginia provided one of the season’s high points.

Midseason, Virginia Tech faced No. 1 Florida State and fell 33–20, but the Hokies remained competitive against the nation’s top-ranked team, reflecting gradual improvement under Beamer. Returning home, the Hokies strung together three consecutive victories over Cincinnati, Louisville, and Akron, scoring a combined 139 points and showcasing the potential of quarterback Will Furrer and running back Tony Kennedy.

Despite this surge, Virginia Tech faltered late in the season. A loss to No. 14 East Carolina and a 38–0 shutout defeat at Virginia, marked the fourth losing season in Beamer’s first five years. The finale underscored the program’s ongoing struggles to establish itself against regional rivals, though the competitive performances against ranked opponents hinted at progress.

Over 11 games, Virginia Tech scored 275 points and allowed 229, reflecting both offensive potential and defensive inconsistency. Quarterback Will Furrer passed for 1,862 yards and 10 touchdowns, while Tony Kennedy led the rushing attack with 753 yards and six scores. Marcus Mickel paced the receiving corps with 624 yards, and the defense contributed 22 sacks and 14 interceptions.

Although the Hokies finished below .500, they played two teams in the top 10 and four in the top 20. The season reflected a transitional period for the program. Beamer’s emphasis on special teams and opportunistic defense began to take shape, and the competitive showings against West Virginia and Florida State suggested that Virginia Tech was laying the foundation for future success in the 1990s.

== Schedule ==
| Date | Time | Opponent | Site | TV | Result | Attendance | Source |
|---|---|---|---|---|---|---|---|
| August 31 | 7:00 p.m. | James Madison* | Lane Stadium; Blacksburg, VA | | W 41–12 | 41,623 | |
| September 7 | 1:00 p.m. | at NC State* | Carter–Finley Stadium; Raleigh, NC | | L 0–7 | 44,907 | |
| September 21 | 7:00 p.m. | at South Carolina* | Williams–Brice Stadium; Columbia, SC | | L 21–28 | 68,200 | |
| September 28 | 2:30 p.m. | at No. 6 Oklahoma* | Oklahoma Memorial Stadium; Norman, OK | | L 17–27 | 73,200 | |
| October 5 | 12:00 p.m. | at West Virginia | Mountaineer Field; Morgantown, WV (rivalry) | BEN | W 20–14 | 57,492 | |
| October 12 | 12:00 p.m. | vs. No. 1 Florida State* | Florida Citrus Bowl; Orlando, FL | BEN | L 20–33 | 58,991 | |
| October 19 | 1:00 p.m. | Cincinnati*^{†} | Lane Stadium; Blacksburg, VA | | W 56–9 | 36,312 | |
| October 26 | 12:00 p.m. | Louisville* | Lane Stadium; Blacksburg, VA | | W 43–13 | 45,662 | |
| November 9 | 1:00 p.m. | Akron* | Lane Stadium; Blacksburg, VA | | W 42–24 | 31,221 | |
| November 16 | 1:00 p.m. | No. 14 East Carolina* | Lane Stadium; Blacksburg, VA | | L 17–24 | 48,317 | |
| November 23 | 12:00 p.m. | at No. 20 Virginia* | Scott Stadium; Charlottesville, VA (rivalry) | JPS | L 0–38 | 44,100 | |
*Non-conference game; ^{†}Homecoming; Rankings from AP Poll released prior to the game; All times are in Eastern time

== Game Summaries ==
=== James Madison ===
| Team | 1 | 2 | 3 | 4 | Total |
|---|---|---|---|---|---|
| James Madison | 6 | 0 | 6 | 0 | 12 |
| • Virginia Tech | 14 | 0 | 13 | 14 | 41 |

- Date: August 31
- Location: Lane Stadium, Blacksburg, VA
- Game start: 7:01 p.m. EDT
- Elapsed time: 3:35
- Game attendance: 41,623
- Game weather: Cloudy, 81°F, Winds N 5 mph, 65% chance of rain
Box Score

Virginia Tech opened the 1991 season with a 41–12 win over James Madison at Lane Stadium, using a balanced offense and a disruptive defense to pull away after an early deficit. The Hokies totaled 456 yards of offense and scored 27 points after halftime while holding the Dukes to one third‑down conversion.

James Madison opened the scoring with a 9‑yard touchdown run by Eriq Williams, but Virginia Tech answered with two first‑quarter touchdowns: a 3‑yard run by Tony Kennedy and a 1‑yard run by Phil Bryant. After a scoreless second quarter, the Hokies extended their lead in the third with an 8‑yard touchdown pass from Will Furrer to Marcus Mickel and a 14‑yard touchdown run by Kennedy. In the fourth quarter, Furrer connected with Bo Campbell for touchdown passes of 70 and 16 yards to secure the win.

Furrer led the offense by completing 16 of 22 passes for 227 yards and three touchdowns. Campbell caught two passes for 86 yards and two scores, while Mickel added 61 receiving yards and finished with 152 all‑purpose yards. Vaughn Hebron led all rushers with 90 yards, and Kennedy added 75 yards and two touchdowns.

Virginia Tech’s defense recorded seven sacks for 60 yards. Melendez Byrd led the Hokies with eight tackles. The unit held James Madison to 308 total yards and limited the Dukes to 1 of 11 on third‑down attempts.

The Hokies converted 7 of 12 third downs, scored on all five red‑zone opportunities, and averaged 6.8 yards per play.

=== NC State ===
| Team | 1 | 2 | 3 | 4 | Total |
|---|---|---|---|---|---|
| Virginia Tech | 0 | 0 | 0 | 0 | 0 |
| • NC State | 0 | 7 | 0 | 0 | 7 |

- Date: September 7
- Location: Carter–Finley Stadium, Raleigh, NC
- Game start: 1:02 p.m. EDT
- Elapsed time: 2:33
- Game attendance: 44,907
- Game weather: Partly Sunny, 85°F, Winds NE 10 mph
Box Score

Virginia Tech was shut out 7–0 by NC State in a defensive game defined by turnovers and field position. The Hokies outgained the Wolfpack 279–180 but committed seven turnovers, including five interceptions, and were unable to convert either of their red‑zone opportunities.

NC State scored the game’s only points with one second remaining in the first half on a 10‑yard touchdown pass from Terry Jordan to Shad Santee. Virginia Tech moved the ball effectively at times but saw drives end with interceptions, fumbles, or negative plays, including a second‑quarter red‑zone fumble and a fourth‑quarter possession halted by penalties and a sack.

Will Furrer completed 20 of 37 passes for 198 yards but threw five interceptions. Phil Bryant led the Hokies with 37 receiving yards, while Bo Campbell added 54 and Marcus Mickel contributed 34. On the ground, Tony Kennedy rushed for 30 yards, and Bryant added 23. Virginia Tech averaged 4.6 yards per play but converted only 2 of 14 third‑down attempts.

Virginia Tech’s defense kept the game close by recording five sacks for 68 yards and forcing two fumbles. Ken Brown led the unit with two sacks for 22 yards, and Rusty Pendleton added two tackles for loss and a forced fumble. Preston and Tyronne Drakeford recorded interceptions, and Wooster Pack and Jerome Preston tied for the team lead with seven tackles.

NC State managed 180 total yards and averaged 1.5 yards per rush but benefited from Virginia Tech’s turnovers and short fields. The Wolfpack defense intercepted five passes, recovered two fumbles, and held the Hokies scoreless inside the 20.

=== South Carolina ===
| Team | 1 | 2 | 3 | 4 | Total |
|---|---|---|---|---|---|
| Virginia Tech | 7 | 7 | 7 | 0 | 21 |
| • South Carolina | 14 | 7 | 7 | 0 | 28 |

- Date: September 21
- Location: Williams-Brice, Columbia, SC
- Game start: 7:00 pm
- Elapsed time: 2:46
- Game attendance: 68,200
- Game weather: Prtly Cldy, pleasant, 68°F, Wind 10 NE
Box Score

On the road in Columbia, South Carolina, Virginia Tech outgained the Gamecocks in total yardage and rushing but suffered a 28–21 defeat. Despite totaling 394 yards compared to South Carolina's 326, the Hokies were hampered by three turnovers and a lack of defensive takeaways.

The contest was defined by scoring shifts that saw South Carolina lead early before Virginia Tech rallied to tie the game in the third quarter. The Hokies opened the scoring with a 7-yard Tony Kennedy touchdown run, but the Gamecocks responded with three unanswered touchdowns to take a 21–7 lead. Virginia Tech closed the gap with a 6-yard Bo Campbell touchdown catch just before halftime and tied the score in the third quarter following a 7-yard Campbell reception. South Carolina regained the lead permanently late in the third quarter on a 6-yard Terry Wilburn rushing score.

The Hokies' offense was led by quarterback Will Furrer, who completed 21 of 34 passes for 194 yards and two touchdowns while throwing two interceptions. Tony Kennedy led the rushing attack with 93 yards and one touchdown on 14 carries. Bo Campbell was the primary receiving threat, catching eight passes for 81 yards and both of the team's receiving touchdowns.

Defensively, Jerome Preston led Virginia Tech with eight total tackles. South Carolina’s offense benefited from a highly efficient third-down performance, converting 10 of 16 attempts to maintain drives.

Virginia Tech's rushing attack averaged 4.9 yards per carry, significantly higher than South Carolina's 2.1 average, but the Hokies lost a fumble and surrendered 238 passing yards to the Gamecocks.

=== Oklahoma ===
| Team | 1 | 2 | 3 | 4 | Total |
|---|---|---|---|---|---|
| Virginia Tech | 7 | 3 | 0 | 7 | 17 |
| • Oklahoma | 0 | 13 | 14 | 0 | 27 |

- Date: September 28
- Location: Memorial Stadium, Norman, OK
- Game start: 1:30 pm
- Elapsed time: 3:10
- Game attendance: 73,200
- Game weather: Sunny, 74°F, Wind 16 mph S
Box Score

Turnovers proved costly for the Hokies as they fell 27–17 to No. 6 Oklahoma despite a resilient defensive start. While Virginia Tech led early and outgained the Sooners in passing yardage, three interceptions and a lost fumble undermined their upset bid in Norman.

The Hokies took an early lead in the first quarter when P.J. Preston recovered an Oklahoma fumble in the end zone for a touchdown. Oklahoma responded in the second quarter with 13 unanswered points, including a touchdown pass from Cale Gundy and two Scott Blanton field goals. Virginia Tech narrowed the deficit to 13–10 just before halftime on a 50-yard field goal by Ryan Williams. The Sooners pulled away in the third quarter, scoring twice—once on a 33-yard interception return by Joe Bowden and again on a Gundy rushing touchdown—to extend the lead to 27–10. Virginia Tech added a late score in the fourth quarter on a 5-yard pass from Will Furrer to John Rivers, but an interception on their penultimate drive ended the comeback attempt.

Virginia Tech's offense was powered by Will Furrer, who completed 27 of 50 passes for 268 yards and one touchdown, though he was intercepted three times. Phil Bryant led the rushing effort with 34 yards on nine carries as the Hokies were limited to 81 total rushing yards. Tony Kennedy recorded 65 yards on four receptions, while Greg Daniels added 51 yards on five catches.

Defensively, Jerome Preston led the team with 10 total tackles, including two tackles for loss. P.J. Preston recorded the team's only interception and recovered the fumble for the opening touchdown. The Hokies' defensive unit also recorded one sack, credited to Bryan Campbell.

The Hokies were efficient on third downs, converting 7 of 17 attempts, but struggled with overall consistency as they were held to just 3.1 yards per rushing attempt. Oklahoma maintained the advantage in time of possession, holding the ball for 34:49 compared to Virginia Tech's 25:11.

=== West Virginia ===
| Team | 1 | 2 | 3 | 4 | Total |
|---|---|---|---|---|---|
| • Virginia Tech | 0 | 14 | 6 | 0 | 20 |
| West Virginia | 0 | 7 | 7 | 0 | 14 |

- Date: October 5
- Location: Mountaineer Field, Morgantown, WV
- Game start: 12:08 p.m. EDT
- Elapsed time: 2:58
- Game attendance: 57,492
- Game weather: Heavy rain, 78°F, Winds 12–22 mph
Box Score

The Hokies notched their 500th all‑time victory with a 20–14 win over West Virginia in Morgantown. Playing in a driving rain, Tech scored three touchdowns across the second and third quarters and held off a Mountaineer rally.

Tony Kennedy powered the ground game with two rushing touchdowns — a 7‑yard score in the second quarter and a 1‑yard plunge in the third. Will Furrer connected with Antonio Freeman on a 24‑yard touchdown pass late in the second quarter, giving Tech a 14–7 halftime lead. Kennedy’s second score extended the margin to 20–7, though the extra point attempt failed. Adrian Murrell accounted for both West Virginia touchdowns, including a 19‑yard run to close the third quarter.

Furrer finished 11‑of‑19 for 139 yards and a touchdown. Kennedy carried 27 times for 104 yards and two scores. Phil Bryant added 56 rushing yards and 15 receiving. John Burke hauled in a 48‑yard reception, while Freeman’s lone catch was the 24‑yard touchdown.

Tech’s offense produced 309 yards (170 rushing, 139 passing) and 17 first downs, holding possession for 32:41. The defense was relentless, tallying 8 tackles for loss, 2 sacks, 3 interceptions, and 7 pass breakups. P. J. Preston led with 6 tackles and 3.0 TFLs, while Tyronne Drakeford, Marcus McClung, and DeWayne Knight each picked off a pass.

West Virginia gained 328 yards, including 217 on the ground, but was undone by turnovers — 3 interceptions and 3 lost fumbles.

=== Florida State ===
| Team | 1 | 2 | 3 | 4 | Total |
|---|---|---|---|---|---|
| Virginia Tech | 7 | 7 | 0 | 6 | 20 |
| • Florida State | 7 | 13 | 13 | 0 | 33 |

- Date: October 12
- Location: Florida Citrus Bowl, Orlando, FL
- Game start: 12:10 p.m. EDT
- Elapsed time: 3:20
- Game attendance: 58,991
- Game weather: Sunny, 78°F, Winds W 5 mph, 56% humidity
Box Score

Top-ranked Florida State capitalized on big plays and turnovers to defeat Virginia Tech 33–20 in a neutral-site matchup at the Florida Citrus Bowl. Despite outgaining the Seminoles 420–343 in total yardage and recording more first downs (24–19), the Hokies were undermined by four turnovers, including a 71-yard interception return for a touchdown.

The Hokies struck first when Michael Sturdivant hauled in a 45-yard touchdown pass from Will Furrer. Florida State responded with an 8-yard touchdown run by Edgar Bennett to tie the game. In the second quarter, Terrell Buckley’s 71-yard interception return put FSU ahead, but Tech answered with a 1-yard scoring plunge by Tony Kennedy. The Seminoles regained the lead for good before halftime on a 38-yard pass from Casey Weldon to Kevin Knox. Florida State pulled away in the third quarter with a 6-yard touchdown run by Amp Lee and a 1-yard scoring pass from Weldon to Lonnie Johnson. Virginia Tech added a late score in the fourth quarter on a 1-yard run by Phil Bryant, but a failed two-point conversion attempt prevented them from closing the gap further.

Will Furrer anchored the Hokie offense, completing 21 of 39 passes for 317 yards and one touchdown, though he was intercepted three times. Antonio Freeman led all receivers with 86 yards on four catches, while Steve Sanders added 69 yards on three receptions. Phil Bryant was the leading rusher for Tech, totaling 58 yards and a touchdown on 12 carries.

The Virginia Tech defense recorded five sacks, with John Granby leading the team with eight total tackles and one sack. Other sacks were recorded by Rusty Pendleton, Bryan Campbell, Billy Swarm, and Bernard Basham. Tyronne Drakeford recorded the Hokies' lone interception. The unit limited the Seminoles' passing attack to 186 yards but struggled to contain FSU's efficiency in the red zone, where the Seminoles scored on all three of their opportunities. While the Hokies maintained a significant advantage in time of possession (32:22 to 27:38) and converted 6 of 18 third-down attempts, the four turnovers proved insurmountable against the nation's number-one team.

=== Cincinnati ===
| Team | 1 | 2 | 3 | 4 | Total |
|---|---|---|---|---|---|
| Cincinnati | 0 | 3 | 6 | 0 | 9 |
| • Virginia Tech | 21 | 0 | 28 | 7 | 56 |

- Date: October 19
- Location: Lane Stadium, Blacksburg, VA
- Game start: 1:04 p.m. EDT
- Elapsed time: 3:06
- Game attendance: 36,312
- Game weather: Sunny, 72°F, Winds NW 10–15 mph
Box Score

Virginia Tech overwhelmed Cincinnati 56–9 at Lane Stadium, fueled by a 21-point first quarter and a dominant defensive performance that included two interception returns for touchdowns. The Hokies capitalized on Bearcat miscues and blocked kicks to secure the victory despite being outgained in total yardage 460–348.

The Hokies established control early in the first quarter with three rushing touchdowns: an 11-yard run by Phil Bryant, a 7-yard pass from Will Furrer to John Rivers, and a 3-yard plunge by Vaughn Hebron. After a scoreless second quarter for Tech that saw Cincinnati’s David Rowe convert a 33-yard field goal, the Hokies exploded for 28 points in the third. Bryant and Hebron each added their second rushing scores of the day before Cincinnati answered with their only touchdown—a 77-yard pass from Lance Harp to Damon Bryant. Tech responded immediately with a 64-yard touchdown strike from Furrer to Bo Campbell, followed by Ken Landrum returning a blocked punt 18 yards for a score. Kirk Alexander capped the scoring in the fourth quarter with a 95-yard interception return.

Will Furrer led the passing game, completing 9 of 18 passes for 118 yards and two touchdowns. Bo Campbell was the primary target, recording 76 yards and a touchdown on two receptions. On the ground, Vaughn Hebron paced the Hokies with 105 yards and two touchdowns on 14 carries, while Tony Kennedy added 44 yards.

Defensively, Don Davis led the team with 10 tackles. The Hokies' secondary was highly opportunistic, recording four interceptions. Kirk Alexander provided the defensive highlight with his 95-yard return, while Rusty Pendleton added another pick. The unit also recorded three sacks, with Wooster Pack and Jerome Preston each contributing to the pressure.

While Cincinnati moved the ball effectively behind David Small’s 112 rushing yards and Damon Bryant’s 122 receiving yards, the Bearcats were stymied by five turnovers and a 5-of-20 conversion rate on third downs. Virginia Tech’s special teams played a pivotal role, blocking two punts and maintaining a clean sheet with zero turnovers.

=== Louisville ===
| Team | 1 | 2 | 3 | 4 | Total |
|---|---|---|---|---|---|
| Louisville | 3 | 0 | 10 | 0 | 13 |
| • Virginia Tech | 0 | 31 | 0 | 10 | 41 |

- Date: October 26
- Location: Lane Stadium, Blacksburg, VA
- Game start: 1:09 p.m. EDT
- Elapsed time: 3:06
- Game attendance: 45,662
- Game weather: Sunny, 70°F, Wind SSE 6–10 mph
Box Score

The Hokies defeated Louisville 41–13, fueled by a 31-point second quarter and a defensive performance that recorded six sacks and three interceptions. Despite Louisville gaining 355 total yards, Virginia Tech utilized short fields and significant special teams returns to secure the victory.

Louisville opened the scoring with a first-quarter field goal, but Virginia Tech responded with five consecutive scores in the second quarter to take a 31–3 lead into halftime. The surge included rushing touchdowns from Tony Kennedy and Vaughn Hebron, a field goal from Ryan Williams, and two touchdown passes from Will Furrer. The Cardinals managed a touchdown and a field goal in the third quarter, but the Hokies capped the game in the fourth with another Furrer touchdown pass and a second Williams field goal.

Will Furrer led the offense by completing 10 of 18 passes for 163 yards and three touchdowns. Vaughn Hebron was the leading rusher with 90 yards and a touchdown on 15 carries, while Phil Bryant added 41 rushing yards. Bo Campbell led all receivers with 62 yards and a touchdown on two receptions, and also contributed 102 punt-return yards.

Defensively, P.J. Preston recorded seven tackles and led the unit with 2.0 sacks, an interception, and a forced fumble. Tyronne Drakeford and Kirk Alexander also recorded interceptions. Jerome Preston, Wooster Pack, and Brian Williams each recorded one sack. The defense limited Louisville to 27 net rushing yards on 28 attempts.

Virginia Tech’s efficiency was bolstered by strong field position, aided by Campbell's 67-yard punt return. The Hokies converted 6 of 13 third downs and were a perfect 6-of-6 in red-zone scoring opportunities, while holding Louisville to zero touchdowns in three red-zone chances.

=== Akron ===
| Team | 1 | 2 | 3 | 4 | Total |
|---|---|---|---|---|---|
| Akron | 10 | 0 | 7 | 7 | 24 |
| • Virginia Tech | 7 | 21 | 7 | 7 | 42 |

- Date: November 9
- Location: Lane Stadium, Blacksburg, VA
- Game start: 1:01 p.m. EST
- Elapsed time: 2:49
- Game attendance: 31,221
- Game weather: Cloudy, 35°F, Winds NNE 5–15 mph
Box Score

The Hokies utilized a dominant rushing attack and a 21-point second quarter to defeat Akron 42–24 at Lane Stadium. Virginia Tech controlled the line of scrimmage, outgaining the Zips 539–333 in total yardage and recording 34 first downs.

Akron took an early lead in the first quarter following a field goal and a touchdown pass. Virginia Tech seized momentum in the second quarter, scoring three unanswered touchdowns to take a 28–10 lead into halftime. Although Akron reached the end zone in both the third and fourth quarters, the Hokies answered each score with touchdowns of their own to maintain a double-digit advantage throughout the second half.

Virginia Tech's scoring effort accounted for six touchdowns. Bo Campbell opened the scoring for the Hokies with a 27-yard touchdown reception from Will Furrer in the first quarter. In the second quarter, Tony Kennedy caught a 28-yard touchdown pass from Furrer, followed by a 1-yard touchdown run by Phil Bryant and a 14-yard touchdown run by Kennedy. Kennedy recorded his third score of the game on a 6-yard run in the third quarter, and Bryant finalized the scoring with a 10-yard touchdown run in the fourth quarter.

Phil Bryant led the offensive production with 120 rushing yards and two touchdowns on 21 carries. Tony Kennedy provided significant support on the ground with 114 rushing yards and two rushing scores, while adding a 28-yard touchdown reception. Will Furrer completed 13 of 20 passes for 187 yards and two touchdowns, with Bo Campbell serving as the leading receiver with 63 yards and a touchdown on four catches.

Defensively, the Hokies recorded three interceptions and two sacks. John Granby led the secondary with two interceptions, and Tyronne Drakeford added the third. Ken Brown and Melendez Byrd each recorded one sack, while Brown also recovered a fumble. Rusty Pendleton was the team's leading tackler, finishing the contest with 10 total stops.

Virginia Tech demonstrated high efficiency on critical downs, converting 8 of 12 third-down attempts. The Hokies' ground game accounted for 316 of their 539 total yards, averaging 5.6 yards per carry across 56 rushing attempts.

=== East Carolina ===
| Team | 1 | 2 | 3 | 4 | Total |
|---|---|---|---|---|---|
| • East Carolina | 0 | 7 | 10 | 7 | 24 |
| Virginia Tech | 7 | 7 | 0 | 3 | 17 |

- Date: November 16
- Location: Lane Stadium, Blacksburg, VA
- Game start: 1:01 p.m. EST
- Elapsed time: 2:52
- Game attendance: 48,317
- Game weather: Cloudy, 64°F, Winds NW 12–22 mph
Box Score

East Carolina overcame an early deficit to defeat Virginia Tech 24–17 at Lane Stadium. Despite recording 25 first downs and outrushing the Pirates 219–97, the Hokies were hampered by three interceptions, including one returned 95 yards for an East Carolina touchdown.

The Hokies established a 14–0 lead by the second quarter before the Pirates responded with 17 unanswered points to take the lead in the third. Virginia Tech managed to tie the game in the fourth quarter, but a late touchdown pass by the Pirates secured the victory. Virginia Tech's scoring consisted of three plays. Greg Daniels caught an 11-yard touchdown pass from Rodd Wooten in the first quarter, and Tony Kennedy added a 4-yard touchdown run in the second. Ryan J. Williams provided the final Hokie points with a 47-yard field goal in the fourth quarter.

Tony Kennedy led the rushing attack with 133 yards and a touchdown on 19 carries. Rodd Wooten completed 12 of 24 passes for 143 yards and one touchdown, while Steve Sanders was the leading receiver with three receptions for 40 yards. Phil Bryant and Vaughn Hebron contributed 57 and 47 rushing yards, respectively.

On defense, P.J. Preston recorded two sacks for a loss of 25 yards. Bryan Campbell and Rusty Pendleton each recorded two tackles for loss, while Melendez Byrd and John Granby each registered an interception. Jerome Preston and Marcus McClung each recorded a fumble recovery.

Special teams were highlighted by Marcus McClung, who blocked a punt and returned it 14 yards. Bo Campbell recorded 30 yards on three punt returns, and Jon Jeffries added a 32-yard kickoff return. The Hokies finished with 362 total offensive yards but converted only 1 of 9 third-down attempts.

=== Virginia ===
| Team | 1 | 2 | 3 | 4 | Total |
|---|---|---|---|---|---|
| Virginia Tech | 0 | 0 | 0 | 0 | 0 |
| • Virginia | 7 | 10 | 14 | 7 | 38 |

- Date: November 23
- Location: Scott Stadium, Charlottesville, VA
- Game start: 12:11 p.m. EST
- Elapsed time: 3:11
- Game attendance: 44,100
- Game weather: Superb, 67°F, Winds SE 5–10 mph
Box Score

Virginia shut out Virginia Tech 38–0 at Scott Stadium, fueled by a dominant defensive performance and balanced scoring across all phases of the game. Despite holding the ball for nearly 33 minutes, the Hokies were outgained 451–308 and failed to score on their only red-zone opportunity.

The Cavaliers built a 17–0 lead by halftime and broke the game open immediately in the second half with a 90-yard kickoff return for a touchdown. Virginia added two more touchdowns in the second half while the Hokies' offense was stifled by turnovers and sacks.

Phil Bryant led the Virginia Tech rushing effort with 75 yards on 13 carries, while Maurice DeShazo added 59 yards on the ground. Rodd Wooten completed 9 of 15 passes for 77 yards, with Antonio Freeman serving as the primary target, recording five receptions for 49 yards. The Hokies totaled 308 yards of offense but were held scoreless for the duration of the contest.

Defensively, the Hokies recorded one sack for a loss of two yards, credited to Ken Brown. Wooster Pack, P.J. Preston, and Bryan Campbell each recorded a tackle for loss. John Granby registered the team's lone takeaway with a fumble recovery in the first quarter.

Virginia Tech struggled with efficiency, converting only 5 of 17 third-down attempts and 2 of 4 fourth-down tries. Penalties and ball security also hindered the Hokies, as the team committed 11 penalties for 86 yards and lost two fumbles during the game.
