= 1991 Pittsburgh Panthers football team =

American college football season

1991 Pittsburgh Panthers football
- Conference: Big East Conference
- Record: 6–5 (3–2 Big East)
- Head coach: Paul Hackett (2nd season)
- Offensive coordinator: Bill Meyers (2nd season)
- Offensive scheme: Multiple pro-style
- Defensive coordinator: Fred von Appen (2nd season)
- Base defense: Multiple
- Home stadium: Pitt Stadium

1991 Big East Conference football standings
	Conf.					Overall
Team	W		L		T	W		L		T
No. 11 Syracuse	5	–	0	–	0	10	–	2	–	0
No. 1 Miami (FL)	2	–	0	–	0	12	–	0	–	0
Virginia Tech	1	–	0	–	0	5	–	6	–	0
Pittsburgh	3	–	2	–	0	6	–	5	–	0
West Virginia	3	–	4	–	0	6	–	5	–	0
Rutgers	2	–	3	–	0	6	–	5	–	0
Boston College	2	–	4	–	0	4	–	7	–	0
Temple	0	–	5	–	0	2	–	9	–	0
The Big East did not crown an official champion until 1993 when full league play began.; Rankings from AP Poll

The 1991 Pittsburgh Panthers football team represented the University of Pittsburgh in the 1991 NCAA Division I-A football season. This was Pitt's first season as a football member of the Big East Conference. They had been an independent since the program's inception in 1890.

== Schedule ==
Date	Time	Opponent	Rank	Site	TV	Result	Attendance	Source
August 31	7:30 p.m.	at West Virginia		Mountaineer Field; Morgantown, WV (Backyard Brawl)	ESPN	W 34–3	68,041	
September 7	1:30 p.m.	Southern Miss*		Pitt Stadium; Pittsburgh, PA		W 35–14	34,756	
September 14	12:00 p.m.	Temple	No. 24	Pitt Stadium; Pittsburgh, PA	Big East	W 26–7	31,084	
September 28	3:30 p.m.	at Minnesota*	No. 18	Hubert H. Humphrey Metrodome; Minneapolis, MN	ABC	W 14–13	39,511	
October 5	1:30 p.m.	Maryland*	No. 17	Pitt Stadium; Pittsburgh, PA		W 24–20	38,328	
October 12	1:30 p.m.	at No. 7 Notre Dame*	No. 12	Notre Dame Stadium; Notre Dame, IN (rivalry)	NBC	L 7–42	59,075	
October 19	1:30 p.m.	No. 24 Syracuse^{†}	No. 20	Pitt Stadium; Pittsburgh, PA (rivalry)		L 27–31	42,707	
October 26	1:30 p.m.	at No. 20 East Carolina*	No. 23	Ficklen Memorial Stadium; Greenville, NC		L 23–24	36,000	
November 2	12:00 p.m.	at Boston College		Alumni Stadium; Chestnut Hill, MA	Big East	L 12–38	25,872	
November 9	12:00 p.m.	Rutgers		Pitt Stadium; Pittsburgh, PA	Big East	W 22–17	19,680	
November 28	11:00 a.m.	No. 6 Penn State*		Pitt Stadium; Pittsburgh, PA (rivalry)	ABC	L 20–32	52,219	
*Non-conference game; ^{†}Homecoming; Rankings from AP Poll released prior to the game; All times are in Eastern time; Source:

== Roster ==
1991 Pittsburgh Panthers football team roster
Players
Coaches
Offense

Pos.	#	Name	Class
OL	69	Dan Anderson	Sr
C	62	Jeff Christy	Sr
RB	29	Curtis Martin	Fr
WR	47	Cliff Moncrief	Jr
TE	83	Dave Moore	Sr
QB	10	Alex Van Pelt	Jr

Defense

Pos.	#	Name	Class
DT	90	Tom Barndt	Fr
CB	23	Dave Coleman	Sr
DB	12	Anthony Dorsett	Fr
DT	91	Sean Gilbert	Jr
DE	92	Keith Hamilton	Jr
DB	11	Steve Israel	Sr
DB	42	Vernon Lewis	Jr
LB	48	Ricardo McDonald	Sr

Special teams

Pos.	#	Name	Class
K	9	Scott Kaplan	Jr
K	34	Don Silvestri	Sr

Head coach

- Paul Hackett

Coordinators/assistant coaches

Legend

- (C) Team captain
- (S) Suspended
- (I) Ineligible
- Injured
- Redshirt

== Coaching staff ==
1991 Pittsburgh Panthers football staff
Coaching staff: Paul Hackett – Head coach; Fred von Appen – Assistant head coach/defensive coordinator/defensive line; Bill Meyers – Offensive coordinator/offensive line; Marty Galbraith – Tight ends/kickers; Jon Gruden – Wide receivers; Chuck Jones – Special teams/defensive line; Marvin Lewis – Outside linebackers; Skip Peete – Running backs; Nick Rapone– Secondary; Sal Sunseri – Inside linebackers	Support staff: Alex Kramer – Administrative assistant; Larry Petroff – Recruiting coordinator; Tom Gibbons – Graduate assistant; Dan Maginnis – Graduate assistant; Mike McCarthy – Graduate assistant	Strength and conditioning staff: Tim Wilson – Strength and conditioning Coach

== Team players drafted into the NFL ==
Player	Position	Round	Pick	NFL club
Sean Gilbert	Defensive tackle	1	3	Los Angeles Rams
Steve Israel	Defensive back	2	30	Los Angeles Rams
Ricardo McDonald	Linebacker	4	88	Cincinnati Bengals
Jeff Christy	Center	4	91	Phoenix Cardinals
Keith Hamilton	Defensive tackle	4	99	New York Giants
Dave Moore	Tight end	7	191	Miami Dolphins
