= Dexter Seigler =

American football player (born 1972)

No. 23, 27, 21
- Position: Cornerback

Personal information
- Born: January 11, 1972 (age 54); Miami, Florida, U.S.
- Listed height: 5 ft 9 in (1.75 m)
- Listed weight: 178 lb (81 kg)

Career information
- High school: Avon Park (Avon Park, Florida)
- College: Miami
- NFL draft: 1994: undrafted

Career history
- Miami Dolphins (1994)*; Toronto Argonauts (1994)*; Miami Dolphins (1994)*; Seattle Seahawks (1995–1997); Amsterdam Admirals (1998); Arizona Cardinals (1998)*; Amsterdam Admirals (1999)
- * Offseason or practice squad member only

Awards and highlights
- All-NFL Europe (1998); National champion (1991); Third-team All-American (1993)
- Stats at Pro Football Reference

Dexter E. Seigler (born January 11, 1972) is an American former professional football cornerback who played for the Seattle Seahawks of the National Football League (NFL). He played college football for the Miami Hurricanes.

== Early life ==
Dexter E. Seigler was born on January 11, 1972, in Miami, Florida. He attended Avon Park High School in Avon Park, Florida.

== College career ==
Seigler enrolled at the University of Miami to play college football for the Hurricanes. He was a four-year letterman from 1990 to 1993. The 1991 Hurricanes were AP poll national champions. Seigler earned Associated Press third-team All-American honors in 1993.

== Professional career ==
After going undrafted in the 1994 NFL draft, Seigler signed with the Miami Dolphins on April 28. He was released on August 19. On September 16, Seigler was signed to the practice roster of the Toronto Argonauts of the Canadian Football League. He was released on November 10. On December 15, 1994, it was reported that Seigler had been signed to the Dolphins' practice squad.

Seigler became a free agent after the 1994 season, and signed with the Seattle Seahawks on July 27, 1995. He was released on August 27 and signed to the practice squad the next day, where he spent the entire 1995 regular season. He re-signed with the Seahawks for the 1996 season. Seigler played in 12 games as a reserve cornerback in 1996, posting three solo tackles and three assisted tackles. He was released on September 3, 1997. He was re-signed on November 5, released on November 14, signed again on November 19, released again on November 21, signed on November 25, released on November 28, and signed on December 2, 1997. Overall, Seigler appeared in two games for the Seahawks as a backup during the 1997 season but did not record any statistics. He became a free agent after the 1997 season.

Seigler played for the Amsterdam Admirals during the 1998 NFL Europe season, recording 27 tackles on defense, two special teams tackles, three interceptions for 99 yards, and ten pass breakups. He earned All-NFL Europe honors.

Seigler was signed by the Arizona Cardinals on June 17, 1998. He had an impressive practice on August 1, twice intercepting second-string quarterback Stoney Case. Seigler was released on August 25, 1998.

Seigler returned to the Admirals for the 1999 NFL Europe season, totaling 21 tackles on defense, two special teams tackles, two interceptions for 52 yards, and three pass breakups.
