= 1991 West Virginia Mountaineers football team =

American college football season

1991 West Virginia Mountaineers football
- Conference: Big East Conference
- Record: 6–5 (3–4 Big East)
- Head coach: Don Nehlen (12th season)
- Home stadium: Mountaineer Field

1991 Big East Conference football standings
	Conf.					Overall
Team	W		L		T	W		L		T
No. 11 Syracuse	5	–	0	–	0	10	–	2	–	0
No. 1 Miami (FL)	2	–	0	–	0	12	–	0	–	0
Virginia Tech	1	–	0	–	0	5	–	6	–	0
Pittsburgh	3	–	2	–	0	6	–	5	–	0
West Virginia	3	–	4	–	0	6	–	5	–	0
Rutgers	2	–	3	–	0	6	–	5	–	0
Boston College	2	–	4	–	0	4	–	7	–	0
Temple	0	–	5	–	0	2	–	9	–	0
The Big East did not crown an official champion until 1993 when full league play began.; Rankings from AP Poll

The 1991 West Virginia Mountaineers football team represented West Virginia University as a member of the Big East Conference during the 1991 NCAA Division I-A football season. Led by 12th-year head coach Don Nehlen, the Mountaineers compiled an overall record of 6–5 with a mark of 3–4 in conference play. West Virginia played home games at Mountaineer Field in Morgantown, West Virginia.

== Schedule ==
Date	Time	Opponent	Site	TV	Result	Attendance	Source
August 31	7:30 p.m.	Pittsburgh	Mountaineer Field; Morgantown, WV (Backyard Brawl)	ESPN	L 3–34	68,041	
September 7	1:00 p.m.	Bowling Green*	Mountaineer Field; Morgantown, WV		W 24–17	32,597	
September 14	1:00 p.m.	South Carolina*	Mountaineer Field; Morgantown, WV		W 21–16	51,989	
September 21	4:00 p.m.	at Maryland*	Byrd Stadium; College Park, MD (rivalry)		W 37–7	40,442	
October 5	12:00 p.m.	Virginia Tech	Mountaineer Field; Morgantown, WV (rivalry)	BEN	L 14–20	57,492	
October 12	1:00 p.m.	Temple	Mountaineer Field; Morgantown, WV		W 10–9	43,767	
October 19	12:00 p.m.	at Boston College	Alumni Stadium; Chestnut Hill, MA	BEN	W 31–24	28,162	
October 26	4:00 p.m.	at No. 8 Penn State*	Beaver Stadium; University Park, PA (rivalry)	ESPN	L 6–51	96,445	
November 2	12:00 p.m.	Rutgers	Mountaineer Field; Morgantown, WV	BEN	W 28–3	38,127	
November 9	4:00 p.m.	at No. 3 Miami (FL)	Miami Orange Bowl; Miami, FL		L 3–27	60,250	
November 23	4:00 p.m.	at No. 16 Syracuse	Carrier Dome; Syracuse, NY (rivalry)	ESPN	L 10–16	45,263	
*Non-conference game; Rankings from AP Poll released prior to the game; All times are in Eastern time

== Roster ==
1991 West Virginia Mountaineers football team roster
Players
Coaches
Offense

Pos.	#	Name	Class
WR	5	Ed Hill	So
QB	14	Darren Studstill	So
WR	15	James Jett	Jr
QB	16	Chris Gray	Sr
RB	31	Carl Hayes	Jr
RB	32	Garrett Ford, Jr.	Jr
RB	33	Jon Jones	So
FB	34	Doug Costin	So
RB	42	Adrian Murrell	Jr
G, C	77	Mike Compton	Jr
OT	78	Rich Braham	So
OT	79	Joe Avila	Jr
QB	80	Al Johnson	Fr
TE	81	Darius Burwell	Jr
TE	82	John Cappa	Jr
TE	83	Keith Graley	Sr

Defense

Pos.	#	Name	Class
LB	4	Steve Grant	Sr
DB	22	Harold Kidd	Fr
DB	23	Kwame Smith	Jr
DB	24	Tommy Orr	So
DB	25	Mike Collins	So
LB	48	Steve Holmes	Fr
LB	49	Matt Ceglie	So
LB, DE	50	Mike Booth	So
LB	51	Joe Pabian, III	So
DE, LB	52	Alex Steffano	Fr
DL	52	Mark Ulmer	So
LB	54	Shannon King	So
LB	54	Matt Taffoni	Fr
LB	55	Boris Graham	Jr

Special teams

Pos.	#	Name	Class
P	21	Mike Vanderjagt	Jr

Head coach

- Don Nehlen

Coordinators/assistant coaches

Legend

- (C) Team captain
- (S) Suspended
- (I) Ineligible
- Injured
- Redshirt
