= 1991 Miami Hurricanes football team =

American college football season

1991 Miami Hurricanes football

AP poll national champion Orange Bowl champion

Orange Bowl, W 22–0 vs. Nebraska
- Conference: Big East Conference

Ranking
- Coaches: No. 2
- AP: No. 1
- Record: 12–0 (2–0 Big East)
- Head coach: Dennis Erickson (3rd season)
- Offensive coordinator: Bob Bratkowski (3rd season)
- Offensive scheme: One-back spread
- Defensive coordinator: Sonny Lubick (3rd season)
- Base defense: 4–3
- MVP: Carlos Huerta
- Home stadium: Miami Orange Bowl

1991 Big East Conference football standings
	Conf.					Overall
Team	W		L		T	W		L		T
No. 11 Syracuse	5	–	0	–	0	10	–	2	–	0
No. 1 Miami (FL)	2	–	0	–	0	12	–	0	–	0
Virginia Tech	1	–	0	–	0	5	–	6	–	0
Pittsburgh	3	–	2	–	0	6	–	5	–	0
West Virginia	3	–	4	–	0	6	–	5	–	0
Rutgers	2	–	3	–	0	6	–	5	–	0
Boston College	2	–	4	–	0	4	–	7	–	0
Temple	0	–	5	–	0	2	–	9	–	0
The Big East did not crown an official champion until 1993 when full league play began.; Rankings from AP Poll

The 1991 Miami Hurricanes football team represented the University of Miami during the 1991 NCAA Division I-A football season. It was the Hurricanes' 66th season of football and first as a member of the Big East Conference. The Hurricanes were led by third-year head coach Dennis Erickson and played their home games at the Orange Bowl. They finished the season 12–0 overall and 2–0 in the Big East while playing a partial conference schedule. They were invited to the Orange Bowl where they defeated Nebraska, 22–0. The Hurricanes were named as national champions by the AP poll, the program's fourth national championship. Washington, who also finished 12–0 overall, were named as champions by the Coaches Poll.

== Schedule ==
Date	Time	Opponent	Rank	Site	TV	Result	Attendance	Source
August 31	12:00 pm	at Arkansas*	No. 3	War Memorial Stadium; Little Rock, AR	ABC	W 31–3	46,308	
September 12	8:00 pm	No. 10 Houston*	No. 2	Miami Orange Bowl; Miami, FL	ESPN	W 40–10	71,842	
September 28	2:00 pm	at Tulsa*	No. 2	Skelly Stadium; Tulsa, OK		W 34–10	35,689	
October 5	12:00 pm	Oklahoma State*	No. 2	Miami Orange Bowl; Miami, FL		W 40–3	42,751	
October 12	12:00 pm	No. 9 Penn State*	No. 2	Miami Orange Bowl; Miami, FL	ABC	W 26–20	75,723	
October 19	4:00 pm	Long Beach State*	No. 2	Miami Orange Bowl; Miami, FL		W 55–0	40,498	
October 26	10:00 pm	at Arizona*	No. 2	Arizona Stadium; Tucson, AZ		W 36–9	53,349	
November 9	4:00 pm	West Virginia^{†}	No. 3	Miami Orange Bowl; Miami, FL		W 27–3	60,250	
November 16	12:00 pm	at No. 1 Florida State*	No. 2	Doak Campbell Stadium; Tallahassee, FL (rivalry)	ABC	W 17–16	63,442	
November 23	7:30 pm	at Boston College	No. 1	Alumni Stadium; Chestnut Hill, MA	ESPN	W 19–14	32,071	
November 30	7:30 pm	San Diego State*	No. 1	Miami Orange Bowl; Miami, FL	ESPN	W 39–12	56,721	
January 1	8:00 pm	vs. No. 11 Nebraska*	No. 1	Miami Orange Bowl; Miami, FL (Orange Bowl, rivalry)	NBC	W 22–0	77,747	
*Non-conference game; ^{†}Homecoming; Rankings from AP Poll released prior to the game; All times are in Eastern time; Source:

== Rankings ==
Ranking movements Legend: ██ Increase in ranking ██ Decrease in ranking т = Tied with team above or below ( ) = First-place votes
	Week															
Poll	Pre	1	2	3	4	5	6	7	8	9	10	11	12	13	14	Final
AP	3 (2)	3 (1)	2 (2)	2 (8)	2 (8)	2 (2)	2 (1)	2 (1)	2 (2)	2 (3)	2 т (3)	2 (3)	1 (46)	1 (37 1/2)	1 (37)	1 (32)
Coaches	2 (3)	2 (3)	2 (3)	2 (6)	2 (5)	2 (3)	2 (3)	2 (3)	2 (4)	2 (4)	2 (4)	2 (4)	1 (44)	1 (32)	2 (30)	2 (25 1/2)

== Game summaries ==
=== Arkansas ===
#3 Miami (FL) at Arkansas

Team	1	2	3	4	Total
• Hurricanes	7	7	7	10	31
Razorbacks	0	3	0	0	3

- Date: August 31
- Location: War Memorial Stadium
- Game attendance: 46,308

Scoring summary
Q1	MIA	Copeland 99 yard pass from Torretta (Huerta kick)	MIA 7–0
Q2	ARK	Wright 35 yard field goal	MIA 7–3
Q2	MIA	McGuire 11 yard run (Huerta kick)	MIA 14–3
Q3	MIA	Patton 42 yard pass from Torretta (Huerta kick)	MIA 21–3
Q4	MIA	McGuire 1 yard run (Huerta kick)	MIA 28–3
Q4	MIA	Huerta 22 yard field goal	MIA 31–3

=== Tulsa ===
#2 Miami (FL) at Tulsa

Team	1	2	3	4	Total
• Hurricanes	0	21	7	6	34
Golden Hurricane	0	3	0	7	10

- Date: September 28
- Location: Skelly Stadium
- Game attendance: 35,689

Scoring summary
Q2	MIA	McGuire 8 yard run (Huerta kick)	MIA 7–0
Q2	MIA	Etheredge 1 yard pass from Torretta (Huerta kick)	MIA 14–0
Q2	MIA	Moore 3 yard pass from Torretta (Huerta kick)	MIA 21–0
Q2	TLSA	Lange 30 yard field goal	MIA 21–3
Q3	MIA	McGuire 4 yard run (Huerta kick)	MIA 28–3
Q4	MIA	Huerta 23 yard field goal	MIA 31–3
Q4	TLSA	Fair 3 yard pass from Rubley (Lange kick)	MIA 31–10
Q4	MIA	Huerta 28 yard field goal	MIA 34–10

- Gino Torretta 20/33, 327 Yds
- Lamar Thomas 5 Rec, 106 Yds

=== Oklahoma State ===
Oklahoma State at #2 Miami (FL)

Team	1	2	3	4	Total
Cowboys	0	0	3	0	3
• Hurricanes	17	13	3	7	40

- Date: October 5
- Location: Orange Bowl
- Game attendance: 42,751

Scoring summary
Q1	MIA	McGuire 7 yard run (Huerta kick)	MIA 7–0
Q1	MIA	Huerta 27 yard field goal	MIA 10–0
Q1	MIA	Thomas 5 yard pass from Torretta (Huerta kick)	MIA 17–0
Q2	MIA	Patton 4 yard run (Huerta kick)	MIA 24–0
Q2	MIA	Patton 2 yard run (kick failed)	MIA 30–0
Q3	MIA	Huerta 29 yard field goal	MIA 33–0
Q3	OKST	Myers 20 yard field goal	MIA 33–3
Q4	MIA	Bennett 22 yard run (Huerta kick)	MIA 40–3

=== Penn State ===
#9 Penn State at #2 Miami (FL)

Team	1	2	3	4	Total
Nittany Lions	3	3	7	7	20
• Hurricanes	3	3	14	6	26

- Date: October 12
- Location: Orange Bowl
- Game attendance: 75,723
- Television network: ABC

Scoring summary
Q1		MIA	Huerta 24 yard field goal	MIA 3–0
Q1		PSU	Fayak 20 yard field goal	Tie 3–3
Q2		PSU	Fayak 46 yard field goal	PSU 6–3
Q2		MIA	Huerta 45 yard field goal	Tie 6–6
Q3	6:34	MIA	Copeland 80 yard pass from Torretta (Huerta kick)	MIA 13–6
Q3		MIA	K. Williams 91 yard punt return (Huerta kick)	MIA 20–6
Q3		PSU	T. Smith 2 yard pass from Sacca (Fayak kick)	MIA 20–13
Q4		MIA	Thomas 42 yard pass from Torretta (kick failed)	MIA 26–13
Q4		PSU	T. Smith 9 yard pass from Sacca (Fayak kick)	MIA 26–20

- First meeting between the two schools since 1987 Fiesta Bowl
- Fans watching on television outside of Florida missed two scores when the network switched to United States Supreme Court nominee Clarence Thomas testifying before the Senate Judiciary Committee
- Horace Copeland 5 Rec, 106 Yds

=== Long Beach State ===
Long Beach State at #2 Miami (FL)

Team	1	2	3	4	Total
49ers	0	0	0	0	0
• Hurricanes	7	28	7	13	55

- Date: October 19
- Location: Orange Bowl
- Game attendance: 40,498

Scoring summary
Q1	MIA	McGuire 1 yard run (Huerta kick)	MIA 7–0
Q2	MIA	Spencer 8 yard pass from Torretta (Huerta kick)	MIA 14–0
Q2	MIA	McGuire 1 yard run (Huerta kick)	MIA 21–0
Q2	MIA	K. Williams 63 yard punt return (Huerta kick)	MIA 28–0
Q2	MIA	Torretta 1 yard run (Huerta kick)	MIA 35–0
Q3	MIA	Bennett 2 yard run (Huerta kick)	MIA 42–0
Q4	MIA	L. Jones 30 yard run (Huerta kick)	MIA 49–0
Q4	MIA	Marucci 5 yard run (kick failed)	MIA 55–0

=== Florida State ===
#2 Miami (FL) at #1 Florida State

Team	1	2	3	4	Total
• Hurricanes	7	0	0	10	17
Seminoles	3	7	3	3	16

- Date: November 16
- Location: Doak Campbell Stadium, Tallahassee, FL
- Game start: 12:00 p.m. EST
- Game attendance: 63,442
- TV announcers (ABC): Keith Jackson and Bob Griese

Scoring summary
1		MIA	Stephen McGuire 2-yard run (Huerta kick)	MIA 7-0
1		FSU	Gerry Thomas 25-yard field goal	MIA 7-3
2		FSU	Paul Moore 1-yard run (Thomas kick)	FSU 10-7
3		FSU	Gerry Thomas 31-yard field goal	FSU 13-7
4		FSU	Gerry Thomas 20-yard field goal	FSU 16-7
4	9:48	MIA	Carlos Huerta 45-yard field goal	FSU 16-10
4	3:01	MIA	Larry Jones 1-yard run (Huerta kick)	MIA 17-16

=== Vs. Nebraska (Orange Bowl) ===
#1 Miami (FL) vs. #11 Nebraska

Team	1	2	3	4	Total
• Hurricanes	13	0	9	0	22
Cornhuskers	0	0	0	0	0

- Date: January 1
- Location: Orange Bowl, Miami, Florida
- Game attendance: 77,747
- Referee: Ron Winter (Big Ten)
- Television network: NBC

== Personnel ==
=== Coaching staff ===
Name	Position	Seasons	Alma mater
Dennis Erickson	Head coach	3rd	Montana State (1969)
Bob Bratkowski	Offensive coordinator/wide receivers	3rd	Washington State (1978)
Sonny Lubick	Defensive coordinator/defensive backs	3rd	Western Montana (1960)
Gregg Smith	Offensive line	3rd	Idaho (1969)
Dave Arnold	Special Teams/tight ends	3rd	
Bob Karmelowicz	Defensive line	3rd	Bridgeport (1972)
Art Kehoe	Assistant offensive line	7th	Miami (1982)
Ed Orgeron	Defensive line	3rd	Northwestern State (1984)
Tommy Tuberville	Linebackers	3rd	Southern Arkansas (1976)
Alex Wood	Running backs	3rd	Iowa (1978)

=== Roster ===
1991 Miami Hurricanes football team roster
Players
Coaches
Offense

Pos.	#	Name	Class
WR	37	Doyle Aaron	Sr
G	60	Rudy Barber	So
TE	17	Coleman Bell	Jr
FB	33	Donnell Bennett	Fr
G	69	Jason Budroni	So
WR	12	Bobby Byrd	Sr
OL	75	Candido Cerda	So
QB	20	Ryan Collins	Fr
WR	88	Horace Copeland	Jr
QB	11	Frank Costa	Fr
OT	72	Mario Cristobal	Jr
TE	82	Carlos Etheredge	Jr
QB	9	Bryan Fortay	So
G	52	Marty Golloher	Sr
C	51	Tirrell Greene	Fr
QB	7	Alan Hall	Fr
RB	40	Derrick Harris	Fr
TB	3	Jonathan Harris	Fr
C	54	Kelvin Harris	Sr
WR	85	Chris Jones	Fr
G	70	Claude Jones	Sr
FB	44	Larry Jones	Fr
TE	87	Kevin Kirkeide	Jr
G	64	Anthony Lewis	Fr
OT	77	Zev Lumelski	Fr
FB	22	Jason Marucci	So
RB	30	Stephen McGuire	Jr
TE	90	Joe Moore	Sr
OL	75	Jason Owens	Fr
FB	32	Martin Patton	So
RB	33	Russell Sapp	Sr
TE	84	Warren Sapp	Fr
OT	73	Leon Searcy	Sr
WR	24	Todd Seiple	Sr
G	68	Brad Shirey	So
WR	35	Darryl Spencer	Jr
RB	28	James Stewart	Fr
OT	62	Kyle Stranahan	So
WR	18	A. C. Tellison	Fr
WR	36	Lamar Thomas	Jr
QB	13	Gino Torretta	Jr
TE	81	Syii Tucker	Fr
G	78	Kipp Vickers	Jr
WR	5	Kevin Williams	So
OL	65	Robert Woodus	Fr

Defense

Pos.	#	Name	Class
DL	67	Omar Andres	Fr
LB	1	Jessie Armstead	Jr
LB	56	Michael Barrow	Jr
LB	49	Robert Bass	Jr
DT	46	Damon Bethel	So
LB	57	Kevin Brinkworth	Fr
LB	99	Matt Britton	Sr
S	8	Hurlie Brown	Sr
DT	76	Mark Caesar	Jr
S	48	Marcus Carey	So
LB	83	Dietrich Clausell	Fr
LB	59	Travis Cooper	Fr
LB	61	Bruce Eberst	Jr
LB	58	Corwin Francis	Fr
LB	80	Derrick Golden	Sr
S	29	Casey Greer	Jr
DE	97	Anthony Hamlet	Sr
LB	57	Corries Hardy	Fr
S	6	Terris Harris	So
DE	92	David Holliman	Fr
CB	26	Herbert James	Sr
DT	94	Dwayne Johnson	Fr
DL	93	Shawn Jones	Fr
DE	91	Darren Krein	So
DT	71	Kenny Lopez	So
DB	37	Rohan Marley	Fr
CB	47	Ryan McNeil	Jr
DE	98	Rusty Medearis	So
DL	63	George Michaels	Jr
DT	95	Eric Miller	Sr
DL	79	Jessie Mitchell	Fr
DE	86	Kevin Patrick	So
LB	59	Tom Patterson	So
SS	38	Malcolm Pearson	Fr
S	2	Charles Pharms	Sr
LB	55	Willie Phillips	Fr
FS	19	C. J. Richardson	Fr
DL	41	Patrick Riley	Fr
CB	34	Dexter Seigler	So
DE	50	Baraka Short	Fr
LB	45	Darrin Smith	Jr
CB	43	Jean Stiverne	Jr
DL	66	Alan Symonette	Fr
LB	53	Sean Thompson	Jr
DL	74	Shayon Tresvant	Fr
OL	78	Kipp Vickers	Jr
CB	4	Paul White	So
DB	31	Darryl Williams	Jr

Special teams

Pos.	#	Name	Class
P	24	David Dziczkowski	Jr
K	27	Carlos Huerta	Sr
K	21	Dane Prewitt	So
K	37	Dan Levine	So
P	15	Paul Snyder	Jr

Head coach

- Dennis Erickson

Coordinators/assistant coaches

Legend

- (C) Team captain
- (S) Suspended
- (I) Ineligible
- Injured
- Redshirt

Roster

=== Depth chart ===
Defense

FS
Charles Pharms
Teris Harris
Marcus Carey

MIKE	WILL	SAM
Jessie Armstead; Sean Thompson	Michael Barrow	Robert Bass; Derrick Golden
Willie Phillips	Darrin Smith	Corries Hardy
Bruce Eberst	Kevin Brinkworth	Corwin Francis

ROVER
Hurlie Brown
Casey Greer
Malcolm Pearson

CB
Ryan McNeil
Paul White
Dexter Seigler

DE	DT	DT	DE
Rusty Medearis	Mark Ceasar	Eric Miller	Anthony Hamlet
Kevin Patrick	Warren Sapp	Patrick Riley	Darrin Krein
Damon Bethel	Kenny Lopez	Warren Sapp	Damon Bethel

CB
Darryl Williams
Herbert James
Jean Stiverne

Offense

WR
Lamar Thomas
Kevin Williams
Chris Jones

WR
Darryl Spencer
A.C Tellison
Doyle Aaron

LT	LG	C	RG	RT
Mario Cristobal	Kipp Vickers	Kelvin Harris	Brad Shirey	Leon Searcy
Kyle Stranahan	Rudy Barber	Tirrell Greene	Jason Budroni	Robert Woodus
Zev Lumelski	Marty Golloher	Candido Cerda	Anthony Lewis	Jason Owens

TE
Coleman Bell
Joe Moore
Carlos Etheredge
Kevin Kirkeide

WR
Horace Copeland
Bobby Byrd
Johnathan Harris

QB
Gino Torreta
Frank Costa
Bryan Fortay

Special teams
PK Carlos Huerta
P Paul Snyder

RB
Stephen McGuire
Larry Jones
Russell Sapp
Donnell Bennett

== Awards and honors ==
=== First Team All-Americans ===
- Leon Searcy, T
- Darrin Smith, LB
- Darryl Williams, FS
- Kevin Williams, KR/PR
- Carlos Huerta, K

=== Conference awards ===
- Darrin Smith, LB: Big East Co-Defensive Player of the Year
- Gino Torretta, QB: Big East Offensive Player of the Year
- Kevin Williams, KR/PR: Big East Special Teams Player of the Year

• Russell Sapp, RB/KR/PR: Big East Co-Special Teams Player of the Year

=== Jack Harding University of Miami MVP Award ===
- Carlos Huerta, K

== 1992 NFL draft ==
Player	Position	Round	Pick	Team
Leon Searcy	Tackle	1	11	Pittsburgh Steelers
Darryl Williams	Defensive Back	1	28	Cincinnati Bengals
Craig Erickson	Quarterback	4	86	Tampa Bay Buccaneers
Anthony Hamlet	Defensive end	10	263	Seattle Seahawks
Kelvin Harris	Center	12	312	Los Angeles Rams
Carlos Huerta	Kicker	12	315	San Diego Chargers
