= Charles Swann (American football) =

American football player (born 1970)

No. 25, 26
- Position: Wide receiver

Personal information
- Born: October 29, 1970 (age 56); Memphis, Tennessee, U.S.
- Listed height: 6 ft 1 in (1.85 m)
- Listed weight: 188 lb (85 kg)

Career information
- High school: La Salle (South Bend, Indiana)
- College: Indiana State (1988–1991)
- NFL draft: 1992: 12th round, 323rd overall pick

Career history
- New York Giants (1992)*; Denver Broncos (1994); Carolina Panthers (1995)*; Green Bay Packers (1995)*; Orlando Predators (1997); Scottish Claymores (1997–1998)
- * Offseason or practice squad member only

Career NFL statistics
- Return yards: 16
- Stats at Pro Football Reference

Charles Derek Swann (born October 29, 1970) is an American former professional football player who was a wide receiver for the Denver Broncos of the National Football League (NFL). He played college football for the Indiana State Sycamores.
