= Brian Allred =

American football player (born 1969)

No. 39
- Position: Cornerback

Personal information
- Born: March 16, 1969 (age 57); Washington, D.C., U.S.
- Listed height: 5 ft 10 in (1.78 m)
- Listed weight: 175 lb (79 kg)

Career information
- High school: Hammond, MD
- College: Sacramento State
- NFL draft: 1992: undrafted

Career history
- New York Giants (1992–1993)*; Seattle Seahawks (1993-1994); San Diego Chargers (1995)*; San Jose SaberCats (1996)
- * Offseason or practice squad member only

Career AFL statistics
- Tackles: 38
- Passes defended: 11
- Interceptions: 5
- Total touchdowns: 5
- Stats at ArenaFan.com
- Stats at Pro Football Reference

Brian McCray Allred (born March 16, 1969) is an American former professional football cornerback who played for the Seattle Seahawks of the National Football League (NFL). He played college football at Sacramento State University.
