= Marc Boutte =

American football player (1969–2025)

No. 96, 93
- Position: Defensive tackle

Personal information
- Born: July 25, 1969; Lake Charles, Louisiana, U.S.
- Died: March 2, 2025 (aged 55)
- Listed height: 6 ft 4 in (1.93 m)
- Listed weight: 307 lb (139 kg)

Career information
- High school: Lake Charles-Boston
- College: LSU
- NFL draft: 1992: 3rd round, 57th overall pick

Career history
- Los Angeles Rams (1992–1993); Washington Redskins (1994–1999)

Awards and highlights
- First-team All-SEC (1990); Second-team All-SEC (1991)

Career NFL statistics
- Tackles: 191
- Forced fumbles: 8
- Sacks: 9
- Stats at Pro Football Reference

Marc Anthony Boutte (July 25, 1969 – March 2, 2025) was an American professional football player who was a defensive tackle in the National Football League (NFL) for the Washington Redskins and Los Angeles Rams. He played college football for the LSU Tigers and was selected in the third round of the 1992 NFL draft. In 109 career games with the Rams and Redskins, Boutte had eight forced fumbles and nine quarterback sacks. He also had two career interceptions; unusually, both came from left-handed quarterbacks (Boomer Esiason in 1996 and Mark Brunell in 1997).

== Early life ==
As a senior defensive tackle at Lake Charles-Boston High School in Lake Charles, Boutte was a first-team Class AAA All-State selection with 69 tackles and two interceptions for the Cougars. Boutte was also named to the Baton Rouge Advocate's Super Dozen list that season.

== College career ==
Under head coaches Mike Archer and later Curley Hallman at Louisiana State University, Boutte was a three-year starter at defensive tackle and nose tackle earning First Team All-SEC honors by UPI in 1990 and Second-Team All-SEC by the Associated Press in both 1990 and 1991.

== Professional career ==
=== Los Angeles Rams (1992–1993) ===
Boutte was drafted by the Los Angeles Rams in the third round of the 1992 NFL draft, three selections ahead of LSU teammate Todd Kinchen who was also picked by the Rams. Boutte started all but one game in his two seasons with the Rams under head coach Chuck Knox, making 71 tackles and two quarterback sacks while forcing four fumbles.

Boutte suffered a knee injury in training camp entering the 1994 season which hampered his play-making ability and he was subsequently cut by the Rams the following month.

=== Washington Redskins (1994–1999) ===
Boutte was picked up off of waivers by the Washington Redskins shortly before Washington's 1994 season-opener with the Seattle Seahawks to help shore up a depleted defensive line that was one of the worst in the league in 1993.

By 1995, Boutte had earned a starting defensive tackle job after oft-injured Bobby Wilson suffered a career-ending back injury in training camp. That season turned into Boutte's best as a professional. He started all 16 games for Washington, making 42 tackles and two sacks and recovering a fumble.

Over the next three seasons, Boutte was a near-constant presence in the Washington defensive line as both a starter and reserve, playing in 39 games while making 66 tackles, four sacks and two interceptions. He scored his only career NFL points in 1998 in Washington's Week 13 victory over the Oakland Raiders when he tackled Raiders quarterback Donald Hollas in the end zone for a safety.

By 1999, injuries began to take their toll and Boutte fell from the starting job, to backup, to unused reserve. After a Washington win over the Chicago Bears on Halloween, Boutte was held out of the next eight games and did not play again until Washington's regular-season finale against the Miami Dolphins. Though he would make a tackle for loss and sack Dolphins' quarterback Damon Huard, it would turn out to be Boutte's final game in the NFL. He would not play in either of Washington's playoff games that postseason, and would leave as an unrestricted free agent at the end of the season.

== Personal life and death ==
On September 29, 1998, Boutte, his wife, and a family friend were nearly killed when a man committed suicide by leaving his car running in the garage below the player's apartment in Herndon, Virginia. Though the carbon monoxide fumes sickened the Bouttes, they were able to drive themselves to the hospital where they were treated and released.

Boutte died on March 2, 2025, at the age of 55.
