= Brad Culpepper =

American football player (born 1969)

No. 77, 73, 76
- Position: Defensive tackle

Personal information
- Born: May 8, 1969 (age 57); Tallahassee, Florida, U.S.
- Listed height: 6 ft 1 in (1.85 m)
- Listed weight: 280 lb (127 kg)

Career information
- High school: Leon (Tallahassee)
- College: Florida
- NFL draft: 1992: 10th round, 264th overall pick

Career history
- Minnesota Vikings (1992–1993); Tampa Bay Buccaneers (1994–1999); Chicago Bears (2000)

Awards and highlights
- Draddy Trophy (1991); Consensus All-American (1991); First-team All-SEC (1991); Second-team All-SEC (1990); University of Florida Athletic Hall of Fame

Career NFL statistics
- Games played: 131
- Games started: 83
- Tackles: 316
- Sacks: 34.0
- Forced fumbles: 6
- Stats at Pro Football Reference

John Broward "Brad" Culpepper (born May 8, 1969) is an American former professional football player who was a defensive tackle in the National Football League (NFL) from 1992 to 2000. Culpepper was as an All-American when he played college football for the Florida Gators. Selected late in the tenth round of the 1992 NFL draft, he became a consistent starter for the Minnesota Vikings, Tampa Bay Buccaneers, and Chicago Bears.

Culpepper is also known for appearing on two seasons of the American reality television show Survivor, appearing on Survivor: Blood vs. Water (with his wife, Monica, of Survivor: One World) and Survivor: Game Changers.

== Early life ==
Culpepper was born in Tallahassee, Florida in 1969. He attended Leon High School in Tallahassee, where he was a standout prep player for the Leon Lions high school football team.

Culpepper was born into a family of University of Florida alumni. His father, Bruce Culpepper, was a center for the Gators football team from 1960 to 1962 and co-captain of their 1962 Gator Bowl team, and became a prominent Tallahassee attorney. His uncle, Blair Culpepper, was a Gators fullback in 1957 and 1958, and became a bank president in Winter Park, Florida. His grandfather, J. Broward Culpepper, was also a Florida graduate and served as the chancellor of the State University System of Florida.

== College career ==
Culpepper accepted an athletic scholarship to attend the University of Florida in Gainesville, Florida, where he played for coach Galen Hall and coach Steve Spurrier's Gators teams from 1988 to 1991. During his senior season in 1991, Culpepper was a standout defensive tackle and team captain on the Gators' Southeastern Conference (SEC) championship team, a first-team All-SEC selection and a consensus first-team All-American. He finished his college career with eighteen quarterback sacks and 47.5 tackles for a loss. He was also named to the SEC Academic Honor Roll all four years, was a first-team Academic All-American, and received the Draddy Trophy recognizing him as college football's most outstanding student-athlete. While Culpepper was a Florida undergraduate, he was also an active member of Sigma Chi fraternity (Gamma Theta chapter).

Culpepper graduated from Florida with his bachelor's degree in history after his junior year, and enrolled in a master's degree program in exercise and sports sciences during his senior football season. He was inducted into the University of Florida Athletic Hall of Fame as a "Gator Great" in 2001. The sports editors of The Gainesville Sun ranked him as the No. 47 all-time greatest player of the first 100 seasons of the Florida Gators football team in 2006.

== Professional career ==
Culpepper was a tenth round selection (264th overall pick) in the 1992 NFL draft by the Minnesota Vikings, and he played for the Vikings from 1992 to 1993, the Tampa Bay Buccaneers from 1994 to 1999, and the Chicago Bears in 2000. In his nine-year professional career, Culpepper played in 131 games, started 83 of them, and recorded 34 quarterback sacks and one safety.

== Life after football ==
After finishing his professional playing career, Culpepper returned to graduate school and law school full-time, and earned his master's degree and J.D. degree from Florida in 2001.

Culpepper is now a trial lawyer for the Culpepper Kurland law firm in Tampa, Florida. Since his retirement, he has spoken out about his concerns regarding the increasing size of NFL players; he believes that the increasing number of 300-pound (140 kg) players is "unnatural and unsafe" and has led to many serious health problems. During his football career, Culpepper inflated his weight to 280 pounds (130 kg); after he retired from professional football, he lost almost 100 pounds (45 kg).

=== Survivor ===
==== Blood vs. Water ====
Prior to his appearances, Culpepper's wife Monica was selected as a participant for Survivor: One World, the twenty-fourth season of the CBS reality television show Survivor.

Monica and Brad participated together in the series's twenty-seventh season, Survivor: Blood vs. Water. Culpepper was the sixth person eliminated from the game and came in fifteenth place, while Monica was the season's runner-up.

On May 6, 2015, it was revealed that Culpepper was one of sixteenth former male players eligible to be voted onto Survivor's 31st season, Survivor: Cambodia. However, he was not voted onto it.

==== Game Changers ====
On February 8, 2017, Culpepper was revealed to be one of the contestants competing in Survivor: Game Changers, the show's 34th season, which began airing in March 2017. Throughout Culpepper's second season, he played relatively consistently, and stayed loyal to his alliances, despite being in the minority for the most part. However, at his endgame, he won five individual immunity challenges; a feat shared only by a few other elite Survivor players, which propelled him to the Final Three with Sarah Lacina and "Troyzan" Robertson. Although Culpepper played a solid social game and was a prominent threat, he became very arrogant and made some remarks toward fellow tribe mate Tai Trang that other players perceived as condescending in the last few days. Fellow tribemate Aubry Bracco in her jury speaks video controversially said she had hesitations about voting for Brad to win because of his "racist and sexist tendencies". At the Final Tribal Council, Lacina's skillful strategic and social gameplay was preferred by the jury over Culpepper's physical dominance, and she was awarded the title of "Sole Survivor" in a 7–3–0 vote. Culpepper received three votes, making him the runner-up.

== Personal life ==
In 1990, Culpepper met Monica Frakes when he was a sophomore at the University of Florida. The couple married weeks after Culpepper was drafted into the NFL in 1992. The couple have three children together. Their oldest son, Rex, was a quarterback at Syracuse University, and their other son, Judge, was a defensive lineman at the University of Toledo. Rex passed away on March 15, 2026, due to injuries sustained from a dirt bike accident, at the age of 28.

He and his wife, Monica, are the only Survivor couple to both be runners-up in separate seasons. Coincidentally, they both achieved this feat in their second time playing the game, Monica in Survivor: Blood vs. Water and Brad in Survivor: Game Changers, after being voted out pre-merge in their debut seasons.

== See also ==
- History of the Tampa Bay Buccaneers
- List of Chicago Bears players
- List of Florida Gators football All-Americans
- List of Florida Gators in the NFL draft
- List of Levin College of Law graduates
- List of Sigma Chi members
- List of University of Florida alumni

Preceded by Ken McNickle & Hannah Sharpio	Runner-Up of Survivor; Survivor: Game Changers	Succeeded by Chrissy Hofbeck
