= 1990 All-SEC football team =

American college football all-star team

The 1990 All-SEC football team consists of American football players selected to the All-Southeastern Conference (SEC) chosen by various selectors for the 1990 NCAA Division I-A football season. The Florida Gators posted the best conference record, but were ineligible for an SEC title due to NCAA probation. Thus the Tennessee Volunteers won the conference. Florida quarterback Shane Matthews was voted SEC Player of the Year.

== Offensive selections ==
=== Receivers ===
- Carl Pickens, Tennessee (C, AP-1, UPI)
- Todd Kinchen, LSU (C, AP-1)
- Ernie Mills, Florida (AP-2, UPI)
- Alvin Harper, Tennessee (AP-2)

=== Tight ends ===
- Kirk Kirkpatrick, Florida (C, AP-1)
- Rodney Jackson, Kentucky (AP-2)
- Lamonde Russell, Alabama (AP-2)

=== Tackles ===
- Antone Davis, Tennessee (C, AP-1, UPI)
- Terrill Chatman, Alabama (C, AP-2, UPI)
- Rob Selby, Auburn (C, AP-1)
- Charles McRae, Tennessee (C, AP-2)
- Cal Dixon, Florida (UPI)

=== Guards ===
- Ed King, Auburn (C, AP-1, UPI)
- Ricky Byrd, Miss. St. (AP-1)
- Chris Bromley, Florida (AP-2)
- Joel Mazzella, Kentucky (AP-2)

=== Centers ===
- Roger Shultz, Alabama (C, AP-1, UPI)
- Blake Miller, LSU (C, AP-2)
- Kevin Brothen, Vanderbilt (AP-2)

=== Quarterbacks ===
- Shane Matthews, Florida (C, AP-1, UPI)
- Andy Kelly, Tennessee (AP-2)

=== Running backs ===
- Tony Thompson, Tennessee (C, AP-1, UPI)
- Randy Baldwin, Ole Miss (C, AP-1, UPI)
- Harvey Williams, LSU (AP-2, UPI)
- Al Baker, Kentucky (AP-2)

== Defensive selections ==
=== Defensive linemen ===
- George Thornton, Alabama (C, AP-1, UPI)
- David Rocker, Auburn (C, AP-1, UPI)
- Kelvin Pritchett, Ole Miss (C, AP-1)
- Marc Boutte, LSU (AP-2, UPI)
- Mark Murray, Florida (AP-2)
- Rod Keith, Vanderbilt (AP-2)
- Robert Stewart, Alabama (AP-2)
- Brad Culpepper, Florida (AP-2)
- Walter Tate, Auburn (AP-2)

=== Linebackers ===
- Huey Richardson, Florida (C, AP-1 [as DL], UPI)
- John Sullins, Alabama (C, AP-1, UPI)
- Randy Holleran, Kentucky (C, AP-1)
- Godfrey Myles, Florida (C, AP-2)
- Tim Paulk, Florida (AP-2, UPI)
- Reggie Stewart, Miss. St. (AP-1)
- Mo Lewis, Georgia (AP-2)
- Earnest Fields, Tennessee (AP-2)

=== Backs ===
- Will White, Florida (C, AP-1, UPI)
- Dale Carter, Tennessee (C, AP-1, UPI)
- Efrum Thomas, Alabama (C, AP-1, UPI)
- Richard Fain, Florida (C, AP-1)
- John Wiley, Auburn (AP-2, UPI)
- Chris Mitchell, Ole Miss (AP-1)
- Corey Barlow, Auburn (AP-2)
- Derriel McCorvey, LSU (AP-2)

== Special teams ==
=== Kicker ===
- Philip Doyle, Alabama (C, AP-1, UPI)
- John Kasay, Georgia (AP-2)

=== Punter ===
- David Lawrence, Vanderbilt (C, AP-1)
- Joey Chapman, Tennessee (UPI)
- Mike Riley, Miss. St. (AP-2)

== Key ==
C = selected by coaches of the conference

AP = Associated Press

UPI = United Press International

Bold = Consensus first-team selection by Coaches, AP, and UPI

== See also ==
- 1990 College Football All-America Team
