= 1991 All-SEC football team =

Team of American-football players from the southern United States

The 1991 All-SEC football team consists of American football players selected to the All-Southeastern Conference (SEC) chosen by various selectors for the 1991 college football season.

The Florida Gators won the conference, posting an undefeated conference record. Florida quarterback Shane Matthews repeated as SEC Player of the Year.

== Offensive selections ==
=== Quarterbacks ===
- Shane Matthews, Florida (AP-1, Coaches-1)
- Andy Kelly, Tennessee (AP-2)

=== Running backs ===
- Corey Harris, Vanderbilt (AP-1, Coaches-1)
- Errict Rhett, Florida (AP-1)
- Siran Stacy, Alabama (AP-2, Coaches-1)
- Garrison Hearst, Georgia (AP-2)

=== Wide receivers ===
- Carl Pickens, Tennessee (AP-1, Coaches-1)
- Todd Kinchen, LSU (AP-1, Coaches-1)
- Willie Jackson, Florida (AP-2)
- Andre Hastings, Georgia (AP-2)

=== Centers ===
- Cal Dixon, Florida (AP-1, Coaches-1)
- Kevin Brothen, Vanderbilt (AP-2)

=== Guards ===
- Tom Myslinski, Tennessee (AP-1, Coaches-1)
- Hesham Ismail, Florida (AP-1, Coaches-1)
- Everett Lindsay, Ole Miss (AP-2)
- Bob Meeks, Auburn (AP-2)
- Mark White, Florida (AP-2)

=== Tackles ===
- John James, Miss. St. (AP-1, Coaches-1)
- Kevin Mawae, LSU (AP-1, Coaches-1)
- Eddie Blake, Auburn (AP-2, Coaches-1)

=== Tight ends ===
- Tyji Armstrong, Ole Miss (AP-1)
- Victor Hall, Auburn (Coaches-1)
- Pat Akos, Vanderbilt (AP-2)

== Defensive selections ==
=== Ends ===
- Chuck Smith, Tennessee (AP-1)
- Chris Mims, Tennessee (AP-1)
- Nate Williams, Miss. St. (AP-2, Coaches-1)
- John Copeland, Alabama (AP-2)
- Eric Curry, Alabama (AP-2)

=== Tackles ===
- Brad Culpepper, Florida (AP-1, Coaches-1)
- Tony McCoy, Florida (AP-1)
- Marc Boutte, LSU (AP-2)
- Joey Couch, Kentucky (AP-2)

=== Middle guards ===
- Robert Stewart, Alabama (AP-1, Coaches-1)

=== Linebackers ===
- Dwayne Simmons, Georgia (AP-1, Coaches-1)
- Tim Paulk, Florida (AP-1, Coaches-1)
- John Sullins, Alabama (AP-1)
- Keo Coleman, Miss. St. (AP-1)
- Ephesians Bartley, Florida (AP-2, Coaches-1)
- Darryl Hardy, Tennessee (AP-2, Coaches-1)
- Daniel Boyd, Miss. St. (AP-2)
- Darrel Crawford, Auburn (AP-2)

=== Backs ===
- Dale Carter, Tennessee (AP-1, Coaches-1)
- Will White, Florida (AP-1, Coaches-1)
- Corey Barlow, Auburn (AP-1, Coaches-1)
- Jeremy Lincoln, Tennessee (Coaches-1)
- Antonio Langham, Alabama (AP-2)
- Chuck Carswell, Georgia (AP-2)
- George Teague, Alabama (AP-2)

== Special teams ==
=== Kicker ===
- Doug Pelfrey, Kentucky (AP-1)
- Arden Czyzewski, Florida (AP-2, Coaches-1)

=== Punter ===
- Shayne Edge, Florida (AP-1, Coaches-1)
- David Lawrence, Vanderbilt (AP-2)

== Key ==
AP = Associated Press

Coaches = selected by the SEC coaches

Bold = Consensus first-team selection by both AP and Coaches

== See also ==
- 1991 College Football All-America Team
