= Cal Dixon =

American football player (born 1969)

No. 52, 63, 57
- Positions: Center, guard

Personal information
- Born: October 11, 1969 (age 57); Fort Lauderdale, Florida, U.S.
- Listed height: 6 ft 4 in (1.93 m)
- Listed weight: 302 lb (137 kg)

Career information
- High school: Merritt Island (Merritt Island, Florida)
- College: Florida
- NFL draft: 1992: 5th round, 127th overall pick

Career history
- New York Jets (1992–1995); Miami Dolphins (1996); Orlando Rage (2001); Orlando Predators (2001)

Awards and highlights
- Second-team All-American (1991); Jacobs Blocking Trophy (1991); 2× First-team All-SEC (1990, 1991)

Career NFL statistics
- Games played: 66
- Games started: 12
- Fumble recoveries: 1
- Stats at Pro Football Reference
- Stats at ArenaFan.com

Calvert Ray Dixon, III (born October 11, 1969) is an American former professional football player who was an offensive lineman for five seasons in the National Football League (NFL) during the 1990s. Dixon played college football for the Florida Gators, and thereafter, he played professionally for the New York Jets and the Miami Dolphins of the NFL.

== Early life ==
Dixon was born in Fort Lauderdale, Florida, in 1969. He attended Merritt Island High School in Merritt Island, Florida, and played high school football for the Merritt Island Mustangs.

== College career ==
Dixon accepted an athletic scholarship to attend the University of Florida in Gainesville, Florida, where he played center for coach Galen Hall and coach Steve Spurrier's Gators teams from 1988 to 1991. As a senior in 1991, Dixon was a team captain and a member of the Gators' first Southeastern Conference (SEC) championship squad. He was a first-team All-SEC selection in 1990 and 1991, an Associated Press second-team All-American, the winner of the SEC's Jacobs Blocking Trophy, and the recipient of the Gators' Fergie Ferguson Award in 1991. He was also recognized as an SEC Academic Honor Roll honoree all four years and a member of the College Football Association's Scholar-Athlete Team in 1991.

== Professional career ==
The New York Jets selected Dixon in the fifth round (127th pick overall) of the 1992 NFL draft. He was a center and guard for the Jets from 1992 to 1995. He played in sixty-six NFL games, starting in twelve of them. Dixon finished his NFL career with the Miami Dolphins in 1996. Dixon was signed by the Orlando Predators in 2002.

== See also ==
- Florida Gators football, 1990–99
- List of Florida Gators football All-Americans
- List of Florida Gators in the NFL draft
- List of Miami Dolphins players
- List of New York Jets players
- List of SEC Jacobs Blocking Trophy winners
- List of University of Florida alumni
