= John Sullins (American football) =

American football player (born 1969)

No. 50
- Position: Linebacker

Personal information
- Born: September 7, 1969 (age 57); Sulligent, Alabama, U.S.
- Listed height: 6 ft 1 in (1.85 m)
- Listed weight: 225 lb (102 kg)

Career information
- High school: Oxford (MS) Lafayette
- College: Alabama
- NFL draft: 1992: undrafted

Career history
- Denver Broncos (1992)

Awards and highlights
- 2× First-team All-SEC (1990, 1991)
- Stats at Pro Football Reference

John Sullins (born September 7, 1969) is an American former football linebacker. He played for the Denver Broncos in 1992.
