= Corey Barlow =

American football player and coach (born 1970)

Clark Atlanta Panthers
- Title: Defensive coordinator & safeties coach

Personal information
- Born: November 1, 1970 (age 56); Atlanta, Georgia, U.S.
- Listed height: 5 ft 9 in (1.75 m)
- Listed weight: 182 lb (83 kg)

Career information
- Position: Defensive back (No. 24)
- College: Auburn
- NFL draft: 1992: 5th round, 129th overall pick

Career history

Playing
- Philadelphia Eagles (1992–1994); Amsterdam Admirals (1996); Nashville Kats (1999); Grand Rapids Rampage (1999)

Coaching
- Southside HS (2000–2001) Defensive backs coach; Morehouse (2002–2005) Defensive backs coach; Rhode Island (2006) Defensive backs coach; UAB (2007–2011) Cornerbacks coach; Savannah State (2012) Cornerbacks coach; Savannah State (2013–2014) Defensive coordinator & defensive backs coach; Faulkner (2018) Defensive coordinator & defensive backs coach; Southwest Mississippi CC (2019–2020) Defensive coordinator; South Carolina State (2021–2023) Cornerbacks coach; Alabama A&M (2024) Cornerbacks coach; Fort Valley State (2025) Defensive coordinator; Clark Atlanta (2026–present) Defensive coordinator & safeties coach

Awards and highlights
- First-team All-SEC (1991); Second-team All-SEC (1990); Auburn All-1990s decade team

Career NFL statistics
- Fumble recoveries: 1
- Stats at Pro Football Reference

Corey Antonio Barlow (born November 1, 1970) is an American college football coach and former professional player who was a defensive back for three seasons in the National Football League (NFL), one season in the World League of American Football (WLAF), and one season in the Arena Football League (AFL). He is the defensive coordinator and safeties coach for Clark Atlanta University, positions he has held since 2026. He was selected by the Philadelphia Eagles in the fifth round of the 1992 NFL draft after playing college football for the Auburn Tigers.

== Professional career ==
Barlow was selected by the Philadelphia Eagles in the fifth round of the 1992 NFL draft (129th overall), but did not play in a game for the team during his rookie season. He played in 10 games for the team in 1993. Barlow re-signed with the Philadelphia Eagles on a one-year contract on June 21, 1994, before suffering a torn anterior cruciate ligament in his left knee. He was subsequently placed on injured reserve on August 27, ending his season. He was selected by the Amsterdam Admirals in the 18th round of the 1996 WLAF Draft (109th overall) and played for the team in 1996. He played for one season in the Arena Football League in 1999, for the Nashville Kats and the Grand Rapids Rampage.

== Coaching career ==
After his playing career ended, Barlow was an assistant football and track & field coach at Southside High School in Atlanta, Georgia from 2000–2001. He was the football operations manager and defensive backs coach at Morehouse College from 2002–2005, and he was hired by Rhode Island as the team's secondary coach on March 30, 2006. UAB hired Barlow as the team's cornerbacks coach on December 23, 2006. He was hired by Savannah State as the team's cornerbacks coach in 2012. Savannah State head coach Steve Davenport was fired on April 17, 2013, and Barlow was named interim head coach.
