= Mark Murray (American football) =

American football player (born 1967)

No. 57
- Position: Linebacker

Personal information
- Born: October 15, 1967 (age 59); Orlando, Florida, U.S.
- Listed height: 6 ft 2 in (1.88 m)
- Listed weight: 240 lb (109 kg)

Career information
- High school: Apopka (Apopka, Florida)
- College: Florida (1986–1990)
- NFL draft: 1991: undrafted

Career history
- Denver Broncos (1991–1992)

Awards and highlights
- Second-team All-SEC (1990)

Career NFL statistics
- Games played: 6
- Stats at Pro Football Reference

Mark Allen Murray (born October 15, 1967) is an American former professional football linebacker who played for the Denver Broncos of the National Football League (NFL). He played college football for the Florida Gators.

== Early life ==
Murray was born on October 15, 1967, in Orlando, Florida. He attended Apopka High School in Apopka, Florida. As a senior, Murray had 100 tackles and four interceptions. On February 12, 1986, he committed to play college football at the University of Florida.

== College career ==
Murray played college football for the Florida Gators from 1986 to 1990 and was a four-year letterman from 1987 to 1990. After he redshirted his first season, he played at both linebacker and on the defensive line in his four-year playing career with 5.5 sacks in his senior year. In 1990, Murray earned second-team All-Southeastern Conference honors.

== Professional career ==
After going unselected in the 1991 NFL draft, Murray signed with the Denver Broncos as an undrafted free agent. On August 26, he was waived and signed to the practice squad. Murray spent time on-and-off the active roster and practice squad, appearing in six games on the season but recorded no statistics. He became a free agent at the end of the season. Murray re-signed with the team but was waived on August 18, 1992.
