= Shane Matthews =

American football player and coach (born 1970)

No. 9, 6
- Position: Quarterback

Personal information
- Born: June 1, 1970 (age 56); Pascagoula, Mississippi, U.S.
- Listed height: 6 ft 3 in (1.91 m)
- Listed weight: 196 lb (89 kg)

Career information
- High school: Pascagoula
- College: Florida
- NFL draft: 1993: undrafted

Career history

Playing
- Chicago Bears (1993–1996); Carolina Panthers (1997–1998); Chicago Bears (1999–2001); Washington Redskins (2002); Tampa Bay Buccaneers (2003)*; Cincinnati Bengals (2003); Buffalo Bills (2004–2005); Miami Dolphins (2006)
- * Offseason or practice squad member only

Coaching
- Gainesville High School (2009–2011) Quarterbacks coach; Nease High School (2012–2013) Head coach; Buchholz High School (2014–2015) Offensive coordinator; Gainesville High School (2016–2022) Offensive coordinator; Orlando Guardians (2023) Quarterbacks coach

Awards and highlights
- 2× Second-team All-American (1991, 1992); 2× SEC Player of the Year (1990, 1991); 3× First-team All-SEC (1990, 1991, 1992); Florida–Georgia Hall of Fame; University of Florida Athletic Hall of Fame

Career NFL statistics
- Passing attempts: 839
- Passing completions: 492
- Completion percentage: 58.6%
- TD–INT: 31–24
- Passing yards: 4,756
- Passer rating: 75
- Stats at Pro Football Reference

Michael Shane Matthews (born June 1, 1970) is an American former professional football player who was a quarterback in the National Football League (NFL) for all or part of fourteen seasons during the 1990s and 2000s. He played college football for the Florida Gators, where he was both a second-team All-American and SEC player of the year in 1991 and 1992. Thereafter, he played professionally for the Chicago Bears, Washington Redskins, and four other NFL teams.

Since retiring as a player, Matthews has lived near his college alma mater in North Central Florida, where he has hosted a sports talk radio program and coached high school football. In 2017, Matthews was incarcerated for three months in a federal prison upon pleading guilty to a federal misdemeanor charge of causing a drug to be misbranded, after playing a small part in a large health care fraud conspiracy organized by former Florida teammate Monty Grow.

== Early life ==
Matthews was born in Pascagoula, Mississippi in 1970. He attended Cleveland High School in Cleveland through his sophomore year, before transferring to Pascagoula High School in Pascagoula, Mississippi, where he played high school football for the Pascagoula Panthers. Matthews was a stand-out high school quarterback and was named the Mississippi Player of the Year as a senior.

== College career ==
Matthews accepted an athletic scholarship to attend the University of Florida in Gainesville, Florida, and was the starting quarterback for the Gators teams under coach Steve Spurrier from 1990 to 1992. In Matthews' first season as a starter in 1990, the Gators finished 9–2 overall and a league best record of 6–1 in the Southeastern Conference (SEC); in his second season in 1991, the Gators finished 10–2 overall and 7–0 in the SEC, winning their first official SEC football championship. Matthews set a new Gators team record for career passing yards (later surpassed), finished fifth in the 1991 Heisman Trophy voting as a junior, and was a first-team All-SEC selection in 1990, 1991 and 1992. He finished his college career having completed 722 of 1,202 attempts for 9,287 yards and seventy-four touchdowns, and was a team captain and the Gators' most valuable player during his final season. He led the SEC in passing for three consecutive years (1990–1992), and finished with a career efficiency rating of 137.6.

Matthews graduated from Florida with a bachelor's degree in business administration in 1997, and he was inducted into the University of Florida Athletic Hall of Fame as a "Gator Great" in 2002. In a 2006 article series regarding the top 100 Florida Gators from the first 100 years of Florida football, The Gainesville Sun recognized him as the No. 9 all-time Gator player.

== Professional career ==
=== 1993–1998 ===
After finishing his college career, Matthews was signed by the Chicago Bears in 1993. He remained the Bears' back-up and third-string quarterback for four seasons. Matthews did not appear in a regular season game with the Bears until 1996. Matthews spent the next two years with the Carolina Panthers, but remained a seldom-used back-up.

=== 1999–2002 ===
The Bears brought Matthews back for the 1999 season and in his second stint with the team he played a much bigger role. Matthews had his best season in the NFL in 1999, starting seven games, throwing for 1,645 yards and ten touchdowns. Matthews played the next two seasons with the Bears, starting a total of eight games in that span. He also relieved starter Jim Miller in the 2002 (2001 NFL season) playoff game against the Philadelphia Eagles, after Miller separated his shoulder and could not continue.

In 2002, Matthews signed with the Washington Redskins, where he played for his former college coach Steve Spurrier. Matthews started seven games for the Redskins, throwing for 1,251 yards and eleven touchdowns while sharing time with fellow former Florida QB Danny Wuerffel.

=== 2003–2006 ===
After 2002, Matthews returned to his back-up role with the Cincinnati Bengals in 2003 (no appearances) and the Buffalo Bills in 2004 and 2005 (three appearances, no starts). In 2005, he was on the roster of the Bills, but was the third-string quarterback behind J. P. Losman and Kelly Holcomb. Matthews did not appear in a regular season game during the 2005 NFL season, and retired after the end of the 2005 season.

In December 2006, Matthews was signed as the third-string quarterback for the Dolphins after former starter Daunte Culpepper was placed on injured reserve with a knee injury. Matthews did not get into a game with the Dolphins, and on March 2, 2007, he again retired from the NFL.

Over his fourteen NFL seasons, Matthews played in thirty-two regular season games, started twenty-two of them, and completed 492 of 839 passing attempts for 4,756 yards and thirty-one touchdowns.

== Coaching career ==
While working in radio, Matthews remained involved in football by teaching at off-season football camps and volunteering at youth leagues. In 2009, he was hired to be the quarterbacks coach for the Purple Hurricanes of Gainesville High School. In 2012, Matthews was hired as the head coach of the Panthers football team of Allen D. Nease Senior High School in Ponte Vedra, near Jacksonville. He coached at Nease for two seasons and then resigned to spend more time with his family, who had continued to live in Gainesville while he commuted back and forth.

In 2014, Matthews returned to coaching when he became the offensive coordinator and quarterbacks coach at Buchholz High School in Gainesville, joining a staff that included fellow Gator players Cooper Carlisle and Johnny Nichols. In 2016, he took the same position at Gainesville High School, where his son played quarterback.

Matthews was officially hired by the Orlando Guardians on September 13, 2022, where he served as the offensive coordinator and offensive play caller. On January 1, 2024, it was announced the Guardians would not be a part of the UFL Merger.

== Broadcasting career ==
Matthews began a career as a radio sports commentator soon after retiring from playing football in 2006. He has hosted or co-host several sports talk radio programs on WRUF-AM in Gainesville, and in 2008, he became a pregame and post-game co-host on Florida Gators football radio broadcasts. While working in that capacity in 2009, Matthews was chastised by then-Gator head coach Urban Meyer for criticizing his coaching decisions.

Since 2020, he has also co-hosted and co-produced "Pod Up with Matthews in the Morning", a live streamed podcast that focuses on Florida Gators sports and features frequent appearances from former coaches and teammates.

=== Florida football radio analyst ===
Before the 2021 football season, Matthews replaced veteran color analyst Lee McGriff on broadcasts of Florida football road games over the Gator Radio Network, joining long time play by play man Mick Hubert. When McGriff and Hubert both retired before the 2022 season, Matthews became the full time analyst for Gator football radio broadcasts alongside new play by play man Sean Kelley.

== Personal life ==
Matthews settled in North Central Florida with his wife and two sons after his playing career ended in 2006. His son Luke played quarterback under his father's tutelage at Gainesville High School and then walked on to the Florida Gators' squad in 2019.

=== TRICARE fraud ===
In January 2015, Mathews was approached by former teammate Monty Grow with an offer to join the marketing team at MGTEN, Grow's health care referral company. Matthews accepted the part-time position as it allowed him to continue coaching high school football, and he earned over $400,000 from the company before leaving several months later. In early 2016, he was approached by federal investigators looking into fraudulent business practices by MGTEN, including paying illegal kickbacks for patient referrals and bilking $20 million from TRICARE, a federal government health plan for U.S. military families. Matthews claimed that he did not know that the company's activities were unlawful and cooperated with the investigation, which ended in Grow's felony conviction in 2018. Matthews pled guilty to a misdemeanor charge and was required to pay a forfeiture equal to the money he earned and serve three months in a federal prison.

== See also ==
- List of Buffalo Bills players
- List of Chicago Bears players
- List of Florida Gators football All-Americans
- List of SEC Most Valuable Players
- List of University of Florida alumni
- List of Washington Redskins players
- List of University of Florida Athletic Hall of Fame members
