= Earnest Fields =

American football player (born 1968)

Profile
- Position: Linebacker

Personal information
- Born: October 15, 1968; Milan, Tennessee, U.S.
- Listed height: 5 ft 11 in (1.80 m)
- Listed weight: 245 lb (111 kg)

Career information
- College: Tennessee

Career history
- Tennessee Volunteers (1988–1991); Baltimore Stallions (1994); Nashville Kats (1998)

Awards and highlights
- Second-team All-SEC (1990)

Earnest Fields (born October 15, 1968) is an American former football linebacker. He attended the University of Tennessee from 1988 to 1991. In 1990, he recorded 140 tackles for the season. As a senior, he was named the Volunteers' captain. In 1998 Fields played for the Nashville Kats of the Arena Football League (AFL).
