= List of Sigma Chi chapters =

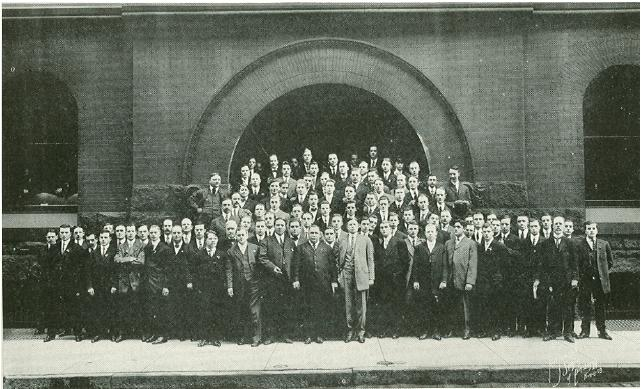
Beta Theta chapter installation on November 6, 1909

Sigma Chi is a North American collegiate fraternity. It was established in 1855 at Miami University in Oxford, Ohio, by members who split from the Delta Kappa Epsilon fraternity. The fraternity has 244 active undergraduate chapters and 152 alumni chapters across the United States and Canada. Sigma Chi uses the term "associate chapter" for its colonies.

== Collegiate chapters ==
Following is a list of Sigma Chi collegiate chapters, with active chapters indicated in bold and inactive chapters and institutions in italics.

Chapter	Charter date and range	Institution	Location	Status	Ref.
**Alpha**	June 25, 1855 – 1858; September 13, 1892 – 2012; 2017	Miami University	Oxford, Ohio	Active	(Note: Chapter went inactive during the Civil War was not reformed until 1892.) (Note: After the Alpha chapter at Miami University went inactive, the title of Alpha or Parent chapter was transferred to Gamma chapter at the fraternity's second convention on April 27, 1859. When the Miami chapter was revived in 1892, the Alpha title was restored to it.)
Gamma	December 24, 1855 – 1884; 1888–2015	Ohio Wesleyan University	Delaware, Ohio	Inactive	
Epsilon (Original)	May 1855 – 1857	University of Nashville	Nashville, Tennessee	Reissued	
**Eta**	October 10, 1857 – 1861; January 1, 1866 – 1912; 1926	University of Mississippi	Oxford, Mississippi	Active	(Note: After going inactive, the chapter was reformed in 1926 from Sigma Phi (local), established in 1926.)
Iota	February 8, 1858 – 1869	Jefferson College	Canonsburg, Pennsylvania	Inactive	(Note: Jefferson College merged with Washington College to form Washington & Jefferson College in 1865. When the Jefferson campus was closed in 1869, many of the chapter's members transferred to other institutions, leading to the Jefferson chapter going inactive.)
Lambda	September 10, 1858 – 2025	Indiana University Bloomington	Bloomington, Indiana	Inactive	
Nu (Original)	May 1859 – 1863	Washington College	Washington, Pennsylvania	Reissued	
**Xi**	June 1, 1859	DePauw University	Greencastle, Indiana	Active	
Omicron	December 12, 1859 – 2004	Dickinson College	Carlisle, Pennsylvania	Inactive	
Pi (Original)	January 31, 1860 – 1861	Erskine College	Due West, South Carolina	Inactive	
Sigma (Original)	September 27, 1860 – 1861	La Grange Synodical College	La Grange, Tennessee	Inactive	
Rho (Original) (see **Psi**)	December 10, 1860 – 1861	University of Virginia	Charlottesville, Virginia	Reissued	(Note: The chapter at the University of Virginia was originally called Rho. It went inactive during the Civil War and, by the time it reformed in 1866, the name Rho had been reassigned to a new chapter at Butler University. As a result, the Virginia chapter was reinstalled with the name Gamma in 1866; that name was available because Gamma (Original) had become Alpha (Second). However, the Virginia name was changed to Psi at the fraternity's sixth grand chapter meeting in 1866.)
**Theta**	April 3, 1863 – 2005; 2009	Gettysburg College	Gettysburg, Pennsylvania	Active	(Note: The chapter formed at Pennsylvania College, which became Gettysburg College in 1921. It absorbed the Theta chapter of Upsilon Beta on February 3, 1874.)
**Kappa**	May 4, 1864 – 1874; 1879	Bucknell University	Lewisburg, Pennsylvania	Active	(Note: Chapter formed from Iota Society, established in 1861.)
**Epsilon (Second)**	June 10, 1864 – 1880; December 22, 1892 – January 8, 1972; January 5, 1973 – 1998; 2007	George Washington University	Washington, D.C.	Active	(Note: The chapter was suspended by Sigma Chi in 1972 after being on probation for several years. However, it was reinstated in 1973.)
**Rho (Second)**	March 31, 1865	Butler University	Indianapolis, Indiana	Active	
Upsilon	December 12, 1865 – 1876	Polytechnic College of Pennsylvania	Philadelphia, Pennsylvania	Inactive	
**Zeta**	December 10, 1866	Washington and Lee University	Lexington, Virginia	Active	
**Psi** (see Rho Original)	November 29, 1866	University of Virginia	Charlottesville, Virginia	Active	
Phi	May 17, 1867 – 1887; December 7, 1899 – February 15, 1965; April 24, 1982 – 1997	Lafayette College	Easton, Pennsylvania	Inactive	(Note: In February 1966, Phi chapter notified Sigma Chi that it was withdrawing and returning its charter; the fraternity declared the chapter inactive on January 21, 1967. This action resulted from the Sigma Chi grand council's denial of a pledge born in Hawaii but of Korean ancestry. Because discriminatory practices were against the policies of Lafayette College, the college indicated it would ban Sigma Chi from its campus if the initiation did not proceed. The chapter's members and alumni decided to move forward as a local fraternity called Sigma Phi Chi.)
**Mu**	March 2, 1868 – 1876; 1880–2000; 2004	Denison University	Granville, Ohio	Active	
**Omega**	June 23, 1869 – 2000; 2005–2022; September 19, 2026	Northwestern University	Evanston, Illinois	Active	(Note: Chapter formed from Kappa Phi Lambda, established in 1865. Later, it absorbed Eclectic.)
**Sigma (Second)**	February 1869–1870; June 17, 1875 – 1882; 2010	Princeton University	Princeton, New Jersey	Active	
**Chi**	May 30, 1871 – 1918; 1936	Hanover College	Hanover, Indiana	Active	(Note: After going inactive, the chapter was reformed in 1936 from Alpha Delta Alpha (local), established in 1928.)
**Sigma Sigma**	January 1, 1871 – 1889; September 1890–1902; 1931 – November 5, 1977; 1984	Hampden–Sydney College	Hampden Sydney, Virginia	Active	(Note: After going inactive, the chapter was reformed in 1931 from Phi Sigma Epsilon (local), established in 1926. The Sigma Chi executive committee suspended the chapter in 1972, after first placing it on probation and alumni supervision without achieving the desired level of compliance.)
**Tau**	January 9, 1872 – 1890; March 31, 1896 – 1901; 1923	Roanoke College	Salem, Virginia	Active	(Note: After going inactive, the chapter was reformed in 1923 from Delta Delta (local), established in 1913.)
**Pi (Second)**	November 4, 1872 – 1885; 1984	Samford University	Homewood, Alabama	Active	(Note: Chapter formed at Howard College, which was renamed Samford in 1965.)
**Delta**	November 8, 1872 – 1885; June 18, 1910 – 1990; 1996	University of Georgia	Athens, Georgia	Active	(Note: After going inactive, the chapter reformed in 1910 from U.P.L. (local), established in 1894.)
**Nu (Second)**	December 1872–1880, 2014	Cumberland University	Lebanon, Tennessee	Active	
Beta	March 2, 1873 – 1893; September 11, 1899 – 1913	College of Wooster	Wooster, Ohio	Inactive	(Note: The Wooster chapter's successor on campus was Tri-Kapp (local, 1913 to 1965). Due to the negativity associated with those Greek letters, this group was renamed Kappa Chi (local, 1965 to 2005), with a later faction splitting to form Omega Alpha Tau (local, 1976 to c. 1995). As is the Wooster practice, these local fraternities called themselves with 'section' monikers, in this case, "VII Section". See List of fraternities and sororities at the College of Wooster.)
Beta Beta	June 19, 1873 – 1874	Mississippi College	Clinton, Mississippi	Inactive	
Gamma Gamma	March 14, 1874 – 1901	Randolph–Macon College	Ashland, Virginia	Inactive	
Epsilon Epsilon	June 11, 1874 – 1878	Monmouth College	Monmouth, Illinois	Inactive	
**Delta Delta**	March 1, 1875	Purdue University	West Lafayette, Indiana	Active	
**Phi Phi**	September 27, 1875 – 1878; 1884–1887; May 9, 1896	University of Pennsylvania	Philadelphia, Pennsylvania	Active	
**Iota Iota**	October 29, 1876 – 1877; 1914	University of Alabama	Tuscaloosa, Alabama	Active	(Note: After going inactive, the chapter was reformed in 1914 from Phi Epsilon (local), established in 1913.)
**Zeta Zeta**	December 12, 1876	Centre College	Danville, Kentucky	Active	
Psi Psi (Original) (see **Theta Theta**)	1874–1875	University of Michigan	Ann Arbor, Michigan	Inactive	(Note: The chapter at the University of Michigan was originally chartered as Psi Psi. After going inactive, Psi Psi chapter was reformed as Theta Theta because its former name had been reassigned to a chapter at Syracuse University.)
**Theta Theta** (see Psi Psi Original)	December 12, 1877 – 2003; 2009	University of Michigan	Ann Arbor, Michigan	Active	
Chi Chi	December 1879–1882, 1993–2024	Birmingham–Southern College	Birmingham, Alabama	Inactive	(Note: The chapter was formed at Southern University in Greensboro, Alabama. Southern merged with Birmingham College to form Birmingham-Southern College in 1918. The school closed due to financial difficulties in the Spring of 2024.)
Alpha Beta (Original) (see Epsilon Rho)	January 17, 1880 – 1881	Richmond College	Richmond, Virginia	Inactive	(Note: The chapter at Richmond University was originally Alpha Beta. The chapter went inactive in 1881, and its name was reassigned to the University of California, Berkeley in 1886. As a result, the Richmond chapter was called Epsilon Rho when it was reformed in 1958.)
**Delta Chi**	May 1880–1894; May 20, 1909	Wabash College	Crawfordsville, Indiana	Active	(Note: Chapter formed from Athenaeum, established in 1878.)
**Kappa Kappa**	December 21, 1881 – 1885; December 1891	University of Illinois Urbana-Champaign	Champaign, Illinois	Active	
**Zeta Psi**	January 23, 1882	University of Cincinnati	Cincinnati, Ohio	Active	
Alpha Eta	March 2, 1882 – 1889; May 14, 1902 – 1991; 2000–2022	University of Iowa	Iowa City, Iowa	Inactive	
**Alpha Theta**	March 22, 1882	Massachusetts Institute of Technology	Cambridge, Massachusetts	Active	
**Alpha Gamma**	April 21, 1882	Ohio State University	Columbus, Ohio	Active	
**Alpha Zeta**	November 3, 1882	Beloit College	Beloit, Wisconsin	Active	(Note: Chapter formed from Omega Sigma Theta, established in 1882.)
Chi Psi	1882–1883	University of Louisiana at New Orleans	New Orleans, Louisiana	Inactive	
**Alpha Epsilon**	January 11, 1883 – 2008; 2013	University of Nebraska–Lincoln	Lincoln, Nebraska	Active	
Alpha Delta	February 27, 1883 – 1891	Stevens Institute of Technology	Hoboken, New Jersey	Inactive	
Alpha Iota	May 10, 1883 – 2021	Illinois Wesleyan University	Bloomington, Illinois	Inactive	
**Alpha Kappa**	June 3, 1883 – 1886; 1980	Hillsdale College	Hillsdale, Michigan	Active	
**Alpha Lambda**	March 22, 1884 – January 30, 2020; October 26, 2025	University of Wisconsin–Madison	Madison, Wisconsin	Active	
Alpha Xi	May 23, 1884 – July 2022	University of Kansas	Lawrence, Kansas	Inactive	(Note: The university suspended the chapter in July 2022.)
Alpha Nu	September 24, 1884 – 1888; 1890–2004; 2009–2025	University of Texas at Austin	Austin, Texas	Inactive	
Alpha Mu	December 31, 1884 – 1885	Virginia Military Institute	Lexington, Virginia	Inactive	
**Alpha Omicron**	May 15, 1886	Tulane University	New Orleans, Louisiana	Active	
**Alpha Pi**	June 21, 1886 – April 2, 1980; November 8, 1980	Albion College	Albion, Michigan	Active	(Note: Chapter formed from I.S.C., established in 1882. The chapter was suspended in 1980 following the serious injury of a pledge participating in the chapter's high-risk activities. After the pledge recovered, the chapter was reinstated.)
**Alpha Beta (Second)**	June 23, 1886 – January 6, 1968; February 19, 1972 – May 19, 1979; January 12, 1980	University of California, Berkeley	Berkeley, California	Active	(Note: The Sigma Chi executive committee revoked the chapter's charter in 1968 after its members had a disagreement with grand counsul Floyd Baker about the fraternity's membership policies. The chapter was reformed in 1972. However, the executive committee suspended the chapter in 1979 for violating the constitution and pledge training policies.)
Alpha Rho	June 6, 1887 – 1891; September 1893–1989; 1993–2017	Lehigh University	Bethlehem, Pennsylvania	Inactive	(Note: Chapter formed from the Crimson Halberd Society, established in 1886.)
**Alpha Sigma**	December 7, 1888	University of Minnesota	Minneapolis, Minnesota	Active	
**Alpha Tau**	May 29, 1889 – 1900; 1913	University of North Carolina at Chapel Hill	Chapel Hill, North Carolina	Active	(Note: After going inactive, the chapter reformed from Sigma Kappa Delta (local), established in 1912.)
**Alpha Upsilon**	June 8, 1889 – 1994; 2000	University of Southern California	Los Angeles, California	Active	
**Alpha Phi**	October 10, 1890	Cornell University	Ithaca, New York	Active	
**Alpha Chi**	May 27, 1891	Pennsylvania State University	University Park, Pennsylvania	Active	(Note: In January 2021, the university suspended their recognition of the chapter through the summer of 2024 for violating COVID-19 policies in the fall of 2020. However, the chapter has continued to operate.)
**Alpha Omega**	December 19, 1891 – April 7, 1965; April 1966 – January 21, 1967; April 7, 1974 – 2018; 2023	Stanford University	Stanford, California	Active	(Note: In April 1965, the Sigma Chi executive committee suspended Alpha Omega over rumors that the chapter planned to pledge a Black student, with or without the fraternity's approval. In fact, the chapter offered a bid to a Black student three days before it was suspended. Although the executive committee reinstated it the next year, the chapter decided to disaffiliate on November 10, 1966, because of the fraternity's membership policies. Its charter was revoked by the fraternity on January 21, 1967, and the former chapter's members formed Sigma Chi Omega (local).)
Alpha Psi	December 22, 1891 – 1991; 1996–2022	Vanderbilt University	Nashville, Tennessee	Inactive	(Note: The Sigma Chi Executive Committee suspended the chapter in 2022 due to accountability issues.)
Alpha Alpha	September 28, 1892 – 2006; April 9, 2016 – 2024	Hobart College	Geneva, New York	Inactive	
Eta Eta	April 5, 1893 – May 1, 1960	Dartmouth College	Hanover, New Hampshire	Inactive	(Note: Chapter formed from Phi Zeta Mu, established in 1857. The chapter went inactive in 1960 when Dartmouth College banned the discriminatory recruitment policies that were dictated by the fraternity's national constitution, specifically limiting its membership to white males.)
**Lambda Lambda**	April 6, 1893	University of Kentucky	Lexington, Kentucky	Active	
**Nu Nu**	November 28, 1894 – October 2, 1964; 1982	Columbia University	New York City, New York	Active	(Note: In October 1964, the chapter surrendered its charter because the fraternity's membership procedure, which gave grand chapter members the ability to veto potential members, conflicted with the university's policy, which required autonomy in membership recruitment at the local level.)
**Mu Mu**	September 13, 1895	West Virginia University	Morgantown, West Virginia	Active	
**Xi Xi**	September 26, 1896 – 2002; 2007–2019; October 5, 2024	University of Missouri	Columbia, Missouri	Active	
**Omicron Omicron**	February 6, 1897 – 1952; 2011	University of Chicago	Chicago, Illinois	Active	(Note: The chapter disbanded in 1952 over the fraternity's "whites-only" policy.)
Pi Pi				Unassigned	
**Rho Rho**	April 19, 1902	University of Maine	Orono, Maine	Active	(Note: Chapter formed from Delta Rho, established in 1896.)
Tau Tau	May 4, 1903 – 2021	Washington University in St. Louis	St. Louis, Missouri	Inactive	(Note: Chapter formed from the Egyptians Club, established in 1900. In 2021, the university withdrew its recognition of the chapter for "risk management and member accountability issues". Sigma Chi suspended the chapter and, in February 2022, the chapter surrendered its charter.)
Upsilon Upsilon	September 19, 1903 – 2024	University of Washington	Seattle, Washington	Inactive	
Psi Psi (Second)	October 15, 1904 – January 11, 1957; December 8, 1963 – 1998; 2008–2021	Syracuse University	Syracuse, New York	Inactive	(Note: The chapter formed from Chi Alpha Sigma, established in 1900. The national executive committee suspended the chapter in January 1957 after its membership dwindled.)
**Beta Gamma**	May 6, 1905	Colorado College	Colorado Springs, Colorado	Active	(Note: Chapter formed from Beta Phi, established in 1904.)
**Omega Omega**	September 26, 1905	University of Arkansas	Fayetteville, Arkansas	Active	(Note: Chapter formed from the Indian Club, established in 1902.)
**Beta Delta**	September 11, 1906	University of Montana	Missoula, Montana	Active	(Note: Chapter formed from Eta Pi Mu, established in 1904.)
**Beta Epsilon**	August 21, 1908	University of Utah	Salt Lake City, Utah	Active	(Note: Chapter formed from Delta Sigma, established in 1904.)
**Beta Zeta**	February 12, 1909	University of North Dakota	Grand Forks, North Dakota	Active	(Note: Chapter formed from Bungaloo Club, established in 1906.)
**Beta Eta**	November 4, 1909 – January 8, 1972; March 29, 1973	Case Western Reserve University	Cleveland, Ohio	Active	(Note: Beta Eta chapter formed from Kappa Tau Phi, established in 1904. It originally was a "twin" chapter, serving both Case Institute of Technology and Western Reserve University. In June 1963, the chapter had grown and needed more housing than its chapter house could accommodate. It split into Beta Alpha for Western Reserve and Beta Eta for Case. The two chapters consolidated back into Beta Eta when the two colleges merged to form Case Western Reserve University.)
Beta Theta (see **Sigma Chi Beta**)	November 6, 1909 – 2018	University of Pittsburgh	Pittsburgh, Pennsylvania	Inactive	(Note: Chapter formed from Delta Kappa, established in 1902.)
**Beta Iota**	November 26, 1910 – 1996; 2000	University of Oregon	Eugene, Oregon	Active	(Note: Chapter formed from Khoda Klan, established in 1907. Later, it absorbed Psi Kappa.)
**Beta Kappa**	April 20, 1912 – 2004; 2008	University of Oklahoma	Norman, Oklahoma	Active	(Note: Chapter formed from Lambda Chi, established in 1910.)
**Beta Lambda**	April 26, 1912	Duke University	Durham, North Carolina	Active	(Note: Chapter formed from Mu Kappa Klan, established in 1909.)
**Beta Mu**	March 7, 1913 – October 23, 1971; 1981–1999; 2001–20xx ?; October 2018	University of Colorado Boulder	Boulder, Colorado	Active	(Note: Chapter formed from Theta Psi, established in 1910.)
Beta Nu	May 8, 1913 – December 14, 1965; April 14, 1973 – 2019	Brown University	Providence, Rhode Island	Inactive	(Note: Chapter formed from Chi Phi, established in 1872. The chapter returned its charter in December 1965 to comply with Brown University's policy that prohibited Sigma Phi Fraternity's restrictive membership clauses. In 1996, the former chapter's members established the local fraternity Swyndlestock. Beta Nu reformed from Swyndlestock in 1973.)
**Beta Xi**	April 22, 1913 – 2001, 2008	University of New Mexico	Albuquerque, New Mexico	Active	(Note: Chapter formed from Sigma Tau, established in 1903.)
Beta Omicron (see **Sigma Chi Omicron)**	November 11, 1916 – 2018	Iowa State University	Ames, Iowa	Inactive	(Note: Chapter formed from Rho Sigma Gamma, established in 1909.)
**Beta Pi**	December 2, 1916	Oregon State University	Corvallis, Oregon	Active	(Note: Chapter formed from Phi Delta Sigma, established in 1912.)
**Beta Rho**	November 2, 1917	Montana State University	Bozeman, Montana	Active	(Note: Chapter formed from Delta Chi, established in 1910.)
**Beta Sigma**	1917–2017, 2021	University of Tennessee	Knoxville, Tennessee	Active	(Note: Chapter formed from Sigma Kappa Delta, established in 1913.)
Beta Tau	1919–2020	Colorado State University	Fort Collins, Colorado	Inactive	(Note: Chapter formed from Sigma Rho Delta, established in 1911.)
**Beta Upsilon**	November 19, 1919	Washington State University	Pullman, Washington	Active	(Note: Chapter formed from Delta Sigma, established in 1917.)
**Beta Phi**	1919 – August 12, 1972; January 15, 1977 – 2003; 2008	University of Arizona	Tucson, Arizona	Active	(Note: Chapter formed from Tau Delta Psi, established in 1917. The Sigma Chi executive committee suspended the chapter in 1972 at the recommendation of the university and the local alumni group.)
**Beta Chi**	1921	Emory University	Atlanta, Georgia	Active	(Note: Chapter formed from Sigma Phi, established in 1918.)
**Beta Psi**	1922	Georgia Tech	Atlanta, Georgia	Active	(Note: Chapter formed from Pi Alpha Sigma, established in 1919.)
**Beta Omega**	April 22, 1922	Toronto Metropolitan University	Toronto, Ontario, Canada	Active	(Note: Chapter formed from Kappa Phi Alpha. In November 1974, the charter was expanded to include Ryerson Polytechnical Institute, which is now Toronto Metropolitan University.)
**Beta Omega**	April 22, 1922	University of Toronto	Toronto, Ontario, Canada	Active	(Note: Chapter formed from Kappa Phi Alpha. In November 1974, the charter was expanded to include Ryerson Polytechnical Institute, which is now Toronto Metropolitan University.)
Gamma Alpha				Unassigned	
Gamma Beta				Unassigned	
**Gamma Delta**	December 15, 1922	Oklahoma State University–Stillwater	Stillwater, Oklahoma	Active	(Note: Chapter formed from Sigma Beta Chi, established in 1908.)
**Gamma Epsilon**	1923 – December 1967; April 19, 1970	Whitman College	Walla Walla, Washington	Active	(Note: Chapter formed from Tau Delta Sigma, established in 1916. It went inactive in December 1967 after the Sigma Chi Grand Council failed to approve an Asian pledge. The chapter was rechartered after the fraternity changed its membership policies in April 1970.)
**Gamma Zeta**	1923	Union College	Schenectady, New York	Active	(Note: Chapter formed from Delta Theta, established in 1920.)
**Gamma Eta**	1924	University of Idaho	Moscow, Idaho	Active	(Note: Chapter formed from Phi Alpha Psi, established in 1921.)
**Gamma Theta**	1924	University of Florida	Gainesville, Florida	Active	(Note: Chapter formed from Sigma Phi, established in 1922.)
**Gamma Iota**	1925–2015, 2021	Louisiana State University	Baton Rouge, Louisiana	Active	(Note: Chapter formed from Sigma Phi, established in 1923.)
**Gamma Kappa**	1926	Utah State University	Logan, Utah	Active	(Note: Chapter formed from Sigma Alpha, established in 1904.)
**Gamma Lambda**	January 29, 1927	McGill University	Montreal, Quebec, Canada	Active	(Note: Chapter formed from Alpha Phi Kappa, established in 1921.)
Gamma Mu	1928 – June 21, 1959	Wesleyan University	Middletown, Connecticut	Inactive	(Note: The chapter formed from the Commons Club (local), established in 1906. The Sigma Chi executive council withdrew the chapter's charter when new policies at Wesleyan University conflicted with discriminatory clauses in the fraternity's constitution.)
**Gamma Nu**	1929–2016, 2022	University of South Carolina	Columbia, South Carolina	Active	(Note: Chapter formed from the Delta Club, established in 1927.)
**Gamma Xi**	October 24, 1930	University of Wyoming	Laramie, Wyoming	Active	(Note: Chapter formed from Independents Club, established in 1923.)
Gamma Omicron	1930 – April 10, 1963; September 26, 1971 – October 16, 2014	Colgate University	Hamilton, New York	Inactive	(Note: The chapter formed from Theta Pi Delta, established in 1923. The Sigma Chi executive committee revoked the chapter's charter in 1963 because the chapter had initiated two Jewish members on April 15, 1962. Changes to the fraternity's constitution had removed the "whites-only" clause but gave any one of the 65 Grand Officers the right to object to a recruit. Although these pledges were not the first Jews to join Sigma Chi, an objection had been raised. The chapter proceeded with the initiation ceremony with the support of its campus advisors, citing the university's policy that prohibited outside involvement in the selection of fraternity members. As punishment, an officer placed the chapter on strict probation for one year, starting on August 29, 1962. However, after debate at the Grand Council meeting in October 1962, this decision was overruled, clearing the way for a new ruling by the executive committee.) (Note: The university reversed its recognition of the chapter in October 2016 for hazing and violating the university's code of conduct.)
Gamma Pi	1932	University of Rochester	Rochester, New York	Active	(Note: Chapter formed from Sigma Delta Epsilon, established in 1917.)
**Gamma Rho**	May 5, 1933	Dalhousie University	Halifax, Nova Scotia, Canada	Active	(Note: Chapter formed from Delta Tau.)
**Gamma Rho**	May 5, 1933	Saint Mary's University	Halifax, Nova Scotia, Canada	Active	(Note: Chapter formed from Delta Tau.)
**Gamma Sigma**	1934–2013, 2019	Auburn University	Auburn, Alabama	Active	(Note: Chapter formed from Phi Kappa Delta, established in 1934.)
**Gamma Tau**	April 28, 1934	North Dakota State University	Fargo, North Dakota	Active	(Note: Chapter formed from Delta Kappa, established in 1922.)
**Gamma Upsilon**	1938	Mississippi State University	Starkville, Mississippi	Active	(Note: Chapter formed from the Georgia Rifles, established in 1904.)
**Gamma Phi**	1942	University of Miami	Coral Gables, Florida	Active	(Note: Chapter formed from Pi Chi, established in 1926.)
**Gamma Chi**	May 16, 1942 – 2001; September 27, 2009	University of Maryland, College Park	College Park, Maryland	Active	(Note: Chapter originated as Iota Sigma, a local fraternity that was established in 1916 and became the Delta chapter of the Sigma Phi Sigma national fraternity. It disaffiliated from Sigma Phi Sigma in 1941 and joined Sigma Chi the next year.)
Gamma Psi (see **Sigma Chi Epsilon)**	1942–2017	Michigan State University	East Lansing, Michigan	Inactive	(Note: Chapter formed from the Alpha Gamma chapter of Beta Kappa, established in 1925 and released from that fraternity during a merger.)
**Gamma Omega**	1943–1951; April 15, 1972	University of Connecticut	Storrs, Connecticut	Active	(Note: Chapter formed from Alpha Phi, established in 1912. It went inactive in 1951 when the fraternity's membership practices violated the university policy that prohibited groups that discriminated based on race or religion. After the fraternity changed its policy, the chapter reformed from Sigma Chi Alpha (local), established in 1951 by the former members of the Gamma Omega chapter.)
Delta Alpha				Unassigned	
Delta Beta				Unassigned	
Delta Gamma				Unassigned	
**Delta Epsilon**	1943	North Carolina State University	Raleigh, North Carolina	Active	
**Delta Zeta**	January 6, 1947	Willamette University	Salem, Oregon	Active	(Note: Chapter formed from Sigma Tau, established in 1919.)
**Delta Eta**	1947	University of California, Los Angeles	Los Angeles, California	Active	
**Delta Iota**	1947	University of Denver	Denver, Colorado	Active	
**Delta Kappa**	1947–2004, 2016	Bowling Green State University	Bowling Green, Ohio	Active	
Delta Lambda	1948 – October 9, 1969	Davidson College	Davidson, North Carolina	Inactive	(Note: Chapter formed from Delta Kappa, established in 1946. In 1969, the chapter voted to return its charter so that it had the local autonomy needed to initiate a black pledge.)
**Delta Mu**	1948	Southern Methodist University	Dallas, Texas	Active	
**Delta Nu**	1948	Wake Forest University	Winston-Salem, North Carolina	Active	
**Delta Xi**	January 8, 1949 – May 8, 2013; 2019	San Diego State University	San Diego, California	Active	(Note: Chapter formed from Phi Lambda Xi, established in 1925. Sigma Chi suspended the chapter in 2013.)
**Delta Omicron**	January 22, 1949	Simon Fraser University	Vancouver, British-Columbia, Canada	Active	
**Delta Omicron**	January 22, 1949	University of British Columbia	Vancouver, British-Columbia, Canada	Active	
Delta Pi	1949–2003; 2016 – July 27, 2021	Ohio University	San Diego, California	Inactive	(Note: Chapter formed from Sigma Theta Gamma, established in 1910. In 2021, the university suspended the chapter until 2025 for hazing.)
**Delta Rho**	1949	Bradley University	Peoria, Illinois	Active	(Note: Chapter formed from Sigma Phi, established in 1911.)
**Delta Sigma**	1949–1996; December 3, 2011	University of Rhode Island	Kingston, Rhode Island	Active	(Note: Chapter formed from Delta Alpha Psi, established in 1910.)
**Delta Tau**	1949–2015, March 8, 2025	Westminster College	Fulton, Missouri	Inactive	(Note: Chapter formed from Tau Sigma Tau, established in 1947.)
**Delta Upsilon**	1949	Kansas State University	Manhattan, Kansas	Active	
**Delta Phi**	February 4, 1950 – 1971; 1974	College of Puget Sound	Tacoma, Washington	Active	(Note: Chapter formed from Sigma Mu Chi (local), established in the spring of 1922 from the Amphictyon Literary Society, which was founded in 1893 and originally called the Clionian Literary Society.)
**Delta Psi**	December 2, 1950	Rensselaer Polytechnic Institute	Troy, New York	Active	(Note: Chapter formed from Phi Epsilon Phi, established in 1921.)
**Delta Omega**	1951	University of Tulsa	Tulsa, Oklahoma	Active	
Epsilon Alpha				Unassigned	
Epsilon Beta				Unassigned	
Epsilon Gamma				Unassigned	
Epsilon Delta				Unassigned	
**Epsilon Zeta**	1951–1988, 199x ?–2014, 2023	Florida State University	Tallahassee, Florida	Active	
**Epsilon Eta**	1952	California State University, Fresno	Fresno, California	Active	(Note: Chapter formed from Sigma Tau, established in 1921.)
**Epsilon Theta**	1952	San Jose State University	San Jose, California	Active	(Note: Chapter formed from Delta Sigma Gamma, established in 1939.)
Epsilon Iota	1953–1997	St. Lawrence University	Canton, New York	Inactive	(Note: Chapter formed from Gamma Omega, established in 1951.)
**Epsilon Kappa**	1954	University of Memphis	Memphis, Tennessee	Active	
**Epsilon Mu**	August 28, 1955	Texas Christian University	Fort Worth, Texas	Active	
**Epsilon Nu**	September 11, 1955 – 2012; 2017	Texas Tech University	Lubbock, Texas	Active	
**Epsilon Lambda**	September 17, 1955	Ripon College	Ripon, Wisconsin	Active	
**Epsilon Xi**	May 5, 1956 – 2015; 2021	University of Houston	Houston, Texas	Active	(Note: Chapter formed from Gan Bey (local), established on May 14, 1947.)
**Epsilon Omicron**	June 27, 1957	University of Western Ontario	London, Ontario, Canada	Active	(Note: Chapter was originally formed as the Campus Men's Club in October 1954.)
Epsilon Pi	March 30, 1958 – 2018	University of Northern Colorado	Greeley, Colorado	Inactive	(Note: Chapter formed from Delta Psi (local), established on February 4, 1903.)
Epsilon Rho (see Alpha Beta Original)	April 12, 1958 – 2019	University of Richmond	Richmond, Virginia	Inactive	
**Epsilon Tau**	April 25, 1959	Murray State University	Murray, Kentucky	Active	(Note: Chapter formed from Delta Alpha (local), established February 3, 1948.)
**Epsilon Sigma**	May 17, 1959	Florida Southern College	Lakeland, Florida	Active	
**Epsilon Upsilon**	February 13, 1960	Arizona State University	Tempe, Arizona	Active	
**Epsilon Phi**	April 10, 1960	Southeast Missouri State University	Cape Girardeau, Missouri	Active	(Note: Chapter formed from the Benton Society (local), established in 1892. At the time of the merger of the two groups in 1960, there were nearly 2,000 Benton alumni.)
Epsilon Chi	February 11, 1961 – 1983	Lamar University	Beaumont, Texas	Inactive	(Note: Chapter was chartered at Lamar State College of Technology, which became Lamar University in 1971. It formed from Kappa Phi (local), established in the spring of 1956, to affiliate with a national fraternity.)
**Epsilon Psi**	February 11, 1961	Sam Houston State University	Huntsville, Texas	Active	(Note: The chapter was chartered at Sam Houston State Teachers College, which became Sam Houston State College in 1965 and Sam Houston State University in 1969. It formed from the Cabelleros (local fraternity), established in the fall of 1949. The Cabelleros had initiated 256 members at the time of the merger.)
**Epsilon Omega**	June 17, 1962	Ball State University	Muncie, Indiana	Active	(Note: The chapter was chartered at Ball State Teachers College, which became Ball State University in 1965. It formed from Sigma Delta (local), established as the Pioneer Club in 1959 with the intent of becoming a chapter of Sigma Chi.)
Zeta Alpha				Unassigned	
Zeta Beta				Unassigned	
Zeta Gamma				Unassigned	
Zeta Delta				Unassigned	
Zeta Epsilon				Unassigned	
Beta Alpha	June 27, 1963 – April 1970	Western Reserve University	Cleveland, Ohio	Consolidated	
**Zeta Theta**	November 10, 1963	Kettering University	Flint, Michigan	Active	(Note: The chapter formed from Phi Sigma Phi (local), established in 1929 at the General Motors Institute of Technology, which became Kettering in 1998.)
**Zeta Eta**	November 24, 1963	East Texas A&M University	Commerce, Texas	Active	(Note: Chapter formed from Alpha Chi Alpha (local), established in 1961 at East Texas State College, which became Texas A&M University–Commerce in 1996 and is now East Texas A&M University.)
**Zeta Iota**	December 13, 1964	Pittsburg State University	Pittsburg, Kansas	Active	(Note: The chapter was chartered at Kansas State College of Pittsburgh, which became Pittsburgh State University in 1977. It formed from Xi Omega (local), established in October 1960 to become a chapter of Sigma Chi.)
**Zeta Kappa**	April 11, 1965 – 2007; 2017	University of California, Santa Barbara	Santa Barbara, California	Active	
**Zeta Lambda**	September 26, 1965	Kent State University	Kent, Ohio	Active	
**Zeta Mu**	December 11, 1965	Western Kentucky University	Bowling Green, Kentucky	Active	
**Zeta Nu**	January 16, 1966	Western Michigan University	Kalamazoo, Michigan	Active	
Zeta Xi	April 3, 1966 – 2021	California State University, Northridge	Los Angeles, California	Inactive	(Note: Zeta Chi was chartered at the San Fernando Valley State College, which later became California State University, Northridge.)
**Zeta Omicron**	February 19, 1967	Northern Arizona University	Flagstaff, Arizona	Active	
**Zeta Pi**	March 19, 1967	Texas A&M University–Kingsville	Kingsville, Texas	Active	(Note: Chapter was chartered at Texas College of Arts and Industries, which became Texas A&M University–Kingsville in 1993. It formed from Sigma Rho (local), established in 1962.)
**Zeta Rho**	April 21, 1967	Central Michigan University	Mount Pleasant, Michigan	Active	
Zeta Sigma	May 14, 1967 – 2016	Eastern New Mexico University	Portales, New Mexico	Inactive	(Note: Chapter formed from Alpha Alpha Chi (local), established on April 22, 1963, to become a chapter of Sigma Chi.)
**Zeta Tau**	December 10, 1967	Fort Hays State University	Hays, Kansas	Active	(Note: Chapter formed from Prometheans (local), established in 1962 by independents and former members of the Kansas Alpha chapter of Kappa Sigma Kappa who wanted to join Sigma Chi.)
**Zeta Upsilon**	April 21, 1968	College of William & Mary	Williamsburg, Virginia	Active	(Note: Chapter formed from Keplar Society (local), established on May 21, 1962, to eventually join a national fraternity. Keplar was previously called Goats and Zeta Beta.)
**Zeta Phi**	December 15, 1968 – 1985; 2008	New Mexico State University	Las Cruces, New Mexico	Active	(Note: Chapter formed from Sigma Rho (local), established in February 1966 to join Sigma Chi.)
Zeta Chi	March 23, 1969 – 2008	University of Nevada, Las Vegas	Paradise, Nevada	Inactive	(Note: Chapter was chartered at Nevada Southern College, which became the University of Nevada, Las Vegas in 1969.)
**Zeta Omega**	May 18, 1969	East Tennessee State University	Johnson City, Tennessee	Active	
**Eta Alpha**	January 11, 1970	Eastern Kentucky University	Richmond, Kentucky	Active	(Note: Chapter formed from Beta Omicron Chi (local), established on November 22, 1966.)
**Eta Beta**	March 8, 1970 – 1998; 2013	California State University, Long Beach	Long Beach, California	Active	
**Eta Gamma**	April 5, 1970	Middle Tennessee State University	Murfreesboro, Tennessee	Active	(Note: Chapter formed from Chi Alpha Pi (local), established on June 16, 1966, to become a chapter of Sigma Chi.)
**Eta Delta**	April 19, 1970	Tennessee Tech	Cookeville, Tennessee	Active	(Note: Chapter formed from Kappa Omega (local), established in October 1965.)
**Eta Epsilon**	May 16, 1970	University of South Alabama	Mobile, Alabama	Active	
**Eta Zeta**	November 21, 1970	Georgia Southern University	Statesboro, Georgia	Active	
**Eta Theta**	December 19, 1970	Georgia Southwestern State University	Americus, Georgia	Active	(Note: Chapter formed from Sigma Delta Epsilon (local), established in 1966.)
**Eta Iota**	March 6, 1971	Embry–Riddle Aeronautical University	Daytona Beach, Florida	Active	
**Eta Kappa**	April 3, 1971 – 2009; 2014	Missouri State University	Springfield, Missouri	Active	(Note: Chapter was chartered at Southwest Missouri State University, which became Missouri State University.)
Eta Lambda	November 13, 1971 – 2018	Virginia Tech	Blacksburg, Virginia	Inactive	(Note: The chapter formed from Lambda Chi (local), established on January 28, 1969. Later, it withdrew from the fraternity and became the Center Club.)
**Eta Mu**	December 11, 1971 – 2017; 2023	Eastern Illinois University	Charleston, Illinois	Active	
Eta Nu	September 17, 1972 – 2000	Northern Illinois University	DeKalb, Illinois	Inactive	(Note: Chapter formed from Theta Delta Xi (local), established on October 3, 1968.)
**Eta Xi**	April 28, 1973	Austin Peay State University	Clarksville, Tennessee	Active	(Note: Chapter formed from Kappa Sigma Phi (local), established in 1968.)
**Eta Omicron**	November 3, 1973	Indiana University of Pennsylvania	Indiana, Pennsylvania	Active	
Eta Pi	January 26, 1974 - 2025	University of Central Florida	Orlando, Florida	Inactive	(Note: Chapter was chartered at Florida Technological University, now the University of Central Florida.)
**Eta Rho**	April 20, 1974	University of North Alabama	Florence, Alabama	Active	(Note: Chapter was chartered at Florence State University, which became the University of North Alabama in 1974.)
**Eta Sigma**	January 25, 1975 – 1995; 2004	University of California, Irvine	Irvine, California	Active	
**Eta Tau**	April 12, 1975	Stephen F. Austin State University	Nacogdoches, Texas	Active	
**Eta Upsilon**	February 21, 1976	Texas A&M University	College Station, Texas	Active	(Note: Chapter formed from Sigma Rho (local), established on March 22, 1974.)
**Eta Phi**	January 22, 1977	Troy University	Troy, Alabama	Active	
**Eta Chi**	April 16, 1977	Youngstown State University	Youngstown, Ohio	Active	
Eta Psi	May 7, 1977 – 2018	Clemson University	Clemson, South Carolina	Inactive	(Note: Chapter formed from Kappa Phi (local), established in 1972.)
**Eta Omega**	April 8, 1978 – 2010; 2016	Baylor University	Waco, Texas	Active	(Note: Chapter formed from Sigma Delta Phi (local), established in the fall of 1971 by men who had belonged to a fraternity of that name at a junior college.)
Theta Alpha	May 27, 1978 – 2003; 2015–2024	PennWest Clarion	Clarion, Pennsylvania	Inactive	(Note: Chapter was chartered at Clarion State College, now PennWest Clarion. It formed from Alpha Sigma Chi (local), established on December 17, 1969.)
**Theta Beta**	March 3, 1979	University of South Florida	Tampa, Florida	Active	
**Theta Gamma**	December 6, 1980	Drake University	Des Moines, Iowa	Active	(Note: Chapter formed from Phi Sigma Chi, established in 1976.)
Theta Delta (see **Sigma Chi Sigma)**	1981–2019	University of Southern Mississippi	Hattiesburg, Mississippi	Inactive	
**Theta Epsilon**	May 1982	University of North Georgia	Dahlonega, Georgia	Active	
**Theta Zeta**	1983	Bridgewater State University	Bridgewater, Massachusetts	Active	(Note: Chapter formed from Pi Upsilon Pi, established in 1980)
**Theta Eta**	August 27, 1983	Missouri University of Science and Technology	Rolla, Missouri	Active	
**Theta Iota**	1984–2012, 2017	Saint Louis University	St. Louis, Missouri	Active	
Theta Kappa	1984–2019	University of Texas at Arlington	Arlington, Texas	Inactive	(Note: Chapter formed from Theta Zeta Chi, established in 1978. Sigma Chi suspended the chapter in 2019 after an alcohol-related hazing incident resulted in the death of a pledge.)
Theta Lambda	1984–2004	University of San Diego	San Diego, California	Inactive	
**Theta Mu**	1984–2006, 2009	Spring Hill College	Mobile, Alabama	Active	
**Theta Nu**	1984	Alma College	Alma, Michigan	Active	(Note: Chapter formed from Phi Lambda Chi (local), established in 1981.)
Theta Xi	1985–2015	California State University, Sacramento	Sacramento, California	Inactive	
**Theta Omicron**	April 27, 1985	University of California, Davis	Davis, California	Active	
Theta Pi	1985–2018	Indiana State University	Terre Haute, Indiana	Inactive	
**Theta Rho**	1985–2015, 2022	Illinois State University	Normal, Illinois	Active	
**Theta Sigma**	November 16, 1985	California State Polytechnic University, Pomona	Pomona, California	Active	
**Theta Tau**	1986–1999, 2009	Texas State University	San Marcos, Texas	Active	
**Theta Upsilon**	1986	Yale University	New Haven, Connecticut	Active	(Note: Chapter formed from the Old Campus Society (local), established in 1984.)
Theta Phi	1986–2002	California Polytechnic State University, San Luis Obispo	San Luis Obispo, California	Inactive	
**Theta Chi**	1987	Arkansas State University	Jonesboro, Arkansas	Active	
**Theta Psi**	March 28, 1987	University of Waterloo	Waterloo, Ontario, Canada	Active	(Note: Chapter formed from Delta Omega Chi (local), established in 1985.)
**Theta Omega**	April 11, 1987	Elon University	Elon, North Carolina	Active	
Iota Alpha	1987–2016	California State University, San Bernardino	San Bernardino, California	Inactive	
Iota Beta	1987–2015	James Madison University	Harrisonburg, Virginia	Inactive	
**Iota Gamma**	1988	Jacksonville University	Jacksonville, Florida	Active	
Iota Delta	1988–2004	University at Albany, SUNY	Albany, New York	Inactive	
**Iota Epsilon**	1988	College of Charleston	Charleston, South Carolina	Active	
**Iota Zeta**	April 17, 1988	Clarkson University	Potsdam, New York	Active	
**Iota Eta**	1988	Western Connecticut State University	Danbury, Connecticut	Active	
Iota Theta	1988–2013	University of Dayton	Dayton, Ohio	Inactive	
**Iota Kappa**	1988	Fairleigh Dickinson University	Madison, New Jersey	Active	
**Iota Lambda**	1989	University of Louisville	Louisville, Kentucky	Active	
**Iota Mu**	March 18, 1989	Wilfrid Laurier University	Waterloo, Ontario, Canada	Active	(Note: Chapter formed from Sigma Theta Chi (local), established in 1987.)
**Iota Nu**	1989	Furman University	Greenville, South Carolina	Active	(Note: Chapter formed from Propylon (local), established in 1981.)
**Iota Xi**	April 29, 1989	George Mason University	Fairfax, Virginia	Active	
**Iota Omicron**	October 28, 1989	Western Illinois University	Macomb, Illinois	Active	
**Iota Pi**	1989	Marquette University	Milwaukee, Wisconsin	Active	
Iota Rho	February 24, 1990 – 20xx ?	Bishop's University	Lennoxville, Quebec, Canada	Inactive	
**Iota Sigma**	March 31, 1990	Valparaiso University	Valparaiso, Indiana	Active	
**Iota Tau**	1990	University of St. Thomas	Saint Paul, Minnesota	Active	
**Iota Upsilon**	1990–2014, 2021	Boston University	Boston, Massachusetts	Active	
**Iota Phi**	1990	University of North Texas	Denton, Texas	Active	(Note: Chapter formed from Kappa Omega (local), established in 1984.)
**Iota Chi**	1991	University of California, San Diego	San Diego, California	Active	
**Iota Psi**	1991–2017, 2024	Rutgers University–New Brunswick	New Brunswick, New Jersey	Active	
**Iota Omega**	1991	Loyola Marymount University	Los Angeles, California	Active	
Kappa Alpha				Unassigned	
**Kappa Beta**	1991	University of North Florida	Jacksonville, Florida	Active	
**Kappa Gamma**	1991	Western Carolina University	Cullowhee, North Carolina	Active	
Kappa Delta				Unassigned	
**Kappa Epsilon**	1992–2012, 2023	University of Delaware	Newark, Delaware	Active	
**Kappa Zeta**	1992	Radford University	Radford, Virginia	Active	
**Kappa Eta**	1992	Harvard University	Cambridge, Massachusetts	Active	
**Kappa Theta**	1992	California State University, Chico	Chico, California	Active	(Note: Chapter formed from Alpha Chi Epsilon (local), established in 1989.)
**Kappa Iota**	1993	Southern Utah University	Cedar City, Utah	Active	
**Kappa Lambda**	1994	College of Idaho	Caldwell, Idaho	Active	
**Kappa Mu**	April 9, 1994	University of Windsor	Windsor, Ontario, Canada	Active	
Kappa Nu	1994–2004	State University of New York at Oswego	Oswego, New York	Inactive	
**Kappa Xi**	1996	Tarleton State University	Stephenville, Texas	Active	
**Kappa Omicron**	1998	Pepperdine University	Malibu, California	Active	(Note: Chapter formed from Shield (local), established in 1991.)
**Kappa Pi**	2000–2011, 2021	Towson University	Towson, Maryland	Active	
**Kappa Rho**	October 9, 1999	American University	Washington, D.C.	Active	
**Kappa Sigma**	2003	University of the Pacific	Stockton, California	Active	(Note: Chapter formed from Alpha Kappa (local) established in 1864.)
**Kappa Tau**	November 22, 2003	Minnesota State University, Mankato	Mankato, Minnesota	Active	(Note: Chapter formed from Beta Sigma Lambda (local), established in 1999.)
Kappa Upsilon	2004–2023	Johns Hopkins University	Baltimore, Maryland	Inactive	
**Kappa Phi**	2005	Embry–Riddle Aeronautical University, Prescott	Prescott, Arizona	Active	
Kappa Chi	December 10, 2005 – 2023	Villanova University	Villanova, Pennsylvania	Inactive	
**Kappa Psi**	2007	University of Tennessee at Martin	Martin, Tennessee	Active	
Kappa Omega	2007–2022	University of Tampa	Tampa, Florida	Inactive	
Lambda Alpha	2007–2024	Knox College	Galesburg, Illinois	Inactive	
Lambda Beta	2008–2020	University of West Florida	Pensacola, Florida	Inactive	
**Lambda Gamma**	2008	Santa Clara University	Santa Clara, California	Active	
**Lambda Delta**	March 14, 2009	University of California, Merced	Merced, California	Active	
**Lambda Epsilon**	2009	University of New Haven	West Haven, Connecticut	Active	
**Lambda Zeta**	2010	Florida Gulf Coast University	Lee County, Florida	Active	
**Lambda Eta**	2010	Bryant University	Smithfield, Rhode Island	Active	
**Lambda Theta**	November 20, 2010	University of Ottawa	Ottawa, Ontario, Canada	Active	
**Lambda Iota**	2011	Florida International University	Miami, Florida	Active	
**Lambda Kappa**	2011	Rochester Institute of Technology	Henrietta, New York	Active	
**Lambda Mu**	October 22, 2011	Valdosta State University	Valdosta, Georgia	Active	
**Lambda Nu**	2012	Loyola University Chicago	Chicago, Illinois	Active	
**Lambda Xi**	April 28, 2012	Boise State University	Boise, Idaho	Active	
**Lambda Omicron**	2012	Southern Illinois University Carbondale	Carbondale, Illinois	Active	
**Lambda Pi**	November 3, 2012	Carnegie Mellon University	Pittsburgh, Pennsylvania	Active	
Lambda Rho	2012 – March 17, 2022	Saint Francis University	Loretto, Pennsylvania	Active	(Note: The Sigma Chi executive committee suspended the chapter in 2022 after years of declining membership.)
**Lambda Sigma**	2013	University of New Hampshire	Durham, New Hampshire	Active	
**Lambda Tau**	May 4, 2013	Florida Atlantic University	Boca Raton, Florida	Active	
**Lambda Upsilon**	2013	Bentley University	Waltham, Massachusetts	Active	
**Lambda Phi**	2014	University of West Georgia	Carrollton, Georgia	Active	
**Lambda Chi**	2014	University of Wisconsin–Milwaukee	Milwaukee, Wisconsin	Active	
**Lambda Psi**	2014	University of Louisiana at Lafayette	Lafayette, Louisiana	Active	
**Lambda Omega**	2015	DePaul University	Chicago, Illinois	Active	
**Mu Alpha**	2015	University of North Carolina at Charlotte	Charlotte, North Carolina	Inactive	
**Mu Beta**	2015	California State University San Marcos	San Marcos, California	Active	
**Mu Gamma**	2017	Binghamton University	Binghamton, New York	Active	
Mu Delta	2017 – February 24, 2023	Virginia Commonwealth University	Richmond, Virginia	Inactive	
**Mu Epsilon**	December 2, 2017	University of Massachusetts Amherst	Amherst, Massachusetts	Active	
**Mu Zeta**	December 1, 2018	Brock University	St. Catharines, Ontario, Canada	Active	
**Mu Eta**	2019	West Chester University	West Chester, Pennsylvania	Active	
**Mu Theta**	November 11, 2019	Georgetown University	Washington, D.C.	Active	
**Mu Iota**	2021	University of Texas at San Antonio	San Antonio, Texas	Active	
**Mu Kappa**	October 16, 2021	University of North Carolina Wilmington	Wilmington, North Carolina	Active	
**Mu Lambda**	2023	Sacred Heart University	Fairfield, Connecticut	Active	
**Mu Nu**	2024	University of Alabama at Birmingham	Birmingham, Alabama	Active	
**Mu Xi**	February 22, 2025	Belmont University	Nashville, Tennessee	Active	
**Sigma Chi Beta** (see Beta Theta)		University of Pittsburgh	Pittsburgh, Pennsylvania	Associate	
**Sigma Chi Epsilon** (see Gamma Psi)		Michigan State University	East Lansing, Michigan	Associate	
**Sigma Chi Mu**		Mount Royal University	Calgary, Alberta, Canada	Associate	(Note: This colony was established on August 2, 2018.)
**Sigma Chi Sigma** (see Theta Delta)		University of Southern Mississippi	Hattiesburg, Mississippi	Associate	

== Alumni chapters ==
In the following Sigma Chi alumni chapter list, active chapters are indicated in bold and inactive chapters are in italics.

Chapter	Original name	Charter date and range	City	State or province or country	Status	Ref.
Akron Alumni			Akron	Ohio	Inactive	
**Albuquerque Alumni**			Alburquerque	New Mexico	Active	
**Altoona Alumni**		November 27, 1912	Altoona	Pennsylvania		
**Americus Alumni**			Americus	Georgia	Active	
**Anchorage Alumni**			Anchorage	Alaska	Active	
**Anderson Alumni**		May 7, 1913	Anderson	Indiana		
Asheville Alumni			Asheville	North Carolina	Inactive	
**Atlanta Alumni**		March 11, 1904	Atlanta	Georgia	Active	
**Austin Alumni**			Austin	Texas	Active	
Baltimore Alumni		February 25, 1903	Baltimore	Maryland	Inactive	
**Bartlesville Alumni**			Bartlesville	Oklahoma	Active	
**Baton Rouge Alumni Association**			Baton Rouge	Louisiana	Active	
Billings Alumni			Billings	Montana	Inactive	
**Birmingham Alumni**		June 19, 1914	Birmingham	Alabama	Active	
**Bismarck Alumni**			Bismarck	North Dakota	Active	
Bloomington Alumni		June 11, 1907	Bloomington	Indiana	Inactive	
Boca Rotan Alumni			Boca Raton	Florida	Active	
**Boise Alumni**			Boise	Idaho	Active	
**Boston Alumni**		March 26, 1900	Newton	Massachusetts	Active	
Bozeman Alumni			Bozeman	Montana	Inactive	
**Calgary Alumni**		April 2017	Calgory	Alberta, Canada	Active	
**California Capital Region Alumni**			Folsom	California	Active	
Capital City Alumni			Washington, D.C.	District of Columbia	Inactive	
**Central Arkansas Alumni**			Little Rock	Arkansas	Active	
Central Florida Alumni				Florida	Inactive	
Central Iowa Alumni Association				Iowa	Inactive	
Central Kentucky Alumni				Kentucky	Inactive	
**Central Michigan Alumni**			Mount Pleasant	Michigan	Active	
**Central Missouri Alumni**			Columbia	Missouri	Active	
**Central New York Alumni Association**			Jamesville	New York	Active	
**Central Ohio Alumni**			Galena	Ohio	Active	
**Central Texas Alumni**			San Marcos	Texas	Active	
Central Virginia Alumni			Richmond	Virginia	Inactive	
Charleston S.C. Alumni			Charleston	South Carolina	Inactive	
**Charleston, WV Alumni**		February 26, 1906	Charleston	West Virginia	Active	
**Charlotte Alumni**			Charlotte	North Carolina	Active	
**Chattahoochee Valley Area Alumni**			LaGrange	Georgia	Active	
**Chattanooga Alumni**			Chattanooga	Tennessee	Active	
Chesapeake Bay Alumni				Virginia	Inactive	
Cheyenne Alumni			Cheyenne	Wyoming	Inactive	
Chicago Alumni	Omega Alumni	1882	Chicago	Illinois	Inactive	
**Chicago DuPage Alumni**			Riverside	Illinois	Active	
**Chicago Metro Alumni**			Glenview	Illinois	Active	
**Chicago North Shore Alumni**			Deerfield	Illinois	Active	
Chicago Northwest Suburban Alumni			Chicago	Illinois	Inactive	
**Cincinnati Alumni**	Theta Alumni	1881	Cincinnati	Ohio	Active	
**Clarksburg Alumni**		May 17, 1913	Clarksburg	West Virginia		
**Clarksville (Tenn.) Alumni**			Clarksville	Tennessee	Active	
**Cleveland Alumni**		January 5, 1905	Westlake	Ohio	Active	
Cleveland County Alumni Association			Cleveland County	Oklahoma	Inactive	
**College Park Alumni**			Olney	Maryland	Active	
Collin County Alumni			Collin County	Texas	Inactive	
**Columbia Alumni**			Columbia	South Carolina	Active	
Columbus Alumni		March 30, 1901	Columbus	Ohio	Inactive	
Coos Bay Alumni		January 13, 1915	Coos Bay, Oregon	Oregon		
Corpus Christi Alumni			Corpus Christi	Texas	Inactive	
**Dallas Alumni**		November 23, 1911	McKinney	Texas	Active	
Danville Alumni		January 11, 1910	Danville	Kentucky	Inactive	
Dayton Area Alumni		June 8, 1909	Dayton	Ohio	Inactive	
**Denver Alumni**		March 1, 1902	Highlands Ranch	Colorado	Active	
Des Moines Alumni		March 14, 1912	Des Moines	Iowa	Inactive	
**Detroit Alumni**		March 25, 1904	Rochester	Michigan	Active	
Duluth Alumni		November 3, 1910	Duluth	Minnesota	Inactive	
Elliott Bay Alumni			Seattle	Washington	Inactive	
**Enid Alumni**			Enid	Oklahoma	Active	
Eugene Alumni'		March 28, 1914	Eugene	Oregon		
**Fargo Alumni**		September 1, 1914	Fargo	North Dakota	Active	
**Flagstaff Alumni**			Phoenix	Arizona	Active	
**Fort Lauderdale Alumni**			Fort Lauderdale	Florida	Active	
**Fort Myers/Lee County Alumni Association**			Naples	Florida	Active	
**Fort Worth Alumni**			Burleson	Texas	Active	
**Fresno Alumni**			Fresno	California	Active	
**Grand Forks Alumni**			Moorhead	Minnesota	Active	
Grand Rapids Alumni			Grand Rapids	Michigan	Inactive	
**Greater Fairfield County Alumni**			Stamford	Connecticut	Active	
Greater Miami Alumni			Miami	Florida	Active	
Great Minnesota Alumni			Minneapolis	Minnesota	Active	
Greater Nebraska Alumni				Nebraska	Inactive	
Green Valley Alumni			Green Valley	Arizona	Inactive	
**Halifax/Greater Atlantic Canada Alumni**		May 5, 1933	Dartmouth	Nova Scotia, Canada	Active	
Hamilton Alumni		May 16, 1907	Hamilton	Ohio	Inactive	
**Harrisburg Alumni**		July 26, 1907	Mount Joy	Pennsylvania	Active	
**Hartford Alumni**			Enfield	Connecticut	Active	
**Hilton Head Alumni**			Okatie	South Carolina	Active	
**Honolulu Alumni**		March 28, 1914	Honolulu	Hawaii	Active	
**Houston Alumni**			Houston	Texas	Active	
**Indianapolis Alumni**	Iota Alumni	1882	Plainfield	Indiana	Active	
**Inland Empire Alumni**			Ontario	California	Active	
Iowa City-Cedar Rapids Alumni			Iowa City	Iowa	Inactive	
**Jackson Alumni**			Madison	Mississippi	Active	
Jacksonville Alumni			Jacksonville	Florida	Inactive	
Johnson County Area Alumni			Johnson County	Kansas	Inactive	
Kalamazoo Alumni			Kalamazoo	Michigan	Inactive	
Kansas City MO Alumni		August 8, 1902	Kansas City	Missouri	Inactive	
**Kansas City Alumni**			Overland Park	Kansas	Active	
**Katy Area Alumni**			Katy	Texas	Active	
**Kern County Alumni**			Bakersfield	California	Active	
**Knoxville Alumni**			Morristown	Tennessee	Active	
**Lafayette Alumni**			Lafayette	Louisiana	Active	
Lafayette, IN Alumni	Eta Alumni	1881 – before 1912	Lafayette	Indiana	Inactive	
Lakeland Alumni			Lakeland	Florida	Inactive	
Lincoln Alumni		April 15, 1907	Lincoln	Nebraska	Inactive	
Lincoln Park Alumni			Lincoln Park	Illinois	Inactive	
Little Rock Alumni		April 20, 1909	Little Rock	Arkansas	Inactive	
**London UK Alumni**			London	England	Active	
Los Angeles Alumni		July 7, 1903	Los Angeles	California	Inactive	
**Los Angeles County Alumni**			Manhattan Beach	California	Active	
**Louisville Alumni**		April 13, 1904	Louisville	Kentucky	Active	
**Lubbock Alumni**			Lubbock	Texas	Active	
Madison Alumni		June 22, 1909	Madison	Wisconsin	Inactive	
Manhattan Alumni			Manhattan	Kansas	Inactive	
Memphis Area Alumni		October 8, 1907	Memphis	Tennessee	Inactive	
**Mid Cities Alumni**			Allen	Texas	Active	
**Midland Texas Alumni**			Midland	Texas	Active	
Minneapolis Alumni			Minneapolis	Minnesota	Inactive	
**Milwaukee Alumni**		December 22, 1899	Milwaukee	Wisconsin	Active	
Manila Alumni		August 14, 1905	Manila	Philippines		
Mississippi Gulf Coast Alumni				Mississippi	Inactive	
**Missoula Alumni**		March 2, 1909	Missoula	Montana	Active	
**Mobile Alumni**			Mobile	Alabama	Active	
**Monterey Bay Alumni**			Aptos	California	Active	
**Montreal Alumni**			Montreal	Quebec, Canada	Active	
**Morgantown Alumni**			Morgantown	West Virginia	Active	
Montgomery Alumni	Beta Alumni	1887	Montgomery	Alabama	Inactive	
**Naples Alumni**			Naples	Florida	Active	
Napa-Sonoma Alumni			Napa	California	Inactive	
**Narragansett Bay Alumni**			Portsmouth	Rhode Island	Active	
**Nashville Alumni**		May 10, 1893	Franklin	Tennessee	Active	
**Nebraska Area Alumni**			Lincoln	Nebraska	Active	
**New Haven Alumni**			Burlington	Connecticut	Active	
New Orleans Alumni		1893	New Orleans	Louisiana	Inactive	
**New York City Alumni**	Gamma Alumni	1890	Bethel	New York	Active	
**North Alabama Alumni**			Muscle Shoals	Alabama	Active	
North Florida Alumni Association				Florida	Inactive	
North Texas Alumni				Texas	Inactive	
Northeast Arkansas Alumni				Arkansas	Inactive	
Northern Nevada Alumni				Nevada	Inactive	
**Northern New Jersey Alumni**			West Orange	New Jersey	Active	
**Northern Virginia Alumni**			Fairfax	Virginia	Active	
Northwest Arkansas Alumni				Arkansas	Inactive	
Northwest Indiana Alumni				Indiana	Inactive	
**Oakland East Bay Alumni**			Concord	California	Active	
Oklahoma City Alumni		March 16, 1909	Oklahoma City	Oklahoma	Inactive	
**Omaha Alumni**		January 13, 1915	Omaha	Nebraska	Active	
**Orange County Alumni**			Lake Forst	California	Active	
**Orlando Alumni**			Orlando	Florida	Active	
**Ottawa Alumni**			Nepean	Ontario, Canada	Active	
**Palm Beach Alumni**			Palm Beach	Florida	Active	
Parkersburg Alumni			Parkersburg	West Virginia	Inactive	
Peninsula-San Mateo Alumni			San Mateo	California	Inactive	
Peoria Alumni			Peoria	Illinois	Inactive	
Philadelphia Alumni		1893	Philadelphia	Pennsylvania	Inactive	
**Phoenix Alumni**		December 18, 1906	Scottsdale	Arizona	Active	
**Pike's Peak Region Alumni**			Colorado Springs	Colorado	Active	
Peoria Alumni		July 15, 1901	Peoria	Illinois	Inactive	
**Pittsburgh Alumni**		October 2, 1902	Pittsburgh	Pennsylvania	Active	
Plymouth Alumni			Plymouth	Illinois	Inactive	
Portland Alumni		February 2, 1911	Portland	Oregon	Inactive	
Prescott Alumni			Prescott	Arizona	Inactive	
**Providence Alumni**			Providence	Rhode Island	Active	
**Raleigh Alumni**			Raleigh	North Carolina	Active	
Rochester Alumni			Rochester	New York	Inactive	
**St. Louis Alumni**		May 4, 1903	St. Louis	Missouri	Active	
St. Paul-Minneapolis		April 13, 1901	Saint Paul	Minneapolis	Inactive	
**Salt Lake City Alumni**		June 16, 1908	Salt Lake City	Utah	Active	
**San Antonio Alumni**			San Antonio	Texas	Active	
**San Diego Alumni**			San Diego	California	Active	
San Fernando Valley Alumni Association			San Fernando	California	Inactive	
**San Francisco Alumni Association**		November 13, 1902	San Francisco	California	Active	
San Jose Alumni			San Jose	California	Inactive	
Santa Barbara Alumni Association			Santa Barbara	California	Inactive	
**Sarasota Area Sigma Chi Alumni**			Cortez	Florida	Active	
**Seattle Alumni**		November 4, 1908	Seattle	Washington	Active	
Shreveport Alumni			Shreveport	Louisiana	Inactive	
**South Mississippi Alumni**			Hattiesburg	Mississippi	Active	
Southeast Missouri Alumni				Missouri	Inactive	
Southern Maine Alumni Association				Maine	Inactive	
Southern Minnesota Alumni				Minnesota	Inactive	
**Southern Nevada Alumni**			Las Vegas	Nevada	Active	
**Southern Utah Alumni**			Salt Lake City	Utah	Active	
Space Coast Alumni			Merritt Island	Florida	Active	
Spokane Alumni		April 11, 1912	Spokane	Washington	Inactive	
Springfield Alumni	Alpha Alumni	1874 – 1910	Springfield	Ohio	Inactive	
Springfield IL Alumni		June 27, 1902 – before 1912	Springfield	Illinois	Inactive	
**Starkville Alumni**			Starkville	Mississippi	Active	
State College Alumni			State College	Pennsylvania	Inactive	
**Statesboro Alumni**			Statesboro	Georgia	Active	
**Stephensville Alumni**			Seguin	Texas	Active	
**Stillwater Alumni**			Stillwater	Oklahoma	Active	
**Stones River Alumni**			Murfreesboro	Tennessee	Active	
Syracuse Alumni		May 15, 1916	Syracuse	New York		
**Tacoma Alumni**		April 6, 1911	Tacoma	Washington	Active	
Tampa Bay Alumni			Tampa	Florida	Inactive	
Toledo Area Alumni Association		January 5, 1905	Toledo	Ohio	Inactive	
**Toronto Alumni**			Toronto	Ontario, Canada	Active	
Troy Alumni		December 1911	Troy	New York	Inactive	
**Tucson Alumni**			Tucson	Arizona	Active	
**Tulsa Alumni**			Tulsa	Oklahoma	Active	
Tupelo Alumni			Tupelo	Mississippi	Inactive	
**Twin City Alumni**			Minneapolis-Saint Paul	Minnesota	Active	
Upstate S.C. Alumni				South Carolina	Inactive	
Valparaiso University Alumni			Valparaiso	Indiana	Inactive	
**Vancouver Alumni**			Vancouver	British Columbia, Canada	Active	
**Washington D.C. Alumni**	Epsilon Alumni	1889	Arlington	Virginia	Active	
**West Michigan Alumni**			Portage	Michigan	Active	
West Palm Beach Alumni			Palm Beach Gardens	Florida	Active	
Western Florida Alumni Association				Florida	Inactive	
**Wichita Alumni**		May 15, 1916	Wichita	Kansas		
**Windsor Alumni**			Windsor	Ontario, Canada	Active	
**The Woodlands, Texas Alumni**			The Woodlands	Texas	Active	
**Youngstown Alumni**			Youngstown	Ohio	Active	
