= Todd Kinchen =

American football player (born 1969)

No. 81, 89
- Positions: Wide receiver, return specialist

Personal information
- Born: January 7, 1969 (age 57); Baton Rouge, Louisiana, U.S.
- Listed height: 5 ft 11 in (1.80 m)
- Listed weight: 187 lb (85 kg)

Career information
- High school: Trafton Academy (Baton Rouge)
- College: LSU
- NFL draft: 1992: 3rd round, 60th overall pick

Career history
- Los Angeles / St. Louis Rams (1992–1995); Denver Broncos (1996); Atlanta Falcons (1997–1998); Carolina Panthers (1999)*
- * Offseason or practice squad member only

Awards and highlights
- 2× First-team All-SEC (1990, 1991)

Career NFL statistics
- Receptions: 95
- Receiving yards: 1,358
- Receiving touchdowns: 10
- Stats at Pro Football Reference

Todd Kinchen (born January 7, 1969) is an American former professional football player who was a wide receiver for seven seasons in the National Football League (NFL) for the Los Angeles / St. Louis Rams, Denver Broncos, and Atlanta Falcons. He was selected by the Rams in the third round of the 1992 NFL draft. He currently holds an NFL record with two punt return touchdowns in a single game, which he shares with 13 other players. His father is Gaynell "Gus" Kinchen, a member of the 1958 LSU Tigers football team and one of the famed Chinese Bandits. His brother Brian also played in the NFL.
