= Will White (American football) =

American college football player (born 1970)

No. 22
- Position: Defensive back

Personal information
- Born: June 25, 1970 (age 56)
- Listed height: 6 ft 0 in (1.83 m)
- Listed weight: 202 lb (92 kg)

Career information
- High school: Amos P. Godby (Tallahassee, Florida)
- College: Florida (1989–1992)
- NFL draft: 1993: 7th round, 172nd overall pick

Career history
- Phoenix Cardinals (1993)*; Shreveport Pirates (1995); Hamilton Tiger-Cats (1996)
- * Offseason or practice squad member only

Willie Davis (Will) White (born June 25, 1970) is an American former college football player who was a free safety at the University of Florida for four seasons in the late 80's/early 90s. He was recognized as an All-American. White was selected by the Phoenix Cardinals in the 7th round (172nd overall) of the 1993 NFL draft.

== Early life ==
White attended Amos P. Godby High School, where in his senior year in 1987 he led the Cougars to a Class 4A State Championship at quarterback.

== College career ==
White accepted an athletic scholarship to attend the University of Florida in Gainesville, where he played for coaches Galen Hall, Interim Coach Gary Darnell and Steve Spurrier's Gators from 1988 to 1992. White tied a school record with three interceptions in a game versus Alabama in 1990. White would end the 1990 season with 7 interceptions, tying the UF single season record. White was selected as a 1st Team All-American by the Football Writer's Associate of America and was a semifinalist for the Jim Thorpe Award. White earned 1st Team All-SEC accolades three straight seasons in 1990, 1991, and 1992. White finished his career with a (then) school record 14 interceptions which still sits at #2(t) on the all-time list.

In 2020, The Gainesville Sun writers ranked White #9 of the top ten Safeties to ever play for The University of Florida.

== Professional career ==
White was drafted 172nd overall in the 1993 NFL draft by the Phoenix Cardinals
