= Stanford Cardinal football statistical leaders =

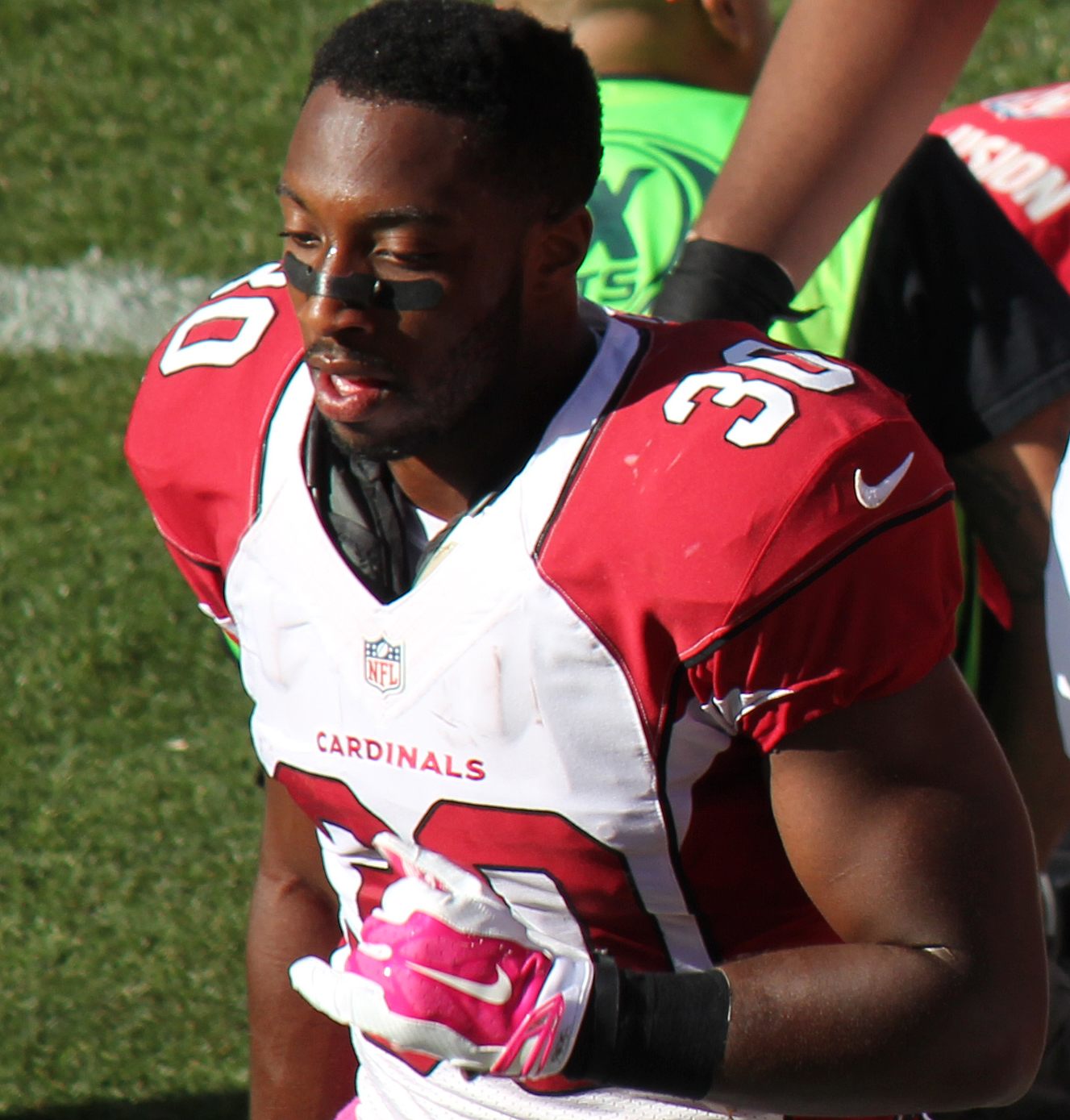
Stepfan Taylor is the Cardinal's career leader in rushing yards.

The Stanford Cardinal football statistical leaders are individual statistical leaders of the Stanford Cardinal football program in various categories, including passing, rushing, receiving, total offense, all-purpose yardage, defensive stats, and kicking. Within those areas, the lists identify single-game, single-season, and career leaders. Since the 2024 season, the Cardinal has represented Stanford University in the NCAA Division I FBS Atlantic Coast Conference.

Although Stanford began competing in intercollegiate football in 1891, the school's official record book generally does not lists players from before the 1940s, as records from before this year are often incomplete and inconsistent.

These lists are dominated by more recent players for several reasons:

- Since the 1940s, seasons have increased from 10 games to 11 and then 12 games in length.
- The NCAA didn't allow freshmen to play varsity football until 1972 (with the exception of the World War II years), allowing players to have four-year careers.
- Bowl games only began counting toward single-season and career statistics in 2002. Stanford has played in a bowl game 10 times since this decision, allowing players in these years (2009 through 2017) an extra game to accumulate statistics.
- The Pac-12 Conference, in which Stanford competed from 1919 to 2023, (Note: Technically, the Pac-12 did not exist until 1959. However, that conference considers its history to have started with the formation of the Pacific Coast Conference (PCC), which operated from 1915 to 1959. Stanford joined the PCC in 1919 and remained a member until the conference's dissolution. Four PCC schools immediately formed the conference that eventually became the Pac-12, with Stanford joining a month later, in time for the new conference's first football season.) held a championship game from 2011 until that conference's effective demise after the 2023 season. Stanford appeared in that game four times. Similarly, the ACC has held its own championship game since 2015, giving future Stanford teams a chance for another extra game.
- Since 2018, players have been allowed to participate in as many as four games in a redshirt season; previously, playing in even one game "burned" the redshirt. Since 2024, postseason games have not counted against the four-game limit. These changes to redshirt rules have given very recent players several extra games to accumulate statistics.
- Due to COVID-19 disruptions, the NCAA did not count the 2020 season against the eligibility of any football player, giving all players active in that season five years of eligibility instead of the normal four.
- The top nine seasons in Stanford history in both total offensive yards and points scored have all come since 1999.

These lists are updated through the end of the 2025 season.

== Passing ==
=== Passing yards ===
Career
| Rank | Player | Yards | Years |
|---|---|---|---|
| 1 | Steve Stenstrom | 10,911 | 1991 1992 1993 1994 |
| 2 | Andrew Luck | 9,430 | 2009 2010 2011 |
| 3 | Kevin Hogan | 9,385 | 2012 2013 2014 2015 |
| 4 | John Elway | 9,349 | 1979 1980 1981 1982 |
| 5 | Jim Plunkett | 7,809 | 1968 1969 1970 |
| 6 | John Paye | 7,669 | 1983 1984 1985 1986 |
| 7 | Todd Husak | 6,834 | 1996 1997 1998 1999 |
| 8 | Guy Benjamin | 6,215 | 1974 1975 1976 1977 |
| 9 | K. J. Costello | 6,151 | 2017 2018 2019 |
| 10 | Trent Edwards | 5,443 | 2003 2004 2005 2006 |

Single season
| Rank | Player | Yards | Year |
|---|---|---|---|
| 1 | Steve Stenstrom | 3,627 | 1993 |
| 2 | K. J. Costello | 3,540 | 2018 |
| 3 | Andrew Luck | 3,517 | 2011 |
| 4 | Andrew Luck | 3,338 | 2010 |
| 5 | John Elway | 3,242 | 1982 |
| 6 | Steve Dils | 3,153 | 1978 |
| 7 | Todd Husak | 3,092 | 1998 |
| 8 | Jim Plunkett | 2,980 | 1970 |
| 9 | Tanner McKee | 2,947 | 2022 |
| 10 | Todd Husak | 2,946 | 1999 |

Single game
| Rank | Player | Yards | Year | Opponent |
|---|---|---|---|---|
| 1 | Davis Mills | 504 | 2019 | Washington State |
| 2 | Todd Husak | 450 | 1998 | Oregon State |
| 3 | Ben Gulbranson | 444 | 2025 | San Jose State |
| 4 | Steve Dils | 430 | 1978 | Washington State |
| 5 | Davis Mills | 428 | 2020 | UCLA |
| 6 | Andrew Luck | 423 | 2009 | Arizona |
| 7 | Todd Husak | 419 | 1998 | UCLA |
| 8 | John Elway | 418 | 1981 | Purdue |
| 9 | John Paye | 408 | 1985 | Oregon |
| | Steve Stenstrom | 408 | 1994 | UCLA |

=== Passing touchdowns ===
Career
| Rank | Player | TDs | Years |
|---|---|---|---|
| 1 | Andrew Luck | 82 | 2009 2010 2011 |
| 2 | John Elway | 77 | 1979 1980 1981 1982 |
| 3 | Kevin Hogan | 75 | 2012 2013 2014 2015 |
| 4 | Steve Stenstrom | 74 | 1991 1992 1993 1994 |
| 5 | Jim Plunkett | 53 | 1968 1969 1970 1971 |
| 6 | K. J. Costello | 49 | 2017 2018 2019 |
| 7 | Guy Benjamin | 48 | 1974 1975 1976 1977 |
| 8 | Todd Husak | 41 | 1996 1997 1998 1999 |
| 9 | John Paye | 38 | 1983 1984 1985 1986 |
| 10 | Trent Edwards | 36 | 2003 2004 2005 2006 |

Single season
| Rank | Player | TDs | Year |
|---|---|---|---|
| 1 | Andrew Luck | 37 | 2011 |
| 2 | Andrew Luck | 32 | 2010 |
| 3 | K. J. Costello | 29 | 2018 |
| 4 | John Elway | 27 | 1980 |
| | Steve Stenstrom | 27 | 1993 |
| | Kevin Hogan | 27 | 2015 |
| 7 | Steve Dils | 25 | 1978 |
| 8 | John Elway | 24 | 1982 |
| 9 | Guy Benjamin | 22 | 1977 |
| 10 | Jim Plunkett | 20 | 1969 |
| | John Elway | 20 | 1981 |
| | Kevin Hogan | 20 | 2013 |

Single game
| Rank | Player | TDs | Year | Opponent |
|---|---|---|---|---|
| 1 | John Elway | 6 | 1980 | Oregon State |
| 2 | Mike Boryla | 5 | 1973 | Washington State |
| | Steve Dils | 5 | 1978 | Washington State |
| | John Elway | 5 | 1980 | Washington State |
| | John Elway | 5 | 1982 | Oregon State |
| | Steve Stenstrom | 5 | 1993 | Colorado |
| | Joe Borchard | 5 | 1999 | UCLA |
| | Kevin Hogan | 5 | 2013 | California |
| | K. J. Costello | 5 | 2018 | UCLA |
| 10 | 29 times by 15 players | 4 | Most recent: Davis Warren, 2026 vs. NC State | |

== Rushing ==
=== Rushing yards ===
Career
| Rank | Player | Yards | Years |
|---|---|---|---|
| 1 | Stepfan Taylor | 4,300 | 2009 2010 2011 2012 |
| 2 | Darrin Nelson | 4,169 | 1977 1978 1980 1981 |
| 3 | Christian McCaffrey | 3,922 | 2014 2015 2016 |
| 4 | Bryce Love | 3,865 | 2015 2016 2017 2018 |
| 5 | Toby Gerhart | 3,522 | 2006 2007 2008 2009 |
| 6 | Brad Muster | 3,010 | 1984 1985 1986 1987 |
| 7 | Anthony Bookman | 2,672 | 1994 1995 1996 1997 |
| 8 | Mike Mitchell | 2,550 | 1993 1994 1995 1996 1997 |
| 9 | Tyler Gaffney | 2,500 | 2009 2010 2011 2013 |
| 10 | Glyn Milburn | 2,252 | 1990 1991 1992 |

Single season
| Rank | Player | Yards | Year |
|---|---|---|---|
| 1 | Bryce Love | 2,118 | 2017 |
| 2 | Christian McCaffrey | 2,019 | 2015 |
| 3 | Toby Gerhart | 1,871 | 2009 |
| 4 | Tyler Gaffney | 1,709 | 2013 |
| 5 | Christian McCaffrey | 1,603 | 2016 |
| 6 | Stepfan Taylor | 1,530 | 2012 |
| 7 | Stepfan Taylor | 1,330 | 2011 |
| 8 | Tommy Vardell | 1,188 | 1991 |
| 9 | Darrin Nelson | 1,161 | 1978 |
| 10 | Stepfan Taylor | 1,137 | 2010 |

Single game
| Rank | Player | Yards | Year | Opponent |
|---|---|---|---|---|
| 1 | Bryce Love | 301 | 2017 | Arizona State |
| 2 | Christian McCaffrey | 284 | 2016 | California |
| 3 | Bryce Love | 263 | 2017 | UCLA |
| 4 | Christian McCaffrey | 243 | 2015 | UCLA |
| 5 | Toby Gerhart | 223 | 2009 | Oregon |
| 6 | Jon Volpe | 220 | 1988 | Washington |
| 7 | Darrin Nelson | 211 | 1977 | San Jose State |
| 8 | Lou Valli | 209 | 1956 | California |
| 9 | Christian McCaffrey | 207 | 2015 | USC |
| 10 | Christian McCaffrey | 206 | 2015 | Oregon State |

=== Rushing touchdowns ===
Career
| Rank | Player | TDs | Years |
|---|---|---|---|
| 1 | Toby Gerhart | 44 | 2006 2007 2008 2009 |
| 2 | Stepfan Taylor | 40 | 2009 2010 2011 2012 |
| 3 | Tommy Vardell | 39 | 1988 1989 1990 1991 |
| 4 | Tyler Gaffney | 33 | 2009 2010 2011 2013 |
| 5 | Bryce Love | 30 | 2015 2016 2017 2018 |
| 6 | Brad Muster | 28 | 1984 1985 1986 1987 |
| 7 | Remound Wright | 26 | 2012 2013 2014 2015 |
| 8 | Darrin Nelson | 24 | 1977 1978 1980 1981 |
| | Kerry Carter | 24 | 1999 2000 2001 2002 |
| | Cameron Scarlett | 24 | 2016 2017 2018 2019 |

Single season
| Rank | Player | TDs | Year |
|---|---|---|---|
| 1 | Toby Gerhart | 28 | 2009 |
| 2 | Tommy Vardell | 22 | 1991 |
| 3 | Tyler Gaffney | 21 | 2013 |
| 4 | Bryce Love | 19 | 2017 |
| 5 | Toby Gerhart | 15 | 2008 |
| | Stepfan Taylor | 15 | 2010 |
| 7 | Tommy Vardell | 14 | 1990 |
| 8 | Brad Muster | 13 | 1986 |
| 9 | Stepfan Taylor | 13 | 2012 |
| | Christian McCaffrey | 13 | 2016 |
| | Remound Wright | 13 | 2015 |

Single game
| Rank | Player | TDs | Year | Opponent |
|---|---|---|---|---|
| 1 | Darrin Nelson | 4 | 1981 | Oregon State |
| | Tommy Vardell | 4 | 1990 | Notre Dame |
| | Kerry Carter | 4 | 2000 | USC |
| | Kerry Carter | 4 | 2001 | Oregon |
| | Toby Gerhart | 4 | 2008 | Washington State |
| | Toby Gerhart | 4 | 2009 | California |
| | Stepfan Taylor | 4 | 2010 | Arizona |
| | Remound Wright | 4 | 2014 | California |
| | Christian McCaffrey | 4 | 2015 | UCLA |
| | Micah Ford | 4 | 2026 | Elon |

== Receiving ==
=== Receptions ===
Career
| Rank | Player | Rec | Years |
|---|---|---|---|
| 1 | Troy Walters | 248 | 1996 1997 1998 1999 |
| 2 | DeRonnie Pitts | 228 | 1997 1998 1999 2000 |
| 3 | Darrin Nelson | 223 | 1977 1978 1980 1981 |
| 4 | Brad Muster | 198 | 1984 1985 1986 1987 |
| 5 | Ty Montgomery | 172 | 2011 2012 2013 2014 |
| 6 | Mark Bradford | 169 | 2003 2004 2005 2006 |
| 7 | Vincent White | 162 | 1979 1980 1981 1982 |
| 8 | Jeff James | 158 | 1984 1985 1986 1987 |
| 9 | Justin Armour | 156 | 1991 1992 1993 1994 |
| 10 | Ken Margerum | 146 | 1977 1978 1979 1980 |
| | Ed McCaffrey | 146 | 1986 1987 1989 1990 |
| | Chris Walsh | 146 | 1988 1989 1990 1991 |
| | Glyn Milburn | 146 | 1990 1991 1992 |
| | Brian Manning | 146 | 1993 1994 1995 1996 |

Single season
| Rank | Player | Rec | Year |
|---|---|---|---|
| 1 | Troy Walters | 86 | 1997 |
| 2 | Brad Muster | 78 | 1985 |
| 3 | Troy Walters | 77 | 1999 |
| | DeRonnie Pitts | 77 | 2000 |
| 5 | DeRonnie Pitts | 74 | 1998 |
| 6 | Gene Washington | 71 | 1968 |
| | Chris Walsh | 71 | 1991 |
| 8 | Zach Ertz | 69 | 2012 |
| 9 | Vincent White | 68 | 1982 |
| 10 | Darrin Nelson | 67 | 1981 |
| | Justin Armour | 67 | 1994 |

Single game
| Rank | Player | Rec | Year | Opponent |
|---|---|---|---|---|
| 1 | Simi Fehoko | 16 | 2020 | UCLA |
| 2 | Eric Cross | 14 | 1972 | Hawai’i |
| | Vincent White | 14 | 1982 | UCLA |
| | Brad Muster | 14 | 1985 | Oregon |
| | Jim Price | 14 | 1989 | Notre Dame |
| 6 | Gene Washington | 13 | 1968 | UCLA |
| | Darrin Nelson | 13 | 1981 | Ohio State |
| | Troy Walters | 13 | 1997 | Oregon |
| | DeRonnie Pitts | 13 | 2000 | USC |
| | Elic Ayomanor | 13 | 2023 | Colorado |
| | Emmett Mosley V | 13 | 2024 | Louisville |

=== Receiving yards ===
Career
| Rank | Player | Yards | Years |
|---|---|---|---|
| 1 | Troy Walters | 4,047 | 1996 1997 1998 1999 |
| 2 | DeRonnie Pitts | 3,023 | 1997 1998 1999 2000 |
| 3 | Ken Margerum | 2,517 | 1977 1978 1979 1980 |
| 4 | Justin Armour | 2,491 | 1991 1992 1993 1994 |
| 5 | Darrin Nelson | 2,469 | 1977 1978 1980 1981 |
| 6 | Mark Bradford | 2,431 | 2003 2004 2005 2006 2007 |
| 7 | Brian Manning | 2,365 | 1993 1994 1995 1996 |
| 8 | Ed McCaffrey | 2,333 | 1986 1987 1989 1990 |
| 9 | Jeff James | 2,306 | 1984 1985 1986 1987 |
| 10 | Emile Harry | 2,270 | 1981 1982 1983 1984 |

Single season
| Rank | Player | Yards | Year |
|---|---|---|---|
| 1 | Troy Walters | 1,508 | 1999 |
| 2 | Troy Walters | 1,206 | 1997 |
| 3 | Gene Washington | 1,117 | 1968 |
| 4 | Justin Armour | 1,092 | 1994 |
| 5 | J. J. Arcega-Whiteside | 1,059 | 2018 |
| 6 | Ken Margerum | 1,029 | 1978 |
| 7 | Mark Harris | 1,021 | 1995 |
| 8 | Elic Ayomanor | 1,013 | 2023 |
| 9 | DeRonnie Pitts | 1,012 | 1998 |
| 10 | James Lofton | 1,010 | 1977 |

Single game
| Rank | Player | Yards | Year | Opponent |
|---|---|---|---|---|
| 1 | Elic Ayomanor | 294 | 2023 | Colorado |
| 2 | Troy Walters | 278 | 1999 | UCLA |
| 3 | Darrin Nelson | 237 | 1981 | Arizona State |
| 4 | Simi Fehoko | 230 | 2020 | UCLA |
| 5 | J. J. Arcega-Whiteside | 226 | 2018 | San Diego State |
| 6 | Justin Armour | 220 | 1994 | UCLA |
| 7 | Troy Walters | 209 | 1997 | USC |
| 8 | Troy Walters | 192 | 1998 | UCLA |
| | James Lofton | 192 | 1977 | Washington |
| 10 | Mark Harris | 189 | 1993 | Oregon |

=== Receiving touchdowns ===
Career
| Rank | Player | TDs | Years |
|---|---|---|---|
| 1 | Ken Margerum | 32 | 1977 1978 1979 1980 |
| 2 | J. J. Arcega-Whiteside | 28 | 2016 2017 2018 |
| 3 | Troy Walters | 26 | 1996 1997 1998 1999 |
| 4 | DeRonnie Pitts | 24 | 1997 1998 1999 2000 |
| 5 | Justin Armour | 20 | 1991 1992 1993 1994 |
| 6 | Tony Hill | 18 | 1973 1974 1975 1976 |
| | Vincent White | 18 | 1979 1980 1981 1982 |
| | Coby Fleener | 18 | 2008 2009 2010 2011 |
| | James Lofton | 18 | 1975 1976 1977 |
| | Darrin Nelson | 18 | 1977 1978 1980 1981 |

Single season
| Rank | Player | TDs | Year |
|---|---|---|---|
| 1 | James Lofton | 14 | 1977 |
| | J. J. Arcega-Whiteside | 14 | 2018 |
| 3 | Ken Margerum | 11 | 1978 |
| | Ken Margerum | 11 | 1980 |
| 5 | Ken Margerum | 10 | 1979 |
| | Troy Walters | 10 | 1999 |
| | Coby Fleener | 10 | 2011 |
| | Ty Montgomery | 10 | 2013 |
| 9 | Eric Cross | 9 | 1972 |
| | Doug Baldwin | 9 | 2010 |
| | J. J. Arcega-Whiteside | 9 | 2017 |

Single game
| Rank | Player | TDs | Year | Opponent |
|---|---|---|---|---|
| 1 | Ken Margerum | 4 | 1980 | Oregon State |
| | Ty Montgomery | 4 | 2013 | California |

== Total offense ==
Total offense is the sum of passing and rushing statistics. It does not include receiving or returns.

=== Total offense yards ===
Career
| Rank | Player | Yards | Years |
|---|---|---|---|
| 1 | Kevin Hogan | 10,634 | 2012 2013 2014 2015 |
| 2 | Andrew Luck | 10,387 | 2009 2010 2011 |
| 3 | Steve Stenstrom | 10,179 | 1991 1992 1993 1994 |
| 4 | John Elway | 9,070 | 1979 1980 1981 1982 |
| 5 | Jim Plunkett | 8,178 | 1968 1969 1970 |
| 6 | John Paye | 7,539 | 1983 1984 1985 1986 |
| 7 | Todd Husak | 6,680 | 1996 1997 1998 1999 |
| 8 | K. J. Costello | 6,241 | 2017 2018 2019 |
| 9 | Guy Benjamin | 6,043 | 1974 1975 1976 1977 |
| 10 | Trent Edwards | 5,642 | 2003 2004 2005 2006 |

Single season
| Rank | Player | Yards | Year |
|---|---|---|---|
| 1 | Andrew Luck | 3,791 | 2010 |
| 2 | Andrew Luck | 3,667 | 2011 |
| 3 | Steve Stenstrom | 3,398 | 1993 |
| 4 | Kevin Hogan | 3,203 | 2015 |
| 5 | Jim Plunkett | 3,189 | 1970 |
| 6 | John Elway | 3,104 | 1982 |
| 7 | Kevin Hogan | 3,087 | 2014 |
| 8 | Steve Dils | 3,033 | 1978 |
| 9 | Todd Husak | 3,026 | 1998 |
| 10 | Kevin Hogan | 2,985 | 2013 |

Single game
| Rank | Player | Yards | Year | Opponent |
|---|---|---|---|---|
| 1 | Davis Mills | 491 | 2019 | Washington State |
| 2 | Ashton Daniels | 448 | 2023 | Washington |
| 3 | Todd Husak | 447 | 1998 | Oregon State |
| 4 | Andrew Luck | 443 | 2009 | Arizona |
| 5 | Davis Mills | 440 | 2020 | UCLA |
| 6 | Steve Dils | 438 | 1978 | Washington State |
| 7 | Ashton Daniels | 435 | 2023 | Colorado |
| 8 | Todd Husak | 428 | 1998 | UCLA |
| 9 | John Elway | 418 | 1982 | Ohio State |
| | John Paye | 418 | 1985 | San Diego State |

=== Total touchdowns ===
Career
| Rank | Player | TDs | Years |
|---|---|---|---|
| 1 | Kevin Hogan | 90 | 2012 2013 2014 2015 |
| 2 | Andrew Luck | 89 | 2009 2010 2011 |
| 3 | John Elway | 82 | 1979 1980 1981 1982 |
| 4 | Steve Stenstrom | 77 | 1991 1992 1993 1994 |
| 5 | Jim Plunkett | 63 | 1968 1969 1970 |
| 6 | Guy Benjamin | 55 | 1974 1975 1976 1977 |
| 7 | K. J. Costello | 52 | 2017 2018 2019 |
| 8 | John Paye | 47 | 1983 1984 1985 1986 |
| 9 | Toby Gerhart | 45 | 2006 2007 2008 2009 |
| 10 | Todd Husak | 44 | 1996 1997 1998 1999 |

Single season
| Rank | Player | TDs | Year |
|---|---|---|---|
| 1 | Andrew Luck | 39 | 2011 |
| 2 | Andrew Luck | 35 | 2010 |
| 3 | Kevin Hogan | 33 | 2015 |
| 4 | John Elway | 31 | 1980 |
| 5 | Toby Gerhart | 29 | 2009 |
| 6 | Steve Stenstrom | 27 | 1993 |
| 7 | Steve Dils | 26 | 1978 |
| 8 | Guy Benjamin | 24 | 1977 |
| 9 | John Elway | 24 | 1982 |
| 10 | Kevin Hogan | 24 | 2014 |

Single game
| Rank | Player | TDs | Year | Opponent |
|---|---|---|---|---|
| 1 | John Elway | 6 | 1980 | Washington State |
| | John Elway | 6 | 1980 | Oregon State |

== All-purpose yardage ==
All-purpose yardage is the sum of all yards credited to a player who is in possession of the ball. It includes rushing, receiving, and returns, but does not include passing.

Statistics are from the 2018 Stanford football record book, and will be updated if necessary to reflect results from the 2018 season. The record book lists only the top six single-game performers.

Career
| Rk | Player | Yards | Years |
|---|---|---|---|
| 1 | Darrin Nelson | 7,120 | 1977 1978 1980 1981 |
| 2 | Christian McCaffrey | 6,987 | 2014 2015 2016 |
| 3 | Glyn Milburn | 6,146 | 1990 1991 1992 |
| 4 | Troy Walters | 5,515 | 1996 1997 1998 1999 |
| 5 | Ty Montgomery | 5,190 | 2011 2012 2013 2014 |
| 6 | Stepfan Taylor | 5,095 | 2009 2010 2011 2012 |
| 7 | Brad Muster | 5,095 | 1984 1985 1986 1987 |
| 8 | Vincent White | 4,662 | 1979 1980 1981 1982 |
| 9 | Anthony Bookman | 4,072 | 1994 1995 1996 1997 |
| 10 | Toby Gerhart | 3,917 | 2006 2007 2008 2009 |

Single season
| Rk | Player | Yards | Year |
|---|---|---|---|
| 1 | Christian McCaffrey | 3,864 | 2015 |
| 2 | Christian McCaffrey | 2,327 | 2016 |
| 3 | Glyn Milburn | 2,234 | 1992 |
| 4 | Glyn Milburn | 2,222 | 1990 |
| 5 | Ty Montgomery | 2,208 | 2013 |
| 6 | Bryce Love | 2,151 | 2017 |
| 7 | Toby Gerhart | 2,028 | 2009 |
| 8 | Darrin Nelson | 1,998 | 1981 |
| 9 | Troy Walters | 1,929 | 1999 |
| 10 | Chris Owusu | 1,915 | 2009 |

Single game
| Rk | Player | Yards | Year | Opponent |
|---|---|---|---|---|
| 1 | Christian McCaffrey | 461 | 2015 | USC |
| 2 | Christian McCaffrey | 389 | 2015 | California |
| 3 | Glyn Milburn | 379 | 1990 | California |
| 4 | Christian McCaffrey | 369 | 2015 | UCLA |
| | Darrin Nelson | 369 | 1980 | Washington State |
| 6 | Christian McCaffrey | 368 | 2016 | Iowa (Rose Bowl) |

== Defense ==
=== Interceptions ===
Career
| Rank | Player | Ints | Years |
|---|---|---|---|
| 1 | Phil Moffatt | 20 | 1929 1930 1931 |
| 2 | Toi Cook | 17 | 1983 1984 1985 1986 |
| 3 | Tim Smith | 16 | 1996 1997 1998 1999 |
| 4 | Brad Humphreys | 14 | 1985 1986 1987 |
| 5 | Dick Ragsdale | 11 | 1962 1963 1964 |
| | Leroy Pruitt | 11 | 1993 1994 1995 1996 |
| 7 | John Guillory | 10 | 1964 1965 1966 |
| | Vaughn Bryant | 10 | 1990 1991 1992 1993 |
| | Bo McNally | 10 | 2006 2007 2008 2009 |

Single season
| Rank | Player | Ints | Year |
|---|---|---|---|
| 1 | Phil Moffatt | 9 | 1930 |
| | Bobby Garrett | 9 | 1953 |
| 3 | Phil Moffatt | 8 | 1929 |
| | Benny Barnes | 8 | 1971 |
| | Toi Cook | 8 | 1986 |
| 6 | Jim Kaffen | 7 | 1972 |
| | Dallas Lloyd | 7 | 2016 |
| 8 | Steve Murray | 6 | 1972 |
| | Brad Humphreys | 6 | 1987 |
| | Vaughn Bryant | 6 | 1992 |
| | Tim Smith | 6 | 1998 |
| | Tim Smith | 6 | 1999 |
| | Ed Reynolds | 6 | 2012 |

Single game
| Rank | Player | Ints | Year | Opponent |
|---|---|---|---|---|
| 1 | Bobby Grayson | 4 | 1934 | Washington |
| 2 | Tim Smith | 3 | 1999 | Arizona |
| | Tim Smith | 3 | 1998 | Washington State |
| | Leroy Pruitt | 3 | 1994 | Northwestern |
| | Toi Cook | 3 | 1986 | San Jose State |
| | Benny Barnes | 3 | 1971 | Washington |

=== Tackles ===
Career
| Rank | Player | Tackles | Years |
|---|---|---|---|
| 1 | Gordy Ceresino | 571 | 1975 1976 1977 1978 |
| 2 | Dave Wyman | 462 | 1982 1983 1984 1986 |
| 3 | Jono Tunney | 430 | 1987 1988 1989 1990 |
| 4 | Matt Soderlund | 394 | 1982 1983 1984 1985 |
| 5 | Don Parish | 355 | 1967 1968 1969 |
| 6 | Shayne Skov | 353 | 2009 2010 2011 2012 2013 |
| 7 | Chuck Evans | 348 | 1976 1977 1978 1979 |
| 8 | Duncan McColl | 347 | 1974 1975 1976 |
| 9 | Chris Draft | 332 | 1994 1995 1996 1997 |
| 10 | Pat Preston | 309 | 1967 1968 1969 |

Single season
| Rank | Player | Tackles | Year |
|---|---|---|---|
| 1 | Gordy Ceresino | 196 | 1977 |
| 2 | Dave Wyman | 173 | 1986 |
| 3 | Gordy Ceresino | 167 | 1978 |
| 4 | Jim Merlo | 164 | 1972 |
| 5 | Gordy Ceresino | 159 | 1976 |
| 6 | Jono Tunney | 155 | 1988 |
| 7 | Drew Palin | 154 | 1974 |
| 8 | Gordon Riegel | 150 | 1974 |
| 9 | Dave Wyman | 144 | 1983 |
| 10 | Don Parish | 143 | 1968 |

Single game
| Rank | Player | Tackles | Year | Opponent |
|---|---|---|---|---|
| 1 | Dave Wyman | 27 | 1986 | California |
| 2 | Don Parish | 23 | 1968 | Oregon State |
| | Don Parish | 23 | 1969 | USC |
| 4 | Pat Preston | 22 | 1968 | Washington State |
| | Gordy Ceresino | 22 | 1977 | LSU |
| 6 | Gordon Riegel | 21 | 1972 | Washington State |
| 7 | Dave Wyman | 20 | 1986 | Washington |
| | Pat Moore | 20 | 1972 | Washington State |
| | Jim Merlo | 20 | 1972 | Oregon State |
| | Jim Merlo | 20 | 1972 | Washington State |
| | Gordy Ceresino | 20 | 1978 | Georgia |

=== Sacks ===
Career
| Rank | Player | Sacks | Years |
|---|---|---|---|
| 1 | Riall Johnson | 36.0 | 1997 1998 1999 2000 |
| 2 | Ron George | 33.0 | 1990 1991 1992 |
| 3 | Trent Murphy | 32.5 | 2010 2011 2012 2013 |
| 4 | Kailee Wong | 28.0 | 1994 1995 1996 1997 |
| 5 | Chase Thomas | 27.5 | 2009 2010 2011 2012 |
| 6 | Duncan McColl | 25.0 | 1974 1975 1976 |
| | Garin Veris | 25.0 | 1981 1982 1983 1984 |
| 8 | Willie Howard | 22.5 | 1997 1998 1999 2000 |
| 9 | Carl Hansen | 21.5 | 1994 1995 1996 1997 |
| | Jon Alston | 21.5 | 2002 2003 2004 2005 |

Single season
| Rank | Player | Sacks | Year |
|---|---|---|---|
| 1 | Duncan McColl | 17.0 | 1976 |
| 2 | Ron George | 15.0 | 1992 |
| | Riall Johnson | 15.0 | 2000 |
| | Trent Murphy | 15.0 | 2013 |
| 5 | Kailee Wong | 14.0 | 1996 |
| | Riall Johnson | 14.0 | 1999 |
| 7 | Rob Hinckley | 13.0 | 1988 |
| 8 | Kailee Wong | 12.0 | 1997 |
| 9 | Ron George | 10.0 | 1990 |
| | Willie Howard | 10.0 | 1999 |
| | Jon Alston | 10.0 | 2004 |
| | Trent Murphy | 10.0 | 2012 |

Single game
| Rank | Player | Sacks | Year | Opponent |
|---|---|---|---|---|
| 1 | Riall Johnson | 5.0 | 1999 | Washington State |

== Kicking ==
=== Field goals made ===
Career
| Rank | Player | FGs | Years |
|---|---|---|---|
| 1 | Jordan Williamson | 63 | 2011 2012 2013 2014 |
| 2 | John Hopkins | 59 | 1987 1988 1989 1990 |
| 3 | Jet Toner | 54 | 2017 2018 2019 2020 |
| 4 | Eric Abrams | 53 | 1992 1993 1994 1995 |
| 5 | Joshua Karty | 51 | 2021 2022 2023 |
| 6 | Mark Harmon | 50 | 1981 1982 1983 1984 |
| 7 | Michael Sgroi | 47 | 2002 2003 2004 2005 |
| 8 | Rod Garcia | 44 | 1971 1972 1973 |
| 9 | Conrad Ukropina | 42 | 2013 2014 2015 2016 |
| 10 | Ken Naber | 41 | 1977 1978 1979 1980 |

Single season
| Rank | Player | FGs | Year |
|---|---|---|---|
| 1 | Joshua Karty | 23 | 2023 |
| 2 | Conrad Ukropina | 22 | 2016 |
| 3 | Jet Toner | 21 | 2017 |
| 4 | John Hopkins | 19 | 1988 |
| 5 | Rod Garcia | 18 | 1973 |
| | John Hopkins | 18 | 1989 |
| | Jordan Williamson | 18 | 2013 |
| | Conrad Ukropina | 18 | 2015 |
| | Joshua Karty | 18 | 2022 |
| 10 | Eric Abrams | 17 | 1992 |
| | Nate Whitaker | 17 | 2010 |
| | Jordan Williamson | 17 | 2012 |

Single game
| Rank | Player | FGs | Year | Opponent |
|---|---|---|---|---|
| 1 | John Hopkins | 5 | 1990 | California |
| | Nate Whitaker | 5 | 2010 | Notre Dame |
| | Joshua Karty | 5 | 2022 | Arizona State |

=== Field goal percentage ===
Career
| Rank | Player | FG% | Years |
|---|---|---|---|
| 1 | Joshua Karty | 85.0% | 2021 2022 2023 |
| 2 | Conrad Ukropina | 82.4% | 2013 2014 2015 2016 |
| 3 | Nate Whitaker | 80.5% | 2009 2010 |
| 4 | Jet Toner | 79.4% | 2017 2018 2019 2020 |
| 5 | Emmet Kenney | 78.9% | 2021 2022 2023 2024 2025 |
| 6 | Aaron Zagory | 73.3% | 2005 2006 2007 2008 |
| 7 | Mark Harmon | 71.4% | 1981 1982 1983 1984 |
| 8 | Jordan Williamson | 70.0% | 2011 2012 2013 2014 |
| 9 | Eric Abrams | 69.7% | 1992 1993 1994 1995 |
| 10 | Mike Biselli | 69.4% | 1998 1999 2000 2001 |

Single season
| Rank | Player | FG% | Year |
|---|---|---|---|
| 1 | Joshua Karty | 100.0% | 2022 |
| 2 | Jet Toner | 93.3% | 2018 |
| 3 | Conrad Ukropina | 90.0% | 2015 |
| 4 | Nate Whitaker | 89.5% | 2010 |
| 5 | Mark Harmon | 85.7% | 1981 |
| 6 | Joshua Karty | 85.2% | 2023 |
| 7 | Eric Abrams | 84.2% | 1995 |
| 8 | Aaron Zagory | 82.4% | 2008 |
| | Emmet Kenney | 82.4% | 2024 |
| 10 | Jordan Williamson | 81.8% | 2013 |
