= 1993 Blockbuster Bowl =

American college football game

Stanford Cardinal	Penn State Nittany Lions
(9–3)	(7–4)
Pac-10	Independent
24	3
Head coach: Bill Walsh	Head coach: Joe Paterno
AP / Coaches / BC; 13 / 13 / 13	AP / Coaches / BC; 21 / 21 / 21
	1	2	3	4	Total
Stanford	7	7	10	0	24
Penn State	3	0	0	0	3
- Date: January 1, 1993
- Season: 1992
- Stadium: Joe Robbie Stadium
- Location: Miami Gardens, Florida
- MVP: Darrien Gordon (CB), Stanford
- Attendance: 45,554

United States TV coverage
- Network: CBS
- Announcers: Jim Nantz (Play-by-Play); Randy Cross (Analyst)

The 1993 Blockbuster Bowl game was a post-season college football bowl game between the Stanford Cardinal and the Penn State Nittany Lions played on January 1, 1993, at Joe Robbie Stadium in Miami Gardens, Florida. It was the third edition of the bowl game, and a Bowl Coalition game.

The legendary status of both head coaches was the pregame focus—Penn State's Joe Paterno was attempting to get his 15th bowl game win, and Stanford's Bill Walsh had won three Super Bowls with the San Francisco 49ers—but the game itself was dominated by Stanford, which scored on its first possession and led the entire game, winning 24–3.

== Teams ==
=== Stanford ===
Stanford was led by head coach Bill Walsh, who was in the first year of his second stint as Stanford's coach. He had coached Stanford from 1977 to 1978, leading the team to bowl games in each season; then departed to coach the NFL's San Francisco 49ers, where he turned the team into a dynasty, winning three Super Bowls in the 1980s. After a career as a television football analyst, Walsh chose to come back as Stanford's head coach, stating, "This is my bliss."

On the field, Stanford was led by quarterback Steve Stenstrom, who had thrown for 2,399 yards and 14 touchdowns on the year, and tailback Glyn Milburn, who led the team with 851 yards rushing and eight touchdowns and had returned three punts for touchdowns.

=== Penn State ===
Head coach Joe Paterno was making his 23rd bowl game appearance in his 27th year at Penn State. Offensively, the team relied upon wide receiver O. J. McDuffie, who had 63 pass receptions for 977 yards and nine touchdowns during the season; and running back Richie Anderson, who ran for 900 yards and 18 touchdowns.

== Game summary ==
On its first possession, Stanford drove 71 yards on eight plays and scored on a two-yard pass from Steve Stenstrom to Ryan Wetnight. Penn State answered with a drive that ended with a 33-yard field goal from V. J. Muscillo. Stanford added another touchdown before the half on a five-yard run from J. J. Lasley to extend the Cardinal lead to 14–3.

In the second half, after an Eric Abrams field goal, Stenstrom added another touchdown completion with a short pass to Milburn, who ran 40 yards for the score, to end the day with 210 passing yards and two touchdowns. On defense, the Cardinal held the Nittany Lions scoreless after the first quarter, and limited them to just 82 offensive yards in the second half. Cornerback Darrien Gordon was named the game's MVP after breaking up six passes, making seven tackles, and holding receiver McDuffie in check.

=== Scoring ===
==== First quarter ====
- Stanford – Ryan Wetnight 2-yard pass from Steve Stenstrom (Eric Abrams kick)
- Penn State – V. J. Muscillo 33-yard field goal

==== Second quarter ====
- Stanford – J. J. Lasley 5-yard run (Abrams kick)

==== Third quarter ====
- Stanford – Abrams 28-yard field goal
- Stanford – Glyn Milburn 40-yard pass from Stenstrom (Abrams kick)

==== Fourth quarter ====
No scoring.

== Aftermath ==
Walsh coached two more seasons at Stanford, both with losing records. He retired from coaching for good in 1995 and died of leukemia in 2007. Cornerback Gordon played nine seasons in the NFL and played in four Super Bowls, including Super Bowl XXIX at Joe Robbie Stadium two years later. Tailback Milburn played eight NFL seasons and made the Pro Bowl twice. Quarterback Stenstrom played five NFL seasons. John Lynch, who anchored Stanford's defense at strong safety, was a nine-time Pro Bowl selection, a Super Bowl XXXVII champion, and is a member of the Pro Football Hall of Fame.

Paterno would remain as Penn State's coach until 2011, winning many more bowl games, including the 2006 Orange Bowl in the same stadium, renamed Dolphin Stadium by that time. He was fired with three games left in the 2011 season due to the Jerry Sandusky child sex abuse scandal, having previously announced his intent to retire at the end of the season; he died shortly afterward from complications of lung cancer. Receiver McDuffie went on to a successful eight-year career with the Miami Dolphins and Richie Anderson was a Pro Bowler for the New York Jets.

The Blockbuster Bowl would go through several name changes and currently exists as the Pop-Tarts Bowl. The game moved from South Florida to Orlando in 2001.
