= Don Parish =

Don Parish may refer to:

- Don Parish (American football) (1948–2018), American football linebacker
- Don Parish (rugby league) (born 1937), rugby league player and coach
