= 1987 Stanford Cardinal football team =

American college football season

1987 Stanford Cardinal football
- Conference: Pacific-10 Conference
- Record: 5–6 (4–4 Pac-10)
- Head coach: Jack Elway (4th season)
- Offensive scheme: West Coast
- Defensive coordinator: Dick Mannini (4th season)
- Base defense: 4–3
- Home stadium: Stanford Stadium

1987 Pacific-10 Conference football standings
	Conf.					Overall
Team	W		L		T	W		L		T
No. 9 UCLA +	7	–	1	–	0	10	–	2	–	0
No. 18 USC +	7	–	1	–	0	8	–	4	–	0
Washington	4	–	3	–	1	7	–	4	–	1
No. 20 Arizona State	3	–	3	–	1	7	–	4	–	1
Oregon	4	–	4	–	0	6	–	5	–	0
Stanford	4	–	4	–	0	5	–	6	–	0
Arizona	2	–	3	–	3	4	–	4	–	3
California	2	–	3	–	2	3	–	6	–	2
Washington State	1	–	5	–	1	3	–	7	–	1
Oregon State	0	–	7	–	0	2	–	9	–	0
+ – Conference co-champions; Rankings from AP Poll

The 1987 Stanford Cardinal football team represented Stanford University as a member of the Pacific-10 Conference (Pac-10) during the 1987 NCAA Division I-A football season. Led by fourth-year head coach Jack Elway, the Cardinal compiled an overall record of 5–6 with a mark of 4–4 in conference play, tying for fifth place in the Pac-10. The team played home games at Stanford Stadium in Stanford, California.

== Schedule ==
Date	Opponent	Site	TV	Result	Attendance	Source
September 5	at No. 13 Washington	Husky Stadium; Seattle, WA		L 21–31	73,676	
September 19	at Colorado*	Folsom Field; Boulder, CO	KCNC	L 17–31	45,073	
September 26	San Jose State*	Stanford Stadium; Stanford, CA (rivalry)		L 17–24	67,500	
October 3	No. 11 UCLA	Stanford Stadium; Stanford, CA (rivalry)	ABC	L 0–49	57,500	
October 10	at Washington State	Martin Stadium; Pullman, WA		W 44–7	31,538	
October 17	at San Diego State*	Jack Murphy Stadium; San Diego, CA		W 44–40	25,676	
October 24	Oregon	Stanford Stadium; Stanford, CA (rivalry)		W 13–10	38,500	
October 31	Arizona	Stanford Stadium; Stanford, CA		L 13–23	34,000	
November 7	at USC	Los Angeles Memorial Coliseum; Los Angeles, CA (rivalry)	ABC	L 24–39	58,922	
November 14	at Oregon State	Parker Stadium; Corvallis, OR		W 38–7	15,751	
November 21	California	Stanford Stadium; Stanford, CA (90th Big Game)		W 31–7	85,000	
*Non-conference game; Rankings from AP Poll released prior to the game

== Roster ==
1987 Stanford Cardinal football team roster
Players
Coaches
Offense

Pos.	#	Name	Class
QB	5	Brian Johnson	So
QB	10	Greg Ennis	Sr
FB	34	Scott Eschelman	Jr
G	62	Chuck Gillingham	So
WR	3	Jeff James	Sr
G	67	John Mahoney	Sr
WR	40	Ed McCaffrey	So
RB	25	Brad Muster	Sr
G	55	Dan Nash	So
QB	12	Jason Palumbis	Fr
G	56	Andy Papathanassiou	Jr
TE	87	Jim Price	Jr
C	54	Andy Sinclair	Sr
OT	63	Jon Summers	Sr
FB	44	Tommy Vardell	Fr
WR	80	Chris Walsh	Fr
OT	73	John Zentner	Sr

Defense

Pos.	#	Name	Class
DT	72	Lester Archambeau	Jr
LB	50	Kurt Colehower	Sr
CB	18	Brad Cook	Jr
CB	2	Alan Grant	Jr
LB	43	Rob Hinkley	Jr
DB	22	Brad Humphreys	Sr
DL	53	Ray Huckestein	Jr
CB	42	Pat Kelly	Sr
LB	86	Barry McKeever	Sr
LB	90	Kevin Mescher	So
FS	23	Bruce Richardson	Sr
LB	46	Kevin Richardson	Sr
DT	99	Sean Scheller	Sr
CB	36	Kevin Scott	Fr
LB	95	Jono Tunney	Fr
DB		Tuan Van Le	Fr

Special teams

Pos.	#	Name	Class
P	48	Doug Robison	Sr

Head coach

- Jack Elway

Coordinators/assistant coaches

- Jimmy Walsh – Running backs
- Dave Baldwin – Wide receivers
- Gary Gagnon – Tight ends and offensive line
- Otto Kofler – Offensive line and tight ends
- Dick Mannini – Defensive coordinator and defensive line
- Larry Kerr – Inside linebackers
- Gary Gilmete – Outside linebackers
- Sonny Lubick – Defensive backs

Legend

- (C) Team captain
- (S) Suspended
- (I) Ineligible
- Injured
- Redshirt
