= 1987 UCLA Bruins football team =

American college football season

1987 UCLA Bruins football

Pac-10 co-champion Aloha Bowl champion

Aloha Bowl, W 20–16 vs. Florida
- Conference: Pacific-10 Conference

Ranking
- Coaches: No. 11
- AP: No. 9
- Record: 10–2 (7–1 Pac-10)
- Head coach: Terry Donahue (12th season)
- Offensive coordinator: Steve Axman (1st season)
- Co-defensive coordinators: Bob Field (6th season); Tom Hayes (6th season)
- Home stadium: Rose Bowl

1987 Pacific-10 Conference football standings
	Conf.					Overall
Team	W		L		T	W		L		T
No. 9 UCLA +	7	–	1	–	0	10	–	2	–	0
No. 18 USC +	7	–	1	–	0	8	–	4	–	0
Washington	4	–	3	–	1	7	–	4	–	1
No. 20 Arizona State	3	–	3	–	1	7	–	4	–	1
Oregon	4	–	4	–	0	6	–	5	–	0
Stanford	4	–	4	–	0	5	–	6	–	0
Arizona	2	–	3	–	3	4	–	4	–	3
California	2	–	3	–	2	3	–	6	–	2
Washington State	1	–	5	–	1	3	–	7	–	1
Oregon State	0	–	7	–	0	2	–	9	–	0
+ – Conference co-champions; Rankings from AP Poll

The 1987 UCLA Bruins football team was an American football team that represented the University of California, Los Angeles during the 1987 NCAA Division I-A football season. In their 12th year under head coach Terry Donahue, the Bruins compiled a 10–2 record (7–1 Pac-10), finished in a tie for first place in the Pacific-10 Conference, and were ranked No. 9 in the final AP poll. The team's two losses were against No. 2-ranked Nebraska and USC. The Bruins went on to defeat Florida in the 1987 Aloha Bowl.

UCLA's offensive leaders in 1987 were quarterback Troy Aikman with 2,527 passing yards, running back Gaston Green with 1,098 rushing yards, and wide receiver Flipper Anderson with 903 receiving yards.

== Schedule ==
Date	Opponent	Rank	Site	TV	Result	Attendance	Source
September 5	San Diego State*	No. 3	Rose Bowl; Pasadena, CA	PPV	W 47–14	54,287	
September 12	at No. 2 Nebraska*	No. 3	Memorial Stadium; Lincoln, NE	ESPN	L 33–42	76,313	
September 19	Fresno State*	No. 13	Rose Bowl; Pasadena, CA		W 17–0	49,264	
September 26	Arizona	No. 13	Rose Bowl; Pasadena, CA		W 34–24	55,823	
October 3	at Stanford	No. 11	Stanford Stadium; Stanford, CA (rivalry)	ABC	W 49–0	57,500	
October 17	No. 16 Oregon	No. 9	Rose Bowl; Pasadena, CA	PPV	W 41–10	53,320	
October 24	California	No. 8	Rose Bowl; Pasadena, CA (rivalry)	ABC	W 42–18	51,107	
October 31	at Arizona State	No. 7	Sun Devil Stadium; Tempe, AZ	ABC	W 31–23	70,754	
November 7	at Oregon State	No. 7	Parker Stadium; Corvallis, OR		W 52–17	20,104	
November 14	Washington	No. 5	Rose Bowl; Pasadena, CA	ABC	W 47–14	70,332	
November 21	at USC	No. 5	Los Angeles Memorial Coliseum; Los Angeles, CA (Victory Bell)	ABC	L 13–17	92,516	
December 25	vs. Florida*	No. 10	Aloha Stadium; Halawa, HI (Aloha Bowl)	ABC	W 20–16	24,839	
*Non-conference game; Rankings from AP Poll released prior to the game

== Rankings ==
Ranking movements Legend: ██ Increase in ranking ██ Decrease in ranking т = Tied with team above or below ( ) = First-place votes
	Week															
Poll	Pre	1	2	3	4	5	6	7	8	9	10	11	12	13	14	Final
AP	3 (1)	3 (1)	13	13	11	11	9	8	7	7	5	5	11	10	10	9
Coaches	4	3 (1)	15 т	13	11	11	9	8	7	7	5	5	10	11	10	11

== Game summaries ==
=== San Diego State ===
San Diego State at No. 3 UCLA

Team	1	2	3	4	Total
Aztecs	0	7	0	7	14
• No. 3 Bruins	14	17	10	6	47

- Date: September 5
- Location: Rose Bowl, Pasadena, California
- Game attendance: 54,287

=== at No. 2 Nebraska ===
No. 3 UCLA at No. 2 Nebraska

Team	1	2	3	4	Total
No. 3 Bruins	7	3	7	16	33
• No. 2 Cornhuskers	0	14	14	14	42

- Date: September 12
- Location: Memorial Stadium, Lincoln, Nebraska
- Game attendance: 76,313

=== Fresno State ===
Fresno State at No. 13 UCLA

Team	1	2	3	4	Total
Bulldogs	0	0	0	0	0
• No. 13 Bruins	7	3	7	0	17

- Date: September 19
- Location: Rose Bowl, Pasadena, California
- Game attendance: 49,264

Scoring summary
1	UCLA	Gaston Green 33-yard run (Alfredo Velasco kick)	UCLA 7–0
2	UCLA	Alfredo Velasco 41-yard field goal	UCLA 10–0
3	UCLA	Flipper Anderson 26-yard pass from Troy Aikman (Alfredo Velasco kick)	UCLA 17–0

=== No. 16 Oregon ===
No. 16 Oregon at No. 9 UCLA

Team	1	2	3	4	Total
No. 16 Ducks	0	7	3	0	10
• No. 9 Bruins	7	10	7	17	41

- Date: October 17
- Location: Rose Bowl, Pasadena, California
- Game attendance: 53,320

Scoring summary
1	UCLA	Brown 1-yard pass from Aikman (Velasco kick)	UCLA 7–0
2	ORE	Loville 1-yard run (Dennis kick)	Tied 7–7
2	UCLA	Anderson 2-yard pass from Aikman (Velasco kick)	UCLA 14–7
2	UCLA	Velasco 35-yard field goal	UCLA 17–7
3	UCLA	Austin 34-yard run (Velasco kick)	UCLA 24–7
3	ORE	Dennis 32-yard field goal	UCLA 24–10
4	UCLA	Velasco 26-yard field goal	UCLA 27–10
4	UCLA	Green 1-yard run (Velasco kick)	UCLA 34–10
4	UCLA	M. Turner 65-yard interception return (Velasco kick)	UCLA 41–10

=== at Oregon State ===
UCLA had 618 yards of total offense, evenly split with 315 yards passing and 303 yards rushing. Flipper Anderson caught 7 passes for 154 yards and 2 touchdowns in the blowout win over the Beavers.

=== Washington ===
Washington at No. 3 UCLA

Team	1	2	3	4	Total
Huskies	0	14	0	0	14
• No. 5 Bruins	13	3	17	14	47

- Date: November 14
- Location: Rose Bowl, Pasadena, California
- Game attendance: 70,332
- Television network: ABC

=== at USC ===
No. 5 UCLA at USC

Team	1	2	3	4	Total
No. 5 Bruins	7	3	3	0	13
• Trojans	0	0	3	14	17

- Date: November 21
- Location: Los Angeles Memorial Coliseum, Los Angeles, CA
- Game attendance: 92,516
- Television network: ABC

Scoring summary
1		UCLA	Gaston Green 6-yard run (Alfredo Velasco kick)	UCLA 7–0
2		UCLA	Alfredo Velasco 32-yard field goal	UCLA 10–0
2		UCLA	Alfredo Velasco 38-yard field goal	UCLA 13–0
3		USC	Quin Rodriguez 26-yard field goal	UCLA 13–3
4	14:09	USC	Randy Tanner 6-yard pass from Rodney Peete (Quin Rodriguez kick)	UCLA 13–10
4	7:59	USC	Erik Affholter 33-yard pass from Rodney Peete (Quin Rodriguez kick)	USC 17–13

USC clinched a berth in the Rose Bowl with the win.

=== vs. Florida (Aloha Bowl) ===
No. 10 UCLA vs. Florida

Team	1	2	3	4	Total
• No. 10 Bruins	3	7	7	3	20
Gators	7	3	0	6	16

- Date: December 25
- Location: Aloha Stadium, Honolulu, Hawaii
- Game attendance: 24,839
- Referee: Mike Pereira
- TV announcers (ABC): Keith Jackson and Bob Griese

Scoring summary
1	UCLA	Alfredo Velasco 34-yard field goal	UCLA 3–0
1	UF	Stacey Simmons 7-yard pass from Kerwin Bell (Robert McGinty kick)	UF 7–3
2	UF	Robert McGinty 32-yard field goal	UF 10–3
2	UCLA	Brian Brown 1-yard run (Alfredo Velasco kick)	Tied 10–10
3	UCLA	Danny Thompson 5-yard pass from Troy Aikman (Alfredo Velasco kick)	UCLA 17–10
4	UCLA	Alfredo Velasco 32-yard field goal	UCLA 20–10
4	UF	Anthony Williams 14-yard pass from Kerwin Bell (kick blocked)	UCLA 20–16

== Roster ==
1987 UCLA Bruins football team roster
Players
Coaches
Offense

Pos.	#	Name	Class
QB	8	Troy Aikman	Jr
WR	83	Flipper Anderson	Sr
TE	81	Charles Arbuckle	So
RB	21	Eric Ball	Jr
QB		Ron Caragher	So
WR	9	Mike Farr	So
RB	44	Gaston Green	Sr
WR	4	Reggie Moore	Fr

Defense

Pos.	#	Name	Class
CB	2	Darryl Henley	Jr
S	3	James Washington	Sr
LB		Ben Hummel	Sr
DB	31	Carnell Lake	Jr
LB	41	Ken Norton Jr.	Sr
LB	7	Chance Johnson
DB	23	Marcus Turner	Jr

Special teams

Pos.	#	Name	Class
K	25	Alfredo Velasco	So

Head coach

- Terry Donahue

Coordinators/assistant coaches

- Steve Axman – Offensive coordinator

Legend

- (C) Team captain
- (S) Suspended
- (I) Ineligible
- Injured
- Redshirt

== 1988 NFL draft ==
The following players were selected in the 1988 NFL draft following the season.

Player	Position	Round	Pick	Franchise
Gaston Green	Running back	1	14	Los Angeles Rams
Ken Norton Jr.	Linebacker	2	41	Dallas Cowboys
Flipper Anderson	Wide receiver	2	46	Los Angeles Rams
David Richards	Guard	4	98	San Diego Chargers
Dennis Price	Defensive back	5	131	Los Angeles Raiders
James Washington	Defensive back	5	137	Los Angeles Rams
James Primus	Running back	9	222	Atlanta Falcons
Mel Farr	Running back	9	248	Denver Broncos
Paco Craig	Wide receiver	10	254	Detroit Lions
Ben Hummel	Linebacker	12	317	Dallas Cowboys
