= 1987 Washington Huskies football team =

American college football season

1987 Washington Huskies football

Independence Bowl, W 24–12 vs. Tulane
- Conference: Pacific-10 Conference
- Record: 7–4–1 (4–3–1 Pac-10)
- Head coach: Don James (13th season)
- Offensive coordinator: Gary Pinkel (4th season)
- Defensive coordinator: Jim Lambright (10th season)
- MVP: David Rill
- Captains: Chris Chandler; Darryl Franklin; Brian Habib; David Rill
- Home stadium: Husky Stadium

1987 Pacific-10 Conference football standings
	Conf.					Overall
Team	W		L		T	W		L		T
No. 9 UCLA +	7	–	1	–	0	10	–	2	–	0
No. 18 USC +	7	–	1	–	0	8	–	4	–	0
Washington	4	–	3	–	1	7	–	4	–	1
No. 20 Arizona State	3	–	3	–	1	7	–	4	–	1
Oregon	4	–	4	–	0	6	–	5	–	0
Stanford	4	–	4	–	0	5	–	6	–	0
Arizona	2	–	3	–	3	4	–	4	–	3
California	2	–	3	–	2	3	–	6	–	2
Washington State	1	–	5	–	1	3	–	7	–	1
Oregon State	0	–	7	–	0	2	–	9	–	0
+ – Conference co-champions; Rankings from AP Poll

The 1987 Washington Huskies football team was an American football team that represented the University of Washington during the 1987 NCAA Division I-A football season. In its 13th season under head coach Don James, the team compiled a 7–4–1 record, finished in third place in the Pacific-10 Conference, and outscored its opponents by a combined total of 295 to 254. David Rill was selected as the team's most valuable player. Rill, Chris Chandler, Darryl Franklin, Brian Habib were the team captains.

== Schedule ==
Date	Opponent	Rank	Site	Result	Attendance	Source
September 5	Stanford	No. 13	Husky Stadium; Seattle, WA	W 31–21	73,676	
September 12	Purdue*	No. 12	Husky Stadium; Seattle, WA	W 28–10	70,492	
September 19	at Texas A&M*	No. 10	Kyle Field; College Station, TX	L 12–29	58,178	
September 26	Pacific (CA)*	No. 18	Husky Stadium; Seattle, WA	W 31–3	69,605	
October 3	at Oregon	No. 16	Autzen Stadium; Eugene, OR (rivalry)	L 22–29	44,421	
October 10	No. 13 Arizona State		Husky Stadium; Seattle, WA	W 27–14	73,883	
October 17	USC		Husky Stadium; Seattle, WA	L 23–37	71,678	
October 31	Oregon State		Husky Stadium; Seattle, WA	W 28–12	66,392	
November 7	at Arizona		Arizona Stadium; Tucson, AZ	T 21–21	50,021	
November 14	at No. 7 UCLA		Rose Bowl; Pasadena, CA	L 14–47	70,332	
November 21	Washington State		Husky Stadium; Seattle, WA (Apple Cup)	W 34–19	74,038	
December 19	vs. Tulane*		Independence Stadium; Shreveport, LA (Independence Bowl)	W 24–12	41,683	
*Non-conference game; Rankings from AP Poll released prior to the game

== Game summaries ==
=== Arizona State ===
	1	2	3	4	Total
Arizona St	0	0	14	0	14
Washington	14	3	0	10	27

== Roster ==
1987 Washington Huskies football team roster
Players
Coaches
Offense

Pos.	#	Name	Class
TE	89	Bill Ames	So
C	60	Bern Brostek	So
QB	17	Chris Chandler (C)	Sr
FB	36	James Compton	Fr
QB	10	Cary Conklin	So
FB	39	Tony Covington	Jr
FL	7	Darryl Franklin (C)	Sr
FB	29	Aaron Jenkins	Jr
OT	66	Kelly John-Lewis	Jr
TE	82	Scott Jones	Jr
TB	20	Greg Lewis	Fr
OT	74	Rick McLeod	Sr
FL	8	Brian Slater	Jr
TB	22	Vince Weathersby	Jr
G	77	Brett Wiese	Jr
G	50	Mike Zandofsky	Jr

Defense

Pos.	#	Name	Class
DT	79	Dennis Brown	So
LB	46	Tom Erlandson	Sr
FS	40	Daryl Hall	Jr
DE	56	Martin Harrison	Sr
CB	6	Le-Lo Lang	So
CB	4	Art Malone	Jr
ROV	24	Will Rideout	Sr
LB	38	David Rill (C)	Sr
DT	91	Brian Habib (C)	Sr
DE	96	Bob Willig	Jr
OLB	3	Bo Yates	Sr

Special teams

Pos.	#	Name	Class
PK	5	Brandy Brownlee	Sr
P	37	Eric Canton	Fr

Head coach

- Don James (13th year)

Coordinators/assistant coaches

- Gary Pinkel – OC
- Jeff Woodruff - WR
- Matt Simon - RB
- Dan Dorazio - OL
- Todd Williams - GA
- Steve Barrow - GA
- Jim Lambright – DC
- Chris Tormey - LB
- Jim Heacock - DL
- Jay Niemann – GA
- Charlie Hall - GA
- Craig McCord - GA

Legend

- (C) Team captain
- (S) Suspended
- (I) Ineligible
- Injured
- Redshirt

== NFL draft ==
Five Huskies were selected in the 1988 NFL draft.

Player	Position	Round	Overall	Franchise
Chris Chandler	QB	3	76	Indianapolis Colts
Darryl Franklin	WR	8	201	Los Angeles Rams
Brian Habib	DL	10	264	Minnesota Vikings
Rick McLeod	T	11	284	Seattle Seahawks
Tom Erlandson	LB	12	316	Buffalo Bills
