= Pop Warner Trophy =

American college football award, 1949–2004

The Glenn "Pop" Warner Memorial Trophy was awarded annually from 1949 to 2004 by the Palo Club to the most valuable senior player on the West Coast.

In 2025, the Pop Warner Trophy returned after nearly two decades and the first two honorees of the reinvigorated award, which now honors the best college football player in the West, were California quarterback Jaron-Keawe Sagapolutele for 2025 and Stanford football general manager and former Cardinal quarterback Andrew Luck for 2010.

Pop Warner Trophy winners
| Year | Player | School (#) |
|---|---|---|
| 1949 | Eddie LeBaron | University of the Pacific (1) |
| 1950 | Russ Pomeroy | Stanford (1) |
| 1951 | Ollie Matson | University of San Francisco (1) |
| 1952 | Jim Sears | USC (1) |
| 1953 | Bob Garrett | Stanford (2) |
| 1954 | George Shaw | Oregon (1) |
| 1955 | Bob Davenport | UCLA (1) |
| 1956 | Jon Arnett | USC (2) |
| 1957 | Joe Francis | Oregon State (1) |
| 1958 | Joe Kapp | California (1) |
| 1959 | Chris Burford | Stanford (3) |
| 1960 | Billy Kilmer | UCLA (2) |
| 1961 | Chon Gallegos | San Jose State (1) |
| 1962 | Terry Baker | Oregon State (2) |
| 1963 | Vern Burke | Oregon State (3) |
| 1964 | Craig Morton | California (2) |
| 1965 | Mike Garrett | USC (3) |
| 1966 | Pete Pifer | Oregon State (4) |
| 1967 | Gary Beban | UCLA (3) |
| 1968 | O. J. Simpson | USC (4) |
| 1969 | Don Parish | Stanford (4) |
| 1970 | Jim Plunkett | Stanford (5) |
| 1971 | Jeff Siemon | Stanford (6) |
| 1972 | Mike Rae | USC (5) |
| 1973 | Lynn Swann | USC (6) |
| 1974 | Anthony Davis | USC (7) |
| 1975 | Chuck Muncie | California (3) |
| 1976 | Ricky Bell | USC (8) |
| 1977 | Guy Benjamin | Stanford (7) |
| 1978 | Jerry Robinson | UCLA (4) |
| 1979 | Charles White | USC (9) |
| 1980 | Ken Margerum | Stanford (8) |
| 1981 | Marcus Allen | USC (10) |
| 1982 | John Elway | Stanford (9) |
| 1983 | Ron Rivera | California (4) |
| 1984 | Jack Del Rio | USC (11) |
| 1985 | Rueben Mayes | Washington State (1) |
| 1986 | Dave Wyman | Stanford (10) |
| 1987 | Mike Perez | San Jose State (2) |
| 1988 | Rodney Peete | USC (12) |
| 1989 | Tim Ryan | USC (13) |
| 1990 | Greg Lewis | Washington (1) |
| 1991 | Tommy Vardell | Stanford (11) |
| 1992 | Glyn Milburn | Stanford (12) |
| 1993 | Johnnie Morton | USC (14) |
| 1994 | Steve Stenstrom | Stanford (13) |
| 1995 | Keyshawn Johnson | USC (15) |
| 1996 | Jake Plummer | Arizona State (1) |
| 1997 | Skip Hicks | UCLA (5) |
| 1998 | Cade McNown | UCLA (6) |
| 1999 | Deltha O'Neal | California (5) |
| 2000 | Marques Tuiasosopo | Washington (2) |
| 2001 | | |
| 2002 | Carson Palmer | USC (16) |
| 2003 | Dave Ball | UCLA (7) |
| 2004 | J. J. Arrington | California (6) |
| 2005-09 | | |
| 2010 | Andrew Luck | Stanford (14) |
| 2011-24 | | |
| 2025 | Jaron-Keawe Sagapolutele | California (7) |
