= 1987 Oregon Ducks football team =

American college football season

1987 Oregon Ducks football
- Conference: Pacific-10 Conference
- Record: 6–5 (4–4 Pac-10)
- Head coach: Rich Brooks (11th season)
- Offensive coordinator: Bob Toledo (5th season)
- Offensive scheme: I formation
- Defensive coordinator: Denny Schuler (2nd season)
- Base defense: 5–2
- Captains: Anthony Newman; Jeff Stefanick
- Home stadium: Autzen Stadium

1987 Pacific-10 Conference football standings
	Conf.					Overall
Team	W		L		T	W		L		T
No. 9 UCLA +	7	–	1	–	0	10	–	2	–	0
No. 18 USC +	7	–	1	–	0	8	–	4	–	0
Washington	4	–	3	–	1	7	–	4	–	1
No. 20 Arizona State	3	–	3	–	1	7	–	4	–	1
Oregon	4	–	4	–	0	6	–	5	–	0
Stanford	4	–	4	–	0	5	–	6	–	0
Arizona	2	–	3	–	3	4	–	4	–	3
California	2	–	3	–	2	3	–	6	–	2
Washington State	1	–	5	–	1	3	–	7	–	1
Oregon State	0	–	7	–	0	2	–	9	–	0
+ – Conference co-champions; Rankings from AP Poll

The 1987 Oregon Ducks football team represented the University of Oregon in the 1987 NCAA Division I-A football season. Playing as a member of the Pacific-10 Conference (Pac-10), the team was led by head coach Rich Brooks, in his eleventh year, and played their home games at Autzen Stadium in Eugene, Oregon. The Ducks finished the season with a record of six wins and five losses (6–5 overall, 4–4 in the Pac-10), their first winning season since 1984.

== Schedule ==
Date	Time	Opponent	Rank	Site	TV	Result	Attendance	Source
September 12	11:00 am	at Colorado*		Folsom Field; Boulder, CO		W 10–7	40,521	
September 19	10:30 am	at No. 5 Ohio State*		Ohio Stadium; Columbus, OH		L 14–24	89,882	
September 26	1:00 pm	San Diego State*		Autzen Stadium; Eugene, OR		W 25–20	31,573	
October 3	1:00 pm	No. 16 Washington		Autzen Stadium; Eugene, OR (rivalry)		W 29–22	44,421	
October 10	1:00 pm	USC		Autzen Stadium; Eugene, OR (rivalry)		W 34–27	39,587	
October 17	12:30 pm	at No. 9 UCLA	No. 16	Rose Bowl; Pasadena, CA	ABC	L 10–41	53,320	
October 24	1:00 pm	at Stanford		Stanford Stadium; Stanford, CA (rivalry)		L 10–13	38,500	
October 31	1:00 pm	California		Autzen Stadium; Eugene, OR		L 6–20	37,255	
November 7	4:00 pm	at Arizona State		Sun Devil Stadium; Tempe, AZ	KEZI	L 17–37	69,932	
November 14	1:00 pm	at Washington State		Martin Stadium; Pullman, WA		W 31–17	14,089	
November 21	1:00 pm	Oregon State		Autzen Stadium; Eugene, OR (Civil War)		W 44–0	43,157	
*Non-conference game; Rankings from AP Poll released prior to the game; All times are in Pacific time

== Game summaries ==
=== Ohio State ===
Oregon Ducks at Ohio State Buckeyes

Quarter	1	2	3	4	Total
Oregon	0	0	0	14	14
Ohio St	0	3	14	7	24

at Ohio Stadium, Columbus, Ohio

- Date: September 19, 1987
- Game time: 1:30 p.m.
- Game weather: Sunny, 74 °F (23 °C)
- Game attendance: 89,882
- Referee: Jerry Hendrickson
- Box Score

Game information

Second quarter

- OSU – Matt Frantz 34-yard field goal, 8:01. Ohio St 3–0. Drive: 11 plays, 47 yards, 4:04.

Third quarter

- OSU – Jay Koch 4-yard pass from Tom Tupa (Matt Frantz kick), 4:29. Ohio St 10–0. Drive: 14 plays, 88 yards, 6:23.
- OSU – George Cooper 19-yard pass from Tom Tupa (Matt Frantz kick), 3:15. Ohio St 17–0. Drive: 1 play, 19 yards, 0:09.

'Fourth quarter

- ORE – Joe Meerten 8-yard pass from Bill Musgrave (Kirk Dennis kick), 6:40. Ohio St 17–7. Drive: 2 plays, 8 yards, 0:13.
- OSU – Vince Workman 5-yard run (Matt Frantz kick), 3:17. Ohio St 24–7. Drive: 8 plays, 80 yards, 3:23.
- ORE – Rod Green 7-yard pass from Bill Musgrave (Kirk Dennis kick), 1:47. Ohio St 24–14. Drive: 7 plays, 77 yards, 1:23.

Top passers

- ORE – Bill Musgrave – 18/27, 205 yards, 2 TD
- OSU – Tom Tupa – 20/32, 234 yards, 2 TD

Top rushers

- ORE – Latin Berry – 18 rushes, 33 yards
- OSU – Vince Workman – 27 rushes, 162 yards, TD

Top receivers

- ORE – Terry Obee – 4 receptions, 63 yards
- OSU – Vince Workman – 5 receptions, 63 yards

== Roster ==
1987 Oregon Ducks football team roster
Players
Coaches
Offense

Pos.	#	Name	Class
RB		Latin Berry
WR		J.J. Birden
TE		Eric Elliott
OL		Gary Gilbert
WR		Rod Green
RB		Tony Hargain
RB		James Harper
OL		Eric Hunter
OL		Chris Husko
OL		Todd Kunzman
RB		Russell Lawson
RB		Derek Loville
TE		Joe Meerten
QB		Bill Musgrave
QB		Pete Nelson
WR		Terry Obee
TE		Tim Parker
OL		Gary Robertson
RB		Kerrell Robinson
OL		Jeff Stefanick
OL		Andy Sunia
RB		Ken Wegner
RB		Randy Willhite
RB		Brett Zaharie

Defense

Pos.	#	Name	Class
LB		Mike Blakey
DL		Matt Brock
DL		Devinn Fitzpatrick
DB		Ron Gould
DB		Derek Horton
LB		Bjarne Jensen
DB		Thom Kaumeyer
LB		Mark Kearns
LB		Scott Kozak
DB		Anthony Newman
DB		Chris Oldham
DL		Rollin Putzier
LB		Tom Talbot
DL		Joe Taylor
DB		Brett Young

Special teams

Pos.	#	Name	Class
K		Kirk Dennis
P		Jan Cespedes

Head coach

- Rich Brooks

Coordinators/assistant coaches

- Bob Toledo (OC)

Legend

- (C) Team captain
- (S) Suspended
- (I) Ineligible
- Injured
- Redshirt

== Team players drafted into the NFL ==
Player	Position	Round	Pick	NFL club
Anthony Newman	Defensive back	2	35	Los Angeles Rams
Rollin Putzier	Defensive tackle	4	88	Green Bay Packers
J. J. Birden	Wide receiver	8	215	Cleveland Browns
