= K. J. Costello =

American football player (born 1997)

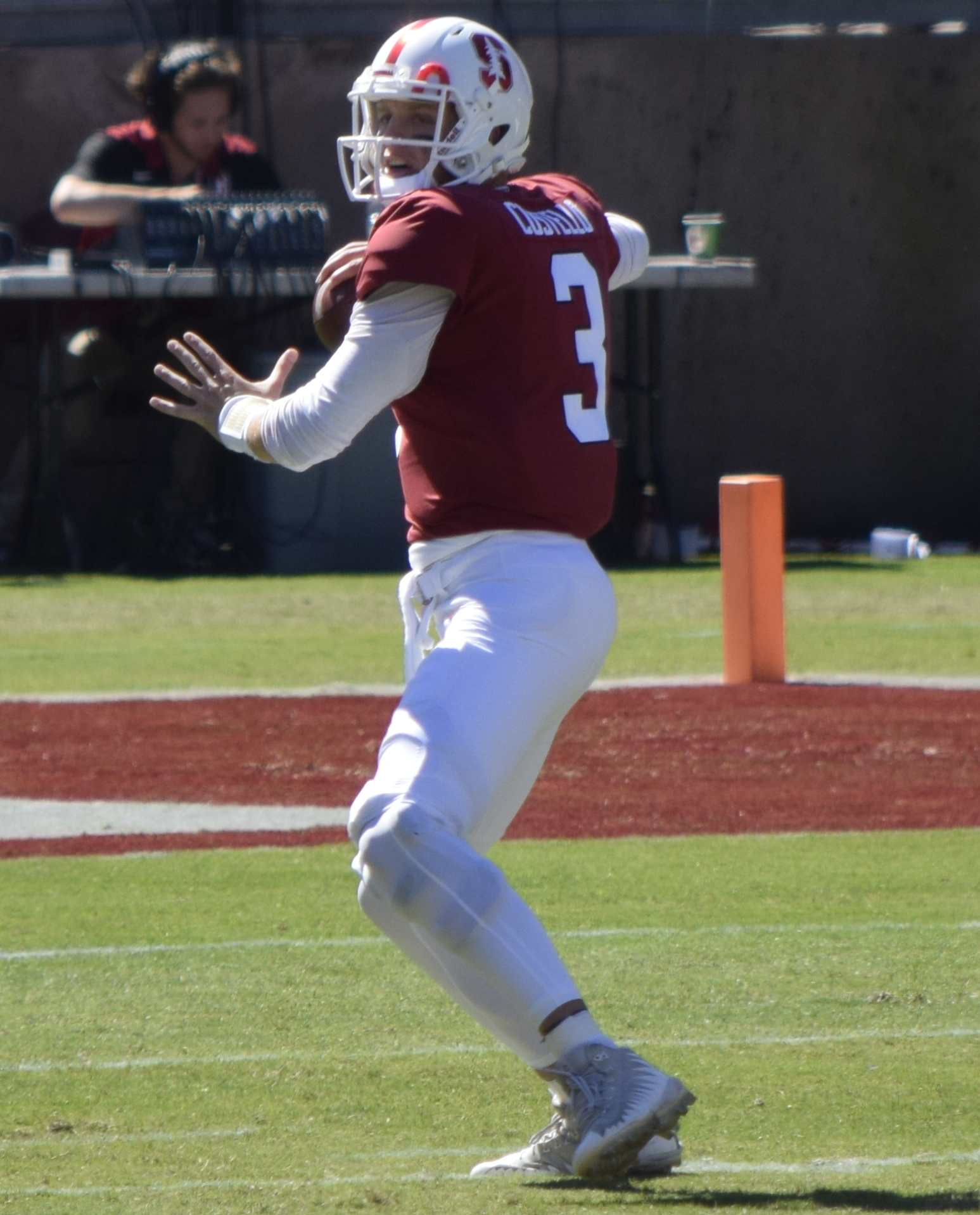
- Costello with the Stanford Cardinal in 2018

No. 19
- Position: Quarterback

Personal information
- Born: June 7, 1997 (age 29); Newport Beach, California, U.S.
- Listed height: 6 ft 5 in (1.96 m)
- Listed weight: 225 lb (102 kg)

Career information
- High school: Santa Margarita Catholic (Rancho Santa Margarita, California)
- College: Stanford (2016–2019); Mississippi State (2020)
- NFL draft: 2021: undrafted

Career history
- Los Angeles Chargers (2021)*; Philadelphia Stars (2022); New Orleans Saints (2022)*; Philadelphia Stars (2023)
- * Offseason or practice squad member only

Awards and highlights
- Second-team All-Pac-12 (2018)

Kevin Richard "K. J." Costello (born June 7, 1997) is an American former professional football quarterback. He played college football for the Stanford Cardinal and the Mississippi State Bulldogs. At Stanford, he was named second-team All-Pac-12 in 2018 after passing for 3,540 yards, moving ahead of Andrew Luck and John Elway on Stanford’s single-season passing yards list. In 2020, he set the SEC single-game passing record with 623 yards in Mississippi State's upset win over defending national champion LSU. He later spent time with the Los Angeles Chargers, New Orleans Saints, and Philadelphia Stars.

== Early life ==
Costello attended Santa Margarita Catholic High School in Rancho Santa Margarita, California. During his high school football career, he passed for a school record 8,222 yards, surpassing a record previously held by Carson Palmer and 62 passing touchdowns. Rated as one of the top quarterback recruits in his class, Costello committed to Stanford University to play college football.

== College career ==
Costello redshirted his first year at Stanford in 2016. He entered 2017 as a backup to Keller Chryst, but made his first career start against UCLA after Chryst was injured. Costello returned as the backup after the game; however, he took over as the starter prior to the eighth game of the season. He remained the starter throughout the rest of the season and finished with 1,573 passing yards, 14 touchdowns and four interceptions and took the Cardinal to the Pac-12 Championship game.

KJ Costello started 35 games in College football. He holds the SEC Single-Game passing record with 623 yards against the defending national champions, LSU Tigers. He passed Andrew Luck & John Elway for all-time on the list for most passing yards in a single season at Stanford with 3540 yards.

On December 18, 2019, Costello entered the NCAA transfer portal as a graduate transfer. On February 3, 2020, Costello announced he would be grad transferring to Mississippi State.

Costello made his first start for Mississippi State on September 26, 2020, where he broke the SEC record for passing yards in a single game with 623 yards in a 44–34 victory over the defending national champion, LSU.

=== Statistics ===
Season	Team	Games			Passing								Rushing			
Season	Team	GP	GS	Record	Comp	Att	Pct	Yards	Avg	TD	Int	Rate	Att	Yards	Avg	TD
2016	Stanford	Redshirt														
2017	Stanford	11	7	4−3	124	211	58.8	1,573	7.5	14	4	139.5	28	92	3.3	3
2018	Stanford	13	13	9−4	269	413	65.1	3,540	8.6	29	11	155.0	42	-20	-0.5	0
2019	Stanford	5	5	2−3	102	167	61.1	1,038	6.2	6	3	121.6	18	24	1.3	0
2020	Mississippi State	6	5	1−4	134	209	64.1	1,283	6.1	6	11	114.6	24	-65	-2.7	0
Career		35	30	16−14	629	1,000	62.9	7,434	7.4	55	29	137.7	112	31	0.3	3

== Professional career ==
=== Los Angeles Chargers ===
On August 1, 2021, Costello signed with the Los Angeles Chargers after going undrafted in the 2021 NFL draft. He was waived on August 17.

=== Philadelphia Stars ===
Costello signed with the Philadelphia Stars of the United States Football League on May 27, 2022.

=== New Orleans Saints ===
On August 10, 2022, Costello signed with the New Orleans Saints. He was waived on August 21, 2022.

=== Philadelphia Stars (second stint) ===
On February 17, 2023, Costello re-signed with the Philadelphia Stars. He was transferred to the team's inactive list on March 19, 2023. The Stars folded when the XFL and USFL merged to create the United Football League (UFL).

== Career statistics ==
Spring Football statistics
Year	Team	League	Games			Passing								Rushing			
Year	Team	League	GP	GS	Record	Cmp	Att	Pct	Yds	Y/A	TD	Int	Rtg	Att	Yds	Avg	TD
2022	PHI	USFL	2	0	0-0	4	10	40.0	69	6.9	0	0	64.2	5	-15	-3.0	0
