= Ken Margerum =

American football player and coach (born 1958)

No. 89, 82, 84
- Position: Wide receiver

Personal information
- Born: October 5, 1958 (age 68); Fountain Valley, California, U.S.
- Listed height: 6 ft 0 in (1.83 m)
- Listed weight: 175 lb (79 kg)

Career information
- High school: Fountain Valley (CA)
- College: Stanford
- NFL draft: 1981: 3rd round, 67th overall pick

Career history

Playing
- Chicago Bears (1981–1986); San Francisco 49ers (1986-1987); Green Bay Packers (1988)*
- * Offseason or practice squad member only

Coaching
- Hawaii Prep (OC) (1993–1995); Hawaii (WR) (1996); Menlo (1997–1999); California (WR) (2000–2001); Laney (TE) (2002); Scottish Claymores (OC) (2003); Stanford (WR) (2004); San Jose state (OC/QB) (2005); San Jose State (co-OC/RB) (2006); San Jose State (WR) (2007–2009)

Awards and highlights
- Super Bowl champion (XX); PFWA All-Rookie Team (1981); Unanimous All-American (1980); Consensus All-American (1979); Pop Warner Trophy (1980); 3× First-team All-Pac-10 (1978, 1979, 1980)

Career NFL statistics
- Receptions: 94
- Receiving yards: 1,336
- Receiving touchdowns: 8
- Stats at Pro Football Reference
- College Football Hall of Fame

Kenneth Margerum (born October 5, 1958) is an American former professional football player who was a wide receiver in the National Football League (NFL) for seven seasons during the 1980s. Margerum played college football for Stanford University, and earned consensus All-American honors twice. He played professionally for the Chicago Bears and San Francisco 49ers of the NFL.

He has also coached in several capacities at the college level, as head football coach at Menlo College, wide receivers coach at Stanford and the University of Hawaii, and through the 2009 season as an assistant coach for San Jose State University. Margerum also served as offensive coordinator for the Scottish Claymores in NFL Europe.

== College career ==
Margerum attended Fountain Valley High School and Stanford University, where he played for the Stanford Cardinal football team from 1977 to 1980. A consensus first-team All-American wide receiver in 1979 and 1980, Margerum was known for his acrobatic catches and sure hands. Margerum was a favorite target of Stanford quarterback John Elway. He held the Pac-10 record for career touchdowns with 32 until 2006 when Dwayne Jarrett broke it and held the Stanford record for receiving yards (2,430) until that mark was broken in 1999 by Troy Walters.

=== College statistics ===
Legend
	Led the Pac-10
	Pac-10 record
	Led the NCAA
	NCAA record
**Bold**	Career high

College receiving statistics*
Season	School	Games	Rec	Yds	Avg	TD	Att	Yds	Avg	TD
Team		Receiving					Rushing			
1977	Stanford	**11**	3	64	**21.3**	0	0	0	0.0	0
1978	Stanford	**11**	**53**	**942**	17.8	9	**3**	21	7.0	0
1979	Stanford	**11**	41	733	17.9	10	1	11	**11.0**	0
1980	Stanford	**11**	44	691	15.7	**11**	**3**	**33**	**11.0**	0
Career	Stanford	44	141	2,430	17.2	30	7	65	9.3	0

* Includes bowl games.

On April 30, 2009, The National Football Foundation & College Football Hall of Fame announced that Margerum was one of sixteen players and two coaches selected to the 2009 Class of the College Hall of Fame.

== Professional career ==
Margerum was selected 67th overall by the Chicago Bears in the 1981 NFL draft and earned first-team All-Rookie honors that year. He was a member of the Bears victorious Super Bowl XX team. Margerum served primarily as a third-down receiver and special teams player for the Bears that year, after successfully recuperating from a torn ACL suffered the prior season. Sports Illustrated published a small article (with photo) on Margerum, detailing his use of unorthodox activities - wind surfing and mountain biking - as he rehabbed his knee. During his time with the Bears, critics of Margerum, including then Offensive coordinator Greg Landry, suggested he often "left his feet" after catching the ball and had limited run-after-the catch ability after returning from his knee injury. Margerum was also closely associated with his friend and fellow Bears teammate Jim McMahon. After a regular season touchdown from McMahon to Margerum, the two players celebrated by oddly wiggling and shaking their arms at one another while butting heads. Margerum was also known to wear "floppy" black high top cleats as a means to deceive defensive backs into thinking he was slow. After five years with the Bears, Margerum finished up the 1986 and 1987 seasons with the San Francisco 49ers. He later went to camp with the Green Bay Packers, but did not play in any regular season games for the club.

== Coaching career ==
Margerum began his coaching career as offensive coordinator at Hawaii Preparatory Academy in 1993. After three seasons there, he became wide receivers coach at the University of Hawaii in 1996 under Fred von Appen. He was then head coach at Menlo College, an NCAA Division III independent school, from 1997 to 1999.

After two seasons at California on Tom Holmoe's staff as wide receivers coach, Margerum moved to the junior college level in 2002 as tight ends coach at Laney College. He then became offensive coordinator for the NFL Europe's Scottish Claymores in 2003. The following year, Margerum returned to the collegiate ranks as wide receivers coach at Stanford under Buddy Teevens.

In 2005, Margerum joined Dick Tomey's staff at San Jose State as offensive coordinator and quarterbacks coach. He became co-offensive coordinator and running backs coach in 2006 and helped the Spartans win the 2006 New Mexico Bowl. He was then wide receivers coach from 2007 to 2009.

== Head coaching record ==
Year	Team	Overall	Conference	Standing	Bowl/playoffs
Menlo Oaks (NCAA Division III independent) (1997–1999)
1997	Menlo	5–5			
1998	Menlo	2–8			
1999	Menlo	5–4			
Menlo:		12–17			
Total:		12–17			
