= Jason Palumbis =

American football player (born 1969)

Profile
- Position: Quarterback

Personal information
- Born: July 15, 1969 (age 57)
- Listed height: 6 ft 2 in (1.88 m)
- Listed weight: 205 lb (93 kg)

Career information
- High school: Lake Oswego (OR) Lakeridge
- College: Stanford
- NFL draft: 1992: undrafted

Career history
- San Antonio Force (1992)
- Stats at ArenaFan.com

Jason Palumbis (born July 15, 1969) is a business executive and former American football quarterback.

== Football career ==
Palumbis was a highly recruited quarterback from Lakeridge High School in Lake Oswego, Oregon who played college football at Stanford University. The 6' 3", 200 lb. Palumbis was Stanford's primary starting quarterback from 1988 to 1990. In 1990, he set Stanford's single-season completion percentage record (.686 on 234 completions out of 341 attempts), a record that still stands. After a slow start in the 1991 season, Palumbis lost the starting role to Steve Stenstrom.

== 1990 Big Game ==
Palumbis was Stanford's quarterback during one of Stanford's most dramatic comeback victories: the 93rd Big Game, played on November 17, 1990. In the game, which many Stanford fans consider to be the revenge for "The Play" eight years earlier, Stanford trailed 25–18 late in the game. With 12 seconds left, Palumbis threw a 19-yard touchdown pass to Ed McCaffrey to make the score 25–24. Stanford failed to convert the two-point conversion, and the Cal fans rushed the field, thinking the game to be all but over. Cal was penalized 15 yards for delay of the game while the field had to be cleared, and Stanford's Dan Byers recovered the ensuing onside kick. As Palumbis tried to get Stanford in field goal range, his pass to McCaffrey fell short, but a Cal defender was called for roughing Palumbis. Stanford kicker John Hopkins connected on a 39-yard field goal as time expired, giving Stanford the 27–25 victory.

== After football ==
Palumbis played briefly for the San Antonio Force in the Arena Football League before retiring from football.

Since 2020, he is president and CEO of Miller Paint, a Portland, Oregon-based paint manufacturer.
