= 1987 USC Trojans football team =

American college football season

1987 USC Trojans football

Pac-10 co-champion

Rose Bowl, L 17–20 vs. Michigan State
- Conference: Pacific-10 Conference

Ranking
- Coaches: No. 17
- AP: No. 18
- Record: 8–4 (7–1 Pac-10)
- Head coach: Larry Smith (1st season)
- Offensive coordinator: Chuck Stobart (1st season)
- Captains: Dave Cadigan; Greg Coauette
- Home stadium: Los Angeles Memorial Coliseum

1987 Pacific-10 Conference football standings
	Conf.					Overall
Team	W		L		T	W		L		T
No. 9 UCLA +	7	–	1	–	0	10	–	2	–	0
No. 18 USC +	7	–	1	–	0	8	–	4	–	0
Washington	4	–	3	–	1	7	–	4	–	1
No. 20 Arizona State	3	–	3	–	1	7	–	4	–	1
Oregon	4	–	4	–	0	6	–	5	–	0
Stanford	4	–	4	–	0	5	–	6	–	0
Arizona	2	–	3	–	3	4	–	4	–	3
California	2	–	3	–	2	3	–	6	–	2
Washington State	1	–	5	–	1	3	–	7	–	1
Oregon State	0	–	7	–	0	2	–	9	–	0
+ – Conference co-champions; Rankings from AP Poll

The 1987 Southern Cal Trojans football team represented the University of Southern California in the 1987 NCAA Division I-A football season. In their first year under head coach Larry Smith, the Trojans compiled an 8–4 record (7–1 against conference opponents), won the Pacific-10 Conference (Pac-10) championship, and outscored their opponents by a combined total of 321 to 229.

The Trojans lost their inaugural game of Larry Smith's tenure to Michigan State in the first night game ever played at Spartan Stadium. USC secured a Rose Bowl berth by tying UCLA for the Pacific-10 championship and winning the head-to-head match. They faced Michigan State again and lost 20–17.

Quarterback Rodney Peete led the team in passing, completing 197 of 332 passes for 2,709 yards with 21 touchdowns and 12 interceptions. Steven Webster led the team in rushing with 239 carries for 1,109 yards and six touchdowns. Erik Affholter led the team in receiving yards with 44 catches for 640 yards and four touchdowns.

== Schedule ==
Date	Time	Opponent	Rank	Site	TV	Result	Attendance	Source
September 7	5:00 p.m.	at No. 17 Michigan State*	No. 19	Spartan Stadium; East Lansing, MI	ABC	L 13–27	77,922	
September 19	12:30 p.m.	No. 19 Boston College*		Los Angeles Memorial Coliseum; Los Angeles, CA	ABC	W 23–17	46,205	
September 26	1:00 p.m.	at California		California Memorial Stadium; Berkeley, CA		W 31–14	62,000	
October 3	6:30 p.m.	Oregon State		Los Angeles Memorial Coliseum; Los Angeles, CA		W 48–14	47,979	
October 10	1:00 p.m.	at Oregon		Autzen Stadium; Eugene, OR		L 27–34	39,587	
October 17	12:30 p.m.	at Washington		Husky Stadium; Seattle, WA	ABC	W 37–23	71,678	
October 24	12:30 p.m.	at No. 10 Notre Dame*		Notre Dame Stadium; Notre Dame, IN (rivalry)	CBS	L 15–26	59,075	
October 31	1:30 p.m.	Washington State		Los Angeles Memorial Coliseum; Los Angeles, CA		W 42–7	24,834	
November 7	12:30 p.m.	Stanford^{†}		Los Angeles Memorial Coliseum; Los Angeles, CA (rivalry)	ABC	W 39–24	58,922	
November 14	1:30 p.m.	Arizona		Los Angeles Memorial Coliseum; Los Angeles, CA		W 12–10	51,428	
November 21	12:30 p.m.	No. 5 UCLA		Los Angeles Memorial Coliseum; Los Angeles, CA (Victory Bell)	ABC	W 17–13	92,516	
January 1, 1988	2:00 p.m.	vs. No. 8 Michigan State*	No. 16	Rose Bowl; Pasadena, CA (Rose Bowl)	NBC	L 17–20	103,847	
*Non-conference game; ^{†}Homecoming; Rankings from AP Poll released prior to the game

== Game summaries ==
=== Arizona ===
	1	2	3	4	Total
Arizona	7	0	3	0	10
USC	3	3	0	6	12

=== UCLA ===
No. 5 UCLA at USC

Team	1	2	3	4	Total
No. 5 Bruins	7	3	3	0	13
• Trojans	0	0	3	14	17

- Date: November 21
- Location: Los Angeles Memorial Coliseum, Los Angeles, CA
- Game attendance: 92,516

Scoring summary
1		UCLA	Gaston Green 6-yard run (Alfredo Velasco kick)	UCLA 7-0
2		UCLA	Alfredo Velasco 32-yard field goal	UCLA 10-0
2		UCLA	Alfredo Velasco 38-yard field goal	UCLA 13-0
3		USC	Quin Rodriguez 26-yard field goal	UCLA 13-3
4	14:09	USC	Randy Tanner 6-yard pass from Rodney Peete (Quin Rodriguez kick)	UCLA 13-10
4	7:59	USC	Erik Affholter 33-yard pass from Rodney Peete (Quin Rodriguez kick)	USC 17-13

USC clinched berth in the Rose Bowl with the win.

== Roster ==
1987 USC Trojans football team roster
Players
Coaches
Offense

Pos.	#	Name	Class
WR	42	Erik Affholter	Jr
WR	88	Gene Arrington	Jr
RB		Aaron Emanuel	So
RB	34	Ricky Ervins	Fr
TE	86	Scott Galbraith	So
TE	17	Paul Green	Jr
OT		John Guerrero	Jr
RB	39	Leroy Holt	So
QB	4	Pat O'Hara	Fr
C	63	Brad Leggett	So
RB	40	Scott Lockwood	Fr
QB	16	Rodney Peete	Jr
G	75	Mark Tucker	Fr
WR	83	Gary Wellman	Fr

Defense

Pos.	#	Name	Class
S	7	Mark Carrier	Fr
CB	2	Chris Hale	Jr
DT	93	Pat Harlow	Fr
DT	90	Dan Owens	So
LB	35	Scott Ross	Fr
DT	99	Tim Ryan	So
LB	55	Junior Seau	Fr

Special teams

Pos.	#	Name	Class
K	11	Quin Rodriguez	Fr

Head coach

- Larry Smith

Coordinators/assistant coaches

- John Matsko
- Tom Roggeman

Legend

- (C) Team captain
- (S) Suspended
- (I) Ineligible
- Injured
- Redshirt
