= 1987 Washington State Cougars football team =

American college football season

1987 Washington State Cougars football
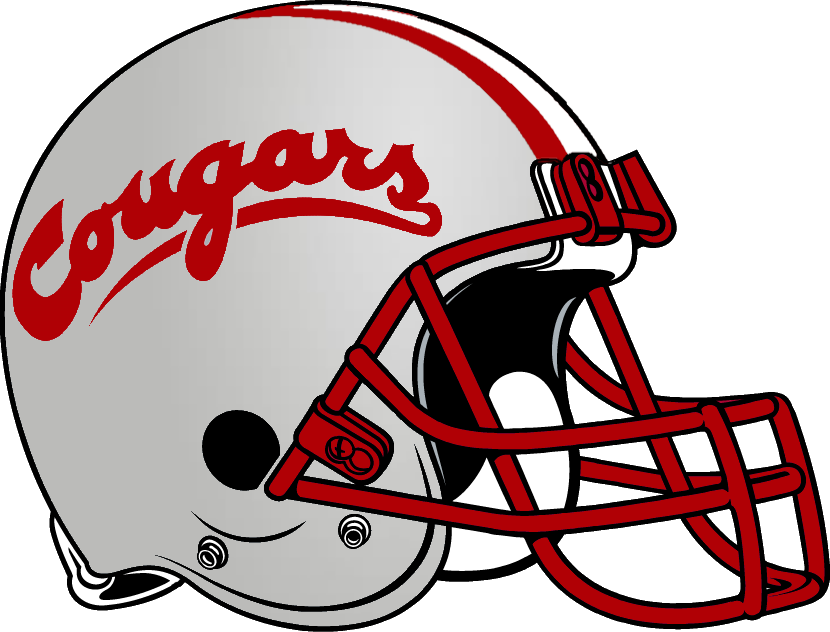
- Conference: Pacific-10 Conference
- Record: 3–7–1 (1–5–1 Pac-10)
- Head coach: Dennis Erickson (1st season)
- Offensive coordinator: Bob Bratkowski (1st season)
- Offensive scheme: Single-back spread
- Defensive coordinator: John L. Smith (1st season)
- Base defense: 4–3
- Home stadium: Martin Stadium

1987 Pacific-10 Conference football standings
| | Conf. | | | | | Overall |
| Team | W | | L | | T | W | | L | | T |
|---|---|---|---|---|---|---|---|---|---|---|
| No. 9 UCLA + | 7 | – | 1 | – | 0 | 10 | – | 2 | – | 0 |
| No. 18 USC + | 7 | – | 1 | – | 0 | 8 | – | 4 | – | 0 |
| Washington | 4 | – | 3 | – | 1 | 7 | – | 4 | – | 1 |
| No. 20 Arizona State | 3 | – | 3 | – | 1 | 7 | – | 4 | – | 1 |
| Oregon | 4 | – | 4 | – | 0 | 6 | – | 5 | – | 0 |
| Stanford | 4 | – | 4 | – | 0 | 5 | – | 6 | – | 0 |
| Arizona | 2 | – | 3 | – | 3 | 4 | – | 4 | – | 3 |
| California | 2 | – | 3 | – | 2 | 3 | – | 6 | – | 2 |
| Washington State | 1 | – | 5 | – | 1 | 3 | – | 7 | – | 1 |
| Oregon State | 0 | – | 7 | – | 0 | 2 | – | 9 | – | 0 |
+ – Conference co-champions; Rankings from AP Poll

The 1987 Washington State Cougars football team was an American football team that represented Washington State University in the Pacific-10 Conference (Pac-10) during the 1987 NCAA Division I-A football season. In their first season under head coach Dennis Erickson, the Cougars compiled a 3–7–1 record (1–5–1 in Pac-10, ninth), and were outscored 356 to 238. Home games were played on campus at Martin Stadium in Pullman, Washington.

The team's statistical leaders included Timm Rosenbach with 2,446 passing yards, Richard Calvin with 822 rushing yards, and Steve Broussard with 701 receiving yards.

After nine years as WSU head coach, Jim Walden departed for Iowa State in the Big Eight Conference in late 1986, and was succeeded by Erickson, who returned to the Palouse in January 1987 after just one season at Wyoming; he had led neighboring Idaho for the previous four years. Wyoming visited Pullman in the second week of the season, a 15-point Cougar victory.

== Schedule ==
| Date | Opponent | Site | Result | Attendance | Source |
|---|---|---|---|---|---|
| September 5 | Fresno State* | Martin Stadium; Pullman, WA | W 41–24 | 22,971 | |
| September 12 | Wyoming* | Martin Stadium; Pullman, WA | W 43–28 | 24,151 | |
| September 19 | at No. 19 Michigan* | Michigan Stadium; Ann Arbor, MI | L 18–44 | 103,521 | |
| September 26 | at Colorado* | Folsom Field; Boulder, CO | L 17–26 | 43,527 | |
| October 10 | Stanford^{†} | Martin Stadium; Pullman, WA | L 7–44 | 31,538 | |
| October 17 | at Arizona State | Sun Devil Stadium; Tempe, AZ | L 7–38 | 70,341 | |
| October 24 | Arizona | Martin Stadium; Pullman, WA | W 45–28 | 22,269 | |
| October 31 | at USC | Los Angeles Memorial Coliseum; Los Angeles, CA | L 7–42 | 24,834 | |
| November 14 | Oregon | Martin Stadium; Pullman, WA | L 17–31 | 14,089 | |
| November 21 | at Washington | Husky Stadium; Seattle, WA (Apple Cup) | L 19–34 | 74,038 | |
| November 28 | vs. California | National Olympic Stadium; Tokyo, Japan (Coca-Cola Classic) | T 17–17 | 54,000 | |
*Non-conference game; ^{†}Homecoming; Rankings from AP Poll released prior to the game

== Roster ==
1987 Washington State Cougars football team roster
Players
Coaches
Offense

| Pos. | # | Name | Class |
|---|---|---|---|
| RB | 31 | Steve Broussard | So |
| FB | 22 | Richard Calvin | Sr |
| OT | 68 | Chris Dyko | Jr |
| QB | 12 | Brad Gossen | Fr |
| OT | 73 | John Husby | Jr |
| TE | 89 | Chris Leighton | Sr |
| G | 74 | Jim Michalczik | Jr |
| WR | 88 | William Pellum | Jr |
| QB | 3 | Timm Rosenbach | So |
| WR | 2 | Tim Stallworth | So |
| RB | 33 | Rich Swinton | Fr |
| WR | 36 | Elmer Thomas | Jr |
| G | 60 | Mike Utley | Jr |
| TE | 82 | Doug Wellsandt | So |
| WR | 13 | Victor Wood | Jr |
| C | 56 | Paul Wulff | So |

Defense

| Pos. | # | Name | Class |
|---|---|---|---|
| DE | 87 | Marvin Adams | Sr |
| LB | 55 | Tuineau Alipate | Jr |
| DE | 76 | Ivan Cook | Jr |
| DT | 97 | Tim Downing | So |
| LB | 57 | Brian Forde | Sr |
| DE | 96 | Randy Gray | So |
| CB | 41 | James Hasty | Sr |
| DE | 93 | Chris Hiller | Sr |
| SS | 19 | Artie Holmes | Jr |
| CB | 18 | Shawn Landrum | Jr |
| DB | 10 | Jay Languein | So |
| SS | 42 | Ron Lee | Jr |
| LB | 40 | Maury Metcalf | Jr |
| DB | 37 | Roosevelt Noble | So |
| DT | 75 | Tony Savage | So |
| LB | 21 | Neti Ulaga'ono |
| FS | 29 | Vernon Todd | Jr |

Special teams

| Pos. | # | Name | Class |
|---|---|---|---|
| PK | 4 | Kevin Adams | Sr |
| P | 45 | Rob Myers | So |

Head coach

- Dennis Erickson (1st year)

Coordinators/assistant coaches

- Bob Bratkowski – (OC)
- John L. Smith – (DC)

Legend

- (C) Team captain
- (S) Suspended
- (I) Ineligible
- Injured
- Redshirt

== NFL draft ==
Two Cougars were selected in the 1988 NFL draft.

| Player | Position | Round | Overall | Franchise |
|---|---|---|---|---|
| James Hasty | CB | 3 | 74 | New York Jets |
| Brian Forde | LB | 7 | 190 | New Orleans Saints |
