= All-purpose yardage =

Gridiron football statistical measure

All-purpose yards or all-purpose yardage is a gridiron football statistical measure. It is virtually the same as the statistic that some football leagues refer to as combined net yards. In the game of football, progress is measured by advancing the football towards the opposing team's goal line. Progress can be made during play by the offensive team by advancing the ball from its point of progress at the start of play known as the line of scrimmage or by the defensive team after taking possession of the football via a change of possession (such as punt, kickoff, interception, punt block, blocked kick or fumble). When the offensive team advances the ball by rushing the football, the player who carries the ball is given credit for the difference in progress measured in rushing yards. When the offensive team advances the ball by pass reception, the player who catches the reception is given credit for the difference in progress measured in reception yards. Although the ball may also be advanced by penalty, these yards are not considered all-purpose yards. Progress lost via quarterback sacks is classified variously. Thus, all-purpose yards is a combined total of rushing yards, receiving yards, and all forms of return yards only. Some sources do not specify which types of return yards count toward this total because the most common forms of return yards are kick and punt return yards.

Football associations differ on their own specific definitions of the term. The National Collegiate Athletic Association, for example, defines the term as "the combined net yards gained by rushing, receiving, interception (and fumble) returns, punt returns, kickoff returns and runbacks of field goal attempts. All-purpose yardage does not include forward passing yardage" (at pg. 206). The National Football League (NFL), however, defines combined net yards as "Rushing, receiving, interception returns, punt returns, kickoff returns, and fumble returns". Neither of these totals makes clear how they record yards from blocked punts recovered, blocked field goals, and missed field goal returns.

== Records by league ==
NCAA

Brian Westbrook holds the NCAA all-division record for career all-purpose yards, while Christian McCaffrey holds the single-season record.

NFL

Jerry Rice holds the NFL career combined net yards record with 23,546 yards, while Darren Sproles set the single-season record in the 2011 season with 2,696 yards. Glyn Milburn set the single-game record of 404 yards on 10 December 1995. Among active players, Derrick Henry leads the NFL in All-purpose yardage with 15,577 yards.

CFL

Pinball Clemons holds the Canadian Football League (CFL) record for career all-purpose yardage with 25,438 yards which also set a professional football record, while he had 25,610 yards combined between his CFL and NFL play. Chad Owens set a new single-season record during the 2012 season with 3,863 yards, which also set a new professional football record. On 27 October 2017, in a game against the Hamilton Tiger-Cats, Diontae Spencer set a new CFL single-game record with 496 all-purpose yards: 133 yards receiving, 165 kickoff return yards, 169 punt return yards and 29 missed field goal return yards.

== See also ==
- Glossary of American football
- List of National Football League career all-purpose yards leaders
