= Ben Hummel =

American football player (born 1966)

Ben Hummell
Profile
- Position: Linebacker

Personal information
- Born: August 22, 1966 (age 60); Dayton, Ohio, U.S.
- Listed height: 6 ft 4 in (1.93 m)
- Listed weight: 235 lb (107 kg)

Career information
- High school: Rockwall (Rockwall, Texas)
- College: SMU (1984-1986); UCLA (1987)
- NFL draft: 1988: 12th round, 317th overall pick

Career history
- Dallas Cowboys (1988)*; Ottawa Rough Riders (1988)
- * Offseason or practice squad member only

Career CFL statistics
- GP: 8
- Total tackles: 14
- Sacks: 8

Benjamin D. Hummel (born August 22, 1966) is an American former professional football linebacker. He played college football at UCLA. He was then selected by the Dallas Cowboys of the National Football League (NFL) in the 12th round of the 1988 NFL draft. He then played for the Ottawa Rough Riders of the Canadian Football League (CFL).

Hummel spent three years as a starting linebacker for SMU, but due to sanctions against the school for illegal payments to players, the teams 1987 season was canceled. He then decided to transfer to UCLA, a school he was recruit by before choosing SMU. Due to the rather unusual situation, the players were allowed to transfer without losing eligibility and without having to redshirt for a year.

Hummel was selected in the 12th round (317th overall) of the 1988 NFL draft by the Cowboys. On July 6, 1988, he signed his rookie contract with the Cowboys.
