= Don Parish (American football) =

American football player (1948–2018)

No. 57, 56, 51
- Position: Linebacker

Personal information
- Born: January 4, 1948; Beaumont, Texas, U.S.
- Died: May 9, 2018 (aged 70); Paso Robles, California, U.S.
- Listed height: 6 ft 1 in (1.85 m)
- Listed weight: 220 lb (100 kg)

Career information
- High school: Paso Robles (CA)
- College: Stanford
- NFL draft: 1970: 4th round, 91st overall pick

Career history
- St. Louis Cardinals (1970–1971); Los Angeles Rams (1971); St. Louis Cardinals (1972); Denver Broncos (1972)

Awards and highlights
- First-team All-American (1969); Pop Warner Trophy (1969); 2× First-team All-Pac-8 (1968, 1969)

Career NFL statistics
- Games played: 19
- Stats at Pro Football Reference

Donald Edward Parish (January 4, 1948 – May 9, 2018) was an American professional football linebacker. Parish played at Stanford, where he was the Pop Warner Trophy winner in 1969. He was chosen 91st overall in the fourth round of the 1970 NFL draft by the St. Louis Cardinals. Parish played three seasons for the Cardinals, Los Angeles Rams, and Denver Broncos.

He had three brothers, Kenneth, Cecil and John.

The St. Louis Quarterback Club selected Parish as the Cardinals' team Rookie of the Year in December 1970.

As a member of the Cardinal, Parish set the school record for single-game tackles against Oregon State in 1968, making 23 stops, a mark he would hold for 18 years until Dave Wyman surpassed it. As a senior, he was selected for first-team All-America honors by the AP, The Sporting News and Time.

In 1971, then-Stanford coach John Ralston called Parish "the finest linebacker" he had ever coached, adding: "In his three seasons (at Stanford), he has never given anything less than 110-percent effort."

Collegiate Statistics
Season	School	Tackles
1967 (So.)	STAN	71
1968 (Jr.)	STAN	143
1969 (Sr.)	STAN	141
Career	Total	355

He suffered from traumatic brain injury during his football days, his brother, Kenneth, told a reporter in 2021. Unhoused in Los Angeles for many years, Parish died at age 70 on May 9, 2018, in Paso Robles, California.

In June 2022, his alma mater, PRHS, named its football field in honor of Parish.
