= Phil Moffatt =

American football player (1908–1987)

Stanford Cardinal
- Position: Halfback

Personal information
- Born: February 17, 1908; Muskogee, Oklahoma, U.S.
- Died: May 16, 1987 (aged 79); Palo Alto, California, U.S.

Career information
- College: Stanford (1930)

Awards and highlights
- First-team All-American (1930)

Philip Julian Moffatt (February 17, 1908 – May 16, 1987) was an American football player. He played at the halfback position for the Stanford Cardinal football team. He was selected by the United Press as a first-team player on the 1930 College Football All-America Team. During World War II, he served in the United States Navy. Moffatt holds the Stanford records with 10 interceptions in a season and 20 in a career. He is third in all-time rushing at Stanford with an average of 5.9 yards per carry. He has been inducted into Stanford's Hall of Fame.

Moffatt received an economics degree from Stanford and worked in an executive position at General Motors in Sacramento, California. He died of a heart attack in 1987 at age 79.
