= Eric Abrams =

American football placekicker

Profile
- Position: Placekicker

Personal information
- Born: c. 1974; University City, California, U.S.
- Listed height: 5 ft 7 in (1.70 m)
- Listed weight: 160 lb (73 kg)

Career information
- High school: La Jolla (CA) Country Day
- College: Stanford
- NFL draft: 1996: undrafted

Career history
- San Jose SaberCats (1997)

Awards and highlights
- Third-team All-American (1995); First-team All-Pac-10 (1995)
- Stats at ArenaFan.com

Eric Abrams (born c. 1974) is a former Stanford placekicker.

== High school ==
Eric attended La Jolla Country Day School. The school at the time had played eight-man football. In his senior year, he was one of the top placekickers in the country, missing just 10 out of 189 extra points.

== College career ==
Eric attended Stanford University. He played under head coach Bill Walsh, who referred to Abrams as a "sweetheart". As a freshman, Abrams made 15 out of 17 field goal attempts and scored all 21 extra points. He replaced junior Aaron Mills. Abrams had a distinct look; he was about 5-foot-7, weighed 160 pounds, and wore a one-bar face mask. Due to his appearance, his teammates nicknamed him Gazoo, after the Flintstones character. Abrams became the leading scorer in Stanford football history by breaking John Hopkins' record.

== Professional career ==
Abrams was invited to the 1996 NFL Combine. He was not drafted. In 1997 Abrams played for the San Jose SaberCats of the Arena Football League. He was cut after the first regular season game where he only made one of five field-goals.

== Molestation charges ==
July 1997: Abrams, while posing as a Nike representative, called a 14-year-old boy and told him he won a contest. Abrams allegedly picked up the boy and drove him back to his house. There he convinced the boy to undress for the purposes of being measured for Nike's merchandise. The boy became uncomfortable and Abrams allowed him to leave. He was charged with false imprisonment and child molestation. Abrams pled no contest and was sentenced to two years in prison.

December 19, 1997: Abrams posed as a talent scout towards a boy on a plane. Abrams asked for the boy's name and phone number and called him, telling the child he won tickets. A meeting never took place and Abrams was charged with one felony count of attempted false imprisonment.

April 14, 1998: Abrams, pretending to be a law officer and flashing a fake badge, coaxed a 13-year-old boy into his car and ordered the boy to remove his clothes for a strip search. Reports suggest two other boys were asked to go into Abrams' car that night.
