= Tyler Gaffney =

American football and baseball player (born 1991)

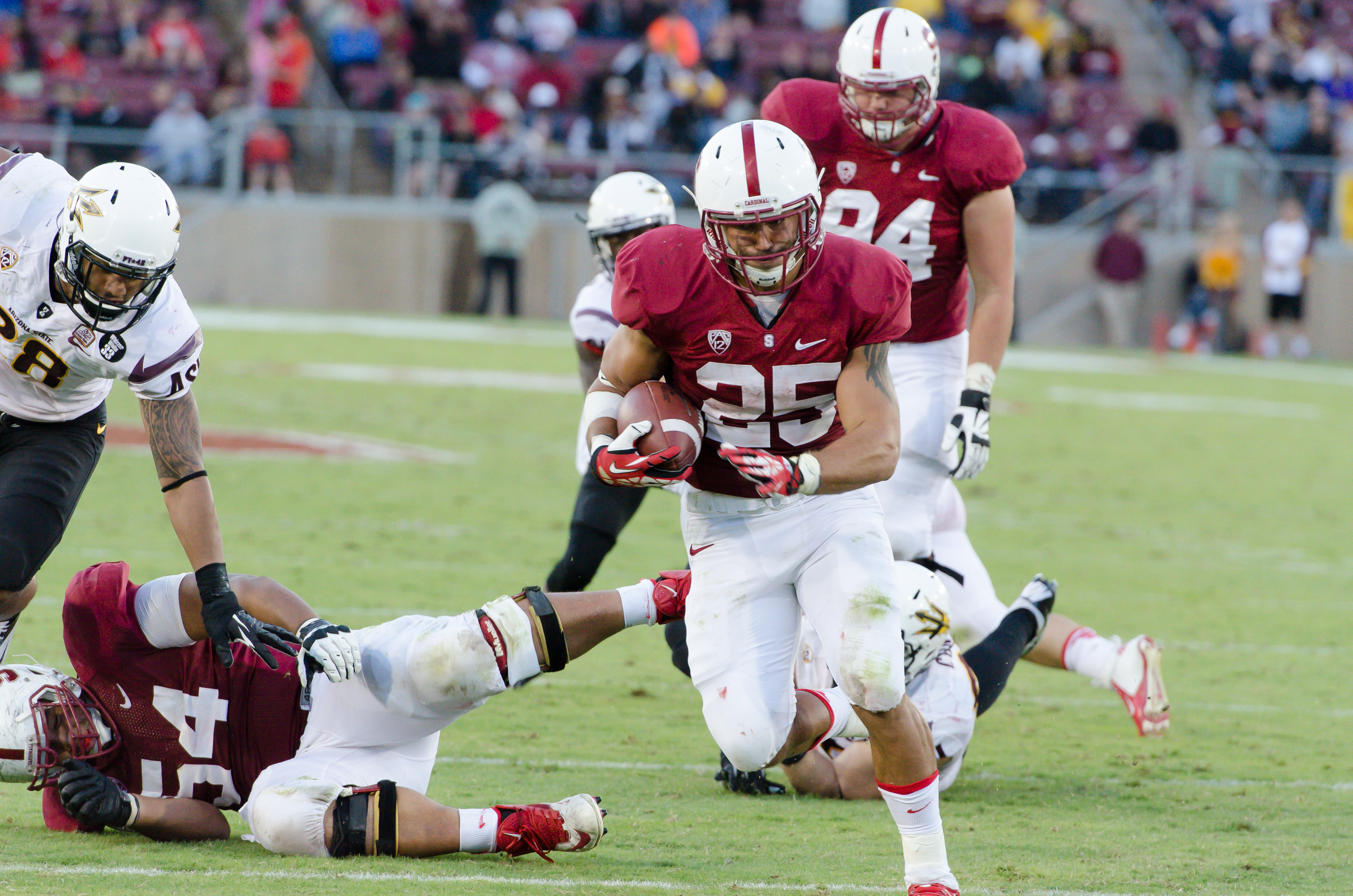
- Gaffney with the Stanford Cardinal in 2013

No. 34, 35
- Position: Running back

Personal information
- Born: April 20, 1991 (age 35); San Diego, California, U.S.
- Listed height: 6 ft 0 in (1.83 m)
- Listed weight: 220 lb (100 kg)

Career information
- High school: Cathedral Catholic (San Diego)
- College: Stanford
- NFL draft: 2014: 6th round, 204th overall pick

Career history
- Carolina Panthers (2014)*; New England Patriots (2014–2016); Jacksonville Jaguars (2017); San Francisco 49ers (2020)*; New England Patriots (2021)*
- * Offseason or practice squad member only

Awards and highlights
- 2× Super Bowl champion (XLIX, LI); Second-team All-American (2013); Second-team All-Pac-12 (2013)
- Stats at Pro Football Reference

Tyler Gaffney (born April 20, 1991) is an American former professional football running back and former professional baseball outfielder. He was selected by the Carolina Panthers in the sixth round of the 2014 NFL draft. He played college football and college baseball for the Stanford Cardinal. He also played for the New England Patriots and Jacksonville Jaguars in the National Football League (NFL).

Gaffney was picked by the Pittsburgh Pirates in the 24th round of the 2012 MLB draft and went on to play two seasons of minor league baseball.

== Early life ==
Gaffney attended Cathedral Catholic High School in San Diego. During his high school football career, he rushed for 5,547 yards with 99 total touchdowns.

== Football career ==
=== College ===
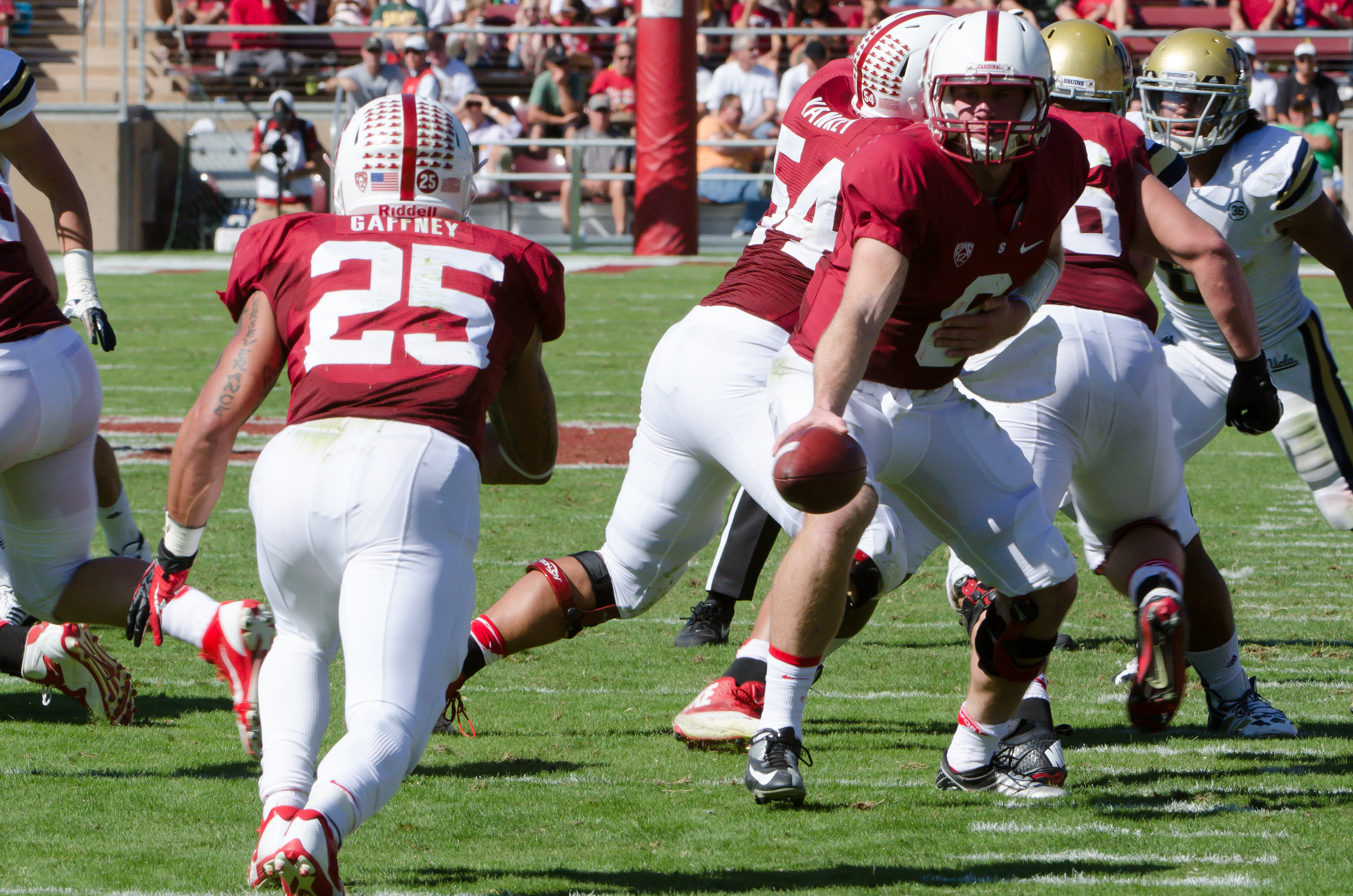
Gaffney receiving a handoff from Kevin Hogan in 2013.

As a true freshman in 2009, Gaffney played in 12 games, rushing for 87 yards on 22 carries with a touchdown. As a sophomore in 2010, he played in 10 of 13 games, missing three games due to injury. He finished the season with 255 yards on 60 carries and four touchdowns. As a junior in 2011, he played in 13 games rushing for 449 yards on 74 carries with seven touchdowns. After spending a season playing professional baseball, he returned to the team in 2013. Gaffney had an outstanding year in 2013. He started in 14 games finishing with 330 rushing attempts, 1709 rushing yards, and 21 rushing touchdowns.

=== Professional ===
Pre-draft measurables
Height	Weight	Arm length	Hand span	40-yard dash	10-yard split	20-yard split	20-yard shuttle	Three-cone drill	Vertical jump	Broad jump	Bench press
5 ft 11 1/2 in (1.82 m)	220 lb (100 kg)	30 1/4 in (0.77 m)	9 in (0.23 m)	4.49 s	1.51 s	2.58 s	4.18 s	6.78 s	36.5 in (0.93 m)	9 ft 8 in (2.95 m)	15 reps

==== Carolina Panthers ====
Gaffney was selected by the Carolina Panthers with the 204th pick in the 2014 NFL draft. While he was originally slated to compete for the third running back spot on the roster with second-year runner Kenjon Barner, on July 26, 2014, Gaffney went down with a torn lateral meniscus in his left knee during training camp. As a result of the injury, he was waived.

==== New England Patriots (first stint) ====
On July 28, 2014, Gaffney was claimed off waivers by the New England Patriots. On August 26, 2014, Gaffney was placed on injured reserve. Gaffney won Super Bowl XLIX with the Patriots after they defeated the defending champion Seattle Seahawks 28–24.

Gaffney was waived on August 12, 2015. Since he went unclaimed, he and his contract through 2016 reverted to the Patriots. Gaffney was placed on injured reserve on August 13.

In order to revise Gaffney's contract, the Patriots released Gaffney on April 11, 2016; after clearing waivers, he was re-signed on April 14.

On September 3, 2016, Gaffney was waived/injured and was placed on injured reserve after clearing waivers. On September 9, 2016, he was released from injured reserve with an injury settlement. On October 17, 2016, he was re-signed to their practice squad and was promoted to the active roster on October 29, 2016. On November 10, 2016, Gaffney was waived again and was re-signed to the practice squad two days later.

On February 5, 2017, Gaffney won his second Super Bowl championship when the Patriots won Super Bowl LI. In the game, the Patriots defeated the Atlanta Falcons by a score of 34–28 in overtime.

On February 7, 2017, Gaffney signed a futures contract with the Patriots. On March 20, 2017, Gaffney was released.

==== Jacksonville Jaguars ====
On August 2, 2017, Gaffney was signed by the Jacksonville Jaguars. He was waived/injured on August 11, 2017, and placed on injured reserve.

After his football career had been derailed by injuries, Gaffney announced his retirement in March 2018 to resume his professional baseball career. Gaffney had a tryout with the Houston Texans on August 20, 2020.

==== San Francisco 49ers ====
On December 22, 2020, Gaffney signed with the practice squad of the San Francisco 49ers. He was released on January 6, 2021.

==== New England Patriots (second stint) ====
On May 21, 2021, Gaffney signed with the Patriots. He was released on August 10, 2021.

== Baseball career ==
Tyler Gaffney
- Outfielder
- Bats: Right Throws: Right
- Stats at Baseball Reference

=== 2012 ===
Gaffney played three years of college baseball as an outfielder at Stanford. During the three years he hit .300/.405/.427 with eight home runs. He was drafted by the Pittsburgh Pirates in the 24th round of the 2012 Major League Baseball draft. He played in 38 games for the State College Spikes that year, hitting .297/.483/.441. After the season, he returned to football.

=== 2018 ===
Gaffney returned to baseball for the 2018 season after moving on from the NFL, joining the Pittsburgh Pirates' minor league affiliate Bradenton Marauders. In 89 games between the Pirates' High-A Bradenton and Double-A Altoona affiliates, he batted .244 with six homers and 36 RBIs.

He retired from baseball on February 23, 2019.

== Personal life ==
Gaffney is married to Kristen Rorie. They have two sons and two daughters.
