= Mark Bradford (American football) =

American football player (born 1984)

No. 83
- Position: Wide receiver

Personal information
- Born: October 7, 1984 (age 42); Los Angeles, California
- Listed height: 6 ft 2 in (1.88 m)
- Listed weight: 205 lb (93 kg)

Career information
- College: Stanford
- NFL draft: 2008: undrafted

Career history
- Dallas Cowboys (2008)*; San Francisco 49ers (2008–2009)*; California Redwoods (2009)
- * Offseason or practice squad member only

Mark Bradford (born October 7, 1984) is an American former professional football wide receiver. He played for the California Redwoods of the United Football League, and was signed by the Dallas Cowboys of the NFL as an undrafted free agent in 2008. He played college football at Stanford.

Bradford was also a member of the San Francisco 49ers.

== Early life ==
Bradford graduated in 2003 from Fremont High School in Los Angeles, California and was one of the best receivers in the nation at the time, being ranked by PrepStar as the No.4 wide receiver in the country and as the No. 1 in the west. Not only talented as a wide receiver on the grid iron, Bradford was able to showcase his skills on the basketball court and was a two-time All-City selection in both sports. Mark played basketball for the Stanford Cardinal during his freshman and sophomore years of college but then quit to focus on football.
