= Brian Habib =

American football player (born 1964)

No. 74, 75, 68
- Positions: Tackle, guard

Personal information
- Born: December 2, 1964 (age 61); Ellensburg, Washington, U.S.
- Listed height: 6 ft 7 in (2.01 m)
- Listed weight: 299 lb (136 kg)

Career information
- High school: Ellensburg
- College: Washington
- NFL draft: 1988: 10th round, 264th overall pick

Career history
- Minnesota Vikings (1988–1992); Denver Broncos (1993–1997); Seattle Seahawks (1998–1999)

Awards and highlights
- Super Bowl champion (XXXII)

Career NFL statistics
- Games played: 174
- Games started: 133
- Fumble recoveries: 3
- Stats at Pro Football Reference

Brian Habib (born December 2, 1964) is an American former professional football player who played offensive lineman for 11 seasons for the Minnesota Vikings, Denver Broncos, and Seattle Seahawks. He was selected by the Vikings in the tenth round of the 1988 NFL draft. With the Broncos, he won Super Bowl XXXII.

Pre-draft measurables
| Height | Weight | Hand span | 40-yard dash | 10-yard split | 20-yard split | 20-yard shuttle | Vertical jump | Broad jump | Bench press |
|---|---|---|---|---|---|---|---|---|---|
| 6 ft 6 3/4 in (2.00 m) | 273 lb (124 kg) | 10 in (0.25 m) | 5.01 s | 1.76 s | 2.87 s | 4.84 s | 28.5 in (0.72 m) | 8 ft 11 in (2.72 m) | 34 reps |

Habib currently is an offensive line coach for Del Norte High School in Poway, California. He also works as a real estate agent serving the Poway, Rancho Bernardo, and 4S Ranch neighborhoods of San Diego, California.
