= Troy Walters =

American football player and coach (born 1976)

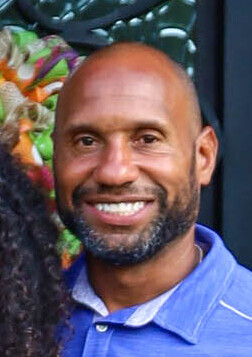
- Walters in 2021

Cincinnati Bengals
- Title: Wide receivers coach

Personal information
- Born: December 15, 1976 (age 49); Bloomington, Indiana, U.S.
- Listed height: 5 ft 6 in (1.68 m)
- Listed weight: 171 lb (78 kg)

Career information
- Position: Wide receiver (No. 82, 86, 17)
- High school: A&M Consolidated (College Station, Texas)
- College: Stanford
- NFL draft: 2000: 5th round, 165th overall pick

Career history

Playing
- Minnesota Vikings (2000–2001); Indianapolis Colts (2002–2005); Arizona Cardinals (2006); Detroit Lions (2007)

Coaching
- Indiana State (2009) Offensive coordinator/quarterbacks coach/wide receivers coach; Texas A&M (2010–2011) Wide receivers coach; NC State (2012) Wide receivers coach; Colorado (2013–2015) Wide receivers coach/recruiting coordinator; UCF (2016–2017) Offensive coordinator/wide receivers coach; Nebraska (2018–2019) Offensive coordinator/wide receivers coach; Cincinnati Bengals (2020) Assistant wide receivers coach; Cincinnati Bengals (2021–present) Wide receivers coach

Awards and highlights
- Consensus All-American (1999); Fred Biletnikoff Award (1999); Pac-10 Offensive Player of the Year (1999); 2× First-team All-Pac-10 (1997, 1999); Second-team All-Pac-10 (1998)

Career NFL statistics
- Receptions: 102
- Receiving yards: 1,135
- Receiving touchdowns: 9
- Stats at Pro Football Reference

Troy McHenry Walters (born December 15, 1976) is an American football coach and former player who is the wide receivers coach for the Cincinnati Bengals of the National Football League (NFL). Walters played as a wide receiver and punt returner in the NFL for eight seasons. Walters played college football for the Stanford Cardinal, earning consensus All-American honors and winning the Fred Biletnikoff Award as the season's outstanding college football receiver. He was selected in the fifth round of the 2000 NFL draft by the Minnesota Vikings, and also played for the Indianapolis Colts, Arizona Cardinals and Detroit Lions of the NFL.

== Early life ==
Walters was born in Bloomington, Indiana. His father Trent Walters was a three-year letterman at Indiana and played two seasons in the CFL with the Edmonton Eskimos. He attended A&M Consolidated High School in College Station, Texas, and was a letterman in football, basketball and track. In football, as a senior, he was named to the Texas Magazine First-team; he also was a second-team All-Greater Houston selection and a third-team all-state selection.

== College career ==
After accepting an athletic scholarship to attend Stanford University, Walters played for the Stanford Cardinal football team from 1996 to 1999. As a senior in 1999, he was recognized as consensus first-team All-American and won the Fred Biletnikoff Award. He finished his college career with 244 catches and over 3,900 receiving yards, and currently ranks as Stanford's all-time leader in receptions and receiving yards.

== Professional career ==
Pre-draft measurables
Height	Weight	Arm length	Hand span	20-yard shuttle	Three-cone drill	Vertical jump	Broad jump
5 ft 6 1/2 in (1.69 m)	171 lb (78 kg)	28 1/2 in (0.72 m)	9 in (0.23 m)	3.84 s	6.61 s	32.5 in (0.83 m)	8 ft 10 in (2.69 m)
All values from NFL Combine

The Minnesota Vikings selected Walters in the fifth round (165th pick overall) of the 2000 NFL draft, and he played for the Vikings from 2000 to 2001. His father was on the coaching staff during his time with the Vikings. He subsequently played for the Indianapolis Colts (2002–2005), Arizona Cardinals (2006) and Detroit Lions (2007). During his eight-season NFL career, he played in 98 games, compiled 102 receptions for 1,135 yards and nine touchdowns, returned 117 kickoffs for 2,594 yards, and returned 139 punts for 1,241 yards.

== NFL career statistics ==
Legend
**Bold**	Career high

=== Regular season ===
Year	Team	Games		Receiving					
Year	Team	GP	GS	Tgt	Rec	Yds	Avg	Lng	TD
2000	MIN	12	0	1	1	5	5.0	5	0
2001	MIN	6	0	0	0	0	0.0	0	0
2002	IND	16	1	25	18	207	11.5	27	0
2003	IND	15	4	**52**	**36**	**456**	**12.7**	**46**	**3**
2004	IND	5	0	1	1	5	5.0	5	0
2005	IND	16	1	19	14	152	10.9	39	**3**
2006	ARI	15	3	35	23	209	9.1	26	2
2007	DET	13	0	10	9	101	11.2	21	1
		98	9	143	102	1,135	11.1	46	9

=== Postseason ===
Year	Team	Games		Receiving					
Year	Team	GP	GS	Tgt	Rec	Yds	Avg	Lng	TD
2000	MIN	2	0	1	1	7	7.0	7	0
2002	IND	1	0	4	1	17	**17.0**	**17**	0
2003	IND	2	0	**6**	**6**	**31**	5.2	11	0
2004	IND	2	0	1	0	0	0.0	0	0
2005	IND	1	0	0	0	0	0.0	0	0
		8	0	12	8	55	6.9	17	0

== Coaching career ==
Walters joined the staff at Indiana State University as their offensive coordinator, quarterbacks coach, and wide receivers coach. He then left to become the wide receivers coach at Texas A&M University from 2010 to 2011. He then had stints at North Carolina State University in 2012, and at the University of Colorado Boulder from 2013 to 2015 as a wide receivers coach.

Walters joined Scott Frost's staff at the University of Central Florida as offensive coordinator and wide receivers coach in 2016. Walters was a finalist for the Broyles Award, presented to the top assistant coach in college football in December 2017.

Walters followed Frost to Nebraska to become the offensive coordinator and wide receivers coach in December 2017. On January 17, 2020, the University of Nebraska and Walters parted ways.

Walters was hired by the Cincinnati Bengals as their assistant wide receivers coach on February 10, 2020. He assumed Bob Bicknell's wide receivers coaching duties for the team's weeks 10 and 11 games in 2020 against the Pittsburgh Steelers and Washington Football Team due to Bicknell missing the games for COVID-19 pandemic protocols.
