= Dave Wyman =

American football player (born 1964)

No. 92, 57
- Position: Linebacker

Personal information
- Born: March 31, 1964 (age 62); San Diego, California, U.S.
- Listed height: 6 ft 2 in (1.88 m)
- Listed weight: 248 lb (112 kg)

Career information
- High school: Reno (NV) Earl Wooster
- College: Stanford
- NFL draft: 1987: 2nd round, 45th overall pick

Career history
- Seattle Seahawks (1987–1992); Denver Broncos (1993–1995)

Awards and highlights
- Pop Warner Trophy (1986); First-team All-Pac-10 (1986); 2× Second-team All-Pac-10 (1983, 1984)

Career NFL statistics
- Tackles: 553
- Sacks: 5.5
- Interceptions: 3
- Stats at Pro Football Reference

David Matthew Wyman (born March 31, 1964) is an American former professional football player, a linebacker in the National Football League (NFL) for nine seasons with the Seattle Seahawks and Denver Broncos.

== Early life ==
Born in San Diego, California, Wyman attended Earl Wooster High School in Reno, Nevada, and graduated in 1982. He played college football at Stanford University, where he led the team in tackles as a sophomore in 1983 and again in 1984, but incurred a knee injury in the penultimate game. Wyman redshirted in 1985 and returned in 1986 to lead the Cardinal with 169 tackles and was All-Pac-10.

== Professional career ==
Pre-draft measurables
Height	Weight	Arm length	Hand span	40-yard dash	10-yard split	20-yard split	20-yard shuttle	Vertical jump	Broad jump	Bench press
6 ft 2 in (1.88 m)	235 lb (107 kg)	31 1/4 in (0.79 m)	9 1/2 in (0.24 m)	4.79 s	1.65 s	2.75 s	4.30 s	29.0 in (0.74 m)	9 ft 10 in (3.00 m)	23 reps
All values from NFL Combine

Wyman was selected by the Seahawks in the second round of the 1987 NFL draft with the 45th overall selection. Midway through his rookie year in 1987, he was traded to the San Francisco 49ers, but a failed physical due to a bad left shoulder nullified it. Wyman played six seasons for the Seahawks, but left as a free agent before the 1993 season and played his final three years with the Broncos.

Wyman and Brian Bosworth were next-door neighbors on the Eastside while they were teammates with the Seahawks.

== After football ==
Wyman returned to the Seattle area and is a popular co-host of the afternoon radio show Wyman and Bob on KIRO 710, part of the ESPN Radio network. He is a frequent contributor to Seahawks Saturday Night on KCPQ television, the Seattle Fox affiliate.

Wyman took over as the Seahawks radio analyst for the final four regular season games in December 2017 after Warren Moon took an indefinite leave of absence to resolve a sexual harassment case against him. In 2018, Wyman permanently replaced Moon on Seahawks radio.

== Personal life ==
Wyman married Shannen Forrest of Edmonds in May 1993; they met while she was a member of the Sea Gals and they have two children.

Older brother Mike Wyman also played college football at Stanford, as a defensive tackle; both started for the Cardinal defense in 1983.
