= Chris Walsh (American football) =

American football player (born 1968)

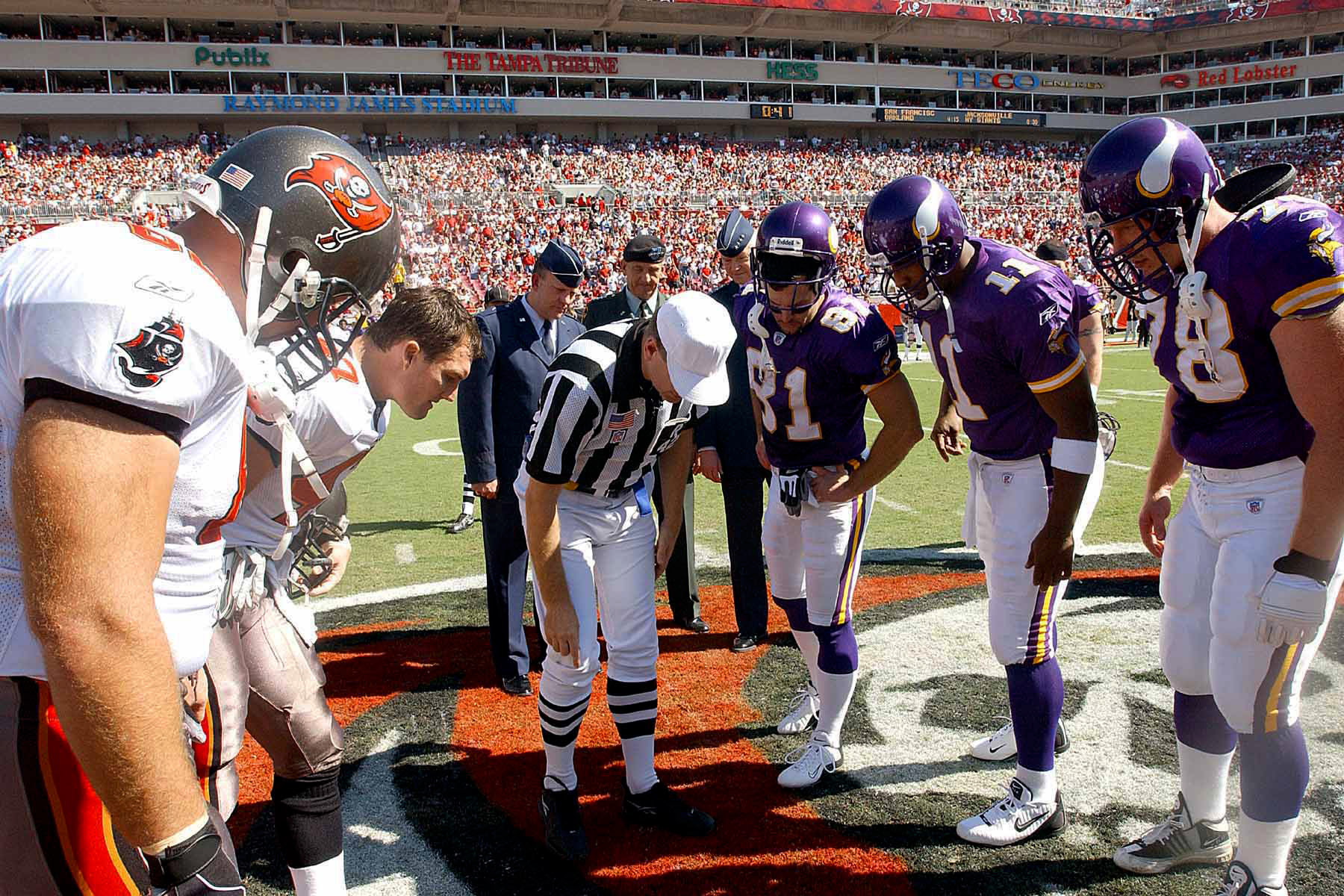
- Walsh (#81) in 2002

No. 87, 81
- Position: Wide receiver

Personal information
- Born: December 12, 1968 (age 57); Cleveland, Ohio, U.S.
- Listed height: 6 ft 1 in (1.85 m)
- Listed weight: 199 lb (90 kg)

Career information
- High school: Ygnacio Valley (Concord, California)
- College: Stanford (1988–1991)
- NFL draft: 1992: 9th round, 251st overall pick

Career history
- Buffalo Bills (1992–1993); Minnesota Vikings (1994–2002)

Awards and highlights
- Minnesota Vikings All-Mall of America Field Team; Second-team All-Pac-10 (1991)

Career NFL statistics
- Receptions: 67
- Receiving yards: 719
- Receiving touchdowns: 4
- Stats at Pro Football Reference

Christopher Lee Walsh (born December 12, 1968) is an American former professional football player who was a wide receiver for 11 seasons in the National Football League (NFL) for the Buffalo Bills and Minnesota Vikings. He played college football for the Stanford Cardinal and was selected in the ninth round of the 1992 NFL draft by the Bills with the 251st overall pick. Nicknamed "the Undertaker", Walsh once played an entire game with a broken jaw. He also was known for giving back to the community by visiting with fans and signing autographs at local Minnesota McDonald's restaurants.

== Lawsuit against the NFL ==
In December 2011, Walsh made headlines when he and a group of 11 other former professional players filed a lawsuit against the NFL. Walsh and his attorneys allege that the League failed to properly treat head injuries in spite of prevailing medical evidence, leading the players to develop effects of brain injury ranging from chronic headaches to depression.
