= Glyn Milburn =

American football player and administrator (born 1971)

No. 5, 22, 33, 24
- Positions: Running back, wide receiver, return specialist

Personal information
- Born: February 19, 1971 (age 55); Los Angeles, California, U.S.
- Listed height: 5 ft 8 in (1.73 m)
- Listed weight: 177 lb (80 kg)

Career information
- High school: Santa Monica (Santa Monica, California)
- College: Stanford
- NFL draft: 1993: 2nd round, 43rd overall pick

Career history

Playing
- Denver Broncos (1993–1995); Detroit Lions (1996–1997); Green Bay Packers (1998)*; Chicago Bears (1998–2001); San Diego Chargers (2001)
- * Offseason or practice squad member only

Operations
- Austin Wranglers (2004–2008) General manager

Awards and highlights
- First-team All-Pro (1999); Second-team All-Pro (1995); 2× Pro Bowl (1995, 1999); NFL kickoff return yards leader (1998); First-team All-American (1992); Pop Warner Trophy (1992); 2× First-team All-Pac-10 (1990, 1992); Second-team All-Pac-10 (1991)

Career NFL statistics
- Return touchdowns: 3
- Punt return yards: 2,984
- Kick return yards: 9,788
- Stats at Pro Football Reference

Glyn Curt Milburn (born February 19, 1971) is an American former professional football player who was a running back and return specialist for nine seasons in the National Football League (NFL). After playing college football for the Stanford Cardinal, he was selected by the Denver Broncos in the second round of the 1993 NFL draft. He also played for the Detroit Lions, Chicago Bears, and San Diego Chargers. He holds the NFL record for most all-purpose yards gained in a single game with 404 on December 10, 1995. He was also the Chicago Bears all-time leading kick returner with 4,596 yards. He was selected to the Pro Bowl twice in 1995 and 1999, and was named first-team All-Pro in 1999. After his playing career ended, he was the General Manager and the Director of Player Personnel for the Austin Wranglers in the Arena Football League from 2004 to 2008.

== College career ==
Milburn attended the University of Oklahoma in 1988 and Stanford University from 1990 to 1992.

== Professional career ==
=== Denver Broncos ===
Milburn was selected by the Denver Broncos in the second round (43rd overall) of the 1993 NFL draft. He tied the Broncos' franchise record for kick returns in a playoff game with 6 against the Los Angeles Raiders on January 9, 1994. In 1995, he set the Broncos' franchise records for kick return yards in a season with 1,269, and total return yards in a season with 1,623. On December 10, 1995, he set an NFL record for all-purpose yards in a game with 404 total yards.

=== Detroit Lions ===
By the end of the 1995 season, Terrell Davis had established himself as the Broncos starting running back, and Milburn was traded to the Detroit Lions for second- (58th overall) and seventh-round picks in the 1996 NFL draft. Milburn played in 32 regular season games for the Lions.

=== Green Bay Packers ===
The Green Bay Packers acquired Milburn in a trade with the Lions in April 1998. He participated in the Packers preseason activities, but on August 29, 1998, he was traded to the Chicago Bears in exchange for a seventh round draft pick (later used to select wide receiver Donald Driver).

=== Chicago Bears ===
Playing for the Bears from 1998 to 2001, Milburn set the franchise record for kickoff return yards with 4,596, though he was eventually passed by Devin Hester.

=== San Diego Chargers ===
On November 9, 2001, the San Diego Chargers signed Milburn. He played in six games and was used primarily as a punt returner.

== NFL career statistics ==
Receiving Stats

Year	Team	GP	Rec	Yds	Avg	Lng	TD	FD	Fum	Lost
1993	DEN	16	38	300	7.9	50	3	13	2	1
1994	DEN	16	77	549	7.1	33	3	29	0	0
1995	DEN	16	22	191	8.7	23	0	9	0	0
1997	DET	16	5	77	15.4	43	0	2	0	0
1998	CHI	16	4	37	9.3	13	0	2	0	0
1999	CHI	16	20	151	7.6	22	0	7	1	0
2000	CHI	16	1	8	8.0	8	0	0	0	0
2001	CHI	4	3	9	3.0	7	0	0	0	0
Career		116	170	1,322	7.8	50	6	62	3	1

Returning Stats

Year	Team	GP	PRet	Yds	TD	FC	Lng	KRet	Yds	TD	Lng
1993	DEN	16	40	425	0	11	54	12	188	0	26
1994	DEN	16	41	379	0	4	44	37	793	0	40
1995	DEN	16	31	354	0	17	44	47	1,269	0	86
1996	DET	16	34	284	0	19	33	64	1,627	0	65
1997	DET	16	47	433	0	26	40	55	1,315	0	69
1998	CHI	16	25	291	1	15	93	62	1,550	2	94
1999	CHI	16	30	346	0	19	54	61	1,426	0	93
2000	CHI	16	35	300	0	26	25	63	1,468	0	38
2001	CHI	4	4	33	0	3	20	6	152	0	37
2001	SD	6	17	139	0	4	19	0	0	0	0
Career		138	304	2,984	1	144	93	407	9,788	2	94

Rushing Stats

Year	Team	GP	Att	Yds	Avg	Lng	TD	FD	Fum	Lost
1993	DEN	16	52	231	4.4	26	0	14	1	1
1994	DEN	16	58	201	3.5	20	1	10	1	1
1995	DEN	16	49	266	5.4	29	0	10	1	1
1998	CHI	16	4	8	2.0	3	0	0	0	0
1999	CHI	16	16	102	6.4	49	1	5	0	0
2000	CHI	16	1	6	6.0	6	0	0	0	0
2001	CHI	4	3	3	1.0	4	0	0	0	0
Career		100	183	817	4.5	49	2	39	3	3
