= John Hopkins (American football) =

American football player

John Hopkins (born c. 1969) is a former college football placekicker who played for Stanford University from 1987 to 1990.

Hopkins' biggest game at Stanford was also his last: the 93rd Big Game, played on November 17, 1990. In the game, Stanford scored with twelve seconds left but still trailed Cal 25–24. Hopkins kicked an onside kick which Stanford recovered. On the next play, Cal was cited for roughing quarterback Jason Palumbis. Hopkins came in and connected on a 39-yard field goal as time expired to give Stanford a 27–25 victory. The kick also gave Hopkins the Stanford record for most field goals in a game with 5. He also still holds the record for most field goals in a season, having kicked 19 of 24 field goals in the 1988 season.
