= Steve Stenstrom =

American football player (born 1971)

No. 18
- Position: Quarterback

Personal information
- Born: December 23, 1971 (age 54); El Toro, California, U.S.
- Listed height: 6 ft 2 in (1.88 m)
- Listed weight: 202 lb (92 kg)

Career information
- High school: El Toro
- College: Stanford
- NFL draft: 1995: 4th round, 134th overall pick

Career history
- Kansas City Chiefs (1995); Chicago Bears (1995–1998); San Francisco 49ers (1999); Detroit Lions (2000)*; Denver Broncos (2001)*
- * Offseason or practice squad member only

Awards and highlights
- Pop Warner Trophy (1994); 2× Second-team All-Pac-10 (1993, 1994)

Career NFL statistics
- Passing attempts: 314
- Passing completions: 177
- Completion percentage: 56.4%
- TD–INT: 4–12
- Passing yards: 1,895
- Passer rating: 62.5
- Stats at Pro Football Reference

Steve Stenstrom (born December 23, 1971) is an American former professional football player who was a quarterback in the National Football League (NFL). He played college football for the Stanford Cardinal. He was selected in the fourth round of the 1995 NFL draft.

== College career ==
Stenstrom attended Stanford University where he was a member of Sigma Nu fraternity. Stenstrom was the starting quarterback at Stanford University from 1991 to 1994, and still holds many of Stanford's passing records:

- Total yards, career: 9,825
- Passing yards gained, career: 10,531
- Passing yards gained, season: 3,627 (1993)
- Pass attempts, career: 1,320
- Pass attempts, season: 455 (1993)
- Pass completions, career: 833
- Pass completions, season: 300 (1993)
- Completion percentage, game: .882 (15/17) (1991)

== NFL career ==
Stenstrom was selected by the Kansas City Chiefs in the fourth round of the 1995 NFL draft with the 134th overall pick. Stenstrom played in five NFL seasons from 1996 to 1999 for the Chicago Bears and San Francisco 49ers. He started seven games for the Bears during the 1998 season, as well as three games for the 49ers during the 1999 season after Steve Young's career-ending injury. He spent a partial season with the Detroit Lions in 2000 and then signed on with the Denver Broncos in the spring of 2001 where he retired from the NFL shortly thereafter.

== After football ==
Following his football career, Stenstrom returned to Stanford University to lead the Cardinal Life Christian ministry for athletes and along with his wife, Lori, established a program in the San Francisco Bay Area called 2nd Mile. Stenstrom is now the President of Pro Athletes Outreach (PAO), a Christian outreach program for coaches, players, and professional athletes.

His son Blake played quarterback for Princeton from 2019 to 2023, while daughter Brooke swam for Stanford from 2016 to 2020 before coaching the swim team at Valor Christian High School. His youngest daughters, Lindsay and Ashley, have swum for UCLA.

== See also ==
- List of Division I FBS passing yardage leaders
