= Oregon State Beavers football statistical leaders =

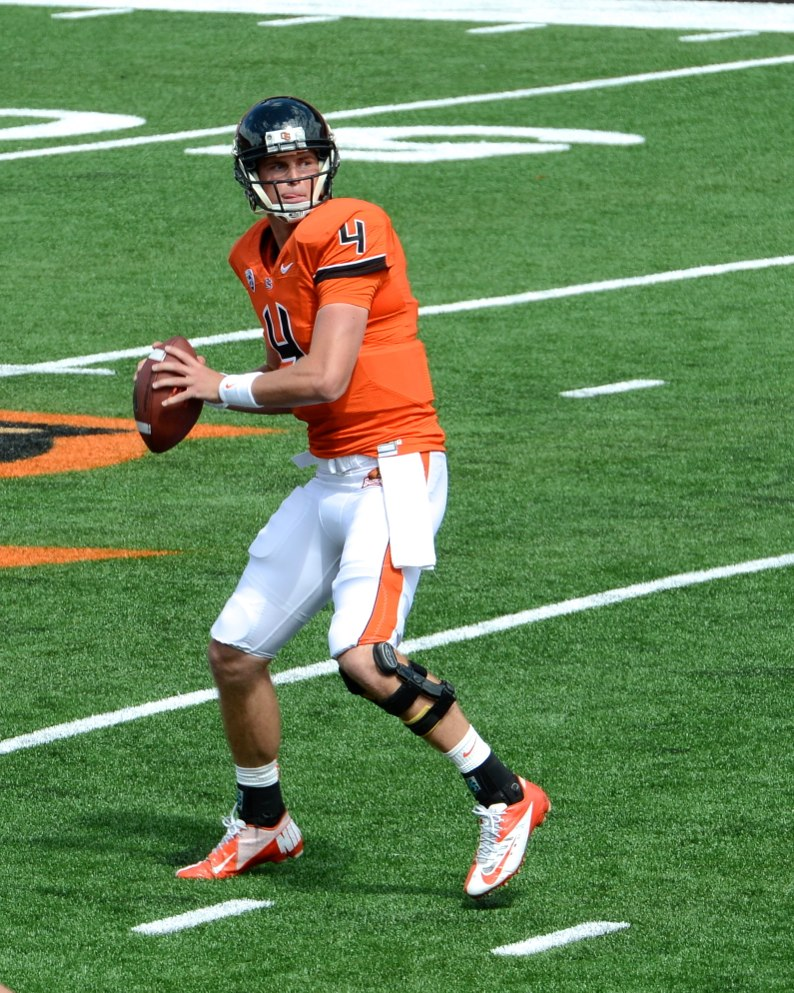
Sean Mannion holds all Oregon State passing records.

The Oregon State Beavers football statistical leaders are individual statistical leaders of the Oregon State Beavers football program in various categories, including passing, rushing, receiving, total offense, defensive stats, and kicking. Within those areas, the lists identify single-game, single-season, and career leaders. The Beavers represent Oregon State University in the NCAA Division I FBS Pac-12 Conference.

Although Oregon State began competing in intercollegiate football in 1893, the school's official record book doesn't generally list statistics from before the 1950s, as records from before this year are often incomplete and inconsistent.

These lists are dominated by more recent players for several reasons:

- Since the 1950s, seasons have increased from 10 games to 11 and then 12 games in length.
- The NCAA did not allow freshmen to play varsity football until 1972 (with the exception of the World War II years), allowing players to have four-year careers.
- Bowl games only began counting toward single-season and career statistics in 2002. The Beavers have played in 9 bowl games since this decision, allowing many recent players an extra game to accumulate statistics.
- Due to COVID-19 issues, the NCAA ruled that the 2020 season would not count against the athletic eligibility of any football player, giving everyone who played in that season the opportunity for five years of eligibility instead of the then-normal four.
- From 2018 through 2025, FBS players were allowed to participate in as many as four games in a redshirt season; previously, playing in even one game "burned" the redshirt. In 2024 and 2025, postseason games did not count against the four-game limit. These changes to redshirt rules gave players during this period several extra games to accumulate statistics.
- A more recent change that will have a major effect on future career leaderboards was introduced in 2026 with full implementation starting with the 2027 freshman class. Going forward, redshirting will be prohibited, but players will have five years of full athletic eligibility, provided that they are no older than 19 when they first enroll in a postsecondary institution. Players who had remaining eligibility under previous rules at the end of the 2025 season will benefit from the new rule.

These lists are updated through Week 12 of the 2026 season. Active players are listed in bold.

== Passing ==
=== Passing yards ===
Career
Rank	Player	Yards	Years
1	Sean Mannion	13,600	2011 2012 2013 2014
2	Derek Anderson	11,249	2001 2002 2003 2004
3	Jonathan Smith	9,680	1998 1999 2000 2001
4	Erik Wilhelm	9,383	1985 1986 1987 1988
5	Sean Canfield	5,970	2006 2007 2008 2009
6	Matt Moore	5,733	2005 2006
7	Jake Luton	5,227	2017 2018 2019
8	Chance Nolan	4,153	2020 2021 2022
9	Terry Baker	3,476	1960 1961 1962
10	Lyle Moevao	3,410	2007 2008 2009

Single season
Rank	Player	Yards	Year
1	Sean Mannion	4,662	2013
2	Derek Anderson	4,058	2003
3	Derek Anderson	3,615	2004
4	Sean Mannion	3,328	2011
5	Derek Anderson	3,313	2002
6	Sean Canfield	3,271	2009
7	**Braden Atkinson**	3,169	2026
8	Sean Mannion	3,164	2014
9	Jonathan Smith	3,053	1999
10	Matt Moore	3,022	2006

Single game
Rank	Player	Yards	Years	Opponent
1	Sean Mannion	493	2013	Washington State
2	Derek Anderson	485	2003	USC
3	Sean Mannion	481	2013	California
4	Jonathan Smith	469	1998	Washington
5	Erik Wilhelm	461	1987	Akron
6	Sean Mannion	443	2013	Utah
7	Matt Moore	436	2005	Arizona
8	Sean Mannion	433	2012	Arizona
9	Braden Atkinson	427	2026	Colorado State
10	Sean Mannion	422	2013	Eastern Washington

=== Passing touchdowns ===
Career
Rank	Player	TDs	Years
1	Sean Mannion	83	2011 2012 2013 2014
2	Derek Anderson	79	2001 2002 2003 2004
3	Jonathan Smith	55	1998 1999 2000 2001
4	Erik Wilhelm	52	1985 1986 1987 1988
5	Jake Luton	42	2017 2018 2019
6	Sean Canfield	38	2006 2007 2008 2009
7	Chance Nolan	32	2020 2021 2022
8	Matt Moore	29	2005 2006
9	**Braden Atkinson**	25	2026
10	Steve Endicott	24	1969 1970 1971

Single season
Rank	Player	TDs	Year
1	Sean Mannion	37	2013
2	Derek Anderson	29	2004
3	Jake Luton	28	2019
4	Derek Anderson	25	2002
5	Derek Anderson	25	2003
5	**Braden Atkinson**	25	2026
7	Sean Canfield	21	2009
7	DJ Uiagalelei	21	2023
9	Jonathan Smith	20	2000
10	Lyle Moevao	19	2008
10	Chance Nolan	19	2021

Single game
Rank	Player	TDs	Years	Opponent
1	Sean Mannion	6	2013	Colorado
2	Erik Wilhelm	5	1987	Akron
2	Derek Anderson	5	2002	UNLV
2	Lyle Moevao	5	2008	Oregon
2	Sean Mannion	5	2013	Utah
2	Jake Luton	5	2019	UCLA
2	Jake Luton	5	2019	Washington State
2	DJ Uiagalelei	5	2023	California
2	**Braden Atkinson**	5	2026	Montana
2	**Braden Atkinson**	5	2026	Colorado State
2	**Braden Atkinson**	5	2026	San Diego State

== Rushing ==
=== Rushing yards ===
Career
Rank	Player	Yards	Years
1	Ken Simonton	5,044	1998 1999 2000 2001
2	Jacquizz Rodgers	3,877	2008 2009 2010
3	Yvenson Bernard	3,862	2004 2005 2006 2007
4	Steven Jackson	3,625	2001 2002 2003
5	Jermar Jefferson	2,923	2018 2019 2020
6	Storm Woods	2,674	2012 2013 2014 2015
7	Dave Schilling	2,552	1969 1970 1971
8	Pete Pifer	2,233	1964 1965 1966
9	Ryan Nall	2,216	2015 2016 2017
10	Anthony Hankerson	2,168	2024 2025

Single season
Rank	Player	Yards	Year
1	Steven Jackson	1,690	2002
2	Ken Simonton	1,559	2000
3	Steven Jackson	1,545	2003
4	Ken Simonton	1,486	1999
5	Jacquizz Rodgers	1,440	2009
6	Jermar Jefferson	1,380	2018
7	B. J. Baylor	1,337	2021
8	Yvenson Bernard	1,321	2005
9	Yvenson Bernard	1,307	2006
10	Bill Enyart	1,304	1968

Single game
Rank	Player	Yards	Years	Opponent
1	Bill Enyart	299	1968	Utah
2	Jermar Jefferson	254	2018	Arizona State
3	Steven Jackson	239	2002	California
4	Ken Simonton	234	2000	USC
5	Dave Mann	233	1951	Utah
6	Steven Jackson	230	2002	Stanford
7	Pete Pifer	228	1966	Arizona
8	Steven Jackson	227	2002	Fresno State
	Steven Jackson	227	2003	California
10	Jermar Jefferson	226	2020	Oregon

=== Rushing touchdowns ===
Career
Rank	Player	TDs	Years
1	Ken Simonton	59	1998 1999 2000 2001
2	Jacquizz Rodgers	46	2008 2009 2010
3	Steven Jackson	39	2001 2002 2003
4	Yvenson Bernard	38	2004 2005 2006 2007
5	Jermar Jefferson	27	2018 2019 2020
6	Bill Enyart	25	1966 1967 1968
	Storm Woods	25	2012 2013 2014 2015
8	Ryan Nall	24	2015 2016 2017
	Anthony Hankerson	24	2024 2025
10	Sam Baker	23	1950 1951 1952

Single season
Rank	Player	TDs	Year
1	Jacquizz Rodgers	21	2009
2	Ken Simonton	19	1999
	Ken Simonton	19	2000
	Steven Jackson	19	2003
5	Bill Enyart	17	1968
6	Steven Jackson	15	2002
	Anthony Hankerson	15	2024
8	Jacquizz Rodgers	14	2010
9	Ken Simonton	13	1998
	Yvenson Bernard	13	2005
	Yvenson Bernard	13	2007
	Storm Woods	13	2012
	Ryan Nall	13	2016
	B. J. Baylor	13	2021

Single game
Rank	Player	TDs	Years	Opponent
1	Pete Pifer	4	1966	Washington State
	Bill Enyart	4	1968	Kentucky
	Ken Simonton	4	1998	Oregon
	Ken Simonton	4	1999	Georgia Southern
	Steven Jackson	4	2003	New Mexico
	Jacquizz Rodgers	4	2009	Stanford
	Damien Martinez	4	2023	Stanford
	Anthony Hankerson	4	2025	Lafayette

== Receiving ==
=== Receptions ===
Career
Rank	Player	Rec	Years
1	Markus Wheaton	227	2009 2010 2011 2012
2	Brandin Cooks	226	2011 2012 2013
3	James Rodgers	222	2007 2008 2009 2010
4	Mike Hass	220	2002 2003 2004 2005
5	James Newson	213	2000 2001 2002 2003
6	Isaiah Hodgins	176	2017 2018 2019
7	Victor Bolden Jr.	170	2013 2014 2015 2016
8	Sammie Stroughter	164	2004 2005 2006 2007
9	Trent Walker	154	2023 2024 2025
10	Phil Ross	153	1985 1987 1988 1989

Single season
Rank	Player	Rec	Year
1	Brandin Cooks	128	2013
2	James Rodgers	91	2009
2	Markus Wheaton	91	2012
4	Mike Hass	90	2005
5	Mike Hass	86	2004
5	Isaiah Hodgins	86	2019
7	James Newson	81	2003
7	Trent Walker	81	2024
9	Dave Montagne	78	1986
9	Jacquizz Rodgers	78	2009
9	**Jesse Legree**	78	2026

Single game
Rank	Player	Rec	Years	Opponent
1	Mike Hass	14	2004	Arizona State
1	Brandin Cooks	14	2013	San Diego State
1	Isaiah Hodgins	14	2018	Nevada
4	Shane Morales	13	2008	Stanford
4	Jacquizz Rodgers	13	2009	Arizona
4	Brandin Cooks	13	2013	Eastern Washington
4	Brandin Cooks	13	2013	California
4	Trent Walker	13	2025	App State
9	Vern Burke	12	1962	Iowa State
9	Mike Hass	12	2004	Boise State
9	Sammie Stroughter	12	2008	Stanford
9	Markus Wheaton	12	2012	Nicholls State
9	Trent Walker	12	2024	Washington State
9	**Jesse Legree**	12	2026	Boise State (Note: This was the regularly scheduled game between the teams. They will play in the 2026 Pac-12 Championship Game.)

=== Receiving yards ===
Career
Rank	Player	Yards	Years
1	Mike Hass	3,924	2002 2003 2004 2005
2	James Newson	3,572	2000 2001 2002 2003
3	Brandin Cooks	3,272	2011 2012 2013
4	Markus Wheaton	2,994	2009 2010 2011 2012
5	Sammie Stroughter	2,623	2004 2005 2006 2007 2008
6	James Rodgers	2,578	2007 2008 2009 2010 2011
7	Isaiah Hodgins	2,322	2017 2018 2019
8	Reggie Bynum	2,231	1982 1983 1984 1985
9	Robb Thomas	2,043	1985 1986 1987 1988
10	Trevon Bradford	1,904	2016 2017 2018 2019 2020 2021

Single season
Rank	Player	Yards	Year
1	Brandin Cooks	1,730	2013
2	Mike Hass	1,532	2005
3	**Jesse Legree**	1,428	2026
4	Mike Hass	1,379	2004
5	James Newson	1,306	2003
6	Sammie Stroughter	1,293	2006
7	James Newson	1,284	2002
8	Markus Wheaton	1,244	2012
9	Isaiah Hodgins	1,171	2019
10	Brandin Cooks	1,151	2012

Single game
Rank	Player	Yards	Years	Opponent
1	Mike Hass	293	2004	Boise State
2	**Jesse Legree**	240	2026	Texas Tech
3	Brandin Cooks	232	2013	California
4	Robb Thomas	230	1987	Akron
5	Mike Hass	225	2003	Stanford
6	Sammie Stroughter	223	2006	Washington
7	Roddy Tompkins	210	1998	Washington
7	Brandin Cooks	210	2013	Utah
9	James Newson	208	2003	Boise State
9	Mike Hass	208	2003	USC

=== Receiving touchdowns ===
Career
Rank	Player	TDs	Years
1	Brandin Cooks	24	2011 2012 2013
2	James Newson	20	2000 2001 2002 2003
2	Mike Hass	20	2002 2003 2004 2005
2	Isaiah Hodgins	20	2017 2018 2019
5	Vern Burke	19	1962 1963
5	James Rodgers	19	2007 2008 2009 2010 2011
7	Robb Thomas	18	1985 1986 1987 1988
8	Markus Wheaton	16	2009 2010 2011 2012
9	Reggie Bynum	15	1982 1983 1984 1985
9	Joe Newton	15	2003 2004 2006
9	**Jesse Legree**	15	2026

Single season
Rank	Player	TDs	Year
1	Brandin Cooks	16	2013
2	**Jesse Legree**	15	2026
3	Isaiah Hodgins	13	2019
4	James Newson	12	2002
5	Markus Wheaton	11	2012
6	Vern Burke	10	1962
6	Robb Thomas	10	1987
8	Vern Burke	9	1963
8	James Rodgers	9	2009
10	Chad Johnson	8	2000
10	Shane Morales	8	2008
10	Jack Velling	8	2023

Single game
Rank	Player	TDs	Years	Opponent
1	Reggie Bynum	4	1985	Idaho
1	Robb Thomas	4	1987	Akron

== Total offense ==
Total offense is the sum of passing and rushing statistics. It does not include receiving or returns.

=== Total offense yards ===
Career
Rank	Player	Yards	Years
1	Sean Mannion	12,796	2011 2012 2013 2014
2	Derek Anderson	10,716	2001 2002 2003 2004
3	Jonathan Smith	9,209	1998 1999 2000 2001
4	Erik Wilhelm	9,062	1985 1986 1987 1988
5	Matt Moore	5,622	2005 2006
6	Sean Canfield	5,497	2006 2007 2008 2009
7	Ken Simonton	5,044	1998 1999 2000 2001
8	Jake Luton	5,023	2016 2017 2018 2019
9	Terry Baker	4,979	1960 1961 1962
10	Chance Nolan	4,661	2020 2021 2022

Single season
Rank	Player	Yards	Year
1	Sean Mannion	4,439	2013
2	Derek Anderson	3,993	2003
3	Derek Anderson	3,463	2004
4	**Braden Atkinson**	3,162	2026
5	Sean Mannion	3,138	2011
6	Sean Canfield	3,111	2009
7	Derek Anderson	3,082	2002
8	Matt Moore	3,011	2006
9	Chance Nolan	2,963	2021
10	Jonathan Smith	2,957	1999

Single game
Rank	Player	Yards	Years	Opponent
1	Sean Mannion	487	2013	Washington State
2	Sean Mannion	462	2013	California
3	Erik Wilhelm	480	1987	Akron
4	Matt Moore	462	2006	Arizona
5	Derek Anderson	460	2003	USC
6	Jonathan Smith	459	1998	Washington
7	**Braden Atkinson**	453	2026	Colorado State
8	Sean Mannion	431	2013	Utah
9	Sean Mannion	422	2013	Eastern Washington
10	Sean Mannion	420	2012	Arizona

=== Touchdowns responsible for ===
"Touchdowns responsible for" is the NCAA's official term for combined passing and rushing touchdowns.

Career
Rank	Player	TDs	Years
1	Derek Anderson	87	2001 2002 2003 2004
2	Sean Mannion	85	2011 2012 2013 2014
3	Jonathan Smith	59	1998 1999 2000 2001
4	Ken Simonton	59	1998 1999 2000 2001
5	Erik Wilhelm	55	1985 1986 1987 1988
6	Jacquizz Rodgers	48	2008 2009 2010
7	Jake Luton	43	2016 2017 2018 2019
8	Sean Canfield	41	2006 2007 2008 2009
9	Terry Baker	39	1960 1961 1962
9	Steven Jackson	39	2001 2002 2003

Single season
Rank	Player	TDs	Year
1	Sean Mannion	37	2013
2	Derek Anderson	31	2004
3	Derek Anderson	29	2003
3	Jake Luton	29	2019
5	Derek Anderson	27	2002
5	DJ Uiagalelei	27	2023
5	**Braden Atkinson**	27	2026
8	Terry Baker	24	1962
9	Matt Moore	23	2006
9	Sean Canfield	23	2009

Single game
Rank	Player	TDs	Years	Opponent
1	Terry Baker	6	1962	Iowa State
1	Derek Anderson	6	2002	UNLV
1	Sean Mannion	6	2013	Colorado
1	Jake Luton	6	2019	UCLA
1	**Braden Atkinson**	6	2026	Montana

== Defense ==
=== Interceptions ===
Career
Rank	Player	Ints	Years
1	Mitch Meeuwsen	20	2001 2002 2003 2004
2	Dan Espalin	15	1962 1963 1964
	Sabby Piscitelli	15	2003 2004 2005 2006
4	Charlie Olds	13	1964 1965 1966 1967 1968
	Armon Hatcher	13	1995 1996 1997 1998
	Jordan Poyer	13	2009 2010 2011 2012
7	Larry Rich	12	1967 1968 1969
	Jim Lilly	12	1970 1971 1972
	Lavance Northington	12	1984 1985 1987
10	Bill Sheffold	11	1949 1950 1951
	Teddy Johnson	11	1985 1986 1985 1988

Single season
Rank	Player	Ints	Year
1	Bill Sheffold	9	1949
	Dan Espalin	9	1962
	Teddy Johnson	9	1986
4	Bill Bartley	8	1972
5	Sam Wesley	7	1955
	Dave Graham	7	1970
	Jim Lilly	7	1970
	Steve Brown	7	1971
	Dennis Downey	7	1973
	Lavance Northington	7	1985
	Jordan Poyer	7	2012

Single game
Rank	Player	Ints	Years	Opponent
1	Steve Brown	4	1971	Stanford

=== Tackles ===
Career
Rank	Player	Tackles	Years
1	Steve Brown	415	1970 1971 1972
2	Reggie Tongue	362	1992 1993 1994 1995
3	Jeff Schneider	360	1984 1985 1986 1987
4	Richard Seigler	356	2000 2001 2002 2003
5	Kane Rogers	349	1992 1993 1994 1995
6	Trent Bray	337	2002 2003 2004 2005
7	Todd Sahlfeld	324	1988 1989 1990 1991
8	Rico Petrini	316	1991 1992 1993 1994
9	Omar Speights	304	2019 2020 2021 2022
10	Michael Hale	299	1991 1992 1993 1994

Single season
Rank	Player	Tackles	Year
1	Steve Brown	186	1972
2	Andre Harris	144	1987
	Todd Sahlfeld	144	1991
4	Osia Lewis	131	1985
5	Kane Rogers	128	1995
6	Jerome Boyd	125	1981
7	Andre Harris	124	1988
8	Avery Roberts	123	2021
9	Trent Bray	122	2004
10	Nick Barnett	121	2002

Single game
Rank	Player	Tackles	Years	Opponent
1	Steve Brown	22	1972	Stanford
	Andre Harris	22	1988	Colorado
3	Osia Lewis	21	1985	Washington
	Avery Roberts	21	2020	Utah
5	Andre Harris	20	1987	0Oregon
6	James Murphy	19	1982	Oregon
	Andre Harris	19	1987	USC
	Trent Bray	19	2004	Boise State
9	Buster Elahee	18	1996	California
	Derrick Doggett	18	2007	Oregon
	Lance Mitchell	18	2010	TCU
	Omar Speights	18	2019	Washington

=== Sacks ===
Career
Rank	Player	Sacks	Years
1	Bill Swancutt	37.0	2001 2002 2003 2004
2	Victor Butler	25.5	2005 2006 2007 2008
3	Scott Crichton	22.5	2011 2012 2013
4	Inoke Breckterfield	19.5	1995 1996 1997 1998
5	Slade Norris	19.0	2005 2006 2007 2008
6	Hamilcar Rashed Jr.	16.5	2017 2018 2019 2020
7	Kane Rogers	16.0	1992 1993 1994 1995
8	LaDairis Jackson	15.5	1999 2000
9	Dorian Smith	15.0	2006 2007
10	Esera Tuaolo	14.0	1987 1988 1989 1990
	Stephen Paea	14.0	2008 2009 2010

Single season
Rank	Player	Sacks	Year
1	Hamilcar Rashed Jr.	14.0	2019
2	Maurice Porter	12.0	1982
	Victor Butler	12.0	2008
4	LaDairis Jackson	11.5	2000
	Bill Swancutt	11.5	2002
	Bill Swancutt	11.5	2003
	Bill Swancutt	11.5	2004
8	Victor Butler	10.5	2007
9	Slade Norris	10.0	2008
10	Andrew Chatfield Jr.	9.5	2023

Single game
Rank	Player	Sacks	Years	Opponent
1	Maurice Porter	4.0	1982	Montana
	Phil Alfieri	4.0	1985	Idaho
	Rich Haggerty	4.0	1985	Idaho
	Victor Butler	4.0	2008	Pittsburgh

== Kicking ==
=== Field goals made ===
Career
Rank	Player	FGs	Years
1	Alexis Serna	80	2004 2005 2006 2007
2	Trevor Romaine	53	2011 2012 2013 2014
3	Justin Kahut	47	2007 2008 2009 2010
4	Kirk Yliniemi	37	2001 2002 2003
5	Troy Bussanich	36	1987 1988 1989
6	Everett Hayes	35	2019 2020 2021 2022 2024
7	Ryan Cesca	34	1999 2000 2001 2002
8	Kieron Walford	32	1976 1977 1978
	Garrett Owens	32	2014 2015 2016
10	José Cortéz	28	1997 1998

Single season
Rank	Player	FGs	Year
1	Alexis Serna	23	2005

Single game
Rank	Player	FGs	Years	Opponent
1	Alexis Serna	6	2005	Washington
2	Alexis Serna	5	2004	Washington
	Alexis Serna	5	2005	Oregon
	Alexis Serna	5	2007	Washington
	Garrett Owens	5	2014	Portland State

=== Field goal percentage ===
Career
Rank	Player	FG%	Years
1	Kirk Yliniemi	86.0%	2001 2002 2003
2	Atticus Sappington	85.7%	2022 2023
3	Alexis Serna	76.9%	2004 2005 2006 2007
4	Trevor Romaine	76.8%	2011 2012 2013 2014
5	Jim Nielsen	75.0%	1984 1985
6	Justin Kahut	73.4%	2007 2008 2009 2010
7	Garrett Owens	71.1%	2014 2015 2016
8	Troy Bussanich	66.7%	1987 1988 1989
9	Ryan Cesca	63.0%	1999 2000 2001 2002
10	Everett Hayes	62.5%	2019 2020 2021 2022 2024
