= Trace Armstrong =

American football player, union president, and sports agent (born 1965)

No. 93
- Position: Defensive end

Personal information
- Born: October 5, 1965 (age 61); Bethesda, Maryland, U.S.
- Listed height: 6 ft 4 in (1.93 m)
- Listed weight: 275 lb (125 kg)

Career information
- High school: John Carroll Catholic (Birmingham, Alabama)
- College: Florida
- NFL draft: 1989: 1st round, 12th overall pick

Career history
- Chicago Bears (1989–1994); Miami Dolphins (1995–2000); Oakland Raiders (2001–2003)

Awards and highlights
- Second-team All-Pro (2000); Pro Bowl (2000); NFL forced fumbles leader (2000); PFWA All-Rookie Team (1989); 100 greatest Bears of All-Time; First-team All-American (1988); First-team All-SEC (1988); University of Florida Athletic Hall of Fame

Career NFL statistics
- Games played: 211
- Games started: 129
- Total tackles: 619
- Sacks: 106
- Forced fumbles: 23
- Stats at Pro Football Reference

Raymond Lester "Trace" Armstrong III (born October 5, 1965) is an American former professional football player who was a defensive end in the National Football League (NFL) for fifteen seasons from the late 1980s to the early 2000s. He played college football for the Arizona State Sun Devils and Florida Gators, and was recognized as an All-American. A first-round (12th overall) pick in the 1989 NFL draft, he played for the Chicago Bears, Miami Dolphins and Oakland Raiders. He was formerly the president of the National Football League Players Association (NFLPA), and he currently works as a sports agent.

== Early life ==
Armstrong was born in Bethesda, Maryland, in 1965. He attended John Carroll Catholic High School in Birmingham, Alabama, where he played high school football and lettered three years as an outside linebacker and defensive end for the John Carroll Cavaliers. Armstrong was an all-state selection and was named one of The Birmingham News' top twelve players in Alabama as a high school senior.

== College career ==
Armstrong accepted an athletic scholarship to attend Arizona State University in Tempe, Arizona, where he began his college career as a defensive tackle for the Arizona State Sun Devils football team. He red-shirted in 1984, and as a freshman in 1985 he played in ten games with three starts, totaling thirty-two tackles (two for a loss).

As a sophomore in 1986, Armstrong was a back-up with two starts on the 10–1–1 Sun Devils that finished fourth in the AP poll and defeated the Michigan Wolverines in the Rose Bowl. He recovered a key fumble in the Sun Devils' defeat of the USC Trojans that sealed the Devils' Rose Bowl bid. He finished the 1986 season with twenty-six tackles (one for a loss—a quarterback sack), one forced fumble and one fumble recovery.

As a junior starter in 1987, Armstrong had a key role in the defeat of the Oregon State Beavers, when he sacked Erik Wilhelm in the end zone for a safety that began an 11–0 scoring run by the Sun Devils in sealing a 30–21 win. The 1987 Sun Devils finished No. 20 in the final AP poll after defeating Air Force in the 1987 Freedom Bowl. Armstrong ended the 1987 season with fifty-one tackles (ten for-a-loss including a team-leading seven sacks). He was an honorable mention All-American by both the AP and UPI.

Armstrong was denied a final year of eligibility by the NCAA due to an "academic mix-up," which he could only recoup if he transferred to another school. However, he was granted immediate eligibility after the NCAA waived its transfer rule in an unusual academic status case from high school which allowed the transfer.

As a result, Armstrong transferred to the University of Florida in Gainesville, Florida, and played his final college season for coach Galen Hall's Florida Gators football team in 1988. He was recognized as a first-team All-Southeastern Conference (SEC) selection and a first-team All-American at defensive tackle. He set a new Gators single-season record for most tackles for a loss with nineteen, including seven sacks. In all, Armstrong recorded fifty-nine tackles with forty-one of those solo. He finished his college career on the sidelines in the Gators' 14–10 win over the Illinois Fighting Illini in the All American Bowl on December 29, 1988. He underwent arthroscopic surgery to repair his left knee two weeks before the bowl game and could not play.

Armstrong ended his college career with 169 tackles, including thirty-two tackles for losses and fifteen quarterback sacks. He graduated from the University of Florida with a bachelor's degree in liberal arts in 1989, and returned to earn a master's degree in business administration in 2006. As part of a fan poll conducted by The Gainesville Sun in 2006, he was voted to the Florida Gators 100th Anniversary Team as a defensive lineman together with other Gators like Jack Youngblood, Wilber Marshall and Kevin Carter. Armstrong was also inducted into the University of Florida Athletic Hall of Fame as a "Gator Great" in 2000.

== Professional career ==
Pre-draft measurables
Height	Weight	Bench press
6 ft 3 1/2 in (1.92 m)	256 lb (116 kg)	20 reps

=== Chicago Bears ===
The Chicago Bears selected Armstrong in the first round (12th overall pick) of the 1989 NFL Draft. He played for the Bears for six seasons from 1989 to 1994. He signed with the Bears on August 18, 1989; his total package was a reported $2.2 million over four years.

After the Bears' 47–27 victory at Detroit on September 27, 1989, Armstrong perhaps made his first NFL mark. After reporting late to training camp because of a contract dispute, and then struggling through the first two games of the season, Armstrong finally found his niche at left defensive end against the Lions, making five solo tackles, defending a pass and getting his first pro sack by dumping Lions quarterback Bob Gagliano. Armstrong finished his rookie season with five sacks and was voted All-Rookie. His teammates voted him the winner of the Brian Piccolo Award for "courage, loyalty, teamwork, dedication, and sense of humor."

The following season, 1990, Armstrong notched ten sacks, the first of five seasons he reached double-digits. He was NFC Defensive Player of the Month in September 1990, in which he totaled twenty-five tackles, five sacks, two forced fumbles, one fumble recovery, and one pass defended.

In 1991, he recorded only 1.5 sacks, in part because although he was the starting left defensive end he moved to defensive tackle in the Bears "nickel defense," perhaps cutting down on his pass-rush opportunities. He was slated to play that spot again in 1992, however, the development of Alonzo Spellman allowed Armstrong to play end in all situations. As a result, his sack total was a 6.5.

On March 16, 1993, Armstrong re-signed a three-year $3 million deal with the Bears which was reported to make him one of the five highest-paid players on the team. In 1993, Armstrong notched 11.5 sacks and forced three fumbles. He was named NFC Defensive Player of the Week for three tackles, one forced fumble, two fumble recoveries, and two sacks in a Thanksgiving Day win over Detroit. He also had six tackles and two sacks at Philadelphia on October 10, 1993, and then career-best 2.5 sacks at Kansas City on November 21, 1993.

In 1994, his last in Chicago, he had 7.5 sacks. In the playoffs that season, against the Minnesota Vikings, January 1, 1995, Armstrong recorded both of the Bears' sacks in a 35–18 win over the Vikings for which he was awarded the NFC Defensive Player of the Week award.

=== Miami Dolphins ===
On April 4, 1995, the Dolphins traded a second and third-round draft pick for Armstrong. He was acquired to fill a role as a designated pass rusher, a player who comes into the game in likely passing downs in an effort to give the team's pass rush a boost. This is a role Armstrong filled the rest of his career; however, in five seasons, injuries to the starting ends forced Armstrong into a starting role. On October 12, 1995, Armstrong signed a five-year $8.9 million contract extension with the Dolphins.

In 1996, Armstrong started nine games and recorded twelve sacks. He remained the starter in 1997 and returned to the "designated rusher" role in 1998.

He was named as the NFL's Defensive Player of the Week for postseason games played January 8–9, 2000. In the Dolphins 20–17 win over the Seattle Seahawks on Sunday, January 9, 2000, Armstrong helped a defense which limited Seattle to 32 total yards in the second half. He registered five tackles, three sacks and one quarterback hurry on the day.

He led the AFC in quarterback sacks (16.5) in 2000 with the Miami Dolphins while recording 7 forced fumbles, also a career-high. He also made the Pro Bowl for the only time in his career. He did this despite not starting a single game, making him the first so-called designated pass rusher to go to the Pro Bowl since Fred Dean was voted to the 1983 post-season all-star game.

=== Oakland Raiders ===
Armstrong signed a free-agent contract with the Raiders in 2001. The Raiders offered him a six-year deal worth approximately $18.5 million. However, the first two years were to pay approximately $8 million, including a $5 million signing bonus. In his three years with the Raiders, Armstrong earned $9 million.

Armstrong sustained an Achilles tendon injury on September 30, 2001, causing him to miss the final thirteen games of the 2001 season. In 2002 and 2003, Armstrong was pressed into a starting role due to injuries of the so-called "run down defense" of the Raiders. He started eight games at right defensive end in 2002 after Tony Bryant was hurt, and he started seven games at left defensive end when Lorenzo Bromell was injured in 2003.

Armstrong suffered his own injuries in 2002 and 2003. In 2002 it was a groin injury that put him in the injured-reserve list and in 2003, he injured a shoulder in November which ended his 2003 season after ten games.

While in Oakland, he was the twentieth player in NFL history to record 100 career quarterback sacks, and finished his career with a total of 106.5. (When he retired, he was sixteenth in the all-time sack leader list.) Following the 2003 season, he was released from the Oakland Raiders after failing a physical due to several substantial injuries incurred while in Oakland and retired from the NFL afterwards. According to NFLPA records, in his fifteen NFL seasons Armstrong earned approximately $23 million in salary and bonuses.

== NFL Players Association ==
While playing in the NFL, Armstrong served as the president of the NFL Players Association (NFLPA) for eight years (1996–2003). In 2009, Armstrong stood for election to become the full-time executive director of the NFLPA, a position left vacant by the death of Gene Upshaw. Although he was considered a favorite for the job, he lost the election to Washington, D.C.–based attorney DeMaurice Smith.

== Life after the NFL ==
Armstrong formerly served as the agent for Penn State Nittany Lions coach James Franklin, former NFL head coach Marty Schottenheimer, former Michigan Wolverines head coach Brady Hoke, Dallas Cowboys head coach Mike McCarthy, former Tennessee head coach Butch Jones, former Kansas Jayhawks head coach Les Miles, former Texas Longhorns head coach Tom Herman, and Houston Cougars head coach Dana Holgorsen, among others. He is also the agent for several broadcasters such as Peter Gammons, Chris Mortensen, Dan Le Batard, and Stugotz (John Weiner). Armstrong currently lives in his former college hometown, Gainesville, Florida, with his wife Tami and three sons.

== See also ==
- 1988 College Football All-America Team
- Florida Gators football, 1980–89
- History of the Oakland Raiders
- List of Chicago Bears first-round draft picks
- List of Chicago Bears players
- List of Florida Gators football All-Americans
- List of Florida Gators in the NFL draft
- List of Miami Dolphins players
- List of University of Florida Athletic Hall of Fame members
