= Ryan Nall =

American football player (born 1995)

No. 35
- Position: Running back

Personal information
- Born: December 27, 1995 (age 30); Sandy, Oregon, U.S.
- Listed height: 6 ft 2 in (1.88 m)
- Listed weight: 239 lb (108 kg)

Career information
- High school: Central Catholic (Portland, Oregon)
- College: Oregon State (2014–2017)
- NFL draft: 2018: undrafted

Career history
- Chicago Bears (2018–2021); Dallas Cowboys (2022)*; Houston Roughnecks (2024)*
- * Offseason or practice squad member only

Career NFL statistics
- Rushing yards: 12
- Rushing average: 1.6
- Receptions: 8
- Receiving yards: 67
- Return yards: 35
- Total touchdowns: 1
- Tackles: 6
- Stats at Pro Football Reference

Ryan Nall (born December 27, 1995) is an American former professional football player who was a running back in the National Football League (NFL). He played college football for the Oregon State Beavers, and played in the NFL for the Chicago Bears.

== Early life ==
Nall was raised by his mother and father (Teri and Fred) with four siblings (two half-brothers, one brother, and one sister). He attended Central Catholic High School in Portland, Oregon, where he played high school football for the Rams.

As a senior, he rushed for 1,684 yards and 22 touchdowns, leading Central Catholic to their first state title in 60 years. He was named the Oregon Sports Awards Prep Football Player of the Year. Along with football, he also played basketball. On August 10, 2013, he committed to play football for the Oregon State Beavers, choosing it over Portland State and Wyoming.

== College career ==
Nall did not play as a true freshman in 2014 and chose to redshirt. As a redshirt freshman in 2015, Nall played in 11 games, rushing for 455 yards on 73 carries, scoring three touchdowns. He also caught seven passes for 109 yards.

In 2016, he appeared in 10 games, missing two due to injury. He finished the year with 951 rushing yards and 13 touchdowns on 147 carries along with 214 receiving yards on 22 receptions with two total touchdowns.

As a redshirt junior in 2017, he played in 11 games, rushing for 810 yards and eight touchdowns on 165 carries along with catching 27 passes for 240 yards and two touchdowns. After the season, he declared for the 2018 NFL draft.

Nall ranks eighth in Oregon State history with 2,216 rushing yards.

=== College statistics ===
Year	Team	Games		Rushing					Receiving				
Year	Team	GP	GS	Att	Yds	Avg	Lng	TD	Rec	Yds	Avg	Lng	TD
2014	Oregon State	0	0	Redshirt (redshirt)									
2015	Oregon State	11	2	73	455	6.2	66	3	7	109	15.6	37	0
2016	Oregon State	10	10	147	951	6.5	89	13	22	214	9.7	41	2
2017	Oregon State	11	9	165	810	4.9	75	8	27	240	8.9	44	2
Career		32	21	385	2,216	5.8	89	24	56	563	10.1	44	4

== Professional career ==
Pre-draft measurables
Height	Weight	Arm length	Hand span	40-yard dash	10-yard split	20-yard split	20-yard shuttle	Three-cone drill	Vertical jump	Broad jump	Bench press
6 ft 2 1/8 in (1.88 m)	232 lb (105 kg)	31 1/2 in (0.80 m)	10 in (0.25 m)	4.58 s	1.61 s	2.67 s	4.16 s	6.95 s	33 in (0.84 m)	10 ft 2 in (3.10 m)	15 reps
All values from NFL Combine

=== Chicago Bears ===
Nall signed with the Chicago Bears as an undrafted free agent on May 10, 2018. He was waived on September 1, and was re-signed to the practice squad the following day. Nall signed a reserve/future contract with the Bears on January 8, 2019.

On August 31, 2019, Nall was cut and re-signed to the team's practice squad the next day. He was promoted to the active roster on November 9. Nall recorded his first career carry in the team's season finale against the Minnesota Vikings, posting a seven-yard gain.

Nall scored his first professional touchdown on a six-yard reception in Week 9 of the 2020 season against the Tennessee Titans, a game that ended in a 24–17 loss. He signed a contract extension with the team on March 3, 2021. Nall was waived on August 31, and re-signed to the practice squad the next day. He was promoted to the active roster on October 10.

=== Dallas Cowboys ===
On April 8, 2022, Nall signed with the Dallas Cowboys. He was sidelined for most of training camp with a shoulder injury. Nall was waived/injured on August 15, and placed on injured reserve. Nall was released by Dallas on August 16.

=== Houston Roughnecks ===
On January 19, 2024, Nall signed with the Houston Roughnecks of the United Football League (UFL). He was released by the Roughnecks on March 10.

Nall announced his retirement on June 3, 2024.
