= 2016 Oregon State Beavers football team =

American college football season

2016 Oregon State Beavers football
- Conference: Pac-12 Conference
- North Division
- Record: 4–8 (3–6 Pac-12)
- Head coach: Gary Andersen (2nd season)
- Co-offensive coordinators: Kevin McGiven (1st season); T. J. Woods (1st season)
- Offensive scheme: Spread
- Defensive coordinator: Kevin Clune (1st season)
- Base defense: 3–4
- Home stadium: Reser Stadium

2016 Pac-12 Conference football standings
	Conf.			Overall
Team	W		L	W		L
North Division
No. 4 Washington xy$^	8	–	1	12	–	2
Washington State	7	–	2	8	–	5
No. 12 Stanford	6	–	3	10	–	3
California	3	–	6	5	–	7
Oregon State	3	–	6	4	–	8
Oregon	2	–	7	4	–	8
South Division
No. 17 Colorado xy	8	–	1	10	–	4
No. 3 USC	7	–	2	10	–	3
No. 23 Utah	5	–	4	9	–	4
Arizona State	2	–	7	5	–	7
UCLA	2	–	7	4	–	8
Arizona	1	–	8	3	–	9
Championship: Washington 41, Colorado 10
^ – College Football Playoff participant; $ – Conference champion; x – Division champion/co-champions; y – Championship game participant; Rankings from AP Poll

The 2016 Oregon State Beavers football team represented Oregon State University during the 2016 NCAA Division I FBS football season. The team was led by second-year head coach Gary Andersen and their home games were played on campus at Reser Stadium in Corvallis. Oregon State was a member of the North Division of the Pac-12 Conference. They finished the season 4–8, 3–6 in Pac-12 play to finish in a tie for fourth place in the North Division.

== Schedule ==
Date	Time	Opponent	Site	TV	Result	Attendance
September 1	6:00 pm	at Minnesota*	TCF Bank Stadium; Minneapolis, MN	BTN	L 23–30	44,582
September 17	2:00 pm	Idaho State*	Reser Stadium; Corvallis, OR	P12N	W 37–7	38,052
September 24	12:30 pm	Boise State*	Reser Stadium; Corvallis, OR	FS1	L 24–38	42,846
October 1	11:30 am	at Colorado	Folsom Field; Boulder, CO	P12N	L 6–47	46,839
October 8	6:00 pm	California	Reser Stadium; Corvallis, OR	P12N	W 47–44 ^{OT}	34,066
October 15	1:00 pm	No. 21 Utah	Reser Stadium; Corvallis, OR	P12N	L 14–19	32,093
October 22	3:30 pm	at No. 5 Washington	Alaska Airlines Field at Husky Stadium; Seattle, WA	P12N	L 17–41	65,796
October 29	7:45 pm	Washington State^{†}	Reser Stadium; Corvallis, OR	ESPN2	L 31–35	37,081
November 5	12:30 pm	at Stanford	Stanford Stadium; Stanford, CA	FS1	L 15–26	38,813
November 12	6:00 pm	at UCLA	Rose Bowl; Pasadena, CA	P12N	L 24–38	64,813
November 19	7:30 pm	Arizona	Reser Stadium; Corvallis, OR	P12N	W 42–17	35,059
November 26	1:00 pm	Oregon	Reser Stadium; Corvallis, OR (120th Civil War)	P12N	W 34–24	44,160
*Non-conference game; ^{†}Homecoming; Rankings from AP Poll released prior to the game; All times are in Pacific time

== Roster ==
2016 Oregon State Beavers football team roster
Players
Coaches
Offense

Pos.	#	Name	Class
QB	3	Marcus McMaryion	So
QB	10	Darell Garretson	Jr
QB	12	Conor Blount	Fr
QB	15	Mason Moran	Fr
RB	20	Tim Cook	Sr
RB	21	Artavis Pierce	Fr
RB	23	Marcus Greaves	Jr
RB	25	Jaylynn Bailey	Jr
RB	26	Kieran Yancy	So
RB	27	Kyle White	Jr
RB	30	Hunter Mattson	Fr
RB	34	Ryan Nall	So
WR	2	Hunter Jarmon	Jr
WR	6	Victor Bolden Jr.	Jr
WR	7	Xavier Hawkins	Jr
WR	13	Jordan Villamin	Jr
WR	16	Paul Lucas	So
WR	18	Timmy Hernandez	So
WR	19	Trevon Bradford	Fr
WR	22	Seth Collins	So
WR	80	Connor Laverty	Fr
WR	85	Koby Tripp	Fr
WR	86	Andre Bodden	Fr
WR	89	Tyler DeLashmutt	Fr
TE	42	Ricky Ortiz	Sr
TE	81	Noah Togiai	So
TE	82	Tuly Wily-Matagi	Fr
TE	83	Quinn Smith	So
TE	87	Michael Wilkins	So
TE	88	Kenny Turnier	Fr
OL	51	Kammy Delp	So
OL	60	Will Hopkins	Jr
OL	62	Gavin Andrews	Sr
OL	63	Gus Lavaka	Fr
OL	64	Fred Lauina	Jr
OL	66	Gunnar Braden	Fr
OL	67	Trent Moore	So
OL	68	Sosaia Tauaho	Sr
OL	69	Nous Keobounnam	Fr
OL	71	Robert Olson	So
OL	72	Miki Fifita	Fr
OL	73	Blake Brandel	Fr
OL	74	Dustin Stanton	Sr
OL	75	Brayden Kearsley	Jr
OL	76	Yanni Demogerontas	So
OL	77	Sean Harlow	Sr
OL	78	Sam Curtius	Jr
OL	79	Bobby Keenan	Sr

Defense

Pos.	#	Name	Class
CB	4	Dwayne Williams	So
CB	8	Rahmel Dockery	Sr
CB	12	Kendall Hill	Jr
CB	14	Treston Decoud	Sr
CB	15	Jordan Pace	Fr
CB	17	Julian Brentley	So
CB	22	Xavier Crawford	Fr
CB	23	Chris Henry	Fr
CB	24	Jay Irvine	Fr
CB	26	Jaydon Grant	Fr
CB	28	Shawn Wilson	Fr
CB	29	Christian Wallace	Fr
CB	38	Charles Okonkwo	Jr
S	3	Brandon Arnold	Jr
S	9	Devin Chappell	Sr
S	10	Omar Hicks-Onu	Fr
S	13	Landry Payne	Jr
S	29	Jordan Gregory	Fr
S	30	Drew Kell	So
S	33	Jalen Moore	Fr
S	40	Jonas Dahl	So
LB	46	Nick Janakes	Fr
ILB	5	Kyle Haley	Sr
ILB	35	Caleb Saulo	Sr
ILB	44	Ricky Liuchan	Fr
ILB	50	Wesley Payne	Jr
ILB	51	Luke Leonnig	Fr
ILB	55	Manase Hungalu	Jr
ILB	58	Hamilton Hunt	Fr
OLB	32	Jonathan Willis	So
OLB	37	Keegan Firth	Fr
OLB	37	Kee Whetzel	Fr
OLB	41	Shemar Smith	Fr
OLB	42	Doug Taumoelau	Fr
OLB	43	Adam Soesman	So
OLB	45	Kiahvé Dennis-Lee	Fr
OLB	47	Bright Ugwoegbu	So
OLB	49	Andrzej Hughes-Murray	Fr
OLB	53	Isaac Garcia	Fr
OLB	54	Shemiah Unutoa-Whitson	Fr
OLB	59	Hamilcar Rashed Jr.	Fr
OLB	93	Titus Failauga	Jr
OLB	94	Joah Robinett	Fr
DE	48	Reed Woodward	Fr
DE	52	Sumner Houston	So
DE	56	Thor Katoa	Fr
DE	90	Phillip Napoleon	Jr
DE	95	Baker Pritchard	Jr
DE	96	Lamone Williams	So
DT	57	Chris Mengis	Fr
DT	91	Noke Tago	Sr
DT	92	Paisa Savea	Jr
DT	97	Kalani Vakameilalo	So
DT	98	Andrew Iademarco	Fr
DT	99	Elu Aydon	Fr

Special teams

Pos.	#	Name	Class
K	21	Garrett Owens	Jr
K	27	Ian Crist	Sr
K	28	Zach Standish	Fr
K	39	Daniel Rodriguez	Fr
K	46	Jordan Choukair	Fr
K	87	Adley Rutschman	Fr
P	31	Nick Porebski	Jr
LS	36	Ryan Navarro	Sr
LS	57	Connor Kelsey	So

Head coach

- Gary Andersen

Coordinators/assistant coaches

- Kevin McGiven (OC)
- Dave Baldwin (TE)
- Brent Brennan (WR)
- Cory Hall (CB)

Legend

- (C) Team captain
- (S) Suspended
- (I) Ineligible
- Injured
- Redshirt

Roster

== Game summaries ==
=== At Minnesota ===
	1	2	3	4	Total
Beavers	7	7	9	0	23
Golden Gophers	0	17	0	13	30

=== Idaho State ===
	1	2	3	4	Total
Bengals	0	0	7	0	7
Beavers	13	10	14	0	37

=== Boise State ===
	1	2	3	4	Total
Broncos	14	17	0	7	38
Beavers	7	0	10	7	24

=== At Colorado ===
	1	2	3	4	Total
Beavers	3	3	0	0	6
Buffaloes	13	24	3	7	47

=== California ===
	1	2	3	4	OT	Total
Golden Bears	0	10	7	24	3	44
Beavers	10	7	17	7	6	47

=== Utah ===
	1	2	3	4	Total
#21 Utes	9	3	0	7	19
Beavers	0	0	7	7	14

=== At Washington ===
	1	2	3	4	Total
Beavers	0	0	10	7	17
#5 Huskies	21	10	10	0	41

=== Washington State ===
	1	2	3	4	Total
Cougars	0	6	22	7	35
Beavers	14	10	0	7	31

=== At Stanford ===
	1	2	3	4	Total
Beavers	0	7	0	8	15
Cardinal	10	3	10	3	26

=== At UCLA ===
	1	2	3	4	Total
Beavers	7	7	10	0	24
Bruins	21	3	7	7	38

=== Arizona ===
	1	2	3	4	Total
Wildcats	0	10	0	7	17
Beavers	14	7	14	7	42

=== Oregon ===
Oregon Ducks (4–7) at Oregon State Beavers (3–8)

Quarter	1	2	3	4	Total
Oregon	7	7	10	0	24
Oregon St	7	7	7	13	34

at Reser Stadium, Corvallis, Oregon

- Date: November 26, 2016
- Game time: 1:00 p.m. PST
- Game weather: Cloudy, 50 °F (10 °C)
- Game attendance: 44,160
- Referee: Land Clark
- TV: Pac-12 Network
- Box Score

Game information

First quarter

- OSU – Ryan Nall 12-yard run (Garrett Owens kick), 9:19. Oregon St 7–0. Drive: 9 plays, 61 yards, 4:17.
- ORE – Tony Brooks-James 3-yard run (Aidan Schneider kick), 5:51. Tie 7–7. Drive: 10 plays, 75 yards, 3:28.

Second quarter

- ORE – Darren Carrington 33-yard pass from Jalen Brown (Aidan Schneider kick), 12:24. Oregon 14–7. Drive: 5 plays, 83 yards, 1:37.
- OSU – Ricky Ortiz 6-yard pass from Marcus McMaryion (Garrett Owens kick), 5:51. Tie 14–14. Drive: 10 plays, 75 yards, 6:33.

Third quarter

- ORE – Charles Nelson 23-yard pass from Justin Herbert (Aidan Schneider kick), 11:43. Oregon 21–14. Drive: 4 plays, 60 yards, 1:03.
- ORE – Aidan Schneider 46-yard field goal, 7:44. Oregon 24–14. Drive: 11 plays, 50 yards, 2:24.
- OSU – Ryan Nall 14-yard run (Garrett Owens kick), 3:46. Oregon 24–21. Drive: 7 plays, 75 yards, 3:58.

Fourth quarter

- OSU – Ryan Nall 6-yard run (Garrett Owens kick), 9:40. Oregon St 28–24. Drive; 11 plays, 80 yards, 6:32.
- OSU – Ryan Nall 2-yard run (kick failed), 1:56. Oregon St 34–24. Drive: 9 plays, 68 yards, 5:17.

Top passers

- ORE – Justin Herbert – 16/28, 180 yards, TD
- OSU – Marcus McMaryion – 13/20, 101 yards, TD

Top rushers

- ORE – Royce Freeman – 19 rushes, 106 yards
- OSU – Ryan Nall – 31 rushes, 155 yards, 4 TD

Top receivers

- ORE – Darren Carrington – 3 receptions, 76 yards, TD
- OSU – Ryan Nall - 2 receptions, 34 yards
