= Trent Bray =

Trent Bray may refer to:

- Trent Bray (swimmer) (born 1973), New Zealand swimmer
- Trent Bray (American football) (born 1982), American football coach
