= 1987 Arizona Wildcats football team =

American college football season

1987 Arizona Wildcats football
- Conference: Pacific-10 Conference
- Record: 4–4–3 (2–3–3 Pac-10)
- Head coach: Dick Tomey (1st season)
- Offensive coordinator: Ben Griffith (1st season)
- Defensive coordinator: Larry Mac Duff (1st season)
- Home stadium: Arizona Stadium

1987 Pacific-10 Conference football standings
	Conf.					Overall
Team	W		L		T	W		L		T
No. 9 UCLA +	7	–	1	–	0	10	–	2	–	0
No. 18 USC +	7	–	1	–	0	8	–	4	–	0
Washington	4	–	3	–	1	7	–	4	–	1
No. 20 Arizona State	3	–	3	–	1	7	–	4	–	1
Oregon	4	–	4	–	0	6	–	5	–	0
Stanford	4	–	4	–	0	5	–	6	–	0
Arizona	2	–	3	–	3	4	–	4	–	3
California	2	–	3	–	2	3	–	6	–	2
Washington State	1	–	5	–	1	3	–	7	–	1
Oregon State	0	–	7	–	0	2	–	9	–	0
+ – Conference co-champions; Rankings from AP Poll

The 1987 Arizona Wildcats football team represented the University of Arizona during the 1987 NCAA Division I-A football season. They were coached by Dick Tomey in his first season with the school. Tomey was hired from Hawaii to replace Larry Smith, who accepted the head coaching position at USC, who like Arizona, was in the Pac-10 Conference. Tomey and Smith would face other later in the season (see below).

The departure of Smith heavily affected the Wildcats in the season, leading to a rebuild of the team led by Tomey, and ultimately finishing the season with a record of 4–4–3 (2–3–3 in Pac-10), including a tie with rival Arizona State in the season finale.

== Before the season ==
Arizona ended 1986 with a 9–3 record and won the Aloha Bowl, which was their first postseason win. When the season concluded, Smith was hired by conference opponent USC to take over the team, reportedly due to the Trojans’ longer-lasting football tradition as well as Smith’s success with Arizona. Arizona would hire Tomey, who was coaching at Hawaii, and accepted the coaching position (Tomey had attended the Aloha Bowl and was impressed by Arizona's performance that he contacted the school and was ultimately hired). Due to Smith leaving for USC, the Wildcats struggled to get in-state recruits under a new coach, which changed the direction of the football program. As a result, Arizona entered the 1987 season unranked in the polls.

== Schedule ==
Date	Time	Opponent	Site	TV	Result	Attendance	Source
September 12	7:00 p.m.	Iowa*	Arizona Stadium; Tucson, AZ	KMSB	L 14–15	57,284	
September 19	7:00 p.m.	New Mexico*	Arizona Stadium; Tucson, AZ (rivalry/Kit Carson Rifle)	KMSB	W 20–9	46,094	
September 26	12:30 p.m.	at No. 13 UCLA	Rose Bowl; Pasadena, CA	Prime	L 24–34	55,823	
October 3	7:00 p.m.	Bowling Green*	Arizona Stadium; Tucson, AZ	KMSB	W 45–7	43,498	
October 10	1:00 p.m.	at California	Memorial Stadium; Berkeley, CA	Prime	T 23–23	35,000	
October 17	7:00 p.m.	Oregon State	Arizona Stadium; Tucson, AZ	KMSB	W 31–17	48,494	
October 24	7:30 p.m.	at Washington State	Martin Stadium; Pullman, WA	Prime	L 28–45	22,269	
October 31	4:30 p.m.	at Stanford	Stanford Stadium; Stanford, CA	TBS	W 23–13	34,000	
November 7	6:30 p.m.	Washington^{†}	Arizona Stadium; Tucson, AZ	Prime	T 21–21	50,021	
November 14	2:30 p.m.	at USC	Los Angeles Memorial Coliseum; Los Angeles, CA	ESPN	L 10–12	51,428	
November 28	1:00 p.m.	at Arizona State	Sun Devil Stadium; Tempe, AZ (rivalry)	ABC	T 24–24	70,839	
*Non-conference game; ^{†}Homecoming; Rankings from AP Poll released prior to the game; All times are in Mountain time

== Game summaries ==
=== Iowa ===
In Tomey's Arizona debut, the Wildcats hosted Iowa. Arizona's offense struggled at times, but the defense kept them in the game. They would fall a point short to the Hawkeyes.

=== New Mexico ===
In their second game of the season, Arizona hosted New Mexico, and the Wildcats defeated the Lobos to give Tomey his first win as Arizona coach and the rivalry's trophy, the Kit Carson Rifle, remained in Tucson (the rifle would be retired after the 1997 season).

=== UCLA ===
In Arizona's Pac-10 opener, they visited UCLA, who was ranked 13th. In what was Tomey's first big test, the Wildcats hung with the Bruins before UCLA pulled away late to win. Arizona led at the half, but UCLA gained momentum in the second half that led to the Wildcats’ defeat.

=== California ===
In Berkeley, the visiting Wildcats took on California. Both Arizona and the Golden Bears tied each other in the end, giving Tomey his first tie as Arizona coach.

=== Washington ===
On homecoming day, Arizona faced Washington and was still looking for their first win over the Huskies. Both teams would play even, and the game ultimately ended in a draw.

=== USC ===
On the road at USC, Tomey faced his predecessor Larry Smith, and came up short to the Trojans. It was the first time in Wildcats history that a head coach faced an opponent coached by his predecessor in his first season. USC would ultimately go on to clinch a spot in the Rose Bowl near the end of the season.

=== Arizona State ===
In Tempe for the rivalry game, Arizona and Arizona State battled back and forth all game long. In the final minute of the fourth quarter, ASU led 24-21 and appeared on its way to ending the Wildcats’ five-game winning streak in the rivalry when they fumbled on a punt attempt and Arizona recovered the ball in the red zone. The Wildcats would convert on a field goal as time expired to settle for a tie. It would be the rivalry's first and only tie in history (the 1979 meeting nearly ended in a tie, but was thwarted by an ASU penalty on the final play and led to a winning Arizona field goal).

== Awards and honors ==
- Chuck Cecil, S, Pac-10 defensive player of the year, Consensus All-American, First-team all-Pac-10
- Dana Wells, DL, Pac-10 Morris Trophy winner (defense)

== Season notes ==
- Without the guidance of Smith, Arizona's win percentage dropped in Tomey's first year, though the program was in a rebuilding process. Tomey would bring back a winning resurgence that Smith built beginning in 1988.
- The Wildcats played Iowa this season and had a new coach. They had also played Iowa in Smith's first year in 1980. Unlike Smith, who defeated the Hawkeyes, Tomey lost to them.
- Tomey got his first Pac-10 win against Oregon State and his first road win against Stanford.
- Arizona finished the season with three ties, which was the first season in which Arizona had more than one tie in its record. They were one of only two Pac-10 teams that had at least two ties in the season, with California being the other.
- When Arizona played USC, the game was referred to the “Smith Bowl” due to Smith being the coach at both schools and was previously Arizona coach before taking the USC job in this season. After this season, Tomey and Smith would face each other five more times, with USC winning three of them before Smith was fired in 1992.
- Despite tying Arizona State, the Wildcats were still dominant over the Sun Devils at the time and would finish the rest of the 1980s without losing to them.
- As the game against Arizona State ended in a tie, it will forever be the only tie in the rivalry as the NCAA would eliminate ties in 1996.
- If not for the ties and close losses, Arizona would have made a bowl appearance this season.
- The Wildcats only played five home games this season, which was the fewest in the Tomey era.
- For the second consecutive year, an Arizona player won the Pac-10 defensive player of the year award, as Chuck Cecil became the award's recipient this season. Cecil is known to many Wildcats fans for returning an interception for a touchdown against Arizona State in 1986 and picking off four passes against Stanford this year.

== After the season ==
Despite finishing the 1987 season with a mediocre record, the Wildcats had a bright future under Tomey. Arizona captured winning seasons for the rest of the 1980s and dominated the early part of the 1990s with a menacing defense. Tomey would coach the Wildcats to two memorable seasons in the decade (1993 and 1998) and resigned as coach in 2000, and is the winningest coach in Wildcat football history.

== Roster ==
1987 Arizona Wildcats football team roster
Players
Coaches
Offense

Pos.	#	Name	Class
C	52	Joe Tofflemire	Jr

Defense

Pos.	#	Name	Class
S	6	Chuck Cecil	Sr
DT	98	John Fina	Fr
DT	97	George Hinkle	Sr

Special teams

Pos.	#	Name	Class

Head coach

- Dick Tomey

Coordinators/assistant coaches

Legend

- (C) Team captain
- (S) Suspended
- (I) Ineligible
- Injured
- Redshirt
