= 1987 California Golden Bears football team =

American college football season

1987 California Golden Bears football
- Conference: Pacific-10 Conference
- Record: 3–6–2 (2–3–2 Pac-10)
- Head coach: Bruce Snyder (1st season)
- Defensive coordinator: Kent Baer (1st season)
- Home stadium: California Memorial Stadium

1987 Pacific-10 Conference football standings
	Conf.					Overall
Team	W		L		T	W		L		T
No. 9 UCLA +	7	–	1	–	0	10	–	2	–	0
No. 18 USC +	7	–	1	–	0	8	–	4	–	0
Washington	4	–	3	–	1	7	–	4	–	1
No. 20 Arizona State	3	–	3	–	1	7	–	4	–	1
Oregon	4	–	4	–	0	6	–	5	–	0
Stanford	4	–	4	–	0	5	–	6	–	0
Arizona	2	–	3	–	3	4	–	4	–	3
California	2	–	3	–	2	3	–	6	–	2
Washington State	1	–	5	–	1	3	–	7	–	1
Oregon State	0	–	7	–	0	2	–	9	–	0
+ – Conference co-champions; Rankings from AP Poll

The 1987 California Golden Bears football team was an American football team that represented the University of California, Berkeley in the Pacific-10 Conference (Pac-10) during the 1987 NCAA Division I-A football season. In their first year under head coach Bruce Snyder, the Golden Bears compiled a 3–6–2 record (2–3–2 against Pac-10 opponents), finished in eighth place in the Pac-10, and were outscored by their opponents by a combined total of 267 to 239.

The team's statistical leaders included Troy Taylor with 2,081 passing yards, Chris Richards with 668 rushing yards, and Brian Bedford with 515 receiving yards.

== Schedule ==
Date	Opponent	Site	Result	Attendance	Source
September 5	Pacific (CA)*	California Memorial Stadium; Berkeley, CA	W 42–0	37,000	
September 12	San Jose State*	California Memorial Stadium; Berkeley, CA	L 25–27	44,000	
September 19	at Minnesota*	Hubert H. Humphrey Metrodome; Minneapolis, MN	L 23–32	47,322	
September 26	USC	California Memorial Stadium; Berkeley, CA	L 14–31	62,000	
October 3	at No. 10 Tennessee*	Neyland Stadium; Knoxville, TN	L 12–38	91,688	
October 10	Arizona	California Memorial Stadium; Berkeley, CA	T 23–23	35,000	
October 24	at No. 8 UCLA	Rose Bowl; Pasadena, CA (rivalry)	L 18–42	51,107	
October 31	at Oregon	Autzen Stadium; Eugene, OR	W 20–6	37,255	
November 14	Arizona State	California Memorial Stadium; Berkeley, CA	W 38–20	38,000	
November 21	at Stanford	Stanford Stadium; Stanford, CA (Big Game)	L 7–31	85,000	
November 28	vs. Washington State	National Olympic Stadium; Tokyo, Japan (Coca-Cola Classic)	T 17–17	54,000	
*Non-conference game; Rankings from AP Poll released prior to the game

== Roster ==
1987 California Golden Bears football team roster
Players
Coaches
Offense

Pos.	#	Name	Class
WR	2	Mike Ford	So
WR	12	Brian Bedford	Sr

Defense

Pos.	#	Name	Class
LB	49	Ken Harvey	Sr
LB	30	Steve Hendrickson	Jr

Special teams

Pos.	#	Name	Class

Head coach

- Bruce Snyder

Coordinators/assistant coaches

Legend

- (C) Team captain
- (S) Suspended
- (I) Ineligible
- Injured
- Redshirt
