= Forest Grove High School =

Public school in Oregon, United States

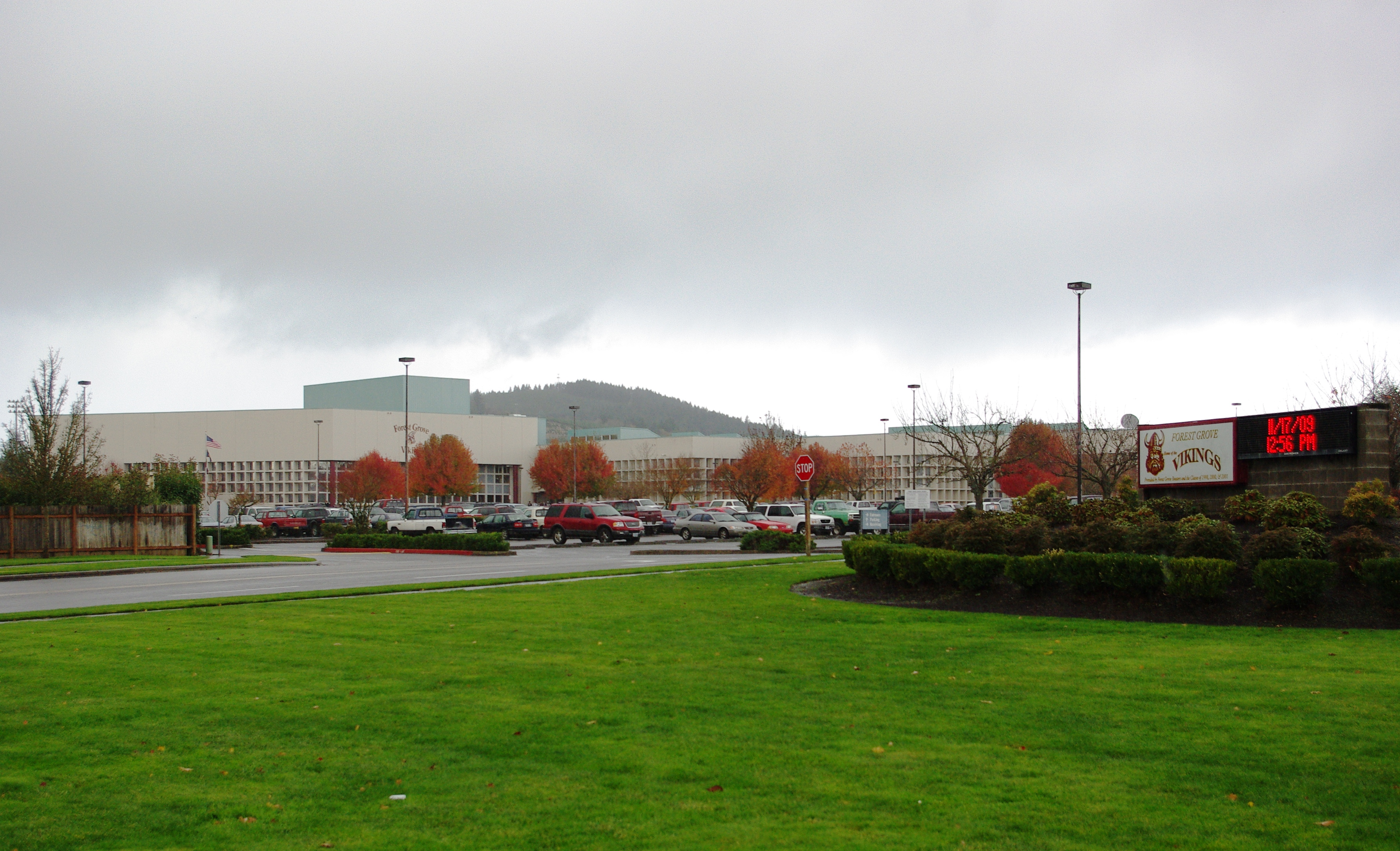

Location
- 1401 Nichols Lane; Forest Grove, Oregon 97116; United States; 45°32′04″N 123°07′12″W

Information
- Type: Public
- Opened: 1907
- School district: Forest Grove School District
- Principal: Karen O’Neil
- Teaching staff: 94.68 (on an FTE basis)
- Grades: 9–12
- Enrollment: 1,898 (2023–24)
- Student to teacher ratio: 20.05
- Colors: Maroon and gold
- Athletics conference: OSAA Pacific Conference 6A-3
- Mascot: Viking
- Feeder schools: Neil Armstrong Middle School
- Website: fghs.fgsdk12.org

Forest Grove High School (FGHS) is a public high school in Forest Grove, Oregon. Founded in 1907, it is the only high school in the Forest Grove School District.

== Academics ==
The school has been awarded the Bronze Medal in the U.S. News & World Report rankings of America's Best High Schools. The school once had the highest dropout rate in Washington County and test scores below the state average in the early 2000s. Forest Grove High hired a new principal, John O'Neil, to address these issues in 2002. He introduced mandatory reading and math workshops for students below the state average to raise their performance. This, and other changes, helped to reduce the dropout rate and improve test scores. For these improvements, in 2006 the school was presented the Closing the Achievement Gap award from the State of Oregon. The following year, the 2,000-student school became the first high school to win the award two years in a row. During this time, graduation rates improved from around 66% to 85%.

In 2008, 73% of the school's seniors received a high school diploma. Of 444 students, 325 graduated, 51 dropped out, 19 received a modified diploma, and 49 were still in high school the following year.

In 2009, The Oregonian described the school as an "overachiever" at teaching reading and math, due to its achievement scores.

== Athletics ==
- State championship in women's softball: 2007
- State championship in women's wrestling: 2022

== Notable programs ==
In 1976, the school started the Viking House Program, in which students build a single-family home each year in the community. They begin building in early September and finish construction with an open house in late May. The house is then put up for sale at market price, with the proceeds used for furthering the program with purchases of new tools and the materials for the next house. This program is one of few focused on house construction in Portland-area schools, in addition to those at Canby High School and Benson Polytechnic High School. The program adopted "learn by doing" as their motto. Through 2011, the program had built 35 homes.

The school also operates a firefighting cadet program that began in 2001. The program allows juniors and seniors to learn firefighting techniques that are usually taught at the community college level to prepare students for careers in firefighting. Forest Grove’s fire department and the school partner in the program with the fire department providing instructors.

In 2015, the school began publishing an online newspaper, The Advocate, written and edited by students. Published monthly during the school year, it emulates a full-fledged city newspaper, with national and world news sections.

== Notable alumni ==
- Bobby Chouinard, baseball pitcher
- Robert Garrigus, golfer
- Mitch Meeuwsen, football player
- Zac Rosscup, baseball pitcher
