= 2004 All-Pacific-10 Conference football team =

The 2004 All-Pacific-10 Conference football team consists of American football players chosen for All-Pacific-10 Conference teams for the 2004 Pacific-10 Conference football season.

== Offensive selections ==
=== Quarterbacks ===
- Aaron Rodgers, California (Coaches-1)
- Matt Leinart, USC (Coaches-1)
- Andrew Walter, Arizona St. (Coaches-2)
- Derek Anderson, Oregon St. (Coaches-2)

=== Running backs ===
- J. J. Arrington, California (Coaches-1)
- Reggie Bush, USC (Coaches-1)
- LenDale White, USC (Coaches-2)
- Maurice Jones-Drew, UCLA (Coaches-2)

=== Wide receivers ===
- Mike Hass, Oregon St. (Coaches-1)
- Geoff McArthur, California (Coaches-1)
- Derek Hagan, Arizona St. (Coaches-2)
- Jason Hill, Washington St. (Coaches-2)

=== Tight ends ===
- Alex Smith, Stanford (Coaches-1)
- Tim Day, Oregon (Coaches-2)
- Marcedes Lewis, UCLA (Coaches-2)

=== Centers ===
- Marvin Philip, California (Coaches-1)
- Mike McCloskey, UCLA (Coaches-2)

=== Offensive linemen ===
- Calvin Armstrong, Washington St. (Coaches-1)
- Ryan O'Callaghan, California (Coaches-1)
- Grayling Love, Arizona St. (Coaches-1)
- Doug Nienhuis, Oregon St. (Coaches-1)
- Adam Snyder, Oregon (Coaches-1)
- Sam Lightbody, Washington St. (Coaches-2)
- Steven Vieira, UCLA (Coaches-2)
- Sam Baker, USC (Coaches-2)
- Andrew Carnahan, Arizona St. (Coaches-2)

== Defensive selections ==
=== Defensive linemen ===
- Bill Swancutt, Oregon St. (Coaches-1)
- Mike Patterson, USC (Coaches-1)
- Shaun Cody, USC (Coaches-1)
- Ryan Riddle, California (Coaches-1)
- Haloti Ngata, Oregon (Coaches-2)
- Jimmy Verdon, Arizona St. (Coaches-2)
- Manase Hopoi, Washington (Coaches-2)
- Lorenzo Alexander, California (Coaches-2)

=== Linebackers ===
- Matt Grootegoed, USC (Coaches-1)
- Lofa Tatupu, USC (Coaches-1)
- Wendell Hunter, California (Coaches-1)
- Will Derting, Washington St. (Coaches-2)
- Spencer Havner, UCLA (Coaches-2)
- Jon Alston, Stanford (Coaches-2)
- Trent Bray, Oregon St. (Coaches-2)

=== Defensive backs ===
- Mitch Meeuwsen, Oregon St. (Coaches-1)
- Matt Clark, UCLA (Coaches-1)
- Matt Giordano, California (Coaches-1)
- Riccardo Stewart, Arizona St. (Coaches-1)
- Darrell Brooks, Arizona (Coaches-2)
- Aric Williams, Oregon St. (Coaches-2)
- Darnell Bing, USC (Coaches-2)
- Brandon Browner, Oregon St. (Coaches-2)

== Special teams ==
=== Placekickers ===
- Justin Medlock, UCLA (Coaches-1)
- Alexis Serna, Oregon St. (Coaches-2)

=== Punters ===
- Tom Malone, USC (Coaches-1)
- Chris Kluwe, UCLA (Coaches-2)

=== Return specialists/All purpose ===
- T. J. Rushing, Stanford (Coaches-1)
- Reggie Bush, USC (Coaches-1)
- Michael Okwo, Stanford (Coaches-1)
- Reggie Bush, USC (Coaches-2)
- Maurice Jones-Drew, UCLA (Coaches-2)
- Michael Bumpus, Washington St. (Coaches-2)
- Desmond Reed, USC (Coaches-2)
- Byron Storer, California (Coaches-2)

== Key ==
Coaches = selected by the conference coaches

== See also ==
- 2004 College Football All-America Team
