= Alexis Serna =

American gridiron football player (born 1985)

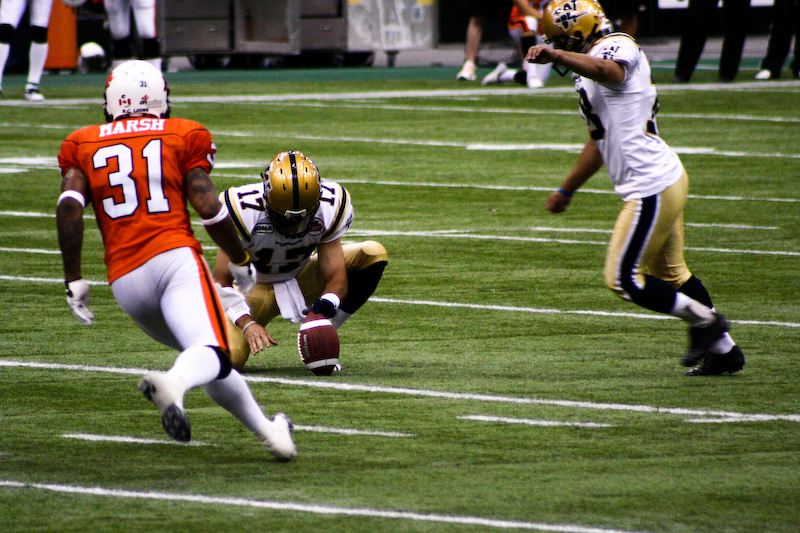
- Serna (far right) kicking a field goal

No. 18
- Position: Kicker

Personal information
- Born: February 8, 1985 (age 41); Upland, California, U.S.
- Listed height: 5 ft 7 in (1.70 m)
- Listed weight: 170 lb (77 kg)

Career information
- High school: A. B. Miller (Fontana, California)
- College: Oregon State (2004–2007)
- NFL draft: 2008: undrafted

Career history
- 2008–2010: Winnipeg Blue Bombers

Awards and highlights
- Lou Groza Award (2005); First-team All-American (2005); First-team All-Pac-10 (2005); 3× Second-team All-Pac-10 (2004, 2006, 2007)

Career CFL statistics
- Field goals made: 82
- Field goals attempted: 114
- Field goal percentage: 71.9%
- Points scored: 361
- Stats at CFL.ca

Alexis Serna (born February 8, 1985) is an American former football placekicker who played in the Canadian Football League (CFL) from 2008 to 2010 with the Winnipeg Blue Bombers. He played college football for the Oregon State Beavers, where he won the Lou Groza Award in 2005.

== High school ==
He graduated from A. B. Miller High School in Fontana, California.

== College career ==
=== 2004 season ===
Serna leads what has been described as a storybook college career, one that did not start out on the best foot. His first game as the starting kicker for Oregon State was a trial by fire. The Beavers opened the 2004 season visiting the reigning 2003 BCS national champions LSU Tigers in their famously raucous Tiger Stadium. The Beavers gave the heavily favored Tigers a very close game, however Serna, then a walk-on redshirt freshman, became the focal point when he missed three extra point (PAT) attempts in a game the Beavers lost by one point, 22–21. Complicating matters for Serna, the game ended in an exciting overtime period that hinged on him kicking a PAT to keep the Beavers in the game. When he missed, he immediately pulled off his own helmet and yelled in frustration. An Associated Press photographer caught the moment, and the resulting photo became well publicized by the sports media as a poignant symbol of the trials of kickers in a week where a number of other kickers also missed key kicks.

After the heartbreaking loss and the surge in press coverage, Serna received hundreds of letters of support from people across the country. One of these letters came from 12-year-old Austan Pierce, a boy receiving cancer treatment from Sacred Heart Children's Hospital in Spokane, Washington. Serna was so moved by his words of encouragement that he wrote an "A" on his left thumb and a "P" on his right thumb before each game from then on, to remind him of Austan's words. Serna went on to complete 29 consecutive extra points and make 17 of 20 field goals in the remainder of the season, earning Pac-10 special teams Player of the Week twice and becoming a semi-finalist for the 2004 Lou Groza Award in the process. By the end of the season, the same media outlets that had commented on Serna's struggle as a kicker touted his subsequent success. He was also named to the College Football News Freshman All-American second team. and to The Sporting News Freshman All-American first team.

=== 2005 season ===
In the 2005 season he put up even more impressive numbers on his way to winning the Lou Groza Award and several All-American titles, including a place on the AFCA Coaches' All-America First Team. Austan's cancer going into remission, Serna met Austan for the first time after a victory over Washington State in the 2005 season. After the meeting he is quoted as saying "For a boy who has already endured more pain and hurt at age 12 than most of us will ever experience in our own lifetime, Austan is courageous as they come." Alexis went on to win the Lou Groza award in 2005.

=== 2006 season ===
He returned to play in the 2006–07 season for the Beavers. At the October 28, 2006, meeting with the then-#3-ranked University of Southern California Trojans football team, Serna successfully kicked four of six field goals (measuring 47, 31, 53, and 20 yards each, with one being blocked) and three extra points. The Beavers won 33–31, ending the Trojans' impressive 38-game regular-season winning streak. Serna capped the season with a game-winning field goal over rival University of Oregon in the 110th edition of the annual Civil War game at Reser Stadium.

=== 2007 season ===
Serna returned for his senior season as the starting placekicker. Due to 2006 punter Kyle Loomis' last-minute departure from the program, Serna was also expected to be the starting punter for the season.

Serna was named to Athlon Sports All-America Second Team at placekicker.

== Professional career ==
Serna was signed by the Winnipeg Blue Bombers on June 3, 2008, to compete with embattled 17-year veteran Troy Westwood in training camp. After Westwood was released in training camp, Serna became the lone kicker/punter on the roster. After starting his pro career 7 for 7 for field goals, he followed by going 10 for 20 and making 17 of the remaining 24 of the season to finish 34 of 51. He became heavily criticized by the media, by then head coach Doug Berry and public at large during his mid-season struggles.

Starting the 2009 campaign, punter Mike Renaud was brought in to allow Serna to concentrate on place kicking. As of week 7, he has been 14 for 17, and 24 for 28 stretching back to the 2008 season, proving to be one of the most consistent kickers in the CFL.

On August 10, 2010, Serna was released by the Blue Bombers. He has since retired from professional football. Serna now works for the Oregon State University's Beaver football team, as the director of the Beyond Football program.

== Legacy ==
Serna holds several Oregon State records, including kicking the most field goals in a single game (6 vs. Washington in an 18–10 victory in 2005), which is also tied for the Pac-10 record, and only one behind the NCAA record of 7. He also holds the Oregon State record for consecutive successful extra points at 144.
