= Mike Hass =

American football player (born 1983)

No. 83, 18
- Position: Wide receiver

Personal information
- Born: January 2, 1983 (age 43); Portland, Oregon, U.S.
- Listed height: 6 ft 1 in (1.85 m)
- Listed weight: 206 lb (93 kg)

Career information
- High school: Jesuit (Beaverton, Oregon)
- College: Oregon State
- NFL draft: 2006: 6th round, 171st overall pick

Career history
- New Orleans Saints (2006)*; Chicago Bears (2006–2008); Seattle Seahawks (2009); Omaha Nighthawks (2010–2011)
- * Offseason or practice squad member only

Awards and highlights
- Biletnikoff Award (2005); First-team All-American (2005); Third-team All-American (2004); 2× First-team All-Pac-10 (2004, 2005)
- Stats at Pro Football Reference
- College Football Hall of Fame

Mike Hass (born January 2, 1983) is an American former professional football player who was a wide receiver in the National Football League (NFL). He played college football for the Oregon State Beavers, earning first-team All-American honors in 2005. He was selected by the New Orleans Saints in the sixth round of the 2006 NFL draft. He was also a member of the Chicago Bears, Seattle Seahawks and Omaha Nighthawks. Hass was inducted to the College Football Hall of Fame in 2022.

== Early life ==
Hass played on the varsity football team as a wide receiver and defensive back at Jesuit High School for three years. He helped lead the team to an OSAA 4A State Championship in 2000 over North Medford High School as a senior, recording 79 receptions for 1,739 yards and 21 touchdowns. He finished the championship game with an interception return for a touchdown. In the quarterfinals against co-#1 team and rival Central Catholic he scored a state playoff-game record seven touchdowns. He was on the First-team All-State Offense and Defense, First-team All-Metro Offense and Defense, and was the OSAA Football Offensive Player of the Year in 2000. Despite his gaudy statistics as a senior, he was not offered a single NCAA Division 1 scholarship and elected to walk-on at Oregon State.

== College career ==
Hass was a starting wide receiver for Oregon State University from 2003 - 2005. Although he was an outstanding player in high school, most college scouts felt his limited size and speed would prevent him from excelling at the collegiate level, and was not offered a football scholarship by any Division I schools, and ended up as a walk-on at Oregon State. After playing mostly on special teams in 2002, he was awarded a scholarship and a starting role as he broke out with the first of three consecutive 1,000+ receiving yard seasons in 2003. He kept the pace in 2004, breaking more school and conference records on his way to being named a Third-team All-American.

In 2005, his senior season, Hass won the Fred Biletnikoff Award and was named an AP, Walter Camp and ESPN First-team All-American. He was invited to the 81st annual East-West Shrine Game recording four receptions for 107 yards, including the game-winning touchdown for the West.

In 2022 Hass was inducted into the College Football Hall of Fame for his record-setting performance as a Beaver.

=== Records ===
Despite only playing three seasons, Hass currently holds many Oregon State records, as well as several Pac-10 records. Some of these include:

- The first receiver in Oregon State and Pac-10 history to have three consecutive 1,000-yard seasons, and is only the 10th player in NCAA history to do so.
- Holds the Oregon State record and is third in the Pac-10 for receiving yards in a career with 3,924
- The only player in Oregon State and Pac-10 history with two 225-plus yards receiving games.
- His 293 receiving yards against Boise State in 2004 is an Oregon State and Pac-10 record for most receiving yards in a single game.
- His 14 receptions against Arizona State in 2004 is an Oregon State record for most receptions in a game.
- His 20 receiving touchdowns ties him for the school record for receiving touchdowns in a career.
- His 90 receptions in the 2005 season is an Oregon State record for most receptions in a single season.
- His 220 receptions in his college career was an Oregon State record for most receptions in a career
- His 1,532 receiving yards in the 2005 season is an Oregon State and Pac-10 (Not including pac-12 records) record for most receiving yards in a single season.

== Professional career ==
Pre-draft measurables
Height	Weight	Arm length	Hand span	40-yard dash	10-yard split	20-yard split	20-yard shuttle	Three-cone drill	Vertical jump	Broad jump
6 ft 0 5/8 in (1.84 m)	208 lb (94 kg)	30 5/8 in (0.78 m)	9 1/2 in (0.24 m)	4.58 s	1.59 s	2.62 s	4.14 s	6.52 s	36.5 in (0.93 m)	9 ft 8 in (2.95 m)
All values from NFL Combine/Pro Day

=== New Orleans Saints ===
Although some pre-draft analysis had Hass projected as a third or fourth round pick, he was selected in the sixth round (171st overall) of the 2006 NFL draft by the New Orleans Saints.

It was reported by writers Jim Beseda and Paul Bucker of The Oregonian that Heisman Trophy winner Reggie Bush played a part in the selection, putting in a good word for Hass with Saints' executives. It was also reported that Bush had requested for Hass to be his roommate at the rookie mini-camp, but Hass ended up rooming with cornerback Josh Lay instead. Hass wore jersey #18 with the Saints, a change from the #28 he wore in college due to the NFL's positional jersey numbering rules. On July 27, 2006, Hass signed a three-year contract with the Saints, details were undisclosed. He recorded three receptions for 28 yards in his first preseason game on August 12 against the Tennessee Titans. However, he was released by the Saints on September 3, 2006.

=== Chicago Bears ===
The Chicago Bears signed Hass to their practice roster on September 4, 2006. He remained there throughout the season, until the team signed him to their active roster on February 8, 2007. During the next preseason finale, he made a leaping touchdown catch. He finally earned a spot on the Bears' active roster as the team's sixth wide receiver on September 1, 2007.

On August 29, 2008, Hass was waived by the Bears. He was re-signed to the team's practice squad on September 30, only to be released again on October 11. He was re-signed to the practice squad on October 15. Hass was released again on December 23.

=== Seattle Seahawks ===
Hass was signed to a future contract by the Seattle Seahawks on January 7, 2009. Despite scoring a touchdown in the first preseason game, Hass was cut by Seattle on September 5, 2009. He was signed to the Seahawks' practice squad two days later. On November 3, the Seahawks signed Hass to their 53-man roster.

On November 12, 2009, Hass was moved to the Seahawks practice squad. He was promoted to the active roster again on December 26 when the team waived defensive end Derek Walker. Hass was placed on injured reserve with a dislocated shoulder on December 30.

On August 23, 2010, Hass was released by the Seahawks.

He played in just two regular games in the NFL.

=== Omaha Nighthawks ===
Hass was signed by the Omaha Nighthawks of the United Football League on August 31, 2010.

== Post-football life ==
After playing with the Nighthawks in 2010, Hass left football to pursue a career with Nike, Inc. He worked for the company's development department and designs sporting equipment. He now is a project manager at Pacific Geosource. He is married to his wife, Rebecca and has two kids Logan and Gwyneth.

== See also ==
- List of NCAA major college football yearly receiving leaders
