= 1987 Arizona State Sun Devils football team =

American college football season

1987 Arizona State Sun Devils football

Freedom Bowl champion

Freedom Bowl, W 33–28 vs. Air Force
- Conference: Pacific-10 Conference

Ranking
- AP: No. 20
- Record: 7–4–1 (3–3–1 Pac-10)
- Head coach: John Cooper (3rd season)
- Offensive coordinator: Jim Colletto (3rd season)
- Defensive coordinator: Larry Marmie (3rd season)
- Home stadium: Sun Devil Stadium

1987 Pacific-10 Conference football standings
	Conf.					Overall
Team	W		L		T	W		L		T
No. 9 UCLA +	7	–	1	–	0	10	–	2	–	0
No. 18 USC +	7	–	1	–	0	8	–	4	–	0
Washington	4	–	3	–	1	7	–	4	–	1
No. 20 Arizona State	3	–	3	–	1	7	–	4	–	1
Oregon	4	–	4	–	0	6	–	5	–	0
Stanford	4	–	4	–	0	5	–	6	–	0
Arizona	2	–	3	–	3	4	–	4	–	3
California	2	–	3	–	2	3	–	6	–	2
Washington State	1	–	5	–	1	3	–	7	–	1
Oregon State	0	–	7	–	0	2	–	9	–	0
+ – Conference co-champions; Rankings from AP Poll

The 1987 Arizona State Sun Devils football team was an American football team that represented Arizona State University as a member of the Pacific-10 Conference (Pac-10) during the 1987 NCAA Division I-A football season. In their third season under head coach John Cooper, the Sun Devils compiled a 7–4–1 record (3–3–1 against Pac-10 opponents), finished in fourth place in the Pac-10, and outscored their opponents by a combined total of 334 to 263.

The team's statistical leaders included Daniel Ford with 1,756 passing yards, Darryl Harris with 948 rushing yards, and Aaron Cox with 870 receiving yards.

== Schedule ==
Date	Opponent	Rank	Site	Result	Attendance	Source
September 12	at Illinois*	No. 15	Memorial Stadium; Champaign, IL	W 21–7	70,060	
September 19	Pacific (CA)*	No. 15	Sun Devil Stadium; Tempe, AZ	W 31–12	70,091	
September 26	No. 2 Nebraska*	No. 12	Sun Devil Stadium; Tempe, AZ	L 28–35	71,264	
October 3	UTEP*	No. 13	Sun Devil Stadium; Tempe, AZ	W 35–16	70,372	
October 10	at Washington	No. 13	Husky Stadium; Seattle, WA	L 14–27	73,883	
October 17	Washington State		Sun Devil Stadium; Tempe, AZ	W 38–7	70,341	
October 24	at Oregon State		Parker Stadium; Corvallis, OR	W 30–21	20,595	
October 31	No. 7 UCLA		Sun Devil Stadium; Tempe, AZ	L 31–23	70,754	
November 7	Oregon		Sun Devil Stadium; Tempe, AZ	W 37–17	69,932	
November 14	at California		California Memorial Stadium; Berkeley, CA	L 20–38	38,000	
November 28	Arizona		Sun Devil Stadium; Tempe, AZ (rivalry)	T 24–24	70,839	
December 30	vs. Air Force*		Anaheim Stadium; Anaheim, CA (Freedom Bowl)	W 33–28	33,261	
*Non-conference game; Rankings from AP Poll released prior to the game

== Roster ==
1987 Arizona State Sun Devils football team roster
Players
Coaches
Offense

Pos.	#	Name	Class
WR	84	Aaron Cox	Sr
QB	7	Daniel Ford	Jr
WR	85	Chris Garrett	Jr
RB	12	Darryl Harris	Sr
WR	17	Tony Johnson	So
QB	10	Paul Justin	Fr
OL	65	Todd Kalis	Jr
OL	66	Scott Kirby	Jr
G	62	Randall McDaniel	Jr
QB	11	John Walker	Jr

Defense

Pos.	#	Name	Class
DB	25	Eric Allen	Sr
DL	93	Trace Armstrong	Sr
DB	26	Robby Boyd	Jr
LB	36	Greg Clark	Sr
DB	18	Lynn James	So
DL	97	Shawn Patterson	Sr

Special teams

Pos.	#	Name	Class
P	6	Mike Schuh	Jr

Head coach

- John Cooper

Coordinators/assistant coaches

- Gene Huey – Wide receivers

Legend

- (C) Team captain
- (S) Suspended
- (I) Ineligible
- Injured
- Redshirt
