= 1986 Oregon State Beavers football team =

American college football season

1986 Oregon State Beavers football
- Conference: Pacific-10 Conference
- Record: 3–8 (1–6 Pac-10)
- Head coach: Dave Kragthorpe (2nd season)
- Offensive coordinator: Garth Hall (2nd season)
- Defensive coordinator: Tim Hundley (3rd season)
- Home stadium: Parker Stadium

1986 Pacific-10 Conference football standings
	Conf.					Overall
Team	W		L		T	W		L		T
No. 4 Arizona State $	5	–	1	–	1	10	–	1	–	1
No. 14 UCLA	5	–	2	–	1	8	–	3	–	1
No. 18 Washington	5	–	2	–	1	8	–	3	–	1
No. 11 Arizona	5	–	3	–	0	9	–	3	–	0
Stanford	5	–	3	–	0	8	–	4	–	0
USC	5	–	3	–	0	7	–	5	–	0
Oregon	3	–	5	–	0	5	–	6	–	0
Washington State	2	–	6	–	1	3	–	7	–	1
California	2	–	7	–	0	2	–	9	–	0
Oregon State	1	–	6	–	0	3	–	8	–	0
$ – Conference champion; Rankings from AP Poll

The 1986 Oregon State Beavers football team was an American football team from the U.S. state of Oregon. They represented Oregon State University during the 1986 NCAA Division I-A football season.

== Schedule ==
Date	Opponent	Site	Result	Attendance	Source
September 13	at Fresno State*	Bulldog Stadium; Fresno, CA	L 0–27	34,557	
September 20	at No. 3 Michigan*	Michigan Stadium; Ann Arbor, MI	L 12–31	104,748	
September 27	Stanford	Parker Stadium; Corvallis, OR	L 7–17	21,125	
October 4	at Washington State	Martin Stadium; Pullman, WA	L 14–24	25,200	
October 11	at California	California Memorial Stadium; Berkeley, CA	W 14–12	33,500	
October 18	at No. 16 Arizona	Arizona Stadium; Tucson, AZ	L 12–23	52,669	
October 25	Boise State*	Parker Stadium; Corvallis, OR	W 34–3	21,264	
November 1	No. 15 UCLA	Civic Stadium; Portland, OR	L 0–49	23,703	
November 8	No. 13 Washington	Parker Stadium; Corvallis, OR	L 12–28	29,541	
November 15	at BYU*	Cougar Stadium; Provo, UT	W 10–7	63,321	
November 22	Oregon	Parker Stadium; Corvallis, OR (Civil War)	L 28–49	36,204	
*Non-conference game; Rankings from AP Poll released prior to the game
