= Bill Swancutt =

American football player (born 1982)

No. 90
- Position: Defensive end

Personal information
- Born: September 4, 1982 (age 44); Salem, Oregon, U.S.
- Listed height: 6 ft 4 in (1.93 m)
- Listed weight: 264 lb (120 kg)

Career information
- High school: Sprague (Salem)
- College: Oregon State
- NFL draft: 2005: 6th round, 184th overall pick

Career history
- Detroit Lions (2005–2007); Oakland Raiders (2007)*; Baltimore Ravens (2007)*
- * Offseason or practice squad member only

Awards and highlights
- Pac-10 Co-Defensive Player of the Year (2004); Morris Trophy (2004); First-team All-Pac-10 (2004)
- Stats at Pro Football Reference

William Swancutt (born September 4, 1982) is an American former professional football player who was a defensive end in the National Football League (NFL) for three seasons. He played college football for Oregon State University, and was recognized as the conference player of the year. He was chosen by the Detroit Lions in the sixth round of the 2005 NFL draft.

== Early life ==
He was born in Salem, Oregon, and attended Sprague High School in Salem. He was recognised as a Super Prep All-American in 2000 and a Tacoma News-Tribune Northwest Nugget. Swancutt was awarded the MVP of the Valley League twice and earned class 4A's defensive player of the year. He also played a number of other sports while at the school including; basketball and baseball.

== College career ==
Swancutt received an athletic scholarship to attend Oregon State University, where he played for the Oregon State Beavers football team from 2001 to 2004. He was named Pacific-10 Conference co-defensive player of the year in 2004. He was also the 2004 recipient of the Morris Trophy, recognizing him as the outstanding defensive lineman in the Pac-10 and won the Senior Bowl defensive MVP honors. Swancutt beat current OSU records with 37 sacks and 60 stops behind the line of scrimmage (previous records held by Inoke Breckterfield) during his time at the university.

== Professional career ==
Swancutt was selected by the Detroit Lions in the sixth round, 184th overall pick, of the 2005 NFL draft. He signed with the Lions on July 15, 2005. He played his first NFL game against Baltimore Ravens in October 2005. He played in eight of the Lions' sixteen games primarily in the kickoff and kickoff return teams. He was released in July 2007 following a knee injury which occurred during training camp in 2006.

Swancutt was signed by the Oakland Raiders on July 27, 2007. He was released by the Raiders on August 1, 2007. He signed with the Baltimore Ravens on August 6, 2007. He was released by the Ravens on September 1, 2007.

== Personal life ==
While at the university, Swancutt graduated with a 3.11 grade-point average and a bachelor's degree in business finance. He currently works as a financial advisor for Merrill Lynch.

During his time with the Detroit Lions he shared an apartment with Dan Orlovsky in Dearborn, Michigan. He now lives in Salem, Oregon with his wife, daughter and son.
