= Yvenson Bernard =

American gridiron football player (born 1984)

No. 26
- Position: Running back

Personal information
- Born: October 25, 1984 (age 42); Boynton Beach, Florida, U.S.
- Listed height: 5 ft 9 in (1.75 m)
- Listed weight: 202 lb (92 kg)

Career information
- College: Oregon State
- NFL draft: 2008: undrafted

Career history
- St. Louis Rams (2008)*; Seattle Seahawks (2008)*; Winnipeg Blue Bombers (2009–2010); Montreal Alouettes (2011)*; Saskatchewan Roughriders (2011–2012)
- * Offseason or practice squad member only

Awards and highlights
- First-team All-Pac-10 (2006); Second-team All-Pac-10 (2007); Emerald Bowl Offensive MVP (2007)
- Stats at CFL.ca (archive)

Yvenson Bernard (EVAN-son; born October 25, 1984) is an American former professional football running back who played in the Canadian Football League (CFL) for the Winnipeg Blue Bombers and Saskatchewan Roughriders. He was signed by the St. Louis Rams as an undrafted free agent in 2008. He played college football at Oregon State.

Bernard was also a member of the Seattle Seahawks and Montreal Alouettes.

== Early life ==
Bernard was a four-year starter and played running back, fullback and strong safety at Boca Raton High School in Boca Raton, Florida. He led Florida's 5A football league in scoring his senior season with 19 touchdowns, rushing for 1,156 yards on 159 carries (7.4 average). Bernard also played baseball and was selected in the 30th round of the 2003 MLB Draft by the Minnesota Twins. His younger brother is Giovani Bernard of the Tampa Bay Buccaneers.

== College career ==
Bernard played as a running back for Oregon State University from 2004-2007.

In 2005, Bernard took the position of starting running back for the Beavers. He ended the season with 1321 yards rushing on 299 attempts (averaging 4.4 yards/carry) and finishing with 13 touchdowns. Continuing in 2006, Bernard rushed for 1309 yards on 296 attempts (averaging 4.4) with 12 touchdowns. In the Sun Bowl, he ran for the game-clinching 2-point conversion en route to an Oregon State 39-38 victory over the University of Missouri.

As a senior, Bernard was named as co-captain for the 2007 season. Despite having arthroscopic knee surgery on November 20 (and missing the Beaver's Civil War match against the University of Oregon), Bernard was able to play in the Emerald Bowl against the Maryland Terrapins. On 38 carries Bernard rushed for 177 yards and was awarded the 2007 Emerald Bowl Offensive MVP. For the season, he ended with 1214 yards rushing on 275 carries.

Bernard ended with 3,862 career rushing yards, becoming the Beaver's second all-time leading rusher behind Ken Simonton with 5,044 yards. Bernard also moved to No. 6 in the Pac-10's all-time rushing list.

== Professional career ==
Bernard became an undrafted free agent after college and was signed a few weeks later by the St. Louis Rams. The Rams later released him before the season's end. He was then signed by the Seattle Seahawks, who also cut him, leading him to sign with the Winnipeg Blue Bombers. He was released on July 16, 2009, but re-signed the next day to the practice roster.

On February 17, 2011, he signed a two-year deal with the Montreal Alouettes. After his release from the Alouettes in July, Bernard was signed by the Saskatchewan Roughriders on August 9, 2011.
