= 1987 Freedom Bowl =

- Freedom Bowl IV
Air Force Falcons	Arizona State Sun Devils
(9–3)	(6–4–1)
28	33
Head coach: Fisher DeBerry	Head coach: John Cooper
	1	2	3	4	Total
Air Force	7	7	0	14	28
Arizona State	0	24	3	6	33
- Date: December 30, 1987
- Season: 1987
- Stadium: Anaheim Stadium
- Location: Anaheim, California
- MVP: QB Daniel Ford (ASU); DT Chad Hennings (Air Force)
- Referee: Dean Cramer (Big Eight)
- Attendance: 33,261

United States TV coverage
- Network: Mizlou Television Network
- Announcers: Ray Scott and Jack Snow

The 1987 Freedom Bowl was a college football postseason bowl game between the Arizona State Sun Devils and the Air Force Falcons.

== Background ==
Air Force finished third in the Western Athletic Conference, though they won the Commander-in-Chief's Trophy (for beating Army & Navy) and the Ram-Falcon Trophy (for beating Colorado State), with this also being their fifth bowl appearance in six seasons. Arizona State finished 6th in the Pacific-10 Conference as the team was in their fourth bowl game in six seasons, and third straight under coach John Cooper. This was the first and only Freedom Bowl appearance for both teams.

== Scoring summary ==
A rainy 48 degree weather could not cloud the high scoring, especially in the second quarter. Greg Johnson ran in for a 12-yard touchdown run to give Air Force an early lead. But the second quarter proved to be Air Force's downfall. Channing Williams and Darryl Harris both scored on 2-yard touchdown runs in a span of 3:02, which made it 14–7. Alan Zendejas made it 17–7 on a 26-yard field goal. Air Force responded with a touchdown run by Albert Booker to make it 17–14 with :30 remaining. But nine seconds later, Daniel Ford threw a 61-yard pass to Aaron Cox, who ran into the end zone, making the halftime score 24–14. Zendejas added a 20-yard field goal midway in the third period, the only points of the entire quarter, as the Sun Devils turned the ball over three times in the quarter. Kirk Wendorf scored the last points for the Sun Devils to make it 33–14. With less than three minutes remaining, Lance McDowell (the third-string quarterback) led the Falcons nearly back from the brink. He started with a 10-yard touchdown pass to Steven Senn to narrow the lead. They tried to rush in for a conversion attempt to narrow it to 11, but it failed, keeping the score at 33–20. With 10 seconds remaining, McDowell narrowed the lead again, with another touchdown pass to Senn. This time the conversion attempt succeeded, making it 33–28. But it was too little, too late, as the Falcons could not get lucky a third time as the Sun Devils held on to win their second straight bowl game. Daniel Ford went 16 for 30, but had 272 yards passing in a co-MVP effort. Harris ran for 93 yards on 13 carries. For Air Force, McDowell went 5 for 7 for 66 yards with two touchdowns. Steve Letnich rushed for 90 yards on 16 carries. Chad Hennings had 12 unassisted tackles (with three for 12 yards in losses) and two sacks, named Co-MVP in a losing effort.

== Aftermath ==
Cooper left Arizona State for Ohio State after the game. The Sun Devils would not reach another bowl game for nine years. Air Force would not win a bowl game until 1990.

== Statistics ==
Statistics	Air Force	Arizona State
First downs	21	22
Yards rushing	309	187
Yards passing	117	272
Total yards	426	459
Punts-Average	7-35.0	4-44.5
Fumbles-Lost	2-1	2-2
Interceptions	2	1
Penalties-Yards	5-65	10-86
