= Mitch Meeuwsen =

American football player and coach (born 1982)

Profile
- Position: Free safety

Personal information
- Born: April 20, 1982 (age 44); Hillsboro, Oregon, U.S.
- Listed height: 6 ft 3 in (1.91 m)
- Listed weight: 210 lb (95 kg)

Career information
- High school: Forest Grove (OR)
- College: Oregon State
- NFL draft: 2005: undrafted

Career history

Playing
- Miami Dolphins (2005)*; San Diego Chargers (2006)*; Rhein Fire (2006)
- * Offseason or practice squad member only

Coaching
- Oregon State (2011–2013) Graduate assistant

Awards and highlights
- Third-team All-American (2004); First-team All-Pac-10 (2004)

Mitch Meeuwsen (born April 20, 1982) is an American former professional football player. He played college football for the Oregon State Beavers. He was later a graduate assistant football coach at his alma mater Oregon State University.

== Early life ==
Mitch Meeuwsen was born in Hillsboro but grew up in Forest Grove. Meeuwsen played football, basketball and baseball while growing up and spent the summers camping and traveling for sports with his family. Meeuwsen's parents still reside in his hometown along with many extended family members that are in the surrounding communities.

== High school ==
Meeuwsen attended Forest Grove High School in Forest Grove, Oregon. He was named an honorable mention All-America by USA Today, 1st Team All-State as a Safety, and honorable mention All-State as quarterback for the Vikings. Meeuwsen was also 3rd Team All-State in Basketball and 1st Team All-State in Baseball. He was the Pacific-8 Conference Player of the Year in all three sports. He is a 2000 graduate of Forest Grove High School.

== College career ==
Meeuwsen played for the Oregon State Beavers. He played for the Beavers from 2000 through 2004. In his time at OSU, he finished with 217 tackles, 29 passes defensed, 10.5 tackles for loss, one sack, five fumble recoveries and one forced fumble. He also set a school record of 20 career interceptions beating the 1964 record of 15 by Dan Espalin. In his first start as a red shirt freshman against UCLA, Meeuwsen recorded 10 tackles, a sack, a forced fumble, and recovered a fumble while being named ABC Player of the Game. He would go on to be named Freshman All-American. In his junior season, he intercepted six passes. In his senior season, he was chosen as a First-team All-Pac-10 selection after leading team with six interceptions and a 2004 ESPN.com All-America selection.

He graduated with a degree in geography from Oregon State.

== NFL career ==
Upon graduating from Oregon State, Meeuwsen signed with the Miami Dolphins as an undrafted rookie on April 29, 2005. The Dolphins waived him on May 12, 2005.

Meeuwsen signed a one-year contract with the San Diego Chargers on January 10, 2006. He was allocated by the San Diego Chargers to Rhein Fire of NFL Europe for 2006 season. He played in all 10 games recording 25 tackles, two sacks, a forced fumble and a pass deflection. After returning from the NFL Europe season Meeuwsen rejoined the Chargers through training camp and was released during final roster cuts after the pre-season.

== Life after football ==
Meeuwsen has spent time racing dwarf cars with the Pacific Hardtop Racing Association, racing at tracks in Oregon, Washington and California. He won a non-points main event at Coos Bay Speedway in Coos Bay, Oregon on July 4, 2008. Meeuwsen, known for his level headiness, positive attitude and being easy going, has become one of the most well liked and most respected members of the club. His breakthrough in a points race came in the 2009 season finale for the PHRA at Willamette Speedway in Lebanon, Oregon as he passed longtime successful dwarf car racer Kelly Gutches in the closing laps to win on October 3. The win was very popular within the PHRA club membership. Meeuwsen also briefly attended graduate school at Pacific University in Forest Grove before taking a job at UPS. Meeuwsen worked as a driver at UPS for 3 years before becoming a graduate assistant football coach at Oregon State.

== Current ==
Meeuwsen accepted a position in January 2011 at his college Alma mater, Oregon State University, as a graduate assistant coach for the football team he was an All-Pac 10 player for. The position of graduate assistant is a way for young coaches to break into the business of coaching college football and learn the many skills needed in the profession. Meeuwsen is working for the same coaches he played for while at Oregon State.

"Mitch Meeuwsen, who worked with the safeties, assisting secondary coach Rod Perry, moved to San Diego and is pursuing a career outside of football" [1]
