= Slade Norris =

American football player (born 1985)

No. 58, 53, 49
- Position: Linebacker

Personal information
- Born: October 25, 1985 (age 41); Portland, Oregon, U.S.
- Listed height: 6 ft 3 in (1.91 m)
- Listed weight: 245 lb (111 kg)

Career information
- High school: Jesuit (Beaverton, Oregon)
- College: Oregon State
- NFL draft: 2009: 4th round, 126th overall pick

Career history
- Oakland Raiders (2009–2010); Seattle Seahawks (2010)*; Jacksonville Jaguars (2010); Detroit Lions (2011–2012)
- * Offseason or practice squad member only

Career NFL statistics
- Total tackles: 4
- Stats at Pro Football Reference

Slade Norris (born October 25, 1985) is an American former professional football player who was a linebacker in the National Football League (NFL). He played college football for the Oregon State Beavers. He was selected by the Oakland Raiders in the fourth round of the 2009 NFL draft.

Norris was also a member of the Seattle Seahawks, Jacksonville Jaguars, and Detroit Lions.

== Professional career ==
=== Oakland Raiders ===
Norris was selected by the Oakland Raiders in the fourth round of the 2009 NFL draft with the 126th overall pick. He was released at the end of the 2009 training camp but was later re-signed to their practice squad. Norris was promoted to the active roster in November 2009. On December 30, he was placed on injured reserve due to a hamstring injury. He was released from the practice squad by the Raiders on September 23, 2010.

=== Jacksonville Jaguars ===
Norris was signed to the Jacksonville Jaguars practice squad on November 10, 2010. He was waived by the Jaguars on August 25, 2011.

== Personal life ==
Norris currently resides in Dallas, Texas.
