= Ricky Ortiz (fullback) =

American football player (born 1994)

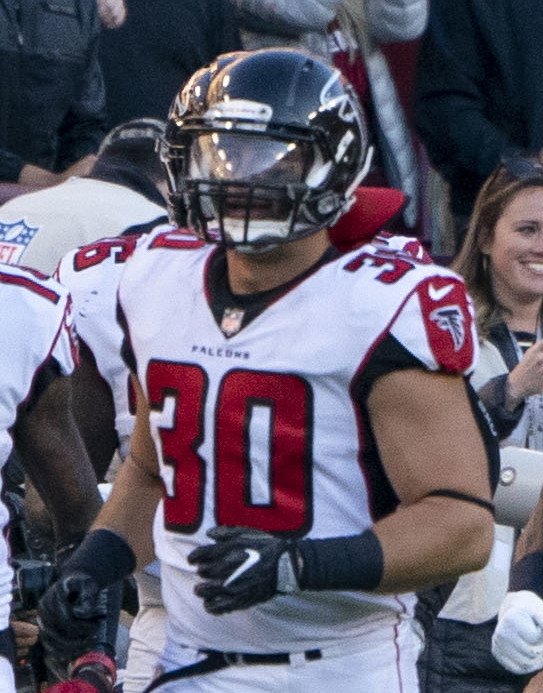
- Ortiz with the Atlanta Falcons in 2018

No. 30
- Position: Fullback

Personal information
- Born: April 15, 1994 (age 32); Moreno Valley, California, U.S.
- Listed height: 6 ft 0 in (1.83 m)
- Listed weight: 230 lb (104 kg)

Career information
- High school: Mater Dei (Santa Ana, California)
- College: Oregon State (2013–2016)
- NFL draft: 2017: undrafted

Career history
- Baltimore Ravens (2017–2018)*; Atlanta Falcons (2018); New Orleans Saints (2019)
- * Offseason or practice squad member only

Career NFL statistics
- Receptions: 4
- Receiving yards: 19
- Stats at Pro Football Reference

Ricky Ortiz (born April 15, 1994) is an American former professional football player who was a fullback in the National Football League (NFL). He played college football for the Oregon State Beavers.

== Early life ==
Ortiz attended and played high school football at Mater Dei High School.

== College career ==
Ortiz committed to Oregon State in 2013, as a fullback. Ortiz started his first career game as a fullback as a sophomore in 2014, where he had no rush attempts, but 12 catches for 90 yards and no touchdowns. Ortiz switched to tight end during the 2015 season, as well as briefly to linebacker. His linebacker stint did not last long, but he did make some starts at tight end during 2015 and 2016. In 2015, he had no receptions (because he was primarily used as a blocker), but in 2016, he had 5 receptions for 34 yards, scoring his only college touchdown. He was also a core special teams player, racking up 47 tackles in his collegiate career, the 2nd most special teams tackles on the Beavers. He split time from halfback, tight end, fullback, and linebacker.

== Professional career ==
=== Baltimore Ravens ===
Ortiz signed with the Baltimore Ravens on April 29, 2017, as an undrafted free agent. He was waived by the Ravens on September 2, 2017, and was signed to the practice squad the next day. He was released on October 3, 2017, but was re-signed on November 14, 2017. He signed a future/reserve contract on January 2, 2018. He was released by the Ravens on May 7, 2018.

=== Atlanta Falcons ===
Ortiz signed with the Atlanta Falcons on May 23, 2018. He made his NFL debut in the season opener against the Philadelphia Eagles. He was the starting fullback in the 18–12 loss. On September 2, 2019, the Falcons waived Ortiz with an injury settlement.

=== New Orleans Saints ===
On November 22, 2019, Ortiz was signed to the New Orleans Saints practice squad. He was released on December 4, 2019. He was re-signed to the active roster on December 28, 2019. He was waived on August 2, 2020.

== Trivia ==
Outside of football, Ortiz's heart yearns to become an avocado farmer.
