= LaDairis Jackson =

American football player (born 1979)

No. 94
- Position: Defensive end

Personal information
- Born: June 16, 1979 (age 47); Denver, Colorado, U.S.
- Listed height: 6 ft 2 in (1.88 m)
- Listed weight: 261 lb (118 kg)

Career information
- College: El Camino, Oregon State
- NFL draft: 2001: undrafted

Career history
- Seattle Seahawks (2001)*; Washington Redskins (2002–2003); Cincinnati Bengals (2003–2004); Chicago Rush (2007)*
- * Offseason or practice squad member only
- Stats at Pro Football Reference

LaDairis G. Jackson (born June 16, 1979) is an American former professional football defensive end who played for the Washington Redskins of the National Football League (NFL). He played college football at El Camino Junior College and Oregon State.

== Early life ==
Jackson attended Alief Elsik High School in Houston, Texas.

== College career ==
Jackson first played college football at El Camino Junior College from 1997 to 1998.

He transferred to play for Oregon State from 1999 to 2000. He recorded 46 tackles and a school-record 11.5 sacks his senior year in 2000, earning honorable mention All-Pac-10 honors.

== Professional career ==
Jackson signed with the Seattle Seahawks on April 27, 2001 after going undrafted in the 2001 NFL draft. He was released on August 30, 2001.

Jackson signed a reserve/future contract with the Washington Redskins on January 23, 2002. He played in 15 games for the Redskins during the 2002 season, recording 12 solo tackles, four assisted tackles, 2.5 sacks and one pass breakup. He also returned one kick for 0 yards while fumbling the ball. Jackson was placed on injured reserve on December 23, 2002. He was waived by the Redskins on October 21, 2003.

Jackson was claimed on waivers by the Cincinnati Bengals on October 22, 2003. He was waived on November 25, 2003 but later signed a reserve/future contract with the Bengals on January 27, 2004. He was waived/injured on August 23, 2004 and reverted to injured reserve the next day. Jackson was waived by the Bengals on March 28, 2005. He did not play in any games for the Bengals.

Jackson signed with the Chicago Rush of the Arena Football League on January 4, 2007. He was waived on February 14, 2007.
