= Markus Wheaton =

American football player (born 1991)

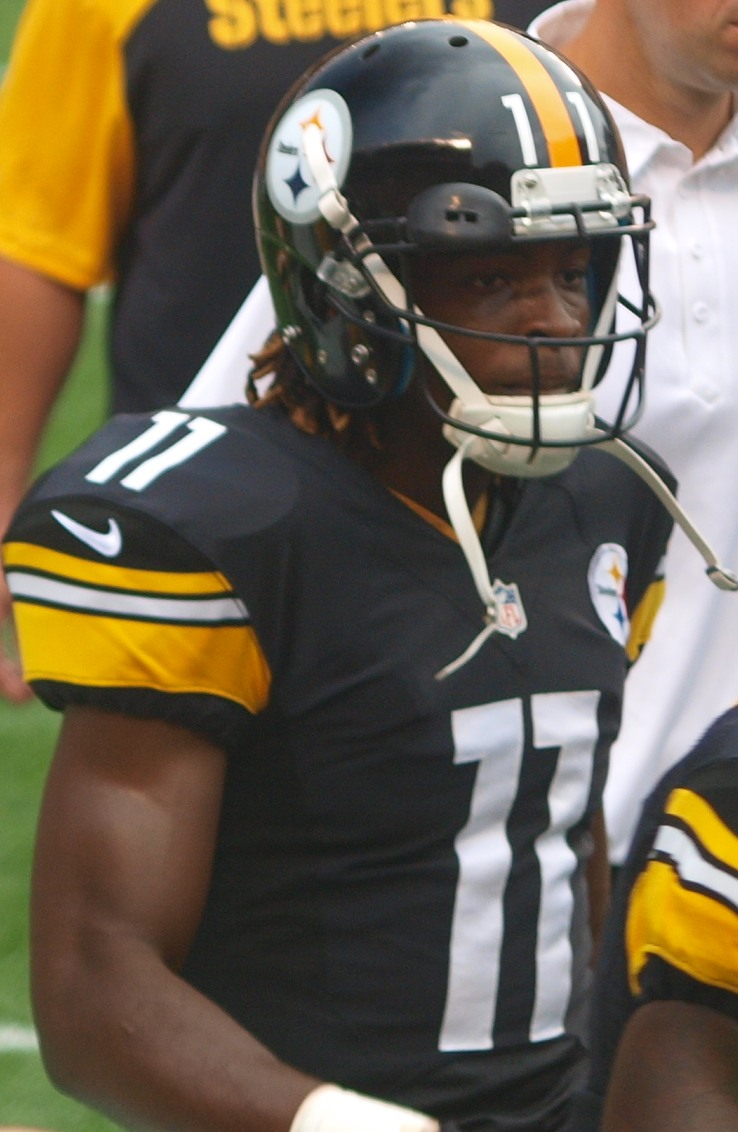
- Wheaton with the Pittsburgh Steelers in 2013

No. 11, 12, 80
- Position: Wide receiver

Personal information
- Born: February 7, 1991 (age 35); Phoenix, Arizona, U.S.
- Listed height: 5 ft 11 in (1.80 m)
- Listed weight: 185 lb (84 kg)

Career information
- High school: Chandler (Chandler, Arizona)
- College: Oregon State (2009–2012)
- NFL draft: 2013: 3rd round, 79th overall pick

Career history
- Pittsburgh Steelers (2013–2016); Chicago Bears (2017); Philadelphia Eagles (2018)

Awards and highlights
- First-team All-Pac-12 (2012)

Career NFL statistics
- Receptions: 110
- Receiving yards: 1,559
- Receiving touchdowns: 8
- Stats at Pro Football Reference

Markus Levonte Wheaton (born February 7, 1991) is an American former professional football player who was a wide receiver in the National Football League (NFL). He played college football for the Oregon State Beavers and was selected by the Pittsburgh Steelers in the third round (79th overall) of the 2013 NFL draft. He also played for the Chicago Bears and Philadelphia Eagles.

== Early life ==
Wheaton was born in Phoenix, Arizona. He attended Mountain Pointe High School, and played for the Mountain Pointe Pride high school football team from 2005–2007. He had 23 receptions for 476 yards and six touchdowns as a junior, and added 49 tackles on defense. He also attended Chandler High School, and played for the Chandler Wolves high school football team. He recorded 736 yards receiving on 37 receptions with four touchdowns as a senior. He was a three-time first-team all-region and honorable mention all-state selection. Considered a three-star recruit by Rivals.com, he was rated the No. 41 athlete in the nation. He committed to Oregon State. Wheaton was also a standout sprinter for the Chandler High School track team. He won both the 200-meter dash (21.42s) and 400-meter dash (47.38s) at the 2009 Chandler Invitationals. He also ran a season-best time of 10.81 seconds in the 100 meters at the 2009 5AI State Championships.

== College career ==
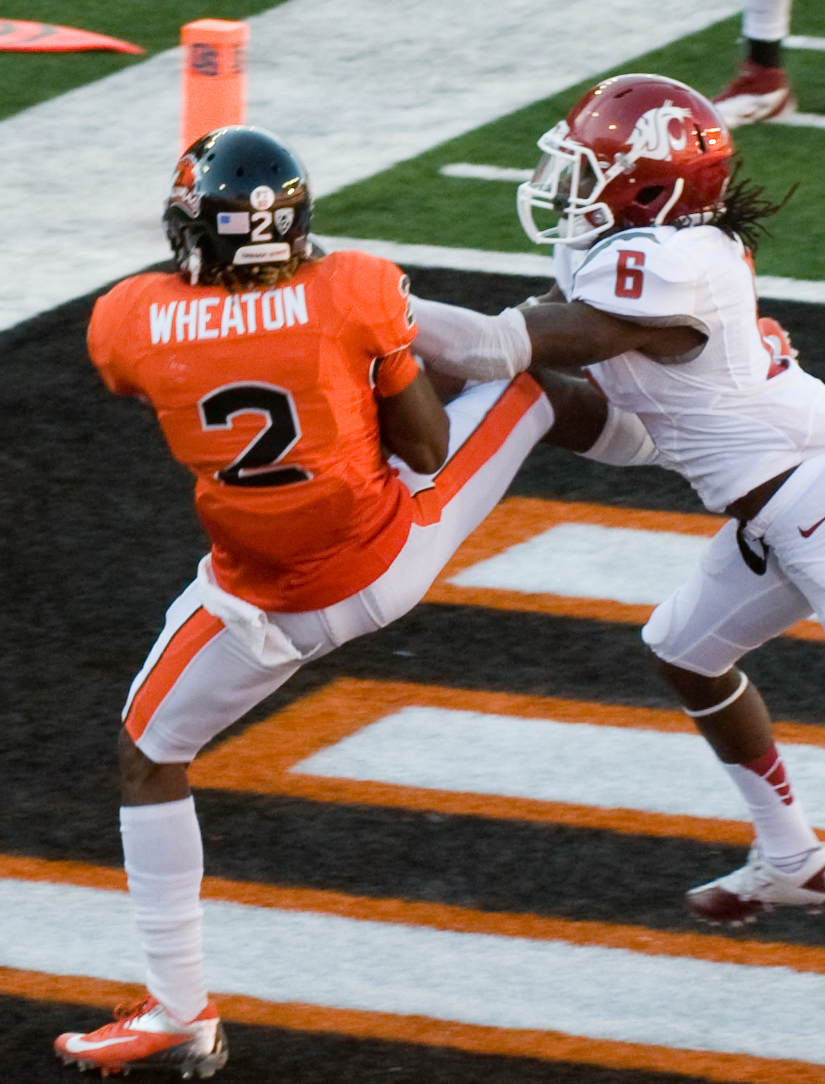
Wheaton with Oregon State Beavers in 2012

While attending Oregon State University, Wheaton played for the Oregon State Beavers football team from 2009 to 2012. As a senior in 2012, he was a first-team All-Pac-12 Conference selection. During his college career, he recorded 227 receptions for 2,994 yards and 16 touchdowns.

Wheaton was also on the Oregon State University track team. He ran a career-best time of 46.80 seconds in the 400 meters at the prelims of the 5A Fiesta Regional Championships. He finished 2nd in the 100 meters at the 2012 Oregon Twilight Meet, with a time of 10.58 seconds. He was also timed at 10.35 seconds in the 100 meters.

== Professional career ==
Pre-draft measurables
Height	Weight	Arm length	Hand span	40-yard dash	10-yard split	20-yard split	20-yard shuttle	Three-cone drill	Vertical jump	Broad jump	Bench press
5 ft 11 in (1.80 m)	189 lb (86 kg)	32 3/4 in (0.83 m)	9 1/8 in (0.23 m)	4.45 s	1.60 s	2.63 s	4.02 s	6.80 s	37 in (0.94 m)	10 ft 0 in (3.05 m)	20 reps
All values from the NFL Combine.

=== Pittsburgh Steelers ===
==== 2013 season ====
The Pittsburgh Steelers picked Wheaton in the third round, with the 79th overall pick, of the 2013 NFL draft. He signed a 4-year contract for $2.81 million with $591,000 guaranteed.

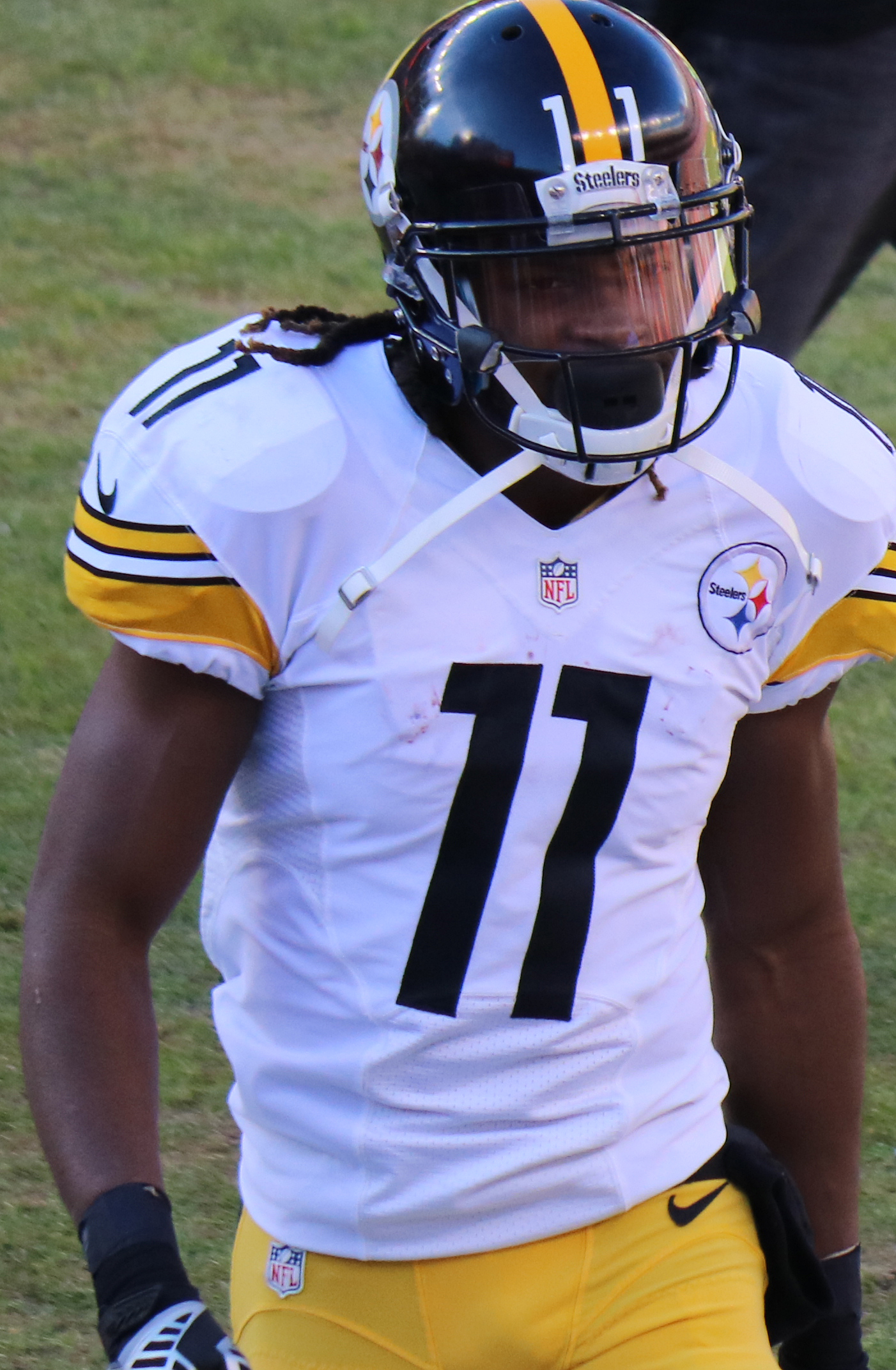
Wheaton with the Steelers in Jan. 2016

Wheaton made his NFL debut on September 8, 2013, against the Tennessee Titans. On September 29, 2013, Wheaton made his first career start and made 3 catches for 26 yards in a 34–27 loss to the Minnesota Vikings. During a Week 11 matchup with the Detroit Lions, he made a season-high 3 receptions for 38 yards. He finished his rookie season with 6 catches for 64 yards in 12 games and 1 start.

==== 2014 season ====
During the 2014 offseason, the Steelers lost veteran wide receiver Emmanuel Sanders to the Denver Broncos via free agency. With the loss of Sanders, Wheaton was given a larger role in the offense.

On September 7, 2014, he started the season opener against the Cleveland Browns and ended the game with a season-high 6 receptions and 97 yards. In Week 8, Wheaton made 5 catches for 56-yards and caught his first career touchdown in a 51–34 victory over the Indianapolis Colts. The next game, he caught 2 passes for 62 receiving yards and scored a 47-yard touchdown in a win over the Baltimore Ravens. He played in his first career postseason game on January 3, 2015, and made 5 receptions for 66-yards in a 17-30 loss to the Ravens. He finished his second season with 53 receptions, 644 receiving yards, and 2 touchdowns in 11 starts and 16 games.

==== 2015 season ====
Wheaton began appearing more in the slot position as Martavis Bryant emerged last season. With Bryant becoming more solidified in the offense, Wheaton was poised to become a full-time receiver during 2015. Wheaton began the season starting against the New England Patriots and caught 3 passes for 55-yards in a 28–21 loss. On October 12, 2015, he caught a 72-yard touchdown pass from Michael Vick in a 24–20 victory at the San Diego Chargers. During a Week 12 loss at Seattle, Wheaton made a career-high 9 catches for 201-yards and scores on a 69-yard touchdown. On December 20, 2015, he continued to make progress as he made 6 receptions for 62-yards and a touchdown in a 34–27 victory over the Denver Broncos. Wheaton finished the regular season with 44 receptions for 749 yards and five touchdowns, and his 17.0 yards per reception was ninth among NFL wide receivers in 2015.

==== 2016 season ====
Wheaton played in three games in the 2016 season with two starts recording four catches for 51 yards and a touchdown before suffering a shoulder injury. He was placed on injured reserve on November 19, 2016.

=== Chicago Bears ===
On March 10, 2017, Wheaton signed a two-year contract with the Chicago Bears.

On March 14, 2018, Wheaton was released by the Bears after recording only three receptions for 41 yards in 2017.

=== Philadelphia Eagles ===
On May 2, 2018, Wheaton signed a one-year contract with the Philadelphia Eagles. He was released by the team on September 12, 2018. He retired on January 22, 2019.

== Career statistics ==
=== NFL ===
==== Regular season ====
Year	Team	Games		Receiving					Rushing					Fumbles	
Year	Team	GP	GS	Rec	Yds	Avg	Lng	TD	Att	Yds	Avg	Lng	TD	Fum	Lost
2013	PIT	12	1	6	64	10.7	21	0	0	0	0.0	0	0	0	0
2014	PIT	16	11	53	644	12.2	47	2	4	19	4.8	12	0	0	0
2015	PIT	16	8	44	749	17.0	72	5	0	0	0.0	0	0	0	0
2016	PIT	3	2	4	51	12.8	30	1	0	0	0.0	0	0	0	0
2017	CHI	11	0	3	41	17.0	22	0	0	0	0.0	0	0	0	0
Total		58	22	110	1,549	14.2	72	8	4	19	4.8	12	0	0	0

==== Postseason ====
Year	Team	Games		Receiving					Rushing					Fumbles	
Year	Team	GP	GS	Rec	Yds	Avg	Lng	TD	Att	Yds	Avg	Lng	TD	Fum	Lost
2014	PIT	1	0	5	66	13.2	17	0	0	0	0.0	0	0	0	0
2015	PIT	2	2	7	53	7.6	24	0	0	0	0.0	0	0	0	0
Total		3	2	12	119	9.9	24	0	0	0	0.0	0	0	0	0

=== College ===
Season	GP	Receiving						Rushing			
Season	GP	Rec	Yds	Avg	Lng	100+	TD	Att	Yds	Avg	TD
2009	12	8	89	11.1	25	0	0	11	79	7.2	1
2010	12	55	675	12.3	48	2	4	27	220	8.1	2
2011	12	73	986	13.5	69	4	1	25	190	7.6	0
2012	13	91	1,244	13.7	51	5	11	20	142	7.1	2
Total		227	2,994	13.2	69	11	16	83	631	7.6	5

== Personal life ==
Wheaton's cousin, Kenny Wheaton, played defensive back for the Dallas Cowboys.
