= 1987 Oregon State Beavers football team =

American college football season

1987 Oregon State Beavers football
- Conference: Pacific-10 Conference
- Record: 2–9 (0–7 Pac-10)
- Head coach: Dave Kragthorpe (3rd season)
- Offensive coordinator: Garth Hall (3rd season)
- Defensive coordinator: Tim Hundley (4th season)
- Home stadium: Parker Stadium

1987 Pacific-10 Conference football standings
| | Conf. | | | | | Overall |
| Team | W | | L | | T | W | | L | | T |
|---|---|---|---|---|---|---|---|---|---|---|
| No. 9 UCLA + | 7 | – | 1 | – | 0 | 10 | – | 2 | – | 0 |
| No. 18 USC + | 7 | – | 1 | – | 0 | 8 | – | 4 | – | 0 |
| Washington | 4 | – | 3 | – | 1 | 7 | – | 4 | – | 1 |
| No. 20 Arizona State | 3 | – | 3 | – | 1 | 7 | – | 4 | – | 1 |
| Oregon | 4 | – | 4 | – | 0 | 6 | – | 5 | – | 0 |
| Stanford | 4 | – | 4 | – | 0 | 5 | – | 6 | – | 0 |
| Arizona | 2 | – | 3 | – | 3 | 4 | – | 4 | – | 3 |
| California | 2 | – | 3 | – | 2 | 3 | – | 6 | – | 2 |
| Washington State | 1 | – | 5 | – | 1 | 3 | – | 7 | – | 1 |
| Oregon State | 0 | – | 7 | – | 0 | 2 | – | 9 | – | 0 |
+ – Conference co-champions; Rankings from AP Poll

The 1987 Oregon State Beavers football team represented Oregon State University in the Pacific-10 Conference (Pac-10) during the 1987 NCAA Division I-A football season. In their third season under head coach Dave Kragthorpe, the Beavers compiled a 2–9 record (0–7 against Pac-10 opponents), finished in last place in the Pac-10, and were outscored by their opponents, 433 to 189. The team played its home games at Parker Stadium in Corvallis, Oregon.

== Schedule ==
| Date | Opponent | Site | Result | Attendance | Source |
|---|---|---|---|---|---|
| September 12 | at No. 20 Georgia* | Sanford Stadium; Athens, GA | L 7–41 | 73,211 | |
| September 19 | San Jose State* | Parker Stadium; Corvallis, OR | W 36–34 | 24,342 | |
| September 26 | at Texas* | Texas Memorial Stadium; Austin, TX | L 16–61 | 53,389 | |
| October 3 | at USC | Los Angeles Memorial Coliseum; Los Angeles, CA | L 14–48 | 47,979 | |
| October 10 | Akron* | Parker Stadium; Corvallis, OR | W 42–26 | 23,516 | |
| October 17 | at Arizona | Arizona Stadium; Tucson, AZ | L 17–31 | 48,494 | |
| October 24 | Arizona State | Parker Stadium; Corvallis, OR | L 21–30 | 20,595 | |
| October 31 | at Washington | Husky Stadium; Seattle, WA | L 12–28 | 66,392 | |
| November 7 | No. 7 UCLA | Parker Stadium; Corvallis, OR | L 17–52 | 20,104 | |
| November 14 | Stanford | Parker Stadium; Corvallis, OR | L 7–38 | 15,751 | |
| November 21 | at Oregon | Autzen Stadium; Eugene, OR (Civil War) | L 0–44 | 43,157 | |
*Non-conference game; Rankings from AP Poll released prior to the game

== Roster ==
- Robb Thomas (offense)
- Mike Dupree. (defense) /dnp
