= Hamilcar Rashed Jr. =

American football player (born 1998)

Profile
- Position: Defensive lineman

Personal information
- Born: January 2, 1998 (age 28); Phoenix, Arizona, U.S.
- Listed height: 6 ft 2 in (1.88 m)
- Listed weight: 251 lb (114 kg)

Career information
- High school: Chandler (Chandler, Arizona)
- College: Oregon State (2016–2020)
- NFL draft: 2021: undrafted

Career history
- New York Jets (2021); Pittsburgh Steelers (2022)*; Tampa Bay Buccaneers (2022–2023)*; Seattle Seahawks (2023)*; Calgary Stampeders (2024)
- * Offseason or practice squad member only

Awards and highlights
- Second-team All-Pac-12 (2019)

Career NFL statistics
- Total tackles: 1
- Stats at Pro Football Reference
- Stats at CFL.ca

Hamilcar Rashed Jr. (born January 2, 1998) is an American professional football defensive lineman. He played college football at Oregon State and in the NFL as a linebacker.

== Early life ==
Rashed Jr. originally attended Cesar Chavez High School in Phoenix, Arizona before transferring to Chandler High School in Chandler, Arizona for his senior season. He committed to Oregon State University to play college football.

== College career ==
After redshirting his first year at Oregon State in 2016, Rashed Jr. played in all 12 games in 2017, recording six tackles. As a sophomore in 2018, he started 10 of 12 games, recording 58 tackles and 2.5 sacks. As a junior in 2019, he started 11 of 12 games, finishing with 62 tackles and school records 14 sacks and 22.5 tackles for loss. The tackles for loss also led the nation. He was named a first-team All-American by Sports Illustrated, The Athletic and Phil Steele.

== Professional career ==
Pre-draft measurables
Height	Weight	Arm length	Hand span	40-yard dash	10-yard split	20-yard split	20-yard shuttle	Three-cone drill	Vertical jump	Broad jump	Bench press
6 ft 2 3/8 in (1.89 m)	251 lb (114 kg)	33 1/2 in (0.85 m)	10 in (0.25 m)	4.60 s	1.59 s	2.65 s	4.50 s	7.51 s	35.5 in (0.90 m)	10 ft 8 in (3.25 m)	25 reps
All values from Pro Day

=== New York Jets ===
On May 3, 2021, Rashed signed with the New York Jets as an undrafted free agent. He was waived on August 31, 2021 and re-signed to the practice squad the next day. He signed a reserve/future contract with the Jets on January 10, 2022. On August 8, 2022, Rashed was waived.

=== Pittsburgh Steelers ===
On August 10, 2022, Rashed was claimed off waivers by the Pittsburgh Steelers. He was waived on August 30 and signed to the practice squad the next day. He was released on November 15, 2022.

=== Tampa Bay Buccaneers ===
On December 14, 2022, Rashed was signed to the Tampa Bay Buccaneers practice squad. He signed a reserve/future contract on January 17, 2023. He was waived on August 28, 2023.

=== Seattle Seahawks ===
On December 15, 2023, Rashed was signed to the Seattle Seahawks practice squad. He was not signed to a reserve/future contract after the season and thus became a free agent upon the expiration of his practice squad contract.

=== Calgary Stampeders ===
Rashed signed with the Calgary Stampeders of the Canadian Football League on May 20, 2024. On June 2, he was moved to the practice roster prior to the start of the regular season. He was later promoted to the active roster on July 21, 2024.
