= Trent Bray (American football) =

American football player and coach (born 1982)

Current position
- Title: Defensive coordinator
- Team: Washington State
- Conference: Pac-12

Biographical details
- Born: September 28, 1982 (age 44); Flagstaff, Arizona, U.S.
- Education: Pullman (WA)

Playing career
- 2002–2005: Oregon State
- 2007: Hamburg Sea Devils
- Position: Linebacker

Coaching career (HC unless noted)
- 2008: Arizona State (GA)
- 2009: California Redwoods (LB)
- 2010–2011: Arizona State (LB)
- 2012–2014: Oregon State (GA/LB)
- 2015–2017: Nebraska (LB)
- 2018–2021: Oregon State (LB)
- 2022–2023: Oregon State (DC/LB)
- 2024–2025: Oregon State
- 2026–present: Washington State (DC/LB)

Head coaching record
- Overall: 5–14

Accomplishments and honors

Awards
- First-team All-Pac-10 (2005); Second-team All-Pac-10 (2004)

Trenton James Bray (born September 28, 1982) is an American football coach who is the defensive coordinator at Washington State University. He was the head football coach at Oregon State University from 2024 to 2025. He previously served as the defensive coordinator and linebackers coach at Oregon State from 2022 to 2023.

Bray played college football at Oregon State University from 2002 to 2005. Prior to his tenure at Oregon State University, Bray previously served as an assistant coach at the University of Nebraska–Lincoln and Arizona State University.

== Playing career ==
Bray was a standout linebacker for the Oregon State Beavers from 2002 to 2005, starting 34 of 49 career games. As a junior in 2004, he collected 122 tackles and was named Second-Team All-Pac-10. He also earned Insight Bowl Defensive MVP honors by making an Oregon State-bowl record 10 tackles in a victory over Notre Dame. He was selected a co-captain of the Beaver football team as a senior, and he backed it up with another terrific season, recording 116 tackles and earning First-Team All-Pac-10 honors. Bray finished his collegiate career with 337 tackles, the sixth-highest total in Oregon State history, 29.0 tackles for loss and 10.5 sacks while making 33 consecutive starts over his final three seasons in Corvallis.

== Coaching career ==
=== Assistant coach ===
==== Arizona State ====
In 2008, Bray began his coaching career as a graduate assistant at Arizona State University under head coach Dennis Erickson.

==== California Redwoods ====
In 2009, Bray served as the linebackers coach for the California Redwoods of the United Football League (UFL).

==== Arizona State (second stint) ====
In 2010, Bray returned to Arizona State University as their linebackers coach under head coach Dennis Erickson.

==== Oregon State ====
In 2012, Bray was hired as a graduate assistant and linebackers coach at Oregon State University under head coach Mike Riley.

==== Nebraska ====
In 2015, Bray was hired as the linebackers coach at the University of Nebraska–Lincoln, following head coach Mike Riley. On November 25, 2017, Bray was named interim head coach following the firing of Riley. He was relieved of interim duties at Nebraska after the school hired Scott Frost as head coach on December 2, 2017.

==== Oregon State (second stint) ====
In 2018, Bray was hired as the linebackers coach at Oregon State University under head coach Jonathan Smith. Midway through the 2021 season, Bray was promoted to interim defensive coordinator after the firing of Tim Tibesar. The interim title was removed after the regular season and Bray was promoted to defensive coordinator and linebacker coach in 2022.

=== Oregon State ===
On November 28, 2023, Bray was named the head coach at Oregon State University, replacing Jonathan Smith, who left to become the head coach of Michigan State. Oregon State fired Bray on October 12, 2025, following an 0–7 start to the season.

== Head coaching record ==
=== College ===
Year	Team	Overall	Conference	Standing	Bowl/playoffs
Oregon State (Pac-12 Conference) (2024–2025)
2024	Oregon State	5–7	1–0	1st	
2025	Oregon State	0–7 (Note: Oregon State fired Bray with five games remaining)	0–0		
Oregon State:		5–14	1–0		
Total:		5–14			
