= 2015 Oregon State Beavers football team =

American college football season

2015 Oregon State Beavers football
- Conference: Pac-12 Conference
- North Division
- Record: 2–10 (0–9 Pac-12)
- Head coach: Gary Andersen (1st season)
- Offensive coordinator: Dave Baldwin (1st season)
- Offensive scheme: Spread
- Defensive coordinator: Kalani Sitake (1st season)
- Base defense: 4–3
- Home stadium: Reser Stadium

2015 Pac-12 Conference football standings
	Conf.			Overall
Team	W		L	W		L
North Division
No. 3 Stanford xy$	8	–	1	12	–	2
No. 19 Oregon	7	–	2	9	–	4
Washington State	6	–	3	9	–	4
California	4	–	5	8	–	5
Washington	4	–	5	7	–	6
Oregon State	0	–	9	2	–	10
South Division
USC xy	6	–	3	8	–	6
No. 17 Utah x	6	–	3	10	–	3
UCLA	5	–	4	8	–	5
Arizona State	4	–	5	6	–	7
Arizona	3	–	6	7	–	6
Colorado	1	–	8	4	–	9
Championship: Stanford 41, USC 22
$ – Conference champion; x – Division champion/co-champions; y – Championship game participant; Rankings from AP Poll

The 2015 Oregon State Beavers football team represented Oregon State University during the 2015 NCAA Division I FBS football season. The team was led by first-year head coach Gary Andersen and played their home games at Reser Stadium in Corvallis. Oregon State was a member of the North Division of the Pac-12 Conference.

== Offseason ==
=== Coaching change ===
For the first time since the 2003 offseason, Oregon State underwent a coaching change.

==== Riley exits ====
In a move that shook the college football world, the University of Nebraska–Lincoln announced the hiring of Oregon State's head coach Mike Riley on December 4, 2014. Riley had what was dubbed a "lifetime contract" at Oregon State, where every year he led a team to a bowl game, his contract was extended by one year. In 2010, Oregon State Athletic Director Bob De Carolis said Riley had talked about wanting to retire in Corvallis and be the "Joe Paterno of Oregon State." In the same time period, Riley said, "I want to make it known that I'm very excited to be to coaching at Oregon State University and I anticipate doing so for a long time." Nebraska fired head coach Bo Pelini, opening the door for Riley to make the unanticipated move.

==== Welcoming Andersen ====
An equally shocking move came just six days later, as the Oregon State Athletic Department announced that they had hired Gary Andersen of Wisconsin as Riley's replacement on December 10, 2014. Andersen left Wisconsin after just two years with the program, citing high academic standards set by the university made recruiting difficult for Andersen, compiling a 19–7 overall record and coming off of a trip to the Big Ten Football Championship Game. Since Andersen left after just two seasons, a reported $3 million buyout was in effect. The coaching announcement came moments after the university announced $42 million upgrades to its football operations building, known as the Valley Football Center. It marked the second straight Wisconsin coach (Bret Bielema left for Arkansas) to leave for what many considered a job with a less prestigious program. Andersen was announced in a press conference on December 12, 2014.

== Schedule ==
Date	Time	Opponent	Site	TV	Result	Attendance
September 4	5:00 p.m.	Weber State*	Reser Stadium; Corvallis, OR	P12N	W 26–7	35,160
September 12	9:00 a.m.	at Michigan*	Michigan Stadium; Ann Arbor, MI	ABC	L 7–35	109,651
September 19	5:00 p.m.	San Jose State*	Reser Stadium; Corvallis, OR	P12N	W 35–21	34,573
September 25	7:00 p.m.	No. 21 Stanford	Reser Stadium; Corvallis, OR	FS1	L 24–42	37,302
October 10	1:00 p.m.	at Arizona	Arizona Stadium; Tucson, AZ	FS1	L 7–44	52,987
October 17	1:00 p.m.	at Washington State	Martin Stadium; Pullman, WA	P12N	L 31–52	32,952
October 24	7:30 p.m.	Colorado^{†}	Reser Stadium; Corvallis, OR	P12N	L 13–17	36,977
October 31	4:00 p.m.	at No. 13 Utah	Rice-Eccles Stadium; Salt Lake City, UT	P12N	L 12–27	45,853
November 7	1:30 p.m.	No. 22 UCLA	Reser Stadium; Corvallis, OR	P12N	L 0–41	38,074
November 14	7:30 p.m.	at California	California Memorial Stadium; Berkeley, CA	P12N	L 24–54	41,874
November 21	1:00 p.m.	Washington	Reser Stadium; Corvallis, OR	P12N	L 7–52	34,390
November 27	1:00 p.m.	at Oregon	Autzen Stadium; Eugene, OR (Civil War)	FS1	L 42–52	57,814
*Non-conference game; ^{†}Homecoming; Rankings from AP Poll released prior to the game; All times are in Pacific time

== Game summaries ==
=== Weber State ===
	1	2	3	4	Total
Wildcats	0	0	7	0	7
Beavers	0	6	7	13	26

=== Michigan ===
	1	2	3	4	Total
Beavers	7	0	0	0	7
Wolverines	3	14	3	15	35

=== San Jose State ===
	1	2	3	4	Total
Spartans	7	14	0	0	21
Beavers	7	7	21	0	35

=== Stanford ===
	1	2	3	4	Total
#21 Cardinal	14	7	14	7	42
Beavers	7	10	0	7	24

=== Arizona ===
	1	2	3	4	Total
Beavers	0	7	0	0	7
Wildcats	13	21	10	0	44

=== Washington State ===
	1	2	3	4	Total
Beavers	3	14	0	14	31
Cougars	14	31	0	7	52

=== Colorado ===
	1	2	3	4	Total
Buffaloes	3	7	0	7	17
Beavers	7	3	0	3	13

=== Utah ===
	1	2	3	4	Total
Beavers	0	6	0	6	12
#13 Utes	14	0	0	13	27

=== UCLA ===
	1	2	3	4	Total
#22 Bruins	0	24	17	0	41
Beavers	0	0	0	0	0

Referee for the game is Michael Batlan.

=== California ===
	1	2	3	4	Total
Beavers	0	10	14	0	24
Golden Bears	7	17	20	10	54

=== Washington ===
	1	2	3	4	Total
Huskies	28	17	7	0	52
Beavers	0	0	7	0	7

=== Oregon ===
	1	2	3	4	Total
Beavers	7	0	14	21	42
#17 Ducks	14	17	7	14	52
