= 1968 Denver Broncos season =

American football team season

- Owner: Gerald Phipps
- General manager: Lou Saban
- Head coach: Lou Saban
- Home stadium: Mile High Stadium

Results
- Record: 5–9
- Division place: 4th AFL Western
- Playoffs: Did not qualify

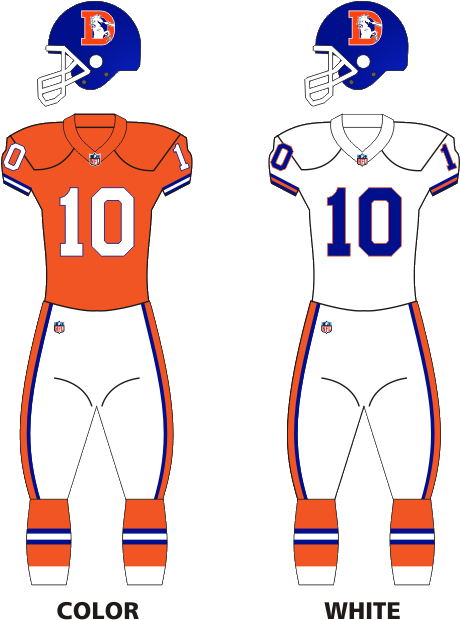
Uniforms worn by the NFL franchise Denver Broncos from 1968 to 1996.

The 1968 Denver Broncos season was the ninth season for the team in the American Football League (AFL). Led by second-year head coach and general manager Lou Saban, the Broncos improved their record from the previous season by posting a record of five wins and nine losses. They finished fourth in the AFL's Western division for the sixth straight season; the expansion Cincinnati Bengals finished fifth, allowing Denver to escape the cellar.

There were threats of the Broncos relocating to Atlanta, Chicago, and Birmingham, Alabama.

The 1968 season was the first in which Denver wore blue helmets with the trademark orange "D" logo; the helmets remained the same until the 1997 season.

In 1968, Bears Stadium was sold to the city of Denver, which renamed it "Mile High Stadium" and built the upper deck along the west side, raising capacity to 50,657.

== Offseason ==
=== NFL/AFL draft ===
1968 Denver Broncos draft
Round	Pick	Player	Position	College	Notes
2	31	Curley Culp * ^{†}	Defensive tackle	Arizona State	
3	58	Garrett Ford	Running back	West Virginia	
3	75	Bob Vaughn	Tackle	Ole Miss	
4	91	Gordon Lambert	Linebacker	Tennessee-Martins	
4	102	Drake Garrett	Defensive back	Michigan State	
4	111	Gus Hollomon	Defensive back	Houston	
8	196	Steve Holloway	Defensive back	Weber State	
9	222	Paul Smith *	Defensive end	New Mexico	
10	252	Bob Langford	Tackle	Middle Tennessee	
12	304	Bobby Hendrix	Tackle	Ole Miss	
13	330	Charlie Greer	Defensive back	Colorado	
14	357	Marlin Briscoe *	Quarterback	Nebraska-Omaha	
15	386	Jeff Kuhman	Linebacker	Vermont	
16	412	Adin Brown	Linebacker	William & Mary	
17	438	Steve Grady	Running back	USC	
Made roster † Pro Football Hall of Fame * Made at least one Pro Bowl during career

=== Undrafted free agents ===
1968 undrafted free agents of note
Player	Position	College
Ray Calcagno	Quarterback	Santa Clara
Ray Tomberlin	Linebacker	North Dakota

== Personnel ==
=== Staff / Coaches ===
1968 Denver Broncos staff
Front office: Team Owner / Chairman of the Board – Gerald Phipps; Team President – Allan R Phipps; Director of Player Personnel – Fred Gehrke; Head coaches: General Manager/Head Coach – Lou Saban; Offensive coaches: Offensive backfield – Hunter Enis; Offensive receivers – Sam Rutigliano; Offensive line – Whitey Dovell	Defensive coaches: Defensive line – Stan Jones; Defensive backfield – Dick MacPherson; Special teams coaches: N/A - Vacant; Strength and conditioning: N/A - Vacant

=== Roster ===
1968 Denver Broncos roster
Quarterbacks (QB): 15 Marlin Briscoe; 13 Steve Tensi; Running backs (RB): 46 Terry Erwin; 32 Garrett Ford; 44 Floyd Little; 33 Hub Lindsey; 22 Fran Lynch; 40 Brendan McCarthy; 48 Alex Moore; Wide receivers (WR): 41 Eric Crabtree; 88 Al Denson; 80 Jimmy Jones; 84 Mike Haffner; 42 Billy Van Heusen P; Tight ends (TE): 85 Tom Beer; 86 Bob Moten	Offensive linemen (OL): 65 Jay Bachman C; 72 Sam Brunelli T; 74 Mike Current T; 71 Wallace Dickey T; 64 George Gaiser G; 67 George Goeddeke G; 56 Wally Highsmith C/G; 59 Larry Kaminski C; 60 Bob Young G; Defensive linemen (DL): 63 Dave Costa DT; 77 Larry Cox DE; 55 Pete Duranko DE; 62 Jerry Inman DT; 87 Rich Jackson DE; 75 Rex Mirich DT; 70 Paul Smith DE	Linebackers (LB): 50 Carl Cunningham OLB; 52 Fred Forsberg OLB; 57 John Huard MLB; 76 Gordon Lambert OLB; 89 Chip Myrtle OLB; 58 Frank Richter OLB; Defensive backs (DB): 23 Drake Garrett CB; 20 Charlie Greer CB; 34 Gus Hollomon SS; 43 Pete Jaquess SS; 28 Jack Lentz FS; 25 Tommy Luke FS; 27 Tom Oberg FS; 21 Jesse Stokes CB; Special teams (ST): 12 Joe DiVito P; 3 Bobby Howfield K	Practice squad: None - Vacant; Reserve: 61 Bob Vaughn G (IR); Rookies in italics 48 active, 1 reserve, 0 practice squad

== Regular season ==
=== Schedule ===
Week	Date	Opponent	Result	Record	Venue	Attendance	Recap
1	Bye						
2	September 15	at **Cincinnati Bengals**	**L** 10–24	0–1	Nippert Stadium	25,049	Recap
3	September 22	at **Kansas City Chiefs**	**L** 2–34	0–2	Municipal Stadium	45,821	Recap
4	September 29	Boston Patriots	**L** 17–20	0–3	Mile High Stadium	37,024	Recap
5	October 6	**Cincinnati Bengals**	**W** 10–7	1–3	Mile High Stadium	41,257	Recap
6	October 13	at New York Jets	**W** 21–13	2–3	Shea Stadium	62,052	Recap
7	October 20	at **San Diego Chargers**	**L** 24–55	2–4	San Diego Stadium	42,953	Recap
8	October 27	Miami Dolphins	**W** 21–14	3–4	Mile High Stadium	44,115	Recap
9	November 3	at Boston Patriots	**W** 35–14	4–4	Fenway Park	18,304	Recap
10	November 10	**Oakland Raiders**	**L** 7–43	4–5	Mile High Stadium	50,002	Recap
11	November 17	at Houston Oilers	**L** 17–38	4–6	Astrodome	36,075	Recap
12	November 24	Buffalo Bills	**W** 34–32	5–6	Mile High Stadium	35,201	Recap
13	December 1	**San Diego Chargers**	**L** 23–47	5–7	Mile High Stadium	35,212	Recap
14	December 8	at **Oakland Raiders**	**L** 27–33	5–8	Oakland–Alameda County Coliseum	47,754	Recap
15	December 14	**Kansas City Chiefs**	**L** 7–30	5–9	Mile High Stadium	38,463	Recap
Note: Intra-division opponents are in **bold** text.

=== Standings ===
AFL Western Division
	W	L	T	PCT	DIV	PF	PA	STK
Oakland Raiders	12	2	0	.857	6–2	453	233	W8
Kansas City Chiefs	12	2	0	.857	7–1	371	170	W5
San Diego Chargers	9	5	0	.643	5–3	382	310	L2
Denver Broncos	5	9	0	.357	1–7	275	404	L3
Cincinnati Bengals	3	11	0	.214	1–7	215	329	L3

Note: Tie games were not officially counted in the standings in the AFL.
