= List of Oregon State Beavers in the NFL draft =

This is a list of Oregon State Beavers football players in the NFL draft.

== Key ==
B	Back	K	Kicker	NT	Nose tackle
C	Center	LB	Linebacker	FB	Fullback
DB	Defensive back	P	Punter	HB	Halfback
DE	Defensive end	QB	Quarterback	WR	Wide receiver
DT	Defensive tackle	RB	Running back	G	Guard
E	End	T	Offensive tackle	TE	Tight end

== Selections ==
Year	Round	Pick	Player	Team	Position
1938	1	10	Joe Gray	Chicago Bears	B
1938	7	60	Frank Ramsey	Chicago Bears	G
1938	9	72	Elmer Kolberg	Philadelphia Eagles	B
1939	6	47	Joe Wendlick	Detroit Lions	E
1939	13	117	Prescott Hutchins	Detroit Lions	G
1940	4	28	Elbie Schultz	Philadelphia Eagles	G
1940	16	145	Morris Kohler	Cleveland Rams	B
1940	17	156	Johnny Hackenbruck	Detroit Lions	T
1941	5	33	Vic Sears	Pittsburgh Steelers	T
1941	6	44	Jim Kisselburgh	Cleveland Rams	B
1941	8	67	Len Younce	New York Giants	G
1941	16	150	Ken Dow	Washington Redskins	B
1942	3	20	Bob Dethman	Detroit Lions	B
1942	8	63	Bill Halverson	Philadelphia Eagles	G
1942	8	66	George Peters	Washington Redskins	B
1943	5	31	Lloyd Wickett	Detroit Lions	T
1943	16	150	Joe Day	Washington Redskins	B
1943	23	217	George Bain	Pittsburgh Steelers	T
1943	24	228	George Zellick	Green Bay Packers	E
1944	14	138	Boyd Clement	Washington Redskins	C
1944	16	159	Lou Shelton	Green Bay Packers	B
1944	16	160	Ted Ossowski	Washington Redskins	T
1944	26	270	Lee Gustafson	Washington Redskins	B
1946	3	25	Don Samuel	Los Angeles Rams	B
1946	11	98	Bob Stevens	Detroit Lions	B
1946	13	115	Bob Reiman	New York Giants	B
1946	15	140	Dick Lorenz	Los Angeles Rams	E
1946	26	247	Roger Anderson	Detroit Lions	G
1947	6	43	Paul Evenson	Los Angeles Rams	T
1947	7	48	Bill Gray	Washington Redskins	C
1949	13	126	Bill Austin	New York Giants	T
1949	14	137	Ed Carmichael	Los Angeles Rams	T
1950	1	13	Ken Carpenter	Cleveland Browns	B
1950	14	172	Ed Carmichael	New York Bulldogs	G
1950	24	313	Tom DeSylvia	Philadelphia Eagles	G
1950	27	351	Dick Gray	Cleveland Browns	B
1951	13	155	John Thomas	Boston Yanks	E
1952	4	44	Herman Clark	Chicago Bears	T
1952	5	55	Jim Clark	Washington Redskins	G
1952	7	77	John Thomas	Philadelphia Eagles	E
1952	11	133	Sam Baker	Los Angeles Rams	B/K
1953	8	93	Doug Hogland	San Francisco 49ers	T
1954	7	74	Dave Mann	Chicago Cardinals	B
1954	12	145	Bob Hartman	Detroit Lions	T
1954	17	199	Joe Fulwyler	Pittsburgh Steelers	C
1955	9	103	John Witte	Los Angeles Rams	T
1955	10	117	Ron Aschbacker	San Francisco 49ers	E
1957	12	138	Vern Ellison	Pittsburgh Steelers	G
1957	30	359	Sam Wesley	Chicago Bears	B
1958	5	51	Joe Francis	Green Bay Packers	B
1959	4	46	Bob Grottkau	Detroit Lions	G
1959	5	52	Ted Bates	Chicago Cardinals	T
1961	4	47	Aaron Thomas	San Francisco 49ers	E
1961	7	86	Art Gilmore	Dallas Cowboys	B
1962	5	67	Henry Rivera	Cleveland Browns	RB
1962	16	222	Roger Johnson	New York Giants	RB
1962	17	230	Don Kasso	St. Louis Cardinals	RB
1963	1	1	Terry Baker	Los Angeles Rams	QB
1963	5	64	Vern Burke	San Francisco 49ers	E
1964	17	225	Ken Brusven	San Francisco 49ers	T
1965	6	74	Richard Koeper	Green Bay Packers	T
1965	16	215	Doug McDougal	Dallas Cowboys	E
1965	17	226	Len Frketich	San Francisco 49ers	E
1965	17	234	Steve Clark	Green Bay Packers	K
1966	11	164	Jack O'Billovich	Detroit Lions	LB
1966	15	217	Mike Sullivan	Los Angeles Rams	WR
1966	15	220	Mark Gartung	Dallas Cowboys	T
1967	2	28	Bob Grim	Minnesota Vikings	RB
1967	3	73	Rockne Freitas	Pittsburgh Steelers	C
1967	8	187	Scott Eaton	New York Giants	DB
1967	11	265	Pete Pifer	New York Giants	RB
1967	16	416	Paul Brothers	Dallas Cowboys	QB
1967	17	425	Wayne Valley	Denver Broncos	T
1968	3	69	Skip Vanderbundt	San Francisco 49ers	LB
1968	8	193	Harry Gunner	Cincinnati Bengals	LB
1968	9	236	Gary Houser	New York Jets	TE
1969	2	27	Bill Enyart	Buffalo Bills	RB
1969	3	67	Jon Sandstron	Atlanta Falcons	G
1969	7	173	John Didion	Washington Redskins	C
1969	9	216	Rocky Rasley	Detroit Lions	G
1969	9	229	Mike Foote	Los Angeles Rams	LB
1970	6	140	Mel Easley	New Orleans Saints	DB
1970	7	168	Bill Nelson	Los Angeles Rams	DT
1970	13	313	Billy Main	Pittsburgh Steelers	RB
1970	13	326	Jess Lewis	Houston Oilers	LB
1971	6	138	Craig Hanneman	Pittsburgh Steelers	T
1972	7	165	Clark Hoss	New England Patriots	TE
1972	10	247	Jack Turnbull	Chicago Bears	C
1972	10	256	Dave Shilling	Baltimore Colts	RB
1972	16	404	Steve Bielenberg	Philadelphia Eagles	LB
1973	7	161	Steve Brown	Los Angeles Rams	LB
1973	17	440	Mike Shannon	Pittsburgh Steelers	DT
1975	3	71	Jeff Hart	San Francisco 49ers	T
1975	11	278	Greg Krpalek	Dallas Cowboys	C
1975	11	282	Jerry Hackenbruck	Washington Redskins	DE
1975	15	385	Alvin White	Los Angeles Rams	QB
1976	4	95	Bob Horn	San Diego Chargers	LB
1976	14	384	Ron Cuie	Chicago Bears	RB
1977	3	58	Dennis Boyd	Seattle Seahawks	DE
1978	7	186	Greg Marshall	Philadelphia Eagles	DT
1979	4	108	Jerry Wilkinson	Los Angeles Rams	DT
1980	8	199	Tim Smith	Green Bay Packers	DB
1982	7	187	Victor Simmons	Detroit Lions	WR
1986	9	222	Reggie Bynum	Buffalo Bills	WR
1987	10	260	Paul Carberry	Philadelphia Eagles	DT
1988	7	178	Owen Howen	Dallas Cowboys	T
1989	3	83	Erik Wilhelm	Cincinnati Bengals	QB
1989	6	143	Robb Thomas	Kansas City Chiefs	WR
1989	11	300	Calvin Nicholson	New Orleans Saints	DB
1990	5	117	Pat Chaffey	Chicago Bears	RB
1990	9	231	Phil Ross	Miami Dolphins	TE
1991	2	35	Esera Tuaolo	Green Bay Packers	DT
1994	3	99	Alai Kalaniuvalu	Atlanta Falcons	G
1996	2	58	Reggie Tongue	Kansas City Chiefs	DB
1999	5	142	Bryan Jones	Miami Dolphins	LB
1999	6	194	Armon Hatcher	Buffalo Bills	DB
1999	7	217	Tim Alexander	Washington Redskins	WR
2001	2	36	Chad Johnson	Cincinnati Bengals	WR
2001	3	89	DeLawrence Grant	Oakland Raiders	DE
2001	6	185	Mitch White	New Orleans Saints	T
2001	7	204	T. J. Houshmandzadeh	Cincinnati Bengals	WR
2002	3	82	James Allen	New Orleans Saints	LB
2003	1	29	Nick Barnett	Green Bay Packers	LB
2003	4	98	Dennis Weathersby	Cincinnati Bengals	DB
2003	5	147	James Lee	Green Bay Packers	DT
2004	1	24	Steven Jackson	St. Louis Rams	RB
2004	2	51	Dwan Edwards	Baltimore Ravens	DT
2004	4	109	Tim Euhus	Buffalo Bills	TE
2004	4	127	Richard Seigler	San Francisco 49ers	LB
2005	6	184	Bill Swancutt	Detroit Lions	DE
2005	6	213	Derek Anderson	Baltimore Ravens	QB
2005	7	254	Doug Nienhuis	Seattle Seahawks	T
2006	6	171	Mike Hass	New Orleans Saints	WR
2006	6	178	Keith Ellison	Buffalo Bills	LB
2007	2	64	Sabby Piscitelli	Tampa Bay Buccaneers	DB
2007	6	189	Adam Koets	New York Giants	T
2008	5	157	Roy Schuening	St. Louis Rams	G
2008	7	243	Joey LaRocque	Chicago Bears	LB
2009	2	51	Andy Levitre	Buffalo Bills	G
2009	3	96	Keenan Lewis	Pittsburgh Steelers	DB
2009	4	110	Victor Butler	Dallas Cowboys	DE
2009	4	126	Slade Norris	Oakland Raiders	LB
2009	5	148	Brandon Hughes	San Diego Chargers	DB
2009	6	190	Al Afalava	Chicago Bears	DB
2009	7	233	Sammie Stroughter	Tampa Bay Buccaneers	WR
2010	7	239	Sean Canfield	New Orleans Saints	QB
2011	2	53	Stephen Paea	Chicago Bears	DT
2011	5	140	Gabe Miller	Kansas City Chiefs	LB
2011	5	145	Jacquizz Rodgers	Atlanta Falcons	RB
2012	3	79	Brandon Hardin	Chicago Bears	DB
2013	3	79	Markus Wheaton	Pittsburgh Steelers	WR
2013	7	218	Jordan Poyer	Philadelphia Eagles	DB
2014	1	20	Brandin Cooks	New Orleans Saints	WR
2014	3	72	Scott Crichton	Minnesota Vikings	DE
2015	3	89	Sean Mannion	St. Louis Rams	QB
2015	3	98	Steven Nelson	Kansas City Chiefs	DB
2015	5	172	D. J. Alexander	Kansas City Chiefs	LB
2015	6	209	Obum Gwacham	Seattle Seahawks	DE
2015	7	248	Ryan Murphy	Seattle Seahawks	DB
2016	3	79	Isaac Seumalo	Philadelphia Eagles	C
2017	4	136	Sean Harlow	Atlanta Falcons	G
2017	5	169	Treston Decoud	Houston Texans	DB
2020	6	189	Jake Luton	Jacksonville Jaguars	QB
2020	6	203	Blake Brandel	Minnesota Vikings	T
2020	6	207	Isaiah Hodgins	Buffalo Bills	WR
2021	3	99	Nahshon Wright	Dallas Cowboys	DB
2021	7	257	Jermar Jefferson	Detroit Lions	RB
2022	5	170	Teagan Quitoriano	Houston Texans	TE
2023	2	42	Luke Musgrave	Green Bay Packers	TE
2023	7	252	Alex Austin	Buffalo Bills	DB
2024	1	14	Taliese Fuaga	New Orleans Saints	T
2024	5	142	Anthony Gould	Indianapolis Colts	WR
2024	5	169	Kitan Oladapo	Green Bay Packers	DB
