= List of Oregon State Beavers bowl games =

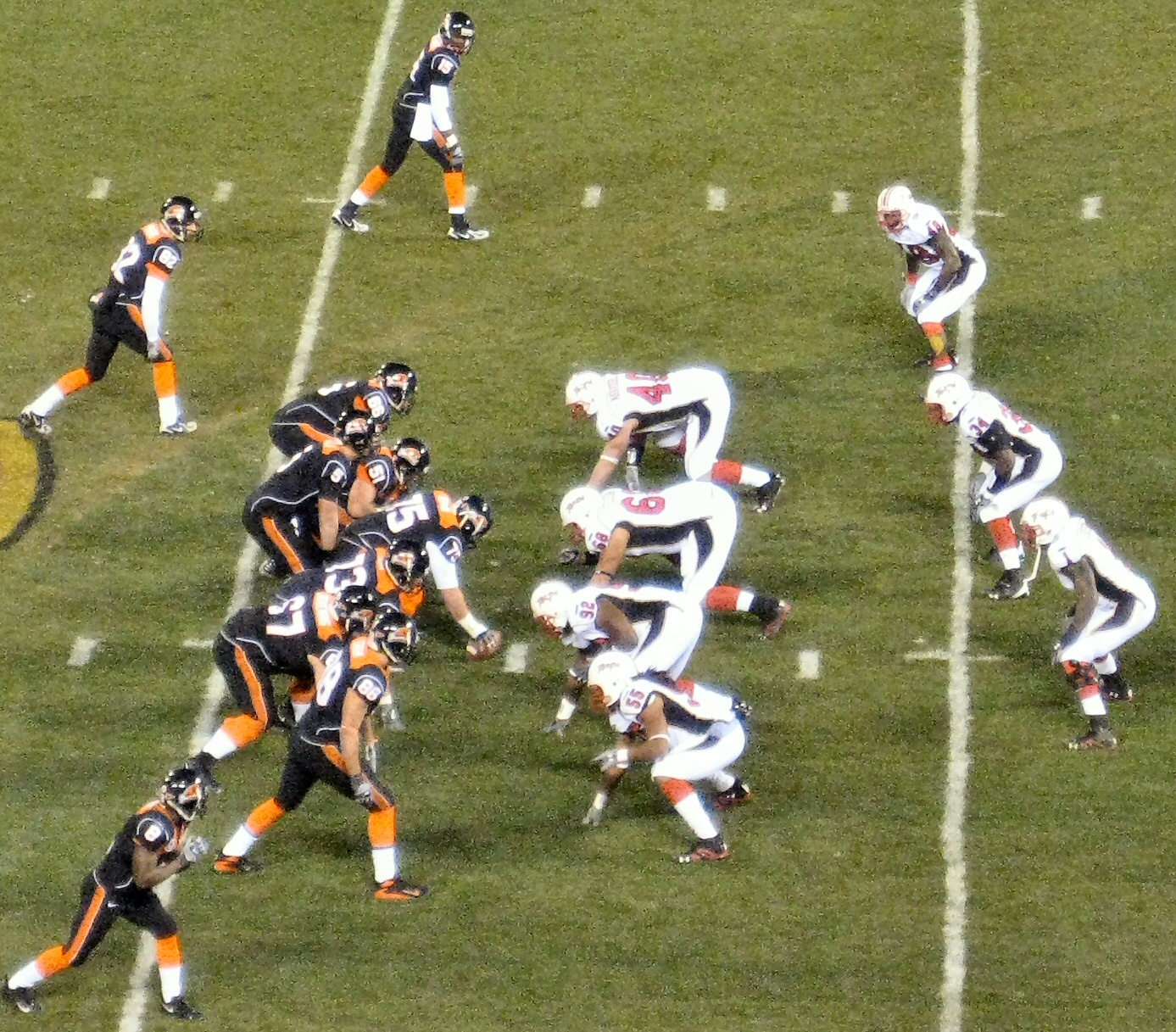
On offense during the 2007 Emerald Bowl

The Oregon State Beavers college football team competes as part of the NCAA Division I Football Bowl Subdivision (FBS), representing Oregon State University in the North Division of the Pac-12 Conference (Pac-12). Since the establishment of the team in 1893, Oregon State has appeared in 20 bowl games. (Note: The Pineapple Bowl was unsanctioned by the NCAA. As such, the two appearances in the game in 1940 and 1949 are not included in the NCAA bowl listing for Oregon State.) This includes three appearances in the Rose Bowl Game and one Bowl Championship Series (BCS) game appearance in the 2001 Fiesta Bowl. This does not include the 1960 Gotham Bowl which was canceled after bowl organizers could not find an opponent to compete against Oregon State who had already accepted the bid, or the 1980 Mirage Bowl, a regular season game.

== Key ==
Results
| W | Win |
| L | Loss |
| T | Tie |

== Bowl games ==
List of bowl games showing bowl played in, score, date, season, opponent, stadium, location, attendance and head coach (Note: Statistics correct as of 2019–20 NCAA football bowl games.)
| # | Bowl | Score (Note: Results are sortable first by whether the result was an Oregon State win, loss or tie and then second by the margin of victory.) | Date | Season (Note: Links to the season article for the Oregon State team that competed in the bowl for that year.) | Opponent (Note: Links to the season article for the opponent that Oregon State competed against in the bowl for that year when available or to their general page when unavailable.) | Stadium | Location | Attendance | Head coach |
|---|---|---|---|---|---|---|---|---|---|
| 1 | Pineapple Bowl | W 39–6 | January 1, 1940 | 1939 | Hawaii Rainbow Warriors | Honolulu Stadium | Honolulu | 15,000 | Lon Stiner |
| 2 | Rose Bowl (Note: Due to concerns following the December 7, 1941 attack on Pearl Harbor, the January 1, 1942, Rose Bowl was moved to Duke University's Duke Stadium in Durham, North Carolina, as officials were wary of allowing such a large crowd to congregate anywhere on the West Coast due to World War II security threats.) | W 20–16 | January 1, 1942 | 1941 | Duke Blue Devils | Duke Stadium | Durham | 56,000 | Lon Stiner |
| 3 | Pineapple Bowl | W 47–27 | January 1, 1949 | 1948 | Hawaii Rainbow Warriors | Honolulu Stadium | Honolulu | 15,000 | Lon Stiner |
| 4 | Rose Bowl | L 35–19 | January 1, 1957 | 1956 | Iowa Hawkeyes | Rose Bowl | Pasadena | 97,126 | Tommy Prothro |
| 5 | Liberty Bowl | W 6–0 | December 15, 1962 | 1962 | Villanova Wildcats | Philadelphia Municipal Stadium | Philadelphia | 17,048 | Tommy Prothro |
| 6 | Rose Bowl | L 34–7 | January 1, 1965 | 1964 | Michigan Wolverines | Rose Bowl | Pasadena | 100,423 | Tommy Prothro |
| 7 | Oahu Bowl | L 23–17 | December 25, 1999 | 1999 | Hawaii Rainbow Warriors | Aloha Stadium | Honolulu | 40,974 | Dennis Erickson |
| 8 | Fiesta Bowl | W 41–9 | January 1, 2001 | 2000 | Notre Dame Fighting Irish | Sun Devil Stadium | Tempe | 75,428 | Dennis Erickson |
| 9 | Insight Bowl | L 38–13 | December 26, 2002 | 2002 | Pittsburgh Panthers | Bank One Ballpark | Phoenix | 40,533 | Dennis Erickson |
| 10 | Las Vegas Bowl (Note: The Las Vegas Bowl has been known as the: Las Vegas Bowl (1992–1998, 2000, 2003); EA Sports Las Vegas Bowl (1999); Sega Sports Las Vegas Bowl (2001–2002), Pioneer PureVision Las Vegas Bowl (2004–2006); Pioneer Las Vegas Bowl (2007–2008); MAACO Bowl Las Vegas (2009–2012); Royal Purple Las Vegas Bowl (since 2013).) | W 55–14 | December 24, 2003 | 2003 | New Mexico Lobos | Sam Boyd Stadium | Las Vegas | 25,437 | Mike Riley |
| 11 | Insight Bowl | W 38–21 | December 28, 2004 | 2004 | Notre Dame Fighting Irish | Bank One Ballpark | Phoenix | 45,917 | Mike Riley |
| 12 | Sun Bowl | W 39–38 | December 28, 2006 | 2006 | Missouri Tigers | Sun Bowl | El Paso | 48,732 | Mike Riley |
| 13 | Emerald Bowl | W 21–14 | December 28, 2007 | 2007 | Maryland Terrapins | AT&T Park | San Francisco | 32,517 | Mike Riley |
| 14 | Sun Bowl | W 3–0 | December 31, 2008 | 2008 | Pittsburgh Panthers | Sun Bowl | El Paso | 49,037 | Mike Riley |
| 15 | Maaco Bowl Las Vegas | L 44–20 | December 22, 2009 | 2009 | BYU Cougars | Sam Boyd Stadium | Las Vegas | 40,018 | Mike Riley |
| 16 | Alamo Bowl | L 31–27 | December 29, 2012 | 2012 | Texas Longhorns | Alamodome | San Antonio | 65,277 | Mike Riley |
| 17 | Hawaii Bowl | W 38–23 | December 24, 2013 | 2013 | Boise State Broncos | Aloha Stadium | Honolulu | 29,106 | Mike Riley |
| 18 | LA Bowl | L 24–13 | December 18, 2021 | 2021 | Utah State Aggies | SoFi Stadium | Los Angeles | 29,898 | Jonathan Smith |
| 19 | Las Vegas Bowl | W 30–3 | December 17, 2022 | 2022 | Florida Gators | Allegiant Stadium | Las Vegas | 29,750 | Jonathan Smith |
| 20 | Sun Bowl | L 40–8 | December 29, 2023 | 2023 | Notre Dame Fighting Irish | Sun Bowl | El Paso | 48,223 | Kefense Hynson |
