= Lyle Moevao =

American football player and coach (born 1987)

Arizona Wildcats
- Title: Asst Runningbacks Coach

Personal information
- Born: January 17, 1987 (age 39); San Diego, California, U.S.
- Listed height: 5 ft 11 in (1.80 m)
- Listed weight: 220 lb (100 kg)

Career information
- High school: Torrance (CA) North
- College: Oregon State
- NFL draft: 2010: undrafted

Career history

Playing
- La Courneuve Flash (2011); Elecom Kobe Finies (2012)

Coaching
- Oregon State (QC - Running backs, 2013–2014); Oregon State (QC - Quarterbacks, 2015–2016); Lewis & Clark (QBs/Pass Game Coordinator, 2017–2018); San Antonio Commanders (Runningbacks, 2019); University of Northern Colorado (Runningbacks/Recruiting Coordinator, 2020); San Jose State University (Def Analyst, 2021); San Jose State University (Off Analyst - QBs, 2022–2023); Arizona (Quarterbacks, 2024); Arizona (Asst Running backs Coach, 2025-Present)

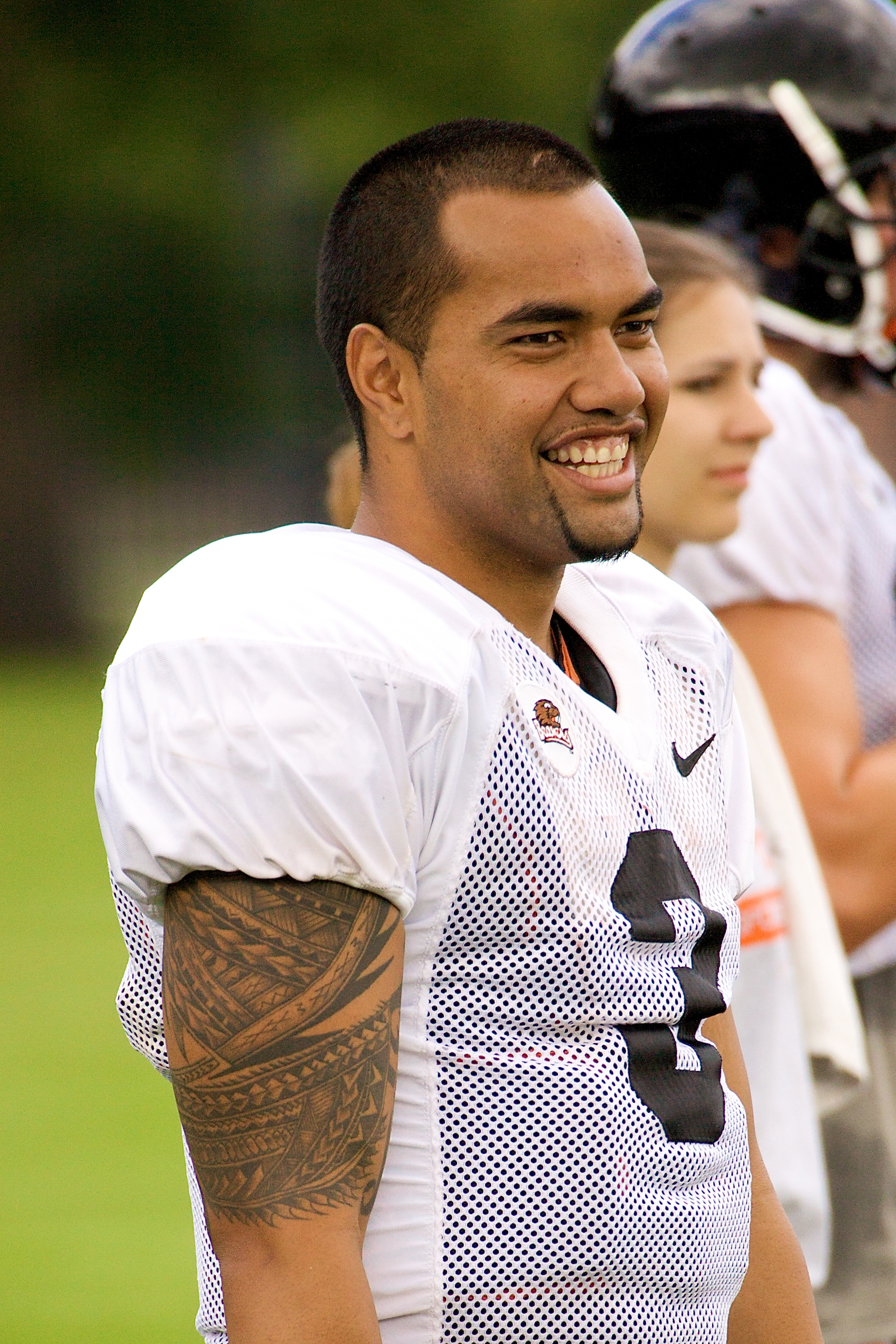

Lyle Moevao (born January 17, 1987) is a former professional and college football quarterback for the Oregon State Beavers football team. He played professionally in France for the La Courneuve Flash and Japan. Moevao was the starting quarterback for Oregon State for the 2008 season, throwing for 2,534 yards and 19 touchdowns with a quarterback rating of 128.41. He also helped the Beavers to a 3–0 victory in the 2008 Sun Bowl against the Pittsburgh Panthers.

He was recently the Defensive Analyst for San Jose State University. Previous coaching stops in include running backs coach for Northern Colorado University (2020), San Antonio Commanders-AAF (2019), quarterbacks coach at Lewis & Clark College (2017–2018), QC/GA at Oregon State University (2013–2016). He played professionally for two years in France (2011) and Japan (2012) top-level league after his college career.

== College career ==
Moevao attended Oregon State University, where he played for the Oregon State Beavers football team for four seasons (2006–2009). During his time at Oregon State, he continuously battled for playing time alongside Sean Canfield. Moevao earned three letters for the Beavers and finished his career as one of the most successful quarterbacks in OSU history going 11–4 as a starter. He finished his OSU career ranked in the top 10 in school history with 3,410 passing yards and 21 touchdowns. A pair of injuries ended his career after a single pass during his senior year following a Pac-10 Honorable Mention season as a junior.

== Professional career ==
=== La Courneuve Flash ===
In January 2011, Moevao was signed by the La Courneuve Flash of the Ligue Élite de Football Américain. In the French football championship on June 18, 2011, Moevao completed 12 of 17 passes for 190 yards and 2 touchdowns in leading La Courneuve Flash to a 45–27 win over the Grenoble Centaures before a crowd of 7,000. Moevao was selected as Most Valuable Player of the game.

== Coaching career ==
In April 2013, Moevao returned to Oregon State as an associate student intern, working with the running backs and quarterbacks. In 2015–16, he was an offensive quality control assistant.

On February 8, 2017, Moevao was hired as Lewis & Clark's quarterbacks coach.

On November 14, 2018, Moevao became the quarterbacks coach for his former college head coach Mike Riley and the San Antonio Commanders of the Alliance of American Football. Soon after being hired, he was switched to be the running backs coach.

February 2020, Moevao was hired as University of Northern Colorado Running back coach/recruiting coordinator.

June 2021, Moevao was hired as San Jose State University's defensive analyst.

January 2022–23, Moevao switched over to Offense as Quarterbacks - Analyst @ San Jose State University's.

January 2024, Moevao was hired as Arizona University's Quarterbacks Coach.

March 2025, Moevao was switched to Assistant Runningbacks Coach at Arizona University.
