= 2008 Oregon State Beavers football team =

American college football season

2008 Oregon State Beavers football

Sun Bowl champion

Sun Bowl, W 3–0 vs. Pittsburgh
- Conference: Pacific-10 Conference

Ranking
- Coaches: No. 19
- AP: No. 18
- Record: 9–4 (7–2 Pac-10)
- Head coach: Mike Riley (8th season)
- Offensive coordinator: Danny Langsdorf (4th season)
- Offensive scheme: Multiple
- Defensive coordinator: Mark Banker (6th season)
- Base defense: 4–3
- Captains: Victor Butler; Brandon Hughes; Andy Levitre; Sammie Stroughter
- Home stadium: Reser Stadium

2008 Pacific-10 Conference football standings
	Conf.			Overall
Team	W		L	W		L
No. 3 USC $	8	–	1	12	–	1
No. 10 Oregon	7	–	2	10	–	3
No. 18 Oregon State	7	–	2	9	–	4
California	6	–	3	9	–	4
Arizona	5	–	4	8	–	5
Arizona State	4	–	5	5	–	7
Stanford	4	–	5	5	–	7
UCLA	3	–	6	4	–	8
Washington State	1	–	8	2	–	11
Washington	0	–	9	0	–	12
$ – Conference champion; Rankings from AP Poll

The 2008 Oregon State Beavers football team represented Oregon State University as a member of the Pacific-10 Conference (Pac-10) during the 2008 NCAA Division I FBS football season. Led by eighth-year head coach Mike Riley, the Beavers compiled an overall record of 9–4 with a mark of 7–2 in conference play, tying for second place in the Pac-10. Oregon State was invited to the Sun Bowl, where the Beavers defeated Pittsburgh. For the third straight season, Oregon State won at least nine games and finished in the top three in the Pac-10 standings. The team played home games Reser Stadium in Corvallis, Oregon.

== Schedule ==
Date	Time	Opponent	Rank	Site	TV	Result	Attendance
August 28	6:00 pm	at Stanford		Stanford Stadium; Stanford, CA	ESPN2	L 28–36	30,223
September 6	12:30 pm	at No. 19 Penn State*		Beaver Stadium; University Park, PA	ABC/ESPN2	L 14–45	108,159
September 13	1:00 pm	Hawaii*		Reser Stadium; Corvallis, OR	FSNNW	W 45–7	45,059
September 25	6:00 pm	No. 1 USC		Reser Stadium; Corvallis, OR	ESPN	W 27–21	42,839
October 2	6:00 pm	at No. 15 Utah*		Rice–Eccles Stadium; Salt Lake City, UT	Versus	L 28–31	45,599
October 11	3:30 pm	Washington State		Reser Stadium; Corvallis, OR	FSNNW	W 66–13	45,289
October 18	4:00 pm	at Washington		Husky Stadium; Seattle, WA	Versus	W 34–13	63,996
November 1	7:15 pm	Arizona State^{†}		Reser Stadium; Corvallis, OR	FSN	W 27–25	44,109
November 8	3:00 pm	at UCLA		Rose Bowl; Pasadena, CA	FSNNW	W 34–6	83,478
November 15	12:30 pm	California	No. 23	Reser Stadium; Corvallis, OR	ABC	W 34–21	45,969
November 22	4:00 pm	at Arizona	No. 21	Arizona Stadium; Tucson, AZ	Versus	W 19–17	48,503
November 29	4:00 pm	No. 19 Oregon	No. 17	Reser Stadium; Corvallis, OR (Civil War)	Versus	L 38–65	46,319
December 31	11:00 am	vs. No. 18 Pittsburgh*	No. 24	Sun Bowl; El Paso, TX (Sun Bowl)	CBS	W 3–0	49,037
*Non-conference game; ^{†}Homecoming; Rankings from AP Poll released prior to the game; All times are in Pacific time

== Game summaries ==
=== At Stanford ===
	1	2	3	4	Total
Beavers	0	17	3	8	28
Cardinal	0	17	5	14	36

Statistics	ORST	STAN
First downs	29	18
Total yards	490	301
Rushing yards	86	210
Passing yards	404	91
Turnovers	3	0
Time of possession	28:46	31:14

Team	Category	Player	Statistics
Oregon State	Passing	Lyle Moevao	34/54, 404 yards, 3 TD, 2 INT
Oregon State	Rushing	Jacquizz Rodgers	14 rushes, 54 yards
Oregon State	Receiving	Sammie Stroughter	12 receptions, 157 yards, 2 TD
Stanford	Passing	Tavi Pritchard	10/17, 91 yards, TD
Stanford	Rushing	Toby Gerhart	19 rushes, 147 yards, 2 TD
Stanford	Receiving	Ryan Whalen	3 receptions, 30 yards

Oregon State was almost able to come back late in the fourth quarter when Darrell Catchings caught the ball just outside the end zone, but it was knocked loose by Taylor Skaufel, resulting in a touchback and victory for the Cardinal.

=== At No. 19 Penn State ===
	1	2	3	4	Total
Beavers	0	7	0	7	14
No. 19 Nittany Lions	14	21	10	0	45

Statistics	ORST	PSU
First downs	19	23
Total yards	342	454
Rushing yards	92	239
Passing yards	250	215
Turnovers	2	1
Time of possession	32:29	27:31

Team	Category	Player	Statistics
Oregon State	Passing	Lyle Moevao	25/41, 250 yards, 2 INT
Oregon State	Rushing	Jacquizz Rodgers	22 rushes, 99 yards, 2 TD
Oregon State	Receiving	Sammie Stroughter	4 receptions, 56 yards
Penn State	Passing	Daryll Clark	14/23, 215 yards, 2 TD
Penn State	Rushing	Evan Royster	17 rushes, 141 yards, 3 TD
Penn State	Receiving	Jordan Norwood	8 receptions, 116 yards, TD

Despite the off-field distractions, the Nittany Lions rolled to a 35-7 halftime lead en route to a 45-14 win in their first-ever meeting with the Beavers. Penn State's sophomore tailback Evan Royster ran for a career-high 141 yards on 17 carries and three touchdowns. Lion quarterback Daryll Clark's 276 total yards of offense (215 yards passing, 61 yards rushing) helped Penn State total 454 yards of offense.

Penn State linebackers Tyrell Sales and NaVorro Bowman both recorded 10 tackles each, both career-highs and linebacker Josh Hull and safety Mark Rubin both made their first career interceptions. 108,159 were in attendance at Happy Valley for this first-ever meeting between the schools.

=== Hawaii ===
	1	2	3	4	Total
Warriors	7	0	0	0	7
Beavers	7	14	17	7	45

Statistics	HAW	ORST
First downs	14	28
Total yards	211	485
Rushing yards	57	217
Passing yards	154	268
Turnovers	3	0
Time of possession	22:33	37:27

Team	Category	Player	Statistics
Hawaii	Passing	Tyler Graunke	12/27, 118 yards, 2 INT
Hawaii	Rushing	Kealoha Pilares	8 rushes, 36 yards, TD
Hawaii	Receiving	Michael Washington	7 receptions, 71 yards
Oregon State	Passing	Lyle Moevao	20/34, 268 yards, 3 TD
Oregon State	Rushing	Jacquizz Rodgers	26 rushes, 110 yards, 2 TD
Oregon State	Receiving	Shane Morales	5 receptions, 93 yards, TD

Oregon State scored 45 unanswered points ien route to their first victory of the season. It was the second time in 3 years that Oregon State has defeated Hawaii.

=== No. 1 USC ===
	1	2	3	4	Total
No. 1 Trojans	0	0	14	7	21
Beavers	7	14	0	6	27

Statistics	USC	ORST
First downs	16	22
Total yards	313	343
Rushing yards	86	176
Passing yards	227	167
Turnovers	2	0
Time of possession	22:11	37:49

Team	Category	Player	Statistics
USC	Passing	Mark Sanchez	18/29, 227 yards, 3 TD, INT
USC	Rushing	Stafon Johnson	7 rushes, 48 yards
USC	Receiving	Damian Williams	6 receptions, 94 yards, TD
Oregon State	Passing	Lyle Moevao	18/28, 167 yards, 2 TD
Oregon State	Rushing	Jacquizz Rodgers	37 rushes, 186 yards, 2 TD
Oregon State	Receiving	Sammie Stroughter	3 receptions, 42 yards

The Beavers shocked the college football world as they upset the No. 1 Ranked USC Trojans at home on September 25, 2008. Oregon State is one of two Pac-10 Conference school to have beaten USC twice during the Pete Carroll era.

Freshman Jacquizz Rodgers ran for 186 yards and two touchdowns for OSU, USC quarterback Mark Sanchez passed for 227 yards, and Damian Williams caught 80 yards for the Trojans.

This was the last time an unranked team defeated a AP No. 1 team until 2021, where unranked Texas A&M upset AP No. 1 Alabama 41–38.

=== At No. 15 Utah ===
	1	2	3	4	Total
Beavers	3	12	6	7	28
Utes	3	17	0	11	31

Statistics	ORST	UTAH
First downs	20	18
Total yards	405	337
Rushing yards	92	136
Passing yards	313	201
Turnovers	1	2
Time of possession	31:06	28:54

Team	Category	Player	Statistics
Oregon State	Passing	Lyle Moevao	21/31, 313 yards, 2 TD
Oregon State	Rushing	Jacquizz Rodgers	25 rushes, 101 yards, TD
Oregon State	Receiving	James Rodgers	5 receptions, 82 yards
Utah	Passing	Brian Johnson	17/30, 201 yards, 2 TD, INT
Utah	Rushing	Matt Asiata	7 rushes, 53 yards
Utah	Receiving	Brent Casteel	5 receptions, 105 yards

After five games, the pattern for the 2008 Beavers has been the home team wins. The Beavers led 28-20 with about 2 minutes remaining in the fourth. They let Utah drive all the way down the field and score along with a 2-point conversion to tie it up. The Beavers gave the ball right back to Utah and place kicker Louie Sakoda nailed a 37-yard field goal as time expired. Sophomore kicker Justin Kahut of Oregon State missed an extra point in the early stages of the game which led Mike Riley to go for the two-point conversion after two of the Beaver's touchdowns. Both failed and it cost the Beavers the game.

=== Washington State ===
	1	2	3	4	Total
Cougars	0	13	0	0	13
Beavers	21	3	21	21	66

Statistics	WSU	ORST
First downs	8	26
Total yards	132	548
Rushing yards	53	323
Passing yards	79	225
Turnovers	2	4
Time of possession	30:15	29:45

Team	Category	Player	Statistics
Washington State	Passing	Mars Lobbestael	7/17, 79 yards
Washington State	Rushing	Chantz Staden	17 rushes, 47 yards, TD
Washington State	Receiving	Jeshua Anderson	1 reception, 27 yards
Oregon State	Passing	Lyle Moevao	12/24, 186 yards, 2 TD, 4 INT
Oregon State	Rushing	Jacquizz Rodgers	23 rushes, 168 yards, TD
Oregon State	Receiving	Sammie Stroughter	6 receptions, 116 yards, TD

During the Beavers blow out of the Cougars, they managed to set a school record for most points in a Pac-10 game. "Quizz" had 168 yard day as the Cougars lost another quarterback. Washington State's quarterback problems, along with other difficulties would lead them to a 1-8 season. The Beavers on the other hand improved their record to 2-1 in the conference.

=== At Washington ===
	1	2	3	4	Total
Beavers	7	10	7	10	34
Huskies	3	3	0	7	13

Statistics	ORST	WASH
First downs	19	16
Total yards	421	377
Rushing yards	230	101
Passing yards	191	276
Turnovers	0	4
Time of possession	31:11	28:49

Team	Category	Player	Statistics
Oregon State	Passing	Lyle Moevao	18/22, 191 yards, TD
Oregon State	Rushing	James Rodgers	3 rushes, 110 yards, 2 TD
Oregon State	Receiving	Shane Morales	4 receptions, 61 yards
Washington	Passing	Ronnie Fouch	17/32, 276 yards, 3 INT
Washington	Rushing	Terrance Dailey	16 rushes, 102 yards, TD
Washington	Receiving	D'Andre Goodwin	5 receptions, 136 yards

The Beavers, led by the two Rodgers brothers, were able to fly by the winless Huskies in dramatic fashion. Jacquizz Rodgers had 93 yards, but the spotlight was on his older brother, James Rodgers who had over 200 yards returning kicks, running, and receiving. The Huskies would go on to lose the rest of their games, as they go winless in conference and non-conference.

=== Arizona State ===
	1	2	3	4	Total
Sun Devils	3	3	10	9	25
Beavers	7	0	10	10	27

Statistics	ASU	ORST
First downs	14	22
Total yards	217	261
Rushing yards	78	109
Passing yards	217	261
Turnovers	0	1
Time of possession	27:29	32:31

Team	Category	Player	Statistics
Arizona State	Passing	Rudy Carpenter	15/27, 217 yards, TD
Arizona State	Rushing	Shaun DeWitty	16 rushes, 110 yards
Arizona State	Receiving	Kerry Taylor	6 receptions, 81 yards
Oregon State	Passing	Sean Canfield	19/28, 218 yards, 2 TD, INT
Oregon State	Rushing	Jacquizz Rodgers	30 rushes, 133 yards
Oregon State	Receiving	James Rodgers	8 receptions, 102 yards

After a low-scoring half, the Beavers lead the Sun Devils 7-6 at halftime. Teams exchanged touchdowns and field goals in the third and fourth quarters. After Arizona State's last touchdown with 21 seconds remaining, Rudy Carpenter's pass on the two-point conversion was picked off by Victor Butler. The onside kick was also recovered by the Beavers as they held on to the win, and the undefeated home record.

=== At UCLA ===
	1	2	3	4	Total
Beavers	3	0	14	17	34
Bruins	3	0	3	0	6

Statistics	ORST	UCLA
First downs	18	17
Total yards	423	237
Rushing yards	201	48
Passing yards	222	189
Turnovers	2	4
Time of possession	32:47	27:13

Team	Category	Player	Statistics
Oregon State	Passing	Sean Canfield	16/22, 222 yards, 2 TD, INT
Oregon State	Rushing	Jacquizz Rodgers	31 rushes, 144 yards, TD
Oregon State	Receiving	James Rodgers	6 receptions, 115 yards
UCLA	Passing	Kevin Craft	20/42, 189 yards, 2 INT
UCLA	Rushing	Kahlil Bell	12 rushes, 45 yards
UCLA	Receiving	Taylor Embree	5 receptions, 64 yards

After two field goals by either side in the first half, the teams headed into the locker room at the half in a 3-3 tie. In the second half, the Beavers blew open the game and ended up only giving up a second Bruin field goal in the second half. The Beavers blew out the Bruins 34-6.

=== California ===
	1	2	3	4	Total
Golden Bears	7	7	7	0	21
Beavers	14	3	10	7	34

Statistics	CAL	ORST
First downs	11	20
Total yards	232	339
Rushing yards	85	194
Passing yards	147	145
Turnovers	2	1
Time of possession	25:14	34:46

Team	Category	Player	Statistics
California	Passing	Kevin Riley	11/25, 117 yards, TD, INT
California	Rushing	Jahvid Best	15 rushes, 116 yards, TD
California	Receiving	LaReylle Cunningham	2 receptions, 45 yards
Oregon State	Passing	Lyle Moevao	14/28, 145 yards, INT
Oregon State	Rushing	Jacquizz Rodgers	27 rushes, 144 yards, TD
Oregon State	Receiving	James Rodgers	6 receptions, 50 yards

=== At Arizona ===
	1	2	3	4	Total
Beavers	0	3	7	9	19
Wildcats	0	3	7	7	17

Statistics	ORST	ARIZ
First downs	17	19
Total yards	390	297
Rushing yards	166	139
Passing yards	224	158
Turnovers	0	0
Time of possession	27:17	32:43

Team	Category	Player	Statistics
Oregon State	Passing	Sean Canfield	20/32, 224 yards, TD
Oregon State	Rushing	Jacquizz Rodgers	10 rushes, 102 yards, TD
Oregon State	Receiving	Sammie Stroughter	5 receptions, 116 yards, TD
Arizona	Passing	Willie Tuitama	16/22, 158 yards, TD
Arizona	Rushing	Keola Antolin	25 rushes, 114 yards, TD
Arizona	Receiving	Rob Gronkowski	3 receptions, 50 yards, TD

=== No. 19 Oregon ===
	1	2	3	4	Total
No. 19 Ducks	17	20	7	21	65
Beavers	7	10	14	7	38

Statistics	ORE	ORST
First downs	22	25
Total yards	694	463
Rushing yards	385	89
Passing yards	309	374
Turnovers	0	4
Time of possession	29:36	30:24

Team	Category	Player	Statistics
Oregon	Passing	Jeremiah Masoli	11/17, 274 yards, 3 TD
Oregon	Rushing	Jeremiah Johnson	17 rushes, 219 yards, TD
Oregon	Receiving	Terrence Scott	2 receptions, 93 yards, TD
Oregon State	Passing	Lyle Moevao	27/51, 374 yards, 5 TD, 2 INT
Oregon State	Rushing	James Rodgers	7 rushes, 56 yards
Oregon State	Receiving	Sammie Stroughter	7 receptions, 145 yards

Oregon gained 694 yards on 69 plays, a 10.1 yard per play average. The loss was a Civil War record for points allowed as well as yards allowed, and kept the Beavers from going to the Rose Bowl for the first time since the 1964 season. The loss to Oregon snapped a six-game home winning streak by the Beavers and a two-game winning streak in the Civil War. The Beavers were knocked out of contention for the Rose Bowl, which matched up two of their previous opponents, USC and Penn State. The Beavers finished in the third place in the Pac-10.

=== Vs. No. 18 Pittsburgh (2008 Sun Bowl) ===
	1	2	3	4	Total
Beavers	0	3	0	0	3
Panthers	0	0	0	0	0

Statistics	ORST	PITT
First downs	15	10
Total yards	273	178
Rushing yards	80	89
Passing yards	193	89
Turnovers	3	2
Time of possession	30:50	29:10

Team	Category	Player	Statistics
Oregon State	Passing	Lyle Moevao	21/42, 193 yards, 2 INT
Oregon State	Rushing	Jeremy Francis	15 rushes, 76 yards
Oregon State	Receiving	Sammie Stroughter	6 receptions, 88 yards
Pittsburgh	Passing	Bill Stull	7/24, 52 yards, INT
Pittsburgh	Rushing	LeSean McCoy	24 rushes, 85 yards
Pittsburgh	Receiving	Dorin Dickerson	2 receptions, 37 yards

The Sun Bowl was played on December 31, 2008 in El Paso, Texas. Victor Strong-Butler was named the game's MVP.

== Rankings ==
Ranking movements Legend: ██ Increase in ranking ██ Decrease in ranking — = Not ranked
	Week															
Poll	Pre	1	2	3	4	5	6	7	8	9	10	11	12	13	14	Final
AP	—	—	—	—	—	—	—	—	—	—	—	23	21	17	25	19
Coaches	—	—	—	—	—	—	—	—	—	—	—	25	21	17	24	18
Harris	Not released				—	—	—	—	—	—	—	—	21	17	25	Not released
BCS	Not released							—	—	—	—	—	21	17	—	Not released

== Personnel ==
2008 Oregon State Beavers football team roster
Players
Coaches
Offense

Pos.	#	Name	Class
RB	1	Jacquizz Rodgers	Fr
WR	2	Chris Johnson	Sr
QB	3	Lyle Moevao	Jr
QB	5	Sean Canfield	Jr
WR	7	Kyle Brown	So
WR	8	James Rodgers	So
WR	13	Shane Morales	Sr
WR	15	Darrell Catchings	So
QB	16	Justin Engstrom	Fr
WR	18	Geno Munoz	Fr
WR	19	Sammie Stroughter	Sr
WR	20	Keynan Parker	Fr
RB	22	Jeremy Francis	Fr
WR	23	Jordan Bishop	Fr
RB	24	Ryan McCants	Fr
WR	25	Casey Kjos	So
WR	46	Aaron Nichols	So
OL	50	Mike Remmers	Fr
OL	51	Adam Speer	Sr
OL	57	Jeremy Perry	Sr
OL	60	Alex Linnenkohl	So
OL	65	Marcus Henderson	Sr
OL	66	Andy Levitre	Sr
OL	73	Gregg Peat	Jr
OL	76	Tavita Thompson	Sr
WR	80	Damola Adeniji	Jr
TE	81	Gabe Miller	So
TE	82	Colby Prince	Fr
TE	83	Brady Camp	So
WR	84	Taylor Kavanaugh	Jr
TE	85	John Reese	Jr
TE	87	Joe Halahuni	Fr
TE	88	Howard Croom	Jr
WR	89	Shawn McGarity	So

Defense

Pos.	#	Name	Class
LB	1	Dennis Christopher	Sr
DB	2	David Ross	Fr
DB	5	Cameron Collins	Fr
DB	6	Keenan Lewis	Sr
DB	9	Al Afalava	Sr
DB	10	Lance Mitchell	Fr
LB	12	Isaiah Cook	Sr
DB	14	Patrick Henderson	Jr
DB	17	Brandon Hardin	Fr
DB	21	Tim Clark	Jr
DB	28	Suaesi Tuimaunei	So
DB	30	Austin Hall	Sr
LB	31	Paul Jones	Fr
LB	32	Keaton Kristick	Jr
LB	33	Will Darkins	Fr
LB	35	Keith Pankey	So
DB	36	Brandon Hughes	Sr
LB	41	Bryant Cornell	Sr
DB	44	Greg Laybourn	Sr
LB	45	David Pa'aluhi III	Fr
LB	48	Walker Vave	So
LB	50	Casey Noack	Sr
LB	52	Keo Camat	So
DL	54	Stephen Paea	So
DL	55	Ben Terry	Jr
DB	58	Slade Norris	Sr
LB	59	Dwight Roberson	So
DL	74	Kevin Frahm	Fr
DL	77	Evan Hull	So
DL	78	Brennan Olander	So
DL	90	Victor Butler	Sr
DL	92	Mitchel Hunt	So
DL	94	Carl Sommer	Fr
DL	95	Latu Moala	Jr
DL	97	Sioeli Nau	Jr
DL	99	Pernell Booth	Sr

Special teams

Pos.	#	Name	Class
P	7	Johnny Hekker	Fr
K	18	Sean Sehnem	Jr
K	27	Justin Kahut	So
K	40	Matt Barker	Fr

Head coach

- Mike Riley

Coordinators/assistant coaches

- Jay Locey
  Associate head coach/wide receivers
- Danny Langsdorf
  Offensive coordinator/quarterbacks
- Mark Banker
  Defensive coordinator
- Arnold Alcantar
  Special teams coordinator
- Mike Cavanaugh
  Offensive line
- Reggie Davis
  Running backs
- Keith Heyward
  Secondary
- Greg Newhouse
  Linebackers
- Joe Seumalo
  Defensive line

Legend

- (C) Team captain
- (S) Suspended
- (I) Ineligible
- Injured
- Redshirt

Roster
Last update: January 16, 2017

== Statistics ==
=== Team ===
	Team	Opp
Scoring	394	300
Points per game	33	25
First downs	265	196
Rushing		
Passing		
Penalty		
Total offense	5016	3840
Avg per play		
Avg per game	418	320
Fumbles lost		
Penalties – yards	80-690	91-839
Avg per game	7-58	8-70

	Team	Opp
Punts – yards	50-1905	67-2864
Avg per punt	38.1	42.7
Time of possession	383:16	336:41
Time of possession/game	33:21	28:04
3rd down conversions	69-166 (42%)	50-160 (31%)
4th down conversions	9-15 (60%)	7-13 (54%)
Touchdowns scored		
Field goals – attempts – long	16-24-47	
PAT – attempts	44-47	
Attendance at Home	269,584	379,958
Games at Home/Avg per game	6 / 44,930	6 / 63,326

==== Scores by quarter ====
	1	2	3	4	Total
Oregon State	76	93	109	116	394
Opponents	57	104	63	76	300

=== Offense ===
==== Rushing ====
Name	GP-GS	Att	Yds	Long	Fum	Fum Lost	TD	Avg/Carry	Avg/game
Jacquizz Rodgers	11-11	259	1253	33	0	0	11	4.8	113.9
Ryan McCants	10-1	79	314	35	0	0	2	4	31.4
James Rodgers	12-12	46	408	55	0	0	5	8.9	34
Jeremy Francis	6-0	20	89	21	0	0	1	4.5	14.8
Sammie Stroughter	12-12	5	33	7	0	0	0	6.6	2.8
Johnny Hekker	12-12	1	-9	-9	0	0	0	-9	-0.8
Lyle Moevao	10-10	30	-82	16	0	0	2	-4	-8.6
Darrell Catchings	4-0	1	7	7	0	0	0	7	1.8
Chris Johnson	3-0	3	2	3	0	0	0	0.7	0.7
Sean Canfield	4-2	6	-28	2	0	0	0	-4.7	-7
TEAM		457	1975	55	0	0	21	4.3	165.4
Total		457	1975	55	0	0	21	4.3	165.4
Opponents									

==== Passing ====
Name	GP-GS	Effic	Att-Cmp-Int	Pct	Yds	TD	Lng	Avg/G
Lyle Moevao								
Justin Engstrom								
TEAM								
Total								
Opponents								

==== Receiving ====
Name	GP-GS	No.	Yds	Avg	TD	Long	Avg/G
Shane Morales							
Sammie Stroughter							
James Rodgers							
Jacquizz Rodgers							
Darrell Catchings							
John Reese							
Chris Johnson							
Brady Camp							
Casey Kjos							
Ryan McCants							
Total							
Opponents							

=== Defense ===
Name	GP	Tackles				Sacks	Pass defense		Interceptions				Fumbles		Blkd kick
Name	GP	Solo	Ast	Total	TFL-yds	No-yds	BrUp	QBH	No.-yds	Avg	TD	Long	Rcv-yds	FF	Blkd kick
Total															

=== Special teams ===
Name	Punting								Kickoffs				
Name	No.	Yds	Avg	Long	TB	FC	I20	Blkd	No.	Yds	Avg	TB	OB
Total													

Name	Punt returns					Kick returns				
Name	No.	Yds	Avg	TD	Long	No.	Yds	Avg	TD	Long
Total										
