= 1965 All-Pacific Coast football team =

American all-star college football team

The 1965 All-Pacific Coast football team consists of American football players chosen by the Associated Press (AP), the United Press International (UPI), and the Pacific Athletic Conference (PAC) coaches (Coaches) as the best college football players by position in the Pacific Coast region during the 1965 NCAA University Division football season.

The UPI selections were made by the UPI's West Coast Football Committee. USC halfback Mike Garrett, who also won the Heisman Trophy, received 45 points in the voting, more than any other player. Washington State safety Willie Gaskins received 43 points, and UCLA quarterback Gary Beban 40 points.

The Coach's team was selected by the conference's eight head coaches.

== Offensive selections ==
=== Quarterbacks ===
- Gary Beban, UCLA (AP-1; UPI-1; Coaches-1)
- Tom Roth, Washington State (AP-2; UPI-2)

=== Halfbacks ===
- Mel Farr, UCLA (AP-2; UPI-1; Coaches-1)
- Mike Garrett, USC (AP-1; UPI-1; Coaches-1)
- Tom Relles, California (AP-2; UPI-2)
- Ron Medved, Washington (AP-2)
- Don Moore, Washington (UPI-2)

=== Fullbacks ===
- Pete Pifer, Oregon State (AP-1; UPI-1; Coaches-1)
- Larry Ellmes, Washington State (AP-1; UPI-2)

=== Ends ===
- Kurt Altenberg, UCLA (AP-1; UPI-2; Coaches-1)
- Dave Williams, Washington (AP-1; UPI-2; Coaches-1)
- Steve Bunker, Oregon (AP-2; UPI-1)
- Doug Flansburg, Washington State (UPI-1)
- Rich Sheron, Washington State (AP-2)

=== Tackles ===
- Chuck Arrobio, USC (AP-1; UPI-1; Coaches-1)
- Russ Banducci, UCLA (AP-1; UPI-1; Coaches-1)
- Bill Stellmacher, Oregon State (AP-2; UPI-2)
- John Wilbur, Stanford (AP-2; UPI-2)

=== Guards ===
- John Garamendi, California (AP-1; UPI-1; Coaches-1)
- Frank Lopez, USC (AP-2; UPI-1; Coaches-1)
- Mark Richards, Oregon (AP-1)
- Dave Middendorf, Washington State (AP-2)
- Barry Leventhal, UCLA (UPI-2)
- Robin Larson, Washington State (UPI-2)

=== Centers ===
- Ron Vrilak, Washington State (AP-1; UPI-1)
- Paul Johnson, USC (AP-2; UPI-2; Coaches-1)

== Defensive selections ==
=== Defensive ends ===
- Jim Colletto, UCLA (UPI-2; Coaches-1)
- Tim Rossovich, USC (UPI-1)
- Al East, Oregon State (UPI-1)
- Jim Walker, USC (Coaches-1)
- Greg Hartman, Oregon State (AP-2)
- Erwin Dutcher, UCLA (AP-2)
- Ray Eaglin, Oregon (UPI-2)

=== Defensive tackles ===
- Wayne Foster, Washington State (AP-1; UPI-1; Coaches-1 [tie])
- Fred Forsberg, Washington (AP-1; UPI-2; Coaches-1)
- Ron Yary, USC (AP-2; UPI-1; Coaches-1 [tie])
- Jerry Inman, Oregon (AP-2)

=== Guards ===
- John Richardson, UCLA (AP-1; UPI-2 [defensive tackle]; Coaches-1)
- Mike Hibler, Stanford (AP-1; Coaches-1)

=== Linebackers ===
- Jeff Smith, UCLA (AP-1; UPI-1; Coaches-1)
- Jack O'Billovich, Oregon State (UPI-1; Coaches-1)
- Dave Tobey, Oregon (AP-1; UPI-1)
- Steve Radich, California (AP-2; UPI-2)
- Dallas Grider, UCLA (AP-2)
- Glenn Myers, Stanford (AP-2)
- Tim Casey, Oregon (UPI-2)
- Marv Bain, USC (UPI-2)

=== Defensive backs ===
- Willie Gaskins, Washington State (AP-1; UPI-1; Coaches-1)
- Nate Shaw, USC (AP-1; UPI-1; Coaches-1)
- Bob Stiles, UCLA (AP-1; UPI-2; Coaches-1)
- Tom Greenlee, Washington (AP-1 [linebacker]; UPI-2 [defensive back])
- Ken Moulton, California (AP-2; UPI-1)
- Tim Osmer, Oregon State (AP-1)
- Les Palm, Oregon (UPI-1)
- Dave Dillon, Washington (AP-2)
- Phil Lee, USC (AP-2)
- Dale Rubin, Stanford (AP-2)
- Mark Wicks, Washington State (UPI-2)
- John Guillory, Stanford (UPI-2)

== Key ==
AP = Associated Press

UPI = United Press International

Coaches = selected by the eight head coaches in the conference

== See also ==
- 1965 College Football All-America Team
