= 1964 All-Pacific Coast football team =

American all-star college football team

The 1964 All-Pacific Coast football team consists of American football players chosen by the Associated Press (AP), the United Press International (UPI), and the Pacific Athletic Conference (PAC) coaches (Coaches) as the best college football players by position in the Pacific Coast region during the 1964 NCAA University Division football season. One Pacific Coast player, Washington guard Rick Redman, was also a consensus first-team All-American.

== Selectors ==
The AP team was selected by members of the AP's West Coast Board and the AP sports writers in Seattle, Portland, San Francisco, and Los Angeles. California end Jack Schraub was the only unanimous choice.

The UPI selections included players from "major" and "minor" colleges. As part of its selection process, the UPI also presented awards to Tommy Prothro of Oregon State as Coach of the Year and Craig Morton of California as Player of the Year.

The Coaches team was selected by the PAC's eight head coaches. It consists of separate offensive and defensive teams. A total of 114 Pac-8 players were nominated, and 23 were selected. Only three players were unanimously selected by all eight coaches: USC halfback Mike Garrett; Stanford running back Ray Handley; and Stanford linebacker Jack Chapple.

== Teams with most honors ==
The 1964 USC Trojans football team led all other teams with five players receiving first-team honors from the AP, UPI, and/or Coaches: halfback Mike Garrett (AP-1, UPI-1, Coaches-1); tackle Bob Svihus (Coaches-1); guard Bill Fisk (AP-1, Coaches-1); defensive end Jeff Smith, USC (Coaches-1); and defensive back Gary Hill (Coaches-1).

The 1964 Oregon State Beavers football team won the conference championship and had three players who received first-team honors: tackle Rich Koeper (AP-1, UPI-1, Coaches-1); guard/linebacker Jack O'Billovich (UPI-1); and defensive back Dan Espalin (AP-1, Coaches-1).

Despite finishing in last place and compiling a 3–7 record, the 1964 California Golden Bears football team also placed three players on the first team: quarterback Craig Morton (AP-1, UPI-1, Coaches-1); end Jack Schraub (AP-1, UPI-1, Coaches-1); and defensive tackle Stan Duzura (AP-1, Coaches-1). Morton was also selected as a first-team All-American by the American Football Coaches Association, Football Writers Association of America, Newspaper Enterprise Association, Sporting News, Football News, and Time.

== Offensive selections ==
=== Quarterbacks ===
- Craig Morton, California (AP-1 [back]; UPI-1; Coaches-1)
- Bob Berry, Oregon (AP-1 [back]; UPI-2)
- Larry Zeno, UCLA (AP-2 [back]; UPI-3)

=== Backs ===
- Mike Garrett, USC (AP-1; UPI-1 [halfback]; Coaches-1)
- Ray Handley, Stanford (AP-1; UPI-1 [fullback]; Coaches-1)
- Clarence Williams, Washington State (AP-1 [defensive back]; UPI-1 [halfback]; Coaches-1)
- Charlie Browning, Washington (AP-2; UPI-2 [halfback])
- Mike Haffner, UCLA (AP-2; UPI-3 [halfback])
- Craig Fertig, USC (AP-2)
- Jim Allison, San Diego State (UPI-2 [halfback])
- Ray McDonald, Idaho (UPI-2 [fullback])
- Olvin Moreland, Oregon State (UPI-3 [halfback])
- Junior Coffey, Washington (UPI-3 [fullback])

=== Ends ===
- Jack Schraub, California (AP-1; UPI-1; Coaches-1)
- Kurt Altenberg, UCLA (AP-1; UPI-2; Coaches-1)
- Ray Palm, Oregon (AP-2; UPI-1)
- Len Frketich, Oregon State (AP-2)
- John Thomas, USC (UPI-2)
- Gary Garrison, San Diego State (UPI-3)
- Fred Hill, USC (UPI-3)

=== Tackles ===
- Richard Koeper, Oregon State (AP-1; UPI-1; Coaches-1)
- Kent Francisco, UCLA (AP-2; UPI-1; Coaches-1)
- Bob Svihus, USC (AP-2; Coaches-1; UPI-3)
- Lowell Dean, Oregon (AP-1; UPI-2)
- John Farris, San Diego State (UPI-2)
- Bill Fuller, Sacramento State (UPI-3)

=== Guards ===
- Rick Redman, Washington (AP-1 [guard]; UPI-2 [guard]; Coaches-1 [linebacker])
- Bill Fisk, USC (AP-1; Coaches-1)
- Jack O'Billovich, Oregon State (AP-1 [linebacker]; UPI-1 [offensive guard])
- Mark Richards, Oregon (AP-2; Coaches-1)
- Russ Banducci, UCLA (AP-1)
- Joe Neal, Stanford (AP-2)
- Walter Johnson, Los Angeles State (UPI-2)
- Bob Nichols, Stanford (UPI-3)
- Wally Dempsey, Washington State (UPI-3)

=== Centers ===
- Dave Tobey, Oregon (AP-1; UPI-1; Coaches-1)
- Dick Ruhl, Oregon State (AP-2 [linebacker]; UPI-2 [center])
- Sam Hard, California (AP-2)

== Defensive selections ==
=== Defensive ends ===
- Jim Lambright, Washington (AP-1; Coaches-1)
- Jeff Smith, USC (AP-2 [defensive tackle]; Coaches-1 [defensive end])
- Bob Howard, Stanford (AP-1)
- Greg Hardman, Oregon State (AP-2)
- Oliver McKinney, Oregon (AP-2)

=== Defensive tackles ===
- Stan Duzura, California (AP-1; Coaches-1)
- Gary Pettigrew, Stanford (Coaches-1)
- Fred Forsberg, Washington (AP-2)

=== Guards ===
- Koll Hagen, Washington (AP-1; UPI-3 [center]; Coaches-1)
- Russ Banducci, UCLA (Coaches-1)
- Ancer L. Haggerty, Oregon (AP-2)

=== Linebackers ===
- Jack Chapple, Stanford (AP-1; UPI-1 [guard]; Coaches-1)
- Tim Casey, Oregon (AP-2)
- Mike Otis, Washington (AP-2)

=== Defensive backs ===
- Dan Espalin, Oregon State (AP-1; Coaches-1)
- Dick Ragsdale, Stanford (AP-2; Coaches-1)
- Gary Hill, USC (AP-2; Coaches-1)
- Les Palm, Oregon (AP-1)
- Clancy Williams, Washington State (AP-1)
- Byron Nelson, UCLA (AP-2)

== Key ==
AP = Associated Press

UPI = United Press International

Coaches = based on voting by the eight conference coaches

== See also ==
- 1964 College Football All-America Team
