= Jack Chapple =

American football player (1943–1979)

No. 58
- Position: Linebacker

Personal information
- Born: July 23, 1943; Daytona Beach, Florida, U.S.
- Died: October 19, 1979 (aged 36); Palo Alto, California, U.S.
- Listed height: 6 ft 1 in (1.85 m)
- Listed weight: 225 lb (102 kg)

Career information
- High school: New Mexico Military Institute (Roswell, New Mexico)
- College: Stanford (1961-1964)
- NFL draft: 1965: 3rd round, 42nd overall pick
- AFL draft: 1965: 2nd round, 13th overall pick

Career history
- San Francisco 49ers (1965)

Awards and highlights
- Third-team All-American (1964); First-team All-PCC (1964)

Career NFL statistics
- Fumble recoveries: 2
- Touchdowns: 1
- Sacks: 1
- Stats at Pro Football Reference

Jack Chapple (July 23, 1943 – October 19, 1979) was an American professional football linebacker. He played for the San Francisco 49ers in 1965.
