= John Guillory (American football) =

American football player (born 1945)

No. 28
- Position: Cornerback

Personal information
- Born: July 28, 1945 (age 81); Berkeley, California, U.S.
- Listed height: 5 ft 10 in (1.78 m)
- Listed weight: 190 lb (86 kg)

Career information
- High school: St. Mary’s (Stockton, California)
- College: Stanford
- NFL draft: 1967: undrafted

Career history
- Oakland Raiders (1967)*; Cincinnati Bengals (1969–1970)
- * Offseason or practice squad member only

Awards and highlights
- Second-team All-PCC (1965)
- Stats at Pro Football Reference

John Lee Guillory (born July 28, 1945) is an American former professional football player who was a defensive back for the Cincinnati Bengals of the National Football League (NFL). He played college football for the Stanford Cardinal. He was also a member of the Oakland Raiders.
