= Mark Banker =

American football player and coach (born 1956)

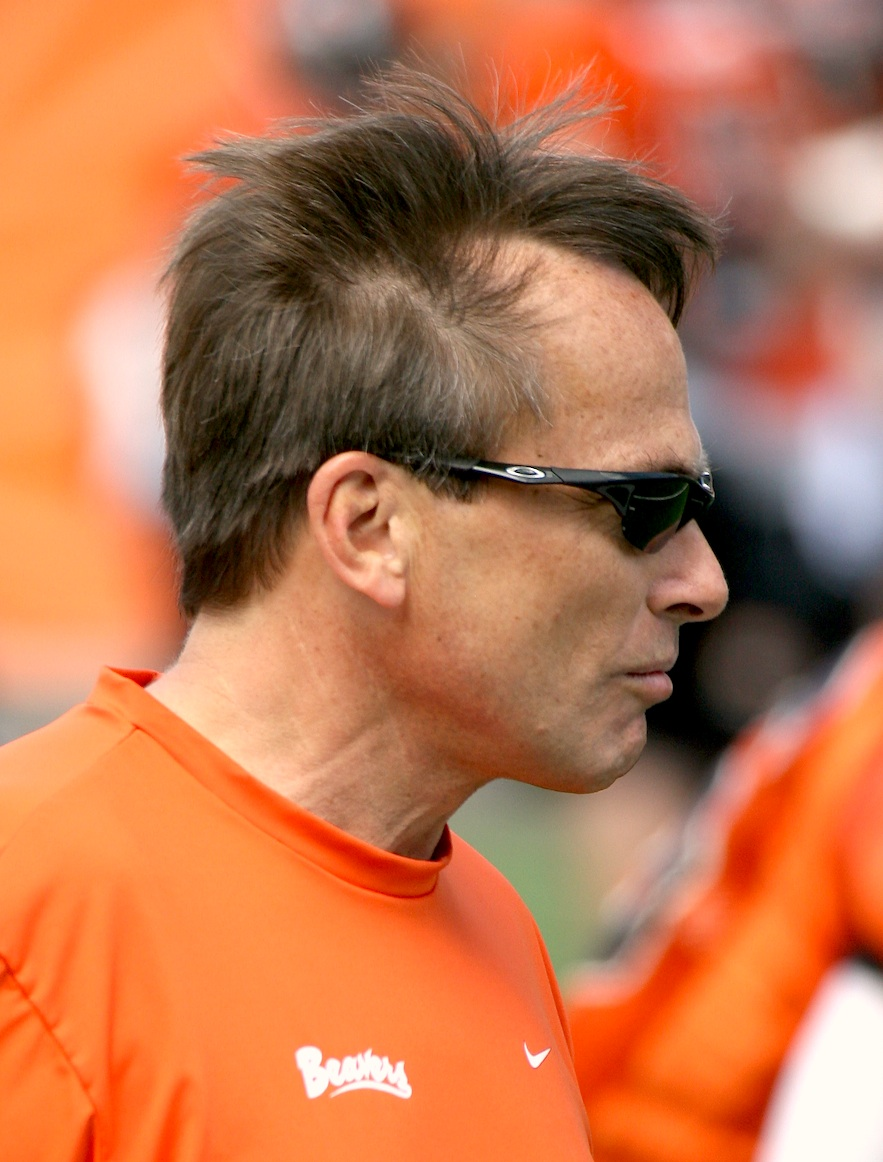
- Banker in 2006

Biographical details
- Born: January 15, 1956 (age 70); Plymouth, Massachusetts, U.S.

Playing career
- 1974–1978: Springfield
- Position: Running back

Coaching career (HC unless noted)
- 1979–1980: Springfield (OL/TE)
- 1981–1982: Cal State Northridge (DB)
- 1983–1994: Cal State Northridge (DC)
- 1995: Hawaii (OLB/ST)
- 1996: USC (AHC)
- 1997–1998: Oregon State (DB/RC)
- 1999–2001: San Diego Chargers (DC/CB)
- 2002: Stanford (AHC)
- 2003–2011: Oregon State (DC/RB/LB)
- 2012–2014: Oregon State (DC)
- 2015: Nebraska (DC)
- 2016: Nebraska (DC/S)
- 2018–2019: Hawaii (AHC/ILB)
- 2020–2021: Washington State (S)

Mark John Banker (born January 15, 1956) is an American football coach. Banker last coached safeties at Washington State University from 2021 to 2022. He was previously the assistant head coach and inside linebackers coach at the University of Hawaii. Previously, he served the defensive coordinator of the Nebraska Cornhuskers, the Oregon State Beavers and the San Diego Chargers.

== Coaching career ==
Banker has coached for the USC Trojans and in the National Football League for the San Diego Chargers. He followed Mike Riley from Oregon State to Nebraska when Riley was hired by the Cornhuskers in 2014. On January 11, 2017, after Riley and Banker coached Nebraska to two poor seasons, Banker was relieved of his duties as defensive coordinator. He was replaced by Bob Diaco. On January 5, 2018, it was announced that Banker was hired to be the assistant head coach and inside linebackers coach under Nick Rolovich at the University of Hawaii.

== Personal life ==
Banker graduated from Springfield College in Massachusetts in 1978 with a B.A. in physical education. Banker and his wife Debbie have 3 children, Chris, Jayme and Kelsey.
