= Gary Hill (American football) =

American football player (1943–2026)

No. 43
- Position: Defensive back

Personal information
- Born: June 29, 1943; Los Angeles, California, U.S.
- Died: August 9, 2026 (aged 83); Huntington Beach, California, U.S.
- Listed height: 6 ft 0 in (1.83 m)
- Listed weight: 200 lb (91 kg)

Career information
- High school: Rancho Alamitos (Garden Grove, California)
- College: USC (1961–1964)
- NFL draft: 1965: undrafted

Career history
- Minnesota Vikings (1965)

Awards and highlights
- National champion (1962); First-team All-PCC (1964)

Career NFL statistics
- Games played: 8
- Stats at Pro Football Reference

Gary Harold Hill (born June 29, 1943 – August 9, 2026) was an American professional football player who was a defensive back for the Minnesota Vikings of the National Football League (NFL). He played college football for the USC Trojans.

== Early life ==
Hill was born on June 29, 1943, in Los Angeles, California. He attended Rancho Alamitos High School in Garden Grove, California.

== College career ==
Hill played college football for the USC Trojans from 1961 to 1964 and was a three-year letterman from 1962 to 1964. He had six rushes for 37 yards with one reception for 14 yards in 30 games. In 1964, he earned first-team All-Pacific Coast honors.

== Professional career ==
After not being selected in the 1965 NFL draft, Hill signed with the Minnesota Vikings as an undrafted free agent. On August 9, he was waived. On August 12, Hill was signed to the taxi squad. On October 29, he was elevated to the active roster to play as a reserve safety and on special teams. During the 1965 season, Hill played in eight games. On August 30, 1966, he was waived by the Vikings.

== Personal life ==
After his playing career ended, Hill served in the U.S. Army in Korea. He later worked as a financial advisor for Dean Witter Reynolds and Morgan Stanley. Hill died on August 9, 2026, in Huntington Beach, California.
