= Tim Casey =

American football player (1944–2008)

No. 34, 51
- Position: Linebacker

Personal information
- Born: February 29, 1944; Portland, Oregon, U.S.
- Died: February 15, 2008 (aged 63); Portland, Oregon, U.S.
- Listed height: 6 ft 1 in (1.85 m)
- Listed weight: 225 lb (102 kg)

Career information
- High school: Jesuit (Beaverton, Oregon)
- College: Oregon
- NFL draft: 1966: undrafted

Career history
- Eugene Bombers (1967); Chicago Bears (1967–1969); Denver Broncos (1969)

Awards and highlights
- 2× Second-team All-PCC (1964, 1965)
- Stats at Pro Football Reference

Brian Richard Carey (February 29, 1944 – February 15, 2008) was an American football linebacker who played for the Chicago Bears and Denver Broncos of the National Football League (NFL). He played college football at University of Oregon.
