= Bob Vaughn =

American football player and actor (born 1945)

No. 61
- Position: Offensive guard

Personal information
- Born: June 8, 1945 (age 81); Memphis, Tennessee, U.S.
- Listed height: 6 ft 4 in (1.93 m)
- Listed weight: 240 lb (109 kg)

Career information
- High school: East (Memphis)
- College: Ole Miss (1963–1967)
- NFL draft: 1968: 3rd round, 75th overall pick

Career history
- Denver Broncos (1968–1969)

Career AFL statistics
- Games played: 1
- Stats at Pro Football Reference

Robert Curtis Vaughn (born June 8, 1945) is an American former professional football player who was an offensive guard for one game in the American Football League (AFL) with the Denver Broncos. He played college football for the Ole Miss Rebels and was selected in the third round (75th overall) of the 1968 NFL/AFL draft.

== Early life and education ==
Vaughn was born in Memphis, Tennessee, on June 8, 1945. He attended East High School in Memphis and was a two-sport star, being both a highly regarded football prospect and a top track athlete, specializing in hurdling. Coached by Bobby Brooks, Vaughn was a starter for the East team that tied for the division title in 1962, being named All-Memphis and All-State. Being "one of the most sought-after players in West Tennessee," he committed to play college football for the Ole Miss Rebels over offers from 20 other teams.

Vaughn spent his first year at Ole Miss, 1963, on the freshman team. He was not a member of the varsity team in 1964. Vaughn lettered in 1965 and became the team's starting right tackle on defense, after having been switched from offense. He also was put on the kickoff teams for his speed, while also being able to play tackle on offense and at wide receiver or tight end. He appeared in every game during the 1965 season.

Vaughn was initially named the team's starting offensive guard in 1966, replacing Stan Hindman who graduated. He ended up being the top reserve lineman, and also was used at tackle in addition to guard. As a senior in 1967, Vaughn was named a captain and served as the starting weakside offensive tackle for the Rebels. He graduated in 1968. In his three seasons on the varsity, Ole Miss made a bowl game every year.

== Professional career ==
Vaughn was selected in the third round (75th overall) of the 1968 NFL/AFL draft by the American Football League (AFL)'s Denver Broncos. He signed his rookie contract on June 12. He made the team as a reserve guard but only appeared in one game as a backup before being placed on injured reserve, later being waived off the list with Dave Washington on November 12. Vaughn attempted a comeback in 1969 but was waived before the regular season began.

== Later life ==
After being waived by the Broncos in 1969, Vaughn was hired as a baseball coach and assistant football coach at Sheffield High School. He later served as headmaster at Wonder Elementary School, Hamilton Junior High School, Rutledge Academy and Oakhaven Baptist Academy.

== AFL career statistics ==
Year	Team	Games	
Year	Team	GP	GS
1968	DEN	1	0
Career		1	0
