= Brendan McCarthy (American football) =

American football player (1945–1997)

No. 41, 40, 44
- Position: Running back

Personal information
- Born: August 6, 1945; Boston, Massachusetts, U.S.
- Died: August 26, 1997 (aged 52); Garrett County, Maryland, U.S.
- Listed height: 6 ft 3 in (1.91 m)
- Listed weight: 220 lb (100 kg)

Career information
- High school: DeMatha Catholic (Hyattsville, Maryland)
- College: Boston College (1964-1967)
- NFL draft: 1968: 4th round, 92nd overall pick

Career history
- Green Bay Packers (1968)*; Detroit Lions (1968)*; Atlanta Falcons (1968); Denver Broncos (1968–1969); Edmonton Eskimos (1969)
- * Offseason or practice squad member only

Awards and highlights
- Boston College Varsity Club Athletic Hall of Fame (1988)

Career NFL/AFL statistics
- Rushing yards: 175
- Rushing average: 3
- Receptions: 20
- Receiving yards: 188
- Total touchdowns: 3
- Stats at Pro Football Reference

Brendan Barrett McCarthy (August 6, 1945 – August 26, 1997) was an American professional football running back in the National Football League (NFL) and American Football League (AFL). He was drafted by the Green Bay Packers in the fourth round of the 1968 Common Draft. In August of that year he was traded to the Detroit Lions for undisclosed future draft pick. McCarthy then moved on to the Atlanta Falcons, where he played in 7 games before being released by coach Norm Van Brocklin. McCarthy played 9 games over two seasons with the Denver Broncos before eventually moving on to real estate.

McCarthy died on August 26, 1997, after a heart attack at his vacation home on Deep Creek Lake.
