= Jerry Inman =

American football player (1940–2024)

No. 62
- Position: Defensive lineman

Personal information
- Born: February 4, 1940; Manhattan, Kansas, U.S.
- Died: September 2, 2024 (aged 84); Battle Ground, Washington, U.S.
- Listed height: 6 ft 2 in (1.88 m)
- Listed weight: 256 lb (116 kg)

Career information
- High school: Evergreen (Vancouver, Washington)
- College: Boise State, Oregon
- AFL draft: 1965: Red Shirt 6th round, 41st overall pick

Career history
- Denver Broncos (1966–1973); Portland Storm (1974); Portland Thunder (1975)

Awards and highlights
- Second-team All-PCC (1965)
- Stats at Pro Football Reference

Jerry Franklin Inman (February 4, 1940 – September 2, 2024) was an American professional football player who played defensive lineman for the Denver Broncos of the American Football League (AFL) and National Football League (NFL).

Inman played college football for the Oregon Ducks. He played for the Broncos from 1966 to 1973. In 1974 and 1975, he played for the Portland Storm and the Portland Thunder of the World Football League (WFL).

== See also ==
- List of American Football League players
