= 2008 Sun Bowl =

American college football game

2008 Brut Sun Bowl
- 75th Sun Bowl
Oregon State Beavers	Pittsburgh Panthers
(8–4)	(9–3)
Pac-10	Big East
3	0
Head coach: Mike Riley	Head coach: Dave Wannstedt
AP / Coaches / BCS; 24 / 25 / NR	AP / Coaches / BCS; 18 / 21 / 20
	1	2	3	4	Total
Oregon State	0	3	0	0	3
Pittsburgh	0	0	0	0	0
- Date: December 31, 2008
- Season: 2008
- Stadium: Sun Bowl
- Location: El Paso, Texas
- MVP: DE Victor Butler, Oregon State
- Favorite: Oregon State by 2.5
- Referee: Greg Burks (Big 12)
- Halftime show: Village People
- Attendance: 49,037
- Payout: US$1,900,000 per team

United States TV coverage
- Network: CBS
- Announcers: Verne Lundquist, Gary Danielson
- Nielsen ratings: 2.2

The 2008 Brut Sun Bowl, part of the 2008–09 NCAA Division I FBS bowl season, was played on December 31, 2008 at the stadium of the same name on the campus of the University of Texas at El Paso in El Paso, Texas. The 75th annual contest pitted the Pittsburgh Panthers against the Oregon State Beavers. Pittsburgh previously appeared in the Sun Bowl in 1975 and 1989. Oregon State previously appeared in the Sun Bowl only once, in 2006. Entering the contest, the teams had a combined 3–0 record in Sun Bowls.

Oregon State won 3–0, the lowest scoring bowl game since a 0–0 tie between Air Force and TCU in the 1959 Cotton Bowl Classic and the lowest-scoring Sun Bowl since a 0–0 tie between Arizona State and Catholic University on January 1, 1940. It was the first shutout loss for the Panthers since 1996. This game, however, was special because the only points were scored on a field goal kicked off of a botched hold. The two teams combined for five turnovers and twenty punts while Victor Butler led the way with four sacks for the Beavers. Pittsburgh players would later refer to it as "the worst bowl game ever".

Oregon State opted to wear orange uniforms (while Pittsburgh wore blue), even though as the nominal visiting team they were required to wear white. As a result, they were docked a time out in lieu of a penalty that was assessed on the opening kickoff.

This game marked the 41st consecutive telecast by CBS Sports. No other network and bowl game has been paired for a longer period of time.

The halftime show included a performance by musical group The Village People as Sun Bowl officials broke the Guinness World Record for largest Y.M.C.A. dance.

== Scoring summary ==
Scoring Play	Score
2nd Quarter
OSU - Justin Kahut 44-yard FG, 2:18	OSU 3–0
