= Jack O'Billovich =

American gridiron football player (1942–1995)

Profile
- Position: Linebacker

Personal information
- Born: June 5, 1942; Butte, Montana, U.S.
- Died: February 13, 1995 (aged 52); Portland, Oregon, U.S.
- Listed height: 5 ft 11 in (1.80 m)
- Listed weight: 225 lb (102 kg)

Career information
- College: Oregon State

Career history
- 1967: Hamilton Tiger-Cats

Awards and highlights
- Grey Cup champion (1967); First-team All-American (1964); 2× First-team All-PCC (1964, 1965)

Melvin John "Mad Dog" O'Billovich (June 5, 1942 – February 13, 1995) was an American professional football player who played for the Hamilton Tiger-Cats. He won the Grey Cup with Hamilton in 1967. He previously played college football at Oregon State University under coach Tommy Prothro. His brother, Bob O'Billovich, and son Tony O'Billovich also played in the Canadian Football League (CFL).

O'Billovich died of heart disease in 1995. His ashes were scattered at the Tommy Prothro Football Complex practice football fields at Oregon State University. He was inducted into the Oregon Sports Hall of Fame in 2008.
