= 2003 Las Vegas Bowl =

- 12th Las Vegas Bowl
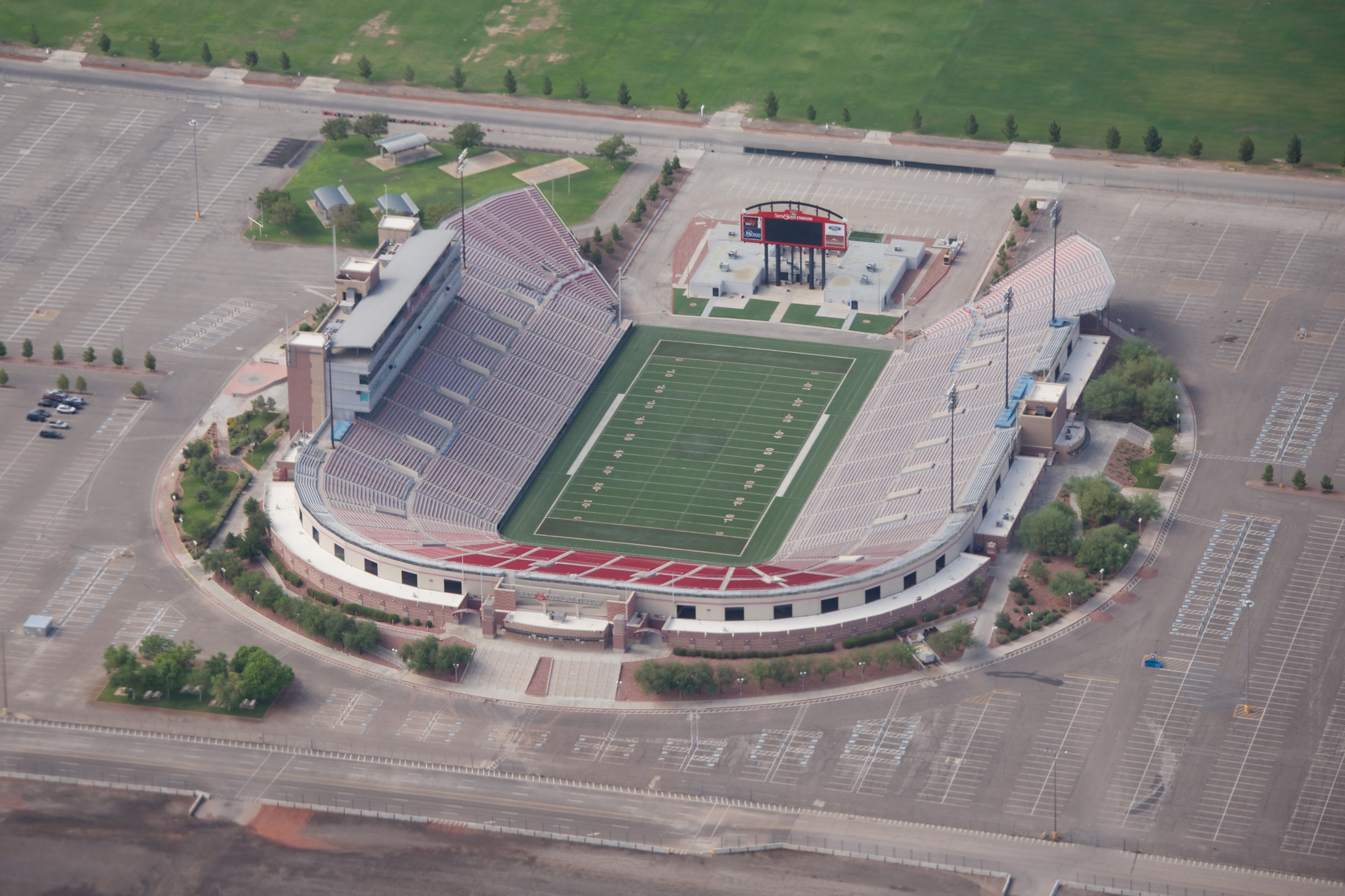
- Sam Boyd Stadium in Whitney, Nevada, hosted the Las Vegas Bowl.
Oregon State Beavers	New Mexico Lobos
(7–5)	(8–4)
Pac-10	Mountain West
55	14
Head coach: Mike Riley	Head coach: Rocky Long
	1	2	3	4	Total
Oregon State	17	14	10	14	55
New Mexico	7	0	0	7	14
- Date: December 24, 2003
- Season: 2003
- Stadium: Sam Boyd Stadium
- Location: Whitney, Nevada
- MVP: Steven Jackson (OSU)
- Referee: Joe Rider (ACC)
- Attendance: 25,437
- Payout: US$800,000 per team

United States TV coverage
- Network: ESPN
- Announcers: Sean McDonough (play by play); Craig James (analyst); Rod Gilmore (analyst); Rob Stone (Sidelines)

The 2003 Las Vegas Bowl was the 12th edition of the annual college football bowl game. It featured the Oregon State Beavers and the New Mexico Lobos. Oregon State's 55 points scored remains a Las Vegas Bowl record. Their 41-point victory margin is also a record.

== Game summary ==
Oregon State scored first after Derek Anderson threw a 34-yard touchdown pass to running back Steven Jackson to take a 7–0 lead. Both of those players went on to become notable in the NFL. Kirk Yliniemi's 21-yard field goal increased OSU's advantage to 10–0. New Mexico's quarterback Casey Kelly threw a 27-yard touchdown pass to Hank Baskett to cut the margin to 10–7. Derek Anderson threw his second touchdown pass of the quarter to wide receiver Mike Hass, a 42-yarder to take a 17–7 lead at the end of one quarter of play.

Steven Jackson provided the offense in the second quarter, scoring on touchdown runs of 3 and 11 yards, to increase Oregon State's lead to 31–7 at the half. Steven Jackson's third touchdown run of the game came in the third quarter, making it 38–7 OSU. Kirk Ylinmiemi added a 31-yard field goal in the third quarter, and Oregon State led 41–7 with one quarter remaining.

In the fourth quarter, Steven Jackson scored his fifth touchdown of the game, a 1-yard run to stretch OSU's lead to 48–7. Backup quarterback Kole McKamey threw a 17-yard touchdown pass to Dwight Counter to pull New Mexico to within 48–14. By then the game was already over, and backup quarterback Adam Rothenfluh threw a 19-yard touchdown pass to Josh Hawkins to make the final margin 55–14. Oregon State finished with 540 yards of total offense.
