= 2006 Sun Bowl =

American college football game

2006 Brut Sun Bowl
- 73rd Sun Bowl
- Sun Bowl Logo
Oregon State Beavers	Missouri Tigers
(9–4)	(8–4)
Pac-10	Big 12
39	38
Head coach: Mike Riley	Head coach: Gary Pinkel
AP / Coaches / BCS; 24 / T-25 / 22
	1	2	3	4	Total
Oregon State	14	0	7	18	39
Missouri	7	10	14	7	38
- Date: December 29, 2006
- Season: 2006
- Stadium: Sun Bowl
- Location: El Paso, Texas
- MVP: QB Matt Moore, Oregon State
- Referee: Penn Wagers (SEC)
- Attendance: 48,732
- Payout: US$1.9 million per team

United States TV coverage
- Network: CBS
- Announcers: Craig Bolerjack, Steve Beuerlein and Sam Ryan

The 2006 Brut Sun Bowl featured the Oregon State Beavers of the Pac-10 and the Missouri Tigers of the Big 12 Conference.

Running back Tony Temple started the scoring for Missouri as he took a handoff and ran 7 yards for a touchdown, to give Missouri an early 7–0 lead. Quarterback Matt Moore threw a 13-yard touchdown pass to wide receiver Sammie Stroughter to tie the game at 7. Matt Moore later ran for a 1-yard touchdown to increase the lead to 14–7.

Missouri placekicker Jeff Wolfert kicked a 30-yard field goal to cut the lead to 14–10. Quarterback Chase Daniel threw a 74-yard touchdown pass to wide receiver Danario Alexander, to give the lead to Missouri, 17–14.

In the third quarter, Matt Moore found all Pac-10 tight end Joe Newton for an 11-yard touchdown pass and a 21–17 Oregon State lead. Tight end Chase Coffman took a handoff, but then threw to a streaking Tommy Saunders for a 29-yard touchdown to give Missouri a 24–21 lead. Tony Temple later broke free on a 65-yard touchdown run to stretch the lead to 31–21.

Oregon State kicker Alexis Serna drilled a 29-yard field goal to cut the lead to 31–24. With 12:08 left in the game, Chase Daniel found Chase Coffman in the end zone for an 18-yard touchdown, stretching the lead to 38–24. With 6:02 left in the game, Matt Moore threw a 7-yard touchdown pass to running back Yvenson Bernard, to trim the lead to 38–31. Moore later fired a 14-yard touchdown pass to Joe Newton with only 23 seconds left to make it 38–37. Yvenson Bernard plowed ahead on the two-point conversion attempt, and Oregon State won 39–38.

Rihanna performed at halftime.
