= Fred Forsberg (gridiron football) =

American football player (1944–2021)

No. 52, 57, 56
- Position: Linebacker

Personal information
- Born: July 4, 1944; Tacoma, Washington, U.S.
- Died: January 26, 2021 (aged 76); Sammamish, Washington, U.S.
- Listed height: 6 ft 1 in (1.85 m)
- Listed weight: 235 lb (107 kg)

Career information
- High school: Tacoma (WA) Woodrow Wilson
- College: Washington
- AFL draft: 1966: 14th round, 121st overall pick

Career history
- Calgary Stampeders (1966); Victoria Steelers (1967); Denver Broncos (1968–1973); Buffalo Bills (1973); San Diego Chargers (1974)

Awards and highlights
- First-team All-PCC (1965); Second-team All-PCC (1964)

Career statistics
- Games played-started: 69-41
- Interceptions: 5
- Fumble recoveries: 5
- Stats at Pro Football Reference

Frederick Carl Forsberg (July 4, 1944 – January 26, 2021) was an American professional football player who played linebacker for six seasons for the Denver Broncos (#52), the Buffalo Bills, and the San Diego Chargers. Previously, he played for the Calgary Stampeders of the Canadian Football League (CFL) in 1966 and the Victoria Steelers of the Continental Football League (COFL) in 1967.
