= Terry Erwin (American football) =

American football player (born 1946)

No. 46
- Position: Running back

Personal information
- Born: August 30, 1946 (age 80); Weymouth, Massachusetts, U.S.
- Listed height: 6 ft 0 in (1.83 m)
- Listed weight: 190 lb (86 kg)

Career information
- High school: Beverly (Beverly, Massachusetts)
- College: Boston College
- NFL draft: 1968: undrafted

Career history
- Denver Broncos (1968)

Awards and highlights
- Scanlan Award winner (1967)

Career AFL statistics
- Rushing yards: 76
- Rushing average: 3.2
- Receptions: 2
- Receiving yards: 21
- Stats at Pro Football Reference

Terrence Lester Erwin (born August 30, 1946 in Weymouth, Massachusetts) is an American former professional football player who was a running back for one season (1968) with the Denver Broncos of the American Football League (AFL). He played college football for the Boston College Eagles. He left football for a business job, and in 2011, he had been working in real estate for 30 years.
