= Richard Koeper =

American football player (born 1943)

No. 78, 61
- Position: Offensive tackle

Personal information
- Born: July 23, 1943; San Francisco, California, U.S.
- Died: March 10, 2010 (aged 66); Corvallis, Oregon, U.S.
- Listed height: 6 ft 4 in (1.93 m)
- Listed weight: 260 lb (118 kg)

Career information
- High school: Sequoia (Redwood City, California)
- College: Oregon State (1962-1964)
- NFL draft: 1965: 6th round, 74th overall pick

Career history
- Atlanta Falcons (1966); BC Lions (1967)

Awards and highlights
- All-American (1964); All-Pac-8 (1964); Oregon State University Athletics Hall of Fame (1991)

Career NFL statistics
- Games played: 3
- Stats at Pro Football Reference

Richard Koeper was an American professional football player.

== Biography ==
Koeper was born Richard Manfred Koeper on July 23, 1943, in San Francisco, California. He died from a heart attack on March 13, 2010.

== Career ==
Koeper played the 1966 NFL season with the Atlanta Falcons. He had previously been drafted by the Green Bay Packers in the sixth round of the 1965 NFL draft. Later, he would play with the BC Lions of the Canadian Football League.

Koeper also served as an assistant coach at Oregon State University, where he had played at the collegiate level.
