= Drake Garrett =

American football player (born 1946)

No. 23
- Position: Defensive back

Personal information
- Born: March 19, 1946 (age 80); Dayton, Ohio, U.S.
- Listed height: 5 ft 9 in (1.75 m)
- Listed weight: 183 lb (83 kg)

Career information
- High school: Dunbar (Dayton)
- College: Michigan State
- NFL draft: 1968: 4th round, 102nd overall pick

Career history
- Denver Broncos (1968, 1970)

Career NFL/AFL statistics
- Interceptions: 2
- Fumble recoveries: 1
- Stats at Pro Football Reference

Drake Garrett (born March 19, 1946) is an American former professional football player who was a defensive back for the Denver Broncos of the American Football League (AFL) and National Football League (NFL) in 1968 and 1970. He played college football for the Michigan State Spartans.
