= Tom Oberg =

American football player (born 1945)

No. 27, 21, 47
- Position: Safety

Personal information
- Born: August 7, 1945 (age 81); Portland, Oregon, U.S.
- Listed height: 6 ft 0 in (1.83 m)
- Listed weight: 185 lb (84 kg)

Career information
- High school: Clackamas (Happy Valley, Oregon)
- College: Oregon State; Portland State (1966-1967)
- NFL draft: 1968: undrafted

Career history
- Denver Broncos (1968-1969); Winnipeg Blue Bombers (1971–1973); Portland Storm/Portland Thunder (1974-1975)

Career AFL statistics
- Interceptions: 3
- Fumble recoveries: 2
- Stats at Pro Football Reference

Thomas Harvey Oberg (born August 7, 1945) is an American former professional football player who was a safety for the Denver Broncos of the American Football League (AFL). He played college football for the Portland State Vikings.
