= Victor Butler =

American gridiron football player (born 1987)

No. 55, 57
- Position: Linebacker

Personal information
- Born: July 29, 1987 (age 39); Los Angeles, California, U.S.
- Listed height: 6 ft 2 in (1.88 m)
- Listed weight: 231 lb (105 kg)

Career information
- High school: Rialto (CA) Eisenhower
- College: Oregon State
- NFL draft: 2009: 4th round, 110th overall pick

Career history
- Dallas Cowboys (2009−2012); New Orleans Saints (2013); Arizona Cardinals (2014); Indianapolis Colts (2014); New York Giants (2015)*; Toronto Argonauts (2017)
- * Offseason or practice squad member only

Awards and highlights
- Grey Cup champion (2017); CFL East All-Star (2017); First-team All-Pac-10 (2008)

Career NFL statistics
- Total tackles: 91
- Sacks: 11.0
- Forced fumbles: 4
- Fumble recoveries: 2
- Stats at Pro Football Reference
- Stats at CFL.ca

Victor Allen Butler (born July 29, 1987) is an American former professional football player who was a linebacker in the National Football League (NFL). He played college football for the Oregon State Beavers and was selected by the Dallas Cowboys in the fourth round of the 2009 NFL draft.

== Early life ==
Butler attended Eisenhower High School in Rialto, California, where he was a teammate of future NFL player Ryan Clady.

He played as a defensive end (only as a senior), wide receiver, safety and kick returner. He was a two-time All-league selection and was named All-county as a senior.

== College career ==
Butler accepted a football scholarship from Oregon State University. As a true freshman, he was a backup defensive end, collecting 3 tackles and one blocked punt.

As a sophomore, he appeared in all 14 games as a backup, making 17 tackles (5.5 for loss) and 3 sacks. He had 4 tackles (2 for loss) and 1.5 sacks against the University of Washington.

As a junior, he played in 13 games (one start), posting 33 tackles (13 for loss), 10.5 sacks (third in the conference), one interception and one fumble recovery. He had 5 tackles against the University of Cincinnati.

As a senior, he was named team captain and posted career-highs in sacks (12, tied for school record), tackles for a loss (21.5, school-record), quarterback pressures (5), forced fumbles (4), fumble recoveries (2) and tackles (65), while being named first-team All-Pac-10. He tied a school single game sack record (4) in the 2008 Sun Bowl, on his way to being named the game's MVP.

He finished his college career after appearing in 49 games, registering 110 tackles (60 solo), 26 sacks (second in school history), 39.5 tackles for loss (fourth in school history), six forced fumbles, five fumble recoveries, five passes defensed and one blocked kick.

== Professional career ==
=== Dallas Cowboys ===
Butler was selected in the fourth round (110th overall) of the 2009 NFL draft. As a rookie, he was converted into an outside linebacker in a 3–4 defense and was the backup to DeMarcus Ware. On September 28, he recorded his first two career sacks and caused a fumble against the Carolina Panthers. On November 8, he made a key play by sacking Donovan McNabb with a shoestring tackle, which stopped a critical Philadelphia Eagles drive and helped preserve a Cowboys victory. On December 19, he made his first career start against the New Orleans Saints in place of an injured Ware, compiling one tackle and one quarterback pressure. He appeared in 16 games (one start), compiling 6 defensive tackles, 3 sacks, 2 quarterback pressures, 2 passes defensed, one forced fumble, one fumble recovery and 12 special teams tackles (tied for fourth on the team).

In 2010, he appeared in 15 games, posting 20 tackles, 2 sacks, 5 quarterback pressures, one forced fumble and 10 special teams tackles (seventh on the team).

In 2011, he appeared in 16 games, making 16 tackles (one for loss), 3 sacks, 9 quarterback pressures, one pass defensed and 14 special teams tackles (tied for third on the team).

In 2012, he appeared in 16 games (one start), collecting 23 tackles (one for loss), 3 sacks, 7 quarterback pressures, 3 passes defensed, one forced fumble, one fumble recovery and 4 special teams tackles. He started against the Chicago Bears in place on an injured Anthony Spencer, making one tackle and one fumble recovery. He wasn't re-signed after the season.

During his time with the Cowboys, he played behind outside linebackers Ware and Spencer, making it difficult for him to earn playing time. He was a productive pass rusher, but was not consistent defending the run.

=== New Orleans Saints ===
On March 28, 2013, Butler signed a two-year contract with the New Orleans Saints, reuniting with his former defensive coordinator Rob Ryan. On June 12, 2013, Butler suffered a torn ACL during training camp, after a collision with running back Mark Ingram II. On August 27, he was assigned to the reserve/physically unable to perform list, before being placed on injured reserve on December 11. He was waived on August 25, 2014.

=== Arizona Cardinals ===
On September 16, 2014, Butler was signed by the Arizona Cardinals, to provide depth after John Abraham was placed on the injured reserve list. He was declared inactive for the third game of the season. On September 30, he was released to make room for linebacker Desmond Bishop.

=== Indianapolis Colts ===
On October 6, 2014, he signed as a free agent with the Indianapolis Colts. He was cut on November 18. He was re-signed on November 24. He was released again on November 26, to make room for linebacker Shaun Phillips.

=== New York Giants ===
On January 5, 2015, the New York Giants signed him to a reserve/futures contract. On April 10, he was suspended four games for violating the NFL's policy on performance-enhancing drugs. On August 31, Butler's contract was terminated to make room for safety Stevie Brown.

=== Toronto Argonauts ===
On February 1, 2017, he signed with the Toronto Argonauts of the Canadian Football League after being out of football for a year. Butler caught attention early in the year by recording 8 sacks in his first 3 games. Despite missing 6 games with an injury, Butler was named a CFL East All Star, finishing the regular season with 31 tackles, 10 sacks and 4 forced fumbles in 12 contests, on his way to a Grey Cup championship over the Calgary Stampeders.

In late January 2018 Butler criticized the Argos for not allowing him to pursue NFL opportunities for the 2018 NFL season; following in the footsteps of teammate James Wilder Jr. who two days prior announced that he planned sit out of the 2018 CFL season in favor of having a chance of making it in the NFL. During the 2018 season while Butler sat out, the Argos finished as the worst team in the CFL with a 4−14 record, while the Toronto defense produced the fewest sacks and gave up the most points. On February 12, 2019, Butler officially became a free agent, and was reported to be considering a return to the CFL.

== Coaching career ==
Butler is now a coach for The Episcopal School of Dallas Eagles, an SPC school in Dallas. In 2021−22, the Eagles went undefeated but lost in the championship game against Houston Kinkaid.
