= Dave Tobey (American football) =

American football player (born 1943)

David Morgan Tobey (born March 17, 1943) is an American former professional football player who was a linebacker in the National Football League (NFL) from 1965 to 1968. Born in Portland, Oregon, he attended South Eugene High School and played college football for the Oregon Ducks before being selected by the Pittsburgh Steelers in the 10th round (130th overall) of the 1965 NFL draft. He failed to make an appearance for the Steelers and joined the Minnesota Vikings for the 1966 season. He played 16 times for the Vikings in two seasons, starting twice, before joining the Denver Broncos for the 1968 season. He played seven times for the Broncos in what turned out to be his final season in the league.
