= Mike Riley (gridiron football) =

American gridiron football player and coach (born 1953)

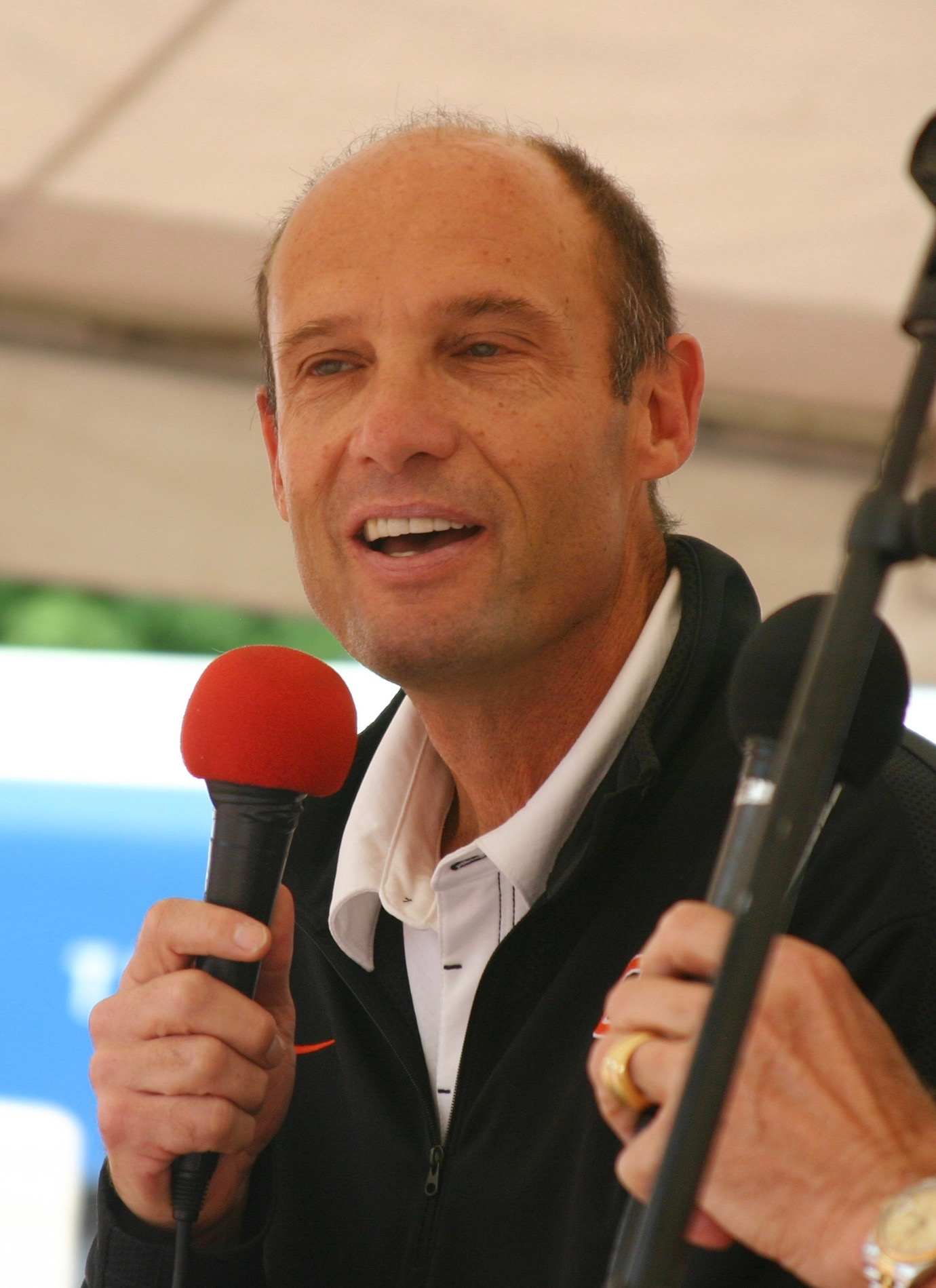
- Riley in 2010

Personal information
- Born: July 6, 1953 (age 73); Wallace, Idaho, U.S.

Career information
- High school: Corvallis (Corvallis, Oregon)
- College: Alabama (1971–1974)
- NFL draft: 1975: undrafted

Career history

Coaching
- California (1975) Graduate assistant; Whitworth (1976) Graduate assistant; Linfield (1977–1982) Defensive coordinator & defensive backs coach; Winnipeg Blue Bombers (1983–1985) Defensive backs coach; Northern Colorado (1986) Defensive coordinator & defensive backs coach; Winnipeg Blue Bombers (1987–1990) Head coach; San Antonio Riders (1991–1992) Head coach; USC (1993–1996) Assistant head coach, offensive coordinator, & quarterbacks coach; Oregon State (1997–1998) Head coach; San Diego Chargers (1999–2001) Head coach; New Orleans Saints (2002) Assistant head coach & defensive backs coach; Oregon State (2003–2014) Head coach; Nebraska (2015–2017) Head coach; Oregon State (2018) Consultant; San Antonio Commanders (2019) Head coach; Seattle Dragons (2020) Offensive coordinator & quarterbacks coach; New Jersey Generals (2022–2023) Head coach

Operations
- New Jersey Generals (2022) General manager

Awards and highlights
- USFL: USFL Coach of the Year (2022); CFL: 2× Grey Cup champion (1988, 1990); 2× CFL East Division (1988, 1990); 2× Annis Stukus Trophies (1988, 1990); NCAA: Pac-10 Coach of the Year (2008); National champion (1973)

Head coaching record
- Regular season: 12–8 (.600) (USFL)
- Postseason: 6–2 (.750) (CFL); 7–3 (.700) (college bowls); 0–1 (.000) (USFL)
- Career: 112–99 (.531) (college); 14–34 (.292) (NFL); 40–32 (.556) (CFL); 11–9 (.550) (WLAF); 5–3 (.625) (AAF); 12–9 (.571) (USFL)
- Coaching profile at Pro Football Reference

Michael Joseph Riley (born July 6, 1953) is an American football coach who was most recently the head coach of the New Jersey Generals of the United States Football League (USFL). He has previously served as the head coach of two college football programs: Oregon State (1997–1998, 2003–2014) and Nebraska (2015–2017). Riley has also been the head coach of teams in four different professional leagues: the Canadian Football League (CFL), World League of American Football (WLAF), National Football League (NFL), and Alliance of American Football (AAF). He played college football for the Alabama Crimson Tide in the 1970s.

== Early life and playing career ==
Born in Wallace, Idaho, Riley is the eldest of three sons of Bud and Mary (Shumaker) Riley. Bud was from a small town western Alabama (Guin, AL), served in the U.S. Navy during World War II, and had played college football at the University of Idaho in Moscow under head coach Dixie Howell, a hall of famer as a player at Alabama. After graduation, Bud worked for a mining company in Wallace and was asked by town leaders to coach at the high school; Mary was from nearby Mullan, where her parents, Mike and Mary Shumaker, ran a hotel. The family of four, now with middle brother Ed, moved from Wallace down to Lewiston in 1959, where Bud was the head coach at Lewiston High School for three seasons.

They moved up to Moscow in 1962, when Bud became a collegiate assistant coach at his alma mater, the University of Idaho, under new head coach Dee Andros. Youngest brother Pete was born while the family lived in Moscow. After three seasons on the Palouse, Andros was hired at Oregon State in 1965 and Bud joined his first staff in Corvallis and stayed for eight seasons, first as the secondary coach and later as defensive coordinator. Bud went on to become a head coach in the CFL.

Riley had a peripatetic youth and spent his first 11+ years in northern Idaho, but considers Corvallis his hometown. He arrived in the spring of 1965, near the end of sixth grade, and stayed through high school.

=== High school ===
Riley was a hometown hero in Corvallis from his athletic days at Corvallis High School, where he led the Spartans as the starting quarterback to consecutive state title games in 1969 and 1970, both played in Corvallis at OSU's Parker Stadium. Corvallis High School had narrowly won the early season matchup in 1969, but came up well short against Medford in the A-1 state championship, 27–0.

They avenged the loss to the Black Tornado the following year in the regular season 28–14, and again in the AAA state final, 21–10, with left-handed option quarterback Riley throwing two touchdown passes in the second quarter to build a 21–3 lead at halftime. He completed five of nine passes for 76 yards; prior to the final, Riley had thrown only 41 times in 11 games, with 23 completions (and ten wins). He was a three-sport athlete at CHS, also lettering in basketball and baseball.

=== College ===
Riley graduated from CHS in 1971 and opted not to play his college football in the Pac-8, but for the Alabama Crimson Tide in the SEC under head coach Paul "Bear" Bryant. He had family connections to the state and school: his father was born and raised in Guin and his uncle, Hayden Riley, was Alabama's assistant athletic director, head baseball coach (1970–79), and the former head basketball coach (1960–68). (Mike's cousin, Major Ogilvie, became a star running back for the Tide in the late 1970s; Ogilvie's mother Peggy was one of Bud Riley's five sisters.) In his four seasons at Alabama as a reserve defensive back, the Tide won four Southeastern Conference (SEC) titles and the 1973 UPI (Coaches Poll) national championship, though they lost the 1973 Sugar Bowl to Notre Dame on New Year's Eve. Until 1974, the final Coaches Poll was released before the bowl games.

== Coaching career ==
Riley began his coaching career immediately after his playing days ended, first as a graduate assistant at California in 1975, and then as a graduate assistant at Whitworth in Spokane, where he received his master's in physical education.

In 1977, he was hired as the defensive coordinator and secondary coach at Linfield College in McMinnville, Oregon. During his stay at Linfield he assisted head coach Ad Rutschman's Wildcats to a six-year record of 52–7–1, which included five conference titles and an undefeated NAIA Division II championship season in 1982.

=== CFL ===
Riley was hired as an assistant coach in the Canadian Football League in 1983 with the Winnipeg Blue Bombers, and was a part of their 1984 Grey Cup championship team.

Hired as the Bombers' head coach at age 33, Riley reportedly became the youngest head coach in CFL history in 1987 at Winnipeg but in fact was three years older than Bud Grant, who was 29 when he was hired as Winnipeg's head coach in January 1957 (Grant had turned 30 by the time he coached his first game that summer). Riley led the Blue Bombers from 1987 to 1990 and won two Grey Cups during his tenure.

=== WLAF ===
He also coached the San Antonio Riders of the defunct WLAF. He was intended to stay on as the Riders attempted to transition to the CFL (as the San Antonio Texans) for the 1993 CFL season, but the team folded before it could begin playing as a CFL team.

=== USC ===
Riley returned to the college ranks in 1993 when USC head coach John Robinson offered him the position of offensive coordinator and quarterbacks coach; he later became assistant head coach. The Mesa Tribune named him the league's top assistant coach in 1993 after leading the Trojan offense to record setting numbers. USC quarterback Rob Johnson set numerous Pac-10 and NCAA records under Riley's tutelage and later became a fourth-round NFL draft pick. "He's a player's coach, who gets the most out of you by treating you like normal", Johnson later said.

Riley remained at USC through the 1996 season, helping the Trojans to post-season victories in the Freedom, Cotton, and Rose Bowls. USC won an outright league title, shared another, and finished second once.

=== Oregon State ===
Riley was hired as the head coach at Oregon State in 1997 to replace Jerry Pettibone, who had resigned at the end of the 1996 season. Riley's initial contract was a five-year deal at $185,000 per year. In the Beavers first season under Riley, they posted a record of 3–8. This was a difficult season for Riley as he attempted to run his NFL-style offense with players recruited by Pettibone to run the wishbone triple-option. The 1998 season was a big step in the right direction, with the Beavers posting a 5–6 record, their best record since 1971. Two of the six losses were by a single point, to Washington and California in back-to-back games late in the season. This was followed by a last-minute loss to a highly ranked UCLA team. The 1998 season was capped off by a double-overtime 44–41 victory over the rival Oregon Ducks in the Civil War game.

Although his first stint with the Beavers only lasted two seasons, Riley is considered by many to have laid the foundation for the success of the Beavers in the years to come. The 1999 team, led by Dennis Erickson and built around players Riley recruited, posted a 7–5 record and earned a trip to the Oahu Bowl, which ended a streak of 28 straight losing seasons.

=== NFL ===
In January 1999, Riley left the Beavers to become the head coach of the San Diego Chargers of the NFL, signing a five-year deal at $750,000 per year. Riley coached the Chargers from 1999 to 2001, with a record of 14–34. In 2000, the Chargers had their worst season; they went 1–15, with their only win on a last-second field goal against the Kansas City Chiefs. Riley's last game was indicative of his last season, as the Chargers played well, but one poor play turned the tide. The 2001 Chargers ended their 5–11 season with a loss to the Seattle Seahawks, after Doug Flutie passed for 377 yards and drove for the tying field goal with 16 seconds remaining, but poor special teams play led to a long Seahawks kick return and subsequently a 54-yard winning field goal.

Riley was fired as head coach of the Chargers after three seasons and was an assistant coach with the New Orleans Saints in 2002. He was offered the Alabama job in December 2002 after Dennis Franchione left for Texas A&M. Riley was also under consideration for the UCLA job during that period.

=== Return to Oregon State ===
After spending the 2002 season with the New Orleans Saints, Riley returned to Corvallis to become the head coach at Oregon State in 2003 following Erickson's departure to become the head coach of San Francisco 49ers of the NFL. Riley agreed to a seven-year contract that started at $625,000 per year and increased incrementally to $950,000 in year seven.

Continuing on their new success, the Beavers won bowl games in 2003 and 2004 before having a down year in 2005.

After starting the 2006 season 2–3, the Beavers went 9–4 on the regular season, including an upset of #3 USC in Corvallis. The Beavers completed their impressive season with a win over Missouri in the Sun Bowl in El Paso, Texas, ending their season with a 10–4 record.

In 2007, the Beavers again started 2–3 and finished 8–4 on the regular season, including an upset of #2 Cal in Berkeley. The Beavers finished the year 9–4 with a win in the Emerald Bowl in San Francisco over the Maryland Terrapins.

In 2008, Riley's Beavers knocked off #1-ranked USC 27–21 at Reser Stadium. The Beavers went into the Civil War with a chance to reach the Rose Bowl as Pac-10 champions but were defeated by Oregon, 65–38, and instead accepted another invitation to the third place Sun Bowl, where they beat Pittsburgh in a defensive struggle, 3–0.

Though winless in bowl games as a player, Riley had a 6–2 NCAA football bowl record as a head coach through the 2013 season, having won the 2003 Las Vegas Bowl, 2004 Insight Bowl, 2006 Sun Bowl, 2007 Emerald Bowl, 2008 Sun Bowl, and 2013 Hawaii Bowl. Riley was a combined 9–2 in bowl games as a head or assistant coach. In the 2009 Las Vegas Bowl, the Beavers lost to the BYU Cougars of the Mountain West Conference.

In Riley's second stint at Oregon State, the Beavers produced four NFL quarterbacks, Sean Mannion, Sean Canfield, Matt Moore, and Derek Anderson.

Following the 2009 season, Riley was rumored to be up for the USC vacancy created by the resignation of Pete Carroll. Those rumors were put to rest when Riley signed a three-year extension at OSU through the 2019 season.

During the 2012 season, Riley snatched his 75th career win surpassing Lon Stiner as Oregon State's all-time winningest coach. Riley completed his second stint at Oregon State with an 85–66 (.563) record in a dozen seasons. His 93 wins overall in 14 seasons at OSU are the most in school history.

=== Nebraska ===
On December 4, 2014, Riley was named head coach of the Nebraska Cornhuskers.

In his first season as head coach at Nebraska, Riley's Cornhuskers completed a 5–7 regular season (their first losing season since 2007) with numerous last second losses; notable among these was the Huskers' first game under Riley, wherein they lost to BYU, 33–28, on a last-second Hail Mary pass from the Cougars' backup quarterback, Tanner Mangum, to wide receiver Mitch Mathews (a loss which snapped Nebraska's streak of 29 consecutive home opener wins). Despite their losing season, however, the Cornhuskers were still invited to a post-season bowl game due to a lack of enough eligible teams to fill all bowl slots and the team high academic progress rate (APR). The Cornhuskers defeated the UCLA Bruins in the 2015 Foster Farms Bowl, finishing the season 6–7. 2016 saw improvement as the team began the season with seven straight wins and reached number 7 in the AP Poll, and finished 9–4 overall after losses to Wisconsin, Ohio State, Iowa, and Tennessee in the Music City Bowl. The Huskers significantly regressed in 2017, going on a four-game losing streak to finish 4–8, the school's worst record since 1961. The last three of those losses saw Nebraska surrender at least 50 points. Riley was fired following the season.

=== Second return to Oregon State ===
On December 7, 2017, it was announced that Riley would return to Oregon State to be the assistant head coach under newly hired Oregon State head coach Jonathan Smith, who had been both a player (1998) and a graduate assistant coach (2003) during Riley's first and second tenures as head coach at Oregon State.

=== San Antonio Commanders ===
In June 2018, Riley was named the head coach of the San Antonio Commanders of the Alliance of American Football.

=== Seattle Dragons ===
On June 6, 2019, Riley was named the offensive coordinator and quarterbacks coach for Seattle's new XFL team, the Seattle Dragons. He missed the first three games of the season for personal reasons.

=== New Jersey Generals ===
On January 6, 2022, Riley was named the Head coach and General manager for the New Jersey Generals of the United States Football League. On January 1, 2024, it was announced the Generals would not be a part of the UFL Merger.

== Head coaching record ==
=== Professional ===
==== CFL ====
Team	Year	Regular season					Postseason		
Team	Year	Won	Lost	Ties	Win %	Finish	Won	Lost	Result
WPG	1987	12	6	0	.667	1st in East Division	0	1	Lost in East Final
WPG	1988	9	9	0	.500	2nd in East Division	3	0	Won 76th Grey Cup
WPG	1989	7	11	0	.389	3rd in East Division	1	1	Lost in East Final
WPG	1990	12	6	0	.667	1st in East Division	2	0	Won 78th Grey Cup
Total		40	32	0	.556	2 Division; Championships	6	2	2 Grey Cups

==== WLAF ====
Team	Year	Regular season					Postseason		
Team	Year	Won	Lost	Ties	Win %	Finish	Won	Lost	Result
SAR	1991	4	6	0	.400	2nd in North American West Division	did not qualify		
SAR	1992	7	3	0	.700	3rd in North American West Division	did not qualify		
SAR	1993	0	0	0	Team folded before season				
Total		11	9	0	.550	-	0	0	-

==== NFL ====
Team	Year	Regular season					Postseason			
Team	Year	Won	Lost	Ties	Win %	Finish	Won	Lost	Win %	Result
SD	1999	8	8	0	.500	3rd in AFC West	–	–	–	–
SD	2000	1	15	0	.063	5th in AFC West	–	–	–	–
SD	2001	5	11	0	.313	5th in AFC West	–	–	–	–
SD total		14	34	0	.292		0	0	.000	
Total		14	34	0	.292		0	0	.000	

==== AAF ====
Team	Year	Regular season					Postseason			
Team	Year	Won	Lost	Ties	Win %	Finish	Won	Lost	Win %	Result
SA	2019	5	3	0	.625	--	--	--	--	--

==== USFL ====
Team	Year	Regular season					Postseason			
Team	Year	Won	Lost	Ties	Win %	Finish	Won	Lost	Win %	Result
NJ	2022	9	1	0	.900	1st (North Division)	0	1	.000	Lost in Division Finals to Philadelphia Stars
NJ	2023	3	7	0	.300	4th (North Division)	—	—	—	—
Total		12	8	0	.647		—	—	—	—

=== College ===
Year	Team	Overall	Conference	Standing	Bowl/playoffs	Coaches^{#}	AP^{°}
Oregon State Beavers (Pacific-10 Conference) (1997–1998)
1997	Oregon State	3–8	0–8	10th			
1998	Oregon State	5–6	2–6	T–8th			
Oregon State Beavers (Pacific-10 / Pac-12 Conference) (2003–2014)
2003	Oregon State	8–5	4–4	T–4th	W Las Vegas		
2004	Oregon State	7–5	5–3	T–3rd	W Insight		
2005	Oregon State	5–6	3–5	7th			
2006	Oregon State	10–4	6–3	3rd	W Sun	22	21
2007	Oregon State	9–4	6–3	3rd	W Emerald		25
2008	Oregon State	9–4	7–2	T–2nd	W Sun	19	18
2009	Oregon State	8–5	6–3	T–2nd	L Las Vegas		
2010	Oregon State	5–7	4–5	T–5th			
2011	Oregon State	3–9	3–6	5th (North)			
2012	Oregon State	9–4	6–3	3rd (North)	L Alamo	19	20
2013	Oregon State	7–6	4–5	T–4th (North)	W Hawaii		
2014	Oregon State	5–7	2–7	T–5th (North)			
Oregon State:		93–80	58–63				
Nebraska Cornhuskers (Big Ten Conference) (2015–2017)
2015	Nebraska	6–7	3–5	4th (West)	W Foster Farms		
2016	Nebraska	9–4	6–3	T–2nd (West)	L Music City		
2017	Nebraska	4–8	3–6	5th (West)			
Nebraska:		19–19	12–14				
Total:		112–99					
^{#}Rankings from final Coaches Poll.; ^{°}Rankings from final AP Poll.

== See also ==
- List of college football head coaches with non-consecutive tenure
