= Sean Canfield =

American football player (born 1986)

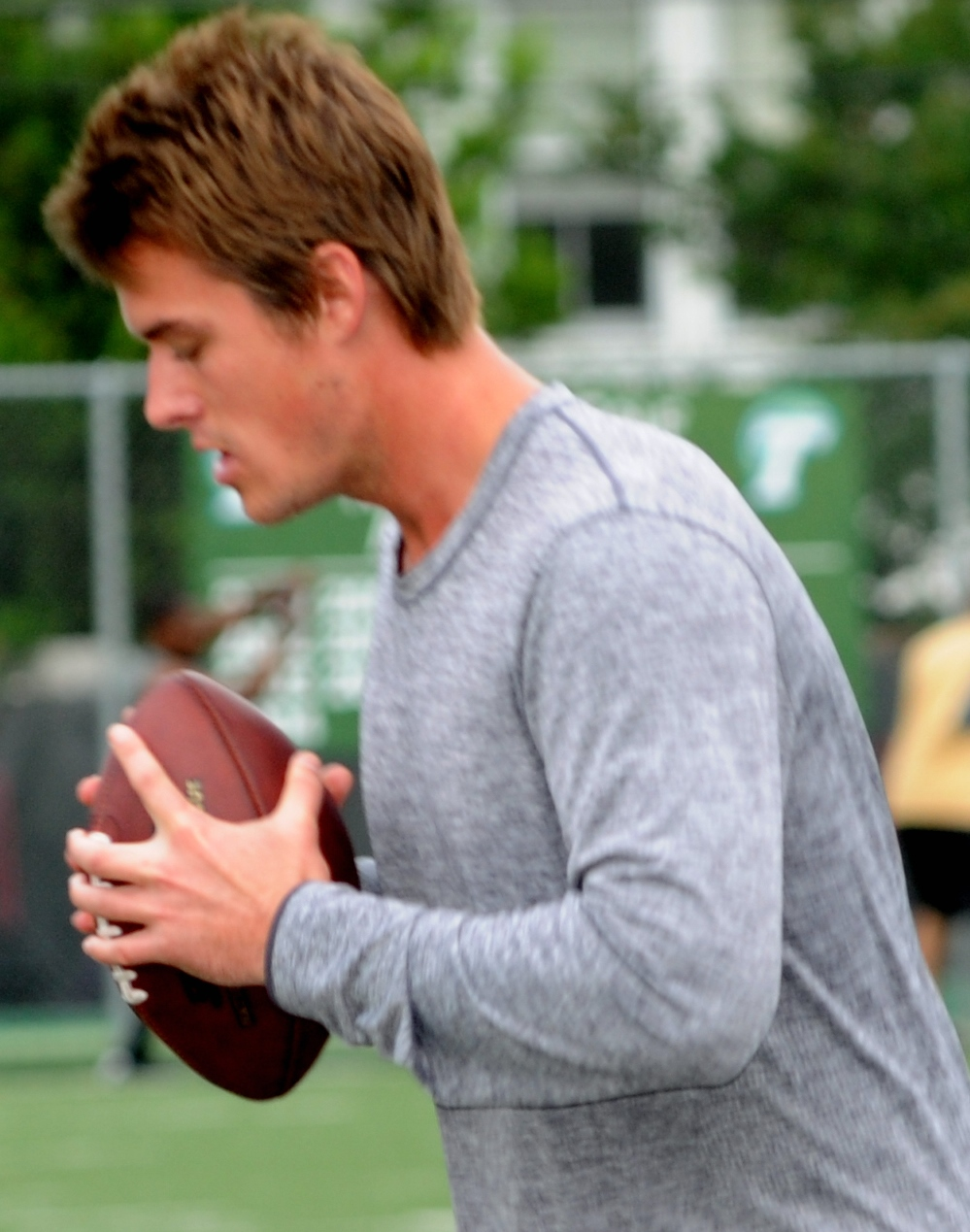
- Canfield practices at Tulane University with the Saints in 2011

No. 4
- Position: Quarterback

Personal information
- Born: November 12, 1986 (age 39); La Jolla, California, U.S.
- Listed height: 6 ft 4 in (1.93 m)
- Listed weight: 223 lb (101 kg)

Career information
- High school: Carlsbad (Carlsbad, California)
- College: Oregon State
- NFL draft: 2010: 7th round, 239th overall pick

Career history
- New Orleans Saints (2010–2011)

Awards and highlights
- First-team All-Pac-10 (2009)
- Stats at Pro Football Reference

Sean Canfield (born November 12, 1986) is an American former professional football player who was a quarterback in the National Football League (NFL). He played college football for the Oregon State Beavers and was selected by the New Orleans Saints in the seventh round of the 2010 NFL draft.

== Early life ==
Canfield attended Carlsbad High School in Carlsbad, California. As a senior, he completed 119 of 214 passes for 1,691 yards and 13 touchdowns.

== College career ==
After being redshirted as a freshman at Oregon State University in 2005, Canfield played in eight games as a backup quarterback in 2006, completing 28 of 45 passes for 355 yards two touchdowns and three interceptions. As a sophomore in 2007 Canfield started the first nine games for the Beavers before suffering an injury against the USC Trojans. He finished the season completing 165 of 286 passes for 1,661 yards, nine touchdowns and 15 interceptions. As a junior in 2008 he missed most of the teams practice in August and the first few weeks of the season while rehabilitating from his left shoulder injury that he suffered the previous season. He ended up starting only two games. He finished the season completing 56 of 84 attempts for 703 yards with six touchdowns and two interceptions.

Canfield finished his senior season in 2009 with completing 303 of 446 pass attempts for 3,271 yards, 21 touchdowns, and seven interceptions as the Beavers ended the season with an 8–5 record.

=== Statistics ===
Year	Team	Passing								Rushing			
Year	Team	Cmp	Att	Pct	Yds	Y/A	TD	Int	Rtg	Att	Yds	Avg	TD
2006	Oregon State	28	45	62.2	335	7.4	2	2	130.5	3	10	3.3	1
2007	Oregon State	165	286	57.7	1,661	5.8	9	15	106.4	36	115	3.2	0
2008	Oregon State	56	84	66.7	703	8.4	6	2	155.8	6	28	4.7	0
2009	Oregon State	303	446	67.9	3,271	7.3	21	7	141.9	48	160	3.3	2
Career		552	861	64.1	5,970	6.9	38	26	130.9	93	313	3.4	3

== Professional career ==
Pre-draft measurables
Height	Weight	Arm length	Hand span	40-yard dash	10-yard split	20-yard split	20-yard shuttle	Three-cone drill	Vertical jump	Broad jump
6 ft 3 3/4 in (1.92 m)	223 lb (101 kg)	32 3/4 in (0.83 m)	9 1/4 in (0.23 m)	4.99 s	1.75 s	2.90 s	4.39 s	7.26 s	29.5 in (0.75 m)	8 ft 4 in (2.54 m)
All values from NFL Combine

He was rated the 16th best quarterback in the 2010 NFL draft by NFLDraftScout.com. He was selected by the New Orleans Saints in the seventh round with the 239th overall pick. Prior to being waived on August 31, he was competing for the backup quarterback position behind starter Drew Brees. During the 2010 season, Canfield spent time jumping back and forth from the active roster to the practice squad without seeing any game action. He was re-signed to the active roster from the practice squad following the season, but was waived during final roster cuts again on September 3, 2011. He spent time on the team's practice squad and active roster again during the season. He was re-signed to the active roster following the season on January 14, 2012. On August 31, the Saints cut Canfield.
