= Sammie Stroughter =

American football player (born 1986)

No. 19, 18
- Position: Wide receiver

Personal information
- Born: January 3, 1986 (age 40); Vallejo, California, U.S.
- Listed height: 5 ft 10 in (1.78 m)
- Listed weight: 189 lb (86 kg)

Career information
- High school: Granite Bay (CA)
- College: Oregon State
- NFL draft: 2009: 7th round, 233rd overall pick

Career history
- Tampa Bay Buccaneers (2009–2012)

Awards and highlights
- Third-team All-American (2006); First-team All-Pac-10 (2008); Second-team All-Pac-10 (2006)

Career NFL statistics
- Receptions: 60
- Receiving yards: 639
- Receiving touchdowns: 1
- Return yards: 1,078
- Return touchdowns: 1
- Stats at Pro Football Reference

Sammie Stroughter (born January 3, 1986) is an American former professional football player who was a wide receiver in the National Football League (NFL). He played college football for the Oregon State Beavers and was selected by the Tampa Bay Buccaneers in the seventh round of the 2009 NFL draft.

== Early life ==
Stroughter attended Granite Bay High School in Granite Bay, California. For the Grizzlies, Stroughter played wide receiver, running back, defensive back, and kick returner for head coach Ernie Cooper. As an all-purpose back his senior year, he rushed for 986 yards on 126 carries (7.8 average) and scored 15 touchdowns in addition to catching 31 passes for 618 yards (19.9 average) and six touchdowns. Stroughter also returned kickoffs and tallied 322 return yards as well as 22 punt returns for 395 yards and two touchdowns. For his career, he had 2,321 all-purpose yards. His honors included First team All-Sierra League, first team all-section as a senior, and first team all-metro as a senior by the Sacramento Bee. Stroughter earned two letters in football and three in track and field as a 100-meter standout.

== College career ==
Stoughter played collegiately for the Oregon State Beavers. During his time with the program, Stroughter became one of the most honored players in the history of the Oregon State program and one of the top receivers in the Pac-10. He completed his career third at OSU for career receptions (164) and yards (2,653). His all-purpose total was 4,299 yards, fourth at OSU. He owns the fourth-best (1,293 yards/2006) and sixth-best (1,040 yards/2008) single-season receiving yards mark at OSU. He graduated from Oregon State with a degree in sociology.

== Professional career ==
=== Tampa Bay Buccaneers ===
In Week 6 of the 2009 season, Stroughter returned a kickoff 97 yards for a touchdown against the Carolina Panthers, marking the third time it had been accomplished in franchise history. He recorded his first career receiving touchdown in a Week 9, 38-28 victory over the Green Bay Packers. He was placed on season-ending injured reserve with a broken foot on December 21.

In Week 13 of the 2010 season, Stroughter caught a season-high all six targets and rushed once for two yards in a home loss to Atlanta. On the Buccaneers' final drive of the game, Stroughter made a spectacular catch on fourth-and-11 that made ESPN Sports Center's NFL Week 13 Top Ten Plays.

After Week 2 of the 2012 season, Stroughter was placed on Injured Reserve after injuring his foot.

=== Coaching career ===
After 2 years as an assistant coach at his alma mater Granite Bay High School, Stroughter was named the head football coach at Rio Americano High School in Sacramento, California in June 2017.
