= Andrew Luck =

American football player and executive (born 1989)

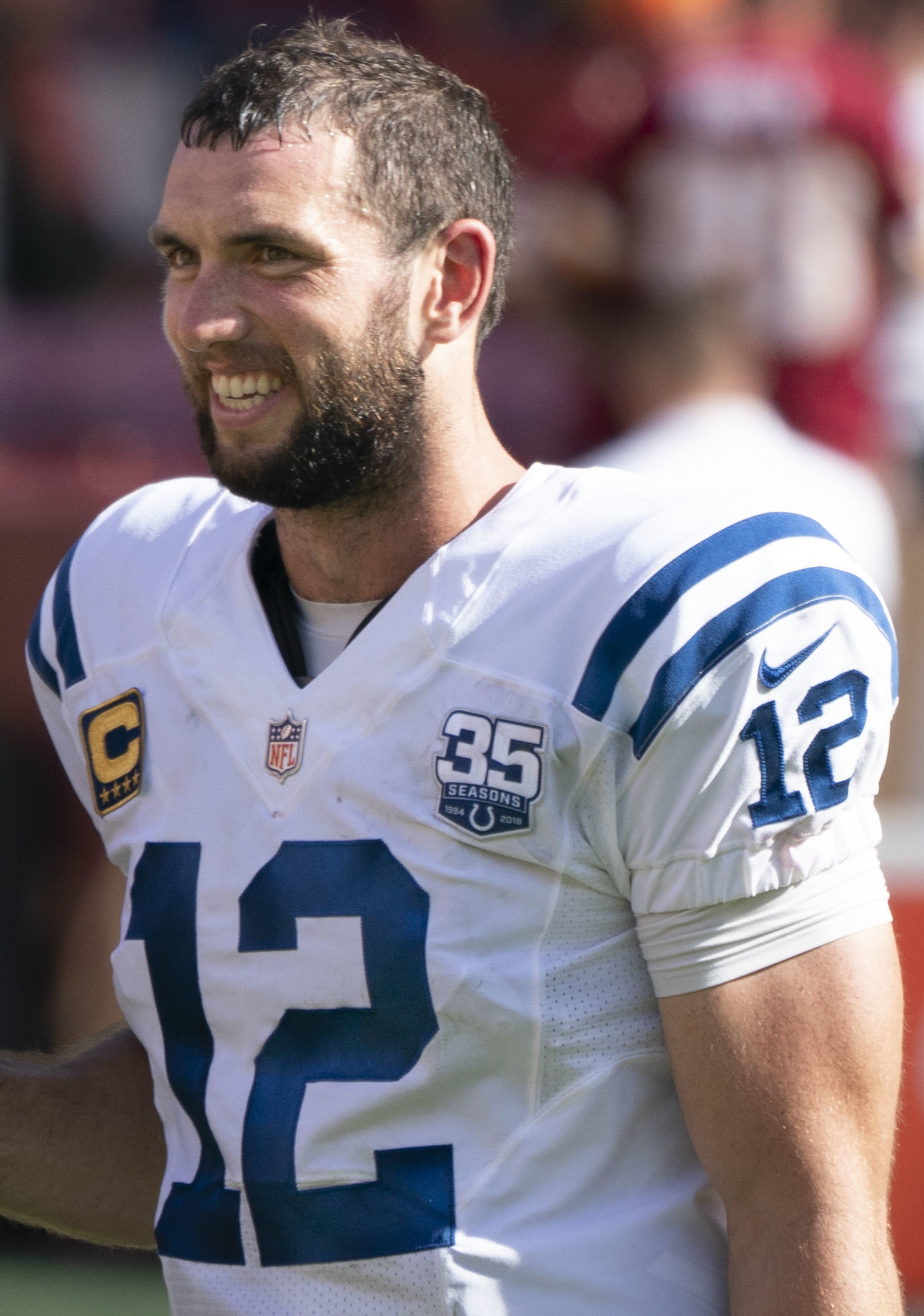
- Luck with the Indianapolis Colts in 2018

Stanford Cardinal
- Title: General manager

Personal information
- Born: September 12, 1989 (age 37); Washington, D.C., U.S.
- Listed height: 6 ft 4 in (1.93 m)
- Listed weight: 240 lb (109 kg)

Career information
- Position: Quarterback (No. 12)
- High school: Stratford (Houston, Texas)
- College: Stanford (2008–2011)
- NFL draft: 2012: 1st round, 1st overall pick

Career history

Playing
- Indianapolis Colts (2012–2018)

Coaching
- Palo Alto HS (CA) (2023–2024) Assistant coach

Operations
- Stanford (2024–present) General manager

Awards and highlights
- NFL Comeback Player of the Year (2018); 4× Pro Bowl (2012–2014, 2018); NFL passing touchdowns leader (2014); Maxwell Award (2011); Walter Camp Award (2011); Johnny Unitas Golden Arm Award (2011); First-team All-American (2011); Second-team All-American (2010); 2× Pac-12 Offensive Player of the Year (2010, 2011); 2× First-team All-Pac-12 (2010, 2011); NFL records: Most passing yards in a rookie season: 4,374; Most pass attempts per game (career): 38.3

Career NFL statistics
- Passing attempts: 3,290
- Passing completions: 2,000
- Completion percentage: 60.8%
- TD–INT: 171–83
- Passing yards: 23,671
- Passer rating: 89.5
- Rushing yards: 1,590
- Rushing touchdowns: 14
- Stats at Pro Football Reference
- College Football Hall of Fame

Andrew Austen Luck (born September 12, 1989) is an American football executive and former professional quarterback who is the general manager of the Stanford Cardinal. He previously played in the National Football League (NFL) for seven seasons with the Indianapolis Colts. Considered one of the best draft prospects during his college football career with Stanford, Luck won the Maxwell, Walter Camp, and Johnny Unitas Golden Arm awards in 2011. He was selected by the Colts first overall in the 2012 NFL draft.

In his first year, Luck set the rookie records for most passing yards in a season and game while leading a team that went 2–14 the previous year to an 11–5 record and playoff berth. Luck led the Colts to consecutive division titles in his next two seasons. In the postseason, Luck oversaw the NFL's second-largest playoff comeback during the 2013 playoffs and helped the Colts reach the 2014 AFC Championship Game. He earned Pro Bowl honors during his first three years and led the league in passing touchdowns in 2014.

Over the next three seasons, Luck struggled with injuries that caused him to miss the entire 2017 season. He returned to form the following year by setting several career highs and bringing the Colts back to the playoffs. For his success, Luck was named Comeback Player of the Year and voted to a fourth Pro Bowl. However, citing the injuries he sustained, Luck retired ahead of the 2019 season. In 2024, he returned to Stanford as the Cardinal's general manager. He was inducted to the College Football Hall of Fame in 2022.

== Early life and family ==
Luck was born on September 12, 1989, in Washington, D.C., to Kathy (née Wilson) and Oliver Luck, who was the commissioner of the XFL, former executive vice president for regulatory affairs at the NCAA, former quarterback (as well as athletic director) at West Virginia University, and a former NFL quarterback for the Houston Oilers. Luck was raised as a Catholic and was involved in his church's youth group.

Oliver Luck was general manager of two World League of American Football teams before becoming president of the league, so Andrew spent his early childhood in London, England and Frankfurt, Germany, where he attended Frankfurt International School. He is the oldest of four children, including sisters Mary Ellen and Emily and brother Addison. Mary Ellen is a Stanford graduate who played volleyball there, Emily also graduated from Stanford, and Addison attended Yale, where he played soccer. In London, Andrew attended The American School in London. As a result of his childhood in London, he is a fan of soccer. Although supporters of London clubs Arsenal and Tottenham have reached out to him believing he was a fellow fan, Luck said, "I try to support as many of the American fellows playing [in the Premier League] as possible." Luck said the Houston Dynamo was the "number one team in my heart" because his father was the club's founding president and general manager.

The Lucks returned to Texas when Oliver Luck was named CEO of the Harris County-Houston Sports Authority. In Houston, Andrew attended Stratford High School, where he threw for 7,139 yards and 53 touchdowns in his high school career, and rushed for another 2,085 yards. Luck was also co-valedictorian of his graduating class in 2008. Regarded as a four-star recruit by Rivals.com, Luck was listed as the No. 4 pro-style quarterback in the class of 2008. He played in the 2008 U.S. Army All-American Bowl. A highly rated high school recruiting target, he chose Stanford over offers from Northwestern, Oklahoma State, Purdue, Rice, and Virginia, after being recruited by Stanford head coach Jim Harbaugh.

College recruiting
Name	Hometown	School	Height	Weight	40^{‡}	Commit date
Andrew Luck; QB	Houston, Texas	Stratford HS	6 ft 4 in (1.93 m)	210 lb (95 kg)	4.7	Jun 30, 2007
Andrew Luck; QB	Recruit ratings: Scout: Rivals: 247Sports: (82)					
Overall recruit ranking: Scout: 4 (QB) Rivals: 5 (QB) ESPN: 7 (QB)
Note: In many cases, Scout, Rivals, 247Sports, On3, and ESPN may conflict in their listings of height and weight.; In these cases, the average was taken. ESPN grades are on a 100-point scale.; Sources: "Stanford Football Commitments". Rivals.; "2008 Stanford Football Commits". Scout.; "ESPN". ESPN.; "Scout.com Team Recruiting Rankings". Scout.; "2008 Team Ranking". Rivals.com.

== College career ==
After accepting an athletic scholarship to attend Stanford University, Luck played for coaches Jim Harbaugh and David Shaw with the Cardinal from 2008 to 2011.

=== 2009 season ===
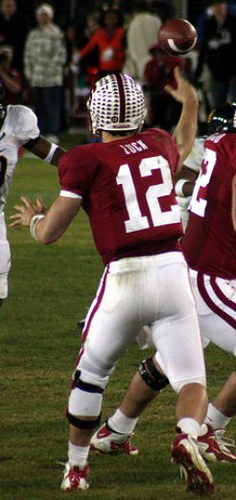
Luck at the Big Game against Cal in 2009

After redshirting during his freshman year in 2008, he earned the starting quarterback job in 2009 over the returning starter, Tavita Pritchard, thereby becoming the first Stanford freshman to earn the starting quarterback job since Chad Hutchinson in 1996. In his first season, Luck led the Cardinal to victories over top-10 Oregon and USC teams and a berth in the 2009 Sun Bowl. Playing in a run-oriented offense featuring Heisman Trophy runner-up Toby Gerhart, Luck threw for 2,575 yards. Luck had 2,929 yards of total offense, the fifth-highest total in Stanford history. He led the Pac-10 in pass efficiency rating with a rating of 143.5, and finished second in the Pac-10 in total offense.

Luck injured a finger on his throwing hand in the Cardinal's final regular season game against Notre Dame. He had surgery prior to the Sun Bowl and did not play in the game.

=== 2010 season ===
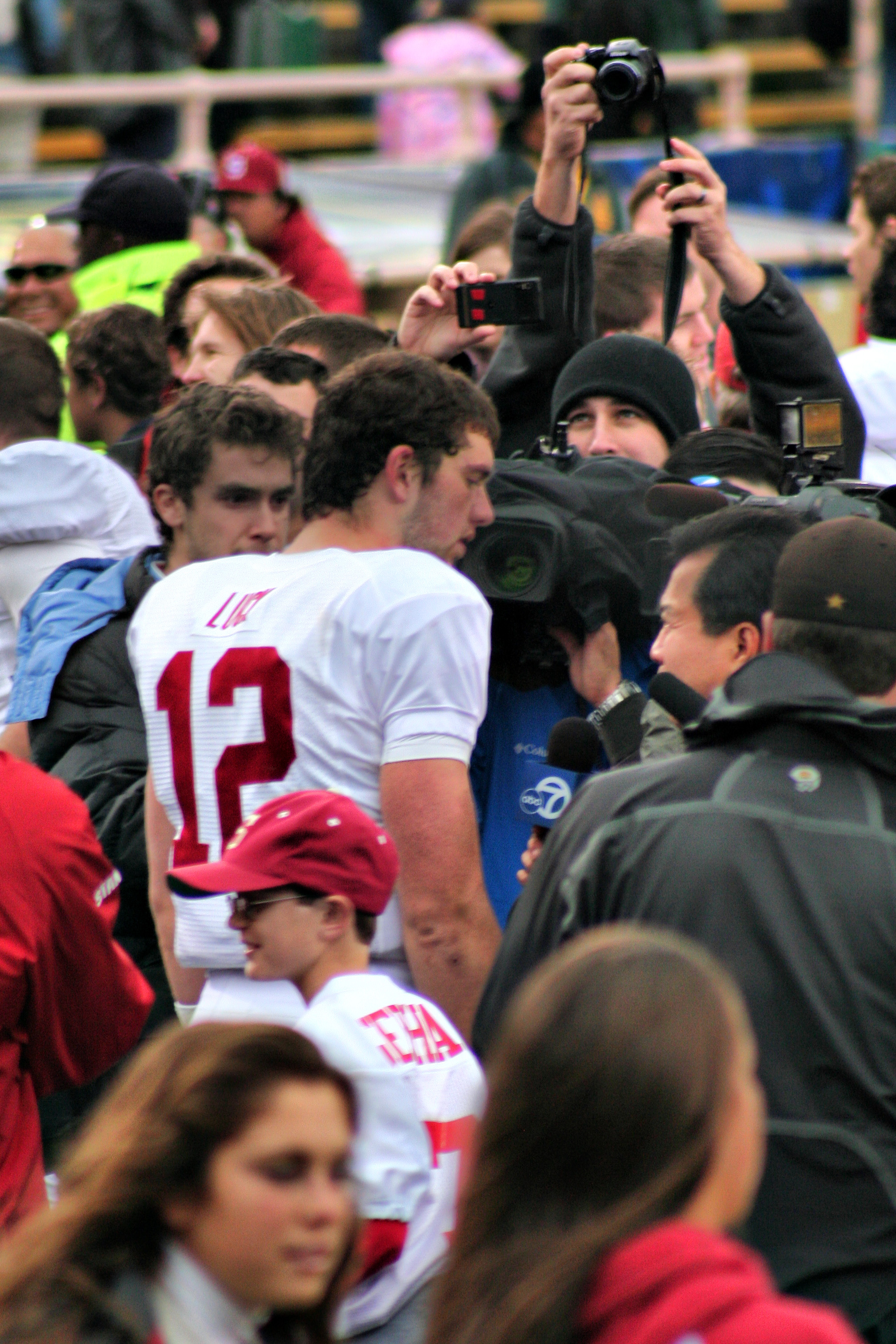
Luck after the Big Game between Stanford and Cal in 2010

In 2010, Luck emerged as one of the top players in the nation. Luck was named the Pac-10 Offensive Player of the Year and was unanimously selected to the All-Pac-10 First Team. Luck led Stanford to a 12–1 record, a #4 ranking in the final AP Poll, and a victory in the Orange Bowl. Luck was named the Orange Bowl MVP after throwing four touchdown passes in Stanford's 40–12 win over Virginia Tech. Luck led the Pac-10 in pass efficiency for the second straight year with a quarterback rating of 170.2. He also led the conference in total offense with 3,791 yards, in passing yards with 3,338 yards, and in touchdown passes with 32. Luck rushed for 453 yards, a record for Stanford quarterbacks, with three runs of over 50 yards. Luck's 32 touchdown passes are a new Stanford record, breaking the old record of 27 held by John Elway and Steve Stenstrom. Luck's 3,791 yards of total offense also are a school record, breaking the old record of 3,398 yards held by Stenstrom. Luck also set new Stanford single-season records for completion percentage (70.7%) and pass efficiency rating (170.2). He won the Pac-10 Offensive Player of the Week award for his performances against Arizona and California.

Luck finished the 2010 season with two years of college eligibility remaining. He was eligible to declare for the 2011 NFL draft, but announced on January 6, 2011, that he would remain at Stanford to complete his degree. He was viewed by many TV sportscasters and ESPN writers as the top pro quarterback prospect in college football. In December 2010, Sporting News projected Luck as the No. 1 selection in the 2011 NFL Draft, had he entered.

=== 2011 season ===
In 2011, Luck led Stanford to a record of 11–2, a berth in a BCS bowl, the 2012 Fiesta Bowl against Oklahoma State, and a #7 ranking in the final AP Poll. He won the Maxwell Award and the Walter Camp Player of the Year Award. He was the runner-up for the Heisman Trophy for the second consecutive year, becoming the fourth player to finish second in the Heisman voting twice. He was named a First Team All America (AFCA, Walter Camp, ESPN.com, Pro Football Weekly). He was the Pac-12 Offensive Player of the Year, becoming only the fifth player to win that award twice (after John Elway, Charles White, Reggie Bush, and Rueben Mayes). He was named First Team All-Pac-12 for the second straight year. Luck set a new Stanford record for career touchdown passes with 82, breaking John Elway's record of 77. Luck also set a new school record for touchdown passes in a season with 37, breaking his own record of 32. Luck set another school record for career total offense with 10,387 yards, breaking Steve Stenstrom's mark of 9,825 yards. Luck became Stanford's all-time leader in wins by a starting quarterback, with 31 wins through the end of the regular season. Luck also became Stanford's all-time leader in winning percentage by a starting quarterback, with a winning percentage of .816 (31–7). Luck broke the Pac-12 records for career passing efficiency rating (162.8) and career completion percentage (67.0%). He also broke his own Pac-12 record for highest completion percentage in a season (71.3%). Luck was named Pac-12 Offensive Player of the Week for his performance against Washington State. He earned the 2011 Academic All-America of the Year award.

=== Legacy ===
- Stanford had never won more than 10 games in a season (three times, twice before WWII) until it won 12 with Luck as its quarterback in 2010.
- Its best 2-year win total had been 18 wins (four times, last in 1991–92); it won 23 with Luck in 2010–2011.
- When Luck arrived, Stanford had spent only three weeks in the AP top ten since 1971. It spent 24 weeks in the top ten in 2010 and 2011.
- Stanford earned its first-ever BCS bowl berth in 2010, and a second in 2011.

In 2012, an anonymous donor endowed a permanent chair for Stanford's offensive coordinator position to be known as the "Andrew Luck Director of Offense."

Luck was announced as a 2022 inductee of the College Football Hall of Fame on January 10. He was inducted into the Stanford Athletics Hall of Fame in 2023.

== Professional career ==
=== Pre-draft ===
In September 2010, before Luck's sophomore season, Sports Illustrated's Tony Pauline considered him "the most NFL-ready of all the draft-eligible quarterback prospects." After a stellar sophomore year, Luck was widely projected to be the No. 1 pick in the 2011 NFL draft, but decided to return for his junior year. In May 2011, he was unanimously projected as the top prospect for the 2012 NFL draft. By midseason, Pauline described him as "the best quarterback since Peyton Manning" in 1998, while ESPN's Mel Kiper Jr. went even further, calling Luck the best quarterback prospect since John Elway in 1983. Despite Robert Griffin III's impressive Heisman Trophy-winning season, Luck's status as the No. 1 draft prospect was never questioned.

Throughout the 2011 NFL season, some fans called for their teams to try to lose their remaining games (or "Suck for Luck") in order to improve their chances at the first pick in the draft. By midseason the Miami Dolphins were believed to be the "frontrunners" for the No. 1 pick and drew criticism from their former franchise quarterback Dan Marino. The Indianapolis Colts, who were without starting quarterback Peyton Manning, won the "Luck sweepstakes" with a 2–14 record.

Ending speculations on April 24, Colts general manager Ryan Grigson announced the team would take Luck as the first pick. The decision became official on draft day, April 26, 2012. Luck was the fourth Stanford quarterback to be selected first, after Bobby Garrett in 1954, Jim Plunkett in 1971, and Elway in 1983. Luck was also the second Stanford quarterback taken first by the Colts after Elway, although Elway did not play for the Colts.

Pre-draft measurables
Height	Weight	Arm length	Hand span	Wingspan	40-yard dash	10-yard split	20-yard split	20-yard shuttle	Three-cone drill	Vertical jump	Broad jump	Wonderlic
6 ft 4 in (1.93 m)	234 lb (106 kg)	32 5/8 in (0.83 m)	10 in (0.25 m)	6 ft 5 7/8 in (1.98 m)	4.67 s	1.65 s	2.75 s	4.28 s	6.80 s	36.0 in (0.91 m)	10 ft 4 in (3.15 m)	37
All values from NFL Combine

=== 2012 season ===
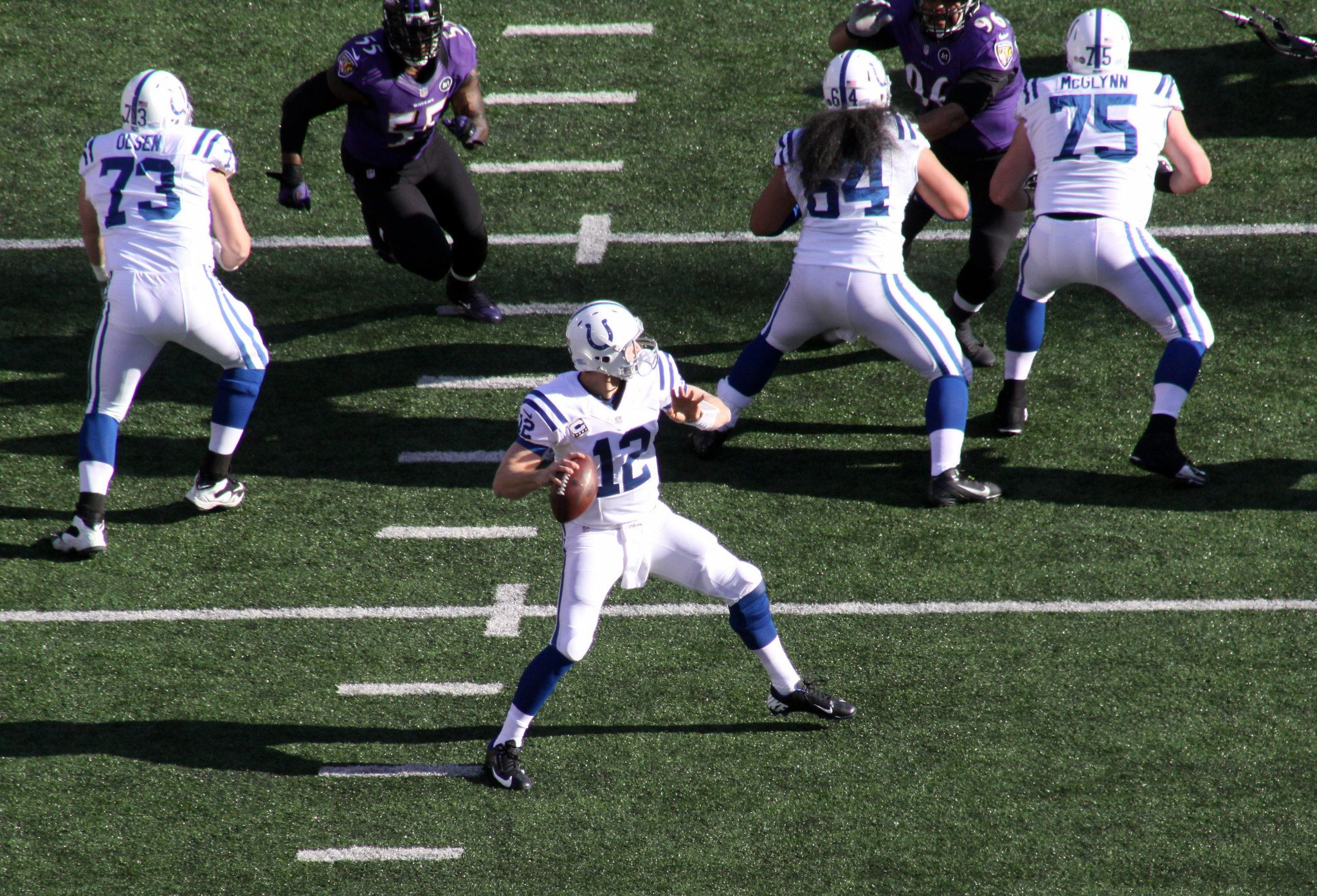
Luck vs. the Ravens during a Wild Card playoff game on January 6, 2013

On July 19, 2012, Luck signed a four-year contract with the Indianapolis Colts worth $22 million. The deal made Luck the fourth starting quarterback for the Colts in the past two NFL seasons, following Kerry Collins, Curtis Painter, and Dan Orlovsky. In his debut, a preseason game against the St. Louis Rams, Luck's first pass was a 63-yard touchdown to running back Donald Brown. He also threw a touchdown pass to receiver Austin Collie. In his second preseason game, a 26–24 loss to the Pittsburgh Steelers, Luck played the first half and ran for one touchdown, with two interceptions.

In his regular-season debut, Luck threw his first career interception to Chicago Bears cornerback Tim Jennings and his first career touchdown pass to Donnie Avery. Ultimately, Luck completed 23 of 45 passes for 309 yards, a touchdown, and three interceptions, as the Colts lost 41–21. The next week against the Minnesota Vikings, Luck threw for 224 yards, two touchdowns, and no interceptions. He got his first career win and did it by completing the first game-winning drive of his professional career. Luck won his first career road and overtime game during a week 8 game against the division rival Tennessee Titans. A touchdown pass to running back Vick Ballard on the first drive of overtime gave the Colts a 19–13 victory. In a Week 9 win against the Miami Dolphins, Luck threw for 433 yards, a then record for most yards in a game by a rookie quarterback (surpassing Cam Newton's 432 against the Green Bay Packers in 2011). He later sent his jersey from the Dolphins game to the Pro Football Hall of Fame. Through Week 9, Luck had thrown for the same number of yards as his predecessor, Peyton Manning. In Week 13 against the Detroit Lions, Luck and the Colts were trailing 33–21 with 2:39 left. After throwing a touchdown to fellow rookie LaVon Brazill, Luck and the Colts were able to get the ball back to the Lions' 14-yard line, facing a 4th down with four seconds left. Luck then threw a screen pass to Donnie Avery, who got free and ran in for the winning score, a big moment in Luck's early career. The win gave Luck his eighth of the season—the most wins by a rookie quarterback drafted first in NFL history—as well as his fifth game-winning drive on the season, tying Vince Young and Ben Roethlisberger for the most by a rookie quarterback.

Starting every game, Luck led the Colts to 11 wins—a record for rookie quarterbacks drafted first, where the previous record was 8—and reached the playoffs with a team that had gone 2–14 the year before. Playing against the Kansas City Chiefs on December 23, 2012, Luck broke the record for most passing yards in a season by a rookie, throwing 205 to bring his season total to 4,183. Cam Newton held the previous record with 4,051 yards.

=== 2013 season ===
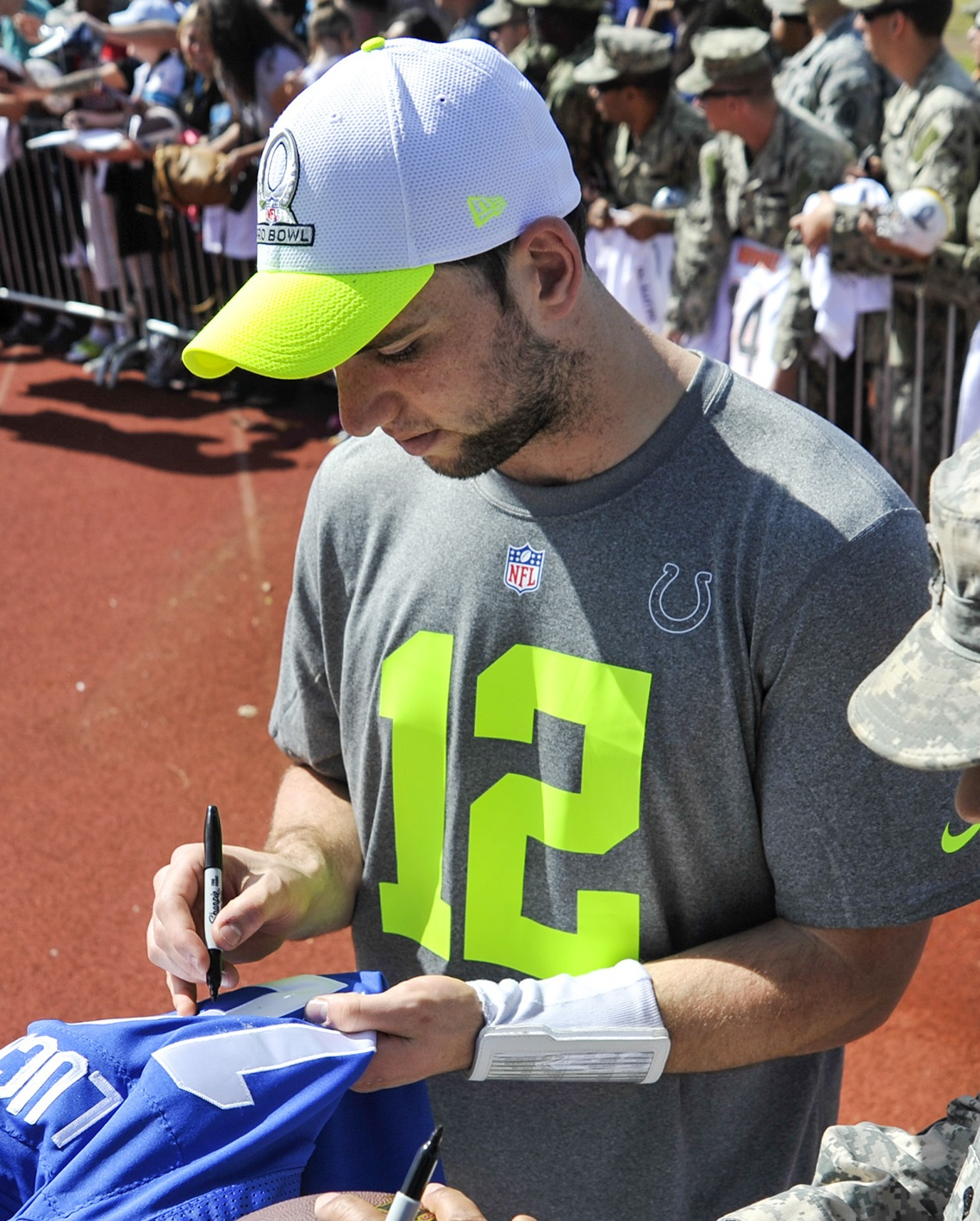
Luck signing autographs for fans at the 2013 Pro Bowl

In 2013, Luck was reunited with offensive coordinator Pep Hamilton, who was his offensive coordinator and quarterback coach at Stanford. In week 1 against the Oakland Raiders, Luck capped off another comeback win by scoring a 20-yard rushing touchdown in a 21–17 win. After a Week 2 loss to the Miami Dolphins, Luck defeated his former Stanford coach Jim Harbaugh in a 27–7 win against the San Francisco 49ers in Week 3. After falling behind early to the Jacksonville Jaguars in Week 4, Luck and the Colts scored 37 unanswered points to win 37–3. The win gave Luck a 14–6 record through his first 20 games, tying him with John Elway for the best record through 20 games for a quarterback selected first.

On October 6, Luck led the Colts to a 34–28 win over the then-undefeated Seattle Seahawks in his first game against fellow sophomore quarterback Russell Wilson. Luck also recorded his ninth career fourth-quarter comeback in the win, handing Seattle their first regular-season loss since November 25, 2012. The Colts traveled to San Diego to face the Chargers for a Week 6 Monday Night Football match, the first of Luck's career. Indianapolis was dominated in time of possession and lost 19–9. In week 7, Peyton Manning made his return to Lucas Oil Stadium to face Luck on NBC Sunday Night Football. The Colts led at halftime 26–14 and survived a near comeback by the previously undefeated Denver Broncos to win 39–33, going into a bye week. The win also snapped Denver's 17-game regular-season winning streak. Luck won his second AFC Offensive Player of the Week for his performance against the Broncos, going 21–38 for 228 yards with 3 touchdown passes, 1 rushing touchdown, and no interceptions. After a Week 8 bye, Luck engineered his tenth career fourth-quarter comeback, scoring 15 points in the quarter to defeat the Houston Texans by a score of 27–24. He threw three touchdowns, all to fellow sophomore Colt T. Y. Hilton, and finished with 271 passing yards and no interceptions. During Week 14, the Colts won their first division championship under Luck and were the first team to clinch their division that season. The next week, Luck threw for 2 touchdowns in a 25–3 victory over the Houston Texans in their second divisional matchup.

During a Week 16 23–7 victory over the Kansas City Chiefs, Luck threw for 241 yards and a touchdown. In doing so, he passed Peyton Manning for second place for quarterback passing yards through 2 seasons with 7,914 (Manning had 7,874 in his first 2 seasons). In week 17, Luck broke Cam Newton's record for yards passing in the first two seasons of a career, with 8,196 yards (Newton had 7,920 yards) in a win against the Jacksonville Jaguars.

Luck played his first NFL home playoff game on January 4, 2014, against the fifth-seeded Kansas City Chiefs in the Wild Card Round. After the Colts fell back by 28 points, he led a historic comeback, capping the game with a 64-yard touchdown pass to T. Y. Hilton to take the lead for the first time, 45–44. The Colts defense would then deny Alex Smith a chance to get Kansas City within field goal range to end the game. Luck completed 29 passes for 433 yards and 4 touchdowns, in addition to recovering a fumble for a key touchdown, to record the second-biggest comeback in NFL playoff history and the largest comeback to end in regulation. That game was ranked #1 on NFL.com's Top Games of 2013. The Colts lost to the New England Patriots 43–22 in the Divisional Round of the playoffs the following week. Luck threw for 331 yards, two touchdowns, and four interceptions.

Luck was named to his second Pro Bowl on January 19, 2014, replacing Russell Wilson due to Wilson's participation in Super Bowl XLVIII. He went on to be taken first by Deion Sanders. He was ranked 30th by his fellow players on the NFL Top 100 Players of 2014.

=== 2014 season ===
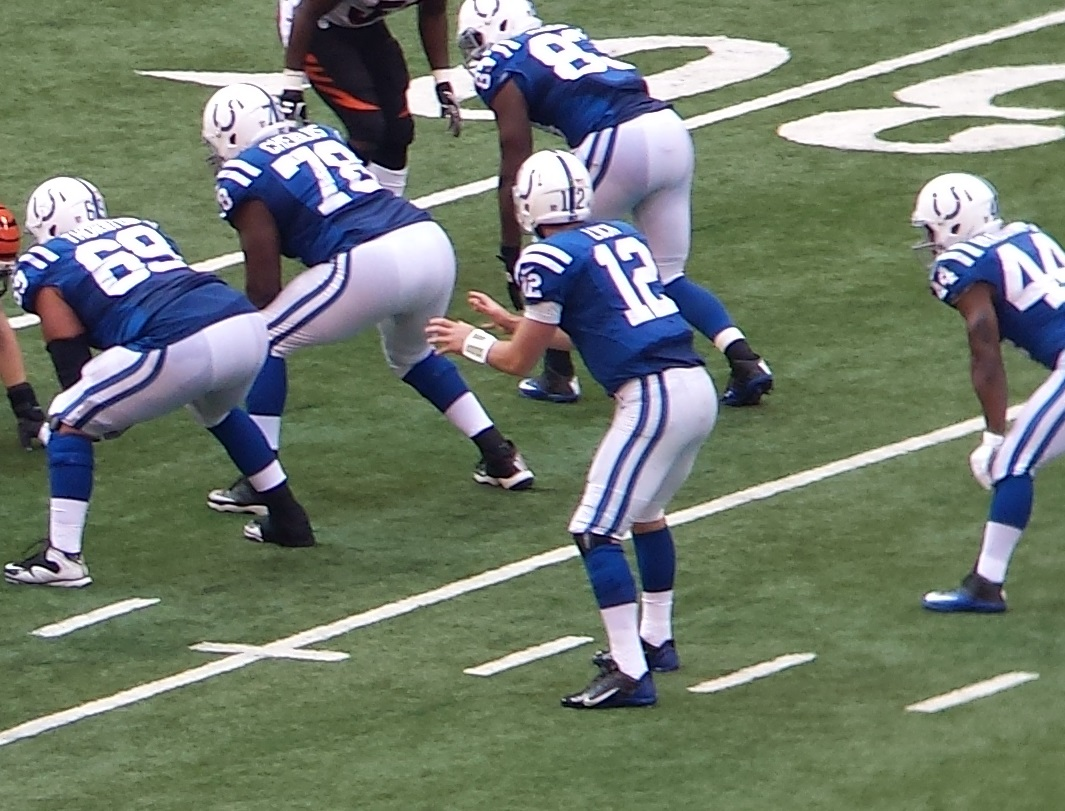
Luck vs. the Bengals in 2014

Opening the season with his second game against his predecessor, Peyton Manning, Luck passed for 370 yards, 2 touchdowns, and 2 interceptions. After rallying from a 24–0 deficit following halftime, the Colts fell short of the comeback and lost to the Denver Broncos 31–24. In a Week 2 loss against the Philadelphia Eagles, Luck threw for 3 touchdowns, passing Jim Harbaugh for fourth on the Colts' all-time list. Looking to avoid losing three consecutive games for the first time in his career, Luck completed 31 of 39 passes for 370 yards and 4 touchdowns against the Jacksonville Jaguars to win 44–17 in Week 3. He was named the AFC Offensive Player of the Week for his performance, the third time he won the award.

In a Week 4 win against the Tennessee Titans, Luck became the first quarterback in NFL history to throw for 370 yards or more, 4 touchdowns, and have a completion percentage 70 percent or above in consecutive games. He would continue his winning ways in Week 5 against the Baltimore Ravens, throwing 312 yards with a touchdown pass, as well as a rushing touchdown, to win 20–13. Luck would record his fourth-consecutive 300 yard game against the Houston Texans. Indianapolis jumped out to a 24–0 lead after 1 quarter, and would hold on to beat the Texans 33–28. Through Week 6, Luck had thrown for 1,987 yards and 17 touchdowns, leading the league in both, and establishing career-highs through 6 games.

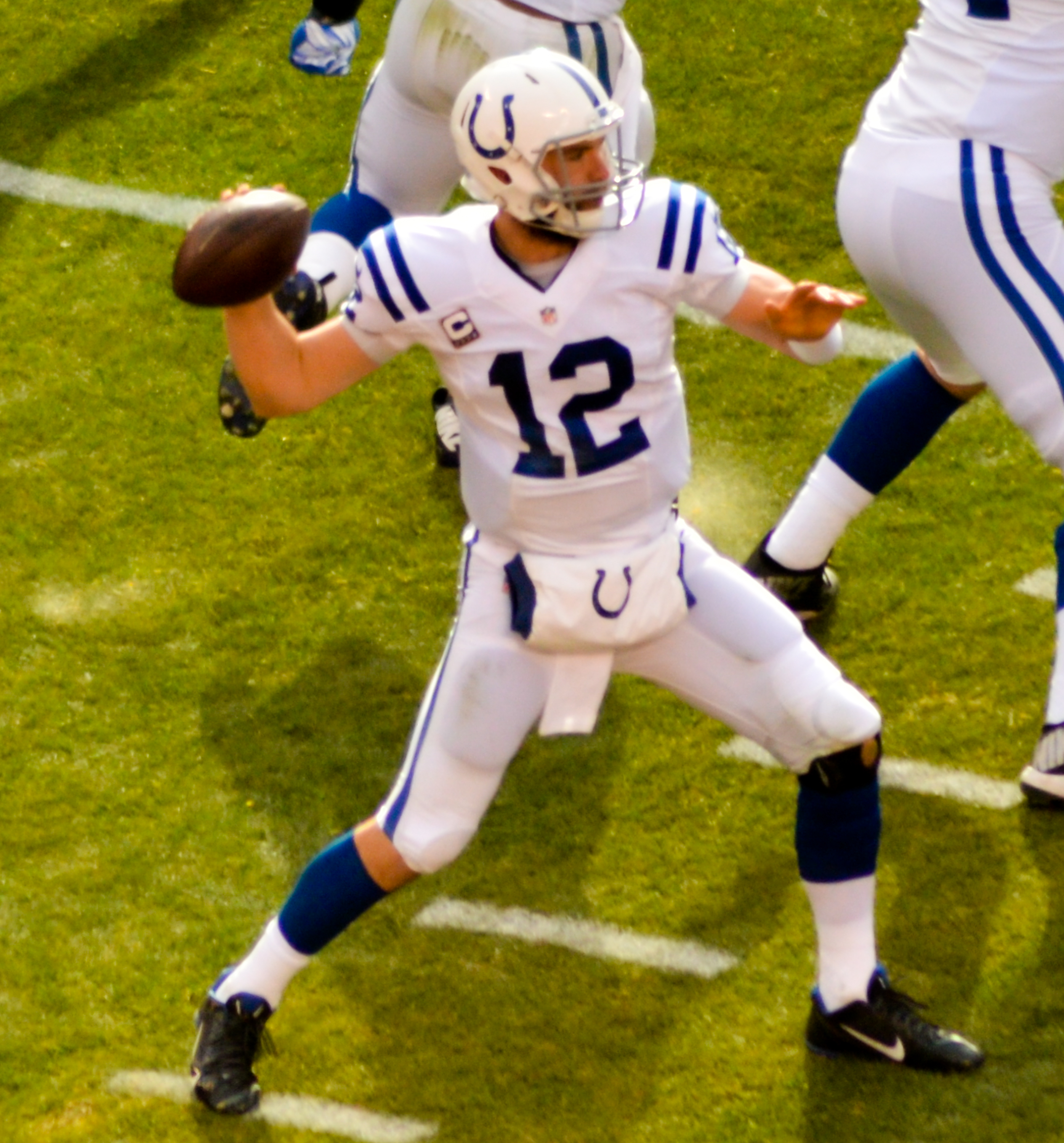
Luck about to throw a pass vs. the Browns in 2014

Luck continued his excellent play in Week 7 against the Cincinnati Bengals, passing for over 300 yards for the 5th consecutive game, tying the Colts record set by Peyton Manning. He would finish the day with 344 passing yards and 2 touchdowns, as Indianapolis defeated the Bengals, 27–0. The shutout victory was the first for Indianapolis since a 23–0 win over the Tennessee Titans in December 2008. Luck broke his single-season touchdown mark in the Colts Week 9 game against the New York Giants, throwing four to bring his total to 26. He also became the first quarterback in 2014 to reach 3,000 passing yards.

In Week 13, Luck threw a career-high 5 touchdown passes in a 49–27 win over the Washington Redskins. In addition, he also became the first quarterback to reach 4,000 passing yards in 2014. On December 4, Luck was named the AFC Offensive Player of the Month for November. In the month, Luck passed for 1,280 yards, 12 touchdowns, and had a quarterback rating of 112.0. Entering a Week 14 matchup with the Cleveland Browns, Luck needed only 81 yards to surpass Peyton Manning for the most passing yards by a quarterback in their first 3 seasons. Luck passed for 294 yards to take the record, and engineered a fourth-quarter comeback by throwing a 1-yard touchdown pass to T. Y. Hilton to win the game 25–24.

After a Week 15 win against the Texans, Luck successfully led the Colts to the playoffs for the third straight year. Along with the division title, Luck also earned his third straight Pro Bowl berth. In Week 17, Luck broke Peyton Manning's franchise record for passing yards in a single-season. In addition, he became the 8th quarterback in NFL history to throw for 40 or more touchdowns in a single season. In the Colts' Wild Card Round game against the Cincinnati Bengals, Luck completed 31 of 44 passes for 376 yards and a touchdown, leading the team to a 26–10 victory. He then went on to complete 27 of 43 passes and throw for 265 yards, 2 touchdowns, and 2 interceptions in a 24–13 victory over the Denver Broncos in the AFC Divisional Round. In the AFC Championship, infamously dubbed Deflategate, Luck and the Colts fell to the New England Patriots, 45–7. Luck was also the league's leader in passing touchdowns for the first time in his career. He was ranked seventh by his fellow players on the NFL Top 100 Players of 2015.

=== 2015 season ===
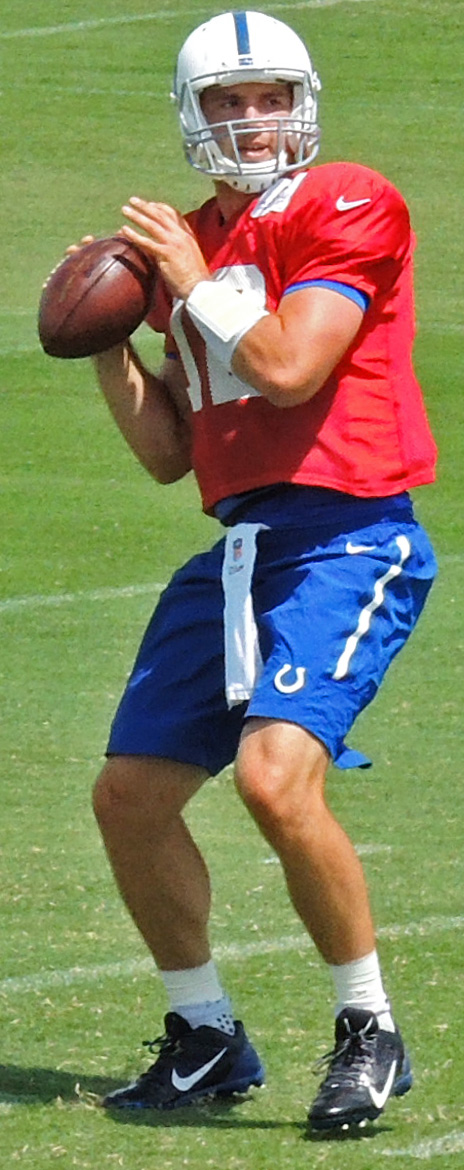
Luck in 2015 at training camp

On April 9, the Colts announced they had picked up the fifth-year option on Luck's contract, paying him a guaranteed $16.55 million in 2016. In Weeks 4 and 5, Luck missed the first two games of his career with an injured shoulder. Backup Matt Hasselbeck played in his place and led the team to a 16–13 overtime win over the Jacksonville Jaguars, followed by a 27–20 Thursday Night Football victory over the Houston Texans. Luck returned to the lineup on October 18 in a 34–27 loss to the New England Patriots. On November 2, Luck led the Colts back from a 17-point deficit in the fourth quarter to force overtime against the Carolina Panthers, but his third interception of the game helped lead to the Panthers' 29–26 win. On November 10, it was announced that Luck would miss 2–6 weeks with a lacerated kidney and partially torn abdominal muscle, suffered during the fourth quarter of the Colts 27–24 win over the previously undefeated Denver Broncos two days prior. However, the recovery process took much longer than expected and Luck did not return for the rest of the season. The Colts failed to make the playoffs for the first time with Luck, ending the season 8–8. He was ranked 92nd by his fellow players on the NFL Top 100 Players of 2016.

=== 2016 season ===
On June 29, the Colts announced Luck had signed a six-year extension worth $140 million, with $87 million guaranteed, making him the highest paid player in the league. In a 41–10 win over the New York Jets in Week 13, Luck passed for 278 yards and four touchdowns, which earned him the AFC Offensive Player of the Week award. In the 2016 season, Luck threw for 4,240 yards and 31 touchdowns, and a career-high 63.5 completion percentage, despite missing a game due to a concussion. He was also ranked 51st by his peers on the NFL Top 100 Players of 2017. Shortly following the 2016 season, Luck underwent surgery to repair an issue with his right (throwing) shoulder that had been lingering since 2015.

=== 2017 season: Lost season with shoulder injury ===
Following surgery on his shoulder during the off-season, Luck was held out of training camp and the preseason, and it was announced he was to miss regular season games. Scott Tolzien started for the season opener against the Los Angeles Rams, and the newly acquired Jacoby Brissett took over as the starter in Week 2 against the Arizona Cardinals. Following the Colts' Week 4 loss to the Seattle Seahawks, Colts' general manager Chris Ballard stated that Luck would begin practicing but was not ready to fully return to games. On November 2, the Colts placed Luck on injured reserve, meaning that he was ruled out for the 2017 season. On November 11, it was revealed that Luck was traveling to Europe to seek additional treatment for his previously injured shoulder. After returning to the U.S., Luck was put through a throwing program. This led him to travel to Los Angeles to go through rehab with a throwing coach. Ballard stated on February 7, 2018, that Luck would not need an additional surgery. The date is unclear, but there was a second injury to the shoulder during a snowboarding trip taken while still rehabbing from first surgery.

=== 2018 season: Final season ===
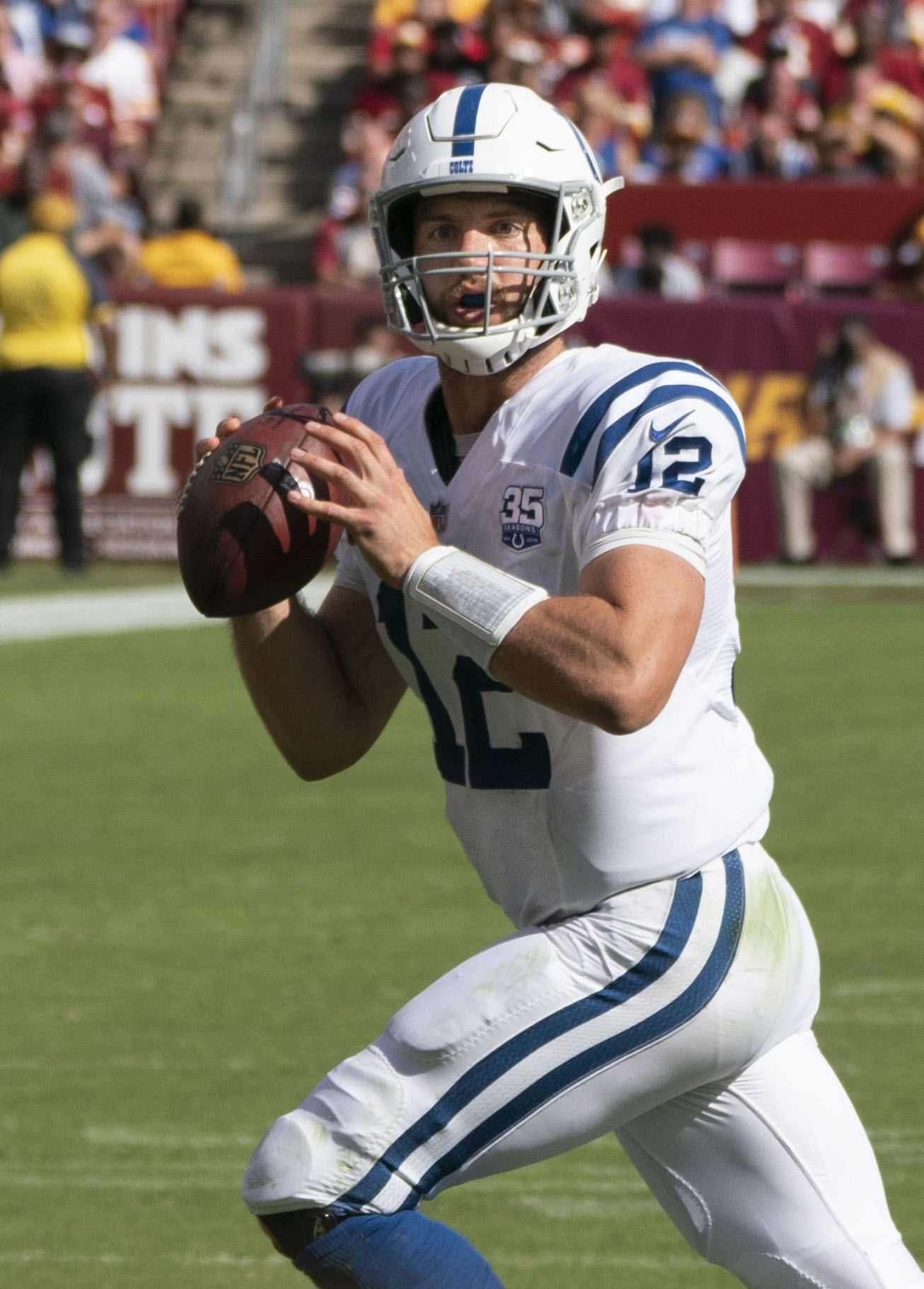
Luck passing against the Redskins in 2018

Luck started Week 1 on September 9, 2018, against the Cincinnati Bengals, his first game in 616 days. He had 319 passing yards, two touchdowns, and an interception, and set a career-high in completions with 39, but the Colts lost 34–23. In Week 3 against the Philadelphia Eagles, with the Colts down 20–16 with seconds left in the game, Luck, who threw for just 164 yards in the game, was replaced by backup Jacoby Brissett to attempt a Hail Mary pass from his own 46-yard line. Brissett overthrew several players in the back of the end zone and the Colts lost the game. The move was questioned by some journalists and fans, and led to some speculation about the health of Luck's shoulder, although head coach Frank Reich and Luck both said it was purely because Brissett had a stronger throwing arm. The following week against the Houston Texans, Luck threw for four touchdowns and career-highs in completions (40), attempts (62), and yards (464). He led the Colts back from down 28–10 in the third quarter, including a game-tying two point conversion with :51 left. However the team lost in overtime, 37–34, after Indianapolis failed to convert a 4th and 4 on their own 43 and the Texans kicked the game-winning field goal. In Week 5, on Thursday Night Football against the New England Patriots, he was 38-of-59 for 365 passing yards, three touchdowns, and two interceptions as the Colts fell 38–24. Luck's 121 passing attempts in Weeks 4–5 were the most over a two-game span in NFL history. In Week 6, against the New York Jets, he had 301 passing yards, four touchdowns, and three interceptions in the 42–34 loss.

After the 1–5 start to the season, Luck and the Colts went on a five-game winning streak. In Week 7, he passed for 156 yards and four touchdowns in a 37–5 victory over the Buffalo Bills. In the next two games, victories over the Oakland Raiders and Jacksonville Jaguars, he passed for three touchdowns in both games. In Week 11, Luck completed 23 of 29 passes for 297 yards and three touchdowns, posting a 143.8 passer rating, in a 38–10 win over the Titans, earning him AFC Offensive Player of the Week. In a Week 12 27–24 victory over the Miami Dolphins, Luck had his eighth consecutive game with at least three passing touchdowns. In Week 16, Luck led a double-digit comeback against the New York Giants, the 21st fourth quarter comeback of his career, throwing a go-ahead score to Chester Rogers with 55 seconds left, and winning 28–27. The win put the Colts in position for a chance to earn a Wild Card playoff berth the following week in their matchup with the Titans. Luck also set a new record in single-season completions in the game, passing his previous mark of 380 in 2014. The Colts defeated the Titans, earning a Wild Card berth and ending the season winning nine of ten games. Luck finished his first season back from injury with 4,593 passing yards, 39 touchdowns, and 15 interceptions. Luck and the Colts upset the AFC South division champion Houston Texans in the Wild Card Round by a score of 21–7. In the victory, Luck passed for 222 yards, two touchdowns, and one interception. In the Divisional Round, the Colts faced off against the AFC West champion Kansas City Chiefs. In what ended up being his final game, Luck passed for 203 yards and one touchdown, but the Colts fell to the Chiefs by a score of 31–13.

At the end of the season, Luck was named to the fourth Pro Bowl of his career, as well as being given the National Football League Comeback Player of the Year Award by the Pro Football Writers Association. He was ranked 20th by his fellow players on the NFL Top 100 Players of 2019.

=== Retirement ===
"To play quarterback, you're not allowed to worry about anything except the task at hand, and that seeps into other areas of life. It's not the healthiest way to live."

— Andrew Luck

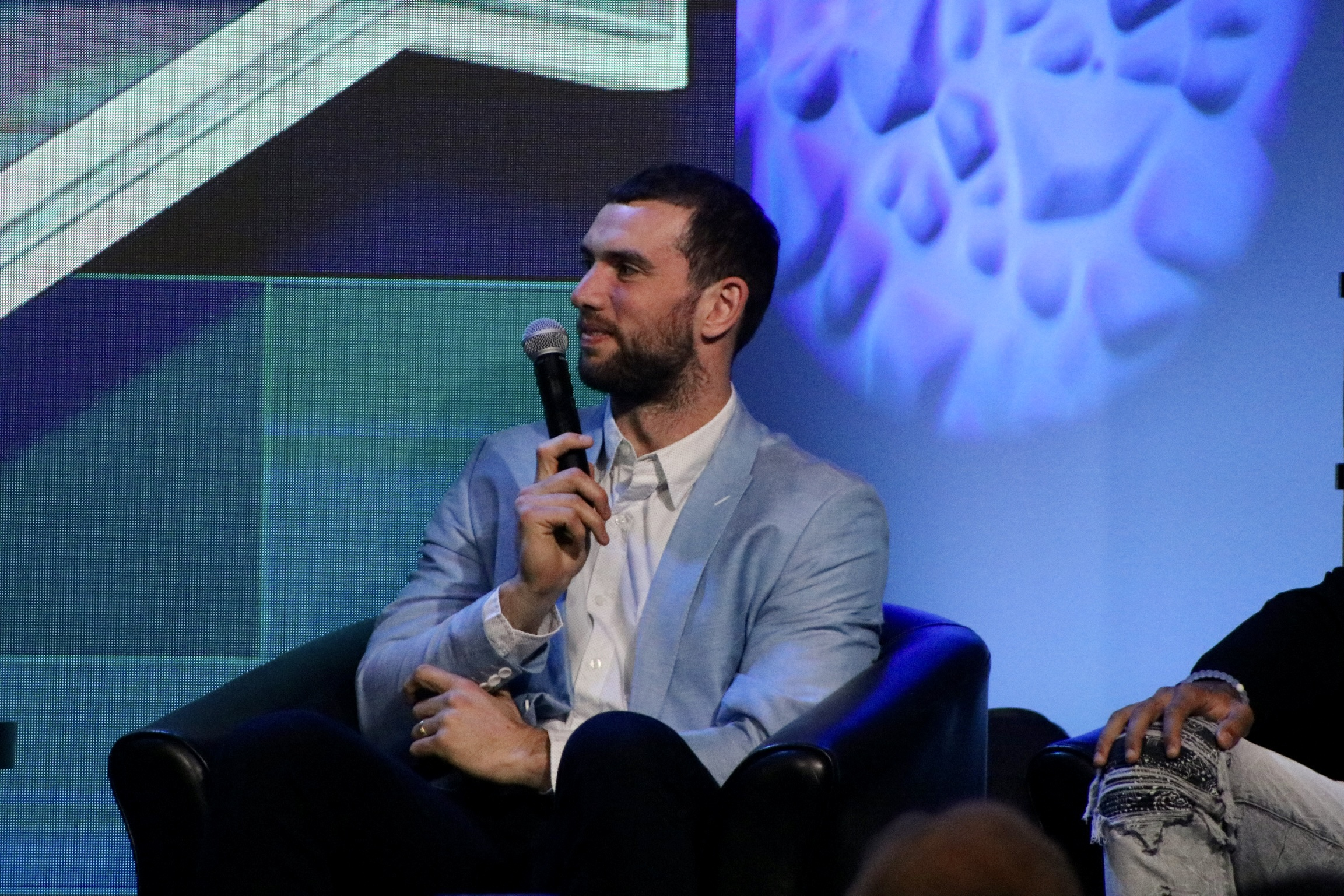
Luck speaking at a Colts fan event in May 2019.

On August 24, 2019, after seven seasons and at the age of 29, Luck announced his retirement two weeks before the start of the season. At a press conference, he cited his recurrent cycle of injuries and rehabilitation as the primary reason, saying:

I've been stuck in this process. I haven't been able to live the life I want to live. It's taken the joy out of this game. The only way forward for me is to remove myself from football. This is not an easy decision. It's the hardest decision of my life. But it is the right decision for me.

Due to retiring at the age of 29, Luck is considered by some to be among the best professional athletes to end their career during their prime.

After very few public appearances and no interviews following his retirement, an ESPN article written by Seth Wickersham in December 2022 went into more detail about Luck's decision. Luck clarified that while injuries played a role, another factor was a desire to save his relationship with his wife, Nicole. According to Luck, the development required to become a top tier NFL caliber quarterback caused friction with Nicole. He ultimately chose his marriage over his career.

== Career statistics ==
=== NFL ===
Legend
	Led the league
	NFL rookie record
**Bold**	Career high

==== Regular season ====
Year	Team	Games			Passing									Rushing					Sacked		Fumbles	
Year	Team	GP	GS	Record	Cmp	Att	Pct	Yds	Y/A	Lng	TD	Int	Rtg	Att	Yds	Y/A	Lng	TD	Sck	SckY	Fum	Lost
2012	IND	16	16	**11–5**	339	627	54.1	4,374	7.0	70	23	**18**	76.5	62	255	4.1	19	**5**	**41**	246	10	5
2013	IND	16	16	**11–5**	343	570	60.2	3,822	6.7	73	23	9	87.0	63	**377**	**6.0**	29	4	32	227	6	2
2014	IND	16	16	**11–5**	380	616	61.7	**4,761**	7.7	80	**40**	16	96.5	**64**	273	4.3	20	3	27	161	**13**	**6**
2015	IND	7	7	2–5	162	293	55.3	1,881	6.4	**87**	15	12	74.9	33	196	5.9	25	0	15	88	3	1
2016	IND	15	15	8–7	346	545	63.5	4,240	**7.8**	64	31	13	96.4	**64**	341	5.3	**33**	2	**41**	**268**	6	5
2017	IND	0	0	Did not play due to injury																		
2018	IND	16	16	10–6	**430**	**639**	**67.3**	4,593	7.2	68	39	15	**98.7**	46	148	3.2	**33**	0	18	134	6	1
Career		86	86	53–33	2,000	3,290	60.8	23,671	7.2	87	171	83	89.5	332	1,590	4.8	33	14	174	1,124	44	20

==== Postseason ====
Year	Team	Games			Passing									Rushing					Sacked		Fumbles	
Year	Team	GP	GS	Record	Cmp	Att	Pct	Yds	Y/A	Lng	TD	Int	Rtg	Att	Yds	Y/A	Lng	TD	Sck	SckY	Fum	Lost
2012	IND	1	1	0–1	28	54	51.9	288	5.3	26	0	1	59.8	4	35	**8.8**	18	0	3	21	**1**	**1**
2013	IND	2	2	1–1	49	86	57.0	**774**	**9.0**	**64**	**6**	**7**	76.4	8	50	6.3	**21**	0	**4**	21	0	0
2014	IND	3	3	**2–1**	**70**	**120**	**58.3**	767	6.4	45	3	4	71.8	8	**57**	6.5	20	0	1	8	0	0
2018	IND	2	2	1–1	38	68	55.9	425	6.3	38	3	1	**83.3**	**10**	46	4.6	10	0	3	**24**	**1**	**1**
Career		8	8	4–4	185	328	56.4	2,254	6.9	64	12	13	73.4	30	188	6.3	21	0	11	74	2	2

In the 2013 Wildcard Round, Luck recovered a teammate's fumble for a five-yard touchdown.

=== College ===
Season	Team	Passing							Rushing				
Season	Team	Cmp	Att	Pct	Yds	TD	Int	Rtg	Att	Yds	Avg	Lng	TD
2008	Stanford	Redshirt											
2009	Stanford	162	288	56.3	2,575	13	4	143.5	61	354	5.8	31	2
2010	Stanford	263	372	70.7	3,338	32	8	170.2	55	453	8.2	58	3
2011	Stanford	288	404	71.3	3,517	37	10	169.7	47	150	3.2	17	2
Career		713	1,064	67.0	9,430	82	22	162.8	163	957	5.9	58	7

== Career highlights ==
=== Awards and honors ===
NFL

- 4× Pro Bowl (2012, 2013, 2014, 2018)
- NFL passing touchdowns leader (2014)
- NFL Comeback Player of the Year (2018)
- 2× AFC Offensive Player of the Month (November 2014, November 2018)
- 5× AFC Offensive Player of the Week (Week 9, 2012; Week 7, 2013; Week 3, 2014; Week 13, 2016; Week 11, 2018)
- 3× Pepsi NFL Rookie of the Week (Week 3, 2012; Week 5, 2012; Week 8, 2012)
- 6× NFL Top 100 — 23rd (2013), 30th (2014), 7th (2015), 92nd (2016), 51st (2017), 20th (2019)

College

- First-team All American (AFCA, Walter Camp, ESPN.com, PFW)
- Second-team All-American (2010)
- Maxwell Award (2011)
- Walter Camp Player of the Year Award (2011)
- Johnny Unitas Golden Arm Award (2011)
- Heisman Trophy runner-up (2011)
- Davey O'Brien Award finalist (2011)
- Manning Award finalist (2011)
- Academic All-America of the Year (CoSIDA) (2011)
- 2× Pac-12 Offensive Player of the Year (2010, 2011)
- 2× First-team All-Pac-12 (2010, 2011)
- Pac-12 Offensive Player of the Week, October 17, 2011
- 2011 Orange Bowl MVP

=== Records ===
==== NFL records ====
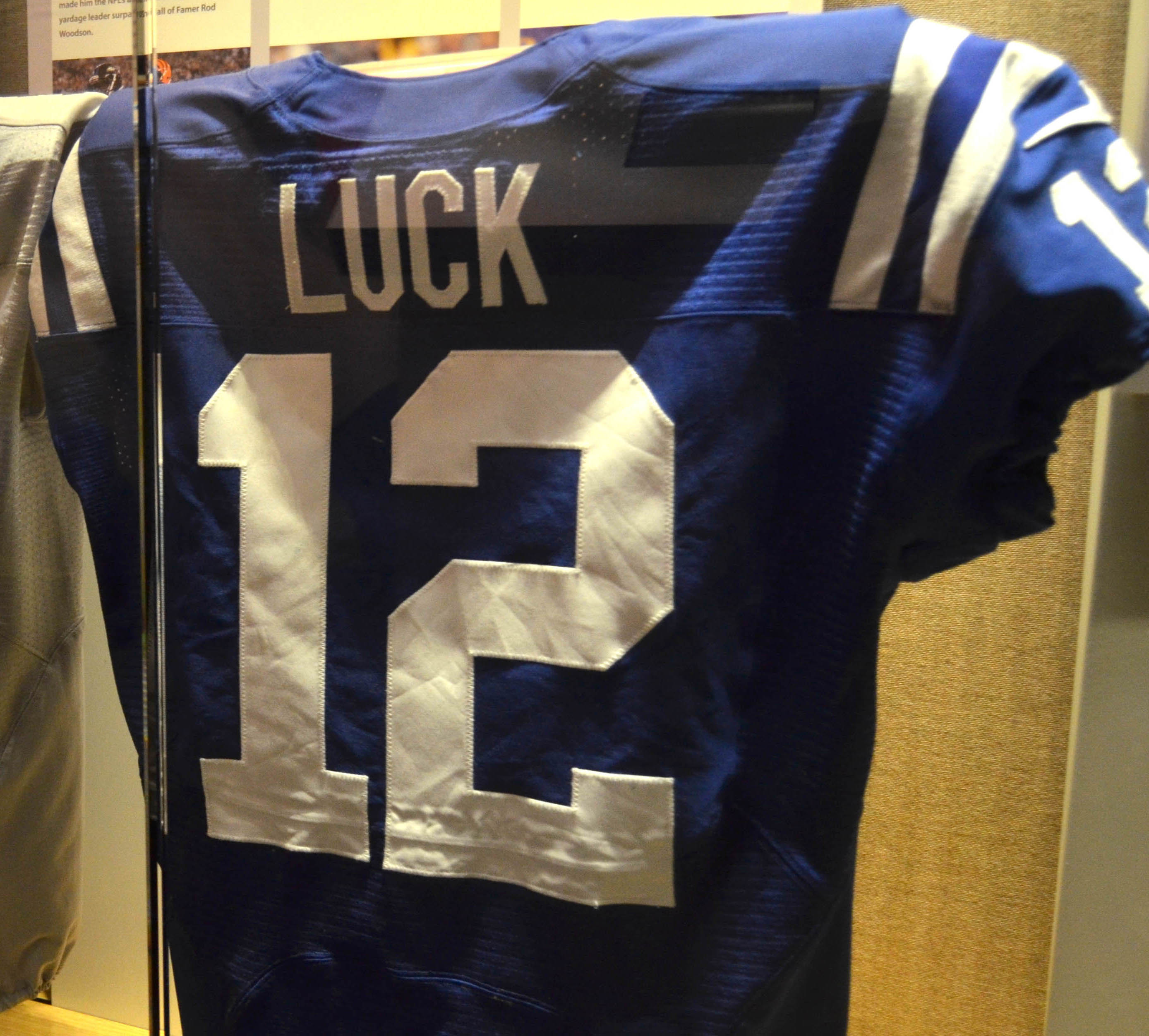
Luck's jersey exhibited at the Pro Football Hall of Fame

- Most pass attempts per game, career: 38.3
- Most passing yards by a rookie in a single season (4,374)
- Most pass attempts, rookie, season: 627, 2012
- Most game-winning drives by a rookie quarterback (7)
- Most passing yards for a quarterback through his first 5 postseason games (1,703)
- Most consecutive 350-yard passing games on the road (5)
- First quarterback to throw for more than 350 yards in five consecutive road games
- First quarterback to throw for 370 yards or more, 4 touchdowns, and have a completion percentage 70 percent or above in consecutive games
- Third player to throw for 3,000 yards in the first nine games, alongside Peyton Manning and Drew Brees (twice)

==== Colts franchise records ====
- Most passing yards in a single season (4,761, 2014)
- Most passing yards by a rookie quarterback in a single season (4,374)
- Most passing yards by a rookie quarterback in a single game (433)
- Most pass attempts by a rookie quarterback in a single season (627)
- Most pass completions by a rookie quarterback in a single season (339)
- Most pass completions by a rookie quarterback in a single game (31)
- Most passing touchdowns by a rookie quarterback in a single game (4)
- Highest passer rating by a rookie quarterback with a minimum of 100 attempts (76.5)
- Highest interception percentage by a rookie quarterback with a minimum of 100 attempts (2.87)

== Endorsements ==
In March 2012, Nike, Inc. signed Luck to its roster of athletes.

In September 2013, Luck became a partner and investor in BodyArmor SuperDrink.

== Administrative career ==
After returning to school and completing his master's degree, Luck became the general manager of Stanford Cardinal football in November 2024. As one of his first acts as GM, Luck fired head football coach Troy Taylor on March 25, 2025, after two investigations into the latter's conduct towards female staffers. Luck then brought in Frank Reich, who had coached him in Indianapolis in his final year in the NFL, to replace Taylor as Stanford's new coach on an interim basis.

The Cardinal went 4–8 in Luck's first full season as general manager, during which his focus was on developing the program for the long term and searching for a permanent head coach. The former included helping the team secure $100 million in fundraising during the year. After interviewing approximately 30 candidates, Stanford hired Luck's quarterback predecessor Tavita Pritchard as the new head coach in November 2025.

== Personal life ==
On June 17, 2012, Luck graduated from Stanford with a bachelor's degree in architectural design and received the Al Masters Award, an honor given to an athlete each year "for the highest standards of athletic performance, leadership and academic achievement."

He has stated that his favorite musician is Bruce Springsteen. An avid reader, Luck became known as "the Colts' very own librarian", giving and suggesting books for his teammates; in 2012, he said his favorite book was Henri Charrière's Papillon, and he is a fan of Bernard Cornwell's historical fiction.

On the field, Luck perplexed his opponents with unusual comments: when knocked down, he was in the habit of congratulating his opponent on the hit. After a hit by linebacker Ryan Kerrigan that caused a fumble and sent Luck scrambling for the ball, he was not able to congratulate Kerrigan right away and had to wait until later in the game "to tell Kerrigan how great he was doing". Kerrigan's reaction was later captured, "You want to say thank you but then you say 'wait a second—I'm not supposed to like you!'"

On March 31, 2019, Luck married longtime girlfriend Nicole Pechanec, whom he met at Stanford. Luck got Pechanec's number after pretending to lose his phone and asking her to call it. He announced on June 14, 2019, that they were expecting their first child. The couple's first child, a daughter named Lucy, was born in November 2019.

After his retirement, Luck continued to reside in Indianapolis with his family, but moved to the Bay Area in 2022 when he returned to Stanford. He enjoys cycling and skiing.

He is known to be very private, and has no social media presence. Luck briefly had a Facebook account as a teenager but disliked it, calling the Internet a "cesspool of a lot of dark and weird things". Until some time after his retirement, he used a flip phone.

In August 2022, Luck re-enrolled at Stanford as a graduate student, pursuing a master's degree in education. In 2023, Luck began serving as a part-time volunteer coach at nearby Palo Alto High School, working with the school's junior varsity team.

== In the media ==
Luck appeared on the comedy series Parks and Recreation as himself alongside teammates Reggie Wayne, Anthony Castonzo, Robert Mathis, and Adam Vinatieri during the show's sixth season in 2013. In 2025, Luck, Blake Griffin, and Megan Rapinoe voiced themselves in The Simpsons's "Full Heart, Empty Pool", as a trio of retired athletes competing in Homer Simpson's "noodleball" tournament.

Starting in 2015, a parody Twitter account portrays Luck as an American Civil War-like soldier commenting on his career. Known as "Capt. Andrew Luck," this internet meme culminated in Luck appearing on the post-game broadcast dressed as the persona following a September 21, 2023, game between the San Francisco 49ers and the New York Giants. Luck praised the account in 2024, saying he wished he "had the humor and wit to pull off a social media account (like that)."

== See also ==
- List of first overall National Football League draft picks
