= Capt. Andrew Luck =

Social media account

- Account's avatar during Luck's playing career
- Formation: December 2015; 10 years ago
- Publication: Twitter
- Website: Capt. Andrew Luck on X

Capt. Andrew Luck, with the handle @CaptAndrewLuck, is a Twitter account parodying former American football player Andrew Luck. Created in 2015, the account documented Luck's career as a National Football League quarterback in the style of letters written by an American Civil War soldier. It continued to operate sporadically following his retirement before being revived when he became the general manager of the Stanford Cardinal football team.

As of July 2026, the account has garnered over 439,200 followers on Twitter.

== Account ==
While Luck played in the NFL, Capt. Andrew Luck tweeted about Indianapolis Colts games and news as if they were wartime letters for his mother at home. The character is depicted as having grown up on his family farm while his teammates are troops in the same unit. Opposing teams have monikers that paint them as enemy forces, such as "Tiger men" for the Cincinnati Bengals and "Horned Barbarians" referring to the Minnesota Vikings. Individual figures are portrayed as military personnel like Colts head coach Frank Reich being a general and Josh McDaniels a deserter, the latter in reference to his initial hiring as Indianapolis' coach in 2018 before changing his mind.

After Luck retired from the NFL in 2019, the account tweeted he "made the decision to holster my sidearm permanently" and wrote a farewell message formatted as a letter to his unit. Its activity declined in the years since, making only four posts through 2023, before resuming again in November 2024 when Luck was hired as the general manager for his alma mater Stanford. Ahead of Stanford's 2025 season, the program's social media released a trailer of Luck writing a letter in the character's style.

The only accounts that Capt. Andrew Luck follows are the Colts, the Stanford football team, and filmmaker Ken Burns. Burns is best known for creating the documentary series The Civil War, which the account creator credited with inspiring the account.

== History ==
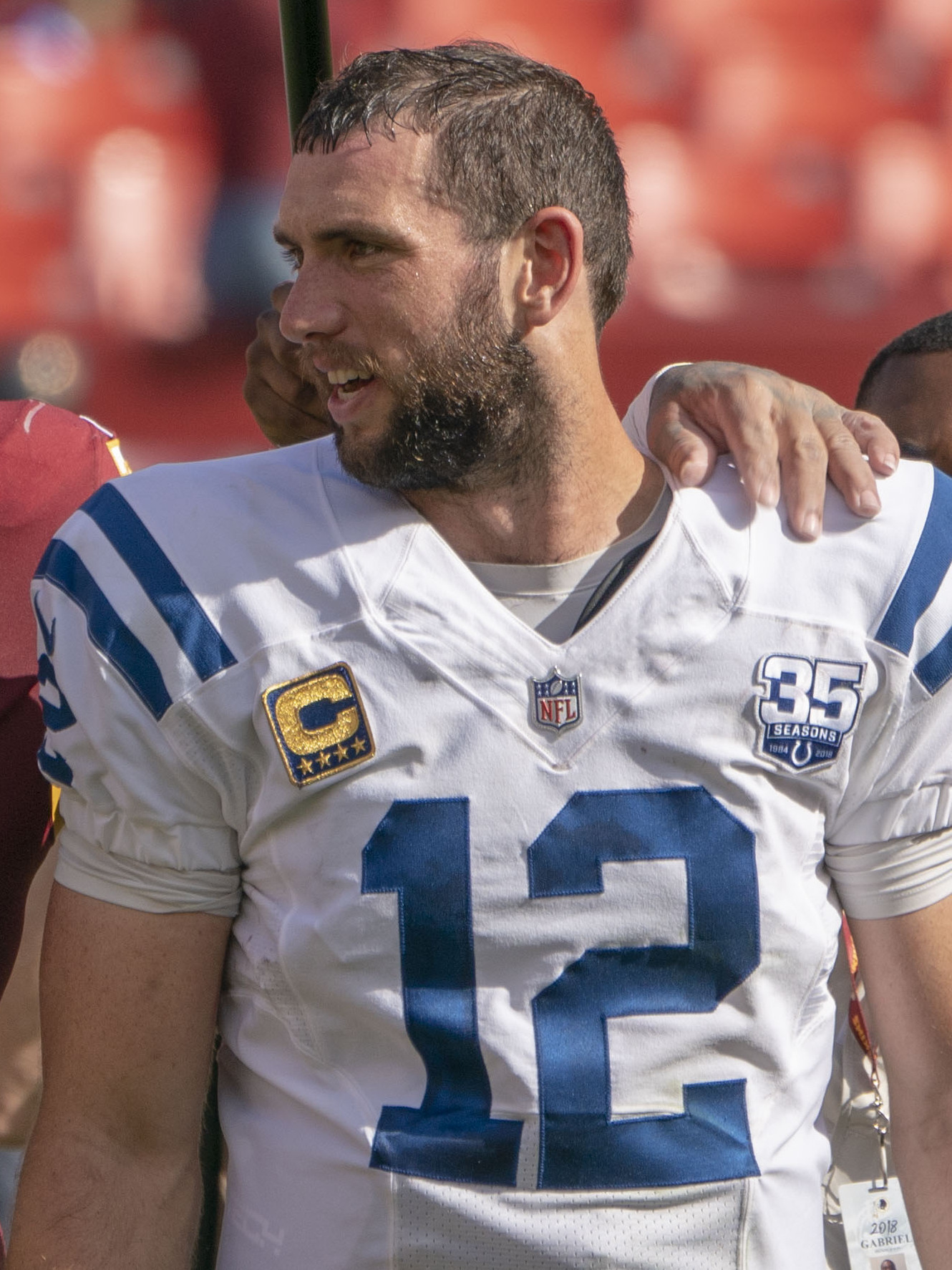
Luck in 2018

During his playing career, Luck typically wore a grizzled neckbeard with large sideburns. The quarterback's facial hair was compared by fans and outlets to that of a mountain man or 19th-century soldier. SB Nation writer Rodger Sherman found Luck's image resembled that of Union army general Rufus King, and photoshopped his face onto King's body for a 2014 post to the site.

SB Nation sports editor Ryan Van Bibber, who majored in history, created "Gen. Andrew Luck" to accompany Sherman's picture. The character wrote wartime-styled letters to his wife "Abigail" throughout the 2014–15 NFL playoffs. After the Colts defeated the Bengals in the Wild Card Round, the corresponding article described the victory as Luck having "defended the garrison at Lucas Oil from a battalion of Cincinnati-born marauders". The Colts' Divisional win over the Denver Broncos was written as if it was a successful military campaign in the Colorado Territory, while losing to the New England Patriots in the AFC Championship Game was an invasion of the New England region that was thwarted by "wily veteran" Tom Brady. The gimmick briefly resumed at the start of the 2015 season to write about injuries plaguing the team, comparing them to disease and battle casualties, though Van Bibber subsequently stopped because "the joke eventually wears out."

Capt. Andrew Luck was launched in December 2015 after its creator, "being a fan of [Luck] and of history", was inspired by Sherman and Van Bibber's posts. After texting some "letters" to their friends, they were encouraged to start the account. Van Bibber joked he "should have copyrighted" the joke but was flattered to see it continue.

== Identity ==
The owner of the account is a self-described "West Coast journalist" and Colts fan who does not disclose their identity since the anonymity makes the persona more fun for followers. They only played recreational football in their youth.

In 2023, West Virginia University linguistics professor Dr. Kirk Hazen speculated the owner is a white male, the most common demographic for those with an "adoring reverence" for The Civil War and the era it covers, who studied a technical field like engineering because of how "crafted" the messages are. Peter S. Carmichael, the director of the Civil War Institute at Gettysburg College and a Colts fan, also doubted they were a professional historian since such an account requires creativity which those in the field do not ordinarily have.

It has been joked that the account could be run by Luck himself because of his background at Stanford University and enjoyment of academia. The Colts embraced the gag in September 2018 by conducting an interview purportedly with the person behind the account before revealing it to be Luck. Luck does not use social media.

== Reception ==
The account has received praise for its unique premise and amusing content. Colts punter Pat McAfee called some tweets "pretty funny" and "has some comedian in him". Prior to the Colts' preseason game against the Chicago Bears in 2019, ironically when reports of Luck's retirement broke, Bears cornerback Prince Amukamara challenged the account to prepare for battle.

Michael Adams, an English professor at Indiana University who researches lexicography, noted the account's writing style does not properly reflect letters penned during the Civil War. For example, the tweets use terminology that were not common vernacular in 1860s American English such as "tundra" and "sniper". The grammar and spelling differed from the word variations seen during that time period as well, though Hazen opined they made the tweets easier for a modern audience to understand. Hazen admitted the tweets still resembled wartime letters enough that he could "almost hear Shelby Foote's voice in some of these lines".

Luck has praised its owner for their ingenuity, remarking in 2024 that he wished he "had the humor and wit to pull off a social media account (like that)." He was still playing in the NFL when he became aware of the account, having received text messages from his mother and friends with screenshots of tweets. On September 21, 2023, following the San Francisco 49ers–New York Giants game, Luck appeared on Thursday Night Football's post-game show dressed in a replica Civil War uniform and quipped "the war is over"; Capt. Andrew Luck tweeted again afterward hoping his mother appreciated his "magical, moving picture box" cameo.

Similar accounts have also been created for other players such as "Major Ryan Fitzpatrick", who has a similar beard to Luck, and "Lieutenant Jacoby Brissett", who took over as Colts quarterback following Luck's retirement.
