= List of Stanford Cardinal in the NFL draft =

This is a list of Stanford Cardinal football players in the NFL draft.

== Key ==
B	Back	K	Kicker	NT	Nose tackle
C	Center	LB	Linebacker	FB	Fullback
DB	Defensive back	P	Punter	HB	Halfback
DE	Defensive end	QB	Quarterback	WR	Wide receiver
DT	Defensive tackle	RB	Running back	G	Guard
E	End	T	Offensive tackle	TE	Tight end

== Selections ==
Year	Round	Pick	Overall	Player	Team	Position
1936	2	2	11	Keith Topping	Boston Redskins	E
1936	3	1	19	Wes Muller	Philadelphia Eagles	C
1936	3	3	21	Bobby Grayson	Pittsburgh Steelers	B
1936	6	7	52	Bob Reynolds	Green Bay Packers	T
1936	8	4	67	Bob "Bones" Hamilton	Brooklyn Dodgers	B
1936	9	4	76	Jim Moscrip	Brooklyn Dodgers	E
1936	9	5	77	Niels Larsen	Chicago Cardinals	T
1939	8	10	70	Pete Zagar	New York Giants	T
1939	11	7	97	Tony Calvelli	Detroit Lions	C
1939	19	10	180	Bill Paulman	New York Giants	B
1940	9	7	77	Hamp Pool	Chicago Bears	E
1940	12	1	101	Stan Anderson	Chicago Cardinals	T
1941	1	3	3	Norm Standlee	Chicago Bears	B
1941	3	8	23	Hugh Gallarneau	Chicago Bears	B
1942	1	3	3	Pete Kmetovic	Philadelphia Eagles	B
1942	1	10	10	Frankie Albert	Chicago Bears	QB
1942	2	3	13	Vic Lindskog	Philadelphia Eagles	C
1942	12	3	103	Fred Meyer	Philadelphia Eagles	E
1942	17	3	153	Arnie Meiners	Philadelphia Eagles	E
1943	4	5	30	Chuck Taylor	Cleveland Rams	G
1943	5	9	39	Ed Stamm	Chicago Bears	T
1943	6	2	42	Bruno Banducci	Philadelphia Eagles	G
1943	7	9	59	Milt Vucinich	Chicago Bears	C
1943	11	9	99	Ray Hammett	Chicago Bears	B
1943	18	9	169	Hank Norberg	Chicago Bears	E
1944	3	4	20	Loren LaPrade	Philadelphia Eagles	G
1944	7	11	62	Darwin Seeley	Chicago Bears	C
1944	8	8	73	Randall Fawcett	Chicago Bears	B
1944	9	10	86	Fred Boensch	Cleveland Rams	T
1944	12	7	116	Bill Joslyn	Washington Redskins	B
1944	21	6	214	Jim Cox	Green Bay Packers	T
1944	25	4	256	Bob Frisbee	Philadelphia Eagles	B
1944	32	2	326	Willard Sheller	Washington Redskins	B
1945	20	6	203	Bill Shipkey	Washington Redskins	B
1945	24	8	249	Jim McMurdy	Washington Redskins	C
1945	25	9	261	Bob Hall	Philadelphia Eagles	E
1945	26	10	273	Doug Graham	New York Giants	T
1946	23	4	214	Al Hoisch	Chicago Bears	B
1947	5	7	32	Lloyd Merriman	Chicago Bears	B
1947	13	9	114	Bill Hachten	New York Giants	G
1947	28	6	261	Charley Wakefield	Philadelphia Eagles	T
1947	29	3	268	Lynn Brownson	Washington Redskins	B
1948	2	2	13	George Quist	Detroit Lions	B
1948	9	3	68	Bob Anderson	Washington Redskins	B
1948	12	5	100	Atherton Phleger	Los Angeles Rams	T
1950	18	10	232	Rupert Andrews	Chicago Bears	B
1950	24	2	302	Bill DeYoung	New York Bulldogs	B
1951	9	2	100	Bruce Van Alstyne	San Francisco 49ers	E
1951	16	1	184	Bob White	San Francisco 49ers	B
1951	18	4	211	Russ Pomeroy	Chicago Cardinals	T
1952	3	7	32	Bill McColl	Chicago Bears	E
1952	16	9	190	Bobby Meyers	San Francisco 49ers	B
1952	17	1	194	Dick Horn	New York Yanks	B
1952	19	5	222	Gary Kerkorian	Pittsburgh Steelers	QB
1952	21	1	242	Harry Hugasian	New York Yanks	B
1953	30	3	352	Bob Mathias	Washington Redskins	B
1954	1	1	1	Bobby Garrett	Cleveland Browns	QB
1954	10	4	113	John Steinberg	New York Giants	E
1954	20	7	236	Sam Morley	Washington Redskins	E
1954	24	2	279	Marv Tennefoss	Green Bay Packers	E
1955	28	8	333	Don Sanders	San Francisco 49ers	B
1956	6	12	73	Paul Wiggin	Cleveland Browns	E
1956	27	2	315	Jerry Gustafson	San Francisco 49ers	QB
1957	1	3	3	John Brodie	San Francisco 49ers	QB
1957	4	5	42	Paul Camera	Cleveland Browns	E
1957	24	6	283	Allen Napolean	Cleveland Browns	B
1959	19	9	225	Chris Plain	Chicago Bears	T
1960	5	9	57	Dick Norman	Chicago Bears	QB
1960	9	9	105	Chris Burford	Cleveland Browns	WR
1960	13	11	155	Dean Hinshaw	San Francisco 49ers	T
1963	4	14	56	Carlton Simons	Green Bay Packers	C
1963	8	10	108	Frank Atkinson	Pittsburgh Steelers	T
1963	13	1	169	Al Hildebrand	Los Angeles Rams	T
1964	2	11	25	Steve Thurlow	New York Giants	RB
1964	9	10	122	Bob Nichols	Pittsburgh Steelers	T
1964	11	14	154	Dick Leeuwenburg	Chicago Bears	T
1964	13	7	175	Marvin Harris	Los Angeles Rams	C
1965	3	14	42	Jack Chapple	San Francisco 49ers	LB
1965	18	4	242	Bob Howard	Pittsburgh Steelers	B
1966	2	4	20	Gary Pettigrew	Philadelphia Eagles	DE
1966	8	4	114	John Mason	Philadelphia Eagles	E
1967	5	2	109	David Lewis	New York Giants	RB
1967	5	24	131	Mike Hibler	Oakland Raiders	LB
1967	10	24	261	Tim Sheehan	Houston Oilers	C
1968	5	19	130	Blaine Nye	Dallas Cowboys	T
1969	1	16	16	Gene Washington	San Francisco 49ers	WR
1969	2	24	50	George Buehler	Oakland Raiders	G
1969	3	2	54	Malcolm Snider	Atlanta Falcons	T
1969	6	14	144	Bill Nicholson	Chicago Bears	DE
1969	15	5	369	Bill Shoemaker	Cincinnati Bengals	K
1970	4	13	91	Don Parish	St. Louis Cardinals	LB
1970	9	16	224	Bob Reinhard	Green Bay Packers	G
1970	10	2	236	Isaiah Brown	Pittsburgh Steelers	DB
1970	15	14	378	David Sharp	Houston Oilers	T
1971	1	1	1	Jim Plunkett	New England Patriots	QB
1971	4	18	96	Dave Tipton	New York Giants	DT
1971	5	19	123	Bob Moore	Oakland Raiders	TE
1971	5	25	129	Ron Kadziel	Dallas Cowboys	LB
1971	17	2	418	Randy Vataha	Los Angeles Rams	WR
1972	1	6	6	Greg Sampson	Houston Oilers	DE
1972	1	10	10	Jeff Siemon	Minnesota Vikings	LB
1972	2	10	36	Pete Lazetich	San Diego Chargers	DE
1972	8	20	202	Jackie Brown	Oakland Raiders	RB
1972	12	21	307	Don Bunce	Washington Redskins	QB
1972	16	16	406	Larry Butler	Atlanta Falcons	LB
1973	4	8	86	Jim Merlo	New Orleans Saints	LB
1973	7	9	165	Mike Askea	Denver Broncos	T
1973	14	24	362	Roger Cowan	Pittsburgh Steelers	DE
1974	4	9	87	Mike Boryla	Cincinnati Bengals	QB
1974	5	16	120	Jim Ferguson	Minnesota Vikings	DB
1974	6	15	145	John Winesberry	Denver Broncos	WR
1974	7	19	175	Rod Garcia	Oakland Raiders	K
1974	12	25	311	Randy Poltl	Minnesota Vikings	DB
1974	16	24	414	Dave Ottmar	Los Angeles Rams	P
1975	4	12	90	Pat Donovan	Dallas Cowboys	DE
1975	9	4	212	Roger Stillwell	Chicago Bears	DT
1975	9	21	229	Gordon Riegal	Los Angeles Rams	LB
1975	11	13	273	Keith Rowen	Philadelphia Eagles	G
1975	13	6	318	John Snider	Kansas City Chiefs	LB
1975	14	18	356	Scott Laidlaw	Dallas Cowboys	RB
1976	9	26	263	Jeb Church	Los Angeles Rams	DB
1976	17	7	466	Todd Anderson	New England Patriots	C
1977	3	6	62	Tony Hill	Dallas Cowboys	WR
1977	4	13	97	Duncan McColl	Washington Redskins	DE
1977	5	1	113	Mike Michel	Miami Dolphins	K
1977	10	12	263	Gary Anderson	Detroit Lions	G
1977	11	7	286	Mike Cordova	Philadelphia Eagles	QB
1978	1	6	6	James Lofton	Green Bay Packers	WR
1978	1	10	10	Gordon King	New York Giants	T
1978	2	23	51	Guy Benjamin	Miami Dolphins	QB
1978	7	18	184	Bill Kellar	Kansas City Chiefs	WR
1979	4	15	97	Steve Dils	Minnesota Vikings	QB
1979	7	1	166	Phil Francis	San Francisco 49ers	RB
1980	2	16	44	Andre Hines	Seattle Seahawks	T
1980	8	13	206	Chuck Evans	New Orleans Saints	LB
1980	9	21	242	Turk Schonert	Chicago Bears	QB
1981	1	19	19	Brian Holloway	New England Patriots	T
1981	3	11	67	Ken Margerum	Chicago Bears	WR
1981	8	1	194	Ken Naber	New England Patriots	K
1982	1	7	7	Darrin Nelson	Minnesota Vikings	RB
1982	2	9	36	Doug Rogers	Atlanta Falcons	DE
1982	6	19	158	Andre Tyler	Tampa Bay Buccaneers	WR
1982	11	15	294	John Macaulay	Green Bay Packers	C
1983	1	1	1	John Elway	Baltimore Colts	QB
1983	3	13	69	Chris Dressel	Houston Oilers	TE
1983	6	23	163	Vincent White	New York Jets	RB
1983	8	26	222	Mike Dotterer	Los Angeles Raiders	RB
1983	9	17	241	Chris Rose	Baltimore Colts	T
1984	6	21	161	Eric Mullins	Houston Oilers	WR
1985	2	20	48	Garin Veris	New England Patriots	DE
1985	4	3	87	Tom Briehl	Houston Oilers	LB
1985	4	5	89	Emile Harry	Atlanta Falcons	WR
1985	6	11	151	Jeff Deaton	New York Jets	G
1985	6	17	157	Matt Moran	Dallas Cowboys	G
1985	10	5	257	Brent Martin	Atlanta Falcons	C
1986	8	26	220	Greg Baty	New England Patriots	TE
1987	2	17	45	David Wyman	Seattle Seahawks	LB
1987	6	12	152	Thomas Henley	New Orleans Saints	WR
1987	7	4	172	Tony Leiker	Green Bay Packers	DT
1987	8	12	207	Toi Cook	New Orleans Saints	DB
1987	10	24	275	John Paye	San Francisco 49ers	QB
1988	1	23	23	Brad Muster	Chicago Bears	RB
1988	7	4	169	Jeff James	Detroit Lions	WR
1989	10	28	279	Andy Sinclair	San Francisco 49ers	C
1990	4	9	90	Rob Hinckley	Detroit Lions	LB
1990	4	22	103	Alan Grant	Indianapolis Colts	DB
1990	7	21	186	Lester Archambeau	Green Bay Packers	DE
1991	3	28	83	Ed McCaffrey	New York Giants	WR
1991	4	8	91	Kevin Scott	Detroit Lions	DB
1992	1	8	8	Bob Whitfield	Atlanta Falcons	T
1992	1	9	9	Tommy Vardell	Cleveland Browns	RB
1992	9	27	251	Chris Walsh	Buffalo Bills	WR
1992	10	9	261	Turner Baur	New England Patriots	TE
1993	1	22	22	Darrien Gordon	San Diego Chargers	DB
1993	2	14	43	Glyn Milburn	Denver Broncos	RB
1993	3	26	82	John Lynch	Tampa Bay Buccaneers	DB
1993	5	9	121	Ron George	Atlanta Falcons	LB
1993	6	26	166	Chris Dalman	San Francisco 49ers	G
1994	4	21	124	Vaughn Bryant	Detroit Lions	DB
1995	4	15	113	Justin Armour	Buffalo Bills	WR
1995	4	33	131	Tony Cline Jr.	Buffalo Bills	TE
1995	4	36	134	Steve Stenstrom	Kansas City Chiefs	QB
1995	7	35	243	Jason Fisk	Minnesota Vikings	DT
1996	7	21	230	Jeff Buckey	Miami Dolphins	G
1997	3	17	77	Greg Clark	San Francisco 49ers	TE
1997	5	32	162	Brad Badger	Washington Redskins	G
1997	6	7	170	Brian Manning	Miami Dolphins	WR
1997	7	13	214	Nathan Parks	Kansas City Chiefs	T
1998	2	21	51	Kailee Wong	Minnesota Vikings	DE
1998	3	2	63	Jon Ritchie	Oakland Raiders	RB
1998	6	4	157	Chris Draft	Chicago Bears	LB
1998	6	9	162	Carl Hansen	Seattle Seahawks	DT
1998	7	5	194	Jon Haskins	San Diego Chargers	RB
2000	5	36	165	Troy Walters	Minnesota Vikings	WR
2000	6	36	202	Todd Husak	Washington Redskins	QB
2001	2	26	57	Willie Howard	Minnesota Vikings	DT
2001	6	5	168	Riall Johnson	Cincinnati Bengals	DE
2002	2	13	45	Tank Williams	Tennessee Titans	DB
2002	3	32	97	Coy Wire	Buffalo Bills	DB
2002	5	2	137	Randy Fasani	Carolina Panthers	QB
2002	6	32	204	Brian Allen	Indianapolis Colts	RB
2002	7	28	239	Eric Heitmann	San Francisco 49ers	G
2002	7	44	255	Zack Quaccia	Tampa Bay Buccaneers	C
2003	1	26	26	Kwame Harris	San Francisco 49ers	T
2003	2	31	63	Teyo Johnson	Oakland Raiders	WR
2003	4	22	119	Colin Branch	Carolina Panthers	DB
2003	7	33	247	Casey Moore	Carolina Panthers	RB
2004	5	29	161	Amon Gordon	Cleveland Browns	DE
2004	6	11	176	Kirk Chambers	Cleveland Browns	G
2004	6	32	197	Drew Caylor	Pittsburgh Steelers	C
2005	3	2	66	Oshiomogho Atogwe	St. Louis Rams	DB
2005	3	7	71	Alex Smith	Tampa Bay Buccaneers	TE
2005	3	8	72	Stanley Wilson	Detroit Lions	DB
2005	6	9	183	Jared Newberry	Washington Redskins	LB
2005	6	13	187	Will Svitek	Kansas City Chiefs	T
2005	7	38	252	David Bergeron	Philadelphia Eagles	LB
2006	3	13	77	Jon Alston	St. Louis Rams	LB
2006	5	24	156	Julian Jenkins	Tampa Bay Buccaneers	DE
2006	6	12	181	Babatunde Oshinowo	Cleveland Browns	DT
2006	7	30	238	T. J. Rushing	Indianapolis Colts	DB
2007	3	29	92	Trent Edwards	Buffalo Bills	QB
2007	3	31	94	Michael Okwo	Chicago Bears	LB
2007	5	7	144	Brandon Harrison	Houston Texans	DB
2010	2	19	51	Toby Gerhart	Minnesota Vikings	RB
2010	7	26	233	Jim Dray	Arizona Cardinals	TE
2010	7	46	253	Erik Lorig	Tampa Bay Buccaneers	DE
2011	3	33	97	Sione Fua	Carolina Panthers	DT
2011	4	27	124	Owen Marecic	Cleveland Browns	RB
2011	5	23	154	Richard Sherman	Seattle Seahawks	DB
2011	6	2	167	Ryan Whalen	Cincinnati Bengals	WR
2012	1	1	1	Andrew Luck	Indianapolis Colts	QB
2012	1	24	24	David DeCastro	Pittsburgh Steelers	G
2012	2	2	34	Coby Fleener	Indianapolis Colts	TE
2012	2	10	42	Jonathan Martin	Miami Dolphins	T
2013	2	3	35	Zach Ertz	Philadelphia Eagles	TE
2013	4	36	133	Levine Toilolo	Atlanta Falcons	TE
2013	5	7	140	Stepfan Taylor	Arizona Cardinals	RB
2014	2	15	47	Trent Murphy	Washington Redskins	LB
2014	4	40	140	Cameron Fleming	New England Patriots	T
2014	5	5	145	David Yankey	Minnesota Vikings	G
2014	5	22	162	Ed Reynolds	Philadelphia Eagles	DB
2014	6	28	204	Tyler Gaffney	Carolina Panthers	RB
2014	7	16	231	Ben Gardner	Dallas Cowboys	DE
2015	1	13	13	Andrus Peat	New Orleans Saints	T
2015	2	32	64	Jordan Richards	New England Patriots	DB
2015	3	16	80	Alex Carter	Detroit Lions	DB
2015	3	29	93	Henry Anderson	Indianapolis Colts	DE
2015	3	30	94	Ty Montgomery	Green Bay Packers	WR
2015	5	15	151	David Parry	Indianapolis Colts	DT
2016	1	28	28	Joshua Garnett	San Francisco 49ers	G
2016	3	18	81	Austin Hooper	Atlanta Falcons	TE
2016	4	33	131	Blake Martinez	Green Bay Packers	LB
2016	5	25	162	Kevin Hogan	Kansas City Chiefs	QB
2016	6	25	200	Kyle Murphy	Green Bay Packers	T
2017	1	3	3	Solomon Thomas	San Francisco 49ers	DE
2017	1	8	8	Christian McCaffrey	Carolina Panthers	RB
2018	3	4	68	Justin Reid	Houston Texans	DB
2018	3	32	96	Harrison Phillips	Buffalo Bills	DT
2018	4	37	137	Dalton Schultz	Dallas Cowboys	TE
2018	6	40	214	Peter Kalambayi	Houston Texans	LB
2019	2	25	57	J. J. Arcega-Whiteside	Philadelphia Eagles	WR
2019	3	25	89	Bobby Okereke	Indianapolis Colts	LB
2019	4	10	112	Bryce Love	Washington Redskins	RB
2019	5	25	163	Jake Bailey	New England Patriots	P
2019	6	3	176	Kaden Smith	San Francisco 49ers	TE
2020	4	27	133	Colby Parkinson	Seattle Seahawks	TE
2020	7	19	233	Casey Toohill	Philadelphia Eagles	LB
2021	2	13	45	Walker Little	Jacksonville Jaguars	T
2021	3	3	67	Davis Mills	Houston Texans	QB
2021	3	12	76	Paulson Adebo	New Orleans Saints	DB
2021	4	9	114	Drew Dalman	Atlanta Falcons	C
2021	5	35	179	Simi Fehoko	Dallas Cowboys	WR
2022	5	7	150	Thomas Booker	Houston Texans	DT
2023	3	31	94	Michael Wilson	Arizona Cardinals	WR
2023	5	22	157	Kyu Blu Kelly	Baltimore Ravens	DB
2023	6	11	188	Tanner McKee	Philadelphia Eagles	QB
2023	6	22	197	Elijah Higgins	Miami Dolphins	WR
2023	7	41	258	Kendall Williamson	Chicago Bears	DB
2024	6	33	209	Joshua Karty	Los Angeles Rams	K
2025	4	34	136	Elic Ayomanor	Tennessee Titans	WR
2026	3	5	69	Sam Roush	Chicago Bears	TE
2026	6	22	203	CJ Williams	Jacksonville Jaguars	WR
