= 1950 All-Pacific Coast football team =

American all-star college football team

The 1950 All-Pacific Coast football team consists of American football players chosen by various organizations for All-Pacific Coast teams for the 1950 college football season.

== Selections ==
=== Backs ===
- Don Heinrich, Washington (AP-1; Coaches-1; UP-1 [quarterback])
- Hugh McElhenny, Washington (AP-1; Coaches-1; UP-1)
- Jim Monachino, California (AP-1; Coaches-1; UP-1)
- Johnny Olszewski, California (AP-1; UP-1 [fullback])
- Dick Sprague, Washington (AP-1 [defensive back]; Coaches-1 [defensive back])
- Carl Van Heuit, California (AP-1 [safety]; Coaches-1 [safety])
- Pete Schabarum, California (Coaches-1; UP-2)
- Roland Kirkby, Washington (Coaches-1 [defensive back]; UP-2)
- Earl Stelle, Oregon (Coaches-1 [defensive back])
- Johnny Williams, USC (Coaches-1 [defensive back])
- Ollie Matson, Univ. San Francisco (AP-1 [defensive back])
- Don Robison, California (AP-2)
- Dick Lemmon, California (AP-2)
- Marte Formico, Santa Clara (AP-2)
- Bob Gambold, Washington State (UP-2)
- Sam Baker, Oregon State (UP-2)

=== Ends ===
- Bill McColl, Stanford (AP-1 [offensive and defensive end]; Coaches-1; UP-1)
- Bob Wilkinson, UCLA (AP-1; Coaches-1 [tie]; UP-1)
- Bob Minahen, California (AP-1 [defensive end]; Coaches-1 [defensive end]; UP-2)
- Joe Cloidt, Washington (AP-2; Coaches-1; UP-2)
- Ed Bartlett, California (AP-2; Coaches-1 [defensive end])
- Darrell Riggs, UCLA (Coaches-1 [defensive end])
- John Thomas, Oregon State (AP-2)
- Bruce Van Alstyne, Stanford (AP-2)

=== Tackles ===
- Volney Peters, USC (AP-1 [defensive tackle]; Coaches-1 [offensive and defensive tackle]; UP-1)
- Russ Pomeroy, Stanford (AP-1 [linebacker]; Coaches-1 [linebacker]; UP-1)
- Breck Stroschein, UCLA (AP-1; Coaches-1 [defensive tackle]; UP-2)
- Bob Karpe, California (AP-1; Coaches-1)
- Arvid Niemi, Oregon State (AP-1 [defensive tackle]; UP-2)
- Bill Fray, Idaho (AP-2)
- Gino Marchetti, Univ. San Francisco (AP-2)
- Gordon White, Stanford (AP-2)
- Ray Solari, California (AP-2 [linebacker])
- Burl Toler, Univ. San Francisco (AP-2 [linebacker])

=== Guards ===
- Les Richter, California (AP-1 [defensive guard]; Coaches-1 [offensive and defensive guard]; UP-1 [linebacker guard])
- Ted Holzknecht, Washington (AP-1; Coaches-1 [defensive guard]; UP-1)
- Paul McMurtry, USC (AP-2; Coaches-1; UP-2)
- Bruce MacLachlan, UCLA (AP-2; Coaches-1)
- Chet Daniels, Oregon (AP-1)
- Dick Stanfel, Univ. San Francisco (AP-1 [defensive guard])
- Ray Colquitt, Idaho (AP-2)
- Pat Cannamela, USC (AP-2)
- Ray Lung, Oregon (AP-2)

=== Centers ===
- Donn Moomaw, UCLA (AP-1 [linebacker]; Coaches-1 [linebacker]; UP-1)
- Mike Michaels, Washington (Coaches-1; UP-2)
- LaVern Torgeson, Washington State (AP-1; UP-2)
- Bob Moser, Pacific (AP-2)

== Key ==
AP = Associated Press, selected for the AP by writers, coaches and scouts and based on a two-platoon system

Coaches = selected by the conference coaches and announced by the PCC Commissioner's office

UP = United Press, "selected with the aid of West Coast sports writers"

Bold = Consensus first-team selection of the AP, UP and coaches

== See also ==
- 1950 College Football All-America Team
