= Hal Hatfield =

American gridiron football player (1927–2001)

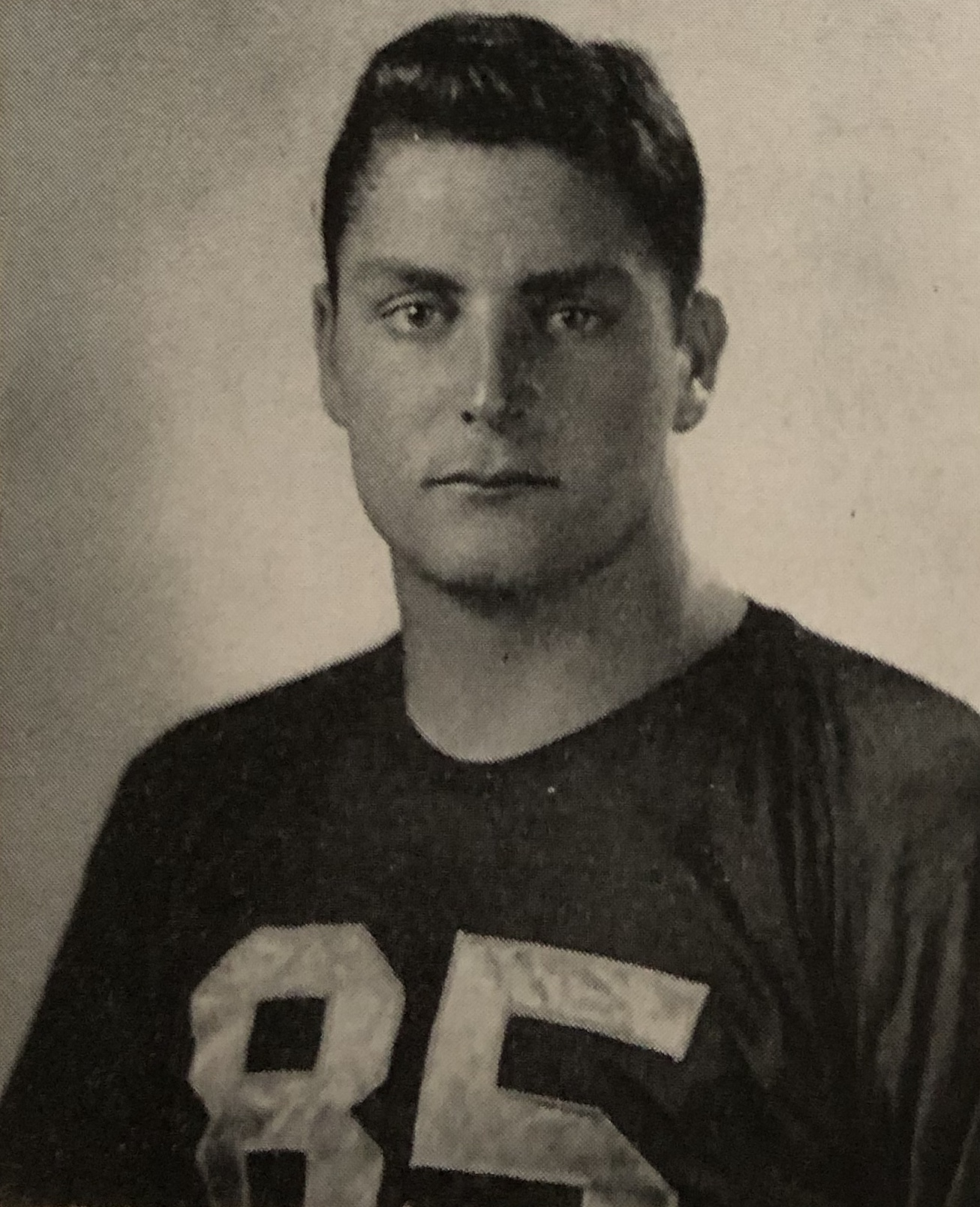
- Hatfield at USC c. 1948

Profile
- Position: End

Personal information
- Born: July 21, 1927; Hermosa Beach, California, U.S.
- Died: October 31, 2001 (aged 74); California, U.S.
- Listed height: 6 ft 2 in (1.88 m)
- Listed weight: 210 lb (95 kg)

Career information
- College: Southern California
- NFL draft: 1951: 16th round, 188th overall pick

Career history
- 1951–1952: Edmonton Eskimos

Awards and highlights
- Second-team All-PCC (1949)

Harold Knight Hatfield (July 21, 1927 – October 31, 2001) was an American professional football player who played for the Edmonton Eskimos. He previously played college football at the University of Southern California.
