= Ray Solari =

American football player and coach (1928–2023)

Biographical details
- Born: February 13, 1928; San Francisco, California, U.S.
- Died: March 17, 2023 (aged 95)

Playing career
- 1949–1950: California
- Position: Linebacker

Coaching career (HC unless noted)
- 1956–1971: South Pasadena HS (CA)
- 1972–1994: Menlo

Head coaching record
- Overall: 33–46–2 (college); 120–43–5 (high school)
- Tournaments: 0–1 (NCAA D-III playoffs)

Accomplishments and honors

Championships
- 1 Coast Conference (1985)

Awards
- Second-team All-PCC (1950)

Raymond Solari (February 13, 1928 – March 17, 2023) was an American football player and coach. He was a two-time letter winner playing college football for the California Golden Bears in 1949 and 1950. He was selected by the Cleveland Browns in the 19th round of the 1951 NFL draft. Solari served as the head football coach at Menlo College in Atherton, California from 1972 to 1994. Menlo competed as junior college, before moving to NCAA Division III competition in 1986. He was the head football coach at South Pasadena High School in South Pasadena, California from 1956 to 1971, tallying a mark of 120–43–5.

Solari died on March 17, 2023, at the age of 95.

== Head coaching record ==
=== College ===
| Year | Team | Overall | Conference | Standing | Bowl/playoffs |
|---|---|---|---|---|---|
Menlo Oaks (NCAA Division III independent) (1986–1994)
| 1986 | Menlo | 4–4–1 | | | |
| 1987 | Menlo | 7–3 | | | L NCAA Division III First Round |
| 1988 | Menlo | 7–2 | | | |
| 1989 | Menlo | 3–6 | | | |
| 1990 | Menlo | 5–3 | | | |
| 1991 | Menlo | 2–7 | | | |
| 1992 | Menlo | 3–6 | | | |
| 1993 | Menlo | 0–8–1 | | | |
| 1994 | Menlo | 2–7 | | | |
| Menlo: | | 33–46–2 | | | |
| Total: | | 33–46–2 | | | |

=== Junior college ===
| Year | Team | Overall | Conference | Standing | Bowl/playoffs |
|---|---|---|---|---|---|
Menlo Oaks (Coast Conference) (1972–1985)
| 1972 | Menlo | 7–3 | 3–2 | T–2nd | |
| 1973 | Menlo | 7–3 | 4–1 | 2nd | |
| 1974 | Menlo | 3–5–1 | 2–3 | T–4th | |
| 1975 | Menlo | 1–9 | 1–4 | 5th | |
| 1976 | Menlo | 4–4–1 | 2–3 | 4th | |
| 1977 | Menlo | 8–2 | 3–2 | T–2nd | |
| 1978 | Menlo | 3–7 | 1–4 | T–4th | |
| 1979 | Menlo | | 1–4 | 5th | |
| 1980 | Menlo | 3–6–1 | 2–3 | 4th | |
| 1981 | Menlo | 6–4 | 3–3 | T–3rd | |
| 1982 | Menlo | 6–3 | 3–2 | 3rd | |
| 1983 | Menlo | 5–3–2 | 3–1–2 | 3rd | |
| 1984 | Menlo | 8–2 | 4–2 | 2nd | |
| 1985 | Menlo | 9–0–1 | 5–0–1 | 1st | |
| Menlo: | | | 37–34–3 | | |
| Total: | | | | | |
National championship Conference title Conference division title or championship game berth
