= Jim Cullom =

American football player (1925–1998)

No. 24
- Position: Guard

Personal information
- Born: November 5, 1925; Healdsburg, California, U.S.
- Died: March 4, 1998 (aged 72); Oakland, California, U.S.
- Listed height: 5 ft 11 in (1.80 m)
- Listed weight: 235 lb (107 kg)

Career information
- High school: Piedmont (CA)
- College: California
- NFL draft: 1950: 17th round, 214 (By the Washington Redskins)th overall pick

Career history
- New York Yanks (1951)

Awards and highlights
- First-team All-PCC (1949)

Career NFL statistics
- Games played: 2
- Stats at Pro Football Reference

James Henry "Truck" Cullom (November 5, 1925 – March 4, 1998) was an American professional football guard in the National Football League (NFL) for the New York Yanks.

Cullom served in the United States Marine Corps during World War II. After the war, he played college football at the University of California, where he was a three-year lineman and placekicker from 1947–49, playing on two of coach Pappy Waldorf's Rose Bowl teams. Cullom was a first-team All-Coast tackle in 1949, and also played on Cal's rugby team.

Cullom was drafted in the 24th round of the 1949 NFL draft and again in the seventeenth round of the 1950 NFL draft by the Washington Redskins. After one season playing for the New York Yanks, he was recalled by the Marines and was wounded in the Korean War. Cullom later returned to Cal where he worked as an assistant coach for both the football and rugby teams.

Cullom was inducted into the University of California Athletic Hall of Fame in 1995.
