= Milt McColl =

American football player and physician (born 1959)

No. 53, 56
- Position: Outside linebacker

Personal information
- Born: August 28, 1959 (age 67); Oak Park, Illinois, U.S.
- Listed height: 6 ft 6 in (1.98 m)
- Listed weight: 248 lb (112 kg)

Career information
- High school: South Hills (West Covina, California)
- College: Stanford
- NFL draft: 1981: undrafted

Career history
- San Francisco 49ers (1981–1987); Los Angeles Raiders (1988)

Awards and highlights
- 2× Super Bowl champion (XVI, XIX); Second-team All-Pac-10 (1980)

Career NFL statistics
- Sacks: 9.5
- Interceptions: 2
- Fumble recoveries: 1
- Stats at Pro Football Reference

Milton Bird McColl (born August 28, 1959) is an American physician and former football linebacker. He played college football at Stanford University and in the National Football League (NFL) from 1981 to 1988, during which he played for the San Francisco 49ers from 1981 to 1987 and Los Angeles Raiders in 1988. With the 49ers, McColl appeared in Super Bowl XVI and Super Bowl XIX. He is the son of former Stanford and NFL end Bill McColl.

== Early life ==
Born in Oak Park, Illinois, McColl graduated from South Hills High School in West Covina, California in 1977.

== College career ==
Following in the footsteps of his father and brother, McColl attended Stanford University and played at linebacker for the Stanford Cardinal from 1977 to 1980. On the 1978 team that won the Astro-Bluebonnet Bowl, McColl led the team in sacks with seven. As a senior in 1980, McColl led Stanford in sacks (four) and tackles for loss (eight).

== Pro football career ==
Signing with the San Francisco 49ers as an undrafted free agent in 1981, McColl played for the 49ers from 1981 to 1987 as an outside linebacker. As a rookie with the 49ers, McColl came off the bench for all 16 regular season games and three playoff games for the 1981 team that won Super Bowl XVI and returned an interception for 22 yards. With five seconds before halftime in Super Bowl XVI, McColl recovered a fumbled kick return by Archie Griffin. The fumble recovery set up a field goal in the 49ers' 26–21 win over the Cincinnati Bengals.

McColl made his first career start in 1982, when he played in nine games with two starts. In 1984, McColl won the second Super Bowl title of his career. Playing as a reserve for all 16 regular season and three playoff games, including Super Bowl XIX, McColl had a career high 4.0 sacks.

In 1985, playing in 16 games with four starts, McColl scored the only touchdown of his career, off a 28-yard fumble return. Eventually, McColl became the regular starting left outside linebacker, with 15 starts in 1986 and 12 starts in 1987. McColl made his second career interception in 1987.

McColl ended his football career in 1988 with the Los Angeles Raiders, playing in 15 games as a reserve. In an eight-season NFL career, McColl played in 112 games with 31 starts, two interceptions, 8.5 sacks, and a fumble returned for a touchdown.

== Medical career ==
McColl graduated from Stanford University School of Medicine with an M.D. in 1988, after attending classes when the NFL was not in season.

After completing his medical internship in 1989, McColl took a job as director of marketing and business development at orthopedic startup Origin Medsystems while waiting for a residency spot; he enjoyed that job enough to forgo a medical residency in order to pursue a career in medical devices. McColl was an executive at Boston Scientific for six years, first as clinical, regulatory, and quality vice president from 2001 to 2004, then as neurovascular division president from 2004 to 2007. McColl became a partner at New Leaf Venture Partners in 2007.

From 2011 to 2015, McColl was CEO of Gauss Surgical, a business supported by StartX that raised nearly $12.5 million to develop a device that made real-time measurements of blood loss. After leaving Gauss, McColl returned to Stanford School of Medicine in 2015 to begin with the Stanford Health Care–O'Connor Hospital Family Medical Residency program. In 2019, McColl completed his residency at Santa Clara Valley Medical Center in San Jose in family medicine and family planning.

== Personal life ==
His father Bill McColl, who played for Stanford and the Chicago Bears, became an orthopedic surgeon. His brother Duncan McColl also played, as did nephew Daniel McColl.

McColl and his wife Cindy Emanuels live in Los Altos Hills, California. They have four sons. Their youngest son, Patrick, was drafted by the Oakland A's in the tenth round of the 2019 MLB draft.
