= 1949 All-Pacific Coast football team =

American all-star college football team

The 1949 All-Pacific Coast football team consists of American football players chosen by various organizations for All-Pacific Coast teams for the 1949 college football season.

== Selections ==
=== Backs ===
- Ken Carpenter, Oregon State (AP-1; Coaches-1 [halfback]; INS-1 [halfback])
- Eddie LeBaron, College of the Pacific (AP-1; INS-1 [quarterback])
- Bob Celeri, California (AP-1; Coaches-1 [quarterback]; INS-2)
- Bill Martin, USC (AP-1; Coaches-1 [fullback])
- Don Paul, Washington State (AP-2; Coaches-1)
- Ernie Johnson, UCLA (AP-2; INS-1 [halfback])
- Ollie Matson, San Francisco (INS-1 [fullback])
- Hall Haynes, Santa Clara (AP-2; INS-2)
- Bob Sanders, Oregon (AP-2; INS-2)
- Harry Hugasian, Stanford (INS-2)

=== Ends ===
- Bob Wilkinson, UCLA (AP-1; Coaches-1; INS-1)
- Ray Bauer, Montana (Coaches-1)
- Darrell Robinson, Oregon (AP-1; INS-2)
- Bill McColl, Stanford (INS-1)
- Joe Cloidt, Washington (AP-2)
- Hal Hatfield, USC (AP-2)
- John Rohde, Pacific (INS-2)

=== Tackles ===
- Jim Turner, California (AP-1; Coaches-1; INS-1)
- Jim Cullom, California (AP-2; Coaches-1; INS-1)
- Carl Kiilsgaard, Idaho (AP-1)
- Gordon White, Stanford (AP-2)
- John Hock, Santa Clara (INS-2)
- Thomas Payne, Santa Clara (INS-2)

=== Guards ===
- Rod Franz, California (AP-1; Coaches-1; INS-1) (College Football Hall of Fame)
- Vern Sterling, Santa Clara (AP-1; INS-1)
- Ray Colquitt, Idaho (Coaches-1)
- Chet Daniels, Oregon (AP-2; INS-2)
- Jim Dowling, Santa Clara (AP-2)
- Adrian Swope, USC (INS-2)

=== Centers ===
- Jim Castagnoli, Stanford (AP-1; Coaches-1; INS-1)
- Leon McLaughlin, UCLA (AP-2; INS-2)

== Key ==
AP = Associated Press

Coaches = selected by the conference coaches

INS = International News Service

Bold = Consensus first-team selection of at least two selectors from the AP, Coaches and INS

== See also ==
- 1949 College Football All-America Team
