= Bill McColl =

American football player, surgeon and politician (1930–2023)

- McColl on a 1953 Bowman football card

No. 83
- Position: End

Personal information
- Born: April 2, 1930; San Diego, California, U.S.
- Died: December 28, 2023 (aged 93)
- Listed height: 6 ft 4 in (1.93 m)
- Listed weight: 230 lb (104 kg)

Career information
- High school: Hoover (San Diego)
- College: Stanford (1948–1951)
- NFL draft: 1952: 3rd round, 32nd overall pick

Career history
- Chicago Bears (1952–1959)

Awards and highlights
- UPI Lineman of the Year (1951); Unanimous All-American (1951); Consensus All-American (1950); Voit Trophy (1951); 3× First-team All-PCC (1949, 1950, 1951); California Mr. Basketball (1947)

Career NFL statistics
- Receptions: 201
- Receiving yards: 2,815
- Receiving touchdowns: 25
- Stats at Pro Football Reference
- College Football Hall of Fame

William Frazer McColl Jr. (April 2, 1930 – December 28, 2023) was an American athlete, surgeon, and politician. He is best remembered as a college football star before becoming a professional with the Chicago Bears of the National Football League (NFL), for whom he played from 1952 to 1959. He played college football for the Stanford Cardinal (for accuracy, Stanford teams were called the “Indians” when Mr. McColl played there, and until 1972) earning consensus All-American honors twice and finishing third runner-up in the 1951 Heisman Trophy voting. In 1951, he was the first person to receive the W.J. Voit Memorial Trophy as the outstanding football player on the Pacific Coast.

McColl was also a three-time candidate for United States Congress, running as a Republican in his native state of California.

McColl was inducted into the San Diego Hall of Champions Breitbard Hall of Fame in 1965. He was also inducted into the Stanford University Athletic Hall of Fame and into the College Football Hall of Fame in 1973.

== Early life ==
William Frazer McColl Jr., MD, known by the nickname "Bill," was born April 2, 1930, in San Diego, California, namesake of a Canadian-born father, Dr. William Frazer McColl, Sr. (1895-1969) of Georgetown, Ontario, and American Esther Anna De Vries McColl (1903-1967) of Illinois. McColl attended Hoover High School in San Diego, where the quick 6′4″, 210-pound (193 cm; 95 kg) youth was a multi-sport athlete, starring in baseball, basketball, track and field, and football. McColl was regarded as one of Southern California's top prep athletes of 1948, excelling in particular at football, in which his speed allowed him to get to the edge successfully on sweep plays, while his accurate arm made him his team's second most dangerous passer on option plays.

McColl was named as a first-team All-CIF football player for Southern California by the California Interscholastic Federation for 1947. In the spring of 1948 he repeated the honor, being named as an outfielder to the first-team All-CIF baseball squad. His commitment to Stanford University for the 1948–49 academic year was regarded as being a newsworthy event.

== College football career ==
Stanford right end Bill McColl successfully fights off USC defensive halfback (and future NFL Hall-of-Famer) Frank Gifford (L) for possession of a long pass in 1950 PCC game action.

McColl enrolled at Stanford University as a pre-medical student. Despite his academic schedule, he still helped to lead the Stanford junior varsity football team to an undefeated 5–0 record in 1948, including a 30–0 defeat of arch-rival Cal. United Press International described him as "one of the cleverest pass catchers to trod [sic] the soil this way in recent years".

In 1949 McColl played with the Stanford varsity for the first time. In his debut performance, finding the end zone on a nine-yard jump pass from Stanford Indians quarterback Gary Kerkorian in the third quarter while shining as a defensive star. Stanford rolled up San Jose State 49–0 in the game, helping to set a new tone for Stanford Indians football during McColl's collegiate career.

Playing both offense and defense in this era before free substitution, McColl began the 1950 season on defense as a defensive end, but was moved to the defensive tackle slot by head coach Marchie Schwartz in mid-October following the loss of two key players to knee injuries. The move proved successful and the 217-pounder (98 kg) was named as one of 11 members of the All-Pacific Coast football team by the International News Service, which reckoned him "one of the brightest sophomore ends to come along in a good many years." McColl's play was of such high caliber on both sides of the ball that more than once during the 1949 season he very nearly played complete 60-minute games, despite his newness to the varsity squad. Stanford would finish the season in third place in the Pacific Coast Conference with a 7–3–1 record, hitting #12 in the penultimate Associated Press Top 20 poll.

McColl's Junior year at Stanford, 1950, proved to be a personal breakout season although one that was less successful for his team. In addition to his offensive end and defensive tackle rolls, McColl shared duty as the Indians' kicker, experiencing the agony of a missed 46-yard field goal try against the Cal Bears in the 1950 "Big Game" — a 60-minute battle which ended up a 7–7 deadlock. Despite high hopes, including a #7 ranking on the pre-season Associated Press Top 20 poll, Stanford remained mired in the middle of the Pacific Coast Conference with a record of 5–3–2 (2–2–2 in conference). McColl's own play had garnered national notice, however, and the big end was named to seven of eight NCAA-recognized All-American teams.

Bill McColl became a two time All-American as a Senior at Stanford in 1951. He had bulked up still further going into his final collegiate campaign, tipping the scales at 225 pounds (102 kg) — massive for an end of his day. McColl's place as a star of the Stanford team was solidified by the continued development of future NFL quarterback Gary Kerkorian, who had long since made McColl his number one receiving target. Expectations for the Indians were down, with a pre-season coaches' poll predicting a 4th-place finish in the 9 team Pacific Coast Conference.

Barely slowed by a broken nose in pre-season practice, in September McColl scored a game-winning touchdown on a 28-yard option pass from halfback Harry Hugasian, en route to a 27–20 victory over the University of Oregon. An impressive win over the University of Michigan at Ann Arbor in front of more than 57,000 fans followed, with the Kerkorian-to-McColl combination reckoned to be the deciding factor in a 23–13 victory. McColl also garnered national attention for having contributed "impossible" catches in helping Stanford upset UCLA by a score of 21–7.

McColl notched another key touchdown on October 27 against the University of Washington when he grabbed a 14-yard pass from Kerkorian on 4th down late in the first half. Through seven games — all victories for Stanford — McColl was responsible for catching 6 of the team's seven TD passes, gaining 427 yards on 28 catches.

For his collegiate career achievement, McColl was named to the College Football Hall of Fame in 1973.

== Professional football career ==
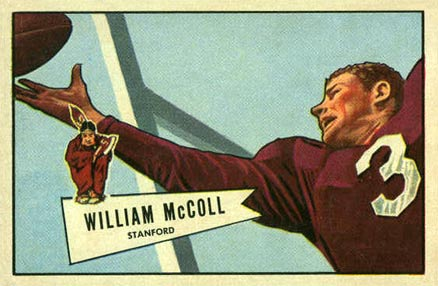
McColl on a 1952 Bowman football card.

Bill McColl was selected in the third round of the 1952 NFL draft, the 32nd pick overall. He was selected by George Halas's Chicago Bears — for whom he would play his entire eight-year National Football League career.

Switching from his collegiate number 3 to jersey number 83 in the pros, McColl would play in all 96 regular season games of his eight-year NFL career for the Bears. As a professional, he would catch 201 balls for more than 2,800 yards, including 25 receptions for touchdown.

In the 1956 NFL season, McColl threw the longest pass completion of the year (79 yards) in an end around pass against the New York Giants and had the sixth longest reception at 69 yards.

McColl's career year was his seventh in the league, 1958, during which he hauled down 35 passes for 517 yards. McColl's eight TD receptions in 1958 would place him third among receivers in the league, with only two co-leaders ahead of him with 9 touchdown grabs.

== Life after football ==
During his time with the Bears, McColl continued his medical education at the University of Chicago Medical School. He would become an orthopedic surgeon and serve in Korea as a Presbyterian missionary doctor from 1962 to 1964. He was recognized by the Pro Football Hall of Fame with a humanitarian award for his service and was voted one of the 10 Outstanding Young Men of America in 1964 by the United States Junior Chamber of Commerce.

In 1970, McColl ran in the Republican primary for a special election to fill California's 24th Congressional District in the eastern Los Angeles County region. The incumbent Republican, Congressman Glenard Lipscomb, had died and the election was to fill the vacancy for the remainder of the term. McColl ran a strong campaign and was involved in a close three way race with former congressmen John Rousselot and Patrick Hillings. Rousselot won, defeating McColl by 127 votes.

In 1972, McColl tried for congress again. He had moved to the Pasadena-Burbank-Glendale area, and he ran for the 20th Congressional District seat that was being vacated by retiring Republican Congressman Allen Smith. He finished second in the primary to state Assemblyman Carlos Moorhead, who went on to be elected to congress in November.

McColl made his third and final run for congress in 1982 in the newly created 43rd Congressional District near San Diego. In the Republican primary he once again ran a competitive campaign, but came in a close third to wealthy businessman Johnnie Crean, whom he refused to support due to Crean's false charges, and the eventual winner, Carlsbad Mayor Ron Packard.

== Personal life and death ==
McColl married the former Barbara Blanche Bird at Beverly Hills, California, in December 1953, and the couple returned to make a home in Chicago. They resided in San Diego where they lived from 1983 onwards. The pair would raise six children, two of whom — Duncan McColl and Milt McColl — would also play football at Stanford. Duncan and Bill McColl are the only father-son All-America football combination in Stanford history. Duncan and Milt both went on to the NFL.

Bill McColl died on December 28, 2023, at the age of 93.
