= Bob Wilkinson =

American football player (1927–2016)

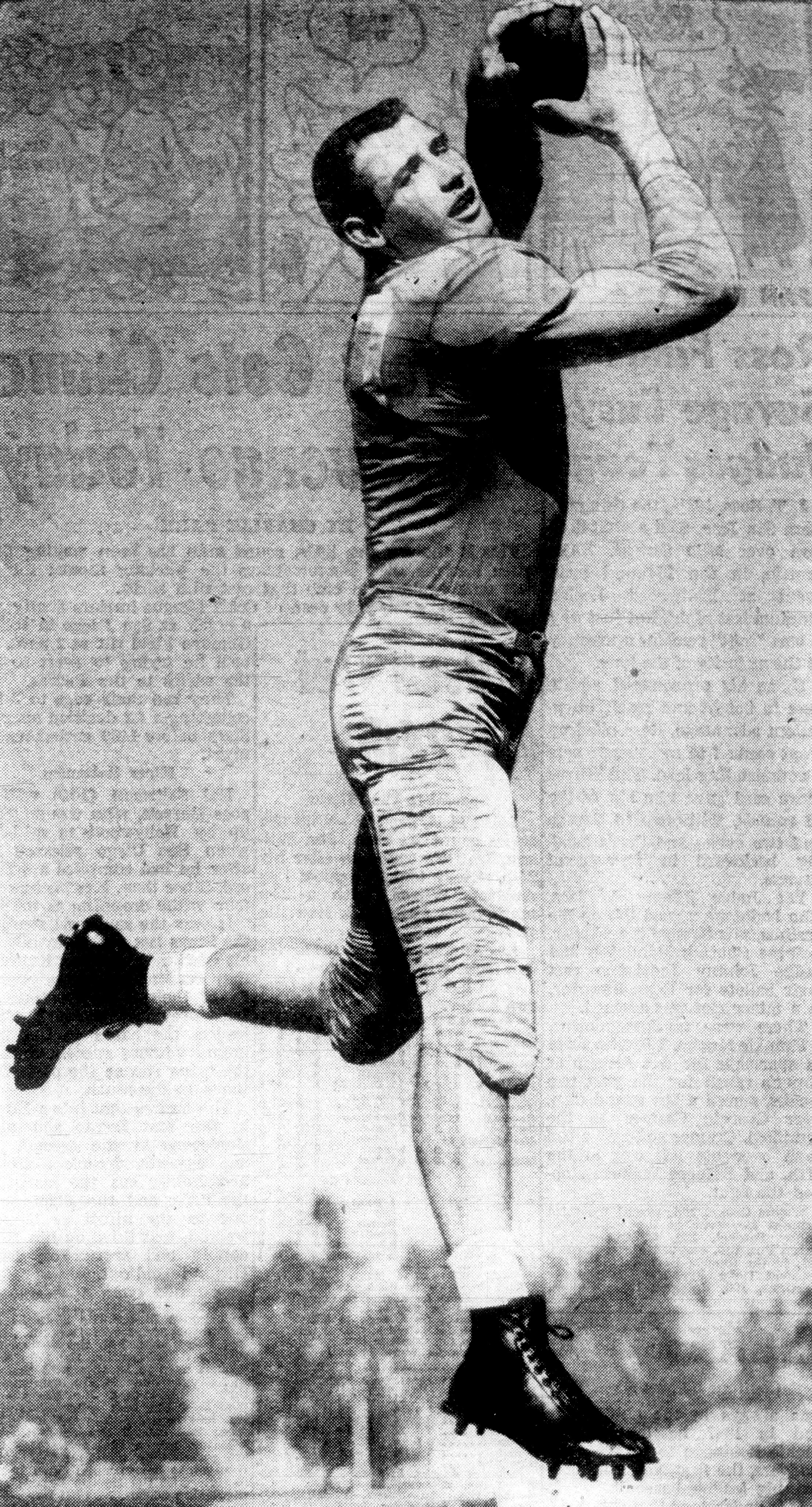
- Wilkinson, circa 1950

No. 87
- Positions: End, defensive back, halfback

Personal information
- Born: October 8, 1927; Los Angeles, California, U.S.
- Died: September 12, 2016 (aged 88); Scottsdale, Arizona, U.S.
- Listed height: 6 ft 3 in (1.91 m)
- Listed weight: 215 lb (98 kg)

Career information
- High school: Loyola (Los Angeles)
- College: UCLA
- NFL draft: 1950: 10th round, 124th overall pick

Career history
- New York Giants (1951–1952)

Awards and highlights
- 2× First-team All-PCC (1949, 1950)

Career NFL statistics
- Rushing yards: 26
- Rushing average: 1
- Receptions: 17
- Receiving yards: 330
- Total touchdowns: 3
- Stats at Pro Football Reference

Robert Raymond Wilkinson (October 8, 1927 – September 12, 2016) was an American professional football end who played for the New York Giants. He played college football at the University of California, Los Angeles, having previously attended Loyola High School in Los Angeles, California. He died of complications of Parkinson's disease in 2016.
