= Pat Cannamela =

American football player (1929–1973)

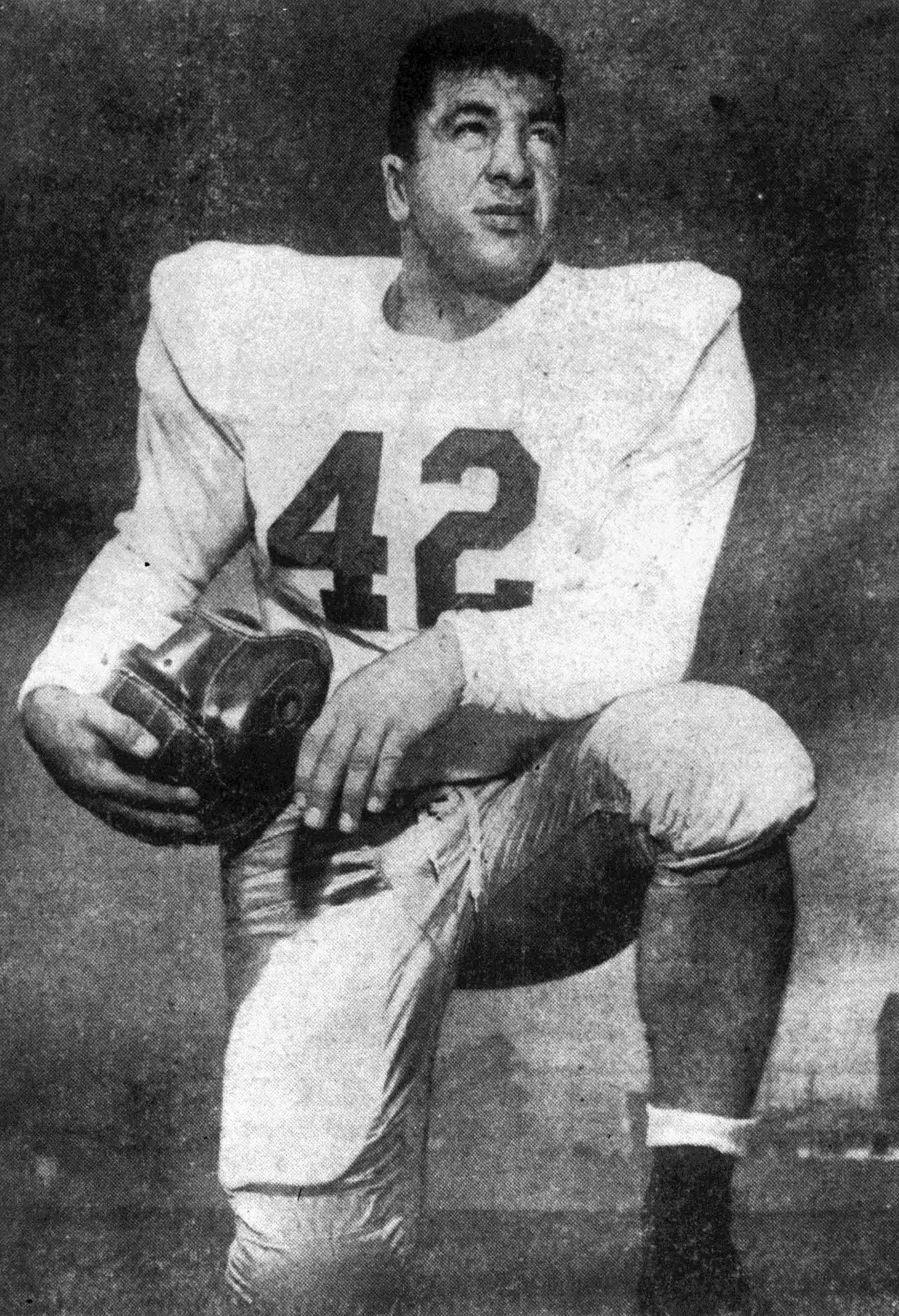
- Cannamela, circa 1950

No. 35, 61
- Positions: Guard, linebacker

Personal information
- Born: April 27, 1929; New London, Connecticut, U.S.
- Died: January 28, 1973 (aged 43); Los Angeles, California, U.S.
- Listed height: 6 ft 0 in (1.83 m)
- Listed weight: 195 lb (88 kg)

Career information
- High school: Chapman Tech (New London)
- College: Ventura College (1948–1949); USC (1950–1951)
- NFL draft: 1952: 11th round, 122nd overall pick

Career history
- Dallas Texans (1952); Ottawa Rough Riders (1956)

Awards and highlights
- First-team All-American (1951); Second-team All-American (1950); First-team All-PCC (1951); Second-team All-PCC (1950)

Career NFL statistics
- Fumble recoveries: 2
- Stats at Pro Football Reference

Patterson N. Cannamela (April 27, 1929 – January 28, 1973) was an American professional football player. A native of New London, Connecticut, Cannamela moved west and enrolled in Ventura College in 1948 and played football there during the 1948 and 1949 season. He won a scholarship to the University of Southern California in 1950 and played at the guard and linebacker positions for the USC Trojans football team during the 1950 and 1951 seasons. He was selected by the Football Writers Association of America, the International News Service, and the Newspaper Enterprise Association as a first-team player on their 1951 College Football All-America Teams. He was drafted 122nd overall by the Dallas Texans in the 11th round of the 1952 NFL draft and played for the Texans as a linebacker during the 1952 NFL season. In 1973, Cannamela was shot and killed during a robbery at the Zody's Discount Store on Sunset Boulevard in Los Angeles, where he was working as an appliance salesman. He was posthumously inducted into the USC Athletic Hall of Fame in 2007.
