= Bob Moser =

American football player (1928–1988)

No. 55
- Position: Center

Personal information
- Born: December 26, 1928; Modesto, California, U.S.
- Died: May 7, 1988 (aged 59); Chicago, Illinois, U.S.
- Listed height: 6 ft 3 in (1.91 m)
- Listed weight: 240 lb (109 kg)

Career information
- High school: Oakdale (Oakdale, California)
- College: Pacific
- NFL draft: 1951: 4th round, 47th overall pick

Career history
- Chicago Bears (1951–1953)

Awards and highlights
- Second-team All-Pacific Coast (1950)
- Stats at Pro Football Reference

Robert Joseph Moser (December 26, 1928 – May 7, 1988) was an American professional football center who played for the Chicago Bears of the National Football League (NFL). He played college football for the Pacific Tigers and was selected by the Bears in the fourth round of the 1951 NFL draft.

== Early life ==
Robert Joseph Moser was born on December 26, 1928, in Modesto, California. He attended Oakdale High School in Oakdale, California.

== College career ==
Moser played junior college football at Stockton Junior College in 1947. He transferred to the College of the Pacific, where he was a three-year letterman for the Tigers from 1948 to 1950. He earned Associated Press second-team All-Pacific Coast honors as a senior in 1950.

== Professional career ==
Moser was selected by the Chicago Bears in the fourth round, with the 47th overall pick, of the 1951 NFL draft. He played in 30 games, starting two, for the Bears from 1951 to 1953 and recovered four fumbles for six yards.

== Personal life ==
Moser died on May 7, 1988, in Chicago.
