= Russ Pomeroy =

American football player (1927–2019)

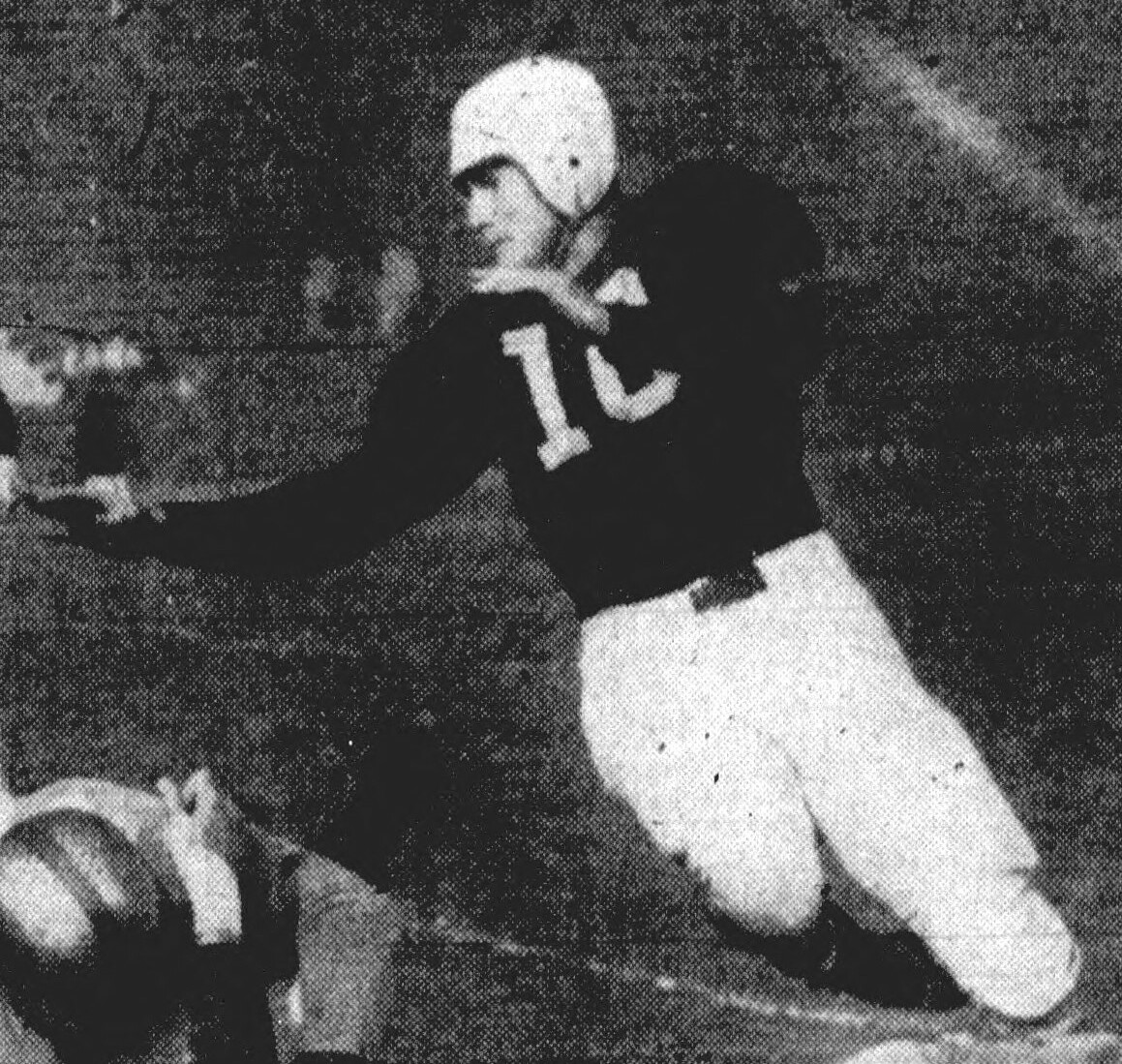
- Pomeroy in 1950

Stanford Indians
- Positions: Linebacker, guard

Personal information
- Born: June 23, 1927; Fontenelle, Wyoming, U.S.
- Died: April 6, 2019 (aged 91); Highlands Ranch, Colorado, U.S.
- Listed height: 6 ft 0 in (1.83 m)
- Listed weight: 208 lb (94 kg)

Career information
- High school: Whittier Union (CA)
- College: Stanford (1949–1950)

Awards and highlights
- Pop Warner Trophy (1950); First-team All-PCC (1950)

Russell Alfred Pomeroy (June 23, 1927 – April 6, 2019) was an American football linebacker and guard who played who played for Stanford from 1949 to 1950.

Pomeroy was born in 1927 on a ranch in Fontenelle, Wyoming. He attended Whittier Union High School in Whittier, California. He served in the U.S. Merchant Marines and also as a U.S. Army paratrooper.

In 1950, he received the Pop Warner Trophy as the outstanding senior football player on the West Coast. He was also selected by both the Associated Press (AP), the United Press (UP), and the conference coaches as a first-team linebacker on the 1950 All-Pacific Coast football team.

Pomeroy received a degree in petroleum geology and spent his career working in oil and gas exploration in Wyoming, Colorado, and Utah. He worked for many years for Occidental Petroleum before forming his own company, Sunburst Exploration, developing oil fields in Utah and Colorado.
