= Duncan McColl =

American pastor and former professional footballer

Profile
- Position: Defensive end

Personal information
- Born: August 30, 1955 (age 71); Covina, California, U.S.
- Listed height: 6 ft 4 in (1.93 m)
- Listed weight: 237 lb (108 kg)

Career information
- High school: South Hills (West Covina, California)
- College: Stanford
- NFL draft: 1977: 4th round, 97th overall pick

Career history
- Washington Redskins (1977); San Francisco 49ers (1979)*
- * Offseason or practice squad member only

Duncan McColl (born c. 1955) is a Presbyterian Church USA pastor and former professional football player.

McColl was selected 97th overall by the Washington Redskins as their first pick in the 1977 NFL draft, moved to the injured reserve list in September 1977, and waived in August 1978. He signed with the San Francisco 49ers on May 2, 1979, but was later released.

McColl played college football for Stanford University, following in the footsteps of his father, Dr. William Frazer McColl Jr. (1930–2023); they are "the only father-son All-American football combination in Stanford history". His brother Milt McColl also played, as did nephew Daniel McColl. His daughter Meredith and son Will both played water polo at Stanford.

Having studied Business Management at UCLA, he and his wife Emily, both enrolled at Princeton Theological Seminary following the death of an infant son. Both graduated and were ordained on June 30, 1996 and both have served congregations in the San Diego Presbytery. As of August 2018, he is the pastor at Mira Mesa Presbyterian Church in San Diego. McColl spent a couple of years of his childhood with his family in Korea, as his father served with the UPCUSA as a Medical Missionary, an orthopedic surgeon at a Leprosy Hospital, following his NFL Career.
