= Harry Hugasian =

American football player (1929–2016)

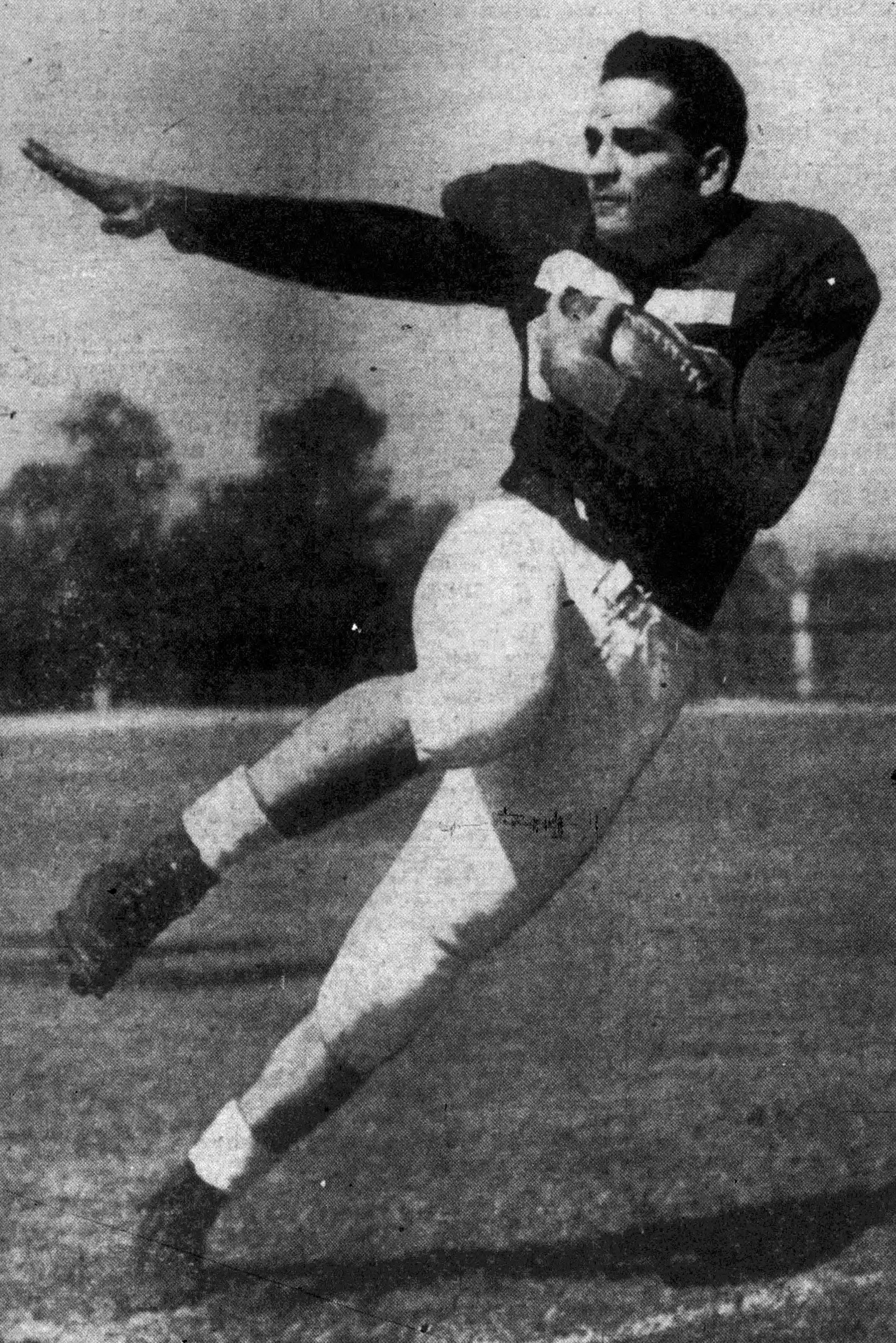
- Hugasian, circa 1951

No. 31, 48
- Positions: Halfback, defensive back

Personal information
- Born: August 29, 1929; Pasadena, California, U.S.
- Died: September 3, 2016 (aged 87); Arcadia, California, U.S.
- Listed height: 6 ft 1 in (1.85 m)
- Listed weight: 192 lb (87 kg)

Career information
- High school: Pasadena; South Milwaukee (WI)
- College: Stanford (1948–1951)
- NFL draft: 1952: 21st round, 242nd overall pick

Career history
- Chicago Bears (1955); Baltimore Colts (1955)

Awards and highlights
- Second-team All-PCC (1949)

Career NFL statistics
- Rushing yards: 34
- Rushing average: 2.8
- Receptions: 3
- Receiving yards: 32
- Stats at Pro Football Reference

Harry Hugasian (August 29, 1929 – September 3, 2016) was an American professional football guard who played for the Chicago Bears and Baltimore Colts. He played college football at Stanford University, having previously attended South Milwaukee High School and Pasadena High School. He was of Armenian descent. Hugasian died on September 3, 2016, at the age of 87.
