= 1987 Penn State Nittany Lions football team =

American college football season

1987 Penn State Nittany Lions football

Florida Citrus Bowl, L 10–35 vs. Clemson
- Conference: Independent
- Record: 8–4
- Head coach: Joe Paterno (22nd season)
- Offensive coordinator: Fran Ganter (4th season)
- Offensive scheme: Pro-style
- Defensive coordinator: Jerry Sandusky (11th season)
- Base defense: 4–3
- Captains: Trey Bauer; Marques Henderson; Matt Knizner
- Home stadium: Beaver Stadium

1987 Major eastern college football independents records
	Conf.					Overall
Team	W		L		T	W		L		T
No. 4 Syracuse $	5	–	0	–	0	11	–	0	–	1
Penn State	4	–	2	–	0	8	–	4	–	0
Pittsburgh	3	–	3	–	0	8	–	4	–	0
West Virginia	2	–	3	–	0	6	–	6	–	0
Rutgers	2	–	4	–	0	6	–	5	–	0
Boston College	2	–	4	–	0	5	–	6	–	0
Temple	1	–	3	–	0	3	–	8	–	0
$ – Lambert Trophy Winner; Rankings from AP Poll

1987 NCAA Division I-A independents football records
	Conf.					Overall
Team	W		L		T	W		L		T
No. 1 Miami (FL)		–		–		12	–	0	–	0
No. 4 Syracuse		–		–		11	–	0	–	1
No. 2 Florida State		–		–		11	–	1	–	0
No. 15 South Carolina		–		–		8	–	4	–	0
Pittsburgh		–		–		8	–	4	–	0
Penn State		–		–		8	–	4	–	0
No. 17 Notre Dame		–		–		8	–	4	–	0
Southern Miss		–		–		6	–	5	–	0
Rutgers		–		–		6	–	5	–	0
Southwestern Louisiana		–		–		6	–	5	–	0
Memphis State		–		–		5	–	5	–	1
Northern Illinois		–		–		5	–	5	–	1
West Virginia		–		–		6	–	6	–	0
Tulane		–		–		6	–	6	–	0
Army		–		–		5	–	6	–	0
Boston College		–		–		5	–	6	–	0
East Carolina		–		–		5	–	6	–	0
Akron		–		–		4	–	7	–	0
Cincinnati		–		–		4	–	7	–	0
Louisville		–		–		3	–	7	–	1
Temple		–		–		3	–	8	–	0
Tulsa		–		–		3	–	8	–	0
Virginia Tech		–		–		2	–	9	–	0
Navy		–		–		2	–	9	–	0
Rankings from AP Poll

The 1987 Penn State Nittany Lions football team represented the Pennsylvania State University as an independent during the 1987 NCAA Division I-A football season. Led by 22nd-year head coach Joe Paterno, the Nittany Lions compiled a record of 8–4. Penn State was invited to the Florida Citrus Bowl, where the Nittany Lions lost to Clemson. The team played home games at Beaver Stadium in University Park, Pennsylvania.

== Schedule ==
Date	Time	Opponent	Rank	Site	TV	Result	Attendance	Source
September 5	1:00 p.m.	Bowling Green	No. 11	Beaver Stadium; University Park, PA		W 45–19	84,574	
September 12	8:10 p.m.	No. 19 Alabama	No. 11	Beaver Stadium; University Park, PA (rivalry)	CBS	L 13–24	85,619	
September 19	1:00 p.m.	Cincinnati	No. 20	Beaver Stadium; University Park, PA		W 41–0	82,000	
September 26	7:45 p.m.	at Boston College	No. 15	Sullivan Stadium; Foxborough, MA	ESPN	W 27–17	50,267	
October 3	1:00 p.m.	Temple	No. 14	Beaver Stadium; University Park, PA		W 27–13	84,000	
October 10	1:00 p.m.	Rutgers^{†}	No. 14	Beaver Stadium; University Park, PA		W 35–21	85,376	
October 17	2:45 p.m.	at No. 13 Syracuse	No. 10	Carrier Dome; Syracuse, NY (rivalry)	CBS	L 21–48	50,011	
October 31	1:00 p.m.	West Virginia	No. 18	Beaver Stadium; University Park, PA (rivalry)		W 25–21	85,108	
November 7	1:00 p.m.	at Maryland	No. 16	Memorial Stadium; Baltimore, MD (rivalry)		W 21–16	62,500	
November 14	7:45 p.m.	at Pittsburgh	No. 15	Pitt Stadium; Pittsburgh, PA (rivalry)	ESPN	L 0–10	56,500	
November 21	12:00 p.m.	No. 7 Notre Dame		Beaver Stadium; University Park, PA (rivalry)	CBS	W 21–20	84,000	
January 1, 1988	12:00 p.m.	vs. No. 14 Clemson	No. 20	Florida Citrus Bowl; Orlando, FL (Florida Citrus Bowl)	ABC	L 10–35	53,152	
^{†}Homecoming; Rankings from AP Poll released prior to the game; All times are in Eastern time

== Game summaries ==
=== Notre Dame ===
Team	1	2	3	4	Total
Notre Dame	7	0	7	6	20
• Penn St	7	7	0	7	21

- Date: November 21
- Location: Beaver Stadium, University Park, Pennsylvania
- Game attendance: 84,000

Scoring summary
Q1	PSU	Greene 10 yard run (Taurasi kick)	PSU 7–0
Q1	ND	Rice 32 yard run (Gradel kick)	Tie 7–7
Q2	PSU	Thomas 1 yard run (Etze kick)	PSU 14–7
Q3	ND	Rice 11 yard run (Gradel kick)	Tie 14–14
Q4	PSU	Greene 3 yard run (Taurasi kick)	PSU 21–14
Q4	ND	Johnson 1 yard run (run failed)	PSU 21–20

- Blair Thomas 35 Rush, 214 Yds

== Roster ==
1987 Penn State Nittany Lions football team roster
Players
Coaches
Offense

Pos.	#	Name	Class
WR	9	Mike Alexander	Sr
QB	12	Tom Bill	Fr
FB	27	Gary Brown	Fr
OT	74	Stan Clayton	Sr
WR	26	David Daniels	Fr
C	78	Roger Duffy	So
TE	89	Bob Mrosko	Jr
TE	88	Paul Pomfret	Sr
WR	6	Ray Roundtree	Sr
G	79	Dave Szott	So
RB	32	Blair Thomas	So
WR	5	Michael Timpson	Jr
G	66	Steve Wisniewski	Jr
C	72	Mike Wolf	Sr

Defense

Pos.	#	Name	Class
LB	35	Trey Bauer	Sr
NT	70	Darryl Bullock	Jr
LB	31	Andre Collins	So
DT	73	Pete Curkendall	Sr
DT	85	Frank Giannetti	Fr
LB	90	Pete Giftopoulos	Sr
S	3	Marques Henderson	Sr
LB	84	Keith Karpinski	Jr
LB	92	Quintus McDonald	Jr
LB	33	John Sweenely	Jr
CB	19	Gary Wilkerson	Jr

Special teams

Pos.	#	Name	Class

Head coach

- Joe Paterno

Coordinators/assistant coaches

- Tom Bradley
- Jim Caldwell
- Craig Cirbus
- Chet Fuhrman
- Ron Dickerson
- Fran Ganter
- Nick Gasparato
- Joe Sarra
- Jerry Sandusky
- Paul Shaffner (GA)
- Jim Williams

Legend

- (C) Team captain
- (S) Suspended
- (I) Ineligible
- Injured
- Redshirt

Roster

== NFL draft ==
Four Nittany Lions were drafted in the 1988 NFL draft.

Round	Pick	Overall	Name	Position	Team
3rd	3	58	Ray Roundtree	Wide receiver	Detroit Lions
8th	6	199	Mike Alexander	Wide receiver	Los Angeles Raiders
10th	1	250	Stan Clayton	Offensive tackle	Atlanta Falcons
11th	11	289	Pete Curkendall	Defensive line	Buffalo Bills
