= 1987 Syracuse Orangemen football team =

American college football season

1987 Syracuse Orangemen football

Lambert-Meadowlands Trophy

Sugar Bowl, T 16–16 vs. Auburn
- Conference: Independent

Ranking
- Coaches: No. 4
- AP: No. 4
- Record: 11–0–1
- Head coach: Dick MacPherson (7th season)
- Offensive coordinator: George DeLeone (1st season)
- Captains: Paul Frase; Ted Gregory; Don McPherson
- Home stadium: Carrier Dome

1987 Major eastern college football independents records
	Conf.					Overall
Team	W		L		T	W		L		T
No. 4 Syracuse $	5	–	0	–	0	11	–	0	–	1
Penn State	4	–	2	–	0	8	–	4	–	0
Pittsburgh	3	–	3	–	0	8	–	4	–	0
West Virginia	2	–	3	–	0	6	–	6	–	0
Rutgers	2	–	4	–	0	6	–	5	–	0
Boston College	2	–	4	–	0	5	–	6	–	0
Temple	1	–	3	–	0	3	–	8	–	0
$ – Lambert Trophy Winner; Rankings from AP Poll

1987 NCAA Division I-A independents football records
	Conf.					Overall
Team	W		L		T	W		L		T
No. 1 Miami (FL)		–		–		12	–	0	–	0
No. 4 Syracuse		–		–		11	–	0	–	1
No. 2 Florida State		–		–		11	–	1	–	0
No. 15 South Carolina		–		–		8	–	4	–	0
Pittsburgh		–		–		8	–	4	–	0
Penn State		–		–		8	–	4	–	0
No. 17 Notre Dame		–		–		8	–	4	–	0
Southern Miss		–		–		6	–	5	–	0
Rutgers		–		–		6	–	5	–	0
Southwestern Louisiana		–		–		6	–	5	–	0
Memphis State		–		–		5	–	5	–	1
Northern Illinois		–		–		5	–	5	–	1
West Virginia		–		–		6	–	6	–	0
Tulane		–		–		6	–	6	–	0
Army		–		–		5	–	6	–	0
Boston College		–		–		5	–	6	–	0
East Carolina		–		–		5	–	6	–	0
Akron		–		–		4	–	7	–	0
Cincinnati		–		–		4	–	7	–	0
Louisville		–		–		3	–	7	–	1
Temple		–		–		3	–	8	–	0
Tulsa		–		–		3	–	8	–	0
Virginia Tech		–		–		2	–	9	–	0
Navy		–		–		2	–	9	–	0
Rankings from AP Poll

The 1987 Syracuse Orangemen football team represented Syracuse University as an independent during the 1987 NCAA Division I-A football season. Led by eighth-year head coach Dick MacPherson, the Orangemen compiled a record of 11–0–1 and tied Auburn in the Sugar Bowl. The 11 wins by the Orangemen matched the school record set by the national champion 1959 team, and their No. 4 ranking in the final AP poll was the first ranked finish since 1961. The team played home games at the Carrier Dome in Syracuse, New York.

== Schedule ==
Date	Opponent	Rank	Site	TV	Result	Attendance	Source
September 5	Maryland		Carrier Dome; Syracuse, NY		W 25–11	35,234	
September 12	at Rutgers		Rutgers Stadium; Piscataway, NJ		W 20–3	23,726	
September 19	Miami (OH)		Carrier Dome; Syracuse, NY		W 24–10	33,838	
September 26	at Virginia Tech		Lane Stadium; Blacksburg, VA		W 35–21	33,300	
October 3	at Missouri		Faurot Field; Columbia, MO		W 24–13	36,773	
October 17	No. 10 Penn State	No. 13	Carrier Dome; Syracuse, NY (rivalry)	CBS	W 48–21	50,011	
October 24	Colgate	No. 9	Carrier Dome; Syracuse, NY (rivalry)		W 52–6	48,097	
October 31	at Pittsburgh	No. 8	Pitt Stadium; Pittsburgh, PA (rivalry)	CBS	W 24–10	52,714	
November 7	at Navy	No. 8	Navy–Marine Corps Memorial Stadium; Annapolis, MD		W 34–10	26,614	
November 14	Boston College	No. 6	Carrier Dome; Syracuse, NY		W 45–17	49,892	
November 21	West Virginia	No. 6	Carrier Dome; Syracuse, NY (rivalry)		W 32–31	49,866	
January 1	vs. No. 6 Auburn	No. 4	Louisiana Superdome; New Orleans, LA (Sugar Bowl)	ABC	T 16–16	75,495	
Rankings from AP Poll released prior to the game

== Roster ==
1987 Syracuse Orange football team roster
Players
Coaches
Offense

Pos.	#	Name	Class
RB	36	Robert Drummond	Jr
RB	32	Daryl Johnston	Jr
WR		Tommy Kane	Sr
TE	84	Pat Kelly	Sr
QB	9	Don McPherson	Sr
QB	5	Todd Philcox	Jr

Defense

Pos.	#	Name	Class
LB		David Bavaro	So
DT		Fred DeRiggi	So
DT	94	Paul Frase	Sr
NG	93	Ted Gregory	Sr
DB	10	Markus Paul	Jr
LB	90	Terry Wooden	So

Special teams

Pos.	#	Name	Class
P	4	Jim Fox	Sr

Head coach

- Dick MacPherson

Coordinators/assistant coaches

Legend

- (C) Team captain
- (S) Suspended
- (I) Ineligible
- Injured
- Redshirt

== Awards and honors ==
- Dick MacPherson, Bobby Dodd Coach of the Year Award
- Dick MacPherson, Eddie Robinson Coach of the Year Award
- Dick MacPherson, Paul Bear Bryant Award
- Dick MacPherson, Walter Camp Coach of the Year Award
- Don McPherson, Sammy Baugh Trophy
- Don McPherson, Maxwell Award
- Don McPherson, Davey O’Brien Award
- Don McPherson, Johnny Unitas Golden Arm Award
- Don McPherson, Second in Heisman Trophy voting
- Don McPherson, unanimous first team All-American (AP, UPI, AFCA, FWAA, WCF, SN)
- Ted Gregory, consensus first team All-American (FWAA, UPI, SN, FN, PFW)
- Tommy Kane, Sporting News second team All-American

== 1987 team players in the NFL ==
Player	Round	Pick	Position	Club
Ted Gregory	1	26	Nose guard	Denver Broncos
Tommy Kane	3	75	Wide receiver	Seattle Seahawks
Paul Frase	6	146	Defensive tackle	New York Jets
Don McPherson	6	149	Quarterback	Philadelphia Eagles
Pat Kelly	7	174	Tight end	Denver Broncos
Tim Vesling	12	327	Kicker	Indianapolis Colts
