= 1987 Tulsa Golden Hurricane football team =

American college football season

1987 Tulsa Golden Hurricane football
- Conference: Independent
- Record: 3–8
- Head coach: George Henshaw (1st season)
- Defensive coordinator: Bob Brush (1st season)
- Home stadium: Skelly Stadium

1987 NCAA Division I-A independents football records
	Conf.					Overall
Team	W		L		T	W		L		T
No. 1 Miami (FL)		–		–		12	–	0	–	0
No. 4 Syracuse		–		–		11	–	0	–	1
No. 2 Florida State		–		–		11	–	1	–	0
No. 15 South Carolina		–		–		8	–	4	–	0
Pittsburgh		–		–		8	–	4	–	0
Penn State		–		–		8	–	4	–	0
No. 17 Notre Dame		–		–		8	–	4	–	0
Southern Miss		–		–		6	–	5	–	0
Rutgers		–		–		6	–	5	–	0
Southwestern Louisiana		–		–		6	–	5	–	0
Memphis State		–		–		5	–	5	–	1
Northern Illinois		–		–		5	–	5	–	1
West Virginia		–		–		6	–	6	–	0
Tulane		–		–		6	–	6	–	0
Army		–		–		5	–	6	–	0
Boston College		–		–		5	–	6	–	0
East Carolina		–		–		5	–	6	–	0
Akron		–		–		4	–	7	–	0
Cincinnati		–		–		4	–	7	–	0
Louisville		–		–		3	–	7	–	1
Temple		–		–		3	–	8	–	0
Tulsa		–		–		3	–	8	–	0
Virginia Tech		–		–		2	–	9	–	0
Navy		–		–		2	–	9	–	0
Rankings from AP Poll

The 1987 Tulsa Golden Hurricane football team represented the University of Tulsa as an independent during the 1987 NCAA Division I-A football season. In their first and only year under head coach George Henshaw, the Golden Hurricane compiled a 3–8 record. The team's statistical leaders included quarterback T. J. Rubley with 2,058 passing yards, Derrick Ellison with 593 rushing yards, and Dan Bitson with 608 receiving yards.

== Schedule ==
Date	Opponent	Site	Result	Attendance	Source
September 5	at Oklahoma State	Lewis Field; Stillwater, OK (rivalry)	L 28–39	46,700	
September 12	at Florida	Florida Field; Gainesville, FL	L 0–52	72,173	
September 19	at No. 12 Arkansas	Razorback Stadium; Fayetteville, AR	L 15–30	46,418	
September 26	No. 1 Oklahoma	Skelly Stadium; Tulsa, OK	L 0–65	47,350	
October 3	at Kansas State	KSU Stadium; Manhattan, KS	W 37–25	28,400	
October 10	at Temple	Veterans Stadium; Philadelphia, PA	W 24–17	20,008	
October 17	at Central Michigan	Kelly/Shorts Stadium; Mount Pleasant, MI	L 18–41	19,612	
October 24	at Texas Tech	Jones Stadium; Lubbock, TX	L 7–42	24,341	
October 31	Louisville^{†}	Skelly Stadium; Tulsa, OK	W 26–22	19,742	
November 7	Northern Arizona	Skelly Stadium; Tulsa, OK	L 20–24	10,863	
November 21	Memphis State	Skelly Stadium; Tulsa, OK	L 0–14	18,612	
^{†}Homecoming; Rankings from AP Poll released prior to the game

== Roster ==
1987 Tulsa Golden Hurricane football team roster
Players
Coaches
Offense

Pos.	#	Name	Class
TE	85	Mike Anderson	So
WR	29	Dan Bitson	Fr
RB	16	Derrick Ellison	Jr
WR	3	Erick Harrison	Jr
QB	11	T. J. Rubley	Fr

Defense

Pos.	#	Name	Class
DT	48	Dennis Byrd	Jr
DE	84	Donnie Dee	Sr
SS	6	Doug Desherow	Sr
LB	34	David Haynes	Sr
DB	22	Mickey Price	So

Special teams

Pos.	#	Name	Class

Head coach

- George Henshaw

Coordinators/assistant coaches

- Bob Brush
  (Defensive coordinator)

Legend

- (C) Team captain
- (S) Suspended
- (I) Ineligible
- Injured
- Redshirt

== After the season ==
=== 1988 NFL draft ===
The following Golden Hurricane player was selected in the 1988 NFL draft following the season.

Round	Pick	Player	Position	NFL club
11	297	Donnie Dee	Tight end	Indianapolis Colts
