= 1987 Pittsburgh Panthers football team =

American college football season

1987 Pittsburgh Panthers football

Astro-Bluebonnet Bowl, L 27–32 vs. Texas
- Conference: Independent
- Record: 8–4
- Head coach: Mike Gottfried (2nd season)
- Offensive coordinator: Mike Dickens (1st season)
- Offensive scheme: Multiple pro-style
- Defensive coordinator: John Fox (2nd season)
- Base defense: 4–3
- Home stadium: Pitt Stadium

1987 Major eastern college football independents records
	Conf.					Overall
Team	W		L		T	W		L		T
No. 4 Syracuse $	5	–	0	–	0	11	–	0	–	1
Penn State	4	–	2	–	0	8	–	4	–	0
Pittsburgh	3	–	3	–	0	8	–	4	–	0
West Virginia	2	–	3	–	0	6	–	6	–	0
Rutgers	2	–	4	–	0	6	–	5	–	0
Boston College	2	–	4	–	0	5	–	6	–	0
Temple	1	–	3	–	0	3	–	8	–	0
$ – Lambert Trophy Winner; Rankings from AP Poll

1987 NCAA Division I-A independents football records
	Conf.					Overall
Team	W		L		T	W		L		T
No. 1 Miami (FL)		–		–		12	–	0	–	0
No. 4 Syracuse		–		–		11	–	0	–	1
No. 2 Florida State		–		–		11	–	1	–	0
No. 15 South Carolina		–		–		8	–	4	–	0
Pittsburgh		–		–		8	–	4	–	0
Penn State		–		–		8	–	4	–	0
No. 17 Notre Dame		–		–		8	–	4	–	0
Southern Miss		–		–		6	–	5	–	0
Rutgers		–		–		6	–	5	–	0
Southwestern Louisiana		–		–		6	–	5	–	0
Memphis State		–		–		5	–	5	–	1
Northern Illinois		–		–		5	–	5	–	1
West Virginia		–		–		6	–	6	–	0
Tulane		–		–		6	–	6	–	0
Army		–		–		5	–	6	–	0
Boston College		–		–		5	–	6	–	0
East Carolina		–		–		5	–	6	–	0
Akron		–		–		4	–	7	–	0
Cincinnati		–		–		4	–	7	–	0
Louisville		–		–		3	–	7	–	1
Temple		–		–		3	–	8	–	0
Tulsa		–		–		3	–	8	–	0
Virginia Tech		–		–		2	–	9	–	0
Navy		–		–		2	–	9	–	0
Rankings from AP Poll

The 1987 Pittsburgh Panthers football team represented the University of Pittsburgh as an independent during the 1987 NCAA Division I-A football season.

== Schedule ==
Date	Time	Opponent	Rank	Site	TV	Result	Attendance	Source
September 2	7:30 p.m.	at BYU		Cougar Stadium; Provo, UT	ESPN	W 27–17	64,374	
September 12	1:30 p.m.	NC State	No. 18	Pitt Stadium; Pittsburgh, PA		W 34–0	43,165	
September 19	1:30 p.m.	Temple	No. 16	Pitt Stadium; Pittsburgh, PA		L 21–24	45,387	
September 26	12:00 p.m.	at West Virginia		Mountaineer Field; Morgantown, WV (Backyard Brawl)	JP Sports	W 6–3	65,079	
October 3	1:30 p.m.	Boston College		Pitt Stadium; Pittsburgh, PA		L 10–13	46,238	
October 10	7:30 p.m.	No. 4 Notre Dame		Pitt Stadium; Pittsburgh, PA (rivalry)	ESPN	W 30–22	56,400	
October 24	12:00 p.m.	at Navy		Navy–Marine Corps Memorial Stadium; Annapolis, MD	JP Sports	W 10–6	29,167	
October 31	3:30 p.m.	No. 8 Syracuse^{†}		Pitt Stadium; Pittsburgh, PA (rivalry)	CBS	L 10–24	52,714	
November 7	12:00 p.m.	at Rutgers		Giants Stadium; East Rutherford, NJ		W 17–0	25,444	
November 14	7:30 p.m.	No. 15 Penn State		Pitt Stadium; Pittsburgh, PA (rivalry)	ESPN	W 10–0	56,500	
November 21	1:30 p.m.	Kent State	No. 19	Pitt Stadium; Pittsburgh, PA		W 28–5	35,472	
December 31	7:00 p.m.	vs. Texas	No. 19	Houston Astrodome; Houston, TX (Astro-Bluebonnet Bowl)	Mizlou	L 27–32	33,122	
^{†}Homecoming; Rankings from AP Poll released prior to the game; All times are in Eastern time

== Game summaries ==
=== Notre Dame ===
Team	1	2	3	4	Total
Notre Dame	0	0	7	15	22
• Pittsburgh	14	13	0	3	30

- Date: October 10
- Location: Pitt Stadium, Pittsburgh, Pennsylvania
- Game attendance: 56,400

Scoring summary
Q1	PITT	Osborn 30 yard pass from Genilla (kick failed)	PITT 7–0
Q1	PITT	Heyward 1 yard run (Williams pass from Genilla)	PITT 14–0
Q2	PITT	Genilla 2 yard run (VanHorne kick)	PITT 21–0
Q2	PITT	Heyward 1 yard run (kick failed)	PITT 27–0
Q3	ND	Rice 16 yard run (Gradel kick)	PITT 27–7
Q4	ND	Banks 1 yard run (Gradel kick)	PITT 27–14
Q4	PITT	VanHorne 20 yard field goal	PITT 30–14
Q4	ND	Green 17 yard run (Brown run)	PITT 30–22

- Craig Heyward 42 Rush, 132 Yds

== Roster ==
1987 Pittsburgh Panthers football team roster
Players
Coaches
Offense

Pos.	#	Name	Class
C	55	Bryan Schoch	Fr
G	73	Bill Cherpak	So
QB	15	Darnell Dickerson	Fr
QB	11	Sal Genilla	Sr
FB	34	Craig Heyward	Jr
OT	62	Roman Matusz	So
C	61	Ed Miller	Sr
OT	71	Tom Ricketts	Jr
G	77	Mark Stepnoski	Jr
WR	30	Michael Stewart	Sr
WR	2	Reggie Williams	So

Defense

Pos.	#	Name	Class
DE	89	Jon Carter	Sr
LB	44	Jeff Christy	Fr
LB	26	Ezekial Gadson	Sr
DE	92	Burt Grossman	Jr
CB	7	Quintin Jones	Sr
FS	1	Billy Owens	Sr
DT	67	Jim Quinn	So
CB	6	Gary Richard	Sr
DT	98	Tony Siragusa	Jr
DE	93	Marc Spindler	Fr
LB	51	Jerry Wall	Sr
FS	43	Troy Washington	So

Special teams

Pos.	#	Name	Class

Head coach

- Mike Gottfried

Coordinators/assistant coaches

Legend

- (C) Team captain
- (S) Suspended
- (I) Ineligible
- Injured
- Redshirt

== Coaching staff ==
1987 Pittsburgh Panthers football staff
Coaching staff: Mike Gottfried – Head coach; Jack Harbaugh – Assistant head coach; Mike Dickens – Offensive coordinator/quarterbacks; John Fox – Defensive coordinator/secondary; Tommie Liggins – Run coordinator/running backs; Steve Coury – Wide receivers; Frank D'Alonzo – Defensive line; Bill Meyers – Offensive line; Scott O'Brien – Special teams; Sal Sunseri – Linebackers	Support staff: Alex Kramer – Administrative assistant; Bud Ratliff – Recruiting coordinator; Rick Denstorff – Graduate assistant; Bill D'Ottavio – Graduate assistant; John Harbaugh – Graduate assistant; Larry Petroff – Graduate assistant; Donnie Roberts – Graduate assistant	Strength and conditioning staff: Buddy Morris – Weight and strength coordinator; Ray Oliver – Assistant Strength

== Team players drafted into the NFL ==
Player	Position	Round	Pick	NFL club
Craig Heyward	Running back	1	24	New Orleans Saints
Quintin Jones	Defensive back	2	48	Houston Oilers
Jon Carter	Defensive end	5	118	New York Giants
Ezekial Gadson	Defensive back	5	123	Buffalo Bills
Gary Richard	Defensive back	7	173	Green Bay Packers
Billy Owens	Defensive back	10	263	Dallas Cowboys
Ed Miller	Center	11	285	San Diego Chargers
