= 1987 West Virginia Mountaineers football team =

American college football season

1987 West Virginia Mountaineers football

Sun Bowl, L 33–35 vs. Oklahoma State
- Conference: Independent
- Record: 6–6
- Head coach: Don Nehlen (8th season)
- Home stadium: Mountaineer Field

1987 Major eastern college football independents records
	Conf.					Overall
Team	W		L		T	W		L		T
No. 4 Syracuse $	5	–	0	–	0	11	–	0	–	1
Penn State	4	–	2	–	0	8	–	4	–	0
Pittsburgh	3	–	3	–	0	8	–	4	–	0
West Virginia	2	–	3	–	0	6	–	6	–	0
Rutgers	2	–	4	–	0	6	–	5	–	0
Boston College	2	–	4	–	0	5	–	6	–	0
Temple	1	–	3	–	0	3	–	8	–	0
$ – Lambert Trophy Winner; Rankings from AP Poll

1987 NCAA Division I-A independents football records
	Conf.					Overall
Team	W		L		T	W		L		T
No. 1 Miami (FL)		–		–		12	–	0	–	0
No. 4 Syracuse		–		–		11	–	0	–	1
No. 2 Florida State		–		–		11	–	1	–	0
No. 15 South Carolina		–		–		8	–	4	–	0
Pittsburgh		–		–		8	–	4	–	0
Penn State		–		–		8	–	4	–	0
No. 17 Notre Dame		–		–		8	–	4	–	0
Southern Miss		–		–		6	–	5	–	0
Rutgers		–		–		6	–	5	–	0
Southwestern Louisiana		–		–		6	–	5	–	0
Memphis State		–		–		5	–	5	–	1
Northern Illinois		–		–		5	–	5	–	1
West Virginia		–		–		6	–	6	–	0
Tulane		–		–		6	–	6	–	0
Army		–		–		5	–	6	–	0
Boston College		–		–		5	–	6	–	0
East Carolina		–		–		5	–	6	–	0
Akron		–		–		4	–	7	–	0
Cincinnati		–		–		4	–	7	–	0
Louisville		–		–		3	–	7	–	1
Temple		–		–		3	–	8	–	0
Tulsa		–		–		3	–	8	–	0
Virginia Tech		–		–		2	–	9	–	0
Navy		–		–		2	–	9	–	0
Rankings from AP Poll

The 1987 West Virginia Mountaineers football team represented West Virginia University as an independent during the 1987 NCAA Division I-A football season. Led by eighth-year head coach Don Nehlen, the Mountaineers compiled a record of 6–6 with a loss to Oklahoma State in the Sun Bowl. West Virginia played home games at Mountaineer Field in Morgantown, West Virginia.

== Schedule ==
Date	Opponent	Site	Result	Attendance	Source
September 5	Ohio	Mountaineer Field; Morgantown, WV	W 23–3	46,744	
September 12	at No. 5 Ohio State	Ohio Stadium; Columbus, OH	L 3–24	88,272	
September 19	at Maryland	Byrd Stadium; College Park, MD (rivalry)	L 20–25	40,125	
September 26	Pittsburgh	Mountaineer Field; Morgantown, WV (Backyard Brawl)	L 3–6	65,079	
October 3	East Carolina	Mountaineer Field; Morgantown, WV	W 49–0	36,630	
October 17	Cincinnati	Mountaineer Field; Morgantown, WV	W 45–17	46,488	
October 24	at Boston College	Alumni Stadium; Chestnut Hill, MA	W 37–16	31,500	
October 31	at No. 18 Penn State	Beaver Stadium; University Park, PA (rivalry)	L 21–25	85,108	
November 7	Virginia Tech	Mountaineer Field; Morgantown, WV (rivalry)	W 28–16	47,322	
November 14	Rutgers	Mountaineer Field; Morgantown, WV	W 37–13	44,717	
November 21	at No. 6 Syracuse	Carrier Dome; Syracuse, NY (rivalry)	L 31–32	49,866	
December 25	vs. No. 11 Oklahoma State	Sun Bowl; El Paso, TX (Sun Bowl)	L 33–35	43,240	
Rankings from AP Poll released prior to the game

== Roster ==
1987 West Virginia Mountaineers football team roster
Players
Coaches
Offense

Pos.	#	Name	Class
WR	1	Grantis Bell	Jr
WR	7	John Talley	Sr
QB	9	Major Harris	Fr
QB	12	Chuck LeVinus	So
QB	13	Ben Reed	Sr
QB	17	Mike Timko	Sr
FB	20	Craig Taylor	Jr
RB	28	A. B. Brown	Jr
G	75	John Stroia	Jr
WR	88	Reggie Rembert	So

Defense

Pos.	#	Name	Class
DB	3	Alvoid Mays	Jr
DB	14	Jay Darr	Fr
DB	22	Bo Orlando	Jr
DT	61	Mike Fox	So
DE	87	Renaldo Turnbull	So
DT	98	David Grant	Sr

Special teams

Pos.	#	Name	Class
K	8	Charlie Baumann	Jr
P	18	Lance Carion	Jr

Head coach

- Don Nehlen

Coordinators/assistant coaches

Legend

- (C) Team captain
- (S) Suspended
- (I) Ineligible
- Injured
- Redshirt
