= 1987 Navy Midshipmen football team =

American college football season

1987 Navy Midshipmen football
- Conference: Independent
- Record: 2–9
- Head coach: Elliott Uzelac (1st season)
- MVP: Matt Felt
- Captains: Mike Musser; Chuck Smith
- Home stadium: Navy–Marine Corps Memorial Stadium

1987 NCAA Division I-A independents football records
	Conf.					Overall
Team	W		L		T	W		L		T
No. 1 Miami (FL)		–		–		12	–	0	–	0
No. 4 Syracuse		–		–		11	–	0	–	1
No. 2 Florida State		–		–		11	–	1	–	0
No. 15 South Carolina		–		–		8	–	4	–	0
Pittsburgh		–		–		8	–	4	–	0
Penn State		–		–		8	–	4	–	0
No. 17 Notre Dame		–		–		8	–	4	–	0
Southern Miss		–		–		6	–	5	–	0
Rutgers		–		–		6	–	5	–	0
Southwestern Louisiana		–		–		6	–	5	–	0
Memphis State		–		–		5	–	5	–	1
Northern Illinois		–		–		5	–	5	–	1
West Virginia		–		–		6	–	6	–	0
Tulane		–		–		6	–	6	–	0
Army		–		–		5	–	6	–	0
Boston College		–		–		5	–	6	–	0
East Carolina		–		–		5	–	6	–	0
Akron		–		–		4	–	7	–	0
Cincinnati		–		–		4	–	7	–	0
Louisville		–		–		3	–	7	–	1
Temple		–		–		3	–	8	–	0
Tulsa		–		–		3	–	8	–	0
Virginia Tech		–		–		2	–	9	–	0
Navy		–		–		2	–	9	–	0
Rankings from AP Poll

The 1987 Navy Midshipmen football team represented the United States Naval Academy (USNA) as an independent during the 1987 NCAA Division I-A football season. The team was led by first-year head coach Elliott Uzelac.

== Schedule ==
Date	Time	Opponent	Site	TV	Result	Attendance	Source
September 12		William & Mary	Navy–Marine Corps Memorial Stadium; Annapolis, MD		L 12–27		
September 19		Lehigh^{†}	Navy–Marine Corps Memorial Stadium; Annapolis, MD		L 9–24	25,047	
September 26		North Carolina	Navy–Marine Corps Memorial Stadium; Annapolis, MD		L 14–45	23,636	
October 3	1:00 p.m.	at Virginia Tech	Lane Stadium; Blacksburg, VA		L 11–31	35,000	
October 10		Air Force	Navy–Marine Corps Memorial Stadium; Annapolis, MD (Commander-in-Chief's Trophy)		L 13–23	35,622	
October 17		at Penn	Franklin Field; Philadelphia, PA		W 38–28	16,809	
October 24	12:00 p.m.	Pittsburgh	Navy–Marine Corps Memorial Stadium; Annapolis, MD	JPS	L 6–10	29,167	
October 31	12:00 p.m.	at Notre Dame	Notre Dame Stadium; Notre Dame, IN (rivalry)		L 13–56	59,075	
November 7		Syracuse	Navy–Marine Corps Memorial Stadium; Annapolis, MD		L 10–34	26,614	
November 14		at Delaware	Delaware Stadium; Newark, DE		W 31–22	23,100	
December 5	2:00 p.m.	vs. Army	Veterans Stadium; Philadelphia, PA (Army–Navy Game)		L 3–17	68,000	
^{†}Homecoming; All times are in Eastern time

== Game summaries ==
=== Army ===
Army Cadets (4–6) vs. Navy Midshipmen (2–8)

Quarter	1	2	3	4	Total
Navy	0	0	0	3	3
Army	3	0	0	14	17

at Veterans Stadium • Philadelphia, Pennsylvania

- Date: December 5
- Game time: 2:00 p.m. EDT
- Game attendance: 68,000

Game information

Navy

- Alton Grizzard
  3/5, 59 Yds
  17 Rush, 53 Yds
- Don Hughes
  2 Rec, 49 Yds

Army

- Tory Crawford
  2/4, 22 Yds
- Mike Mayweather
  25 Rush, 119 Yds
- Andy Peterson
  1 Rec, 11 Yds
- Ben Barnett
  1 Rec, 11 Yds

Starting offensive lineman Matt Felt and Joe Brennan were held out of the game due to what head coach Elliot Uzelac called "an administrative matter not related to football".

Scoring summary

Quarter	Time	Drive			Team	Scoring information	Score	
Quarter	Time	Plays	Yards	TOP	Team	Scoring information	NAVY	ARMY
1					Army	40-yard field goal by Bit Rambusch	0	3
4					Army	Andy Peterson 1-yard touchdown run, Bit Rambusch kick good	0	10
4	5:01				Navy	30-yard field goal by Ted Fundoukas	3	10
4					Army	Tory Crawford 7-yard touchdown run, Bit Rambusch kick good	3	17
"TOP" = time of possession. For other American football terms, see Glossary of American football.							3	17

== Roster ==
1987 Navy Midshipmen football team roster
Players
Coaches
Offense

Pos.	#	Name	Class
G	69	Bruce Bennett	Sr
RB		James Bradley
G		Joe Brennan
OT		Tim Brunn
C	53	Matt Felt	Sr
QB	16	Alton Grizzard	Fr
RB		Don Holl
WR	91	Don Hughes	Sr
WR		Jon Neumann
RB	38	Chuck Smith (C)	Sr
WR	2	Clay Stackhouse
TE	87	Kevin Voss	Jr
RB		Joe Vitelli

Defense

Pos.	#	Name	Class
DB	4	Jim Chatfield
DB	22	Paul Day	Jr
DL	82	Ron Jones	Jr
DL		David Lowe
DB		Curtis Irby
DB		Bart LaRocca
DB		Mike Milo
DL	64	Mike Musser (C)	Sr
LB		Mark Pimpo
LB		Ray Worthington

Special teams

Pos.	#	Name	Class
K	99	Ted Fundoukas	Jr

Head coach

- Elliot Uzelac

Coordinators/assistant coaches

Legend

- (C) Team captain
- (S) Suspended
- (I) Ineligible
- Injured
- Redshirt
