= Shawn Knight =

American football player (born 1964)

No. 78, 99, 75, 77
- Positions: Defensive tackle, defensive end

Personal information
- Born: June 4, 1964 (age 62); Provo, Utah, U.S.
- Listed height: 6 ft 6 in (1.98 m)
- Listed weight: 290 lb (132 kg)

Career information
- High school: Sparks (NV) Reed
- College: Brigham Young
- NFL draft: 1987: 1st round, 11th overall pick

Career history
- New Orleans Saints (1987); Denver Broncos (1988); Phoenix Cardinals (1989); Minnesota Vikings (1990)*; Kansas City Chiefs (1991)*; Sacramento Surge (1991)
- * Offseason or practice squad member only

Awards and highlights
- PFWA All-Rookie Team (1987); National champion (1984); Third-team All-American (1986)

Career NFL statistics
- Fumble recoveries: 1
- Stats at Pro Football Reference

Shawn Matthew Knight (born June 4, 1964) is an American former professional football player who was a defensive tackle in the National Football League (NFL). He was selected in the first round by the New Orleans Saints, 11th overall in the 1987 NFL draft. He played three seasons in the NFL, playing one season each for the Saints, Denver Broncos and Arizona Cardinals.

In his senior year at Brigham Young University, Knight recorded 16 sacks.

When Knight's pro career began, he reported late to training camp and fell out of favor with the coaching staff. After his rookie season, New Orleans traded Knight to the Denver Broncos in exchange for Ted Gregory. Knight played 31 games in his NFL career, with only one start. The only official statistic that Knight recorded in 31 games was a fumble recovery. He is considered one of the biggest busts in NFL draft history.
