= 1987 Southern Miss Golden Eagles football team =

American college football season

1987 Southern Miss Golden Eagles football
- Conference: Independent
- Record: 6–5
- Head coach: Jim Carmody (6th season)
- Home stadium: M. M. Roberts Stadium

1987 NCAA Division I-A independents football records
	Conf.					Overall
Team	W		L		T	W		L		T
No. 1 Miami (FL)		–		–		12	–	0	–	0
No. 4 Syracuse		–		–		11	–	0	–	1
No. 2 Florida State		–		–		11	–	1	–	0
No. 15 South Carolina		–		–		8	–	4	–	0
Pittsburgh		–		–		8	–	4	–	0
Penn State		–		–		8	–	4	–	0
No. 17 Notre Dame		–		–		8	–	4	–	0
Southern Miss		–		–		6	–	5	–	0
Rutgers		–		–		6	–	5	–	0
Southwestern Louisiana		–		–		6	–	5	–	0
Memphis State		–		–		5	–	5	–	1
Northern Illinois		–		–		5	–	5	–	1
West Virginia		–		–		6	–	6	–	0
Tulane		–		–		6	–	6	–	0
Army		–		–		5	–	6	–	0
Boston College		–		–		5	–	6	–	0
East Carolina		–		–		5	–	6	–	0
Akron		–		–		4	–	7	–	0
Cincinnati		–		–		4	–	7	–	0
Louisville		–		–		3	–	7	–	1
Temple		–		–		3	–	8	–	0
Tulsa		–		–		3	–	8	–	0
Virginia Tech		–		–		2	–	9	–	0
Navy		–		–		2	–	9	–	0
Rankings from AP Poll

The 1987 Southern Miss Golden Eagles football team was an American football team that represented the University of Southern Mississippi as an independent during the 1987 NCAA Division I-A football season. In their sixth year under head coach Jim Carmody, the team compiled a 6–5 record.

== Schedule ==
Date	Opponent	Site	Result	Attendance	Source
September 5	at Alabama	Legion Field; Birmingham, AL	L 6–38	75,808	
September 19	Tulane	M. M. Roberts Stadium; Hattiesburg, MS (rivalry)	W 31–24	16,023	
September 26	No. 16 Texas A&M	Mississippi Veterans Memorial Stadium; Jackson, MS	L 14–27	22,150	
October 3	at Louisville	Cardinal Stadium; Louisville, KY	W 65–6	20,687	
October 10	No. 6 Florida State^{†}	M. M. Roberts Stadium; Hattiesburg, MS	L 10–61	25,853	
October 17	vs. Mississippi State	Mississippi Veterans Memorial Stadium; Jackson, MS	W 18–14	40,000	
October 24	at Memphis State	Liberty Bowl Memorial Stadium; Memphis, TN (rivalry)	W 17–14	27,448	
October 31	Jackson State	M. M. Roberts Stadium; Hattiesburg, MS	W 17–7	33,687	
November 7	Northeast Louisiana	M. M. Roberts Stadium; Hattiesburg, MS	L 24–34	10,123	
November 14	East Carolina	M. M. Roberts Stadium; Hattiesburg, MS	W 38–34	11,023	
November 28	at Southwestern Louisiana	Cajun Field; Lafayette, LA	L 30–37	17,500	
^{†}Homecoming; Rankings from AP Poll released prior to the game

== Roster ==
1987 Southern Miss Golden Eagles football team roster
Players			Coaches
Offense: Pos. / # / Name / Class; QB / 4 / Brett Favre / Fr	Defense: Pos. / # / Name / Class; LB / / Sidney Coleman	Special teams: Pos. / # / Name / Class	Head coach: Jim Carmody; Coordinators/assistant coaches Legend: (C) Team captain; (S) Suspended; (I) Ineligible; Injured; Redshirt
