= 1987 South Carolina Gamecocks football team =

American college football season

1987 South Carolina Gamecocks football

Gator Bowl, L 13–30 vs. LSU
- Conference: Independent

Ranking
- Coaches: No. 15
- AP: No. 15
- Record: 8–4
- Head coach: Joe Morrison (5th season)
- Offensive scheme: Run N' Shoot
- Defensive coordinator: Joe Lee Dunn (1st season)
- Home stadium: Williams–Brice Stadium

1987 NCAA Division I-A independents football records
	Conf.					Overall
Team	W		L		T	W		L		T
No. 1 Miami (FL)		–		–		12	–	0	–	0
No. 4 Syracuse		–		–		11	–	0	–	1
No. 2 Florida State		–		–		11	–	1	–	0
No. 15 South Carolina		–		–		8	–	4	–	0
Pittsburgh		–		–		8	–	4	–	0
Penn State		–		–		8	–	4	–	0
No. 17 Notre Dame		–		–		8	–	4	–	0
Southern Miss		–		–		6	–	5	–	0
Rutgers		–		–		6	–	5	–	0
Southwestern Louisiana		–		–		6	–	5	–	0
Memphis State		–		–		5	–	5	–	1
Northern Illinois		–		–		5	–	5	–	1
West Virginia		–		–		6	–	6	–	0
Tulane		–		–		6	–	6	–	0
Army		–		–		5	–	6	–	0
Boston College		–		–		5	–	6	–	0
East Carolina		–		–		5	–	6	–	0
Akron		–		–		4	–	7	–	0
Cincinnati		–		–		4	–	7	–	0
Louisville		–		–		3	–	7	–	1
Temple		–		–		3	–	8	–	0
Tulsa		–		–		3	–	8	–	0
Virginia Tech		–		–		2	–	9	–	0
Navy		–		–		2	–	9	–	0
Rankings from AP Poll

The 1987 South Carolina Gamecocks football team represented the University of South Carolina as an independent during the 1987 NCAA Division I-A football season. The team played its home games at Williams–Brice Stadium. Led by fifth-year head coach Joe Morrison, the Gamecocks compiled a record of 8–4 with a loss against LSU in the Gator Bowl.

After two consecutive losing seasons, the Gamecocks returned to success under Morrison in 1987. Led by quarterback Todd Ellis, wide receiver Sterling Sharpe, and the "Black Death" defense, the 1987 Gamecocks were considered "maybe the best South Carolina team ever" until then. Their four losses were all on the road against teams that would finish in the top-15 in the AP Poll, including eventual national champion Miami. The Gamecocks were ranked as high as No. 8 in the country in their final two games. South Carolina finished the season ranked No. 15 in the AP Poll, which was the third final ranking in school history and the second-highest final ranking in school history until then.

The "Black Death" defense was statistically the best in school history. They gave up an average 11.8 points and less than 240 yards per game. They held seven teams to less than eleven points, and held nine teams to less than fourteen points.

== Schedule ==
Date	Opponent	Rank	Site	TV	Result	Attendance	Source
September 5	Appalachian State		Williams–Brice Stadium; Columbia, SC		W 24–3	68,830	
September 12	Western Carolina		Williams–Brice Stadium; Columbia, SC		W 31–6	66,573	
September 26	at No. 20 Georgia		Sanford Stadium; Athens, GA (rivalry)		L 6–13	82,122	
October 3	at No. 2 Nebraska		Memorial Stadium; Lincoln, NE	ESPN	L 21–30	76,061	
October 10	Virginia Tech		Williams–Brice Stadium; Columbia, SC		W 40–10	73,150	
October 17	Virginia		Williams–Brice Stadium; Columbia, SC		W 58–10	67,638	
October 24	East Carolina		Williams–Brice Stadium; Columbia, SC		W 34–12	69,131	
October 31	NC State	No. 19	Williams–Brice Stadium; Columbia, SC		W 48–0	74,200	
November 14	at Wake Forest	No. 14	Groves Stadium; Winston-Salem, NC		W 30–0	34,720	
November 21	No. 8 Clemson	No. 12	Williams–Brice Stadium; Columbia, SC (rivalry)	ESPN	W 20–7	75,043	
December 5	at No. 2 Miami (FL)	No. 8	Miami Orange Bowl; Miami, FL	ESPN	L 16–20	63,318	
December 31	vs. No. 7 LSU	No. 8	Gator Bowl Stadium; Jacksonville, FL (Gator Bowl)	CBS	L 13–30	82,119	
Rankings from AP Poll released prior to the game

== Roster ==
1987 South Carolina Gamecocks football team roster
Players
Coaches
Offense

Pos.	#	Name	Class
QB	9	Todd Ellis	Jr
OT	78	Mark Fryer	Jr
C	57	Woody Meyers	Sr
WR	2	Sterling Sharpe	Sr
G	71	Paul Shivers	Jr

Defense

Pos.	#	Name	Class
DB	27	Brad Edwards	Sr
DT	54	Roy Hart
DT	95	Brendan McCormack	Sr
LB	48	Matt McKernan	Jr
DE	92	Kurt Wilson

Special teams

Pos.	#	Name	Class
K	8	Collin Mackie

Head coach

- Joe Morrison

Coordinators/assistant coaches

- Joe Lee Dunn (Defensive coordinator)

Legend

- (C) Team captain
- (S) Suspended
- (I) Ineligible
- Injured
- Redshirt
