= 1987 Akron Zips football team =

American college football season

1987 Akron Zips football
- Conference: Independent
- Record: 4–7
- Head coach: Gerry Faust (2nd season)
- Home stadium: Rubber Bowl

1987 NCAA Division I-A independents football records
	Conf.					Overall
Team	W		L		T	W		L		T
No. 1 Miami (FL)		–		–		12	–	0	–	0
No. 4 Syracuse		–		–		11	–	0	–	1
No. 2 Florida State		–		–		11	–	1	–	0
No. 15 South Carolina		–		–		8	–	4	–	0
Pittsburgh		–		–		8	–	4	–	0
Penn State		–		–		8	–	4	–	0
No. 17 Notre Dame		–		–		8	–	4	–	0
Southern Miss		–		–		6	–	5	–	0
Rutgers		–		–		6	–	5	–	0
Southwestern Louisiana		–		–		6	–	5	–	0
Memphis State		–		–		5	–	5	–	1
Northern Illinois		–		–		5	–	5	–	1
West Virginia		–		–		6	–	6	–	0
Tulane		–		–		6	–	6	–	0
Army		–		–		5	–	6	–	0
Boston College		–		–		5	–	6	–	0
East Carolina		–		–		5	–	6	–	0
Akron		–		–		4	–	7	–	0
Cincinnati		–		–		4	–	7	–	0
Louisville		–		–		3	–	7	–	1
Temple		–		–		3	–	8	–	0
Tulsa		–		–		3	–	8	–	0
Virginia Tech		–		–		2	–	9	–	0
Navy		–		–		2	–	9	–	0
Rankings from AP Poll

The 1987 Akron Zips football team represented Akron University in the 1987 NCAA Division I-A football season as Division I-A independents. They were led by second-year head coach Gerry Faust. The Zips played their home games at the Rubber Bowl in Akron, Ohio. They finished the season with a record of 4–7.

== Schedule ==
Date	Opponent	Site	Result	Attendance	Source
September 5	at Western Michigan	Waldo Stadium; Kalamazoo, MI	L 19–24	15,378	
September 12	Kent State	Rubber Bowl; Akron, OH (Wagon Wheel)	L 23–27	35,187	
September 19	Eastern Michigan	Rubber Bowl; Akron, OH	W 17–16	10,032	
September 24	at Temple	Veterans Stadium; Philadelphia, PA	L 3–23	17,852	
October 3	No. 14 (I-AA) Eastern Illinois	Rubber Bowl; Akron, OH	W 24–10	12,524	
October 10	at Oregon State	Reser Stadium; Corvallis, OR	L 26–42	23,516	
October 17	No. 16 (I-AA) Delaware State	Rubber Bowl; Akron, OH	L 26–52	9,491	
October 24	at Louisville	Cardinal Stadium; Louisville, KY	L 10–31	18,743	
October 31	Nicholls State	Rubber Bowl; Akron, OH	W 23–17	4,217	
November 14	at Northern Illinois	Huskie Stadium; DeKalb, IL	W 27–21	5,405	
November 20	No. 19 (I-AA) Youngstown State	Rubber Bowl; Akron, OH (Steel Tire)	L 6–10	1,300	
Rankings from AP Poll released prior to the game
