= 1987 Rutgers Scarlet Knights football team =

American college football season

1987 Rutgers Scarlet Knights football
- Conference: Independent
- Record: 6–5
- Head coach: Dick Anderson (4th season)
- Offensive coordinator: Dick Curl (5th season)
- Defensive coordinator: Otto Kneidinger (4th season)
- Home stadium: Rutgers Stadium; Giants Stadium

1987 Major eastern college football independents records
	Conf.					Overall
Team	W		L		T	W		L		T
No. 4 Syracuse $	5	–	0	–	0	11	–	0	–	1
Penn State	4	–	2	–	0	8	–	4	–	0
Pittsburgh	3	–	3	–	0	8	–	4	–	0
West Virginia	2	–	3	–	0	6	–	6	–	0
Rutgers	2	–	4	–	0	6	–	5	–	0
Boston College	2	–	4	–	0	5	–	6	–	0
Temple	1	–	3	–	0	3	–	8	–	0
$ – Lambert Trophy Winner; Rankings from AP Poll

1987 NCAA Division I-A independents football records
	Conf.					Overall
Team	W		L		T	W		L		T
No. 1 Miami (FL)		–		–		12	–	0	–	0
No. 4 Syracuse		–		–		11	–	0	–	1
No. 2 Florida State		–		–		11	–	1	–	0
No. 15 South Carolina		–		–		8	–	4	–	0
Pittsburgh		–		–		8	–	4	–	0
Penn State		–		–		8	–	4	–	0
No. 17 Notre Dame		–		–		8	–	4	–	0
Southern Miss		–		–		6	–	5	–	0
Rutgers		–		–		6	–	5	–	0
Southwestern Louisiana		–		–		6	–	5	–	0
Memphis State		–		–		5	–	5	–	1
Northern Illinois		–		–		5	–	5	–	1
West Virginia		–		–		6	–	6	–	0
Tulane		–		–		6	–	6	–	0
Army		–		–		5	–	6	–	0
Boston College		–		–		5	–	6	–	0
East Carolina		–		–		5	–	6	–	0
Akron		–		–		4	–	7	–	0
Cincinnati		–		–		4	–	7	–	0
Louisville		–		–		3	–	7	–	1
Temple		–		–		3	–	8	–	0
Tulsa		–		–		3	–	8	–	0
Virginia Tech		–		–		2	–	9	–	0
Navy		–		–		2	–	9	–	0
Rankings from AP Poll

The 1987 Rutgers Scarlet Knights football team represented Rutgers University as an independent during the 1987 NCAA Division I-A football season. In their fourth season under head coach Dick Anderson, the Scarlet Knights compiled a 6–5 record while competing as an independent and were outscored by their opponents 213 to 168. The team's statistical leaders included Scott Erney with 1,369 passing yards, Henry Henderson with 846 rushing yards, and Eric Young with 364 receiving yards.

== Schedule ==
Date	Opponent	Site	Result	Attendance	Source
September 5	at Cincinnati	Nippert Stadium; Cincinnati, OH	W 10–7	21,803	
September 12	Syracuse	Rutgers Stadium; Piscataway, NJ	L 3–20	23,726	
September 26	Kentucky	Giants Stadium; East Rutherford, NJ	W 19–18	21,232	
October 3	Duke	Rutgers Stadium; Piscataway, NJ	W 7–0	13,247	
October 10	at No. 14 Penn State	Beaver Stadium; University Park, PA	L 21–35	85,376	
October 17	Boston College	Rutgers Stadium; Piscataway, NJ	W 38–24	30,253	
October 24	at Army	Michie Stadium; West Point, NY	W 27–14	40,711	
October 31	at Vanderbilt	Vanderbilt Stadium; Nashville, TN	L 13–27	35,347	
November 7	Pittsburgh	Giants Stadium; East Rutherford, NJ	L 0–17	25,444	
November 14	at West Virginia	Mountaineer Field; Morgantown, WV	L 13–37	44,717	
November 21	at Temple	Veterans Stadium; Philadelphia, PA	W 17–14		
Rankings from AP Poll released prior to the game

== Roster ==
1987 Rutgers Scarlet Knights football team roster
Players
Coaches
Offense

Pos.	#	Name	Class
TE	89	Bruce Campbell	Sr
WR	20	Brian Cobb	Sr
G	56	Dan Cykewick	So
TE	82	James Jenkins	So
QB	11	Matt Johnson	So
WR	80	Doug Johnson	So

Defense

Pos.	#	Name	Class
DB	26	Jean Austin	Sr
DB	9	Eric Deering	So
DE	46	Tom Duffy	Sr
LB	45	Chris Evans	Jr
LB		Russ Nelson	Sr

Special teams

Pos.	#	Name	Class
P	9	Matt O'Connell	Jr

Head coach

- Dick Anderson

Coordinators/assistant coaches

Legend

- (C) Team captain
- (S) Suspended
- (I) Ineligible
- Injured
- Redshirt
