= 1987 Temple Owls football team =

American college football season

1987 Temple Owls football
- Conference: Independent
- Record: 3–8
- Head coach: Bruce Arians (5th season)
- Defensive coordinator: Nick Rapone (3rd season)
- Home stadium: Veterans Stadium

1987 Major eastern college football independents records
	Conf.					Overall
Team	W		L		T	W		L		T
No. 4 Syracuse $	5	–	0	–	0	11	–	0	–	1
Penn State	4	–	2	–	0	8	–	4	–	0
Pittsburgh	3	–	3	–	0	8	–	4	–	0
West Virginia	2	–	3	–	0	6	–	6	–	0
Rutgers	2	–	4	–	0	6	–	5	–	0
Boston College	2	–	4	–	0	5	–	6	–	0
Temple	1	–	3	–	0	3	–	8	–	0
$ – Lambert Trophy Winner; Rankings from AP Poll

1987 NCAA Division I-A independents football records
	Conf.					Overall
Team	W		L		T	W		L		T
No. 1 Miami (FL)		–		–		12	–	0	–	0
No. 4 Syracuse		–		–		11	–	0	–	1
No. 2 Florida State		–		–		11	–	1	–	0
No. 15 South Carolina		–		–		8	–	4	–	0
Pittsburgh		–		–		8	–	4	–	0
Penn State		–		–		8	–	4	–	0
No. 17 Notre Dame		–		–		8	–	4	–	0
Southern Miss		–		–		6	–	5	–	0
Rutgers		–		–		6	–	5	–	0
Southwestern Louisiana		–		–		6	–	5	–	0
Memphis State		–		–		5	–	5	–	1
Northern Illinois		–		–		5	–	5	–	1
West Virginia		–		–		6	–	6	–	0
Tulane		–		–		6	–	6	–	0
Army		–		–		5	–	6	–	0
Boston College		–		–		5	–	6	–	0
East Carolina		–		–		5	–	6	–	0
Akron		–		–		4	–	7	–	0
Cincinnati		–		–		4	–	7	–	0
Louisville		–		–		3	–	7	–	1
Temple		–		–		3	–	8	–	0
Tulsa		–		–		3	–	8	–	0
Virginia Tech		–		–		2	–	9	–	0
Navy		–		–		2	–	9	–	0
Rankings from AP Poll

The 1987 Temple Owls football team was an American football team that represented Temple University as an independent during the 1987 NCAA Division I-A football season. In its fifth season under head coach Bruce Arians, the team compiled a 3–8 record and was outscored by a total of 251 to 154. The team played its home games at Veterans Stadium in Philadelphia.

The team's statistical leaders included James Thompson with 985 passing yards, Todd McNair with 1,058 rushing yards, Keith Gloster with 411 receiving yards, and placekicker Bill Wright with 60 points scored.

== Schedule ==
Date	Opponent	Site	Result	Attendance	Source
September 5	at Toledo	Glass Bowl; Toledo, OH	W 13–12	18,191	
September 12	at Boston College	Alumni Stadium; Chestnut Hill, MA	L 7–28	27,500	
September 19	at No. 16 Pittsburgh	Pitt Stadium; Pittsburgh, PA	W 24–21	45,387	
September 24	Akron	Veterans Stadium; Philadelphia, PA	W 23–3		
October 3	at No. 14 Penn State	Beaver Stadium; University Park, PA	L 13–27	84,000	
October 10	Tulsa	Veterans Stadium; Philadelphia, PA	L 17–24	20,008	
October 17	at No. 14 Florida	Florida Field; Gainesville, FL	L 3–34	74,286	
October 31	at Army	Michie Stadium; West Point, NY	L 7–17	32,053	
November 7	at East Carolina	Ficklen Memorial Stadium; Greenville, NC	L 26–31	19,327	
November 14	Houston	Veterans Stadium; Philadelphia, PA	L 7–37	12,780	
November 21	Rutgers	Veterans Stadium; Philadelphia, PA	L 14–17		
Rankings from AP Poll released prior to the game
