= 1987 Louisville Cardinals football team =

American college football season

1987 Louisville Cardinals football
- Conference: Independent
- Record: 3–7–1
- Head coach: Howard Schnellenberger (3rd season)
- Defensive coordinator: Rick Lantz (2nd season)
- Home stadium: Cardinal Stadium

1987 NCAA Division I-A independents football records
| | Conf. | | | | | Overall |
| Team | W | | L | | T | W | | L | | T |
|---|---|---|---|---|---|---|---|---|---|---|
| No. 1 Miami (FL) | | – | | – | | 12 | – | 0 | – | 0 |
| No. 4 Syracuse | | – | | – | | 11 | – | 0 | – | 1 |
| No. 2 Florida State | | – | | – | | 11 | – | 1 | – | 0 |
| No. 15 South Carolina | | – | | – | | 8 | – | 4 | – | 0 |
| Pittsburgh | | – | | – | | 8 | – | 4 | – | 0 |
| Penn State | | – | | – | | 8 | – | 4 | – | 0 |
| No. 17 Notre Dame | | – | | – | | 8 | – | 4 | – | 0 |
| Southern Miss | | – | | – | | 6 | – | 5 | – | 0 |
| Rutgers | | – | | – | | 6 | – | 5 | – | 0 |
| Southwestern Louisiana | | – | | – | | 6 | – | 5 | – | 0 |
| Memphis State | | – | | – | | 5 | – | 5 | – | 1 |
| Northern Illinois | | – | | – | | 5 | – | 5 | – | 1 |
| West Virginia | | – | | – | | 6 | – | 6 | – | 0 |
| Tulane | | – | | – | | 6 | – | 6 | – | 0 |
| Army | | – | | – | | 5 | – | 6 | – | 0 |
| Boston College | | – | | – | | 5 | – | 6 | – | 0 |
| East Carolina | | – | | – | | 5 | – | 6 | – | 0 |
| Akron | | – | | – | | 4 | – | 7 | – | 0 |
| Cincinnati | | – | | – | | 4 | – | 7 | – | 0 |
| Louisville | | – | | – | | 3 | – | 7 | – | 1 |
| Temple | | – | | – | | 3 | – | 8 | – | 0 |
| Tulsa | | – | | – | | 3 | – | 8 | – | 0 |
| Virginia Tech | | – | | – | | 2 | – | 9 | – | 0 |
| Navy | | – | | – | | 2 | – | 9 | – | 0 |
Rankings from AP Poll

The 1987 Louisville Cardinals football team represented the University of Louisville in the 1987 NCAA Division I-A football season. The Cardinals, led by third-year head coach Howard Schnellenberger, participated as independents and played their home games at Cardinal Stadium.

== Schedule ==
| Date | Opponent | Site | Result | Attendance | Source |
|---|---|---|---|---|---|
| September 5 | Tulane | Cardinal Stadium; Louisville, KY | W 42–40 | 32,242 | |
| September 12 | Cincinnati | Cardinal Stadium; Louisville, KY (The Keg of Nails) | L 0–25 | 33,392 | |
| September 19 | at Purdue | Ross–Ade Stadium; West Lafayette, IN | T 22–22 | 63,125 | |
| September 26 | Murray State | Cardinal Stadium; Louisville, KY | W 34–10 | 29,231 | |
| October 3 | Southern Miss | Cardinal Stadium; Louisville, KY | L 6–65 | 20,647 | |
| October 10 | Marshall | Cardinal Stadium; Louisville, KY | L 31–34 | 21,658 | |
| October 17 | at No. 4 Florida State | Doak Campbell Stadium; Tallahassee, FL | L 9–32 | 53,114 | |
| October 24 | Akron^{†} | Cardinal Stadium; Louisville, KY | W 31–10 | 18,743 | |
| October 31 | at Tulsa | Skelly Stadium; Tulsa, OK | L 22–26 | 19,742 | |
| November 7 | at No. 19 Tennessee | Neyland Stadium; Knoxville, TN | L 10–41 | 92,084 | |
| November 14 | at Memphis State | Liberty Bowl Memorial Stadium; Memphis, TN (rivalry) | L 8–43 | 20,418 | |
^{†}Homecoming; Rankings from AP Poll released prior to the game
