= 1987 Cincinnati Bearcats football team =

American college football season

1987 Cincinnati Bearcats football
- Conference: Independent
- Record: 4–7
- Head coach: Dave Currey (4th season)
- Defensive coordinator: Dave Ritchie (1st season)
- Home stadium: Nippert Stadium

1987 NCAA Division I-A independents football records
	Conf.					Overall
Team	W		L		T	W		L		T
No. 1 Miami (FL)		–		–		12	–	0	–	0
No. 4 Syracuse		–		–		11	–	0	–	1
No. 2 Florida State		–		–		11	–	1	–	0
No. 15 South Carolina		–		–		8	–	4	–	0
Pittsburgh		–		–		8	–	4	–	0
Penn State		–		–		8	–	4	–	0
No. 17 Notre Dame		–		–		8	–	4	–	0
Southern Miss		–		–		6	–	5	–	0
Rutgers		–		–		6	–	5	–	0
Southwestern Louisiana		–		–		6	–	5	–	0
Memphis State		–		–		5	–	5	–	1
Northern Illinois		–		–		5	–	5	–	1
West Virginia		–		–		6	–	6	–	0
Tulane		–		–		6	–	6	–	0
Army		–		–		5	–	6	–	0
Boston College		–		–		5	–	6	–	0
East Carolina		–		–		5	–	6	–	0
Akron		–		–		4	–	7	–	0
Cincinnati		–		–		4	–	7	–	0
Louisville		–		–		3	–	7	–	1
Temple		–		–		3	–	8	–	0
Tulsa		–		–		3	–	8	–	0
Virginia Tech		–		–		2	–	9	–	0
Navy		–		–		2	–	9	–	0
Rankings from AP Poll

The 1987 Cincinnati Bearcats football team represented the University of Cincinnati during the 1987 NCAA Division I-A football season. The Bearcats, led by head coach Dave Currey, participated as independent and played their home games at Nippert Stadium.

== Schedule ==
Date	Opponent	Site	Result	Attendance	Source
September 5	Rutgers	Nippert Stadium; Cincinnati, OH	L 7–10	21,803	
September 12	at Louisville	Cardinal Stadium; Louisville, KY (The Keg of Nails)	W 25–0	33,392	
September 19	at No. 20 Penn State	Beaver Stadium; University Park, PA	L 0–41	82,000	
September 26	Miami (OH)	Nippert Stadium; Cincinnati, OH (Victory Bell)	W 31–26	27,291	
October 10	at East Carolina	Ficklen Memorial Stadium; Greenville, NC	L 28–56	26,371	
October 17	at West Virginia	Mountaineer Field; Morgantown, WV	L 17–45	46,488	
October 24	No. 3 Miami (FL)	Riverfront Stadium; Cincinnati, OH	L 10–48	20,011	
October 31	Tennessee Tech^{†}	Nippert Stadium; Cincinnati, OH	W 38–17		
November 7	vs. Indiana State	Hoosier Dome; Indianapolis, IN	L 16–40	5,424	
November 14	Austin Peay	Nippert Stadium; Cincinnati, OH	W 42–10	10,164	
November 21	at Virginia Tech	Lane Stadium; Blacksburg, VA	L 20–21	10,600	
^{†}Homecoming; Rankings from AP Poll released prior to the game
