= 1987 Boston College Eagles football team =

American college football season

1987 Boston College Eagles football
- Conference: Independent
- Record: 5–6
- Head coach: Jack Bicknell (7th season)
- Defensive coordinator: Seymour "Red" Kelin (7th season)
- Captains: Peter Casparriello; Dave Nugent; Jim Turner
- Home stadium: Alumni Stadium; Sullivan Stadium

1987 Major eastern college football independents records
	Conf.					Overall
Team	W		L		T	W		L		T
No. 4 Syracuse $	5	–	0	–	0	11	–	0	–	1
Penn State	4	–	2	–	0	8	–	4	–	0
Pittsburgh	3	–	3	–	0	8	–	4	–	0
West Virginia	2	–	3	–	0	6	–	6	–	0
Rutgers	2	–	4	–	0	6	–	5	–	0
Boston College	2	–	4	–	0	5	–	6	–	0
Temple	1	–	3	–	0	3	–	8	–	0
$ – Lambert Trophy Winner; Rankings from AP Poll

1987 NCAA Division I-A independents football records
	Conf.					Overall
Team	W		L		T	W		L		T
No. 1 Miami (FL)		–		–		12	–	0	–	0
No. 4 Syracuse		–		–		11	–	0	–	1
No. 2 Florida State		–		–		11	–	1	–	0
No. 15 South Carolina		–		–		8	–	4	–	0
Pittsburgh		–		–		8	–	4	–	0
Penn State		–		–		8	–	4	–	0
No. 17 Notre Dame		–		–		8	–	4	–	0
Southern Miss		–		–		6	–	5	–	0
Rutgers		–		–		6	–	5	–	0
Southwestern Louisiana		–		–		6	–	5	–	0
Memphis State		–		–		5	–	5	–	1
Northern Illinois		–		–		5	–	5	–	1
West Virginia		–		–		6	–	6	–	0
Tulane		–		–		6	–	6	–	0
Army		–		–		5	–	6	–	0
Boston College		–		–		5	–	6	–	0
East Carolina		–		–		5	–	6	–	0
Akron		–		–		4	–	7	–	0
Cincinnati		–		–		4	–	7	–	0
Louisville		–		–		3	–	7	–	1
Temple		–		–		3	–	8	–	0
Tulsa		–		–		3	–	8	–	0
Virginia Tech		–		–		2	–	9	–	0
Navy		–		–		2	–	9	–	0
Rankings from AP Poll

The 1987 Boston College Eagles football team represented Boston College as an independent during the 1987 NCAA Division I-A football season. The Eagles were led by seventh-year head coach Jack Bicknell, and played their home games at Alumni Stadium in Chestnut Hill, Massachusetts. They also played an alternate-site home game at Sullivan Stadium (later known as Foxboro Stadium) in Foxborough, Massachusetts.

== Schedule ==
Date	Opponent	Rank	Site	TV	Result	Attendance	Source
September 5	TCU		Alumni Stadium; Chestnut Hill, MA		W 38–20	30,000	
September 12	Temple		Alumni Stadium; Chestnut Hill, MA		W 28–7	27,500	
September 19	at USC	No. 19	Los Angeles Memorial Coliseum; Los Angeles, CA		L 17–23	46,205	
September 26	No. 15 Penn State		Sullivan Stadium; Foxborough, MA		L 17–27	50,267	
October 3	at Pittsburgh		Pitt Stadium; Pittsburgh, PA		W 13–10	46,238	
October 10	Army		Alumni Stadium; Chestnut Hill, MA		W 29–24	31,500	
October 17	at Rutgers		Rutgers Stadium; Piscataway, NJ		L 24–38	30,253	
October 24	West Virginia		Alumni Stadium; Chestnut Hill, MA		L 16–37	31,500	
October 31	No. 13 Tennessee		Alumni Stadium; Chestnut Hill, MA	JPT	W 20–18	31,800	
November 7	at No. 9 Notre Dame		Notre Dame Stadium; Notre Dame, IN (Holy War)		L 25–32	59,075	
November 14	at No. 6 Syracuse		Carrier Dome; Syracuse, NY		L 17–45	49,892	
Rankings from AP Poll released prior to the game

== Roster ==
1987 Boston College Eagles football team roster
Players
Coaches
Offense

Pos.	#	Name	Class
WR	24	Darren Flutie	Jr
WR	16	Tom Waddle	Jr
OT	69	Dave Widell	Sr
G	74	Doug Widell	Jr
OL	64	Joe Wolf	Jr

Defense

Pos.	#	Name	Class
LB	55	John Galvin	Sr
LB	53	Bill Romanowski	Sr

Special teams

Pos.	#	Name	Class

Head coach

- Jack Bicknell

Coordinators/assistant coaches

Legend

- (C) Team captain
- (S) Suspended
- (I) Ineligible
- Injured
- Redshirt
