= 1987 Memphis State Tigers football team =

American college football season

1987 Memphis State Tigers football
- Conference: Independent
- Record: 5–5–1
- Head coach: Charlie Bailey (2nd season)
- Offensive coordinator: Buddy Geis (2nd season)
- Defensive coordinator: Pete Kuharchek (1st season)
- Home stadium: Liberty Bowl Memorial Stadium

1987 NCAA Division I-A independents football records
	Conf.					Overall
Team	W		L		T	W		L		T
No. 1 Miami (FL)		–		–		12	–	0	–	0
No. 4 Syracuse		–		–		11	–	0	–	1
No. 2 Florida State		–		–		11	–	1	–	0
No. 15 South Carolina		–		–		8	–	4	–	0
Pittsburgh		–		–		8	–	4	–	0
Penn State		–		–		8	–	4	–	0
No. 17 Notre Dame		–		–		8	–	4	–	0
Southern Miss		–		–		6	–	5	–	0
Rutgers		–		–		6	–	5	–	0
Southwestern Louisiana		–		–		6	–	5	–	0
Memphis State		–		–		5	–	5	–	1
Northern Illinois		–		–		5	–	5	–	1
West Virginia		–		–		6	–	6	–	0
Tulane		–		–		6	–	6	–	0
Army		–		–		5	–	6	–	0
Boston College		–		–		5	–	6	–	0
East Carolina		–		–		5	–	6	–	0
Akron		–		–		4	–	7	–	0
Cincinnati		–		–		4	–	7	–	0
Louisville		–		–		3	–	7	–	1
Temple		–		–		3	–	8	–	0
Tulsa		–		–		3	–	8	–	0
Virginia Tech		–		–		2	–	9	–	0
Navy		–		–		2	–	9	–	0
Rankings from AP Poll

The 1987 Memphis State Tigers football team represented Memphis State University (now known as the University of Memphis) as an independent in the 1987 NCAA Division I-A football season. The team was led by fifth-year head coach Charlie Bailey and played their home games at the Liberty Bowl Memorial Stadium in Memphis, Tennessee.

== Schedule ==
Date	Opponent	Site	Result	Attendance	Source
September 5	Ole Miss	Liberty Bowl Memorial Stadium; Memphis, TN (rivalry)	W 16–10	64,186	
September 12	at Vanderbilt	Vanderbilt Stadium; Nashville, TN	L 17–27	40,694	
September 19	at No. 7 Florida State	Doak Campbell Stadium; Tallahassee, FL	L 24–41	50,191	
October 3	at Mississippi State	Scott Field; Starkville, MS	L 6–9	37,264	
October 10	No. 15 Alabama	Liberty Bowl Memorial Stadium; Memphis, TN	W 13-10	40,622	
October 17	Tulane^{†}	Liberty Bowl Memorial Stadium; Memphis, TN	W 45–36	32,751	
October 24	Southern Miss	Liberty Bowl Memorial Stadium; Memphis, TN (Black and Blue Bowl)	L 14–17	27,448	
October 31	Arkansas State	Liberty Bowl Memorial Stadium; Memphis, TN (Paint Bucket Bowl)	T 21–21	21,421	
November 7	at Southwestern Louisiana	Cajun Field; Lafayette, LA	L 7–31	20,052	
November 14	Louisville	Liberty Bowl Memorial Stadium; Memphis, TN (rivalry)	W 43-8	20,418	
November 21	at Tulsa	Skelly Stadium; Tulsa, OK	W 14–0	18,612	
^{†}Homecoming; Rankings from AP Poll released prior to the game
