= 1987 Virginia Tech Hokies football team =

American college football season

1987 Virginia Tech Hokies football
- Conference: Independent
- Record: 2–9
- Head coach: Frank Beamer (1st season)
- Offensive scheme: Multiple
- Defensive coordinator: Ron Zook (1st season)
- Base defense: 4–3
- Home stadium: Lane Stadium

1987 NCAA Division I-A independents football records
	Conf.					Overall
Team	W		L		T	W		L		T
No. 1 Miami (FL)		–		–		12	–	0	–	0
No. 4 Syracuse		–		–		11	–	0	–	1
No. 2 Florida State		–		–		11	–	1	–	0
No. 15 South Carolina		–		–		8	–	4	–	0
Pittsburgh		–		–		8	–	4	–	0
Penn State		–		–		8	–	4	–	0
No. 17 Notre Dame		–		–		8	–	4	–	0
Southern Miss		–		–		6	–	5	–	0
Rutgers		–		–		6	–	5	–	0
Southwestern Louisiana		–		–		6	–	5	–	0
Memphis State		–		–		5	–	5	–	1
Northern Illinois		–		–		5	–	5	–	1
West Virginia		–		–		6	–	6	–	0
Tulane		–		–		6	–	6	–	0
Army		–		–		5	–	6	–	0
Boston College		–		–		5	–	6	–	0
East Carolina		–		–		5	–	6	–	0
Akron		–		–		4	–	7	–	0
Cincinnati		–		–		4	–	7	–	0
Louisville		–		–		3	–	7	–	1
Temple		–		–		3	–	8	–	0
Tulsa		–		–		3	–	8	–	0
Virginia Tech		–		–		2	–	9	–	0
Navy		–		–		2	–	9	–	0
Rankings from AP Poll

The 1987 Virginia Tech Hokies football team represented Virginia Polytechnic Institute and State University as an independent during the 1987 NCAA Division I-A football season. In their first season under head coach Frank Beamer, the Hokies compiled a 2–9 record, scored 203 points, and allowed 300. Virginia Tech played its home games at Lane Stadium in Blacksburg, Virginia.

Virginia Tech lost its first three games to No. 10 Clemson, Virginia, and Syracuse. The Hokies defeated Navy, 31–11, on October 3 for Beamer's first victory at Virginia Tech, then lost six consecutive games before closing the season with a 21–20 win over Cincinnati.

Freshman running back Jon Jeffries led the team with 599 rushing yards and three touchdowns on 125 carries. He also returned 22 kickoffs for 561 yards, including a 92-yard touchdown against Clemson. Quarterback Erik Chapman completed 119 of 231 passes for 1,340 yards, 10 touchdowns, and 14 interceptions. Tight end Steve Johnson had a team-high 38 receptions for 475 yards and three touchdowns, while Myron Richardson caught 28 passes for 396 yards and four touchdowns. Placekicker Chris Kinzer led the team with 47 points, making 8 of 17 field-goal attempts and all 23 of his extra-point attempts.

Defensive tackle Scott Hill led Virginia Tech with 177 tackles, six sacks, and seven tackles for loss. Inside linebacker Randy Cockrell recorded 133 tackles and returned an interception 90 yards for a touchdown against Navy. Defensive back Carter Wiley had 126 tackles, and Greg Drew had 110 tackles, five tackles for loss, and one sack. Virginia Tech recorded 14 sacks and recovered 16 of its opponents' 32 fumbles during the season.

== The Beamer era begins ==
Virginia Tech hired Frank Beamer before the 1987 season to replace Bill Dooley. Beamer had coached Murray State for six seasons from 1981 through 1986, compiling a 42–23–2 record and sharing the 1986 Ohio Valley Conference championship. Dooley had gone 64–37–1 in nine seasons at Virginia Tech (including a forfeit to Temple). Beamer's first Virginia Tech staff included defensive coordinator Ron Zook.

Although the Hokies finished 2–9, all but two of their losses were by two touchdowns or less. Notably, Tech lost 14–13 at Virginia after a two-point conversion attempt failed with 1:24 remaining, and lost 14–7 at Kentucky after holding the Wildcats scoreless over the final three quarters. The Hokies were also tied 13–13 with third-ranked Miami entering the fourth quarter before losing 27–13.

== Schedule ==
Date	Time	Opponent	Site	Result	Attendance	Source
September 12	1:00 p.m.	No. 10 Clemson	Lane Stadium; Blacksburg, VA	L 10-22	42,000	
September 19	1:00 p.m.	at Virginia	Scott Stadium; Charlottesville, VA (rivalry)	L 13–14	44,300	
September 26	1:00 p.m.	Syracuse	Lane Stadium; Blacksburg, VA	L 21–35	33,300	
October 3	1:00 p.m.	Navy	Lane Stadium; Blacksburg, VA	W 31–11	35,000	
October 10	1:30 p.m.	at South Carolina	Williams–Brice Stadium; Columbia, SC	L 10–40	73,150	
October 17	1:00 p.m.	East Carolina^{†}	Lane Stadium; Blacksburg, VA	L 23–32	38,300	
October 24	8:30 p.m.	at Tulane	Louisiana Superdome; New Orleans, LA	L 38–57	31,280	
October 31	7:30 p.m.	at Kentucky	Commonwealth Stadium; Lexington, KY	L 7–14	50,432	
November 7	1:00 p.m.	at West Virginia	Mountaineer Field; Morgantown, WV (rivalry)	L 16–28	47,322	
November 14	7:30 p.m.	at No. 3 Miami (FL)	Miami Orange Bowl; Miami, FL (rivalry)	L 13–27	40,105	
November 21	1:00 p.m.	Cincinnati	Lane Stadium; Blacksburg, VA	W 21–20	10,600	
^{†}Homecoming; Rankings from AP Poll released prior to the game; All times are in Eastern time

== Game Summaries ==
=== No. 10 Clemson ===
Team	1	2	3	4	Total
• No. 10 Clemson	3	6	6	7	22
Virginia Tech	3	0	0	10	13

- Date: September 12
- Location: Lane Stadium, Blacksburg, VA
- Game start: 1:00 p.m. EST
- Elapsed time: 2:40
- Game attendance: 42,000
- Game weather: Sunny, 75 °F (24 °C), Winds W 5 mph (8.0 km/h)

Scoring summary
1	09:28	Clemson	David Treadwell 27-yard field goal	Clemson 3–0
1	01:14	VT	Chris Kinzer 48-yard field goal	Tied 3–3
2	10:31	Clemson	David Treadwell 39-yard field goal	Clemson 6–3
2	00:02	Clemson	David Treadwell 31-yard field goal	Clemson 9–3
3	12:54	Clemson	Wesley McFadden 44-yard rush (kick failed)	Clemson 15–3
4	10:18	Clemson	Wesley McFadden 89-yard rush (David Treadwell kick)	Clemson 22–3
4	10:05	VT	Jon Jeffries 92-yard kickoff return (Chris Kinzer kick)	Clemson 22–10

Box Score

No. 10 Clemson defeated Virginia Tech 22–10 in Frank Beamer's coaching debut, as the Tigers' rushing attack and defensive pressure controlled the game from start to finish. Wesley McFadden carried 226 yards and two touchdowns on 60 rushing attempts that generated 308 yards on the ground. Michael Dean Perry led a defensive effort that sacked Erik Chapman seven times for 56 yards in losses, limiting Virginia Tech to just 60 total yards and six first downs.

Virginia Tech's only moments of offense came in flashes. Chris Kinzer provided the first points of the Beamer era with a 48-yard field goal at the 1:14 mark of the first quarter, briefly knotting the score at 3–3. The Hokies' lone touchdown came when Jon Jeffries turned a kickoff into a 92-yard sprint down the sideline in the fourth quarter, bringing the score to 22–10 with the extra point. Chapman completed just 6 of 17 passes for 37 yards and threw two interceptions in a performance that reflected the gap between a rebuilding program and a top-ten opponent.

Victor Jones led the Virginia Tech defense with 16 tackles and two forced fumbles, and both Randy Cockrell and Greg Drew posted 14 stops apiece.

=== Virginia ===
Team	1	2	3	4	Total
Virginia Tech	0	7	0	6	13
• Virginia	7	7	0	0	14

- Date: September 19
- Location: Scott Stadium, Charlottesville, VA
- Game start: 1:00 p.m. EST
- Elapsed time: 2:42
- Game attendance: 44,300
- Game weather: Cloudy, 60 °F (16 °C), Variable wind

Scoring summary
1	05:53	Virginia	Keith Mattioli 29-yard pass from Scott Secules (Mark Inderlied kick)	Virginia 7–0
2	13:48	Virginia	Scott Secules 1-yard rush (Mark Inderlied kick)	Virginia 14–0
2	02:35	VT	Earnie Jones 3-yard rush (Chris Kinzer kick)	Virginia 14–7
4	01:24	VT	Steve Johnson 26-yard pass from Erik Chapman (2-point conversion failed)	Virginia 14–13

Box Score

Virginia's 14–13 victory in the Commonwealth Cup game turned on Virginia's early scoring and Virginia Tech's failed two-point conversion attempt in the final minute. The victory marked Virginia's 9th win in 10 games against the Hokies.

Keith Mattioli opened the scoring with a 29-yard touchdown reception from Scott Secules at the 5:53 mark of the first quarter. Scott Secules extended Virginia's lead to 14–0 with a 1-yard touchdown run with 13:48 remaining in the second quarter. Earnie Jones cut the deficit to 14–7 with a 3-yard touchdown run with 2:35 remaining in the half. After a scoreless third quarter, Erik Chapman engineered a fourth-quarter drive and found Steve Johnson on a 26-yard touchdown pass with 1:24 remaining. Beamer opted for the win, declining the extra point and attempting a two-point conversion that would give Virginia Tech the lead, but the attempt failed, preserving Virginia's 14–13 victory.

Chapman completed 13 of 26 passes for 187 yards, Jones contributed 60 rushing yards on 13 carries, and the Hokies converted 8 of 18 third-down attempts. The defense forced two turnovers and held Virginia to 197 passing yards from Secules. The loss came within a single play of a road win over a quality opponent in just the second game of the Beamer era.

=== Syracuse ===
Team	1	2	3	4	Total
• Syracuse	0	7	14	14	35
Virginia Tech	14	7	0	0	21

- Date: September 26
- Location: Lane Stadium, Blacksburg, VA
- Game start: 1:00 p.m. EST
- Elapsed time: 2:49
- Game attendance: 33,300
- Game weather: Clear, 72 °F (22 °C), Winds W 6 mph (9.7 km/h)

Scoring summary
1	12:15	VT	Steve Johnson 8-yard pass from Erik Chapman (Chris Kinzer kick)	VT 7–0
1	09:52	VT	Myron Richardson 9-yard pass from Erik Chapman (Chris Kinzer kick)	VT 14–0
2	12:35	Syracuse	Michael Owens 34-yard pass from Don McPherson (Tim Vesling kick)	VT 14–7
2	09:41	VT	Don Stokes 0-yard blocked punt return (Chris Kinzer kick)	VT 21–7
3	06:59	Syracuse	Chris Barnes 4-yard rush (Tim Vesling kick)	Tied 21–21
3	01:16	Syracuse	Tommy Kane 17-yard pass from Don McPherson (Tim Vesling kick)	Syracuse 28–21
4	10:54	Syracuse	Robert Drummond 51-yard rush (Tim Vesling kick)	Syracuse 35–21
4	07:07	Syracuse	Tommy Kane 11-yard pass from Don McPherson (Tim Vesling kick)	Syracuse 35–21

Box Score

Virginia Tech built a 21–7 halftime lead over Syracuse before the Orangemen — led by Don McPherson — scored 28 unanswered points in the second half to win 35–21 at Lane Stadium. Syracuse outgained Virginia Tech 442 to 213 yards for the game, with the Orangemen's rushing attack generating 256 yards compared to Virginia Tech's minus-1 yard on the ground.

The first half belonged entirely to Virginia Tech. Steve Johnson caught an 8-yard touchdown pass from Erik Chapman with 12:15 remaining in the first quarter, and Myron Richardson added a 9-yard touchdown reception with 9:52 left to give the Hokies a 14–0 lead. Michael Owens got Syracuse on the board with a 34-yard touchdown reception from McPherson with 12:35 remaining in the second quarter, but Don Stokes blocked a punt and returned it 0 yards for a touchdown with 9:41 left to extend Virginia Tech's lead to 21–7 at halftime.

The second half was a different game entirely. Chris Barnes scored on a 4-yard run with 6:59 remaining in the third quarter to cut the deficit to 21–14, and Tommy Kane caught a 17-yard touchdown pass from McPherson with 1:16 left in the quarter to tie the game at 21–21. Robert Drummond broke the tie with a 51-yard touchdown run with 10:54 remaining in the fourth quarter, and Kane added an 11-yard touchdown reception with 7:07 left to cap the scoring. Chapman finished with 214 passing yards and two touchdowns against two interceptions, while Richardson led the receivers with five catches for 99 yards.

=== Navy ===
Team	1	2	3	4	Total
Navy	0	3	0	8	11
• Virginia Tech	7	7	7	10	31

- Date: October 3
- Location: Lane Stadium, Blacksburg, VA
- Game start: 1:00 p.m. EST
- Elapsed time: 2:28
- Game attendance: 35,000
- Game weather: Partly Cloudy, 70 °F (21 °C), Winds NNW 10 mph (16 km/h)

Scoring summary
1	03:53	VT	Sean Donnelly 10-yard rush (Chris Kinzer kick)	VT 7–0
2	12:03	Navy	Frank Schenk 20-yard field goal	VT 7–3
2	03:33	VT	Myron Richardson 9-yard pass from Erik Chapman (Chris Kinzer kick)	VT 14–3
3	13:06	VT	Jon Jeffries 56-yard rush (Chris Kinzer kick)	VT 21–3
4	09:37	VT	Chris Kinzer 39-yard field goal	VT 24–3
4	03:08	VT	Randy Cockrell 90-yard interception return (Chris Kinzer kick)	VT 31–3
4	00:03	Navy	Carl Jordan 8-yard pass from Alton Grizzard (2-point conversion failed)	VT 31–11

Box Score

Virginia Tech defeated Navy 31–11 at Lane Stadium for Frank Beamer's first victory as a college head coach.

The Hokies scored on their first possession and never trailed. Sean Donnelly opened the scoring with a 10-yard touchdown run with 3:53 remaining in the first quarter. Frank Schenk got Navy on the board with a 20-yard field goal with 12:03 remaining in the second quarter, but Erik Chapman extended Virginia Tech's lead to 14–3 at halftime with a 9-yard touchdown pass to Myron Richardson with 3:33 left in the half. Jon Jeffries broke free for a 56-yard touchdown run with 13:06 remaining in the third quarter — the longest scrimmage play by any Hokie all season — to increase the margin to 21–3. Chris Kinzer added a 39-yard field goal with 9:37 remaining in the fourth quarter, and Randy Cockrell intercepted a Navy pass and returned it 90 yards for a touchdown with 3:08 left. Navy added a late touchdown when Carl Jordan caught an 8-yard pass from Alton Grizzard with 3 seconds remaining, but the 2-point conversion failed. Jeffries rushed 15 times for 128 yards and a touchdown, and the defense forced three Navy turnovers.

=== South Carolina ===
Team	1	2	3	4	Total
Virginia Tech	0	10	0	0	10
• South Carolina	14	7	6	13	40

- Date: October 10
- Location: Williams-Brice Stadium, Columbia, SC
- Game start: 1:30 p.m. EST
- Elapsed time: 2:45
- Game attendance: 73,150
- Game weather: Sunny, 80 °F (27 °C), Winds S 10 mph (16 km/h)

Scoring summary
1	12:45	South Carolina	Ryan Bethea 20-yard pass from Todd Ellis (Eric Markle kick)	South Carolina 7–0
1	00:07	South Carolina	Sterling Sharpe 3-yard rush (Eric Markle kick)	South Carolina 14–0
2	09:21	VT	Earnie Jones 4-yard rush (Chris Kinzer kick)	South Carolina 14–7
2	03:51	South Carolina	Sterling Sharpe 3-yard rush (Eric Markle kick)	South Carolina 21–7
00:00	VT	Chris Kinzer 19-yard field goal	South Carolina 21–10
3	09:54	South Carolina	Eric Markle 27-yard field goal	South Carolina 24–10
3	02:03	South Carolina	Eric Markle 22-yard field goal	South Carolina 27–10
4	13:09	South Carolina	Eric Markle 30-yard field goal	South Carolina 30–10
4	10:30	South Carolina	Sterling Sharpe 17-yard rush (Eric Markle kick)	South Carolina 37–10
4	04:32	South Carolina	Eric Markle 31-yard field goal	South Carolina 40–10

Box Score

Sterling Sharpe was the most dangerous player on the field at Williams-Brice Stadium, carrying the South Carolina rushing attack for three touchdowns while Todd Ellis took full advantage of a Hokie secondary that could not keep pace with the Gamecocks' balanced attack. South Carolina accumulated 502 total yards — 351 of them through the air — in front of 73,150 fans, and the margin was never genuinely in doubt after the game's opening quarter.

Ryan Bethea opened the scoring with a 20-yard touchdown reception from Todd Ellis with 12:45 remaining in the first quarter, and Sterling Sharpe added a 3-yard touchdown run with 7 seconds left to make it 14–0. Earnie Jones finished a sustained second-quarter drive with a 4-yard touchdown run with 9:21 remaining to cut the deficit to 14–7, but Sharpe responded with another 3-yard touchdown run with 3:51 left in the half. Chris Kinzer connected on a 19-yard field goal as time expired at halftime to send the teams to the locker room at 21–10. The Hokie defense created its own opportunities — recovering three South Carolina fumbles — but could not translate the turnovers into points before the Gamecocks pulled decisively away in the second half with four field goals and another Sharpe touchdown.

Chapman completed 16 of 31 passes for just 101 yards, was sacked three times, and threw two interceptions against a defense that smothered the Hokie passing game all afternoon. Jones led the offense with his 4-yard scoring run, and Steve Johnson caught seven passes for 30 yards as the Gamecocks dared Virginia Tech to throw short. South Carolina outgained the Hokies 502 to 187 yards — a gap that told the story of an afternoon in which the visitors were simply outmanned.

=== East Carolina ===
Team	1	2	3	4	Total
• East Carolina	0	13	6	13	32
Virginia Tech	10	7	6	0	23

- Date: October 17
- Location: Lane Stadium, Blacksburg, VA
- Game start: 12:59 p.m. EST
- Elapsed time: 2:47
- Game attendance: 38,300
- Game weather: Clear sunny, 58 °F (14 °C), Winds SW 5 mph (8.0 km/h)

Scoring summary
1	09:25	VT	Chris Kinzer 49-yard field goal	VT 3–0
1	04:10	VT	Myron Richardson 20-yard pass from Erik Chapman (Chris Kinzer kick)	VT 10–0
2	14:16	East Carolina	Travis Hunter 1-yard rush (Chuck Berleth kick)	VT 10–7
2	08:23	VT	Erik Chapman 1-yard rush (Chris Kinzer kick)	VT 17–7
2	02:05	East Carolina	Chuck Berleth 40-yard field goal	VT 17–10
2	00:00	East Carolina	Chuck Berleth 34-yard field goal	Tied 17–17
3	11:36	East Carolina	Travis Hunter 35-yard rush (Chuck Berleth kick failed)	East Carolina 19–17
3	04:57	VT	Karl Borden 10-yard pass from Erik Chapman (2-point conversion failed)	East Carolina 19–23
4	09:21	East Carolina	Travis Hunter 6-yard rush (Chuck Berleth kick failed)	East Carolina 25–23
4	04:10	East Carolina	Tim James 74-yard pass from Travis Hunter (Chuck Berleth kick)	East Carolina 32–23

Box Score

Virginia Tech's homecoming game against East Carolina was a contest the Hokies had controlled for three quarters before the Pirates scored twice in the final period to take a 32–23 victory at Lane Stadium. The offense generated 392 yards — one of its better outputs of the season — and the defense kept things competitive through the critical middle quarters.

Virginia Tech scored on its first two possessions to build a 10–0 first-quarter lead. Chris Kinzer opened the scoring with a 49-yard field goal with 9:25 remaining, and Chapman followed with a 20-yard touchdown pass to Myron Richardson with 4:10 left in the quarter. Travis Hunter cut the deficit to 10–7 with a 1-yard touchdown run with 14:16 remaining in the second quarter, but Chapman extended Virginia Tech's lead to 17–7 with a 1-yard rushing touchdown with 8:23 left in the half. Chuck Berleth connected on field goals of 40 and 34 yards to cut Virginia Tech's lead to 17–17 at halftime. Hunter gave East Carolina its first lead with a 35-yard touchdown run with 11:36 remaining in the third quarter, but Chapman answered with a 10-yard touchdown pass to Karl Borden with 4:57 left in the quarter. The two-point conversion that followed was unsuccessful, keeping Virginia Tech ahead 23–19.

The fourth quarter produced nothing for Virginia Tech. Hunter added a 6-yard touchdown run with 9:21 remaining, and Travis Hunter connected with Tim James on a 74-yard touchdown pass with 4:10 left to cap the scoring. Jon Jeffries had been the engine of the Hokie ground game all day, carrying 27 times for 129 yards, and Chapman completed 11 of 21 passes for 164 yards and two touchdowns. The numbers were good enough to win most games — but East Carolina's offense, which had been moving the ball all afternoon, would not be stopped when it mattered most.

=== Tulane ===
Team	1	2	3	4	Total
Virginia Tech	0	7	10	21	38
• Tulane	14	16	13	14	57

- Date: October 24
- Location: Louisiana Superdome, New Orleans, LA
- Game start: 7:30 p.m. EST
- Elapsed time: 2:52
- Game attendance: 31,280
- Game weather: Indoors, 72 °F (22 °C), No wind

Scoring summary
1	08:59	Tulane	Marvin Allen 4-yard rush (Todd Wiggins kick)	Tulane 7–0
1	08:39	Tulane	Melvin Adams 4-yard rush (Todd Wiggins kick)	Tulane 14–0
2	14:51	Tulane	Marc Zeno 7-yard pass from Terrence Jones (Todd Wiggins kick)	Tulane 21–0
2	09:34	Tulane	Marvin Allen 4-yard rush (Todd Wiggins kick failed)	Tulane 27–0
2	08:42	VT	Steve Johnson 59-yard pass from Erik Chapman (Chris Kinzer kick)	Tulane 27–7
2	00:15	Tulane	Todd Wiggins 20-yard field goal	Tulane 30–7
3	14:47	Tulane	Michael Pierce 89-yard kickoff return (Todd Wiggins kick)	Tulane 37–7
3	09:47	VT	Chris Kinzer 32-yard field goal	Tulane 37–10
3	09:25	Tulane	Marvin Allen 76-yard pass from Terrence Jones (Todd Wiggins kick failed)	Tulane 43–10
00:56	VT	Myron Richardson 7-yard pass from Erik Chapman (Chris Kinzer kick)	Tulane 43–17
4	13:55	Tulane	Marvin Allen 1-yard rush (Todd Wiggins kick)	Tulane 50–17
4	12:54	Tulane	Jerome McIntosh 16-yard pass from Terrence Jones (Todd Wiggins kick)	Tulane 57–17
4	10:16	VT	Ralph Brown 6-yard rush (Chris Kinzer kick)	Tulane 57–24
4	06:56	VT	Lamar Smith 2-yard rush (Chris Kinzer kick)	Tulane 57–31
4	00:00	VT	Nick Cullen 15-yard pass from Chris Baucia (Chris Kinzer kick)	Tulane 57–38

Box Score

The highest-scoring game of Virginia Tech's 1987 season ended in a 57–38 defeat at the Louisiana Superdome, where Tulane's Terrence Jones threw for 362 yards and three touchdowns and the Green Wave used a second-half kickoff return to break the contest open. Virginia Tech trailed 30–7 at halftime and 43–17 as the third quarter wound down before mounting a spirited late rally that produced three fourth-quarter touchdowns in a losing cause.

Tulane scored on its first two possessions with Marvin Allen and Melvin Adams each adding 4-yard touchdown runs in the first quarter. Marc Zeno caught a 7-yard touchdown pass from Jones with 14:51 remaining in the second quarter, and Allen added another 4-yard touchdown run with 9:34 left before Steve Johnson gave the Hokies their first points with a 59-yard touchdown reception from Chapman with 8:42 remaining in the half. Todd Wiggins connected on a 20-yard field goal as time expired to give Tulane a 30–7 halftime lead. Michael Pierce returned the second-half kickoff 89 yards for a touchdown, but Chris Kinzer answered with a 32-yard field goal. Marvin Allen caught a 76-yard touchdown pass from Jones with 9:25 remaining in the third quarter, and Myron Richardson added a 7-yard touchdown reception from Chapman with 56 seconds left in the quarter to make it 43–17.

When the fourth quarter arrived with the game seemingly out of reach, Virginia Tech refused to quit. Ralph Brown scored on a 6-yard run with 13:55 remaining, Lamar Smith added a 2-yard touchdown run with 6:56 left, and backup Chris Baucia hit Nick Cullen with a 15-yard scoring pass in relief of Chapman as time expired to close the final margin. Brown was the offensive catalyst with 110 yards and a touchdown on 17 carries, and Johnson caught four passes for 95 yards and the first score. Virginia Tech's 456 yards of total offense was its highest output of the season, though Tulane matched with 480 of its own. The three fourth-quarter touchdowns — produced against a defense that had every reason to coast — said something about a team that, even in its worst moments, would not stop competing.

=== Kentucky ===
Team	1	2	3	4	Total
Virginia Tech	0	0	0	7	7
• Kentucky	14	0	0	0	14

- Date: October 31
- Location: Commonwealth Stadium, Lexington, KY
- Game start: 7:30 p.m. EST
- Elapsed time: 2:35
- Game attendance: 50,432
- Game weather: Clear skies, 69 °F (21 °C), Winds SE 5 mph (8.0 km/h)

Scoring summary
1	12:11	Kentucky	Jimmie O'Neal 14-yard pass from Kevin Dooley (Joey Worley kick)	Kentucky 7–0
1	10:03	Kentucky	Mark Higgs 52-yard rush (Joey Worley kick)	Kentucky 14–0
4	01:45	VT	Earnie Jones 2-yard pass from Erik Chapman (Chris Kinzer Kick)	Kentucky 14–7

Box Score

Virginia Tech played arguably its most complete defensive game of the season at Commonwealth Stadium, holding the Wildcats scoreless for three and a half quarters after surrendering two touchdowns in the game's opening four minutes. Kevin Dooley hit Jimmie O'Neal with a 14-yard touchdown pass with 12:11 remaining in the first quarter, and Mark Higgs burst through the right side of the Hokie line for a 52-yard scoring run with 10:03 left to put Kentucky ahead 14–0, and that was all the cushion the Wildcats needed.

The Virginia Tech defense held Kentucky scoreless after the first quarter. Three sacks, a Roger Brown interception, and pressure on third downs — the Wildcats converted just 1 of 13 third-down attempts for the game — gave the offense opportunities to cut into the lead. Chapman was sacked seven times for 60 yards in losses and completed 15 of 33 passes for 130 yards as Kentucky's front seven controlled the line of scrimmage.

Virginia Tech's lone score came at the 1:45 mark of the fourth quarter when Chapman hit Earnie Jones with a 2-yard touchdown pass, and Chris Kinzer's extra point cut the margin to 14–7. The Hokies could not regain possession before time expired. Scott Hill led the defense with 12 tackles, Greg Drew added 11 and forced a fumble, and Nate Bradley recorded a sack.

=== West Virginia ===
Team	1	2	3	4	Total
Virginia Tech	3	7	0	6	16
• West Virginia	7	0	7	14	28

- Date: November 7
- Location: Mountaineer Field, Morgantown, WV
- Game start: 1:00 p.m. EST
- Elapsed time: 2:43
- Game attendance: 47,322
- Game weather: Cool and smoky, 53 °F (12 °C), Winds SSW 11 mph (18 km/h)

Scoring summary
1	10:55	VT	Chris Kinzer 45-yard field goal	VT 3–0
1	03:09	WVU	Harvey Smith 13-yard pass from Major Harris (Charlie Baumann kick)	WVU 7–3
2	05:50	VT	Brian McCall 4-yard pass from Erik Chapman (Chris Kinzer kick)	VT 10–7
3	05:11	WVU	Craig Taylor 1-yard rush (Charlie Baumann kick)	WVU 14–10
4	13:59	WVU	Anthony Brown 2-yard rush (Charlie Baumann kick)	WVU 21–10
4	06:46	VT	Erik Chapman 40-yard rush (Erik Chapman pass failed)	WVU 21–16
4	03:22	WVU	Eugene Napoleon 4-yard rush (Charlie Baumann kick)	WVU 28–16

Box Score

Forest fires burning in the hills above Morgantown had reduced visibility to three-quarters of a mile and filled the air with smoke by the time Virginia Tech and West Virginia kicked off on November 7, giving the afternoon an atmosphere as unsettling as the game itself. A. B. Brown gave the Mountaineers an overwhelming ground presence, carrying 30 times for 169 yards and a touchdown as West Virginia controlled the trenches and won 28–16.

Chris Kinzer put Virginia Tech on the board first with a 45-yard field goal at the 10:55 mark of the first quarter. The Hokies reclaimed the lead in the second quarter when Chapman directed a seven-play, 30-yard drive and found tight end Brian McCall with a 4-yard touchdown pass to push the score to 10–7 at halftime. Virginia Tech's defense was generating havoc throughout — forcing six West Virginia fumbles and recovering four, a season high — but the offense could not convert the turnovers into enough points to overcome Brown's relentless production.

Trailing 21–10 in the fourth quarter, Chapman delivered the most electric play of his season, breaking contain on a scramble and racing 40 yards for a touchdown to cut the deficit to 21–16. The two-point conversion pass failed, West Virginia answered with a Eugene Napoleonscoring run, and the Hokies' final drive came up short. Randy Cockrell finished with a season-high 24 tackles — the most by any Hokie in a single game all year — and Scott Hill added 19 stops and a sack in a defensive performance that hinted at what this unit might grow into.

=== No. 3 Miami (FL) ===
Team	1	2	3	4	Total
Virginia Tech	0	10	3	0	13
• No. 3 Miami (FL)	3	7	3	14	27

- Date: November 14
- Location: Orange Bowl, Miami, FL
- Game start: 7:30 p.m. EST
- Elapsed time: 2:30
- Game attendance: 40,105
- Game weather: Mostly cloudy, 77 °F (25 °C), Winds E 15 mph (24 km/h)

Scoring summary
1	01:44	UM	Greg Cox 26-yard field goal	UM 3–0
2	07:13	VT	Nick Cullen 24-yard pass from Jon Jeffries (Chris Kinzer kick)	VT 7–3
2	04:15	UM	Michael Irvin 18-yard pass from Steve Walsh (Greg Cox kick)	UM 10–7
2	00:00	VT	Chris Kinzer 31-yard field goal	Tied 10–10
3	06:09	UM	Greg Cox 41-yard field goal	UM 13–10
3	01:40	VT	Chris Kinzer 33-yard field goal	Tied 13–13
4	04:51	UM	Melvin Bratton 1-yard rush (Greg Cox kick)	UM 20–13
4	00:34	UM	A. Roberts 2-yard pass from Steve Walsh (Greg Cox kick)	UM 27–13

Box Score

No. 3 Miami came to the Orange Bowl on November 14 with an 8–0 record and a defense loaded with future NFL players, and Virginia Tech came within one quarter of pulling the upset of the year. The Hokies entered the fourth quarter tied 13–13 with the Hurricanes, holding the ball for more than 33 minutes on the night and committing not a single turnover against a defense that had dismantled every opponent it had faced.

The Hokies trailed 3–0 after the first quarter before Jon Jeffries took a direct snap at the 7:13 mark of the second quarter and threw a 24-yard halfback pass to Nick Cullen in the end zone to give Virginia Tech a 7–3 lead. Michael Irvin's 18-yard touchdown catch from Steve Walsh put Miami back in front 10–7, but Chapman drove the Hokies 64 yards on 11 plays and Kinzer split the uprights from 31 yards as time expired in the half to send the teams to the locker room knotted at 10–10. The third quarter belonged to the kickers: Greg Cox (American football) connected from 41 yards for Miami, and Kinzer answered at the 1:40 mark with a 33-yarder of his own to restore the tie at 13–13.

Miami scored twice in the fourth period with touchdowns by Melvin Bratton and Warren Williams for a 27–13 final. Carter Wiley led Virginia Tech with 15 tackles, Scott Hill added 11, and Chapman completed 12 of 19 passes for 130 yards despite three sacks from a Miami front anchored by Greg Mark and George Mira Jr..

=== Cincinnati ===
Team	1	2	3	4	Total
Cincinnati	0	0	0	20	20
• Virginia Tech	7	7	0	7	21

- Date: November 21
- Location: Lane Stadium, Blacksburg, VA
- Game start: 1:00 p.m. EST
- Elapsed time: 2:44
- Game attendance: 10,600
- Game weather: Sunny & cold, 25 °F (−4 °C), Winds NNW 20 mph (32 km/h)

Scoring summary
1	08:11	VT	Sean Donnelly 37-yard rush (Chris Kinzer Kick)	VT 7–0
2	11:45	VT	Jon Jeffries 3-yard rush (Chris Kinzer Kick)	VT 14–0
4	13:16	Cincinnati	Al McKinney 1-yard rush (Phil Insalaco Kick)	VT 14–7
4	11:45	VT	Jon Jeffries 42-yard rush (Chris Kinzer Kick)	VT 21–7
4	07:21	Cincinnati	Roosevelt Mukes 18-yard pass from Danny McCoin (Phil Insalaco Kick)	VT 21–14
4	03:27	Cincinnati	Al McKinney 2-yard rush (Danny McCoin Pass Failed)	VT 21–20

Box Score

Virginia Tech closed the 1987 season with a 21–20 victory over Cincinnati on November 21 at Lane Stadium that they almost lost. Only 10,600 fans came to the game in the 25-degree weather

Sean Donnelly scored on a 37-yard touchdown run with 8:11 remaining in the first quarter, capping a 6-play, 61-yard opening drive. Jon Jeffries extended the lead to 14–0 in the second quarter with a 3-yard scoring run with 11:45 remaining in the half. The Hokies missed a field goal attempt before halftime but maintained a two-score lead through three quarters.

Cincinnati finally broke through with 13:16 remaining in the fourth quarter when Al McKinney scored on a 1-yard run to cut the deficit to 14–7. Jeffries answered with a 42-yard touchdown burst with 11:45 left to push the lead back to 21–7, but Roosevelt Mukescaught an 18-yard touchdown pass from Danny McCoin with 7:21 remaining to make it 21–14. McKinney added a 2-yard touchdown run with 3:27 left, but the two-point conversion pass failed, preserving Virginia Tech's 21–20 victory. Jeffries carried 24 times for 160 yards and two touchdowns, and the defense blocked a Bearcat field goal attempt in the third quarter.

== Roster ==
1987 Virginia Tech Hokies football team roster
Players
Coaches
Offense

Pos.	#	Name	Class
QB	14	Chris Baucia	Fr
WR	31	Tim Balley	Fr
TE	81	Ken Barefoot	So
RB	11	Malcolm Blacken	Jr
OL	57	William Boatwright	Fr
WR	20	Karl Borden	Fr
OL	65	Nate Bradley	Jr
OL	77	Mark Briscoe	Fr
RB	3	Ralph Brown	Fr
FB	30	George Bruce	Fr
QB	16	Erik Chapman	Sr
OL	69	Eugene Chung	Fr
RB	45	Carl Coles	Fr
OL	75	Bill Cox	So
OL	59	Bob Cromwell	So
WR	48	Nick Cullen	Fr
OL	73	Ernie Davis	So
WR	25	Danny Eddy	So
WR	46	David Everett	Sr
OL	61	John FitzHugh	Sr
FB	43	Rich Fox	So
QB	2	Will Furrer	Fr
OL	58	Rodney Good	Sr
OL	70	Todd Grantham	Jr
OL	56	Steve Hale	Jr
OL	60	Tom Hall	So
OL	52	Chris Henderson	So
LB	88	Darwin Herdman	Fr
OL	63	Kenny Jefferson	Fr
WR	27	Jon Jeffries	Fr
OL	66	Stacy Johnson	Jr
TE	87	Steve Johnson	Sr
FB	49	Earnie Jones	Sr
OL	51	Kevin Keeffe	Sr
FB	47	George Moore	So
WR	24	Taron Page	Fr
OL	72	Larry Peery	So
WR	82	Shawn Prather	So
WR	22	Myron Richardson	So
WR	1	Jeff Roberts	Jr
TE	89	Richard Saunders	Fr
RB	28	Lamar Smith	Fr
TE	94	Rodney Varney	Sr
OL	55	Rob Vaughan	Fr
WR	1	John Viise	Fr
OL	53	Glenn Watts	Fr

Defense

Pos.	#	Name	Class
LB	41	Jamel Agemy	Sr
LB	44	Leslie Bailey	So
DB	97	Bill Balley	Fr
LB	31	Tim Boitnott	Fr
DB	6	Roger Brown	So
LB	50	Todd Brown	Fr
DL	97	Al Chamblee	Fr
LB	39	Randy Cockrell	So
DB	3	Ashley Cockrell	So
DL	67	Bo Cothran	So
LB	91	Greg Drew	Sr
DB	23	Mitch Dove	So
DB	19	Will Gowin	So
DB	35	John Granby	Fr
LB	85	Shon Grantz	Fr
LB	88	Darwin Herdman	Fr
DL	66	Scott Hill	So
LB	40	Jock Jones	So
LB	34	Victor Jones	Sr
LB	92	Randolph Kidd	Jr
DL	95	Joe Ledbetter	Jr
LB	21	Sleve Mitchem	Jr
DB	13	Billy Myers	Sr
LB	37	Eddie Neel	Sr
DB	17	Joe Perry	Sr
DB	38	Scott Rice	So
LB	32	Don Stokes	So
DL	98	Chuck Watson	Jr
LB	42	Lawrence White	Sr
DL	96	Jimmy Whitten	Fr
DL	74	Al Wiley	Sr
DB	36	Carter Wiley	Sr
DB	29	Jeff Williams	Jr
DL	83	Rich Williams	Fr

Special teams

Pos.	#	Name	Class
K	9	Sandy Bowen	Jr
P	8	Stephen Grabeel	Fr
K	4	Chris Kinzer	Jr
P	12	Tony Romero	Sr

Head coach

- Frank Beamer

Coordinators/assistant coaches

- Ron Zook
  (Defensive coordinator)

Legend

- (C) Team captain
- (S) Suspended
- (I) Ineligible
- Injured
- Redshirt

Roster

== Awards and honors ==
=== All-Conference selections ===
- Scott Hill – First Team All-Independent (Linebacker)
- Randy Cockrell – Second Team All-Independent (Defensive Back)

== NFL Draft ==
The following Hokies were selected in the 1988 NFL Draft:

Round	Pick	Player	Position	Team
8	203	Steve Johnson	Tight End	Miami Dolphins

Undrafted free agents:

- Scott Hill – Linebacker – Various teams
