= 1987 Southwestern Louisiana Ragin' Cajuns football team =

American college football season

1987 Southwestern Louisiana Ragin' Cajuns football
- Conference: Independent
- Record: 6–5
- Head coach: Nelson Stokley (2nd season)
- Home stadium: Cajun Field

1987 NCAA Division I-A independents football records
	Conf.					Overall
Team	W		L		T	W		L		T
No. 1 Miami (FL)		–		–		12	–	0	–	0
No. 4 Syracuse		–		–		11	–	0	–	1
No. 2 Florida State		–		–		11	–	1	–	0
No. 15 South Carolina		–		–		8	–	4	–	0
Pittsburgh		–		–		8	–	4	–	0
Penn State		–		–		8	–	4	–	0
No. 17 Notre Dame		–		–		8	–	4	–	0
Southern Miss		–		–		6	–	5	–	0
Rutgers		–		–		6	–	5	–	0
Southwestern Louisiana		–		–		6	–	5	–	0
Memphis State		–		–		5	–	5	–	1
Northern Illinois		–		–		5	–	5	–	1
West Virginia		–		–		6	–	6	–	0
Tulane		–		–		6	–	6	–	0
Army		–		–		5	–	6	–	0
Boston College		–		–		5	–	6	–	0
East Carolina		–		–		5	–	6	–	0
Akron		–		–		4	–	7	–	0
Cincinnati		–		–		4	–	7	–	0
Louisville		–		–		3	–	7	–	1
Temple		–		–		3	–	8	–	0
Tulsa		–		–		3	–	8	–	0
Virginia Tech		–		–		2	–	9	–	0
Navy		–		–		2	–	9	–	0
Rankings from AP Poll

The 1987 Southwestern Louisiana Ragin' Cajuns football team was an American football team that represented the University of Southwestern Louisiana (now known as the University of Louisiana at Lafayette) as an independent during the 1987 NCAA Division I-A football season. In their second year under head coach Nelson Stokley, the team compiled a 6–5 record.

== Schedule ==
Date	Opponent	Site	Result	Attendance	Source
September 5	at Mississippi State	Scott Field; Starkville, MS	L 3–31	26,580	
September 12	UNLV	Cajun Field; Lafayette, LA	W 21–10	16,241	
September 26	at Oklahoma State	Lewis Field; Stillwater, OK	L 0–36	44,100	
October 3	at No. 17 Alabama	Legion Field; Birmingham, AL	L 10–38	72,233	
October 10	Northwestern State	Cajun Field; Lafayette, LA	W 13–3	19,502	
October 17	at Ole Miss	Vaught–Hemingway Stadium; Oxford, MS	L 14–24	18,700	
October 24	at Northeast Louisiana	Malone Stadium; Monroe, LA (rivalry)	W 17–7	18,783	
November 7	Memphis State	Cajun Field; Lafayette, LA	W 31–7	20,052	
November 14	at Tulane	Louisiana Superdome; New Orleans, LA	L 10–38	31,253	
November 21	Colorado State	Cajun Field; Lafayette, LA	W 35–28	14,031	
November 28	Southern Miss	Cajun Field; Lafayette, LA	W 37–30	17,500	
Rankings from AP Poll released prior to the game
