= 1987 Florida State Seminoles football team =

American college football season

1987 Florida State Seminoles football

National champion (Berryman) Fiesta Bowl champion

Fiesta Bowl, W 31–28 vs. Nebraska
- Conference: Independent

Ranking
- Coaches: No. 2
- AP: No. 2
- Record: 11–1
- Head coach: Bobby Bowden (12th season)
- Offensive coordinator: Wayne McDuffie (5th season)
- Offensive scheme: I formation, Pro set
- Defensive coordinator: Mickey Andrews (4th season)
- Base defense: 4–3
- Captains: Danny McManus; Paul McGowan; Marty Riggs; Pat Carter
- Home stadium: Doak Campbell Stadium

1987 NCAA Division I-A independents football records
	Conf.					Overall
Team	W		L		T	W		L		T
No. 1 Miami (FL)		–		–		12	–	0	–	0
No. 4 Syracuse		–		–		11	–	0	–	1
No. 2 Florida State		–		–		11	–	1	–	0
No. 15 South Carolina		–		–		8	–	4	–	0
Pittsburgh		–		–		8	–	4	–	0
Penn State		–		–		8	–	4	–	0
No. 17 Notre Dame		–		–		8	–	4	–	0
Southern Miss		–		–		6	–	5	–	0
Rutgers		–		–		6	–	5	–	0
Southwestern Louisiana		–		–		6	–	5	–	0
Memphis State		–		–		5	–	5	–	1
Northern Illinois		–		–		5	–	5	–	1
West Virginia		–		–		6	–	6	–	0
Tulane		–		–		6	–	6	–	0
Army		–		–		5	–	6	–	0
Boston College		–		–		5	–	6	–	0
East Carolina		–		–		5	–	6	–	0
Akron		–		–		4	–	7	–	0
Cincinnati		–		–		4	–	7	–	0
Louisville		–		–		3	–	7	–	1
Temple		–		–		3	–	8	–	0
Tulsa		–		–		3	–	8	–	0
Virginia Tech		–		–		2	–	9	–	0
Navy		–		–		2	–	9	–	0
Rankings from AP Poll

The 1987 Florida State Seminoles football team represented Florida State University as an independent during the 1987 NCAA Division I-A football season. Led by 12th-year head coach Bobby Bowden, the Seminoles compiled a record of 11–1 with win in the Fiesta Bowl over Nebraska. Florida State played home games at Doak Campbell Stadium in Tallahassee, Florida. The team was selected national champion by Berryman.

== Schedule ==
Date	Time	Opponent	Rank	Site	TV	Result	Attendance	Source
September 5	7:00 p.m.	Texas Tech	No. 8	Doak Campbell Stadium; Tallahassee, FL		W 40–16	52,893	
September 12	7:00 p.m.	at East Carolina	No. 8	Ficklen Memorial Stadium; Greenville, NC		W 44–3	33,937	
September 19	7:00 p.m.	Memphis State	No. 7	Doak Campbell Stadium; Tallahassee, FL		W 41–24	50,191	
September 26	1:00 p.m.	at Michigan State	No. 6	Spartan Stadium; East Lansing, MI		W 31–3	76,887	
October 3	2:30 p.m.	No. 3 Miami (FL)	No. 4	Doak Campbell Stadium; Tallahassee, FL (rivalry)	CBS	L 25–26	62,561	
October 10	2:00 p.m.	at Southern Miss	No. 6	M. M. Roberts Stadium; Hattiesburg, MS		W 61–10	25,853	
October 17	7:00 p.m.	Louisville	No. 4	Doak Campbell Stadium; Tallahassee, FL		W 32–9	53,114	
October 31	3:00 p.m.	Tulane^{†}	No. 4	Doak Campbell Stadium; Tallahassee, FL		W 73–14	53,210	
November 7	2:30 p.m.	at No. 6 Auburn	No. 4	Jordan-Hare Stadium; Auburn, AL	CBS	W 34–6	85,170	
November 14	2:00 p.m.	Furman	No. 4	Doak Campbell Stadium; Tallahassee, FL		W 41–10	50,087	
November 28	12:00 p.m.	at Florida	No. 3	Florida Field; Gainesville, FL (rivalry)	CBS	W 28–14	74,613	
January 1	1:30 p.m.	vs. No. 5 Nebraska	No. 3	Sun Devil Stadium; Tempe, AZ (Fiesta Bowl)	NBC	W 31–28	72,112	
^{†}Homecoming; Rankings from AP Poll released prior to the game

== Rankings ==
Ranking movements Legend: ██ Increase in ranking ██ Decrease in ranking
	Week															
Poll	Pre	1	2	3	4	5	6	7	8	9	10	11	12	13	14	Final
AP	8	8	7	6	4	6	4	4	4	4	4	4	3	3	3	2
Coaches	14	11	7	8	4	8	7	5	5	4	4	4	3	3	3	2

== Game summaries ==
=== Texas Tech ===
Team	1	2	3	4	Total
Red Raiders	13	3	0	0	16
• Seminoles	13	17	7	3	40

- Date: September 5
- Location: Doak Campbell Stadium
- Game attendance: 52,893

=== At East Carolina ===
Team	1	2	3	4	Total
• Seminoles	3	13	14	14	44
Pirates	0	3	0	0	3

- Date: September 12
- Location: Ficklen Memorial Stadium
- Game attendance: 33,937

=== Memphis State ===
Team	1	2	3	4	Total
Tigers	0	10	7	7	24
• Seminoles	21	3	7	10	41

- Date: September 19
- Location: Doak Campbell Stadium
- Game attendance: 50,191

=== At Michigan State ===
Team	1	2	3	4	Total
• Seminoles	0	7	10	14	31
Spartans	0	3	0	0	3

- Date: September 26
- Location: Spartan Stadium
  East Lansing, MI
- Game attendance: 76,887

=== Miami (FL) ===
Team	1	2	3	4	Total
• No. 3 Hurricanes	3	0	8	15	26
No. 4 Seminoles	0	10	9	6	25

- Date: October 3
- Location: Doak Campbell Stadium,
  Tallahassee, Florida
- Game attendance: 62,561
- Game weather: 78 °F (26 °C), Sunny, Wind N 15–20 mph (24–32 km/h)
- TV announcers (CBS Sports): Brent Musburger, Pat Haden, and John Dockery

Scoring summary
1	2:58	Miami	Greg Cox 29-yard field goal	Miami 3–0
2		FSU	D. Williams 1-yard run (Schmidt kick)	FSU 7–3
2	2:37	FSU	Derek Schmidt 36-yard field goal	FSU 10–3
3	7:50	FSU	Williams blocked punt return (kick failed)	FSU 16–3
3	2:37	FSU	Derek Schmidt 25-yard field goal	FSU 19–3
3		Miami	Bratton 49-yard pass from Walsh (Brian Blades pass from Walsh)	FSU 19–11
4		Miami	Irvin 26-yard pass from Walsh (Williams pass from Walsh)	Tied 19–19
4	2:22	Miami	Irvin 73-yard pass from Walsh (Cox kick)	Miami 26–19
4	0:42	FSU	Lewis 18-yard pass from McManus (pass failed)	Miami 26–25

=== At Southern Miss ===
Team	1	2	3	4	Total
• Seminoles	21	10	14	16	61
Golden Eagles	7	3	0	0	10

- Date: October 10
- Location: M. M. Roberts Stadium
- Game attendance: 25,853

=== Louisville ===
Team	1	2	3	4	Total
Cardinals	3	0	0	6	9
• Seminoles	6	12	7	7	32

- Date: October 17
- Location: Doak Campbell Stadium
- Game attendance: 53,114

=== Tulane ===
Team	1	2	3	4	Total
Green Wave	7	0	0	7	14
• Seminoles	7	31	28	7	73

- Date: October 31
- Location: Doak Campbell Stadium
- Game attendance: 53,210

=== At Auburn ===
Team	1	2	3	4	Total
• Seminoles	14	13	0	7	34
Tigers	0	3	3	0	6

- Date: November 7
- Location: Jordan–Hare Stadium
- Game attendance: 85,170

=== Furman ===
Team	1	2	3	4	Total
Paladins	7	0	0	3	10
• Seminoles	10	10	7	14	41

- Date: November 14
- Location: Doak Campbell Stadium
- Game attendance: 50,087

=== At Florida ===
Team	1	2	3	4	Total
• Seminoles	3	6	11	8	28
Gators	7	7	0	0	14

- Date: November 28
- Location: Florida Field
- Game attendance: 74,613

Scoring summary
Q1	10:10	FSU	Schmidt 26 yard field goal	FSU 3–0
Q1	2:21	FLA	E. Smith 5 yard run (McGinty kick)	FLA 7–3
Q2	14:55	FLA	E. Smith 4 yard run (McGinty kick)	FLA 14–3
Q2	2:44	FSU	Schmidt 23 yard field goal	FLA 14–6
Q2	0:00	FSU	Schmidt 53 yard field goal	FLA 14–9
Q3	10:59	FSU	Schmidt 37 yard field goal	FLA 14–12
Q3	4:50	FSU	D. Williams 1 yard run (Bennett run)	FSU 20–14
Q4	10:36	FSU	D. Williams 1 yard run (Gainer pass from McManus)	FSU 28–14

=== Vs. Nebraska—Fiesta Bowl ===
Team	1	2	3	4	Total
No. 5 Cornhuskers	14	0	14	0	28
• No. 3 Seminoles	0	21	3	7	31

- Date: January 1
- Location: Sun Devil Stadium
- Game attendance: 72,112

Scoring summary
1	Neb	Keith Jones 3-yard run (Chris Drennan kick)	Neb 7–0
1	Neb	Dana Brinson 52-yard punt return (Drennan kick)	Neb 14–0
2	FSU	Herb Gainer 10-yard pass from Danny McManus (Derek Schmidt kick)	Neb 14–7
2	FSU	Dayne Williams 4-yard run (Schmidt kick)	Tied 14–14
2	FSU	Gainer 25-yard pass from McManus (Schmidt kick)	FSU 21–14
3	Neb	Steve Taylor 2-yard run (Drennan kick)	Tied 21–21
3	FSU	Schmidt 32-yard field goal	FSU 24–21
3	Neb	Tyreese Knox 4-yard run (Drennan kick)	Neb 28–24
4	FSU	Ronald Lewis 15-yard pass from McManus (Schmidt kick)	FSU 31–28

== Roster ==
1987 Florida State Seminoles football team roster
Players
Coaches
Offense

Pos.	#	Name	Class
WR	8	Terry Anthony	So
G	61	Jim Bekas	Fr
FB	22	dayne williams	Fr
OT	50	John Brown	So
TB	13	sammie smith	So
TE	85	Pat Carter	Sr
WR	29	Lawrence Dawsey	Fr
WR	1	Scott DiMare	So
OT	69	Joey Ionata	Jr
OT	73	Anthony Johnson	Jr
QB	14	Brad Johnson	Fr
TE	45	Reggie Johnson	Fr
TB	10	Brady Jones	So
RB	33	Sammie Smith	So
QB	11	Casey Weldon	Fr
TE	87	Gaylon White	Sr
WR	23	Pat White	So
WR	82	Randy White	Sr
QB	4	Peter Tom Willis	So

Defense

Pos.	#	Name	Class
DB	6	LeRoy Butler	So
LB	47	Kevin Grant	So
FS	21	John Hadley	Jr
LB	53	Odell Haggins	So
DB	22	Kenny Kitchens	Jr
CB	32	Martin Mayhew	Sr
LB	38	Paul McGowan	Sr
FS	40	Greg Newell	Sr
DT	74	Henry Ostaszewski	Fr
DT	75	Joe Ostaszewski	Fr
LB	48	David Palmer	Sr
CB	2	Deion Sanders	Jr
LB	93	Shelton Thompson	So

Special teams

Pos.	#	Name	Class
K	18	Derek Schmidt	Sr
P	12	Rick Tuten	Sr

Head coach

- Bobby Bowden

Coordinators/assistant coaches

- Wayne McDuffie (Offensive coordinator)
- Mickey Andrews (Defensive coordinator)
- Skip Holtz (Graduate assistant)

Legend

- (C) Team captain
- (S) Suspended
- (I) Ineligible
- Injured
- Redshirt
