= 1987 East Carolina Pirates football team =

American college football season

1987 East Carolina Pirates football
- Conference: Independent
- Record: 5–6
- Head coach: Art Baker (3rd season)
- Defensive coordinator: Don Powers (3rd season)
- Home stadium: Ficklen Memorial Stadium

1987 NCAA Division I-A independents football records
	Conf.					Overall
Team	W		L		T	W		L		T
No. 1 Miami (FL)		–		–		12	–	0	–	0
No. 4 Syracuse		–		–		11	–	0	–	1
No. 2 Florida State		–		–		11	–	1	–	0
No. 15 South Carolina		–		–		8	–	4	–	0
Pittsburgh		–		–		8	–	4	–	0
Penn State		–		–		8	–	4	–	0
No. 17 Notre Dame		–		–		8	–	4	–	0
Southern Miss		–		–		6	–	5	–	0
Rutgers		–		–		6	–	5	–	0
Southwestern Louisiana		–		–		6	–	5	–	0
Memphis State		–		–		5	–	5	–	1
Northern Illinois		–		–		5	–	5	–	1
West Virginia		–		–		6	–	6	–	0
Tulane		–		–		6	–	6	–	0
Army		–		–		5	–	6	–	0
Boston College		–		–		5	–	6	–	0
East Carolina		–		–		5	–	6	–	0
Akron		–		–		4	–	7	–	0
Cincinnati		–		–		4	–	7	–	0
Louisville		–		–		3	–	7	–	1
Temple		–		–		3	–	8	–	0
Tulsa		–		–		3	–	8	–	0
Virginia Tech		–		–		2	–	9	–	0
Navy		–		–		2	–	9	–	0
Rankings from AP Poll

The 1987 East Carolina Pirates football team was an American football team that represented East Carolina University as an independent during the 1987 NCAA Division I-A football season. In their third season under head coach Art Baker, the team compiled a 5–6 record.

== Schedule ==
Date	Opponent	Site	TV	Result	Attendance	Source
September 5	at NC State	Carter–Finley Stadium; Raleigh, NC (rivalry)		W 32–14	56,800	
September 12	No. 8 Florida State	Ficklen Memorial Stadium; Greenville, NC		L 3–44	33,937	
September 19	at Illinois	Memorial Stadium; Champaign, IL		L 10–20	62,045	
September 26	Georgia Southern	Ficklen Memorial Stadium; Greenville, NC		W 16–13	27,411	
October 3	at West Virginia	Mountaineer Field; Morgantown, WV		L 0–49	36,630	
October 10	Cincinnati	Ficklen Memorial Stadium; Greenville, NC		W 56–28	26,371	
October 17	at Virginia Tech	Lane Stadium; Blacksburg, VA		W 32–23	38,300	
October 24	at South Carolina	Williams–Brice Stadium; Columbia, SC		L 12–34	69,131	
October 31	No. 3 Miami (FL)	Ficklen Memorial Stadium; Greenville, NC	WITN	L 3–41	31,791	
November 7	Temple	Ficklen Memorial Stadium; Greenville, NC		W 31–26	19,327	
November 14	at Southern Miss	M. M. Roberts Stadium; Hattiesburg, MS		L 34–38	11,023	
Rankings from AP Poll released prior to the game
