= 1987 Northern Illinois Huskies football team =

American college football season

1987 Northern Illinois Huskies football
- Conference: Independent
- Record: 5–5–1
- Head coach: Jerry Pettibone (3rd season)
- Offensive coordinator: Pat Ruel (3rd season)
- Defensive coordinator: Tim McGuire (2nd season)
- MVP: Ted Karamanos
- Captains: Ted Karamanos; Tony Savegnago
- Home stadium: Huskie Stadium

1987 NCAA Division I-A independents football records
	Conf.					Overall
Team	W		L		T	W		L		T
No. 1 Miami (FL)		–		–		12	–	0	–	0
No. 4 Syracuse		–		–		11	–	0	–	1
No. 2 Florida State		–		–		11	–	1	–	0
No. 15 South Carolina		–		–		8	–	4	–	0
Pittsburgh		–		–		8	–	4	–	0
Penn State		–		–		8	–	4	–	0
No. 17 Notre Dame		–		–		8	–	4	–	0
Southern Miss		–		–		6	–	5	–	0
Rutgers		–		–		6	–	5	–	0
Southwestern Louisiana		–		–		6	–	5	–	0
Memphis State		–		–		5	–	5	–	1
Northern Illinois		–		–		5	–	5	–	1
West Virginia		–		–		6	–	6	–	0
Tulane		–		–		6	–	6	–	0
Army		–		–		5	–	6	–	0
Boston College		–		–		5	–	6	–	0
East Carolina		–		–		5	–	6	–	0
Akron		–		–		4	–	7	–	0
Cincinnati		–		–		4	–	7	–	0
Louisville		–		–		3	–	7	–	1
Temple		–		–		3	–	8	–	0
Tulsa		–		–		3	–	8	–	0
Virginia Tech		–		–		2	–	9	–	0
Navy		–		–		2	–	9	–	0
Rankings from AP Poll

The 1987 Northern Illinois Huskies football team represented Northern Illinois University as an independent during the 1986 NCAA Division I-A football season. Led by third-year head coach Jerry Pettibone, the Huskies compiled a record of 5–5–1. Northern Illinois played home games at Huskie Stadium in DeKalb, Illinois.

== Schedule ==
Date	Time	Opponent	Site	TV	Result	Attendance	Source
September 12	6:30 pm	Lamar	Huskie Stadium; DeKalb, IL		L 35–39	22,184	
September 19	12:00 pm	at Western Michigan	Waldo Stadium; Kalamazoo, MI		W 34–14	12,005	
September 26	1:00 pm	at Northwestern	Dyche Stadium; Evanston, IL		T 16–16	27,336	
October 3	3:00 pm	at Eastern Michigan	Rynearson Stadium; Ypsilanti, MI		L 31–32	13,306	
October 10	1:00 pm	Toledo^{†}	Huskie Stadium; DeKalb, IL		W 41–5	20,939	
October 17	1:00 pm	Southwest Missouri State	Huskie Stadium; DeKalb, IL		W 27–21	9,017	
October 24	1:00 pm	Cal State Fullerton	Huskie Stadium; DeKalb, IL		L 20–21	7,325	
October 31	1:00 pm	at Ball State	Ball State Stadium; Muncie, IN (rivalry)		L 17–42	4,675	
November 7	1:00 pm	Western Illinois	Huskie Stadium; DeKalb, IL		W 29–14	21,863	
November 14	1:00 pm	Akron	Huskie Stadium; DeKalb, IL		L 21–27	5,405	
November 28	10:00 pm	at UNLV*	Sam Boyd Silver Bowl; Whitney, NV	ESPN	W 34–31	14,650	
*Non-conference game; ^{†}Homecoming; All times are in Central time
