= 1987 Tulane Green Wave football team =

American college football season

1987 Tulane Green Wave football

Independence Bowl, L 12–24 vs. Washington
- Conference: Independent
- Record: 6–6
- Head coach: Mack Brown (3rd season)
- Offensive coordinator: Darrell Moody (3rd season)
- Home stadium: Louisiana Superdome

1987 NCAA Division I-A independents football records
	Conf.					Overall
Team	W		L		T	W		L		T
No. 1 Miami (FL)		–		–		12	–	0	–	0
No. 4 Syracuse		–		–		11	–	0	–	1
No. 2 Florida State		–		–		11	–	1	–	0
No. 15 South Carolina		–		–		8	–	4	–	0
Pittsburgh		–		–		8	–	4	–	0
Penn State		–		–		8	–	4	–	0
No. 17 Notre Dame		–		–		8	–	4	–	0
Southern Miss		–		–		6	–	5	–	0
Rutgers		–		–		6	–	5	–	0
Southwestern Louisiana		–		–		6	–	5	–	0
Memphis State		–		–		5	–	5	–	1
Northern Illinois		–		–		5	–	5	–	1
West Virginia		–		–		6	–	6	–	0
Tulane		–		–		6	–	6	–	0
Army		–		–		5	–	6	–	0
Boston College		–		–		5	–	6	–	0
East Carolina		–		–		5	–	6	–	0
Akron		–		–		4	–	7	–	0
Cincinnati		–		–		4	–	7	–	0
Louisville		–		–		3	–	7	–	1
Temple		–		–		3	–	8	–	0
Tulsa		–		–		3	–	8	–	0
Virginia Tech		–		–		2	–	9	–	0
Navy		–		–		2	–	9	–	0
Rankings from AP Poll

The 1987 Tulane Green Wave football team was an American football team that represented Tulane University during the 1987 NCAA Division I-A football season as an independent. In their third year under head coach Mack Brown, the team compiled a 6–6 record and lost to Washington at the Independence Bowl.

== Schedule ==
Date	Opponent	Site	Result	Attendance	Source
September 5	at Louisville	Cardinal Stadium; Louisville, KY	L 40–42	32,242	
September 12	Iowa State	Louisiana Superdome; New Orleans, LA	W 25–12	27,561	
September 19	at Southern Miss	M. M. Roberts Stadium; Hattiesburg, MS (rivalry)	L 24–31	16,023	
September 26	Ole Miss	Louisiana Superdome; New Orleans, LA (rivalry)	W 31–24	40,302	
October 3	Vanderbilt	Louisiana Superdome; New Orleans, LA	W 27–17	34,878	
October 17	at Memphis State	Liberty Bowl Memorial Stadium; Memphis, TN	L 36–45	32,751	
October 24	Virginia Tech	Louisiana Superdome; New Orleans, LA	W 57–38	31,280	
October 31	at No. 4 Florida State	Doak Campbell Stadium; Tallahassee, FL	L 14–73	53,210	
November 7	at Mississippi State	Davis Wade Stadium; Starkville, MS	W 30–19	23,647	
November 14	Southwestern Louisiana	Louisiana Superdome; New Orleans, LA	W 38–10	31,253	
November 21	No. 9 LSU	Louisiana Superdome; New Orleans, LA (Battle for the Rag)	L 36–41	70,168	
December 19	vs. Washington	Independence Stadium; Shreveport, LA (Independence Bowl)	L 12–24	41,683	
Rankings from AP Poll released prior to the game

== Roster ==
1987 Tulane Green Wave football team roster
Players
Coaches
Offense

Pos.	#	Name	Class
RB	34	Marvin Allen	Sr
RB		Garret Chachere	Fr
QB	10	Terrence Jones	Jr
WR	21	Maurice Nelson	Jr
WR	11	Marc Zeno	Sr

Defense

Pos.	#	Name	Class
LB	95	Richard Harvey	Jr
DB		Mitchell Price	So

Special teams

Pos.	#	Name	Class

Head coach

- Mack Brown

Coordinators/assistant coaches

Legend

- (C) Team captain
- (S) Suspended
- (I) Ineligible
- Injured
- Redshirt
