= 1987 Independence Bowl =

- Independence Bowl XII
Washington Huskies	Tulane Green Wave
(6–4–1)	(6–5)
Pac-10	Independent
24	12
Head coach: Don James	Head coach: Mack Brown
	1	2	3	4	Total
Washington	7	14	0	3	24
Tulane	0	10	0	2	12
- Date: December 19, 1987
- Season: 1987
- Stadium: Independence Stadium
- Location: Shreveport, Louisiana
- MVP: QB Chris Chandler; LB David Rill
- Favorite: Washington by 6 points
- Referee: Mack Gentry (SEC)
- Attendance: 44,683

United States TV coverage
- Network: Mizlou
- Announcers: Steve Grad; Bob Casciola; Keith Shipman

The 1987 Independence Bowl was a college football postseason bowl game played on December 19, 1987, in Shreveport, Louisiana. It matched the Tulane Green Wave and the Washington Huskies of the Pacific-10 Conference. This was their first meeting and the first Independence Bowl for either team.

== Team ==
=== Tulane ===
In Mack Brown's final year as head coach, the Green Wave made their first bowl game in seven years.

=== Washington ===
In their thirteenth season under head coach Don James, the Huskies tied for third in the Pac-10. This was their tenth bowl game under James and ninth consecutive.

== Game summary ==
=== First quarter ===
- Washington: Tony Covington 3 run (Brownlee kick)

=== Second quarter ===
- Tulane: Mitchell Price 44 punt return (Wiggins kick)
- Tulane: John Koth 21 field goal
- Washington: Bill Ames 5 pass from Chris Chandler (Brownlee kick)
- Washington: Darryl Franklin 5 pass from Chandler (Wiggins kick)

=== Third quarter ===
- no scoring

=== Fourth quarter ===
- Washington: Channing Wyles 41 field goal
- Tulane: Safety, quarterback Conklin kneeled in end zone

== Aftermath ==
Brown left after this game for North Carolina; Tulane's next bowl appearance was in 1998 the Liberty Bowl, where they capped off a perfect 12–0 season with a 41–27 win over BYU. In 1989, Washington beat Florida 34–7 in the Freedom Bowl, limiting Emmitt Smith to just 17 yards rushing.

== Statistics ==
Statistics	Tulane	Washington
First downs	21	22
Rushing yards	131	147
Passing yards	248	249
Interceptions	1	3
Total yards	379	396
Fumbles–lost	2–1	1–0
Penalties–yards	7–73	10–67
Punts–average	6–43.7	4–32.8
