= 1987 Army Cadets football team =

American college football season

1987 Army Cadets football
- Conference: Independent
- Record: 5–6
- Head coach: Jim Young (5th season)
- Offensive scheme: Triple option
- Defensive coordinator: Bob Sutton (5th season)
- Base defense: 4–3
- Captains: Dave Berdan; Tory Crawford
- Home stadium: Michie Stadium

1987 NCAA Division I-A independents football records
	Conf.					Overall
Team	W		L		T	W		L		T
No. 1 Miami (FL)		–		–		12	–	0	–	0
No. 4 Syracuse		–		–		11	–	0	–	1
No. 2 Florida State		–		–		11	–	1	–	0
No. 15 South Carolina		–		–		8	–	4	–	0
Pittsburgh		–		–		8	–	4	–	0
Penn State		–		–		8	–	4	–	0
No. 17 Notre Dame		–		–		8	–	4	–	0
Southern Miss		–		–		6	–	5	–	0
Rutgers		–		–		6	–	5	–	0
Southwestern Louisiana		–		–		6	–	5	–	0
Memphis State		–		–		5	–	5	–	1
Northern Illinois		–		–		5	–	5	–	1
West Virginia		–		–		6	–	6	–	0
Tulane		–		–		6	–	6	–	0
Army		–		–		5	–	6	–	0
Boston College		–		–		5	–	6	–	0
East Carolina		–		–		5	–	6	–	0
Akron		–		–		4	–	7	–	0
Cincinnati		–		–		4	–	7	–	0
Louisville		–		–		3	–	7	–	1
Temple		–		–		3	–	8	–	0
Tulsa		–		–		3	–	8	–	0
Virginia Tech		–		–		2	–	9	–	0
Navy		–		–		2	–	9	–	0
Rankings from AP Poll

The 1987 Army Cadets football team was an American football team that represented the United States Military Academy as an independent during the 1987 NCAA Division I-A football season. In their fifth season under head coach Jim Young, the Cadets compiled a 5–6 record and outscored their opponents by a combined total of 277 to 223. In the annual Army–Navy Game, the Cadets defeated Navy, 17–3.

== Schedule ==
Date	Time	Opponent	Site	Result	Attendance	Source
September 12		No. 4 Holy Cross	Michie Stadium; West Point, NY	L 24–34	38,428	
September 19		at Kansas State	KSU Stadium; Manhattan, KS	W 41–14	27,500	
September 26		The Citadel	Michie Stadium; West Point, NY	W 48–6	37,548	
October 3		Wake Forest	Michie Stadium; West Point, NY	L 13–17	36,690	
October 10		at Boston College	Alumni Stadium; Chestnut Hill, MA	L 24–29	31,500	
October 17		Colgate	Michie Stadium; West Point, NY	L 20–22	40,578	
October 24		Rutgers	Michie Stadium; West Point, NY	L 14–27	40,711	
October 31		Temple	Michie Stadium; West Point, NY	W 17–7	32,053	
November 7		at Air Force	Falcon Stadium; Colorado Springs, CO (Commander-in-Chief's Trophy)	L 10–27	49,183	
November 14		Lafayette	Michie Stadium; West Point, NY	W 49–37	37,195	
December 5	2:00 p.m.	vs. Navy	Veterans Stadium; Philadelphia, PA (Army–Navy Game)	W 17–3	68,000	
Rankings from NCAA Division I-AA Football Committee Poll released prior to the game; All times are in Eastern time

== Game summaries ==
=== At Kansas State ===
The Cadets rushed out to a 17–0 halftime lead by quarterback Tory Crawford who ran for 128 yards and three touchdowns in the contest.

External videos
- Game highlights

=== Temple ===
Temple Owls at Army Cadets

Quarter	1	2	3	4	Total
Temple	0	7	0	0	7
Army	0	7	10	0	17

at Michie Stadium • West Point, New York

- Date: October 31
- Game attendance: 32,053

Game information
- ARMY - Barnett 1 yard run (Rambusch kick)
- TEMP - Quinn 2 yard run (Wright kick)
- ARMY - Charette 64 yard pass from Leone (Rambusch kick)
- ARMY - Rambusch 39 yard field goal

Temple

- Baker 4/6, 37 Yds
- Quinn 29 Rush, 144 Yds, TD
- Garczynski 1 Rec, 26 Yds

Army

- Leone 1/1, 64 Yds, TD
- Barnett 26 Rush, 114 Yds, TD
- Charette 1 Rec, 64 Yds, TD

External videos
- Game highlights

=== At Air Force ===
Army Cadets (3–5) at Air Force Falcons (6–3)

Quarter	1	2	3	4	Total
Army	0	3	7	0	10
Air Force	7	7	7	6	27

at Falcon Stadium, Colorado Springs, Colorado

- Date: November 7, 1987
- Game attendance: 49,183

Team	Category	Player	Statistics
Army	Passing		
Army	Rushing		
Army	Receiving		
Air Force	Passing		
Air Force	Rushing	Dee Dowis	129 Yds, TD
Air Force	Receiving		

Scoring summary

Quarter	Time	Drive			Team	Scoring information	Score	
Quarter	Time	Plays	Yards	TOP	Team	Scoring information	ARMY	AFA
1		10	86		Air Force	Anthony Roberson 1-yard touchdown run, kick good	0	7
2	7:02				Army	32-yard field goal by Bit Rambusch	3	7
2	0:30	16	83		Air Force	Dee Dowis 3-yard touchdown run, kick good	3	14
3	7:25				Army	Mike Mayweather 46-yard touchdown reception from Tory Crawford, kick good	10	14
3	3:59				Air Force	Albert Booker 1-yard touchdown run, kick good	10	21
4					Air Force	Interception return 24 yards for touchdown by Kevin Hughes	10	27
"TOP" = time of possession. For other American football terms, see Glossary of American football.							10	27

=== vs Navy ===
Army Cadets (4–6) vs. Navy Midshipmen (2–8)

Quarter	1	2	3	4	Total
Navy	0	0	0	3	3
Army	3	0	0	14	17

at Veterans Stadium • Philadelphia, Pennsylvania

- Date: December 5
- Game time: 2:00 p.m. EDT
- Game attendance: 68,000

Game information

Navy

- Alton Grizzard
  3/5, 59 Yds
  17 Rush, 53 Yds
- Don Hughes
  2 Rec, 49 Yds

Army

- Tory Crawford
  2/4, 22 Yds
- Mike Mayweather
  25 Rush, 119 Yds
- Andy Peterson
  1 Rec, 11 Yds
- Ben Barnett
  1 Rec, 11 Yds

Scoring summary

Quarter	Time	Drive			Team	Scoring information	Score	
Quarter	Time	Plays	Yards	TOP	Team	Scoring information	NAVY	ARMY
1					Army	40-yard field goal by Bit Rambusch	0	3
4					Army	Andy Peterson 1-yard touchdown run, Bit Rambusch kick good	0	10
4	5:01				Navy	30-yard field goal by Ted Fundoukas	3	10
4					Army	Tory Crawford 7-yard touchdown run, Bit Rambusch kick good	3	17
"TOP" = time of possession. For other American football terms, see Glossary of American football.							3	17

External videos
- Game highlights

== Roster ==
1987 Army Cadets football team roster
Players
Coaches
Offense

Pos.	#	Name	Class
QB		Bryan Babb
RB		Ben Barnett
RB		John Barth
RB		Paul Capriotti
RB		Calvin Cass	Fr
TE		Mark Charette
TE		Tim Clouser
QB	9	Tory Crawford	Sr
RB		Garth Estadt
OL		Ken Goodlow
RB		Ron Herring
WR		Sean Jordan
RB		Bill Kim
QB		Otto Leone
RB	30	Mike Mayweather
QB		Bryan McWilliams
QB		Mark Mooney
RB	47	Andy Peterson
WR		Mark Phillips
OL		Bill Ratliff
OL		Craig Raymond
QB		Morrell Savoy
OL		Bill Schleiden
OL		Mike Karsonovich

Defense

Pos.	#	Name	Class
DB		Dave Berdan
DB		Earnest Boyd
DB		Chance Conner
DL		Dan Cooney
LB		Greg Gadson
LB		George Godfrey
LB		Ray Griffiths
DL		Josh Haines
LB	45	Troy Lingley
DL		Tom Mathers
DL		John Oleinik
DB	18	Edrico Oliver
DB		Yale Peebles
LB	55	Chuck Schretzman
DB		Chuck Williams

Special teams

Pos.	#	Name	Class
K, P	1	Bit Rambusch
K		Keith Walker

Head coach

- Jim Young

Coordinators/assistant coaches

Legend

- (C) Team captain
- (S) Suspended
- (I) Ineligible
- Injured
- Redshirt
