= Donnie Dee =

American football player (born 1965)

No. 48, 81
- Position: Tight end

Personal information
- Born: March 17, 1965 (age 61); Kansas City, Missouri, U.S.
- Listed height: 6 ft 4 in (1.93 m)
- Listed weight: 247 lb (112 kg)

Career information
- High school: Kansas City (MO) Oak Park
- College: Tulsa
- NFL draft: 1988: 11th round, 297th overall pick

Career history
- Indianapolis Colts (1988–1989); Seattle Seahawks (1989); Green Bay Packers (1990)*
- * Offseason or practice squad member only
- Stats at Pro Football Reference

Donnie Dee (born March 17, 1965) is an American former professional football tight end. He played for the Indianapolis Colts from 1988 to 1989 and for the Seattle Seahawks in 1989. He was selected by the Colts in the 11th round of the 1988 NFL draft.
