= Ted Gregory =

American football player (born 1965)

No. 74
- Position: Defensive tackle

Personal information
- Born: February 11, 1965 (age 61); Queens, New York, U.S.
- Listed height: 6 ft 1 in (1.85 m)
- Listed weight: 260 lb (118 kg)

Career information
- High school: East Islip (Islip Terrace, New York)
- College: Syracuse
- NFL draft: 1988: 1st round, 26th overall pick

Career history
- Denver Broncos (1988)*; New Orleans Saints (1988)
- * Offseason or practice squad member only

Awards and highlights
- Consensus All-American (1987); First-team All-East (1987); Second-team All-East (1985)

Career NFL statistics
- Sacks: 1
- Stats at Pro Football Reference

Theodore Anthony Gregory (born February 11, 1965) is an American former professional football player who was a defensive tackle for one season with the New Orleans Saints of the National Football League (NFL). He played college football for the Syracuse Orangemen, earning consensus All-American honors in 1987. Gregory was selected in the first round of the 1988 NFL draft by the Denver Broncos. He listed his height as 6'1". However, a shocked Dan Reeves, who is also listed as 6'1" commented, "I'm taller than he is!" upon meeting Gregory after the draft. By Reeves's estimate, Gregory was closer to 5'9".

Gregory had injured his knee in his last collegiate game, and the knee gave out during training camp. Following scathing criticism from the press for wasting a pick on damaged goods, the Broncos traded him to the Saints for Shawn Knight before the season. He is now regarded as one of the biggest draft busts in Broncos' history. After the Gregory incident the Broncos began meeting with potential draft picks prior to the draft, a practice they had not previously engaged in.

Gregory blew out his knee in his third game with the Saints, and never played in the NFL again. After a series of failed business ventures drained his life savings, he took a job as a construction worker, only to have that end due to a ruptured disc in his back that temporarily rendered him a paraplegic. Gregory placed 8th in Deadspin's "The 100 Worst NFL Players of All Time".
