= Ray Roundtree =

American football player (born 1966)

No. 86
- Position: Wide receiver

Personal information
- Born: April 19, 1966 (age 60); Aiken, South Carolina, U.S.
- Listed height: 6 ft 0 in (1.83 m)
- Listed weight: 180 lb (82 kg)

Career information
- High school: South Aiken
- College: Penn State
- NFL draft: 1988: 3rd round, 58th overall pick

Career history
- Detroit Lions (1988); Pittsburgh Steelers (1990)*
- * Offseason or practice squad member only

Awards and highlights
- National champion (1986)
- Stats at Pro Football Reference

Raymond Anthony Roundtree (born April 19, 1966) is an American former professional football player who was a wide receiver in the National Football League (NFL) played for the Detroit Lions. He played college football at Penn State University. He was selected by the Lions in the third round of the 1988 NFL draft.
