= 1987 Michigan State Spartans football team =

American college football season

1987 Michigan State Spartans football

Big Ten champion Rose Bowl champion

Rose Bowl, W 20–17 vs. USC
- Conference: Big Ten Conference

Ranking
- Coaches: No. 8
- AP: No. 8
- Record: 9–2–1 (7–0–1 Big Ten)
- Head coach: George Perles (5th season)
- Offensive coordinator: Morris Watts (2nd season)
- Defensive coordinator: Nick Saban (5th season)
- Base defense: Stunt 4–3
- MVP: Lorenzo White
- Captains: Mark Nichols; Pat Shurmur; Rob Stradley; Lorenzo White
- Home stadium: Spartan Stadium

1987 Big Ten Conference football standings
	Conf.					Overall
Team	W		L		T	W		L		T
No. 8 Michigan State $	7	–	0	–	1	9	–	2	–	1
No. 16 Iowa	6	–	2	–	0	10	–	3	–	0
Indiana	6	–	2	–	0	8	–	4	–	0
No. 19 Michigan	5	–	3	–	0	8	–	4	–	0
Ohio State	4	–	4	–	0	6	–	4	–	1
Minnesota	3	–	5	–	0	6	–	5	–	0
Purdue	3	–	5	–	0	3	–	7	–	1
Illinois	2	–	5	–	1	3	–	7	–	1
Northwestern	2	–	6	–	0	2	–	8	–	1
Wisconsin	1	–	7	–	0	3	–	8	–	0
$ – Conference champion; Rankings from AP Poll

The 1987 Michigan State Spartans football team was an American football team that represented Michigan State University as a member of the Big Ten Conference during the 1987 NCAA Division I-A football season. In their fifth year under head coach George Perles, the Spartans compiled a 9–2–1 record (7–0–1 in conference games), outscored opponents by a total of 241 to 136, and won the Big Ten championship. They defeated USC in the 1988 Rose Bowl and were ranked No. 8 in the final AP and UPI polls. It was the program's first top 10 finish since 1966.

On offense, the Spartans gained an average of 218.3 rushing yards and 88.8 passing yards per game. On defense, they held opponents to an average of 56.3 rushing yards and 150.5 passing yards per game.

Running back Lorenzo White tallied 1,459 rushing yards and 14 touchdowns on 322 attempts, an average of 4.5 yards per carry. He was a consensus All-American, finished fourth in the Heisman Trophy voting, and won the Chicago Tribune Silver Football as the Big Ten's most valuable player. He was later inducted into the College Football Hall of Fame.

Other statistical leaders included quarterback Bobby McAllister (67 of 132 passing, 50.8%, for 1,042 yards), wide receiver Andre Rison (32 receptions, 694 yards, 21.7 yards per reception), and linebacker Todd Krumm (nine interceptions). Seven Michigan State players received first-team honors on the 1987 All-Big Ten Conference football team: White; Krumm; offensive tackle Tony Mandarich; center Pat Shurmur; linebacker Percy Snow; defensive back John Miller; and punter Greg Montgomery. Rison was named to the second team. Mandarich was named the Big Ten Offensive Lineman of the Year, and head coach George Perles was selected by the conference coaches as the Big Ten Coach of the Year.

The team played its home games at Spartan Stadium in East Lansing, Michigan. The Spartans played the first night game ever at the stadium on September 7, 1987.

== Schedule ==
Date	Time	Opponent	Rank	Site	TV	Result	Attendance	Source
September 7	8:00 p.m.	No. 19 USC*		Spartan Stadium; East Lansing, MI	ABC	W 27–13	77,922	
September 19	7:45 p.m.	at No. 9 Notre Dame*	No. 17	Notre Dame Stadium; Notre Dame, IN (rivalry)	ESPN	L 8–31	59,075	
September 26	1:00 p.m.	No. 6 Florida State*		Spartan Stadium; East Lansing, MI		L 3–31	76,887	
October 3	12:30 p.m.	at No. 17 Iowa		Kinnick Stadium; Iowa City, IA		W 19–14	67,700	
October 10	3:30 p.m.	No. 12 Michigan		Spartan Stadium; East Lansing, MI (rivalry)	ABC	W 17–11	77,424	
October 17	2:05 p.m.	at Northwestern	No. 19	Ryan Field; Evanston, IL		W 38–0	29,113	
October 24	1:00 p.m.	Illinois^{†}	No. 14	Spartan Stadium; East Lansing, MI		T 14–14	76,513	
October 31	3:30 p.m.	at No. 15 Ohio State	No. 20	Ohio Stadium; Columbus, OH	ABC	W 13–7	89,915	
November 7	1:00 p.m.	Purdue	No. 15	Spartan Stadium; East Lansing, MI		W 45–3	76,933	
November 14	3:30 p.m.	No. 16 Indiana	No. 13	Spartan Stadium; East Lansing, MI (rivalry)	ABC	W 27–3	76,411	
November 21	2:05 p.m.	at Wisconsin	No. 11	Camp Randall Stadium; Madison, WI		W 30–9	45,385	
January 1, 1988	5:00 p.m.	vs. No. 16 USC*	No. 8	Rose Bowl; Pasadena, CA (Rose Bowl)	NBC	W 20–17	103,847	
*Non-conference game; ^{†}Homecoming; Rankings from AP Poll released prior to the game; All times are in Eastern time

== Game summaries ==
=== At Notre Dame ===
Michigan State at Notre Dame

Team	1	2	3	4	Total
Spartans	0	0	0	8	8
• Fighting Irish	19	5	7	0	31

- Date: September 19
- Location: Notre Dame Stadium, South Bend, IN
- Game start: 7:45 p.m. EST
- Game attendance: 59,075
- Television network: ESPN

Scoring summary
Q1	ND	Ezor downed ball in end zone	ND 2–0
Q1	ND	Gradel 27 yard field goal	ND 5–0
Q1	ND	Brown 71 yard punt return (Gradel kick)	ND 12–0
Q1	ND	Brown 66 yard punt return (Gradel kick)	ND 19–0
Q2	ND	McAllister tackled in end zone	ND 21–0
Q2	ND	Gradel 37 yard field goal	ND 24–0
Q3	ND	Johnson 3 yard run (Gradel kick)	ND 31–0
Q4	MSU	Rison 57 yard pass from McAllister (Wilson pass from McAllister)	ND 31–8

=== Florida State ===
Florida State at Michigan State

Team	1	2	3	4	Total
• #6 Seminoles	0	7	10	14	31
Spartans	0	3	0	0	3

- Date: September 26
- Location: Spartan Stadium
  East Lansing, MI
- Game attendance: 76,887

=== At Iowa ===
Michigan State at Iowa

Team	1	2	3	4	Total
• Spartans	7	0	6	6	19
#17 Hawkeyes	7	7	0	0	14

- Date: October 3
- Location: Kinnick Stadium, Iowa City, IA
- Game attendance: 67,699

Scoring summary
1	IOWA	Early 19-yard pass from Dan McGwire (Houghtlin kick)	IOWA 7-0
1	Mich St	White 5-yard run (Langeloh kick)	Tied 7-7
2	Iowa	Watkins 14-yard pass from McGwire (Houghtlin kick)	IOWA 14-7
3	KSU	Langeloh 21-yard field goal	IOWA 14-10
3	KSU	Langeloh 46-yard field goal	IOWA 14-13
4	Iowa	Sargent 8-yard pass from McAllister (pass failed)	Mich St 19-14

=== Michigan ===
	1	2	3	4	Total
Michigan	3	0	0	8	11
Michigan St	7	7	0	3	17

- MICH - Gillette 31 FG
- MSU - White 6 Run (Langeloh kick)
- MSU - White 2 Run (Langeloh kick)
- MICH - Morris 18 D. Brown (pass good)
- MSU - Langeloh 42 FG
- Passing: MICH D. Brown 12/26, 158 Yds, TD, 7 INT, MSU McAllister 5/7, 68 Yds
- Rushing: MICH Morris 31/108, MSU White 34/185, 2 TD
- Receiving: MICH Kolesar 4/65, MSU Bouyer 2/38

=== At Northwestern ===
Michigan State Spartans at Northwestern Wildcats

Quarter	1	2	3	4	Total
Michigan St	10	7	14	7	38
Northwestern	0	0	0	0	0

at Dyche Stadium • Evanston, Illinois

- Date: October 17
- Game attendance: 29,113
- Gainesville Sun. 1987 Oct 18.

Game information

First quarter

- MSU – John Langeloh 31-yard field goal
- MSU – Lorenzo White 1-yard run (John Langeloh kick)

Second quarter

- MSU – Lorenzo White 6-yard run (John Langeloh kick)

Third quarter

- MSU – Lorenzo White 1-yard run (John Langeloh kick)
- MSU – Andre Rison 7-yard pass from Bobby McAllister (John Langeloh kick)

Fourth quarter

- MSU – Blake Ezor 13-yard run (John Langeloh kick)

Top passers

- MSU – Bobby McAllister – 5/16, 97 yards, TD, INT
- NW – Mike Greenfield – 4/9, 50 yards, INT

Top rushers

- MSU – Lorenzo White – 33 rushes, 187 yards, 3 TD
- NW – Byron Sanders – 20 rushes, 26 yards

Top receivers

- MSU – Andre Rison – 5 receptions, 96 yards, TD
- NW – Marcus Lang – 1 reception, 26 yards

=== At Ohio State ===
Michigan State Spartans at Ohio State Buckeyes

Quarter	1	2	3	4	Total
Michigan St	10	3	0	0	13
Ohio St	7	0	0	0	7

at Ohio Stadium, Columbus, Ohio

- Date: October 31, 1987
- Game time: 3:30 p.m.
- Game weather: Sunny, 60 °F (16 °C)
- Game attendance: 89,915
- Referee: Ron Winter
- TV: ABC
- Box Score

Game information

First quarter

- OSU – Everett Ross 79-yard pass from Tom Tupa (Matt Frantz kick), 14:45. 'Ohio St 7–0. Drive: 1 play, 79 yards, 0:11.
- MSU – Bobby McAllister 15-yard run (John Langeloh kick), 4:37. Tie 7–7. Drive: 3 plays, 54 yards, 0:50.
- MSU – John Langeloh 40-yard field goal, 1:22. Michigan St 10–7. Drive: 4 plays, 13 yards, 1:48.

Second quarter

- MSU – John Langeloh 20-yard field goal, 10:41. Michigan St 13–7. Drive: 9 plays, 41 yards, 4:10.

Top passers

- MSU – Bobby McAllister – 4/12, 61 yards
- OSU – Tom Tupa – 8/15, 137 yards, TD, 2 INT

Top rushers

- MSU – Bobby McAllister – 22 rushes, 83 yards, TD
- OSU – Carlos Snow – 8 rushes, 18 yards

Top receivers

- MSU – Lorenzo White – 2 receptions, 21 yards
- OSU – Alex Higdon – 6 receptions, 54 yards

=== Indiana ===
Indiana Hoosiers at Michigan State Spartans

Quarter	1	2	3	4	Total
Indiana	3	0	0	0	3
Michigan St	0	17	10	0	27

at Spartan Stadium • East Lansing, Michigan

- Date: November 14
- Game attendance: 76,411

Game information

Indiana

- Kramme
  11/26, 147 Yds, 3 INT
- Thompson
  10 Rush, 23 Yds
- Jordan
  3 Rec, 39 Yds

Michigan St

- McAllister
  5/5, 67 Yds, TD
- White
  56 Rush, 292 Yds, 2 TD
- Rison
  2 Rec, 41 Yds, TD

Scoring summary

Quarter	Time	Drive			Team	Scoring information	Score	
Quarter	Time	Plays	Yards	TOP	Team	Scoring information	IND	MSU
1					Indiana	49-yard field goal by Stoyanovich	3	0
2					Michigan St	White 5-yard touchdown run, Langeloh kick good	3	7
2					Michigan St	Rison 22-yard touchdown reception from McAllister, Langeloh kick good	3	14
2					Michigan St	47-yard field goal by Langeloh	3	17
3					Michigan St	21-yard field goal by Langeloh	3	20
3					Michigan St	White 1-yard touchdown run, Langeloh kick good	3	27
"TOP" = time of possession. For other American football terms, see Glossary of American football.							3	27

== Personnel ==
1987 Michigan State Spartans football team roster
Players
Coaches
Offense

Pos.	#	Name	Class
WR	17	Willie Bouyer	Jr
QB	4	Dan Enos	Fr
RB	26	Blake Ezor	So
TE		Rich Gicewicz
OL		David Houle
WR	14	Jeff Jacobs	Sr
OL	63	Bob Kula
OT	79	Tony Mandarich	Jr
QB	8	Bobby McAllister	Jr
RB		Steve Montgomery
RB		James Moore
RB		Joe Pugh
WR	1	Andre Rison	Jr
OT	71	Kevin Robbins	Jr
TE	49	Mike Sargent	Sr
C	60	Pat Shurmur	Sr
OL	61	Vince Tata	Jr
RB	34	Lorenzo White	Sr
WR		Bernard Wilson
FB	29	Duane Young	Fr

Defense

Pos.	#	Name	Class
CB	36	Harlon Barnett	So
DL		Joe Bergin
DL		John Budde
DL	75	Travis Davis
LB	57	Dixon Edwards	Fr
DB	9	Mike Iaquaniello	Fr
LB	51	Carlos Jenkins	Fr
S	35	Todd Krumm	Sr
LB	3	Kurt Larson	Jr
S	44	John Miller	Jr
LB		Tim Moore
DT	77	Eric Moten	Fr
DL	83	Mark Nichols
DB		Lenier Payton
DB		Derrick Reed
LB	48	Percy Snow	So
DL		Chris Soehnien
DE	91	Jim Szymanski	So
LB	66	Matt Vanderbeck	So

Special teams

Pos.	#	Name	Class
PK	10	John Langeloh	Fr
P	23	Greg Montgomery	Sr

Head coach

- George Perles

Coordinators/assistant coaches

- Nick Saban

Legend

- (C) Team captain
- (S) Suspended
- (I) Ineligible
- Injured
- Redshirt

== 1988 NFL draft ==
The following players were selected in the 1988 NFL draft. Team members Tony Mandarich, Andre Rison and Percy Snow were drafted in later years.

Player	Round	Pick	Position	NFL team
Lorenzo White	1	22	Running back	Houston Oilers
Greg Montgomery	3	72	Punter	Houston Oilers
David Houle	6	145	Guard	New York Giants
Tim Moore	8	206	Linebacker	Phoenix Cardinals
Mark Nichols	8	209	Nose Tackle	Pittsburgh Steelers
