= 1987 Ohio State Buckeyes football team =

American college football season

1987 Ohio State Buckeyes football
- Conference: Big Ten Conference
- Record: 6–4–1 (4–4 Big Ten)
- Head coach: Earle Bruce (9th season)
- Defensive coordinator: Gary Blackney (3rd season)
- MVP: Chris Spielman
- Captains: Chris Spielman; William White; Vince Workman
- Home stadium: Ohio Stadium

1987 Big Ten Conference football standings
	Conf.					Overall
Team	W		L		T	W		L		T
No. 8 Michigan State $	7	–	0	–	1	9	–	2	–	1
No. 16 Iowa	6	–	2	–	0	10	–	3	–	0
Indiana	6	–	2	–	0	8	–	4	–	0
No. 19 Michigan	5	–	3	–	0	8	–	4	–	0
Ohio State	4	–	4	–	0	6	–	4	–	1
Minnesota	3	–	5	–	0	6	–	5	–	0
Purdue	3	–	5	–	0	3	–	7	–	1
Illinois	2	–	5	–	1	3	–	7	–	1
Northwestern	2	–	6	–	0	2	–	8	–	1
Wisconsin	1	–	7	–	0	3	–	8	–	0
$ – Conference champion; Rankings from AP Poll

The 1987 Ohio State Buckeyes football team was an American football team that represented the Ohio State University as a member of the Big Ten Conference during the 1987 NCAA Division I-A football season. In their ninth and final year under head coach Earle Bruce, the Buckeyes compiled a 6–4–1 record (4–4 in conference games), finished in fifth place in the Big Ten, and outscored opponents by a total of 224 to 181. They did not appear in a bowl game for the first time since 1971 and were unranked in the final AP poll.

The Buckeyes gained an average of 151.6 rushing yards and 174.2 passing yards per game. On defense, they held opponents to 144.4 rushing yards and 171.1 passing yards per game. The team's statistical leaders included quarterback Tom Tupa (1,786 passing yards, 55.4% completion percentage), running back Vince Workman (470 rushing yards, 4.0 yards per carry), and wide receiver Everett Ross (29 receptions for 585 yards). Tupa (as punter) and linebacker Chris Spielman were consensus first-team All-Americans. Four Ohio State players received first-team honors on the 1987 All-Big Ten Conference football team: Spielman (AP/UPI); linebacker/defensive end Eric Kumerow; defensive back William White (AP/UPI); and Tupa as punter (AP).

The team played its home games at Ohio Stadium in Columbus, Ohio.

== Schedule ==
Date	Time	Opponent	Rank	Site	TV	Result	Attendance	Source
September 12	12:30 p.m.	West Virginia*	No. 5	Ohio Stadium; Columbus, OH	RCM	W 24–3	88,272	
September 19	1:30 p.m.	Oregon*	No. 5	Ohio Stadium; Columbus, OH		W 24–14	89,882	
September 26	1:30 p.m.	at No. 4 LSU*	No. 7	Tiger Stadium; Baton Rouge, LA	CBS	T 13–13	79,263	
October 3	3:30 p.m.	at Illinois	No. 9	Memorial Stadium; Champaign, IL (Illibuck)	ABC	W 10–6	73,045	
October 10	1:30 p.m.	Indiana	No. 9	Ohio Stadium; Columbus, OH		L 10–31	90,032	
October 17	3:30 p.m.	at Purdue	No. 17	Ross–Ade Stadium; West Lafayette, IN	RCM	W 20–17	66,501	
October 24	3:30 p.m.	Minnesota	No. 16	Ohio Stadium; Columbus, OH	RCM	W 42–9	89,801	
October 31	3:30 p.m.	No. 20 Michigan State	No. 15	Ohio Stadium; Columbus, OH	ABC	L 7–13	89,915	
November 7	2:00 p.m.	at Wisconsin		Camp Randall Stadium; Madison, WI		L 24–26	63,195	
November 14	1:30 p.m.	Iowa		Ohio Stadium; Columbus, OH		L 27–29	90,090	
November 21	12:00 p.m.	at Michigan		Michigan Stadium; Ann Arbor, MI (rivalry)	ABC	W 23–20	106,031	
*Non-conference game; Rankings from AP Poll released prior to the game; All times are in Eastern time

== Game summaries ==
=== West Virginia ===
Team	1	2	3	4	Total
West Virginia	0	0	3	0	3
• Ohio St	17	0	0	7	24

- Date: September 12
- Location: Ohio Stadium, Columbus, OH
- Game attendance: 88,272

Scoring summary
Q1	OHST	Frantz 47 yard field goal	OHST 3–0
Q1	OHST	Bryant 7 yard run (Frantz kick)	OHST 10–0
Q1	OHST	Ross 23 yard pass from Tupa (Frantz kick)	OHST 17–0
Q3	WVU	Baumann 27 yard field goal	OHST 17–3
Q4	OHST	White 29 yard interception return (Frantz kick)	OHST 24–3

=== Oregon ===
Oregon Ducks at Ohio State Buckeyes

Quarter	1	2	3	4	Total
Oregon	0	0	0	14	14
Ohio St	0	3	14	7	24

at Ohio Stadium, Columbus, Ohio

- Date: September 19, 1987
- Game time: 1:30 p.m.
- Game weather: Sunny, 74 °F (23 °C)
- Game attendance: 89,882
- Referee: Jerry Hendrickson

Game information

Second quarter

- OSU – Matt Frantz 34-yard field goal, 8:01. Ohio St 3–0. Drive: 11 plays, 47 yards, 4:04.

Third quarter

- OSU – Jay Koch 4-yard pass from Tom Tupa (Matt Frantz kick), 4:29. Ohio St 10–0. Drive: 14 plays, 88 yards, 6:23.
- OSU – George Cooper 19-yard pass from Tom Tupa (Matt Frantz kick), 3:15. Ohio St 17–0. Drive: 1 play, 19 yards, 0:09.

'Fourth quarter

- ORE – Joe Meerten 8-yard pass from Bill Musgrave (Kirk Dennis kick), 6:40. Ohio St 17–7. Drive: 2 plays, 8 yards, 0:13.
- OSU – Vince Workman 5-yard run (Matt Frantz kick), 3:17. Ohio St 24–7. Drive: 8 plays, 80 yards, 3:23.
- ORE – Rod Green 7-yard pass from Bill Musgrave (Kirk Dennis kick), 1:47. Ohio St 24–14. Drive: 7 plays, 77 yards, 1:23.

Top passers

- ORE – Bill Musgrave – 18/27, 205 yards, 2 TD
- OSU – Tom Tupa – 20/32, 234 yards, 2 TD

Top rushers

- ORE – Latin Berry – 18 rushes, 33 yards
- OSU – Vince Workman – 27 rushes, 162 yards, TD

Top receivers

- ORE – Terry Obee – 4 receptions, 63 yards
- OSU – Vince Workman – 5 receptions, 63 yards

=== LSU ===
Team	1	2	3	4	Total
Ohio St	3	0	3	7	13
LSU	7	3	0	3	13

- Date: September 26
- Location: Tiger Stadium

=== Illinois ===
Team	1	2	3	4	Total
• Ohio St	7	3	0	0	10
Illinois	0	0	0	6	6

- Date: October 3
- Location: Memorial Stadium

=== Indiana ===
Team	1	2	3	4	Total
• Indiana	7	3	7	14	31
Ohio St	0	10	0	0	10

- Date: October 10
- Location: Ohio Stadium

=== At Purdue ===
#17 Ohio State Buckeyes (3–1–1) at Purdue Boilermakers (1–3–1)

Quarter	1	2	3	4	Total
Ohio St	7	10	0	3	20
Purdue	0	0	10	7	17

at Ross–Ade Stadium, West Lafayette, Indiana

- Date: October 17, 1987
- Game time: 3:30 p.m. EDT
- Game weather: Overcast, 53 °F (12 °C)
- Game attendance: 66,501
- Referee: John Nealon
- TV: Raycom

Team	Category	Player	Statistics
Ohio St	Passing	Tom Tupa	8/16, 174 Yds, TD
Ohio St	Rushing	James Bryant	23 Rush, 77 Yds
Ohio St	Receiving	Vince Workman	4 Rec, 88 Yds, TD
Purdue	Passing	Doug Downing	20/26, 218 Yds, 2 TD, INT
Purdue	Rushing	James Medlock	17 Rush, 44 Yds
Purdue	Receiving	Calvin Williams	8 Rec, 107 Yds, 2 TD

Scoring summary

Quarter	Time	Drive			Team	Scoring information	Score	
Quarter	Time	Plays	Yards	TOP	Team	Scoring information	OSU	PU
1	5:30	9	66	4:10	Ohio St	Vince Workman 36-yard touchdown reception from Tom Tupa, Matt Frantz kick good	7	0
2	4:45	2	9	0:42	Ohio St	Tom Tupa 6-yard touchdown run, Matt Frantz kick good	14	0
2	0:22	8	47	1:25	Ohio St	18-yard field goal by Matt Frantz	17	0
3	6:33	13	65	6:44	Purdue	25-yard field goal by Jonathan Briggs	17	3
3	1:00	7	74	1:32	Purdue	Calvin Williams 10-yard touchdown reception from Doug Downing, Jonathan Briggs kick good	17	10
4	13:09	3	38	0:57	Purdue	Calvin Williams 30-yard touchdown reception from Doug Downing, Jonathan Briggs kick good	17	17
4	3:10	6	35	3:13	Ohio St	50-yard field goal by Matt Frantz	20	17
"TOP" = time of possession. For other American football terms, see Glossary of American football.							20	17

=== Minnesota ===
Team	1	2	3	4	Total
Minnesota	0	9	0	0	9
• Ohio St	7	7	14	14	42

- Date: October 24
- Location: Ohio Stadium

=== Michigan State ===
Michigan State Spartans at Ohio State Buckeyes

Quarter	1	2	3	4	Total
Michigan St	10	3	0	0	13
Ohio St	7	0	0	0	7

at Ohio Stadium, Columbus, Ohio

- Date: October 31, 1987
- Game time: 3:30 p.m.
- Game weather: Sunny, 60 °F (16 °C)
- Game attendance: 89,915
- Referee: Ron Winter
- TV: ABC

Game information

First quarter

- OSU – Everett Ross 79-yard pass from Tom Tupa (Matt Frantz kick), 14:45. 'Ohio St 7–0. Drive: 1 play, 79 yards, 0:11.
- MSU – Bobby McAllister 15-yard run (John Langeloh kick), 4:37. Tie 7–7. Drive: 3 plays, 54 yards, 0:50.
- MSU – John Langeloh 40-yard field goal, 1:22. Michigan St 10–7. Drive: 4 plays, 13 yards, 1:48.

Second quarter

- MSU – John Langeloh 20-yard field goal, 10:41. Michigan St 13–7. Drive: 9 plays, 41 yards, 4:10.

Top passers

- MSU – Bobby McAllister – 4/12, 61 yards
- OSU – Tom Tupa – 8/15, 137 yards, TD, 2 INT

Top rushers

- MSU – Bobby McAllister – 22 rushes, 83 yards, TD
- OSU – Carlos Snow – 8 rushes, 18 yards

Top receivers

- MSU – Lorenzo White – 2 receptions, 21 yards
- OSU – Alex Higdon – 6 receptions, 54 yards

=== Wisconsin ===
Team	1	2	3	4	Total
Ohio St	14	10	0	0	24
• Wisconsin	7	6	10	3	26

- Date: November 7
- Location: Camp Randall Stadium

=== Iowa ===
Team	1	2	3	4	Total
• Iowa	3	12	0	14	29
Ohio St	7	7	7	6	27

- Date: November 14
- Location: Ohio Stadium

=== Michigan ===
Ohio State Buckeyes (5–4–1) at Michigan Wolverines

Quarter	1	2	3	4	Total
Ohio St	0	7	13	3	23
Michigan	7	6	7	0	20

at Michigan Stadium, Ann Arbor, Michigan

- Date: November 21, 1987
- Game time: 12:00 p.m.
- Game weather: Cloudy, low 30s
- Game attendance: 106,031
- TV: ABC

Game information

First quarter

- MICH – Jamie Morris 1-yard run (Mike Gillette kick), 10:02. Michigan 7–0. Drive: 7 plays, 73 yards, 2:43.

Second quarter

- MICH – Mike Gillette 34-yard field goal, 14:57. Michigan 10–0. Drive: 10 plays, 55 yards, 4:13.
- MICH – Mike Gillette 19-yard field goal, 7:05. Michigan 13–0. Drive: 13 plays, 53 yards, 5:49.
- OSU – Everett Ross 61-yard pass from Tom Tupa (Matt Frantz kick), 1:36. Michigan 13–7. Drive: 10 plays, 61 yards, 4:08.

Third quarter

- OSU – Carlos Snow 70-yard pass from Tom Tupa (Matt Frantz kick), 12:32. Ohio St 14–13. Drive: 1 play, 70 yards, 0:12.
- OSU – Tom Tupa 1-yard run (kick failed), 7:11. Ohio St 20–13. Drive: 3 plays, 19 yards, 1:05.
- MICH – Leroy Hoard 10-yard run (Mike Gillette kick), 1:14. Tie 20–20. Drive: 6 plays, 46 yards, 2:00.

Fourth quarter

- OSU – Matt Frantz 26-yard field goal, 5:18. Ohio St 23–20. Drive: 15 plays, 77 yards.

Top passers

- OSU – Tom Tupa – 18/26, 219 yards, 2 TD
- MICH – Demetrius Brown – 5/13, 79 yards, INT

Top rushers

- OSU – Carlos Snow – 21 rushes, 67 yards
- MICH – Jamie Morris – 23 rushes, 130 yards, TD

Top receivers

- OSU – Carlos Snow – 3 receptions, 82 yards, TD
- MICH – Jerod Bunch – 1 reception, 39 yards

Earle Bruce's final game as Ohio State head coach.

== Roster ==
1987 Ohio State Buckeyes football team roster
Players
Coaches
Offense

Pos.	#	Name	Class
C	76	Dan Beatty	Fr
FB	38	Chris Boddie	Fr
OT	72	Henry Brown	Sr
RB	41	James Bryant	So
QB	16	Mike Chancey	Fr
SE	18	Gary Clift	Jr
G	66	Karl Coles	So
FB	44	George Cooper	Sr
SE	22	Tony Cupe	Fr
G	50	Jeff Davidson	So
C	77	Jim Davidson	Jr
SE	80	Bernard Edwards	Fr
TE	89	Jeff Ellis	Fr
FL	32	Tony Fenstermaker	So
OT	70	Steve France	So
QB	15	Greg Frey	Fr
RB	35	Jim Graham	Fr
FB	33	Steve Gresock	Sr
G	65	Erik Grimm	Fr
C	62	John Grubb	Sr
FL	26	Nate Harris	Sr
FB	39	Tyrone Harrison	Fr
TE	88	Alex Higdon	Sr
C	60	Dan Hirneise	Fr
TE	83	Frank Hoak	Jr
OT	71	Mike Huddleston	Fr
TE	87	Rich Huffman	Fr
TE	82	Jay Koch	Fr
G	73	Jeff Kuczek	Fr
TE	86	Gary Lickovitch	Fr
G	53	Paul Long	Fr
TE	95	Matt Manifold	So
FB	11	Bill Matlock	Jr
C	52	Tom Moore	Jr
OT	74	Tim Moxley	So
OT	63	Roy Nichols	Fr
TE	85	Jim Palmer	So
OT	75	John Peterson	Fr
RB	1	Lance Price	Fr
FL	5	Everett Ross	Jr
C	55	Tom Scholl	Jr
OT	69	Jay Shaffer	Sr
OT	78	Mike Shoaf	Fr
SE	4	Wes Siegenthaler	Fr
RB	25	Carlos Snow	Fr
RB	28	John Spencer	Fr
OT	79	Joe Staysniak	So
QB, P	19	Tom Tupa (C)	Sr
C	68	Jeff Uhlenhake	Jr
C	61	Ken Voll	Fr
QB	17	John Wagoner	Fr
RB, FL	42	Vince Workman	Jr
OL	51	Greg Zackeroff	Jr
TE	96	Srecko Zizakovic	So

Defense

Pos.	#	Name	Class
OLB	32	Tom Anderzack	Jr
ROV	3	Sean Bell	Jr
LB	91	Brian Benio	Fr
S	27	David Brown	So
CB	19	Joe Canestraro	Sr
DB	7	Vincent Clark	Fr
OLB	59	Matthew Closson	Fr
DT	92	Ken Coleman	Fr
LB	56	Orlando Craig	So
CB	21	Zack Dumas	So
LB	49	Andrew Gurd	Fr
DT	55	Ray Holliman	Sr
OLB	30	Dedrick Howard	So
LB	10	Derek Isaman	Jr
ROV	47	Ray Jackson	Sr
NG	95	John Kacherski	Fr
LB	62	Charles Keenan	So
OLB	14	Eric Kumerow	Sr
OLB	81	Tom Lease	Fr
DT	93	Derek MacCready	Jr
OLB	99	Michael McCray	Jr
DT	97	Tony Moore	Fr
ROV	46	Jim Peel	Fr
S	48	Mark Pelini	Fr
OLB	13	Scott Powell	Jr
LB	90	Fred Ridder	Sr
CB	43	Ceroy Robinson	So
CB	29	Greg Rogan	Sr
DB	24	Tim Rutledge	Fr
DT	98	Mike Showalter	So
LB	36	Chris Spielman (C)	Sr
LB	57	John Sullivan	Jr
NG	67	Mike Sullivan	Jr
NG	54	Pat Thomas	So
CB	26	Brian Tuffin	Sr
CB	37	William White (C)	Sr

Special teams

Pos.	#	Name	Class
K	12	Matt Frantz	Sr
K	9	Mike Morton	Sr
K	6	Pat O'Morrow	So
K, QB	8	Mark Smith	Fr

Head coach

- Earle Bruce

Coordinators/assistant coaches

- Gary Blackney – Defensive Coordinator (4th year)
- Bill Conley – Inside Linebackers (4th year)
- Steve Devine – Offensive Line – Guards, Centers (5th year)
- Randy Hart – Defensive Line (6th year)
- Chuck Heater – Defensive Backs (3rd year)
- Tom Lichtenberg – Quarterbacks, Receivers (2nd year)
- Bob Palcic – Offensive Line – Tackles, Tight Ends (2nd year)
- Fred Pagac – Outside Linebackers (10th year)
- Leonard Willis – Running Backs (3rd year)

Legend

- (C) Team captain
- (S) Suspended
- (I) Ineligible
- Injured
- Redshirt

Roster

== 1988 NFL draftees ==
Player	Round	Pick	Position	NFL club
Eric Kumerow	1	16	Defensive End	Miami Dolphins
Chris Spielman	2	29	Linebacker	Detroit Lions
Alex Higdon	3	56	Tight End	Atlanta Falcons
Tom Tupa	3	68	Quarterback	Phoenix Cardinals
William White	4	85	Defensive Back	Detroit Lions
George Cooper	6	156	Running Back	Miami Dolphins
Ray Jackson	7	185	Defensive Back	Seattle Seahawks
Henry Brown	10	277	Tackle	Washington Redskins
