= Robert McAllister =

Robert McAllister may refer to:

- Robert McAllister (politician) (1876–1963), businessman and politician in New Brunswick, Canada
- Bob McAllister (athlete) (1899–1962), American sprinter.
- Bobby McAllister (born 1963), American soccer player
- Bob McAllister (1934–1998), American television personality

== See also ==
- Robbie McAllister (born 1974), Scottish professional wrestler
- Bobby McAllister (gridiron football) (born 1966), American football and Canadian football quarterback
- Robert McCallister (disambiguation)
