= 1987 Purdue Boilermakers football team =

American college football season

1987 Purdue Boilermakers football
- Conference: Big Ten Conference
- Record: 3–7–1 (3–5 Big Ten)
- Head coach: Fred Akers (1st season)
- Offensive coordinator: Bob Stanley (1st season)
- Defensive coordinator: Phil Bennett (1st season)
- MVP: Anthony Hardy
- Captains: Mike Connors; Anthony Hardy; Fred Strickland
- Home stadium: Ross–Ade Stadium

1987 Big Ten Conference football standings
	Conf.					Overall
Team	W		L		T	W		L		T
No. 8 Michigan State $	7	–	0	–	1	9	–	2	–	1
No. 16 Iowa	6	–	2	–	0	10	–	3	–	0
Indiana	6	–	2	–	0	8	–	4	–	0
No. 19 Michigan	5	–	3	–	0	8	–	4	–	0
Ohio State	4	–	4	–	0	6	–	4	–	1
Minnesota	3	–	5	–	0	6	–	5	–	0
Purdue	3	–	5	–	0	3	–	7	–	1
Illinois	2	–	5	–	1	3	–	7	–	1
Northwestern	2	–	6	–	0	2	–	8	–	1
Wisconsin	1	–	7	–	0	3	–	8	–	0
$ – Conference champion; Rankings from AP Poll

The 1987 Purdue Boilermakers football team represented Purdue University as a member of the Big Ten Conference during the 1987 NCAA Division I-A football season. Led by first-year head coach Fred Akers, the Boilermakers compiled an overall record of 3–7–1 with a mark of 3–5 in conference play, tying for sixth place in the Big Ten. Purdue played home games at Ross–Ade Stadium in West Lafayette, Indiana.

== Schedule ==
Date	Opponent	Site	Result	Attendance	Source
September 12	at No. 12 Washington*	Husky Stadium; Seattle, WA	L 10–28	70,492	
September 19	Louisville*	Ross–Ade Stadium; West Lafayette, IN	T 22–22	63,125	
September 26	No. 8 Notre Dame*	Ross–Ade Stadium; West Lafayette, IN (rivalry)	L 20–44	68,528	
October 3	at Minnesota	Hubert H. Humphrey Metrodome; Minneapolis, MN	L 19–21	49,376	
October 10	Illinois	Ross–Ade Stadium; West Lafayette, IN (rivalry)	W 9–3	59,483	
October 17	No. 17 Ohio State	Ross–Ade Stadium; West Lafayette, IN	L 17–20	66,501	
October 24	at Iowa	Kinnick Stadium; Iowa City, IA	L 14–38	67,700	
October 31	Wisconsin^{†}	Ross–Ade Stadium; West Lafayette, IN	W 49–14	60,267	
November 7	at No. 15 Michigan State	Spartan Stadium; East Lansing, MI	L 3–45	76,933	
November 14	Northwestern	Ross–Ade Stadium; West Lafayette, IN	W 20–15	50,468	
November 21	at No. 20 Indiana	Memorial Stadium; Bloomington, IN (Old Oaken Bucket)	L 14–35	51,951	
*Non-conference game; ^{†}Homecoming; Rankings from AP Poll released prior to the game

== Preseason ==
Jeff George transferred following the hiring of Fred Akers as head coach, who had recently been fired from Texas.

== Game summaries ==
=== Louisville ===
- James Medlock 25 rushes, 126 yards

=== Illinois ===
- James Medlock 33 rushes, 131 yards

=== Ohio State ===
#17 Ohio State Buckeyes (3–1–1) at Purdue Boilermakers (1–3–1)

Quarter	1	2	3	4	Total
Ohio St	7	10	0	3	20
Purdue	0	0	10	7	17

at Ross–Ade Stadium, West Lafayette, Indiana

- Date: October 17, 1987
- Game time: 3:30 p.m. EDT
- Game weather: Overcast, 53 °F (12 °C)
- Game attendance: 66,501
- Referee: John Nealon
- TV: Raycom
- Box Score

Team	Category	Player	Statistics
Ohio St	Passing	Tom Tupa	8/16, 174 Yds, TD
Ohio St	Rushing	James Bryant	23 Rush, 77 Yds
Ohio St	Receiving	Vince Workman	4 Rec, 88 Yds, TD
Purdue	Passing	Doug Downing	20/26, 218 Yds, 2 TD, INT
Purdue	Rushing	James Medlock	17 Rush, 44 Yds
Purdue	Receiving	Calvin Williams	8 Rec, 107 Yds, 2 TD

Scoring summary

Quarter	Time	Drive			Team	Scoring information	Score	
Quarter	Time	Plays	Yards	TOP	Team	Scoring information	OSU	PU
1	5:30	9	66	4:10	Ohio St	Vince Workman 36-yard touchdown reception from Tom Tupa, Matt Frantz kick good	7	0
2	4:45	2	9	0:42	Ohio St	Tom Tupa 6-yard touchdown run, Matt Frantz kick good	14	0
2	0:22	8	47	1:25	Ohio St	18-yard field goal by Matt Frantz	17	0
3	6:33	13	65	6:44	Purdue	25-yard field goal by Jonathan Briggs	17	3
3	1:00	7	74	1:32	Purdue	Calvin Williams 10-yard touchdown reception from Doug Downing, Jonathan Briggs kick good	17	10
4	13:09	3	38	0:57	Purdue	Calvin Williams 30-yard touchdown reception from Doug Downing, Jonathan Briggs kick good	17	17
4	3:10	6	35	3:13	Ohio St	50-yard field goal by Matt Frantz	20	17
"TOP" = time of possession. For other American football terms, see Glossary of American football.							20	17

=== Wisconsin ===
Wisconsin Badgers at Purdue Boilermakers

Quarter	1	2	3	4	Total
Wisconsin	0	7	7	0	14
Purdue	14	14	0	21	49

at Ross–Ade Stadium • West Lafayette, Indiana

- Date: October 31
- Game attendance: 60,267

Game information

- PUR - Myles 4 yard run (Briggs kick)
- PUR - Moore 34 yard pass from McCarthy (Briggs kick)
- PUR - Myles 2 yard run (Briggs kick)
- WIS - Bestor 17 yard pass from Keyes (Gregoire kick)
- PUR - Hardy 37 yard pass from Mascheck (Briggs kick)
- WIS - Artley 2 yard run (Gregoire kick)
- PUR - Hardy 42 yard pass from McCarthy (Briggs kick)
- PUR - C. Williams 9 yard pass from McCarthy (Briggs kick)
- PUR - Myles 4 yard run (Briggs kick)

Purdue

- Shawn McCarthy 20/31, 333 yards

=== Northwestern ===
	1	2	3	4	Total
Northwestern	0	6	9	0	15
Purdue	14	3	0	3	20

== Roster ==
1987 Purdue Boilermakers football team roster
Players
Coaches
Offense

Pos.	#	Name	Class
OL		Keith Brown
RB		Jerry Chaney
OL		Mike Connors
OL		Bruce Crites
QB		Doug Downing
WR		Anthony Hardy
QB		Mark Mascheck
RB		James Medlock
WR		Todd Moore
RB		Darren Myles
RB		Scott Nelson
TE		Dwayne O'Connor
WR		Robert Oglesby
OL		Jim Richmond
OL		Anthony Rose
RB		Jarrett Scales
WR		Lance Scheib
RB		Ernie Schramayr
TE		Brad Schumacher
RB		Jerome Sparkman
TE		Kelly Turner
WR		Calvin Williams	So

Defense

Pos.	#	Name	Class
DL		Scott Conover
DB		Cris Dishman
LB		Art DuBose
DB		Marc Foster
DL		Bill Hitchcock
DB		Steve Jackson
DB		Scott Kalinoski
DL		Chris Keevers
DB		Derrick Kelson
DL		Ken Kushner
DL		Donzel Leggett
LB		Keith Norman
LB		Fred Strickland
DL		Tony Visco
LB		Jerrol Williams

Special teams

Pos.	#	Name	Class
K		Jonathan Briggs
P, QB		Shawn McCarthy	So

Head coach

- Fred Akers

Coordinators/assistant coaches

- Brian Cabral (ILB)
- Dan Lounsbury (RB/WR)
- Bill Michael (TE/OT)
- Mike Sanford Sr. (QB)

Legend

- (C) Team captain
- (S) Suspended
- (I) Ineligible
- Injured
- Redshirt
