= Lorenzo White =

American football player (born 1966)

No. 44, 34
- Position: Running back

Personal information
- Born: September 12, 1966 (age 60); Hollywood, Florida, U.S.
- Listed height: 5 ft 11 in (1.80 m)
- Listed weight: 222 lb (101 kg)

Career information
- High school: Dillard (Fort Lauderdale, Florida)
- College: Michigan State (1984–1987)
- NFL draft: 1988: 1st round, 22nd overall pick

Career history
- Houston Oilers (1988–1994); Cleveland Browns (1995); New Orleans Saints (1996)*
- * Offseason or practice squad member only

Awards and highlights
- Pro Bowl (1992); Unanimous All-American (1985); Consensus All-American (1987); Big Ten Most Valuable Player (1987); 2× Big Ten Co-Player of the Year (1985, 1987); 2× First-team All-Big Ten (1985, 1987); Second-team All-Big Ten (1986); Michigan State University Hall of Fame; Rose Bowl Game Hall of Fame; Michigan Sports Hall of Fame

Career NFL statistics
- Rushing yards: 4,242
- Rushing average: 4
- Rushing touchdowns: 30
- Receptions: 192
- Receiving yards: 1,738
- Receiving touchdowns: 6
- Stats at Pro Football Reference
- College Football Hall of Fame

Lorenzo Maurice White (born July 12, 1966) is an American former professional football player who was a running back in the National Football League (NFL) for the Houston Oilers (1988–1994) and Cleveland Browns (1995). He was voted to the Pro Bowl in 1992, recording his best season with 1,226 rushing yards and 1,867 yards from scrimmage.

White played college football for Michigan State Spartans from 1984 to 1987, and was a consensus All-American in 1985 and 1987. He won the Big Ten Most Valuable Player in 1987, currently the last Spartan to be selected. He also continues to hold Michigan State records for rushing yardage in a career (4,887), rushing yardage in a season (2,066), rushing touchdowns in a career (43), rushing attempts in a season (419) and rushing attempts in a career (1,082).

White was inducted into the College Football Hall of Fame in 2019. He has also been inducted into the Michigan State University Hall of Fame (2010), the Rose Bowl Hall of Fame (2022) and the Michigan Sports Hall of Fame (2023).

== Early life ==
White was born in 1966 in Hollywood, Florida. He was raised by his mother, Gloria Golden, and his sister, Carla Golden. When White was in seventh grade, his step-father was shot and killed.

White played high school football at Dillard High School in Fort Lauderdale, Florida, rushing for over 1,000 yards in both 1982 and 1983. As a senior, he led the Dillard Panthers to a district title and was named the Broward County Offensive Player of the Year after gaining 1,255 yards and scoring 19 touchdowns. His coach, Otis Gray, said: "He is the kind of kid that comes along once in a lifetime. Not only a super athlete, but a super kid." One sports writer described White's impact: "White quickly emerged as the best running back the Panthers had ever seen. He was big, had great moves and unbelievable talent. Three years later, every college scout in the country was inquiring about him." He received more than 100 scholarship offers, finally narrowing his list to Michigan, Michigan State, Pittsburgh, Indiana, and Georgia.

== College career ==
=== 1984 season ===
In February 1984 White signed with Michigan State University. As a freshman in 1984, he appeared in 11 games for the Spartans and led the team with 616 rushing yards. Against Northwestern on November 3, he totaled 170 rushing yards and scored two touchdowns.

=== 1985 season ===
In 1985, White led the nation with 2,066 rushing yards. He averaged 4.9 yards per carry and scored 17 touchdowns. He had four games during the 1985 season in which he rushed for at least 223 yards: Indiana (286 yards and three touchdowns on 25 carries); Purdue (244 yards and two touchdowns on 53 carries); Iowa (226 yards on 39 carries); and Wisconsin (223 yards and one touchdown on 42 carries). In the 1985 Hall of Fame Classic, White rushed for 158 yards, but fumbled late in the fourth quarter to set up Georgia Tech's game-winning touchdown.

White was the first Big Ten player to rush for over 2,000 yards and the fifth player in Division I FBS history to reach the mark. He was a consensus pick on the 1985 All-America football team and the 1985 All-Big Ten Conference football team, and finished fourth in the 1985 Heisman Trophy voting, which was won by Bo Jackson. He was the first player to reach 2,000 rushing yards without winning the Heisman Trophy.

=== 1986 season ===
As a junior in 1986, White sprained his left knee on October 4, missed two games, and was also impaired by recurring right ankle problems. He finished the season with 634 rushing yards, an average 3.9 yards per carry, and scored six touchdowns.

=== 1987 season ===
As a senior in 1987, White totaled 1,572 rushing yards and 16 touchdowns, helping the Spartans to a Big Ten Conference championship and victories over #12 Michigan and #15 Ohio State. Against #16 Indiana, he rushed for a career-high 292 yards on 56 carries. In the 1988 Rose Bowl, White's final game for Michigan State, he rushed for 113 yards and two touchdowns to lead the Spartans to a 20–17 victory over #16 USC.

At the end of the regular season, White won the Chicago Tribune Silver Football as the most valuable player in the Big Ten Conference and finished fourth in the voting for the 1987 Heisman Trophy. He was also selected for the second time in his career as a consensus first-team pick on the 1987 All-America football team and the 1987 All-Big Ten Conference football team.

At the time his college football career ended, White's 4,887 rushing yards ranked second in Big Ten Conference history, trailing only Archie Griffin. His 1,082 carries ranked first in conference history, though that record has since been surpassed. Through the 2022 season, White continued to hold Michigan State records for rushing yardage in a season (2,066), rushing yardage in a career (4,887), rushing touchdowns in a career (43), rushing attempts in a season (419), and rushing attempts in a career (1,082).

== Professional career ==
=== 1988 and 1989 seasons ===
White was selected by the Houston Oilers in the first round (22nd overall pick) of the 1988 NFL draft. During the 1988 and 1989 seasons, White had limited playing time as a backup to Mike Rozier and Alonzo Highsmith. He tallied 115 rushing yards in 1988 and 349 yards in 1989.

=== 1990: Houston's starting running back ===
White was not happy sitting on the bench. He recalled: "There had never been a time when I didn't run." After the 1989 season, he asked to be traded, but the Oilers kept him. He became the team's lead running back in 1990, starting all 16 games at the position. In an offense focused on the passing game (Warren Moon passed for 4,689 yards in 1990), White rushed for 125 yards against Buffalo, 116 yards and four touchdowns against Cleveland, and 90 yards and a touchdown against Pittsburgh. For the season, he totaled 702 rushing yards, averaging 4.2 yards per carry, caught 39 passes for 368 yards, and scored a career-high 12 touchdowns. After the 1990 season, Warren Moon praised White:

For the last two years, there has been so much talk about him being traded, yet he handled those situations in a mature manner. He didn't get down. He continued to work hard. For him to have handled it the way he did, he's got to feel real proud. Now he's been given the opportunity. That's all a player wants. It's all White wanted.

=== 1991 season ===
In 1991, White held out and missed the first three regular-season games. When White returned to the lineup, he was a backup to Allen Pinkett. In 13 games, White gained 465 rushing yards, averaging 4.2 yards per carry, and caught 27 passes for 211 yards. Sports writer Randy Riggs later wrote that White "muddled through a forgettable year in which he rushed for only 465 yards."

=== 1992: White's Pro Bowl season ===
White regained his role as the Oilers' starting running back in 1992, starting all 16 games for the club. He tallied a career-high 1,226 rushing yards (4.6 yards per carry), caught 57 passes for 641 yards, and scored eight touchdowns. He ranked fourth in the NFL with 1,867 yards from scrimmage and fifth in the league with 1,226 rushing yards and an average of 76.6 rushing yards per game. He also earned his first berth in the Pro Bowl after the 1992 season.

=== 1993 and 1994 seasons ===
White held out during training camp in 1993, seeking a contract paying him $2 million for the 1993 season. In late August, he signed a one-year contract for the price they had originally offered -- $1.53 million. He also sustained a torn hamstring at midseason, lost the starting job to Gary Brown and was limited to eight games as a backup, gaining 465 yards and averaging 3.5 yards per carry.

White pursued free agency prior to the 1994 season, but he re-signed with the Oilers in late August, agreeing to a one-year contract for $475,000. He appeared in 15 games (eight as a starter) for the Oilers in 1994. He totaled 757 rushing yards, the second best season total of his NFL career.

=== 1995: Cleveland Browns ===
In April 1995, White signed as a free agent with the Cleveland Browns. He received a three-year contract worth $2.75 million, including a $650,000 signing bonus. White appeared in 12 games for the Browns (two as a starter) and tallied 163 rushing yards for a career-low 2.6 yards per carry.

White was signed to a one-year contract by the New Orleans Saints prior to the 1996 season, but he was released in late August.

Over eight years in the NFL, White recorded 4,242 rushing yards, averaging 4.0 yards per carry, caught 192 passes for 1,738 yards, totaled 5,980 yards from scrimmage, and scored 30 touchdowns. White was also known for ball security. He once had a streak of 485 consecutive carries without a fumble.

== Career statistics ==
=== NFL ===
Year	Team	GP	Rushing					Receiving				
Year	Team	GP	Att	Yds	Avg	Lng	TD	Rec	Yds	Avg	Lng	TD
1988	HOU	11	31	115	3.7	16	0	0	0	0.0	0	0
1989	HOU	16	104	349	3.4	33	5	6	37	6.2	11	0
1990	HOU	16	168	702	4.2	22	8	39	368	9.4	29	4
1991	HOU	13	110	465	4.2	20	4	27	211	7.8	20	0
1992	HOU	16	265	1,226	4.6	44	7	57	641	11.2	69	1
1993	HOU	8	131	465	3.5	14	2	34	229	6.7	20	0
1994	HOU	15	191	757	4.0	33	3	21	188	9.0	41	1
1995	CLE	12	62	163	2.6	11	1	8	64	8.0	28	0
Career		107	1,062	4,242	4.0	44	30	192	1,738	9.1	69	6

=== College ===
Year	Team	GP	Rushing				Receiving		
Year	Team	GP	Att	Yds	Avg	TD	Rec	Yds	TD
1984	MSU	11	142	616	4.3	4	8	44	0
1985	MSU	12	419	2,066	4.9	17	6	28	0
1986	MSU	11	164	633	3.9	6	11	78	0
1987	MSU	12	357	1,572	4.4	16	12	115	0
Career		46	1,082	4,887	4.5	43	37	265	0

== Later years and legacy ==
In 2015, the Lansing State Journal rated White at No. 2 on its list of the 50 greatest Michigan State football players of all time. At the time, columnist Graham Couch wrote: "White had an array of moves. He changed directions and ran laterally as fast as he hit the hole. He could freeze defenders with a simple dip of the shoulders, and did so often."

In January 2019, in his ninth year on the ballot, White was named to the College Football Hall of Fame. He was the 10th Michigan State player inducted into the Hall. He was also inducted into the Michigan State University Athletics Hall of Fame in 2010, the Rose Bowl Hall of Fame in 2022, and the Michigan Sports Hall of Fame in 2023.

== See also ==
- List of college football yearly rushing leaders
