= 1987 Iowa Hawkeyes football team =

American college football season

1987 Iowa Hawkeyes football

Holiday Bowl champion

Holiday Bowl, W 20–19 vs. Wyoming
- Conference: Big Ten Conference

Ranking
- Coaches: No. 16
- AP: No. 16
- Record: 10–3 (6–2 Big Ten)
- Head coach: Hayden Fry (9th season)
- Offensive coordinator: Bill Snyder (9th season)
- Offensive scheme: Pro-style
- Defensive coordinator: Bill Brashier (9th season)
- Base defense: 5–2
- MVPs: Marv Cook; Dave Haight; Chuck Hartlieb
- Captains: Kerry Burt; Quinn Early; Mike Flagg; Dave Haight; J. J. Puk
- Home stadium: Kinnick Stadium

1987 Big Ten Conference football standings
	Conf.					Overall
Team	W		L		T	W		L		T
No. 8 Michigan State $	7	–	0	–	1	9	–	2	–	1
No. 16 Iowa	6	–	2	–	0	10	–	3	–	0
Indiana	6	–	2	–	0	8	–	4	–	0
No. 19 Michigan	5	–	3	–	0	8	–	4	–	0
Ohio State	4	–	4	–	0	6	–	4	–	1
Minnesota	3	–	5	–	0	6	–	5	–	0
Purdue	3	–	5	–	0	3	–	7	–	1
Illinois	2	–	5	–	1	3	–	7	–	1
Northwestern	2	–	6	–	0	2	–	8	–	1
Wisconsin	1	–	7	–	0	3	–	8	–	0
$ – Conference champion; Rankings from AP Poll

The 1987 Iowa Hawkeyes football team was an American football team that represented the University of Iowa as a member of the Big Ten Conference during the 1987 NCAA Division I-A football season. In their ninth year under head coach Hayden Fry, the Hawkeyes compiled a 10–3 record (6–2 in conference games), tied for second place in the Big Ten, and outscored opponents by a total of 360 to 231. In games against ranked opponents, they lost to No. 17 Tennessee and defeated No. 11 Indiana, and concluded the season with a victory over Wyoming in the 1987 Holiday Bowl. They were ranked No. 16 in the final UPI and AP polls.

The team's statistical leaders included quarterback Chuck Hartlieb with 2,855 passing yards, running back Kevin Harmon with 668 rushing yards, wide receiver Quinn Early with 61 receptions for 978 yards, and kicker Rob Houghtlin with a school-record 102 points scored. Defensive lineman Dave Haight was selected as the Big Ten Defensive Lineman of the Year. Six Iowa players received first-team honors on the 1987 All-Big Ten Conference football team.

The team played its home games at Kinnick Stadium in Iowa City, Iowa.

== Schedule ==
Date	Opponent	Rank	Site	TV	Result	Attendance	Source
August 30	vs. No. 17 Tennessee*	No. 16	Giants Stadium; East Rutherford, NJ (Kickoff Classic)	ABC	L 22–23	54,861	
September 12	at Arizona*		Arizona Stadium; Tucson, AZ		W 15–14	57,284	
September 19	at Iowa State*		Cyclone Stadium; Ames, IA (rivalry)		W 48–9	54,101	
September 26	Kansas State*	No. 19	Kinnick Stadium; Iowa City, IA		W 38–13	67,700	
October 3	Michigan State	No. 17	Kinnick Stadium; Iowa City, IA		L 14–19	67,700	
October 10	at Wisconsin		Camp Randall Stadium; Madison, WI (rivalry)		W 31–10	74,645	
October 17	at Michigan		Michigan Stadium; Ann Arbor, MI	ABC	L 10–37	105,406	
October 24	Purdue		Kinnick Stadium; Iowa City, IA	ABC	W 38–14	67,700	
October 31	No. 11 Indiana		Kinnick Stadium; Iowa City, IA		W 29–21	67,700	
November 7	at Northwestern		Dyche Stadium; Evanston, IL		W 52–24	38,694	
November 14	at Ohio State		Ohio Stadium; Columbus, OH		W 29–27	90,090	
November 21	Minnesota	No. 18	Kinnick Stadium; Iowa City, IA (rivalry)		W 34–20	67,700	
December 30	vs. Wyoming*	No. 18	Jack Murphy Stadium; San Diego, CA (Holiday Bowl)	ESPN	W 20–19	61,892	
*Non-conference game; Rankings from AP Poll released prior to the game; Source:

== Rankings ==
Ranking movements Legend: ██ Increase in ranking ██ Decrease in ranking — = Not ranked RV = Received votes
	Week														
Poll	Pre	1	2	3	4	5	6	7	8	9	10	11	12	13	Final
AP	16	RV	RV	19	17	—	RV	—	—	—	18	19	18	18	16
Coaches	18	—	—	—	—	—	RV		RV		20	RV	20	RV	16

== Game summaries ==
=== Vs. Tennessee ===
Kickoff Classic

Team	1	2	3	4	Total
#16 Hawkeyes	3	7	9	3	22
• #17 Volunteers	0	14	0	9	23

- Date: August 30
- Location: Giants Stadium, East Rutherford, New Jersey
- Game attendance: 54,681
- Game weather: 63 °F (17 °C), Sunny, Wind N 5 mph (8.0 km/h)
- TV announcers (ABC): Keith Jackson, Bob Griese, and Mike Adamle
- Source: Box score Archived 2020-01-07 at the Wayback Machine

Scoring summary
1	4:53	IOWA	Rob Houghtlin 42-yard field goal	Iowa 3–0
2	10:09	UT	W. Howard 1-yard run (Reich kick)	Tenn 7–3
2	5:46	UT	D. Miller 96-yard fumble return (Reich kick)	Tenn 14–3
2	1:36	IOWA	Kevin Harmon 23-yard pass from Chuck Hartlieb (Houghtlin kick)	Tenn 14–10
3	10:56	IOWA	Houghtlin 27-yard field goal	Tenn 14–13
3	1:53	IOWA	Kevin Harmon 20-yard run (two-point conversion failed)	Iowa 19-14
4		UT	Phil Reich 45-yard field goal	Iowa 19-17
4		IOWA	Rob Houghtlin 42-yard field goal	Iowa 22-17
4	5:14	UT	Phil Reich 25-yard field goal	Iowa 22-20
4	0:03	UT	Phil Reich 20-yard field goal	Tenn 23–22

=== At Arizona ===
Iowa at Arizona

Team	1	2	3	4	Total
• Hawkeyes	6	3	0	6	15
Wildcats	0	7	7	0	14

- Date: September 12
- Location: Arizona Stadium, Tucson, Arizona
- Game attendance: 57,284
- Source: Box Score and Game Story

Scoring summary
1	IOWA	Rob Houghtlin 27-yard field goal	IOWA 3-0
1	IOWA	Rob Houghtlin 21-yard field goal	IOWA 6-0
2	IOWA	Rob Houghtlin 19-yard field goal	IOWA 9-0
2	Ariz	Lewis 1-yard run (Coston kick)	IOWA 9-7
3	Ariz	Watters 3-yard run (Coston kick)	Ariz 14-9
4	IOWA	Bass 3-yard run (run failed)	IOWA 15-14

Game statistics	IOWA	ARIZ
First downs	21	19
Total yards	371	279
Passing yards	150	115
Rushing yards	221	164
Penalties	5–36	4–24
Turnovers	0	4

=== At Iowa State ===
Iowa at Iowa State

Team	1	2	3	4	Total
• Hawkeyes	10	14	10	14	48
Cyclones	3	6	0	0	9

- Date: September 19
- Location: Jack Trice Stadium, Ames, Iowa
- Game attendance: 54,101
- Source: Box Score and Game Story

Scoring summary
1	ISU	Shudak 27-yard field goal	ISU 3-0
1	IOWA	Rob Houghtlin 30-yard field goal	Tied 3-3
1	IOWA	Harmon 11-yard run (Houghtlin kick)	IOWA 10-3
2	ISU	Shudak 47-yard field goal	IOWA 10-6
2	IOWA	Harmon 3-yard run (Houghtlin kick)	IOWA 17-6
2	IOWA	Harmon 3-yard run (Houghtlin kick)	IOWA 24-6
2	ISU	Shudak 34-yard field goal	IOWA 24-9
3	IOWA	Rob Houghtlin 55-yard field goal	IOWA 27-9
3	IOWA	Hudson 8-yard pass from Hartlieb (Houghtlin kick)	IOWA 34-9
4	IOWA	Stewart 1-yard run (Houghtlin kick)	IOWA 41-9
4	IOWA	Poholsky 3-yard run (Houghtlin kick)	IOWA 48-9

Game statistics	IOWA	ISU
First downs	26	12
Total yards	455	259
Passing yards	202	155
Rushing yards	253	104
Penalties	4–24	6–30
Turnovers	2	3

=== Kansas State ===
Kansas State at Iowa

Team	1	2	3	4	Total
Wildcats	7	3	3	0	13
• #19 Hawkeyes	14	7	0	17	38

- Date: September 26
- Location: Kinnick Stadium, Iowa City, Iowa
- Game attendance: 67,700
- Source: Box Score and Game Story

Scoring summary
1	KSU	Jordan 4-yard pass from Swim (Porter kick)	KSU 7-0
1	Iowa	Hudson 5-yard run (Houghtlin kick)	Tied 7-7
1	Iowa	Harmon 1-yard run (Houghtlin kick)	Iowa 14-7
2	Iowa	Hudson 1-yard run (Houghtlin kick)	Iowa 21-7
2	KSU	Porter 41-yard field goal	Iowa 21-10
3	KSU	Porter 34-yard field goal	Iowa 21-13
4	Iowa	Early 14-yard pass from McGwire (Houghtlin kick)	Iowa 28-13
4	Iowa	Rob Houghtlin 20-yard field goal	Iowa 31-13
4	Iowa	Marciano 8-yard pass from McGwire (Houghtlin kick)	Iowa 38-13

Game statistics	KSU	IOWA
First downs	11	27
Total yards	188	443
Passing yards	104	271
Rushing yards	84	172
Penalties	10–76	6–44
Turnovers	5	7

=== Michigan State ===
Michigan State at Iowa

Team	1	2	3	4	Total
• Spartans	7	0	6	6	19
#17 Hawkeyes	7	7	0	0	14

- Date: October 3
- Location: Kinnick Stadium, Iowa City, Iowa
- Game attendance: 67,700
- Source: Box Score and Game Story

Scoring summary
1	IOWA	Early 19-yard pass from Dan McGwire (Houghtlin kick)	IOWA 7-0
1	Mich St	White 5-yard run (Langeloh kick)	Tied 7-7
2	Iowa	Watkins 14-yard pass from McGwire (Houghtlin kick)	IOWA 14-7
3	Mich St	Langeloh 21-yard field goal	IOWA 14-10
3	Mich St	Langeloh 46-yard field goal	IOWA 14-13
4	Mich St	Sargent 8-yard pass from McAllister (pass failed)	Mich St 19-14

Game statistics	MSU	IOWA
First downs	16	15
Total yards	249	214
Passing yards	13	230
Rushing yards	236	(-16)
Penalties	13–102	7–50
Turnovers	1	1

=== At Wisconsin ===
Iowa at Wisconsin

Team	1	2	3	4	Total
• Hawkeyes	7	14	7	3	31
Badgers	0	3	7	0	10

- Date: October 10
- Location: Camp Randall Stadium, Madison, Wisconsin
- Game attendance: 74,645
- Source: Box Score and Game Story

Scoring summary
1	IOWA	Cook 51-yard pass from Hartlieb (Houghtlin kick)	IOWA 7-0
2	IOWA	Hartlieb 1-yard run (Houghtlin kick)	IOWA 14-0
2	IOWA	Bass 2-yard run (Houghtlin kick)	IOWA 21-0
2	Wisc	Gregoire 37-yard field goal	IOWA 21-3
3	IOWA	Early 9-yard pass from Hartlieb (Houghtlin kick)	IOWA 28-3
3	Wisc	Artley 66-yard run (Gregoire kick)	IOWA 28-10
4	IOWA	Houghtlin 32-yard field goal	IOWA 31-10

Game statistics	IOWA	WIS
First downs	23	10
Total yards	412	175
Passing yards	223	58
Rushing yards	189	117
Penalties	5–50	3–35
Turnovers	3	4

=== At Michigan ===
Iowa at Michigan

Team	1	2	3	4	Total
Hawkeyes	0	10	0	0	10
• Wolverines	6	24	0	7	37

- Date: October 17
- Location: Michigan Stadium, Ann Arbor, Michigan
- Game attendance: 105,406
- Source: Box Score and Game Story

Scoring summary
1	Mich	D. Brown 1-yard run (kick failed)	Mich 6-0
2	Mich	Gillette 42-yard field goal	Mich 9-0
2	Mich	Kolesar 35-yard pass from Brown (Gillette kick)	Mich 16-0
2	IOWA	Clark 6-yard pass from Hartlieb (Houghtlin kick)	Mich 16-7
2	Mich	McMurtry 12-yard pass from Brown (Gillette kick)	Mich 23-7
2	IOWA	Houghtlin 46-yard field goal	Mich 23-10
2	Mich	McMurtry 12-yard pass from Brown (Gillette kick)	Mich 30-10
4	Mich	Morris 3-yard run (Gillette kick)	Mich 37-10

Game statistics	IOWA	MICH
First downs	13	19
Total yards	349	352
Passing yards	362	190
Rushing yards	(-13)	162
Penalties	4–42	2–16
Turnovers	1	2

=== Purdue ===
Purdue at Iowa

Team	1	2	3	4	Total
Boilermakers	0	7	7	0	14
• Hawkeyes	14	7	10	7	38

- Date: October 24
- Location: Kinnick Stadium, Iowa City, Iowa
- Game attendance: 67,700
- Television network: ABC
- Source: Box Score and Game Story

Scoring summary
1	Iowa	Bass 3-yard run (Houghtlin kick)	Iowa 7-0
1	Iowa	Quinn Early 38-yard pass from Chuck Hartlieb (Houghtlin kick)	Iowa 14-0
2	Iowa	Travis Watkins 55-yard pass from Chuck Hartlieb (Houghtlin kick)	Iowa 21-0
2	Purdue	Darren Myles 1-yard run (kick)	Iowa 21-7
3	Purdue	Hardy 22-yard pass from McCarthy (kick)	Iowa 21-14
3	Iowa	Craig Clark 46-yard pass from Chuck Hartlieb (Houghtlin kick)	Iowa 28-14
3	Iowa	Rob Houghtlin 30-yard field goal	Iowa 31-14
4	Iowa	T. Stewart 13-yard run (Houghtlin kick)	Iowa 38-14

Game statistics	PUR	IOWA
First downs	16	29
Total yards	301	520
Passing yards	259	317
Rushing yards	42	203
Penalties	5–45	7–44
Turnovers	5	2

=== Indiana ===
Indiana at Iowa

Team	1	2	3	4	Total
#11 Hoosiers	0	7	7	7	21
• Hawkeyes	13	7	0	9	29

- Date: October 31
- Location: Kinnick Stadium, Iowa City, Iowa
- Game attendance: 67,700
- Source: Box Score and Game Story

Scoring summary
1	Iowa	Quinn Early 35-yard pass from Chuck Hartlieb (Houghtlin kick)	Iowa 7-0
1	Iowa	Rob Houghtlin 23-yard field goal	Iowa 10-0
1	Iowa	Rob Houghtlin 37-yard field goal	Iowa 13-0
2	Indiana	E. Jones 41-yard pass from Schnell (Stoyanovich kick)	Iowa 13-7
2	Iowa	Bass 3-yard run (Houghtlin kick)	Iowa 20-7
3	Indiana	Thompson 1-yard run (Stoyanovich kick)	Iowa 20-14
4	Indiana	E. Jones 32-yard pass from Kramme (Stoyanovich kick)	Indiana 21-20
4	Iowa	Hudson 1-yard run (pass failed)	Iowa 26-21
4	Iowa	Rob Houghtlin 28-yard field goal	Iowa 29-21

Game statistics	IND	IOWA
First downs	16	23
Total yards	305	445
Passing yards	237	282
Rushing yards	68	163
Penalties	8–91	8–72
Turnovers	3	2

=== At Northwestern ===
Iowa at Northwestern

Team	1	2	3	4	Total
• Hawkeyes	7	28	14	3	52
Wildcats	10	7	7	0	24

- Date: November 7
- Location: Dyche Stadium
- Game attendance: 38,694
- Sources: Box Score and Game Story

Scoring summary
Q1	NW	McClellan 10-yard pass from Greenfield (Adler kick)	NW 7–0
Q1	NW	Adler 25-yard field goal	NW 10–0
Q1	IOWA	Early 35-yard pass from Hartlieb (Houghtlin kick)	NW 10–7
Q2	NW	Pennington 75-yard interception return (Adler kick)	NW 17–7
Q2	IOWA	Watkins 22-yard pass from Hartlieb (Houghtlin kick)	NW 17–14
Q2	IOWA	Watkins 7-yard pass from Hartlieb (Houghtlin kick)	IOWA 21–17
Q2	IOWA	Hudson 7-yard pass from Hartlieb (Houghtlin kick)	IOWA 28–17
Q2	IOWA	Early 9-yard pass from Hartlieb (Houghtlin kick)	IOWA 35–17
Q3	IOWA	Early 44-yard pass from Hartlieb (Houghtlin kick)	IOWA 42–17
Q3	IOWA	Early 95-yard pass from Hartlieb (Houghtlin kick)	IOWA 49–17
Q3	NW	Greenfield 1-yard run (Adler kick)	IOWA 49–24
Q4	IOWA	Houghtlin 26-yard field goal	IOWA 52–24

Chuck Hartlieb completed 25 of 32 passes for 471 yards and a Big Ten single-game record 7 touchdowns. Wide receiver Quinn Early hauled in 10 passes and set school records with 256 yards receiving (Big Ten record at the time) and 4 touchdown receptions. The 584 team passing yards remains a single-game school record.

Game statistics	IOWA	NW
First downs	28	21
Total yards	674	364
Passing yards	584	245
Rushing yards	90	119
Penalties	4–38	9–65
Turnovers	4	8

=== At Ohio State ===
Iowa at Ohio State

Team	1	2	3	4	Total
• Hawkeyes	3	12	0	14	29
Buckeyes	7	7	7	6	27

- Date: November 14
- Location: Ohio Stadium, Columbus, Ohio
- Game attendance: 90,090
- Game weather: 61 °F (16 °C), Clear and sunny
- Referee: Gil Marchman
- Source: Box Score and Game Story

Scoring summary
1	10:08	OSU	Ross 24-yard pass from Tupa (Frantz kick)	Ohio St 7–0
1	7:34	IOWA	Rob Houghtlin 39-yard field goal	Ohio St 7–3
2	11:19	OSU	Ross 60-yard pass from Tupa (Frantz kick)	Ohio St 14–3
2	9:10	IOWA	Kevin Harmon 50-yard run (pass failed)	Ohio St 14–9
2	3:14	IOWA	Houghtlin 41-yard field goal	Ohio St 14–12
2	0:00	IOWA	Houghtlin 22-yard field goal	IOWA 15–14
3	6:14	OSU	Ellis 20-yard pass from Tupa (Frantz kick)	OSU 21-15
4	9:11	IOWA	Hudson 1-yard run (Houghtlin kick)	IOWA 22-21
4	2:45	OSU	Snow 14-yard run (run failed)	OSU 27-22
4	0:06	IOWA	Marv Cook 28-yard pass from Chuck Hartlieb (Houghtlin kick)	IOWA 29–27

With six seconds left, Chuck Hartlieb threw a 28-yard touchdown pass to Marv Cook on fourth-and-23 to earn Iowa's first victory at Ohio Stadium since 1959.

Game statistics	IOWA	OHIO ST
First downs	22	17
Total yards	489	383
Passing yards	333	216
Rushing yards	156	167
Penalties	2–15	6–56
Turnovers	3	3

=== Minnesota ===
Minnesota at Iowa

Team	1	2	3	4	Total
Golden Gophers	3	3	7	7	20
• #18 Hawkeyes	3	21	7	3	34

- Date: November 21
- Location: Kinnick Stadium, Iowa City, Iowa
- Game attendance: 67,700
- Source: Box Score and Game Story

Scoring summary
1		Minn	Chip Lohmiller 32-yard field goal	Minn 3-0
1		Iowa	Rob Houghtlin 37-yard field goal	Tied 3-3
2		Minn	Chip Lohmiller 44-yard field goal	Minn 6-3
2		Iowa	Bayless 4-yard run (Houghtlin kick)	Iowa 10-6
2		Iowa	Mike Flagg 15-yard pass from Chuck Hartlieb (Houghtlin kick)	Iowa 17-6
2		Iowa	Early 34-yard pass from Chuck Hartlieb (Houghtlin kick)	Iowa 24-6
3		Minn	Gaiters 5-yard pass from Foggie (Lohmiller kick)	Iowa 24-13
3		Iowa	Hudson 10-yard run (Houghtlin kick)	Iowa 31-13
3		Minn	Couch 45-yard pass from Foggie (Lohmiller kick)	Iowa 31-20
4	2:01	Iowa	Rob Houghtlin 37-yard field goal	Iowa 34-20

Game statistics	MINN	IOWA
First downs	14	30
Total yards	295	510
Passing yards	216	328
Rushing yards	79	182
Penalties	4–33	7–64
Turnovers	0	2

=== Vs. Wyoming (Holiday Bowl) ===
1987 SeaWorld Holiday Bowl

Team	1	2	3	4	Total
• #18 Hawkeyes	0	7	0	13	20
Cowboys	12	7	0	0	19

- Date: December 30
- Location: Jack Murphy Stadium, San Diego
- Game attendance: 61,892
- Referee: Pat Flood
- TV announcers (ESPN): Jim Kelly and Kevin Kiley

Scoring summary
1	WYO	Worker 43-yard field goal	WYO 3-0
1	WYO	Worker 38-yard field goal	WYO 6-0
1	WYO	Loving 15-yard pass from Burnett (pass failed)	WYO 12-0
2	IOWA	Hess 10-yard blocked punt return (Houghtlin kick)	WYO 12-7
2	WYO	Abraham 3-yard run (Worker kick)	WYO 19-7
4	IOWA	Wright 33-yard interception return (Houghtlin kick)	WYO 19-14
4	IOWA	Hudson 1-yard run (conversion failed)	IOWA 20-19

== Roster ==
1987 Iowa Hawkeyes football team roster
Players
Coaches
Offense

Pos.	#	Name	Class
FB	23	Richard Bass	Jr
RB	13	Rick Bayless	Sr
OL	78	Malcolm Christie	Sr
TE	49	Craig Clark	Sr
TE	84	Marv Cook	Jr
WR	82	Pat Coppinger	Sr
FB	25	Marshall Cotton	Sr
OL	63	Jeff Croston	Jr
OL	58	Greg Divis	Sr
WR	1	Quinn Early	Sr
TE	86	Mike Flagg	Sr
RB	22	Grant Goodman	Jr
WR	80	Steve Green	Sr
WR	16	Deven Harberts	Jr
RB	28	Kevin Harmon	Sr
QB	8	Chuck Hartlieb	Jr
FB	20	David Hudson	Jr
G	70	Bob Kratch	Jr
WR	81	Derrius Loveless	Sr
WR	26	Peter Marciano	Jr
WR	47	Jim Mauro (injured)	Sr
QB	11	Dan McGwire	So
TE	85	John Palmer	Jr
QB	14	Tom Poholsky	So
OL	67	Jim Poynton	Jr
RB	33	Kevin Ringer	Jr
OL	60	Bob Schmitt	Sr
OL	71	Chuck Waggoner	Jr
TE	88	Tom Ward	Sr
WR	2	Travis Watkins	So
OL	73	Herb Wester	Sr

Defense

Pos.	#	Name	Class
DL	68	Tim Anderson	Sr
LB	93	Tim Batterson	Sr
DE	92	Jeff Beard	Sr
DE	48	Tyrone Berrie	Jr
LB	43	Jeff Blake	Sr
DE	5	Mike Burke	Sr
DB	3	Kerry Burt	Sr
DE	83	Mike Ertz	Jr
DL	64	Dave Haight	Jr
DL	54	Eric Higgins	Jr
DB	42	Tork Hook	Jr
DB	19	Carl Jackson	Sr
LB	34	Vernon Little	Jr
DE	97	Joe Mott	Jr
DE	71	Chris Pigott	Jr
LB	35	Brad Quast	So
LB	95	Jim Reilly	Jr
LB	38	Shawon Respress	Jr
DE	91	Sean Ridley	Jr
DL		Joe Schuster	Sr
DB	44	Keaton Smiley	Sr
DB	41	Mark Stoops	Jr
LB	39	Tyrone Taylor	Sr
LB	46	Dan Wirth	Sr
DB	10	Anthony Wright	Jr

Special teams

Pos.	#	Name	Class
K		Mark Adams	Jr
K	6	George Murphy	Jr
K	7	Rob Houghtlin	Sr

Head coach

- Hayden Fry

Coordinators/assistant coaches

- Bill Snyder – Offensive Coordinator/Quarterbacks
- Bill Brashier – Defensive Coordinator
- Kirk Ferentz – Offensive line
- Carl Jackson – Running backs
- Del Miller – Offensive assistant
- Dan McCarney – Defensive line
- Barry Alvarez – Linebackers
- Don Patterson – Defensive Backs
- Bernie Wyatt – Defensive Ends/Recruiting Coordinator
- Bill Dervich – Strength and Conditioning
- Bob Stoops – Volunteer Assistant
- Mike Stoops – Graduate Assistant
- Jay Norvell – Graduate assistant

Legend

- (C) Team captain
- (S) Suspended
- (I) Ineligible
- Injured
- Redshirt

== Statistics ==
Team statistics. On offense, the Hawkeyes gained an average of 296.6 passing yards and 141.2 rushing yards per game. They led the Big Ten with an average of 29.2 points per game. On defense, they gave up an average of 163.0 passing yards and 122.6 rushing yards per game. They ranked fifth in the Big Ten in scoring defense, giving up an average of 19.2 points per game.

Passing. Quarterback Chuck Hartlieb did not start until the third game of the season but finished the season as the top-rated passer in the Big Ten and the No. 3 passer in the country with a 161.4 passer rating. He completed 196 of 299 passes (65.6%) for 2,855 yards, 19 touchdowns, and eight interceptions.

Rushing. Running back Kevin Harmon led the team with 668 rushing yads on 139 carries (4.8 yards per carry) and six rushing touchdowns. David Hudson ranked second with 421 rushing yards on 103 carries (4.1 yards per carry) and five rushing touchdowns. Hartlieb tied a Big Ten record with seven touchdown passes against Northwestern and tied an NCAA record with four touchdown passes in a quarter in the same game.

Receiving. Wide receiver Quinn Early led the team with 61 receptions for 978 yards and 10 touchdowns. Early set a Big Ten record with a 95-yard touchdown reception against Northwestern. Early also handled punting for the team, averaging 34.7 yards per kick.

Tight end Marv Cook ranked second with 43 receptions for 760 yards. He caught the game-winning touchdown pass in the closing seconds in Iowa's first win over Ohio State in Columbus since 1959. Cook was also the team's regular punter and led the team with 30 tackles on special teams.

Scoring. Kicker Rob Houghtlin led the Big Ten in scoring for the third year in a row and ran his streak to 40 consecutive extra points. For the 1987 season, he scored 102 points scored, converting 39 of 39 extra points and 21 of 29 field goals. Quinn Early ranked second with 60 points on 10 touchdowns. Houghtlin concluded his Iowa career in 1987 as the school's all-time scorer with 288 points.

Tackles. Dave Haight led the Big Ten with 119 total tackles and 74 solo tackles. He also had 14 tackles for loss, six quarterback sacks and three fumble recoveries. He set a school record for tackles by a lineman and was the first lineman in school history to lead the team in tackles.

== Awards and honors ==
No Iowa players received honors on the 1987 All-America college football team.

Junior nose guard Dave Haight was selected as the Big Ten Defensive Lineman of the Year.

Iowa's most valuable player award was shared by three redshirt juniors: Haight, quarterback Chuck Hartlieb, and tight end Marv Cook.

Six Iowa players received first-team honors on the 1987 All-Big Ten Conference football team: Haight (AP-1, UPI-1); Hartlieb (AP-1, UPI-1); Cook (AP-1, UPI-1); wide receiver Quinn Early (AP-1, UPI-1); defensive back Kerry Burt (AP-1, UPI-2); and kicker Rob Houghtlin (AP-1, UPI-1).

== 1988 NFL draft ==
Player	Position	Round	Pick	NFL club
Quinn Early	Wide receiver	3	60	San Diego Chargers
Kevin Harmon	Running back	4	101	Seattle Seahawks
Herb Wester	Tackle	5	114	Cincinnati Bengals
Joe Schuster	Defensive tackle	10	261	Philadelphia Eagles
