= 1987 Michigan Wolverines football team =

American college football season

1987 Michigan Wolverines football

Hall of Fame Bowl champion

Hall of Fame Bowl, W 28–24 vs. Alabama
- Conference: Big Ten Conference

Ranking
- Coaches: No. 18
- AP: No. 19
- Record: 8–4 (5–3 Big Ten)
- Head coach: Bo Schembechler (18th season)
- Offensive coordinator: Gary Moeller (1st season)
- Defensive coordinator: Lloyd Carr (1st season)
- MVP: Jamie Morris
- Captains: Doug Mallory; Jamie Morris
- Home stadium: Michigan Stadium

1987 Big Ten Conference football standings
	Conf.					Overall
Team	W		L		T	W		L		T
No. 8 Michigan State $	7	–	0	–	1	9	–	2	–	1
No. 16 Iowa	6	–	2	–	0	10	–	3	–	0
Indiana	6	–	2	–	0	8	–	4	–	0
No. 19 Michigan	5	–	3	–	0	8	–	4	–	0
Ohio State	4	–	4	–	0	6	–	4	–	1
Minnesota	3	–	5	–	0	6	–	5	–	0
Purdue	3	–	5	–	0	3	–	7	–	1
Illinois	2	–	5	–	1	3	–	7	–	1
Northwestern	2	–	6	–	0	2	–	8	–	1
Wisconsin	1	–	7	–	0	3	–	8	–	0
$ – Conference champion; Rankings from AP Poll

The 1987 Michigan Wolverines football team was an American football team that represented the University of Michigan as a member of the Big Ten Conference during the 1987 NCAA Division I-A football season. In its 19th season under head coach Bo Schembechler, the team compiled an 8–4 record (5–3 against conference opponents), defeated Alabama in the Hall of Fame Bowl, outscored opponents by a total of 331 to 172, and was ranked No. 19 and No. 18, respectively, in the final AP and UPI polls.

The team's statistical leaders included quarterback Demetrius Brown with 1,251 passing yards, tailback Jamie Morris with 1,703 rushing yards and 90 points scored, and split end Greg McMurtry with 474 receiving yards.

Two Michigan players received first-team honors on the 1987 All-America college football team: offensive tackle Jumbo Elliott (consensus) and defensive lineman Mark Messner (The Sporting News). Five Michigan players received first-team honors on the 1987 All-Big Ten Conference football team.

== Schedule ==
Date	Time	Opponent	Rank	Site	TV	Result	Attendance	Source
September 12	3:30 p.m.	No. 16 Notre Dame*	No. 9	Michigan Stadium; Ann Arbor, MI (rivalry)	ABC	L 7–26	106,098	
September 19	1:00 p.m.	Washington State*	No. 19	Michigan Stadium; Ann Arbor, MI		W 44–18	103,521	
September 26	1:00 p.m.	Long Beach State*	No. 14	Michigan Stadium; Ann Arbor, MI		W 49–0	101,714	
October 3	1:00 p.m.	Wisconsin	No. 12	Michigan Stadium; Ann Arbor, MI		W 49–0	104,410	
October 10	3:30 p.m.	at Michigan State	No. 12	Spartan Stadium; East Lansing, MI (rivalry)	ABC	L 11–17	77,424	
October 17	12:00 p.m.	Iowa		Michigan Stadium; Ann Arbor, MI	ABC	W 37–10	105,406	
October 24	2:30 p.m.	at No. 15 Indiana	No. 20	Memorial Stadium; Bloomington, IN		L 10–14	51,240	
October 31	1:00 p.m.	Northwestern^{†}		Michigan Stadium; Ann Arbor, MI (rivalry)		W 29–6	104,101	
November 7	3:30 p.m.	at Minnesota		Hubert H. Humphrey Metrodome; Minneapolis, MN (Little Brown Jug)	ABC	W 30–20	55,481	
November 14	12:30 p.m.	at Illinois		Memorial Stadium; Champaign, IL (rivalry)	ABC	W 17–14	64,496	
November 21	12:00 p.m.	Ohio State		Michigan Stadium; Ann Arbor, MI (The Game)	ABC	L 20–23	106,031	
January 2, 1988	1:00 p.m.	vs. Alabama*		Tampa Stadium; Tampa, FL (Hall of Fame Bowl)	NBC	W 28–24	60,156	
*Non-conference game; ^{†}Homecoming; Rankings from AP Poll released prior to the game; All times are in Eastern time

== Game summaries ==
=== Washington State ===
Team	1	2	3	4	Total
Washington St	7	3	0	8	18
• Michigan	7	6	24	7	44

- Date: September 19
- Location: Michigan Stadium, Ann Arbor, Michigan
- Game attendance: 103,521

Scoring summary
Q1	MICH	Kolesar 25 yard pass from D. Brown (Gillette kick)	MICH 7–0
Q1	WSU	Leighton 20 yard pass from Rosenbach (Adams kick)	Tie 7–7
Q2	WSU	Adams 30 yard field goal	WSU 10–7
Q2	MICH	Gillette 36 yard field goal	Tie 10–10
Q2	MICH	Gillette 48 yard field goal	MICH 13–10
Q3	MICH	Morris 2 yard run (Gillette kick)	MICH 20–10
Q3	MICH	Gillette 32 yard field goal	MICH 23–10
Q3	MICH	D. Brown 12 yard run (Gillette kick)	MICH 30–10
Q3	MICH	Morris 1 yard run (Gillette kick)	MICH 37–10
Q4	WSU	Wood 33 yard pass from Rosenbach (Calvin run)	MICH 37–18
Q4	MICH	Jefferson 70 yard run (Gillette kick)	MICH 44–18

=== Wisconsin ===
Team	1	2	3	4	Total
Wisconsin	0	0	0	0	0
• Michigan	21	21	7	0	49

- Date: October 3
- Location: Michigan Stadium, Ann Arbor, Michigan
- Game attendance: 104,410

Scoring summary
1	Michigan	Jefferson 1-yard run (Gillette kick)	Michigan 7-0
1	Michigan	D. Brown 14-yard run (Gillette kick)	Michigan 14-0
1	Michigan	Morris 35-yard run (Gillette kick)	Michigan 21-0
2	Michigan	Morris 13-yard run (Gillette kick)	Michigan 28-0
2	Michigan	Morris 1-yard run (Gillette kick)	Michigan 35-0
2	Michigan	D. Walker 7-yard pass from Taylor (Gillette kick)	Michigan 42-0
3	Michigan	D. Brown 1-yard run (Gillette kick)	Michigan 49-0

=== Iowa ===
Iowa at Michigan

Team	1	2	3	4	Total
Hawkeyes	0	10	0	0	10
• Wolverines	6	24	0	7	37

- Date: October 17
- Location: Michigan Stadium, Ann Arbor, Michigan
- Game attendance: 105,406

Scoring summary
1	Mich	D. Brown 1-yard run (kick failed)	Mich 6-0
2	Mich	Gillette 42-yard field goal	Mich 9-0
2	Mich	Kolesar 35-yard pass from Brown (Gillette kick)	Mich 16-0
2	IOWA	Clark 6-yard pass from Hartlieb (Houghtlin kick)	Mich 16-7
2	Mich	McMurtry 12-yard pass from Brown (Gillette kick)	Mich 23-7
2	IOWA	Houghtlin 46-yard field goal	Mich 23-10
2	Mich	McMurtry 12-yard pass from Brown (Gillette kick)	Mich 30-10
4	Mich	Morris 3-yard run (Gillette kick)	Mich 37-10

=== Northwestern ===
Northwestern Wildcats at Michigan Wolverines

Quarter	1	2	3	4	Total
Northwestern	0	0	0	6	6
Michigan	0	12	3	14	29

at Michigan Stadium • Ann Arbor, Michigan

- Date: October 31
- Game attendance: 104,101
- TV: ABC

Game information
- MICH - Gillette 28 yard field goal
- MICH - Gillette 22 yard field goal
- MICH - Taylor 1 yard run (pass failed)
- MICH - Gillette 43 yard field goal
- MICH - Taylor 65 yard run (Gillette kick)
- NW - Greenfield 1 yard run (pass failed)
- MICH - Morris 74 yard run (Gillette kick)

=== At Minnesota ===
Little Brown Jug: Michigan Wolverines at Minnesota Golden Gophers

Quarter	1	2	3	4	Total
Michigan	7	0	16	7	30
Minnesota	10	7	0	3	20

at Hubert H. Humphrey Metrodome

- Date: November 7
- Game weather: Indoors (dome)
- Game attendance: 55,481

Game information

- MINN - Lohmiller 38 yard field goal
- MINN - Thompson 1 yard run (Lohmiller kick)
- MICH - McMurtry 62 yard pass from D. Brown (Gillette kick)
- MINN - Thompson 98 yard run (Lohmiller kick)
- MICH - Morris 9 yard run (pass good)
- MICH - Hoard 1 yard run (pass good)
- MINN - Lohmiller 49 yard field goal
- MICH - Calloway 36 yard pass from D. Brown (Gillette kick)

Michigan

- D. Brown 7/15, 146 Yds, 2 TD, 2 INT
- Morris 29 Rush, 149 Yds, TD
- McMurtry 3 Rec, 97 Yds, TD

Minnesota

- Foggie 12/23, 160 Yds
- Thompson 21 Rush, 201 Yds, 2 TD
- Bruce 3 Rec, 51 Yds

=== Ohio State ===
Ohio State Buckeyes (5–4–1) at Michigan Wolverines

Quarter	1	2	3	4	Total
Ohio St	0	7	13	3	23
Michigan	7	6	7	0	20

at Michigan Stadium, Ann Arbor, Michigan

- Date: November 21, 1987
- Game time: 12:00 p.m.
- Game weather: Cloudy, low 30s
- Game attendance: 106,031
- TV: ABC

Game information

First quarter

- MICH – Jamie Morris 1-yard run (Mike Gillette kick), 10:02. Michigan 7–0. Drive: 7 plays, 73 yards, 2:43.

Second quarter

- MICH – Mike Gillette 34-yard field goal, 14:57. Michigan 10–0. Drive: 10 plays, 55 yards, 4:13.
- MICH – Mike Gillette 19-yard field goal, 7:05. Michigan 13–0. Drive: 13 plays, 53 yards, 5:49.
- OSU – Everett Ross 61-yard pass from Tom Tupa (Matt Frantz kick), 1:36. Michigan 13–7. Drive: 10 plays, 61 yards, 4:08.

Third quarter

- OSU – Carlos Snow 70-yard pass from Tom Tupa (Matt Frantz kick), 12:32. Ohio St 14–13. Drive: 1 play, 70 yards, 0:12.
- OSU – Tom Tupa 1-yard run (kick failed), 7:11. Ohio St 20–13. Drive: 3 plays, 19 yards, 1:05.
- MICH – Leroy Hoard 10-yard run (Mike Gillette kick), 1:14. Tie 20–20. Drive: 6 plays, 46 yards, 2:00.

Fourth quarter

- OSU – Matt Frantz 26-yard field goal, 5:18. Ohio St 23–20. Drive: 15 plays, 77 yards.

Top passers

- OSU – Tom Tupa – 18/26, 219 yards, 2 TD
- MICH – Demetrius Brown – 5/13, 79 yards, INT

Top rushers

- OSU – Carlos Snow – 21 rushes, 67 yards
- MICH – Jamie Morris – 23 rushes, 130 yards, TD

Top receivers

- OSU – Carlos Snow – 3 receptions, 82 yards, TD
- MICH – Jerod Bunch – 1 reception, 39 yards

=== Vs. Alabama (Hall of Fame Bowl) ===
- Jamie Morris 23 Rush, 234 Yds

== Players ==
=== Roster ===
1987 Michigan Wolverines football team roster
Players
Coaches
Offense

Pos.	#	Name	Class
WR	29	Geoffrey Bissell	Sr
RB	46	Tony Boles	So
C		Andrew Borowski	Fr
QB	6	Demetrius Brown	Jr
TE	80	Jeffrey Brown	Jr
RB	32	Jarrod Bunch	So
WR	2	Chris Calloway	So
TE	82	Bob Cernak	Sr
G	64	Dave Chester	Sr
G	76	Michael Dames	Sr
OT	63	Doug Daugherty	So
G	57	Dave Dever	Sr
G	78	Dean Dingman	Fr
OT	73	Tom Dohring	So
OT	72	Jumbo Elliott	Sr
OT	70	Mark Erhardt	Sr
WR	45	J. Patrick Fitzgerald	Sr
RB	33	Leroy Hoard	So
OT	74	Mike Husar	Sr
RB	28	Allen Jefferson	So
WR	40	John Kolesar	Jr
TE	97	Dave Mandel	Sr
TE	88	Scott Mandel	Sr
WR	1	Greg McMurtry	So
TE	90	Keith Mitchell	Jr
RB	23	Jamie Morris	Sr
C/G	62	Marc Ramirez	Sr
DB	33	Marcus Martin	Fr
OT	75	Greg Skrepenak	Fr
QB	9	Michael Taylor	Jr
C	67	John Vitale	Sr
TE	89	Derrick Walker	Jr
RB	46	Phil Webb	Sr
G	50	David Weil	Jr
WR	3	Tripp Welborne	Fr

Defense

Pos.	#	Name	Class
DB	24	Bobby Abrams	Jr
DB	15	David Arnold	Jr
DB	{{{num}}}	Allen Bishop	Sr
DB	33	Marcus Martin	Fr
DB	12	Ernest F. Bock	Sr
LB	99	Carlitos Bostic	Sr
DB	5	Erik Campbell	Sr
LB	92	Keith Cooper	Jr
LB	51	John Duerr	Sr
DT	93	Dave Folkertsma	Sr
LB	95	J. J. Grant	Jr
DB	9	Mark Gutzwiller	Jr
MG	56	Billy Harris
DB	25	Rick Hassel	Jr
DB	19	Scott Herrala	Jr
DT	96	John Herrmann	Sr
LB	97	Joseph H. Holland	Jr
DB	26	David Key	So
DB	34	Sean Lafountaine	So
DB	15	Don Lessner	Sr
SS	8	Doug Mallory	Sr
DT	79	Warde Manuel	Sr
LB	54	Andree McIntyre	Sr
DT	60	Mark Messner	Sr
LB	30	John Milligan	So
DB	20	Anthony Mitchell	Jr
DB	27	Vada Murray	So
DT	94	T. J. Osman	So
LB	65	Cornelius Simpson	Fr
LB	44	Bob Stites	Sr
LB	53	Rick Stites	Sr
MG	91	Mike Teeter	Sr
LB	86	Steven Thibert	Sr
DT	88	Brent White	Jr
LB	85	Timothy Williams	So
LB	39	John Willingham	Sr

Special teams

Pos.	#	Name	Class
K	19	Mike Gillette	Jr
P	43	Monte Robbins	Sr
K	9	Rick Stukiewicz	Sr

Head coach

- Bo Schembechler

Coordinators/assistant coaches

Legend

- (C) Team captain
- (S) Suspended
- (I) Ineligible
- Injured
- Redshirt

=== Offense ===
- Geoffrey Bissell, wide receiver, senior, West Bloomfield, Michigan
- Tony Boles, running back, sophomore, Westland, Michigan
- Andrew Borowski, center, Cincinnati, Ohio
- Demetrius Brown, quarterback, junior, Miami, Florida - started 10 games at quarterback
- Jeffrey Brown, tight end, junior, Shaker Heights, Ohio - started all 12 games at tight end
- Jarrod Bunch, running back, sophomore, Ashtabula, Ohio - started 9 games at fullback
- Chris Calloway, wide receiver, sophomore, Chicago, Illinois - started 5 games at flanker
- Bob Cernak, tight end, senior, Lockport, Illinois
- Dave Chester, offensive guard, senior, Titusville, Florida - started 6 games at left offensive guard
- Michael Dames, offensive guard, senior, Miami, Florida - started 6 games at left offensive guard
- Doug Daugherty, offensive tackle, sophomore, Romeo, Michigan
- Dave Dever, offensive guard, senior, Midland, Michigan
- Dean Dingman, offensive guard, freshman, East Troy, Wisconsin
- Tom Dohring, offensive tackle, sophomore, Dearborn, Michigan - started 6 games at left offensive tackle
- Jumbo Elliott, offensive tackle, senior, Lake Ronkonkoma, New York - started all 12 games at right offensive tackle
- Mark Erhardt, offensive tackle, senior, North Olmsted, Ohio
- J. Patrick Fitzgerald, wide receiver, senior, Vandalia, Ohio
- Leroy Hoard, fullback, sophomore, New Orleans, Louisiana - started 1 game at fullback
- Mike Husar, offensive tackle, senior, Chicago, Illinois - started 6 games at left offensive tackle
- Allen Jefferson, tailback, sophomore, Detroit, Michigan
- John Kolesar, flanker, junior, Westlake, Ohio - started 7 games at flanker
- Dave Mandel, tight end, senior, Ann Arbor, Michigan
- Scott Mandel, tight end, senior, Ann Arbor, Michigan
- Greg McMurtry, split end, sophomore, Brockton, Massachusetts - started all 12 games at split end
- Keith Mitchell, tight end, junior, Southgate, Michigan
- Jamie Morris, tailback, senior, Ayer, Massachusetts - started all 12 games at tailback
- Marc Ramirez, center/guard, senior, Prairie View, Illinois
- Greg Skrepenak, offensive tackle, freshman, Wilkes Barre, Pennsylvania
- Michael Taylor, quarterback, junior, Lincoln Heights, Ohio - started 2 games at quarterback
- John Vitale, center, senior, Detroit, Michigan - started all 12 games at center
- Derrick Walker, tight end, junior, Glenwood, Illinois
- Phil Webb, running back, senior, Romeo, Michigan - started 2 games at fullback
- David Weil, offensive guard, junior, Cincinnati, Ohio
- Tripp Welborne, wide receiver, freshman, Greensboro, North Carolina

=== Defense ===
- Bobby Abrams, defensive back, junior, Detroit, Michigan - started 7 games at outside linebacker, 2 games at inside linebacker
- David Arnold, defensive back, junior, Warren, Ohio - started 9 games at cornerback
- Allen Bishop, defensive back, senior, Miami, Florida - started 8 games at cornerback
- Ernest F. Bock, defensive back, senior, Northville, Michigan
- Carlitos Bostic, outside linebacker, senior, Ypsilanti, Michigan
- Erik Campbell, defensive back, senior, Gary, Indiana - started all 12 games (7 at cornerback, 5 at free safety)
- Keith Cooper, outside linebacker, junior, Detroit, Michigan - started 4 games at outside linebacker, 3 games at inside linebacker
- John Duerr, outside linebacker, senior, Dearborn, Michigan
- Dave Folkertsma, defensive tackle, senior, Grand Rapids, Michigan
- J. J. Grant, inside linebacker, junior, Liverpool, New York - started 7 games at inside linebacker
- Mark Gutzwiller, defensive back, junior, Ann Arbor, Michigan
- Billy Harris, middle guard, Xenia, Ohio - started 10 games at middle guard
- Rick Hassel, defensive back, junior, Cincinnati, Ohio
- Scott Herrala, defensive back, junior, Muskegon, Michigan
- John Herrmann, defensive tackle, junior, Sussex, Wisconsin - started all 12 games at defensive tackle
- Joseph H. Holland, outside linebacker, junior, Birmingham, Michigan
- David Key, defensive back, sophomore, Columbus, Ohio
- Sean Lafountaine, defensive back, sophomore, Hanover Park, Illinois
- Don Lessner, defensive back, senior, Trenton, Michigan
- Doug Mallory, strong safety, senior, DeKalb, Illinois - started all 12 games at strong safety
- Warde Manuel, defensive tackle, sophomore, New Orleans, Louisiana - started 5 games at outside linebacker
- Andree McIntyre, inside linebacker, senior, Chicago, Illinois - started 3 games at inside linebacker
- Mark Messner, defensive tackle, senior, Hartland, Michigan - started all 12 games at defensive tackle
- John Milligan, linebacker, sophomore, Trenton, Michigan - started 5 games at inside linebacker
- Anthony Mitchell, defensive back, junior, Titusville, Florida - started 7 games at free safety
- Vada Murray, defensive back, sophomore, Cincinnati, Ohio
- T. J. Osman, defensive tackle, sophomore, Pittsburgh, Pennsylvania - started 2 games at middle guard
- Cornelius Simpson, linebacker, freshman, Highland Park, Michigan - started 4 games at inside linebacker
- Bob Stites, inside linebacker, senior, Ann Arbor, Michigan
- Rick Stites, inside linebacker, senior, Ann Arbor, Michigan
- Mike Teeter, middle guard, sophomore, Fruitport, Michigan
- Steven Thibert, outside linebacker, senior, Union Lake, Michigan - started 2 games at outside linebacker
- Brent White, defensive tackle, junior, Dayton, Ohio
- Timothy Williams, linebacker, sophomore, Milwaukee, Wisconsin - started 1 game at inside linebacker
- John Willingham, outside linebacker, senior, Dayton, Ohio - started 5 games at outside linebacker

=== Kickers ===
- Mike Gillette, place-kicker, junior, St. Joseph, Michigan
- Monte Robbins, punter, senior, Great Bend, Kansas
- Rick Stukiewicz, place-kicker, senior, Troy, Michigan

=== Awards and honors ===
- Captains: Jamie Morris, Doug Mallory
- All-Americans: Jumbo Elliott, Mark Messner
- All-Conference: Mark Messner, John Elliott, Jamie Morris, John Vitale, Mike Husar
- Most Valuable Player: Jamie Morris
- Meyer Morton Award: Jamie Morris
- John Maulbetsch Award: Tim Williams
- Frederick Matthei Award: Derrick Walker
- Arthur Robinson Scholarship Award: Dave Mandel
- Dick Katcher Award: Mark Messner
- Hugh Rader Jr. Award: John "Jumbo" Elliott
- Robert P. Ufer Award: Jamie Morris

== Coaching staff ==
- Head coach: Bo Schembechler
- Assistant coaches: Alex Agase, Tirrel Burton, Cam Cameron, Lloyd Carr, Jerry Hanlon, Bill Harris, Jerry Meter, Les Miles, Gary Moeller, Tom Reed
- Trainer: Russ Miller
- Manager: Aaron Studwell (senior manager), Scott Boyle, Patrick Perkins, Bob McArdle
