= 1987 Wisconsin Badgers football team =

American college football season

1987 Wisconsin Badgers football
- Conference: Big Ten Conference
- Record: 3–8 (1–7 Big Ten)
- Head coach: Don Morton (1st season)
- Offensive coordinator: Pat Simmers (1st season)
- Offensive scheme: Veer
- Defensive coordinator: Mike Daly (1st season)
- Base defense: 4–4
- MVP: Paul Gruber
- Captains: Paul Gruber; Rodney Lossow
- Home stadium: Camp Randall Stadium

1987 Big Ten Conference football standings
	Conf.					Overall
Team	W		L		T	W		L		T
No. 8 Michigan State $	7	–	0	–	1	9	–	2	–	1
No. 16 Iowa	6	–	2	–	0	10	–	3	–	0
Indiana	6	–	2	–	0	8	–	4	–	0
No. 19 Michigan	5	–	3	–	0	8	–	4	–	0
Ohio State	4	–	4	–	0	6	–	4	–	1
Minnesota	3	–	5	–	0	6	–	5	–	0
Purdue	3	–	5	–	0	3	–	7	–	1
Illinois	2	–	5	–	1	3	–	7	–	1
Northwestern	2	–	6	–	0	2	–	8	–	1
Wisconsin	1	–	7	–	0	3	–	8	–	0
$ – Conference champion; Rankings from AP Poll

The 1987 Wisconsin Badgers football team represented the University of Wisconsin–Madison as a member of the Big Ten Conference during the 1987 NCAA Division I-A football season. Led by first-year head coach Don Morton, the Badgers compiled an overall record of 3–8 with a mark of 1–7 in conference play, placing last out of ten teams in the Big Ten. Wisconsin played home games at Camp Randall Stadium in Madison, Wisconsin.

== Schedule ==
Date	Opponent	Site	Result	Attendance	Source
September 12	Hawaii*	Camp Randall Stadium; Madison, WI	W 28–7	53,509	
September 19	Utah*	Camp Randall Stadium; Madison, WI	L 28–31	56,224	
September 26	Ball State*	Camp Randall Stadium; Madison, WI	W 30–13	51,825	
October 3	at No. 12 Michigan	Michigan Stadium; Ann Arbor, MI	L 0–49	104,410	
October 10	Iowa	Camp Randall Stadium; Madison, WI (rivalry)	L 10–31	74,645	
October 17	at Illinois	Memorial Stadium; Champaign, IL	L 14–16	57,040	
October 24	Northwestern^{†}	Camp Randall Stadium; Madison, WI	L 24–27	70,012	
October 31	at Purdue	Ross–Ade Stadium; West Lafayette, IN	L 14–49	60,267	
November 7	Ohio State	Camp Randall Stadium; Madison, WI	W 26–24	63,195	
November 14	at Minnesota	Hubert H. Humphrey Metrodome; Minneapolis, MN (rivalry)	L 19–22	62,412	
November 21	No. 11 Michigan State	Camp Randall Stadium; Madison, WI	L 9–30	45,385	
*Non-conference game; ^{†}Homecoming; Rankings from AP Poll released prior to the game

== Roster ==
1987 Wisconsin Badgers football team roster
Players
Coaches
Offense

Pos.	#	Name	Class
TE	88	Brian Anderson	Jr
RB	34	Marvin Artley	Jr
WR	39	Scott Bestor	Jr
WR	3	David Burks	Jr
QB	9	Paul Chryst	Jr
G	79	Glenn Derby	Sr
QB	1	Otis Flowers	Fr
RB	31	Eric Ford	So
G	62	Paul Gruber (C)	Sr
WR	84	John Horneck	Sr
TE	87	Daniel Howell	Jr
RB	32	Leon Hunt	Jr
TE	14	Brant Kennedy	Sr
QB	12	Bud Keyes	Sr
C	61	Rodney Lossow (C)	Sr
QB	6	Tony Lowery	Fr
OT	56	Milan Momcilovic	Sr
OT	75	Todd Nelson	Jr
OL	54	Tim Otto	So
RB	29	Fred Owens	So
OT	71	Keith Peterson	Sr
WR	26	James Ross	Jr
C	58	Steve Rux	Sr
RB	22	Steve Vinci	Jr
WR	86	Bill Williams, Jr	So

Defense

Pos.	#	Name	Class
NG	92	Bill Antonie	Jr
NG	74	John Banaszak	Jr
DT	94	Dan Batsch	Fr
LB	24	Mike Brekke	Sr
DT	59	Jerome Cunningham	So
DT	91	Don Davey	Fr
LB	49	Victor Fortino	Jr
DT	61	Sam Gerrits	Fr
LB	30	Andy Hartlieb	Jr
DT	81	Craig Hudson	Jr
DT	65	Leon Johnson	So
LB	41	Scott Johnson	Jr
LB	45	Dan Kissling	So
LB	93	Tim Knoeck	Jr
CB	37	Brad Mayo	So
LB	46	Robert Newell	Fr
S	8	Pete Nowka	Jr
LB	19	Paul Partington	Jr
NT	51	Jeff Stein	Sr
LB	90	Aaron Swopes	Sr
CB	27	Greg Thomas	Fr
LB	45	Pete Underwood	Fr
DT	61	Chad Vande Zande	Jr
S	10	Jeff Wagner	Jr
CB	21	LaMarr White	Fr
CB	4	Robert Williams	Sr
LB	48	David Wings	Jr
DT	72	Jeff Wolf	Jr

Special teams

Pos.	#	Name	Class
P	18	Scott Cepicky	Sr
K	5	Todd Gregoire	Sr

Head coach

- Don Morton

Coordinators/assistant coaches

- Pat Simmers – Offensive Coordinator/Offensive Line
- Mike Daly – Defensive Coordinator/Defensive Backs
- Craig Bohl – Inside Linebackers
- Ken Ellett – Offensive Line
- Phil Engle – Defensive Line
- Jimmy Gonzales – Defensive Line
- Mark Mauer – Tight Ends/Wide Receivers
- Scott Seeliger – Quarterbacks/Running Backs
- Lovie Smith – Invert Linebackers
- Jerry Fishbain – Recruiting Coordinator
- Mario Russo – Administrative Assistant

Legend

- (C) Team captain
- (S) Suspended
- (I) Ineligible
- Injured
- Redshirt

== 1988 NFL draft ==
Player	Position	Round	Pick	NFL club
Paul Gruber	Offensive tackle	1	4	Tampa Bay Buccaneers
Glenn Derby	Guard	8	218	New Orleans Saints
Bud Keyes	Quarterback	10	256	Green Bay Packers
Rodney Lossow	Center	10	267	New England Patriots
