= 1987 Northwestern Wildcats football team =

American college football season

1987 Northwestern Wildcats football
- Conference: Big Ten Conference
- Record: 2–8–1 (2–6 Big Ten)
- Head coach: Francis Peay (2nd season)
- Defensive coordinator: Bob Junko (2nd season)
- Captain: Game captains
- Home stadium: Dyche Stadium

1987 Big Ten Conference football standings
	Conf.					Overall
Team	W		L		T	W		L		T
No. 8 Michigan State $	7	–	0	–	1	9	–	2	–	1
No. 16 Iowa	6	–	2	–	0	10	–	3	–	0
Indiana	6	–	2	–	0	8	–	4	–	0
No. 19 Michigan	5	–	3	–	0	8	–	4	–	0
Ohio State	4	–	4	–	0	6	–	4	–	1
Minnesota	3	–	5	–	0	6	–	5	–	0
Purdue	3	–	5	–	0	3	–	7	–	1
Illinois	2	–	5	–	1	3	–	7	–	1
Northwestern	2	–	6	–	0	2	–	8	–	1
Wisconsin	1	–	7	–	0	3	–	8	–	0
$ – Conference champion; Rankings from AP Poll

The 1987 Northwestern Wildcats team represented Northwestern University during the 1987 NCAA Division I-A football season. In their second year under head coach Francis Peay, the Wildcats compiled a 2–8–1 record (2–6 against Big Ten Conference opponents) and finished in ninth place in the Big Ten Conference.

The team's offensive leaders were quarterback Mike Greenfield with 1,265 passing yards, Byron Sanders with 778 rushing yards, and George Jones with 668 receiving yards.

== Schedule ==
Date	Time	Opponent	Site	TV	Result	Attendance	Source
September 12		at Duke*	Wallace Wade Stadium; Durham, NC		L 16–31	19,600	
September 19		at Missouri*	Faurot Field; Columbia, MO		L 3–28	36,549	
September 26	1:00 p.m.	Northern Illinois*	Dyche Stadium; Evanston, IL		T 16–16	27,336	
October 3		at Indiana	Memorial Stadium; Bloomington, IN		L 18–35	38,553	
October 10	11:30 a.m.	Minnesota	Dyche Stadium; Evanston, IL	Raycom	L 33–45	22,104	
October 17	1:05 p.m.	No. 19 Michigan State	Dyche Stadium; Evanston, IL		L 0–38	29,113	
October 24		at Wisconsin	Camp Randall Stadium; Madison, WI		W 27–24	70,012	
October 31	12:00 p.m.	at Michigan	Michigan Stadium; Ann Arbor, MI (rivalry)		L 6–29	104,101	
November 7		Iowa	Dyche Stadium; Evanston, IL		L 24–52	38,694	
November 14		at Purdue	Ross–Ade Stadium; West Lafayette, IN		L 15–20	50,468	
November 21		Illinois	Dyche Stadium; Evanston, IL (rivalry)		W 28–10	27,104	
*Non-conference game; Rankings from AP Poll released prior to the game; All times are in Central time

== Personnel ==
1987 Northwestern Wildcats football team roster
Players
Coaches
Offense

Pos.	#	Name	Class
QB		Greg Bradshaw
RB		Stanley Davenport
TE		Bob Driscoll
QB		Mike Greenfield
WR		Marcus Lang
RB		Torrio Osborne
RB		Byron Sanders
RB		Curtis Spears

Defense

Pos.	#	Name	Class

Special teams

Pos.	#	Name	Class

Head coach

- Francis Peay

Coordinators/assistant coaches

Legend

- (C) Team captain
- (S) Suspended
- (I) Ineligible
- Injured
- Redshirt
