= 1987 Illinois Fighting Illini football team =

American college football season

1987 Illinois Fighting Illini football
- Conference: Big Ten Conference
- Record: 3–7–1 (2–5–1 Big Ten)
- Head coach: Mike White (8th season)
- Offensive coordinator: Dwain Painter (1st season)
- Defensive coordinator: Howard Tippett (1st season)
- MVP: Darryl Usher
- Captains: Mike Scully; Mike Piel; Darrick Brownlow
- Home stadium: Memorial Stadium

1987 Big Ten Conference football standings
	Conf.					Overall
Team	W		L		T	W		L		T
No. 8 Michigan State $	7	–	0	–	1	9	–	2	–	1
No. 16 Iowa	6	–	2	–	0	10	–	3	–	0
Indiana	6	–	2	–	0	8	–	4	–	0
No. 19 Michigan	5	–	3	–	0	8	–	4	–	0
Ohio State	4	–	4	–	0	6	–	4	–	1
Minnesota	3	–	5	–	0	6	–	5	–	0
Purdue	3	–	5	–	0	3	–	7	–	1
Illinois	2	–	5	–	1	3	–	7	–	1
Northwestern	2	–	6	–	0	2	–	8	–	1
Wisconsin	1	–	7	–	0	3	–	8	–	0
$ – Conference champion; Rankings from AP Poll

The 1987 Illinois Fighting Illini football team was an American football team that represented the University of Illinois at Urbana-Champaign as a member of the Big Ten Conference during the 1987 NCAA Division I-A football season. In their eighth and final year under head coach Mike White, the Fighting Illini compiled a 3–7–1 record (2–5–1 in conference games), finished in eighth place in the Big Ten, and were outscored by a total of 208 to 153.

The team's statistical leaders included quarterback Scott Mohr (1,436 passing yards, 50.0% completion percentage), running back Keith Jones (322 rushing yards, 2.9 yards per carry), wide receiver Darryl Usher (43 receptions for 723 yards), and kicker Doug Higgins (36 points, 12 of 14 extra points, 8 of 13 field goals). Defensive end Scott Davis received first-team honors on the 1987 All-Big Ten Conference football team.

The team played its home games at Memorial Stadium in Champaign, Illinois.

== Schedule ==
Date	Opponent	Site	Result	Attendance	Source
September 5	at North Carolina*	Kenan Memorial Stadium; Chapel Hill, NC	L 14–34	40,000	
September 12	No. 15 Arizona State*	Memorial Stadium; Champaign, IL	L 7–21	70,060	
September 19	East Carolina*	Memorial Stadium; Champaign, IL	W 20–10	62,045	
October 3	No. 9 Ohio State	Memorial Stadium; Champaign, IL (Illibuck)	L 6–10	73,045	
October 10	at Purdue	Ross–Ade Stadium; West Lafayette, IN (rivalry)	L 3–9	59,483	
October 17	Wisconsin	Memorial Stadium; Champaign, IL	W 16–14	57,040	
October 24	at No. 14 Michigan State	Spartan Stadium; East Lansing, MI	T 14–14	76,513	
October 31	Minnesota	Memorial Stadium; Champaign, IL	W 27–17	60,143	
November 7	at No. 18 Indiana	Memorial Stadium; Bloomington, IN (rivalry)	L 22–34	50,026	
November 14	Michigan	Memorial Stadium; Champaign, IL (rivalry)	L 14–17	64,496	
November 21	at Northwestern	Dyche Stadium; Evanston, IL (rivalry)	L 10–28	27,104	
*Non-conference game; Rankings from AP Poll released prior to the game

== Roster ==
1987 Illinois Fighting Illini football team roster
Players
Coaches
Offense

Pos.	#	Name	Class
WR	2	Mike Bellamy	Jr
RB	29	Howard Griffith	Fr
TE	82	Frank Hartley	So
C	66	Dave Harbour	Sr
RB	36	Keith Jones	Jr
FB	44	Jeff Markland	Sr
QB	12	Brian Menkhausen	So
TE	80	Chris Michel	Jr
QB	14	Scott Mohr	Jr
QB	10	Chris Ondrula	Fr
WR	83	Gus Palma	Fr
FB	20	Quintin Parker	So
OT	78	Ed Pedersen	Fr
RB	23	Luke Petraitis	So
OT	70	Tom Schertz	Sr
OT	68	Craig Schneider	So
C	55	Mike Scully	Sr
C	53	Tim Scully	Fr

Defense

Pos.	#	Name	Class
DT	96	Mel Agee	Fr
LB	48	Darrick Brownlow	Fr
DE	90	Scott Davis	Sr
DT	95	Moe Gardner	Fr
LB	57	Jason Guard	So
NT	94	Jon Gustafson	Fr
DB	25	Jerry Hamner	Fr
DE	75	Mike Piel	Sr

Special teams

Pos.	#	Name	Class

Head coach

- Mike White

Coordinators/assistant coaches

- Kevin Cosgrove – Linebackers

Legend

- (C) Team captain
- (S) Suspended
- (I) Ineligible
- Injured
- Redshirt

Roster
