= 1987 Minnesota Golden Gophers football team =

American college football season

1987 Minnesota Golden Gophers football
- Conference: Big Ten Conference
- Record: 6–5 (3–5 Big Ten)
- Head coach: John Gutekunst (2nd season)
- Captain: Rickey Foggie
- Home stadium: Hubert H. Humphrey Metrodome

1987 Big Ten Conference football standings
	Conf.					Overall
Team	W		L		T	W		L		T
No. 8 Michigan State $	7	–	0	–	1	9	–	2	–	1
No. 16 Iowa	6	–	2	–	0	10	–	3	–	0
Indiana	6	–	2	–	0	8	–	4	–	0
No. 19 Michigan	5	–	3	–	0	8	–	4	–	0
Ohio State	4	–	4	–	0	6	–	4	–	1
Minnesota	3	–	5	–	0	6	–	5	–	0
Purdue	3	–	5	–	0	3	–	7	–	1
Illinois	2	–	5	–	1	3	–	7	–	1
Northwestern	2	–	6	–	0	2	–	8	–	1
Wisconsin	1	–	7	–	0	3	–	8	–	0
$ – Conference champion; Rankings from AP Poll

The 1987 Minnesota Golden Gophers football team represented the University of Minnesota in the 1987 NCAA Division I-A football season. In their second year under head coach John Gutekunst, the Golden Gophers compiled a 6–5 record and were outscored by their opponents by a combined total of 262 to 257.

Offensive guard Troy Wilkow was named All-Big Ten first team. Offensive lineman Paul Anderson, quarterback Rickey Foggie, tailback Darrell Thompson, kicker Chip Lohmiller and linebacker Jon Leverenz were named All-Big Ten second team. Punter Brent Herbel and offensive lineman Dan Liimatta were named Academic All-Big Ten.

Foggie was awarded the Bronko Nagurski Award. Darrell Thompson was awarded the Bruce Smith Award. Jon Leverenz was awarded the Carl Eller Award. Chip Lohmiller was awarded the Bobby Bell Award. Linebacker Brian Bonner was awarded the Butch Nash Award. Offensive tackle Dan Rechtin was awarded the Paul Giel Award.

Total attendance for the season was 371,809, which averaged out to 55,116 per game. The season high for attendance was against rival Wisconsin.

== Schedule ==
Date	Time	Opponent	Site	TV	Result	Attendance	Source
September 12	7:00 pm	Northern Iowa*	Hubert H. Humphrey Metrodome; Minneapolis, MN	KITN	W 24–7	50,120	
September 19	6:15 pm	California*	Hubert H. Humphrey Metrodome; Minneapolis, MN	KITN	W 32–23	47,322	
September 26	7:00 pm	Central Michigan*	Hubert H. Humphrey Metrodome; Minneapolis, MN		W 30–10	46,868	
October 3	1:00 pm	Purdue	Hubert H. Humphrey Metrodome; Minneapolis, MN		W 21–19	49,376	
October 10	11:30 am	at Northwestern	Dyche Stadium; Evanston, IL	RCM	W 45–33	22,104	
October 16	7:30 pm	No. 20 Indiana^{†}	Hubert H. Humphrey Metrodome; Minneapolis, MN		L 17–18	60,340	
October 24	2:30 pm	at No. 16 Ohio State	Ohio Stadium; Columbus, OH	RCM	L 9–42	89,801	
October 31	1:00 pm	Illinois	Memorial Stadium; Champaign, IL		L 17–27	60,143	
November 7	2:30 pm	Michigan	Hubert H. Humphrey Metrodome; Minneapolis, MN (Little Brown Jug)	ABC	L 20–30	55,481	
November 14	7:00 pm	Wisconsin	Hubert H. Humphrey Metrodome; Minneapolis, MN (rivalry)		W 22–19	62,412	
November 21	1:05 pm	at No. 18 Iowa	Kinnick Stadium; Iowa City, IA (rivalry)		L 20–34	67,700	
*Non-conference game; ^{†}Homecoming; Rankings from AP Poll released prior to the game; All times are in Central time

== Roster ==
1987 Minnesota Golden Gophers football team roster
Players
Coaches
Offense

Pos.	#	Name	Class
G	52	Paul Anderson	Sr
TE	81	Ed Bahr	So
WR	16	Michael Baker	Jr
C	61	Jeff Batta	Jr
QB	8	John Bobinski	So
QB	14	Rickey Foggie (C)	Sr
FB	11	Roselle Richardson	Jr
WR	49	Sam Richter	Jr
QB	15	Scott Schaffner	Fr
OT	64	Shawn Schultz	Jr
OT	70	John Selvestra	Fr
RB	31	Al Settembrino	Fr
OT	65	Jon Melander	So
RB	24	Ed Penn	Jr
G	53	Steve Peterson	Jr
OT	68	Peter Svien	Fr
RB	39	Darrell Thompson	So
WR	86	Pat Tinglehoff	Fr
C	63	Brian Williams	Jr

Defense

Pos.	#	Name	Class
DT	51	Bob Coughlin	Fr
DL	99	Kraig Hackbarth	Fr
DT	68	Gary Hadd	Sr
FS	25	Matt Sheldon	Fr
LB	94	Mac Stephens	So
LB	57	Scott Streiff	So
FS	18	Paul Strong	Jr
LB	66	Bryan Suess	So
DT	79	Mike Sunvold	Fr
LB	96	Kevin Sutton	Fr
LB	92	Alex Svedarsjy	So
DT	77	Trint Trip	Jr
DT	90	Ross Ukkelberg	Jr
CB	22	Craig Welter	So

Special teams

Pos.	#	Name	Class
K	25	Chip Lohmiller	Sr

Head coach

- John Gutekunst

Coordinators/assistant coaches

Legend

- (C) Team captain
- (S) Suspended
- (I) Ineligible
- Injured
- Redshirt

Roster
