= Robert McCallister =

Robert McCallister may refer to a fictional politician:

- Robert McCallister (Brothers & Sisters)

== See also ==
- Robert McAllister (disambiguation)
