= Chuck Hartlieb =

American football player (born 1966)

No. 8
- Position: Quarterback

Personal information
- Born: March 12, 1966 (age 60); Woodstock, Illinois, U.S.
- Listed height: 6 ft 3 in (1.91 m)
- Listed weight: 208 lb (94 kg)

Career information
- College: Iowa
- NFL draft: 1989: 12th round, 325th overall pick

Career history
- Houston Oilers (1989)

Awards and highlights
- 2× First-team All-Big Ten (1987, 1988)

Charles Gregory Hartlieb (born March 12, 1966) is an American former professional football quarterback. He played college football for the Iowa Hawkeyes from 1984 to 1988 and started at that position from 1987 to 1988. He was a high school standout at Marian Central Catholic High School in Woodstock, Illinois, where he was named the 1983 Courier News Player of the Year.

Hartlieb emerged as the Hawkeyes' starting quarterback in 1987, winning the job from Dan McGwire. He passed for 3,092 yards and 19 touchdowns en route to a 9–3 record and a 20–19 victory over Wyoming in the 1987 Holiday Bowl. His seven passing touchdowns against Northwestern remain a school record.

In 1988, Hartlieb set school records for passes attempted (460), completions (288), and yards gained (3,738). Perhaps his greatest performance came on October 29, 1988, against Indiana. Hartlieb completed 44 of 60 pass attempts for 558 yards in a losing effort. The Hawkeyes finished with a record of 6–4–3 and lost to NC State in the 1988 Peach Bowl.

Hartlieb was named First Team All-Big Ten Conference and Academic All-American in 1987 and 1988. He played in the postseason all-star Hula Bowl and the Japan Bowl. He was drafted by the Houston Oilers in the 12th round of the 1989 NFL draft, but did not play in the National Football League (NFL). Hartlieb's brothers, Jim and John, also played football at Iowa.

Hartlieb currently works as a financial planner in Des Moines.
