= 1987 Holiday Bowl =

1987 SeaWorld Holiday Bowl
- 10th Holiday Bowl Game
Iowa Hawkeyes	Wyoming Cowboys
(9–3)	(10–2)
Big Ten	WAC
20	19
Head coach: Hayden Fry	Head coach: Paul Roach
AP / Coaches; 18 / NR
	1	2	3	4	Total
Iowa	0	7	0	13	20
Wyoming	12	7	0	0	19
- Date: December 30, 1987
- Season: 1987
- Stadium: Jack Murphy Stadium
- Location: San Diego, California
- MVP: Offensive: Craig Burnett (Wyoming); Defensive: Anthony Wright (Iowa)
- Referee: Pat Flood (Pac-10)
- Halftime show: Marching bands
- Attendance: 61,892
- Payout: US$771,624 per team

United States TV coverage
- Network: ESPN
- Announcers: Jim Kelly, Kevin Kiley and Sharlene Hawkes

The 1987 Holiday Bowl was a college football bowl game played December 30, 1987, in San Diego, California. It was part of the 1987 NCAA Division I-A football season. It featured the 18th-ranked Iowa Hawkeyes and the 10–2 Wyoming Cowboys.

== Scoring summary ==
Wyoming placekicker Greg Worker kicked field goals of 43 and 38 yards as the Cowboys jumped out to an early 6–0 lead. Quarterback Craig Burnett found James Loving for a 15-yard touchdown, and Wyoming doubled its lead to 12–0 at the end of 1 quarter. In the second quarter, Iowa blocked a punt and ran it back 10 yards for a touchdown, making it 12–7 Wyoming. Wyoming's Gerald Abraham scored on a 3-yard rushing touchdown, to give Wyoming a 19–7 halftime lead.

In the fourth quarter, Iowa's Wright intercepted a Wyoming pass, and returned it 33 yards for a touchdown, cutting the margin to 19–14. David Hudson scored on a 1-yard touchdown run, capping an 86-yard drive. The two-point conversion attempt failed, but Iowa still had a 20–19 lead. They were able to hold on for the win.
