= 1987 Indiana Hoosiers football team =

American college football season

1987 Indiana Hoosiers football

Peach Bowl, L 22–27 vs. Tennessee
- Conference: Big Ten Conference

Ranking
- Coaches: No. 20
- Record: 8–4 (6–2 Big Ten)
- Head coach: Bill Mallory (4th season)
- Defensive coordinator: Joe Novak (4th season)
- MVP: Ernie Jones
- Captains: Tom Polce; Van Waiters
- Home stadium: Memorial Stadium

1987 Big Ten Conference football standings
	Conf.					Overall
Team	W		L		T	W		L		T
No. 8 Michigan State $	7	–	0	–	1	9	–	2	–	1
No. 16 Iowa	6	–	2	–	0	10	–	3	–	0
Indiana	6	–	2	–	0	8	–	4	–	0
No. 19 Michigan	5	–	3	–	0	8	–	4	–	0
Ohio State	4	–	4	–	0	6	–	4	–	1
Minnesota	3	–	5	–	0	6	–	5	–	0
Purdue	3	–	5	–	0	3	–	7	–	1
Illinois	2	–	5	–	1	3	–	7	–	1
Northwestern	2	–	6	–	0	2	–	8	–	1
Wisconsin	1	–	7	–	0	3	–	8	–	0
$ – Conference champion; Rankings from AP Poll

The 1987 Indiana Hoosiers football team represented Indiana University Bloomington as a member of the Big Ten Conference during the 1987 NCAA Division I-A football season. Led by fourth-year head coach Bill Mallory, the Hoosiers compiled an overall record of 8–4 with a mark of 6–2 in conference play, tying for second place in the Big Ten. The team played home games at Memorial Stadium in Bloomington, Indiana.

In their season opener against Rice, Anthony Thompson rushed for 105 yards and a pair of touchdowns en route to a 35–13 Indiana win. However, in what was the renewal of their rivalry against Kentucky, the Hoosiers lost 34–15 at Lexington. Indiana rebounded from their loss to the Wildcats with a five-game winning streak. After a win over Missouri, Indiana defeated Northwestern to open their conference schedule behind a 170-yard, and two touchdown performance by Thompson. The next week, the Hoosiers traveled to Columbus to play No. 9 Ohio State, and for the first time since 1951 Indiana defeated the Buckeyes in their 31–10 upset victory.

Indiana followed their upset with a win at Minnesota after Chip Lohmiller missed what would have been a game-winning field goal in the final minutes for the Gophers. The Hoosiers then returned to Bloomington where they defeated Michigan for the first time since the 1967 season to move into first place in the Big Ten standings. After their win over the Wolverines, Indiana was ranked No. 11, however they went on to split their final four games with losses against Iowa and Michigan State and victories over Illinois and Purdue and finished the regular season tied for second in conference with an overall record of eight wins and three losses.

In November, the Hoosiers accepted an invitation to play in the Peach Bowl against Tennessee of the Southeastern Conference Against the Volunteers, Indiana fell behind by a score of 21–3. However, the Hoosiers rallied and took a 22–21 lead in the fourth quarter only to fall 27–22 after Tennessee scored a late touchdown.

== Schedule ==
Date	Opponent	Rank	Site	TV	Result	Attendance	Source
September 12	Rice*		Memorial Stadium; Bloomington, IN		W 35–13	38,132	
September 19	at Kentucky*		Commonwealth Stadium; Lexington, KY (rivalry)		L 15–34	57,924	
September 26	Missouri*		Memorial Stadium; Bloomington, IN		W 20–17	41,145	
October 3	Northwestern		Memorial Stadium; Bloomington, IN		W 35–18	38,553	
October 10	at No. 9 Ohio State		Ohio Stadium; Columbus, OH		W 31–10	90,032	
October 16	at Minnesota	No. 20	Hubert H. Humphrey Metrodome; Minneapolis, MN		W 18–17	60,340	
October 24	No. 20 Michigan^{†}	No. 15	Memorial Stadium; Bloomington, IN		W 14–10	51,240	
October 31	at Iowa	No. 11	Kinnick Stadium; Iowa City, IA		L 21–29	67,700	
November 7	Illinois	No. 18	Memorial Stadium; Bloomington, IN (rivalry)		W 34–22	50,026	
November 14	at No. 13 Michigan State	No. 16	Spartan Stadium; East Lansing, MI (rivalry)	ABC	L 3–27	76,411	
November 21	Purdue	No. 20	Memorial Stadium; Bloomington, IN (Old Oaken Bucket)		W 35–14	51,951	
January 2, 1988	vs. No. 17 Tennessee*		Atlanta–Fulton County Stadium; Atlanta, GA (Peach Bowl)	Mizlou	L 22–27	58,737	
*Non-conference game; ^{†}Homecoming; Rankings from AP Poll released prior to the game

== Roster ==
1987 Indiana Hoosiers football team roster
Players
Coaches
Offense

Pos.	#	Name	Class
WR	27	Ernie Jones
G	75	Eric Moore
QB	11	Dave Schnell
RB	32	Anthony Thompson	Jr

Defense

Pos.	#	Name	Class
LB	48	Van Waiters
NG	49	Larry Luther
DT	95	Walt Harris
DT	55	Dan Baure
DT	54	Doug Schlereth
NG	91	Jim Sams
LB	35	Joe Huff

Special teams

Pos.	#	Name	Class
P	12	Dan Stryzinski
K	10	Pete Stoyanovich	Jr

Head coach

- Bill Mallory

Coordinators/assistant coaches

Legend

- (C) Team captain
- (S) Suspended
- (I) Ineligible
- Injured
- Redshirt

== 1988 NFL draftees ==
Player	Position	Round	Pick	NFL club
Eric Moore	Offensive guard	1	10	New York Giants
Van Waiters	Linebacker	3	77	Cleveland Browns
Ernie Jones	Wide receiver	7	179	Phoenix Cardinals
Eric Hickerson	Defensive back	10	259	New York Giants
