= John Miller (safety) =

American football player (born 1966)

No. 44
- Position: Safety

Personal information
- Born: June 22, 1966 (age 60); Detroit, Michigan, U.S.
- Listed height: 6 ft 1 in (1.85 m)
- Listed weight: 195 lb (88 kg)

Career information
- High school: Harrison
- College: Michigan State
- NFL draft: 1989: undrafted

Career history
- Detroit Lions (1989–1990)
- Stats at Pro Football Reference

John Thomas Miller (born June 22, 1966) is an American former professional football player who was a safety for the Detroit Lions of the National Football League (NFL). He played college football for the Michigan State Spartans and was with the Lions for two seasons following 3 years playing for the Harrison high school football team in Farmington Hills, Michigan, which closed in 2019.
