= Vince Workman =

American football player (born 1967)

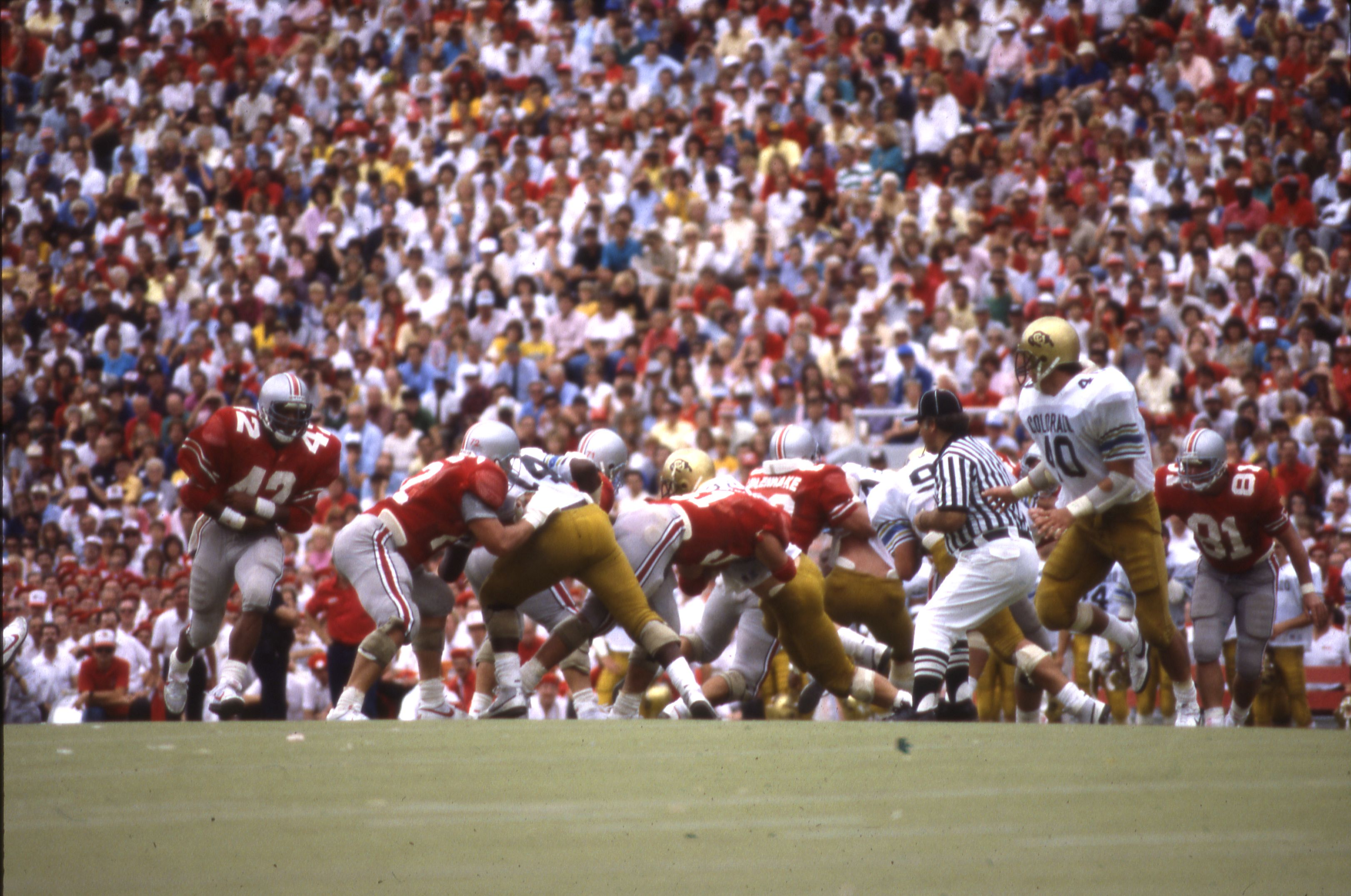
- Workman (#42) playing for the Ohio State Buckeyes in 1986

No. 46, 34
- Position: Running back

Personal information
- Born: May 9, 1967 (age 59); Buffalo, New York, U.S.
- Listed height: 5 ft 10 in (1.78 m)
- Listed weight: 215 lb (98 kg)

Career information
- High school: Dublin Coffman (Dublin, Ohio)
- College: Ohio State
- NFL draft: 1989: 5th round, 127th overall pick

Career history

Playing
- Green Bay Packers (1989–1992); Tampa Bay Buccaneers (1993–1994); Carolina Panthers (1995); Indianapolis Colts (1995–1996)

Coaching
- Green Bay Packers (2002–2006) Assistant strength coach

Career NFL statistics
- Rushing yards: 1,737
- Rushing average: 3.7
- Rushing touchdowns: 13
- Stats at Pro Football Reference

Vincent Workman (born May 9, 1967) is an American former professional football player who was a running back for eight seasons in the National Football League (NFL). He played college football for the Ohio State Buckeyes and was selected by the Green Bay Packers in the fifth round of the 1989 NFL draft.

== Early life and college ==
Workman attended Dublin Coffman High School in Dublin, Ohio, where he still holds all but one rushing record from his tenure from 1982 to 1984. With the Ohio State Buckeyes, Workman was a three-year starter at running back and wide receiver and was team captain in 1988.

== Professional career ==
Workman was selected by the Green Bay Packers in the fifth round of the 1989 NFL draft. Workman holds the Packers team record for most catches by a running back in a single game with 12 in 1992 against the Minnesota Vikings. He went on to play for the Tampa Bay Buccaneers and was a part of the inaugural Carolina Panthers squad, where he holds the Panthers record for most receptions by a running back in a game against the Los Angeles Rams in 1995. He was traded mid-season to the Indianapolis Colts, and played a full season there, before retiring in 1996.

Workman then worked for the Packers as a talent scout from 1999 to 2001, and as an assistant strength coach from 2002 to 2006. He was referred to by ESPN announcer Chris Berman as "Vince Workman My Way Back To You Babe" after the hit song by The Spinners.

== NFL career statistics ==
Legend
**Bold**	Career high

Year	Team	Games		Rushing					Receiving				
Year	Team	GP	GS	Att	Yds	Avg	Lng	TD	Rec	Yds	Avg	Lng	TD
1989	GNB	15	0	4	8	2.0	3	1	0	0	0.0	0	0
1990	GNB	15	0	8	51	**6.4**	31	0	4	30	7.5	9	1
1991	GNB	**16**	0	71	237	3.3	30	**7**	46	371	8.1	25	**4**
1992	GNB	10	10	**159**	**631**	4.0	**44**	2	47	290	6.2	21	0
1993	TAM	**16**	**11**	78	284	3.6	21	2	**54**	**411**	7.6	**42**	2
1994	TAM	15	8	79	291	3.7	18	0	11	82	7.5	23	0
1995	CAR	9	0	35	139	4.0	14	1	13	74	5.7	14	0
1995	IND	1	0	9	26	2.9	13	0	0	0	0.0	0	0
1996	IND	9	0	24	70	2.9	11	0	4	36	**9.0**	18	0
Career		106	29	467	1,737	3.7	44	13	179	1,294	7.2	42	7
