= Bobby McAllister (gridiron football) =

American gridiron football player (born 1966)

Bobby McAllister (born January 3, 1966) is a former American football and Canadian football quarterback in the Canadian Football League who played for the Toronto Argonauts and the World League of American Football for the Raleigh-Durham Skyhawks and San Antonio Riders. He played college football for the Michigan State Spartans. attended Blanche Ely High School in Pompano Beach, Florida
