= Bobby McAllister =

American soccer player-coach

Personal information
- Full name: Robert Allen McAllister
- Date of birth: May 8, 1963 (age 63)
- Place of birth: Seattle, Washington, United States
- Height: 5 ft 10 in (1.78 m)
- Position: Midfielder

Team information
- Current team: Sozo Sports of Central Washington (Co-Founder)

Youth career
- 1981–1983: Bellevue Community College

Senior career*
Years	Team	Apps	(Gls)
1983	Seattle Sounders Reserves NASL		
1985	St. Louis Steamers Discovery Player MISL (indoor)		
1996–2000	Yakima Reds USISL		
2001	Western Washington University (assistant coach)		
2004, 2006–2007	Yakima Reds USL PDL (assistant coach)		
- * Club domestic league appearances and goals

Robert "Bobby" McAllister (born May 8, 1963, in Seattle, Washington) is an American soccer player.

== Career ==
=== Professional ===
McAllister is recognized in the WSYSA "Best Soccer Ever" History Book in 2012 for his achievements in professional leagues, along with other Washington State Youth players that achieved professional leagues or Nation Team Player pools status. He played for the reserve team of the Seattle Sounders of the North American Soccer League in 1983, and played with the Yakima Reds in the USL for 5 seasons, 1996–2000.

=== Youth and college ===
McAllister graduated from Interlake High School where he was an All King County soccer player in 1981. He then played soccer on scholarship at Bellevue Community College where he was the team captain when it went to the 1981 and 1982 Northwest Athletic Association of Community Colleges state championships. He also was a two-time NWAACC all-star.

== Personal ==
McAllister has taken his coaching career to the college ranks as an assistant at Western Washington University in 2001, after two years he left to focus on youth development through the Selah Parks and recreation programs, and started Selah F.C. before becoming a coach with the Yakima Reds USISL. McAllister has served as Technical Director of Player Development and Coaching Education Director for Yakima Youth Soccer Association / Crossfire Yakima, and is the Director of his own Soccer Academy. McAllister is also a regional scout for alliance partnership parent club Crossfire Premier in the Eastern WA region. McAllister holds a USSF National "B" License thru U.S. Soccer.
