= Tom Tupa =

American football player (born 1966)

No. 19, 7, 9
- Positions: Punter, quarterback

Personal information
- Born: February 6, 1966 (age 60); Cleveland, Ohio, U.S.
- Listed height: 6 ft 4 in (1.93 m)
- Listed weight: 225 lb (102 kg)

Career information
- High school: Brecksville–Broadview Heights (Broadview Heights, Ohio)
- College: Ohio State (1984–1987)
- NFL draft: 1988: 3rd round, 68th overall pick

Career history

Playing
- Phoenix Cardinals (1988–1991); Indianapolis Colts (1992); Cleveland Browns (1993–1995); New England Patriots (1996–1998); New York Jets (1999–2001); Tampa Bay Buccaneers (2002–2003); Washington Redskins (2004–2005)

Coaching
- Brecksville–Broadview HS (2010–2016) Offensive coordinator

Awards and highlights
- Super Bowl champion (XXXVII); First-team All-Pro (1999); Pro Bowl (1999); New England Patriots All-1990s Team; Unanimous All-American (1987); Third-team All-American (1984); 3× First-team All-Big Ten (1984, 1985, 1987); Second-team All-Big Ten (1986)

Career NFL statistics
- Punts: 873
- Punting yards: 37,862
- Punting average: 43.4
- Passing attempts: 504
- Passing completions: 259
- Completion percentage: 51.4%
- TD–INT: 12–25
- Passing yards: 3,430
- Passer rating: 60.5
- Stats at Pro Football Reference

Thomas Joseph Tupa Jr. (born February 6, 1966) is an American former professional football player who was a punter the majority of his career after starting out as a quarterback in the National Football League (NFL). He played college football for the Ohio State Buckeyes. He was selected in the third round of the 1988 NFL draft by the Phoenix Cardinals. He also played for the Indianapolis Colts, Cleveland Browns, New England Patriots, New York Jets, Tampa Bay Buccaneers, and Washington Redskins.

== Early life ==
As a child, Tupa participated in the NFL's Punt, Pass, and Kick contest, and was a semi finalist three times, winning once. Tupa played mostly quarterback at Brecksville–Broadview Heights High School; he led his team to the state championship while also lettering in basketball (where he averaged 20.8 points per game) and baseball (where he was a pitcher and shortstop). While in high school, Tupa played on the same basketball team as former NBA head coach Eric Musselman and former NBA forward Scott Roth.

== College career ==
After sitting three seasons behind Mike Tomczak and Jim Karsatos, Tupa took over the starting quarterback job at Ohio State University in 1987, throwing for 2,252 yards, 15 touchdowns and 12 interceptions. He was selected as an All-American punter in the same season, as well as All-Big 10. Tupa was a four-time football letterman and was also selected to play in the 1988 Hula Bowl all-star game.

== Professional career ==
Pre-draft measurables
Height	Weight	Hand span	40-yard dash	10-yard split	20-yard split	20-yard shuttle	Vertical jump	Broad jump	Bench press
6 ft 4 1/2 in (1.94 m)	220 lb (100 kg)	10 1/4 in (0.26 m)	4.83 s	1.68 s	2.82 s	4.31 s	28.0 in (0.71 m)	8 ft 9 in (2.67 m)	13 reps
All values from NFL Combine

=== Phoenix Cardinals ===
Tupa was drafted in the third round (68th overall) of the 1988 NFL draft by the Phoenix Cardinals of the National Football League (NFL). His second season with the team saw an expanded role after. He started two games at quarterback, while registering six punts for 46.7 yards per punt. After spending the entire 1990 season as strictly a holder on kicks, he was the primary quarterback for the Cardinals the following year, playing in 11 games and throwing six touchdowns to 13 interceptions.

=== Indianapolis Colts ===
Tupa joined the Indianapolis Colts in 1992, as the backup for quarterbacks Jack Trudeau and Jeff George.

1992 also marked the last time Tupa was used regularly as a quarterback; after that he almost exclusively punted, with only emergency occasions or trick plays making use of his throwing skills.

=== Cleveland Browns ===
Tupa did not play in the 1993 NFL season, having been cut by the Cleveland Browns right before the season and later re-signed as a backup in November following an injury to starting quarterback Vinny Testaverde and the release of backup Bernie Kosar. He was retained by the Browns the following year and stayed with them for two seasons as their starting punter. With the Browns, Tupa scored the first two point conversion in NFL history, running in a faked extra point kick attempt for the Browns in a game against the Cincinnati Bengals in the first week of the 1994 season. He scored a total of three such conversions that season, earning him the nickname "Two Point Tupa."

=== New England Patriots ===
Tupa joined the New England Patriots in 1996 and played for them for three years. During his Patriots tenure, he played in Super Bowl XXXI, in which the Patriots lost to the Green Bay Packers. He was named the Patriots' All-1990s Team in 2009.

=== New York Jets ===
In 1999, Tupa signed with the New York Jets. It was during this season that Tupa received his first invitation to the Pro Bowl. He also made his first pass attempt since 1996, and went 6-of-10 for 165 yards and two touchdowns during the Jets' week one matchup against his former team, the Patriots. Tupa was put in at quarterback in the first quarter after Vinny Testaverde tore his achilles tendon, as under NFL rules at the time, using an emergency quarterback before the fourth quarter meant that the starting and backup quarterbacks could not play for the remainder of the game. Despite his success, once the third quarter ended, Tupa was moved back to punting and the Jets switched to emergency quarterback Rick Mirer, who ended up going 4-of-11 for 28 yards and two interceptions, the second of which set up a game-winning field goal from the Patriots' Adam Vinatieri. The Jets lost the game to the Patriots 30–28, and ended up missing the playoffs that season by one game, finishing with an 8–8 record. Tupa remained with the Jets through the 2001 season.

=== Tampa Bay Buccaneers ===
2002 saw Tupa sign with the Tampa Bay Buccaneers, where he was their punter on their road to Super Bowl XXXVII, where they defeated the Oakland Raiders.

=== Washington Redskins ===
Before the start of the 2004 NFL season, Tupa signed with the Washington Redskins. In 2004, he was named as a Pro Bowl second alternate. He spent 2005 on the injured reserve list, and did not appear in a game.

The final pass of Tupa's career was thrown in an overtime loss in the 2002 season-opener against the New Orleans Saints during a punt attempt from the Buccaneers' five-yard line. Pressure from a Saints defender forced Tupa to abort the punt attempt and throw a desperation pass with his non-throwing arm which was intercepted by a Saints defender and returned for a touchdown, ending the game.

=== Retirement ===
Tupa announced his retirement from football in the spring of 2006. In February 2006, he was appointed as the recreation director of Brecksville, Ohio.

== NFL career statistics ==
Legend
	Won the Super Bowl
	Led the league
**Bold**	Career high

=== Regular season ===
Year	Team	Punting									
Year	Team	GP	Punts	Yds	Net Yds	Lng	Avg	Net Avg	Blk	Ins20	TB
1988	PHO	2	Played as QB								
1989	PHO	14	6	280	239	51	**46.7**	**39.8**	0	2	0
1990	PHO	15	Played as QB								
1991	PHO	11	Played as QB								
1992	IND	3	Played as QB								
1994	CLE	**16**	80	3,211	2,831	65	40.1	35.4	0	27	8
1995	CLE	**16**	65	2,831	2,355	64	43.6	36.2	0	18	9
1996	NE	**16**	63	2,739	2,265	62	43.5	36.0	0	14	7
1997	NE	**16**	78	3,569	2,852	**73**	45.8	36.1	**1**	24	14
1998	NE	**16**	74	3,294	2,621	64	44.5	35.4	0	13	9
1999	NYJ	**16**	81	3,659	3,092	69	45.2	38.2	0	25	7
2000	NYJ	**16**	83	3,714	2,754	70	44.7	33.2	0	18	**15**
2001	NYJ	15	67	2,575	2,142	59	38.4	32.0	0	21	5
2002	TB	**16**	90	3,856	3,183	71	42.8	35.4	0	**30**	12
2003	TB	**16**	83	3,590	2,981	60	43.3	35.9	0	26	6
2004	WAS	**16**	**103**	**4,544**	**3,657**	61	44.1	35.2	**1**	**30**	8
Career		220	873	37,862	30,972	73	43.4	35.4	2	248	100

=== Playoffs ===
Year	Team	Punting									
Year	Team	GP	Punts	Yds	Net Yds	Lng	Avg	Net Avg	Blk	Ins20	TB
1994	CLE	2	8	303	278	45	37.9	34.8	0	2	1
1996	NE	**3**	**21**	**904**	**745**	53	43.0	35.5	0	**7**	1
1997	NE	2	14	551	428	54	39.4	30.6	0	3	0
1998	NE	1	8	378	286	**58**	**47.3**	**35.8**	0	1	1
2001	NYJ	1	1	24	24	24	24.0	24.0	0	1	0
2002	TB	**3**	15	598	470	52	39.9	29.4	**1**	3	**2**
Career		12	67	2,758	2,231	58	41.2	32.8	1	17	5

== Personal life ==
Tupa was the offensive coordinator at his high school alma mater, Brecksville–Broadview Heights High School, where he called the plays for both his sons. He was also Brecksville's recreation director from 2006 until his retirement on May 7, 2021.

His son Tom Tupa III was a quarterback for Miami University in Oxford, Ohio. His son Tim Tupa played wide receiver for the Bowling Green State University. His son Tyler Tupa formerly played wide receiver for Ohio University.

He is a first cousin of former Colorado Democratic State Senator and Majority Caucus Leader Ron Tupa.
