= 1987–88 NCAA football bowl games =

College football postseason game series

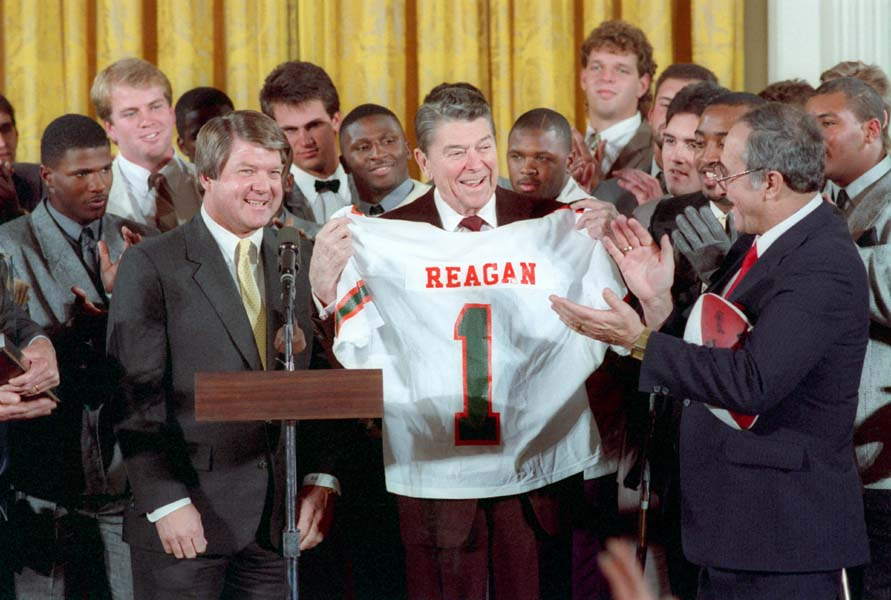
- President Ronald Reagan holds up a University of Miami jersey presented to him by Miami Hurricanes head coach Jimmy Johnson and the 1987 Miami Hurricanes football team after winning the 1987 national championship
- Season: 1987
- Number of bowls: 18
- Bowl games: December 13, 1987 – January 2, 1988
- National Championship: Orange Bowl
- Location of Championship: Miami, Florida
- Champions: Miami Hurricanes
Bowl record by conference
Conference	Bowls	Record	Final AP poll
Independent	9	2–6–1 (0.278)	5
SEC	6	3–2–1 (0.583)	4
Big Ten	4	3–1 (0.750)	3
Pac-10	4	3–1 (0.750)	3
Big 8	3	1–2 (0.333)	3
SWC	3	2–1 (0.667)	1
WAC	3	0–3 (0.000)	0
ACC	2	2–0 (1.000)	1
MAC	1	1–0 (1.000)	0
PCAA	1	0–1 (0.000)	0

The 1987–88 NCAA football bowl games concluded the 1987 NCAA Division I-A football season, featuring 18 games. Twenty ranked teams participated, and seven of the eighteen matchups were between two ranked teams. The Miami Hurricanes were declared the national champions, after upsetting #1 Oklahoma in the Orange Bowl.

Seventeen of the bowl games ended with a winner, while there was a lone tie (Auburn vs Syracuse in the Sugar Bowl).

Nine independent teams competed, along with six SEC teams, four Big Ten, four Pac-10, three WAC, three Big 8, three SWC, two ACC, one MAC, and one PCAA.

The largest margin of victory occurred twice; Clemson beat Penn State and Texas A&M beat Notre Dame, both 35-10.

The "bowl week" started on December 13 with the California Bowl, and concluded on January 2, 1988 with the Hall of Fame Bowl and the Peach Bowl.

== Bowl schedule ==
Date	Game	Site	Television	Teams	Affiliations	Results
Dec. 13	California Bowl	Bulldog Stadium; Fresno, California	ESPN	Eastern Michigan Hurons (9–2); San Jose State Spartans (10–1)	MAC; PCAA	Eastern Michigan 30; San Jose State 27
Dec. 19	Independence Bowl	Independence Stadium; Shreveport, Louisiana	Mizlou	Washington Huskies (6–4–1); Tulane Green Wave (6–5)	Pac-10; Independent	Washington 24; Tulane 12
Dec. 22	All-American Bowl	Legion Field; Birmingham, Alabama	Raycom	BYU Cougars (9–3); Virginia Cavaliers (7–4)	WAC; ACC	Virginia 22; BYU 16
Dec. 25	Jeep Eagle Aloha Bowl	Aloha Stadium; Honolulu, HI	ABC	#10 UCLA Bruins (9–2); Florida Gators (6–5)	Pac-10; SEC	UCLA 20; Florida 16
Dec. 25	John Hancock Sun Bowl	Sun Bowl; El Paso, Texas	CBS	West Virginia Mountaineers (6–5) #11 Oklahoma State Cowboys (9–2)	Independent; Big 8	Oklahoma State 35; West Virginia 33
Dec. 29	Liberty Bowl	Liberty Bowl Memorial Stadium; Memphis, Tennessee	Raycom	Arkansas Razorbacks (9–3) #15 Georgia Bulldogs (8–3)	SWC; SEC	Georgia 20; Arkansas 17
Dec. 30	Freedom Bowl	Anaheim Stadium; Anaheim, California	Mizlou	Air Force Falcons (9–3); Arizona State Sun Devils (6–4–1)	WAC; Pac-10	Arizona State 33; Air Force 28
Dec. 30	SeaWorld Holiday Bowl	Jack Murphy Stadium; San Diego	ESPN	#18 Iowa Hawkeyes (9–3); Wyoming Cowboys (10–2)	Big Ten; WAC	Iowa 20; Wyoming 19
Dec. 31	Mazda Gator Bowl	Gator Bowl Stadium; Jacksonville, Florida	CBS	#9 South Carolina Gamecocks (8–3) #7 LSU Tigers (9–1–1)	Independent; SEC	LSU 30; South Carolina 13
Dec. 31	Astro-Bluebonnet Bowl	Astrodome; Houston	Mizlou	#19 Pittsburgh Panthers (8–3); Texas Longhorns (6–5)	Independent; SWC	Texas 32; Pittsburgh 27
Jan. 1	Rose Bowl	Rose Bowl; Pasadena, California	NBC	#16 USC Trojans (8–3) #8 Michigan State Spartans (8–2–1)	Pac-10; Big Ten	Michigan State 20; USC 17
Jan. 1	Orange Bowl; National Championship	Orange Bowl; Miami	NBC	#2 Miami Hurricanes (11–0) #1 Oklahoma Sooners (11–0)	Independent; Big 8	Miami 20; Oklahoma 14
Jan. 1	Florida Citrus Bowl	Florida Citrus Bowl; Orlando, Florida	ABC	#14 Clemson Tigers (9–2) #20 Penn State Nittany Lions (8–3)	ACC; Independent	Clemson 35; Penn State 10
Jan. 1	Sunkist Fiesta Bowl	Sun Devil Stadium; Tempe, Arizona	NBC	#3 Florida State Seminoles (10–1) #5 Nebraska Cornhuskers (10–1)	Independent; Big 8	Florida State 31; Nebraska 28
Jan. 1	Cotton Bowl Classic	Cotton Bowl; Dallas	CBS	#12 Notre Dame Fighting Irish (8–3) #13 Texas A&M Aggies (9–2)	Independent; SWC	Texas A&M 35; Notre Dame 10
Jan. 1	USF&G Sugar Bowl	Louisiana Superdome; New Orleans	ABC	#6 Auburn Tigers (9–1–1) #4 Syracuse Orangemen (11–0)	SEC; Independent	Auburn 16; Syracuse 16
Jan. 2	Hall of Fame Bowl	Tampa Stadium; Tampa, Florida	NBC	Michigan Wolverines (7–4); Alabama Crimson Tide (7–4)	Big Ten; SEC	Michigan 28; Alabama 24
Jan. 2	Peach Bowl	Atlanta–Fulton County Stadium; Atlanta	Mizlou	#17 Tennessee Volunteers (9–2–1); Indiana Hoosiers (8–3)	SEC; Big Ten	Tennessee 27; Indiana 22
