= 1988 Sugar Bowl =

1988 USF&G Sugar Bowl
- 54th Sugar Bowl
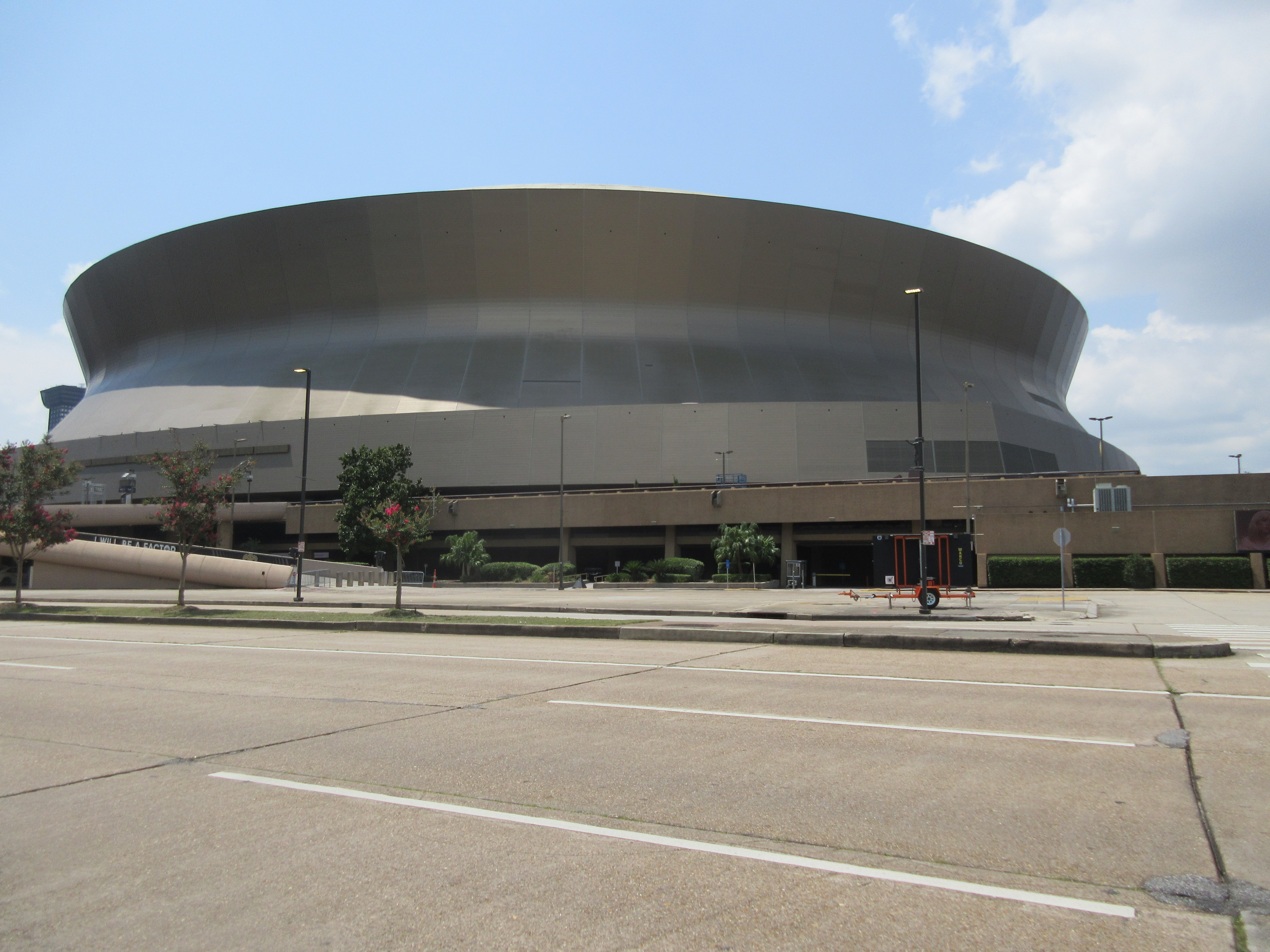
- The Louisiana Superdome in New Orleans, Louisiana, hosted the Sugar Bowl.
Auburn Tigers	Syracuse Orangemen
(9–1–1)	(11–0)
SEC	Independent
16	16
Head coach: Pat Dye	Head coach: Dick MacPherson
AP / Coaches; 6 / 6	AP / Coaches; 4 / 4
	1	2	3	4	Total
Auburn	7	3	0	6	16
Syracuse	0	7	3	6	16
- Date: January 1, 1988
- Season: 1987
- Stadium: Louisiana Superdome
- Location: New Orleans, Louisiana
- MVP: Don McPherson (Syracuse QB)
- Favorite: Auburn by 2½ points
- Referee: John McClintock (Big Eight)

United States TV coverage
- Network: ABC
- Announcers: Keith Jackson (Play by Play) Bob Griese (Color); Mike Adamle (Sideline)

The 1988 Sugar Bowl was the 54th edition of the college football bowl game, played at the Louisiana Superdome in New Orleans, Louisiana, on Friday, January 1. Part of the 1987–88 bowl game season, it featured sixth-ranked Auburn Tigers of the Southeastern Conference (SEC) and the undefeated No. 4 Syracuse Orangemen, an independent.

The game ended in a 16–16 tie after slightly-favored Auburn made a thirty-yard field goal in the final seconds. It is the only tie in Sugar Bowl history.

== Teams ==
=== Auburn ===
The Tigers (9–1–1) tied Tennessee on the road in September and lost 34–6 to independent Florida State at home in early November. They defeated Florida, Georgia, and Alabama to take the SEC title, and did not play LSU.

=== Syracuse ===
Unranked at the start of the season, the Orangemen won all eleven games and were unbeaten for the first time since winning the national championship in 1959. The most notable win was at home, 48–21 over defending national champion Penn State in mid-October. Quarterback Don McPherson was a consensus All-American and was the runner-up in the balloting for the Heisman Trophy.

== Game summary ==
Both televised by ABC, the game followed the Florida Citrus Bowl and kicked off shortly after 2:30 p.m. CST, two hours after the Cotton Bowl (CBS) and Fiesta Bowl (NBC) started, and over an hour before the Rose Bowl (NBC).

Auburn cracked the scoreboard first, following a 17-yard touchdown pass from quarterback Jeff Burger to wide receiver Lawyer Tillman, who had six receptions for 125 yards. In the second quarter, Syracuse tied the game at seven on a twelve-yard touchdown pass from Don McPherson to wideout Deval Glover. Auburn added a forty-yard field goal from Win Lyle to take a 10–7 lead into halftime.

In the third quarter, Tim Vesling kicked a 27-yard field goal to tie the game at ten. In the fourth quarter, Lyle's second field goal from 41 yards gave Auburn a three-point lead, but two field goals by Vesling put Syracuse ahead, 16–13. With four seconds remaining and the ball on the Syracuse thirteen, Auburn head coach Pat Dye opted for three points; Win Lyle kicked a thirty-yard field goal for Auburn and the game ended in a 16–16 tie, the first and only time in Sugar Bowl history.

The game was a defensive battle, and the tie helped Syracuse cap an unbeaten season. McPherson was named the game's outstanding player, going 11-of-21 for 140 yards and one touchdown; he was sacked five times by the Auburn defense.

=== Scoring ===
First quarter

- Auburn – Lawyer Tillman 17-yard pass from Jeff Burger (Win Lyle kick)

Second quarter

- Syracuse – Deval Glover 12-yard pass from Don McPherson (Tim Vesling kick)
- Auburn – Lyle 40-yard field goal

Third quarter

- Syracuse – Vesling 27-yard field goal

Fourth quarter

- Auburn – Lyle 41-yard field goal
- Syracuse – Vesling 32-yard field goal
- Syracuse – Vesling 38-yard field goal
- Auburn – Lyle 30-yard field goal

== Statistics ==
:{| class=wikitable style="text-align:center"

! Statistics !! Auburn !! Syracuse |- |align=left|First downs || 14 || 23 |- |align=left|Rushes–yards|| 22–41|| 55–174 |- |align=left|Passing yards || 229 || 140 |- |align=left|Passes || 25–34–1 || 11–21–0 |- |align=left|Total offense || 56–270 || 76–314 |- |align=left|Return yards || 0 || 38 |- |align=left|Punts–average ||6–44.8|| 5–35.6 |- |align=left|Fumbles–lost ||1–0|| 2–0 |- |align=left|Turnovers||1||0 |- |align=left|Penalties–yards ||5–43||2–20 |- |align=left|Time of possession ||22:25 ||37:35 |}

== Aftermath ==
Syracuse fans were outraged by Auburn's decision to tie the game, while Auburn fans found the choice uncontroversial. In protest of the decision by Auburn to tie the game, a Syracuse radio station mailed Auburn coach Dye 2,000 ugly ties, which Dye autographed and auctioned off, raising $30,000 for the Auburn general scholarship fund.

Syracuse remained at fourth in the final AP poll, while Auburn dropped one spot to seventh.

Syracuse and Auburn did not play again until the schools agreed to a home and home series in 2001 and 2002. Syracuse won the 2001 game in the Carrier Dome 31-14, and Auburn won the 2002 game at Jordan-Hare Stadium 37-34 in double overtime.
