= 1988 Peach Bowl (January) =

American college football game

- 20th Peach Bowl
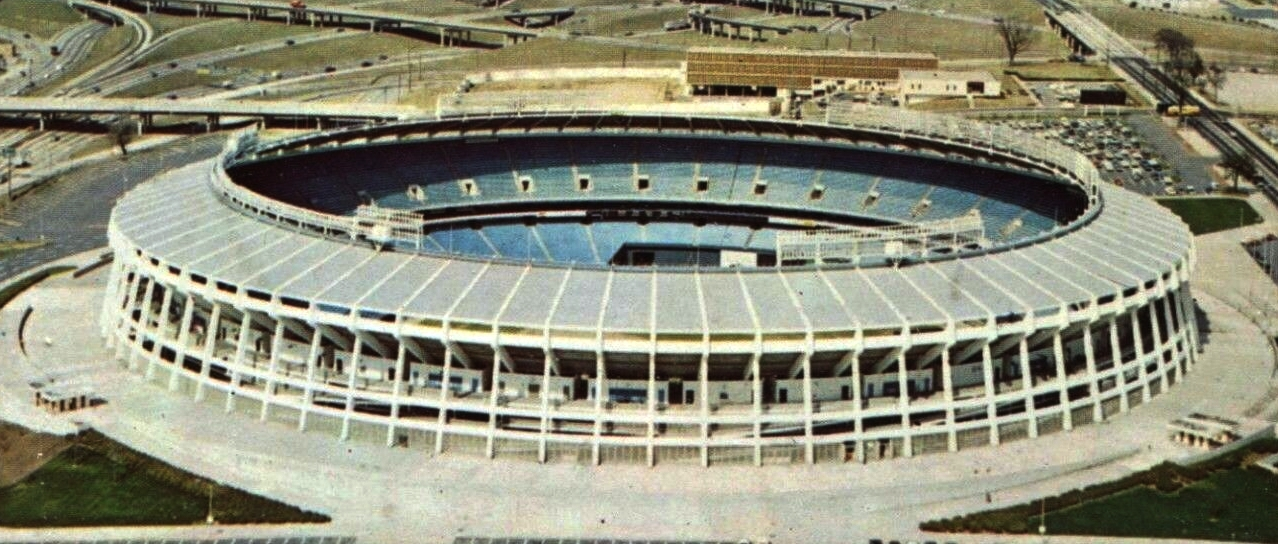
- Atlanta–Fulton County Stadium in Atlanta, Georgia, hosted the Peach Bowl.
Tennessee Volunteers	Indiana Hoosiers
(9–2–1)	(8–3)
SEC	Big Ten
27	22
Head coach: Johnny Majors	Head coach: Bill Mallory
AP / Coaches; 17 / 16	AP / Coaches; NR / 20
	1	2	3	4	Total
Tennessee	14	7	0	6	27
Indiana	3	7	6	6	22
- Date: January 2, 1988
- Season: 1987
- Stadium: Atlanta–Fulton County Stadium
- Location: Atlanta, GA
- MVP: Reggie Cobb (Tennessee RB); Van Waiters (Indiana LB)
- Referee: John Soffey (CIFOA)
- Attendance: 58,737

United States TV coverage
- Network: Mizlou
- Announcers: Ray Scott and Ed Biles

The 1988 Peach Bowl, part of the 1987–88 bowl game season, took place on January 2, 1988, at Atlanta–Fulton County Stadium in Atlanta, Georgia. The competing teams were the Tennessee Volunteers, representing the Southeastern Conference (SEC), and the Indiana Hoosiers of the Big Ten Conference (Big Ten). In what was the first ever meeting between the schools, Tennessee was victorious by a final score of 27–22.

== Teams ==
=== Tennessee ===
The 1987 Tennessee squad finished the regular season with a tie against Auburn and losses to Alabama and Boston College en route to an overall record of nine wins, two losses and one tie (9–2–1). In mid-November, the Volunteers accepted an invitation to play in the Peach Bowl. The appearance marked the second for Tennessee in the Peach Bowl, and their 29th overall bowl game.

=== Indiana ===
The 1987 Indiana squad finished the regular season with losses at Kentucky, Iowa and Michigan State en route to an overall record of eight wins and three losses (8–3). In mid-November, the Hoosiers accepted an invitation to play in the Peach Bowl. Their appearance marked the first for Indiana in the Peach Bowl, and their fourth overall bowl game.

== Game summary ==
Tennessee scored first when Reggie Cobb scored on a six-yard touchdown run midway through the first quarter that gave the Volunteers an early 7–0 lead. Later in the quarter, Indiana cut the lead to 7–3 after a 52-yard field goal by Pete Stoyanovich, but Tennessee responded on their next possession with a 45-yard Jeff Francis touchdown pass to Anthony Miller that made the score 14–3 at the end of the first. The Volunteers took a commanding 21–3 lead early in the second quarter on a 15-yard Miller touchdown pass to Terence Cleveland, but the Hoosiers then started their comeback that eventually resulted in a 22–21 lead. After a Cobb fumble gave Indiana possession on their own nine-yard line, they proceeded to drive 91-yards with their first touchdown scored by Ernest Jones on a 43-yard Dave Schnell pass that made the halftime score 21–10. In the third, Anthony Thompson scored on a 12-yard run and Tim Jorden scored on another 12-yard run in the fourth that gave the Hoosiers a 22–21 lead after a pair of missed two-point conversions. Tennessee then scored the game-winning touchdown with just under two minutes remaining in the game on a nine-yard Cobb touchdown run that made the final score 27–22. For their individual performances, Cobb was recognized as the offensive MVP and Van Waiters was recognized as the defensive MVP of the game.

Scoring summary

Quarter	Time	Drive			Team	Scoring information	Score	
Quarter	Time	Plays	Yards	TOP	Team	Scoring information	Tennessee	Indiana
1	7:01				Tennessee	Reggie Cobb 6-yard touchdown run, Phil Reich kick good	7	0
1	3:54				Indiana	52-yard field goal by Pete Stoyanovich	7	3
1	0:27				Tennessee	Anthony Miller 45-yard touchdown reception from Jeff Francis, Phil Reich kick good	14	3
2	11:49				Tennessee	Terence Cleveland 15-yard touchdown reception from Jeff Francis, Phil Reich kick good	21	3
2	6:26				Indiana	Ernest Jones 43-yard touchdown reception from Dave Schnell, Pete Stoyanovich kick good	21	10
3	8:44				Indiana	Anthony Thompson 12-yard touchdown run, 2-point pass failed	21	16
4	8:41				Indiana	Tim Jorden 12-yard touchdown run, 2-point pass failed	21	22
4	1:52				Tennessee	Reggie Cobb 9-yard touchdown run, 2-point pass failed	27	22
"TOP" = time of possession. For other American football terms, see Glossary of American football.							27	22
