= 1987 Vanderbilt Commodores football team =

American college football season

1987 Vanderbilt Commodores football
- Conference: Southeastern Conference
- Record: 4–7 (1–5 SEC)
- Head coach: Watson Brown (2nd season)
- Defensive coordinator: Dick Hopkins (2nd season)
- Base defense: 5–3
- Home stadium: Vanderbilt Stadium

1987 Southeastern Conference football standings
	Conf.					Overall
Team	W		L		T	W		L		T
No. 7 Auburn $	5	–	0	–	1	9	–	1	–	2
No. 5 LSU	5	–	1	–	0	10	–	1	–	1
No. 14 Tennessee	4	–	1	–	1	10	–	2	–	1
No. 13 Georgia	4	–	2	–	0	9	–	3	–	0
Alabama	4	–	2	–	0	7	–	5	–	0
Florida	3	–	3	–	0	6	–	6	–	0
Kentucky	1	–	5	–	0	5	–	6	–	0
Mississippi State	1	–	5	–	0	4	–	7	–	0
Vanderbilt	1	–	5	–	0	4	–	7	–	0
Ole Miss	1	–	5	–	0	3	–	8	–	0
$ – Conference champion; Rankings from AP Poll

The 1987 Vanderbilt Commodores football team represented Vanderbilt University in the 1987 NCAA Division I-A football season as a member of the Southeastern Conference (SEC). The Commodores were led by head coach Watson Brown in his second season and finished with a record of four wins and seven losses (4–7 overall, 1–5 in the SEC).

== Schedule ==
Date	Opponent	Site	TV	Result	Attendance	Source
September 12	Memphis State*	Vanderbilt Stadium; Nashville, TN		W 27–17	40,694	
September 19	at Duke*	Wallace Wade Stadium; Durham, NC		L 31–35	23,100	
September 26	No. 17 Alabama	Vanderbilt Stadium; Nashville, TN		L 23–30	41,824	
October 3	at Tulane*	Louisiana Superdome; New Orleans, LA		L 17–27	34,878	
October 10	at No. 5 Auburn	Jordan-Hare Stadium; Auburn, AL		L 15–48	79,500	
October 17	No. 18 Georgia	Vanderbilt Stadium; Nashville, TN (rivalry)		L 24–52	40,878	
October 24	at Ole Miss	Vaught–Hemingway Stadium; Oxford, MS (rivalry)		L 14–42	31,000	
October 31	Rutgers*^{†}	Vanderbilt Stadium; Nashville, TN	TBS	W 27–13	35,347	
November 7	Kentucky	Vanderbilt Stadium; Nashville, TN (rivalry)	WZTV	W 38–29	40,892	
November 21	Maryland*	Vanderbilt Stadium; Nashville, TN		W 34–24	34,816	
November 28	at No. 16 Tennessee	Neyland Stadium; Knoxville, TN (rivalry)	WZTV	L 36–38	93,306	
*Non-conference game; ^{†}Homecoming; Rankings from AP Poll released prior to the game
