= 1987 Ole Miss Rebels football team =

American college football season

1987 Ole Miss Rebels football
- Conference: Southeastern Conference
- Record: 3–8 (1–5 SEC)
- Head coach: Billy Brewer (5th season)
- Offensive coordinator: Bill Canty (2nd season)
- Defensive coordinator: Ron Case (1st season)
- Home stadium: Vaught–Hemingway Stadium; Mississippi Veterans Memorial Stadium

1987 Southeastern Conference football standings
	Conf.					Overall
Team	W		L		T	W		L		T
No. 7 Auburn $	5	–	0	–	1	9	–	1	–	2
No. 5 LSU	5	–	1	–	0	10	–	1	–	1
No. 14 Tennessee	4	–	1	–	1	10	–	2	–	1
No. 13 Georgia	4	–	2	–	0	9	–	3	–	0
Alabama	4	–	2	–	0	7	–	5	–	0
Florida	3	–	3	–	0	6	–	6	–	0
Kentucky	1	–	5	–	0	5	–	6	–	0
Mississippi State	1	–	5	–	0	4	–	7	–	0
Vanderbilt	1	–	5	–	0	4	–	7	–	0
Ole Miss	1	–	5	–	0	3	–	8	–	0
$ – Conference champion; Rankings from AP Poll

The 1987 Ole Miss Rebels football team represented the University of Mississippi in the sport of American football during the 1987 NCAA Division I-A football season. The Rebels won 3 games and lost 8. Star players included Mark Young and Willie Green. The team beat Arkansas State, Southwestern Louisiana, and Vanderbilt. The team was hit with a bowl ban and TV ban after 1986. Nevertheless, with nine starters returning on both offense and defense from a team that the year before finished 8-3-1 and won their first bowl game in fifteen years, the Rebels startingly underperformed from what was expected from them from very many Ole Miss fans as well as the sports media.

The team opened the season in Memphis against Memphis State. Against a Tiger team that the previous year finished 1-10 and that the Rebels defeated 28–6, Ole Miss lost a fumble at its own 29-yard line leading to Memphis State's only touchdown, had five-yard illegal-motion penalties stall two drives (one to the 36-yard line in opposing team territory), threw an interception that lead to a 10–0 halftime deficit, lost a fumble at the Tiger 22 on an errant pitch, surrendered a 21-yard punt return aided by a broken tackle and five-yard facemask penalty leading to a field goal, had a pair of dropped passes (two of six for the entire game) stall a drive at the Memphis State 17 where they were only able to get a field goal instead of a touchdown, after stopping the Tigers on a third-down-and-one at the Rebel 34 were hit with a fifteen-yard personal foul penalty, and then when Memphis State was hit with a holding penalty and after throwing them for an eight-yard loss and forcing them to attempt a 47-yard field goal which was off to the right, were hit with a fifteen-yard penalty for roughing the kicker. The Tigers then played it conservatively, and were able to get a 27-yard field goal for a 16–3 lead. Ole Miss rallied for a touchdown and were late in the game able to advance the ball to the Memphis State one-yard line but were stopped there on two running plays, and the Rebels, a 13.5 point favorite entering the game, lost by six points. This loss shocked many and seemed to set the tone for the season.

For their next game, the Rebels returned to Mississippi with a game against Arkansas in Jackson. After spotting the Razorbacks a 3–0 lead, Ole Miss was able to move the ball to the Arkansas five-yard line with a 56-yard pass completion from Young to Green. But immediately after that, the Rebels fumbled the ball on pitch which they recovered for a loss of eight to the thirteen-yard line, on the very next play were penalized for delay-of-game back to the eighteen, two plays later had a fourteen-yard touchdown pass wiped out with a penalty for an illegal-shift, and finally had to settle for a 22-yard field goal. After surrendering a Razorback touchdown, Young threw an interception returned sixteen yards for a touchdown that he would say after the game was against a defense he hadn't seen. The Rebels would soon give up another touchdown on a drive where Ole Miss committed a fifteen-yard facemask penalty after throwing the Razorbacks for a two-yard loss and were penalized eight yards for illegal participation to Ole Miss seven-yard line after forcing Arkansas into a third-and-one-situation at the Rebel 15. On the next Rebel drive, they reached the Razorback 31-yard line, but threw an interception inside the Hog ten that was returned to the 23-yard line. Ole Miss would rally with a touchdown pass on fourth down to go into halftime down by fourteen. The Rebels would open the second half by advancing the ball to the Hog 39-yard line, but would get no farther and punted. After forcing a Razorback punt, the Rebels on a running play lost a fumble after a ten-yard gain their 28 following which Arkansas quickly scored to stretch their lead back to twenty-one points. On their next offensive drive, Ole Miss advanced to the Arkansas 30-yard line, but were hit with a holding penalty and ended up having to punt. Late in the game, the Rebels advanced all the way to the Hog 4-yard line, but threw an interception there and the game soon ended. The Rebels, just a four-point underdog entering the game, underperformed the spread by seventeen points. Media after the game would describe the performance as essentially the same as the previous Ole Miss game.

After disposing of Division I-AA Arkansas State 47–10 in Oxford, Ole Miss then traveled to New Orleans to face the Tulane Green Wave, a team they defeated 35–10 in 1986, in the Superdome. The Rebels gave the Wave the first shot at points in the game, fumbling to them at their 35 after driving from their own 26-yard line. Tulane's drive, however, stalled at the Ole Miss 34-yard line when a Green Wave receiver dropped a pass at the Ole Miss 30, and they missed a 52-yard field goal. The Rebels took over at their 35, and then covered the distance for a touchdown, an eight-yard run by Young. On the following possession, Tulane, after Ole Miss on third down was ruled guilty of pass interference following a broken-up pass, drove to the Rebel 48-yard line and came close to the game-tying points when star quarterback Terrence Jones (gridiron football) found star wide receiver Marc Zeno running well ahead of his Ole Miss defender, but he dropped the pass at the Rebel 30, and Tulane was forced to punt. The rest of the first half was uneventful until near the end when Ole Miss drove from its own 25-yard line all the way to the Tulane 3, but on third down, Young scrambled, fumbled, and fell on the football for a loss of one yard, and the Rebels were forced to settle for a field goal. Tulane took over at its 37-yard line with 1:09 left in the half and, aided by a five-yard face mask penalty against Ole Miss, scored their first points of the game, a six-yard touchdown pass from Jones to Zeno and closed out the half down 10–7.

The Green Wave opened the second half with an incredible drive starting at their own 22 and ending with a spectacular play for a touchdown where Jones slipped an Ole Miss tackle, took off left, then eyeing Rebel defenders closing in on him, rolled right, then spotted receiver Michael Pierce alone in the back of the endzone and stopped, stepped, and threw to him a 28-yard touchdown pass. Following the extra-point, the Wave had a four-point lead. The Rebels on their next drive were able to regain the lead with a 66-yard touchdown run by running back Willie Goodloe, the longest run from scrimmage for an Ole Miss back in eight years. On the next possession, one that arguably was the defining moment of missed opportunities for the season when push came to shove for the Ole Miss football team, on the kickoff, the Tulane receiver fumbled the ball and was forced to kneel at his own one-yard line. The Wave were only able to gain six yards and were forced to punt, a punt which rolled dead at the Ole Miss 44. However, the Rebels on the punt had twelve men on the field and were penalized fifteen yards giving Tulane a first down at their 22. The Green Wave then drove to the Rebel eighteen, and a second down pass from Jones to Zeno fell incomplete, but Ole Miss was again penalized fifteen yards for pass interference, and Tulane immediately scored on a three-yard touchdown run. Ole Miss was able to counter with a seventy-seven-yard drive on its next possession, which ended with a two-yard touchdown run by Goodloe. That would turn out to be both the last lead for Ole Miss for the night as well as the last points they scored.

On Tulane's next possession, Jones threw an interception that Ole Miss nabbed at the Tulane 35, but the Rebels were unable to capitalize, gaining only two yards and missing wide left a 50-yard field goal. The two teams then exchanged punts, and Jones drove the Wave to the Rebel 36 where he then threw an interception for the second recent time to preserve a four-point Ole Miss lead. But the Rebels did not take advantage of the second critical Wave error, throwing an interception of their own on the following play at the Tulane 35 that was returned to the Green Wave 40. Although the Wave were penalized for holding back to their 32 at one point, the Rebels could not stop them from driving to the Ole Miss three-yard line, where they kicked a game-tying field goal. On the next possession, Ole Miss drove to the Tulane 43-yard line but fumbled to the Green Wave at their 38. Tulane then drove to the Ole Miss 44-yard line where they completed a 16-yard screen pass, and Ole Miss was penalized fifteen yards for a personal foul putting the ball on their own 13. On the next play, Zeno outfought two defenders in the endzone for a touchdown reception from Jones. The ensuing extra-point completed the scoring for the game. In spite of all the aforementioned Tulane errors, particularly the one on the kickoff, Ole Miss, a nine-point favorite for the game, lost 31–24, the third time to that point they underperformed the spread by fifteen or more points. Media following the game referred to it as another disappointing defeat for the Rebels.

Ole Miss would return to Oxford for their SEC opener against the Georgia Bulldogs. The Bulldogs would be without star running back Lars Tate. Georgia received the opening kickoff, and on a 3rd-and-13 from their 45-yard line Ole Miss held the Bulldogs to only four yards on a pass reception, but was penalized five yards for grabbing a face mask and on the subsequent third down play surrendered 26 yards on a pass reception and four plays later Georgia would go up 7–0 on a touchdown pass. Rodney Hampton, making his first-ever collegiate start, carried the ball three times in the drive for twenty five yards. Two more times in the quarter, Georgia would drive into Ole Miss territory, once to the Rebel two-yard line, but threw interceptions both times to kill scoring chances. Despite the opportunities, on its possession after the last interception, Ole Miss threw an interception of its own returned to the Rebel 47. Georgia eventually cashed that in for a 27-yard field goal and 10–0 lead. Except for a moment when it appeared the Rebels recovered a fumbled punt, but both they and the Bulldogs were hit with offsetting penalties and Ole Miss punted over for only twenty yards to the Georgia thirty, the rest of the half was uneventful until a little over three minutes left. Ole Miss took over on its own 12 and drove all the way to the Georgia 27, but had a pass dropped that should have cut into the Bulldog lead, was hit with an illegal procedure penalty on the next play, and then threw an interception at the Georgia 24 that was returned to the Bulldog thirty-yard line, and the half soon ended.

On a third-and-four play at their own 26 after they received the second-half kickoff, Ole Miss fumbled to Georgia and the Bulldogs recovered at the Rebel 24. Three plays later, the Rebels were called for a late hit that moved the ball from their fourteen-yard line to their seven and two plays after that, Georgia scored for a 17–0 lead on Ole Miss home turf. The Rebels showed signs of life on their next drive when they drove 80 yards for a touchdown. The drive was aided by Georgia being called for offsides on a third-and-one play. Two possessions later, Georgia began a 65-yard drive in the third quarter that ended with a touchdown early in the fourth for a 24-7 Bulldog lead. On the drive, Georgia converted two fourth-and-one plays, one at the Ole Miss 15, the other the Rebel 4, with the freshman Hampton gaining two yards on both of them as well as catching an eight-yard pass for the touchdown. Ole Miss was able to come right back with a seventy-yard drive for a touchdown to again cut the Bulldog lead to ten points. On Georgia's next drive, although the Bulldogs drove all the way to the Rebel 23-yard line, on third-and-six they fumbled the ball to Ole Miss with the Rebels recovering at their 31. But despite the real opportunity for Ole Miss to get back in the game with a little over six minutes left, after gaining eight yards in two plays, the Rebels surrendered a two-yard loss on a running play off right guard, and on the next play on fourth down threw an interception returned to their own 48. Although Georgia on their subsequent drive would be called for delay-of-game on first down and pushed back five yards to the Ole Miss twenty-eight, giving Ole Miss a real shot at stopping the Bulldogs and staying in the game, the Rebels then surrendered a four and then a twenty-one-yard run to Hampton and the Bulldogs, and Georgia would soon score a one-yard touchdown just before the end of the game to win 31–14. Aided by a few important Georgia mistakes, Ole Miss this time would lose by less than fifteen points more than the point-spread (they were a six-point underdog entering the game); but considering that Hampton had never started a game at UGA before that day and on the Rebel home field, he amassed a school-record of 290 all purpose yards (227 rushing, 28 receiving, 35 kickoff return) that broke Herschel Walker's previous record of 283 yards in 1980 (and a record that would not be broken at Georgia until twenty-seven years later), and that in the words of one sportswriter "Georgia missed (Lars) Tate the way the New York Yankees missed Wally Pipp", to many fans, the game was as good as a debacle.

For their next game, the Rebels traveled to Lexington, Kentucky to face the Kentucky Wildcats, who Ole Miss defeated 33-13 the previous year. After Ole Miss was hit with both a clipping and illegal motion penalty to kill their first drive, Kentucky drove behind the running of Mark Higgs from their own 43-yard line to the Ole Miss 15. But they missed a 32-yard field goal. But although Ole Miss drove from there to the Kentucky 31, they could not make the Wildcats pay for their mistake, missing a 49-yard field goal of their own. And three possessions later, Higgs gained 47 yards on a fake reverse play to the Ole Miss three. But on the very next play, he fumbled there and Rebel linebacker Jeff Herrod recovered the fumble in mid-air and returned it to the Ole Miss 32-yard line. But as with the missed field goal, the Rebels did not capitalize on the critical mistake, as Young threw an interception on second-and-long that was returned to the Ole Miss 35. Kentucky soon cashed-in the mistake with a 48-yard field goal, and one Mississippi sports writer would shortly after say that afterwards the Rebels "quite frankly, quit." Three possessions after that, Ole Miss got off a punt of only 27 yards with a six-yard return (for a net of just 21 yards), and it took Kentucky just three plays to go 56 yards; with Higgs getting the final 22 on a touchdown run. The Rebels couldn't move on their next possession, and the Wildcats got the ball at their own 34 and took eleven plays to go 66 yards with UK receiver Dee Smith getting the touchdown on a leaping six-yard catch. The Wildcats missed the extra-point, but they went into the half with a sixteen-point lead.

The second half did not open well for Ole Miss, as they surrendered a 35-yard return on the kickoff to the UK 41, and from there the Wildcats drove to the Rebel 34. But Kentucky then missed a 49-yard field goal. Again, Ole Miss could not take advantage of a Kentucky mistake, driving eleven yards before being forced to punt. After the punt, they were penalized 15 yards for a deadball personal foul penalty all the way to their own 48-yard line. Higgs then gained 24, then two yards on running plays to the Ole Miss 22. Once again, Kentucky committed a critical turnover, throwing an interception at the Rebel two-yard line. But even more critically, Ole Miss yet again could not capitalize on a Wildcat mistake. After driving from their two to the Kentucky 45, Young threw a pass that was batted in the air by Carwell Gardner, then caught by Tony Massey and returned 22 yards for a touchdown. The two-point conversion attempt was no good, but the Wildcats in a devastating turn-of-events were now up by three scores over Ole Miss. The next three possessions of the game were uneventful, but the Rebels would surrender a punt return of 34 yards to their own 23 that Kentucky would turn into a 49-yard field goal. On the first play of Ole Miss next possession, Young would throw another pass that was deflected and intercepted at the Rebel 40. On the first play after that, Higgs would run around left end for his final touchdown of the game. Two possessions later, Ole Miss would fumble a punt return at their own 20 that UK recovered at the Rebel eleven. The Wildcats would then kick a 27-yard field goal for their final points of the night. Three possessions later, Ole Miss got on the scoreboard when quarterback John Darnell, who had entered the game after Young's last interception, scored on a two-yard touchdown run on a keeper to make the final score 35–6. The Rebels, a six-point underdog entering the game, underperformed the point-spread, in spite of the aforementioned Kentucky errors, by 23 points, the fourth time to that point in the season they did fifteen or more points worse than the spread. Not only that, but for the third straight week, the Rebel defense (then under new leadership for the first time in four years) that led the SEC in total defense in 1986 surrendered 94 points and over 1,300 yards in total offense. A sportswriter covering the game would afterwards say "The terminally morbid out there should get a kick out of this one. In eleven regular season games in 1986, the Rebels allowed 150 points. Six games into this go-round, the total is 154." Soon after that, that same sportwriter would refer to it as "Rock Bottom" for the Rebels.

Following the game, Coach Brewer would cause considerable controversy with quotes made. Apparently ignoring breaks that went his teams way, especially in the last three games up to that point he said "I have been coaching a long time, but I have never coached a team that has had as many bad things happen to it as this one. It's the damndest thing I've ever seen." One sportswriter would refer to that line as "as bogus as one you'd hear in a singles bar." Another would say "Painfully simple as it may sound, this Ole Miss team isn't very good. In fact, this Ole Miss team is pretty bad. It's time for someone--Brewer or one of his players--to admit it. . .The Rebs should forget the excuses. They're getting awfully tiresome and holding less weight with each loss. He would also give the impression to many of being disingenuous, deflecting blame and avoiding accountability for the teams problems by saying in response to an open-letter ad in the university student paper calling for his firing "You don't know how many hours of preparation the staff puts into each game. All the coaching staff can do is to get the players into a position to win and then it is out of our hands."

A week later, the Rebels returned to Oxford for a game against the Southwestern Louisiana Ragin' Cajuns. Playing in front of an estimated crowd of only 18,700 in nice weather, Ole Miss jumped out to a 17–0 lead, but botched opportunities for the Rebels led to just a 17–7 lead until 4:21 left in the game, when Darnell connected on a 44-yard touchdown pass to Green. USL made the game semi-interesting with a short touchdown run with 1:38 left, but Ole Miss recovered the onside kick, and was able to pick up its second victory of the season.

The next week, on homecoming, the Rebels would record their second win in a row and first SEC win of the year, defeating Watson Brown (American football) coached Vanderbilt 42–14. Both offensively and defensively, it was a good showing for Ole Miss; but the Rebels did not clean up their turnover problems, losing four fumbles out of five total. However, the Commodores were worse, fumbling three times and throwing two interceptions. Four of five Ole Miss touchdowns resulted from those turnovers. Vanderbilt also hurt their cause by going for it on fourth down twice in the first half and being stopped. After the victory, Ole Miss players had considerable optimism going into their next game with archrival LSU.

== Schedule ==
Date	Time	Opponent	Site	Result	Attendance	Source
September 5	7:00 pm	at Memphis State*	Liberty Bowl Memorial Stadium; Memphis, TN (rivalry)	L 10–16	64,187	
September 12	6:00 pm	No. 13 Arkansas*	Mississippi Veterans Memorial Stadium; Jackson, MS (rivalry)	L 10–31	57,900	
September 19	1:00 pm	Arkansas State*	Vaught–Hemingway Stadium; Oxford, MS	W 47–10	24,000	
September 26	7:00 pm	at Tulane*	Louisiana Superdome; New Orleans, LA (rivalry)	L 24–31	40,302	
October 3	1:00 pm	No. 20 Georgia	Vaught–Hemingway Stadium; Oxford, MS	L 14–31	32,000	
October 10	7:00 pm	at Kentucky	Commonwealth Stadium; Lexington, KY	L 6–35	57,832	
October 17	1:00 pm	Southwestern Louisiana*	Vaught–Hemingway Stadium; Oxford, MS	W 24–14	18,700	
October 24	1:00 pm	Vanderbilt^{†}	Vaught–Hemingway Stadium; Oxford, MS (rivalry)	W 42–14	31,000	
October 31	6:00 pm	No. 5 LSU	Mississippi Veterans Memorial Stadium; Jackson, MS (rivalry)	L 13–42	56,500	
November 14	2:00 pm	at No. 18 Tennessee	Neyland Stadium; Knoxville, TN (rivalry)	L 13–55	94,237	
November 21	1:00 pm	vs. Mississippi State	Mississippi Veterans Memorial Stadium; Jackson, MS (Egg Bowl)	L 20–30	43,500	
*Non-conference game; ^{†}Homecoming; Rankings from AP Poll released prior to the game

== Roster ==
1987 Ole Miss Rebels football team roster
Players
Coaches
Offense

Pos.	#	Name	Class
OL		Rich Adamcik
WR	6	J.R. Ambrose	Sr
WR		David Caldwell
RB		Chuck Cleveland
QB		John Darnell
RB		Willie Goodloe
WR	1	Willie Green	So
WR		Reid Hines
WR		Jeffrey Holder
TE		Robert Holladay
OL		Danny Hoskins
OL		Todd Irvin
OL		Derek King
OL		James King
TE		Greg Lee
WR		Bobby Martin
RB		Gerald McAllister
RB		Ronnie McKinney
OL		Dawson Pruett
OL		Jay Schimmel
TE		Shawn Sowder
RB		Shawn Sykes
RB		Ed Thigpen
RB		Jim Earl Thomas
QB	14	Mark Young	Jr

Defense

Pos.	#	Name	Class
LB	89	Tony Bennett	So
DL		Lester Brinkley
LB		Shawn Cobb
LB		Bubba Dickey
LB	66	Jeff Herrod	Sr
DL		Lopaz Jones
DB		Derrick Lindsay
DB		Chris Mitchell
DB		Stevon Moore
DB		Howard Moss
DB		Don Price
DB		Todd Sandroni
DL		Arthur Scott
DL		Darryl Smith
LB		Robert Smith
DE	80	Wesley Walls	Jr
DL		Dan Wigley

Special teams

Pos.	#	Name	Class
P		Charles Childers

Head coach

- Billy Brewer

Coordinators/assistant coaches

- Keith Daniels
  (Running backs coach)

Legend

- (C) Team captain
- (S) Suspended
- (I) Ineligible
- Injured
- Redshirt
