= 1987 Mississippi State Bulldogs football team =

American college football season

1987 Mississippi State Bulldogs football
- Conference: Southeastern Conference
- Record: 4–7 (1–5 SEC)
- Head coach: Rockey Felker (2nd season)
- Defensive coordinator: Ronnie Gray (2nd season)
- Home stadium: Scott Field

1987 Southeastern Conference football standings
	Conf.					Overall
Team	W		L		T	W		L		T
No. 7 Auburn $	5	–	0	–	1	9	–	1	–	2
No. 5 LSU	5	–	1	–	0	10	–	1	–	1
No. 14 Tennessee	4	–	1	–	1	10	–	2	–	1
No. 13 Georgia	4	–	2	–	0	9	–	3	–	0
Alabama	4	–	2	–	0	7	–	5	–	0
Florida	3	–	3	–	0	6	–	6	–	0
Kentucky	1	–	5	–	0	5	–	6	–	0
Mississippi State	1	–	5	–	0	4	–	7	–	0
Vanderbilt	1	–	5	–	0	4	–	7	–	0
Ole Miss	1	–	5	–	0	3	–	8	–	0
$ – Conference champion; Rankings from AP Poll

The 1987 Mississippi State Bulldogs football team represented Mississippi State University as member of the Southeastern Conference (SEC) during the 1987 NCAA Division I-A football season. Led by second-year head coach Rockey Felker, the Bulldogs compiled a record of 4–7, with a mark of 1–5 in conference play, and finished tied for seventh in the SEC.

== Schedule ==
Date	Opponent	Site	Result	Attendance	Source
September 5	Southwestern Louisiana*	Scott Field; Starkville, MS	W 31–3	26,580	
September 12	No. 14 Tennessee	Scott Field; Starkville, MS	L 10–38	30,312	
September 19	Louisiana Tech*	Scott Field; Starkville, MS	W 14–13	23,200	
September 26	at Florida	Florida Field; Gainesville, FL	L 3–38	74,421	
October 3	Memphis State*	Scott Field; Starkville, MS	W 9–6	37,264	
October 17	vs. Southern Miss*	Mississippi Veterans Memorial Stadium; Jackson, MS	L 14–18	40,000	
October 24	at No. 6 Auburn	Jordan-Hare Stadium; Auburn, AL	L 7–38	79,900	
October 31	at No. 16 Alabama	Legion Field; Birmingham, AL (rivalry)	L 18–21	73,877	
November 7	Tulane*	Scott Field; Starkville, MS	L 19–30	23,647	
November 14	at No. 10 LSU	Tiger Stadium; Baton Rouge, LA (rivalry)	L 14–34	79,258	
November 21	vs. Ole Miss	Mississippi Veterans Memorial Stadium; Jackson, MS (Egg Bowl)	W 30–20	43,500	
*Non-conference game; Rankings from AP Poll released prior to the game
