= 1987 Aloha Bowl =

American college football game

1987 Jeep-Eagle Aloha Bowl
UCLA Bruins	Florida Gators
(9–2)	(6–5)
20	16
Head coach: Terry Donahue	Head coach: Galen Hall
AP / Coaches; 10 / 10
	1	2	3	4	Total
UCLA	3	7	7	3	20
Florida	7	3	0	6	16
- Date: December 25, 1987
- Season: 1987
- Stadium: Aloha Stadium
- Location: Honolulu, Hawaii
- MVP: Troy Aikman (UCLA); Emmitt Smith (Florida)
- Referee: Mike Pereira (PCAA; split crew: PCAA, SWC)
- Attendance: 24,839

United States TV coverage
- Network: ABC
- Announcers: Keith Jackson and Bob Griese

The 1987 Jeep-Eagle Aloha Bowl was a college football bowl game, played as part of the 1987-88 bowl game schedule of the 1987 NCAA Division I-A football season. It was the sixth Aloha Bowl. It was played on December 25, 1987, at Aloha Stadium in Honolulu, Hawaii. The game matched the Florida Gators of the Southeastern Conference against the UCLA Bruins of the Pac-10 Conference. The Bruins were led by quarterback Troy Aikman.

== Scoring summary ==
=== First quarter ===
- UCLA – Alfredo Velasco 34-yard field goal
- UF – Kerwin Bell to Stacey Simmons 7-yard pass (Robert McGinty kick)

=== Second quarter ===
- UF – McGinty 32-yard field goal
- UCLA – Brian Brown 1-yard run (Velasco kick)

=== Third quarter ===
- UCLA – Troy Aikman to Danny Thompson 5-yard pass (Velasco kick)

=== Fourth quarter ===
- UCLA – Velasco 32-yard field goal
- UF – Bell to Anthony Williams 14 pass (kick blocked)

=== Statistics ===
Statistics	UCLA	Florida
First downs	15	24
Total offense, plays - yards	71–221	76–373
Rushes-yards (net)	41–48	38–185
Passing yards (net)	173	188
Passes, Comp-Att-Int	30–19–2	38–19–0

Individual Leaders

- Rushing: UCLA – Ball 23-49, Brown 10-29; FLA – Smith 17-128, Williams 8-43.
- Passing: UCLA – Aikman 19-30-2-173-1 TD; FLA – Bell 19-38-0-188-2 TD.
- Receiving: UCLA – Anderson 4-52, Pickert 3-37; FLA – Snead 3-62, Odom 3-32, Simmons 3-20
