= 1987 Kentucky Wildcats football team =

American college football season

1987 Kentucky Wildcats football
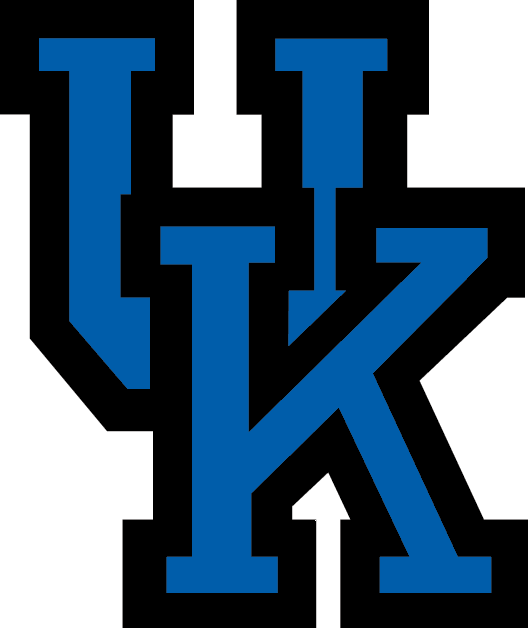
- Conference: Southeastern Conference
- Record: 5–6 (1–5 SEC)
- Head coach: Jerry Claiborne (6th season)
- Home stadium: Commonwealth Stadium

1987 Southeastern Conference football standings
	Conf.					Overall
Team	W		L		T	W		L		T
No. 7 Auburn $	5	–	0	–	1	9	–	1	–	2
No. 5 LSU	5	–	1	–	0	10	–	1	–	1
No. 14 Tennessee	4	–	1	–	1	10	–	2	–	1
No. 13 Georgia	4	–	2	–	0	9	–	3	–	0
Alabama	4	–	2	–	0	7	–	5	–	0
Florida	3	–	3	–	0	6	–	6	–	0
Kentucky	1	–	5	–	0	5	–	6	–	0
Mississippi State	1	–	5	–	0	4	–	7	–	0
Vanderbilt	1	–	5	–	0	4	–	7	–	0
Ole Miss	1	–	5	–	0	3	–	8	–	0
$ – Conference champion; Rankings from AP Poll

The 1987 Kentucky Wildcats football team represented the University of Kentucky in the Southeastern Conference (SEC) during the 1987 NCAA Division I-A football season. In their sixth season under head coach Jerry Claiborne, the Wildcats compiled a 5–6 record (1–5 against SEC opponents), finished in a tie for seventh place in the SEC, and outscored their opponents, 258 to 187. The team played its home games in Commonwealth Stadium in Lexington, Kentucky.

The team's statistical leaders included Glenn Fohr with 973 passing yards, Mark Higgs with 1,278 rushing yards, and Dee Smith with 420 receiving yards.

== Schedule ==
Date	Opponent	Site	Result	Attendance	Source
September 12	Utah State*	Commonwealth Stadium; Lexington, KY	W 41–0	55,249	
September 19	Indiana*	Commonwealth Stadium; Lexington, KY (rivalry)	W 34–15	57,924	
September 26	at Rutgers*	Giants Stadium; East Rutherford, NJ	L 18–19	21,232	
October 3	Ohio*	Commonwealth Stadium; Lexington, KY	W 28–0	53,329	
October 10	Ole Miss	Commonwealth Stadium; Lexington, KY	W 35–6	57,832	
October 17	at No. 6 LSU	Tiger Stadium; Baton Rouge, LA	L 9–34	77,084	
October 24	at No. 12 Georgia	Sanford Stadium; Athens, GA	L 14–17	81,911	
October 31	Virginia Tech*	Commonwealth Stadium; Lexington, KY	W 14–7	50,432	
November 7	at Vanderbilt	Vanderbilt Stadium; Nashville, TN (rivalry)	L 29–38	40,892	
November 14	at Florida	Florida Field; Gainesville, FL (rivalry)	L 14–27	73,021	
November 21	No. 15 Tennessee	Commonwealth Stadium; Lexington, KY (rivalry)	L 22–24	57,127	
*Non-conference game; Rankings from Coaches' Poll released prior to the game

== Roster ==
1987 Kentucky Wildcats football team roster
Players
Coaches
Offense

Pos.	#	Name	Class
G	57	Dermontti Dawson	Sr
RB	22	Mark Higgs	Sr
RB	32	Ivy Joe Hunter	Jr

Defense

Pos.	#	Name	Class
DT	79	Oliver Barnett	So
DT	70	Tom Howard	Sr
CB	24	D. J. Johnson	Jr
DT	54	Jerry Reese	Sr
DT	91	John Shannon	Sr

Special teams

Pos.	#	Name	Class

Head coach

- Jerry Claiborne

Coordinators/assistant coaches

Legend

- (C) Team captain
- (S) Suspended
- (I) Ineligible
- Injured
- Redshirt
