= 1987 Gator Bowl =

1987 Mazda Gator Bowl
| South Carolina Gamecocks | LSU Tigers |
| (8–3) | (9–1–1) |
| Independent | SEC |
| 13 | 30 |
| Head coach: Joe Morrison | Head coach: Mike Archer |
| AP / Coaches; 9 / 9 | AP / Coaches; 7 / 7 |
| | 1 | 2 | 3 | 4 | Total |
|---|---|---|---|---|---|
| South Carolina | 3 | 3 | 0 | 7 | 13 |
| LSU | 14 | 6 | 7 | 3 | 30 |
- Date: December 31, 1987
- Season: 1987
- Stadium: Gator Bowl Stadium
- Location: Jacksonville, Florida
- MVP: WR Wendell Davis, LSU; RB Harold Green, South Carolina
- Referee: Robert C. Wood III (ACC)
- Attendance: 82,119

United States TV coverage
- Network: CBS
- Announcers: Verne Lundquist, Dick Vermeil

The 1987 Gator Bowl was a college football bowl game between the South Carolina Gamecocks and the LSU Tigers. LSU defeated South Carolina, 30–13.

== Background ==
South Carolina competed as an independent and was tied for fourth-best record among independent schools. LSU finished second in the Southeastern Conference (SEC). The game would be vaunted as a matchup between the "Black Death" defense of SC versus the prolific pro-style LSU offense led by Tommy Hodson at QB and Wendell Davis, one of the best wideouts in all of college football.

== Game summary ==
=== First quarter ===
- LSU – Wendell Davis, 39-yard pass from Tommy Hodson (David Browndyke kick)
- LSU – Davis, 12-yard pass from Hodson (Browndyke kick)
- South Carolina – Collin Mackie, 44-yard field goal

=== Second quarter ===
- LSU – Browndyke, 27-yard field goal
- South Carolina – Mackie, 39-yard field goal
- LSU – Browndyke, 18-yard field goal

=== Third quarter ===
- LSU – Davis, 25-yard pass from Hodson (Browndyke kick)

=== Fourth quarter ===
- South Carolina – Harold Green, 10-yard run (Mackie kick)
- LSU – Browndyke, 23-yard field goal

== Statistics ==
| Statistics | South Carolina | LSU |
|---|---|---|
| First downs | 21 | 17 |
| Rushing yards | 25 | 122 |
| Passing yards | 304 | 224 |
| Total yards | 329 | 346 |
| Passes (Att-Comp-Int) | 47–28–4 | 32–20–0 |
| Punts–average | 2–40.5 | 3–37.6 |
| Fumbles–lost | 2–1 | 5–3 |
| Penalties–yards | 6–49 | 10–107 |

== Aftermath ==
South Carolina was invited to join the Southeastern Conference in 1990, and began playing football in their new conference in 1992. The Gamecocks and Tigers first met as SEC opponents in 1994 at Baton Rouge. South Carolina won that game 18-17, but is 0-7-1 vs. LSU since.
