= 1987 Florida Gators football team =

American college football season

1987 Florida Gators football

Aloha Bowl, L 16–20 vs. UCLA
- Conference: Southeastern Conference
- Record: 6–6 (3–3 SEC)
- Head coach: Galen Hall (4th season)
- Defensive coordinator: Zaven Yaralian (2nd season)
- Home stadium: Florida Field

1987 Southeastern Conference football standings
	Conf.					Overall
Team	W		L		T	W		L		T
No. 7 Auburn $	5	–	0	–	1	9	–	1	–	2
No. 5 LSU	5	–	1	–	0	10	–	1	–	1
No. 14 Tennessee	4	–	1	–	1	10	–	2	–	1
No. 13 Georgia	4	–	2	–	0	9	–	3	–	0
Alabama	4	–	2	–	0	7	–	5	–	0
Florida	3	–	3	–	0	6	–	6	–	0
Kentucky	1	–	5	–	0	5	–	6	–	0
Mississippi State	1	–	5	–	0	4	–	7	–	0
Vanderbilt	1	–	5	–	0	4	–	7	–	0
Ole Miss	1	–	5	–	0	3	–	8	–	0
$ – Conference champion; Rankings from AP Poll

The 1987 Florida Gators football team represented the University of Florida during the 1987 NCAA Division I-A football season. The season was the fourth for Galen Hall as the head coach of the Florida Gators football team. Hall's 1987 Florida Gators posted a 6–6 overall record and a Southeastern Conference (SEC) record of 3–3, placing sixth among ten SEC teams.

The season was the debut of freshman running back Emmitt Smith. Smith went on to break the 1,000-yard barrier in the seventh game of his freshman season, the fastest any running back had ever broken that barrier to begin his college career, and was named SEC and national freshman of the year. This was the last year until 2017 that Florida opened the season away from Gainesville.

== Schedule ==
Date	Opponent	Rank	Site	TV	Result	Attendance	Source
September 5	at No. 10 Miami (FL)*	No. 20	Miami Orange Bowl; Miami, FL (rivalry)	TBS	L 4–31	77,224	
September 12	Tulsa*		Florida Field; Gainesville, FL		W 52–0	72,173	
September 19	at No. 11 Alabama		Legion Field; Birmingham, AL (rivalry)	TBS	W 23–14	75,808	
September 26	Mississippi State		Florida Field; Gainesville, FL		W 38–3	74,421	
October 3	at No. 7 LSU	No. 19	Tiger Stadium; Baton Rouge, LA (rivalry)	ESPN	L 10–13	79,313	
October 10	Cal State Fullerton*	No. 18	Florida Field; Gainesville, FL		W 65–0	72,336	
October 17	Temple*^{†}	No. 14	Florida Field; Gainesville, FL		W 34–3	74,286	
October 31	at No. 6 Auburn	No. 10	Jordan-Hare Stadium; Auburn, AL (rivalry)	ESPN	L 6–29	85,187	
November 7	vs. No. 10 Georgia	No. 17	Gator Bowl Stadium; Jacksonville, FL (rivalry)	TBS	L 10–23	81,975	
November 14	Kentucky		Florida Field; Gainesville, FL (rivalry)	TBS	W 27–14	73,021	
November 28	No. 3 Florida State*		Florida Field; Gainesville, FL (rivalry)	CBS	L 14–28	74,613	
December 25	vs. No. 10 UCLA*		Aloha Stadium; Halawa, HI (Aloha Bowl)	ABC	L 16–20	24,839	
*Non-conference game; ^{†}Homecoming; Rankings from AP Poll released prior to the game; Source:

== Personnel ==
1987 Florida Gators football team roster
Players
Coaches
Offense

Pos.	#	Name	Class
QB	12	Kerwin Bell	Sr
OL		Chris Bromley
TE		Kelvin Calhoun
OL		Tracy Daniels
OL		Jimmy Davis
WR		Ed Frazier
RB		Octavius Gould
TE		Kirk Kirkpatrick
QB		Pepe Lescano
WR		Tony Lomack
RB		James Massey
RB		Willie McGrady
TE		Mark McGriff
WR		Ernie Mills	Fr
TE		Walter Odom
RB		Darryl Perry
QB, P		Herbert Perry
TE		Clifton Reynolds
WR		Stacey Simmons
OL		Bob Sims
RB		Cedric Smith
RB	22	Emmitt Smith	Fr
WR		Willie Snead
OL		Richard Starowesky
RB		Curtis White
RB		Anthony Williams
OL		David Williams
RB		Wayne Williams
WR		Darrell Woulard
OL		Charlie Wright

Defense

Pos.	#	Name	Class
DL		Henry Brown
LB		Clifford Charlton
DB		Richard Fain
DB		Tony Jones
LB		Todd Gatlin
LB		Jason Lamberth
LB		Pat Moorer
DB		Rick Mulberry
LB		Mark Murray
DL		Glenn Neely
LB		Jim Nicoletto
LB		Gerry Odom
DB		Louis Oliver
LB		Huey Richardson	Fr
DL		Jeff Roth
DB		Kerry Watkins
DL		Rhondy Weston
DB		Jarvis Williams

Special teams

Pos.	#	Name	Class
K		Andy Elton
P		Jamie McAndrew
K		Robert McGinty	Sr

Head coach

- Galen Hall

Coordinators/assistant coaches

- Zaven Yaralian (DC)
- Mike Heimerdinger (WR)

Legend

- (C) Team captain
- (S) Suspended
- (I) Ineligible
- Injured
- Redshirt

== Rankings ==
Ranking movements Legend: ██ Increase in ranking ██ Decrease in ranking — = Not ranked RV = Received votes т = Tied with team above or below
	Week															
Poll	Pre	1	2	3	4	5	6	7	8	9	10	11	12	13	14	Final
AP	20 т	—	—	—	19	18	14	11	10	17	—	RV	RV	—	—	—
Coaches	20	—	—	15	18	19	14	11	11	18	—	—	—	—	—	—
