= 1987 NCAA Division I-A football season =

American college football season

1987 NCAA Division I-A season
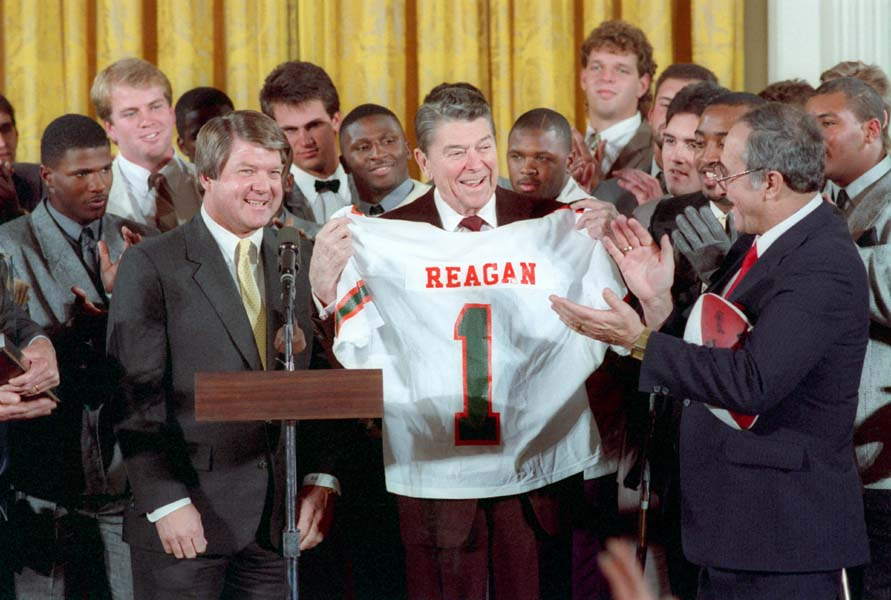
- President Ronald Reagan holds up a Miami Hurricanes jersey presented to him by head coach Jimmy Johnson and the 1987 Miami Hurricanes football team after winning the national championship.
- Number of teams: 104
- Preseason AP No. 1: Oklahoma

Postseason
- Bowl games: 18
- Heisman Trophy: Notre Dame wide receiver Tim Brown
- Champion(s): Miami (FL) (AP, Coaches, FWAA)

Division I-A football seasons
- ← 1986 1988 →

The 1987 NCAA Division I-A football season ended with Miami (FL) winning its second national championship of the 1980s in an Orange Bowl game featuring a rare No. 1 vs. No. 2 matchup between the top ranked Oklahoma Sooners and the Hurricanes.

Miami's first three games were against ranked opponents in what was labeled a rebuilding year. After some late game theatrics by Michael Irvin against rival Florida State, the Hurricanes were 3–0, the national media started to take notice.

Oklahoma was also seen as quite the juggernaut, averaging 428.8 yards rushing per game with their potent wishbone offense. Miami was able to hold Oklahoma to just 179 yards on the ground, winning the game 20–14.

Also having notable seasons were Syracuse, LSU and Florida State. Syracuse finished the season 11–0–1 and ranked No. 4 after a controversial Sugar Bowl game in which Auburn kicked a late field goal to end the game in a tie. LSU went 10–1–1, ending the season ranked No. 5. This was LSU's first ten win season in 26 years and their highest ranking since 1961.

Florida State finished ranked No. 2, their only loss to Miami, and began a streak of 14 years where FSU finished in the top 5. The Seminoles beat Rose Bowl champion Michigan State and SEC champion Auburn on the road and beat Nebraska in the Fiesta Bowl.

This would be the first of two years SMU would not field a team due to the NCAA's death penalty.

== Rule changes ==
- If a roughing the passer penalty occurs on a completed pass, the 15-yard penalty is added to the end of the run.
- Pushing an opponent in the back in the act of recovering a kick is permitted.
- Kicking or swinging at an opponent and missing are considered personal fouls instead of non-contact fouls.
- Uprights now must be 30 feet above the crossbar, same as in the NFL.

== Conference and program changes ==
- This was the first season Akron was a Division I-A football member.
- Wichita State discontinued their football program after the 1986 season and have never fielded a team since then.
- SMU did not field a team this year due to the NCAA's death penalty.

The loss of Wichita State and SMU and the gain of Akron decreased the number of teams to 104.

School	1986 Conference	1987 Conference
Akron Zips	Ohio Valley (I-AA)	I-A Independent
SMU	Southwest	No Program
Wichita State Shockers	I-A Independent	Program Dropped

== Conference standings ==
1987 Atlantic Coast Conference football standings
	Conf.					Overall
Team	W		L		T	W		L		T
No. 12 Clemson $	6	–	1	–	0	10	–	2	–	0
Virginia	5	–	2	–	0	8	–	4	–	0
Wake Forest	4	–	3	–	0	7	–	4	–	0
NC State	4	–	3	–	0	4	–	7	–	0
Maryland	3	–	3	–	0	4	–	7	–	0
North Carolina	3	–	4	–	0	5	–	6	–	0
Duke	2	–	5	–	0	5	–	6	–	0
Georgia Tech	0	–	6	–	0	2	–	9	–	0
$ – Conference champion; Rankings from AP Poll

1987 Big Eight Conference football standings
	Conf.					Overall
Team	W		L		T	W		L		T
No. 3 Oklahoma $	7	–	0	–	0	11	–	1	–	0
No. 6 Nebraska	6	–	1	–	0	10	–	2	–	0
No. 11 Oklahoma State	5	–	2	–	0	10	–	2	–	0
Colorado	4	–	3	–	0	7	–	4	–	0
Missouri	3	–	4	–	0	5	–	6	–	0
Iowa State	2	–	5	–	0	3	–	8	–	0
Kansas	0	–	6	–	1	1	–	9	–	1
Kansas State	0	–	6	–	1	0	–	10	–	1
$ – Conference champion; Rankings from AP Poll

1987 Big Ten Conference football standings
	Conf.					Overall
Team	W		L		T	W		L		T
No. 8 Michigan State $	7	–	0	–	1	9	–	2	–	1
No. 16 Iowa	6	–	2	–	0	10	–	3	–	0
Indiana	6	–	2	–	0	8	–	4	–	0
No. 19 Michigan	5	–	3	–	0	8	–	4	–	0
Ohio State	4	–	4	–	0	6	–	4	–	1
Minnesota	3	–	5	–	0	6	–	5	–	0
Purdue	3	–	5	–	0	3	–	7	–	1
Illinois	2	–	5	–	1	3	–	7	–	1
Northwestern	2	–	6	–	0	2	–	8	–	1
Wisconsin	1	–	7	–	0	3	–	8	–	0
$ – Conference champion; Rankings from AP Poll

1987 Mid-American Conference football standings
	Conf.					Overall
Team	W		L		T	W		L		T
Eastern Michigan $	7	–	1	–	0	10	–	2	–	0
Kent State	5	–	3	–	0	7	–	4	–	0
Miami (OH)	5	–	3	–	0	5	–	6	–	0
Bowling Green	5	–	3	–	0	5	–	6	–	0
Western Michigan	4	–	4	–	0	5	–	6	–	0
Central Michigan	3	–	4	–	1	5	–	5	–	1
Toledo	3	–	4	–	1	3	–	7	–	1
Ball State	3	–	5	–	0	4	–	7	–	0
Ohio	0	–	8	–	0	1	–	10	–	0
$ – Conference champion

1987 Pacific Coast Athletic Association football standings
	Conf.					Overall
Team	W		L		T	W		L		T
San Jose State $	7	–	0	–	0	10	–	2	–	0
Fresno State	4	–	3	–	0	6	–	5	–	0
Cal State Fullerton	4	–	3	–	0	6	–	6	–	0
UNLV	4	–	3	–	0	5	–	6	–	0
Utah State	4	–	3	–	0	5	–	6	–	0
Pacific (CA)	3	–	4	–	0	4	–	7	–	0
Long Beach State	2	–	5	–	0	4	–	7	–	0
New Mexico State	0	–	7	–	0	2	–	9	–	0
$ – Conference champion

1987 Pacific-10 Conference football standings
	Conf.					Overall
Team	W		L		T	W		L		T
No. 9 UCLA +	7	–	1	–	0	10	–	2	–	0
No. 18 USC +	7	–	1	–	0	8	–	4	–	0
Washington	4	–	3	–	1	7	–	4	–	1
No. 20 Arizona State	3	–	3	–	1	7	–	4	–	1
Oregon	4	–	4	–	0	6	–	5	–	0
Stanford	4	–	4	–	0	5	–	6	–	0
Arizona	2	–	3	–	3	4	–	4	–	3
California	2	–	3	–	2	3	–	6	–	2
Washington State	1	–	5	–	1	3	–	7	–	1
Oregon State	0	–	7	–	0	2	–	9	–	0
+ – Conference co-champions; Rankings from AP Poll

1987 Southeastern Conference football standings
	Conf.					Overall
Team	W		L		T	W		L		T
No. 7 Auburn $	5	–	0	–	1	9	–	1	–	2
No. 5 LSU	5	–	1	–	0	10	–	1	–	1
No. 14 Tennessee	4	–	1	–	1	10	–	2	–	1
No. 13 Georgia	4	–	2	–	0	9	–	3	–	0
Alabama	4	–	2	–	0	7	–	5	–	0
Florida	3	–	3	–	0	6	–	6	–	0
Kentucky	1	–	5	–	0	5	–	6	–	0
Mississippi State	1	–	5	–	0	4	–	7	–	0
Vanderbilt	1	–	5	–	0	4	–	7	–	0
Ole Miss	1	–	5	–	0	3	–	8	–	0
$ – Conference champion; Rankings from AP Poll

1987 Southwest Conference football standings
	Conf.					Overall
Team	W		L		T	W		L		T
No. 10 Texas A&M $	6	–	1	–	0	10	–	2	–	0
Arkansas	5	–	2	–	0	9	–	4	–	0
Texas	5	–	2	–	0	7	–	5	–	0
Texas Tech	3	–	3	–	1	6	–	4	–	1
Baylor	3	–	4	–	0	6	–	5	–	0
TCU	3	–	4	–	0	5	–	6	–	0
Houston	2	–	4	–	1	4	–	6	–	1
Rice	0	–	8	–	0	2	–	9	–	0
$ – Conference champion; Rankings from AP Poll

1987 Western Athletic Conference football standings
	Conf.					Overall
Team	W		L		T	W		L		T
Wyoming $	8	–	0	–	0	10	–	3	–	0
BYU	7	–	1	–	0	9	–	4	–	0
Air Force	6	–	2	–	0	9	–	4	–	0
UTEP	5	–	3	–	0	7	–	4	–	0
San Diego State	4	–	4	–	0	5	–	7	–	0
Hawaii	3	–	5	–	0	5	–	7	–	0
Utah	2	–	6	–	0	5	–	7	–	0
Colorado State	1	–	7	–	0	1	–	11	–	0
New Mexico	0	–	8	–	0	0	–	11	–	0
$ – Conference champion

1987 NCAA Division I-A independents football records
	Conf.					Overall
Team	W		L		T	W		L		T
No. 1 Miami (FL)		–		–		12	–	0	–	0
No. 4 Syracuse		–		–		11	–	0	–	1
No. 2 Florida State		–		–		11	–	1	–	0
No. 15 South Carolina		–		–		8	–	4	–	0
Pittsburgh		–		–		8	–	4	–	0
Penn State		–		–		8	–	4	–	0
No. 17 Notre Dame		–		–		8	–	4	–	0
Southern Miss		–		–		6	–	5	–	0
Rutgers		–		–		6	–	5	–	0
Southwestern Louisiana		–		–		6	–	5	–	0
Memphis State		–		–		5	–	5	–	1
Northern Illinois		–		–		5	–	5	–	1
West Virginia		–		–		6	–	6	–	0
Tulane		–		–		6	–	6	–	0
Army		–		–		5	–	6	–	0
Boston College		–		–		5	–	6	–	0
East Carolina		–		–		5	–	6	–	0
Akron		–		–		4	–	7	–	0
Cincinnati		–		–		4	–	7	–	0
Louisville		–		–		3	–	7	–	1
Temple		–		–		3	–	8	–	0
Tulsa		–		–		3	–	8	–	0
Virginia Tech		–		–		2	–	9	–	0
Navy		–		–		2	–	9	–	0
Rankings from AP Poll

== I-AA team wins over I-A teams ==
Italics denotes I-AA teams.

Date	Visiting team	Home team	Site	Result	Attendance	Ref.
September 5	Austin Peay	Kansas State	KSU Stadium • Manhattan, Kansas	26–22	23,350	
September 12	No. 4 (I-AA) Holy Cross	Army	Michie Stadium • West Point, New York	34–24	38,428	
September 12	Western Michigan	Illinois State	Hancock Stadium • Normal, Illinois	6–20		
September 12	Lamar	Northern Illinois	Huskie Stadium • DeKalb, Illinois	39–35	22,184	
September 12	No. 17 (I-AA) William & Mary	Navy	Navy–Marine Corps Memorial Stadium • Annapolis, Maryland	27–12		
September 12	Youngstown State	Bowling Green	Doyt Perry Stadium • Bowling Green, Ohio	20–17	10,000	
September 19	Lehigh	Navy	Navy–Marine Corps Memorial Stadium • Annapolis, Maryland	24–9	25,047	
September 26	Louisiana Tech	Kansas	David Booth Kansas Memorial Stadium • Lawrence, Kansas	16–11	23,000	
October 10	Marshall	Louisville	Cardinal Stadium • Louisville, Kentucky	34–31	21,658	
October 17	Colgate	Army	Michie Stadium • West Point, New York	22–20	40,578	
October 17	No. 16 (I-AA) Delaware State	Akron	Rubber Bowl • Akron, Ohio	52–26	9,491	
November 7	East Tennessee State	NC State	Carter–Finley Stadium • Raleigh, North Carolina	29–14	35,400	
November 7	Cincinnati	Indiana State	Hoosier Dome • Indianapolis, Indiana	16–40	5,424	
November 7	No. 8 (I-AA) Northeast Louisiana	Southern Miss	M. M. Roberts Stadium • Hattiesburg, Mississippi	34–24	10,123	
November 7	No. 19 (I-AA) Northern Arizona	Tulsa	Skelly Stadium • Tulsa, Oklahoma	24–20	10,863	
November 20	No. 19 (I-AA) Youngstown State	Akron	Rubber Bowl • Akron, Ohio (Steel Tire)	10–6	1,300	
November 21	Indiana State	Ball State	Hoosier Dome • Indianapolis, Indiana (Blue Key Victory Bell)	24–23	7,323	
^{#}Rankings from AP Poll released prior to game.

Note: Arkansas State at Memphis State tied 21–21.

== Season summary ==
=== September ===
The preseason AP Poll ranked Big 8 rivals Oklahoma and Nebraska at No. 1 and No. 2, followed by No. 3 UCLA, No. 4 Ohio State, and No. 5 Auburn.

September 5: No. 1 Oklahoma beat North Texas State 69-14, No. 2 Nebraska defeated Utah State 56-12, and No. 3 UCLA won 47-14 over San Diego State. No. 4 Ohio State was idle. No. 5 Auburn overwhelmed Texas 31-3 and moved up in the next poll: No. 1 Oklahoma, No. 2 Nebraska, No. 3 UCLA, No. 4 Auburn, and No. 5 Ohio State.

September 12: No. 1 Oklahoma shut out North Carolina 28-0. No. 2 Nebraska hosted No. 3 UCLA and won 42-33. No. 4 Auburn blanked Kansas 49-0. No. 5 Ohio State opened their schedule with a 24-3 win over West Virginia, and No. 6 LSU (who had easily defeated No. 15 Texas A&M in their opener) beat Cal State Fullerton 56-12. The next poll featured No. 1 Oklahoma, No. 2 Nebraska, No. 3 Auburn, No. 4 LSU, and No. 5 Ohio State.

September 19: No. 1 Oklahoma, No. 2 Nebraska, and No. 3 Auburn were all idle. No. 4 LSU beat Rice 49-16. No. 5 Ohio State defeated Oregon 24-14 but fell out of the top five in the next poll. They were replaced by No. 6 Miami, who was idle this week but had started the year with an impressive 31-4 blowout of then-No. 20 Florida. The poll featured No. 1 Oklahoma, No. 2 Nebraska, No. 3 Auburn, No. 4 LSU, and No. 5 Miami.

September 26: No. 1 Oklahoma won in a second consecutive shutout, 65-0 over Tulsa. No. 2 Nebraska visited No. 12 Arizona State and defeated the Sun Devils 35-28. No. 3 Auburn played No. 11 Tennessee to a 20-20 tie. No. 4 LSU had the same result, as they threw three fourth-quarter interceptions which allowed No. 7 Ohio State to come away with a 13-13 draw. No. 5 Miami overwhelmed No. 10 Arkansas 51-7, No. 6 Florida State won 31-3 at Michigan State, and No. 8 Notre Dame was a 44-20 victor over Purdue. The next poll featured No. 1 Oklahoma, No. 2 Nebraska, No. 3 Miami, No. 4 Florida State, and No. 5 Notre Dame.

=== October ===
October 3: No. 1 Oklahoma won 56-3 at Iowa State, and No. 2 Nebraska beat South Carolina 30-21. No. 3 Miami and No. 4 Florida State squared off in a game which featured 63 future NFL players. The Seminoles led 19-3 late in the third quarter, but the Hurricanes responded with 23 unanswered points to take a seven-point lead. After Florida State scored a touchdown with 42 seconds left, coach Bobby Bowden sent out his kicker for a game-tying extra point, but changed his mind at the last moment and called for a two-point conversion. Quarterback Danny McManus’ pass was deflected, giving Miami a 26-25 victory. No. 5 Notre Dame was idle, and No. 6 Auburn bounced back with a 20-10 win at North Carolina. The next poll featured No. 1 Oklahoma, No. 2 Nebraska, No. 3 Miami, No. 4 Notre Dame, and No. 5 Auburn.

October 10: No. 1 Oklahoma held their opponent without a touchdown for the fourth game in a row, limiting Texas to three field goals in a 44-9 triumph. No. 2 Nebraska was similarly dominant, beating Kansas 54-2. No. 3 Miami defeated Maryland 46-16, but No. 4 Notre Dame lost 30-22 at Pittsburgh. No. 5 Auburn won 48-15 over Vanderbilt, and No. 6 Florida State visited Southern Mississippi for a 61-10 win. The next poll featured No. 1 Oklahoma, No. 2 Nebraska, No. 3 Miami, No. 4 Florida State, and No. 5 Auburn.

October 17: No. 1 Oklahoma won 59-10 at Kansas State, and No. 2 Nebraska shut out No. 12 Oklahoma State 35-0. No. 3 Miami was idle, and No. 4 Florida State defeated Louisville 32-9. No. 5 Auburn won 20-10 at Georgia Tech, but the AP voters were more impressed with No. 6 LSU’s 34-9 victory over Kentucky, and the teams switched spots in the next poll: No. 1 Oklahoma, No. 2 Nebraska, No. 3 Miami, No. 4 Florida State, and No. 5 LSU.

October 24: No. 1 Oklahoma defeated Colorado 24-6, No. 2 Nebraska dominated Kansas State 56-3, and No. 3 Miami won 48-10 at Cincinnati. No. 4 Florida State and No. 5 LSU were idle, and the top five remained the same.

October 31: All of the highly-ranked teams registered blowout wins this week. No. 1 Oklahoma crushed Kansas 71-10, No. 2 Nebraska won 42-7 at Missouri, No. 3 Miami beat East Carolina 41-3, No. 4 Florida State dominated Tulane 73-14, and No. 5 LSU defeated Mississippi 42-13. The top five again remained the same.

=== November–December ===
November 7: No. 1 Oklahoma hosted No. 12 Oklahoma State and won 29-10, but quarterback Jamelle Holieway was lost for the season with a torn ACL, and fullback Lydell Carr also suffered a knee injury. No. 2 Nebraska overwhelmed Iowa State 42-3. The name was the only similarity between No. 3 Miami-Florida and unranked Miami-Ohio, as the Hurricanes defeated the Redskins 54-3. No. 4 Florida State visited No. 6 Auburn and breezed to a 34-6 victory. Auburn’s SEC rival, No. 5 LSU, fell 22-10 to No. 13 Alabama. No. 7 UCLA, whose only loss was to Nebraska, won 52-17 at Oregon State. The top five in the next poll were No. 1 Oklahoma, No. 2 Nebraska, No. 3 Miami, No. 4 Florida State, and No. 5 UCLA.

November 14: Without Holieway and Carr, No. 1 Oklahoma struggled to a 17-13 victory over Missouri. No. 2 Nebraska, who had defeated Missouri by 35 points a few weeks earlier, was idle. No. 3 Miami beat Virginia Tech 27-13, No. 4 Florida State defeated Furman 41-10, and No. 5 UCLA won 47-14 over Washington. The top two teams switched spots in the next poll: No. 1 Nebraska, No. 2 Oklahoma, No. 3 Miami, No. 4 Florida State, and No. 5 UCLA.

November 21: In what was effectively a semifinal for the national championship, No. 1 Nebraska and No. 2 Oklahoma met to decide the Big 8 title and an Orange Bowl berth. Despite their injuries, the Sooners finished an undefeated regular season with a 17-7 victory, their fourth win in as many years over the Cornhuskers. No. 3 Miami defeated Toledo 24-14, while No. 4 Florida State was idle. No. 5 UCLA needed only a win over unranked USC to gain the Pac-10 title, but the Trojans pulled off a 17-13 upset to earn the Rose Bowl berth. Their opponent would be No. 11 Michigan State, who had already clinched the Big Ten championship. No. 6 Syracuse won a thriller against West Virginia, triumphing 32-31 on a two-point conversion with ten seconds left to finish the regular season undefeated. The top five in the next poll were No. 1 Oklahoma, No. 2 Miami, No. 3 Florida State, No. 4 Syracuse, and No. 5 Nebraska.

November 26–28: No. 1 Oklahoma and No. 4 Syracuse had finished their seasons. No. 2 Miami shut out No. 10 Notre Dame 24-0, No. 3 Florida State won 28-14 at Florida, and No. 5 Nebraska beat Colorado 24-7. The last few bowl tie-ins were decided this week: No. 7 Auburn’s 10-0 shutout of No. 18 Alabama in the Iron Bowl gave the Tigers the SEC title and a Sugar Bowl berth, while No. 15 Texas A&M won the SWC and a spot in the Cotton Bowl with a 20-13 defeat of Texas. The top five remained the same in the next poll.

December 5: No. 2 Miami ended their season undefeated with a 20-16 win over No. 8 South Carolina. The other top-ranked teams had already finished their schedules, and the top five remained the same in the final poll of the regular season.

With both teams possessing 11-0 records, the Orange Bowl between No. 1 Oklahoma and No. 2 Miami would decide the national championship. Over the past three years, the Sooners were 0-2 against the Hurricanes and 33-0 against all other opponents, and they would have the opportunity for revenge on the biggest stage. No. 4 Syracuse, also undefeated but without a clear path to the championship, would face No. 6 Auburn in the Sugar Bowl. No. 3 Florida State and No. 5 Nebraska (whose only losses were to Miami and Oklahoma respectively) would match up in the Fiesta Bowl. The Rose Bowl featured the usual Big Ten/Pac-10 matchup of No. 8 Michigan State and No. 16 USC, while the Cotton Bowl pitted No. 12 Notre Dame against No. 13 Texas A&M.

=== Notable rivalry games ===
- Michigan State 17, Michigan 11
- South Carolina 20, Clemson 7
- Auburn 10, Alabama 0
- Kansas 17, Kansas State 17
- LSU 41, Tulane 36
- Oklahoma 17, Nebraska 7
- Miami 26, Florida State 25
- USC 17 UCLA 13 (decided Rose Bowl berth)
- Pitt 10, Penn State 0
- Texas 16, Arkansas 14
- Arizona State 24, Arizona 24

=== Bowl games ===
National Championship:

- Orange Bowl: No. 2 Miami (FL) 20, No. 1 Oklahoma 14

New Year's Day Bowls:

- Fiesta Bowl: No. 3 Florida State 31, No. 5 Nebraska 28
- Sugar Bowl: No. 6 Auburn 16, No. 4 Syracuse 16
- Rose Bowl: No. 8 Michigan State 20, No. 16 USC 17
- Cotton Bowl: No. 13 Texas A&M 35, No. 12 Notre Dame 10
- Florida Citrus Bowl: No. 14 Clemson 35, No. 20 Penn State 10

Other Bowls:

- Hall of Fame Bowl: Michigan 28, Alabama 24
- Gator Bowl: No. 7 LSU 30, No. 9 South Carolina 13
- John Hancock Sun Bowl: No. 11 Oklahoma State 35, West Virginia 33
- Holiday Bowl: No. 18 Iowa 20, Wyoming 19
- Freedom Bowl: Arizona State 33, Air Force 28
- Peach Bowl: No. 17 Tennessee 27, Indiana 22
- All-American Bowl: Virginia 22, BYU 16
- Liberty Bowl: No. 15 Georgia 20, Arkansas 17
- Aloha Bowl: No. 10 UCLA 20, Florida 16
- Independence Bowl: Washington 24, Tulane 12
- California Bowl: Eastern Michigan 30, San Jose State 27
- Bluebonnet Bowl: Texas 32, No. 19 Pittsburgh 27

== Polls ==
=== Final AP Poll ===
1. Miami (FL)
2. Florida State
3. Oklahoma
4. Syracuse
5. LSU
6. Nebraska
7. Auburn
8. Michigan State
9. UCLA
10. Texas A&M
11. Oklahoma State
12. Clemson
13. Georgia
14. Tennessee
15. South Carolina
16. Iowa
17. Notre Dame
18. Southern California
19. Michigan
20. Arizona State

=== Final Coaches Poll ===
1. Miami (FL)
2. Florida State
3. Oklahoma
4. Syracuse
5. LSU
6. Nebraska
7. Auburn
8. Michigan State
9. Texas A&M
10. Clemson
11. UCLA
12. Oklahoma State
13. Tennessee
14. Georgia
15. South Carolina
16. Iowa
17. Southern California
18. Michigan
19. Texas
20. Indiana

== Awards ==
=== Heisman Trophy voting ===
The Heisman Trophy is given to the year's most outstanding player

Player	School	Position	1st	2nd	3rd	Total
Tim Brown	Notre Dame	WR	324	173	124	1,442
Don McPherson	Syracuse	QB	167	135	60	831
Gordie Lockbaum	Holy Cross	RB	108	103	127	657
Lorenzo White	Michigan State	RB	89	121	123	632
Craig Heyward	Pittsburgh	RB	17	44	31	170
Chris Spielman	Ohio State	LB	15	20	15	110
Thurman Thomas	Oklahoma State	RB	11	23	20	99
Gaston Green	UCLA	RB	4	13	35	73
Emmitt Smith	Florida	RB	2	11	42	70
Bobby Humphrey	Alabama	RB	5	17	14	63

=== Other major awards ===
- Maxwell (Player):Don McPherson, Syracuse
- Camp (Back): Tim Brown, Notre Dame
- O'Brien Award (QB): Don McPherson, Syracuse
- Rockne (Lineman): N/A
- Lombardi (Linebacker): Chris Spielman, Ohio State
- Outland (Interior): Chad Hennings, Air Force
- Coach of the Year:

== Attendances ==
Average home attendance top 3:

Rank	Team	Average
1	Michigan Wolverines	104,469
2	Tennessee Volunteers	88,179
3	Ohio State Buckeyes	85,295
