= 1987 Liberty Bowl =

- 29th Liberty Bowl
Arkansas Razorbacks	Georgia Bulldogs
(9–3)	(8–3)
SWC	SEC
17	20
Head coach: Ken Hatfield	Head coach: Vince Dooley
	AP / Coaches; 15 / 15
	1	2	3	4	Total
Arkansas	3	7	7	0	17
Georgia	0	7	0	13	20
- Date: December 29, 1987
- Season: 1987
- Stadium: Liberty Bowl Memorial Stadium
- Location: Memphis, Tennessee
- MVP: QB Greg Thomas (Arkansas)
- Referee: Tom Quinn (Big Ten)
- Attendance: 53,240

United States TV coverage
- Network: Raycom
- Announcers: Phil Stone; Dave Rowe

The 1987 Liberty Bowl was a college football postseason bowl game played on December 29, 1987, in Memphis, Tennessee. The 29th edition of the Liberty Bowl, the game featured the Arkansas Razorbacks and the Georgia Bulldogs.

== Background ==
This was the third meeting between Arkansas and Georgia (the first two being in the 1969 Sugar Bowl and the 1976 Cotton Bowl Classic). The Razorbacks finished second in the Southwest Conference (SWC) for the third straight year. The Bulldogs finished fourth in the Southeastern Conference (SEC). This was Georgia's first Liberty Bowl since 1967, and Arkansas' first since 1984.

== Game summary ==
A field goal by Arkansas' Trainor gave them a 3–0 lead. Lars Tate gave the Bulldogs the lead on his one-yard touchdown run to make it 7–3 36 seconds into the second quarter, but the Razorbacks responded with a Greg Thomas touchdown run with 31 seconds remaining in the half to make it 10–7. Another Thomas touchdown run made it 17–7 in the third quarter. John Kasay narrowed the lead to 17–10 three seconds into the fourth quarter on his 24-yard field goal. James Jackson scored on a five-yard touchdown run to tie it with 10:23 in the game. With 1:42 left, Arkansas tried to gain the victory with a 35-yard field goal, but the kick missed. Georgia could not do anything with their possession, giving the ball back to the Hogs. But with 46 seconds to go, Carver Russaw intercepted a Thomas pass, returning it to the Georgia 43. Three plays later (culminated by James Jackson's 16-yard pass to Troy Sadowski), the Bulldogs were in field goal position to win. Kasay's kick from 39 yards out split through the uprights with no time remaining, giving the Bulldogs their first bowl victory since 1984. Greg Thomas went 7-of-17 for 86 yards with 79 yards rushing on 13 carries for Arkansas. James Jackson went 15-of-25 for 148 yards with 72 rushing yards on 10 carries for Georgia.

== Aftermath ==
The two teams met once more, in the 1991 Independence Bowl, before the Razorbacks joined the SEC in 1992.

== Statistics ==
Statistics	Arkansas	Georgia
First downs	19	20
Rushing yards	258	202
Passing yards	86	148
Return yardage	95	68
Fumbles–lost	2–1	0–0
Punts–average	3–32.7	3–31.0
Penalties–penalty yards	4–45	5–50
