= 1988 Florida Citrus Bowl =

American college football game

1988 Florida Citrus Growers Association Florida Citrus Bowl
Clemson Tigers	Penn State Nittany Lions
(9–2)	(8–3)
ACC	Independent
35	10
Head coach: Danny Ford	Head coach: Joe Paterno
AP / Coaches; 14 / 12	AP / Coaches; 20 / 19
	1	2	3	4	Total
Clemson	7	7	7	14	35
Penn State	7	0	3	0	10
- Date: January 1, 1988
- Season: 1987
- Stadium: Florida Citrus Bowl
- Location: Orlando, Florida
- MVP: Rodney Williams, QB, Clemson
- Referee: Paul Schmitt (SICOA)
- Attendance: 53,152

United States TV coverage
- Network: ABC
- Announcers: Gary Bender and Lynn Swann

The 1988 Florida Citrus Bowl was held on January 1, 1988 at the Florida Citrus Bowl in Orlando, Florida. The #14 Clemson Tigers defeated the #20 Penn State Nittany Lions by a score of 35–10.

The first quarter saw both teams score: first the Tigers on a 7-yard rush and then Penn State on a 39-yard pass. The second quarter saw only a Clemson touchdown on a 6-yard rush, and the halftime score was 14–7. Penn State converted a 27-yard field goal to cut the deficit to 4, but then Clemson proceeded to score 21 unanswered points. The Tigers scored on a 1-yard touchdown rush to end the third quarter 21–10, and then scored on two more rushes, from 25 and 4 yards out. Clemson won the game by a score of 35–10.
