= 1987 LSU Tigers football team =

American college football season

1987 LSU Tigers football

Gator Bowl champion

Gator Bowl, W 30–13 vs. South Carolina
- Conference: Southeastern Conference

Ranking
- Coaches: No. 5
- AP: No. 5
- Record: 10–1–1 (5–1 SEC)
- Head coach: Mike Archer (1st season)
- Offensive coordinator: Ed Zaunbrecher (4th season)
- Offensive scheme: Multiple
- Defensive coordinator: Pete Jenkins (2nd season)
- Base defense: 3–4
- Home stadium: Tiger Stadium

1987 Southeastern Conference football standings
	Conf.					Overall
Team	W		L		T	W		L		T
No. 7 Auburn $	5	–	0	–	1	9	–	1	–	2
No. 5 LSU	5	–	1	–	0	10	–	1	–	1
No. 14 Tennessee	4	–	1	–	1	10	–	2	–	1
No. 13 Georgia	4	–	2	–	0	9	–	3	–	0
Alabama	4	–	2	–	0	7	–	5	–	0
Florida	3	–	3	–	0	6	–	6	–	0
Kentucky	1	–	5	–	0	5	–	6	–	0
Mississippi State	1	–	5	–	0	4	–	7	–	0
Vanderbilt	1	–	5	–	0	4	–	7	–	0
Ole Miss	1	–	5	–	0	3	–	8	–	0
$ – Conference champion; Rankings from AP Poll

The 1987 LSU Tigers football team represented Louisiana State University during the 1987 NCAA Division I-A football season. The team was led by Mike Archer in his first season and finished with an overall record of ten wins, one loss, and one tie (10–1–1 overall, 5–1 in the SEC) and with a victory over South Carolina in the Gator Bowl.

== Schedule ==
Date	Time	Opponent	Rank	Site	TV	Result	Attendance	Source
September 5	7:00 p.m.	at No. 15 Texas A&M*	No. 6	Kyle Field; College Station, TX (rivalry)	ESPN	W 17–3	71,292	
September 12	7:30 p.m.	Cal State Fullerton*	No. 6	Tiger Stadium; Baton Rouge, LA	PPV	W 56–12	73,452	
September 19	7:00 p.m.	Rice*	No. 4	Tiger Stadium; Baton Rouge, LA	PPV	W 49–16	73,558	
September 26	1:30 p.m.	No. 7 Ohio State*	No. 4	Tiger Stadium; Baton Rouge, LA	CBS	T 13–13	79,263	
October 3	6:30 p.m.	No. 19 Florida	No. 7	Tiger Stadium; Baton Rouge, LA (rivalry)	ESPN	W 13–10	79,313	
October 10	3:00 p.m.	at No. 16 Georgia	No. 7	Sanford Stadium; Athens, GA	ESPN	W 26–23	82,122	
October 17	11:30 a.m.	Kentucky	No. 6	Tiger Stadium; Baton Rouge, LA	TBS	W 34–9	77,084	
October 31	6:00 p.m.	at Ole Miss	No. 5	Mississippi Veterans Memorial Stadium; Jackson, MS (rivalry)	PPV	W 42–13	56,500	
November 7	6:30 p.m.	No. 13 Alabama	No. 5	Tiger Stadium; Baton Rouge, LA (rivalry)	ESPN	L 10–22	79,379	
November 14	7:00 p.m.	Mississippi State^{†}	No. 10	Tiger Stadium; Baton Rouge, LA (rivalry)	PPV	W 34–14	79,258	
November 21	7:30 p.m.	at Tulane*	No. 9	Louisiana Superdome; New Orleans, LA (Battle for the Rag)	PPV	W 41–36	70,168	
December 31	1:30 p.m.	vs. No. 8 South Carolina*	No. 7	Gator Bowl Stadium; Jacksonville, FL (Gator Bowl)	CBS	W 30–13	82,119	
*Non-conference game; ^{†}Homecoming; Rankings from AP Poll released prior to the game; All times are in Central time

== Personnel ==
1987 LSU Tigers football team roster
Players
Coaches
Offense

Pos.	#	Name	Class
C	56	Nacho Albergamo	Sr
G	76	Eric Andolsek (C)	Sr
WR	82	Wendell Davis (C)	Sr
QB		Sol Graves	Fr
QB	10	Mickey Guidry
QB	13	Tommy Hodson	So
TE	49	Brian Kinchen	Sr
WR	80	Rogie Magee	Sr
WR	23	Sammy Martin
WR	6	Tony Moss	So
RB	22	Harvey Williams	So

Defense

Pos.	#	Name	Class
S		Jamie Bice	Jr
S		Chris Carrier	Sr
DE		Tommy Clapp (C)
LB	48	Nicky Hazard (C)	Sr
NG	62	Darrell Phillips	Jr
LB		Ron Sancho	Jr

Special teams

Pos.	#	Name	Class
K	4	David Browndyke	So
P	3	Matt DeFrank	Sr

Head coach

- Mike Archer

Coordinators/assistant coaches

- Ed Zaunbrecher – Offensive coordinator/quarterbacks
- Jesse Daigle – Running backs
- Jerry Sullivan – Wide receivers
- Marty Galbraith – Tight ends
- Pete Mangurian – Offensive line
- Pete Jenkins – Defensive coordinator/defensive line
- Joe Wessel – Inside linebackers
- John Mitchell – Outside linebackers
- John Fontes – Defensive backs

Legend

- (C) Team captain
- (S) Suspended
- (I) Ineligible
- Injured
- Redshirt

== Rankings ==
Ranking movements Legend: ██ Increase in ranking ██ Decrease in ranking т = Tied with team above or below ( ) = First-place votes
	Week															
Poll	Pre	1	2	3	4	5	6	7	8	9	10	11	12	13	14	Final
AP	6	6	4	4	7	7	6	5	5	5	10	9	6	7	7	5
Coaches	11 т	6 (1)	5	4	8	6	5	4	4	5	11	10	7	7	7	5

== 1988 NFL Draft ==
Player	Position	Round	Pick	NFL club
Wendell Davis	Wide receiver	1	27	Chicago Bears
Kevin Guidry	Defensive back	3	79	Denver Broncos
Sammy Martin	Wide receiver	4	97	New England Patriots
Eric Andolsek	Guard	5	111	Detroit Lions
Rogee Magee	Wide receiver	9	245	Chicago Bears
Chris Carrier	Defensive back	12	318	Phoenix Cardinals
Brian Kinchen	Tight end	12	320	Miami Dolphins
