= 1987 Georgia Bulldogs football team =

American college football season

1987 Georgia Bulldogs football

Liberty Bowl champion

Liberty Bowl, W 20–17 vs. Arkansas
- Conference: Southeastern Conference

Ranking
- Coaches: No. 14
- AP: No. 13
- Record: 9–3 (4–2 SEC)
- Head coach: Vince Dooley (24th season)
- Offensive coordinator: George Haffner (8th season)
- Home stadium: Sanford Stadium

1987 Southeastern Conference football standings
	Conf.					Overall
Team	W		L		T	W		L		T
No. 7 Auburn $	5	–	0	–	1	9	–	1	–	2
No. 5 LSU	5	–	1	–	0	10	–	1	–	1
No. 14 Tennessee	4	–	1	–	1	10	–	2	–	1
No. 13 Georgia	4	–	2	–	0	9	–	3	–	0
Alabama	4	–	2	–	0	7	–	5	–	0
Florida	3	–	3	–	0	6	–	6	–	0
Kentucky	1	–	5	–	0	5	–	6	–	0
Mississippi State	1	–	5	–	0	4	–	7	–	0
Vanderbilt	1	–	5	–	0	4	–	7	–	0
Ole Miss	1	–	5	–	0	3	–	8	–	0
$ – Conference champion; Rankings from AP Poll

The 1987 Georgia Bulldogs football team represented the University of Georgia as a member of the Southeastern Conference (SEC) during the 1987 NCAA Division I-A football season. Led by 24th-year head coach Vince Dooley, the Bulldogs compiled an overall record of 9–3, with a mark of 4–2 in conference play, and finished tied for fourth in the SEC.

== Schedule ==
Date	Opponent	Rank	Site	TV	Result	Attendance	Source
September 5	Virginia*	No. 20	Sanford Stadium; Athens, GA		W 30–22	75,126	
September 12	Oregon State*	No. 20	Sanford Stadium; Athens, GA		W 41–7	73,211	
September 19	at No. 8 Clemson*	No. 18	Memorial Stadium; Clemson, SC (rivalry)	CBS	L 20–21	81,875	
September 26	South Carolina*	No. 20	Sanford Stadium; Athens, GA (rivalry)		W 13–6	82,122	
October 3	at Ole Miss	No. 20	Vaught–Hemingway Stadium; Oxford, MS		W 31–14	32,000	
October 10	No. 7 LSU	No. 16	Sanford Stadium; Athens, GA	ESPN	L 23–26	82,122	
October 17	at Vanderbilt	No. 18	Vanderbilt Stadium; Nashville, TN (rivalry)		W 52–24	40,878	
October 24	Kentucky^{†}	No. 12	Sanford Stadium; Athens, GA	TBS	W 17–14	81,911	
November 7	vs. No. 17 Florida	No. 10	Gator Bowl Stadium; Jacksonville, FL (rivalry)	TBS	W 23–10	81,975	
November 14	No. 12 Auburn	No. 8	Sanford Stadium; Athens, GA (rivalry)	ESPN	L 11–27	82,122	
November 28	at Georgia Tech*	No. 14	Grant Field; Atlanta, GA (rivalry)	ESPN	W 30–16	45,103	
December 29	vs. Arkansas*	No. 15	Liberty Bowl Memorial Stadium; Memphis, TN (Liberty Bowl)	Raycom	W 20–17	53,249	
*Non-conference game; ^{†}Homecoming; Rankings from AP Poll released prior to the game

== Personnel ==
1987 Georgia Bulldogs football team roster
Players
Coaches
Offense

Pos.	#	Name	Class
OT	75	Scott Adams	Jr
OT	61	Shelly Anderson	Jr
RB		Hiawatha Berry
RB		Kevin Brown
OL		Mack Burroughs
RB		Brian Cleveland
RB		Alphonso Ellis
RB	7	Rodney Hampton	Fr
QB		James Jackson	Sr
RB		Randy Jackson
QB	18	Wayne Johnson	Jr
WR		Nate Lewis
OL		Curt Mull
WR		Cassius Osborn
TE	87	Troy Sadowski	Jr
OL		Kim Stephens
RB	32	Lars Tate	Sr
WR		John Thomas
TE		Kirk Warner
OL		Todd Wheeler
RB		Greg Williams

Defense

Pos.	#	Name	Class
DB		Rusty Beasley
LB	42	John Brantley	Sr
DL		Larry Brown
DL		Aaron Chubb
DL	97	Paul Giles
DT		Bill Goldberg	So
LB	54	Vince Guthrie
DB		Will Jones
DL		Tyrone McClendon
CB	26	Ben Smith	So
DE	92	Richard Tardits	Sr
CB	15	Mark Vincent	Sr
LB		Terrie Webster

Special teams

Pos.	#	Name	Class
K		Steve Crumley
P		David Dukes
P		Joey Hester
K	3	John Kasay	Fr

Head coach

- Vince Dooley

Coordinators/assistant coaches

- Joe Hollis
  (Offensive line)

Legend

- (C) Team captain
- (S) Suspended
- (I) Ineligible
- Injured
- Redshirt
