= Stacey Simmons (American football) =

American football player (born 1968)

No. 85
- Position: Wide receiver

Personal information
- Born: August 5, 1968 (age 58); Clearwater, Florida, U.S.
- Listed height: 5 ft 10 in (1.78 m)
- Listed weight: 183 lb (83 kg)

Career information
- High school: Dunedin (FL)
- College: Florida
- NFL draft: 1990: 4th round, 83rd overall pick

Career history
- Indianapolis Colts (1990); New England Patriots (1991)*; Orlando Thunder (1992); Tampa Bay Buccaneers (1992)*; Los Angeles Raiders (1992)*; Orlando Predators (1993); Tampa Bay Storm (1995–1996)
- * Offseason or practice squad member only

Awards and highlights
- 2× ArenaBowl champion (1995, 1996)

Career NFL statistics
- Receptions: 4
- Receiving yards: 33
- Return yards: 348
- Stats at Pro Football Reference

Stacey Simmons (born August 5, 1968) is an American former professional football player who was a wide receiver for the Indianapolis Colts of the National Football League (NFL) in 1990. He played college football for the Florida Gators and was selected by the Colts in the fourth round of the 1990 NFL draft.

Simmons was also an All-American sprinter for the Florida Gators track and field team.
