= 1987 Auburn Tigers football team =

American college football season

1987 Auburn Tigers football

SEC champion

Sugar Bowl, T 16–16 vs. Syracuse
- Conference: Southeastern Conference

Ranking
- Coaches: No. 7
- AP: No. 7
- Record: 9–1–2 (5–0–1 SEC)
- Head coach: Pat Dye (7th season)
- Defensive coordinator: Wayne Hall (2nd season)
- Home stadium: Jordan–Hare Stadium

1987 Southeastern Conference football standings
	Conf.					Overall
Team	W		L		T	W		L		T
No. 7 Auburn $	5	–	0	–	1	9	–	1	–	2
No. 5 LSU	5	–	1	–	0	10	–	1	–	1
No. 14 Tennessee	4	–	1	–	1	10	–	2	–	1
No. 13 Georgia	4	–	2	–	0	9	–	3	–	0
Alabama	4	–	2	–	0	7	–	5	–	0
Florida	3	–	3	–	0	6	–	6	–	0
Kentucky	1	–	5	–	0	5	–	6	–	0
Mississippi State	1	–	5	–	0	4	–	7	–	0
Vanderbilt	1	–	5	–	0	4	–	7	–	0
Ole Miss	1	–	5	–	0	3	–	8	–	0
$ – Conference champion; Rankings from AP Poll

The 1987 Auburn Tigers football team represented Auburn University in the 1987 NCAA Division I-A football season. Coached by Pat Dye, the team finished the season with a 9–1–2 record and won their first of three straight Southeastern Conference (SEC) titles. Auburn went on to tie an undefeated Syracuse team in the 1988 Sugar Bowl, 16–16. It is the only tie in Sugar Bowl history.

== Schedule ==
Date	Opponent	Rank	Site	TV	Result	Attendance	Source
September 5	Texas*	No. 5	Jordan-Hare Stadium; Auburn, AL	ESPN	W 31–3	80,000	
September 12	Kansas*	No. 4	Jordan-Hare Stadium; Auburn, AL		W 49–0	65,711	
September 26	at No. 11 Tennessee	No. 3	Neyland Stadium; Knoxville, TN (rivalry)	TBS	T 20–20	93,506	
October 3	at North Carolina*	No. 6	Kenan Memorial Stadium; Chapel Hill, NC		W 20–10	52,811	
October 10	Vanderbilt	No. 5	Jordan-Hare Stadium; Auburn, AL		W 48–15	79,500	
October 17	at Georgia Tech*	No. 5	Grant Field; Atlanta, GA (rivalry)		W 20–10	45,559	
October 24	Mississippi State^{†}	No. 6	Jordan-Hare Stadium; Auburn, AL		W 38–7	79,900	
October 31	No. 10 Florida	No. 6	Jordan-Hare Stadium; Auburn, AL (rivalry)	ESPN	W 29–6	85,187	
November 7	No. 4 Florida State*	No. 6	Jordan-Hare Stadium; Auburn, AL	CBS	L 6–34	85,170	
November 14	at No. 8 Georgia	No. 12	Sanford Stadium; Athens, GA (rivalry)	ESPN	W 27–11	82,122	
November 27	vs. No. 18 Alabama	No. 7	Legion Field; Birmingham, AL (Iron Bowl)	CBS	W 10–0	75,808	
January 1	vs. No. 4 Syracuse*	No. 6	Louisiana Superdome; New Orleans, LA (Sugar Bowl)	ABC	T 16–16	75,495	
*Non-conference game; ^{†}Homecoming; Rankings from AP Poll released prior to the game
