= 1987 Tennessee Volunteers football team =

American college football season

1987 Tennessee Volunteers football

Peach Bowl champion

Peach Bowl, W 27–22 vs. Indiana
- Conference: Southeastern Conference

Ranking
- Coaches: No. 13
- AP: No. 14
- Record: 10–2–1 (4–1–1 SEC)
- Head coach: Johnny Majors (11th season)
- Offensive coordinator: Walt Harris (5th season)
- Defensive coordinator: Ken Donahue (3rd season)
- Captains: Harry Galbreath; Kelly Ziegler
- Home stadium: Neyland Stadium

1987 Southeastern Conference football standings
	Conf.					Overall
Team	W		L		T	W		L		T
No. 7 Auburn $	5	–	0	–	1	9	–	1	–	2
No. 5 LSU	5	–	1	–	0	10	–	1	–	1
No. 14 Tennessee	4	–	1	–	1	10	–	2	–	1
No. 13 Georgia	4	–	2	–	0	9	–	3	–	0
Alabama	4	–	2	–	0	7	–	5	–	0
Florida	3	–	3	–	0	6	–	6	–	0
Kentucky	1	–	5	–	0	5	–	6	–	0
Mississippi State	1	–	5	–	0	4	–	7	–	0
Vanderbilt	1	–	5	–	0	4	–	7	–	0
Ole Miss	1	–	5	–	0	3	–	8	–	0
$ – Conference champion; Rankings from AP Poll

The 1987 Tennessee Volunteers football team (variously "Tennessee", "UT" or the "Vols") represented the University of Tennessee in the 1987 NCAA Division I-A football season. Playing as a member of the Southeastern Conference (SEC), the team was led by head coach Johnny Majors, in his 11th year, and played their home games at Neyland Stadium in Knoxville, Tennessee. They finished the season with a record of ten wins, two losses and one tie (10–2–1 overall, 4–1–1 in the SEC) and with a victory over Indiana in the Peach Bowl. The Volunteers offense scored 293 points while the defense allowed 249 points.

== Schedule ==
Date	Opponent	Rank	Site	TV	Result	Attendance	Source
August 30	vs. No. 16 Iowa*	No. 17	Giants Stadium; East Rutherford, NJ (Kickoff Classic)	ABC	W 23–22	54,861	
September 5	Colorado State*	No. 17	Neyland Stadium; Knoxville, TN		W 49–3	92,921	
September 12	at Mississippi State	No. 14	Scott Field; Starkville, MS	TBS	W 38–10	30,312	
September 26	No. 3 Auburn	No. 11	Neyland Stadium; Knoxville, TN (rivalry)	TBS	T 20–20	93,506	
October 3	California*	No. 10	Neyland Stadium; Knoxville, TN	TBS	W 38–12	91,688	
October 17	at Alabama	No. 8	Legion Field; Birmingham, AL (Third Saturday in October)	ESPN	L 22–41	75,808	
October 24	Georgia Tech*	No. 13	Neyland Stadium; Knoxville, TN (rivalry)		W 29–15	93,011	
October 31	at Boston College*	No. 13	Alumni Stadium; Chestnut Hill, MA	JPT	L 18–20	31,800	
November 7	Louisville*	No. 19	Neyland Stadium; Knoxville, TN		W 41–10	92,084	
November 14	Ole Miss^{†}	No. 18	Neyland Stadium; Knoxville, TN (rivalry)		W 55–13	94,237	
November 21	at Kentucky	No. 15	Commonwealth Stadium; Lexington, KY (rivalry)		W 24–22	57,127	
November 28	Vanderbilt	No. 16	Neyland Stadium; Knoxville, TN (rivalry)	WZTV	W 38–36	93,306	
January 2, 1988	vs. Indiana*	No. 17	Atlanta–Fulton County Stadium; Atlanta, GA (Peach Bowl)	Mizlou	W 27–22	58,737	
*Non-conference game; ^{†}Homecoming; Rankings from AP Poll released prior to the game

== Team players drafted into the NFL ==
Player	Position	Round	Pick	NFL club
Terry McDaniel	Defensive Back	1	9	Los Angeles Raiders
Anthony Miller	Wide Receiver	1	15	San Diego Chargers
John Bruhin	Guard	4	86	Tampa Bay Buccaneers
William Howard	Running Back	5	113	Tampa Bay Buccaneers
Harry Galbreath	Guard	8	212	Miami Dolphins
