= 1987 Alabama Crimson Tide football team =

American college football season

1987 Alabama Crimson Tide football

Hall of Fame Bowl, L 24–28 vs. Michigan
- Conference: Southeastern Conference
- Record: 7–5 (4–2 SEC)
- Head coach: Bill Curry (1st season)
- Offensive coordinator: Rip Scherer (1st season)
- Defensive coordinator: Don Lindsey (1st season)
- Captains: Randy Rockwell; Kerry Goode
- Home stadium: Legion Field

1987 Southeastern Conference football standings
	Conf.					Overall
Team	W		L		T	W		L		T
No. 7 Auburn $	5	–	0	–	1	9	–	1	–	2
No. 5 LSU	5	–	1	–	0	10	–	1	–	1
No. 14 Tennessee	4	–	1	–	1	10	–	2	–	1
No. 13 Georgia	4	–	2	–	0	9	–	3	–	0
Alabama	4	–	2	–	0	7	–	5	–	0
Florida	3	–	3	–	0	6	–	6	–	0
Kentucky	1	–	5	–	0	5	–	6	–	0
Mississippi State	1	–	5	–	0	4	–	7	–	0
Vanderbilt	1	–	5	–	0	4	–	7	–	0
Ole Miss	1	–	5	–	0	3	–	8	–	0
$ – Conference champion; Rankings from AP Poll

The 1987 Alabama Crimson Tide football team (variously "Alabama", "UA", "Bama" or "The Tide") represented the University of Alabama in the 1987 NCAA Division I-A football season. It was the Crimson Tide's 95th overall and 54th season as a member of the Southeastern Conference (SEC). The team was led by head coach Bill Curry, in his first year, and played their home games at Legion Field in Birmingham, Alabama. They finished the season with a record of seven wins and five losses (7–5 overall, 4–3 in the SEC) and with a loss in the Hall of Fame Bowl to Michigan.

Due to a major renovation project that resulted in the completion of the western upper deck, Alabama played all of their home games at Legion Field instead of splitting them with Bryant–Denny Stadium for the 1987 season.

== Schedule ==
Date	Time	Opponent	Rank	Site	TV	Result	Attendance	Source
September 5	1:30 p.m.	Southern Miss*		Legion Field; Birmingham, AL		W 38–6	75,808	
September 12	7:00 p.m.	at No. 11 Penn State*	No. 19	Beaver Stadium; University Park, PA (rivalry)	CBS	W 24–13	85,619	
September 19	11:30 a.m.	Florida	No. 11	Legion Field; Birmingham, AL (rivalry)	TBS	L 14–23	75,808	
September 26	7:00 p.m.	at Vanderbilt	No. 17	Vanderbilt Stadium; Nashville, TN		W 30–23	41,824	
October 3	3:00 p.m.	Southwestern Louisiana*^{†}	No. 17	Legion Field; Birmingham, AL		W 38–10	72,233	
October 10	3:00 p.m.	at Memphis State*	No. 15	Liberty Bowl Memorial Stadium; Memphis, TN		L 10–13	40,622	
October 17	6:00 p.m.	No. 8 Tennessee		Legion Field; Birmingham, AL (Third Saturday in October)	ESPN	W 41–22	75,808	
October 31	7:30 p.m.	Mississippi State	No. 16	Legion Field; Birmingham, AL (rivalry)		W 21–18	73,877	
November 7	6:30 p.m.	at No. 5 LSU	No. 13	Tiger Stadium; Baton Rouge, LA (rivalry)	ESPN	W 22–10	79,379	
November 14	1:30 p.m.	at No. 7 Notre Dame*	No. 11	Notre Dame Stadium; Notre Dame, IN	CBS	L 6–37	59,075	
November 27	1:30 p.m.	vs. No. 7 Auburn	No. 18	Legion Field; Birmingham, AL (Iron Bowl)	CBS	L 0–10	75,808	
January 2, 1988	12:00 p.m.	vs. Michigan*		Tampa Stadium; Tampa, FL (Hall of Fame Bowl)	NBC	L 24–28	60,156	
*Non-conference game; ^{†}Homecoming; Rankings from AP Poll released prior to the game; All times are in Central time

== Game summaries ==
=== At LSU ===
Team	1	2	3	4	Total
• Alabama	6	0	7	9	22
LSU	0	10	0	0	10

- Date: November 7
- Location: Tiger Stadium
- Game attendance: 79,379
- Television network: ESPN

Scoring summary
Q1	8:28	ALA	Doyle 45 yard field goal	ALA 3–0
Q1	4:27	ALA	Doyle 29 yard field goal	ALA 6–0
Q2	14:44	LSU	Browndyke 37 yard field goal	ALA 6–3
Q2	6:14	LSU	V. Jones 9 yard run (Browndyke kick)	LSU 10–6
Q3	5:04	ALA	Wright 1 yard run (Doyle kick)	ALA 13–10
Q4	7:08	ALA	Doyle 32 yard field goal	ALA 16–10
Q4	4:48	ALA	Humphrey 10 yard run (kick failed)	ALA 22–10

== Roster ==
1987 Alabama Crimson Tide football team roster
Players
Coaches
Offense

Pos.	#	Name	Class
TE	85	Howard Cross	Jr
RB	26	Bobby Humphrey	Jr

Defense

Pos.	#	Name	Class
CB	29	John Mangum	So
LB	55	Derrick Thomas	Jr

Special teams

Pos.	#	Name	Class
P	3	Chris Mohr	Jr

Head coach

- Bill Curry

Coordinators/assistant coaches

- John Thompson (LB)

Legend

- (C) Team captain
- (S) Suspended
- (I) Ineligible
- Injured
- Redshirt
