= 1987 NCAA Division I-A football rankings =

- Season: 1987
- Bowl season: 1987–88 bowl games
- Preseason No. 1: Oklahoma
- End of season champions: Miami (FL)

Two human polls comprised the 1987 National Collegiate Athletic Association (NCAA) Division I-A football rankings. Unlike most sports, college football's governing body, the NCAA, does not bestow a national championship, instead that title is bestowed by one or more different polling agencies. There are two main weekly polls that begin in the preseason—the AP Poll and the Coaches Poll.

== Legend ==
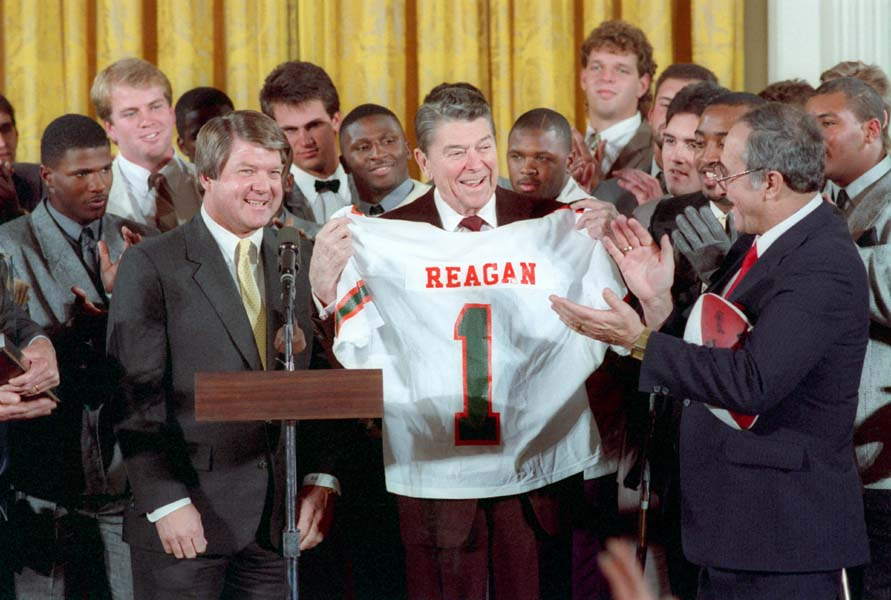
President Ronald Reagan holds up a University of Miami jersey presented to him by Miami Hurricanes head coach Jimmy Johnson and the 1987 Miami Hurricanes football team after winning the 1987 NCAA Division I-A national championship

.

	Increase in ranking
	Decrease in ranking
	Not ranked previous week
	National champion
(#–#)	Win–loss record
(Italics)	Number of first place votes
т	Tied with team above or below also with this symbol

== AP Poll ==
	Preseason Aug 28	Week 1 Sep 8	Week 2 Sep 15	Week 3 Sep 22	Week 4 Sep 29	Week 5 Oct 6	Week 6 Oct 13	Week 7 Oct 20	Week 8 Oct 27	Week 9 Nov 3	Week 10 Nov 10	Week 11 Nov 17	Week 12 Nov 24	Week 13 Dec 1	Week 14 Dec 8	Week 15 (Final) Jan 3	
1.	Oklahoma (55)	Oklahoma (1–0) (54)	Oklahoma (2–0) (54)	Oklahoma (2–0) (53)	Oklahoma (3–0) (44)	Oklahoma (4–0) (46)	Oklahoma (5–0) (47)	Oklahoma (6–0) (42)	Oklahoma (7–0) (40)	Oklahoma (8–0) (38)	Oklahoma (9–0) (36)	Nebraska (9–0) (32)	Oklahoma (11–0) (54)	Oklahoma (11–0) (48)	Oklahoma (11–0) (47)	Miami (FL) (12–0) (57)	1.
2.	Nebraska (3)	Nebraska (1–0) (3)	Nebraska (2–0) (6)	Nebraska (2–0) (7)	Nebraska (3–0) (12)	Nebraska (4–0) (8)	Nebraska (5–0) (7)	Nebraska (6–0) (12)	Nebraska (7–0) (13)	Nebraska (8–0) (15)	Nebraska (9–0) (15)	Oklahoma (10–0) (20)	Miami (FL) (9–0) (4)	Miami (FL) (10–0) (6)	Miami (FL) (11–0) (9)	Florida State (11–1)	2.
3.	UCLA (1)	UCLA (1–0) (1)	Auburn (2–0)	Auburn (2–0)	Miami (FL) (2–0) (4)	Miami (FL) (3–0) (6)	Miami (FL) (4–0) (6)	Miami (FL) (4–0) (6)	Miami (FL) (5–0) (7)	Miami (FL) (6–0) (7)	Miami (FL) (7–0) (9)	Miami (FL) (8–0) (8)	Florida State (9–1)	Florida State (10–1)	Florida State (10–1)	Oklahoma (11–1)	3.
4.	Ohio State	Auburn (1–0)	LSU (2–0)	LSU (3–0)	Florida State (4–0)	Notre Dame (3–0)	Florida State (5–1)	Florida State (6–1)	Florida State (6–1)	Florida State (7–1)	Florida State (8–1)	Florida State (9–1)	Syracuse (11–0) (1)	Syracuse (11–0) (1)	Syracuse (11–0) (1)	Syracuse (11–0–1)	4.
5.	Auburn	Ohio State (0–0)	Ohio State (1–0)	Miami (FL) (1–0)	Notre Dame (3–0)	Auburn (3–0–1)	Auburn (4–0–1)	LSU (6–0–1)	LSU (6–0–1)	LSU (7–0–1)	UCLA (8–1)	UCLA (9–1)	Nebraska (9–1)	Nebraska (10–1)	Nebraska (10–1)	LSU (10–1–1)	5.
6.	LSU	LSU (1–0)	Miami (FL) (1–0)	Florida State (3–0)	Auburn (2–0–1)	Florida State (4–1)	LSU (5–0–1)	Auburn (5–0–1)	Auburn (6–0–1)	Auburn (7–0–1)	Syracuse (9–0)	Syracuse (10–0)	LSU (9–1–1)	Auburn (9–1–1)	Auburn (9–1–1)	Nebraska (10–2)	6.
7.	Michigan	Miami (FL) (1–0)	Florida State (2–0)	Ohio State (2–0)	LSU (3–0–1)	LSU (4–0–1)	Clemson (5–0)	Clemson (6–0)	UCLA (6–1)	UCLA (7–1)	Notre Dame (7–1)	Notre Dame (8–1)	Auburn (8–1–1)	LSU (9–1–1)	LSU (9–1–1)	Auburn (9–1–2)	7.
8.	Florida State	Florida State (1–0)	Clemson (2–0)	Notre Dame (2–0)	Clemson (4–0)	Clemson (4–0)	Tennessee (4–0–1)	UCLA (5–1)	Syracuse (7–0)	Syracuse (8–0)	Georgia (7–2)	Clemson (9–1)	South Carolina (8–2)	South Carolina (8–2)	Michigan State (8–2–1)	Michigan State (9–2–1)	8.
9.	Clemson	Michigan (0–0)	Notre Dame (1–0)	Clemson (3–0)	Ohio State (2–0–1)	Ohio State (3–0–1)	UCLA (4–1)	Syracuse (6–0)	Notre Dame (5–1)	Notre Dame (6–1)	Clemson (8–1)	LSU (8–1–1)	Michigan State (8–2–1)	Michigan State (8–2–1)	South Carolina (8–3)	UCLA (10–2)	9.
10.	Miami (FL)	Clemson (1–0)	Washington (2–0)	Arkansas (2–0)	Tennessee (3–0–1)	Tennessee (4–0–1)	Penn State (5–1)	Notre Dame (4–1)	Florida (5–2)	Clemson (7–1)	LSU (7–1–1)	Auburn (8–1–1)	Notre Dame (8–2)	UCLA (9–2)	UCLA (9–2)	Texas A&M (10–2)	10.
11.	Penn State (1)	Penn State (1–0)	Alabama (2–0)	Tennessee (3–0)	UCLA (3–1)	UCLA (4–1)	Notre Dame (3–1)	Florida (5–2)	Indiana (6–1)	Georgia (6–2)	Alabama (7–2)	Michigan State (7–2–1)	UCLA (9–2)	Oklahoma State (9–2)	Oklahoma State (9–2)	Oklahoma State (10–2)	11.
12.	Arkansas	Washington (1–0)	Arkansas (1–0)	Arizona State (2–0)	Michigan (2–1)	Michigan (3–1)	Oklahoma State (5–0)	Georgia (5–2)	Georgia (6–2)	Oklahoma State (7–1)	Auburn (7–1–1)	South Carolina (7–2)	Oklahoma State (9–2)	Notre Dame (8–3)	Notre Dame (8–3)	Clemson (10–2)	12.
13.	Washington	Arkansas (0–0)	UCLA (1–1)	UCLA (2–1)	Arizona State (2–1)	Arizona State (3–1)	Syracuse (5–0)	Tennessee (4–1–1)	Tennessee (5–1–1)	Alabama (6–2)	Michigan State (6–2–1)	Oklahoma State (8–2)	Clemson (9–2)	Clemson (9–2)	Texas A&M (9–2)	Georgia (9–3)	13.
14.	Arizona State	Tennessee (2–0)	Tennessee (3–0)	Michigan (1–1)	Penn State (3–1)	Penn State (4–1)	Florida (4–2)	Michigan State (4–2)	Clemson (6–1)	South Carolina (6–2)	South Carolina (6–2)	Georgia (7–3)	Georgia (7–3)	Georgia (8–3)	Clemson (9–2)	Tennessee (10–2–1)	14.
15.	Texas A&M	Arizona State (0–0)	Arizona State (1–0)	Penn State (2–1)	Texas A&M (2–1)	Alabama (4–1)	Arkansas (4–1)	Indiana (5–1)	Ohio State (5–1–1)	Michigan State (5–2–1)	Penn State (7–2)	Tennessee (7–2–1)	Texas A&M (8–2)	Texas A&M (9–2)	Georgia (8–3)	South Carolina (8–4)	15.
16.	Iowa	Notre Dame (0–0)	Pittsburgh (2–0)	Texas A&M (1–1)	Washington (3–1)	Georgia (4–1)	Oregon (4–1)	Ohio State (4–1–1)	Alabama (5–2)	Penn State (6–2)	Indiana (7–2)	Texas A&M (7–2)	Tennessee (8–2–1)	Tennessee (9–2–1)	USC (8–3)	Iowa (10–3)	16.
17.	Tennessee	Michigan State (1–0)	Michigan State (1–0)	Alabama (2–1)	Alabama (3–1) т	Syracuse (5–0)	Ohio State (3–1–1)	Alabama (5–2)	Oklahoma State (6–1)	Florida (5–3)	Oklahoma State (7–2)	Alabama (7–3)	USC (8–3)	USC (8–3)	Tennessee (9–2–1)	Notre Dame (8–4)	17.
18.	Notre Dame	Pittsburgh (1–0)	Georgia (2–0)	Washington (2–1)	Iowa (3–1) т	Florida (3–2)	Georgia (4–2)	Penn State (5–2)	Penn State (5–2)	Indiana (6–2)	Tennessee (6–2–1)	Iowa (8–3)	Alabama (7–3)	Iowa (9–3)	Iowa (9–3)	USC (8–4)	18.
19.	USC	Alabama (1–0)	Michigan (0–1)	Iowa (2–1)	Florida (3–1)	Oklahoma State (4–0)	Michigan State (3–2)	Oklahoma State (5–1)	South Carolina (5–2)	Tennessee (5–2–1)	Texas A&M (6–2)	Pittsburgh (7–3)	Iowa (9–3)	Pittsburgh (8–3)	Pittsburgh (8–3)	Michigan (8–4)	19.
20.	Florida т Georgia т	Georgia (1–0)	Penn State (1–1)	Georgia (2–1)	Georgia (3–1)	Arkansas (3–1)	Indiana (4–1)	Michigan (4–2)	Michigan State (4–2–1)	Texas A&M (6–2)	Arkansas (7–2)	Indiana (7–3)	Pittsburgh (8–3)	Penn State (8–3)	Penn State (8–3)	Arizona State (7–4–1)	20.
	Preseason Aug 28	Week 1 Sep 8	Week 2 Sep 15	Week 3 Sep 22	Week 4 Sep 29	Week 5 Oct 6	Week 6 Oct 13	Week 7 Oct 20	Week 8 Oct 27	Week 9 Nov 3	Week 10 Nov 10	Week 11 Nov 17	Week 12 Nov 24	Week 13 Dec 1	Week 14 Dec 8	Week 15 (Final) Jan 3	
		Dropped: Texas A&M; Iowa; USC; Florida	None	Dropped: Pittsburgh; Michigan State	Dropped: Arkansas	Dropped: Texas A&M; Washington; Iowa	Dropped: Michigan; Arizona State; Alabama	Dropped: Arkansas; Oregon	Dropped: Michigan	Dropped: Ohio State	Dropped: Florida	Dropped: Penn State; Arkansas	Dropped: Indiana	Dropped: Alabama	None	Dropped: Pittsburgh; Penn State	

== Coaches Poll ==
	Preseason Aug 30	Week 1 Sep 8	Week 2 Sep 15	Week 3 Sep 22	Week 4 Sep 29	Week 5 Oct 6	Week 6 Oct 13	Week 7 Oct 20	Week 8 Oct 27	Week 9 Nov 3	Week 10 Nov 10	Week 11 Nov 17	Week 12 Nov 24	Week 13 Dec 1	Week 14 Dec 8	Week 15 (Final) Jan 3	
1.	Oklahoma	Oklahoma (1–0) (44)	Oklahoma (2–0) (45)	Oklahoma (2–0) (45)	Oklahoma (3–0) (46)	Oklahoma (4–0) (45)	Oklahoma (5–0) (43)	Oklahoma (6–0) (45)	Oklahoma (7–0) (43)	Oklahoma (8–0) (43)	Oklahoma (9–0) (38)	Nebraska (9–0) (21)	Oklahoma (11–0) (48)	Oklahoma (11–0) (41)	Oklahoma (11–0) (41)	Miami (FL) (12–0) (47)	1.
2.	Nebraska	Nebraska (1–0) (1)	Nebraska (2–0) (5)	Nebraska (2–0) (4)	Nebraska (3–0) (3)	Nebraska (4–0) (1)	Nebraska (5–0) (2)	Nebraska (6–0) (3)	Nebraska (7–0) (6)	Nebraska (8–0) (5)	Nebraska (9–0) (10)	Oklahoma (10–0) (27)	Miami (FL) (9–0) (2)	Miami (FL) (10–0) (5)	Miami (FL) (11–0) (8)	Florida State (11–1)	2.
3.	Ohio State	UCLA (1–0) (1)	Auburn (2–0)	Auburn (2–0)	Miami (FL) (2–0) (1)	Miami (FL) (3–0) (4)	Miami (FL) (4–0) (5)	Miami (FL) (4–0) (2)	Miami (FL) (5–0) (1)	Miami (FL) (6–0) (1)	Miami (FL) (7–0) (1)	Miami (FL) (8–0) (1)	Florida State (9–1)	Florida State (10–1)	Florida State (10–1)	Oklahoma (11–1)	3.
4.	UCLA	Auburn (1–0)	Ohio State (1–0)	LSU (3–0)	Florida State (4–0)	Notre Dame (3–0)	Auburn (4–0–1)	LSU (6–0–1)	LSU (6–0–1)	Florida State (7–1)	Florida State (8–1)	Florida State (9–1)	Syracuse (11–0)	Syracuse (11–0)	Syracuse (11–0) (1)	Syracuse (11–0–1)	4.
5.	Auburn	Ohio State (0–0) (1)	LSU (2–0)	Ohio State (2–0)	Notre Dame (3–0)	Auburn (3–0–1)	LSU (5–0–1)	Florida State (6–1)	Florida State (6–1)	LSU (7–0–1)	UCLA (8–1)	UCLA (9–1)	Nebraska (9–1)	Nebraska (10–1)	Nebraska (10–1)	LSU (10–1–1)	5.
6.	Michigan	LSU (1–0) (1)	Miami (FL) (1–0)	Notre Dame (2–0)	Auburn (2–0–1)	LSU (4–0–1)	Clemson (5–0)	Auburn (5–0–1)	Auburn (6–0–1)	Auburn (7–0–1)	Syracuse (9–0)	Syracuse (10–0) (1)	Auburn (8–1–1)	Auburn (9–1–1)	Auburn (9–1–1)	Nebraska (10–2)	6.
7.	Penn State	Miami (FL) (1–0) (1)	Florida State (2–0)	Miami (FL) (1–0) (1)	Clemson (4–0)	Clemson (4–0)	Florida State (5–1)	Clemson (6–0)	UCLA (6–1)	UCLA (7–1)	Notre Dame (7–1)	Notre Dame (8–1)	LSU (9–1–1)	LSU (9–1–1)	LSU (9–1–1)	Auburn (9–1–2)	7.
8.	Arizona State	Michigan (0–0)	Clemson (2–0)	Florida State (3–0)	LSU (3–0–1)	Florida State (4–1)	Tennessee (4–0–1)	UCLA (5–1)	Syracuse (7–0)	Syracuse (8–0) (1)	Georgia (7–2)	Clemson (9–1)	Michigan State (8–2–1)	Michigan State (8–2–1)	Michigan State (8–2–1)	Michigan State (9–2–1)	8.
9.	Miami (FL)	Penn State (1–0) (1)	Notre Dame (1–0)	Clemson (3–0)	Ohio State (2–0–1)	Ohio State (3–0–1)	UCLA (4–1)	Syracuse (6–0)	Notre Dame (5–1)	Notre Dame (6–1)	Clemson (8–1)	Auburn (8–1–1)	South Carolina (8–2)	South Carolina (8–2)	South Carolina (8–3)	Texas A&M (10–2)	9.
10.	Texas A&M т	Clemson (1–0)	Alabama (2–0)	Arkansas (2–0)	Tennessee (3–0)	Tennessee (4–0–1)	Penn State (5–1)	Notre Dame (4–1)	Indiana (6–1)	Clemson (7–1)	Alabama (7–2)	LSU (8–1–1)	UCLA (9–2)	Oklahoma State (9–2)	UCLA (9–2)	Clemson (10–2)	10.
11.	LSU т	Florida State (1–0)	Arkansas (1–0)	Tennessee (3–0)	UCLA (3–1)	UCLA (4–1)	Syracuse (5–0)	Florida (5–2)	Florida (5–2)	Georgia (6–2)	LSU (7–1–1)	Michigan State (7–2–1)	Notre Dame (8–2)	UCLA (9–2)	Oklahoma State (9–2)	UCLA (10–2)	11.
12.	Arkansas	Arkansas (0–0)	Washington (2–0)	Arizona State (2–0)	Penn State (3–1)	Michigan (3–1)	Oklahoma State (5–0)	Indiana (5–1)	Clemson (6–1)	Oklahoma State (7–1)	Auburn (7–1–1)	South Carolina (7–2)	Oklahoma State (9–2)	Texas A&M (9–2)	Clemson (9–2)	Oklahoma State (10–2)	12.
13.	Clemson	Washington (1–0)	Tennessee (3–0)	UCLA (2–1)	Arizona State (2–1)	Arizona State (3–1)	Notre Dame (3–1)	Georgia (5–2)	Tennessee (5–1–1)	Michigan State (5–2–1)	Michigan State (6–2–1)	Oklahoma State (8–2)	Clemson (9–2)	Clemson (9–2)	Texas A&M (9–2)	Tennessee (10–2–1)	13.
14.	Florida State	Arizona State (0–0)	Arizona State (1–0) т	Penn State (2–1)	Michigan (2–1)	Penn State (4–1)	Florida (4–2)	Ohio State (4–1–1)	Georgia (6–2)	South Carolina (6–2)	South Carolina (6–2)	Texas A&M (7–2)	USC (8–3)	Georgia (8–3)	Notre Dame (8–3)	Georgia (9–3)	14.
15.	Washington	Tennessee (2–0)	UCLA (1–1) т	Florida (2–1)	Georgia (3–1)	Georgia (4–1)	Arkansas (4–1)	Michigan State (4–2)	Ohio State (5–1–1)	Alabama (6–2)	Indiana (7–2)	Tennessee (7–2–1)	Texas A&M (8–2)	Notre Dame (8–3)	Georgia (8–3)	South Carolina (8–4)	15.
16.	Notre Dame	Notre Dame (0–0)	Pittsburgh (2–0)	Michigan (1–1)	Washington (3–1)	Syracuse (5–0)	Ohio State (3–1–1)	Tennessee (4–1–1)	Oklahoma State (6–1)	Penn State (6–2)	Penn State (7–2)	Georgia (7–3)	Tennessee (8–2–1)	USC (8–3)	Tennessee (9–2–1)	Iowa (10–3)	16.
17.	Tennessee	Alabama (1–0)	Georgia (2–0)	Texas A&M (1–1)	Syracuse (4–0)	Alabama (4–1)	Georgia (4–2)	Michigan (4–2)	Alabama (5–2)	Indiana (6–2)	Oklahoma State (7–2)	Pittsburgh (7–3)	Georgia (7–3)	Tennessee (9–2–1)	USC (8–3)	USC (8–4)	17.
18.	Iowa	Pittsburgh (1–0)	Michigan State (1–0)	Syracuse (3–0)	Florida (3–1)	Oklahoma State (4–0)	Oregon (4–1)	Alabama (5–2)	Michigan State (4–2–1)	Florida (5–3)	Arkansas (7–2)	USC (7–3)	Penn State (8–3)	Pittsburgh (8–3)	Pittsburgh (8–3)	Michigan (8–4)	18.
19.	Alabama	North Carolina (1–0)	Boston College (2–0)	Georgia (2–1)	Alabama (3–1)	Florida (3–2)	Minnesota (5–0)	Oklahoma State (5–1)	South Carolina (5–2)	Arkansas (6–2)	Tennessee (6–2–1)	Alabama (7–3)	Pittsburgh (8–3)	Penn State (8–3)	Penn State (8–3)	Texas (7–5)	19.
20.	Florida	USC (0–0)	Penn State (1–1)	Washington (2–1)	Oklahoma State (4–0) т; Texas A&M (2–1) т	USC (3–1)	Michigan State (3–2)	South Carolina (4–2)	Arkansas (5–2)	Tennessee (5–2–1)	Texas A&M (6–2)	Iowa (8–3)	Indiana (8–3)	Indiana (8–3); Iowa (9–3)	Indiana (8–3)	Indiana (8–4)	20.
	Preseason Aug 30	Week 1 Sep 8	Week 2 Sep 15	Week 3 Sep 22	Week 4 Sep 29	Week 5 Oct 6	Week 6 Oct 13	Week 7 Oct 20	Week 8 Oct 27	Week 9 Nov 3	Week 10 Nov 10	Week 11 Nov 17	Week 12 Nov 24	Week 13 Dec 1	Week 14 Dec 8	Week 15 (Final) Jan 3	
		Dropped: Texas A&M; Iowa; Florida	Dropped: Michigan; North Carolina; USC	Dropped: Alabama; Pittsburgh; Michigan State; Boston College	Dropped: Arkansas	Dropped: Washington; Texas A&M	Dropped: Michigan; Arizona State; Alabama; USC	Dropped: Penn State; Arkansas; Oregon; Minnesota	Dropped: Michigan	Dropped: Ohio State	Dropped: Florida	Dropped: Indiana; Penn State; Arkansas	Dropped: Alabama; Iowa	None	Dropped: Iowa	Dropped: Notre Dame; Pittsburgh; Penn State	

== USA Today / CNN Top 25 ==
	Final January 4, 1988	
1.	Miami (FL) (12–0) (799)	1.
2.	Florida State (11–1) (1)	2.
3.	Oklahoma (11–1)	3.
4.	Syracuse (11–0–1)	4.
5.	Nebraska (10–2)	5.
	Final January 4, 1988	
