= Nebraska Cornhuskers football under Tom Osborne =

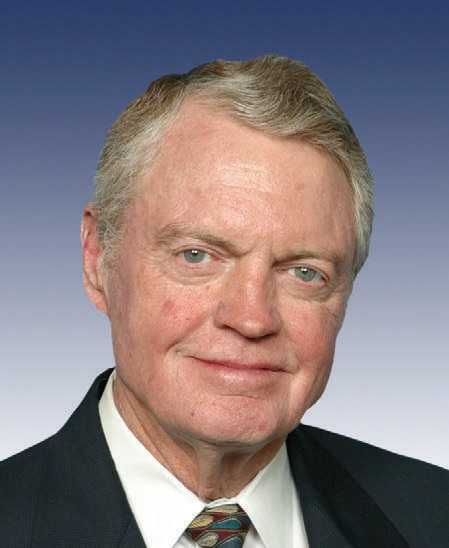
- Athletic director: Bob Devaney; Bill Byrne
- Head coach: Tom Osborne; 25th season, 255–49–3 (.836)
- Location: Lincoln, Nebraska
- Stadium: Memorial Stadium
- Conference: Big Eight; Big 12
- Bowl record: 12–13 (.480)

National championships
- Claimed: 3 (1994, 1995, 1997)
- Unclaimed: 6 (1980, 1981, 1982, 1983, 1984, 1993)

Conference championships
- 13

Division championships
- 2
- Heisman winners: Mike Rozier – 1983
- Consensus All-Americans: 30

Nebraska Cornhuskers football under Tom Osborne covers the University of Nebraska–Lincoln's football program during Tom Osborne's twenty-five-year tenure as head coach.

Osborne joined Bob Devaney's coaching staff in 1962 and was named offensive coordinator in 1969. Osborne's I formation offense led Nebraska to back-to-back national championships and he succeeded Devaney as head coach in 1973. Osborne won at least nine games in each of his twenty-five seasons but struggled against rival Oklahoma early in his tenure. He introduced option concepts to his offense, culminating in record-setting rushing attacks nicknamed "The Scoring Explosion." Nebraska dominated the Big Eight and national scene in the early 1980s, but by the decade's end had been surpassed by southeast opposition. After seven consecutive bowl losses, Osborne broke through in 1994 and won his first national title from a major selector; Nebraska repeated as champion in 1995, a team that is considered among the best ever. Osborne retired in 1997, winning a third national title in his final season.

Osborne is regarded as one of the best coaches in college football history and was inducted into the College Football Hall of Fame in 1999. In addition to the I formation and option, his Nebraska teams are remembered for strong line play, the product of groundbreaking strength and conditioning programs developed under Devaney and Osborne.

== Prelude ==
Bob Devaney was hired at Nebraska in 1962 and led the program to unprecedented national success. By 1967, however, frequent losses to quality opposition raised concerns his teams couldn't regularly compete at the highest level. After consecutive 6–4 seasons, Devaney gave offensive control to thirty-one-year-old I formation disciple Tom Osborne, a move Devaney said "saved his career."

Osborne's later teams were famous for their prolific use of the run-heavy I-form option, but his first offenses relied on a more balanced attack with similarities to modern spread formations. Osborne's I-form design included a wingback, a position made famous at Nebraska by versatile offensive and special teams weapon Johnny Rodgers. Devaney and Osborne hired Boyd Epley, who founded one of the country's first football-focused weightlifting programs and is sometimes considered the "father of modern strength and conditioning." Epley served on Nebraska's football staff until 2006.

Nebraska started 2–2 in Osborne's first year leading the offense but won its final seven games and went undefeated in 1970, winning its first national championship after a chaotic bowl season. Nebraska repeated as champion in a dominant 1971 season highlighted by a 35–31 win over No. 2 Oklahoma in "The Game of the Century." NU's 1971 team is considered among the best in college football history.

Devaney planned to retire but was convinced to return in 1972 to try for an unprecedented third straight title. He named Osborne his successor prior to the season and players later suggested the "murky" chain of command may have hindered the team, which saw its thirty-two-game unbeaten streak end in week one. NU beat Notre Dame 40–6 in the Orange Bowl in Devaney's final game as head coach. Devaney remained at the school and worked with Osborne as athletic director until 1993.

== Osborne's head coaching tenure ==
=== Succeeding a legend (1973–1979) ===
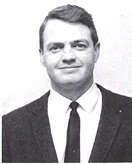
Osborne in 1965 as an offensive assistant

Once the job was his, Osborne promoted Monte Kiffin to defensive coordinator (a position he had unofficially held for several years) and hired Jerry Moore from SMU as his wide receivers coach and primary offensive assistant. Osborne's first game was a 40–13 victory over UCLA in a top-ten matchup on September 8, 1973. Nebraska spent much of the season ranked second nationally but was upset by Missouri in October, Osborne's first head coaching loss. After a loss in Norman to end the regular season (the first meeting between Osborne and Barry Switzer, who succeeded Chuck Fairbanks the same year Osborne replaced Devaney), NU was invited to play in the Cotton Bowl against Southwest champion Texas. The Cornhuskers beat the Longhorns 19–3 on a frigid day in Dallas, Nebraska's fifth consecutive bowl victory.

Quarterback David Humm was Nebraska's most prolific passer of the era; his 5,035 passing yards were a program record for over thirty years. He suffered a concussion during NU's 1974 game against Missouri, Nebraska's second straight loss to the Tigers. Humm recovered to lead the team through the remainder of the season, including a sixth consecutive bowl victory, and finished fifth in Heisman Trophy voting. When Humm graduated, Osborne turned to California transfer Vince Ferragamo to lead his offense. The Cornhuskers began 1976 as the country's top-ranked team but dropped after a week-one tie at LSU. Despite upset losses to Missouri and Iowa State, Nebraska had a chance to win the Big Eight championship against Oklahoma – instead, OU used a pair of fourth-quarter trick plays to complete a ten-point comeback, prompting Switzer to coin the term "Sooner Magic." NU went 4–3 in the Big Eight, the worst conference finish in any of Osborne's twenty-five seasons, and he came to believe he would have been fired if Nebraska lost to Texas Tech in the Astro-Bluebonnet Bowl.

NU opened 1977 with an upset loss to Washington State and head coach Warren Powers, a former defensive assistant under Devaney and Osborne. Nebraska fell out of the AP poll for the first time since 1969, but seven days later gave Alabama its only loss of the season behind 128 rushing yards from Rick Berns and two interceptions from future state governor Jim Pillen. The Cornhuskers again limped to the finish of the regular season, but a late comeback in the Liberty Bowl against North Carolina gave Osborne his fourth bowl victory in five seasons. Nebraska lost a season-opening rematch with Alabama in 1978 but won nine straight games before hosting top-ranked Oklahoma, a team Osborne had yet to defeat. Nebraska sealed a 17–14 victory when Pillen recovered a Billy Sims fumble at NU's three-yard line with 3:28 remaining, the last of ten OU fumbles. The following week, Nebraska – one win away from a likely meeting with Penn State to determine a national champion – was upset by Missouri and new head coach Warren Powers despite a school-record 255 rushing yards from Berns.

Osborne interviewed with Colorado following the 1979 Orange Bowl, later saying "I thought there was enough unhappiness here that maybe I ought to look for a job." CU offered a considerable salary increase and Osborne even traveled to Boulder to meet the team, but he ultimately declined the offer, not wanting the coach against the players he had recruited to Nebraska.

=== The Scoring Explosion (1980–1983) ===
The early years of Osborne's tenure were defined by struggles against Oklahoma and its run-heavy wishbone offense – from 1973 through 1979 OU went 7–1 in the series despite averaging less than five pass attempts per game. Osborne had always used some option concepts but they were limited given the skillsets of pass-first quarterbacks Tagge, Humm, and Ferragamo. By the late 1970s, Osborne was primarily recruiting option-style quarterbacks, beginning with Jeff Quinn, who became Nebraska's starter late in 1979. NU led the country in rushing yards in 1980, the first of eleven times under Osborne. Nebraska was one of four 1980 national champions retroactively selected by David Rothman's FACT but does not claim the title.

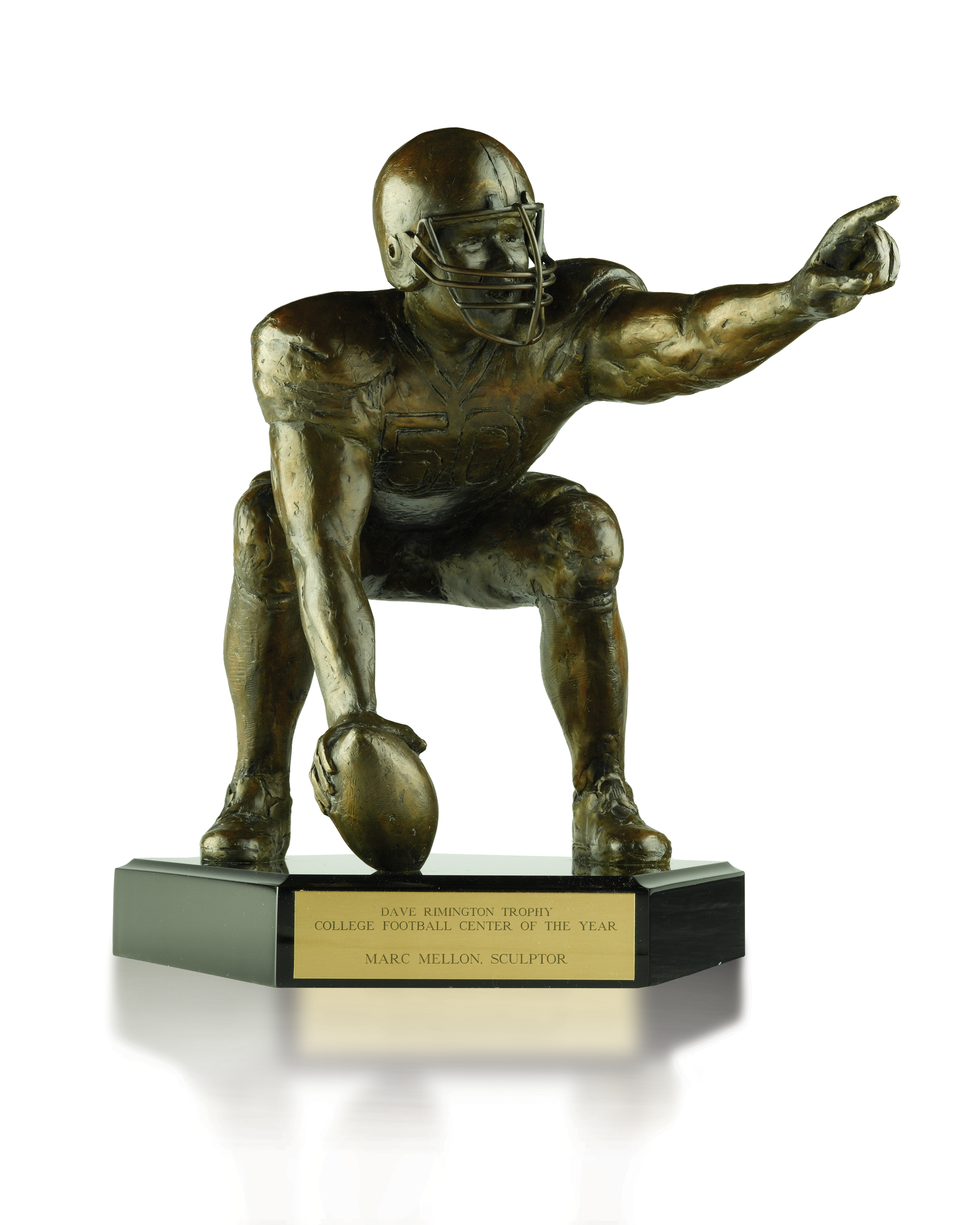
The Rimington Trophy, awarded to the country's best center, is named for two-time All-American Dave Rimington

Osborne's offensive transformation was complete in 1981 when he turned to dual-threat sophomore Turner Gill after a 1–2 start dropped NU out of the national top twenty-five. In Gill's first start, Nebraska set an NCAA record with forty-two first downs in a 59–0 win over Colorado. NU regained its national ranking the following week and did not fall out of the AP poll again until 2002. The Cornhuskers finished 9–2 with Gill and Mark Mauer rotating at quarterback and earned an Orange Bowl bid against undefeated Clemson. The Tigers won 22–15; Nebraska was still selected as co-champion by the National Championship Foundation but does not claim it. Second-ranked Nebraska traveled to Penn State early in 1982 – trailing by three with fourteen seconds remaining, a fifteen-yard Todd Blackledge pass to Mike McCloskey was ruled complete at the NU two-yard line despite McCloskey landing out of bounds. Without replay review to overturn the call, the Nittany Lions scored on the next play to win 27–24. It was Nebraska's only loss – though the Cornhuskers were named national champion by mathematical selector Berryman QPRS, 11–1 Penn State was awarded the title by the AP and coaches.

Nebraska started 1983 ranked No. 1 and won a rematch with Penn State 44–6 in the first Kickoff Classic. Osborne's option attack – led by Gill, Heisman Trophy winner Mike Rozier, and future No. 1 NFL draft pick Irving Fryar – averaged 57.8 points across its five non-conference games and earned the nickname "The Scoring Explosion." Nebraska survived a conference-opening scare against Oklahoma State and marched through the rest of its schedule, finishing 12–0 with an NCAA-record 624 points scored. NU fell behind Miami in the Orange Bowl; trailing 17–0 early in the second quarter, the Cornhuskers converted a fumblerooski, a trick play which had Gill set the ball on the ground to be picked up by All-American guard Dean Steinkuhler, who ran nineteen yards for a touchdown. Nebraska trailed most of the game until Jeff Smith scored with less than a minute remaining to make the score 31–30. Instead of kicking an extra point to tie the game (likely resulting in Nebraska being voted national champion), Osborne elected to go for two and the outright win; Gill's conversion pass fell incomplete. Osborne's 1983 team is considered among the best to not win a major championship.

=== Late-80s regression (1984–1989) ===
Nebraska replaced nine offensive starters in 1984 but the country's top scoring defense kept NU in championship contention. The unit was led by Charlie McBride, who joined Osborne's staff when Monte Kiffin departed in 1976 and was promoted to defensive coordinator in 1982. McBride's 5–2 defense held No. 8 UCLA and No. 9 Oklahoma State to three points each in dominating victories, but Nebraska was denied a national title opportunity when Oklahoma beat the top-ranked Cornhuskers in the season's final week. Nebraska beat LSU in the Sugar Bowl to finish 10–2 and was named national champion by the Litkenhous ranking, the last of five consecutive seasons NU was awarded a title it does not claim. In 1986, sophomore quarterback Steve Taylor accounted for four touchdowns in a week-one win over Florida State in the first night game at Memorial Stadium. Taylor led the country's top scoring offense until an October 25 trip to Boulder; Colorado's 20–10 win was its first over the Cornhuskers in nineteen years. NU beat LSU in the 1987 Sugar Bowl, its last bowl victory until 1994.

After three consecutive victories over Oklahoma early in the 1980s, Nebraska again struggled against the Sooners as the decade progressed – season-finale losses to OU in 1985 and 1986 cost the Cornhuskers any shot at a Big Eight championship. The teams alternated the top spots in the AP poll throughout 1987 and met in November in what was billed as "The Game of the Century II." Oklahoma dominated the second half to upset No. 1 Nebraska and claim the Big Eight outright for the third straight season. NU fell to Florida State in the Fiesta Bowl, the first of seven consecutive bowl losses to southeastern opposition.

Barry Switzer resigned from Oklahoma in 1989 in the wake of sweeping NCAA sanctions, but upstart Colorado ensured Nebraska was not left alone at the top of the Big Eight. When he was hired in 1982, Buffaloes head coach Bill McCartney had loudly declared Nebraska to be Colorado's primary rival to much ridicule, as CU was among the country's worst programs under his predecessor Chuck Fairbanks. McCartney slowly revived Colorado with the flexbone, a wishbone variant which used a pair of "slotbacks" instead of running backs, and defeated NU in 1989 and 1990 to become the first program since World War II to wrest control of the Big Eight from Nebraska and Oklahoma in consecutive seasons. Nebraska's postseason difficulties continued with convincing losses to Miami in the 1989 Orange Bowl and Florida State in the 1990 Fiesta Bowl; the Cornhuskers ended the decade with more wins than any program but had yet to claim a major national title under Osborne.

=== Big Eight dominance and bowl frustration (1990–1993) ===
Nebraska began the 1990s much the same way it finished the previous decade – Colorado won the Big Eight and was named the AP poll's national champion in 1990, while NU ended the season with double-digit losses to unranked Oklahoma and No. 2 Georgia Tech. The Cornhuskers tied Colorado 19–19 in 1991, winning a share of the Big Eight for the second time in seven seasons, but were shut out 22–0 by Miami in the Orange Bowl.

McBride's 5–2 and 3–4 defenses had dominated the run-heavy Big Eight but were proving inadequate to defend the pass-first offenses of Florida State, Miami, and eventually Colorado. Like Devaney decades earlier, Osborne began to copy the blueprint of the programs he was chasing and prioritized the recruitment of fast, athletic players on both sides of the ball, dipping into California and the Deep South to do so. McBride slowly evolved his defense into a 4–3, often asking cornerbacks to play man-to-man coverage and trust NU's "rush ends" to get quick pressure. This defensive transformation took hold in 1992 with star ends Travis Hill and Trev Alberts – McBride fully committed to the 4–3 the same week Nebraska blasted Colorado 52–7 with the teams tied at No. 8 in the AP poll. NU fell to 3–6 Iowa State before clinching the outright Big Eight title with a victory over Kansas State in Tokyo in the 1992 Mirage Bowl. For the bulk of 1992 Osborne's offense was led by true freshman Tommie Frazier, a prized recruit from Bradenton, Florida, who headlined what is considered one of the best recruiting classes in college football history.

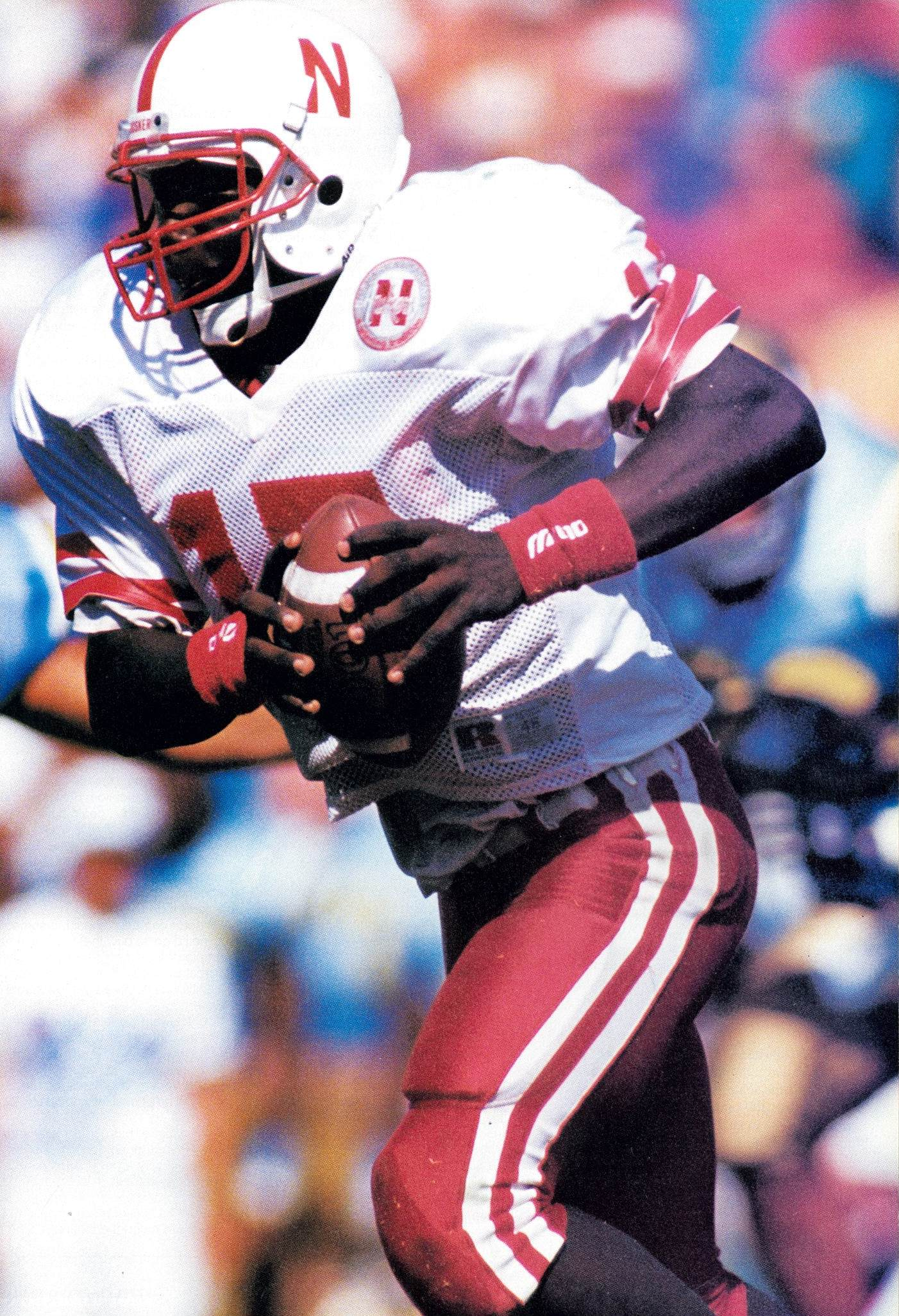
Tommie Frazier in 1993

Led by Frazier, Alberts, and I-back Lawrence Phillips, Nebraska began 1993 11–0, its first undefeated regular season in a decade, and earned an Orange Bowl berth against top-ranked Florida State in the second Bowl Coalition national championship game. The Seminoles were favored by as many as seventeen points but needed a pair of controversial officiating decisions – a block in the back penalty that nullified a Nebraska special teams touchdown and a William Floyd goal-line fumble that was ruled a touchdown – to take a two-point lead with seconds remaining. An FSU penalty and a long Frazier completion quickly drove NU down the field but Byron Bennett missed a forty-five-yard field goal as time expired. The National Champion Foundation named NU a co-champion in 1993 but the school does not claim it. Osborne had Memorial Stadium's scoreboard display the 18–16 final score for the entire offseason.

=== Back-to-back championships (1994–1995) ===
Nebraska opened 1994 with four dominant victories but Frazier departed NU's game against Pacific and was ruled out indefinitely with blood clots in his right knee. Osborne turned to pro-style backup Brook Berringer, a Scottsbluff native whose kind demeanor and gritty performances endeared him to fans. Nebraska fell behind Wyoming in Berringer's first start, but three touchdowns each from Berringer and Phillips led a comeback victory. With Frazier still out and Berringer nursing a collapsed lung, walk-on Matt Turman started at quarterback for an October trip to Manhattan to face No. 16 Kansas State. Center Aaron Graham recalled Nebraska ran the same isolation play over forty times as NU leaned on its experienced offensive line in a 17–6 victory. Berringer returned and guided third-ranked Nebraska to a 24–7 win over No. 2 Colorado – McBride's defense again acted as "Kordell's Kryptonite," shutting down Buffaloes star Kordell Stewart for a third straight meeting.

Frazier returned to start the Orange Bowl against Miami and its strong defensive line led by Nagurski Trophy winner Warren Sapp. Frazier was intercepted in the first quarter as the Hurricanes opened a ten-point lead; Berringer replaced him and led a forty-yard scoring drive before halftime. Miami took a 17–7 lead early in the third quarter but struggled offensively for the rest of the game. Frazier reentered after Berringer was intercepted in the end zone and led a pair of scoring drives, both capped by Cory Schlesinger touchdowns against a worn-down Miami defensive front. Nebraska won 24–17 to give Osborne his first consensus national title as a head coach.

For decades Osborne's program maintained a clean-cut reputation, but by the mid-1990s arrests and accusations surrounded the team. Osborne often took a personal interest in these investigations; Lancaster County attorney Gary Lacey criticized the coach's involvement, which included witness interviews and public declarations of his players' innocence. Osborne defended his tactics, noting the need to determine internal discipline and his belief that football's structured regiment made it an ideal support system. At least six Nebraska players were investigated for violent crimes between 1994 and 1995, including stars Christian Peter and Tyrone Williams, but the most notorious was Phillips. Phillips, who was charged with vandalism and assault in separate 1994 incidents, was suspended indefinitely in September 1995 when he broke into Scott Frost's apartment and assaulted his ex-girlfriend.

Nebraska maintained its record-setting offensive pace after Phillips's suspension two games into 1995. Frazier and freshman I-back Ahman Green led NU to a third consecutive undefeated regular season, defeating three top-ten opponents in a four-week stretch (Kansas State, Colorado, and Kansas) by an average of 28.3 points. Phillips was reinstated prior to the Fiesta Bowl against 12–0 Florida. The Gators used a Frazier interception to take a 10–6 lead but Nebraska scored twenty-nine second-quarter points and took control, intercepting Danny Wuerffel three times in a 62–24 win. Frazier rushed for 199 of NU's 629 yards and was named MVP of a third consecutive national championship game. Nebraska's 1995 team, considered among the best ever, set a college football record with 53.2 points per game and is the only national champion to win every game by at least fourteen points. Osborne's 1994 and 1995 teams join Devaney's 1970 and 1971 teams as the only undefeated back-to-back champions since 1956. Berringer was killed in a plane crash near Lincoln two days before the 1996 NFL draft. Over four thousand people attended his funeral service, where he was eulogized by Osborne and assistant Ron Brown. In 2006 a statue of Osborne and Berringer was erected at Memorial Stadium.

=== Osborne retires on top (1996–1997) ===
In February 1994 the Big Eight announced a merger with the four Texas schools of the Southwest to create the Big 12 Conference. (Note: Baylor, Texas, Texas A&M, and Texas Tech merged with the Big Eight, while Rice, SMU, and TCU joined the WAC and Houston joined Conference USA. Houston, SMU, and TCU later joined the Big 12.) Despite its similarity in name, the Big 12 was an entirely new conference and did not retain Big Eight history or records. The merger took effect in 1996; the Big 12 was split into North and South divisions, which meant Nebraska (in the North) and Oklahoma (in the South) would not play annually for the first time since 1927.

Nebraska began 1996 on a twenty-five-game win streak and ranked No. 1 nationally despite the loss of thirteen starters to graduation. Stanford transfer Scott Frost took over for Frazier at quarterback and struggled in a 19–0 loss to Arizona State in which NU's offense allowed three safeties. Nebraska played its first Big 12 game two weeks later, a 39–3 win over Kansas State, and dominated its conference schedule before being upset by unranked Texas in the inaugural Big 12 Championship Game to prevent a third consecutive national title.

Nebraska started 1997 outside the national top five and Frost was briefly benched (and booed by the home crowd) early in the season. Frost's performance improved in a win at second-ranked Washington and NU was not seriously tested until a November 8 trip to Missouri. Trailing by seven with seconds remaining, top-ranked Nebraska tied the game when a Frost pass into the end zone bounced off the foot of intended receiver Shevin Wiggins and into the hands of Matt Davison. The play became known as the "Flea Kicker" – NU won in overtime but dropped behind Michigan and Florida State in both major rankings. A month later Nebraska beat Texas A&M 54–15 for its first Big 12 title.

On December 10, 1997, Osborne announced he would retire following the Orange Bowl against Tennessee and named longtime assistant Frank Solich his successor. Though Nebraska still trailed Michigan in both major polls, its matchup with Heisman Trophy finalist Peyton Manning and the Volunteers was the designated Bowl Alliance national championship game (the Big Ten-champion Wolverines were required to play in the Rose Bowl, which was not affiliated with the Bowl Alliance). The Cornhuskers controlled the first half and put the game away with three long third-quarter touchdown drives. Ahman Green had 237 scrimmage yards and NU held Manning to 134 passing yards in a 42–17 victory, after which Frost gave an emotional speech lobbying for Nebraska to be voted number one. Nebraska narrowly passed Michigan in the Coaches poll to claim Osborne's third national title in four years.

Nebraska was 60–3 in the final five years of Osborne's tenure; his career record of 255–49–3 gives him the seventh-most wins and fourth-highest win percentage in major college football history. He was inducted into the College Football Hall of Fame in 1999 and is regarded as one of the best coaches in the sport's history.

== After Osborne's retirement ==
Nebraska has struggled to find coaching stability in the decades since Osborne retired. Most of NU's modest success since 1997 came under Solich, Osborne's hand-picked successor, who led NU to the 1999 Big 12 title and an appearance in the 2002 BCS championship game. Athletic director Steve Pederson, hired by Osborne as a recruiting coordinator in 1982, fired Solich after a 9–3 2003 season.

Osborne was elected to Congress in 2001 and represented Nebraska's third district until his third term expired in 2007. After an unsuccessful gubernatorial campaign he returned to the university as athletic director when Pederson was fired. Osborne quickly fired Bill Callahan and conducted a brief coaching search that ended in the hiring of Bo Pelini, who led the program for seven years. Osborne led Nebraska through its transition into the Big Ten Conference and retired as athletic director in 2013. The field at Memorial Stadium and two separate football facilities were dedicated in his honor.

== Seasons ==
Year	Overall	Conference	Standing	Bowl/playoffs	Coaches^{#}	AP^{°}
Big Eight Conference (1973–1995)
1973	9–2–1	4–2–1	T–2nd	W Cotton	T–11	7
1974	9–3	5–2	T–2nd	W Sugar	9	8
1975	10–2	6–1	T–1st	L Fiesta	9	9
1976	9–3–1	4–3	T–4th	W Astro-Bluebonnet	7	9
1977	9–3	5–2	T–2nd	W Liberty	10	12
1978	9–3	6–1	T–1st	L Orange	8	8
1979	10–2	6–1	2nd	L Cotton	7	9
1980	10–2	6–1	2nd	W Sun	7	7
1981	9–3	7–0	1st	L Orange	9	11
1982	12–1	7–0	1st	W Orange	3	3
1983	12–1	7–0	1st	L Orange	2	2
1984	10–2	6–1	T–1st	W Sugar	3	4
1985	9–3	6–1	2nd	L Fiesta	10	11
1986	10–2	5–2	3rd	W Sugar	4	5
1987	10–2	6–1	2nd	L Fiesta	6	6
1988	11–2	7–0	1st	L Orange	10	10
1989	10–2	6–1	2nd	L Fiesta	12	11
1990	9–3	5–2	3rd	L Florida Citrus	T–17	24
1991	9–2–1	6–0–1	T–1st	L Orange	16	15
1992	9–3	6–1	1st	L Orange^{†}	14	14
1993	11–1	7–0	1st	L Orange^{†}	3	3
1994	13–0	7–0	1st	W Orange^{†}	1	1
1995	12–0	7–0	1st	W Fiesta^{†}	1	1
Big 12 Conference (1996–1997)
1996	11–2	8–0	1st (North)	W Orange^{†}	6	6
1997	13–0	8–0	1st (North)	W Orange^{†}	1	2
Total:		255–49–3				
National championship Conference title Conference division title or championship game berth
^{†}Indicates Bowl Coalition or Bowl Alliance bowl.; ^{#}Rankings from final Coaches Poll.; ^{°}Rankings from final AP Poll.

== Players ==
=== Major award winners ===
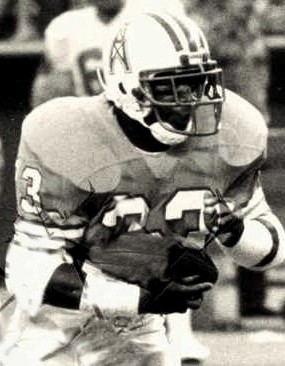
I-back Mike Rozier won the Heisman Trophy, Walter Camp Award, and Maxwell Award in 1983

- Heisman Trophy: Mike Rozier (1983)
- Johnny Unitas Golden Arm Award: Tommie Frazier (1995)
- Butkus Award: Trev Alberts (1993)
- Lombardi Award: Dave Rimington (1982), Dean Steinkuhler (1983), Grant Wistrom (1997)
- Maxwell Award: Mike Rozier (1983)
- Outland Trophy: Dave Rimington (1981, 1982), Dean Steinkuhler (1983), Will Shields (1992), Zach Wiegert (1994), Aaron Taylor (1997)
- Walter Camp Award: Mike Rozier (1983)

=== All-Americans ===
Consensus	Unanimous

Year	Player	Pos.
1973	John Dutton	DT
1973	Daryl White (2)	OT
1974	Rik Bonness	C
1974	Marvin Crenshaw	OT
1974	David Humm	QB
1975	Rik Bonness (2)	C
1975	Bob Martin	DE
1975	Wonder Monds	DB
1976	Dave Butterfield	DB
1976	Vince Ferragamo	QB
1976	Mike Fultz	DT
1977	Tom Davis	C
1978	Kelvin Clark	OT
1978	George Andrews	DE
1979	Junior Miller	TE
1980	Derrie Nelson	DE
1980	Jarvis Redwine	IB
1980	Randy Schleusener	OG
1981	Dave Rimington	C
1981	Jimmy Williams	DE
1982	Dave Rimington (2)	C
1982	Mike Rozier	IB
1983	Irving Fryar	WB
1983	Mike Rozier (2)	IB
1983	Dean Steinkuhler	OG
1984	Bret Clark	DB
1984	Harry Grimminger	OG
1984	Mark Traynowicz	C
1985	Bill Lewis	C
1985	Jim Skow	OT
1986	Danny Noonan	MG
1987	John McCormick	OG
1987	Neil Smith	DT
1987	Steve Taylor	QB
1987	Broderick Thomas	LB
1988	Broderick Thomas (2)	LB
1988	Jake Young	C
1989	Doug Glaser	OT
1989	Jake Young (2)	C
1990	Kenny Walker	DT
1992	Travis Hill	LB
1992	Will Shields	OG
1993	Trev Alberts	LB
1994	Brenden Stai	OG
1994	Ed Stewart	LB
1994	Zach Wiegert	OT
1995	Tommie Frazier	QB
1995	Aaron Graham	C
1995	Jared Tomich	DE
1996	Aaron Taylor	C
1996	Jared Tomich (2)	DE
1996	Grant Wistrom	DE
1997	Jason Peter	DT
1997	Aaron Taylor (2)	OG
1997	Grant Wistrom (2)	DE
