= 1987 Missouri Tigers football team =

American college football season

1987 Missouri Tigers football
- Conference: Big Eight Conference
- Record: 5–6 (3–4 Big 8)
- Head coach: Woody Widenhofer (3rd season)
- Offensive coordinator: Wright Anderson (1st season)
- Home stadium: Faurot Field

1987 Big Eight Conference football standings
	Conf.					Overall
Team	W		L		T	W		L		T
No. 3 Oklahoma $	7	–	0	–	0	11	–	1	–	0
No. 6 Nebraska	6	–	1	–	0	10	–	2	–	0
No. 11 Oklahoma State	5	–	2	–	0	10	–	2	–	0
Colorado	4	–	3	–	0	7	–	4	–	0
Missouri	3	–	4	–	0	5	–	6	–	0
Iowa State	2	–	5	–	0	3	–	8	–	0
Kansas	0	–	6	–	1	1	–	9	–	1
Kansas State	0	–	6	–	1	0	–	10	–	1
$ – Conference champion; Rankings from AP Poll

The 1987 Missouri Tigers football team was an American football team that represented the University of Missouri in the Big Eight Conference (Big 8) during the 1987 NCAA Division I-A football season. The team compiled a 5–6 record (3–4 against Big 8 opponents), finished in fifth place in the Big 8, and outscored its opponents by a combined total of 226 to 209. Woody Widenhofer was the head coach for the third of four seasons. The team played its home games at Faurot Field in Columbia, Missouri.

The team's statistical leaders included Robert Delpino with 750 rushing yards, John Stollenwerck with 831 passing yards, and Craig Lammers with 253 receiving yards.

== Schedule ==
Date	Opponent	Site	Result	Attendance	Source
September 12	Baylor*	Faurot Field; Columbia, MO	W 23–18	37,172	
September 19	Northwestern*	Faurot Field; Columbia, MO	W 28–3	36,549	
September 26	at Indiana*	Memorial Stadium; Bloomington, IN	L 17–20	41,145	
October 3	Syracuse*	Faurot Field; Columbia, MO	L 13–24	36,773	
October 10	Kansas State	Faurot Field; Columbia, MO	W 34–10	40,772	
October 17	at Iowa State	Cyclone Stadium; Ames, IA (rivalry)	W 42–17	35,888	
October 24	No. 19 Oklahoma State	Faurot Field; Columbia, MO	L 20–24	37,638	
October 31	No. 2 Nebraska	Faurot Field; Columbia, MO (rivalry)	L 7–42	55,594	
November 7	at Colorado	Folsom Field; Boulder, CO	L 10–27	44,050	
November 14	at No. 1 Oklahoma	Oklahoma Memorial Stadium; Norman, OK (rivalry)	L 13–17	75,004	
November 21	Kansas	Faurot Field; Columbia, MO (Border War)	W 19–7	32,202	
*Non-conference game; Rankings from AP Poll released prior to the game

== Roster ==
1987 Missouri Tigers football team roster
Players
Coaches
Offense

Pos.	#	Name	Class
OT	75	Carl Bax	Jr
RB		Robert Delpino	Sr
RB		Tommie Stowers

Defense

Pos.	#	Name	Class
DE		Jeff Cross	Sr
FS		Erik McMillan	Sr

Special teams

Pos.	#	Name	Class

Head coach

- Woody Widenhofer

Coordinators/assistant coaches

- Wright Anderson – Offensive coordinator
- Carl Reese – Defensive coordinator
- James McKinley – Linebacker
- George Wheeler – Defensive line
- Ray Zingler – Assistant
- Mike Wade – Assistant
- Charles Coe – Assistant
- Steve Miller – Assistant
- Bill McConnell – Assistant

Legend

- (C) Team captain
- (S) Suspended
- (I) Ineligible
- Injured
- Redshirt
