= 1987 Kansas State Wildcats football team =

American college football season

1987 Kansas State Wildcats football
- Conference: Big Eight Conference
- Record: 0–10–1 (0–6–1 Big 8)
- Head coach: Stan Parrish (2nd season)
- Offensive coordinator: Mike Deal (1st season)
- Defensive coordinator: Jerry Hartman (2nd season)
- Home stadium: KSU Stadium

1987 Big Eight Conference football standings
	Conf.					Overall
Team	W		L		T	W		L		T
No. 3 Oklahoma $	7	–	0	–	0	11	–	1	–	0
No. 6 Nebraska	6	–	1	–	0	10	–	2	–	0
No. 11 Oklahoma State	5	–	2	–	0	10	–	2	–	0
Colorado	4	–	3	–	0	7	–	4	–	0
Missouri	3	–	4	–	0	5	–	6	–	0
Iowa State	2	–	5	–	0	3	–	8	–	0
Kansas	0	–	6	–	1	1	–	9	–	1
Kansas State	0	–	6	–	1	0	–	10	–	1
$ – Conference champion; Rankings from AP Poll

The 1987 Kansas State Wildcats football team represented Kansas State University in the 1987 NCAA Division I-A football season. The team's head football coach was Stan Parrish. The Wildcats played their home games in KSU Stadium. They finished with a record of 0–10–1 overall and 0–6–1 in Big Eight Conference play. Kansas State scored 135 points and gave up 421 points.

== Schedule ==
Date	Opponent	Site	Result	Attendance	Source
September 5	Austin Peay*	KSU Stadium; Manhattan, KS	L 22–26	23,350	
September 19	Army*	KSU Stadium; Manhattan, KS	L 14–41	27,500	
September 26	at No. 19 Iowa*	Kinnick Stadium; Iowa City, IA	L 13–38	67,700	
October 3	Tulsa*	KSU Stadium; Manhattan, KS	L 25–37	28,400	
October 10	at Missouri	Faurot Field; Columbia, MO	L 10–34	40,772	
October 17	No. 1 Oklahoma^{†}	KSU Stadium; Manhattan, KS	L 10–59	27,200	
October 24	at No. 2 Nebraska	Memorial Stadium; Lincoln, NE (rivalry)	L 3–56	76,106	
October 31	at No. 12 Oklahoma State	Lewis Field; Stillwater, OK	L 7–56	40,150	
November 7	Kansas	KSU Stadium; Manhattan, KS (rivalry)	T 17–17	37,600	
November 14	at Iowa State	Cyclone Stadium; Ames, IA (rivalry)	L 14–16	33,516	
November 21	Colorado	KSU Stadium; Manhattan, KS (rivalry)	L 0–41	12,500	
*Non-conference game; ^{†}Homecoming; Rankings from AP Poll released prior to the game

== Game summaries ==
=== At Nebraska ===
Kansas State Wildcats (0–6) at #2 Nebraska Cornhuskers (6–0)

Quarter	1	2	3	4	Total
Kansas St	0	3	0	0	3
Nebraska	21	14	14	7	56

at Memorial Stadium, Lincoln, Nebraska

- Date: October 24, 1987
- Game attendance: 76,106
- Box Score

Nebraska secured their 26th consecutive winning season, tying the NCAA record, and rolled up 459 rushing yards using 17 rushing players, while the Cornhusker defense prevented a touchdown for the third game in a row.

Team	Category	Player	Statistics
Kansas St	Passing	Gary Swim	12/29, 118 Yds, INT
Kansas St	Rushing	Lee Pickett	9 Rush, 44 Yds
Kansas St	Receiving	Kent Dean	5 Rec, 59 Yds
Nebraska	Passing	Clete Blakeman	9/10, 165 Yds, TD
Nebraska	Rushing	Tyreese Knox	8 Rush, 100 Yds, TD
Nebraska	Receiving	Todd Millikan	3 Rec, 46 Yds

Scoring summary

Quarter	Time	Drive			Team	Scoring information	Score	
Quarter	Time	Plays	Yards	TOP	Team	Scoring information	KSU	NU
1	13:18	3	66		Nebraska	Steve Taylor 49-yard touchdown run, Chris Drennan kick good	0	7
1	8:23	10	39		Nebraska	Tom Banderas 15-yard touchdown reception from Steve Taylor, Chris Drennan kick good	0	14
1	0:25	10	80		Nebraska	Richard Bell 46-yard touchdown run, Chris Drennan kick good	0	21
2	7:07	10	56		Nebraska	Clete Blakeman 1-yard touchdown run, Chris Drennan kick good	0	28
2	2:24	3	1		Kansas St	29-yard field goal by Mark Porter	3	28
2	0:00	7	88		Nebraska	Hendley Hawkins 40-yard touchdown reception from Clete Blakeman, Chris Drennan kick good	3	35
3	8:17	7	47		Nebraska	Micah Heibel 3-yard touchdown run, Chris Drennan kick good	3	42
3	0:41	10	83		Nebraska	Gerry Gdowski 10-yard touchdown run, Chris Drennan kick good	3	49
4	10:53	3	63		Nebraska	Tyreese Knox 50-yard touchdown run, Chris Drennan kick good	3	56
"TOP" = time of possession. For other American football terms, see Glossary of American football.							3	56

== Roster ==
1987 Kansas State Wildcats football team roster
Players
Coaches
Offense

Pos.	#	Name	Class
WR	89	Eric Blades	So
TE	48	Brent Cotton	Sr
WR	87	Todd Cowings	Sr
TE	80	Kent Dean	Sr
RB	27	Tom Dillon	So
OL	70	Chad Faulkner	So
OL		Matt Garver
QB	12	Tim Hanson	Sr
RB	28	Maurice Henry	So
WR	83	Dan Hughes	Sr
RB	29	Tony Jordan	Sr
RB		Rick Lewis
OL		Will McCain
RB	30	Lee Pickett	Jr
RB		Terry Richards
OL		Russ Strange
QB	10	Carl Straw	Fr
QB	15	Gary Swim	Jr
WR		Lawrence Tolbert
WR	88	John Williams	So
RB		Ray Wilson
OL		Eric Zabelin

Defense

Pos.	#	Name	Class
DB	22	Mark Austin	Jr
LB		Dewayne Baziel
DL	98	Doug Blackbourne	Jr
DB		Robert Easterwood
DB	6	Erick Harper	So
DB		Tyreese Herds
DB		Brad Lambert
DL		Bobby Lawrence
DL		Tim MacDonald
DB	16	Marcus Miller	So
LB	34	Grady Newton	Sr
DL		Jim Oehm
LB	33	David Wallace	Sr
LB	59	Matt Wallerstedt	Sr
LB		Lorne Whittle
DT	99	Brandon Wackerly	Jr

Special teams

Pos.	#	Name	Class
P		David Kruger
P		Ken Olson
K	1	Mark Porter	Jr
P		Shane Pouch

Head coach

- Stan Parrish

Coordinators/assistant coaches

- Mike Deal – Offensive Coordinator
- Jerry Hartman – Defensive Coordinator
- Rich Rachel – Assistant head coach
- Dave Flegal – Assistant
- Dale Steele – Assistant
- Mark Deal – Assistant
- Bill Singler – Assistant
- L. C. Cole – Assistant

Legend

- (C) Team captain
- (S) Suspended
- (I) Ineligible
- Injured
- Redshirt
