= 1987 Oklahoma State Cowboys football team =

American college football season

1987 Oklahoma State Cowboys football

Sun Bowl champion

Sun Bowl, W 35–33 vs. West Virginia
- Conference: Big Eight Conference

Ranking
- Coaches: No. 12
- AP: No. 11
- Record: 10–2 (5–2 Big 8)
- Head coach: Pat Jones (4th season)
- Offensive coordinator: Larry Coker (5th season)
- Defensive coordinator: Louis Campbell (3rd season)
- Home stadium: Lewis Field

1987 Big Eight Conference football standings
	Conf.					Overall
Team	W		L		T	W		L		T
No. 3 Oklahoma $	7	–	0	–	0	11	–	1	–	0
No. 6 Nebraska	6	–	1	–	0	10	–	2	–	0
No. 11 Oklahoma State	5	–	2	–	0	10	–	2	–	0
Colorado	4	–	3	–	0	7	–	4	–	0
Missouri	3	–	4	–	0	5	–	6	–	0
Iowa State	2	–	5	–	0	3	–	8	–	0
Kansas	0	–	6	–	1	1	–	9	–	1
Kansas State	0	–	6	–	1	0	–	10	–	1
$ – Conference champion; Rankings from AP Poll

The 1987 Oklahoma State Cowboys football team represented Oklahoma State University in the 1987 NCAA Division I-A college football season. The Cowboys finished the regular season with a 9–2 record. Thurman Thomas was in his senior year for the Cowboys. In his career at Oklahoma State, Thomas had 897 rushes for 4,595 yards, 43 touchdowns, and 21 100-yard rushing games. He was also a Heisman Trophy candidate and a first team selection on the College Football All-America Team in 1987. In the 1987 Sun Bowl, Thomas ran for 157 yards and four touchdowns in the 35–33 victory over West Virginia, keeping Barry Sanders on the sidelines for the majority of the game. Thomas left OSU as the school's all-time leading rusher and his number 34 is one of only three jerseys retired at Oklahoma State. Sanders replaced Thomas as starter the next year in 1988.

== Schedule ==
Date	Opponent	Rank	Site	TV	Result	Attendance	Source
September 5	Tulsa*		Boone Pickens Stadium; Stillwater, OK (rivalry)		W 39–28	46,700	
September 12	at Houston*		Houston Astrodome; Houston, TX		W 35–0	16,285	
September 19	at Wyoming*		War Memorial Stadium; Laramie, WY		W 35–29	20,852	
September 26	Southwestern Louisiana*		Lewis Field; Stillwater, OK		W 36–0	44,100	
October 10	Colorado	No. 19	Lewis Field; Stillwater, OK		W 42–17	42,800	
October 17	No. 2 Nebraska	No. 12	Lewis Field; Stillwater, OK	CBS	L 0–35	50,440	
October 24	at Missouri	No. 19	Faurot Field; Columbia, MO		W 24–20	37,638	
October 31	Kansas State^{†}	No. 17	Lewis Field; Stillwater, OK		W 56–7	40,150	
November 7	at No. 1 Oklahoma	No. 12	Oklahoma Memorial Stadium; Norman, OK (Bedlam)		L 10–29	75,004	
November 14	at Kansas	No. 17	Memorial Stadium; Lawrence KS		W 49–17	18,200	
November 21	Iowa State	No. 13	Lewis Field; Stillwater, OK		W 48–27	33,400	
December 25	vs. West Virginia*	No. 11	Sun Bowl; El Paso, TX (Sun Bowl)	CBS	W 35–33	43,240	
*Non-conference game; ^{†}Homecoming; Rankings from AP Poll released prior to the game

== Game summaries ==
=== Colorado ===
	1	2	3	4	Total
Colorado	0	10	7	0	17
Oklahoma St	14	0	14	14	42

- OSU - Sanders 4 Run (Blanchard kick)
- OSU - Dykes 18 Gundy (Blanchard kick)
- COL - Simmons 7 Run (Hannah kick)
- COL - Hannah 32 FG
- OSU - Williams 16 Gundy (Blanchard kick)
- OSU - Thomas 5 Run (Blanchard kick)
- COL - Bieniemy 6 Run (Hannah kick)
- OSU - Limbrick 3 Run (Blanchard kick)
- OSU - Sanders 73 punt return (Blanchard kick)
- Passing: COL Aunese 5/11, 90 Yds, INT, OSU Gundy 21/28, 257 Yds, 2 TD, INT
- Rushing: COL Flannagan 9/52, OSU Thomas 23/110
- Receiving: COL Carl 3/61, OSU Dykes 8/114, TD

== Roster ==
1987 Oklahoma State Cowboys football team roster
Players
Coaches
Offense

Pos.	#	Name	Class
WR	11	Hart Lee Dykes	Jr
QB	12	Mike Gundy	So
RB	21	Barry Sanders	So
RB	34	Thurman Thomas	Sr

Defense

Pos.	#	Name	Class
LB	53	Sim Drain III	So
LB		Ricky Shaw	Sr

Special teams

Pos.	#	Name	Class

Head coach

- Pat Jones

Coordinators/assistant coaches

- Larry Coker – Offensive coordinator
- Houston Nutt – Quarterback/Wide receivers
- Bill Shimek – Running backs
- Steve Gardner – Tight ends
- Brad Seely – Offensive line
- Louis Campbell – Defensive coordinator/defensive backs
- George Walstad – Defensive line
- Kenith Pope – Defensive ends
- Jonny Barr – Linebackers

Legend

- (C) Team captain
- (S) Suspended
- (I) Ineligible
- Injured
- Redshirt

== Awards and honors ==
- Thurman Thomas: Heisman Trophy finalist, All-America

== After the season ==
The 1988 NFL draft was held on April 24–25, 1988. The following Cowboys were selected.

Round	Pick	Player	Position	NFL club
2	40	Thurman Thomas	Running back	Buffalo Bills
4	92	Ricky Shaw	Linebacker	New York Giants
