= 1987 Colorado Buffaloes football team =

American college football season

1987 Colorado Buffaloes football
- Conference: Big Eight Conference
- Record: 7–4 (4–3 Big 8)
- Head coach: Bill McCartney (6th season)
- Offensive coordinator: Gerry DiNardo (4th season)
- Offensive scheme: Wishbone
- Defensive coordinator: Lou Tepper (5th season)
- Base defense: 3–4
- MVP: Mickey Pruitt
- Captains: Mark Hatcher; Barry Helton; Mickey Pruitt
- Home stadium: Folsom Field

1987 Big Eight Conference football standings
	Conf.					Overall
Team	W		L		T	W		L		T
No. 3 Oklahoma $	7	–	0	–	0	11	–	1	–	0
No. 6 Nebraska	6	–	1	–	0	10	–	2	–	0
No. 11 Oklahoma State	5	–	2	–	0	10	–	2	–	0
Colorado	4	–	3	–	0	7	–	4	–	0
Missouri	3	–	4	–	0	5	–	6	–	0
Iowa State	2	–	5	–	0	3	–	8	–	0
Kansas	0	–	6	–	1	1	–	9	–	1
Kansas State	0	–	6	–	1	0	–	10	–	1
$ – Conference champion; Rankings from AP Poll

The 1987 Colorado Buffaloes football team represented the University of Colorado at Boulder in the Big Eight Conference during the 1987 NCAA Division I-A football season. Led by sixth-year head coach Bill McCartney, Colorado finished the regular season at 7–4 (4–3 in Big 8, fourth), but did not receive a bowl invitation.

== Schedule ==
Date	Time	Opponent	Site	TV	Result	Attendance	Source
September 12	12:00 pm	Oregon*	Folsom Field; Boulder, CO	KCNC	L 7–10	40,521	
September 19	12:00 pm	Stanford*	Folsom Field; Boulder, CO	KCNC	W 31–17	45,073	
September 26	1:00 pm	Washington State*	Folsom Field; Boulder, CO		W 26–17	43,527	
October 3	1:00 pm	at Colorado State*	Hughes Stadium; Fort Collins, CO (rivalry)		W 29–16	38,129	
October 10	1:00 pm	at No. 19 Oklahoma State	Lewis Field; Stillwater, OK		L 17–42	42,800	
October 17	12:00 pm	Kansas^{†}	Folsom Field; Boulder, CO	KCNC	W 35–10	43,514	
October 24	5:30 pm	at No. 1 Oklahoma	Oklahoma Memorial Stadium; Norman, OK	ESPN	L 6–24	75,004	
October 31	12:30 pm	at Iowa State	Cyclone Stadium; Ames, IA		W 42–10	34,920	
November 7	12:00 pm	Missouri	Folsom Field; Boulder, CO	KCNC	W 27–10	44,050	
November 21	12:10 pm	at Kansas State	KSU Stadium; Manhattan, KS (rivalry)		W 41–0	12,500	
November 28	2:00 pm	No. 5 Nebraska	Folsom Field; Boulder, CO (rivalry)	ESPN	L 7–24	52,026	
*Non-conference game; ^{†}Homecoming; Rankings from AP Poll released prior to the game; All times are in Mountain time

== Game summaries ==
=== Washington State ===
	1	2	3	4	Total
Washington St	7	0	3	7	17
Colorado	3	16	0	7	26

- Attendance: 43,527
- COL: Culbertson 25 FG
- WSU: Swinton 13 Rosenbach (Adams kick)
- COL: Culbertson 27 FG
- COL: Pruitt 18 Interception (Culbertson kick)
- COL: Flannigan 3 Run (kick failed)
- WSU: Adams 32 FG
- WSU: Leighton 16 Rosenbach (Adams kick)
- COL: Aunese 22 Run (Hannah kick)
- Passing: WSU Rosenbach 26/52, 264 Yds, 2 TD, 2 INT, COL Aunese 1/3, 30 Yds
- Rushing: WSU Rosenbach 15/34, COL Aunese 22/185, TD
- Receiving: WSU Broussard 8/55, COL Bieniemy 1/30

== Roster ==
1987 Colorado Buffaloes football team roster
Players
Coaches
Offense

Pos.	#	Name	Class
QB	8	Sal Aunese	So
RB	46	Eric Bieniemy	Fr
SE	25	Drew Ferrando	Sr
RB	29	J.J. Flannigan	So
QB	6	Mark Hatcher (C)	Sr
RB		O.C. Oliver
FB	42	Michael Simmons	Fr
QB		Rick Wheeler

Defense

Pos.	#	Name	Class
CB	12	Dave McCloughan	Fr
LB	96	Kanavis McGhee	Fr
SS		Mickey Pruitt (C)	Sr
LB	94	Alfred Williams	Fr

Special teams

Pos.	#	Name	Class
P		Barry Helton (C)	Sr

Head coach

- Bill McCartney (6th year)

Coordinators/assistant coaches

- Gerry DiNardo (OC)
- Lou Tepper (DC)

Legend

- (C) Team captain
- (S) Suspended
- (I) Ineligible
- Injured
- Redshirt

Roster
