= 1987 Kansas Jayhawks football team =

American college football season

1987 Kansas Jayhawks football
- Conference: Big Eight Conference
- Record: 1–9–1 (0–6–1 Big 8)
- Head coach: Bob Valesente (2nd season)
- Captain: Game captains
- Home stadium: Memorial Stadium

1987 Big Eight Conference football standings
	Conf.					Overall
Team	W		L		T	W		L		T
No. 3 Oklahoma $	7	–	0	–	0	11	–	1	–	0
No. 6 Nebraska	6	–	1	–	0	10	–	2	–	0
No. 11 Oklahoma State	5	–	2	–	0	10	–	2	–	0
Colorado	4	–	3	–	0	7	–	4	–	0
Missouri	3	–	4	–	0	5	–	6	–	0
Iowa State	2	–	5	–	0	3	–	8	–	0
Kansas	0	–	6	–	1	1	–	9	–	1
Kansas State	0	–	6	–	1	0	–	10	–	1
$ – Conference champion; Rankings from AP Poll

The 1987 Kansas Jayhawks football team represented the University of Kansas as a member of the Big Eight Conference during the 1987 NCAA Division I-A football season. In their second and final season under head coach Bob Valesente, the Jayhawks compiled an overall record of 1–9–1 with a mark of 0–6–1 against conference opponents, tied for in seventh place in the Big 8, and were outscored by opponents by a combined total of 398 to 135. The team played home games at Memorial Stadium in Lawrence, Kansas.

The team's statistical leaders included Kelly Donohoe with 981 passing yards, Arnold Snell with 691 rushing yards, and Willie Vaughn with 672 receiving yards. Team captains were selected game-by-game.

== Schedule ==
Date	Opponent	Site	TV	Result	Attendance	Source
September 12	at No. 4 Auburn*	Jordan-Hare Stadium; Auburn, AL		L 0–49	65,711	
September 19	Kent State*	Memorial Stadium; Lawrence, KS		L 17–31	33,700	
September 26	Louisiana Tech*	Memorial Stadium; Lawrence, KS		L 11–16	23,000	
October 3	Southern Illinois*	Memorial Stadium; Lawrence, KS		W 16–15	20,500	
October 10	at No. 2 Nebraska	Memorial Stadium; Lincoln, NE (rivalry)		L 2–54	76,053	
October 17	at Colorado	Folsom Field; Boulder, CO	KCNC	L 10–35	43,514	
October 24	Iowa State^{†}	Memorial Stadium; Lawrence, KS		L 28–42	28,300	
October 31	No. 1 Oklahoma	Memorial Stadium; Lawrence, KS		L 10–71	23,500	
November 7	at Kansas State	KSU Stadium; Manhattan, KS (Sunflower Showdown)		T 17–17	37,600	
November 14	No. 17 Oklahoma State	Memorial Stadium; Lawrence, KS		L 17–49	18,200	
November 21	at Missouri	Faurot Field; Columbia, MO (Border War)		L 7–19	32,202	
*Non-conference game; ^{†}Homecoming; Rankings from AP Poll released prior to the game
