= Tom Osborne =

American football coach and politician (born 1937)

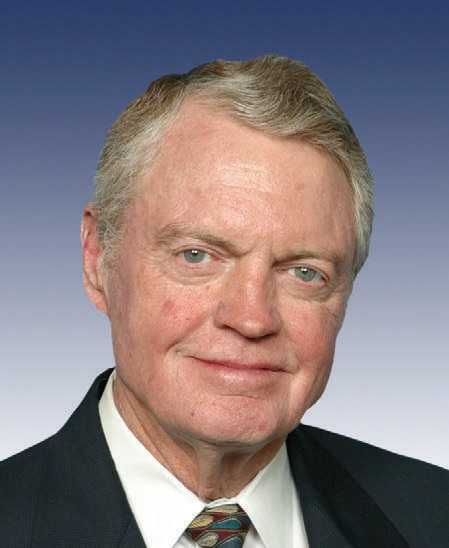

Member of the U.S. House of Representatives from Nebraska's 3rd district
- In office January 3, 2001 – January 3, 2007
- Preceded by: Bill Barrett
- Succeeded by: Adrian Smith

Personal details
- Born: Thomas William Osborne; February 23, 1937 (age 89) Hastings, Nebraska, U.S.
- Party: Republican
- Spouse: Nancy Tederman (m. 1962)
- Children: 3
- Education: Hastings College (BA); University of Nebraska (MA, PhD)
- Football career

Personal information
- Listed height: 6 ft 3 in (1.91 m)
- Listed weight: 190 lb (86 kg)

Career information
- Position: Wide receiver (No. 84)
- High school: Hastings (Hastings, Nebraska)
- College: Hastings (1955–1958)
- NFL draft: 1959: 19th round, 222nd overall pick

Career history

Playing
- San Francisco 49ers (1959); Washington Redskins (1960–1961)

Coaching
- Nebraska (1964–1968) Assistant coach; Nebraska (1969–1972) Offensive coordinator; Nebraska (1973–1997) Head coach

Operations
- Nebraska (1979–1998) Assistant athletic director; Nebraska (2007–2013) Athletic director

Awards and highlights
- Coaching: 3× national champion (1994, 1995, 1997); 12× Big Eight champion (1975, 1978, 1981–1984, 1988, 1991–1995); Big 12 champion (1997); 2× Big 12 North Division champion (1996, 1997); Bobby Dodd Coach of the Year (1978); ESPN Coach of the Decade (1999); National Coach of the Year (1994); Jim Thorpe Lifetime Achievement Award; Big 12 Coach of the Year (1996); 7× Big Eight Coach of Year (1975, 1976, 1980, 1988, 1992–1994)

Head coaching record
- Regular season: 243–36–3 (.867)
- Postseason: 12–13 (.480)
- Career: 255–49–3 (.836)
- Stats at Pro Football Reference
- College Football Hall of Fame
- Scientific career
- Fields: Educational psychology
- Thesis: The Effects of Instructions on Situational Anxiety Level and Examination Performance (1965)
- Doctoral advisors: Warren Bailer; Robert Ross

Thomas William Osborne (born February 23, 1937) is an American former football player, coach, college athletics administrator, and politician from Nebraska. He served as head football coach of the Nebraska Cornhuskers from 1973 to 1997 (25 seasons). After being inducted into the College Football Hall of Fame in 1999, Osborne was elected to Congress in 2000 from Nebraska's third district as a Republican. He served three terms (2001–2007), returned to the University of Nebraska–Lincoln as athletic director in 2007, and retired in 2013.

Osborne played college football as a quarterback and wide receiver at Hastings College, and soon after finishing his brief National Football League (NFL) career, he was hired by Nebraska head coach Bob Devaney as an assistant. Osborne was named Devaney's successor in 1973, and over the next 25 years established himself as one of the best coaches in college football history with his trademark I-formation offense and revolutionary strength, conditioning, and nutrition programs. He retired with a career record of 255–49–3 (.836), 13 conference titles, and three national championships. He coached 53 All-Americans, including 1983 Heisman Trophy winner Mike Rozier.

== Early life ==
Born and raised in Hastings, a town in rural central Nebraska, Osborne was a star athlete at Hastings High School in football, basketball, and track. As a senior in 1955, he was named Nebraska High School Athlete of The Year by the Omaha World-Herald. He graduated from Hastings College with a BA in history in 1959. Osborne earned a Master's degree in educational psychology in 1963 and completed his doctorate in 1965, both at the University of Nebraska. Osborne's first job at the university was counselor in the Selleck Quadrangle, where he oversaw a floor of freshmen football players. He also served in the Nebraska Army National Guard from 1960 to 1966.

== Playing career ==
At Hastings, Osborne quarterbacked the football team and became the first male athlete in Nebraska to be named both the high school (1955) and college (1959) athlete of the year by the Omaha World-Herald. He was also the 1958 recipient of the Emil S. Liston Award, which was given annually to the most outstanding National Association of Intercollegiate Athletics NAIA junior basketball player who displayed high athletic and scholastic achievement.

=== San Francisco 49ers ===
Osborne was selected in the nineteenth round (222nd overall) of the 1959 NFL draft by the San Francisco 49ers. He was eventually released by the 49ers without playing in a regular season game.

=== Washington Redskins ===
The Washington Redskins picked up Osborne in 1960 and he made his NFL debut on November 6 against the St. Louis Cardinals. He had one reception for eight yards in a 44–6 Redskins loss. In his second game a few weeks later, Osborne caught six passes for 38 yards against the Cleveland Browns, but Washington lost again, 27–16.

Osborne saw more playing time in 1961, starting twelve games. He scored his first career touchdown against the Browns in Week 4, and his second against the Cardinals in Week 12. Osborne's last career game, a 34–24 Washington win over Dallas, was his only career victory.

== Coaching career ==
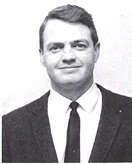
Osborne, c. 1965

=== Nebraska ===
In 1962, Osborne joined Nebraska's coaching staff as an unpaid assistant to head coach Bob Devaney; his only compensation was the ability to dine at the athletic training table. After disappointing 6–4 seasons in both 1967 and 1968, Devaney named Osborne offensive coordinator for the 1969 season. Osborne immediately overhauled the offense, switching to a balanced attack operated from the I formation. The revamped offense sparked the 1970 Cornhuskers to the first national title in program history. Nebraska defeated LSU 17–12 in the Orange Bowl on New Year's night and finished first in the post-bowl AP Poll. Nebraska won the national title again in 1971, becoming the first champion ever to defeat the next three teams in the final AP Poll (Oklahoma, Colorado, and Alabama).

Devaney stepped down as head coach after the 1972 season to concentrate on his duties as athletic director, and named Osborne his successor. Devaney's final game was a convincing win over Notre Dame in the Orange Bowl, Nebraska's third straight Orange Bowl victory. At age 35, Osborne took over as Nebraska's head coach, a position he would hold for 25 years until his retirement following the 1997 season.

In his quarter-century as head coach, Osborne was a model of consistency. His teams never won fewer than nine games in a season, only finished worse than third in conference or division play once, finished in the top 15 of the final AP poll 24 out of 25 years, and were ranked in the top 25 for 304 out of his 307 games as head coach–including every weekly poll from October 12, 1981, onward. Osborne's teams won outright national championships in 1994 and 1995, and a share of another in 1997. Osborne's Huskers also won or shared 13 conference championships (12 Big Eight, one Big 12). His 255–49–3 record gave him the best winning percentage (83.6%) among active coaches at the time of his retirement and the fifth-best of all time, and he won 250 games faster than any coach in Division I-A history. Osborne finished his coaching career with a bowl record of 12–13.

Osborne's teams were known for their powerful rushing attack and strong defense (also known as the Blackshirts—a reference to the black jerseys worn in practice by NU's defensive starters). Using Osborne's trademark I-form option, Nebraska led the nation in rushing several times in the 1980s and 1990s, due to the efforts of players like Jarvis Redwine, Heisman Trophy winner Mike Rozier, Calvin Jones, Ahman Green, and Lawrence Phillips. Osborne's offenses were initially balanced attacks, but after struggling against Oklahoma's wishbone option in the 1970s, he switched to a run-based option to better utilize the versatility of dual-threat quarterbacks such as Jeff Quinn, Turner Gill, Tommie Frazier, and Scott Frost.

One of the enduring moments of Osborne's tenure was the 1984 Orange Bowl. Nebraska entered the game 12–0 and had been ranked No. 1 the entire season. The Cornhuskers scored a late touchdown against No. 5 Miami to cut the Hurricanes' lead to 31–30, but rather than kick the extra point to tie (which would have won the national title for NU), Osborne opted to attempt the two-point conversion and go for the win. However, Gill's pass attempt was tipped away in the end zone, giving hometown Miami the victory and their first national championship.

Nebraska lost another heartbreaking title game in the 1994 Orange Bowl. Despite going into the game as a 17-point underdog, the Cornhuskers held a 16–15 lead on Florida State with less than two minutes remaining. After Florida State drove to retake the lead 18–16, Nebraska hit a quick downfield pass to get one last field goal attempt as time ran out, which sailed wide.

The next year, Osborne finally earned his first title as head coach, defeating Miami in the Orange Bowl. The Huskers trailed 10–0 after one quarter, but rallied to win 24–17. The next year, the Cornhuskers roared through the regular season, winning every game by at least 14 points and shattering offensive records. Nebraska defeated Florida 62–24 in the 1996 Fiesta Bowl to earn Osborne his second national championship. Many pundits consider NU's 1995 team the best college football team of all time.

Osborne announced his retirement late in the 1997 season, selecting longtime I-backs coach Frank Solich to succeed him. In his final game, Nebraska won the national championship with a 42–17 victory over Tennessee. In his final five seasons, Osborne's record was a staggering 60–3, which remains the strongest finale to any Division I coaching career.

=== Coaching tree ===
Osborne's Nebraska coaching staffs were renowned for their lack of turnover. Several assistants were known to have declined head coaching offers elsewhere to remain with the program. Notable examples include George Darlington (30 seasons), Milt Tenopir (29 seasons), and Charles McBride (23 seasons) all of whom had opportunities to become head coaches. Darlington was the first assistant coach in Division I-A history to be involved in 300 wins at one school. However, several assistant coaches and players under Osborne did go on to become NCAA head coaches:

- Craig Bohl: North Dakota State (2003–13), Wyoming (2014–2023)
- Scott Frost: UCF (2016–2017, 2025-present), Nebraska (2018–2022)
- Turner Gill: Buffalo (2006–09), Kansas (2010–11), Liberty (2012–18)
- Frank Solich: Nebraska (1998–2003), Ohio (2005–2020)
- Tony Samuel: New Mexico State (1997–2004), Southeast Missouri State (2006–13)
- Monte Kiffin: North Carolina State (1980–1982)
- Warren Powers: Washington State (1977), Missouri (1978–1984)

=== Head coaching record ===
Year	Team	Overall	Conference	Standing	Bowl/playoffs	Coaches^{#}	AP^{°}
Nebraska Cornhuskers (Big Eight Conference) (1973–1995)
1973	Nebraska	9–2–1	4–2–1	T–2nd	W Cotton	T–11	7
1974	Nebraska	9–3	5–2	T–2nd	W Sugar	9	8
1975	Nebraska	10–2	6–1	T–1st	L Fiesta	9	9
1976	Nebraska	9–3–1	4–3	T–4th	W Astro-Bluebonnet	7	9
1977	Nebraska	9–3	5–2	T–2nd	W Liberty	10	12
1978	Nebraska	9–3	6–1	T–1st	L Orange	8	8
1979	Nebraska	10–2	6–1	2nd	L Cotton	7	9
1980	Nebraska	10–2	6–1	2nd	W Sun	7	7
1981	Nebraska	9–3	7–0	1st	L Orange	9	11
1982	Nebraska	12–1	7–0	1st	W Orange	3	3
1983	Nebraska	12–1	7–0	1st	L Orange	2	2
1984	Nebraska	10–2	6–1	T–1st	W Sugar	3	4
1985	Nebraska	9–3	6–1	2nd	L Fiesta	10	11
1986	Nebraska	10–2	5–2	3rd	W Sugar	4	5
1987	Nebraska	10–2	6–1	2nd	L Fiesta	6	6
1988	Nebraska	11–2	7–0	1st	L Orange	10	10
1989	Nebraska	10–2	6–1	2nd	L Fiesta	12	11
1990	Nebraska	9–3	5–2	3rd	L Florida Citrus	T–17	24
1991	Nebraska	9–2–1	6–0–1	T–1st	L Orange	16	15
1992	Nebraska	9–3	6–1	1st	L Orange^{†}	14	14
1993	Nebraska	11–1	7–0	1st	L Orange^{†}	3	3
1994	Nebraska	13–0	7–0	1st	W Orange^{†}	1	1
1995	Nebraska	12–0	7–0	1st	W Fiesta^{†}	1	1
Nebraska Cornhuskers (Big 12 Conference) (1996–1997)
1996	Nebraska	11–2	8–0	1st (North)	W Orange^{†}	6	6
1997	Nebraska	13–0	8–0	1st (North)	W Orange^{†}	1	2
Nebraska:		255–49–3	153–22–2				
Total:		255–49–3					
National championship Conference title Conference division title or championship game berth
^{†}Indicates Bowl Coalition or Bowl Alliance bowl.; ^{#}Rankings from final Coaches Poll.; ^{°}Rankings from final AP Poll.

== Athletic director ==
From 1979 to 1998, Osborne was an assistant athletic director at Nebraska, under both Bob Devaney and Bill Byrne.

Osborne and the 1997 national championship team were the guests of honor at Nebraska's 2007 Homecoming game. Just two days after the resulting 45–14 loss to Oklahoma State – Nebraska's worst home loss since being shut out 31–0 by Missouri in 1958 – athletic director Steve Pederson was fired. On October 16, 2007, Osborne was named interim athletic director. On November 24, 2007, Osborne fired head coach Bill Callahan following a 5–7 season. Osborne appointed himself interim head coach so that he could perform recruiting duties while remaining in compliance with NCAA rules. He served in this capacity for less than a week before naming Bo Pelini head coach on December 2. In 2010, Osborne ended Nebraska's long-standing relationship with the Big 12 Conference and accepted an invitation for the school to become the twelfth member of the Big Ten.

On December 19, Nebraska removed the interim tag from Osborne's title and announced he would remain athletic director through June 30, 2010. Osborne was paid $250,000 per year to manage Nebraska's 23-sport program. Osborne later agreed to continue as athletic director after 2010, with his position to be reviewed annually. On September 26, 2012, Osborne announced his retirement, effective January 1 of the following year. Osborne officially resigned on January 2, 2013, after returning to Lincoln with the football team following their participation in the Capital One Bowl.

== Political career ==
=== House of Representatives ===
Early in 2000, Osborne announced that he would run in Nebraska's 3rd District as a Republican. He had grown up in Hastings, one of the larger cities in the sprawling district, and claimed a home in Lemoyne, near Ogallala, as his district residence. However, he hadn't lived regularly in the district since at least 1964; for most of that time he lived in Lincoln, the heart of the 1st District. Nonetheless, due to his wide popularity in the state, he easily won the Republican primary, which was tantamount to election in what has long been one of the most Republican districts in the nation. He breezed to victory in November with 83 percent of the vote. He was reelected with no major-party opposition in 2002 and against a Democrat in 2004.

In Congress, Osborne's voting record was moderate to conservative. He garnered a lifetime rating of 83 from the American Conservative Union.

At one point, Osborne teamed up with Nebraska State Senator Ernie Chambers, normally his political adversary, to oppose efforts to expand gambling in Nebraska.

Following Osborne's congressional service, President George W. Bush appointed him as a member of the Board of Directors of the Corporation for National and Community Service in 2007, but he resigned in 2008.

=== 2006 governor's race ===
In 2006, Osborne ran for Governor of Nebraska, challenging incumbent Dave Heineman and Omaha businessman Dave Nabity in the Republican primary.

Osborne was initially thought to be the favorite in the race, given his tremendous popularity in the state. However, Heineman took 49 percent of the more than 197,000 votes cast to Osborne's 45 percent.

The Lincoln Journal Star analyzed the race:

While Osborne captured populous Omaha and Lincoln, Heineman sealed his victory in rural counties and key population centers in western and central Nebraska's critical Republican battleground ... it was the political impact of two gubernatorial vetoes that appeared to lift [Heineman] into a late surge, especially in Osborne's congressional district.

Heineman's opposition to Class I rural school reorganization and the granting of resident college tuition rates to the children of illegal immigrants cut into Osborne's support. Osborne declined to sign referendum petitions seeking voter repeal of the rural school legislation and said he would have signed the resident tuition bill.

== Honors ==
In 1984, the section of U.S. Route 281 (overlapped with U.S. Route 34) between Hastings and Grand Island, a divided highway, was designated the Tom Osborne Expressway.

In 1995, Osborne received the Golden Plate Award of the American Academy of Achievement.

In 1998, Nebraska renamed the playing surface at Memorial Stadium Tom Osborne Field. The stadium nearly doubled in size during his three decades on NU's coaching staff, a reflection of Nebraska's increased national prominence in that time.

Osborne was inducted into the College Football Hall of Fame in 1999 and received the Jim Thorpe Lifetime Achievement Award in 2000. In 1999, ESPN named Osborne the "coach of the decade" for the 1990s. A 2007 poll named Osborne the "greatest college football coach of all time".

In 2013, the NAIA Football National Championship trophy was named the Tom Osborne Trophy. In 2018, Osborne was inducted into the National High School Hall of Fame.

== See also ==
- List of college football career coaching wins leaders
- Nebraska Cornhuskers football under Tom Osborne

U.S. House of Representatives
Preceded by Bill Barrett	Member of the U.S. House of Representatives from Nebraska's 3rd congressional district 2001–2007	Succeeded by Adrian Smith
U.S. order of precedence (ceremonial)
Preceded by Joe Heck as Former U.S. Representative	Order of precedence of the United States as Former U.S. Representative	Succeeded by Bob Schaffer as Former U.S. Representative
