= 1987 Sun Bowl =

American college football game

1987 John Hancock Sun Bowl
West Virginia Mountaineers	Oklahoma State Cowboys
(6–5)	(9–2)
Independent	Big Eight
33	35
Head coach: Don Nehlen	Head coach: Pat Jones
	AP / Coaches; 11 / 11
	1	2	3	4	Total
West Virginia	7	17	3	6	33
Oklahoma State	14	0	14	7	35
- Date: December 25, 1987
- Season: 1987
- Stadium: Sun Bowl
- Location: El Paso, Texas
- Referee: Pat Sweeney (WAC)

United States TV coverage
- Network: CBS
- Announcers: Brent Musburger and Pat Haden

The 1987 John Hancock Sun Bowl was the 54th annual Sun Bowl. The contest featured the West Virginia Mountaineers and the 11th-ranked Oklahoma State Cowboys. Oklahoma State edged out West Virginia, 35–33. The game was decided with 1:13 to play. The game was played on snowy, cold Christmas Day of 1987 before a crowd of 43,240 in front of a CBS national television audience.

The game featured West Virginia's exciting new quarterback Major Harris, who had defeated Browning Nagle in the offseason for the Mountaineers' starting quarterback position. Nagle later transferred to Louisville. It was also the final college game for Oklahoma State running back Thurman Thomas, who went on to a Pro Football Hall of Fame career in the National Football League (NFL). Oklahoma State also featured tailback Barry Sanders. Sanders won the Heisman Trophy the following season and also went on to a Pro Football Hall of Fame career.

== Game summary ==
The game featured a lot of offense, with teams trading touchdowns in the first quarter. Cowboys quarterback Mike Gundy and wide receiver Hart Lee Dykes completed a long pass off of a flea flicker to set up a 5-yard touchdown by Thomas. West Virginia's Anthony "A.B." Brown answered with a touchdown to tie the game at 7–7. Thomas scored again on a 9-yard run to take a 14–7 lead for Oklahoma State.

West Virginia, however, scored 17 unanswered points in the second quarter. West Virginia's Brown scored on a 5-yard run to tie the game at 14, and the Mountaineers extended their lead to 17–14 on a Charlie Baumann field goal. West Virginia defensive lineman Darnell Warren intercepted Mike Gundy to extend the Mountaineer lead to 24–14 at the end of the first half.

OSU reverted to Thomas to begin the second half, and he carried the ball six consecutive times, marching the Cowboys 56 yards down the field and scoring from 5 yards out to pull the Cowboys to within three at 24–21.

West Virginia answered with a Baumann field goal to extend the lead to 27–21. Oklahoma State took a 28–27 lead with 1:43 left in the third quarter, by virtue of a six-yard touchdown pass from Gundy to J. R. Dillard.

Thomas's dominance continued in the fourth quarter, as he capped a 13-play, 74-yard OSU drive with his fourth touchdown of the game, giving Oklahoma State a 35–27 lead with time running out in the fourth quarter.

With just 1:13 remaining, West Virginia's Craig Taylor scored a touchdown on a 6-yard run to pull the game to within two. West Virginia attempted to tie the game on a two-point conversion attempt. West Virginia quarterback Harris completed his two-point attempt pass to tight end Keith Winn, but Winn was tackled just shy of the goal line by Oklahoma State's Shawn Mackey.

With the win, Oklahoma State finished its season 10-2, lost only to no. 1 Oklahoma and no. 5 Nebraska. Thurman Thomas was named the C.M. Hendricks Most Valuable Player, while Sanders would go on to win the Heisman Trophy one year later. West Virginia's Darnell Warren was named the Jimmy Rogers Jr. Most Valuable Lineman.

Thomas still holds three Sun Bowl records: most rushing attempts (33), most points (24) and most touchdowns (4).

Initially, Sun Bowl officials granted the Ohio State Buckeyes an invitation to play Oklahoma State. The Buckeyes had beaten West Virginia in the season opener, and at 6–4–1 possessed a better record than the 6–5 Mountaineers. However, in the aftermath of the controversial firing of head coach Earle Bruce, Ohio State declined the invitation.

== Scoring summary ==
First quarter

OSU - Thomas 5 run (Blanchard kick): OSU 7, WVU 0

WVU - Brown 1 run (Baumann kick): OSU 7, WVU 7

OSU - Thomas 9 run (Blanchard kick): OSU 14, WVU 7

Second quarter

WVU - Brown 5 run (Baumann kick): OSU 14, WVU 14

WVU - FG Baumann 33: OSU 14, WVU 17

WVU - Warren 23 pass interception (Baumann kick): OSU 14, WVU 24

Third quarter

OSU - Thomas 4 run (Blanchard kick): OSU 21, WVU 24

WVU - FG Baumann 38: OSU 21, WVU 27

OSU - Dillard 6 pass from Gundy (Blanchard kick): OSU 28, WVU 27

Fourth quarter

OSU - Thomas 4 run (Blanchard kick): OSU 35, WVU 27

WVU - Taylor 6 run (Two-point conversion failed): OSU 35, WVU 33 (FINAL)

== Individual statistics ==
Rushing
OSU - Thomas 33-157, Sanders 6-19, Gundy 8-9
WVU - Brown 32-167, Harris 24-103, Taylor 12-58, Napoleon 2-3

Passing
OSU - Gundy 12-18-161
WVU - Harris 7-21-54

Receiving
OSU - Dykes 3-72, Thomas 3-20, Williams 1-19, Dillard 3-18, Keith 1-16, Green 1-16
WVU - Bell 1-45, Winn 1-9
