= 1987 Iowa State Cyclones football team =

American college football season

1987 Iowa State Cyclones football
- Conference: Big Eight Conference
- Record: 3–8 (2–5 Big 8)
- Head coach: Jim Walden (1st season)
- Defensive coordinator: Robin Ross (1st season)
- Home stadium: Cyclone Stadium

1987 Big Eight Conference football standings
	Conf.					Overall
Team	W		L		T	W		L		T
No. 3 Oklahoma $	7	–	0	–	0	11	–	1	–	0
No. 6 Nebraska	6	–	1	–	0	10	–	2	–	0
No. 11 Oklahoma State	5	–	2	–	0	10	–	2	–	0
Colorado	4	–	3	–	0	7	–	4	–	0
Missouri	3	–	4	–	0	5	–	6	–	0
Iowa State	2	–	5	–	0	3	–	8	–	0
Kansas	0	–	6	–	1	1	–	9	–	1
Kansas State	0	–	6	–	1	0	–	10	–	1
$ – Conference champion; Rankings from AP Poll

The 1987 Iowa State Cyclones football team represented Iowa State University as a member of the Big Eight Conference during the 1987 NCAA Division I-A football season. Led by first-year head coach Jim Walden, the Cyclones compiled an overall record of 3–8 with a mark of 2–5 in conference play, placing sixth in the Big 8. Iowa State played home games at Cyclone Stadium in Ames, Iowa.

Walden was previously the head football coach at Washington State University for nine seasons.

== Schedule ==
Date	Time	Opponent	Site	TV	Result	Attendance	Source
September 12	7:30 p.m.	at Tulane*	Louisiana Superdome; New Orleans, LA	WOI/KOIA (delay); Closed circuit in Iowa	L 12–25	27,561	
September 19	12:10 p.m.	Iowa*	Cyclone Stadium; Ames, IA (rivalry)	WOI/KCRG/KTIV/KIMT; KOIA/WQAD/KPTM	L 9–48	54,101	
September 26	2:00 p.m.	at Wyoming*	War Memorial Stadium; Laramie, WY	WOI/KOIA (delay)	L 17–34	18,386	
October 3	1:00 p.m.	No. 1 Oklahoma	Cyclone Stadium; Ames, IA	PPV/WOI (delay)	L 3–56	36,050	
October 10	1:00 p.m.	Northern Iowa*	Cyclone Stadium; Ames, IA	WOI (delay)	W 39–38	46,515	
October 17	1:00 p.m.	Missouri	Cyclone Stadium; Ames, IA (rivalry)	WOI (delay)	L 17–42	35,888	
October 24	1:00 p.m.	at Kansas	Memorial Stadium; Lawrence, KS	WOI/KOIA (delay)	W 42–28	28,300	
October 31	1:00 p.m.	Colorado^{†}	Cyclone Stadium; Ames, IA	WOI (day)	L 10–42	34,920	
November 7	1:30 p.m.	at No. 2 Nebraska	Memorial Stadium; Lincoln, NE (rivalry)	WOI (delay)	L 3–42	76,001	
November 14	1:30 p.m.	Kansas State	Cyclone Stadium; Ames, IA (rivalry)	WOI (delay)	W 16–14	33,516	
November 21	1:30 p.m.	at No. 13 Oklahoma State	Lewis Field; Stillwater, OK	WOI (delay)	L 27–48	33,400	
*Non-conference game; ^{†}Homecoming; Rankings from AP Poll released prior to the game; All times are in Central time

== Game summaries ==
=== Iowa ===
Iowa at Iowa State

Team	1	2	3	4	Total
• Hawkeyes	10	14	10	14	48
Cyclones	3	6	0	0	9

- Date: September 19
- Location: Jack Trice Stadium, Ames, Iowa
- Game attendance: 54,101

Scoring summary
1	ISU	Shudak 27-yard field goal	ISU 3-0
1	IOWA	Rob Houghtlin 30-yard field goal	Tied 3-3
1	IOWA	Harmon 11-yard run (Houghtlin kick)	IOWA 10-3
2	ISU	Shudak 47-yard field goal	IOWA 10-6
2	IOWA	Harmon 3-yard run (Houghtlin kick)	IOWA 17-6
2	IOWA	Harmon 3-yard run (Houghtlin kick)	IOWA 24-6
2	ISU	Shudak 34-yard field goal	IOWA 24-9
3	IOWA	Rob Houghtlin 55-yard field goal	IOWA 27-9
3	IOWA	Hudson 8-yard pass from Hartlieb (Houghtlin kick)	IOWA 34-9
4	IOWA	Stewart 1-yard run (Houghtlin kick)	IOWA 41-9
4	IOWA	Poholsky 3-yard run (Houghtlin kick)	IOWA 48-9

=== At Nebraska ===
Iowa State at Nebraska

Team	1	2	3	4	Total
Cyclones	0	0	3	0	3
• Cornhuskers	14	14	7	7	42

- Date: November 7
- Location: Memorial Stadium, Lincoln, Nebraska
- Game attendance: 76,001

== Roster ==
1987 Iowa State Cyclones football team roster
Players
Coaches
Offense

Pos.	#	Name	Class
G		Keith Sims	So

Defense

Pos.	#	Name	Class
DE	58	Scott Benson	Sr
DB	11	Marcus Robertson	Fr

Special teams

Pos.	#	Name	Class

Head coach

- Jim Walden

Coordinators/assistant coaches

Legend

- (C) Team captain
- (S) Suspended
- (I) Ineligible
- Injured
- Redshirt
