= 1987 Nebraska Cornhuskers football team =

American college football season

1987 Nebraska Cornhuskers football

Fiesta Bowl, L 28–31 vs. Florida State
- Conference: Big Eight Conference

Ranking
- Coaches: No. 6
- AP: No. 6
- Record: 10–2 (6–1 Big 8)
- Head coach: Tom Osborne (15th season)
- Offensive scheme: I formation
- Defensive coordinator: Charlie McBride (7th season)
- Base defense: 3–4
- Home stadium: Memorial Stadium

1987 Big Eight Conference football standings
	Conf.					Overall
Team	W		L		T	W		L		T
No. 3 Oklahoma $	7	–	0	–	0	11	–	1	–	0
No. 6 Nebraska	6	–	1	–	0	10	–	2	–	0
No. 11 Oklahoma State	5	–	2	–	0	10	–	2	–	0
Colorado	4	–	3	–	0	7	–	4	–	0
Missouri	3	–	4	–	0	5	–	6	–	0
Iowa State	2	–	5	–	0	3	–	8	–	0
Kansas	0	–	6	–	1	1	–	9	–	1
Kansas State	0	–	6	–	1	0	–	10	–	1
$ – Conference champion; Rankings from AP Poll

The 1987 Nebraska Cornhuskers football team represented the University of Nebraska–Lincoln in the 1987 NCAA Division I-A football season. The team was coached by Tom Osborne and played their home games in Memorial Stadium in Lincoln, Nebraska.

== Schedule ==
Date	Time	Opponent	Rank	Site	TV	Result	Attendance	Source
September 5	1:30 pm	Utah State*	No. 2	Memorial Stadium; Lincoln, NE		W 56–12	75,910	
September 12	4:00 pm	No. 3 UCLA*	No. 2	Memorial Stadium; Lincoln, NE	ESPN	W 42–33	76,313	
September 26	2:30 pm	at No. 12 Arizona State*	No. 2	Sun Devil Stadium; Tempe, AZ	ABC	W 35–28	71,264	
October 3	3:00 pm	South Carolina*	No. 2	Memorial Stadium; Lincoln, NE	ESPN	W 30–21	76,061	
October 10	1:30 pm	Kansas	No. 2	Memorial Stadium; Lincoln, NE (rivalry)		W 54–2	76,053	
October 17	1:30 pm	at No. 12 Oklahoma State	No. 2	Lewis Field; Stillwater, OK	CBS	W 35–0	50,440	
October 24	1:30 pm	Kansas State^{†}	No. 2	Memorial Stadium; Lincoln, NE (rivalry)		W 56–3	76,106	
October 31	1:30 pm	at Missouri	No. 2	Faurot Field; Columbia, Missouri (rivalry)		W 42–7	55,594	
November 7	1:30 pm	Iowa State	No. 2	Memorial Stadium; Lincoln, NE (rivalry)		W 42–3	76,001	
November 21	2:30 pm	No. 2 Oklahoma	No. 1	Memorial Stadium; Lincoln, NE (rivalry)	CBS	L 7–17	76,663	
November 28	3:00 pm	at Colorado	No. 5	Folsom Field; Boulder, CO (rivalry)	ESPN	W 24–7	52,026	
January 1, 1988	12:30 pm	vs. No. 3 Florida State*	No. 5	Sun Devil Stadium; Tempe, AZ (Fiesta Bowl)	NBC	L 28–31	72,112	
*Non-conference game; ^{†}Homecoming; Rankings from AP Poll released prior to the game; All times are in Central time

== Rankings ==
Ranking movements Legend: ██ Increase in ranking ██ Decrease in ranking
	Week															
Poll	Pre	1	2	3	4	5	6	7	8	9	10	11	12	13	14	Final
AP	2	2	2	2	2	2	2	2	2	2	2	1	5	5	5	6
Coaches																6

== Game summaries ==
=== Utah State ===
Utah State at Nebraska [box score]

Team	1	2	3	4	Total
Utah State	0	3	3	6	12
• Nebraska	7	21	21	7	56

- Date: 1987-09-05
- Location: Memorial Stadium, Lincoln, Nebraska
- Game attendance: 75,910

Nebraska QB Steve Taylor rushed for 157 yards, breaking a 35-year-old Cornhusker quarterback record, and Nebraska returned two punts for touchdowns, tying its own Big 8 record. Nebraska rolled over Utah State with 515 rushing yards while holding the Aggies to −1 yard.

=== UCLA ===
UCLA at Nebraska [box score]

Team	1	2	3	4	Total
UCLA	7	3	7	16	33
• Nebraska	0	14	14	14	42

- Date: 1987-09-12
- Location: Memorial Stadium, Lincoln, Nebraska
- Game attendance: 76,313

Memorial Stadium recorded its 150th consecutive sellout as #2 Nebraska defeated #3 UCLA. This was the first time two teams from the Top 3 had played in Lincoln. Nebraska QB Steve Taylor's five TD passes tied a Big 8 record set in 1938.

=== Arizona State ===
Nebraska at Arizona State [box score]

Team	1	2	3	4	Total
• Nebraska	0	14	7	14	35
Arizona State	0	6	15	7	28

- Date: 1987-09-26
- Location: Sun Devil Stadium, Tempe, Arizona
- Game attendance: 71,264

Following a late ASU game-tying score resulting from a fumble by Nebraska QB Steve Taylor, Nebraska IB Keith Jones tore off a 62-yard run with 3:37 remaining to set up the winning series as Nebraska triumphed over the #12 Sun Devils.

=== South Carolina ===
South Carolina at Nebraska [box score]

Team	1	2	3	4	Total
South Carolina	0	7	14	0	21
• Nebraska	3	10	0	17	30

- Date: 1987-10-03
- Location: Memorial Stadium, Lincoln, Nebraska
- Game attendance: 76,061

South Carolina was leading 21–13 in the 3rd as Nebraska QB Steve Taylor left the game with a shoulder injury. After that, Nebraska regained the momentum, holding the Gamecocks to just 9 yards total, recovering a fumble to set up a score, and adding a late interception and field goal to put up the win.

=== Kansas ===
Kansas at Nebraska [box score]

Team	1	2	3	4	Total
Kansas	0	0	0	2	2
• Nebraska	17	10	14	13	54

- Date: 1987-10-10
- Location: Memorial Stadium, Lincoln, Nebraska
- Game attendance: 76,053

Nebraska cruised against a weak Kansas team, as Nebraska QB Clete Blakeman filled in for injured starting QB Steve Taylor.

=== Oklahoma State ===
Nebraska at Oklahoma State [box score]

Team	1	2	3	4	Total
• Nebraska	7	14	7	7	35
Oklahoma State	0	0	0	0	0

- Date: 1987-10-17
- Location: Lewis Field, Stillwater, Oklahoma
- Game attendance: 54,440

Nebraska continued their 26-year winning streak against the Cowboys, putting a stop to #12 Oklahoma State's best start and best winning streak since 1945. Cowboys RB Thurman Thomas, at that time the NCAA rushing leader, was held to just 7 yards in 9 carries.

=== Kansas State ===
Kansas State Wildcats (0–6) at #2 Nebraska Cornhuskers (6–0)

Quarter	1	2	3	4	Total
Kansas St	0	3	0	0	3
Nebraska	21	14	14	7	56

at Memorial Stadium, Lincoln, Nebraska

- Date: October 24, 1987
- Game attendance: 76,106
- Box Score

Nebraska secured their 26th consecutive winning season, tying the NCAA record, and rolled up 459 rushing yards using 17 rushing players, while the Cornhusker defense prevented a touchdown for the third game in a row.

Team	Category	Player	Statistics
Kansas St	Passing	Gary Swim	12/29, 118 Yds, INT
Kansas St	Rushing	Lee Pickett	9 Rush, 44 Yds
Kansas St	Receiving	Kent Dean	5 Rec, 59 Yds
Nebraska	Passing	Clete Blakeman	9/10, 165 Yds, TD
Nebraska	Rushing	Tyreese Knox	8 Rush, 100 Yds, TD
Nebraska	Receiving	Todd Millikan	3 Rec, 46 Yds

Scoring summary

Quarter	Time	Drive			Team	Scoring information	Score	
Quarter	Time	Plays	Yards	TOP	Team	Scoring information	KSU	NU
1	13:18	3	66		Nebraska	Steve Taylor 49-yard touchdown run, Chris Drennan kick good	0	7
1	8:23	10	39		Nebraska	Tom Banderas 15-yard touchdown reception from Steve Taylor, Chris Drennan kick good	0	14
1	0:25	10	80		Nebraska	Richard Bell 46-yard touchdown run, Chris Drennan kick good	0	21
2	7:07	10	56		Nebraska	Clete Blakeman 1-yard touchdown run, Chris Drennan kick good	0	28
2	2:24	3	1		Kansas St	29-yard field goal by Mark Porter	3	28
2	0:00	7	88		Nebraska	Hendley Hawkins 40-yard touchdown reception from Clete Blakeman, Chris Drennan kick good	3	35
3	8:17	7	47		Nebraska	Micah Heibel 3-yard touchdown run, Chris Drennan kick good	3	42
3	0:41	10	83		Nebraska	Gerry Gdowski 10-yard touchdown run, Chris Drennan kick good	3	49
4	10:53	3	63		Nebraska	Tyreese Knox 50-yard touchdown run, Chris Drennan kick good	3	56
"TOP" = time of possession. For other American football terms, see Glossary of American football.							3	56

=== Missouri ===
Nebraska at Missouri [box score]

Team	1	2	3	4	Total
• Nebraska	7	21	7	7	42
Missouri	0	7	0	0	7

- Date: 1987-10-31
- Location: Faurot Field, Columbia, Missouri
- Game attendance: 55,594

The NCAA touchdown pass record from 1938 was tied by Nebraska for the second time in this season as the Cornhusker offense scored in all four quarters for the 4th game in a row, though the defense finally allowed their first touchdown in 15 quarters.

=== Iowa State ===
Iowa State at Nebraska [box score]

Team	1	2	3	4	Total
Iowa State	0	0	3	0	3
• Nebraska	14	14	7	7	42

- Date: 1987-11-07
- Location: Memorial Stadium, Lincoln, Nebraska
- Game attendance: 76,001

The Cornhuskers locked up their 19th consecutive 9-win season while piling up 666 total yards of offense as they rocketed to a 28–0 halftime lead before coasting to another win.

=== Oklahoma ===
#2 Oklahoma Sooners (10–0) at #1 Nebraska Cornhuskers (9–0)

Quarter	1	2	3	4	Total
Oklahoma	0	0	14	3	17
Nebraska	7	0	0	0	7

at Memorial Stadium • Lincoln, Nebraska

- Date: November 21
- Game weather: Sunny
- Game attendance: 76,663
- TV announcers (CBS): Brent Musburger and Pat Haden
- HuskerMax

Game information

Oklahoma

- Charles Thompson
  2/9, 25 Yds
- Patrick Collins
  13 Rush, 131 Yds, TD
- Keith Jackson
  1 Rec, 21 Yds

Nebraska

- Steve Taylorr
  6/18, 58 Yds, 3 INT
- Keith Jones
  15 Rush, 94 Yds, TD
- Richard Bell
  2 Rec, 18 Yds

Billed as "Game of the Century II", this first-ever #1 vs. #2 matchup in Memorial Stadium brought a halt to the Cornhuskers' title hopes. Nebraska had taken away Oklahoma's #1 ranking before this game, and gave it back as the Cornhuskers struggled to move the ball after their first and only score. The Sooners went on to win their 4th straight Big 8 Championship.

Scoring summary

Quarter	Time	Drive			Team	Scoring information	Score	
Quarter	Time	Plays	Yards	TOP	Team	Scoring information	OU	NEB
1	1:28		84		Nebraska	Jones 25-yard touchdown run, Drennan kick good	0	7
3	12:48	2	13		Oklahoma	Stafford 11-yard touchdown run, Lashar kick good	7	7
3	1:39				Oklahoma	Collins 65-yard touchdown run, Lashar kick good	14	7
4	7:40				Oklahoma	27-yard field goal by Lashar	17	7
"TOP" = time of possession. For other American football terms, see Glossary of American football.							17	7

=== Colorado ===
Nebraska at Colorado [box score]

Team	1	2	3	4	Total
• Nebraska	0	10	7	7	24
Colorado	0	0	7	0	7

- Date: 1987-11-28
- Location: Folsom Field, Boulder, Colorado
- Game attendance: 52,026

Scoring summary
2	13:54	NEB	Steve Taylor 5-yard run (Chris Drennan kick)	NEB 7–0
2	3:41	NEB	Chris Drennan 50-yard field goal	NEB 10–0
3	11:54	NEB	Keith Jones 50-yard run (Chris Drennan kick)	NEB 17–0
3	4:57	COL	George Hemingway 4-yard pass from Mark Hatcher (David DeLine kick)	NEB 17–7
4	9:34	NEB	Keith Jones 44-yard run (Chris Drennan kick)	NEB 24–7

Nebraska recovered from the Oklahoma loss and obtained their revenge for last year's loss to Colorado by taking out their frustrations on the Buffaloes in Boulder. Nebraska IB Keith Jones' 248 yards lifted him into a career 3rd-place ranking among Cornhusker runners.

=== Florida State ===
Florida State vs Nebraska [box score]

Team	1	2	3	4	Total
• Florida State	0	21	3	7	31
Nebraska	14	0	14	0	28

- Date: 1988-01-01
- Location: Sun Devil Stadium, Tempe, Arizona
- Game attendance: 72,112

Nebraska lost after leading by 4 midway through the 4th. A Seminole defender stripped the ball from Nebraska IB Tyreese Knox as he ran in from the FSU 2, which set up a 97-yard FSU march for the winning touchdown with 3:07 left to play.

== Personnel ==
=== Roster ===
1987 Nebraska Cornhuskers football team roster
Players
Coaches
Offense

Pos.	#	Name	Class
C	59	Jeff Anderson	So
C	53	Mark Antonietti	Jr
G	58	R.G. Arneson	So
SE	81	Chip Bahe	So
TE	87	Tom Banderas	Sr
WB	18	Vance Behrens	Sr
WB	21	Richard Bell	So
QB	12	Clete Blakeman	Sr
OT	69	Bill Bobbora	So
WB	33	Dana Brinson	Jr
FB	29	Bryan Carpenter	Jr
IB	32	Ken Clark	So
IB	1	Ray Coleman	Jr
FB	45	Doug Dalton	Sr
QB	14	Jerry Dunlap	So
OT	77	Jim Ernest	Jr
C	52	Roger Fitzke	So
QB	4	Gerry Gdowski	So
OT	75	Doug Glaser	So
OT	73	Derrick Green	Sr
SE	19	Morgan Gregory	So
G	66	Mike Griffin	So
WB	82	Hendley Hawkins	Sr
FB	48	Micah Heibel	Sr
WB	27	Jim Holscher	Sr
OT	70	Corey Bill Hudson	Sr
IB	6	Keith Jones	Sr
G	65	Andy Keeler	Jr
IB	40	Jon Kelley	Sr
FB	36	Kitrell Barry	Sr
IB	34	Tyreese Knox	Jr
TE	85	Monte Kratzenstein	So
FB	41	Tom Lenneman	Sr
OT	57	Keven Lightner	Sr
G	61	John McCormick	Sr
SE	83	Tim McCoy	So
TE	43	Todd Millikan	Jr
G	76	John Nelson	Jr
TE	86	Keith Neubert	Sr
C	63	John Nichols	Sr
G	54	Chris O'Gara	So
IB	20	Terry Rodgers	So
G	64	John Roschal	So
FB	25	Sam Schmidt	So
WB	2	Von Sheppard	Sr
OT	62	Bob Sledge	Jr
SE	88	Rod Smith	Sr
G	67	John Strasheim
QB	9	Steve Taylor	Jr
WB	31	Jamie Worden	Jr
C	68	Jake Young	So

Defense

Pos.	#	Name	Class
S	23	Mark Blazek	Jr
OLB	81	Kurt Broer	Jr
DT	95	Paul Brungardt	Fr
LB	49	Chris Caliendo	So
CB	7	McCathorn Clayton	Sr
SS	17	Reggie Cooper	Fr
CB	16	Jon Crippen	Fr
OLB	88	Mike Croel	Fr
CB	28	John Custard	Jr
LB	47	LeRoy Etienne	Jr
LB	51	Brad Ferguson	So
LB	38	Steve Forch	Sr
CB	10	Charles Fryar	Jr
DT	84	Willie Griffin	Jr
LB	36	Bob Hansen	So
CB	8	Lorenzo Hicks	Jr
S	4	Tim Jackson	Jr
DE	80	Jeff Jamrog	Sr
LB	55	Randall Jobman	So
DT	98	Lee Jones	Sr
CB	35	Tahaun Lewis	Fr
DT	94	Jeff Long	So
DE	93	Jon Marco	Jr
S	2	Dan McArdle	So
CB	3	Kurt McCallum	So
DE	42	Jeff Mills	So
MG	74	Mike Murray	So
DE	90	Harlan Opie	Sr
DT	97	Tony Palmer	Sr
MG	96	Lawrence Pete	Jr
MG	92	Sean Putnam	Jr
S	18	John Richman	So
DT	72	Brad Rother	So
DT	78	Tim Rother	Sr
S	26	Marvin Sanders	So
DT	66	Kurt Skradis	Jr
DT	99	Neil Smith	Sr
DE	56	Steve Stanard	Jr
DE	89	Broderick Thomas	Jr
S	11	Jeff Tomjack	Sr
DT	75	Ray Valladao	So
S	41	Scott Vampola	So
CB	27	Cartier Walker	Jr
DE	83	Kenny Walker	So
S	5	Brian Washington	Sr
MG	91	Kent Wells	So
LB	37	Doug Welniak	Sr
S	1	Rick Wendland	So
LB	24	Dante Wiley	Jr
S	15	Wendell Wooten	Jr

Special teams

Pos.	#	Name	Class
PK	44	Gregg Barrios	So
PK	39	Dave Cheloha	Jr
PK	16	Chris Drennan	So
P	46	John Kroeker	Jr
P/PK	13	Craig Schnitzler	Sr

Head coach

- Tom Osborne
  15th season
  24th year at Nebraska
  Alma mater: Nebraska

Coordinators/assistant coaches

- Charlie McBride
  7th season as DC/DL coach
  11th year at Nebraska
  Alma mater: Colorado
- Ron Brown
  1st season as WR/TE coach
  1st year at Nebraska
  Alma mater: Brown
- Dan Young
  5th season as OL/K coach
  5th year at Nebraska
  Alma mater: Reed
- Milt Tenopir
  14th season as OL coach
  14th year at Nebraska
  Alma mater: Sterling
- Tony Samuel
  2nd season as OLB coach
  2nd year at Nebraska
  Alma mater: Nebraska
- George Darlington
  DB coach
  15th year at Nebraska
  Alma mater: Rutgers
- Frank Solich
  5th season as RB coach
  9th year at Nebraska
  Alma mater: Nebraska
- Boyd Epley
  19th season as S&C coach
  19th year at Nebraska
  Alma mater: Nebraska
- Jack Pierce
  9th year at Nebraska
- John Melton
  15th season as LB coach
  26th year at Nebraska
  Alma mater: Wyoming

Legend

- (C) Team captain
- (S) Suspended
- (I) Ineligible
- Injured
- Redshirt

Roster
Last update: 2011-01-17

=== Depth chart ===
Defense

FS
Mark Blazek
Tim Jackson
Wendell Wooten

OUTSIDE	INSDIE	INSDIE	OUTSIDE
Jeff Jamrog	Leroy Etienne	Steve Forch	Broderick Thomas
Jon Marco	Randall Jobmon	Doug Welniak	Mike Croel
Jeff Mills	Brad Ferguson	Chris Caliendo	Harlan Opie

SS
Brian Washington
Reggie Cooper
Jeff Tomjack

CB
Charles Fryar
Tahaun Lewis
Marvin Sanders

DE	NT	DE
Tim Rother	Lawrence Pete	Neil Smith
Lee Jones	Mike Murray	Ray Valladao
Brad Rother	Kent Wells	Willie Griffin

CB
Lorenzo Hicks
McCathorn Clayton
Cartier Walker
Jon Custard

Offense

SE
Rod Smith
Hendley Hawkins
Morgan Gregory

LT	LG	C	RG	RT
Bob Sledge	Andy Keeler	Jake Young	John McCormick	Kevin Lightner
Derrick Green	John Nelson	John Nichols	John Roschal	Doug Glaser
Corey B Hudson	Mark Antonietti	Jeff Anderson	John Strasheim	Bill Bobbora

TE
Todd Millikan
Tom Banderas
Keith Neubert

WB
Dana Brinson
Richard Bell
Von Sheppard

QB
Steve Taylor
Clete Blakeman
Gerry Gdowski

RB
Keith Jones
Tyreese Knox
Ken Clark
Jon Kelley

FB
Micah Heibel
Bryan Carpenter
Sam Schmidt

Special teams
PK Chris Drennan
P John Kroeker

== Awards ==
Award	Name(s)
All-America 1st team	John McCormick, Neil Smith, Steve Taylor, Broderick Thomas
All-Big 8 1st team	LeRoy Etienne, Steve Forch, Keith Jones, Kevin Lightner, John McCormick, Tim Rother, Neil Smith, Steve Taylor, Broderick Thomas
All-Big 8 2nd team	Tom Banderas, Charles Fryar, Bob Sledge, Rod Smith, Jake Young
All-Big 8 honorable mention	Mark Blazek, Lee Jones

== NFL and pro players ==
The following Nebraska players who participated in the 1987 season later moved on to the next level and joined a professional or semi-pro team as draftees or free agents.

Name	Team
Richard Bell	Pittsburgh Steelers
Dana Brinson	San Diego Chargers
Ken Clark	Indianapolis Colts
Reggie Cooper	Dallas Cowboys
Mike Croel	Denver Broncos
LeRoy Etienne	San Francisco 49ers
Tim Jackson	Dallas Cowboys
Keith Jones	Cleveland Browns
Jeff Mills	San Diego Chargers
Keith Neubert	New York Jets
John Nichols	Salzburg Lions
Lawrence Pete	Detroit Lions
Tim Rother	Los Angeles Raiders
Von Sheppard	Coventry Jets
Neil Smith	Kansas City Chiefs
Steve Taylor	Edmonton Eskimos
Broderick Thomas	Tampa Bay Buccaneers
Kenny Walker	Denver Broncos
Brian Washington	Cleveland Browns
Kent Wells	New York Giants
