= 1990 Fiesta Bowl =

1990 Sunkist Fiesta Bowl
- 19th Fiesta Bowl
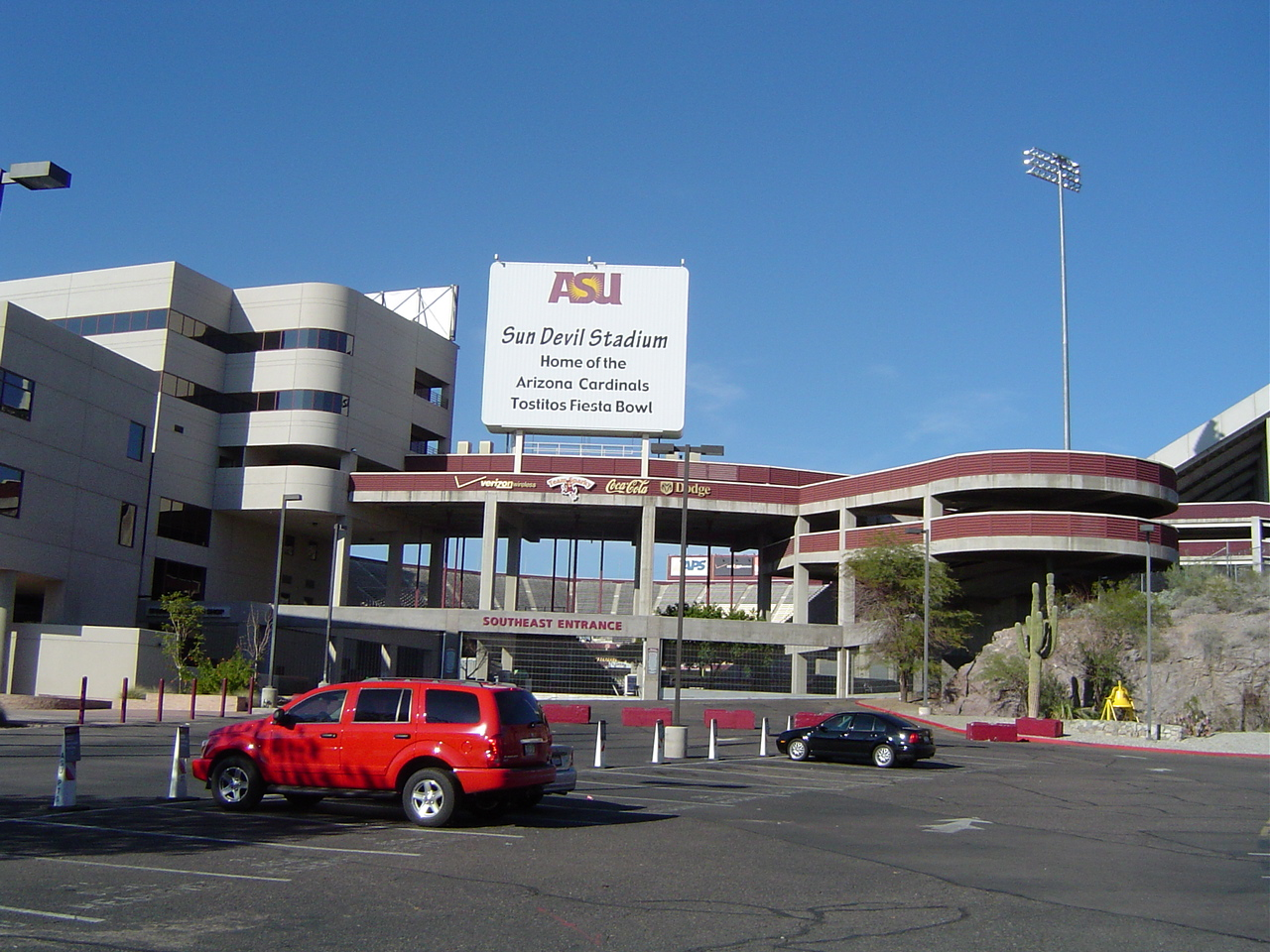
- Sun Devil Stadium in Tempe, Arizona, hosted the Fiesta Bowl.
Nebraska Cornhuskers	Florida State Seminoles
(10–1)	(9–2)
Big 8	Independent
17	41
Head coach: Tom Osborne	Head coach: Bobby Bowden
AP / Coaches; 6 / 6	AP / Coaches; 5 / 5
	1	2	3	4	Total
Nebraska	7	3	0	7	17
Florida State	0	21	20	0	41
- Date: January 1, 1990
- Season: 1989
- Stadium: Sun Devil Stadium
- Location: Tempe, Arizona
- MVP: Peter Tom Willis (QB, FSU); Odell Haggins (NG, FSU)
- Favorite: Florida State by 3½ points
- Referee: Jimmy Harper (SEC)
- Attendance: 73,953

United States TV coverage
- Network: NBC
- Announcers: Charlie Jones, Merlin Olsen
- Nielsen ratings: 7.9

The 1990 Sunkist Fiesta Bowl was the 19th edition of the Fiesta Bowl, played on January 1, in Tempe, Arizona. The game featured the sixth-ranked Nebraska Cornhuskers of the Big Eight Conference and the independent fifth-ranked Florida State Seminoles.

== Game summary ==
Less than four minutes into the game, Nebraska quarterback Gerry Gdowski threw a 9-yard touchdown pass to Morgan Gregory for the only score of the first quarter. Florida State got on the scoreboard with a 14-yard touchdown pass from quarterback Peter Tom Willis to wide receiver Terry Anthony, tying the game at seven early in the second quarter. Chris Drennan responded with a 39-yard field goal to put Nebraska ahead 10–7 with over twelve minutes left in the half.

Willis connected with wide receiver Reggie Johnson for a 5-yard touchdown pass and a 14–10 Seminole lead. He later connected with Dexter Carter for a 10-yard touchdown pass with 24 seconds left in the half, as the Seminoles took a 21–10 lead into the locker room.

With six minutes left in the third quarter, Paul Moore scored for Florida State on a 1-yard touchdown run, but the extra point attempt was blocked and the score was 27–10. With 3:37 left in the quarter, Willis threw his fourth touchdown pass of the game, an 8-yard strike to Johnson, widening the gap to 34–10. With two seconds left in the quarter, Willis threw a 24-yard touchdown pass to Terry Anthony for a 41–10 lead. In the second and third quarters, Florida State outscored Nebraska 41–3. Nebraska scored the only points of the fourth quarter on a touchdown run by quarterback Mickey Joseph with 1:16 remaining. It was the Huskers' worst defeat in a bowl game in 23 years.

Florida State climbed to third in the final AP poll, while Nebraska dropped to eleventh.

It was the fourth loss in as many appearances at the Fiesta Bowl for the Huskers; they won their next two in 1996 and 2000.

== Scoring ==
First quarter

- Nebraska – Morgan Gregory 9 pass from Gerry Gdowski (Gregg Barrios kick), 11:19

Second quarter

- Florida State – Terry Anthony 14 pass from Peter Tom Willis (Richie Andrews kick), 13:42
- Nebraska – Field goal, Chris Drennan 39, 12:15
- Florida State – Reggie Johnson 5 pass from Willis (Andrews kick), 6:55
- Florida State – Dexter Carter 10 pass from Willis (Andrews kick), 0:24

Third quarter

- Florida State – Paul Moore 1 run (kick blocked), 5:59
- Florida State – Johnson 8 pass from Willis (Andrews kick), 3:37
- Florida State – Anthony 24 pass from Willis (Andrews kick), 0:02

Fourth quarter

- Nebraska – Mickey Joseph 2 run (Drennan kick), 1:16

== Statistics ==
Statistics	Nebraska	Florida State
First downs	18	18
Rushes–yards	46–115	24–72
Passing yards	207	422
Passes	15–26–2	25–41–0
Total yards	322	494
Punts–average	3–34	3–36
Fumbles–lost	5–3	0–0
Turnovers by	5	0
Penalties-yards	6–48	13–135
Time of possession	32:30	27:30
