= 1977 Liberty Bowl =

American college football game

- 19th Liberty Bowl
Nebraska Cornhuskers	North Carolina Tar Heels
(8–3)	(8–2–1)
Big Eight	ACC
21	17
Head coach: Tom Osborne	Head coach: Bill Dooley
AP / Coaches; 12 / 13	AP / Coaches; 14 / 11
	1	2	3	4	Total
Nebraska	0	7	0	14	21
North Carolina	0	14	3	0	17
- Date: December 19, 1977
- Season: 1977
- Stadium: Liberty Bowl Memorial Stadium
- Location: Memphis, Tennessee
- MVP: Matt Kupec (QB, North Carolina)
- Favorite: Nebraska by 6
- Referee: James Malone (WAC)
- Attendance: 49,456

United States TV coverage
- Network: ABC
- Announcers: Keith Jackson, Frank Broyles

The 1977 Liberty Bowl was a college football postseason bowl game played in Memphis, Tennessee, on December 19, 1977. In the 19th edition of the Liberty Bowl, the Nebraska Cornhuskers of the Big Eight Conference rallied to defeat the North Carolina Tar Heels of the Atlantic Coast Conference, 21–17.

== Game summary ==
North Carolina led by ten points after three quarters, but was outscored, 14–0, in the fourth quarter as Randy Garcia came off the Husker bench and completed all three of his passes, two for touchdowns. It was the eighth bowl victory in nine seasons for Nebraska; they remained at twelfth in the final AP poll, and North Carolina slipped to seventeenth.

=== Scoring ===
First quarter

No scoring

Second quarter

- North Carolina – Brooks Williams 12 pass from Matt Kupec (Tom Biddle kick), 13:52
- Nebraska – Dodie Donnell 15 run (Billy Todd kick), 11:00
- North Carolina – Bob Loomis 10 pass from Kupec (Biddle kick), 3:11

Third quarter

- North Carolina – FG Biddle 47, 4:17

Fourth quarter

- Nebraska – Curtis Craig 10 pass from Randy Garcia (Todd kick), 10:51
- Nebraska – Tim Smith 34 pass from Garcia (Todd kick), 3:16

=== Statistics ===
Statistics	Nebraska	North Carolina
First downs	21	17
Rushes–yards	52–206	55–169
Passing yards	161	93
Passes	14–17–0	8–13–1
Total yards	367	262
Punts–average	3–37	3–43
Fumbles–lost	4–2	3–2
Turnovers by	2	3
Penalties–yards	2–10	5–35
