= 1988 Fiesta Bowl =

1988 Sunkist Fiesta Bowl
- 17th Fiesta Bowl
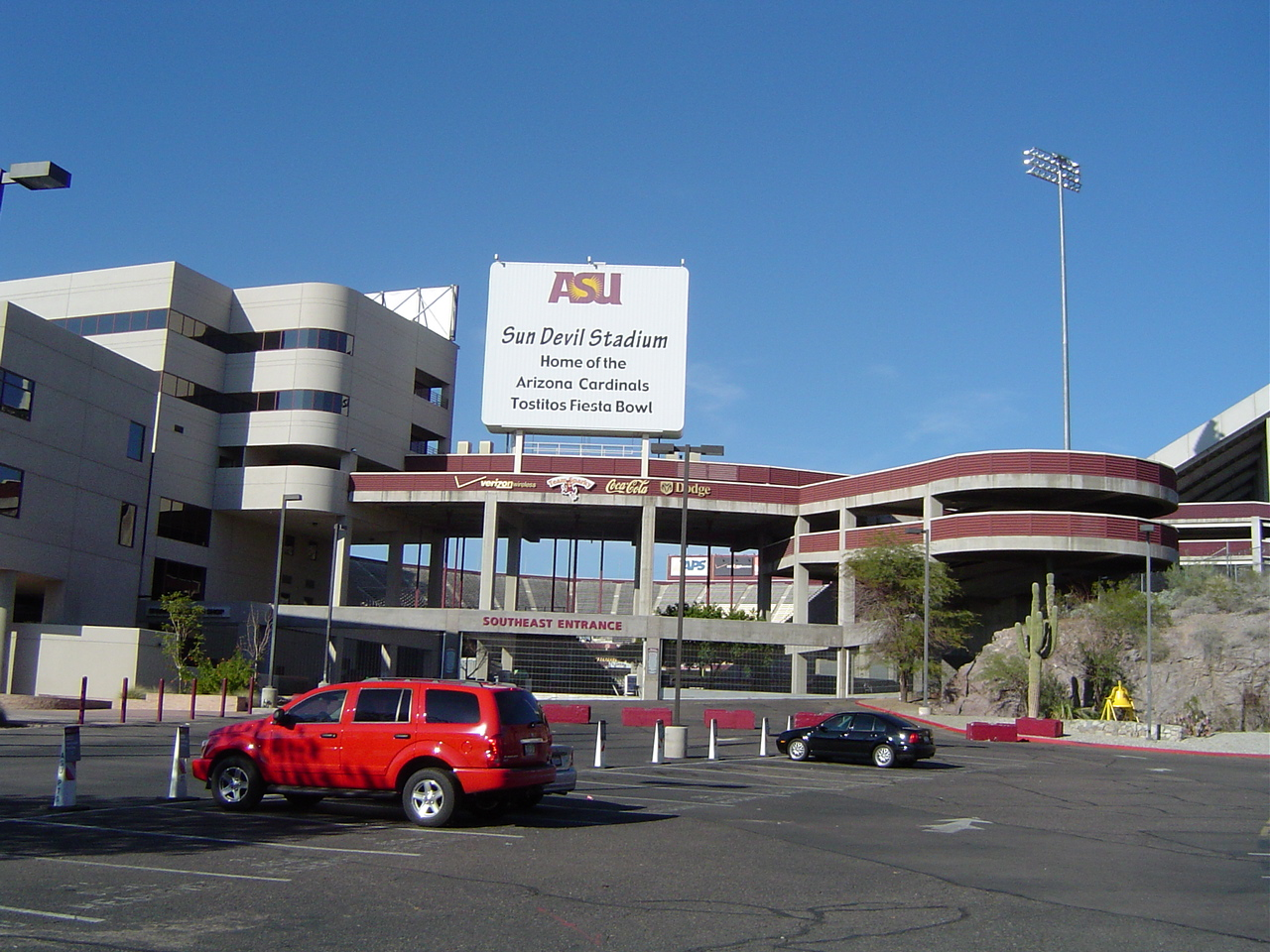
- Sun Devil Stadium in Tempe, Arizona, hosted the Fiesta Bowl.
Florida State Seminoles	Nebraska Cornhuskers
(10–1)	(10–1)
Independent	Big 8
31	28
Head coach: Bobby Bowden	Head coach: Tom Osborne
AP / Coaches; 3 / 3	AP / Coaches; 5 / 5
	1	2	3	4	Total
Florida State	0	21	3	7	31
Nebraska	14	0	14	0	28
- Date: January 1, 1988
- Season: 1987
- Stadium: Sun Devil Stadium
- Location: Tempe, Arizona
- MVP: Danny McManus (FSU QB); Neil Smith (NU DL)
- Favorite: Florida State by 3½ points
- Referee: Wendell Shelton (SWC)
- Attendance: 72,112

United States TV coverage
- Network: NBC
- Announcers: Charlie Jones, Jimmy Cefalo
- Nielsen ratings: 7.9

The 1988 Sunkist Fiesta Bowl was the 17th edition of the college football bowl game played at Sun Devil Stadium in Tempe, Arizona on Friday, January 1. Part of the 1987–88 bowl game season, it matched the third-ranked independent Florida State Seminoles and the #5 Nebraska Cornhuskers of the Big Eight Conference. Favored Florida State rallied to win 31–28.

== Game summary ==
Kickoff was just after 11:30 a.m. MST, and underdog Nebraska scored first on a three-yard run by senior halfback Keith Jones with 9:31 left in the first quarter. With 1:15 left in the opening stanza, Dana Brinson fielded a punt and returned it 52 yards for a touchdown and Nebraska led 14–0.

Florida State got on the board in the second quarter when quarterback Danny McManus threw a 10-yard touchdown pass to Herb Gainer. With under five minutes left in the first half, running back Dayne Williams scored from four yards out to tie the game at fourteen. With 44 seconds left in the half, McManus connected with Gainer on a 25-yard touchdown pass, marking their second hook-up of the game, and the Seminoles took a 21–14 advantage into halftime.

Just over three minutes into the third quarter, Nebraska quarterback Steve Taylor notched the equalizer, rumbling in from two yards out to tie the game at 21. Florida State settled for a field goal for a 24–21 lead. With forty seconds left in the quarter, running back Tyreese Knox scored on a four-yard run, giving Nebraska a 28–24 lead.

In the fourth quarter, Nebraska got the ball back on its 26-yard line. Following a methodical drive, they managed to move all the way to the FSU two-yard line for a first and goal. Knox took the handoff, looking for a sure touchdown, when a defender forced a fumble at the goal line, recovered by Florida State. Ten plays later, Florida State had advanced to the Nebraska 15 and McManus threw a touchdown pass on 4th and goal to Ronald Lewis for the clinching 31–28 score.

=== Scoring ===
First quarter

- Nebraska – Keith Jones 3-yard run (Chris Drennan kick), 9:31
- Nebraska – Dana Brinson 52-yard punt return (Drennan kick), 1:15

Second quarter

- Florida State – Herb Gainer 10-yard pass from Danny McManus (Derek Schmidt kick), 10:53
- Florida State – Dayne Williams 4-yard run (Schmidt kick), 3:48
- Florida State – Gainer 25-yard pass from McManus (Schmidt kick), 0:46

Third quarter

- Nebraska – Steve Taylor 2-yard run (Drennan kick), 11:41
- Florida State – Schmidt 32-yard field goal, 7:49
- Nebraska – Tyreese Knox 4-yard run (Drennan kick), 0:40

Fourth quarter

- Florida State – Ronald Lewis 15-yard pass from McManus (Schmidt kick), 3:07

== Statistics ==
Statistics	Florida State	Nebraska
First downs	26	20
Rushes–yards	29–82	54–242
Passing yards	375	142
Passes	28–51–1	7–14–1
Total yards	457	384
Punts–average	4–30	4–36
Fumbles–lost	2–1	4–2
Turnovers by	2	3
Penalties-yards	2–20	9–78
Time of possession	31:07	28:53

== Aftermath ==
Florida State climbed to second in the final AP poll and Nebraska fell to sixth.
