= Wright Anderson =

American football player and coach (born 1947)

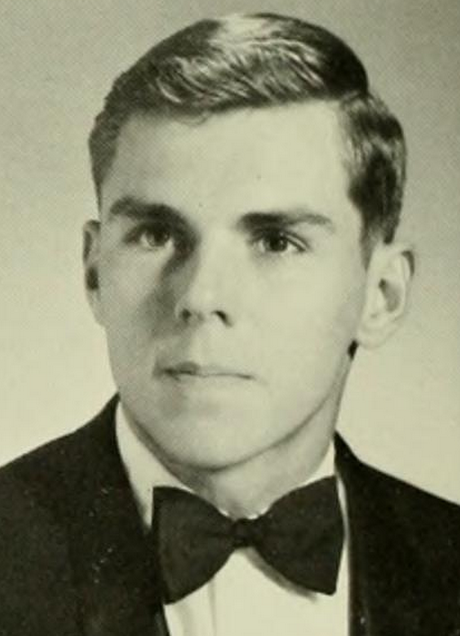
- Anderson pictured in Phi Psi Cli 1968, Elon yearbook

Biographical details
- Born: April 14, 1947 (age 79); Burgaw, North Carolina, U.S.
- Education: Elon University (1968)

Playing career
- c. 1967: Elon
- Positions: Tailback, defensive back

Coaching career (HC unless noted)
- 1970–1972: Wake Forest (assistant)
- 1973: Wichita State (assistant)
- 1974–1976: East Carolina (assistant)
- 1977–1979: Illinois (assistant)
- 1980–1981: East Carolina (assistant)
- 1982–1983: Elon
- 1984: Oklahoma Outlaws (WR/ST)
- 1985–1986: Missouri (QB)
- 1987–1988: Missouri (OC)

Head coaching record
- Overall: 14–6

Wright Lafate Anderson (born April 14, 1947) is an American former football coach. He served as the head football coach at Elon University from 1982 to 1983, compiling a record of 14–6.

In 1984, Anderson left Elon to accept a post as an assistant coach for the Oklahoma Outlaws of the United States Football League (USFL).

== Head coaching record ==
Year	Team	Overall	Conference	Standing	Bowl/playoffs
Elon Fightin' Christians (South Atlantic Conference) (1982–1983)
1982	Elon	7–3	5–2	T–2nd	
1983	Elon	7–3	4–3	T–3rd	
Elon:		14–6	9–5		
Total:		14–6			
