= 2024 Illinois Fighting Illini football team =

American college football season

2024 Illinois Fighting Illini football

Citrus Bowl champion

Citrus Bowl, W 21–17 vs. South Carolina
- Conference: Big Ten Conference

Ranking
- Coaches: No. 16
- AP: No. 16
- Record: 10–3 (6–3 Big Ten)
- Head coach: Bret Bielema (4th season)
- Offensive coordinator: Barry Lunney Jr. (3rd season)
- Offensive scheme: Spread
- Defensive coordinator: Aaron Henry (2nd season)
- Co-defensive coordinator: Terrance Jamison (2nd season)
- Base defense: Multiple 3–4
- Home stadium: Memorial Stadium

2024 Big Ten Conference football standings
	Conf.			Overall
Team	W		L	W		L
No. 3 Oregon y$^	9	–	0	13	–	1
No. 10 Indiana ^	8	–	1	11	–	2
No. 5 Penn State y^	8	–	1	13	–	3
No. 1 Ohio State #^	7	–	2	14	–	2
No. 16 Illinois	6	–	3	10	–	3
Iowa	6	–	3	8	–	5
Michigan	5	–	4	8	–	5
Minnesota	5	–	4	8	–	5
USC	4	–	5	7	–	6
Rutgers	4	–	5	7	–	6
Washington	4	–	5	6	–	7
Nebraska	3	–	6	7	–	6
UCLA	3	–	6	5	–	7
Wisconsin	3	–	6	5	–	7
Northwestern	2	–	7	4	–	8
Maryland	1	–	8	4	–	8
Michigan State†	0	–	6	0	–	7
Purdue	0	–	9	1	–	11
Championship: Oregon 45, Penn State 37
# – College Football Playoff champion; ^ – College Football Playoff participant; $ – Conference champion; y – Championship game participant; † — NCAA vacated all wins for Michigan State (5–7, 3–6); Rankings from AP Poll

The 2024 Illinois Fighting Illini football team was an American football team that represented the University of Illinois Urbana-Champaign as a member of the Big Ten Conference during the 2024 NCAA Division I FBS football season. In their fourth season under head coach Bret Bielema, the Fighting Illini compiled a 10–3 record (6–3 in conference games), tied for fifth place in the Big Ten, and outscored opponents by a total of 368 to 282. They concluded the season with a 21–17 victory over South Carolina in the Citrus Bowl. With their first ten-win season since 2001, the Illini were ranked No. 16 in the final AP and coaches polls.

The team's statistical leaders included quarterback Luke Altmyer (2,717 passing yards), running back Josh McCray (609 rushing yards), wide receiver Pat Bryant (510 receiving yards), kicker David Olano (89 points scored, 38 of 39 extra points, 17 of 20 field goals), and defensive back Matthew Bailey (94 total tackles, 44 solo tackles). Defensive back Xavier Scott had four interceptions and won first-team honors from the media on the 2024 All-Big Ten Conference football team.

The team played its home games at Memorial Stadium in Champaign, Illinois.

== Schedule ==
Date	Time	Opponent	Rank	Site	TV	Result	Attendance
August 29	8:00 p.m.	Eastern Illinois*		Memorial Stadium; Champaign, IL	BTN	W 45–0	43,849
September 7	6:00 p.m.	No. 19 Kansas*		Memorial Stadium; Champaign, IL	FS1	W 23–17	60,670
September 14	11:00 a.m.	Central Michigan*^{†}		Memorial Stadium; Champaign, IL	Peacock	W 30–9	51,498
September 20	7:00 p.m.	at No. 22 Nebraska	No. 24	Memorial Stadium; Lincoln, NE	FOX	W 31–24 ^{OT}	86,936
September 28	6:30 p.m.	at No. 9 Penn State	No. 19	Beaver Stadium; University Park, PA	NBC	L 7–21	109,911
October 12	2:30 p.m.	Purdue	No. 23	Memorial Stadium; Champaign, IL (rivalry)	FS1	W 50–49 ^{OT}	55,815
October 19	2:30 p.m.	No. 24 Michigan	No. 22	Memorial Stadium; Champaign, IL (rivalry)	CBS	W 21–7	60,670
October 26	2:30 p.m.	at No. 1 Oregon	No. 20	Autzen Stadium; Eugene, OR	CBS	L 9–38	59,830
November 2	11:00 a.m.	Minnesota	No. 24	Memorial Stadium; Champaign, IL	FS1	L 17–25	58,088
November 16	1:30 p.m.	Michigan State		Memorial Stadium; Champaign, IL	FS1	W 38–16	52,660
November 23	11:00 a.m.	at Rutgers	No. 25	SHI Stadium; Piscataway, NJ	Peacock	W 38–31	47,524
November 30	11:00 a.m.	vs. Northwestern	No. 23	Wrigley Field; Chicago, IL (rivalry)	BTN	W 38–28	26,378
December 31	2:00 p.m.	vs. No. 15 South Carolina	No. 20	Camping World Stadium; Orlando, FL (Citrus Bowl)	ABC	W 21–17	47,129
*Non-conference game; ^{†}Homecoming; Rankings from AP Poll (and CFP Rankings, after November 5) – Released prior to game; All times are in Central time; Source:

== Rankings ==
Ranking movements Legend: ██ Increase in ranking ██ Decrease in ranking — = Not ranked RV = Received votes
	Week																
Poll	Pre	1	2	3	4	5	6	7	8	9	10	11	12	13	14	15	Final
AP	—	—	RV	24	19	24	23	22	20	24	—	—	24	22	21	21	16
Coaches	—	—	RV	RV	21	25	23	21	21	24	RV	RV	RV	25	21	21	16
CFP	Not released										—	—	25	23	21	20	Not released

== Game summaries ==
=== vs Eastern Illinois (FCS) ===
Eastern Illinois Panthers (FCS) (0–0) at Illinois Fighting Illini (0–0) – Game summary

Quarter	1	2	3	4	Total
Panthers (FCS)	0	0	0	0	0
Fighting Illini	14	17	7	7	45

at Memorial Stadium • Champaign, IL

- Date: August 29
- Game time: 8:00 p.m. CDT
- Game weather: Sunny, 82 °F (28 °C)
- Game attendance: 43,849
- Referee: Ron Snodgrass
- TV announcers (BTN): Mark Followill (play-by-play), Jeremy Leman (analyst), and Kylen Mills (sideline reporter)

Game information

First quarter

- (4:15) ILL – Pat Bryant 15-yard pass from Luke Altmyer (David Olano kick) (Drive: 10 plays, 77 yards, 5:12; Illinois 7–0)
- (0:43) ILL – Tanner Arkin 5-yard pass from Luke Altmyer (David Olano kick) (Drive: 4 plays, 25 yards, 1:49; Illinois 14–0)

Second quarter

- (10:10) ILL – David Olano 39-yard field goal (Drive: 10 plays, 53 yards, 4:45; Illinois 17–0)
- (4:43) ILL – Pat Bryant 28-yard pass from Luke Altmyer (David Olano kick) (Drive: 2 plays, 29 yards, 0:38; Illinois 24–0)
- (1:30) ILL – Malik Elzy 34 yard pass from Luke Altmyer (David Olano kick) (Drive: 4 plays, 67 yards, 0:59; Illinois 31–0)

Third quarter

- (7:04) ILL – Kaden Feagin 1-yard run (David Olano kick) (Drive: 9 plays, 86 yards, 4:40; Illinois 38–0)

Fourth quarter

- (13:51) ILL – Josh McCray 6-yard run (David Olano kick) (Drive: 9 plays, 87 yards, 4:27; Illinois 45–0)

Statistics	EIU	ILL
First downs	9	27
Total yards	196	488
Rushing yards	49	246
Passing yards	147	242
Passing: comp–att–int	16–32–2	21–29–0
Time of possession	23:59	36:01

Team	Category	Player	Statistics
Eastern Illinois	Passing	Pierce Holley	16/32, 147 yards, 2 INT
Eastern Illinois	Rushing	MJ Flowers	9 carries, 28 yards
Eastern Illinois	Receiving	DeAirious Smith	5 receptions, 63 yards
Illinois	Passing	Luke Altmyer	19/24, 213 yards, 4 TD
Illinois	Rushing	Kaden Feagin	16 carries, 108 yards, 1 TD
Illinois	Receiving	Pat Bryant	5 receptions, 63 yards, 2 TD

=== vs No. 19 Kansas ===
No. 19 Kansas Jayhawks (1–0) vs Illinois Fighting Illini (1–0) – Game summary

Quarter	1	2	3	4	Total
No. 19 Jayhawks	0	10	7	0	17
Fighting Illini	3	10	0	10	23

at Memorial Stadium • Champaign, Illinois

- Date: September 7
- Game time: 6:00 p.m. CDT
- Game weather: Sunny • Temperature: 67 °F (19 °C) • Wind: N 8 mph
- Game attendance: 60,670
- Referee: David Alvarez
- TV announcers (FS1): Alex Faust (play-by-play) and Robert Smith (analyst)

Game information

First quarter

- (3:35) ILL – David Olano 23-yard field goal (Drive: 14 plays, 62 yards, 7:35; Illinois 3–0)

Second quarter

- (12:39) KAN – Tabor Allen 29-yard field goal (Drive: 10 plays, 64 yards, 5:56; Tied 3–3)
- (3:32) KAN – Luke Grimm 3-yard pass from Jalon Daniels, Tabor Allen kick (Drive: 7 plays, 81 yards, 3:05; Kansas 10–3)
- (1:05) ILL – David Olano 50-yard field goal (Drive: 7 plays, 43 yards, 2:27; Kansas 10–6)
- (0:36) ILL – Xavier Scott 30-yard interception, David Olano kick (Illinois 13–10)

Third quarter

- (4:57) KAN – Lawrence Arnold 13-yard pass from Jalon Daniels, Tabor Allen kick (Drive: 14 plays, 81 yards, 8:17; Kansas 17–13)

Fourth quarter

- (9:34) ILL – Kaden Feagin 1-yard run, David Olano kick (Drive: 8 plays, 80 yards, 3:54; Illinois 20–17)
- (0:58) ILL – David Olano 43-yard field goal (Drive: 15 plays, 42 yards, 6:46; Illinois 23–17)

Statistics	KU	ILL
First downs	18	14
Total yards	65–327	59–271
Rushing yards	33–186	34–79
Passing yards	141	192
Passing: comp–att–int	18–32–3	16–25–0
Time of possession	29:22	30:38

Team	Category	Player	Statistics
Kansas	Passing	Jalon Daniels	18/32, 141 yards, 2 TD, 3 INT
Kansas	Rushing	Devin Neal	14 carries, 101 yards
Kansas	Receiving	Lawrence Arnold	4 receptions, 44 yards, 1 TD
Illinois	Passing	Luke Altmyer	16/25, 192 yards
Illinois	Rushing	Kaden Feagin	16 carries, 40 yards, 1 TD
Illinois	Receiving	Zakhari Franklin	9 receptions, 99 yards

=== vs Central Michigan ===
Central Michigan Chippewas (1–1) vs Illinois Fighting Illini (2–0) – Game summary

Quarter	1	2	3	4	Total
Chippewas	3	3	0	3	9
Fighting Illini	7	6	10	7	30

at Memorial Stadium • Champaign, Illinois

- Date: September 14
- Game time: 11:00 a.m. CDT
- Game weather: 79 °F (26 °C), sunny
- Game attendance: 51,498
- Referee: Kole Knueppel
- TV announcers (Peacock): Jac Collinsworth (play-by-play), Michael Robinson (analyst), and Caroline Pineda (sideline reporter)
- FightingIllini.com box score

Game information

First quarter

- ILL – Pat Bryant 11-yard pass from Luke Altmyer (David Olano kick), 7:05. Illinois 7–0. Drive: 12 plays, 59 yards, 6:25.
- CMU – Tristan Mattson 32-yard field goal, 1:58. Illinois 7–3. Drive: 10 plays, 61 yards, 5:07.

Second quarter

- ILL – David Olano 49-yard field goal, 1:55. Illinois 10–3. Drive: 6 plays, 26 yards, 2:53.
- CMU – Tristan Mattson 29-yard field goal, 0:36. Illinois 10–6. Drive: 10 plays, 64 yards, 1:19.
- ILL – Ethan Moczulski 59-yard field goal, 0:00. Illinois 13–6. Drive: 5 plays, 34 yards, 0:36.

Third quarter

- ILL – Pat Bryant 20-yard pass from Luke Altmyer (David Olano kick), 13:05. Illinois 20–6. Drive: 4 plays, 75 yards, 1:55.
- ILL – David Olano 34-yard field goal, 4:43. Illinois 23–6. Drive: 10 plays, 62 yards, 4:29.

Fourth quarter

- CMU – Tristan Mattson 25-yard field goal, 11:58. Illinois 23–9. Drive: 12 plays, 59 yards, 3:59.
- ILL – Kadin Feagin 2-yard run (David Olano kick), 9:34. Illinois 30–9. Drive: 4 plays, 46 yards, 2:23.

Statistics	CMU	ILL
First downs	19	20
Total yards	62–309	58–379
Rushing yards	33–142	29–137
Passing yards	167	242
Passing: comp–att–int	15–29–1	19–29–0
Time of possession	20:03	30:57

Team	Category	Player	Statistics
Central Michigan	Passing	Joe Labas	12/25, 125 yards, 1 INT
Central Michigan	Rushing	Myles Bailey	6 carries, 49 yards
Central Michigan	Receiving	Evan Boyd	3 receptions, 38 yards
Illinois	Passing	Luke Altmyer	19/29, 242 yards, 2 TD
Illinois	Rushing	Josh McCray	8 carries, 54 yards
Illinois	Receiving	Pat Bryant	7 receptions, 102 yards, 2 TD

=== at No. 22 Nebraska ===
No. 24 Illinois Fighting Illini (3–0) at No. 22 Nebraska Cornhuskers (3–0) – Game summary

Quarter	1	2	3	4	OT	Total
No. 24 Fighting Illini	7	3	7	7	7	31
No. 22 Cornhuskers	10	7	0	7	0	24

at Memorial Stadium • Lincoln, Nebraska

- Date: September 20
- Game time: 7:00 p.m. CDT
- Game weather: Sunny
- Game attendance: 86,936
- Referee: Greg Blum
- TV announcers (FOX): Tim Brando (play-by-play), Devin Gardner (analyst), and Josh Sims (sideline)

Game information

First Quarter

- (11:54) ILL – Pat Bryant 27 yard pass from Luke Altmyer, David Olano kick (Drive: 6 plays, 78 yards, 2:08, Illinois 7–0)
- (3:15) NEB – John Hohl 21 yard field goal (Drive: 18 plays, 72 yards, 8:39, Illinois 7–3)
- (0:32) NEB – Isaiah Neyor 6 yard pass from Dylan Raiola, John Hohl kick (Drive: 4 plays, 37 yards, 2:09, Nebraska 10–7)

Second Quarter

- (11:37) ILL – David Olano 26 yard field goal (Drive: 8 plays, 62 yards, 3:48, 10–10)
- (0:16) NEB – Isaiah Neyor 11 yard pass from Dylan Raiola, John Hohl kick (Drive: 9 plays, 70 yards, 3:06, Nebraska 17–10)

Third Quarter

- (1:55) ILL – Tanner Arkin 3 yard pass from Luke Altmyer, David Olano kick (Drive: 11 plays, 57 yards, 5:00, 17–17)

Fourth Quarter

- (14:57) NEB – Janiran Bonner 1 yard pass from Dylan Raiola, John Hohl kick (Drive: 5 plays, 75 yards, 1:58, Nebraska 24–17)
- (10:36) ILL – Brandon Henderson 6 yard pass from Luke Altmyer, David Olano kick (Drive: 9 plays, 75 yards, 4:21, 24–24)

Overtime

- ILL – Pat Bryant 4 yard pass from Luke Altmyer, David Olano kick (Drive: 2 plays, 25 yards, Illinois 31–24)

Statistics	ILL	NEB
First downs	25	20
Total yards	66–381	68–345
Rushing yards	39–166	31–77
Passing yards	215	297
Passing: comp–att–int	21–27–0	23–35–1
Time of possession	29:38	30:22

Team	Category	Player	Statistics
Illinois	Passing	Luke Altmyer	21/27, 215 yards, 4 TD
Illinois	Rushing	Kaden Feagin	12 carries, 69 yards
Illinois	Receiving	Pat Bryant	5 reception, 74 yards, 2 TD
Nebraska	Passing	Dylan Raiola	23/35, 284 yards, 3 TD, 1 INT
Nebraska	Rushing	Dante Dowdell	20 carries, 72 yards
Nebraska	Receiving	Isaiah Neyor	4 receptions, 90 yards, 2 TD

=== at No. 9 Penn State ===
No. 19 Illinois Fighting Illini (4–0) at No. 9 Penn State Nittany Lions (3–0) – Game summary

Quarter	1	2	3	4	Total
No. 19 Fighting Illini	7	0	0	0	7
No. 9 Nittany Lions	7	0	7	7	21

at Beaver Stadium • University Park, Pennsylvania

- Date: September 28
- Game time: 6:30 p.m. CDT
- Game weather: Cloudy, 66 °F (19 °C)
- Game attendance: 109,911
- Referee: Jeffrey Servinski
- TV announcers (NBC): Noah Eagle (play-by-play), Todd Blackledge (analyst), and Kathryn Tappen (sideline reporter)

Game information

First quarter

- UI – Carson Goda, 4-yard TD pass from Luke Altmyer, David Olano kick, 9:36 (UI 7–0)
- PSU – Tyler Warren, 3-yard TD run, Sander Sahaydak kick, 5:34 (TIE 7–7)

Second quarter

No scoring

Third quarter

- PSU – Nicholas Singleton, 4-yard TD run, Sahaydak kick, 8:38 (PSU 14–7)

Fourth quarter

- PSU – Kaytron Allen, 5-yard TD run, Ryan Barker kick, 1:55 (PSU 21–7)

Statistics	ILL	PSU
First downs	17	24
Total yards	57–219	65–374
Rushing yards	32–34	44–239
Passing yards	185	135
Passing: comp–att–int	16–25–1	15–21–0
Time of possession	26:11	33:49

Team	Category	Player	Statistics
Illinois	Passing	Luke Altmyer	16/25, 185 yards, TD, INT
Illinois	Rushing	Kaden Feagin	13 carries, 64 yards
Illinois	Receiving	Zakhari Franklin	4 receptions, 49 yards
Penn State	Passing	Drew Allar	15/21, 135 yards
Penn State	Rushing	Kaytron Allen	18 carries, 102 yards, TD
Penn State	Receiving	Harrison Wallace III	4 receptions, 50 yards

=== vs Purdue (rivalry) ===
Purdue Boilermakers (1–4) vs No. 23 Illinois Fighting Illini (4–1) – Game summary

Quarter	1	2	3	4	OT	Total
Boilermakers	0	3	17	23	6	49
No. 23 Fighting Illini	10	14	3	16	7	50

at Memorial Stadium • Champaign, Illinois

- Date: October 12
- Game time: 2:30 p.m. CDT
- Game weather: Sunny, 82 °F (28 °C); Wind: SW 8 miles per hour (13 km/h)
- Game attendance: 55,815
- Referee: Ron Snodgrass
- TV announcers (FS1): Eric Collins (play-by-play) and Spencer Tillman (analyst)
- Box score, Recap

Game information

First quarter

- ILL – David Olano 30-yard field goal, 6:04. ILL 3–0. Drive: 8 plays, 51 yards, 3:45.
- ILL – Josh McCray 11-yard run (David Olano kick), 0:10. ILL 10–0. Drive: 8 plays, 73 yards, 4:26.

Second quarter

- PUR – Spencer Porath 22-yard field goal, 5:41. ILL 10–3. Drive: 9 plays, 74 yards, 4:30.
- ILL – Zakhari Franklin 8-yard pass from Luke Altmyer (David Olano kick), 1:56. ILL 17–3. Drive: 9 plays, 75 yards, 3:45.
- ILL – Josh McCray 6-yard pass from Luke Altmyer (David Olano kick), 0:19. ILL 24–3. Drive: 5 plays, 25 yards, 1:34.

Third quarter

- ILL – David Olano 49-yard field goal, 10:57. ILL 27–3. Drive: 9 plays, 44 yards, 4:03.
- PUR – Jahmal Edrine 53-yard pass from Ryan Browne (Spencer Porath kick), 7:43 ILL 27–10. Drive: 6 plays, 85 yards, 3:10.
- PUR – Will Heldt 16-yard fumble recovery (Spencer Porath kick), 7:35. ILL 27–17.
- PUR – Spencer Porath 24-yard field goal, 0:49. ILL 27–20. Drive: 6 plays, 64 yards, 2:35.

Fourth quarter

- ILL – Luke Altmyer 13-yard run (David Olano kick), 13:17. ILL 34–20. Drive: 5 plays, 75 yards, 2:32.
- PUR – Jaron Tibbs 8-yard pass from Ryan Browne (Max Klare pass), 10:31. ILL 34–28. Drive: 6 plays, 75 yards, 2:46.
- ILL – Josh McCray 3-yard run (missed try), 5:05. ILL 40–28. Drive: 10 plays, 75 yards, 5:26.
- PUR – Devin Mockobee 2-yard run (Spencer Porath kick), 1:35. ILL 40–35. Drive: 10 plays, 75 yards, 3:30.
- PUR – Devin Mockobee 13-yard pass from Ryan Browne (Jahmal Edrine pass) 0:46. PUR 43–40. Drive: 3 plays, 43 yards, 0:49.
- ILL – David Olano 38-yard field goal, 0:00. Tied 43–43. Drive: 7 plays, 53 yards, 0:42.

Overtime

- ILL – Pat Bryant 25-yard pass from Luke Altmyer (David Olano kick), 0:00. ILL 50–43. Drive: 1 plays, 25 yards, TOP 0:00.
- PUR – Arhmad Branch 3-yard run ( ), 0:00. ILL 50–49. Drive: 2 plays, 25 yards, TOP 0:00.

Statistics	PUR	ILL
First downs	21	28
Total yards	58–536	73–556
Rushing yards	32–239	39–177
Passing yards	297	379
Passing: comp–att–int	18–26–0	20–34–0
Time of possession	26:49	33:11

Team	Category	Player	Statistics
Purdue	Passing	Ryan Browne	18/26, 297 yards, 3 TD
Purdue	Rushing	Ryan Browne	17 carries, 118 yards
Purdue	Receiving	Max Klare	6 receptions, 133 yards
Illinois	Passing	Luke Altmyer	20/34, 379 yards, 3 TD
Illinois	Rushing	Josh McCray	16 carries, 78 yards, 2 TD
Illinois	Receiving	Pat Bryant	4 receptions, 104 yards, 1 TD

=== vs No. 24 Michigan (rivalry) ===
No. 24 Michigan Wolverines (4–2) vs No. 22 Illinois Fighting Illini (5–1) – Game summary

Quarter	1	2	3	4	Total
No. 24 Wolverines	0	7	0	0	7
No. 22 Fighting Illini	3	10	8	0	21

at Memorial Stadium • Champaign, Illinois

- Date: October 19
- Game time: 2:30 p.m. CDT
- Game weather: 72 °F (22 °C), sunny, SW 4 miles per hour (6.4 km/h)
- Game attendance: 60,670
- Referee: Tim O'Dey
- TV announcers (CBS): Brad Nessler (play-by-play), Gary Danielson (analyst), and Jenny Dell (sideline reporter)

Game information

First quarter

- (12:07) Illinois – David Olano 47-yard field gold (Drive: 7 plays, 46 yards, 2:53; Illinois 3–0)

Second quarter

- (11:35) Illinois – David Olano 32-yard field gold (Drive: 5 plays, 24 yards, 2:37; Illinois 6–0)
- (7:53) Illinois – Tanner Arkin 2-yard pass from Luke Altmyer (David Olano kick) (Drive: 7 plays, 51 yards, 3:04; Illinois 13–0)
- (1:40) Michigan – Kalel Mullings 1-yard run (Dominic Zvada kick) (Drive: 12 plays, 72 yards, 6:07; Illinois 13–7)

Third quarter

- (9:16) Illinois – Luke Altmyer 1-yard run (Donovan Leary–Zakhari Franklin pass) (Drive: 8 plays, 55 yards, 3:47; Illinois 21–7)

Fourth quarter

- No scoring plays

Statistics	MICH	ILL
First downs	20	18
Total yards	70–322	57–267
Rushing yards	38–114	38–187
Passing yards	208	80
Passing: comp–att–int	20–32–1	9–19–0
Time of possession	33:34	26:26

Team	Category	Player	Statistics
Michigan	Passing	Jack Tuttle	20/32, 208 yards, 1 INT
Michigan	Rushing	Kalel Mullings	19 carries, 87 yards, 1 TD
Michigan	Receiving	Colston Loveland	7 receptions, 83 yards
Illinois	Passing	Luke Altmyer	9/18, 80 yards, 1 TD
Illinois	Rushing	Aidan Laughery	9 carries, 54 yards
Illinois	Receiving	Pat Bryant	4 receptions, 32 yards

=== at No. 1 Oregon ===
No. 20 Illinois Fighting Illini (6–1) at No. 1 Oregon Ducks (7–0) – Game summary

Quarter	1	2	3	4	Total
No. 20 Fighting Illini	3	0	6	0	9
No. 1 Ducks	14	21	0	3	38

at Autzen Stadium • Eugene, Oregon

- Date: October 26
- Game time: 2:30 p.m. CDT
- Game weather: Sunny • Temperature: 70 °F (21 °C) • Wind: SW 5 miles per hour (8.0 km/h)
- Game attendance: 59,830
- Referee: Mark Kluczynski
- TV announcers (CBS): Brad Nessler (play-by-play), Gary Danielson (analyst), and Jenny Dell (sideline reporter)

Game information

First quarter

- (10:49) ORE – Tez Johnson 31-yard pass from Dillon Gabriel, Atticus Sappington kick (Drive: 9 plays, 83 yards, 4:05; Oregon 7–0)
- (6:05) ORE – Justius Lowe 34-yard pass from Dillon Gabriel, Atticus Sappington kick (Drive: 7 plays, 58 yards, 2:41; Oregon 14–0)
- (1:34) ILL – David Olano 38-yard field goal (Drive: 6 plays, 46 yards, 2:00; Oregon 14–3)

Second quarter

- (12:20) ORE – Dillon Gabriel 7-yard run, Atticus Sappington kick (Drive: 8 plays, 65 yards, 4:14; Oregon 21–3)
- (6:09) ORE – Noah Whittington 18-yard run, Atticus Sappington kick (Drive: 6 plays, 54 yards, 3:13; Oregon 28–3)
- (0:29) ORE – Noah Whittington 2-yard pass from Dillon Gabriel, Atticus Sappington kick (Drive: 8 plays, 89 yards, 2:03; Oregon 35–3)

Third quarter

- (0:46) ILL – Ca'Lil Valentine 4-yard run, two-point run failed (Drive: 16 plays, 95 yards, 6:42; Oregon 35–9)

Fourth quarter

- (9:04) ORE – Andrew Boyle 44-yard field goal (Drive: 7 plays, 40 yards, 3:05. Oregon 38–9)

Statistics	ILL	ORE
First downs	18	27
Total yards	67–293	67–527
Rushing yards	32–132	39–229
Passing yards	161	298
Passing: comp–att–int	17–35–2	20–28–1
Time of possession	28:45	31:15

Team	Category	Player	Statistics
Illinois	Passing	Luke Altmyer	17/35, 162 yards, 2 INT
Illinois	Rushing	Aidan Laughery	12 carries, 69 yards
Illinois	Receiving	Zakhari Franklin	6 receptions, 72 yards
Oregon	Passing	Dillon Gabriel	18/26, 291 yards, 3 TD, INT
Oregon	Rushing	Jordan James	15 carries, 83 yards
Oregon	Receiving	Tez Johnson	6 receptions, 102 yards, TD

=== vs Minnesota ===
Minnesota Golden Gophers (5–3) vs No. 24 Illinois Fighting Illini (6–2) – Game summary

Quarter	1	2	3	4	Total
Golden Gophers	3	10	3	9	25
No. 24 Fighting Illini	0	10	0	7	17

at Memorial Stadium • Champaign, Illinois

- Date: November 2
- Game time: 11:00 a.m. CDT
- Game weather: • Sunny Temperature: 52 °F (11 °C) • Wind: 9 mph
- Game attendance: 58,088
- Referee: Larry Smith
- TV announcers (FS1): Tim Brando (play-by-play), Devin Gardner (analyst), and Josh Sims (sideline reporter)

Game information

First quarter

- (6:21) MINN – Dragan Kesich 20-yard field goal (Drive: 11 plays, 42 yards, 4:48; Minnesota 3–0)

Second quarter

- (10:08) ILL – David Olano 25-yard field goal (Drive: 11 plays, 65 yards, 6:26; Tied 3–3)
- (6:55) MINN – Darius Taylor 29-yard run, Dragan Kesich kick (Drive: 8 plays, 65 yards, 3:13; Minnesota 10–3)
- (3:28) ILL – Josh McCray 42-yard run, David Olano kick (Drive: 7 plays, 75 yards, 3:26; Tied 10–10)
- (0:19) MINN – Dragan Kesich 45-yard field goal (Drive: 8 plays, 48 yards, 3:09; Minnesota 13–10)

Third quarter

- (4:36) MINN – Dragan Kesich 38-yard field goal (Drive: 12 plays, 44 yards, 6:33; Minnesota 16–10)

Fourth quarter

- (9:03) ILL – Zakhari Franklin 21-yard pass from Luke Altmyer, David Olano kick (Drive: 5 plays, 54 yards, 2:08; Illinois 17–16)
- (5:14) MINN – Jameson Geers 1-yard pass from Max Brosmer, two-point pass failed (Drive: 7 plays, 75 yards, 3:49; Minnesota 22–17)
- (1:52) MINN – Dragan Kesich 46-yard field goal (Drive: 4 plays, 3 yards, 1:25; Minnesota 25–17)

Statistics	MINN	ILL
First downs	21	20
Total yards	361	352
Rushing yards	148	126
Passing yards	213	226
Passing: comp–att–int	22–37–0	20–33–0
Time of possession	34:59	25:01

Team	Category	Player	Statistics
Minnesota	Passing	Max Brosmer	22/37, 213 yards, TD
Minnesota	Rushing	Darius Taylor	22 carries, 131 yards, TD
Minnesota	Receiving	Daniel Jackson	5 receptions, 74 yards, TD
Illinois	Passing	Luke Altmyer	20/33, 226 yards, TD
Illinois	Rushing	Josh McCray	7 carries, 72 yards, TD
Illinois	Receiving	Pat Bryant	5 receptions, 72 yards

=== vs Michigan State ===
Michigan State Spartans (4–5) vs Illinois Fighting Illini (6–3) – Game summary

Quarter	1	2	3	4	Total
Spartans	6	3	7	0	16
Fighting Illini	14	7	3	14	38

at Memorial Stadium • Champaign, Illinois

- Date: November 16
- Game time: 1:30 p.m. CST
- Game weather: • Cloudy Temperature: 51 °F (11 °C) • Wind: 13 mph
- Game attendance: 52,660
- Referee: Chris Coyte
- TV announcers (FS1): Alex Faust (play-by-play) and Robert Smith (analyst)
- FightingIllini.com box score

Game information

First quarter

- (09:52) ILL TD: Pat Bryant 57-yard pass from Luke Altmyer (David Olano kick) ILL 7–0; 2 plays, 74 yards, 1:04
- (07:53) MSU TD: Aziah Johnson 52-yard pass from Aidan Chiles (Jonathan Kim miss) ILL 7–6; 4 plays, 75 yards, 1:59
- (01:06) ILL TD: Josh McCray 11-yard run (David Olano kick) ILL 14–6; 13 plays, 75 yards, 6:47

Second quarter

- (02:01) ILL TD: Zakhari Franklin 4-yard pass from Luke Altmyer (David Olano kick) ILL 21–6; 12 plays, 64 yards, 6:09
- (01:02) MSU FG: Jonathan Kim 38-yard field goal ILL 21–9; 9 plays, 55 yards, 00:59

Third quarter

- (09:35) MSU TD: Nathan Carter 5-yard pass from Aidan Chiles (Jonathan Kim kick) ILL 21–16; 10 plays, 75 yards, 5:25
- (05:45) ILL FG: David Olano 37-yard field goal ILL 24–16; 8 plays, 56 yards, 3:50

Four quarter

- (07:30) ILL TD: Josh McCray 1-yard run (David Olano kick) ILL 31–16; 8 plays, 49 yards, 5:16
- (01:56) ILL TD: Josh McCray 1-yard run (David Olano kick) ILL 38–16; 4 plays, 38 yards, 2:10

Statistics	MSU	ILL
First downs	18	18
Total yards	343	369
Rushing yards	87	138
Passing yards	256	231
Passing: comp–att–int	23–40–0	19–32–0
Time of possession	28:32	31:28

Team	Category	Player	Statistics
Michigan State	Passing	Aidan Chiles	23/40, 256 yards, 2 TD
Michigan State	Rushing	Aidan Chiles	12 carries, 40 yards
Michigan State	Receiving	Montorie Foster Jr.	7 receptions, 76 yards
Illinois	Passing	Luke Altmyer	19/32, 231 yards, 2 TD
Illinois	Rushing	Josh McCray	9 carries, 61 yards, 3 TD
Illinois	Receiving	Pat Bryant	4 receptions, 135 yards, 1 TD

=== at Rutgers ===
No. 25 Illinois Fighting Illini (7–3) at Rutgers Scarlet Knights (6–4) – Game summary

Quarter	1	2	3	4	Total
No. 25 Fighting Illini	0	9	6	23	38
Scarlet Knights	3	14	0	14	31

at SHI Stadium • Piscataway, New Jersey

- Date: November 23
- Game time: 11:00 a.m. CST
- Game weather: • Sunny Temperature: 49 °F (9 °C) • Wind: 17 mph
- Game attendance: 47,524
- Referee: Larry Smith
- TV announcers (Peacock): Andrew Siciliano (play-by-play), Michael Robinson (analyst), and Caroline Pineda (sideline)
- FightingIllini.com box score

Statistics	ILL	RUTG
First downs	24	30
Total yards	431	388
Rushing yards	182	213
Passing yards	249	197
Passing: comp–att–int	12–26–0	19–37–0
Time of possession	25:38	34:18

Team	Category	Player	Statistics
Illinois	Passing	Luke Altmyer	12/26, 249 yards, 2 TD
Illinois	Rushing	Luke Altmyer	11 carries, 74 yards, TD
Illinois	Receiving	Pat Bryant	7 receptions, 197 yards, TD
Rutgers	Passing	Athan Kaliakmanis	19/37, 175 yards, 2 TD
Rutgers	Rushing	Kyle Monangai	28 carries, 122 yards
Rutgers	Receiving	Ian Strong	6 receptions, 66 yards, TD

=== at Northwestern (rivalry) ===
No. 23 Illinois Fighting Illini (8–3) at Northwestern Wildcats (4–7) – Game summary

Quarter	1	2	3	4	Total
No. 23 Fighting Illini	7	7	14	10	38
Wildcats	10	0	10	8	28

at Wrigley Field • Chicago, Illinois

- Date: November 30
- Game time: 11:00 a.m. CST
- Game weather: 18 °F (−8 °C), sunny
- Game attendance: 26,378
- Referee: Kole Knueppel
- TV announcers (BTN): Chris Vosters (play-by-play), Matt Millen (analyst), and Kylen Mills (sideline reporter)
- FightingIllini.com box score

Game information

First quarter

- (9:31) NU – Luke Akers 21-yard field goal (Drive: 12 plays, 72 yards, 5:29; Northwestern 3–0)
- (8:12) UI – Aidan Laughery 30-yard run, David Olano kick (Drive: 3 plays, 73 yards, 1:14; Illinois 7–3)
- (2:14) NU – Devin Turner 13-yard interception, Luke Akers kick (Northwestern 10–7)

Second quarter

- (13:21) UI – Luke Altmyer 1-yard run, David Olano kick (Drive: 8 plays, 65 yards, 3:46; Illinois 14–10)

Third quarter

- (14:15) UI – Aidan Laughery 64-yard run, David Olano kick (Drive: 2 plays, 69 yards, 0:39; Illinois 21–10)
- (10:08) UI – Pat Bryant 43-yard pass from Luke Altmyer, David Olano kick (Drive: 5 plays, 62 yards, 2:36; Illinois 28–10)
- (5:35) NU – Luke Akers 34-yard field goal (Drive: 10 plays, 59 yards, 4:33; Illinois 28–13)
- (1:34) NU – A. J. Henning 11-yard pass from Jack Lausch, Luke Akers kick (Drive: 5 plays, 40 yards, 2:35; Illinois 28–20)

Fourth quarter

- (12:15) UI – Aidan Laughery 31-yard run, David Olano kick (Drive: 4 plays, 42 yards, 1:54; Illinois 35–20)
- (11:06) UI – David Olano 24-yard field goal (Drive: 4 plays, 3 yards, 0:57; Illinois 38–20)
- (1:00) NU – Thomas Gordon 15-yard pass from Jack Lausch, Marshall Lang pass (Drive: 10 plays, 80 yards, 1:42; Illinois 38–28)

Statistics	ILL	NW
First downs	14	28
Total yards	382	442
Rushing yards	212	113
Passing yards	170	329
Passing: comp–att–int	10–17–2	29–61–3
Time of possession	25:28	34:32

Team	Category	Player	Statistics
Illinois	Passing	Luke Altmyer	10/17, 170 yards, TD, 2 INT
Illinois	Rushing	Aidan Laughery	12 carries, 172 yards, 3 TD
Illinois	Receiving	Pat Bryant	4 receptions, 70 yards, TD
Northwestern	Passing	Jack Lausch	25/48, 287 yards, 2 TD, 2 INT
Northwestern	Rushing	Cam Porter	12 carries, 53 yards
Northwestern	Receiving	A. J. Henning	10 receptions, 119 yards, TD

=== vs No. 15 South Carolina (Citrus Bowl) ===
2024 Citrus Bowl
No. 15 South Carolina Gamecocks (9–3) vs No. 20 Illinois Fighting Illini (9–3) – Game summary

Quarter	1	2	3	4	Total
No. 15 Gamecocks	3	0	7	7	17
No. 20 Fighting Illini	7	0	7	7	21

at Camping World Stadium • Orlando, Florida

- Date: Tuesday, December 31, 2024
- Game time: 2:00 p.m. CST
- Game attendance: 47,129
- TV announcers (ABC/ESPN Radio): Mark Jones (play-by-play), Roddy Jones (analyst), and Quint Kessenich (sideline)/Shawn Kelley (play-by-play), Rene Ingoglia (analyst), and Marilyn Payne (sideline)

Game information

First quarter

- (7:24) SCAR – Alex Herrera 29-yard field goal (Drive: 11 plays, 47 yards, 5:48; South Carolina 3–0)
- (0:00) ILL – Zakhari Franklin 15–yard pass from Luke Altmyer, David Olano kick (Drive: 11 plays, 66 yards, 5:13; Illinois 7–3)

Second quarter

- No scoring plays

Third quarter

- (10:50) SCAR – Oscar Adaway III 36-yard run, Alex Herrera kick (Drive: 5 plays, 58 yards, 1:24; South Carolina 10–7)
- (2:23) ILL – Josh McCray 3-yard run, David Olano kick (Drive: 9 plays, 63 yards, 4:36; Illinois 14–10)

Fourth quarter

- (14:56) SCAR – Joshua Simon 6-yard pass from LaNorris Sellers, Alex Herrera kick (Drive: 5 plays, 75 yards, 2:27; South Carolina 17–14)
- (7:29) ILL – Josh McCray 9-yard run, David Olano kick (Drive: 12 plays, 75 yards, 7:27; Illinois 21–17)

Statistics	SCAR	ILL
First downs	20	22
Total yards	390	357
Rushing yards	130	183
Passing yards	260	174
Passing: Comp–Att–Int	24–35–0	13–22–1
Time of possession	31:16	28:44

Team	Category	Player	Statistics
South Carolina	Passing	LaNorris Sellers	24/34, 260 yards, 1 TD
South Carolina	Rushing	Oscar Adaway III	14 carries, 69 yards, 1 TD
South Carolina	Receiving	Joshua Simon	6 receptions, 69 yards, 1 TD
Illinois	Passing	Luke Altmyer	13/22, 174 yards, 1 TD, 1 INT
Illinois	Rushing	Josh McCray	13 carries, 114 yards, 2 TD
Illinois	Receiving	Hank Beatty	4 receptions, 90 yards

== Roster ==
2024 Illinois Fighting Illini football team roster
Players
Coaches
Offense

Pos.	#	Name	Class
QB	0	Trey Petty	Fr
WR	1	Mario Sanders II	So
WR	2	Ashton Hollins	So
RB	3	Kaden Feagin	So
WR	4	Zakhari Franklin	Sr
RB	5	Ca'lil Valentine	Fr
RB	6	Josh McCray	Jr
WR	7	Kenari Wilcher	So
WR	8	Malik Elzy	So
QB	9	Luke Altmyer	Jr
QB	10	Donovan Leary	So
QB	11	Jake Huber	Jr
QB	12	Kirkland Michaux	Jr
WR	13	Pat Bryant	Sr
TE	14	Cole Rusk	Jr
WR	15	Alexander Capka-Jones	Jr
QB	16	Cal Swanson	Fr
WR	17	Collin Dixon	Fr
WR	18	Michael Bartolotta	Jr
WR	20	Morrison Giggetts	Fr
RB	21	Aidan Laughery	So
RB	22	Petey Olaleye	Fr
RB	23	Jordan Anderson	So
RB	25	Aaron Ball	Fr
RB	27	Corey Rashad	Fr
WR	28	Karson Kaiser	Fr
TE	39	Jake Furtney	Fr
TE	41	Clayton Leonard	So
TE	42	Jake Petrow	Fr
TE	43	Nick True	Fr
OL	53	Devin Hale	Jr
OL	55	T. J. McMillen	Fr
OL	56	Magnus Møller	So
OL	57	Zach Barrett	Fr
OL	58	Melvin Priestly	Jr
OL	60	Joep Engbers	Fr
OL	62	Sam Tsagalis	So
OL	63	Dezmond Schuster	Jr
OL	64	Josh Kreutz	Jr
OL	65	Kellen Francis	So
OL	66	Brandon Hansen	Fr
OL	67	Steven Scott III	Fr
OL	70	Zach Aamland	Fr
OL	71	Hunter Whitenack	Jr
OL	72	Zy Crisler	Sr
OL	73	Josh Gesky	Jr
OL	74	J. C. Davis	Sr
OL	75	Brandon Henderson	So
OL	78	Kevin Wigenton II	Jr
OL	79	Zafir Stewart	Fr
WR	80	Hank Beatty	Jr
WR	81	Carlos Orr-Gillespie	Fr
WR	83	Tysean Griffin	Fr
TE	84	Carson Goda	Sr
TE	85	Tanner Arkin	Jr
WR	86	Weston Adams	So
WR	87	Tyler McClure	Jr
TE	88	Henry Boyer	So
TE	89	Tanner Hollinger	Fr

Defense

Pos.	#	Name	Class
DB	0	Chase Canada	So
DB	1	Demetrius Hill	Jr
DB	2	Saboor Karriem	So
OLB	3	Alec Bryant	Jr
OLB	4	Daniel Brown	Jr
DB	5	Torrie Cox Jr.	Jr
DL	6	Dennis Briggs Jr.	Sr
DB	7	Matthew Bailey	So
DB	8	Terrance Brooks	Jr
OLB	9	Seth Coleman	Sr
DB	10	Miles Scott	Jr
DL	11	Alex Bray	So
DB	12	Amar Reynolds	Fr
DB	14	Xavier Scott	Jr
DB	16	Tanner Heckel	Fr
OLB	17	Gabe Jacas	Jr
OLB	18	Mason Muragin	Fr
DB	19	Tyson Rooks	So
DB	20	Tyler Strain	Jr
DB	21	Ben Clawson	So
DB	22	Kaleb Patterson	So
DL	23	Terah Edwards	Sr
DB	24	Vernon Woodward III	Fr
DB	25	Jaheim Clarke	So
DB	26	Mac Resetich	So
DL	27	Enyce Sledge	So
LB	28	Dylan Rosiek	Jr
DB	29	T. J. Griffin	So
OLB	30	JoJo Hayden	Fr
DB	32	C. J. Bufkin	Sr
DL	33	Ezekiel Holmes	Sr
LB	34	Ryan Meed	Sr
DB	35	Grayson Griffin	Jr
DB	36	Blayne Sisson	Fr
DB	37	Sage Luther	Sr
LB	39	Kenenna Odeluga	Jr
LB	40	Ronan Poynton	Fr
LB	41	James Kruetz	So
LB	42	Luke Zardzin	Jr
OLB	43	Joe Barna	Fr
DL	44	Angelo McCullom	Fr
LB	45	Malachi Hood	So
LB	47	Easton Baker	Fr
OLB	48	Carter Smith	Fr
OLB	49	Harrysson Ngassa	Fr
DL	52	Pat Farrell	Fr
OLB	54	Demetrius John	Fr
DL	55	Jeremiah Warren	Fr
DL	56	Guillermo Gallardo	Jr
DL	78	Eddie Tuerk	Fr
DL	92	Gentle Hunt	Sr
DL	93	Henry Engel	Fr

Special teams

Pos.	#	Name	Class
P	19	Hugh Robertson	Jr
K	24	David Olano	So
K	27	Ethan Moczulski	So
P	31	Declan Duley	Fr
LS	36	Lane Hansen	Jr
LS	44	Patrick Mahoney III	Fr
LS	51	Aidan Hall	Sr
K/P	98	Fabrizio Pinton	Jr

Head coach

- Bret Bielema

Coordinators/assistant coaches

- Barry Lunney Jr. – Offensive coordinator/Quarterbacks
- Aaron Henry – Defensive coordinator/secondary
- Terrance Jamison – Co-defensive coordinator/Defensive line
- Robby Discher – Special teams coordinator/Tight ends
- Archie McDaniel – Linebackers
- Bart Miller – Offensive line
- Corey Parker – Defensive Backs
- Clint Sintim – Outside linebackers
- Justin Stepp – Wide receivers
- Thad Ward – Running backs/Assistant head coach
- Ben Miller – Senior head coach analyst
- Dana Dimel – Senior offensive assistant
- Myers Hendrickson – Senior analyst
- Chris Hurd – Senior special teams assistant
- Byron Bell – Assistant offensive line
- Danny Cameron – Assistant tight ends
- Houston Griffith – Assistant wide receivers
- Dele Harding – Assistant running backs
- Trent Harris – Assistant outside linebackers
- Grant Morgan – Assistant linebackers
- Alex Panos – Assistant defensive line
- Kevin Laeone Richardson II – Assistant defensive backs
- Ryan Simerson – Assistant secondary
- Artur Sitkowski – Assistant quarterbacks
- Tank Wright – Director, Strength and Conditioning
- GC Yerry – Associate Director, Strength and Conditioning
- Matt Manninger – Assistant, Strength and Conditioning
- Nick Elicone – Assistant, Strength and Conditioning
- Tyler Mayo – Assistant, Strength and Conditioning

Legend

- (C) Team captain
- (S) Suspended
- (I) Ineligible
- Injured
- Redshirt

Roster
Last update: 11/16/2024
