= 2023 Illinois Fighting Illini football team =

American college football season

2023 Illinois Fighting Illini football
- Conference: Big Ten Conference
- Record: 5–7 (3–6 Big Ten)
- Head coach: Bret Bielema (3rd season)
- Offensive coordinator: Barry Lunney Jr. (2nd season)
- Offensive scheme: Spread
- Defensive coordinator: Aaron Henry (1st season)
- Co-defensive coordinator: Terrance Jamison (1st season)
- Base defense: Multiple 3–4
- Home stadium: Memorial Stadium

2023 Big Ten Conference football standings
| | Conf. | | | Overall |
| Team | W | | L | W | | L |
|---|---|---|---|---|---|---|
East Division
| No. 1 Michigan xy$#^ | 9 | – | 0 | 15 | – | 0 |
| No. 10 Ohio State | 8 | – | 1 | 11 | – | 2 |
| No. 13 Penn State | 7 | – | 2 | 10 | – | 3 |
| Maryland | 4 | – | 5 | 8 | – | 5 |
| Rutgers | 3 | – | 6 | 7 | – | 6 |
| Indiana | 1 | – | 8 | 3 | – | 9 |
| Michigan State† | 0 | – | 7 | 0 | – | 8 |
West Division
| No. 24 Iowa xy | 7 | – | 2 | 10 | – | 4 |
| Northwestern | 5 | – | 4 | 8 | – | 5 |
| Wisconsin | 5 | – | 4 | 7 | – | 6 |
| Minnesota | 3 | – | 6 | 6 | – | 7 |
| Illinois | 3 | – | 6 | 5 | – | 7 |
| Nebraska | 3 | – | 6 | 5 | – | 7 |
| Purdue | 3 | – | 6 | 4 | – | 8 |
Championship: Michigan 26, Iowa 0
# – College Football Playoff champion; ^ – College Football Playoff participant; $ – Conference champion; x – Division champion/co-champions; y – Championship game participant; † — NCAA vacated all wins for Michigan State (4–8, 2–7); Rankings from AP Poll

The 2023 Illinois Fighting Illini football team was an American football team that represented the University of Illinois Urbana-Champaign as a member of the Big Ten Conference during the 2023 NCAA Division I FBS football season. In their third season under head coach Bret Bielema, the Fighting Illini compiled a 5–7 record (3–6 in conference games), finished in a four-way tie for fourth/last place in the Big Ten's West Division, and were outscored by a total of 353 to 294. The team played its home games at Memorial Stadium in Champaign, Illinois.

The team's statistical leaders included quarterback Luke Altmyer (1,883 passing yards), running back Reggie Love III (567 rushing yards), wide receiver Isaiah Williams (82 receptions for 1,055 yards), kicker David Olano (89 points scored, 38 of 39 extra points, 17 of 20 field goals), and linebacker Dylan Rosiek (82 total tackles, 52 solo tackles). Isaiah Williams and defensive lineman Johnny Newton received first-team honors on the 2023 All-Big Ten Conference football team.

== Preseason ==
The Illini were predicted to finish fourth in the Big Ten's West Division.

== Schedule ==
| Date | Time | Opponent | Site | TV | Result | Attendance | Source |
|---|---|---|---|---|---|---|---|
| September 2 | 6:30 p.m. | Toledo* | Memorial Stadium; Champaign, IL | BTN | W 30–28 | 48,898 | |
| September 8 | 6:30 p.m. | at Kansas* | David Booth Kansas Memorial Stadium; Lawrence, KS | ESPN2 | L 23–34 | 45,809 | |
| September 16 | 11:00 a.m. | No. 7 Penn State | Memorial Stadium; Champaign, IL | FOX | L 13–30 | 49,099 | |
| September 23 | 2:30 p.m. | Florida Atlantic* | Memorial Stadium; Champaign, IL | BTN | W 23–17 | 53,512 | |
| September 30 | 2:30 p.m. | at Purdue | Ross–Ade Stadium; West Lafayette, IN (rivalry) | Peacock | L 19–44 | 59,510 | |
| October 6 | 6:00 p.m. | Nebraska | Memorial Stadium; Champaign, IL | FS1 | L 7–20 | 46,703 | |
| October 14 | 2:30 p.m. | at Maryland | SECU Stadium; College Park, MD | NBC | W 27–24 | 35,580 | |
| October 21 | 2:30 p.m. | Wisconsin^{†} | Memorial Stadium; Champaign, IL | FS1 | L 21–25 | 54,205 | |
| November 4 | 2:30 p.m. | at Minnesota | Huntington Bank Stadium; Minneapolis, MN | BTN | W 27–26 | 42,906 | |
| November 11 | 11:00 a.m. | Indiana | Memorial Stadium; Champaign, IL (rivalry) | BTN | W 48–45^{OT} | 53,157 | |
| November 18 | 2:30 p.m. | at No. 16 Iowa | Kinnick Stadium; Iowa City, IA | FS1 | L 13–15 | 69,250 | |
| November 25 | 2:30 p.m. | Northwestern | Memorial Stadium; Champaign, IL (rivalry) | BTN | L 43–45 | 42,310 | |
*Non-conference game; ^{†}Homecoming; Rankings from AP Poll (and CFP Rankings, from the date when issued) - Released prior to game; All times are in Central time; Source:

== Roster ==
2023 Illinois Fighting Illini football team roster
Players
Coaches
Offense

| Pos. | # | Name | Class |
|---|---|---|---|
| RB | 0 | Josh McCray | So |
| WR | 1 | Isaiah Williams | Jr |
| WR | 2 | Malik Elzy | Fr |
| RB | 3 | Kaden Feagin | Fr |
| QB | 4 | John Paddock | Sr |
| WR | 6 | Ashton Hollins | Fr |
| WR | 7 | Kenari Wilcher | Fr |
| WR | 8 | Shawn Miller | Fr |
| QB | 9 | Luke Altmyer | So |
| QB | 10 | Donovan Leary | Fr |
| QB | 11 | Jake Huber | So |
| QB | 12 | Kirkland Michaux | So |
| WR | 13 | Pat Bryant | Jr |
| WR | 14 | Casey Washington | Sr |
| WR | 15 | Alexander Capka-Jones | Jr |
| QB | 16 | Cal Swanson | Fr |
| WR | 17 | Collin Dixon | Fr |
| WR | 18 | Chase Miller | Fr |
| WR | 19 | Eian Pugh | Fr |
| RB | 21 | Aidan Laughery | Fr |
| RB | 22 | Jean-Marc Etienne | Jr |
| RB | 23 | Reggie Love III | Jr |
| RB | 24 | Nick Fedanzo | Jr |
| RB | 25 | Jordan Anderson (injured) | Fr |
| RB | 27 | Matthew Bobak | So |
| TE | 36 | Ben Schultz | Jr |
| OL | 53 | Devin Hale | So |
| OL | 54 | Julian Pearl | Sr |
| OL | 55 | T. J. McMillen | Fr |
| OL | 56 | Magnus Møller | Fr |
| OL | 62 | Sam Tsagalis | Fr |
| OL | 63 | Dezmond Schuster | So |
| OL | 64 | Josh Kreutz | So |
| OL | 65 | Joey Okla | Fr |
| OL | 66 | Jordyn Slaughter | Sr |
| OL | 67 | Will Leys | So |
| OL | 68 | Zachary Barlev | So |
| OL | 70 | Zach Aamland | Fr |
| OL | 71 | Hunter Whitenack | So |
| OL | 72 | Zy Crisler | Jr |
| OL | 73 | Josh Gesky | So |
| OL | 75 | Brandon Henderson | Fr |
| OL | 76 | Clayton Leonard | Fr |
| OL | 78 | Isaiah Adams | Sr |
| OL | 79 | Luciano Elias | Fr |
| WR | 80 | Hank Beatty | So |
| TE | 81 | Griffin Moore | Jr |
| TE | 82 | Nate Guinn | Fr |
| WR | 83 | Keion Battle | So |
| TE | 84 | Owen Anderson | Fr |
| TE | 85 | Tanner Arkin | So |
| WR | 86 | Weston Adams | Fr |
| WR | 87 | Tyler McClure | So |
| TE | 88 | Henry Boyer | Fr |
| TE | 89 | Tip Reiman | Jr |

Defense

| Pos. | # | Name | Class |
|---|---|---|---|
| DB | 0 | Nicario Harper | Sr |
| DB | 1 | Demetrius Hill (injured) | So |
| DB | 2 | Saboor Karriem | Fr |
| DB | 3 | Tahveon Nicholson | Jr |
| DT | 4 | Johnny Newton | Jr |
| DB | 5 | Zachary Tobe | Fr |
| DL | 6 | Denzel Daxon | Sr |
| DB | 7 | Matthew Bailey (injured) | So |
| LB | 8 | Tarique Barnes | Sr |
| DB | 9 | Tyson Rooks | Fr |
| DB | 10 | Miles Scott | So |
| DL | 11 | Alex Bray | Fr |
| DB | 12 | Elijah Mc-Cantos | Fr |
| OLB | 13 | Trey Smith | Fr |
| DB | 14 | Xavier Scott | So |
| OLB | 15 | Jared Badie | Fr |
| DB | 16 | Prince Ford | Jr |
| OLB | 17 | Gabe Jacas | So |
| DL | 18 | Mason Muragin | Fr |
| DB | 20 | Tyler Strain | So |
| DB | 21 | Clayton Bush | Sr |
| DB | 22 | Kaleb Patterson | So |
| DL | 23 | Terah Edwards | Jr |
| DB | 25 | Juice Clarke | Fr |
| DB | 26 | Mike Manning | Jr |
| LB | 28 | Dylan Rosiek | So |
| DB | 29 | T. J. Griffin | Fr |
| LB | 30 | JoJo Hayden | Fr |
| DB | 32 | CJ Bufkin | Jr |
| OLB | 33 | Ezekiel Holmes | Sr |
| LB | 34 | Ryan Meed | Jr |
| DB | 35 | Grayson Griffin | So |
| DB | 37 | Solo Turner | Sr |
| DB | 38 | Johnny Schmitt | Fr |
| LB | 39 | Kenenna Odeluga | So |
| LB | 40 | Ronan Poynton | Fr |
| LB | 41 | James Kruetz | Fr |
| LB | 42 | Luke Zardzin | So |
| LB | 43 | Nick True | Fr |
| DB | 44 | Ben Clawson | Fr |
| LB | 45 | Malachi Hood (injured) | Fr |
| DB | 46 | Corey Rashad | Fr |
| DB | 47 | Mac Resetich | Fr |
| DL | 48 | Bryce Barnes | Sr |
| OLB | 49 | Seth Coleman | Jr |
| OLB | 52 | Pat Farrell | Fr |
| DL | 55 | Sed McConnell | So |
| DL | 56 | Jeremiah Warren | Fr |
| DL | 57 | Evan Kirts | Jr |
| DL | 88 | Keith Randolph Jr. | Jr |
| OLB | 90 | Alec Bryant | So |
| DL | 93 | Henry Engel | Fr |
| DL | 94 | Joep Engbers | Fr |
| DL | 95 | Dylan Davis | Jr |
| DL | 99 | Christian Lorenzo | Fr |

Special teams

| Pos. | # | Name | Class |
|---|---|---|---|
| K/P | 5 | Caleb Griffin | Sr |
| P | 19 | Hugh Robertson | So |
| K | 24 | David Olano | Fr |
| P | 31 | Declan Duley | Fr |
| LS | 36 | Lane Hansen | So |
| LS | 39 | Aidan Hall | Jr |
| LS | 42 | Alex McLaughlin | So |
| K/P | 98 | Fabrizio Pinton | So |

Head coach

- Bret Bielema

Coordinators/assistant coaches

- Barry Lunney Jr. – Offensive coordinator/Quarterbacks
- Aaron Henry – Defensive coordinator
- Robby Discher – Special teams coordinator/Tight ends
- Terrance Jamison – Co-defensive coordinator/Defensive line
- Thad Ward – Running backs
- George McDonald – Wide receivers/Assistant head coach
- Antonio Fenelus – Defensive Backs
- Bart Miller – Offensive Line
- Andy Buh – Linebackers
- Charlie Bullen – Outside linebackers/Pass rush coordinator
- Tank Wright – Director, Strength and Conditioning
- GC Yerry – Associate Director, Strength and Conditioning
- Nick Elicone – Assistant, Strength and Conditioning
- Matt Manninger – Assistant, Strength and Conditioning
- Tyler Mayo – Assistant, Strength and Conditioning
- Danny Cameron – Quality Control, Offense
- Max Rosenthal – Quality Control, Offense
- Alex Panos – Quality Control, Defense
- Ryan Simerson – Quality Control, Defense
- Adam Kleffner – Offensive Analyst
- Kevin Laeone Richardson II – Defensive Analyst
- Chris Hurd – Special Teams Analyst
- Vincent Jeffries Jr. – Graduate Assistant
- Tyler King – Graduate Assistant
- Grant Morgan – Graduate Assistant
- Artur Sitkowski – Graduate Assistant

Legend

- (C) Team captain
- (S) Suspended
- (I) Ineligible
- Injured
- Redshirt

Roster
Last update: 9/25/2023
