= 2024 Kansas Jayhawks football team =

American college football season

2024 Kansas Jayhawks football
- Conference: Big 12 Conference
- Record: 5–7 (4–5 Big 12)
- Head coach: Lance Leipold (4th season)
- Offensive coordinator: Jeff Grimes (1st season)
- Co-offensive coordinator: Jim Zebrowski (2nd season)
- Offensive scheme: Multiple
- Defensive coordinator: Brian Borland (4th season)
- Co-defensive coordinator: D. K. McDonald (1st season)
- Base defense: 4–3
- Home stadium: Children's Mercy Park (2 games); Arrowhead Stadium (4 games)

2024 Big 12 Conference football standings
	Conf.			Overall
Team	W		L	W		L
No. 7 Arizona State y$^	7	–	2	11	–	3
No. 15 Iowa State y	7	–	2	11	–	3
No. 13 BYU	7	–	2	11	–	2
No. 25 Colorado	7	–	2	9	–	4
Baylor	6	–	3	8	–	5
TCU	6	–	3	9	–	4
Texas Tech	6	–	3	8	–	5
Kansas State	5	–	4	9	–	4
West Virginia	5	–	4	6	–	7
Kansas	4	–	5	5	–	7
Cincinnati	3	–	6	5	–	7
Houston	3	–	6	4	–	8
Utah	2	–	7	5	–	7
UCF	2	–	7	4	–	8
Arizona	2	–	7	4	–	8
Oklahoma State	0	–	9	3	–	9
Championship: Arizona State 45, Iowa State 19
^ – College Football Playoff participant; $ – Conference champion; y – Championship game participant; Rankings from AP Poll

The 2024 Kansas Jayhawks football team represented the University of Kansas in the 2024 NCAA Division I FBS football season. It was the Jayhawks' 135th season. Due to construction on David Booth Kansas Memorial Stadium, the Jayhawks played their non-conference home games at Children's Mercy Park in Kansas City, Kansas and their conference home games at Arrowhead Stadium in Kansas City, Missouri. They were led by fourth-year head coach Lance Leipold. The Jayhawks looked to win a bowl game in back–to–back seasons for only the second time in program history, and to qualify for a bowl game for a third straight season for the first time in program history.

The Jayhawks also started the year ranked in the AP Top 25 for the first time since the 2009 season. After a stale 2–6 record, which included a 5-game losing streak, including a loss to in-state rival Kansas State for the sixteenth straight year. The Jayhawks upset then no. 17 Iowa State, handed then no. 6 ranked BYU its first loss of the season, and upset no. 16 Colorado to become the first team in FBS history with a losing record to beat 3 straight AP Poll ranked opponents. However, the Jayhawks were defeated in the final game of the season against Baylor, ending their season with a 5–7 record and preventing the team from clinching a third-straight bowl game.

== Offseason ==
=== Coaching staff changes ===
Name	Position	Reason	Replacement
Andy Kotelnicki	Offensive coordinator	Accepted job at Penn State	Jeff Grimes
Matt Lubick	Offensive analyst	Accepted Offensive coordinator job at Nevada	N/A
N/A	Co-Defensive coordinator/Cornerbacks coach	Positions created	D. K. McDonald
Scott Fuchs	Offensive line coach	Accepted job with the Tennessee Titans	Daryl Agpalsa

=== Starters lost ===
Starters are based on starters from the final game of the 2023 season. Players listed below have run out of eligibility. In total, the Jayhawks had 8 players run out of eligibility.

Name	Position
Jason Bean	QB
Mike Novitsky	OL
Dominick Puni	OL
Mason Fairchild	TE
Kenny Logan	S
Craig Young	S
Rich Miller	LB
Hayden Hatcher	DE

=== Entered NFL draft ===
Below are players who had remaining eligibility but instead of returning or transferring, chose to enter the 2024 NFL draft.

Name	Position
Austin Booker	DE
Kwinton Lassiter	CB

=== Recruiting ===
Website	4 star recruits	3 star recruits	Total recruits	Overall rank	Big 12 rank
247 Sports	3	13	16	46	6
Rivals	3	12	15	49	6*

*Rivals does not include the new teams joining the Big 12 and does include the teams leaving the Big 12, however, their ranks in the overall rankings are being factored into the rank for Kansas.

The Jayhawks received a commitment from their highest rated recruit ever, who was ranked 67th nationally among all recruits.

Highest rated recruit

College recruiting
Name	Hometown	School	Height	Weight	Commit date
Deshawn Warner; DE	Goodyear, AZ	Desert Edge	6 ft 4 in (1.93 m)	225 lb (102 kg)	Jul 1, 2023
Deshawn Warner; DE	Recruit ratings: Rivals: 247Sports: ESPN: (79)				

== Preseason ==
=== Big 12 media poll ===
The preseason poll was released on July 2, 2024.

Big 12
Predicted finish	Team	Votes (1st place)
1	Utah	906 (20)
2	Kansas State	889 (19)
3	Oklahoma State	829 (14)
4	Kansas	772 (5)
5	Arizona	762 (3)
6	Iowa State	661
7	West Virginia	581
8	UCF	551
9	Texas Tech	532
10	TCU	436
11	Colorado	400
12	Baylor	268
13	BYU	215
14	Cincinnati	196
15	Houston	157
16	Arizona State	141

- First place votes in ()

== Schedule ==
Date	Time	Opponent	Rank	Site	TV	Result	Attendance
August 29	7:00 p.m.	Lindenwood*	No. 22	Children's Mercy Park; Kansas City, KS	ESPN+	W 48–3	20,829
September 7	6:00 p.m.	at Illinois*	No. 19	Memorial Stadium; Champaign, IL	FS1	L 17–23	60,670
September 13	6:00 p.m.	UNLV*		Children's Mercy Park; Kansas City, KS	ESPN	L 20–23	21,493
September 21	11:00 a.m.	at West Virginia		Milan Puskar Stadium; Morgantown, WV	ESPN2	L 28–32	52,428
September 28	2:30 p.m.	TCU		Arrowhead Stadium; Kansas City, MO	ESPN+	L 27–38	47,928
October 5	7:00 p.m.	at Arizona State		Mountain America Stadium; Tempe, AZ	ESPN2	L 31–35	54,639
October 19	2:30 p.m.	Houston		Arrowhead Stadium; Kansas City, MO	ESPN+	W 42–14	38,619
October 26	7:00 p.m.	at No. 16 Kansas State		Bill Snyder Family Football Stadium; Manhattan, KS (Sunflower Showdown)	ESPN2	L 27–29	52,074
November 9	2:30 p.m.	No. 17 Iowa State		Arrowhead Stadium; Kansas City, MO	FS1	W 45–36	51,109
November 16	9:15 p.m.	at No. 6 BYU		LaVell Edwards Stadium; Provo, UT	ESPN	W 17–13	62,704
November 23	2:30 p.m.	No. 16 Colorado		Arrowhead Stadium; Kansas City, MO	FOX	W 37–21	56,470
November 30	11:00 a.m.	at Baylor		McLane Stadium; Waco, TX	ESPN2	L 17–45	36,585
*Non-conference game; Rankings from AP Poll (and CFP Rankings, after October 30) - Released prior to game; All times are in Central time

== Game summaries ==
=== vs. Lindenwood (FCS) ===
Game One – Lindenwood Lions (FCS) (0-0) vs No. 22 Kansas Jayhawks (0-0) – Game summary

Quarter	1	2	3	4	Total
Lions (FCS)	0	0	0	3	3
No. 22 Jayhawks	7	7	27	7	48

at Children's Mercy Park, Kansas City, Kansas

- Date: Thursday, August 29, 2024
- Game time: 7:00 PM CST
- Game weather: 84 °F (29 °C)
- Game attendance: 20,829
- Referee: Luke Richmond
- TV announcers (ESPN+): Shawn Kenney (play-by-play) and Taylor McHargue (analyst)

Game information

First quarter

- (09:44) KU – Devin Neal 5-yard run, Tabor Allen kick (Drive: 9 plays, 65 yards, 3:55; Kansas 7–0)

Second quarter

- (10:11) KU – Devin Neal 1-yard run, Tabor Allen kick (Drive: 7 plays, 85 yards, 3:23; Kansas 14–0)
- (08:42) KU – Mello Dotson 33-yard Interception Return, Tabor Allen PAT failed (Drive: 3 plays, 2 yards, 1:29; Kansas 20–0)
- (07:07) KU – Luke Grimm 58-yard pass from Jalon Daniels, Tabor Allen kick (Drive: 3 plays, 66 yards, 0:51; Kansas 27–0)
- (00:04) KU – Daniel Hishaw Jr 1-yard run, Tabor Allen kick (Drive: 7 plays, 95 yards, 3:00; Kansas 34–0)

Third quarter

- (08:23) KU – Sevion Morrison 1-yard run, Tabor Allen kick (Drive: 11 plays, 85 yards, 6:32; Kansas 41–0)

Fourth quarter

- (13:22) KU – Doug Emilien 4-yard pass from Cole Ballard, Tabor Allen kick (Drive: 11 plays, 90 yards, 5:39; Kansas 48–0)
- (06:12) LIN – Logan Seibert 34-yard field goal (Drive: 14 plays, 75 yards, 7:04; Kansas 48–3)

Statistics	LIN	KU
First downs	12	26
Total yards	202	530
Rushing yards	75	331
Passing yards	127	199
Passing: Comp–Att–Int	18–31–1	14–21–1
Time of possession	28:58	31:02

Team	Category	Player	Statistics
Lindenwood	Passing	Nate Glantz	18/31, 127 yards, INT
Lindenwood	Rushing	Steve Hall	7 carries, 26 yards
Lindenwood	Receiving	Abe Haerr	4 receptions, 58 yards
Kansas	Passing	Jalon Daniels	9/15, 148 yards, TD, INT
Kansas	Rushing	Devin Neal	8 carries, 112 yards, 2 TDs
Kansas	Receiving	Luke Grimm	6 receptions, 111 yards, TD

=== at Illinois ===
No. 19 Kansas Jayhawks (1-0) at Illinois Fighting Illini (1-0)

Quarter	1	2	3	4	Total
No. 19 Jayhawks	0	10	7	0	17
Fighting Illini	3	10	0	10	23

at Memorial Stadium • Champaign, Illinois

- Date: Saturday, September 7, 2024
- Game time: 6:00 p.m.
- Game attendance: 60,670
- Referee: David Alvarez
- TV announcers (FS1/ESPN Radio): Alex Faust (play-by-play) and Robert Smith (analyst)/Mike Couzens (play-by-play), Jordan Reid (analyst), and Mike Peasley (sideline)

Game information

First quarter

- (3:35) ILL – David Olano 23-yard field goal (Drive: 14 plays, 62 yards, 7:35; Illinois 3–0)

Second quarter

- (12:39) KAN – Tabor Allen 29-yard field goal (Drive: 10 plays, 64 yards, 5:56; Tied 3–3)
- (3:32) KAN – Luke Grimm 3-yard pass from Jalon Daniels, Tabor Allen kick (Drive: 7 plays, 81 yards, 3:05; Kansas 10–3)
- (1:05) ILL – David Olano 50-yard field goal (Drive: 7 plays, 43 yards, 2:27; Kansas 10–6)
- (0:36) ILL – Xavier Scott 30-yard interception, David Olano kick (Illinois 13–10)

Third quarter

- (4:57) KAN – Lawrence Arnold 13-yard pass from Jalon Daniels, Tabor Allen kick (Drive: 14 plays, 81 yards, 8:17; Kansas 17–13)

Fourth quarter

- (9:34) ILL – Kaden Feagin 1-yard run, David Olano kick (Drive: 8 plays, 80 yards, 3:54; Illinois 20–17)
- (0:58) ILL – David Olano 43-yard field goal (Drive: 15 plays, 42 yards, 6:46; Illinois 23–17)

Statistics	KU	ILL
First downs	18	14
Total yards	65–327	59–271
Rushing yards	33–186	34–79
Passing yards	141	192
Passing: Comp–Att–Int	18–32–3	16–25–0
Time of possession	29:22	30:38

Team	Category	Player	Statistics
Kansas	Passing	Jalon Daniels	18/32, 141 yards, 2 TD, 3 INT
Kansas	Rushing	Devin Neal	14 carries, 101 yards
Kansas	Receiving	Lawrence Arnold	4 receptions, 44 yards, 1 TD
Illinois	Passing	Luke Altmyer	16/25, 192 yards
Illinois	Rushing	Kaden Feagin	16 carries, 40 yards, 1 TD
Illinois	Receiving	Zakhari Franklin	9 receptions, 99 yards

=== UNLV ===
UNLV Rebels (2–0) at Kansas Jayhawks (1–1)

Quarter	1	2	3	4	Total
Rebels	3	10	3	7	23
Jayhawks	7	10	3	0	20

at Children's Mercy Park • Kansas City, Kansas

- Date: Friday, September 13, 2024
- Game time: 6:00 p.m.
- Game attendance: 21,493
- Referee: Mike McCabe
- TV announcers (ESPN): Anish Shroff (play-by-play), Andre Ware (analyst), and Paul Carcaterra (sideline)

Game information

First quarter

- (6:22) KAN – Jalon Daniels 11-yard run, Tabor Allen kick (Drive: 12 plays, 81 yards, 7:16; Kansas 7–0)
- (1:33) UNLV – Caden Chittenden 38-yard field goal (Drive: 11 plays, 55 yards, 4:49; Kansas 7–3)

Second quarter

- (12:12) KAN – Jalon Daniels 33-yard run, Tabor Allen kick (Drive: 8 plays, 94 yards, 4:10; Kansas 14–3)
- (6:19) UNLV – Caden Chittenden 27-yard field goal (Drive: 12 plays, 66 yards, 5:53; Kansas 14–6)
- (3:17) KAN – Tabor Allen 35-yard field goal (Drive: 7 plays, 58 yards, 3:02; Kansas 17–6)
- (0:00) UNLV – Jai'Den Thomas 27-yard pass from Matthew Sluka, Caden Chittenden kick (Drive: 2 plays, 33 yards, 0:31; Kansas 17–13)

Third quarter

- (9:38) UNLV – Caden Chittenden 23-yard field goal (Drive: 4 plays, -1 yards, 1:22; Kansas 17–16)

Fourth quarter

- (11:22) KAN – Tabor Allen 41-yard field goal (Drive: 13 plays, 75 yards, 5:44; Kansas 20–16)
- (2:00) UNLV – Kylin James 1-yard run, Caden Chittenden kick (Drive: 18 plays, 75 yards, 9:22; UNLV 23–20)

Statistics	UNLV	KU
First downs	17	17
Total yards	65–267	59–352
Rushing yards	47–181	35–199
Passing yards	86	153
Passing: Comp–Att–Int	7–18–0	12–24–2
Time of possession	31:06	28:54

Team	Category	Player	Statistics
UNLV	Passing	Matthew Sluka	7/18, 86 yards, TD
UNLV	Rushing	Matthew Sluka	19 carries, 124 yards
UNLV	Receiving	Jaden Bradley	1 reception, 31 yards
Kansas	Passing	Jalon Daniels	12/24, 153 yards, 2 INT
Kansas	Rushing	Devin Neal	23 carries, 120 yards
Kansas	Receiving	Lawrence Arnold	4 receptions, 58 yards

=== at West Virginia ===
Kansas Jayhawks (1–2) at West Virginia Mountaineers (1–2)

Quarter	1	2	3	4	Total
Jayhawks	0	7	14	7	28
Mountaineers	7	7	3	15	32

at Milan Puskar Stadium • Morgantown, West Virginia

- Date: Saturday, September 21, 2024
- Game time: 11:00 a.m.
- Game weather: Cloudy • Temperature: 80 °F (27 °C) • Wind: SW 6 mph
- Game attendance: 52,428
- Referee: Kevin Mar
- TV announcers (ESPN2): Brian Custer (play-by-play), Rod Gilmore (analyst), and Lauren Sisler (sideline)
- Box Score

Game information
First quarter
- (5:16) WVU – Jahiem White 1-yard run, Michael Hayes II kick (Drive: 3 plays, 78 yards, 1:10; West Virginia 7–0.)

Second quarter

- (7:31) KAN – Devin Neal 11-yard run, Tabor Allen kick (Drive: 13 plays, 83 yards, 6:16; Tied 7–7.)
- (0:25) WVU – Garrett Greene 5-yard run, Michael Hayes II kick (Drive: 8 plays, 34 yards, 1:17; West Virginia 14–7.)

Third quarter

- (9:08) KAN – Luke Grimm 7-yard pass from Jalon Daniels, Tabor Allen kick (Drive: 10 plays, 75 yards, 5:52; Tied 14–14.)
- (7:03) WVU – Michael Hayes II 40-yard field goal (Drive: 5 plays, 53 yards, 2:05; West Virginia 17–14.)
- (4:30) KAN – Daniel Hishaw 11-yard run, Tabor Allen kick (Drive: 5 plays, 75 yards, 2:33; Kansas 21–17.)

Fourth quarter

- (5:39) KAN – Luke Grimm 32-yard run, Tabor Allen kick (Drive: 6 plays, 54 yards, 3:40; Kansas 28–17.)
- (3:27) WVU – Kole Taylor 8-yard pass from Garrett Greene, Kole Taylor pass (Drive: 9 plays, 75 yards, 2:12; Kansas 28–25.)
- (0:26) WVU – Rodney Gallagher III 15-yard pass from Garrett Greene, Michael Hayes II kick (Drive: 7 plays, 67 yards, 1:56; West Virginia 32–28.)

Statistics	KU	WVU
First downs	25	23
Total yards	72–431	63–443
Rushing yards	47–247	33–148
Passing yards	184	295
Passing: Comp–Att–Int	15–25–1	15–30–2
Time of possession	36:47	23:13

Team	Category	Player	Statistics
Kansas	Passing	Jalon Daniels	15/25, 184 yds, TD, INT
Kansas	Rushing	Devin Neal	27 rushes, 110 yds, TD
Kansas	Receiving	Luke Grimm	6 receptions, 75 yds, TD
West Virginia	Passing	Garrett Greene	15/30, 295 yds, 2 TD, 2 INT
West Virginia	Rushing	Garrett Greene	17 rushes, 87 yds, TD
West Virginia	Receiving	Hudson Clement	7 receptions, 150 yds

=== TCU ===
TCU Horned Frogs (2–2) at Kansas Jayhawks (1–3)

Quarter	1	2	3	4	Total
Horned Frogs	7	14	7	10	38
Jayhawks	14	3	7	3	27

at Arrowhead Stadium • Kansas City, Missouri

- Date: Saturday, September 28, 2024
- Game time: 2:30 p.m.
- Game weather: Sunny • Temperature: 81 °F (27 °C) • Wind: N 16 mph
- Game attendance: 47,928
- Referee: Michael VanderVelde
- TV announcers (ESPN+): Lowell Galindo (play-by-play), Fozzy Whittaker (analyst), and Shane Sparks (sideline)

Game information

First quarter

- (10:18) KAN – Luke Grimm 15-yard pass from Jalon Daniels, Tabor Allen kick (Drive: 4 plays, 54 yards, 2:02; Kansas 7–0)
- (8:29) TCU – Jack Bech 35-yard pass from Josh Hoover, Kyle Lemmermann kick (Drive: 5 plays, 92 yards, 1:47; Tied 7–7)
- (3:59) KAN – Devin Neal 2-yard run, Tabor Allen kick (Drive: 10 plays, 71 yards, 4:25; Kansas 14–7)

Second quarter

- (13:59) TCU – Cam Cook 3-yard run, Kyle Lemmermann kick (Drive: 12 plays, 75 yards, 5:10; Tied 14–14)
- (2:57) KAN – Tabor Allen 24-yard field goal (Drive: 4 plays, 0 yards, 0:58; Kansas 17–14)
- (0:17) TCU – Jack Bech 7-yard pass from Josh Hoover, Kyle Lemmermann kick (Drive: 11 plays, 75 yards, 2:40; TCU 21–17)

Third quarter

- (8:58) KAN – Daniel Hishaw 8-yard run, Tabor Allen kick (Drive: 11 plays, 75 yards, 6:02; Kansas 24–21)
- (1:46) TCU – JP Richardson 89-yard punt return, Kyle Lemmermann kick (TCU 28–24)

Fourth quarter

- (12:07) KAN – Tabor Allen 41-yard field goal (Drive: 10 plays, 42 yards, 4:39; TCU 28–27)
- (11:20) TCU – Eric McAlister 59-yard pass from Josh Hoover, Kyle Lemmermann kick (Drive: 2 plays, 75 yards, 0:47; TCU 35–27)
- (3:02) TCU – Kyle Lemmermann 29-yard field goal (Drive: 12 plays, 57 yards, 6:07; TCU 38–27)

Statistics	TCU	KU
First downs	26	20
Total yards	72–507	68–346
Rushing yards	35–151	34–167
Passing yards	356	179
Passing: Comp–Att–Int	28–37–2	15–34–1
Time of possession	28:24	31:36

Team	Category	Player	Statistics
TCU	Passing	Josh Hoover	28/37, 356 yards, 3 TD, 2 INT
TCU	Rushing	Jeremy Payne	8 carries, 65 yards
TCU	Receiving	Jack Bech	10 receptions, 131 yards, 2 TD
Kansas	Passing	Jalon Daniels	15/34, 179 yards, TD, INT
Kansas	Rushing	Daniel Hishaw	13 carries, 85 yards, TD
Kansas	Receiving	Luke Grimm	6 receptions, 85 yards, TD

=== at Arizona State ===
Kansas Jayhawks (1–4) at Arizona State Sun Devils (3–1)

Quarter	1	2	3	4	Total
Jayhawks	7	7	3	14	31
Sun Devils	7	7	0	21	35

at Mountain America Stadium • Tempe, Arizona

- Date: Saturday, October 5, 2024
- Game time: 7:00 p.m.
- Game attendance: 54,639
- Referee: Marvel July
- TV announcers (ESPN2): Brian Custer (play-by-play), Rod Gilmore (analyst), and Lauren Sisler (sideline)

Game information

First quarter

- ASU – Xavier Guillory 28-yard pass from Sam Leavitt (Ian Hershey kick), 11:48. Sun Devils 7–0. Drive: 7 plays, 75 yards, 3:12.
- KAN – Jalon Daniels 22-yard run (Luke Hosford kick), 6:30. Tied 7–7. Drive: 10 plays, 75 yards, 5:18.

Second quarter

- KAN – Quentin Skinner 30-yard pass from Jalon Daniels (Luke Hosford kick), 11:50. Jayhawks 14–7. Drive: 10 plays, 85 yards, 5:03.
- ASU – Chamon Metayer 20-yard pass from Sam Leavitt (Carston Kieffer kick), 1:33. Tied 14–14. Drive: 4 plays, 58 yards, 0:52.

Third quarter

- KAN – Tabor Allen 20-yard field goal, 10:04. Jayhawks 17–14. Drive: 13 plays, 73 yards, 4:56.

Fourth quarter

- ASU – Cam Skattebo 1-yard run (Carston Kieffer kick), 14:56. Sun Devils 21–17. Drive: 10 plays, 52 yards, 5:21.
- KAN – Devin Neal 31-yard run (Luke Hosford kick), 10:49. Jayhawks 24–21. Drive: 8 plays, 75 yards, 4:07.
- ASU – Jordyn Tyson 31-yard pass from Sam Leavitt (Carston Kieffer kick), 6:19. Sun Devils 28–24. Drive: 10 plays, 75 yards, 4:30.
- KAN – Quentin Skinner 34-yard pass from Jalon Daniels (Luke Hosford kick), 2:04. Jayhawks 31–28. Drive: 7 plays, 69 yards, 4:09.
- ASU – Jordyn Tyson 3-yard pass from Sam Leavitt (Carston Kieffer kick), 0:16. Sun Devils 35–31. Drive: 8 plays, 75 yards, 1:48.

Statistics	KU	ASU
First downs	23	28
Total yards	64–411	70–485
Rushing yards	33–151	45–313
Passing yards	260	172
Passing: Comp–Att–Int	18–31–0	15–25–1
Time of possession	30:41	29:19

Team	Category	Player	Statistics
Kansas	Passing	Jalon Daniels	18/31, 260 yards, 2 TD
Kansas	Rushing	Devin Neal	14 carries, 71 yards, TD
Kansas	Receiving	Quentin Skinner	6 receptions, 130 yards, 2 TD
Arizona State	Passing	Sam Leavitt	14/24, 157 yards, 4 TD, INT
Arizona State	Rushing	Cam Skattebo	25 carries, 186 yards, TD
Arizona State	Receiving	Jordyn Tyson	6 receptions, 76 yards, 2 TD

=== Houston ===
Houston Cougars (2–4) at Kansas Jayhawks (1–5)

Quarter	1	2	3	4	Total
Cougars	0	14	0	0	14
Jayhawks	14	14	0	14	42

at Arrowhead Stadium • Kansas City, Missouri

- Date: Saturday, October 19, 2024
- Game time: 2:30 p.m.
- Game weather: Sunny • Temperature: 75 °F (24 °C) • Wind: SW 9 miles per hour (14 km/h)
- Game attendance: 38,619
- Referee: Tutashinda Salaam
- TV announcers (ESPN+): Mark Neely (play-by-play), Todd Doxzon (analyst), and Kelly Crull (sideline)

Game information

First quarter

- (5:56) KAN – Jared Casey 2-yard pass from Jalon Daniels, Tabor Allen kick (Drive: 15 plays, 71 yards, 8:59; Kansas 7–0)
- (2:37) KAN – Quentin Skinner 48-yard pass from Jalon Daniels, Tabor Allen kick (Drive: 1 play, 48 yards, 0:09; Kansas 14–0)

Second quarter

- (10:59) KAN – Devin Neal 2-yard run, Tabor Allen kick (Drive: 6 plays, 84 yards, 3:19; Kansas 21–0)
- (6:18) HOU – Stacy Sneed 23-yard pass from Donovan Smith, Jack Martin kick (Drive: 9 plays, 66 yards, 4:34; Kansas 21–7)
- (3:33) KAN – Jared Casey 3-yard pass from Jalon Daniels, Tabor Allen kick (Drive: 7 plays, 75 yards, 2:45; Kansas 28–7)
- (1:35) HOU – Stacy Sneed 23-yard pass from Donovan Smith, Jack Martin kick (Drive: 5 plays, 75 yards, 1:58; Kansas 28–14)

Third quarter

No scoring plays

Fourth quarter

- (14:21) KAN – Jalon Daniels 8-yard run, Tabor Allen kick (Drive: 8 plays, 87 yards, 4:56; Kansas 35–14)
- (6:50) KAN – Devin Neal 5-yard run, Tabor Allen kick (Drive: 3 plays, 70 yards, 1:36; Kansas 42–14)

Statistics	HOU	KU
First downs	20	21
Total yards	65–335	54–467
Rushing yards	32–98	33–220
Passing yards	237	247
Passing: Comp–Att–Int	21–33–4	16–21–0
Time of possession	31:41	28:19

Team	Category	Player	Statistics
Houston	Passing	Donovan Smith	15/24, 173 yards, 2 TD, 3 INT
Houston	Rushing	Donovan Smith	14 carries, 45 yards
Houston	Receiving	Mekhi Mews	6 receptions, 99 yards, TD
Kansas	Passing	Jalon Daniels	16/21, 247 yards, 3 TD
Kansas	Rushing	Devin Neal	17 carries, 108 yards, 2 TD
Kansas	Receiving	Lawrence Arnold	4 receptions, 80 yards

=== at No. 16 Kansas State (Sunflower Showdown) ===
Kansas Jayhawks (2–5) at No. 16 Kansas State Wildcats (6–1)

Quarter	1	2	3	4	Total
Jayhawks	7	7	13	0	27
No. 16 Wildcats	0	16	7	6	29

at Bill Snyder Family Football Stadium • Manhattan, Kansas

- Date: Saturday, October 26, 2024
- Game time: 7:00 p.m.
- Game weather: Clear • Temperature: 63 °F (17 °C) • Wind: E 7 miles per hour (11 km/h)
- Game attendance: 52,074
- Referee: Mike McCabe
- TV announcers (ESPN2): Roy Philpott (play-by-play), Sam Acho (analyst), and Taylor Davis (sideline)

Game information

First quarter

- (8:51) KAN – Sevion Morrison 38-yard run, Tabor Allen kick. (Drive: 11 plays, 75 yards, 6:09; Kansas 7–0)

Second quarter

- (11:09) KSU – Will Anciaux 24-yard pass from Avery Johnson, Chris Tennant kick. (Drive: 13 plays, 95 yards, 6:35; Tied 7–7)
- (11:02) KSU – Team Safety. (Drive: 1 play, 0 yards, 0:06; Kansas State 9–7)
- (7:13) KSU – Garrett Oakley 2-yard pass from Avery Johnson, Chris Tennant kick. (Drive: 8 plays, 59 yards, 3:43; Kansas State 16–7)
- (3:29) KAN – Luke Grimm 10-yard pass from Jalon Daniels, Tabor Allen kick. (Drive: 6 plays, 75 yards, 3:44; Kansas State 16–14)

Third quarter

- (13:15) KSU – Avery Johnson 10-yard run, Chris Tennant kick. (Drive: 4 plays, 75 yards, 1:45; Kansas State 23–14)
- (8:54) KAN – Devin Neal 24-yard run, Tabor Allen kick no good. (Drive: 9 plays, 65 yards, 4:21; Kansas State 23–20)
- (0:36) KAN – Jalon Daniels 8-yard run, Tabor Allen kick. (Drive: 3 plays, 54 yards, 1:31; Kansas 27–23)

Fourth quarter

- (13:23) KSU – Chris Tennant 28-yard field goal. (Drive: 7 plays, 66 yards, 2:13; Kansas 27–26)
- (1:42) KSU – Chris Tennant 51-yard field goal. (Drive: 7 plays, 15 yards, 2:02; Kansas State 29–27)

Statistics	KU	KSU
First downs	23	22
Total yards	401	479
Rushing yards	192	226
Passing yards	209	253
Passing: Comp–Att–Int	18–31–1	19–34–0
Time of possession	27:40	32:20

Team	Category	Player	Statistics
Kansas	Passing	Jalon Daniels	18/39, 209 yards, 1 TD, 1 INT
Kansas	Rushing	Jalon Daniels	15 carries, 66 yards, 1 TD
Kansas	Receiving	Trevor Wilson	4 receptions, 69 yards
Kansas State	Passing	Avery Johnson	19/34, 253 yards, 2 TD
Kansas State	Rushing	DJ Giddens	18 carries, 102 yards
Kansas State	Receiving	Jayce Brown	5 receptions, 98 yards

=== No. 17 Iowa State ===
No. 17 Iowa State Cyclones (7–1) at Kansas Jayhawks (2–6)

Quarter	1	2	3	4	Total
No. 17 Cyclones	7	6	7	16	36
Jayhawks	14	17	7	7	45

at Arrowhead Stadium • Kansas City, Missouri

- Date: Saturday, November 9, 2024
- Game time: 8:00 p.m.
- Game weather: Sunny • Temperature: 59 °F (15 °C) • Wind: S 10 miles per hour (16 km/h)
- Game attendance: 51,109
- Referee: Michael VanderVelde
- TV announcers (FS1): Guy Haberman (play-by-play) and Yogi Roth (analyst)

Game information

First quarter

- (9:02) ISU – Jaylin Noel 27-yard pass from Rocco Becht, Kyle Konrardy kick. (Drive: 7 plays, 99 yards, 3:38; Iowa State 7–0)
- (8:13) KAN – Luke Grimm 70-yard pass from Jalon Daniels, Tabor Allen kick.(Drive: 2 plays, 74 yards, 0:43; Tied 7–7)
- (0:19) KAN – Devin Neal 13-yard run, Tabor Allen kick. (Drive: 8 plays, 90 yards, 4:04; Kansas 14–7)

Second quarter

- (10:32) KAN – Quentin Skinner 24-yard pass from Jalon Daniels, Tabor Allen kick. (Drive: 6 plays, 73 yards, 3:01; Kansas 21–7)
- (7:06) ISU – Kyle Konrardy 22-yard field goal. (Drive: 10 plays, 71 yards, 3:26; Kansas 21–10)
- (4:43) KAN – Jalon Daniels 2-yard run, Tabor Allen kick. (Drive: 5 plays, 76 yards, 2:16; Kansas 28–10)
- (1:01) KAN – Tabor Allen 47-yard field goal. (Drive: 9 plays, 32 yards, 2:46; Kansas 31–10)
- (0:00) ISU – Kyle Konrardy 38-yard field goal. (Drive: 9 plays, 55 yards, 1:01; Kansas 31–13)

Third quarter

- (6:27) KAN – Devin Neal 10-yard run, Tabor Allen kick. (Drive: 11 plays, 59 yards, 5:39; Kansas 38–13)
- (4:06) ISU – Carson Hansen 11-yard run, Kyle Konrardy kick. (Drive: 5 plays, 75 yards, 2:21; Kansas 38–20)

Fourth quarter

- (11:03) ISU – Jaylon Jackson 27-yard pass from Rocco Becht, Rocco Becht run. (Drive: 6 plays, 80 yards, 1:48; Kansas 38–28)
- (5:58) KAN – Mello Dotson 25-yard interception, Tabor Allen kick. (Kansas 45–28)
- (2:41) ISU – Jaylin Noel 18-yard pass from Rocco Becht, Jayden Higgins pass. (Drive: 3 plays, 42 yards, 0:42; Kansas 45–36)

Statistics	ISU	KU
First downs	24	25
Total yards	461	532
Rushing yards	78	237
Passing yards	383	295
Passing: Comp–Att–Int	24–38–1	12–24–0
Time of possession	24:43	35:17

Team	Category	Player	Statistics
Iowa State	Passing	Rocco Becht	24/37, 383 yards, 3 TD, 1 INT
Iowa State	Rushing	Carson Hansen	8 carries, 48 yards, 1 TD
Iowa State	Receiving	Jaylin Noel	8 receptions, 167 yards, 2 TD
Kansas	Passing	Jalon Daniels	12/24, 295 yards, 2 TD
Kansas	Rushing	Devin Neal	18 carries, 116 yards, 2 TD
Kansas	Receiving	Quentin Skinner	4 receptions, 135 yards, 1 TD

=== at No. 6 BYU ===
Kansas Jayhawks (3–6) at No. 6 BYU Cougars (9–0)

Quarter	1	2	3	4	Total
Jayhawks	7	3	0	7	17
No. 6 Cougars	0	10	3	0	13

at LaVell Edwards Stadium • Provo, Utah

- Date: Saturday, November 16, 2024
- Game time: 9:15 p.m.
- Game weather: Cloudy • Temperature: 33 °F (1 °C) • Wind: S 3 miles per hour (4.8 km/h)
- Game attendance: 62,704
- Referee: David Alvarez
- TV announcers (ESPN): Mark Jones (play-by-play), Roddy Jones (analyst), and Quint Kessenich (sideline)

Game information

First quarter

- (9:07) KAN – Devin Neal 8-yard run, Tabor Allen kick. (Drive: 10 plays, 84 yards, 5:49; Kansas 7–0)

Second quarter

- (14:11) BYU – Will Ferrin 33-yard field goal. (Drive: 11 plays, 42 yards, 5:30; Kansas 7–3)
- (8:48) BYU – Hinckley Ropati 30-yard pass from Jake Retzlaff, Will Ferrin kick. (Drive: 8 plays, 69 yards, 4:31; BYU 10–7)
- (1:46) KAN – Tabor Allen 25-yard field goal. (Drive:11 plays, 68 yards, 7:02; Tied 10–10)

Third quarter

- (4:30) BYU – Will Ferrin 35-yard field goal. (Drive: 17 plays, 66 yards, 10:26; BYU 13–10)

Fourth quarter

- (13:19) KAN – Devin Neal 3-yard run, Tabor Allen kick. (Drive: 1 play, 3 yards, 0:04; Kansas 17–13)

Statistics	KU	BYU
First downs	13	23
Total yards	242	354
Rushing yards	73	162
Passing yards	169	192
Passing: Comp–Att–Int	12–19–1	18–29–1
Time of possession	28:57	31:03

Team	Category	Player	Statistics
Kansas	Passing	Jalon Daniels	12/19, 169 yards, INT
Kansas	Rushing	Devin Neal	14 carries, 52 yards, 2 TD
Kansas	Receiving	Luke Grimm	4 receptions, 77 yards
BYU	Passing	Jake Retzlaff	18/28, 192 yards, TD, INT
BYU	Rushing	LJ Martin	15 carries, 76 yards
BYU	Receiving	Chase Roberts	5 receptions, 71 yards

=== No. 16 Colorado ===
No. 16 Colorado Buffaloes (8–2) at Kansas Jayhawks (4–6)

Quarter	1	2	3	4	Total
No. 16 Buffaloes	0	14	7	0	21
Jayhawks	10	13	7	7	37

at Arrowhead Stadium • Kansas City, Missouri

- Date: Saturday, November 23, 2024
- Game time: 2:30 p.m. CDT
- Game weather: Sunny • Temperature: 58 °F (14 °C) • Wind: SE 9 miles per hour (14 km/h)
- Game attendance: 56,470
- Referee: Kevin Mar
- TV announcers (FOX): Jason Benetti (play-by-play), Brock Huard (analyst), and Allison Williams (sideline)

Game information

First quarter

- (11:44) KAN – Devin Neal 51-yard pass from Jalon Daniels, Tabor Allen kick (Drive: 6 plays, 73 yards, 3:11; Kansas 7–0)
- (2:39) KAN – Tabor Allen 24-yard field goal (Drive: 13 plays, 61 yards, 7:46; Kansas 10–0)

Second quarter

- (9:02) KAN – Devin Neal 9-yard run, Tabor Allen kick (Drive: 8 plays, 61 yards, 4:44; Kansas 17–0)
- (7:18) COLO – Travis Hunter 51-yard pass from Shedeur Sanders, Alejandro Mata kick (Drive: 4 plays, 75 yards, 1:44; Kansas 17–7)
- (3:47) KAN – Tabor Allen 23-yard field goal (Drive: 8 plays, 69 yards, 3:27; Kansas 20–7)
- (1:51) COLO – Drelon Miller 19-yard pass from Shedeur Sanders, Alejandro Mata kick (Drive: 5 plays, 75 yards, 1:56; Kansas 20–14)
- (0:07) KAN – Tabor Allen 25-yard field goal (Drive: 12 plays, 73 yards, 1:39; Kansas 23–14)

Third quarter

- (11:59) COLO – Travis Hunter 26-yard pass from Shedeur Sanders, Alejandro Mata kick (Drive: 6 plays, 51 yards, 2:53; Kansas 23–21)
- (7:18) KAN – Devin Neal 1-yard run, Tabor Allen kick (Drive: 10 plays, 80 yards, 4:36; Kansas 30–21)

Fourth quarter

- (11:47) KAN – Devin Neal 2-yard run, Tabor Allen kick (Drive: 14 plays, 70 yards, 8:07; Kansas 37–21)

Statistics	COLO	KU
First downs	15	26
Total yards	308	520
Rushing yards	42	331
Passing yards	266	189
Passing: Comp–Att–Int	23–29–0	14–21–0
Time of possession	19:49	40:11

Team	Category	Player	Statistics
Colorado	Passing	Shedeur Sanders	23/29, 266 yards, 3 TD
Colorado	Rushing	Shedeur Sanders	4 carries, 26 yards
Colorado	Receiving	Travis Hunter	8 receptions, 125 yards, 2 TD
Kansas	Passing	Jalon Daniels	14/21, 189 yards, TD
Kansas	Rushing	Devin Neal	37 carries, 207 yards, 3 TD
Kansas	Receiving	Devin Neal	4 receptions, 80 yards, TD

=== at Baylor ===
Kansas Jayhawks (5–6) at Baylor Bears (7–4)

Quarter	1	2	3	4	Total
Jayhawks	7	3	7	0	17
Bears	7	14	21	3	45

at McLane Stadium • Waco, Texas

- Date: Saturday, November 30, 2024
- Game time: 11:00 a.m. CDT
- Game attendance: 36,585
- Referee: Kevin Boitmann
- TV announcers (ESPN2): Clay Matvick (play-by-play), Steve Addazio (analyst), and Tori Petry (sideline)

Game information

First quarter
Second quarter
Third quarter
Fourth quarter

Statistics	KU	BAY
First downs	19	32
Total yards	491	603
Rushing yards	211	293
Passing yards	280	310
Passing: Comp–Att–Int	12-23-2	23-31-0
Time of possession	25:36	50:58

Team	Category	Player	Statistics
Kansas	Passing	Jalon Daniels	12-23, 280 Yards, 2 INT
Kansas	Rushing	Devin Neal	20 Carries, 133 Yards, TD
Kansas	Receiving	Quentin Skinner	3 Receptions, 77 Yards
Baylor	Passing	Sawyer Robertson	23-31, 310 Yards, 4 TD
Baylor	Rushing	Bryson Washington	28 Carries, 192 Yards, 2 TD
Baylor	Receiving	Monaray Baldwin	7 Receptions, 119 Yards, 2 TD

== Roster ==
2024 Kansas Jayhawks football team roster
Players
Coaches
Offense

Pos.	#	Name	Class
WR	0	Quentin Skinner	Sr
WR	2	Lawrence Arnold	Sr
WR	3	Keaton Kubecka (injured)	Fr
RB	4	Devin Neal	Sr
WR	5	Doug Emilien	Jr
QB	6	Jalon Daniels	Jr
WR	7	Trevor Wilson	Sr
QB	8	Isaiah Marshall	Fr
RB	9	Daniel Hishaw Jr.	Jr
WR	11	Luke Grimm	Sr
RB	12	Torry Locklin	Sr
WR	13	Bryce Cohoon	Fr
QB	14	Mikey Pauley	So
QB	15	Cole Ballard	Fr
QB	16	Ben Easters	Jr
TE	17	Jaden Hamm	Fr
TE	18	DeShawn Hanika (injured)	Sr
QB	19	TJ Crews IV	Fr
RB	22	Micah Johnson	Fr
RB	25	Harry Stewart III	Fr
RB	26	Johnny Thompson Jr.	Fr
RB	28	Sevion Morrison	Jr
RB	30	Carson Morgan	Fr
RB	38	Jack Schneider	Fr
WR	41	Hunter Luke	Fr
TE	43	Max Muehlberger	So
TE	44	Carson Bruhn	Fr
TE	45	Trevor Kardell	Sr
TE	47	Jared Casey	Sr
OL	50	David Abajian (injured)	Fr
OL	52	Logan Brown	Jr
OL	53	Shane Bumgardner	Sr
OL	54	Michael Ford Jr.	Sr
OL	55	Darrell Simmons Jr.	Sr
OL	56	Amir Herring	Fr
OL	57	Hank Kelly	Jr
OL	58	Kael Farkes	So
OL	59	Nolan Gorczyca	Jr
OL	61	Bryce Foster	Jr
OL	65	Carter Lavrusky	Fr
OL	67	Eli Richmond	Fr
OL	69	Harrison Utley	Fr
OL	70	Kobe Baynes	Jr
OL	71	James Livingston	Fr
OL	72	Kene Anene	Fr
OL	73	Dre Doiron	Jr
OL	74	De'Kendrick Sterns	Jr
OL	75	Calvin Clements	Fr
OL	76	Myles Ewell	Fr
OL	77	Bryce Cabeldue	Sr
WR	80	Mack Moeller	Jr
TE	81	Quinton Conley	So
WR	82	Israel Moses V	Fr
WR	83	Grant Muffenbier	Fr
WR	84	Griffin Koch	So
WR	85	Jarred Sample	Fr
WR	86	Donald Collier	Fr
TE	87	Leyton Cure	Jr
TE	88	Tevita Ahoafi-Noa	Sr

Defense

Pos.	#	Name	Class
LB	1	J.B. Brown	Sr
CB	2	Cobee Bryant	Sr
CB	3	Mello Dotson	Sr
S	4	Marvin Grant	Sr
S	5	O.J. Burroughs	Sr
LB	6	Taiwan Berryhill Jr.	Sr
LB	10	Jayson Gilliom	Jr
S	11	Devin Dye	Jr
DE	13	Dylan Brooks (injured)	Jr
S	14	Jalen Dye	Jr
DE	15	DJ Warner	Fr
LB	16	Logan Brantley	Fr
CB	17	Austin Alexander	Fr
S	18	Damani Maxson	Fr
LB	19	Tristian Fletcher	Jr
CB	22	Brian Dilworth	So
S	23	Mason Ellis	So
CB	24	Damarius McGhee	Jr
S	25	Kaleb Purdy	So
CB	26	Jalen Todd	Fr
S	27	Taylor Davis	Fr
LB	28	JaCorey Stewart	Fr
CB	29	Jameel Croft Jr.	Fr
CB	30	Aundre Gibson	Fr
S	31	Landon Nelson	Jr
LB	32	Dylan Downing	Sr
LB	33	Jon Jon Kamara	Fr
LB	34	Alex Raich	Sr
CB	36	Jameer Moore	Fr
LB	39	Cole Mondi	Jr
S	40	Colter McDaniel	Fr
LB	41	Ezra Vedral	Fr
CB	43	Will Gavin	Jr
LB	44	Cornell Wheeler	Sr
DE	45	Dean Miller	Jr
DE	46	Bai Jobe	Fr
CB	47	Jacoby Davis	Fr
CB	49	Tyler Soukhot	Jr
DT	52	D.J. Withers	Jr
DT	53	Caleb Taylor	Sr
DE	55	Greydon Grimes	Fr
DT	56	Marcus Calvin	Fr
DT	58	Javier Derritt	Sr
DE	59	Jaydon Brittingham	Fr
DL	70	Jason Strickland	Fr
DT	71	Grady Seyfert	Fr
DE	90	Jereme Robinson	Sr
DE	91	Dakyus Brinkley	Fr
DT	92	Tommy Dunn Jr.	Jr
DT	94	Blake Herold	Fr
DE	95	Dylan Wudke	Sr
DE	96	Cole Petrus	So
DT	97	Kenean Caldwell	Jr
DT	98	Lance Bassett	Fr
DL	99	Ronald McGee	Sr

Special teams

Pos.	#	Name	Class
PK	34	Owen Piepergerdes	Jr
P	35	Damon Greaves	So
P	37	Grayden Addison	Jr
PK	40	Tabor Allen	Sr
LS	49	Hollis Moeller	Fr
LS	51	Emory Duggar	Jr
LS	60	Luke Hosford	Sr
PK	93	Charlie Weinrich	So

Head coach

- Lance Leipold

Coordinators/assistant coaches

- Jeff Grimes OC
- Jim Zebrowski Co–OC
- Brian Borland DC
- Chris Simpson LB
- D. K. McDonald Co-DC/CB
- Daryl Agpalsa OL
- Taiwo Onatolu DE/ST
- Jim Panagos DT
- Terrence Samuel WR
- Jonathan Wallace RB

Legend

- (C) Team captain
- (S) Suspended
- (I) Ineligible
- Injured
- Redshirt

Roster

== Rankings ==
Ranking movements Legend: ██ Increase in ranking ██ Decrease in ranking — = Not ranked RV = Received votes
	Week																
Poll	Pre	1	2	3	4	5	6	7	8	9	10	11	12	13	14	15	Final
AP	22	19	RV	—	—	—	—	—	—	—	—	—	—	—	—	—	—
Coaches	24	20	RV	—	—	—	—	—	—	—	—	—	—	—	—	—	—
CFP	Not released										—	—	—	—	—	—	Not released
