= 2024 Citrus Bowl (December) =

Postseason college football bowl game

2024 Cheez-It Citrus Bowl
- 79th Citrus Bowl
South Carolina Gamecocks	Illinois Fighting Illini
(9–3)	(9–3)
SEC	Big Ten
17	21
Head coach: Shane Beamer	Head coach: Bret Bielema
AP / Coaches / CFP; 14 / 14 / 15	AP / Coaches / CFP; 21 / 21 / 20
	1	2	3	4	Total
South Carolina	3	0	7	7	17
Illinois	7	0	7	7	21
- Date: December 31, 2024
- Season: 2024
- Stadium: Camping World Stadium
- Location: Orlando, Florida
- MVP: Josh McCray (RB, Illinois)
- Favorite: South Carolina by 9.5
- Referee: Kevin Mar (Big 12)
- Attendance: 47,129

United States TV coverage
- Network: ABC; ESPN Radio
- Announcers: Mark Jones (play-by-play), Roddy Jones (analyst), and Quint Kessenich (sideline) (ABC); Sean Kelley (play-by-play), Rene Ingoglia (analyst), and Marilyn Payne (sideline) (ESPN Radio)

The 2024 Citrus Bowl was a college football bowl game played on December 31, 2024, at Camping World Stadium in Orlando, Florida. The 79th annual Citrus Bowl featured Illinois from the Big Ten Conference and South Carolina from the Southeastern Conference (SEC). The game began at approximately 3:00 p.m. EST and aired on ABC. The Citrus Bowl was one of the 2024–25 bowl games concluding the 2024 FBS football season. Sponsored by Cheez-It, the game was officially known as the Cheez-It Citrus Bowl.

== Teams ==
Consistent with conference tie-ins, the game featured teams from the Big Ten Conference, and the Southeastern Conference (SEC). This was the first meeting between South Carolina and Illinois.

=== South Carolina Gamecocks ===
South Carolina played to a 9–3 overall record (5–3 in SEC play) during the regular season. After starting with a 3–3 record in their first six games, they finished with a six-game winning streak. The Gamecocks faced six ranked teams, losing to LSU, Ole Miss, and Alabama while defeating Texas A&M, Missouri, and Clemson. They entered the national rankings in mid-November, and entered the bowl placed 15th in the final College Football Playoff (CFP) rankings.

=== Illinois Fighting Illini ===
Illinois played to an overall regular-season record of 9–3 (6–3 in Big Ten play). After opening the season with four consecutive wins, the Fighting Illini suffered three defeats in five games, then ended with three wins in a row. Illinois faced five ranked opponents, defeating Kansas, Nebraska, and Michigan while losing to Penn State and Oregon. Ranked nationally for much of the season, the Fighting Illini entered the bowl placed 20th in the final CFP rankings.

== Game summary ==
2024 Citrus Bowl

Quarter	1	2	3	4	Total
No. 15 South Carolina	3	0	7	7	17
No. 20 Illinois	7	0	7	7	21

at Camping World Stadium • Orlando, Florida

- Date: Tuesday, December 31, 2024
- Game time: 3:05 p.m. EST
- Game weather: Cloudy • Temperature: 75 °F (24 °C) • Wind: 13 mph (21 km/h) southwest
- Game attendance: 47,129
- Referee: Kevin Mar
- TV announcers (ABC): Mark Jones (play-by-play), Roddy Jones (analyst), and Quint Kessenich (sideline)
- Box score

Scoring summary

Quarter	Time	Drive			Team	Scoring information	Score	
Quarter	Time	Plays	Yards	TOP	Team	Scoring information	SC	ILL
1	7:24	11	47	5:48	South Carolina	29-yard field goal by Alex Herrera	3	0
1	0:00	11	66	5:13	Illinois	Zakhari Franklin 15-yard touchdown reception from Luke Altmyer, David Olano kick good	3	7
3	10:50	5	58	1:24	South Carolina	Oscar Adaway III 36-yard touchdown run, Alex Herrera kick good	10	7
3	2:23	9	63	4:36	Illinois	Josh McCray 3-yard touchdown run, David Olano kick good	10	14
4	14:56	5	75	2:27	South Carolina	Joshua Simon 6-yard touchdown reception from LaNorris Sellers, Alex Herrera kick good	17	14
4	7:29	12	75	7:27	Illinois	Josh McCray 9-yard touchdown run, David Olano kick good	17	21
"TOP" = time of possession. For other American football terms, see Glossary of American football.							17	21

=== Statistics ===
Statistics	USC	ILL
First downs	20	22
Plays–yards	68–390	57–357
Rushes–yards	33–130	35–183
Passing yards	260	174
Passing: comp–att–int	24–35–0	13–22–1
Time of possession	31:16	28:44

Team	Category	Player	Statistics
South Carolina	Passing	LaNorris Sellers	24/34, 260 yards, TD
South Carolina	Rushing	Oscar Adaway III	14 carries, 69 yards, TD
South Carolina	Receiving	Joshua Simon	6 receptions, 69 yards, TD
Illinois	Passing	Luke Altmyer	13/22, 174 yards, TD, INT
Illinois	Rushing	Josh McCray	13 carries, 114 yards, 2 TD
Illinois	Receiving	Hank Beatty	4 receptions, 90 yards

== See also ==
- 2024 Cure Bowl, contested at the same venue eleven days earlier
- 2024 Pop-Tarts Bowl, contested at the same venue three days earlier
