= Josh McCray =

American football player (born 2002)

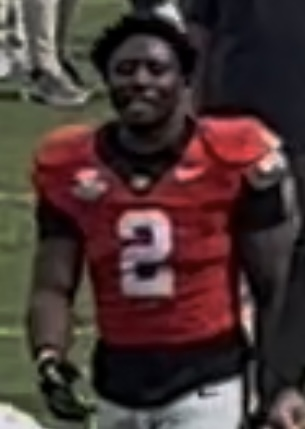
- McCray in 2025

San Diego Strike Force
- Position: Running back

Personal information
- Born: February 24, 2002 (age 24)
- Listed height: 5 ft 11 in (1.80 m)
- Listed weight: 250 lb (113 kg)

Career information
- High school: Enterprise (Enterprise, Alabama)
- College: Illinois (2021–2024); Georgia (2025)
- NFL draft: 2026: undrafted

Career history
- San Diego Strike Force (2027–present)
- Stats at ESPN

Joshua Javon McCray (born February 24, 2002) is an American professional football running back for the San Diego Strike Force of the Indoor Football League (IFL). He played college football for the Illinois Fighting Illini and Georgia Bulldogs.

== Early life ==
McCray attended Enterprise High School in Enterprise, Alabama. As a senior, he rushed for 774 yards and 11 touchdowns on 111 carries. A three-star recruit, he committed to play college football at the University of Illinois Urbana-Champaign.

== College career ==
As a true freshman, McCray recorded 112 carries for 549 yards, making an instant impact. He played in just four games the following season, dealing with injuries. After dealing with injuries during the 2023 season as well, McCray played in 13 games in 2024, totaling 117 carries for 609 yards and 10 touchdowns. In the 2024 Citrus Bowl, he rushed for 114 yards and two touchdowns, leading the Fighting Illini to a 21–17 victory over South Carolina, being named the game's MVP. Following the 2024 season, he entered the transfer portal.

On April 20, 2025, McCray announced his decision to transfer to the University of Georgia to play for the Georgia Bulldogs. Against No. 15 Tennessee, he rushed for two touchdowns, including the game winning score, in the 44–41 overtime victory.

=== Statistics ===
College statistics
Season	Team	Games	Rushing				Receiving			
Season	Team	GP	Att	Yards	Avg	TD	Rec	Yards	Avg	TD
2021	Illinois	11	112	549	4.9	2	2	43	21.5	0
2022	Illinois	4	19	56	2.9	0	4	19	4.8	0
2023	Illinois	5	43	156	3.6	2	6	30	5.0	0
2024	Illinois	13	117	609	5.2	10	13	116	8.9	1
2025	Georgia	11	48	135	2.8	3	2	9	4.5	0
Career		44	339	1,505	4.4	17	27	217	8.0	1

== Professional career ==
Pre-draft measurables
Height	Weight	Arm length	Hand span	Wingspan	40-yard dash	10-yard split	20-yard split	20-yard shuttle	Three-cone drill	Vertical jump	Broad jump	Bench press
5 ft 11 1/2 in (1.82 m)	250 lb (113 kg)	32 7/8 in (0.84 m)	9 1/8 in (0.23 m)	6 ft 7 7/8 in (2.03 m)	4.98 s	1.75 s	2.91 s	4.41 s	7.38 s	31.0 in (0.79 m)	9 ft 3 in (2.82 m)	19 reps
All values from Pro Day

McCray went undrafted in the 2026 NFL draft.
