= Tanner Arkin =

American football player (born 2003)

No. 84 – New England Patriots
- Position: Tight end
- Roster status: Practice squad

Personal information
- Born: July 7, 2003 (age 23); Kenosha, Wisconsin, U.S.
- Listed height: 6 ft 4 in (1.93 m)
- Listed weight: 262 lb (119 kg)

Career information
- High school: Fossil Ridge (Fort Collins, Colorado)
- College: Colorado State (2021–2022); Illinois (2023–2025)
- NFL draft: 2026: undrafted

Career history
- New England Patriots (2026–present)
- Stats at Pro Football Reference

Tanner Arkin (born July 7, 2003) is an American professional football tight end for the New England Patriots of the National Football League (NFL). He played college football for the Illinois Fighting Illini and Colorado State Rams.

== Early life ==
Arkin was born in Kenosha, Wisconsin, but his family moved to Fort Collins, Colorado when he was a child. He began playing football at a young age and, as a freshman in high school, was named captain of his team. During his sophomore year, he began playing on varsity, primarily as an outside linebacker instead of his preferred position, tight end. Before his junior season, he sustained a broken collarbone which sidelined him for the season. Finally, during his senior season, Arkin sustained a broken fibula during his second game, but continued to play for the remainder of the season. He was considered a two-star prospect coming out of high school and, on May 12, 2020, Arkin committed to play college football for the Colorado State Rams.

== College career ==
=== Colorado State ===
In his first season at Colorado State University, Arkin backed-up Trey McBride. He appeared in three games and took a redshirt for the season. The following season, he was named to the Preseason All-Mountain West list and appeared in every game for the Rams.

=== Illinois ===
On December 14, 2022, Arkin transferred to the University of Illinois Urbana-Champaign. In his first season with the Fighting Illini, he appeared in every game with three starts. Prior to his redshirt junior season, he was named a team captain. On August 8, 2025, Arkin was named to the John Mackey Award Watch List as one of the top tight ends in the nation.

=== College statistics ===
Legend
| **Bold** | Career high |

| Year | Team | GP | Receiving | | | | |
| Year | Team | GP | Rec | Yds | Avg | Lng | TD |
|---|---|---|---|---|---|---|---|
| 2021 | Colorado State | 3 | 1 | 9 | **9.0** | 9 | 0 |
| 2022 | Colorado State | 12 | 14 | **116** | 8.3 | 26 | 0 |
| 2023 | Illinois | 12 | 1 | 1 | 1.0 | 1 | 1 |
| 2024 | Illinois | **13** | **16** | 111 | 6.9 | 16 | **3** |
| 2025 | Illinois | **13** | 13 | 114 | 8.8 | **28** | 2 |
| Career | | 53 | 45 | 351 | 7.8 | 28 | 6 |

== Professional career ==
Pre-draft measurables
| Height | Weight | Arm length | Hand span | Wingspan | 40-yard dash | 10-yard split | 20-yard split | 20-yard shuttle | Three-cone drill | Vertical jump | Broad jump | Bench press |
|---|---|---|---|---|---|---|---|---|---|---|---|---|
| 6 ft 3 5/8 in (1.92 m) | 262 lb (119 kg) | 32 1/4 in (0.82 m) | 10 1/8 in (0.26 m) | 6 ft 5 5/8 in (1.97 m) | 4.89 s | 1.68 s | 2.78 s | 4.50 s | 7.44 s | 33.5 in (0.85 m) | 9 ft 5 in (2.87 m) | 21 reps |
All values from Pro Day

Arkin signed with the New England Patriots as an undrafted free agent on May 8, 2026.Arkin made his NFL debut on September 9, 2026, against the Seattle Seahawks. On November 9, he was waived and re-signed to the practice squad two days later.

== Personal life ==
Arkin is the son of Grady and Veronica Arkin. He has one brother, Owen, and a sister, Carmen. Arkin graduated from the University of Illinois in May 2025 with a degree in Kinesiology.
