= Luke Altmyer =

American football player (born 2002)

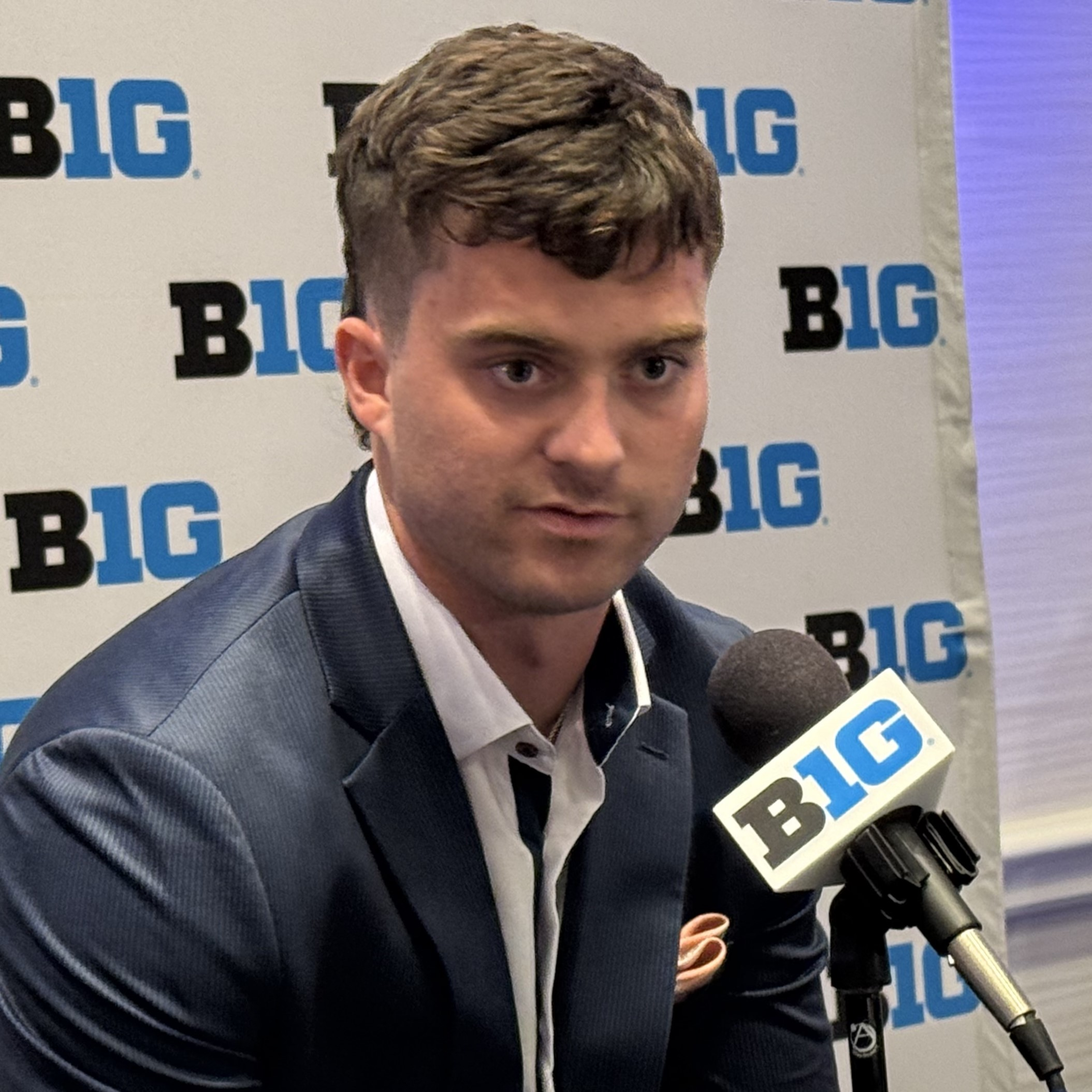
- Altmyer at Big Ten Media Days in 2025

No. 15 – Detroit Lions
- Position: Quarterback
- Roster status: Practice squad

Personal information
- Born: October 22, 2002 (age 24); Tennessee, U.S.
- Listed height: 6 ft 2 in (1.88 m)
- Listed weight: 210 lb (95 kg)

Career information
- High school: Starkville (Starkville, Mississippi)
- College: Ole Miss (2021–2022); Illinois (2023–2025)
- NFL draft: 2026: undrafted

Career history
- Detroit Lions (2026–present)*
- * Offseason or practice squad member only
- Stats at Pro Football Reference

William Luke Altmyer (born October 22, 2002) is an American professional football quarterback for the Detroit Lions of the National Football League (NFL). He played college football for the Ole Miss Rebels and Illinois Fighting Illini. Altmyer was signed as an undrafted free agent by the Lions after the 2026 NFL draft.

== Early life ==
Altmyer attended Starkville High School in Starkville, Mississippi, where he completed 454 of 659 passes for 5,523 yards and 63 touchdowns to ten interceptions and rushed for six touchdowns. He committed to play college football at Ole Miss over schools such as Alabama, Florida State, and LSU.

== College career ==
=== Ole Miss (2021–2022) ===
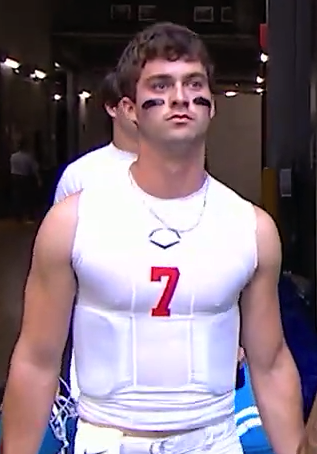
Altmyer with Ole Miss in 2021

==== 2021 season ====
In the 2022 Sugar Bowl, Altmyer replaced injured starter Matt Corral and went 15 for 28 for 174 yards, one touchdown, and two interceptions in a 21–7 loss to Baylor. He finished the season going 20 for 37 on his passes for 192 yards and a touchdown to two interceptions.

==== 2022 season ====
Altmyer opened the 2022 season against Troy as the backup to starter Jaxson Dart, completing one pass for 13 yards in the fourth quarter of the win. He made his first career start in week 2 against Central Arkansas. Altmyer completed 6-of-13 passes for 90 yards, two touchdowns, and an interception, while also rushing for a touchdown. However, he exited the game early in the second quarter with an injury. After Altmyer's injury, Dart took over the starting job for the rest of the season. Altmyer finished the season completing 8-of-17 passes for 125 yards with two touchdowns and one interception, while also adding a rushing touchdown. After the season, Altmyer announced his decision to enter the NCAA transfer portal.

=== Illinois (2023–2025) ===
==== 2023 season ====
On December 29, 2022, Altmyer transferred to Illinois. He was announced as the team's starting quarterback for their season opener against Toledo. In his Illinois debut, Altmyer completed 18-of-26 passes for 206 yards with two touchdowns and an interception while also having nine carries for 69 yards in a 30–28 win. Against Florida Atlantic, he threw for 303 yards and a touchdown while rushing for a touchdown in the 23–17 win. Against Minnesota, Altmyer completed 24 passes for 212 yards, three touchdowns, and an interception before getting injured late in fourth quarter. Senior quarterback John Paddock started the final three games of the season for Illinois. In nine games, Altmyer completed 175-of-270 passes for 1,883, 13 touchdowns, and 10 interceptions. He also had 94 rushing attempts for 282 yards and three touchdowns.

==== 2024 season ====
Against No. 22 Nebraska, Altmyer completed 21-of-27 passing attempts for 236 yards and four touchdowns to lead Illinois to a 31–24 overtime win. He became the first Illinois quarterback to throw four touchdowns on the road against a top-25 team since Kurt Kittner against Michigan in 1999. Altmyer also lead the Illini to their second 4–0 start since 1951. For his efforts he was named Big Ten Offensive Player of the Week (shared with Kaleb Johnson of Iowa). With the 4–0 start, Altmyer was the only player in the country to throw double digit touchdowns without throwing an interception. He led the Illini to a 9–3 record, with four game-winning drives, the most out of any team in the country. Altmyer ended the regular season with 21 touchdowns and five interceptions, along with four rushing touchdowns. On December 14, while the Illinois Fighting Illini were hosting the No. 1 Tennessee Volunteers in basketball, Altmyer announced his intention to return to the Illini for the 2025 season. The No. 20 Illini played the No. 15 South Carolina Gamecocks in the 2024 Citrus Bowl, where Altmyer threw for 174 yards, a touchdown, and an interception in a 21–17 victory to give the Illini their first 10 win season since 2001 and first bowl game win since 2011.

==== 2025 season ====
Altmyer was named MVP of the 2025 Music City Bowl.

=== College statistics ===
Season	Team	Games			Passing								Rushing			
Season	Team	GP	GS	Record	Cmp	Att	Pct	Yds	Avg	TD	Int	Rtg	Att	Yds	Avg	TD
2021	Ole Miss	5	0	0−0	20	37	54.1	192	5.2	1	2	95.8	21	0	0.0	0
2022	Ole Miss	4	1	1−0	8	17	47.1	125	7.4	2	1	135.9	4	3	0.8	1
2023	Illinois	9	9	4−5	175	270	64.8	1,883	7.0	13	10	131.9	94	282	3.0	3
2024	Illinois	13	13	10−3	211	347	60.8	2,717	7.8	22	6	144.0	99	217	2.2	4
2025	Illinois	13	13	9−4	246	365	67.4	3,007	8.2	22	5	153.7	100	242	2.4	5
Career		44	36	24−12	660	1,036	63.7	7,924	7.6	60	24	142.4	318	744	2.3	13

== Professional career ==
Pre-draft measurables
Height	Weight	Arm length	Hand span	Wingspan	40-yard dash	10-yard split	20-yard split	Vertical jump	Broad jump
6 ft 1 3/4 in (1.87 m)	210 lb (95 kg)	29 7/8 in (0.76 m)	9 in (0.23 m)	6 ft 2 3/4 in (1.90 m)	4.72 s	1.66 s	2.77 s	32.0 in (0.81 m)	9 ft 6 in (2.90 m)
All values from NFL Combine

Altmyer was signed as an undrafted free agent by the Detroit Lions after the conclusion of the 2026 NFL draft. Altmyer appeared in Week 1 of the preseason, completing 13 of 22 passing attempts for 130 yards, one touchdown, and two interceptions in a 16–14 Lions loss to the Cincinnati Bengals. On August 30, Altmyer was waived by Detroit as a part of final roster cuts; he was re–signed to the team's practice squad the following day.
