= D. K. McDonald =

American football player and coach

Current position
- Title: Defensive coordinator, cornerbacks coach
- Team: Kansas Jayhawks
- Conference: Big 12

Biographical details
- Education: Pennsylvania Western University, Edinboro (2001)

Playing career
- 1997–2000: Edinboro

Coaching career (HC unless noted)
- 2003–2005: Edinboro (DB)
- 2006–2010: IUP (DB)
- 2011: William & Mary (DB)
- 2012–2015: Toledo (CB)
- 2016–2018: Iowa State (PGC/CB)
- 2019–2020: Iowa State (PGC/S)
- 2021–2022: Philadelphia Eagles (assistant DB)
- 2023: Philadelphia Eagles (DB)
- 2024: Kansas (co-DC/CB)
- 2025–present: Kansas (DC)

D. K. McDonald is an American college football coach, currently the defensive coordinator and cornerbacks coach for the University of Kansas, a position he has held since 2024.

== Coaching career ==
McDonald got his first coaching job in 2003 as the secondary coach for his alma mater Edinboro. In 2006, He joined IUP as the team's secondary coach.

In 2011, McDonald got his first NCAA Division I coaching job with William & Mary as the team's defensive backs coach. In 2012, he was hired as the cornerbacks coach at Toledo. In 2016, he was hired by Iowa State as their passing game coordinator and cornerbacks coach. He would also coach safeties in 2018.

In 2021, McDonald was hired by the Philadelphia Eagles of the National Football League (NFL) to be an assistant defensive backs coach. For the 2023 season, he was promoted by the Eagles to be team's defensive backs coach.

In 2024, McDonald returned to college football as he was hired by Kansas to serve as the team's co-defensive coordinator and cornerbacks coach.

On December 8, 2024, McDonald was elevated to the role of defensive coordinator following the retirement of Brian Borland.
