= Josh Kreutz =

American football player (born 2003)

Columbus Aviators
- Position: Center
- Roster status: Unsigned draft pick

Personal information
- Born: March 2, 2003 (age 23); Bannockburn, Illinois, U.S.
- Listed height: 6 ft 2 in (1.88 m)
- Listed weight: 290 lb (132 kg)

Career information
- High school: Loyola Academy (Wilmette, Illinois)
- College: Illinois (2021–2025)
- NFL draft: 2026: undrafted

Career history
- Indianapolis Colts (2026)*; Columbus Aviators (2027-present)
- * Offseason or practice squad member only

Josh Kreutz (/ˈkruːts/; born March 2, 2003) is an American professional football center. He played college football for the Illinois Fighting Illini.

== Early life ==
Kreutz attended Loyola Academy in Wilmette, Illinois. While there, he played high school football.

247Sports rated Kreutz as a three-star prospect and the 54th-highest ranked interior offensive lineman in the class of 2021, and ESPN ranked him as the 11th-best center of the class. On July 9, 2020, he committed to the University of Illinois Urbana-Champaign.

== Professional career ==
Pre-draft measurables
| Height | Weight | Arm length | Hand span | Wingspan | 40-yard dash | 10-yard split | 20-yard split | 20-yard shuttle | Three-cone drill | Vertical jump | Broad jump | Bench press |
|---|---|---|---|---|---|---|---|---|---|---|---|---|
| 6 ft 1 5/8 in (1.87 m) | 290 lb (132 kg) | 31 1/4 in (0.79 m) | 9 3/4 in (0.25 m) | 6 ft 2 3/4 in (1.90 m) | 5.47 s | 1.93 s | 3.07 s | 4.68 s | 7.94 s | 30.5 in (0.77 m) | 8 ft 9 in (2.67 m) | 32 reps |
All values from Pro Day

Kreutz went undrafted in the 2026 NFL draft, but was signed by the Indianapolis Colts as an undrafted free agent on June 1, 2026. He was waived by Indianapolis on August 30.

== Personal life ==
Kreutz's father, Olin Kreutz, is a former NFL player, and was a six-time Pro Bowler for the Chicago Bears.

Josh Kreutz is a fan of the Chicago Bears.

Josh's brother James is a linebacker for the Illinois Fighting Illini.
