= Zakhari Franklin =

American football player (born 2000)

Profile
- Position: Wide receiver

Personal information
- Born: October 15, 2000 (age 26); Cedar Hill, Texas, U.S.
- Listed height: 6 ft 1 in (1.85 m)
- Listed weight: 204 lb (93 kg)

Career information
- High school: Cedar Hill
- College: UTSA (2019–2022); Ole Miss (2023); Illinois (2024)
- NFL draft: 2025: undrafted

Career history
- Las Vegas Raiders (2025)*; Montreal Alouettes (2026)*
- * Offseason or practice squad member only

Awards and highlights
- 2× First-team All-Conference USA (2021, 2022)
- Stats at Pro Football Reference
- Stats at CFL.ca

Zakhari Franklin (born October 15, 2000) is an American professional football wide receiver. He played college football for the UTSA Roadrunners, Ole Miss Rebels, and Illinois Fighting Illini.

== Early life ==
Franklin grew up in Cedar Hill, Texas and attended Cedar Hill High School. caught 23 passes for 687 yards and nine touchdowns. Franklin committed to play college football at the University of Texas at San Antonio (UTSA).

== College career ==
Franklin began his college career playing for the UTSA Roadrunners He had 38 catches for 491 yards and three touchdowns during his freshman season. Franklin was named honorable mention All-Conference USA after catching 49 passes for 694 yards and seven touchdowns as a sophomore. He was named first team All-Conference USA at the end of his junior season after setting school records with 81 catches, 1,027 receiving yards, and 12 touchdown receptions. As a senior, Franklin reset his program records with 94 receptions for 1,136 yards and 15 touchdowns. After the season, he entered the NCAA transfer portal and utilize the extra year of eligibility granted to college athletes who played in the 2020 season due to the coronavirus pandemic.

Franklin ultimately transferred to Ole Miss.

=== Statistics ===
Year	Team	Games		Receiving			
Year	Team	GP	GS	Rec	Yards	Avg	TD
2019	UTSA	9	4	38	491	12.9	3
2020	UTSA	10	9	49	694	14.2	7
2021	UTSA	13	13	81	1,027	12.7	12
2022	UTSA	14	14	94	1,136	12.1	15
2023	Ole Miss	4	2	4	38	9.5	1
2024	Illinois	13	13	55	652	11.9	4
Career		63	55	321	4,038	12.6	42

== Professional career ==
Pre-draft measurables
Height	Weight	Arm length	Hand span	Wingspan	40-yard dash	10-yard split	20-yard split	20-yard shuttle	Three-cone drill	Vertical jump	Broad jump
6 ft 1 1/8 in (1.86 m)	204 lb (93 kg)	33 5/8 in (0.85 m)	10 1/2 in (0.27 m)	6 ft 6 in (1.98 m)	4.64 s	1.66 s	2.69 s	4.38 s	7.12 s	30.5 in (0.77 m)	9 ft 9 in (2.97 m)
All values from Pro Day

=== Las Vegas Raiders ===
On May 9, 2025, Franklin signed with the Las Vegas Raiders as an undrafted free agent after going unselected in the 2025 NFL draft. He was waived on July 22.

=== Montreal Alouettes ===
On February 25, 2026, Franklin signed with the Montreal Alouettes of the Canadian Football League (CFL).
