= Robby Discher =

American football coach

Biographical details
- Born: 1985 or 1986 (age 40–41); Kansas City, Missouri

Playing career
- 2006–2008: William Jewell
- Position: Wide receiver

Coaching career (HC unless noted)
- 2009: Kearny HS (MO) (QB/LB)
- 2010–2011: Sam Houston (GA)
- 2012–2013: Sam Houston (ST)
- 2014–2015: Oklahoma State (GA)
- 2016–2019: Toledo (ST/TE)
- 2020: Louisiana (ST/defensive assistant)
- 2021: Georgia (special teams quality control)
- 2022: Tulane (ST)
- 2023–2025: Illinois (ST)
- 2026: Ohio State (ST)

Robby Discher (born 1985 or 1986) is an American football coach. He was most recently the special teams coordinator at Ohio State. Prior to that, he held the same role at Illinois. Discher was born in Kansas City, Missouri and attended William Jewell College. He began his coaching career in 2009 at Kearney High School in Kearney, Missouri.

== Early life ==
Discher grew up in Kansas City, Missouri, and attended North Kansas City High School. He played wide receiver at nearby William Jewell College from 2006 to 2008, where one of his teammates was future Oregon head coach Dan Lanning.

== Coaching career ==
Discher's coaching career began in 2009 with a one-year stint at Kearney High School in Kearney, Missouri, just down the road from William Jewell. From 2010 to 2011 he was a graduate assistant at Sam Houston State, then competing in the Division I FCS Southland Conference. 2010 was the first season for new head coach Willie Fritz, like Discher a native of Kansas City. Sam Houston State promoted Discher to special teams coach for the 2012 season.

Fritz departed after the 2013 season to become the head coach at Georgia Southern. Discher was one of four assistants retained by new head coach K. C. Keeler. A month later, he was hired away to coach special teams as a graduate assistant at Oklahoma State under head coach Mike Gundy. Oklahoma State won the 2014 edition of the Bedlam Series against Sooners after Tyreek Hill returned a punt 92 yards for a touchdown.

Discher departed Oklahoma State after the 2015 regular season to become special teams coordinator and tight ends coach at Toledo under new head coach Jason Candle. Discher coached at Toledo from 2016 to 2019. He was nominated for the Broyles Award after the 2018 season. In March 2020 Louisiana hired him to join Billy Napier's staff, again as special teams coach. Discher spent one season at Lafayette before joining Kirby Smart's staff at Georgia as a special team analyst, where he worked with coordinator Scott Cochran. Discher reunited with Willie Fritz, now the head coach at Tulane, for the 2022 season. Tulane went 12–2 and defeated USC in the Cotton Bowl, during which Tulane's special teams blocked three kicks.

Following the 2022 season, Illinois hired Discher as special teams coordinator under head coach Bret Bielema. Discher coached at Illinois from 2023 to 2025. In February 2026, Ohio State hired him away from Illinois for the same role under head coach Ryan Day. Discher was Ohio State's first special teams coordinator since the 2023 season. Ohio State fired Discher on November 9, 2026, following a 41–28 loss to Oregon (coached, ironically, by Discher's friend and former teammate Dan Lanning) that featured a successful fake punt by Oregon in the second quarter.
