= Dylan Rosiek =

American football player (born 2002)

No. 28 – Illinois Fighting Illini
- Position: Linebacker
- Class: Redshirt Junior

Personal information
- Born: November 11, 2002 (age 23)
- Listed height: 6 ft 0 in (1.83 m)
- Listed weight: 230 lb (104 kg)

Career information
- High school: East Lake (Tarpon Springs, Florida)
- College: Illinois (2021–2025)
- Stats at ESPN

Dylan Rosiek (born November 11, 2002) is an American college football linebacker for the Illinois Fighting Illini.

== Early life ==
Rosiek attended East Lake High School in Tarpon Springs, Florida. He was an unranked recruit and committed to play college football for the Illinois Fighting Illini over offer such as Air Force, Army, Bowling Green, Buffalo, and Colorado State.

== College career ==
In his first two seasons with Illinois in 2021 and 2022, Rosiek totaled eight tackles with one being for a loss in 16 total games. He got his first career start in the 2023 season opener, where he notched a team-high eight tackles in a win versus Toledo. In 12 games that season, Rosiek made eight starts for the Fighting Illini and notched 82 tackles and four forced fumbles, earning honorable mention all-Big Ten Conference honors. In week 7 of the 2024 season, he recorded the game-winning sack on quarterback Ryan Browne on the two point conversion in overtime to help Illinois beat Purdue 50-49. In week 11, he suffered a season-ending leg fracture versus Minnesota. Rosiek finished the 2024 season, notching 63 tackles with three being for a loss, a sack and a half, a pass deflection, and two forced fumbles for the Fighting Illini in nine games.

== Professional career ==
Pre-draft measurables
Height	Weight	Arm length	Hand span	Wingspan	40-yard dash	10-yard split	20-yard split	20-yard shuttle	Three-cone drill	Vertical jump	Broad jump	Bench press
5 ft 11 7/8 in (1.83 m)	230 lb (104 kg)	31 in (0.79 m)	9 in (0.23 m)	6 ft 2 1/2 in (1.89 m)	4.85 s	1.73 s	2.80 s	4.48 s	7.43 s	36.0 in (0.91 m)	9 ft 8 in (2.95 m)	21 reps
All values from Pro Day
