= Terrance Jamison =

American football coach (born 1987)

Buffalo Bills
- Title: Defensive line coach

Personal information
- Born: 1987 (age 38–39)

Career information
- Position: Defensive end
- High school: Thornton Township (Harvey, Illinois)
- College: Wisconsin (2005–2007)

Career history
- Wisconsin (2008–2009) Student assistant; Edgewood HS (WI) (2010) Defensive line coach; Wisconsin (2011–2012); Defensive quality control coach (2011); Graduate assistant (2012); California (2013) Defensive quality control coach; Florida Atlantic (2014–2016) Defensive line coach; Texas Tech (2017–2018) Defensive line coach; Air Force (2019) Defensive line coach; Purdue (2020) Defensive line coach; Illinois (2021–2025); Defensive line coach (2021–2022); Co-defensive coordinator & defensive line coach (2023–2025); Buffalo Bills (2026–present) Defensive line coach

Terrance Jamison (born 1987) is an American football coach who is currently the defensive line coach for the Buffalo Bills of the National Football League (NFL).

== Coaching career ==
Jamison got his first coaching job in 2008 as a student assistant working as team's assistant defensive line coach for the Wisconsin Badgers. In 2010, Jamison joined Edgewood High School as the schools defensive line coach. In 2011, Jamison joined the Badgers again as a quality control coach before becoming a graduate assistant in 2012. In 2013, Jamison was hired by California as a quality control coach. In 2014, Jamison was hired by the Florida Atlantic Owls to be the team's defensive line coach. In 2017, the Texas Tech Red Raiders hired Jamison to coach the team's defensive line. After two seasons with Texas Tech in 2019, Jamison joined the Air Force Falcons as the team's defensive line coach. In 2020, Jamison decided to join the Purdue Boilermakers as the team's defensive line coach. For the 2021 season, Jamison was hired by Illinois to coach the team's defensive line. After two seasons with the Fighting Illini in 2023, Jamison was promoted by Illinois to serve as the team's co-defensive coordinator and defensive line coach.

Jamison was hired by the Buffalo Bills on February 6, 2026 to serve as the team's defensive line coach under new head coach, Joe Brady.
