= Joshua Simon (American football) =

American football player (born 2000)

No. 40 – Carolina Panthers
- Position: Tight end
- Roster status: Practice squad

Personal information
- Born: November 27, 2000 (age 25); Dalzell, South Carolina, U.S.
- Listed height: 6 ft 4 in (1.93 m)
- Listed weight: 240 lb (109 kg)

Career information
- High school: Crestwood (Sumter, South Carolina)
- College: Western Kentucky (2019–2022); South Carolina (2023–2024)
- NFL draft: 2025: undrafted

Career history
- Atlanta Falcons (2025)*; Washington Commanders (2026)*; Carolina Panthers (2026–present)*
- * Offseason or practice squad member only
- Stats at Pro Football Reference

Joshua L. Simon (born November 27, 2000) is an American professional football tight end for the Carolina Panthers of the National Football League (NFL). He played college football for the Western Kentucky Hilltoppers and South Carolina Gamecocks.

== Early life ==
Simon was born on November 27, 2000, and grew up in Dalzell, South Carolina. He attended Crestwood High School where he played football. At Crestwood, he competed at the Progress Energy Bowl North-South All-Star Game. Ranked the 44th-best prospect in the state, he committed to play college football for the Western Kentucky Hilltoppers.

== College career ==
=== Western Kentucky ===
As a true freshman for the Hilltoppers in 2019, Simon appeared in all 13 games, six as a starter, totaling 30 receptions for 430 yards and four touchdowns. He was named second-team Freshman All-American by The Athletic, honorable mention All-Conference USA and to the Conference USA All-Freshman team. The following season, he caught 33 passes for 370 yards and three touchdowns, being chosen honorable mention All-Conference USA, as well as third-team all-conference by Phil Steele. He opened the 2021 season with three catches for 73 yards and two touchdowns but suffered a knee injury in the first game that resulted in him missing the remainder of the season. In 2022, Simon caught 20 passes for 273 yards and a touchdown while being named second-team All-Conference USA. He entered the NCAA transfer portal after the season and concluded his tenure at Western Kentucky having totaled 86 receptions for 1,146 yards and 16 touchdowns. His 16 career touchdown receptions set the program record for a tight end.

=== South Carolina ===
Simon transferred to the South Carolina Gamecocks in 2023. In his first season there, he caught 28 passes for 256 yards and two touchdowns. In 2024, his last year of college football, Simon recorded 40 receptions for 519 yards and seven touchdowns. He led the team in all three categories, the only tight end in school history to record the accomplishment, and was named fourth-team All-Southeastern Conference (SEC) by Phil Steele. After the season, he was invited to the NFL Scouting Combine.

== Professional career ==
Pre-draft measurables
Height	Weight	Arm length	Hand span	Wingspan	40-yard dash	10-yard split	20-yard split	20-yard shuttle	Three-cone drill	Vertical jump	Broad jump
6 ft 4 1/8 in (1.93 m)	239 lb (108 kg)	33 7/8 in (0.86 m)	10 1/8 in (0.26 m)	6 ft 11 in (2.11 m)	4.65 s	1.58 s	2.72 s	4.40 s	7.22 s	38.0 in (0.97 m)	10 ft 4 in (3.15 m)
All values from NFL Combine

=== Atlanta Falcons ===
After going unselected in the 2025 NFL draft, Simon signed with the Atlanta Falcons as an undrafted free agent on April 28, 2025. He was waived on August 26 as part of final roster cuts and re-signed to the practice squad the next day. On January 21, 2026, Simon signed a reserve/futures contract with Atlanta. On August 29, Simon was waived by the Falcons.

=== Washington Commmanders ===
Simon signed with the practice squad of the Washington Commanders signed on September 1, 2026. He was released by the Commanders on September 7.

=== Carolina Panthers ===
On November 17, 2026, Simon signed with the Carolina Panthers practice squad.
