= Josh Gesky =

American football player (born 2002)

No. 68 – New York Giants
- Position: Offensive lineman
- Roster status: Practice squad

Personal information
- Born: December 31, 2002 (age 23); Manteno, Illinois, U. S.
- Listed height: 6 ft 5 in (1.96 m)
- Listed weight: 308 lb (140 kg)

Career information
- High school: Manteno
- College: Illinois (2021–2025)
- NFL draft: 2026: undrafted

Career history
- Green Bay Packers (2026)*; New York Giants (2026–present)*
- * Offseason or practice squad member only
- Stats at Pro Football Reference

Josh Gesky (born December 31, 2002) is an American professional football offensive lineman for the New York Giants of the National Football League (NFL). He played college football for the Illinois Fighting Illini.

== Early life ==
Gesky was born on December 31, 2002, in Manteno, Illinois. He attended Manteno High School and was a three-time all-conference recipient at left tackle. Gesky was a three-star recruit when he committed to play college football at the University of Illinois.

== College career ==
Gesky played college football for the Illinois Fighting Illini from 2021 to 2025. He played in 48 games, starting in 34, earning All-Big Ten honorable mention honors in his final three seasons at left and right guard.

== Professional career ==
Pre-draft measurables
| Height | Weight | Arm length | Hand span | Wingspan | 40-yard dash | 10-yard split | 20-yard split | 20-yard shuttle | Three-cone drill | Vertical jump | Broad jump | Bench press |
|---|---|---|---|---|---|---|---|---|---|---|---|---|
| 6 ft 5 1/8 in (1.96 m) | 329 lb (149 kg) | 33 in (0.84 m) | 9 5/8 in (0.24 m) | 6 ft 7 3/4 in (2.03 m) | 5.03 s | 1.74 s | 2.87 s | 4.95 s | 8.06 s | 33.0 in (0.84 m) | 9 ft 1 in (2.77 m) | 30 reps |
All values from Pro Day

=== Green Bay Packers ===
After going undrafted in the 2026 NFL draft, Gesky signed with the Green Bay Packers as an undrafted free agent. He signed his rookie contract with $215,000 in guaranteed money. On August 30, Gesky was waived by the team as a part of final roster cuts. He was re–signed to the team's practice squad the following day. On October 13, Gesky was released.

=== New York Giants ===
On October 14, 2026, the New York Giants signed Geksy to their practice squad.
