= Kaden Feagin =

American football player (born 2004)

No. 83 – Illinois Fighting Illini
- Position: Tight end
- Class: Junior

Personal information
- Born: March 23, 2004 (age 22)
- Listed height: 6 ft 3 in (1.91 m)
- Listed weight: 260 lb (118 kg)

Career information
- High school: Arthur Lovington Atwood Hammond (Arthur, Illinois)
- College: Illinois (2023–present)
- Stats at ESPN

Kaden Feagin (born March 23, 2004) is an American college football tight end for the Illinois Fighting Illini.

== Early life ==
Feagin attended Arthur Lovington Atwood Hammond High School in Arthur, Illinois. As a senior he totaled 2,300 yards and 36 touchdowns on offense and 82 tackles, two interceptions, and a touchdown on defense. Coming out of high school, Feagin was rated as a four-star recruit and committed to play college football for the Illinois Fighting Illini.

== College career ==
In week 4 of the 2023 season, Feagin rushed for 28 yards in a win over Florida Atlantic. In week 7, he rushed 19 times for 84 yards and scored his first collegiate touchdown in a win over Maryland, earning Big Ten Conference freshman of the week honors. Feagin finished his first collegiate season in 2023, rushing 95 times for 438 yards and two touchdowns, before suffering a season-ending injury. He earned all-Big Ten Conference honorable mention.
