= 2025 Illinois Fighting Illini football team =

American college football season

2025 Illinois Fighting Illini football

Music City Bowl champion

Music City Bowl, W 30–28 vs. Tennessee
- Conference: Big Ten Conference

Ranking
- Coaches: No. 25
- Record: 9–4 (5–4 Big Ten)
- Head coach: Bret Bielema (5th season)
- Offensive coordinator: Barry Lunney Jr. (4th season)
- Offensive scheme: Spread
- Defensive coordinator: Aaron Henry (3rd season)
- Co-defensive coordinator: Terrance Jamison (3rd season)
- Base defense: Multiple 3–4
- Home stadium: Gies Memorial Stadium

2025 Big Ten Conference football standings
	Conf.			Overall
Team	W		L	W		L
No. 1 Indiana y$#^	9	–	0	16	–	0
No. 5 Ohio State y^	9	–	0	12	–	2
No. 4 Oregon ^	8	–	1	13	–	2
No. 21 Michigan	7	–	2	9	–	4
No. 20 USC	7	–	2	9	–	4
No. 17 Iowa	6	–	3	9	–	4
Illinois	5	–	4	9	–	4
Washington	5	–	4	9	–	4
Minnesota	5	–	4	8	–	5
Nebraska	4	–	5	7	–	6
Northwestern	4	–	5	7	–	6
Penn State	3	–	6	7	–	6
UCLA	3	–	6	3	–	9
Rutgers	2	–	7	5	–	7
Wisconsin	2	–	7	4	–	8
Maryland	1	–	8	4	–	8
Michigan State	1	–	8	4	–	8
Purdue	0	–	9	2	–	10
Championship: Indiana 13, Ohio State 10
# – College Football Playoff champion; ^ – College Football Playoff participant; $ – Conference champion; y – Championship game participant; As of November 12, 2026; Rankings from AP Poll

The 2025 Illinois Fighting Illini football team represented the University of Illinois Urbana-Champaign as a member of the Big Ten Conference during the 2025 NCAA Division I FBS football season. Led by fifth-year head coach Bret Bielema, the Fighting Illini played home games at Gies Memorial Stadium (renamed from "Memorial Stadium" shortly after the start of the 2025 season) in Champaign, Illinois.

== Offseason ==
=== Transfers ===
==== Outgoing ====
Player	Position	Destination
Declan Duley	P	Central Michigan
Morrison Giggetts	WR	Chicago
Zylon Crisler	IOL	Colorado
Ronan Poynton	LB	Drake
Demetrius Hill	S	FIU
Kenari Wilcher	WR	Florida A&M
Enyce Sledge	DL	Florida Atlantic
Steven Scott III	OT	Fresno State
Josh McCray	RB	Georgia
Cal Swanson	QB	Holy Cross
Nick True	TE	Illinois State
Alex Bray	DE	Kansas
Henry Boyer	TE	Kentucky
Joep Engbers	IOL	Liberty
Kirkland Michaux	QB	Mary Hardin–Baylor
Fabrizio Pinton	K	McNeese
Weston Adams	WR	Montana
Chase Canada	CB	North Texas
Zach Aamland	OL	Rutgers
Blayne Sisson	DB	Southern Illinois
Donovan Leary	QB	Tulane
Carlos Orr-Gillespie	WR	Utah State
Nate Guinn	TE	Utah Tech
Kevin Wigenton II	OL	Virginia
Ethan Moczulski	K	Washington
Hunter Whitenack	OL	Western Michigan
Jake Huber	QB	Wisconsin–La Crosse
Hugh Robertson	P	Unknown
Jake Furtney	TE	Withdrawn
Tyler Strain	DB	Withdrawn

==== Incoming ====
Player	Position	Previous school
Christian Abney	TE	Ball State
Justin Bowick	WR	Ball State
Eli Coenen	DL	Bemidji State
Tomiwa Durojaiye	DL	Florida State
Ayden Knapik	OL	Idaho
Nathan Knapik	OT	Idaho
Lucas Osada	K	North Carolina
Ethan Hampton	QB	Northern Illinois
Carter Hewitt	DL	Northern Iowa
Keelan Crimmins	P	Purdue
Davin Stoffel	TE	South Dakota State
Tyler McMillan	OL	Southeast Missouri State
Lars Rau	P	Texas State
Murphy Clement	RB	West Virginia
Hudson Clement	WR	West Virginia
Leon Lowery Jr.	DE	Wisconsin
James Thompson Jr.	DL	Wisconsin
Curt Neal	DL	Wisconsin

== Schedule ==
Date	Time	Opponent	Rank	Site	TV	Result	Attendance
August 29	6:30 p.m.	Western Illinois*	No. 12	Gies Memorial Stadium; Champaign, IL	Peacock	W 52–3	56,040
September 6	11:00 a.m.	at Duke*	No. 11	Wallace Wade Stadium; Durham, NC	ESPN	W 45–19	23,893
September 13	6:00 p.m.	Western Michigan*	No. 9	Gies Memorial Stadium; Champaign, IL	FS1	W 38–0	60,670
September 20	6:30 p.m.	at No. 19 Indiana	No. 9	Memorial Stadium; Bloomington, IN (rivalry)	NBC	L 10–63	56,088
September 27	11:00 a.m.	No. 21 USC^{†}	No. 23	Gies Memorial Stadium; Champaign, IL (Big Noon Kickoff)	FOX	W 34–32	60,670
October 4	11:00 a.m.	at Purdue	No. 22	Ross–Ade Stadium; West Lafayette, IN (rivalry)	BTN	W 43–27	56,551
October 11	11:00 a.m.	No. 1 Ohio State	No. 17	Gies Memorial Stadium; Champaign, IL (Illibuck, Big Noon Kickoff)	FOX	L 16–34	60,670
October 25	2:30 p.m.	at Washington	No. 23	Husky Stadium; Seattle, WA	BTN	L 25–42	68,630
November 1	11:00 a.m.	Rutgers		Gies Memorial Stadium; Champaign, IL	NBC	W 35–13	60,670
November 15	2:30 p.m.	Maryland		Gies Memorial Stadium; Champaign, IL	FS1	W 24–6	56,416
November 22	6:30 p.m.	at Wisconsin	No. 21	Camp Randall Stadium; Madison, WI	BTN	L 10–27	67,876
November 29	6:30 p.m.	Northwestern		Gies Memorial Stadium; Champaign, IL (rivalry)	FOX	W 20–13	53,317
December 30	4:30 p.m.	vs. Tennessee*		Nissan Stadium; Nashville, TN (Music City Bowl)	ESPN	W 30–28	52,815
*Non-conference game; ^{†}Homecoming; Rankings from AP Poll (from CFP Rankings, after November 4) - Released prior to game; All times are in Central time; Source:

== Rankings ==
Ranking movements Legend: ██ Increase in ranking ██ Decrease in ranking — = Not ranked RV = Received votes
	Week																
Poll	Pre	1	2	3	4	5	6	7	8	9	10	11	12	13	14	15	Final
AP	12	11	9	9	23	22	17	RV	23	RV	RV	RV	RV	RV	RV	RV	RV
Coaches	12	12	9	8	23	22	17	25	23	—	RV	RV	RV	RV	RV	RV	25
CFP	Not released										—	—	21	—	—	—	Not released

== Game summaries ==
=== vs Western Illinois (FCS) ===
Western Illinois Leathernecks (FCS) (0–0) at No. 12 Illinois Fighting Illini (0–0) – Game summary

Quarter	1	2	3	4	Total
Leathernecks (FCS)	0	0	0	3	3
No. 12 Fighting Illini	14	17	7	14	52

at Memorial Stadium • Champaign, Illinois

- Date: August 29
- Game time: 6:30 p.m.
- Game weather: Sunny • Temperature: 72 °F (22 °C) • Wind: SW at 6 miles per hour (9.7 km/h)
- Game attendance: 56,040
- Referee: Andrew Speciale
- TV announcers (Peacock): Paul Burmeister (play-by-play), Phil Simms (analyst), and Zora Stephenson (sideline reporter)

Game information

First quarter

- (6:43) ILL – Tanner Arkin 3-yard pass from Luke Altmyer (David Olano kick) (Drive: 8 plays, 59 yards, 4:14; Illinois 7–0)
- (3:48) ILL – Justin Bowick 3-yard pass from Luke Altmyer (David Olano kick) (Drive: 5 plays, 26 yards, 2:48; Illinois 14–0)

Second quarter

- (13:20) ILL – Aidan Laughery 25-yard run (David Olano kick) (Drive: 7 plays, 51 yards, 3:43; Illinois 21–0)
- (7:54) ILL – David Olano 35-yard field goal (Drive: 8 plays, 49 yards, 3:25; Illinois 24–0)
- (3:09) ILL – Justin Bowick 13-yard pass from Luke Altmyer (David Olano kick) (Drive: 4 plays, 62 yards, 2:34; Illinois 31–0)

Third quarter

- (8:00) ILL – Hank Beatty 69-yard punt return (David Olano kick) (Drive: 3 plays, 1 yard, 2:13; Illinois 38–0)

Fourth quarter

- (14:57) WIU – Antonio Chadha 20-yard field goal (Drive: 16 plays, 73 yards, 8:03; Illinois 38–3)
- (8:27) ILL – Kaden Feagin 7-yard run (David Olano kick) (Drive: 10 plays, 75 yards, 6:30; Illinois 45–3)
- (5:27) ILL – Aidan Laughery 57-yard run (David Olano kick) (Drive: 2 plays, 67 yards, 0:55; Illinois 52–3)

Statistics	WIU	ILL
First downs	11	21
Plays–yards	56–163	61–440
Rushes–yards	26–29	37–209
Passing yards	134	231
Passing: comp–att–int	14–29–0	18–22–0
Turnovers	1	0
Time of possession	27:18	32:42

Team	Category	Player	Statistics
Western Illinois	Passing	Chris Irvin	14/29, 134 yards
Western Illinois	Rushing	Markell Holman	12 carries, 20 yards
Western Illinois	Receiving	Demari Davis	4 receptions, 65 yards
Illinois	Passing	Luke Altmyer	17/21, 217 yards, 3 TD
Illinois	Rushing	Aidan Laughery	9 carries, 101 yards, 2 TD
Illinois	Receiving	Hank Beatty	5 receptions, 108 yards

=== at Duke ===
No. 11 Illinois Fighting Illini (1–0) at Duke Blue Devils (1–0) – Game summary

Quarter	1	2	3	4	Total
No. 11 Fighting Illini	7	7	14	17	45
Blue Devils	3	10	6	0	19

at Wallace Wade Stadium • Durham, North Carolina

- Date: September 6
- Game time: 11:00 a.m.
- Game weather:
- Game attendance: 23,893
- Referee: Ron Snodgrass
- TV announcers (ESPN): Dave Pasch (play-by-play), Dusty Dvoracek (analyst), and Taylor McGregor (sideline reporter)

Game information

First quarter

- DUKE – Todd Pelino 40-yard field goal, 10:26. Blue Devils 3–0. Drive: 9 plays, 52 yards, 4:34.
- ILL – Kaden Feagin 1-yard run (David Olano kick), 1:51. Fighting Illini 7–3. Drive: 5 plays, 18 yards, 2:14.

Second quarter

- DUKE – Todd Pelino 40-yard field goal, 11:08. Fighting Illini 7–6. Drive: 14 plays, 52 yards, 5:43.
- ILL – Cole Rusk 8-yard pass from Luke Altmyer (David Olano kick), 5:01. Fighting Illini 14–6. Drive: 12 plays, 75 yards, 6:07.
- DUKE – Andrel Anthony 5-yard pass from Darian Mensah (Todd Pelino kick), 0:08. Fighting Illini 14–13. Drive: 9 plays, 77 yards, 1:03.

Third quarter

- ILL – Justin Bowick 4-yard pass from Luke Altmyer (David Olano kick), 9:34. Fighting Illini 21–13. Drive: 11 plays, 75 yards, 5:26.
- ILL – Hank Beatty 25-yard run (David Olano kick), 6:54. Fighting Illini 28–13. Drive: 4 plays, 61 yards, 1:06.
- DUKE – Andrel Anthony 6-yard pass from Darian Mensah (pass failed), 4:00. Fighting Illini 28–19. Drive: 7 plays, 75 yards, 2:54.

Fourth quarter

- ILL – David Olano 35-yard field goal, 14:04. Fighting Illini 31–19. Drive: 9 plays, 57 yards, 4:56.
- ILL – Collin Dixon 2-yard pass from Luke Altmyer (David Olano kick), 4:14. Fighting Illini 38–19. Drive: 12 plays, 89 yards, 6:45.
- ILL – Ca'Lil Valentine 23-yard run (David Olano kick), 3:58. Fighting Illini 45–19. Drive: 1 play, 23 yards, 0:06.

Statistics	ILL	DUKE
First downs	25	21
Plays–yards	73–419	63–438
Rushes–yards	42–123	24–82
Passing yards	296	356
Passing: comp–att–int	22–31–0	25–39–1
Turnovers	0	5
Time of possession	36:12	23:48

Team	Category	Player	Statistics
Illinois	Passing	Luke Altmyer	22/31, 296 yards, 3 TD
Illinois	Rushing	Kaden Feagin	17 carries, 48 yards, TD
Illinois	Receiving	Hank Beatty	8 receptions, 128 yards
Duke	Passing	Darian Mensah	23/24, 234 yards, 2 TD, INT
Duke	Rushing	Jaquez Moore	6 carries, 30 yards
Duke	Receiving	Cooper Barkate	4 receptions, 88 yards

=== vs Western Michigan ===
Western Michigan Broncos (0–2) at No. 9 Illinois Fighting Illini (2–0) – Game summary

Quarter	1	2	3	4	Total
Broncos	0	0	0	0	0
No. 9 Fighting Illini	3	7	14	14	38

at Gies Memorial Stadium • Champaign, Illinois

- Date: September 13
- Game time: 6:00 p.m.
- Game weather: Cloudy, 90 F, Wind: South East 6 mph
- Game attendance: 60,670
- Referee: Mark Kluczynski
- TV announcers (FS1): Noah Reed (play-by-play) and Robert Smith (analyst)

Game information

First quarter

- (8:47) ILL – David Olano 28-yard field goal (Drive: 14 plays, 65 yards, 6:13; Illinois 3-0)

Second quarter

- (13:31) ILL – Hank Beatty 6-yard pass from Luke Altmyer, David Olano kick (Drive: 9 plays, 68 yards, 3:53; Illinois 10-0)

Third quarter

- (10:59) ILL – Kaden Feagin 3-yard run, David Olano kick (Drive: 5 plays, 53 yards, 2:01; Illinois 17-0)
- (2:48) ILL – Luke Altmyer 2-yard run, David Olano kick (Drive: 10 plays, 80 yards, 4:54; Illinois 24-0)

Fourth quarter

- (13:31) ILL – Ashton Hollins 6-yard pass from Luke Altmyer, David Olano kick (Drive: 5 plays, 53 yards, 2:08; Illinois 31-0)
- (5:15) ILL – Ca'Lil Valentine 2-yard run, David Olano kick (Drive: 7 plays, 42 yards, 4:24; Illinois 38-0)

Statistics	WMU	ILL
First downs	12	20
Plays–yards	58–204	63–358
Rushes–yards	34-113	37-162
Passing yards	91	196
Passing: comp–att–int	13-24-0	17-26-0
Turnovers	0	0
Time of possession	28:27	31:33

Team	Category	Player	Statistics
Western Michigan	Passing	Broc Lowry	10/16, 78 yards
Western Michigan	Rushing	Ofa Mataele	8 carries, 46 yards
Western Michigan	Receiving	Baylin Brooks	3 receptions, 24 yards
Illinois	Passing	Luke Altmyer	17/26, 196 yards, 2 TD
Illinois	Rushing	Kaden Feagin	20 carries, 100 yards, TD
Illinois	Receiving	Hank Beatty	6 receptions, 53 yards, TD

=== at No. 19 Indiana (rivalry) ===
No. 9 Illinois Fighting Illini (3–0) at No. 19 Indiana Hoosiers (3–0) – Game summary

Quarter	1	2	3	4	Total
No. 9 Fighting Illini	7	3	0	0	10
No. 19 Hoosiers	14	21	14	14	63

at Memorial Stadium • Bloomington, Indiana

- Date: September 20
- Game time: 6:30 p.m.
- Game weather: Clear • Temperature: 75 °F (24 °C) • Wind: S at 2 miles per hour (3.2 km/h)
- Game attendance: 56,088
- Referee: Chris Coyle
- TV announcers (NBC): Noah Eagle (play-by-play), Todd Blackledge (analyst), and Kathryn Tappen (sideline reporter)

Game information

First quarter

- IU – D'Angelo Ponds 11-yard return of blocked punt (Nico Radicic kick), 9:26. Hoosiers 7–0.
- ILL – Collin Dixon 59-yard pass from Luke Altmyer (David Olano kick), 8:24. Tied 7–7. 3 plays, 75 yards, 1:02.
- IU – Omar Cooper Jr. 11-yard pass from Fernando Mendoza (Nico Radicic kick), 4:41. Hoosiers 14–7. 7 plays, 75 yards, 3:43.

Second quarter

- IU – E.J. Williams Jr. 11-yard pass from Fernando Mendoza (Nico Radicic kick), 11:05. Hoosiers 21–7. 7 plays, 56 yards, 3:41.
- IU – Riley Nowakowski 43-yard pass from Fernando Mendoza (Nico Radicic kick), 6:17. Hoosiers 28–7. 4 plays, 80 yards, 2:19.
- IU – Elijah Sarratt 9-yard pass from Fernando Mendoza (Nico Radicic kick), 1:09. Hoosiers 35–7. 9 plays, 65 yards, 3:14.
- ILL – David Olano 46-yard field goal, 0:00. Hoosiers 35–10. 8 plays, 47 yards, 1:09.

Third quarter

- IU – Kaelon Black 40-yard run (Nico Radicic kick), 11:38. Hoosiers 42–10. 7 plays, 75 yards, 3:22.
- IU – Elijah Sarratt 5-yard pass from Fernando Mendoza (Nico Radicic kick), 5:02. Hoosiers 49–10. 9 plays, 44 yards, 4:57.

Fourth quarter

- IU – Khobie Martin 31-yard run (Nico Radicic kick), 14:09. Hoosiers 56–10. 8 plays, 69 yards, 5:07.
- IU – Khobie Martin 8-yard run (Nico Radicic kick), 6:38. Hoosiers 63–10. 8 plays, 67 yards, 5:23.

Statistics	ILL	IU
First downs	9	31
Plays–yards	45–161	72–579
Rushes–yards	20–2	49–312
Passing yards	159	267
Passing: comp–att–int	16–25–1	21–23–0
Turnovers	1	0
Time of possession	20:17	39:43

Team	Category	Player	Statistics
Illinois	Passing	Luke Altmyer	14/22, 146 yards, TD
Illinois	Rushing	Kaden Feagin	5 carries, 18 yards
Illinois	Receiving	Collin Dixon	4 receptions, 86 yards, TD
Indiana	Passing	Fernando Mendoza	21/23, 267 yards, 5 TD
Indiana	Rushing	Khobie Martin	12 carries, 107 yards, 2 TD
Indiana	Receiving	Elijah Sarratt	9 receptions, 92 yards, 2 TD

=== vs No. 21 USC ===
No. 21 USC Trojans (4–0) at No. 23 Illinois Fighting Illini (3–1) – Game summary

Quarter	1	2	3	4	Total
No. 21 Trojans	7	3	7	15	32
No. 23 Fighting Illini	7	7	10	10	34

at Gies Memorial Stadium • Champaign, Illinois

- Date: September 27
- Game time: 11:00 a.m.
- Game weather: Sunny • Temperature: 84 °F (29 °C) • Wind: W at 4 miles per hour (6.4 km/h)
- Game attendance: 60,670
- Referee: Kole Knueppel
- TV announcers (FOX): Gus Johnson (play-by-play), Joel Klatt (analyst), and Jenny Taft (sideline reporter)

Game information

First quarter

- (5:49) ILL – Luke Altmyer 2-yard run, David Olano kick (Drive: 10 plays, 70 yards, 5:00; Illinois 7-0)
- (1:22) USC – Waymond Jordan 1-yard run, Ryon Sayeri kick (Drive: 9 plays, 75 yards, 4:27; 7-7)

Second quarter

- (10:49) ILL – Luke Altmyer 3-yard pass from Hank Beatty, David Olano kick (Drive: 11 plays, 75 yards, 5:33; Illinois 14-7)
- (0:02) USC – Ryon Sayeri 21-yard field goal (Drive: 7 plays, 70 yards, 0:47; Illinois 14-10)

Third quarter

- (11:34) ILL – David Olano 45-yard field goal (Drive: 8 plays, 49 yards, 3:26; Illinois 17-10)
- (6:59) ILL – Kaden Feagin 64-yard pass from Luke Altmyer, David Olano kick (Drive: 2 plays, 66 yards, 0:45; Illinois 24-10)
- (1:46) USC – Waymond Jordan 2-yard run, Ryon Sayeri kick (Drive: 11 plays, 81 yards, 5:08; Illinois 24-17)

Fourth quarter

- (14:34) ILL – Justin Bowick 25-yard pass from Luke Altmyer, David Olano kick (Drive: 5 plays, 75 yards, 2:12; Illinois 31-17)
- (9:54) USC – Makai Lemon 19-yard pass from Jayden Maiava, Jayden Maiava pass to Makai Lemon for two-point conversion (Drive: 11 plays, 75 yards, 4:40; Illinois 31-25)
- (1:55) USC – Makai Lemon 16-yard pass from Jayden Maiava, Ryon Sayeri kick (Drive: 9 plays, 80 yards, 4:26; USC 32-31)
- (0:00) ILL – David Olano 41-yard field goal (Drive: 8 plays, 51 yards, 1:55; Illinois 34-32)

Statistics	USC	ILL
First downs	29	25
Plays–yards	77–490	62–502
Rushes–yards	34-126	35-171
Passing yards	364	331
Passing: comp–att–int	30-43-1	21-27-0
Turnovers	2	2
Time of possession	32:34	27:26

Team	Category	Player	Statistics
USC	Passing	Jayden Maiava	30/43, 364 yards, 2 TD, INT
USC	Rushing	Waymond Jordan	20 carries, 94 yards, 2 TD
USC	Receiving	Makai Lemon	11 receptions, 151 yards, 2 TD
Illinois	Passing	Luke Altmyer	20/26, 328 yards, 2 TD
Illinois	Rushing	Kaden Feagin	14 carries, 60 yards
Illinois	Receiving	Collin Dixon	4 receptions, 90 yards

=== at Purdue (rivalry) ===
No. 22 Illinois Fighting Illini (4–1) at Purdue Boilermakers (2–2) – Game summary

Quarter	1	2	3	4	Total
No. 22 Fighting Illini	0	27	13	3	43
Boilermakers	7	7	7	6	27

at Ross–Ade Stadium • West Lafayette, Indiana

- Date: October 4
- Game time: 11:00 a.m.
- Game weather: Sunny, 81 degrees
- Game attendance: 56,551
- Referee: Jason Nickleby
- TV announcers (BTN): Mark Followill (play-by-play), Yogi Roth (analyst), and Rhett Lewis (sideline reporter)

Game information

First quarter

- (7:27) PUR – Ryan Browne 1-yard run, Spencer Porath kick (Drive: 10 plays, 62 yards, 4:05; Purdue 7-0)

Second quarter

- (14:56) ILL – David Olano 35-yard field goal (Drive: 14 plays, 58 yards, 7:31; Purdue 7-3)
- (12:50) ILL – Hank Beatty 62-yard pass from Luke Altmyer, David Olano kick (Drive: 1 play, 62 yards, 0:23; Illinois 10-7)
- (3:52) ILL – Kaden Feagin 6-yard run, David Olano kick (Drive: 8 plays, 94 yards, 5:03; Illinois 17-7)
- (2:25) ILL – Ca'Lil Valentine 25-yard run, David Olano kick (Drive: 2 plays, 80 yards, 0:38; Illinois 24-7)
- (1:13) PUR – Corey Smith 60-yard pass from Ryan Browne, Spencer Porath kick (Drive: 5 plays, 75 yards, 1:12; Illinois 24-14)
- (0:00) ILL – David Olano 42-yard field goal (Drive: 5 plays, 51 yards, 1:13; Illinois 27-14)

Third quarter

- (11:44) ILL – David Olano 45-yard field goal (Drive: 6 plays, 38 yards, 3:16; Illinois 30-14)
- (9:01) PUR – Antonio Harris 41-yard run, Spencer Porath kick (Drive: 6 plays, 81 yards, 2:39; Illinois 30-21)
- (5:16) ILL – David Olano 34-yard field goal (Drive: 4 plays, -7 yards, 1:56; Illinois 33-21)
- (1:19) ILL – Kaden Feagin 1-yard run, David Olano kick (Drive: 5 plays, 68 yards, 2:56; Illinois 40-21)

Fourth quarter

- (12:34) PUR – Devin Mockobee 1-yard run, two-point pass conversion failed (Drive: 13 plays, 75 yards, 3:45; Illinois 40-27)
- (1:06) ILL – David Olano 40-yard field goal (Drive: 4 plays, 3 yards, 1:31; Illinois 43-27)

Statistics	ILL	PUR
First downs	22	25
Plays–yards	63–507	75–453
Rushes–yards	41–117	25–151
Passing yards	390	302
Passing: comp–att–int	19–22–0	30–50–2
Turnovers	0	2
Time of possession	34:32	25:28

Team	Category	Player	Statistics
Illinois	Passing	Luke Altmyer	19/22, 390 yards, TD
Illinois	Rushing	Ca'Lil Valentine	22 carries, 95 yards, TD
Illinois	Receiving	Hank Beatty	5 receptions, 186 yards, TD
Purdue	Passing	Ryan Browne	30/50, 302 yards, TD
Purdue	Rushing	Antonio Harris	4 carries, 69 yards, TD
Purdue	Receiving	Michael Jackson III	14 receptions, 94 yards

=== vs No. 1 Ohio State (Illibuck) ===
No. 1 Ohio State Buckeyes (5–0) at No. 17 Illinois Fighting Illini (5–1) – Game summary

Quarter	1	2	3	4	Total
No. 1 Buckeyes	10	10	7	7	34
No. 17 Fighting Illini	0	3	7	6	16

at Gies Memorial Stadium • Champaign, Illinois

- Date: October 11
- Game time: 11:00 a.m.
- Game weather: Sunny • Temperature: 67 °F (19 °C) • Wind: NE at 10 miles per hour (16 km/h)
- Game attendance: 60,670
- Referee: Tim O'Dey
- TV announcers (FOX): Gus Johnson (play-by-play), Joel Klatt (analyst), and Jenny Taft (sideline reporter)

Game information

First quarter

- (9:35) OSU – Jayden Fielding 26-yard field goal (Drive: 12 plays, 67 yards, 5:25; Ohio State 3–0)
- (3:40) OSU – CJ Donaldson 1-yard run, Jayden Fielding kick (Drive: 6 plays, 35 yards, 3:15; Ohio State 10–0)

Second quarter

- (6:43) OSU – Jayden Fielding 31-yard field goal (Drive: 6 plays, 25 yards, 2:39; Ohio State 13–0)
- (3:48) OSU – Bo Jackson 17-yard pass from Julian Sayin, Jayden Fielding kick (Drive: 5 plays, 26 yards, 2:50; Ohio State 20–0)
- (1:05) ILL – David Olano 24-yard field goal (Drive: 11 plays, 69 yards, 2:43; Ohio State 20–3)

Third quarter

- (10:06) ILL – Aidan Laughery 1-yard run, David Olano kick (Drive: 12 plays, 75 yards, 4:54; Ohio State 20–10)
- (2:08) OSU – CJ Donaldson 2-yard run, Jayden Fielding kick (Drive: 14 plays, 63 yards, 7:52; Ohio State 27–10)

Fourth quarter

- (13:25) OSU – Jeremiah Smith 2-yard pass from Julian Sayin, Jayden Fielding kick (Drive: 7 plays, 24 yards, 3:08; Ohio State 34–10)
- (4:25) ILL – Collin Dixon 4-yard pass from Luke Altmyer, pass failed (Drive: 9 plays, 61 yards, 4:07; Ohio State 34–16)

Statistics	OSU	ILL
First downs	17	22
Plays–yards	64–272	71–295
Rushes–yards	27–47	37–106
Passing yards	166	248
Passing: comp–att–int	19–27–0	30–44–1
Turnovers	0	3
Time of possession	33:11	26:49

Team	Category	Player	Statistics
Ohio State	Passing	Julian Sayin	19/27, 166 yards, 2 TD
Ohio State	Rushing	Bo Jackson	10 carries, 47 yards
Ohio State	Receiving	Jeremiah Smith	5 receptions, 42 yards, TD
Illinois	Passing	Luke Altmyer	30/44, 248 yards, TD, INT
Illinois	Rushing	Aidan Laughery	8 carries, 50 yards, TD
Illinois	Receiving	Cole Rusk	5 receptions, 68 yards

=== at Washington ===
No. 23 Illinois Fighting Illini (5–2) at Washington Huskies (5–2) – Game summary

Quarter	1	2	3	4	Total
No. 23 Fighting Illini	3	14	0	8	25
Huskies	14	7	7	14	42

at Husky Stadium • Seattle, Washington

- Date: October 25
- Game time: 3:30 p.m.
- Game weather: Cloudy • Temperature: 53 °F (12 °C) • Wind: SE 15 mph
- Game attendance: 68,630
- Referee: Francisco Villar
- TV announcers (BTN): Jeff Levering (play-by-play), Jake Butt (analyst), and Brooke Fletcher (sideline reporter)

Game information

First quarter

- (9:31) WASH – Dezmen Roebuck 13-yard pass from Demond Williams Jr., Grady Gross kick (Drive: 10 plays, 75 yards, 5:23; Washington 7-0)
- (5:05) ILL – David Olano 33-yard field goal (Drive: 10 plays, 39 yards, 4:20; Washington 7-3)
- (0:46) WASH – Dezmen Roebuck 13-yard pass from Demond Williams Jr., Grady Gross kick (Drive: 8 plays, 67 yards, 4:12; Washington 14-3)

Second quarter

- (7:26) ILL – Collin Dixon 2-yard pass from Luke Altmyer, David Olano kick (Drive: 14 plays, 75 yards, 8:20; Washington 14-10)
- (1:55) ILL – Tanner Arkin 5-yard pass from Luke Altmyer, David Olano kick (Drive: 10 plays, 79 yards, 4:15; Illinois 17-14)
- (0:40) WASH – Jonah Coleman 12-yard pass from Denzel Boston, Grady Gross kick (Drive: 11 plays, 75 yards, 1:15; Washington 21-17)

Third quarter

- (7:45) WASH – Jonah Coleman 7-yard run, Grady Gross kick (Drive: 11 plays, 90 yards, 5:37; Washington 28-17)

Fourth quarter

- (14:39) WASH – Denzel Boston 6-yard pass from Demond Williams Jr., Grady Gross kick (Drive: 7 plays, 36 yards, 2:50; Washington 35-17)
- (11:07) ILL – Jordan Anderson 1-yard run, Luke Altmyer pass to Cole Rusk for two-point conversion (Drive: 7 plays, 75 yards, 3:32; Washington 35-25)
- (8:16) WASH – Decker DeGraaf 2-yard pass from Demond Williams Jr., Grady Gross kick (Drive: 7 plays, 75 yards, 2:51; Washington 42-25)

Statistics	ILL	WASH
First downs	22	27
Plays–yards	67–337	67–449
Rushes–yards	29-138	33-157
Passing yards	199	292
Passing: comp–att–int	22-34-2	27-34-0
Turnovers	2	0
Time of possession	30:21	29:39

Team	Category	Player	Statistics
Illinois	Passing	Luke Altmyer	22/34, 199 yards, 2 TD, 2 INT
Illinois	Rushing	Luke Altmyer	7 carries, 48 yards
Illinois	Receiving	Hank Beatty	6 receptions, 73 yards
Washington	Passing	Demond Williams Jr.	26/33, 280 yards, 4 TD
Washington	Rushing	Jonah Coleman	14 carries, 75 yards, TD
Washington	Receiving	Denzel Boston	10 receptions, 153 yards, TD

=== vs Rutgers ===
Rutgers Scarlet Knights (4–4) at Illinois Fighting Illini (5–3) – Game summary

Quarter	1	2	3	4	Total
Scarlet Knights	0	6	0	7	13
Fighting Illini	7	14	14	0	35

at Gies Memorial Stadium • Champaign, Illinois

- Date: November 1
- Game time: 11:00 a.m.
- Game weather: Sunny • Temperature: 47 °F (8 °C) • Wind: W at 8 miles per hour (13 km/h)
- Game attendance: 60,670
- Referee: Ron Snodgrass
- TV announcers (NBC): Paul Burmeister (play-by-play), Jason Garrett (analyst), and Zora Stephenson (sideline reporter)

Game information

First quarter

- (4:04) ILL – Kaden Feagin 7-yard pass from Luke Altmyer, David Olano kick (Drive: 12 plays, 99 yards, 6:11; Illinois 7-0)

Second quarter

- (13:41) RUTG – Jai Patel 26-yard field goal (Drive: 13 plays, 67 yards, 5:23; Illinois 7-3)
- (5:45) RUTG – Jai Patel 40-yard field goal (Drive: 10 plays, 24 yards, 4:49; Illinois 7-6)
- (2:04) ILL – Luke Altmyer 3-yard run, David Olano kick (Drive: 9 plays, 75 yards, 3:41; Illinois 14-6)
- (0:29) ILL – Hank Beatty 1-yard pass from Luke Altmyer, David Olano kick (Drive: 8 plays, 70 yards, 0:58; Illinois 21-6)

Third quarter

- (10:40) ILL – Hudson Clement 20-yard pass from Luke Altmyer, David Olano kick (Drive: 9 plays, 75 yards, 4:20; Illinois 28-6)
- (3:25) ILL – Collin Dixon 7-yard pass from Luke Altmyer, David Olano kick (Drive: 11 plays, 65 yards, 5:47; Illinois 35-6)

Fourth quarter

- (5:47) RUTG – KJ Duff 3-yard pass from Athan Kaliakmanis, Jai Patel kick (Drive: 8 plays, 73 yards, 4:33; Illinois 35-13)

Statistics	RUTG	ILL
First downs	19	26
Plays–yards	72–312	69–445
Rushes–yards	27–59	38–210
Passing yards	253	235
Passing: comp–att–int	25–45–0	19–31–1
Turnovers	0	1
Time of possession	27:25	32:35

Team	Category	Player	Statistics
Rutgers	Passing	Athan Kaliakmanis	25/45, 253 yards, TD
Rutgers	Rushing	Ja'shon Benjamin	8 carries, 37 yards
Rutgers	Receiving	KJ Duff	9 receptions, 93 yards, TD
Illinois	Passing	Luke Altmyer	19/31, 235 yards, 4 TD, INT
Illinois	Rushing	Luke Altmyer	7 carries, 88 yards, TD
Illinois	Receiving	Hudson Clement	5 receptions, 84 yards, TD

=== vs Maryland ===
Maryland Terrapins (4–5) at Illinois Fighting Illini (6–3) – Game summary

Quarter	1	2	3	4	Total
Terrapins	3	3	0	0	6
Fighting Illini	7	7	7	3	24

at Gies Memorial Stadium • Champaign, Illinois

- Date: November 15
- Game time: 2:30 p.m.
- Game weather: Cloudy • Temperature: 72 °F (22 °C) • Wind: W at 17 miles per hour (27 km/h)
- Game attendance: 56,416
- Referee: Mark Kluczynski
- TV announcers (FS1): Noah Reed (play-by-play) and Robert Smith (analyst)

Game information

First quarter

- (9:15) MD – Sean O'Haire 29-yard field goal (Drive: 13 plays, 65 yards, 5:45; Maryland 3-0)
- (0:00) ILL – Hudson Clement 22-yard pass from Luke Altmyer, David Olano kick (Drive: 7 plays, 51 yards, 4:05; Illinois 7-3)

Second quarter

- (6:12) MD – Sean O'Haire 43-yard field goal (Drive: 5 plays, 29 yards, 1:44; Illinois 7-6)
- (1:38) ILL – Kaden Feagin 3-yard run, David Olano kick (Drive: 13 plays, 75 yards, 4:34; Illinois 14-6)

Third quarter

- (10:05) ILL – Hudson Clement 23-yard pass from Luke Altmyer, David Olano kick (Drive: 7 plays, 67 yards, 4:00; Illinois 21-6)

Fourth quarter

- (4:19) ILL – David Olano 33-yard field goal (Drive: 12 plays, 82 yards, 5:53; Illinois 24-6)

Statistics	MD	ILL
First downs	18	24
Plays–yards	64–293	72–397
Rushes–yards	18–55	48–225
Passing yards	238	172
Passing: comp–att–int	25–46–1	15–25–1
Turnovers	1	1
Time of possession	24:03	35:57

Team	Category	Player	Statistics
Maryland	Passing	Malik Washington	25/46, 238 yards, INT
Maryland	Rushing	DeJuan Williams	9 carries, 43 yards
Maryland	Receiving	Shaleak Knotts	4 receptions, 62 yards
Illinois	Passing	Luke Altmyer	15/25, 172 yards, 2 TD, INT
Illinois	Rushing	Kaden Feagin	14 carries, 81 yards, TD
Illinois	Receiving	Hudson Clement	3 receptions, 72 yards, 2 TD

=== at Wisconsin ===
No. 21 Illinois Fighting Illini (7–3) at Wisconsin Badgers (3–7) – Game summary

Quarter	1	2	3	4	Total
No. 21 Fighting Illini	0	7	3	0	10
Badgers	7	3	7	10	27

at Camp Randall Stadium • Madison, Wisconsin

- Date: November 22
- Game time: 7:30 p.m.
- Game weather: Clear, 43 °F (6 °C); Wind: SW 13 mph
- Game attendance: 67,876
- Referee: Kole Knueppel
- TV announcers (BTN): Rhett Lewis (play-by-play), Anthony Herron (analyst), and Dannie Rogers (sideline reporter)

Game information

First quarter

- WIS – Vinny Anthony II 6-yard run (Nathanial Vakos kick), 1:21. Wisconsin 7–0. 16 plays, 80 yards, 9:30.

Second quarter

- ILL – Luke Altmyer 12-yard run (David Olano kick), 5:45. Tie 7–7. 7 plays, 55 yards, 3:08.
- WIS – Nathanial Vakos 47-yard field goal, 0:14. Wisconsin 10–7. 5 plays, 17 yards, 0:36.

Third quarter

- WIS – Darrion Dupree 84-yard run (Nathanial Vakos kick), 9:40. Wisconsin 17–7. 2 plays, 84 yards, 0:10.
- ILL – David Olano 24-yard field goal, 1:23. Wisconsin 17–10. 10 plays, 67 yards, 4:30.

Fourth quarter

- WIS – Darrion Dupree 4-yard run (Nathanial Vakos kick), 8:16. Wisconsin 24–10. 4 plays, 14 yards, 1:56.
- WIS – Nathanial Vakos 32-yard field goal, 4:23. Wisconsin 27–10. 7 plays, 31 yards, 2:24.

Statistics	ILL	WIS
First downs	19	14
Plays–yards	64-298	69-301
Rushes–yards	29-50	44-209
Passing yards	248	92
Passing: comp–att–int	21-35-0	11-15-0
Turnovers	0	0
Time of possession	28:15	31:45

Team	Category	Player	Statistics
Illinois	Passing	Luke Altmyer	21/35, 248 yards
Illinois	Rushing	Luke Altmyer	13 carries, 20 yards, TD
Illinois	Receiving	Collin Dixon	3 receptions, 62 yards
Wisconsin	Passing	Carter Smith	9/11, 75 yards
Wisconsin	Rushing	Darrion Dupree	17 carries, 131 yards, 2 TD
Wisconsin	Receiving	Trech Kekahuna	5 receptions, 39 yards

=== vs Northwestern (rivalry) ===
Northwestern Wildcats (6–5) at Illinois Fighting Illini (7–4) – Game summary

Quarter	1	2	3	4	Total
Wildcats	3	7	0	3	13
Fighting Illini	0	14	3	3	20

at Gies Memorial Stadium • Champaign, Illinois

- Date: November 29
- Game time: 6:30 p.m.
- Game weather:
- Game attendance: 53,317
- Referee: Chris Coyte
- TV announcers (FOX): Connor Onion (play-by-play) and Mark Helfrich (analyst)

Game information

First quarter

- NU – Jack Olsen 38-yard field goal, 0:16. Wildcats 3–0. Drive: 15 plays, 63 yards, 9:18.

Second quarter

- ILL – Ca'Lil Valentine 6-yard run (David Olano kick), 11:27. Fighting Illini 7–3. Drive: 7 plays, 83 yards, 3:43.
- NU – Hayden Eligon II 13-yard pass from Preston Stone (Jack Olsen kick), 5:50. Wildcats 10–7. Drive: 10 plays, 75 yards, 5:37.
- ILL – Kaden Feagin 1-yard run (David Olano kick), 0:30. Fighting Illini 14–10. Drive: 4 plays, 48 yards, 1:09.

Third quarter

- ILL – David Olano 47-yard field goal, 7:23. Fighting Illini 17–10. Drive: 9 plays, 41 yards, 6:02.

Fourth quarter

- NU – Jack Olsen 26-yard field goal, 7:46. Fighting Illini 17–13. Drive: 4 plays, -7 yards, 1:36.
- ILL – David Olano 27-yard field goal, 3:00. Fighting Illini 20–13. Drive: 4 plays, 9 yards, 2:19.

Statistics	NU	ILL
First downs	19	14
Plays–yards	65-254	52-284
Rushes–yards	29-91	36-120
Passing yards	163	164
Passing: comp–att–int	19-36-3	11-16-0
Turnovers	4	1
Time of possession	30:34	29:26

Team	Category	Player	Statistics
Northwestern	Passing	Preston Stone	19/36, 163 yards, TD, 3 INT
Northwestern	Rushing	Robby Preckel	22 carries, 82 yards
Northwestern	Receiving	Hayden Eligon II	8 receptions, 99 yards, TD
Illinois	Passing	Luke Altmyer	10/15, 136 yards
Illinois	Rushing	Ca'Lil Valentine	14 carries, 74 yards, TD
Illinois	Receiving	Collin Dixon	2 receptions, 53 yards

=== vs. Tennessee (Music City Bowl) ===
2025 Liberty Mutual Music City Bowl
Tennessee Volunteers (8-4) vs. Illinois Fighting Illini (8-4) – Game summary

Quarter	1	2	3	4	Total
Volunteers	7	0	7	14	28
Fighting Illini	7	3	14	6	30

at Nissan Stadium • Nashville, TN

- Date: December 30
- Game time: 4:30 p.m. CST
- Game weather: Clear • Temperature: 34 °F (1 °C) • Wind: 7 mph (11 km/h) northwest
- Game attendance: 52,815
- Referee: Riley Johnson (ACC)
- TV announcers (ESPN): Tom Hart (play-by-play), Jordan Rodgers (analyst) and Cole Cubelic (sideline)

Game information

First quarter

- (5:16) TENN – Joey Aguilar 7-yard run (Max Gilbert kick) (11 plays, 67 yards, 4:59; TENN 7–0)
- (0:36) ILL – Justin Bowick 18-yard pass from Luke Altmayer (David Olano kick) (9 plays, 75 yards, 5:40; 7–7)

Second quarter

- (0:21) ILL – David Olano 30-yard field goal (12 plays, 67 yards, 3:07; ILL 10–7)

Third quarter

- (0:21) ILL – Leon Lowery Jr. fumble recovery (David Olano kick) (ILL 17–7)
- (7:31) TENN – DeSean Bishop 1-yard run (Max Gilbert kick) (9 plays, 75 yards, 4:17; ILL 17–14)
- (2:41) TENN – Luke Altmayer 2-yard run (David Olano kick) (8 plays, 68 yards, 4:44; ILL 24–14)

Fourth quarter

- (11:40) TENN – DeSean Bishop 12-yard run (Max Gilbert kick) (14 plays, 79 yards, 5:52; ILL 24–21)
- (5:14) ILL – David Olano 28-yard field goal (12 plays, 65 yards, 6:26; ILL 27–21)
- (4:58) TENN – Joakim Dodson 94-yard kickoff return (Max Gilbert kick) (1 plays, 94 yards, 0:00; TENN 28–27)
- (0:03) ILL – David Olano 29-yard field goal (13 plays, 65 yards, 4:58; ILL 30–28)

Statistics	TENN	ILL
First downs	18	27
Plays–yards	55–278	73–417
Rushes–yards	37–157	39–221
Passing yards	121	196
Passing: Comp–Att–Int	14–18–0	20–34–0
Turnovers	1	0
Time of possession	24:14	35:46

Team	Category	Player	Statistics
Tennessee	Passing	Joey Aguilar	14/18, 121 yards
Tennessee	Rushing	DeSean Bishop	19 carries, 93 yards
Tennessee	Receiving	Mike Matthews	3 receptions, 43 yards
Illinois	Passing	Luke Altmyer	20/33, 196 yards, TD
Illinois	Rushing	Aidan Laughery	13 carries, 77 yards
Illinois	Receiving	Hudson Clement	3 receptions, 48 yards

== Roster ==
2025 Illinois Fighting Illini football team roster
Players
Coaches
Offense

Pos.	#	Name	Class
WR	0	Justin Bowick	Jr
WR	1	Mario Sanders II	Jr
WR	2	Ashton Hollins	Jr
RB	3	Kaden Feagin	Jr
QB	4	Carson Boyd	Fr
RB	5	Ca'lil Valentine	So
WR	7	Alexander Capka-Jones	Sr
WR	8	Malik Elzy	Jr
QB	9	Luke Altmyer	Sr
QB	10	Ethan Hampton	Sr
WR	11	Brayden Trimble	Fr
QB	12	Trey Petty	Fr
WR	13	Hudson Clement	Jr
TE	14	Cole Rusk	Sr
QB	15	Jershaun Newton	Fr
TE	16	Logan Farrell	Fr
WR	17	Collin Dixon	So
WR	18	Michael Bartolotta	Sr
RB	20	John Forster (injured)	Fr
RB	21	Aidan Laughery	Jr
RB	22	Cedric Wyche II	Fr
TE	23	Jordan Anderson	Jr
RB	25	Aaron Ball	Fr
RB	27	Corey Rashad	So
WR	28	Karson Kaiser	Fr
RB	31	Murphy Clement	Fr
TE	39	Trey Peters	Fr
OL	54	Griffin Rousseau	Fr
OL	55	T. J. McMillen	So
OL	56	J. J. Hirdes	Fr
OL	57	Zach Barrett	Fr
OL	58	Melvin Priestly	Sr
OL	63	Dezmond Schuster	Sr
OL	64	Josh Kreutz	Sr
OL	65	Kellen Francis	So
OL	66	Brandon Hansen	So
OL	68	Michael McDonough	Fr
OL	70	Tyler McMillan	Jr
OL	71	Nathan Knapik	Fr
OL	72	Ayden Knapik	Sr
OL	73	Josh Gesky	Sr
OL	74	J. C. Davis	Sr
OL	75	Brandon Henderson	Jr
OL	76	Dylan Frechette	Fr
OL	78	Eddie Tuerk	Fr
OL	79	Zafir Stewart	Fr
WR	80	Hank Beatty	Sr
TE	82	Jake Furtney	Fr
WR	83	Tysean Griffin	Fr
TE	84	Grant Smith	Fr
TE	85	Tanner Arkin	Sr
TE	86	Christian Abney	Jr
WR	87	Tyler McClure	Sr
TE	88	Davin Stoffel	So
TE	89	Tanner Hollinger	Fr

Defense

Pos.	#	Name	Class
DB	0	Mac Resetich	Jr
DB	1	Kaleb Patterson	Jr
DB	2	Saboor Karriem	Jr
OLB	3	Alec Bryant	Sr
OLB	4	Daniel Brown	Jr
DB	5	Torrie Cox Jr.	Sr
DB	6	Jaheim Clarke	Jr
DB	7	Matthew Bailey	Jr
DL	8	Jeremiah Warren	So
OLB	9	Leon Lowery Jr.	Sr
DB	10	Miles Scott	Sr
DB	11	Donovan Turner	Jr
DB	12	Amar Reynolds	Fr
DB	13	Xanai Scott	Fr
DB	14	Xavier Scott	Sr
DB	15	Andre Lovett Jr.	Fr
DB	16	Tanner Heckel	So
OLB	17	Gabe Jacas	Sr
OLB	18	Mason Muragin	So
DB	19	Tyson Rooks	Jr
DB	20	Tyler Strain	Sr
DB	21	Ben Clawson	Jr
DB	22	R. J. Jones III	Fr
DB	24	Vernon Woodward III	Fr
DB	25	Des Straughton	Fr
OLB	26	Ismael Kante	Jr
LB	28	Dylan Rosiek	Sr
LB	29	T. J. Griffin	Jr
LB	30	JoJo Hayden	So
DB	32	Tywan Cox	Fr
LB	33	Grant Beerman	Fr
OLB	34	Erik Gayle	Fr
DB	35	Grayson Griffin	Sr
DL	36	Tomiwa Durojaiye	Jr
LB	38	Jack Paris	Fr
LB	39	Kenenna Odeluga	Sr
LB	41	James Kruetz	Jr
LB	42	Luke Zardzin	Sr
OLB	43	Joe Barna	So
DL	44	Angelo McCullom	So
LB	45	Malachi Hood	Jr
LB	47	Easton Baker	Fr
OLB	48	Carter Smith	Fr
OLB	51	Clayton Leonard	Jr
DL	52	Pat Farrell	So
DL	54	Demetrius John	Fr
DL	56	Guillermo Gallardo	Jr
DL	90	James Thompson Jr.	Sr
DL	91	Cameron Brooks	Fr
DL	92	Gentle Hunt	Sr
DL	94	Carter Hewitt	Sr
DL	95	Isaiah White	Fr
DL	96	Eli Coenen	So
DL	99	Curt Neal	Jr

Special teams

Pos.	#	Name	Class
K	24	David Olano	Jr
K/P	27	Lucas Osada	So
LS	36	Lane Hansen	Sr
P	40	Keelan Crimmins	Sr
LS	44	Patrick Mahoney III	So
P	81	Lars Rau	So

Head coach

- Bret Bielema

Coordinators/assistant coaches

- Thad Ward – Assistant head coach/running backs
- Barry Lunney Jr. – Offensive coordinator/quarterbacks
- Aaron Henry – Defensive coordinator/secondary
- Terrance Jamison – Co-defensive coordinator/defensive line
- Robby Discher – Special teams coordinator/tight ends
- Archie McDaniel – Linebackers
- Bart Miller – Offensive line
- Corey Parker – Defensive backs
- Justin Stepp – Wide receivers
- Trent Harris – Outside linebackers
- Ben Miller – Senior head coach analyst
- Myers Hendrickson – Senior analyst
- Mike Neu – Senior offensive assistant
- Joe Kim – Skill development coordinator
- Chris Hurd – Senior special teams assistant
- Alex Panos – Assistant outside linebackers
- Artur Sitkowski – Assistant quarterbacks
- Byron Bell – Assistant offensive line
- Danny Cameron – Assistant tight ends
- Matt Ellerbrock – Assistant linebackers
- Dan Ellington – Assistant wide receivers
- Houston Griffith – Assistant defensive backs
- Antonio James – Assistant defensive line
- Ryan Simerson – Assistant secondary
- James White – Assistant running backs
- Harper Cole – Offensive skill and special teams assistant
- Blake Smithback – Offensive front assistant
- Tank Wright – Director, Strength and Conditioning
- G. C. Yerry – Associate Director, Strength and Conditioning
- Matt Manninger – Assistant, Strength and Conditioning
- Nick Elicone – Assistant, Strength and Conditioning
- Tyler Mayo – Assistant, Strength and Conditioning

Legend

- (C) Team captain
- (S) Suspended
- (I) Ineligible
- Injured
- Redshirt

Roster
Last update: 9/25/2025
