= Cookie Brinkman =

American football player (1953–2019)

No. 47
- Position: Wide receiver

Personal information
- Born: May 26, 1949; Cincinnati, Ohio, U.S.
- Died: October 24, 2019 (aged 70)
- Listed height: 6 ft 2 in (1.88 m)
- Listed weight: 208 lb (94 kg)

Career information
- High school: Roger Bacon (St. Bernard, Ohio)
- College: Louisville (1967–1970)
- NFL draft: 1971: undrafted

Career history
- Cincinnati Bengals (1971)*; Cleveland Browns (1971–1972); Buffalo Bills (1973–1974)*
- * Offseason or practice squad member only

Awards and highlights
- First-team All-MVC (1970)

Career NFL statistics
- Games played: 1
- Stats at Pro Football Reference

Charles William "Cookie" Brinkman (May 26, 1949 – October 24, 2019) was an American professional football wide receiver.

A Cincinnati native, Brinkman played football and golf at Roger Bacon High School. He played college football for the Louisville Cardinals, where he emerged as one of the top receivers in the Missouri Valley Conference (MVC). As a senior in 1970, Brinkman earned first-team all-MVC honors and an All-American honorable mention recognition from the Associated Press after leading his team to a conference title.

After going unselected in the 1971 NFL draft, Brinkman joined the Cincinnati Bengals, but was released before the start of the season. Following a short stint with the Cleveland Browns, he rejoined the team in 1972 and appeared in one game for Cleveland that season. Brinkman finished his career a member of the Buffalo Bills from 1973 to 1974.

== Early life ==
Brinkman was born on May 26, 1949, in Cincinnati, Ohio, to Joseph and Helen Brinkman. His father played minor league baseball in the St. Louis Cardinals farm system until a broken hand ended his career.

Brinkman attended Roger Bacon High School in Cincinnati, starring on the school's football team under head coach Bron Bacevich. He played at defensive back until he gained 50 lbs as a senior and transitioned to a wide receiver. Brinkman was also a standout in golf, earning all-city honors after helping his team win the Greater Cincinnati League title as a senior. He accepted a grant-in-aid scholarship to play college football at Louisville, following in the footsteps of his brother Gerard.

== College career ==
Brinkman played for the freshman team at Louisville in 1967. He joined the varsity team as a sophomore, playing the tight end position. Brinkman also took over punting duties after an injury to Wally Oyler. In his punting debut, he recorded punts of 59 and 47 yards. The following week, Brinkman recorded an 89-yard punt against Tulsa which pinned them inside the 10-yard line and resulted in a safety a few plays later. Louisville head coach Frank Camp called his punt "the turning point" of their 16–7 victory. It set a new school record, far surpassing the previous mark of 65 yards, and ended up being the longest punt in the nation that season. Brinkman was named the Missouri Valley Conference (MVC) offensive player of the week for his performance. As a junior in 1969, Brinkman emerged as Louisville's leading receiver, making 25 catches for 357 yards and five touchdowns. He caught two touchdowns in a 31–21 defeat to his hometown team, Cincinnati.

Ahead of his senior season, Brinkman was elected team captain by his teammates. The Cardinals were picked to finish last in the conference in the coaches' preseason poll. However, they won the conference title after going undefeated in conference play. Louisville earned a berth to the Pasadena Bowl, where Brinkman seemingly caught the game-winning touchdown pass from Cardinals running back Tom Jesukaitis on a broken play, though it was called back due to an illegal forward pass. The game ended in a 24–24 tie. Brinkman finished his senior season with a team-high 48 catches for 647 yards and four touchdowns, earning a unanimous selection to the all-MVC team as well as honorable mention All-American honors from the Associated Press. He also recorded 26 punts for 853 yards, averaging 32.8 yards per punt. Brinkman was named the team's most outstanding senior.

== Professional career ==
After going unselected in the 1971 NFL draft, Brinkman was signed by the Cincinnati Bengals as an undrafted free agent. However, he did not make the final roster, as he was cut in July. Brinkman signed with the Cleveland Browns soon afterwards and was converted from a tight end to a wide receiver. He caught a 42-yard pass from Bill Nelsen in a preseason win over the New York Giants. Brinkman was placed on the Browns' practice squad a few days later. He was cut two weeks later, however, due to the acquisition of another receiver, Frank Pitts.

After cutting his weight and improving his speed, Brinkman was invited back to try out for the Cleveland Browns in 1972. He was released on September 12 during final roster cuts and signed to the practice squad. Brinkman was activated in December for one game against the Cincinnati Bengals. He recorded no statistics and returned to the practice squad.

In May 1973, Brinkman signed with the Buffalo Bills. He blocked a Chester Marcol field goal attempt in a preseason loss to the Green Bay Packers. However, he broke his arm the following week in the kickoff of their game against the Washington Redskins and was placed on injured reserve. Brinkman participated in the 1974 NFL strike, picketing with several of his Bills' teammates. He attended unofficial "bootleg training camp" workouts hosted by team veterans in July. On August 6, Brinkman became the second Bills veteran to report to training camp, after Bo Cornell. In explaining his decision, he said: "I'm putting more on the line than anybody else on the team. I'm losing my job by staying out of camp and I know it." Brinkman, who was trying out as a safety, was waived a few weeks later.

== Personal life ==
Brinkman was given the nickname "Cookie" by his older brother Gerard, who was 18 months older and could not properly pronounce "Charlie". He also had two younger brothers named Joey and Jimmy. A cousin of his, Jacob Ungruhe, played football at Morehead State.

Brinkman married Amy Dalli and they had two children: Charles and Melissa. Their son, Charles "Chip" Brinkman, was a star football and basketball player at Clearwater Central Catholic High School in Clearwater, Florida, before playing college football at Wake Forest.

Brinkman served as the vice president of marketing at ASI Building Products in Tampa, Florida, and later became the vice president of sales at Alcoa. He died on October 24, 2019.
