= Adrian Breen =

Adrian Breen may refer to:

- Adrian Breen (hurler) (born 1992), Irish hurler
- Adrian Breen (American football) (born 1965), American football quarterback
