= 2025 Western Illinois Leathernecks football team =

American college football season

2025 Western Illinois Leathernecks football
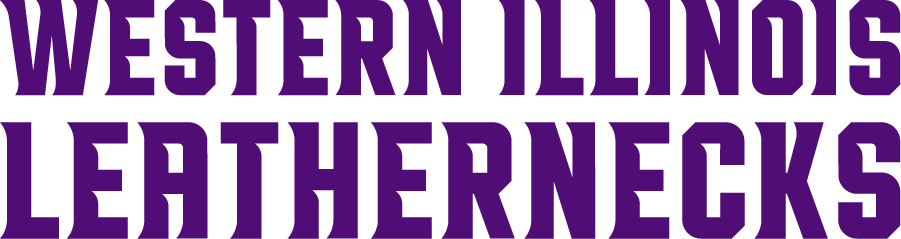
- Conference: OVC–Big South Football Association
- Record: 4–8 (3–5 OVC–Big South)
- Head coach: Joe Davis (2nd season)
- Offensive coordinator: Brad Wilson (2nd season)
- Defensive coordinator: Landon Fox (1st season)
- Home stadium: Hanson Field

2025 OVC–Big South football standings
	Conf.			Overall
Team	W		L	W		L
No. 16 Tennessee Tech $^	8	–	0	11	–	2
UT Martin	6	–	2	6	–	6
Gardner–Webb	5	–	3	7	–	5
Lindenwood	5	–	3	6	–	6
Charleston Southern	4	–	4	5	–	7
Southeast Missouri State	3	–	5	4	–	8
Western Illinois	3	–	5	4	–	8
Eastern Illinois	2	–	6	3	–	8
Tennessee State	0	–	8	2	–	10
$ – Conference champion; ^ – FCS playoff participant; Rankings from STATS Poll

The 2025 Western Illinois Leathernecks football team represented Western Illinois University as a member of the Big South–OVC Football Association during the 2025 NCAA Division I FCS football season. Led by second-year head coach Joe Davis the Leathernecks compiled an overall record of 4–8 with a mark of 3–5 in conference play, tying for sixth place in the Big South–OVC.

== Schedule ==
Date	Time	Opponent	Site	TV	Result	Attendance
August 29	6:30 p.m.	at No. 12 (FBS) Illinois*	Memorial Stadium; Champaign, IL	Peacock	L 3–52	56,040
September 5	6:30 p.m.	at Northwestern*	Martin Stadium; Evanston, IL	BTN	L 7–42	9,647
September 13	6:00 p.m.	Valparaiso*	Hanson Field; Macomb, IL	ESPN+	W 51–30	572
September 20	6:00 p.m.	at Eastern Washington*	Roos Field; Cheney, WA	ESPN+	L 31–52	5,301
September 27	3:00 p.m.	Eastern Illinois	Hanson Field; Macomb, IL	ESPN+	L 23–31	2,183
October 4	12:00 p.m.	at No. 11 Tennessee Tech	Tucker Stadium; Cookeville, TN	ESPN+	L 20–66	5,108
October 11	2:00 p.m.	at UT Martin	Graham Stadium; Martin, TN	ESPN+	L 31–32	6,216
October 18	3:00 p.m.	Charleston Southern	Hanson Field; Macomb, IL	ESPN+	L 24–29	3,000
October 25	1:30 p.m.	at Tennessee State	Nissan Stadium; Nashville, TN	ESPN+	W 17–16	1,129
November 8	1:00 p.m.	Lindenwood	Hanson Field; Macomb, IL	ESPN+	W 24–21	2,004
November 15	1:00 p.m.	Southeast Missouri State	Hanson Field; Macomb, IL	ESPN+	L 17–22	2,000
November 22	12:30 p.m.	at Gardner–Webb	Ernest W. Spangler Stadium; Boiling Springs, NC	ESPN+	W 29–24	2,769
*Non-conference game; Rankings from STATS Poll released prior to the game; All times are in Central time

== Preseason ==
=== Preseason poll ===
The Big South-OVC Conference released their preseason poll on July 16, 2025. The Leathernecks were picked to finish fifth in the conference.

== Game summaries ==
=== at No. 12 (FBS) Illinois ===
Game One – Western Illinois Leathernecks (0–0) at No. 12 (FBS) Illinois Fighting Illini (0–0) – Game summary

Quarter	1	2	3	4	Total
Leathernecks	0	0	0	3	3
No. 12 Fighting Illini (FBS)	14	17	7	14	52

at Memorial Stadium • Champaign, IL

- Date: Friday August 29, 2025
- Game time: 6:30 p.m.
- Game weather: Sunny • Temperature: 72 °F (22 °C) • Wind: SW at 6 miles per hour (9.7 km/h)
- Game attendance: 56,040
- Referee: Andrew Speciale
- TV announcers (Peacock): Paul Burmeister (play-by-play), Phil Simms (analyst), and Zora Stephenson (sideline reporter)

Game information

First quarter

- (6:43) ILL – Tanner Arkin 3-yard pass from Luke Altmyer (David Olano kick) (Drive: 8 plays, 59 yards, 4:14; Illinois 7–0)
- (3:48) ILL – Justin Bowick 3-yard pass from Luke Altmyer (David Olano kick) (Drive: 5 plays, 26 yards, 2:48; Illinois 14–0)

Second quarter

- (13:20) ILL – Aidan Laughery 25-yard run (David Olano kick) (Drive: 7 plays, 51 yards, 3:43; Illinois 21–0)
- (7:54) ILL – David Olano 35-yard field goal (Drive: 8 plays, 49 yards, 3:25; Illinois 24–0)
- (3:09) ILL – Justin Bowick 13-yard pass from Luke Altmyer (David Olano kick) (Drive: 4 plays, 62 yards, 2:34; Illinois 31–0)

Third quarter

- (8:00) ILL – Hank Beatty 69-yard punt return (David Olano kick) (Drive: 3 plays, 1 yard, 2:13; Illinois 38–0)

Fourth quarter

- (14:57) WIU – Antonio Chadha 20-yard field goal (Drive: 16 plays, 73 yards, 8:03; Illinois 38–3)
- (8:27) ILL – Kaden Feagin 7-yard run (David Olano kick) (Drive: 10 plays, 75 yards, 6:30; Illinois 45–3)
- (5:27) ILL – Aidan Laughery 57-yard run (David Olano kick) (Drive: 2 plays, 67 yards, 0:55; Illinois 52–3)

Statistics	WIU	ILL
First downs	11	21
Plays–yards	56–163	61–440
Rushes–yards	26–29	37–209
Passing yards	134	231
Passing: comp–att–int	14–29–0	18–22–0
Turnovers	1	0
Time of possession	27:18	32:42

Team	Category	Player	Statistics
Western Illinois	Passing	Chris Irvin	14/29, 134 yards
Western Illinois	Rushing	Markell Holman	12 carries, 20 yards
Western Illinois	Receiving	Demari Davis	4 receptions, 65 yards
Illinois	Passing	Luke Altmyer	17/21, 217 yards, 3 TD
Illinois	Rushing	Aidan Laughery	9 carries, 101 yards, 2 TD
Illinois	Receiving	Hank Beatty	5 receptions, 108 yards

=== at Northwestern (FBS) ===
Game Two – Western Illinois Leathernecks (0–1) at Northwestern Wildcats (FBS) (0–1) – Game summary

Quarter	1	2	3	4	Total
Leathernecks	0	0	0	7	7
Wildcats (FBS)	15	7	6	14	42

at Martin Stadium • Evanston, IL

- Date: Friday September 5, 2025
- Game time: 6:30 p.m.
- Game weather: Cloudy, 65 °F (18 °C)
- Game attendance: 9,647
- Referee: Jeremy Valentine
- TV announcers (BTN): Joe Beninati (play-by-play), Matt Millen (analyst), and Kylen Mills (sideline reporter)

Game information

First quarter

- (11:58) NU – Cam Porter 43-yard run (Luke Akers kick). Northwestern 7–0. Drive: 6 plays, 30 yards, 3:02
- (6:44) NU – Hayden Eligon II 5-yard pass from Preston Stone (Lawson Albright run). Northwestern 15–0. Drive: 5 plays, 73 yards, 3:09

Second quarter

- (0:28) NU – Hunter Welcing 6-yard pass from Preston Stone (Luke Akers kick). Northwestern 22–0. Drive: 13 plays, 77 yards, 3:34

Third quarter

- (7:06) NU – Luke Akers 35-yard field goal. Northwestern: 25–0. Drive: 9 plays, 53 yards, 4:13
- (1:40) NU – Luke Akers 25-yard field goal. Northwestern: 28–0. Drive: 7 plays, 64 yards, 4:17

Fourth quarter

- (10:43) NU – Drew Wagner 4-yard pass from Preston Stone (Jack Olsen kick). Northwestern 35–0. Drive: 10 plays, 53 yards, 5:27
- (7:07) NU – Ryan Boe 58-yard run (Jack Olsen kick). Northwestern 42–0. Drive: 3 plays, 67 yards, 1:32
- (2:47) WIU – Christian Anaya 8-yard pass from Cason Carswell (Antonio Chadha kick). Northwestern 42–7. Drive: 10 plays, 67 yards, 4:20

Statistics	WIU	NU
First downs	10	24
Plays–yards	50–181	70–526
Rushes–yards	23–71	41–281
Passing yards	110	245
Passing: Comp–Att–Int	12–27–1	21–29–0
Turnovers	1	1
Time of possession	24:06	35:54

Team	Category	Player	Statistics
Western Illinois	Passing	Cason Carswell	6/8, 52 yards, TD
Western Illinois	Rushing	Markell Holman	13 carries, 52 yards
Western Illinois	Receiving	Demari Davis	3 receptions, 46 yards
Northwestern	Passing	Preston Stone	21/29, 245 yards, 3 TD
Northwestern	Rushing	Cam Porter	12 carries, 91 yards, TD
Northwestern	Receiving	Griffin Wilde	5 receptions, 94 yards

=== vs. Valparaiso ===
Game Three – Valparaiso Beacons (1–1) at Western Illinois Leathernecks (0–2) – Game summary

Quarter	1	2	3	4	Total
Beacons	0	0	0	0	0
Leathernecks	0	0	0	0	0

at Hanson Field • Macomb, IL

- Date: Saturday September 13, 2025
- Game time: 6:00 p.m.
- TV announcers (ESPN+): Russ Eisenstein (play-by-play), Aiden Dersien (analyst) and Caiden Strenz (sideline)

Game information

First quarter
Second quarter
Third quarter
Fourth quarter

Statistics	VAL	WIU
First downs	15	29
Total yards	316	570
Rushing yards	124	306
Passing yards	192	264
Passing: Comp–Att–Int	15-26-0	14-22-2
Time of possession	30:26	29:34

Team	Category	Player	Statistics
Valparaiso	Passing	Caron Tyler	10/16, 137 yards, 1 TD
Valparaiso	Rushing	Caron Tyler	12 carries, 79 yards
Valparaiso	Receiving	Chris Gundy	5 receptions, 86 yards, 1 TD
Western Illinois	Passing	Chris Irvin	13/19, 250 yards, 3 TD, 1 INT
Western Illinois	Rushing	Markell Holman	19 carries, 139 yards, 1 TD
Western Illinois	Receiving	Demari Davis	4 receptions, 99 yards, 1 TD

=== at Eastern Washington ===
Game Four – Western Illinois Leathernecks (1–2) at Eastern Washington Eagles (0–3) – Game summary

Quarter	1	2	3	4	Total
Leathernecks	3	14	7	7	31
Eagles	15	12	10	15	52

at Roos Field • Cheney, WA

- Date: Saturday September 20, 2025
- Game time: 6:00 pm CDT
- Game weather: Sunny • Temperature: 83 °F (28 °C)
- Game attendance: 5,301
- Referee: Gregg Wilson
- TV announcers (ESPN+): Austin Getz (play-by-play) and Bill Ames (analyst)

Game information

First quarter

- EWU – Jaxon Branch 35-yard pass from Nate Bell (Nate Bell–Landon Cooper pass), 7:57. Eagles 8–0. Drive: 7 plays, 52 yards, 2:53.
- WIU – Antonio Chadha 39-yard field goal, 2:37. Eagles 8–3. Drive: 8 plays, 26 yards, 3:05.
- EWU – Landon Cooper 64-yard pass from Nate Bell (Hunter McKee kick), 1:31. Eagles 15–3. Drive: 4 plays, 75 yards, 1:06.

Second quarter

- WIU – Christian Anaya 14-yard pass from Chris Irvin (Antonio Chadha kick), 14:54. Eagles 15–10. Drive: 5 plays, 75 yards, 1:37.
- EWU – Wesley Garrett 67-yard run (Hunter McKee kick failed), 9:39. Eagles 21–10. Drive: 6 plays, 95 yards, 2:41.
- WIU – Markell Holman 2-yard run (Antonio Chadha kick), 3:17. Eagles 21–17. Drive: 5 plays, 35 yards, 2:11.
- EWU – Nate Bell 2-yard run (Soren McKee kick failed), 0:52. Eagles 27–17. Drive: 2 plays, 48 yards, 0:13.

Third quarter

- EWU – Marceese Yetts 4-yard run (Soren McKee kick), 14:27. Eagles 34–17. Drive: 1 play, 4 yards, 0:05.
- WIU – Christian Anaya 3-yard pass from Chris Irvin (Antonio Chadha kick), 10:43. Eagles 34–24. Drive: 8 plays, 64 yards, 3:37.
- EWU – Soren McKee 23-yard field goal, 1:52. Eagles 37–24. Drive: 9 plays, 70 yards, 3:35.

Fourth quarter

- WIU – Chris Irvin 4-yard run (Antonio Chadha kick), 12:29. Eagles 37–31. Drive: 10 plays, 75 yards, 4:18.
- EWU – Nate Bell 6-yard run (Nate Bell–Noah Cronquist pass), 11:11. Eagles 45–31. Drive: 5 plays, 75 yards, 1:18.
- EWU – Nate Bell 9-yard run (Soren McKee kick), 7:05. Eagles 52–31. Drive: 5 plays, 32 yards, 1:54.

Statistics	WIU	EWU
First downs	22	22
Plays–yards	82–358	71–597
Rushes–yards	39–150	42–325
Passing yards	208	272
Passing: Comp–Att–Int	21-43-1	11-29-2
Turnovers	1	2
Time of possession	32:22	27:38

Team	Category	Player	Statistics
Western Illinois	Passing	Chris Irvin	16/34, 167 yards, 2 TD, INT
Western Illinois	Rushing	Markell Holman	28 carries, 118 yards, TD
Western Illinois	Receiving	Tristin Duncan	5 receptions, 110 yards
Eastern Washington	Passing	Nate Bell	11/29, 272 yards, 2 TD, 2 INT
Eastern Washington	Rushing	Nate Bell	18 carries, 144 yards, 3 TD
Eastern Washington	Receiving	Miles Williams	3 receptions, 78 yards

=== vs. Eastern Illinois ===
Game Five – Eastern Illinois Panthers (1–2) at Western Illinois Leathernecks (1–3) – Game summary

Quarter	1	2	3	4	Total
Panthers	7	14	0	10	31
Leathernecks	0	6	10	7	23

at Hanson Field • Macomb, IL

- Date: Saturday September 27, 2025
- Game time: 3:00 p.m.
- TV announcers (ESPN+): Russ Eisenstein (play-by-play), Aiden Dersien (analyst) and Caden Strenz (sideline)

Game information

First quarter
Second quarter
Third quarter
Fourth quarter

Statistics	EIU	WIU
First downs	16	23
Total yards	329	326
Rushing yards	239	124
Passing yards	90	202
Passing: Comp–Att–Int	4-10-1	27-42-0
Time of possession	24:45	35:15

Team	Category	Player	Statistics
Eastern Illinois	Passing	Connor Wolf	4/10, 90 yards, 1 INT
Eastern Illinois	Rushing	Jacarre Fleming	9 carries, 111 yards, 2 TD
Eastern Illinois	Receiving	DeAirious Smith	1 receptions, 33 yards
Western Illinois	Passing	Cason Carswell	16/22, 118 yards, 2 TD
Western Illinois	Rushing	Markell Holman	23 carries, 91 yards
Western Illinois	Receiving	Tristrin Duncan	10 receptions, 78 yards

=== at No. 11 Tennessee Tech ===
Game Six – Western Illinois Leathernecks (1–4) at No. 11 Tennessee Tech Golden Eagles (4–0) – Game summary

Quarter	1	2	3	4	Total
Leathernecks	7	10	3	0	20
No. 11 Golden Eagles	10	28	14	14	66

at Tucker Stadium • Cookeville, TN

- Date: Saturday October 4, 2025
- Game time: 12:00 p.m.
- TV announcers (ESPN+): TBA

Game information

First quarter
Second quarter
Third quarter
Fourth quarter

Statistics	WIU	TNTC
First downs	18	27
Total yards	375	618
Rushing yards	32	166
Passing yards	343	452
Passing: Comp–Att–Int	34-49-1	25-39-0
Time of possession	32:15	27:45

Team	Category	Player	Statistics
Western Illinois	Passing	Cason Carswell	34/49, 343 yards, 2 TD, 1 INT
Western Illinois	Rushing	Markell Holman	10 carries, 37 yards
Western Illinois	Receiving	Christian Anaya	13 receptions, 132 yards
Tennessee Tech	Passing	Kekoa Visperas	23/38, 358 yards, 4 TD
Tennessee Tech	Rushing	Kekoa Visperas	8 carries, 73 yards
Tennessee Tech	Receiving	Noah Robinson	7 receptions, 126 yards, 3 TD

=== at UT Martin ===
Game Seven – Western Illinois Leathernecks (1–5) at UT Martin Skyhawks (1–5) – Game summary

Quarter	1	2	3	4	Total
Leathernecks	7	14	10	0	31
Skyhawks	7	13	0	12	32

at Graham Stadium • Martin, TN

- Date: Saturday October 11, 2025
- Game time: TBA
- TV announcers (ESPN+): TBA

Game information

First quarter
Second quarter
Third quarter
Fourth quarter

Statistics	WIU	UTM
First downs	21	23
Total yards	403	445
Rushing yards	76	200
Passing yards	327	245
Passing: Comp–Att–Int	21-30-0	20-29-0
Time of possession	23:27	36:33

Team	Category	Player	Statistics
Western Illinois	Passing	Carson Carswell	21/30, 327 yards, 2 TD
Western Illinois	Rushing	Markell Holman	16 carries, 59 yards, 2 TD
Western Illinois	Receiving	Demari Davis	4 receptions, 109 yards, 1 TD
UT Martin	Passing	Jase Bauer	19/28, 235 yards, 1 TD
UT Martin	Rushing	John Gentry	15 carries, 104 yards
UT Martin	Receiving	Hyatt Timosciek	4 receptions, 69 yards

=== vs. Charleston Southern ===
Game Eight – Charleston Southern Buccaneers (1–6) at Western Illinois Leathernecks (1–6) – Game summary

Quarter	1	2	3	4	Total
Buccaneers	0	0	0	0	0
Leathernecks	0	0	0	0	0

at Hanson Field • Macomb, IL

- Date: Saturday October 18, 2025
- Game time: TBA
- TV announcers (ESPN+): TBA

Game information

First quarter
Second quarter
Third quarter
Fourth quarter

Statistics	CHSO	WIU
First downs	19	24
Total yards	339	463
Rushing yards	31	88
Passing yards	262	375
Passing: Comp–Att–Int	14-26-0	34-51-1
Time of possession	25:13	34:47

Team	Category	Player	Statistics
Charleston Southern	Passing	Zolten Osborne	14/26, 262 yards, 4 TD
Charleston Southern	Rushing	Hakeem Watters	16 carries, 52 yards
Charleston Southern	Receiving	Rashawn Cunningham	4 receptions, 95 yards, 2 TD
Western Illinois	Passing		
Western Illinois	Rushing		
Western Illinois	Receiving		

Game Nine – Western Illinois Leathernecks (1–7) at Tennessee State Tigers (2–5) – Game summary

Quarter	1	2	3	4	Total
Leathernecks	0	0	0	0	0
Tigers	0	0	0	0	0

at Nissan Stadium • Nashville, TN

- Date: Saturday October 25, 2025
- Game time: TBA
- TV announcers (ESPN+): TBA

Game information

First quarter
Second quarter
Third quarter
Fourth quarter

=== at Tennessee State ===
Statistics	WIU	TNST
First downs		
Total yards		
Rushing yards		
Passing yards		
Passing: Comp–Att–Int		
Time of possession		

Team	Category	Player	Statistics
Western Illinois	Passing		
Western Illinois	Rushing		
Western Illinois	Receiving		
Tennessee State	Passing		
Tennessee State	Rushing		
Tennessee State	Receiving		

=== vs. Lindenwood ===
Game Ten – Lindenwood Lions (4–5) at Western Illinois Leathernecks (2–7) – Game summary

Quarter	1	2	3	4	Total
Lions	0	0	0	0	0
Leathernecks	0	0	0	0	0

at Hanson Field • Macomb, IL

- Date: Saturday November 8, 2025
- Game time: TBA
- TV announcers (ESPN+): TBA

Game information

First quarter
Second quarter
Third quarter
Fourth quarter

Statistics	LIN	WIU
First downs		
Total yards		
Rushing yards		
Passing yards		
Passing: Comp–Att–Int		
Time of possession		

Team	Category	Player	Statistics
Lindenwood	Passing		
Lindenwood	Rushing		
Lindenwood	Receiving		
Western Illinois	Passing		
Western Illinois	Rushing		
Western Illinois	Receiving		

=== vs. Southeast Missouri State ===
Game Eleven – Southeast Missouri State Redhawks (0–0) at Western Illinois Leathernecks (0–0) – Game summary

Quarter	1	2	3	4	Total
Redhawks	0	0	0	0	0
Leathernecks	0	0	0	0	0

at Hanson Field • Macomb, IL

- Date: Saturday August 30, 2025
- Game time: TBA
- TV announcers (ESPN+): TBA

Game information

First quarter
Second quarter
Third quarter
Fourth quarter

Statistics	SEMO	WIU
First downs		
Total yards		
Rushing yards		
Passing yards		
Passing: Comp–Att–Int		
Time of possession		

Team	Category	Player	Statistics
Southeast Missouri State	Passing		
Southeast Missouri State	Rushing		
Southeast Missouri State	Receiving		
Western Illinois	Passing		
Western Illinois	Rushing		
Western Illinois	Receiving		

=== at Gardner–Webb ===
Game Twelve – Western Illinois Leathernecks (0–0) at Gardner–Webb Runnin' Bulldogs (0–0) – Game summary

Quarter	1	2	3	4	Total
Leathernecks	0	0	0	0	0
Runnin' Bulldogs	0	0	0	0	0

at Ernest W. Spangler Stadium • Boiling Springs, NC

- Date: Saturday November 22, 2025
- Game time: TBA
- TV announcers (ESPN+): TBA

Game information

First quarter
Second quarter
Third quarter
Fourth quarter

Statistics	WIU	GWEB
First downs		
Total yards		
Rushing yards		
Passing yards		
Passing: Comp–Att–Int		
Time of possession		

Team	Category	Player	Statistics
Western Illinois	Passing		
Western Illinois	Rushing		
Western Illinois	Receiving		
Gardner–Webb	Passing		
Gardner–Webb	Rushing		
Gardner–Webb	Receiving		

== Personnel ==
=== Transfers ===
==== Outgoing ====
Player	Position	Destination
Cameren Smith	RB	Charlotte
Ryan Merklinger	OL	Chattanooga
Elijah Aragon	WR	Coastal Carolina
Curtis Horras	WR	Grand View
Ludovick Choquette	RB	LIU
Jordan Anderson	DB	Mississippi Valley State
Dallas Parker	WR	New Mexico Highlands
Ryan Crandall	LB	Northern Iowa
Kamal Mukarram	DB	Roosevelt
Jerrod Cameron	DB	UT Permian Basin
Matthew Henry	WR	Western Kentucky
Jeremiah Piper	DB	Youngstown State
Braylen Brooks	DB	Unknown
Torrance Farmer Jr.	RB	Unknown
Noah Epley	LB	Unknown
Jayce Parsons	RB	Unknown
Mills Dawson	QB	Unknown
Isaiah Loera	DB	Unknown

==== Incoming ====
Player	Position	Previous school
Kevin Washington Jr	LB	Bethune–Cookman
Michael Forney	OL	Black Hills State
Wyatt Milkovic	LB	Boise State
Austin Young	LB	Butte
Nigel Cheeks	RB/WR	Ellsworth
Justin Richardson	DB	Georgetown (KY)
Amare Bickham	DB	Iowa
David Dunston	DL	Lackawanna
Brinston Williams	RB	Mississippi State
Esteban Guillory	DB	Murray State
David Borchers	DL	Nebraska
Keith Moko	DB	Northern Iowa
Eric Denham	WR	Portland State
Markell Holman	RB	Saint Francis (PA)
Buju Aumua-Tuisavura	DB	Saint Francis (PA)
Clement Ulale	OL	Southwest Baptist
Matthew Perry	DB	St. Francis (IL)
Steve Oberst	DL	Stetson
Fabian Baez	WR	Stetson
Jerrod Cameron	DB	UMass
LeBron Morgan	DB	UT Martin
AJ Harris	WR	Walsh
T.C. Molk	QB	Walsh
James Durand	OL	Wisconsin

==== Preferred walk-ons ====
Player	Position	Previous school
Troy Mills	LB	California Lutheran
Luke Droegemueller	K/P	Concordia (WI)
Ernest Temple	RB	DuPage
Harlon May	DB	Missouri Southern
Carter Campbell	TE	Ohio Wesleyan
Jaylen Olokun	LB	Roosevelt
Joseph Tumilty	WR	St. Francis (IL)

=== Recruiting class ===
Name	Position	Height	Weight	Hometown	High School
Sage Yazzie	TE	6-5	215	Waukee, IA	Waukee
Cason Carswell	QB	6-3	185	Mason, MI	Mason
Tyler Sulsberger	OL	6-7	295	Hornick, IA	Westwood
Ryan McCombs	OL	6-5	280	Jacksonville, IL	Jacksonville
Morgan Quiri	WR	6-5	175	Tucson, AZ	Salpointe Catholic
Cameron Nickel	LB	6-2	218	Metamora, IL	Metamora
Joe Edwards	LB	6-3	215	Downers Grove, IL	Downers Grove North
Aa'Zoriyon Bonner	DB	6-3	180	Sandusky, OH	Sandusky
Charlie Stec	DL	6-4	225	Orland Park, IL	Brother Rice
Kacper Lobas	K	6-3	185	Summit, IL	Argo Community
Joel Salien	WR	6-0	177	Miami, FL	Immaculata-LaSalle
Luca Siamashvili	OL	6-6	335	Hawthorn Woods, IL	Adlai E. Stevenson
Donpaul Keith	DB	6-2	179	Taylor, MI	River Rouge
Joel Salien	WR	6-0	178	Miami, FL	Immaculata-LaSalle
Tommy Lamberti	OL	6-8	300	Vernon Hills, IL	Carmel Catholic
Jamesly Jean Louis	DL	6-5	246	Immokalee, FL	Immokalee
Justin Buckner	LB	6-0	205	Tinley Park, IL	St. Rita
