= James Thompson Jr. =

American football player (born 2002)

No. 96 – San Francisco 49ers
- Position: Defensive tackle
- Roster status: Active

Personal information
- Born: August 29, 2002 (age 24)
- Listed height: 6 ft 6 in (1.98 m)
- Listed weight: 308 lb (140 kg)

Career information
- High school: Roger Bacon (St. Bernard, Ohio)
- College: Wisconsin (2020–2024); Illinois (2025)
- NFL draft: 2026: undrafted

Career history
- San Francisco 49ers (2026–present)
- Stats at Pro Football Reference

James Thompson Jr. (born August 29, 2002) is an American football defensive tackle for the San Francisco 49ers of the National Football League (NFL). He played college football for Wisconsin Badgers and Illinois Fighting Illini.

== Early life ==
Thompson Jr. attended Roger Bacon High School in St. Bernard, Ohio. He was rated as a three-star recruit and the 64th overall defensive end in the class of 2020 and committed to play college football for the Wisconsin Badgers.

== College career ==
=== Wisconsin ===
As a freshman in 2020, Thompson Jr. played in just one game versus Michigan before suffering a season-ending Achilles injury. In 2021, he played in all 13 games, recording seven tackles. During the 2022 season, Thompson Jr. recorded 26 tackles with six and a half going for a loss and two sacks. In the 2023 season, Thompson Jr. totaled 29 tackles with five and a half being for a loss and three sacks. During the 2024 season, he played in just one game due to a pectoral injury. After the season, Thompson Jr. entered the NCAA transfer portal.

=== Illinois ===
Thompson Jr. transferred to play for the Illinois Fighting Illini. He entered the 2025 season as a starter on the Fighting Illini defensive line.

== Professional career ==
Pre-draft measurables
Height	Weight	Arm length	Hand span	Wingspan	40-yard dash	10-yard split	20-yard split	20-yard shuttle	Three-cone drill	Vertical jump	Broad jump	Bench press
6 ft 5 5/8 in (1.97 m)	308 lb (140 kg)	31 3/8 in (0.80 m)	9 in (0.23 m)	6 ft 7 1/8 in (2.01 m)	5.04 s	1.75 s	2.85 s	4.78 s	7.73 s	28.0 in (0.71 m)	9 ft 2 in (2.79 m)	36 reps
All values from Pro Day

Thompson Jr. signed with the San Francisco 49ers as an undrafted free agent on April 26, 2026.
