= J. C. Davis (American football) =

American football player (born 2003)

No. 74 – New York Giants
- Position: Offensive lineman
- Roster status: Active

Personal information
- Born: October 9, 2003 (age 23)
- Listed height: 6 ft 4 in (1.93 m)
- Listed weight: 322 lb (146 kg)

Career information
- High school: McClymonds (Oakland, California)
- College: Contra Costa (2021); New Mexico (2022–2023); Illinois (2024–2025)
- NFL draft: 2026: 6th round, 192nd overall pick

Career history
- New York Giants (2026–present)

Awards and highlights
- First-team All-CCCAA (2021); First-team All-Mountain West (2023); First-team All-Big Ten (2025); Third-team All-Big Ten (2024)
- Stats at Pro Football Reference

J. C. Davis (born October 9, 2003) is an American professional football offensive lineman for the New York Giants of the National Football League (NFL). He played college football for the Contra Costa Comets, New Mexico Lobos, and Illinois Fighting Illini.

== Early life ==
Davis was born October 9, 2003. He attended McClymonds High School in Oakland, California. Though he primarily played defensive tackle on the school's football team, he was recruited to play college football for the Contra Costa Comets as a left tackle.

== College career ==
In 2021, Davis played college football for the Contra Costa Comets. He earned first-team All-CCCAA honors. He began playing for the New Mexico Lobos in 2022, starting in all 12 games of the season and earning an honorable mention to the All-Mountain West team. In 2023, he was named first-team All-Mountain West after again starting in all 12 games.

After the 2023 season, Davis transferred to play for the Illinois Fighting Illini. He started at offensive tackle in all 13 games and was named third-team All-Big Ten for the 2024 season. Though he had already played four seasons of college football, the typical limit for college athletes, the NCAA granted one extra year of eligibility to athletes like Davis who had previously played a season at a junior college, as Davis had at Contra Costa, following a federal court ruling in a case filed by Diego Pavia. Davis was projected to be a late selection in the 2025 NFL draft but opted to return to Illinois for the 2025 season. He was named first-team All-Big Ten in 2025. Davis declared for the 2026 NFL draft and opted out of the 2025 Music City Bowl.

== Professional career ==
Pre-draft measurables
| Height | Weight | Arm length | Hand span | Wingspan | 40-yard dash | 10-yard split | 20-yard split | 20-yard shuttle | Three-cone drill | Vertical jump | Broad jump |
|---|---|---|---|---|---|---|---|---|---|---|---|
| 6 ft 4 3/8 in (1.94 m) | 322 lb (146 kg) | 34 1/4 in (0.87 m) | 10 1/8 in (0.26 m) | 6 ft 11 1/8 in (2.11 m) | 5.16 s | 1.78 s | 2.99 s | 4.90 s | 7.89 s | 30.5 in (0.77 m) | 8 ft 3 in (2.51 m) |
All values from NFL Combine

Davis was selected by the New York Giants in the sixth round (192nd overall) of the 2026 NFL draft. The Giants previously obtained the selection from the Miami Dolphins in a trade for Darren Waller.
