= Roger Bacon High School =

Location
- 4320 Vine Street; St. Bernard, (Hamilton County), Ohio; 45217-1542; United States; 39°9′46″N 84°30′9″W

Information
- Type: Parochial, Coeducational
- Motto: "In Sanctitate Et Doctrina" (In Holiness and Learning)
- Religious affiliation: Roman Catholic
- Established: 1928
- Oversight: Franciscan
- President: Steve Schad
- Principal: Tim McCoy
- Teaching staff: 36.4 (on an FTE basis)
- Grades: 9–12
- Student to teacher ratio: 13.4
- Colors: Brown and white
- Athletics conference: Miami Valley Conference
- Team name: Spartans
- Newspaper: The Baconian
- Yearbook: The Troubador
- Website: http://www.rogerbacon.org/

Roger Bacon High School is a Catholic high school in St. Bernard, Ohio, based in the Franciscan tradition.

== Early history ==
This high school was dedicated in 1928, and was under the administration of and staffed by the Brothers and Priests of the Order of Friars Minor, and lay men and women. The school was named in honor of Roger Bacon, a Franciscan friar and English philosopher who placed considerable emphasis on empiricism, and has been presented as one of the earliest advocates of the modern scientific method.

Our Lady of Angels High School was the sister school to Roger Bacon, and was located several hundred yards northeast from campus on Bertus Street. OLA was also dedicated in 1928, and due to changing demographics and smaller enrollment, closed its doors for good after the graduating class of 1984. (Google Earth lists OLA, even though the school has closed and the building has been torn down.) That year, Roger Bacon High School became co-educational, and Roger Bacon welcomed the Our Lady of Angels students and alumnae into their family. The class of 1988 was the first four-year co-ed class to graduate from Roger Bacon High School.

== Academics ==
The curriculum is accredited by the Ohio Department of Education and the Ohio Catholic School Accrediting Association.

== Fine Arts ==
The school prides itself on its fine arts program, including a Drama Guild and a rock band, RB3.

== Athletics ==
=== Ohio High School Athletic Association State Championships ===
- Boys' baseball - 1935
- Boys' basketball - 1982, 2002 (notably, the 2002 team handed LeBron James his only loss as a high school player in the championship game)
- Boys' soccer - 1989, 1990
- Girls' basketball - 1995
- Girls' volleyball - 2001, 2004, 2005, 2024

== Notable alumni ==
Notable alumni include:

- Mel Anthony (b.1943), former football player, University of Michigan
- Adrian Breen (b.1965), former football player, Cincinnati Bengals (NFL)
- Moe Burtschy (1922 – 2004), baseball player, Philadelphia Athletics (MLB)
- Thomas J. Fogarty M.D. (1934 – 2025), surgical instrumentation inventor; Thomas Fogarty Winery proprietor
- Marc Edward Heuck (b.1969), actor known for his role on Beat the Geeks TV game show on Comedy Central
- Pat Kelsey (b.1975), head coach of University of Louisville's men's basketball team
- Corey Kiner (b.2002), football running back, Arizona Cardinals (NFL)
- Tom Kramer (b.1968), former baseball player, Cleveland Indians (MLB)
- Robert Ruwe (1941 – 2022), senior judge of the United States Tax Court
- B.J. Sander (b.1980), former football player, Green Bay Packers (NFL)
- Milt Stegall (b.1970), former football player, Cincinnati Bengals (NFL) and Winnipeg Blue Bombers (CFL)
- James Thompson Jr. (b.2002), football defensive tackle, San Francisco 49ers (NFL)
- Adolphus Washington (b.1994), former football player, Buffalo Bills, Dallas Cowboys, Cincinnati Bengals and Miami Dolphins (NFL)
- John C. Willke (1925 – 2015), physician and anti-abortion activist.
