= 2025 Music City Bowl =

Postseason college football bowl game

2025 Liberty Mutual Music City Bowl
- 27th Music City Bowl
Tennessee Volunteers	Illinois Fighting Illini
(8–4)	(8–4)
SEC	Big Ten
28	30
Head coach: Josh Heupel	Head coach: Bret Bielema
	1	2	3	4	Total
Tennessee	7	0	7	14	28
Illinois	7	3	14	6	30
- Date: Tuesday, December 30, 2025
- Season: 2025
- Stadium: Nissan Stadium
- Location: Nashville, Tennessee
- MVP: Luke Altmyer (QB, Illinois)
- Favorite: Tennessee by 2.5
- Referee: Riley Johnson (ACC)
- Attendance: 52,815

United States TV coverage
- Network: ESPN; ESPN Radio
- Announcers: Tom Hart (play-by-play), Jordan Rodgers (analyst), and Cole Cubelic (sideline reporter) (ESPN); Chris Cotter (play-by-play), Rocky Boiman (analyst), and Stephanie Otey (sideline reporter) (ESPN Radio)

The 2025 Music City Bowl was a college football bowl game played on December 30, 2025, at Nissan Stadium in Nashville, Tennessee. The 27th annual Music City Bowl game began at approximately 4:30 p.m. CST and aired on ESPN. It was one of the 2025–26 bowl games concluding the 2025 FBS football season. The game was sponsored by the Liberty Mutual insurance company and was officially known as the Liberty Mutual Music City Bowl.

The Illinois Fighting Illini from the Big Ten Conference defeated the Tennessee Volunteers from the Southeastern Conference (SEC) by a score of 30–28.

== Teams ==
Consistent with conference tie-ins, the bowl featured Illinois from the Big Ten Conference and Tennessee from the Southeastern Conference (SEC). This was the first meeting of the Illinois and Tennessee football teams.

=== Illinois Fighting Illini ===
Illinois opened their season with five wins in their first six games, losing only to 19th-ranked Indiana, and were ranked as high as ninth. The Fighting Illini then lost back-to-back games; their record stood at 5–3 at the end of October. During November, Illinois won three of their four games, and entered the Music City Bowl with an 8–4 record.

=== Tennessee Volunteers ===
Tennessee compiled a regular-season record of 8–4, and were ranked each week. Each of their losses came to other ranked teams: Georgia, Alabama, Oklahoma, and Vanderbilt. Following a loss in their final regular-season game, Tennessee entered the Music City Bowl unranked.

== Game summary ==
2025 Liberty Mutual Music City Bowl

Quarter	1	2	3	4	Total
Tennessee	7	0	7	14	28
Illinois	7	3	14	6	30

at Nissan Stadium • Nashville, Tennessee

- Date: December 30, 2025
- Game time: 4:30 p.m. CST
- Game weather: Clear • Temperature: 34 °F (1 °C) • Wind: 7 mph (11 km/h) northwest
- Game attendance: 52,815
- Referee: Riley Johnson
- TV announcers (ESPN): Tom Hart (play-by-play), Jordan Rodgers (analyst), and Cole Cubelic (sideline reporter)
- Box score

Game information

First quarter

- (5:16) TENN – Joey Aguilar 7-yard run (Max Gilbert kick) (11 plays, 67 yards, 4:59; TENN 7–0)
- (0:36) ILL – Justin Bowick 18-yard pass from Luke Altmayer (David Olano kick) (9 plays, 75 yards, 5:40; 7–7)

Second quarter

- (0:21) ILL – David Olano 30-yard field goal (12 plays, 67 yards, 3:07; ILL 10–7)

Third quarter

- (0:21) ILL – Leon Lowery Jr. fumble recovery (David Olano kick) (ILL 17–7)
- (7:31) TENN – DeSean Bishop 1-yard run (Max Gilbert kick) (9 plays, 75 yards, 4:17; ILL 17–14)
- (2:41) TENN – Luke Altmayer 2-yard run (David Olano kick) (8 plays, 68 yards, 4:44; ILL 24–14)

Fourth quarter

- (11:40) TENN – DeSean Bishop 12-yard run (Max Gilbert kick) (14 plays, 79 yards, 5:52; ILL 24–21)
- (5:14) ILL – David Olano 28-yard field goal (12 plays, 65 yards, 6:26; ILL 27–21)
- (4:58) TENN – Joakim Dodson 94-yard kickoff return (Max Gilbert kick) (1 plays, 94 yards, 0:00; TENN 28–27)
- (0:03) ILL – David Olano 29-yard field goal (13 plays, 65 yards, 4:58; ILL 30–28)

=== Statistics ===
Statistics	TENN	ILL
First downs	18	27
Plays–yards	55–278	73–417
Rushes–yards	37–157	39–221
Passing yards	121	196
Passing: comp–att–int	14–18–0	20–34–0
Time of possession	24:14	35:46

Team	Category	Player	Statistics
Tennessee	Passing	Joey Aguilar	14/18, 121 yards
Tennessee	Rushing	DeSean Bishop	19 carries, 93 yards
Tennessee	Receiving	Mike Matthews	3 receptions, 43 yards
Illinois	Passing	Luke Altmyer	20/33, 196 yards, TD
Illinois	Rushing	Aidan Laughery	13 carries, 77 yards
Illinois	Receiving	Hudson Clement	3 receptions, 48 yards
