= Nurre-Royston House =

Historic house in Ohio, United States

- U.S. National Register of Historic Places
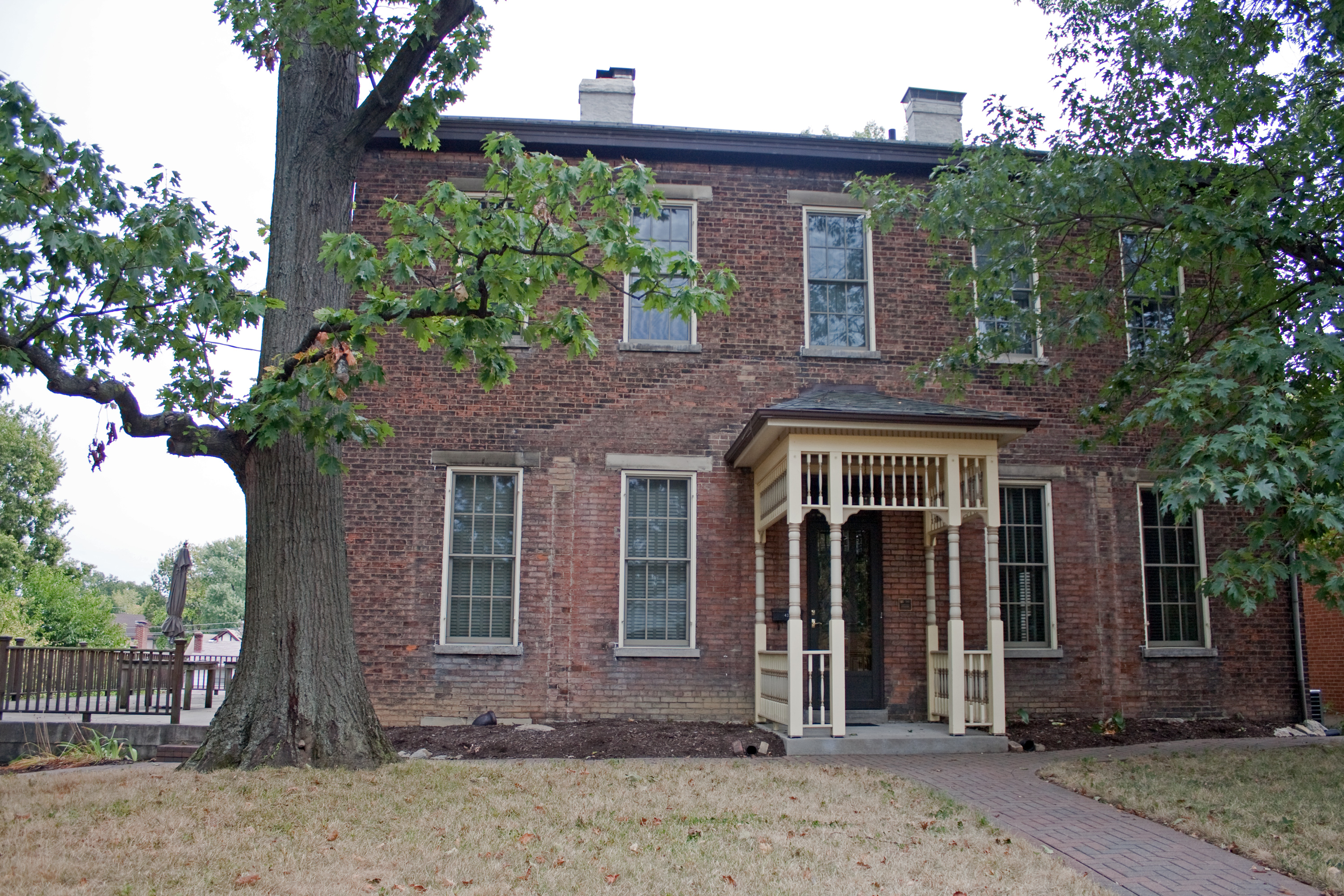

- Location within Ohio
- Location: 4330 Errun Lane, St. Bernard, Ohio
- Coordinates: 39°9′48.924″N 84°29′39.876″W
- Area: less than one acre
- Architectural style: Double-Pile Center Hall
- NRHP reference No.: 08001295
- Added to NRHP: January 8, 2009

Nurre-Royston House is a historic house in St. Bernard, Ohio. It was listed in the National Register of Historic Places on January 8, 2009.
