= Elmwood Place, Ohio =

Village in Hamilton County, Ohio, United States

- Village
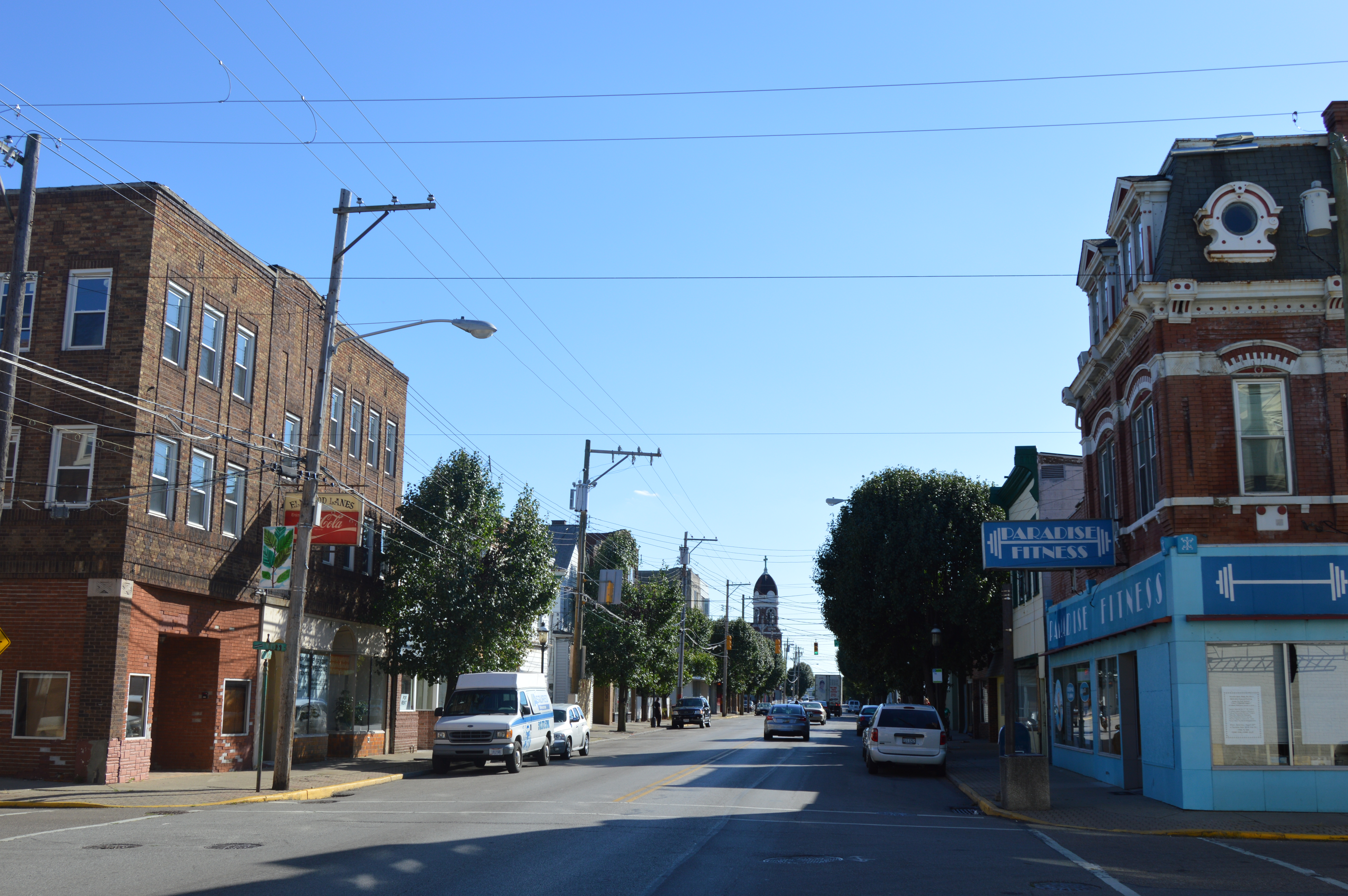
- Vine Street downtown

- Location in Hamilton County and the state of Ohio

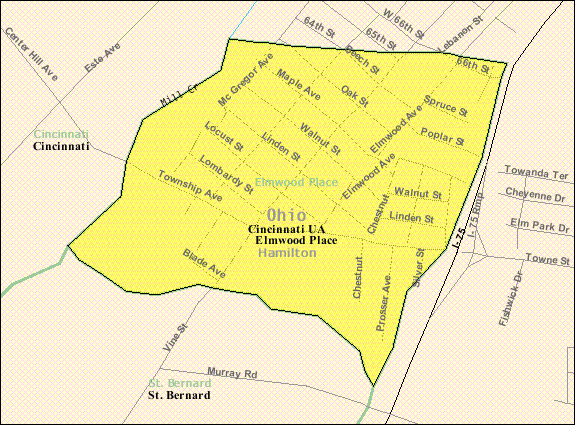
- Detailed map of Elmwood Place
- Coordinates: 39°11′08″N 84°29′21″W
- Country: United States
- State: Ohio
- County: Hamilton

Government
  - Mayor: Ronald L. Spears, Jr.

Area
  - Total: 0.32 sq mi (0.84 km^{2})
  - Land: 0.32 sq mi (0.84 km^{2})
  - Water: 0 sq mi (0.00 km^{2})
- Elevation: 528 ft (161 m)

Population (2020)
  - Total: 2,087
  - Estimate (2023): 2,055
  - Density: 6,453.3/sq mi (2,491.62/km^{2})
- Time zone: UTC-5 (Eastern (EST))
  - Summer (DST): UTC-4 (EDT)
- ZIP Code: 45216
- Area code: 513
- FIPS code: 39-25186
- GNIS feature ID: 1086207
- Website: https://www.elmwoodplace-oh.gov/

Elmwood Place is a village in Hamilton County, Ohio, United States. The population was 2,087 at the 2020 census. Except for a small portion which touches neighboring St. Bernard, Elmwood Place is nearly surrounded by the city of Cincinnati.

== History ==
Elmwood Place was laid out in 1875. The community originally built up chiefly by German Catholics. The village incorporated in 1890.

== Geography ==
According to the United States Census Bureau, the village has a total area of 0.32 square miles (0.83 km^{2}), all land.

== Demographics ==
Historical population
Census	Pop.	Note	%±
1900	2,532		—
1910	3,423		35.2%
1920	3,991		16.6%
1930	4,562		14.3%
1940	4,248		−6.9%
1950	4,113		−3.2%
1960	3,813		−7.3%
1970	3,525		−7.6%
1980	2,840		−19.4%
1990	2,937		3.4%
2000	2,681		−8.7%
2010	2,188		−18.4%
2020	2,087		−4.6%
2023 (est.)	2,055	▼	−1.5%
U.S. Decennial Census

=== 2020 census ===
As of the census of 2020, there were 2,087 people living in the village, for a population density of 6,461.30 people per square mile (2,491.62/km^{2}). There were 1,048 housing units. The racial makeup of the village was 57.8% White, 27.0% Black or African American, 0.5% Native American, 0.4% Asian, 0.1% Pacific Islander, 6.4% from some other race, and 7.8% from two or more races. 8.4% of the population were Hispanic or Latino of any race.

There were 747 households, out of which 36.9% had children under the age of 18 living with them, 21.8% were married couples living together, 43.9% had a male householder with no spouse present, and 30.3% had a female householder with no spouse present. 36.4% of all households were made up of individuals, and 13.6% were someone living alone who was 65 years of age or older. The average household size was 2.97, and the average family size was 4.18.

30.2% of the village's population were under the age of 18, 55.9% were 18 to 64, and 13.9% were 65 years of age or older. The median age was 33.6. For every 100 females, there were 106.4 males.

According to the U.S. Census American Community Survey, for the period 2016-2020 the estimated median annual income for a household in the village was $37,552, and the median income for a family was $51,136. About 24.1% of the population were living below the poverty line, including 28.4% of those under age 18 and 25.7% of those age 65 or over. About 52.4% of the population were employed, and 7.8% had a bachelor's degree or higher.

=== 2010 census ===
As of the census of 2010, there were 2,188 people, 872 households, and 477 families living in the village. The population density was 6,837.5 inhabitants per square mile (2,640.0/km^{2}). There were 1,099 housing units at an average density of 3,434.4 per square mile (1,326.0/km^{2}). The racial makeup of the village was 79.1% White, 14.9% African American, 0.3% Native American, 0.7% Asian, 0.5% Pacific Islander, 1.0% from other races, and 3.6% from two or more races. Hispanic or Latino of any race were 3.6% of the population.

There were 872 households, of which 32.7% had children under the age of 18 living with them, 27.5% were married couples living together, 21.1% had a female householder with no husband present, 6.1% had a male householder with no wife present, and 45.3% were non-families. 35.6% of all households were made up of individuals, and 8.6% had someone living alone who was 65 years of age or older. The average household size was 2.51 and the average family size was 3.30.

The median age in the village was 35.2 years. 26.6% of residents were under the age of 18; 10.4% were between the ages of 18 and 24; 25.8% were from 25 to 44; 27.4% were from 45 to 64; and 9.6% were 65 years of age or older. The gender makeup of the village was 50.7% male and 49.3% female.

=== 2000 census ===
As of the census of 2000, there were 2,681 people, 1,061 households, and 658 families living in the village. The population density was 8,106.5 inhabitants per square mile (3,129.9/km^{2}). There were 1,173 housing units at an average density of 3,546.8 per square mile (1,369.4/km^{2}). The racial makeup of the village was 91.87% White, 5.45% African American, 0.56% Native American, 0.19% Asian, 0.07% Pacific Islander, 0.67% from other races, and 1.19% from two or more races. Hispanic or Latino of any race were 1.64% of the population.

There were 1,061 households, out of which 33.1% had children under the age of 18 living with them, 36.7% were married couples living together, 18.8% had a female householder with no husband present, and 37.9% were non-families. 32.0% of all households were made up of individuals, and 7.5% had someone living alone who was 65 years of age or older. The average household size was 2.53 and the average family size was 3.23.

In the village, the population was spread out, with 29.2% under the age of 18, 9.8% from 18 to 24, 29.8% from 25 to 44, 21.0% from 45 to 64, and 10.1% who were 65 years of age or older. The median age was 33 years. For every 100 females there were 104.7 males. For every 100 females age 18 and over, there were 102.8 males.

The median income for a household in the village was $29,017, and the median income for a family was $31,528. Males had a median income of $29,902 versus $21,812 for females. The per capita income for the village was $13,466. About 20.2% of families and 19.0% of the population were below the poverty line, including 26.9% of those under age 18 and 7.3% of those age 65 or over.
