= Rochester High School (Illinois) =

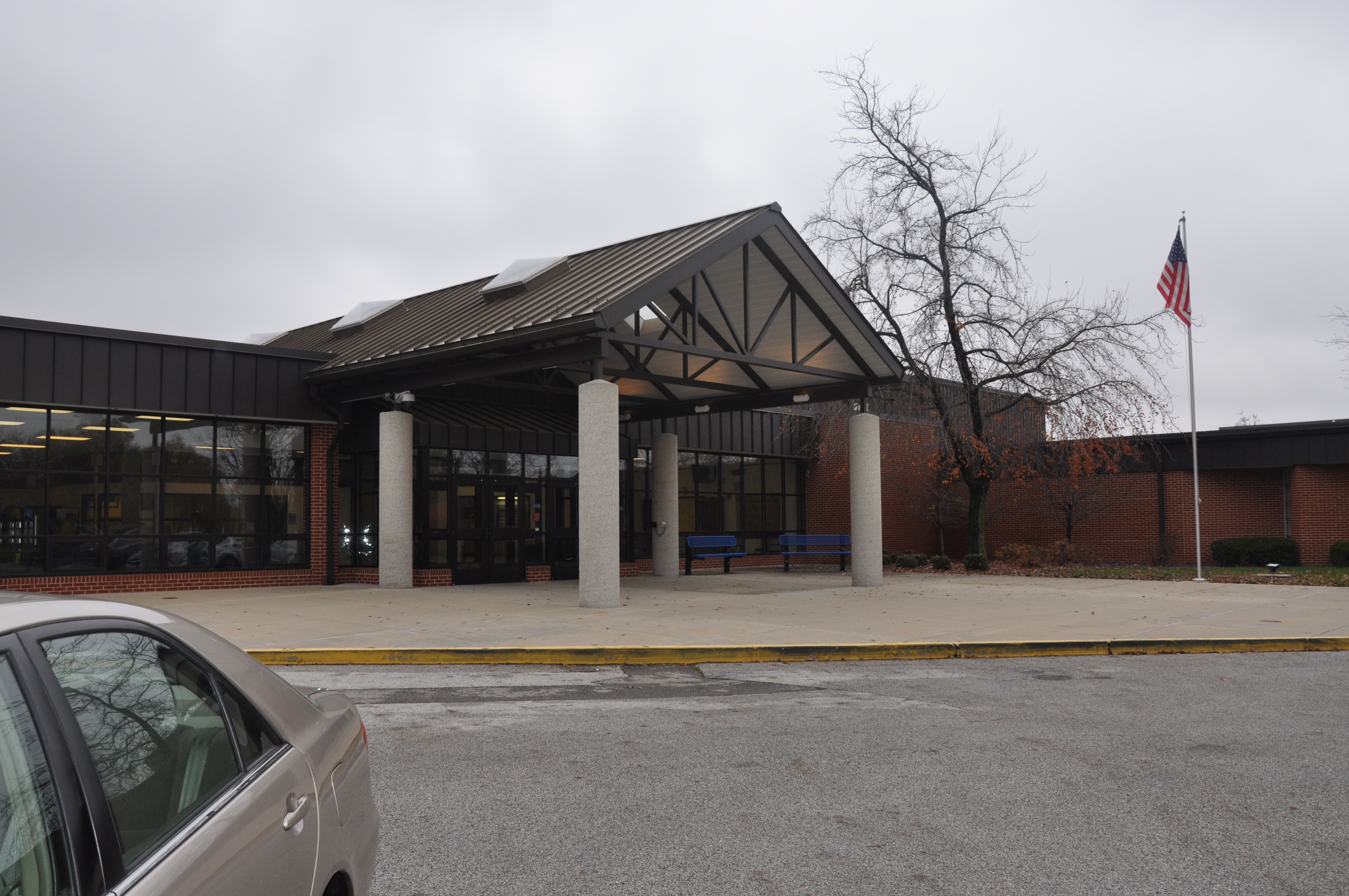

Location
- 3 Rocket Drive; Rochester, Illinois 62563; United States
- 39.753°N 89.539°W

Information
- School type: Public Secondary
- Motto: It’s a Great Day to be a Rocket
- School district: Rochester CUSD 3A
- Superintendent: Dan Cox
- Principal: Jeff Reed
- Teaching staff: 41.00 (FTE)
- Grades: 9–12
- Gender: coed
- Enrollment: 692 (2024–2025)
- Student to teacher ratio: 16.88
- Campus type: Suburban
- Colors: Navy blue Orange
- Slogan: Go Rockets
- Fight song: Go You Rochester
- Athletics conference: Central State Eight
- Team name: Rockets
- Website: www.rochester3a.net/o/rhs

Rochester High School of Rochester, Illinois is a public high school located five miles (8 km) east of Springfield. As the only high school serving District 3A, Rochester High School accommodates students from Rochester, Buckhart, portions of eastern Springfield, and other surrounding areas. Rochester has grown rapidly over the past few years. In 2008, the enrollment was 699 students, which was up from 589 in 2004.

== Building and campus ==
The campus of Rochester High School is located on the north side of Illinois Route 29 in Rochester. The high school shares the campus and a building with Rochester Junior High School. The campus contains not only the school building and parking, but also a track and field/football stadium, a baseball fields, a softball field, six tennis courts, and an indoor athletic complex. The high school soccer fields are on the campus of Rochester Elementary 2–3 School.

=== Recent construction ===
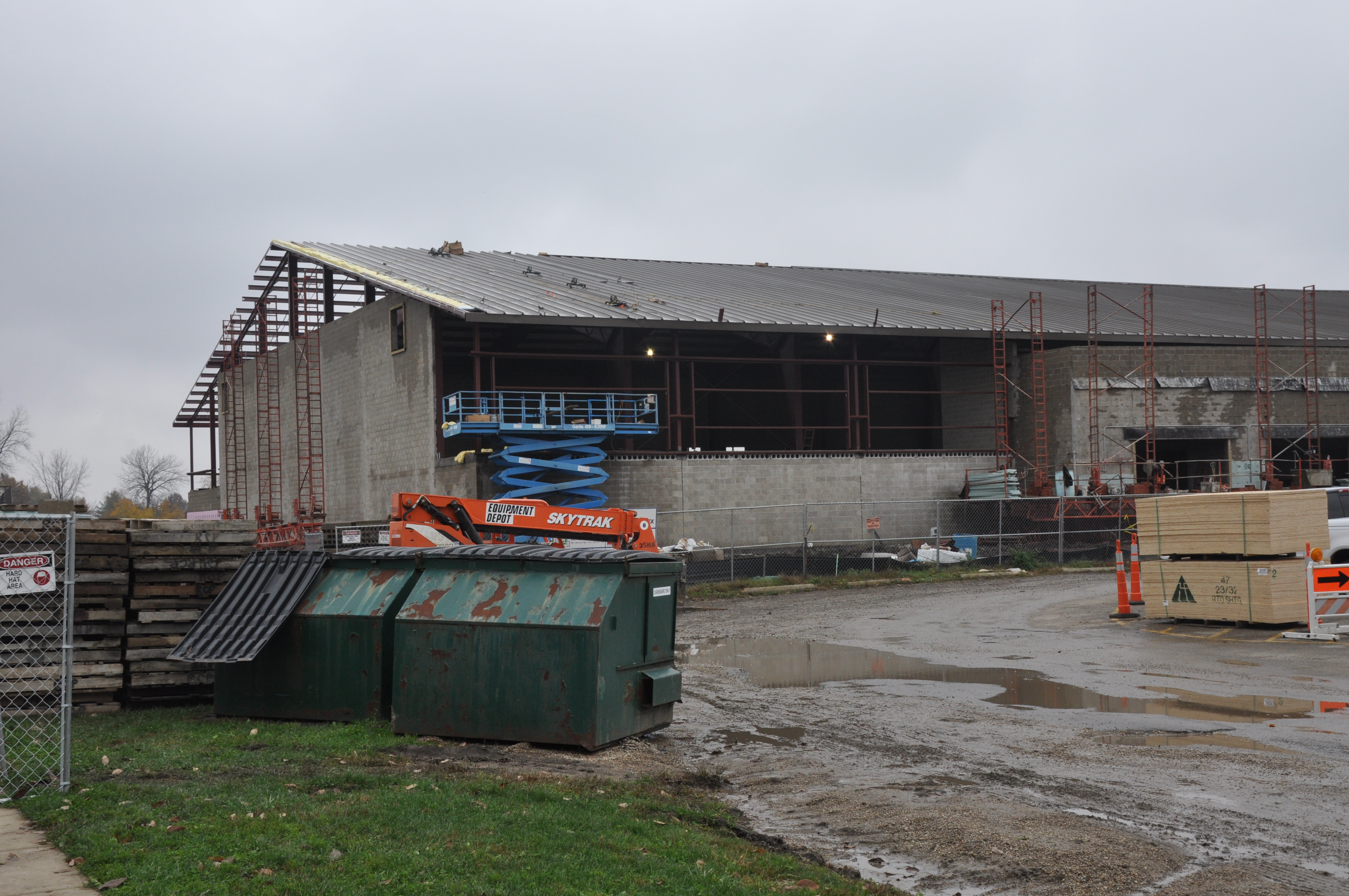
Construction of the new fieldhouse as of October 2009

Rochester has added a field house and athletic complex on their campus. The new field house is approximately 45,000 square feet (4,200 m^{2}) and be able to seat 2,500 people. The complex contains a main competition gym floor, retractable bleachers, two side courts, a three-lane track, a wrestling area, weight and locker rooms, and a team meeting room. Also, the complex has a geothermal heating and cooling system for maximum energy efficiency. Construction began in March 2009, and is now complete. District residents approved a $26 million bond referendum in 2007 to pay for this complex, and also a new intermediate school in the district.

== History ==
Rochester schools have existed since 1823. There have been many changes throughout the years to get to what the school is today. The following is a historical time line of the Rochester school system:

- 1823-The First log school house in the territory that would later become Rochester was built.
- 1826-The log house burned down.
- 1831-A new 18x30 feet log school house was built.
- 1837-An improved building replaced the 1831 log house.
- 18??-A new stone school was built 2 miles (3.2 km) west of Rochester near the present South Fork Bridge.
- 1865-The stone building was replaced with a new two story school house at a cost of $3,600. This new building measured 26x40 feet.
- 1880-The 1865 building burned down.
- 1881-A new brick building was constructed on Main Street where the Masonic Temple is today. The new building was 32x50 feet and cost $5,000 to construct. Due to increased enrollment, the 5th and 6th grade classes were held in the town hall next door.
- 1920-A new brick building was constructed on North Walnut. At the time, the building held 11 grades, and any student wishing to attend a 4th year of high school had to go to Springfield. This building was recently demolished and at the time of demolition was used as the junior high.
- 1937-The Rochester Community HS District #182 was formed and a new two-story building was constructed on the same campus as the 1920 building. The new building faced Route 29, and cost $76,153 to construct. It contained 8 rooms and was the first building used only for the high school. This building was recently demolished and at the time of demolition it was used as administrative offices.
- 1939-An Ag Shop and storage room were added to the high school building.
- 1951-A three-story south wing containing 10 classrooms and a cafeteria was added to the grade school on North Walnut. The new addition cost $125,000.
- 1959-A new high school building was opened on the same campus as the 1920 and 1937 buildings. This building is what is now known as the J-wing on the current high school building.
- 1967-An Ag Shop and Industrial Arts facility, 15 more classrooms, a gym, and a cafeteria were added to the Route 29 campus.
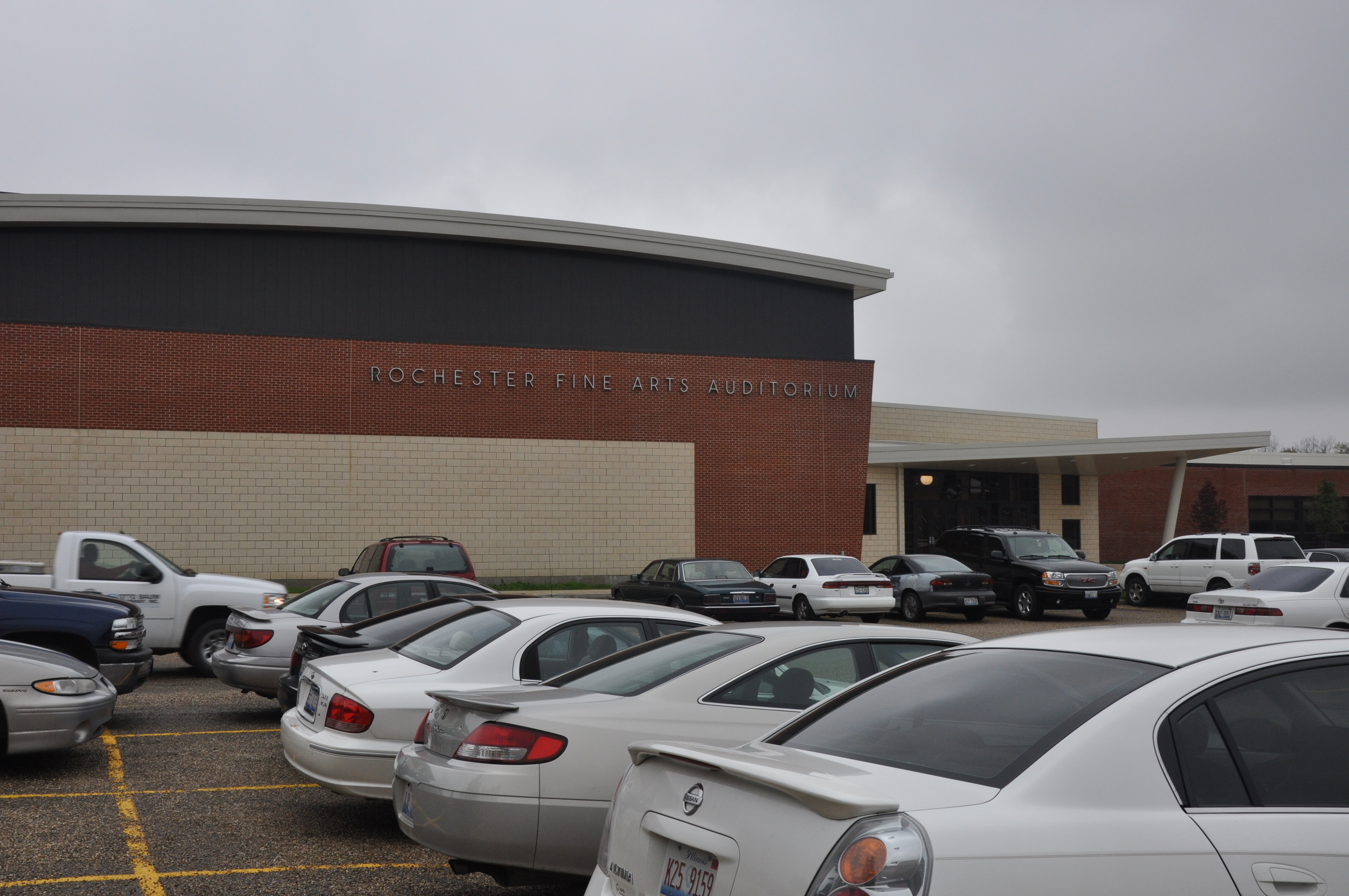
  Fine Arts Auditorium constructed in 2008
- 1976-The main wing and library of the existing high school were added to the high school. The high school moved into the new addition and the junior high moved into the old high school(J-wing). Also, an addition was added to the North Walnut building.
- 1991-A new elementary school was opened on a new campus on West Main.
- 1998-A transportation facility was built on the West Main campus.
- 1999-Science labs were added to the existing high school.
- 2000-A new middle school was completed on the West Main campus.
- 2005-An eight-room addition to the Elementary school was completed.
- 2008-The high school and junior high combined into the high school building. Fourteen new classrooms, a fine arts auditorium, and a cafeteria were added to the existing high school. Also, a bond referendum was passed to build a new middle school and fieldhouse.
- 2010-The Rochester Athletic Complex was opened on the Route 29 campus.
- 2011-The Rochester Intermediate School opened for students in January.

== Academic status ==
Rochester High School ranked as the 43rd best high school out of 650 ranked in Illinois based on 11th grade Prairie State Achievement Examination (PSAE) reading and math scores in 2008. All students in Illinois are required to take the ACT examination during their junior year of high school. The SAT examination is optional, and few students elect to take this test. 2008 academic averages are:

ACT

- Composite: 22.0
- English: 22.1
- Math: 21.5
- Reading: 22.3
- Science: 21.4

PSAE Meets/Exceeds in 2010

- Reading:68%
- Math: 71%
- Science: 68%
- Writing: 70%

Rochester High School had 100% graduation rates in 2005 and 2007.

== Student life ==
Grade Point Averages (GPA) at Rochester High School are based on a 4.0 scale. However, students have the option to take weighted classes, so it is possible for them to have a GPA higher than a 4.0. Also, students have the option to take dual credit classes through Lincoln Land Community College(LLCC) and earn college credit for select classes they are taking at Rochester. Classes available to take for dual credit are Calculus, English, Spanish, Statistics, Cisco, Human Anatomy & Physiology, Physics, Chemistry II, and American Studies.

=== Athletics ===
All of Rochester High School's sports teams currently compete in the CS8. Rochester High School is also a member of the Illinois High School Association(IHSA), which governs most interscholastic athletics and competitions in Illinois.

Rochester athletic teams are known as the Rockets, and their colors are Navy and Orange. The team colors used to be purple and gold, but in the fall of 1937 the colors were changed to the modern day navy and orange. Rochester has athletic teams for both men and women in basketball, track and field, golf, soccer, tennis, and cross country. There are also men's teams for baseball, football, and wrestling, while there are women's teams for volleyball, softball, cheerleading, and a pom pom dance team.

The following teams have placed in the top five of their respective IHSA sponsored state championship tournaments or meets:

- Boys Golf: State Champion (1999–2000)
- Boys Football: State Champions (2010–2011) (2011–2012) (2012–2013) (2013–2014) (2014–2015) (2016–2017) (2017–2018) (2019–2020) (2023–2024)
- Girls Soccer: 1A State Champions (2008–2009); 1A State Champions (2015–2016); 2A State Champions (2016–2017)
- Girls Track and Field: State Champions (1993–1994)

== Demographics ==
Racial/Ethnic Background (2010):

- White: 97.2%
- Black: 1.2%
- Hispanic: 0.9%
- Asian: 0.6%
- Native American: 0.0%
- Multi-Racial/Ethnic: 0.1%

Other Data (2010):

- Low-Income Rate: 4.2%
- Limited English-Proficient Rate: 0.0%
- Dropout Rate: 0.3%
- Chronic Truancy Rate: 0.5%
- Mobility Rate: 4.2%
- Attendance Rate: 95.1%

== Notable alumni ==
- Hank Beatty, college football wide receiver for the Illinois Fighting Illini
