= Adrian Breen (American football) =

American football player (born 1965)

No. 18
- Position: Quarterback

Personal information
- Born: January 11, 1965 (age 61); New York, New York, U.S.
- Listed height: 6 ft 4 in (1.93 m)
- Listed weight: 183 lb (83 kg)

Career information
- High school: Roger Bacon (St. Bernard, Ohio)
- College: Morehead State
- NFL draft: 1987: undrafted

Career history
- St. Louis Cardinals (1987)*; Cincinnati Bengals (1987)
- * Offseason or practice squad member only

Career NFL statistics
- Passing attempts: 8
- Passing completions: 3
- Completion percentage: 37.5%
- TD–INT: 1–0
- Passing yards: 9
- Passer rating: 85.4
- Stats at Pro Football Reference

Adrian Owen Breen (born January 11, 1965) is an American former professional football player who was a quarterback for the Cincinnati Bengals of the National Football League (NFL). He played college football for the Morehead State Eagles.

Adrian is currently the president and CEO of the Bank of Missouri.
