= Hank Beatty =

American football player (born 2003)

Profile
- Position: Wide receiver

Personal information
- Born: September 20, 2003 (age 23); Oconomowoc, Wisconsin, U.S.
- Listed height: 5 ft 10 in (1.78 m)
- Listed weight: 179 lb (81 kg)

Career information
- High school: Rochester (Rochester, Illinois)
- College: Illinois (2022–2025)
- NFL draft: 2026: undrafted

Career history
- Tennessee Titans (2026)*
- * Offseason or practice squad member only

Awards and highlights
- 2× Third-team All-Big Ten (2024, 2025)
- Stats at Pro Football Reference

Hank Beatty (born September 20, 2003) is an American professional football wide receiver. He played college football for the Illinois Fighting Illini.

== Early life ==
Beatty was born on September 20, 2003 in Oconomowoc, Wisconsin. Beatty attended high school at Rochester High School in Rochester, Illinois. In the first game of his senior season, after a stellar performance he became the first player in CS8 history with more than 1,000 yards passing, rushing and receiving. He finished his senior year, completing 152 of 236 passing attempts for 1,899 yards and 23 touchdowns, while adding 1,371 rushing yards and 24 touchdowns on 146 carries and catching 22 passes for 341 yards and two touchdowns, where for his performance he was named the Illinois Gatorade Player of the Year. Coming out of high school, Beatty was rated as a three-star recruit, and the 23rd overall prospect in the State of Illinois, where he committed to play college football for the Illinois Fighting Illini over offers from other schools such as Iowa State, Air Force, Central Michigan, and Illinois State.

== College career ==
During his first two collegiate seasons in 2022 and 2023, Beatty totaled 90 receiving yards and eight return yards. In the 2024 Citrus Bowl, he tallied a career-high 90 yards versus South Carolina. Beatty finished the 2024 season hauling in 20 passes for 294 yards and a touchdown, while also returning 22 punts for 310 yards. For his performance during the 2024 season, he was named third team all-Big Ten. Heading into the 2025 season, he was named to the Paul Hornung Award watch list. In week one of the 2025 season, Beatty hauled in five passes for 108 yards, while also returning four punts for an Illinois single-game record 133 yards and a touchdown, in a victory over Western Illinois.

== Professional career ==
Pre-draft measurables
Height	Weight	Arm length	Hand span	Wingspan	40-yard dash	10-yard split	20-yard split	20-yard shuttle	Three-cone drill	Vertical jump	Broad jump	Bench press
5 ft 10 1/4 in (1.78 m)	179 lb (81 kg)	29 in (0.74 m)	9 1/4 in (0.23 m)	5 ft 11 in (1.80 m)	4.60 s	1.63 s	2.60 s	4.27 s	7.07 s	34.0 in (0.86 m)	10 ft 0 in (3.05 m)	10 reps
All values from Pro Day

On April 30, 2026, after going undrafted in the 2026 NFL draft, Beatty signed with the Tennessee Titans as an undrafted free agent. Beatty was waived by Tennessee as a part of final roster cuts on August 30; he was re–signed to the team's practice squad the next day. On September 2, the Titans waived Beatty from the practice squad.
