= Aidan Laughery =

American football player (born 2003)

No. 21 – Illinois Fighting Illini
- Position: Running back
- Class: (redshirt) Junior

Personal information
- Born: October 1, 2003 (age 23)
- Listed height: 5 ft 11 in (1.80 m)
- Listed weight: 200 lb (91 kg)

Career information
- High school: GCMS (Gibson City, Illinois)
- College: Illinois (2022–present)
- Stats at ESPN

Aidan Laughery (born October 1, 2003) is an American college football running back for the Illinois Fighting Illini.

== Early life ==
Laughery attended Gibson City-Melvin-Sibley High School in Gibson City, Illinois. He missed significant playing time during his senior year after suffering an injury. Laughery committed to play college football at the University of Illinois Urbana-Champaign over an offer from Iowa.

== College career ==
Laughery played sparingly during his first two seasons, redshirting in 2022. In 2023, he scored his first collegiate touchdown against Florida Atlantic. His production increased in 2024, as he served as the Fighting Illini's starting running back in the season opener. Against Northwestern, Laugherty rushed for 172 yards and three touchdowns, being named the Big Ten Co-Offensive Player of the Week. He finished the 2024 season recording 589 yards rushing and four touchdowns. Entering the 2025 season, Laughery was named to the Doak Walker Award watch list.

=== Statistics ===
College statistics
Season	Team	Games	Rushing				Receiving			
Season	Team	GP	Att	Yards	Avg	TD	Rec	Yards	Avg	TD
2022	Illinois	1	3	9	3.0	0	0	0	0.0	0
2023	Illinois	9	16	81	5.1	1	2	24	12.0	0
2024	Illinois	13	97	589	6.1	4	9	32	3.6	0
2025	Illinois	9	75	382	5.1	3	9	54	6.0	0
2026	Illinois	9	100	615	6.2	2	12	82	6.8	1
Career		40	291	1,676	5.8	10	32	192	6.0	1
