= St. Bernard, Ohio =

- Village
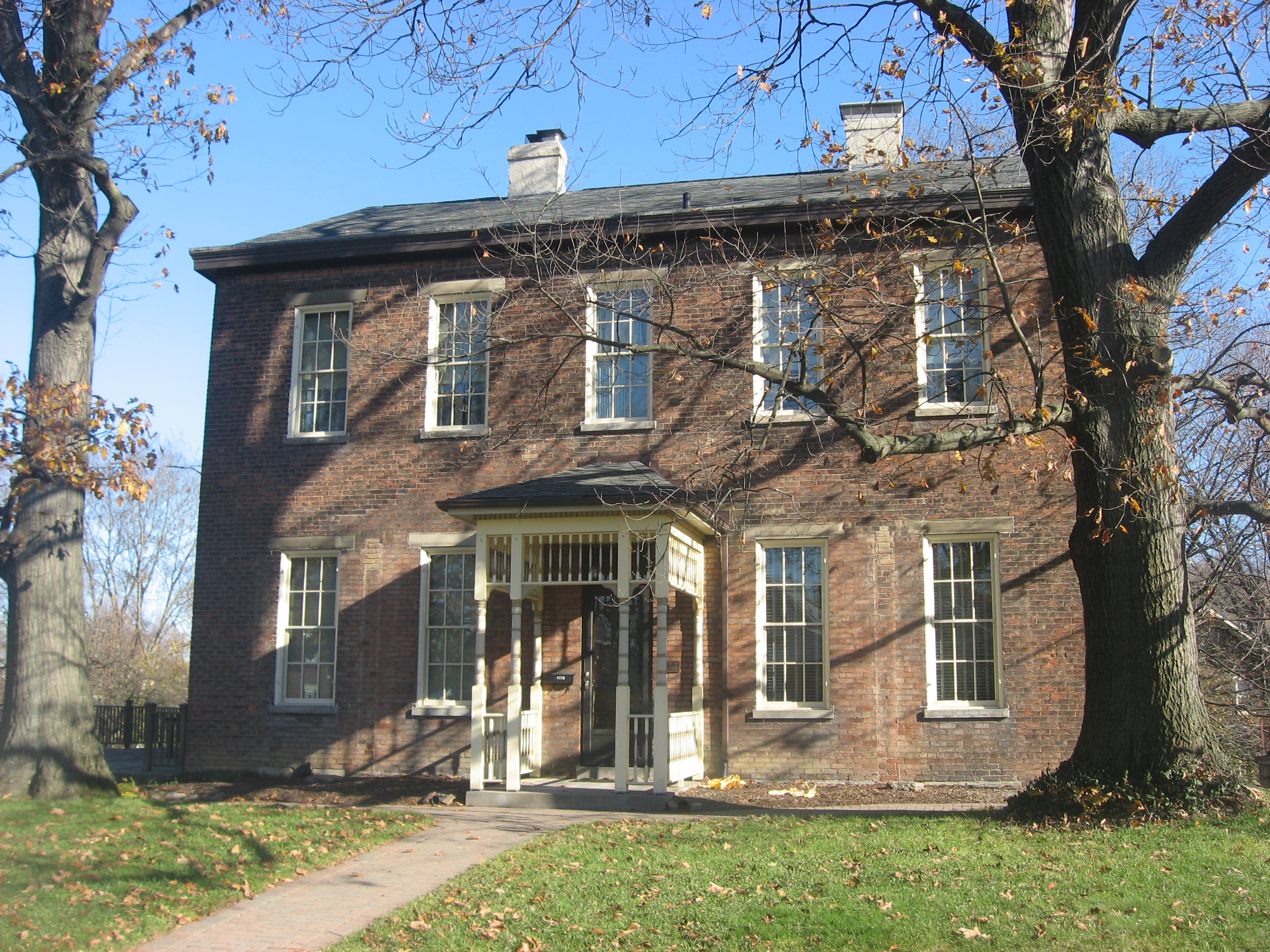
- Nurre-Royston House, built 1859

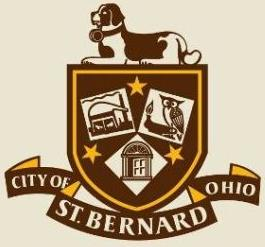
- Flag Seal

- Location in Hamilton County and the state of Ohio

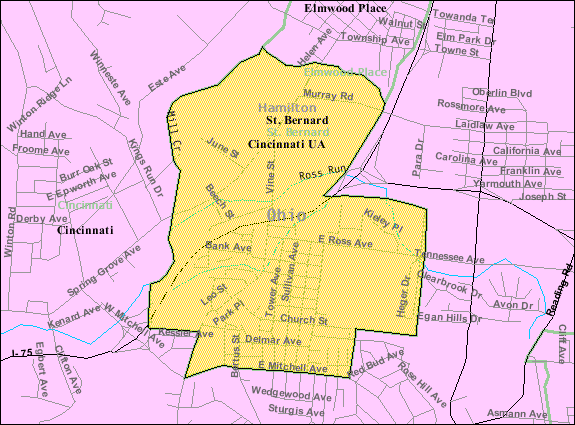
- Detailed map of St. Bernard
- Coordinates: 39°10′16″N 84°30′02″W
- Country: United States
- State: Ohio
- County: Hamilton

Area
  - Total: 1.54 sq mi (4.00 km^{2})
  - Land: 1.53 sq mi (3.97 km^{2})
  - Water: 0.0077 sq mi (0.02 km^{2})
- Elevation: 541 ft (165 m)

Population (2020)
  - Total: 4,070
  - Density: 2,652.1/sq mi (1,023.97/km^{2})
- Time zone: UTC-5 (Eastern (EST))
  - Summer (DST): UTC-4 (EDT)
- FIPS code: 39-69470
- GNIS feature ID: 1086226
- Website: www.cityofstbernard.org

St. Bernard or Saint Bernard is a village in Hamilton County, Ohio, United States. It is an enclave and suburb of Cincinnati. The population was 4,070 at the 2020 census.

== History ==
St. Bernard was laid out in 1851 at the intersection of Main Street (now Vine Street, Cincinnati), the Miami and Erie Canal, and the Cincinnati, Hamilton and Dayton Railway. The town was originally built up chiefly by Germans.

St. Bernard was incorporated as a village in 1878.

== Geography ==
St. Bernard along with Norwood and Elmwood Place, is an enclave surrounded by the city of Cincinnati.

According to the United States Census Bureau, the village has a total area of 1.56 square miles (4.04 km^{2}), of which 1.55 square miles (4.01 km^{2}) is land and 0.01 square miles (0.03 km^{2}) is water.

== Demographics ==
Historical population
Census	Pop.	Note	%±
1880	1,022		—
1890	1,770		73.2%
1900	3,384		91.2%
1910	5,002		47.8%
1920	6,312		26.2%
1930	7,487		18.6%
1940	7,387		−1.3%
1950	7,066		−4.3%
1960	6,778		−4.1%
1970	6,131		−9.5%
1980	5,396		−12.0%
1990	5,344		−1.0%
2000	4,924		−7.9%
2010	4,368		−11.3%
2020	4,070		−6.8%

=== 2020 census ===
As of the 2020 census, there were 4,070 people living in the village. The population density was 2,651.47 inhabitants per square mile (1,023.97/km^{2}). 100.0% of residents lived in urban areas, while 0.0% lived in rural areas.

There were 1,884 households in St. Bernard, of which 24.7% had children under the age of 18 living in them. Of all households, 33.4% were married-couple households, 23.9% were households with a male householder and no spouse or partner present, and 35.4% were households with a female householder and no spouse or partner present. About 39.3% of all households were made up of individuals and 16.2% had someone living alone who was 65 years of age or older. There were 2,093 housing units, of which 10.0% were vacant. The homeowner vacancy rate was 1.7% and the rental vacancy rate was 10.6%.

The median age was 39.0 years. 19.9% of residents were under the age of 18 and 16.3% were 65 years of age or older. For every 100 females there were 95.5 males, and for every 100 females age 18 and over there were 93.0 males age 18 and over.

Racial composition as of the 2020 census
Race	Number	Percent
White	2,872	70.6%
Black or African American	824	20.2%
American Indian and Alaska Native	14	0.3%
Asian	38	0.9%
Native Hawaiian and Other Pacific Islander	4	0.1%
Some other race	48	1.2%
Two or more races	270	6.6%
Hispanic or Latino (of any race)	88	2.2%

=== Income and poverty ===
According to the U.S. Census American Community Survey, for the period 2016-2020 the estimated median annual income for a household in the village was $68,373, and the median income for a family was $95,761. About 5.8% of the population were living below the poverty line, including 0.0% of those under age 18 and 8.4% of those age 65 or over. About 70.2% of the population were employed, and 25.9% had a bachelor's degree or higher.

=== 2010 census ===
As of the census of 2010, there were 4,368 people, 1,869 households, and 1,090 families living in the village. The population density was 2,818.1 inhabitants per square mile (1,088.1/km^{2}). There were 2,128 housing units at an average density of 1,372.9 per square mile (530.1/km^{2}). The racial makeup of the village was 80.0% White, 15.7% African American, 0.3% Native American, 0.7% Asian, 0.1% Pacific Islander, 0.9% from other races, and 2.3% from two or more races. Hispanic or Latino of any race were 1.9% of the population.

There were 1,869 households, of which 29.9% had children under the age of 18 living with them, 37.2% were married couples living together, 15.4% had a female householder with no husband present, 5.7% had a male householder with no wife present, and 41.7% were non-families. 36.2% of all households were made up of individuals, and 12.8% had someone living alone who was 65 years of age or older. The average household size was 2.33 and the average family size was 3.08.

The median age in the village was 38.2 years. 23.6% of residents were under the age of 18; 10% were between the ages of 18 and 24; 25.1% were from 25 to 44; 28.2% were from 45 to 64; and 13% were 65 years of age or older. The gender makeup of the village was 47.2% male and 52.8% female.

=== 2000 census ===
As of the census of 2000, there were 4,924 people, 2,069 households, and 1,251 families living in the village. The population density was 3,196.1 inhabitants per square mile (1,234.0/km^{2}). There were 2,195 housing units at an average density of 1,424.7 per square mile (550.1/km^{2}). The racial makeup of the village was 91.41% White, 6.46% African American, 0.18% Native American, 0.63% Asian, 0.02% Pacific Islander, 0.43% from other races, and 0.87% from two or more races. Hispanic or Latino of any race were 0.65% of the population.

There were 2,069 households, out of which 29.5% had children under the age of 18 living with them, 41.0% were married couples living together, 14.4% had a female householder with no husband present, and 39.5% were non-families. 34.5% of all households were made up of individuals, and 14.5% had someone living alone who was 65 years of age or older. The average household size was 2.38 and the average family size was 3.09.

In the village, the population was spread out, with 25.4% under the age of 18, 9.5% from 18 to 24, 29.3% from 25 to 44, 20.3% from 45 to 64, and 15.5% who were 65 years of age or older. The median age was 36 years. For every 100 females there were 90.9 males. For every 100 females age 18 and over, there were 84.2 males.

The median income for a household in the village was $37,356, and the median income for a family was $45,366. Males had a median income of $35,095 versus $26,672 for females. The per capita income for the village was $18,036. About 7.3% of families and 8.7% of the population were below the poverty line, including 7.6% of those under age 18 and 11.8% of those age 65 or over.

== Education ==
St. Bernard has a joint public school district with the neighboring Village of Elmwood Place. The district is called St. Bernard-Elmwood Place Village Schools, and is separate from Cincinnati Public Schools. The district has one building for both the elementary and high school. The village is also home to two parochial schools; St. Clement Elementary and Roger Bacon High School.

St. Bernard is served by a branch of the Public Library of Cincinnati and Hamilton County.
