= List of Illinois Fighting Illini in the NFL draft =

This is a list of Illinois Fighting Illini football players in the NFL draft.

== Key ==
B	Back	K	Kicker	NT	Nose tackle
C	Center	LB	Linebacker	FB	Fullback
DB	Defensive back	P	Punter	HB	Halfback
DE	Defensive end	QB	Quarterback	WR	Wide receiver
DT	Defensive tackle	RB	Running back	G	Guard
E	End	T	Offensive tackle	TE	Tight end

== Selections ==
Year	Round	Pick	Player	Team	Position
1937	8	77	Elvin Sayre	Detroit Lions	C
1939	20	187	Jim McDonald	Detroit Lions	C
1940	15	139	Mel Brewer	Green Bay Packers	G
1940	20	189	Jim Reeder	Green Bay Packers	T
1941	21	195	Tom Riggs	Washington Redskins	T
1943	26	244	Eddie McGovern	Chicago Cardinals	B
1944	1	11	Tony Butkovich	Cleveland Rams	B
1944	8	71	Alex Agase	Green Bay Packers	G
1944	14	133	John Genis	Brooklyn Dodgers	T
1944	14	137	Don Griffin	Green Bay Packers	B
1944	26	265	Ray Grierson	Brooklyn Dodgers	E
1945	9	82	Les Joop	Detroit Lions	T
1945	12	115	Mike Kasap	Detroit Lions	T
1945	26	268	Ray Florek	Cleveland Rams	B
1946	2	11	Mac Wenskunas	Chicago Cardinals	C
1946	2	14	Julie Rykovich	Chicago Bears	B
1946	11	99	Chick Maggioli	Washington Redskins	B
1946	12	104	Frank Bauman	Chicago Bears	E
1946	14	129	Stan Sprague	Washington Redskins	E
1946	19	174	Tom Gallagher	Chicago Bears	B
1946	27	255	Butch Kalens	New York Giants	G
1947	9	70	Art Dufelmeier	Chicago Cardinals	B
1947	9	75	Dwight Eddleman	Chicago Bears	B
1947	11	93	Russ Steger	Los Angeles Rams	B
1947	23	213	Lou Levanti	Los Angeles Rams	C
1947	30	285	Jack Pierce	Chicago Bears	B
1947	32	299	Bob Prymuski	Los Angeles Rams	G
1948	3	15	Les Bingaman	Detroit Lions	T
1948	8	61	Bob Cunz	Green Bay Packers	T
1948	13	107	Russ Steger	Detroit Lions	B
1948	13	111	Perry Moss	Green Bay Packers	B
1948	15	131	Lou Agase	Green Bay Packers	T
1949	13	123	Al Mastrangeli	Green Bay Packers	C
1949	13	131	Lyle Button	Philadelphia Eagles	T
1949	14	140	Tony Klimek	Chicago Cardinals	E
1949	18	178	Herb Siegert	Washington Redskins	G
1949	23	227	Walt Kersulis	Los Angeles Rams	E
1950	14	175	Lyle Button	Washington Redskins	T
1950	23	294	Walt Kerulis	Pittsburgh Steelers	E
1950	28	356	Johnny Karras	Detroit Lions	B
1950	29	369	Russ Steger	Detroit Lions	B
1951	5	51	Lynn Lynch	Chicago Cardinals	G
1951	8	91	Dick Raklovits	Detroit Lions	B
1951	13	153	Wayne Siegert	Detroit Lions	T
1951	13	158	Paul Douglass	New York Giants	B
1951	18	216	Chuck Brown	Chicago Bears	G
1951	20	234	Al Tate	San Francisco 49ers	T
1951	27	324	Al Brosky	Los Angeles Rams	B
1952	2	16	Johnny Karras	Chicago Cardinals	B
1952	4	41	Chuck Ulrich	Philadelphia Eagles	T
1952	16	187	Marv Berschet	Washington Redskins	T
1952	16	189	Herb Neathery	Cleveland Browns	B
1952	18	212	Tommy O'Connell	Chicago Bears	B
1952	20	231	Chuck Boerio	Green Bay Packers	C
1952	21	247	Dick Jenkins	Washington Redskins	T
1952	26	312	Joe Vernasco	Cleveland Browns	E
1952	30	353	Don Stevens	Philadelphia Eagles	B
1953	5	61	Rex Smith	Philadelphia Eagles	E
1953	16	191	Eric Kuykendall	Cleveland Browns	B
1953	19	225	Pete Bachouros	Philadelphia Eagles	B
1954	1	6	Stan Wallace	Chicago Bears	RB
1954	1	12	John Bauer	Cleveland Browns	G
1954	2	21	Rocky Ryan	Philadelphia Eagles	E
1954	14	162	Ken Miller	Chicago Bears	B
1954	21	252	Jim Baughman	Cleveland Browns	G
1954	29	341	Claude Taliaferro	Baltimore Colts	B
1955	25	300	Dick Miller	Detroit Lions	T
1955	30	356	Bob Gongola	San Francisco 49ers	B
1956	7	82	J. C. Caroline	Chicago Bears	B
1956	12	144	Em Lindbeck	Los Angeles Rams	QB
1956	14	162	Carnell Neuman	Chicago Cardinals	B
1956	29	348	Mickey Bates	Los Angeles Rams	B
1957	2	15	Abe Woodson	San Francisco 49ers	B
1957	5	58	Wayne Bock	Chicago Cardinals	T
1957	20	231	Percy Oliver	Green Bay Packers	G
1957	24	282	Gary Francis	Pittsburgh Steelers	E
1958	3	36	Ray Nitschke	Green Bay Packers	LB
1958	7	84	Bobby Mitchell	Cleveland Browns	RB
1958	10	110	Carl Johnson	Green Bay Packers	T
1958	24	282	Rod Hanson	Washington Redskins	E
1959	1	11	Rich Kreitling	Cleveland Browns	WR
1959	9	107	Jack Delveaux	New York Giants	B
1959	18	207	Darrell DeDecker	Chicago Cardinals	T
1959	23	270	Bruce Dollahan	San Francisco 49ers	T
1959	29	346	Ron Nietupski	Cleveland Browns	T
1960	5	50	Bill Burrell	St. Louis Cardinals	LB
1961	1	3	Joe Rutgens	Washington Redskins	T
1961	2	20	Bill Brown	Chicago Bears	B
1961	6	72	Joe Krakoski	Washington Redskins	B
1961	8	106	Marshall Starks	St. Louis Cardinals	RB
1961	11	149	Tony Parrilli	San Francisco 49ers	G
1961	13	176	Ernie McMillan	St. Louis Cardinals	E
1961	17	238	Larry Lavery	Philadelphia Eagles	T
1962	7	91	Ed O'Bradovich	Chicago Bears	E
1962	9	123	Chuck Dickerson	Cleveland Browns	T
1962	18	246	Gary Brown	San Francisco 49ers	T
1963	10	138	Mike Taliaferro	New York Giants	QB
1963	17	238	Thurman Walker	Green Bay Packers	E
1965	1	3	Dick Butkus	Chicago Bears	LB
1965	1	13	George Donnelly	San Francisco 49ers	B
1965	2	15	Archie Sutton	Minnesota Vikings	T
1965	13	170	Gregg Schumacher	San Francisco 49ers	E
1965	17	225	Dave Powless	New York Giants	G
1966	1	1	Jim Grabowski	Miami Dolphins	RB
1966	1	9	Jim Grabowski	Green Bay Packers	RB
1966	3	42	Don Hansen	Minnesota Vikings	LB
1966	4	57	Ron Acks	Minnesota Vikings	DE
1966	16	240	Sam Price	New York Giants	RB
1966	17	254	Gary Eickman	New York Giants	T
1966	18	268	Kai Anderson	New York Giants	C
1966	18	270	Dale Greco	Minnesota Vikings	DT
1967	10	250	Bruce Sullivan	Washington Redskins	DB
1967	12	298	Preston Pearson	Baltimore Colts	DB
1968	2	39	Cyril Pinder	Philadelphia Eagles	RB
1968	2	53	John Wright	Atlanta Falcons	WR
1968	8	202	Terry Miller	Detroit Lions	LB
1968	9	224	Bob Robertson	Houston Oilers	C
1968	9	241	Ken Kmiec	Dallas Cowboys	DB
1969	3	78	Rich Johnson	Houston Oilers	RB
1969	5	127	Tony Pleviak	Atlanta Falcons	DE
1969	10	256	Bob Naponic	Houston Oilers	QB
1971	6	142	Doug Dieken	Cleveland Browns	T
1973	4	80	Mike Wells	Minnesota Vikings	QB
1973	9	214	Tab Bennett	San Diego Chargers	LB
1973	10	251	Willie Osley	Kansas City Chiefs	DB
1973	10	255	Larry Allen	Green Bay Packers	LB
1973	12	308	Larry McCarren	Green Bay Packers	C
1974	7	171	Gerry Sullivan	Cleveland Browns	T
1974	16	412	Octavus Morgan	Pittsburgh Steelers	LB
1975	5	110	Revie Sorey	Chicago Bears	G
1975	6	151	Tom Hicks	Chicago Bears	LB
1975	16	396	Mark Peterson	Kansas City Chiefs	DE
1976	5	139	Lonnie Perrin	Denver Broncos	RB
1976	9	258	Stu Levenick	Baltimore Colts	T
1976	10	271	Doug Kleber	Cleveland Browns	T
1976	14	381	Joe Smalzer	Cleveland Browns	TE
1977	9	250	Scott Studwell	Minnesota Vikings	LB
1977	10	278	Dan Beaver	Minnesota Vikings	K
1978	9	231	Rich Grimmett	Seattle Seahawks	T
1979	4	99	Derwin Tucker	Los Angeles Rams	DB
1979	6	147	John Sullivan	Chicago Bears	LB
1979	8	219	Bruce Thornton	Dallas Cowboys	DT
1980	9	241	Lawrence McCullough	Washington Redskins	WR
1981	5	116	John Gillen	St. Louis Cardinals	LB
1981	11	281	Mike Sherrod	St. Louis Cardinals	TE
1981s	1	0	Dave Wilson	New Orleans Saints	QB
1982	2	35	Jack Squirek	Los Angeles Raiders	LB
1982	7	195	Ron Ferrari	San Francisco 49ers	LB
1982	8	212	Kelvin Atkins	Tampa Bay Buccaneers	LB
1983	1	15	Tony Eason	New England Patriots	QB
1983	6	155	Mike Bass	New England Patriots	K
1983	8	221	Mike Martin	Cincinnati Bengals	WR
1983	9	231	Adam Lingner	Kansas City Chiefs	C
1983	12	313	Oliver Williams	Chicago Bears	WR
1984	4	95	Mitchell Brookins	Buffalo Bills	WR
1984	6	147	Dwight Beverly	Indianapolis Colts	RB
1984	6	156	Don Thorp	New Orleans Saints	DT
1984	8	215	Ed Brady	Los Angeles Rams	LB
1984	9	227	Mike Johnson	Houston Oilers	DE
1984	11	290	Bob Stowe	Indianapolis Colts	T
1984	11	298	Mark Butkus	Chicago Bears	DT
1984	12	328	Moe Bias	Los Angeles Rams	LB
1984	12	333	Mike Weingrad	Miami Dolphins	LB
1985	4	92	Mike Heaven	Tampa Bay Buccaneers	DB
1985	10	253	Chris Babyar	Buffalo Bills	G
1985	11	284	John Ayres	Atlanta Falcons	DB
1986	2	47	Jack Trudeau	Indianapolis Colts	QB
1986	3	82	David Williams	Chicago Bears	WR
1986	4	83	Craig Swoope	Tampa Bay Buccaneers	DB
1986	4	104	Jim Juriga	Denver Broncos	T
1986	6	147	Thomas Rooks	Minnesota Vikings	RB
1986	7	172	Chris White	Indianapolis Colts	K
1986	8	207	Cap Boso	Pittsburgh Steelers	TE
1986	9	225	Bob Sebring	Houston Oilers	LB
1986	10	251	Guy Teafatiller	Buffalo Bills	DT
1987	8	212	Mark Dennis	Miami Dolphins	T
1987	10	264	Jerry Reese	Atlanta Falcons	TE
1988	1	25	Scott Davis	Los Angeles Raiders	DE
1988	3	82	Mike Piel	Los Angeles Rams	DT
1988	5	134	Keith Taylor	New Orleans Saints	DB
1988	7	181	Darryl Usher	New England Patriots	WR
1988	11	295	Bobby Dawson	Pittsburgh Steelers	DB
1989	3	62	Keith Jones	Atlanta Falcons	RB
1990	1	1	Jeff George	Indianapolis Colts	QB
1990	2	50	Mike Bellamy	Philadelphia Eagles	WR
1991	1	26	Henry Jones	Buffalo Bills	DB
1991	4	87	Moe Gardner	Atlanta Falcons	DT
1991	5	132	Darrick Brownlow	Dallas Cowboys	LB
1991	6	152	Mel Agee	Indianapolis Colts	DT
1991	7	191	Chris Green	Miami Dolphins	DB
1991	9	236	Howard Griffith	Indianapolis Colts	RB
1992	7	189	Elbert Tuener	Houston Oilers	WR
1992	12	328	Kameno Bell	Miami Dolphins	RB
1992	12	329	Tim Simpson	Cleveland Browns	C
1993	1	13	Brad Hopkins	Houston Oilers	T
1994	7	221	Filmel Johnson	Buffalo Bills	DB
1995	2	48	Ken Dilger	Indianapolis Colts	TE
1995	5	144	John Holecek	Buffalo Bills	LB
1995	5	168	Dana Howard	Dallas Cowboys	LB
1995	7	226	Scott Turner	Washington Redskins	DB
1996	1	2	Kevin Hardy	Jacksonville Jaguars	LB
1996	1	3	Simeon Rice	Arizona Cardinals	DE
1996	3	69	Ken Blackman	Cincinnati Bengals	G
1997	6	181	Dennis Stallings	Houston Oilers	LB
1998	2	37	Robert Holcombe	St. Louis Rams	RB
1999	6	197	J. P. Machado	New York Jets	G
2000	6	169	Neil Rackers	Cincinnati Bengals	K
2000	7	245	Danny Clark	Jacksonville Jaguars	LB
2001	5	144	Marques Sullivan	Buffalo Bills	T
2001	6	174	Jameel Cook	Tampa Bay Buccaneers	RB
2002	5	158	Kurt Kittner	Atlanta Falcons	QB
2003	2	36	Eugene Wilson	New England Patriots	DB
2003	4	124	Brandon Lloyd	San Francisco 49ers	WR
2003	5	160	David Diehl	New York Giants	G
2003	5	173	Tony Pashos	Baltimore Ravens	T
2003	7	226	Walter Young	Carolina Panthers	WR
2004	5	159	Sean Bubin	Jacksonville Jaguars	T
2004	7	233	Christian Morton	New England Patriots	DB
2005	2	60	Kelvin Hayden	Indianapolis Colts	DB
2005	4	122	Duke Preston	Buffalo Bills	C
2007	7	237	Alan Ball	Dallas Cowboys	DB
2008	1	23	Rashard Mendenhall	Pittsburgh Steelers	RB
2009	1	25	Vontae Davis	Miami Dolphins	DB
2009	5	155	Xavier Fulton	Tampa Bay Buccaneers	T
2009	6	204	Will Davis	Arizona Cardinals	DE
2010	2	39	Arrelious Benn	Tampa Bay Buccaneers	WR
2010	3	68	Jon Asamoah	Kansas City Chiefs	G
2010	5	132	Michael Hoomanawanui	St. Louis Rams	TE
2010s	7	0	Josh Brent	Dallas Cowboys	DT
2011	1	18	Corey Liuget	San Diego Chargers	DT
2011	2	57	Mikel Leshoure	Detroit Lions	RB
2011	3	72	Martez Wilson	New Orleans Saints	LB
2011	7	243	Nate Bussey	New Orleans Saints	LB
2012	1	26	Whitney Mercilus	Houston Texans	DE
2012	1	30	A. J. Jenkins	San Francisco 49ers	WR
2012	2	44	Jeff Allen	Kansas City Chiefs	T
2012	2	48	Tavon Wilson	New England Patriots	DB
2013	3	86	Hugh Thornton	Indianapolis Colts	G
2013	4	100	Akeem Spence	Tampa Bay Buccaneers	DT
2013	5	150	Terry Hawthorne	Pittsburgh Steelers	DB
2013	7	226	Michael Buchanan	New England Patriots	DE
2016	2	44	Jihad Ward	Oakland Raiders	DE
2016	6	221	Ted Karras	New England Patriots	G
2016	7	245	Clayton Fejedelem	Cincinnati Bengals	DB
2017	3	68	Dawuane Smoot	Jacksonville Jaguars	DE
2019	7	216	Nick Allegretti	Kansas City Chiefs	G
2021	3	87	Kendrick Green	Pittsburgh Steelers	G
2021	5	167	Nate Hobbs	Las Vegas Raiders	DB
2022	3	97	Kerby Joseph	Detroit Lions	DB
2022	6	184	Vederian Lowe	Minnesota Vikings	T
2022	6	207	Doug Kramer	Chicago Bears	C
2023	1	5	Devon Witherspoon	Seattle Seahawks	DB
2023	2	47	Quan Martin	Washington Commanders	DB
2023	3	66	Sydney Brown	Philadelphia Eagles	DB
2023	5	163	Chase Brown	Cincinnati Bengals	RB
2024	2	36	Johnny Newton	Washington Commanders	DT
2024	3	71	Isaiah Adams	Arizona Cardinals	G
2024	3	82	Tip Reiman	Arizona Cardinals	TE
2024	6	187	Casey Washington	Atlanta Falcons	WR
2025	3	74	Pat Bryant	Denver Broncos	WR
2026	2	55	Gabe Jacas	New England Patriots	DE
2026	6	192	J. C. Davis	New York Giants	T
2026	7	246	Miles Scott	Denver Broncos	S

== Notes ==
Dave Wilson was drafted in the 1981 Supplemental Draft.

== Notable undrafted players ==
Note: No drafts held before 1920

Debut year	Player	Position	Debut team	Notes
1925	Red Grange	HB	Chicago Bears	—
1966	T. J. Jackson	WR/DB	Philadelphia Eagles	—
1981	Earnest Adams	LB	Philadelphia Eagles	—
1982	Calvin Thomas	RB	Chicago Bears	—
1983	Darryl Byrd	LB	Los Angeles Raiders	—
1983	John Janata	T	Chicago Bears	—
1983	Tim Norman	T	Chicago Bears	—
1984	Vince Osby	LB	San Diego Chargers	—
1985	Dave Edwards	DB	Pittsburgh Steelers	—
1985	Rick Schulte	T	Tampa Bay Buccaneers	—
1986	Alec Gibson	DE	Washington Redskins	—
1987	Ron Bohm	DT	St. Louis Cardinals	—
1987	Lance Harkey	LB	Los Angeles Raiders	—
1987	Scott Kehoe	T	Miami Dolphins	—
1987	Steve Pierce	WR	Cleveland Browns	—
1987	Brett Wilson	RB	Minnesota Vikings	—
1988	Dave Harbour	C	Washington Redskins	—
1988	Jeff Markland	TE	Pittsburgh Steelers	—
1988	Mike Scully	C	Washington Redskins	—
1990	African Grant	DB	Miami Dolphins	—
1991	Frank Hartley	TE	Los Angeles Rams	—
1994	Greg Engel	LS	San Diego Chargers	—
1999	Garrett Johnson	DT	New England Patriots	—
1999	Ryan Schau	C	Philadelphia Eagles	—
2001	Nate Hodel	LS	Carolina Panthers	—
2001	Fred Wakefield	DE	Arizona Cardinals	—
2001	Josh Whitman	TE	Buffalo Bills	—
2002	Brandon Moore	G	New York Jets	—
2004	Carey Davis	RB	Indianapolis Colts	—
2006	Steve Weatherford	P	New Orleans Saints	—
2007	Pierre Thomas ^{†}	RB	New Orleans Saints	Super Bowl Champion (XLIV)
2008	Jeremy Leman	LB	Minnesota Vikings	—
2008	Jason Reda	K	Cleveland Browns	—
2008	Russ Weil	RB	St. Louis Rams	—
2010	Jeff Cumberland	TE	New York Jets	—
2012	Derek Dimke	K	Detroit Lions	—
2013	Justin Green	CB	New York Giants	—
2013	Justin Staples	DE	Cleveland Browns	—
2015	Matt LaCosse	TE	New York Giants	—
2016	Geronimo Allison	WR	Green Bay Packers	—
2016	Josh Ferguson	RB	Indianapolis Colts	—
2017	Carroll Phillips	DE	Jacksonville Jaguars	—
2021	Josh Imatorbhebhe	WR	Jacksonville Jaguars	—
2023	Kody Case	WR/RS	Indianapolis Colts	—
2023	Isaac Darkangelo	LB	Detroit Lions	—
2023	Tommy DeVito	QB	New York Giants	—
2023	Alex Palczewski	OT	Denver Broncos	—
2023	Jamal Woods	DT	Indianapolis Colts	—
2024	Denzel Daxon	DT	Dallas Cowboys	—
2024	Julian Pearl	OT	Baltimore Ravens	—
2024	John Paddock	QB	Atlanta Falcons	—
2024	Keith Randolph Jr.	DT	Chicago Bears	—
2024	Isaiah Williams	WR	Detroit Lions	—
2025	Seth Coleman	LB	Seattle Seahawks	—
2025	TeRah Edwards	DT	Los Angeles Chargers	—
2025	Zakhari Franklin	WR	Las Vegas Raiders	—
2026	Luke Altmyer	QB	Detroit Lions	—
2026	Tanner Arkin	TE	New England Patriots	—
2026	Hank Beatty	WR	Tennessee Titans	—
2026	Josh Gesky	OL	Green Bay Packers	—
2026	Josh Kreutz	CB	Indianapolis Colts	—
2026	James Thompson Jr.	DT	San Francisco 49ers	—
