= Independent School District 831 =

School district in Minnesota, United States

Location
- Anoka County, Chisago County, Washington County, Minnesota Minnesota USA
- Coordinates: 45.2539°N 92.9822°W

District information
- Type: Public
- Motto: Inspire the learner, ignite the potential
- Grades: K-12
- Superintendent: Steve D. Massey, Ed.D.
- Budget: $76,505,250

Students and staff
- Students: 7,000+
- Teachers: 500+
- Staff: 1000+
- Athletic conference: Suburban East Conference

Other information
- Website: www.forestlake.k12.mn.us

Location of Minnesota within the United States

Independent School District 831 is a K-12 public school district located in the northeast exurban Twin Cities, near both Minneapolis and St. Paul in Minnesota.

Also known as the Forest Lake Area School District, District 831 serves approximately 7,000 students in grades Early Childhood-12 and is geographically the Twin Cities region's largest school district. The 220-square-mile (570 km^{2}) district boundary includes all or part of several cities and townships - Columbus, East Bethel, Forest Lake, Ham Lake, Hugo, Lino Lakes, Marine, May, Scandia, Stacy, and Wyoming.

The Forest Lake Area school system includes 8 elementary sites, 1 junior high site, and 1 high school site. In addition to these, there is also an area learning center located at the former Central Junior High School site.

The district has been honored with six Minnesota Schools of Excellence awards by Minnesota Elementary School Principals's Association.

== Public schools ==
The Forest Lake Area school system includes 7 elementary sites, an online elementary program, 1 middle school site, and 1 high school site. In addition to these, there is also a community school located at the former Southwest Junior High School site.

=== Public Tuition Free Charter schools ===
- Lakes International Language Academy (K-12)
- North Lakes Academy (K-12)

=== Elementary schools (grades K-6) ===
- Columbus
- Forest Lake (temporarily closed)
- Forest View (K-5)
- Lino Lakes
- Linwood
- Scandia
- Wyoming
- Ranger Academy (Online)

=== Middle school ===
- Forest Lake Area Middle School: grades 6–8

=== High schools (grades 9-12) ===
- Forest Lake Area High School
- Forest Lake Area Community School (ALC)
