= Forest Lake =

Forest Lake or Forest Lakes may refer to:

== Australia ==
- Forest Lake, Queensland, Australia, a planned community in Brisbane

== New Zealand ==
- Forest Lake, New Zealand, a suburb of Hamilton
- Forest Lakes, Wellington, a rural locality

== United States ==
- Forest Lakes, Arizona
- Forest Lake (Arkansas), a lake in Garland County, Arkansas
- Forest Lake, Illinois, a census-designated place in Lake County
- Forest Lake, Michigan, an unincorporated community in Alger County
- Forest Lake, Minnesota, a city in Washington County
- Forest Lake Camp, a summer camp in upstate New York
- Forest Lake Resort, a former resort in Lake County, California
- Forest Lake Township, Washington County, Minnesota
- Forest Lake Township, Susquehanna County, Pennsylvania

== Schools ==
- Forest Lake Academy, Orlando, Florida, USA
- Forest Lake College, Queensland, Australia
- Forest Lake State High School, Queensland, Australia
