= Suburban East Conference (Minnesota) =

The Suburban East Conference is a Minnesota State High School League conference in the Twin Cities, Minnesota. Member schools field a full complement of 30 interscholastic sports and 14 Fine Arts activities.

== Member Schools ==
School	Location	Affiliation	Mascot	Enrollment
Cretin-Derham Hall High School	St. Paul	Private	Raiders	936
East Ridge High School	Woodbury	Public	Raptors	1,980
Forest Lake Area High School	Forest Lake	Public	Forest Ranger	1,883
Mounds View High School	Arden Hills	Public	Mustangs	1,897
Park High School	Cottage Grove	Public	Wolfpack	1,965
Roseville Area High School	Roseville	Public	Silver Fox	2,342
Stillwater Area High School	Oak Park Heights	Public	Ponies	2,705
White Bear Lake Area High School	White Bear Lake	Public	White Bear	2,319
Woodbury High School	Woodbury	Public	Royals	1,954
Irondale High School	New Brighton	Public	Knights	1,779
