= James Robb (philosopher) =

American philosopher

James H. Robb
- Born: April 25, 1918; Bena, Minnesota
- Died: September 16, 1993 (aged 75); Milwaukee, Wisconsin
- Education: University of Wisconsin-River Falls, Marquette University, University of Toronto
- Occupations: Professor, philosopher

James Harry Robb (April 25, 1918 – September 16, 1993) was a professor of philosophy at Marquette University, and was considered an expert in medieval philosophy and of the teachings of St. Thomas Aquinas.

== Biography ==
James H. Robb was born on April 25, 1918, in Bena, Minnesota, to James Gilbert Robb and Anna Hauck Robb. He attended St. Cloud State Teachers College, completing his Bachelor of Science degree in English and psychology in 1940. After two years of teaching high school English at Forest Lake Area High School in Forest Lake, Minnesota, Robb entered the Army Signal Corps during the Second World War. He served as an officer (captain) in the China, India, and Burma theaters until his discharge in 1946. After the war and his conversion to Catholicism, he entered Marquette University, where he received his second bachelor's degree in philosophy and Latin in 1948. Robb next pursued graduate studies at the University of Toronto, receiving a Licentiate in Medieval Studies summa cum laude from the Pontifical Institute in 1952 and a M.A. and Ph.D. in philosophy from the University of Toronto in 1953. After a Fulbright year in Paris, where he studied medieval philosophy and French cuisine, he began his teaching career at Loyola Marymount University.

== Marquette University (1956–1991) ==
Robb returned to Marquette University in 1956, becoming one of the schools most popular professors over a thirty-year span until his retirement in 1991. Along with a great knowledge of Charles Peguy, Robb was an expert on Medieval Philosophy in general and Thomas Aquinas in particular and was the author/editor of three books: St. Thomas Questions on the Soul (1984); Man as Infinite Spirit (1974); critical edition of S. Thomae Aquinatis Quaestiones De Anima (1968) and numerous articles. He also served for over twenty-five years as Editor-in-Chief of the Marquette series, Mediaeval Philosophical Texts in Translation. James H. Robb died in Milwaukee on September 16, 1993.

== Books ==
- Man as Infinite Spirit (1974)
- Questions on the Soul : St. Thomas Aquinas (1984)

== Archival collections ==
- Dr. James H. Robb Papers, 1918–1993, Marquette University

== See also ==
- American philosophy
- Marquette University
- Marquette University Special Collections and University Archives
- List of American philosophers
