= Tanners Brook Golf Club =

Golf course in Minnesota

- Sign at Tanners Brook Golf Club in Forest Lake Minnesota
- Interactive map of Tanners Brook Golf Club
- 45.226°N 92.9894°W

Club information
- Location: 5810 190th St N, Forest Lake, MN 55025, United States
- Established: 2000
- Type: Public
- Total holes: 18
- Tournaments: Class AAA, Section 5 Minnesota State High School League championship
- Website: Official website

The Links at Tanners Brook
- Designed by: Dave Tentis
- Par: 71
- Length: 6,782 yards (6,201 m)
- Course rating: 72.6
- Slope rating: 132
- Course record: 60 (Aaron Anderson)

Tanners Brook Golf Club is an 18 hole Championship golf course located in Forest Lake, Minnesota. The course is an 18-hole public facility resting on 218 acres of rolling terrain just off the north end of U.S. Route 61.

The club was founded in 2000 by John Dunlop and Jamie McGovern. The current head professional is Craig "the legs" Brischke. The manager of Tanners Brook is the head coach of the Forest Lake Rangers girls golf team, Andrea Brishke.

== Facilities ==
Tanners Brook Golf Club has a unique set up compared to other courses in the region. Typically in Minnesota, golf courses rely on trees to challenge golfers. Tanners Brook is relatively wide open, and shots missing the fairway are penalized with tall grass and sand bunkers mimicking a Scottish links style golf course. Conditions are firm and fast off the tee and the greens are generally surrounded by swampy marshes. While the course is known for its Links style, the back nine does feature some holes with old growth north woods trees.

The course was designed by Dave Tentis, who was the 1986 Canadian PGA Tour Champion, 1984 Minnesota State Pro-Am Champion, member of the 1983 USGA Walker Cup team, and PGA Tour professional.

The facility includes a natural grass driving range, two putting greens, and practice area, a fully-stocked pro shop and a clubhouse with a full-service bar and restaurant.

The club also has an event center which host weddings in the summer and virtual golf in the winter. The virtual golf consist of two Trackman simulators. The wedding venue overlooks the course itself.

== Events ==
Tanners Brook is the home to Forest Lake Area High School boys and girls varsity golf programs. The club also host the Tanners Brook Varsity Invite, a non-conference event for some of the best high school golfers in the state of Minnesota.

The course is also used for cross country running competitions.

The club also host several leagues for its members including Mens leagues on Mondays, Thursdays, and weekends. They also host a Juniors league program and a ladies league on Wednesdays.

Tanners Brook is also a co-host of the Forest Lake City Championship. The course has also been used for qualifiers for the Minnesota Golf Association state championships and the PGA of America's club pro national championship.

== Scorecard ==
| Tee | Rating/Slope | 1 | 2 | 3 | 4 | 5 | 6 | 7 | 8 | 9 | Out | 10 | 11 | 12 | 13 | 14 | 15 | 16 | 17 | 18 | In | Total |
| Par | | 4 | 4 | 3 | 5 | 4 | 4 | 4 | 3 | 5 | 36 | 4 | 3 | 4 | 3 | 4 | 4 | 5 | 3 | 5 | 35 | 71 |
| Blue Long | 72.6 / 132 | 399 | 381 | 197 | 556 | 432 | 382 | 405 | 215 | 570 | 3537 | 453 | 198 | 398 | 180 | 447 | 389 | 529 | 145 | 506 | 3245 | 6782 |
| Blue | 72.6 / 132 | 399 | 381 | 197 | 556 | 413 | 382 | 405 | 215 | 570 | 3518 | 453 | 198 | 398 | 180 | 409 | 389 | 529 | 145 | 506 | 3207 | 6725 |
| Blue/White | 72.2 / 132 | 399 | 381 | 162 | 556 | 413 | 382 | 405 | 190 | 570 | 3458 | 453 | 160 | 398 | 180 | 409 | 389 | 529 | 129 | 506 | 3153 | 6611 |
| White | 70.3 / 128 | 374 | 344 | 162 | 512 | 395 | 364 | 367 | 190 | 538 | 3246 | 423 | 160 | 370 | 155 | 389 | 367 | 505 | 129 | 490 | 2988 | 6234 |
| White/Gold | 68.5 / 124 | 343 | 307 | 162 | 512 | 330 | 358 | 367 | 152 | 538 | 3069 | 342 | 140 | 296 | 155 | 330 | 367 | 505 | 129 | 490 | 2754 | 5823 |
| Gold | 67.0 / 122 | 343 | 307 | 95 | 430 | 330 | 358 | 362 | 152 | 451 | 2828 | 342 | 140 | 296 | 152 | 330 | 330 | 494 | 118 | 428 | 2630 | 5458 |
| Red | 65.3 / 118 | 339 | 307 | 95 | 425 | 322 | 293 | 294 | 148 | 446 | 2669 | 340 | 140 | 296 | 127 | 327 | 280 | 435 | 113 | 428 | 2486 | 5155 |
