= Jeff Graba =

American college gymnastics coach (born 1968)

Current position
- Title: Former Head coach
- Team: Auburn Tigers
- Conference: Southeastern Conference

Biographical details
- Born: December 26, 1968 (age 57); Wadena, Minnesota
- Education: University of Minnesota

Coaching career (HC unless noted)
- 2010–2026: Auburn Tigers
- 2006–2010: Utah Utes (Asst. coach)

Jeff Joseph Graba (born December 26, 1968) is an American college gymnastics coach. He was the head coach of the Auburn Tigers women's gymnastics team from 2010-2026.

== Early life ==
Jeff Joseph Graba was born on December 26, 1968, in Wadena, Minnesota, to parents, Joseph, a trustee of Hamline University, and Sylvia (née Eide) Graba, an accountant. He has a twin brother, Jess, who owns Midwest Gymnastics. Graba was born in Wadena but grew up in Forest Lake, Minnesota. He is a graduate of Forest Lake Area High School.
