= East Ridge High School (Minnesota) =

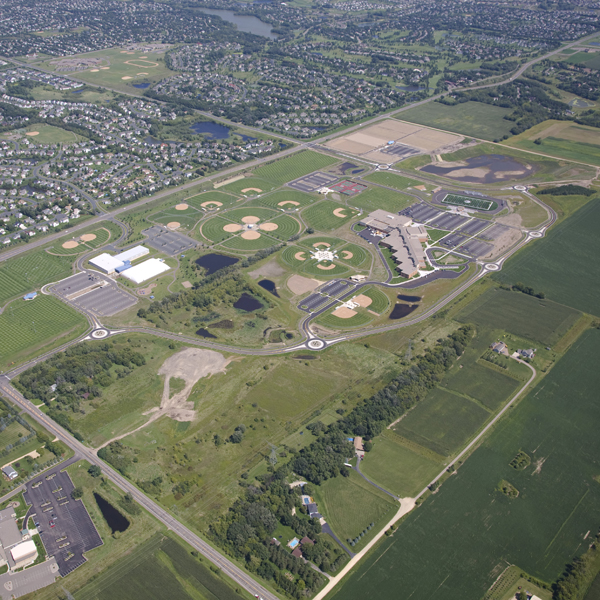
- An aerial photo of East Ridge High School in Woodbury, Minnesota

Location
- 4200 Pioneer Drive; Woodbury, South Washington County, Minnesota 55129; United States; 44.8857°N 92.9331°W

Information
- School type: public
- Established: 2009; 17 years ago
- School district: South Washington County Schools
- CEEB code: 242738
- NCES School ID: 273381004246
- Principal: Jim Smokrovich
- Teaching staff: 82.90 (FTE)
- Grades: 9–12
- Enrollment: 2,042 (2023–2024)
- Student to teacher ratio: 24.63
- Language: English
- Colors: Black and Vegas gold
- Athletics conference: Suburban East Conference
- Mascot: Raptors
- Website: https://erhs.sowashco.org/

East Ridge High School is one of two public high schools in Woodbury, Minnesota, United States, the other being Woodbury High School. It is operated by South Washington County Schools.

== History ==
In District 833, the two public high schools Woodbury High School and Park High School were overcrowded. East Ridge was built to accommodate the population growth in the district. It was also built to unite students from the districts of two rival schools, Woodbury and Park.

== Academics ==
East Ridge offers Advanced Placement courses (AP), along with providing courses through Century College. Students are able to receive college credit for specific courses they take at Century. East Ridge has 79 full-time faculty.

== Controversies ==
=== Aaron Harper ===
Former principal Aaron Harper abruptly resigned in 2014, and was charged with three counts of theft by swindle in 2015 for illegally spending more than $5,000 in school-district funds for personal use during his time as principal. He pleaded guilty to one count of felony theft in 2017; the other two charges were dismissed as part of the plea agreement, and Harper agreed to pay restitution to the district.

=== Mike Pendino ===
Former varsity football coach Mike Pendino resigned in 2015, after the football program was forced to forfeit all its victories from the 2013 and 2014 seasons after it was found that an ineligible student played on the team during those seasons.

=== Club America controversy (2026) ===
In October 2026, East Ridge High School faced controversy following the establishment of Club America, a conservative student organization affiliated with Turning Point USA (TPUSA).

On October 14, 2026, a student-led petition was launched calling for a formal review of the club's relationship with TPUSA and its compliance with South Washington County Schools policies. The petition cited District Policy 801, which restricts outside individuals from directing or controlling student organizations.

The petition circulated widely on social media, attracting hundreds of signatures from students and community members. A formal complaint was also submitted to East Ridge High School administration requesting an investigation into the club's organizational structure and outside involvement.

== Notable alumni ==
Notable people who attended East Ridge High School include:

- Kendall Brown, NBA basketball player for the Indiana Pacers
- Freddie Gillespie, basketball player in the Israeli Basketball Premier League
- J. C. Hassenauer, NFL player
- Ty Okada, NFL player
