= Park High School (Cottage Grove, Minnesota) =

Location
- 8040 80th Street South; Cottage Grove, Minnesota 55016; United States; 44°50′05″N 92°56′31″W

Information
- Type: Public high school
- Established: 1914
- School district: South Washington County Schools
- Principal: Brian Boothe
- Staff: 90.85 (FTE)
- Grades: 9–12
- Enrollment: 1,957 (2023-2024)
- Student to teacher ratio: 21.54
- Colors: Forest Green, White, Black
- Mascot: Wolfpack
- Rivals: East Ridge High School, Woodbury High School
- Website: http://phs.sowashco.org

Park High School is a high school in Cottage Grove, Minnesota, United States, part of the South Washington County School District. The school was opened in 1914 in St. Paul Park, on 3rd St. It was moved to a newer building in Cottage Grove in 1965.

== History ==
The school was originally opened in 1914 in St. Paul Park. It was later moved to Cottage Grove in 1965.

An ice arena was added and attached to the school in 1974. It was later disconnected from the school. In 2010, the high school ice arena next to the school had construction which added a new entrance and another full sized rink for another, newly built high school in the area.

In 2008–2010, the building underwent construction which added a lecture hall and a new entrance.

The school's original mascot was the Indians, but in the mid-1990s it was changed to the Wolfpack, to avoid any perception of insensitivity toward Native Americans. In 2018, it was decided by the district to remove the Indian Mascot that had been in the floor since the current building was opened in 1965.

== Academics ==
Park High School serves students living in Cottage Grove, St. Paul Park, Grey Cloud Island, Newport Denmark Township. Some students living outside of the attendance boundary opt to attend Park rather than their home school.

Park High School is an International Baccalaureate world school. It also offers 916 courses which can be used for college credits at select locations.

== Athletics ==
Park High School is a member of the Minnesota State High School League. Their team name is the Wolfpack. They are a member of the Suburban East Conference.

Park is commonly referred to as Park of Cottage Grove.

Sports at Park High School include:

- Soccer
- Cross Country (Running)
- Football
- Swimming
- Tennis
- Volleyball
- Alpine Skiing
- Basketball
- Rugby
- Ice Hockey
- Gymnastics
- Nordic Skiing
- Wrestling
- Baseball
- Golf
- Lacrosse
- Softball
- Track & Field
- Bowling
- Cheerleading
- Clay Target
- Girls Flag Football

== Notable alumni ==
- Derek Chauvin, former police officer convicted of the murder of George Floyd
- Melissa Ferlaak, heavy metal singer
- Michael Griffin II, gridiron football defensive back for the Calgary Stampeders
- Sam Jacobson, NBA player
- Kerry Ligtenberg, MLB player
- Seann William Scott, actor
- Jeff Nelson, MLB umpire
