= South Washington County School District =

School district in Minnesota, United States

South Washington County Schools

Location
- 7365 East Point Douglas Rd S, Cottage Grove, Minnesota 55016 Washington County United States of America

District information
- Type: Public, Primary, Secondary, Co-Educational
- Grades: Elementary PK-5; Middle School 6-8; High School 9-12
- Superintendent: Julie Nielsen
- Schools: 29
- Budget: $329,202,000

Students and staff
- Students: 19,360 (as of 2023–24)
- Teachers: 1143 (as of 2023-24)
- Staff: 1264 (as of 2023–2024)

Other information
- Website: sowashco.org

South Washington County Schools, also known as Independent School District #833, is a school district serving communities surrounding Cottage Grove, Minnesota, United States. As of the 2023-2024 school year it serves about 19,360 students in 29 schools.

== Elementary (k–5) ==
- Ages 3-5 Early Childhood Special Ed
- Armstrong Elementary
- Bailey Elementary
- Cottage Grove Elementary
- Crestview Elementary
- Grey Cloud Elementary
- Hillside Elementary
- Liberty Ridge Elementary
- Middleton Elementary
- Newport Elementary
- Nuevas Fronteras Spanish Immersion
- Pine Hill Elementary
- Pullman Elementary
- Red Rock Elementary
- Royal Oaks Elementary
- SoWashCo Online
- Valley Crossing Elementary
- Woodbury Elementary

== Middle schools ==
- Cottage Grove Middle School
- Lake Middle School
- Oltman Middle School
- Woodbury Middle School

== High schools ==
- Access
- East Ridge High School
- Next Step Transition Program
- Park High School
- Woodbury High School
- South Washington Alternative High School
- SoWashCo Online
