= 1987 All-Big Ten Conference football team =

American college football all-star team

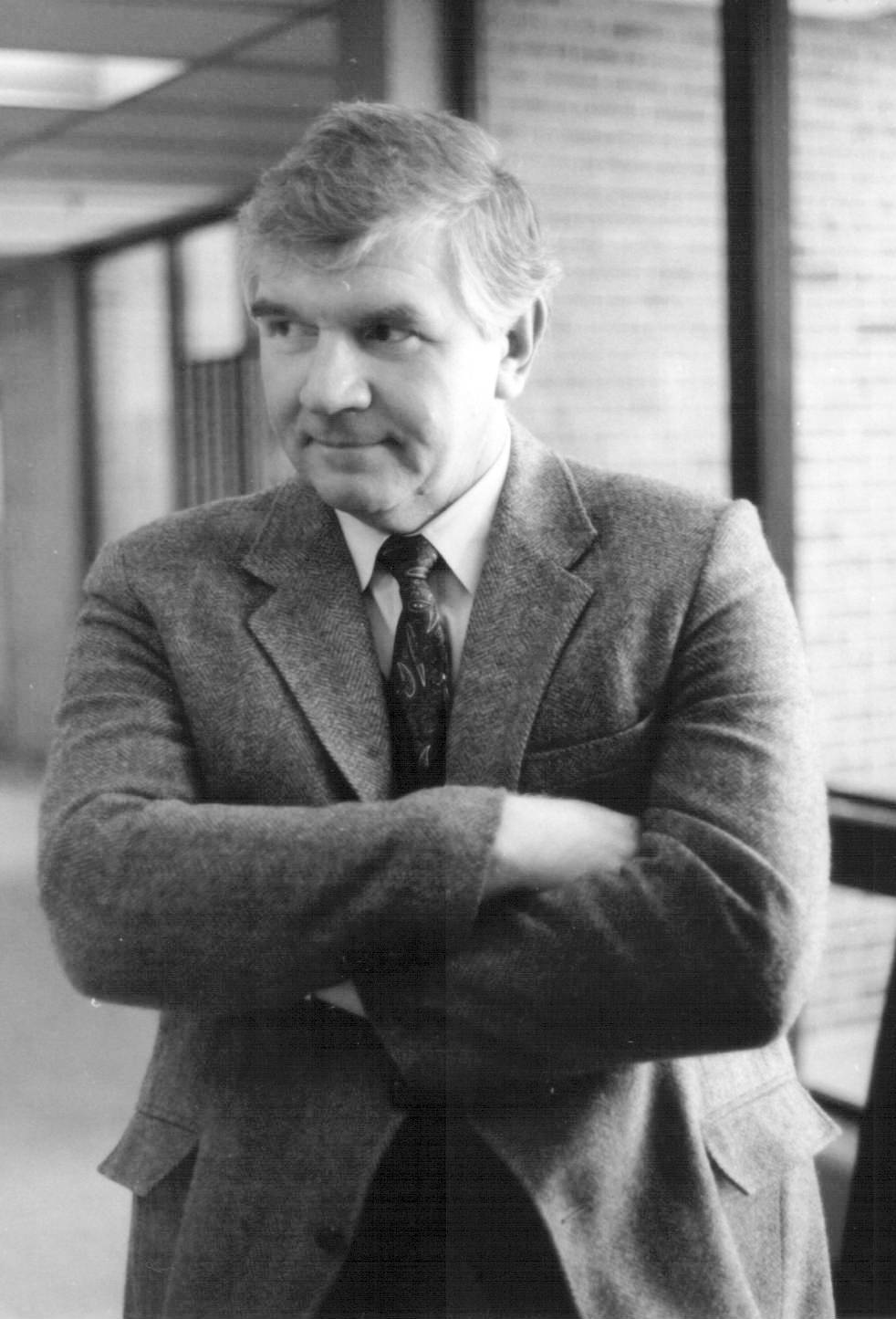
Big Ten Coach of the Year George Perles of Michigan State

The 1987 All-Big Ten Conference football team consists of American football players chosen as All-Big Ten Conference players for the 1987 college football season. The organizations selecting All-Big Ten teams in 1987 included the Associated Press (AP) and the United Press International (UPI).

The 1987 All-Big Ten teams were led by Michigan State tailback Lorenzo White and Indiana wide receiver Ernie Jones, who were selected as the Co-Big Ten Players of the Year. White led the conference with 16 touchdowns from scrimmage and finished second in the conference with 1,572 rushing yards. Jones led the conference with 66 receptions and 1,265 receiving yards. Other individual award winners included Wisconsin quarterback Tony Lowery as the 1987 Big Ten Freshman of the Year.

== First-team honorees by team ==
Michigan State (7). The 1987 Michigan State Spartans football team was undefeated in conference play and won the conference championship. In addition to Lorenzo White, six other Michigan State players earned first-team all-conference honors. The remaining honorees were offensive tackle Tony Mandarich, center Pat Shurmur, linebacker Percy Snow, defensive backs Todd Krumm and John Miller, and punter Greg Montgomery. Mandarich was named the Big Ten Offensive Lineman of the Year, and head coach George Perles was selected by the conference coaches as the Big Ten Coach of the Year.

Iowa (6). The 1987 Iowa Hawkeyes team under head coach Hayden Fry finished in second place in the conference and placed six players on the first-team All-Big Ten teams. The Hawkeyes contingent was led by quarterback Chuck Hartlieb and who received first-team honors from the AP and UPI and led the conference with 2,855 passing yards, 19 passing touchdowns, and a 161.4 passing efficiency rating. The other Iowa honorees were tight end Marv Cook, receiver Quinn Early, defensive lineman Dave Haight, defensive back Kerry Burt and kicker Rob Houghtlin. Haight was selected as the Big Ten Defensive Lineman of the Year.

Michigan (5). The 1987 Michigan team under head coach Bo Schembechler placed five players on the first team. The Michigan contingent was led by running back Jamie Morris led the conference with 1,703 rushing yards and 1,825 yards from scrimmage and received first-team honors from both the AP and UPI. The other Michigan first-team players were defensive tackle Mark Messner and offensive linemen Jumbo Elliott, John Vitale, and Mike Husar.

Ohio State (4). The 1987 Ohio State team under head coach Earl Bruce placed four players on the All-Big Ten first team. The Ohio State honorees were linebacker Chris Spielman, defensive lineman Eric Kumerow, defensive back William White, and punter Tom Tupa. Spielman was the only player unanimously selected by all of the voters on the AP media panel.

Indiana (3). Three Indiana Hoosiers players were also recognized as first-team honorees. In addition to Co-Big Ten Player of the Year Ernie Jones, the other two Indiana first-team players were linebacker Van Waiters and offensive guard Don Shrader. Running back Anthony Thompson rushed for 1,014 yards and was selected as a second-team honoree by the UPI, and head coach Bill Mallory was selected by the conference media as the Big Ten Coach of the Year.

== Offensive selections ==
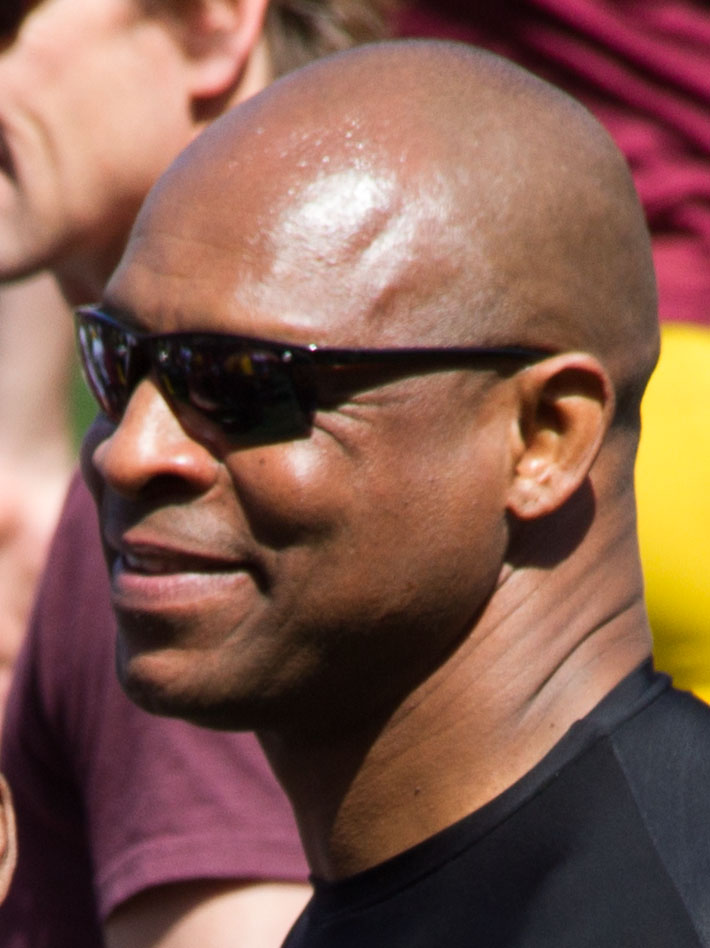
Second-team quarterback Rickey Foggie of Minnesota

=== Quarterbacks ===
- Chuck Hartlieb, Iowa (AP-1; UPI-1)
- Rickey Foggie, Minnesota (AP-2; UPI-2)

=== Running backs ===
- Jamie Morris, Michigan (AP-1; UPI-1)
- Lorenzo White, Michigan State (AP-1; UPI-1)
- Anthony Thompson, Indiana (AP-2; UPI-2)
- Darrell Thompson, Minnesota (AP-2; UPI-2)

=== Centers ===
- John Vitale, Michigan (AP-1; UPI-2)
- Pat Shurmur, Michigan State (AP-2; UPI-1)

=== Guards ===
- Troy Wolkow, Minnesota (AP-1; UPI-1)
- Mike Husar, Michigan (AP-1; UPI-2)
- Don Shrader, Indiana (AP-2; UPI-1)
- Mike Scully, Illinois (AP-2)
- Paul Anderson, Minnesota (UPI-2)

=== Tackles ===
- Tony Mandarich, Michigan State (AP-1; UPI-1)
- Paul Gruber, Wisconsin (AP-1; UPI-2)
- Jumbo Elliott, Michigan (AP-2; UPI-1)
- Eric Moore, Indiana (AP-2; UPI-2)

=== Tight ends ===
- Marv Cook, Iowa (AP-1; UPI-1)
- Anthony Williams, Illinois (AP-2; UPI-2)

=== Receivers ===
- Quinn Early, Iowa (AP-1; UPI-1)
- Ernie Jones, Indiana (AP-1; UPI-1)
- Andre Rison, Michigan State (AP-2; UPI-2)
- Darryl Usher, Illinois (AP-2)
- Anthony Hardy, Purdue (UPI-2)

== Defensive selections ==
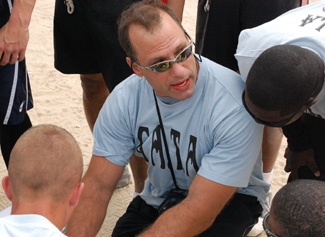
Unanimous first-team linebacker Chris Spielman of Ohio State

=== Linemen-outside linebackers ===
- Dave Haight, Iowa (AP-1; UPI-1)
- Mark Messner, Michigan (AP-1; UPI-1)
- Eric Kumerow, Ohio State (AP-1; UPI-1)
- Scott Davis, Illinois (AP-2; UPI-1)
- Travis Davis, Michigan State (AP-2; UPI-2)
- Mark Nichols, Michigan State (AP-2; UPI-2)
- Mike Piel, Illinois (AP-2; UPI-2)
- Moe Gardner, Illinois (UPI-2)

=== Linebackers ===
- Chris Spielman, Ohio State (AP-1; UPI-1)
- Fred Strickland, Purdue (AP-1; UPI-1)
- Van Waiters, Indiana (AP-1; UPI-1)
- Jon Leverenz, Minnesota (AP-1; UPI-2)
- Percy Snow, Michigan State (AP-1; UPI-2)
- Tim Moore, Michigan State (AP-2; UPI-2)
- Willie Bates, Indiana (AP-2)
- Tom Kaukialo, Northwestern (AP-2)
- Gabe de la Garza, Illinois (AP-2)

=== Defensive backs ===
- Todd Krumm, Michigan State (AP-1; UPI-1)
- William White, Ohio State (AP-1; UPI-1)
- Kerry Burt, Iowa (AP-1; UPI-2)
- John Miller, Michigan State (AP-2; UPI-1)
- Marc Foster, Purdue (UPI-1)
- Doug Mallory, Michigan (AP-2; UPI-2)
- Glen Cobb, Illinois (AP-2)
- Dwight Sistrunk, Iowa (UPI-2)
- Bobby Dawson, Illinois (UPI-2)

== Special teams ==
=== Kickers ===
- Rob Houghtlin, Iowa (AP-1; UPI-1)
- Chip Lohmiller, Minnesota (AP-2; UPI-2)

=== Punters ===
- Tom Tupa, Ohio State (AP-1; UPI-2)
- Greg Montgomery, Michigan State (AP-2; UPI-1)

== Key ==
AP = Associated Press

UPI = United Press International

Bold = Consensus first-team selection of both the AP and UPI

== See also ==
- 1987 College Football All-America Team
- 1987 Michigan State Spartans football team
- Big Ten Conference football individual awards
