= Dick Furey =

American basketball player

Personal information
- Born: March 8, 1925 Saint Paul, Minnesota
- Died: June 8, 1998 (aged 73) Mendota Heights, Minnesota
- Listed height: 6 ft 3 in (1.91 m)
- Listed weight: 195 lb (88 kg)

Career information
- College: St. Thomas (Minnesota) (1943–1946)
- Position: Guard / forward

Career history

Playing
- 1946–1948: Anderson Duffey Packers
- 1948: Flint Dow A.C.'s
- 1948: Tri-Cities Blackhawks

Coaching
- 1949–1950: Forest Lake HS
- Stats at Basketball Reference

Richard Joseph Furey (March 8, 1925 – June 8, 1998) was an American professional basketball player. He played in the National Basketball League for the Anderson Duffey Packers (23 games), Flint Dow A.C.'s (one game), and Tri-Cities Blackhawks (one game). For his career he averaged 2.4 points per game. Furey then coached football, basketball, and baseball at Forest Lake Area High School in Forest Lake, Minnesota.
