= Wilfred T. Houle =

American football player and sports coach (1901–1974)

Biographical details
- Born: July 14, 1901; Forest Lake, Minnesota, U.S.
- Died: December 26, 1974 (aged 73); Saint Paul, Minnesota, U.S.

Playing career

Football
- 1921–1923: St. Thomas (MN)
- 1924: Minneapolis Marines
- Positions: Quarterback, defensive back

Coaching career (HC unless noted)

Football
- 1925–1929: Saint John's (MN)

Basketball
- 1925–1930: Saint John's (MN)

Baseball
- 1926–1930: Saint John's (MN)

Head coaching record
- Overall: 7–22–3 (football); 34–36 (basketball); 19–25 (baseball)

Wilfred Theodore "Bill" Houle (July 14, 1901 – December 26, 1974) was an American football player and coach of football, basketball, and baseball. He played for one season, in 1924, for the Minneapolis Marines of the National Football League (NFL). Houle served as the head football coach at Saint John's University in Collegeville, Minnesota from 1925 to 1929, compiling a record of 7–22–3. He was also the head basketball coach at Saint John's from 1925 to 1930, amassing a record of 34–36, and the school's head baseball coach from 1926 to 1930, tallying a mark of 34–36.

== Head coaching record ==
=== Football ===
Year	Team	Overall	Conference	Standing	Bowl/playoffs
Saint John's Johnnies (Minnesota Intercollegiate Athletic Conference) (1925–1929)
1925	Saint John's	0–6	0–5	6th	
1926	Saint John's	2–4–1	1–3–1	T–5th	
1927	Saint John's	2–4–1	0–4–1	7th	
1928	Saint John's	3–2–1	1–2–2	T–6th	
1929	Saint John's	0–6	0–4	9th	
Saint John's:		7–22–3	2–18–4		
Total:		7–22–3			
