= John Caddy =

American poet and naturalist (1937–2021)

- Born: November 15, 1937; Hibbing, Minnesota, U.S.
- Died: August 7, 2021 (aged 83)
- Occupations: Poet, naturalist

John Caddy (November 15, 1937 – August 7, 2021) was an American poet and naturalist.

== Background ==
John Caddy was born in Hibbing, Minnesota on November 15, 1937, and grew up in Virginia, Minnesota. His great-grandfather, Hibbing Pioneer Tom Caddy, was a Mine Captain from Upper Michigan via Cornwall who sank the first underground mine shafts in Hibbing.

Caddy taught at the University High School and the College of Education of the University of Minnesota for eight years. In 1967, John was one of the founding poets of the Minnesota Poets in the Schools Program (now COMPAS).

Caddy was a partner in Sundog Center, a 1970s residential center for environmental education near Bemidji in northern Minnesota.

Caddy lived near Forest Lake, Minnesota, on woodlands with ponds and beavers for the last 30 years of his life. He died on August 7, 2021, at the age of 83.

== Career ==
John Caddy’s upbringing in northern Minnesota was nature-saturated, and as a teacher and poet his work has ever reflected these beginnings. During the 1960s and 70s he began a long career as a teacher of writing, working with students ranging from kindergarten through graduate school, in over 800 schools. To recognize his 35 years of teaching as a resident artist, Caddy received the 1997 Sally Ordway Irvine Award for Arts Education.

Caddy had long used poetry and other art forms in his environmental teaching, and in the mid-1990s, he began his Self Expressing Earth program. Among other things, SEE offered workshops for teaching artists, naturalists and classroom teachers. These were week-long events, taught in residential environmental ed camps. Many participants reported that the weeks spent in the camps were life-changing.

In 1994, shortly before establishing his SEE program, Caddy suffered a stroke, and he was then hemiplegic, paralyzed on his left side. In his own words: “In 1994 I suffered a stroke, and was elated to find myself alive, somewhat sensible, and still capable of making poems.... [When I] came home to the land, I was freshly amazed by beauty; in my absence, green had learned a thousand new names.... After stroke therapy, I decided to spend the rest of my allotted time writing and sharing poems of celebration and helping people recover their intuitive connections with Earth.”

Self Expressing Earth evolved into Morning Earth, a non-profit 501(3)c educational organization. Originally sponsored by Hamline University’s Center for Global Environmental Education, Morning Earth has become, among other things, a web site of over 400 pages that Caddy describes as “an antidote to environmental despair, a resource toward ecoliteracy for teachers of students of all ages, and for everyone interested in the confluence of ecology and the arts.” One notable aspect of Morning Earth is the five-day-a-week combination of a nature photo and a short ecologically literate poem, taken and written each day by Caddy working from his home in the Minnesota woods. This pairing is sent out each morning to some 1,500 subscribers many of whom are classroom teachers. They are also updated daily on the website, Many hundreds of these photo-poems are archived on the web site which now receives several thousand unique visitors a month.

In 1984 John and his collaborators won a Studio X-2 Grant from the Jerome Foundation, for which he teamed with choreographer Susan Delattre and composer Pat Moriarty to present onstage his poem cycle "The Heronry" with voice, jazz and dancers.

Caddy's poetry honors include the Lakes and Prairies competition of Milkweed Editions which resulted in his first full book,"Eating the Sting, including The Heronry", in 1986. A Loft/McKnight award quickly followed, as did a Minnesota State Arts Board award. In 1989 John won the Poets & Writers' Writers Exchange Award, which had him reading at the American Poetry Society in Manhattan, then at West Coast venues in Los Angeles and San Francisco. In 1990 John also won the Bush Foundation's Individual Artist Fellowship. John's 1989 book, "The Color of Mesabi Bones", won the 1990 Los Angeles Times Book Prize in Poetry and the Minnesota Book Award.

In 1992, Caddy first visited Cornwall, Britain, and found cousins and great homecoming feelings. During subsequent visits to Cornwall John did several reading tours, and completed a chapbook, "Presences the Blood Learns Again," which in 2001 resulted in his initiation as a Bard of the Cornish Gorseth, an honor given to artists of Cornish heritage.

In 1998, Caddy began writing a small Earth poem every weekday morning, which he then emailed to subscribing classrooms in his SEE program at Hamline University's Center for Environmental Education. The key to this new practice is celebration, John writes, for the poems were all in response to brief gifts received from Earth. The gifts are gifts of beauty, surprise, laughter, intricacy, and sometimes painful lessons, which are a joy delayed. To begin, John just did this practice in eight-week school-scheduled stints; since 2001 he has written and emailed the poems year-round to a steadily growing list of friends, classroom teachers, and subscribers who read about the project in magazines or newspapers. In 2005 John added photos to the poems. Morning Earth poems now whisk themselves off to five continents.

In 2003, Milkweed Editions published a collection of these poems as 'Morning Earth: Field Notes in Poetry.'

John Caddy's largest and latest collection of poetry is 2008's "With Mouths Open Wide: New and Selected Poems" (Milkweed Editions).

John Caddy was chosen from artists of all genres to receive the 2012 McKnight Foundation Distinguished Artist Award, with this encomium: "John Caddy models a life of devotion to craft, to humanity, and to our natural world," said McKnight Foundation president Kate Wolford. "Minnesotan to the core, he is at once an outstanding artist and an inspiring environmentalist, an exceptional representative of our state's arts community. I am delighted to honor John Caddy as the 2012 McKnight Distinguished Artist. "

== Awards ==
- 2012 McKnight Foundation named John the Distinguished Artist of 2012
- 2005 Minnesota State Arts Board grant
- 2002 Bard of the Cornish Gorseth
- 1997 Sally Ordway Irvine Award for Arts Education
- 1991 Minnesota Book Award
- 1990 Los Angeles Times Book Prize in Poetry
- 1989 Writers Exchange Award, Poets and Writers
- 1989 Bush Individual Artist Fellowship
- 1988 Minnesota State Arts Board Grant
- 1987 Loft/McKnight Award in Poetry
- 1984 Jerome Foundation Studio X-2 Collaborative Arts Award, Minnesota Choreographers Alliance

== Works ==
=== Poetry ===
- "Morning Earth Poem Archives"
- With Mouths Open Wide: New and Selected Poems. Milkweed Editions. 2008. ISBN 978-1-57131-427-7.
- Morning Earth: Field Notes in Poetry. Milkweed Editions. 2003. ISBN 978-1-57131-416-1.
- Presences the Blood Learns Again: The Great-grandson of a Cornish Mine Captain 'comes Home' to Cornwall. Therapen Books. 1997.
- The Color of Mesabi Bones: Poems and Prose Poems. William A. Thomas Braille Bookstore. 1989. ISBN 978-1-56956-212-3.
- Eating the Sting. Milkweed Editions. 1986. ISBN 978-0-915943-19-7.

=== Non-fiction ===
- Mary Altman, John Caddy (1994). A Handbook for Rural Arts Collaborations. COMPAS. ISBN 978-0-927663-25-0.

=== Editor ===
- Minnesota Writers-in-the-Schools (1980). John Caddy (ed.). A Box of Night Mirrors. Illustrator Gaylord Schanilec. COMPAS, Incorporated. ISBN 978-0-927663-11-3.
- John Caddy, ed. (1987). Three Magics: Selected Works from the COMPAS Writers & Artists-in-the-Schools Program. Illustrator Lou Ferreri. COMPAS Writers & Artists-in-the-Schools. ISBN 978-0-927663-03-8.
