= 1986 All-Big Ten Conference football team =

American college football all-star team

The 1986 All-Big Ten Conference football team consists of American football players chosen as All-Big Ten Conference players for the 1986 NCAA Division I-A football season.

Three players were unanimously chosen as first-team players by the Associated Press media panel: quarterback Jim Harbaugh, receiver Cris Carter, and linebacker Chris Spielman.

Conference co-champions Michigan and Ohio State led the conference with seven first-team players each. Michigan's first-team selections included Harbaugh, Jumbo Elliott, Mark Messner and Andy Moeller. Ohio State's first-team selections included unanimous choices Carter and Spielman. Iowa followed with four first-team honorees, including running back Rick Bayless.

== Offensive selections ==
=== Quarterbacks ===
- Jim Harbaugh, Michigan (AP-1; UPI-1)
- Jim Karsatos, Ohio State (AP-2)
- Dave Yarema, Michigan State (UPI-2)

=== Running backs ===
- Darrell Thompson, Minnesota (AP-1; UPI-1)
- Rick Bayless, Iowa (AP-1)
- Jamie Morris, Michigan (AP-2; UPI-1)
- Larry Emery, Wisconsin (AP-2; UPI-2)
- Lorenzo White, Michigan State (UPI-2)

=== Centers ===
- Bob Maggs, Ohio State (AP-1; UPI-1)
- Ray Hitchcock, Minnesota (AP-2; UPI-2)

=== Guards ===
- Mark Hammerstein, Michigan (AP-1; UPI-1)
- Jeff Uhlenhake, Ohio State (AP-1; UPI-2)
- Bob Kratch, Iowa (UPI-1)
- Troy Wolcrow, Minnesota (AP-2)
- Scott Kehoe, Illinois (AP-2; UPI-2)

=== Tackles ===
- Dave Croston, Iowa (AP-1; UPI-1)
- Jumbo Elliott, Michigan (AP-1; UPI-1)
- Jim Hobbins, Minnesota (AP-2)
- Bob Riley, Indiana (AP-2; UPI-2)
- Paul Gruber, Wisconsin (UPI-2)

=== Tight ends ===
- Ed Taggert, Ohio State (AP-1)
- Rich Borresen, Northwestern (AP-2; UPI-1)
- Mike Flagg, Iowa (UPI-2)

=== Receivers ===
- Cris Carter, Ohio State (AP-1; UPI-1)
- Andre Rison, Michigan State (AP-1; UPI-1)
- Mark Ingram Sr., Michigan State (AP-2; UPI-2)
- Steve Pierce, Illinois (AP-2; UPI-2)

== Defensive selections ==
=== Linemen-outside linebackers ===
- Jeff Drost, Iowa (AP-1; UPI-1)
- Eric Kumerow, Ohio State (AP-1; UPI-1)
- Van Waiters, Indiana (AP-1; UPI-1)
- Dave Haight, Iowa (AP-1)
- Mark Messner, Michigan (AP-1; UPI-2)
- Bob Dirkes, Northwestern (AP-2)
- John Budde, Michigan State (AP-2)
- Kevin Holley, Purdue (AP-2)
- Mark Nichols, Michigan State (AP-2; UPI-2)
- Darryl Lee, Ohio State (AP-2)
- Rick Graf, Wisconsin (UPI-2)
- Scott Davis, Illinois (UPI-2)

=== Linebackers ===
- Andy Moeller, Michigan (AP-1; UPI-1)
- Chris Spielman, Ohio State (AP-1; UPI-1)
- Shane Bullough, Michigan State (AP-2; UPI-1)
- Bruce Holmes, Minnesota (AP-2; UPI-1)
- Michael Reid, Wisconsin (AP-1; UPI-2)
- Fred Strickland, Purdue (AP-2; UPI-2)
- Larry Joyner, Minnesota (UPI-2)
- Michael Kee, Ohio State (UPI-2)

=== Defensive backs ===
- Nate Odomes, Wisconsin (AP-1; UPI-1)
- Rod Woodson, Purdue (AP-1; UPI-1)
- Garland Rivers, Michigan (AP-2; UPI-1)
- Sonny Gordon, Ohio State (AP-1; UPI-2)
- Leonard Bell, Indiana (AP-2; UPI-2)
- Alex Green, Indiana (AP-2)
- Greg Rogan, Ohio State (UPI-2)

== Special teams ==
=== Kickers ===
- John Duvic, Northwestern (AP-1; UPI-2)
- Chip Lohmiller, Minnesota (UPI-1)
- Rob Houghtlin, Iowa (AP-2)

=== Punters ===
- Greg Montgomery, Michigan State (AP-1; UPI-1)
- Tom Tupa, Ohio State (AP-2; UPI-2)

== Key ==
AP = Associated Press, selected by a panel of 17 sports writers and broadcasters covering the Big Ten

UPI = United Press International, selected by the conference coaches

Bold = Consensus first-team selection of both the AP and UPI

== See also ==
- 1986 College Football All-America Team
