= Michael Griffin II =

American gridiron football player (born 1998)

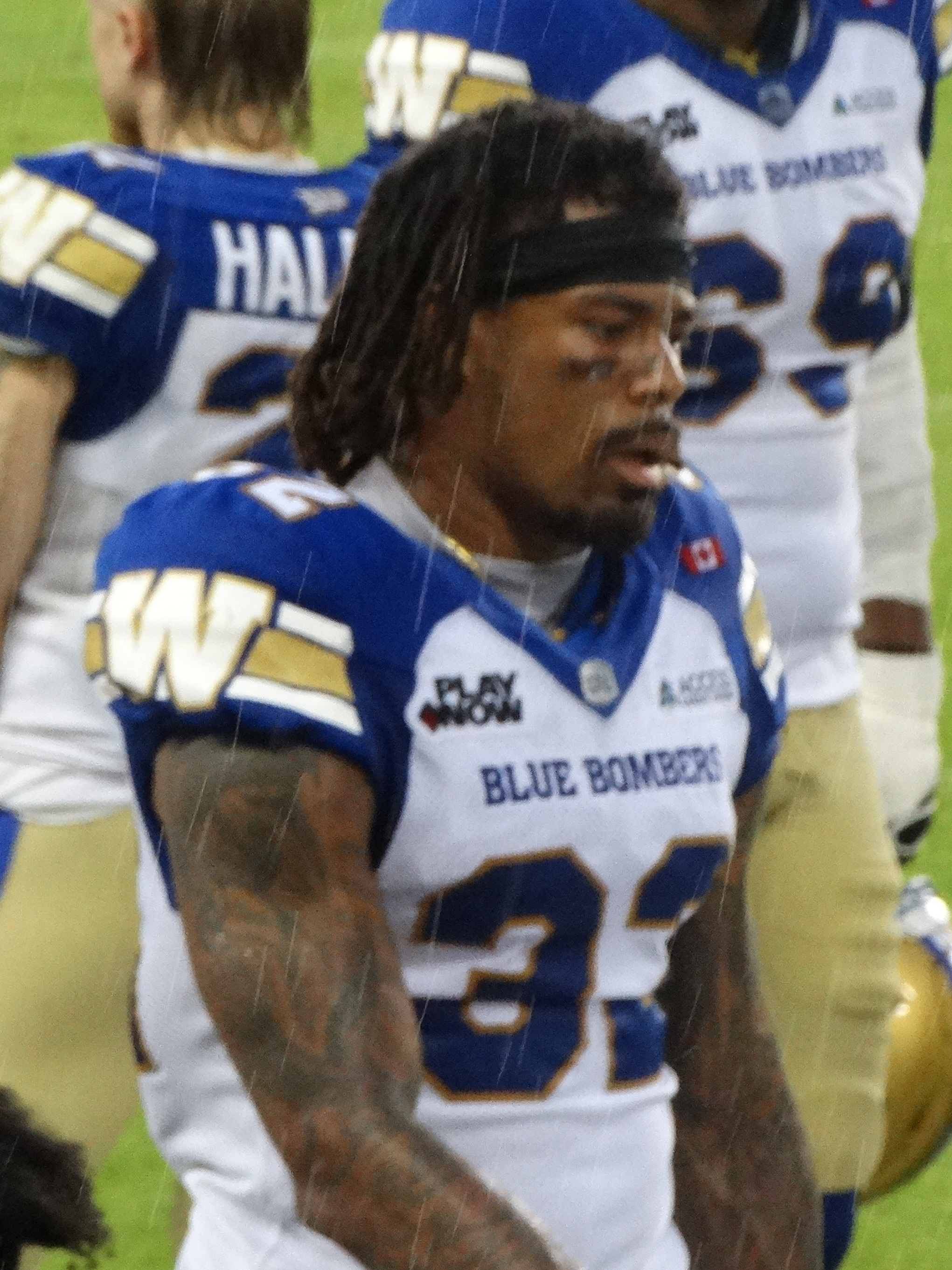
- Griffin with the Winnipeg Blue Bombers in 2025

No. 32 – Winnipeg Blue Bombers
- Position: Defensive back
- Roster status: Active
- CFL status: American

Personal information
- Born: June 23, 1998 (age 28); Minneapolis, Minnesota, U.S.
- Listed height: 5 ft 11 in (1.80 m)
- Listed weight: 217 lb (98 kg)

Career information
- High school: Park (Cottage Grove, MN)
- College: Southwest Minnesota State; South Dakota State

Career history
- 2022: Tennessee Titans*
- 2023: Calgary Stampeders
- 2024–present: Winnipeg Blue Bombers
- * Offseason or practice squad member only
- Stats at CFL.ca

Michael Griffin II (born June 23, 1998) is an American professional football defensive back for the Winnipeg Blue Bombers of the Canadian Football League (CFL). He played college football at Southwest Minnesota State and South Dakota State. He has also been a member of the Tennessee Titans of the National Football League (NFL) and the Calgary Stampeders of the CFL.

== Early life ==
Griffin played high school football at Park High School in Cottage Grove, Minnesota. He was a team captain in football, basketball, and track and field in high school.

== College career ==
Griffin played college football at Southwest Minnesota State from 2016 to 2017. He played in nine games, starting one, in 2016, recording 12 tackles and one interception. He started 11 games in 2017, totaling 85 tackles, seven pass breakups and three fumble recoveries.

Griffin transferred to play at South Dakota State from 2018 to 2021. He was redshirted in 2018. He played in 12 games, starting 11, in 2019, accumulating 40 tackles, four interceptions and two fumble recoveries, earning Missouri Valley Football Conference All-Newcomer Team honors. Griffin recorded 47 tackles and two interceptions in 2020. He started 15 games in 2021, totaling 72 tackles, two forced fumbles and one interception.

== Professional career ==
Pre-draft measurables
Height	Weight	Arm length	Hand span	Wingspan	40-yard dash	10-yard split	20-yard split	20-yard shuttle	Three-cone drill	Vertical jump	Broad jump	Bench press
5 ft 11 3/8 in (1.81 m)	213 lb (97 kg)	31 1/4 in (0.79 m)	10 3/8 in (0.26 m)	6 ft 3 5/8 in (1.92 m)	4.56 s	1.57 s	2.63 s	4.18 s	6.82 s	43.5 in (1.10 m)	11 ft 5 in (3.48 m)	12 reps
All values from Pro Day

Griffin signed with the Tennessee Titans of the National Football League (NFL) on May 13, 2022, after going undrafted in the 2022 NFL draft. He was waived/injured on August 9, and reverted to injured reserve on August 10. He was waived from injured reserve on August 15, 2022.

Griffin was signed by the Calgary Stampeders of the Canadian Football League (CFL) on March 8, 2023. He was placed on injured reserve on September 8, moved to the practice roster on October 10, and promoted to the active roster on October 26, 2023. Overall, he dressed in 13 games, starting five, in 2023, recording 30 tackles on defense, six special teams tackles, and one sack. He was released during training camp of the following season on May 15, 2024.

On May 18, 2024, it was announced that Griffin had signed with the Winnipeg Blue Bombers.
