= Andy Moeller =

American football player and coach (born 1964)

Personal information
- Born: 1964 (age 61–62); Ann Arbor, Michigan, U.S.

Career information
- College: Michigan

Career history
- Indiana (1987) Graduate assistant; Army (1988–1993) Offensive line, linebackers & special teams; Missouri (1994–1996) Tight ends, offensive tackles & special teams; Missouri (1997–1999) Offensive line coach; Michigan (2000–2001) Tight ends & offensive tackles coach; Michigan (2002–2007) Offensive line coach; Baltimore Ravens (2008–2010) Assistant offensive line coach; Baltimore Ravens (2011–2013) Offensive line coach; Cleveland Browns (2014) Offensive line coach

Awards and highlights
- Super Bowl champion (XLVII); First-team All-Big Ten (1986); Second-team All-Big Ten (1985)

Andy Moeller is an American football coach and former player. He is the son of Gary Moeller. Moeller was a player for the Michigan Wolverines football team, and served with the team for eight years before joining the Baltimore Ravens. He replaced John Matsko in 2011 after Matsko was fired.

== Legal issues ==
In the spring of 2011, Moeller was arrested for DUI, and was sentenced to 60 days in jail, though all but two of the days were suspended; Moeller was also placed on probation. The incident was his third alcohol-related arrest in four years. The NFL eventually suspended Moeller for the first two games of the 2011 NFL season.

After winning Super Bowl XLVII, Juan Castillo became the run game coordinator and the new offensive line coach, making Moeller the assistant OL coach.

After joining the Cleveland Browns staff in September 2015, Moeller was suspended indefinitely by the Browns for allegedly assaulting a woman in his home.

Moeller and the Browns mutually parted ways before the team's 2015 home opener on September 27, 2015.
