= Rob Houghtlin =

American football player (born 1965)

Profile
- Position: Kicker

Personal information
- Born: January 4, 1965 (age 61); Winnetka, Illinois, U.S.
- Listed height: 5 ft 11 in (1.80 m)
- Listed weight: 180 lb (82 kg)

Career information
- High school: New Trier (IL)
- College: Iowa
- NFL draft: 1988: undrafted

Career history
- Atlanta Falcons (1988)*; Chicago Bears (1988)*; Chicago Bruisers (1989)
- * Offseason or practice squad member only

Awards and highlights
- 2× First-team All-Big Ten (1985, 1987); Second-team All-Big Ten (1986)

Career AFL statistics
- FG Made: 0
- FG Att: 12
- PAT Made: 15
- PAT Att: 23
- Stats at ArenaFan.com

Rob Houghtlin (January 4, 1965) is a former kicker for the University of Iowa's football team from 1985 to 1987. He made four game-winning field goals in his career, the most memorable of which led Iowa to a victory over Michigan in 1985.

== Early life ==
Rob Houghtlin attended New Trier High School in Winnetka, Illinois. He played for one season at Miami University before transferring to the University of Iowa, walking on as a sophomore before the 1985 season.

Houghtlin success with dramatic, game-winning kicks began at an early age. With less than a minute to play, his Winnetka Chiefs 8th grade football team marched 92 yard to tie Antioch in the Northern Illinois championship. Forgoing the traditional one point run, Winnetka chose to kick for two points; Houghtlin nailed the game-winner as time expired.

By 1982, his senior year in high school, Houghtlin was considered one of the best kickers in the state of Illinois. Facing fierce rival Evanston High School in the state quarterfinals, Houghtlin kicked a 50-yard field goal with 3 seconds left to end Evanston's playoff run. In addition to kicking, he also played defensive back throughout his high school career.

== College career ==
On October 19, 1985, the Iowa Hawkeyes were ranked #1 in the nation, while the Michigan Wolverines were ranked #2. Michigan came to Iowa City for a rare matchup of the top two teams in the nation. Iowa trailed, 10–9, with two seconds to play in the game. Houghtlin kicked a 29-yard field goal from the right hash mark as time expired to give Iowa a 12–10 win. Later that season, he made a 25-yard field goal as time ran out to beat Purdue, 27–24. Houghtlin was an all-Big Ten selection after his sophomore season.

As a junior in 1986, he missed a 52-yard field goal at the end of a 27–27 tie game against Minnesota; however, a Minnesota penalty gave Houghtlin another opportunity, and he made a 37-yard field goal as time expired to defeat the Gophers, 30–27. Iowa's final game that year was the 1986 Holiday Bowl against San Diego State, where Iowa trailed, 38–36, with four seconds remaining. Chuck Hartlieb caught a high snap, and Houghtlin booted a 41-yard field goal as time expired to give Iowa a 39–38 victory. Houghtlin was again an all-Big Ten selection as a senior in 1987, eventually leaving Iowa as the school's all-time leader in field goals and points.

== Professional career ==
Houghtlin was not drafted by the NFL, but in 1988 was invited to training camp with both the Atlanta Falcons and Chicago Bears; he did not make the final roster for either club. The following spring, he signed with the Chicago Bruisers of the Arena Football League. There would be no thrilling, last-second kicks for Houghtlin with the Bruisers; in fact, he missed all twelve attempts in the 1989 regular season, still an AFL record for most field goal attempts without success. (Houghtlin did kick one field goal in four attempts in what would be his last pro game, a 43-10 playoff loss to the Detroit Drive.)

That same year, Iowa fans selected an all-time University of Iowa football team during the 100th anniversary celebration of Iowa football, with Houghtlin as the team's kicker.
