= Rick Bayless (American football) =

American football player (born 1964)

No. 32
- Position: Running back

Personal information
- Born: October 15, 1964 (age 62); Hugo, Minnesota, U.S.
- Listed height: 6 ft 0 in (1.83 m)
- Listed weight: 202 lb (92 kg)

Career information
- High school: Forest Lake (Forest Lake, Minnesota)
- College: Iowa (1984–1988)
- NFL draft: 1988: undrafted

Career history
- Kansas City Chiefs (1988)*; Minnesota Vikings (1989)
- * Offseason or practice squad member only

Awards and highlights
- First-team All-Big Ten (1986)

Career NFL statistics
- Games played: 1
- Stats at Pro Football Reference

Richard Allen Bayless (born October 15, 1964) is an American former professional football player who was a running back in the National Football League (NFL). He played college football for the Iowa Hawkeyes and was signed as an undrafted free agent by the Minnesota Vikings, where he played only one game.

== Background ==
Rick Bayless earned two letters in football and three letters in track at Forest Lake Area High School in Forest Lake, Minnesota. He was a football team captain and set school records in track in the high jump, 100 meters, and the 60-yard dash. Bayless decided to walk on to the University of Iowa football team and redshirted in 1983.

== Playing career ==
As a freshman in 1984, Bayless played in nine games, rushing for 140 yards on the season. The following year, he was the fourth-leading rusher for Iowa's 1985 Big Ten championship team.

In his junior season in 1986, Rick Bayless became Iowa's starting running back when Kevin Harmon was lost to injury. Bayless became the third player in Iowa history to rush for over 1,000 yards in a season and the fourth Hawkeye to lead the team in rushing and receiving in the same year. He was second in the Big Ten in rushing and led Iowa to a victory over San Diego State in the 1986 Holiday Bowl. Bayless was named all-Big Ten and honorable mention All-American in 1986. He was also named Iowa's one and only team MVP in 1986; it is the last occasion in which the annual award was not shared by multiple players.

As a senior in 1988, Rick Bayless lost his starting position before the first game after an injury in practice. He never regained his starting spot in his final season, playing in only seven of Iowa's 13 games. He left school as the tenth-leading rusher in school history. Bayless then played one game for the Minnesota Vikings in 1989 before retiring from football.
