= Dave Harbour =

American football player (born 1965)

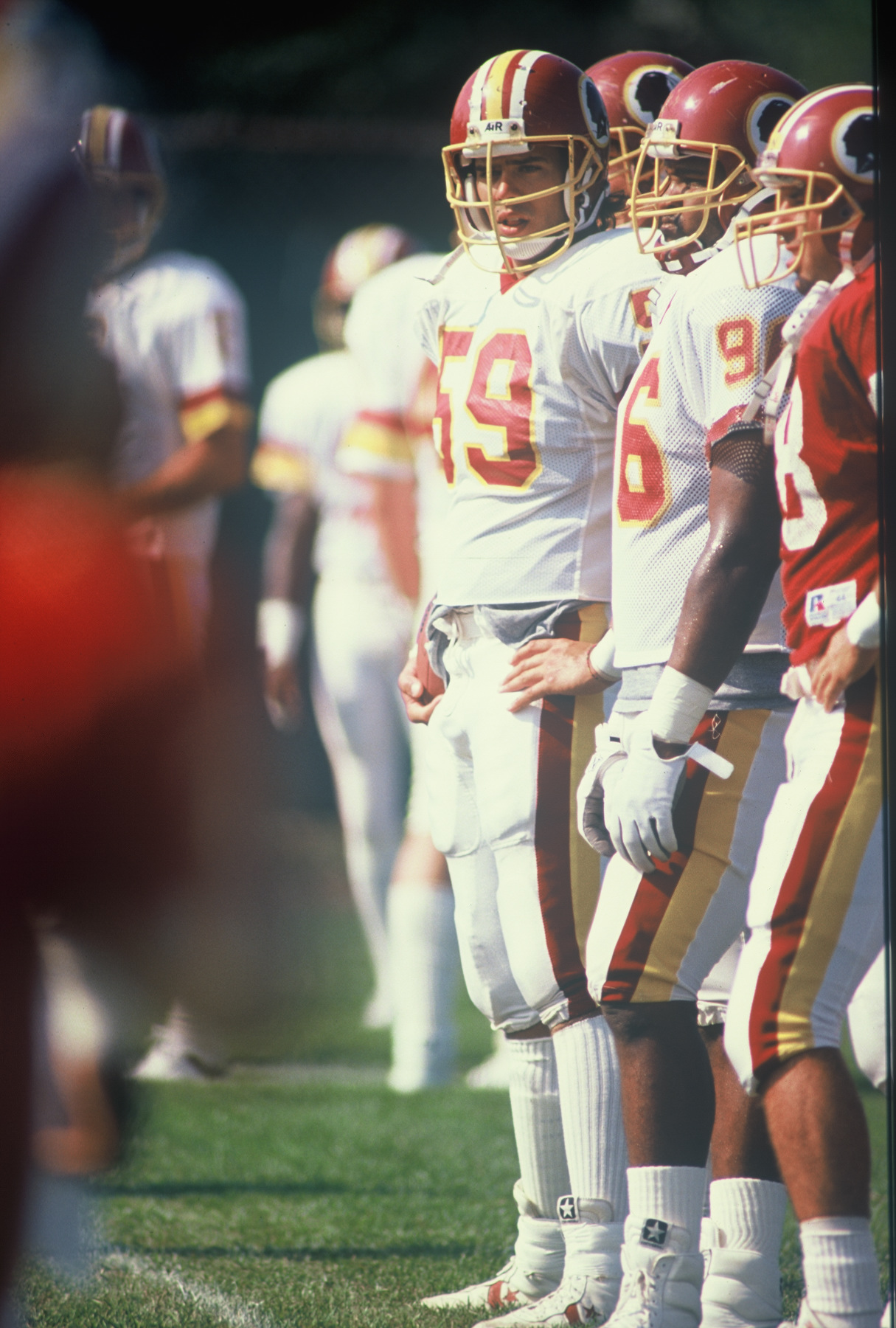
- Harbour in 1989

No. 59, 83
- Position: Center

Personal information
- Born: October 23, 1965 (age 61); St. Charles, Illinois, U.S.
- Listed height: 6 ft 4 in (1.93 m)
- Listed weight: 265 lb (120 kg)

Career information
- High school: St. Charles
- College: Illinois
- NFL draft: 1988: undrafted

Career history
- Washington Redskins (1988–1989); Detroit Lions (1991)*; London Monarchs (1991-1992); Pittsburgh Steelers (1992)*
- * Offseason or practice squad member only

Career NFL statistics
- Games played: 31
- Fumble recoveries: 1
- Stats at Pro Football Reference

David Lynn Harbour (born October 23, 1965) is an American former professional football player who was a center in the National Football League (NFL) for the Washington Redskins. He played college football for the Illinois Fighting Illini.

Harbour was signed by the Washington Redskins after former Illinois teammate Mike Scully long snapped two balls over the head of punter Steve Cox in a 20–27 loss against the New York Giants, and was cut the next day.

Harbour also played for the London Monarchs in NFL Europe. He was part of the 1991 NFL Europe Championship team in 1991. The Monarchs defeated the Barcelona Dragons 21–0.

World Bowl '91 (also referred to "World Bowl I") was the first annual championship game of the World League of American Football. It took place on June 9, 1991, at London's Wembley Stadium. The game featured a matchup between the Barcelona Dragons and the London Monarchs. The Monarchs would win 21–0 in front of 61,108 fans.

== Career ==
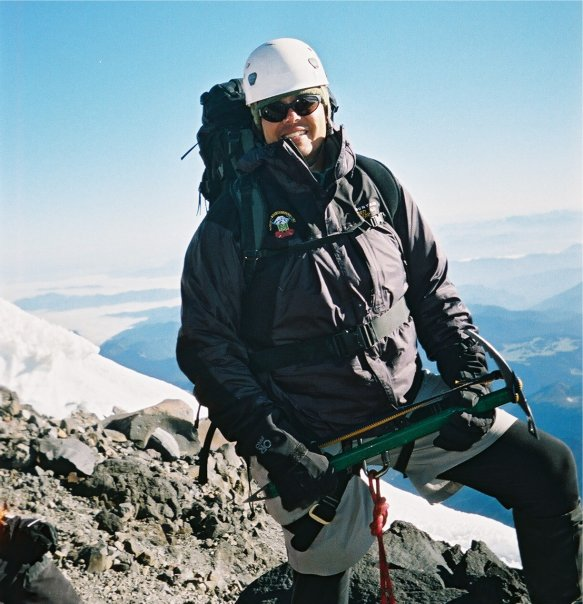
Summiting Mt. Rainier

Harbour was featured as a Real Estate expert numerous times on the HGTV show "Get It Sold" with Sabrina Soto.
