= Bobby Dawson (Canadian football) =

American football player (born 1966)

No. 27
- Position: Defensive back

Personal information
- Born: February 18, 1966 (age 60); Sacramento, California, U.S.
- Listed height: 5 ft 11 in (1.80 m)
- Listed weight: 210 lb (95 kg)

Career information
- High school: Hiram W. Johnson (Sacramento)
- College: Sacramento CC (1984–1985); Illinois (1986–1987)
- NFL draft: 1988: 11th round, 295th overall pick

Career history
- 1988: Pittsburgh Steelers*
- 1990–1994: Hamilton Tiger-Cats
- 1995: Memphis Mad Dogs
- 1996: Ottawa Rough Riders
- * Offseason or practice squad member only

Awards and highlights
- Second-team All-Big Ten (1987)

Career CFL statistics
- Tackles: 332
- Interceptions: 18
- Total TDs: 2

Bobby J. Dawson (born February 18, 1966) is an American former professional football player who was a defensive back for seven seasons in the Canadian Football League (CFL) with the Hamilton Tiger-Cats, Memphis Mad Dogs and Ottawa Rough Riders. He was selected by the Pittsburgh Steelers of the National Football League (NFL) in the eleventh round of the 1988 NFL draft. Dawson played college football at Sacramento City College and the University of Illinois at Urbana–Champaign. He was the Hamilton Tiger-Cats Most Outstanding Rookie in 1990.

== Early life and college ==
Bobby J. Dawson was born on February 18, 1966, in Sacramento, California. He attended Hiram W. Johnson High School in Sacramento.

He first played college football at Sacramento City College from 1984 to 1985. He then transferred to the University of Illinois at Urbana–Champaign, where he was a two-year letterman for the Illinois Fighting Illini from 1986 to 1987. He earned United Press International second-team All-Big Ten honors in 1987.

== Professional career ==
Dawson was selected by the Pittsburgh Steelers in the 11th round, with the 295th overall pick, of the 1988 NFL draft. He signed with the Steelers in 1988 but was released later that year.

Dawson played in 15 games for the Hamilton Tiger-Cats of the Canadian Football League (CFL) in 1990, recording 51 tackles and three interceptions. He was named the Tiger-Cats Most Outstanding Rookie that season. He appeared in 15 games again in 1991, totaling 72 defensive tackles, two special teams tackles, five interceptions, and two fumble recoveries. Dawson played in all 18 games for the Tiger-Cats during the 1992 season, accumulating 76 defensive tackles, one special teams tackle, one sack, four interceptions and one fumble recovery that he returned 25 yards for a touchdown. The Tiger-Cats finished the year with an 11–7 record and lost in the East Final to the Winnipeg Blue Bombers. Dawson played in 11 games in 1993, totaling 33 defensive tackles, one special teams tackle, and two interceptions, one of which he returned for a touchdown. He appeared in eight games during his final season with the Tiger-Cats in 1994, recording 35 defensive tackles, three special teams tackles, three interceptions, and two pass breakups.

Dawson played in 13 games for the expansion Memphis Mad Dogs during the 1995 CFL season, accumulating 58 defensive tackles, one sack, one interception, two pass breakups, and one fumble recovery.

He appeared in one game for the CFL's Ottawa Rough Riders in 1996 but did not record any statistics.
