= Forest Lakes, Wellington =

Rural locality in Wellington Region, New Zealand

Forest Lakes
- Rural locality
- Interactive map of Forest Lakes
- Coordinates: 40.732°S 175.179°E
- Country: New Zealand
- Region: Wellington Region
- Territorial authority: Kāpiti Coast District
- Ward: Ōtaki Ward
- Community: Ōtaki Community
- Electorates: Kapiti; Te Tai Hauāuru (Māori)

Government
  - Territorial Authority: Kāpiti Coast District Council
  - Regional council: Greater Wellington Regional Council
  - Kāpiti Coast Mayor: Janet Holborow
  - Kapiti MP: Tim Costley
  - Te Tai Hauāuru MP: Debbie Ngarewa-Packer

Area
  - Total: 34.63 km^{2} (13.37 sq mi)

Forest Lakes is a rural locality in the Kāpiti Coast District of the Wellington Region of New Zealand's North Island. It is located between Ōtaki and the northern boundary of Kāpiti Coast. Forest Lakes Road runs west from State Highway 1. The area contains Lake Waitawa, Ngatotara Lagoon, and several smaller lakes. Lake Kopureherehere is just north of the district border.

Forest Lakes Station flourished in the area from the 1870s to the 1920s. The Forest Lakes Homestead is now part of a camping and conference centre.

== Demographics ==
The statistical area of Forest Lakes covers 34.63 km^{2} (13.37 sq mi), and also includes an area east of Waitohu. It had an estimated population of 650 as of June 2025, with a population density of 18.77 people per km^{2}.

Historical population
Year	Pop.	±% p.a.
2006	591	—
2013	489	−2.67%
2018	552	+2.45%
2023	621	+2.38%
The 2006 population is for a larger area of 38.09 km^{2}. Source:

Forest Lakes (Kapiti Coast District) had a population of 621 in the 2023 New Zealand census, an increase of 69 people (12.5%) since the 2018 census, and an increase of 132 people (27.0%) since the 2013 census. There were 303 males, 312 females, and 3 people of other genders in 228 dwellings. 3.4% of people identified as LGBTIQ+. The median age was 53.1 years (compared with 38.1 years nationally). There were 105 people (16.9%) aged under 15 years, 75 (12.1%) aged 15 to 29, 285 (45.9%) aged 30 to 64, and 153 (24.6%) aged 65 or older.

People could identify as more than one ethnicity. The results were 89.4% European (Pākehā); 21.3% Māori; 1.4% Pasifika; 3.4% Asian; 1.0% Middle Eastern, Latin American and African New Zealanders (MELAA); and 5.8% other, which includes people giving their ethnicity as "New Zealander". English was spoken by 98.1%, Māori by 8.2%, Samoan by 0.5%, and other languages by 4.8%. No language could be spoken by 1.0% (e.g. too young to talk). New Zealand Sign Language was known by 1.0%. The percentage of people born overseas was 13.0, compared with 28.8% nationally.

Religious affiliations were 28.0% Christian, 0.5% Māori religious beliefs, 1.0% New Age, and 1.0% other religions. People who answered that they had no religion were 58.0%, and 11.1% of people did not answer the census question.

Of those at least 15 years old, 144 (27.9%) people had a bachelor's or higher degree, 273 (52.9%) had a post-high school certificate or diploma, and 96 (18.6%) people exclusively held high school qualifications. The median income was $39,500, compared with $41,500 nationally. 72 people (14.0%) earned over $100,000 compared to 12.1% nationally. The employment status of those at least 15 was 219 (42.4%) full-time, 96 (18.6%) part-time, and 18 (3.5%) unemployed.
