= North Lakes Academy =

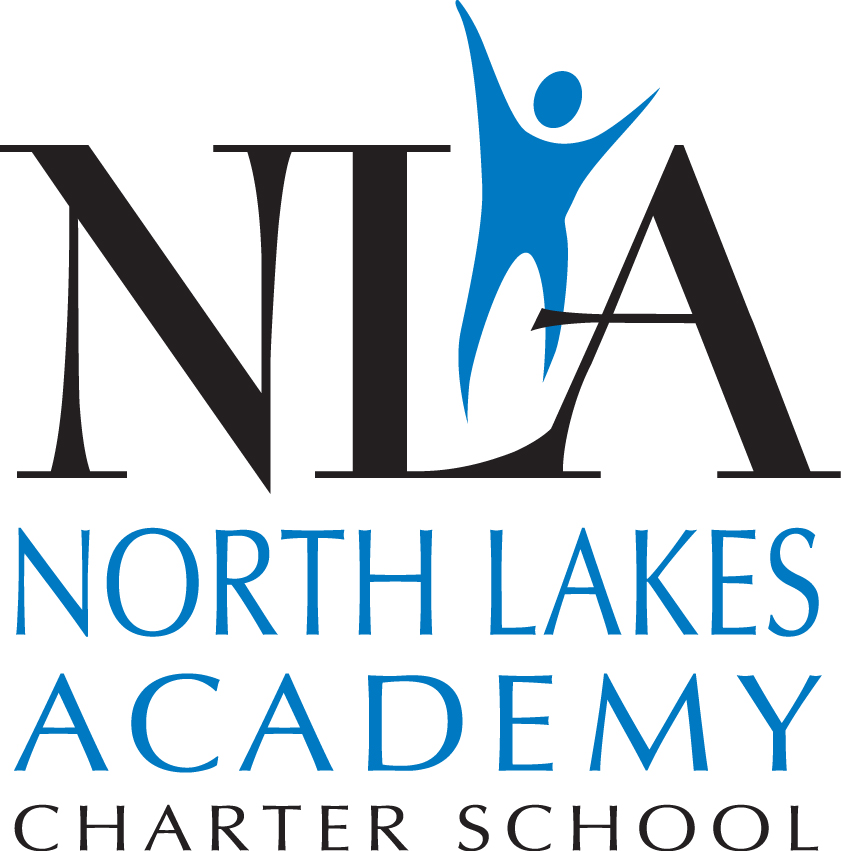
- Forest Lake, Minnesota, Washington 55025; United States

Information
- Type: Charter School
- Established: 1999
- School district: Independent District #4053
- Grades: Kindergarten-12th
- Average class size: 22
- Colors: Royal blue and white
- Mascot: Husky
- Team name: Huskies
- Newspaper: Husky Press
- Budget: Publicly funded
- Website: www.northlakesacademy.org

North Lakes Academy (NLA) is a charter school located in Forest Lake, Minnesota, United States. It serves students in grades K–12 from Forest Lake and surrounding areas. Established in 1999, NLA currently educates approximately 400 students with class sizes averaging 22 students.

== Activities ==
- Fall Activities
  - Coed Soccer
  - Cross Country
  - Girls Volleyball
- Winter Activities
  - Boys' Basketball
  - Girls' Basketball
  - One Act Play
- Spring Activities
  - Baseball
  - Drama
  - Softball
  - Trap Shooting
  - Track
  - Boys Volleyball
  - Golf
- Miscellaneous Activities
  - Clubs
  - Marching Band
  - Student Council
  - National Honor Society
