= Forest Lake Area High School =

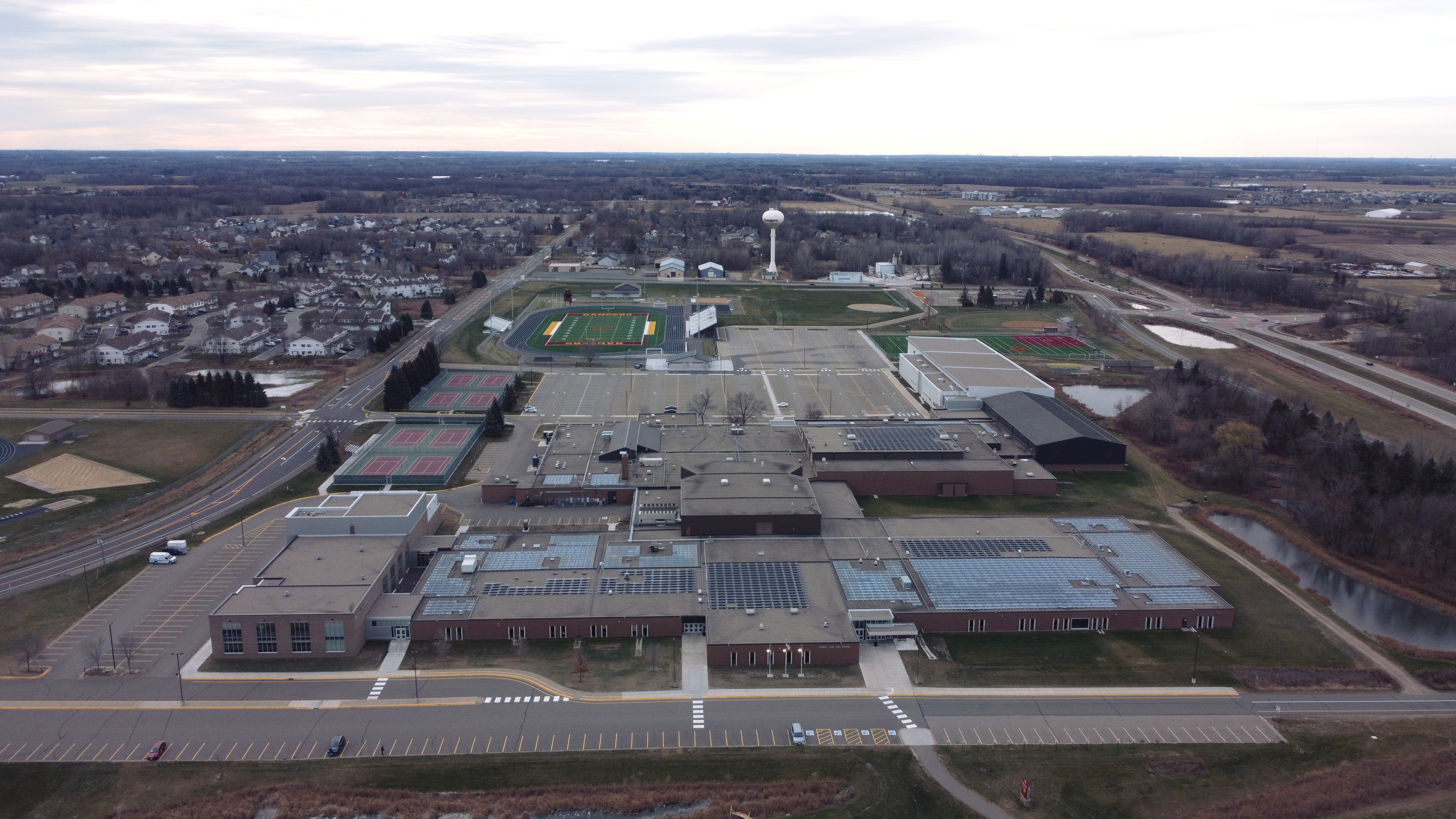

Location
- 6101 Scandia Trail North; Forest Lake, Washington County, Minnesota 55025; United States

Information
- Type: Public
- Established: 1909
- School district: Forest Lake Public School District (ISD 831)
- Principal: James Caldwell
- Teaching staff: 64.03 (FTE)
- Grades: 9–12
- Enrollment: 1,823 (2023–2024)
- Student to teacher ratio: 28.47
- Colors: Maroon and Gold
- Nickname: Rangers
- Website: hs.flaschools.org

Forest Lake Area High School, also known as Forest Lake High School, is a public four-year high school in Forest Lake, Minnesota, United States, founded in 1909. The school is a member of Minnesota Independent School District 831 (Forest Lake Area School District). The school competes in the Suburban East Conference of the Minnesota State High School League.

From 1941 to 1963, Forest Lake High School’s “Forest Breeze” newspaper was named the best school newspaper in the state of Minnesota, and one of the 10 best in the country, being named the number one school newspaper in the country several times in the 1940s.

Forest Lake High School was shown by the Minnesota Report Card to have proficiency in math at 60.3%, reading at 61.3% and science at 58.5%. The graduation rate is 84.8%.

Forest Lake High School was named one of the top 1,500 high schools in the country by Newsweek Magazine in 2013.

Forest Lake High School was one of only 35 schools from around the country to be awarded the United States Department of Education Green Ribbon award for its environmental efforts in May 2019.

== Athletics ==
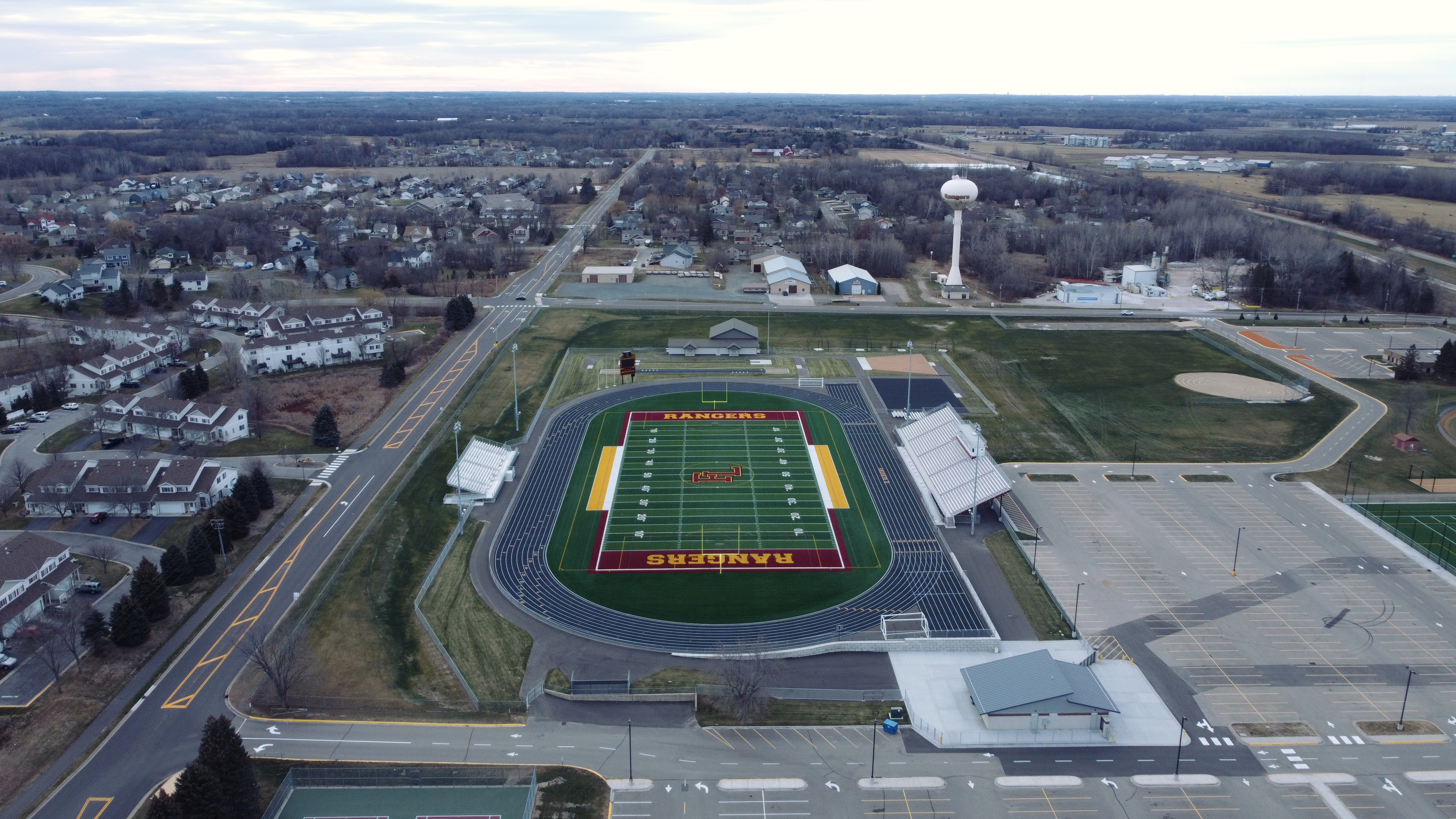
The football stadium, completed in 2021.

Forest Lake Area High School has won state team championships in:

- Wrestling—1993
- Boys' True Team Track & Field—1993
- Boys' Nordic Skiing—2005
- Boys' Nordic Skiing—2006
- Boys' Nordic Skiing—2008
- Boys' Nordic Skiing—2009
- Boys' Nordic Skiing—2014
- Boys' Alpine Skiing—2015
- Boys' Alpine Skiing—2015
- Boys' Nordic Skiing—2020
- Girls' Nordic Skiing—2021
- Girls' Softball-2022

== Odyssey of the Mind ==
The Forest Lake Area High School Odyssey of the Mind teams won state championships in 1992 and 1993.

== Notable people ==
- Patricia Anderson, former Minnesota state auditor. (1984)
- Rick Bayless, All-Big 10 and Minnesota Vikings running back. (1983)
- James B. Bullard, president of the Federal Reserve Bank of St. Louis. (1979)
- Dick Furey, former professional basketball player, coached basketball, football and baseball.
- Patrick Gleason, comic book artist. (1995)
- Jeff Graba, head coach of Auburn Tigers women's gymnastics. (1987)
- Nora Greenwald, known as Molly Holly during her career as a WWE world champion pro wrestler. (1996)
- Adam Haayer, former Tennessee Titans, Minnesota Vikings and Arizona Cardinals lineman. (1996)
- Douglas Harper, sociologist and photographer. (1966)
- Hal Haskins, former professional basketball player, was head basketball coach 1955-1957
- Pete Hegseth, 29th United States Secretary of Defense. (Note: Also known as Secretary of War following President Donald Trump's 2025 executive order authorizing it as a secondary title. However, only an act of Congress can formally and legally change the name of his position.) (1999)
- Ervin Kleffman, composer who founded the Forest Lake Area High School band, in 1928.
- Dave Menne, the first UFC (Ultimate Fighting Championship) middleweight champion. (1993)
- Leif Nordgren, 2014 and 2018 Winter Olympic Games athlete in biathlon. (2007)
- Bud Nygren, professional football player and coach. (1936)
- Randolph W. Peterson, Minnesota state legislator and judge. (1971)
- Brian Raabe, one-time Minnesota Twins player, was a baseball coach here 2001-2011
- James Robb (philosopher), expert in medieval philosophy, taught English from 1940-1942.
- Christopher Sieber, Two-time Tony Award nominated actor from such productions as Spamalot and Shrek the Musical. (1988)
- C.J. Suess, professional hockey player with Winnipeg Jets. (2012)
- Jordis Unga, popular singer, (Rock Star: INXS) and The Voice attended through 1999.
- Matt Wallner, All-American college baseball player and Minnesota Twins outfielder. (2016)
