= Lakes International Language Academy =

- Kinder Center: 121 11th Ave SE Lower School: 246 11th Ave SE Upper School: 19850 Fenway Ave N Forest Lake, Washington County, Minnesota 55025; United States

Information
- Type: Public, charter school Grades Pre-K-12 IB World School
- Established: 2004
- Director: -Nicole Rasmussen (2026 - present) -Shannon Peterson (2019 - 2026) -Cam Hedlund (2004 - 2019)
- Enrollment: 1,400 (as of January 2022)
- Colors: Green and blue
- Mascot: LILA Dragon
- Website: mylila.org

Lakes International Language Academy (LILA) is a language immersion school located in Forest Lake, Minnesota, USA. It is a public charter school and therefore does not charge for tuition, but there is an application for Kindergarten and the Upper School grades 6-12.

== History ==
LILA is a public Pre-K through grade 12 school, fully authorized as an International Baccalaureate (IB) World School focused on language acquisition, international mindedness, and inquiry-drive study.

LILA was founded by a group of parent volunteers, opening in September 2004.

Between 2015 and 2019, LILA added a new building with two gymnasiums and a 440-seat Performing Arts Center, a black box theater, two oversized visual arts and science rooms, and an outdoor classroom.

Since its inception, the school has offered a Spanish language immersion program and, in 2011, LILA expanded to include a Mandarin Chinese language program as well. In spring 2009, the International Baccalaureate Organization (IBO) awarded LILA accreditation in its International Baccalaureate Primary Years Programme (PYP). Authorization to offer the International Baccalaureate Middle Years Programme (MYP) and the International Baccalaureate Diploma Programme (DP), the most recognized high school credential in the world, following in the mid-2010's, providing a unique learning environment in the northern Twin Cities.

At the Lower School (grades PK - 5) teachers plan and deliver lessons at LILA using primarily the partner language, or second language. Teachers are either native speakers of the partner language, or have acquired near-native speaking abilities. Subjects such as social studies, mathematics, and science and technology are taught in the second language. English, including reading and writing, is introduced as a formal subject in third grade.

Students in the Upper School (grades 6-12) have the option to take selected classes in their second language. All classes are also offered in English for students without immersion backgrounds or who choose not to continue learning in their immersion language. High School students at LILA have multiple opportunities to earn college credits during their high school years. LILA offers the IB Diploma Programme, culminating in externally rated examinations recognized for university credits across the United States and around the world. In the business pathway, LILA also offers some access to AP courses as well as Project Lead the Way. And, most LILA students qualify for up to four semesters of university credit in the Minnesota state university system and many other universities by earning a Minnesota Bilingual Seal or Bilingual Certificate.

Lakes International Language Academy's high school was ranked among the top 20 high schools in Minnesota by U.S. News & World Report in 2024, 2025, and 2026.

In addition to academics, LILA offers over 50 after-school sports, clubs, and activities and is recognized by the Minnesota State High School League.
