= Darryl Usher =

American football player (1965–1990)

No. 82, 26
- Position: Wide receiver

Personal information
- Born: January 3, 1965; Los Angeles, California, U.S.
- Died: February 24, 1990 (aged 25); Phoenix, Arizona, U.S.
- Listed height: 5 ft 8 in (1.73 m)
- Listed weight: 170 lb (77 kg)

Career information
- High school: San Mateo (San Mateo, California)
- College: Illinois
- NFL draft: 1988: 7th round, 181st overall pick

Career history
- New England Patriots (1988); Cleveland Browns (1989)*; San Diego Chargers (1989); Phoenix Cardinals (1989)
- * Offseason or practice squad member only

Awards and highlights
- Second-team All-Big Ten (1987)

Career NFL statistics
- Receptions: 1
- Receiving yards: 8
- Return yards: 531
- Stats at Pro Football Reference

Darryl Usher (January 3, 1965 – February 24, 1990) was an American professional football wide receiver. He played for the San Diego Chargers and Phoenix Cardinals in 1989. He was selected by the New England Patriots in the seventh round of the 1988 NFL draft.

He was shot and killed on February 24, 1990, in Phoenix, Arizona at age 25.
