= Forest Lake Township, Washington County, Minnesota =

Forest Lake Township, Minnesota
- Township
- Location within the state of Minnesota
- Coordinates: 45°15′43″N 92°57′15″W
- Country: United States
- State: Minnesota
- County: Washington

Area
  - Total: 31.2 sq mi (80.9 km^{2})
  - Land: 26.9 sq mi (69.6 km^{2})
  - Water: 4.4 sq mi (11.3 km^{2})
- Elevation: 920 ft (280 m)

Population (2000)
  - Total: 7,642
  - Density: 284/sq mi (109.8/km^{2})
- Time zone: UTC-6 (Central (CST))
  - Summer (DST): UTC-5 (CDT)
- ZIP code: 55025
- Area code: 651
- FIPS code: 27-21788
- GNIS feature ID: 0664194

Forest Lake Township was a township in Washington County, Minnesota, United States. The population was 7,642 at the 2000 census. It is now a part of the city of Forest Lake.

== History ==
Forest Lake Township's first settlers arrived in the latter half of the 1850s, and the township was officially established in 1893. In the same year, part of the township incorporated as the village of Forest Lake. In 2001, Forest Lake (by this point, a city) annexed the entire township.

== Geography ==
According to the United States Census Bureau, the township had a total area of 31.2 square miles (81 km^{2}), of which, 26.9 square miles (70 km^{2}) of it is land and 4.4 square miles (11 km^{2}) of it (13.96%) is water.

== Demographics ==
As of the census of 2000, there were 7,642 people, 2,628 households, and 2,178 families residing in the township. The population density was 284.3 inhabitants per square mile (109.8/km^{2}). There were 2,716 housing units at an average density of 101.1 per square mile (39.0/km^{2}). The racial makeup of the township was 97.66% White, 0.20% African American, 0.25% Native American, 0.60% Asian, 0.04% Pacific Islander, 0.31% from other races, and 0.94% from two or more races. Hispanic or Latino of any race were 0.93% of the population.

There were 2,628 households, out of which 39.8% had children under the age of 18 living with them, 74.8% were married couples living together, 5.4% had a female householder with no husband present, and 17.1% were non-families. 13.0% of all households were made up of individuals, and 3.7% had someone living alone who was 65 years of age or older. The average household size was 2.91 and the average family size was 3.18.

In the township the population was spread out, with 28.1% under the age of 18, 6.9% from 18 to 24, 29.9% from 25 to 44, 28.4% from 45 to 64, and 6.6% who were 65 years of age or older. The median age was 38 years. For every 100 females, there were 101.8 males. For every 100 females age 18 and over, there were 102.3 males.

The median income for a household in the township was $70,671, and the median income for a family was $74,564. Males had a median income of $49,259 versus $35,111 for females. The per capita income for the township was $29,066. About 1.7% of families and 2.3% of the population were below the poverty line, including 3.5% of those under age 18 and 3.2% of those age 65 or over.
