= Scott Davis (defensive lineman) =

American football player (born 1965)

No. 70
- Position: Defensive end

Personal information
- Born: July 8, 1965 (age 61); Joliet, Illinois, U.S.
- Listed height: 6 ft 7 in (2.01 m)
- Listed weight: 270 lb (122 kg)

Career information
- High school: Plainfield (IL) Central
- College: Illinois
- NFL draft: 1988: 1st round, 25th overall pick

Career history
- Los Angeles Raiders (1988–1991, 1994)

Awards and highlights
- First-team All-Big Ten (1987); Second-team All-Big Ten (1986)

Career NFL statistics
- Sacks: 27.5
- Fumble recoveries: 1
- Games played: 75
- Stats at Pro Football Reference

Scott Michael Davis (born July 8, 1965) is an American former professional football player who was a defensive end for the Los Angeles Raiders of the National Football League (NFL). He played for the Raiders from 1988 to 1991 and in 1994.

He attended Plainfield High School where he lettered in track, basketball and football. Davis was inducted into the Plainfield Athletic Hall of Fame. Davis was a High School Parade All-American in football.

Davis attended the University of Illinois on a full scholarship and played football for the Fighting Illini. As a freshman, Davis played tight end but the coaching staff switched him to defensive end for the rest of his time with the Illini. Davis became a team captain for the Illini in 1986. He earned honorable mention All-America and First-team All-Big Ten honors in 1987 when he recorded 10 quarterback sacks, a total that was the school record at the time. His career total of 23 sacks was also a school record and as of 2015 sits second on the Illinois all-time list. Davis also ranks seventh on the University of Illinois career tackles-for-loss list with 35. In 2008 Davis was selected as one of the 10 greatest defensive linemen in Illinois history and was honored along with fellow former Illini honorees during halftime of a Big Ten Network nationally televised game at Memorial Stadium. Davis played in the Rose Bowl and Peach Bowl while at the University of Illinois and in the Hula Bowl and Ricoh Japan Bowl as a college senior all-star prior to being drafted by the Raiders in 1988.

Davis has ventured into Philanthropy, and Commercial/Residential Real Estate Development since his years with the Raiders. He has resided in Chicago, IL for most of his retirement; not far from his hometown of Joliet, IL. Davis also regularly travels to Arizona and many other states for Real Estate Development and Leisure.

== L.A. Raiders ==
Davis was the 25th overall selection in the first round of the 1988 NFL Draft. Davis played with the Raiders through 1991 and was a starter 3 of the 4 years. Davis retired after the 1991 season. Davis returned to the team in 1994 under a new 4-year contract. In his first season back, Davis appeared in 15 games while starting one and sustained a career-ending injury in the final game of the 1994 season. Davis's most successful season was the 1990 season when he started in all 16 games while being second on the team in sacks recorded with 10. Davis's more notable accomplishments with the Raiders included blocking field goals in 1990 and 1991 respectively against the Denver Broncos, both which led to Raider victories. Through Davis's five-year career he recorded 27.5 sacks and 119 tackles, while recovering one fumble.
