= Mike Scully (American football) =

American football player (born 1965)

No. 59
- Position: Center

Personal information
- Born: November 1, 1965 (age 61); Chicago, Illinois, U.S.
- Listed height: 6 ft 5 in (1.96 m)
- Listed weight: 280 lb (127 kg)

Career information
- High school: Mount Prospect (Mount Prospect, Illinois)
- College: Illinois
- NFL draft: 1988: undrafted

Career history
- Washington Redskins (1988)

Awards and highlights
- Second-team All-Big Ten (1987)
- Stats at Pro Football Reference

Michael John Scully (born November 1, 1965) is an American former professional football player who was a center for the Washington Redskins of the National Football League (NFL). He played college football for the Illinois Fighting Illini. He was selected to play in the 1988 Senior Bowl. Scully was released by the Redskins after a season-opening loss to the New York Giants, in which he bounced two snaps to punter Steve Cox.

2008 was named IPGA Head Professional of the Year.
