= Woodbury High School (Minnesota) =

Location
- 2665 Woodlane Drive; Woodbury, MN 55125; United States; 44.90903°N 92.9608°W

Information
- Type: Public High School
- Motto: Excellence in Arts, Athletics and Academics
- School district: South Washington County Schools 833
- Superintendent: Julie Nielsen
- CEEB code: 242-343
- Principal: Sarah Sorenson-Wagner
- Staff: 76.46 (FTE)
- Grades: 9 to 12
- Enrollment: 1,948 (2023–2024)
- Student to teacher ratio: 25.48
- Classes offered: College in the Schools (CIS), Advanced Placement (AP), Project Lead The Way (PLTW)
- Campus type: Suburb
- Colors: Royal Blue and White
- Mascot: Roar The Lion
- Newspaper: The Uproar
- Feeder schools: Woodbury Middle School, Lake Middle School
- Website: whs.sowashco.org

Woodbury High School, formerly Woodbury Senior High, is a high school serving grades 9–12 in Woodbury, Minnesota, United States. It is part of the South Washington County Schools. The school's mascot is 'Roar the Lion' and the school colors are blue and white. The sports teams of Woodbury High School goes by the "Royals."

== Overview ==
Enrollment for the school is about 1,933 students. This is one of the three public high schools in the district. WHS follows a three-trimester, six-period schedule with about 54 minutes in each class. Woodbury High School is rated 9 out of 10 by Great Schools.

== Academics ==
All schools in Minnesota are required by law to administer the Minnesota Comprehensive Assessment test, better known as the MCA, a standardized test used to measure student and school performance. In 2017 Woodbury High School scored 66.9% proficient in Mathematics, 74.4% proficient in Reading, and 77.9% proficient in Science. Compared to statewide results, Woodbury scored 8.3, 14.2, and 23.7 percentage points higher in proficiency respectively.

The school average composite ACT score is 23.6.

Woodbury High School is the 16th highest ranked high school in Minnesota by U.S. News & World Report, earning its Silver award. GreatSchools.org gave Woodbury a 10 out of 10 GreatSchools rating. In 2014 Newsweek magazine ranked Woodbury High School as the 45th best high school in the United States, placing it as 2nd best in Minnesota. Niche (company) gave Woodbury High School the title of fourth best high school in Minnesota.

== Athletics ==
=== Girls Basketball ===
The girls basketball team won the AAAA Minnesota State Championship in 2003, finishing the season with a record of 29-0. Other highlights for the girls basketball team under coach Dave Preller from 1987 to 2011 include: 10 State Tournament appearances and a winning percentage of .808 (512 wins, 122 losses).

=== Boys Basketball ===
The boys basketball team won the AA Minnesota State Championship in 1983. The team went undefeated (24-0), the season culminating with a 56-50 overtime victory over Coon Rapids (featuring future NBA player Tom Copa) in the state final.

== Controversies ==
=== The Shirt Incident ===
In 2001 the school created homophobia-free areas called "safe zones" designated by an inverted pink triangle and intended for gay students. Student Elliot Chambers reacted by wearing a makeshift sweatshirt with the slogan "Straight Pride" and the image of male and female stick figures holding hands. In light of previous anti-gay incidents, the school's principal ordered Chambers to remove the shirt, and a court case ensued. A court upheld Chambers' complaint that his First Amendment rights had been violated, and that the principal's decision was unjustified. Although praising the principal's intentions, the judge explained that views of both sides of the debate should be allowed and that such issues should be resolved within the school's community, not within the court system. Under the Tinker case, the court stated that the substantial disruptions claimed by the school must be shown to have some connection to Chambers' sweatshirt message of "Straight Pride".

=== George Floyd murder reenactment controversy (2024) ===
On October 14, 2024, Woodbury High School was involved in a national controversy after a substitute teacher there was accused of reenacting the 2020 murder of George Floyd. Steven Williams, an off-duty police officer from the Prescott Police Department in Wisconsin, was identified as the substitute teacher responsible for the alleged reenactment.

At the time, he was substituting for an English teacher. Sources report that Williams placed a student on the floor and demonstrated how police had restrained Floyd. Students claimed that besides demonstrating Floyd's restraint, Williams made racially harmful remarks and told sexist jokes.

Williams also reportedly denied the existence of police brutality and mimicked pointing a gun at students. Furthermore, he allegedly shared disturbing details about dead bodies he had seen and sexual assault cases he investigated during his time as an officer. School administrators responded by removing Williams from the classroom and forbidding him from returning to South Washington County Schools property. Williams' substitute teaching agency terminated his employment, and the Prescott Police Department placed him on administrative leave. The incident gained national and international attention, with the Associated Press, CBS News, and British news outlets covering it. Local authorities and Minnesota education officials subsequently investigated the incident.

Williams resigned from the Prescott Police Department in November 2024 in lieu of termination. In January 2025, prosecutors decided not to file criminal charges against Williams in relation to the incident. However, disciplinary proceedings continued at the state level. On August 15, 2025, Minnesota's Professional Educator Licensing and Standards Board revoked Williams' teaching license after determining that his conduct violated state law and endangered students' physical and mental safety.

== Music department ==
The Woodbury Music Department supports a very comprehensive music program. The program includes 3 concert bands, 2 jazz ensembles, a marching band, a pep band, 3 orchestras, and 2 chamber orchestras

=== School Bands ===
Woodbury High School hosts a varsity band, a symphony band, a concert band, and a marching band.

==== Varsity Band ====
The Varsity Band is composed to mostly high school freshmen, but may include older students who are restarting their band process.

==== Concert Band ====
The Concert Band is the advanced level band and is the band program's premier and award-winning performing ensemble. In the year 2016, the Concert band traveled to Denver, Colorado.

=== Jazz Ensembles ===
The Woodbury HS Jazz Ensembles perform jazz music of many styles when they appear in community events and concert performances. Jazz events begin in late November as the Marching Band season comes to an end.

=== Marching Royals ===
The Marching Royals are made up of an all-volunteer group of students from grades 9-12 who are a part of the Woodbury High School Band Program. The Woodbury Royals marching band performs at every home football game under the lights.

The Marching Royals have performed across the nation; including the 2013 Saint Patrick's Day Parade in New York City, halftime at a Minnesota Vikings game at Mall of America Field in the fall of 2013, and in front of 30,000 spectators in the Disney Festival of Fantasy parade at Disney World in Orlando, FL. During the Fall of 2016 the Marching Royals played at the 75th anniversary of the Pearl Harbor attack in Hawai'i.

=== Pep Band ===
The Woodbury High School Pep Band is composed of all the members of the band program. As a part of regular band class, students perform for select athletic events throughout the school year. The Pep Band also accompanies select Woodbury sports teams to state.

=== Orchestras ===
Woodbury High School has three orchestras along with two chambers. The three orchestras are: Varsity, Sinfonia, and Concert.

=== Choir ===
Woodbury High School has two choirs: Royal Choir and Concert Choir.

=== Royal Theatre ===
In 2023 The Royal Theatre was 3AA One Act runner-up.

== Notable alumni ==
Woodbury High School alumni of note:

- Lou Ayeni, former NFL player and coach
- Michelle Fischbach, US Representative and former Minnesota Lieutenant Governor
- Brent Kallman, professional soccer player
- Brian Kallman, former professional soccer player
- Kassey Kallman, former professional soccer player
- Allan Kingdom, rapper and record producer
- Chip Lohmiller, former NFL player
- Adam Mazur, 2nd round pick (53rd overall) MLB Draft, 2022, San Diego Padres
- Max Meyer, 1st round pick (3rd overall) MLB Draft, 2020, Miami Marlins
- Nicole Mitchell, meteorologist and former Minnesota State Senator
- Devin Padelford, professional soccer player
- Eric C. Tostrud, United States District Judge of the United States District Court for the District of Minnesota.
- Michelle Young, reality TV star, The Bachelor Season 25 (runner up) and the star of The Bachelorette Season 18

== Notable faculty ==
Woodbury High School teachers of note:

- Len Price, Social Studies teacher and Minnesota State Representative and Senator
