= Forest Lake, Minnesota =

City in Minnesota, United States

- City
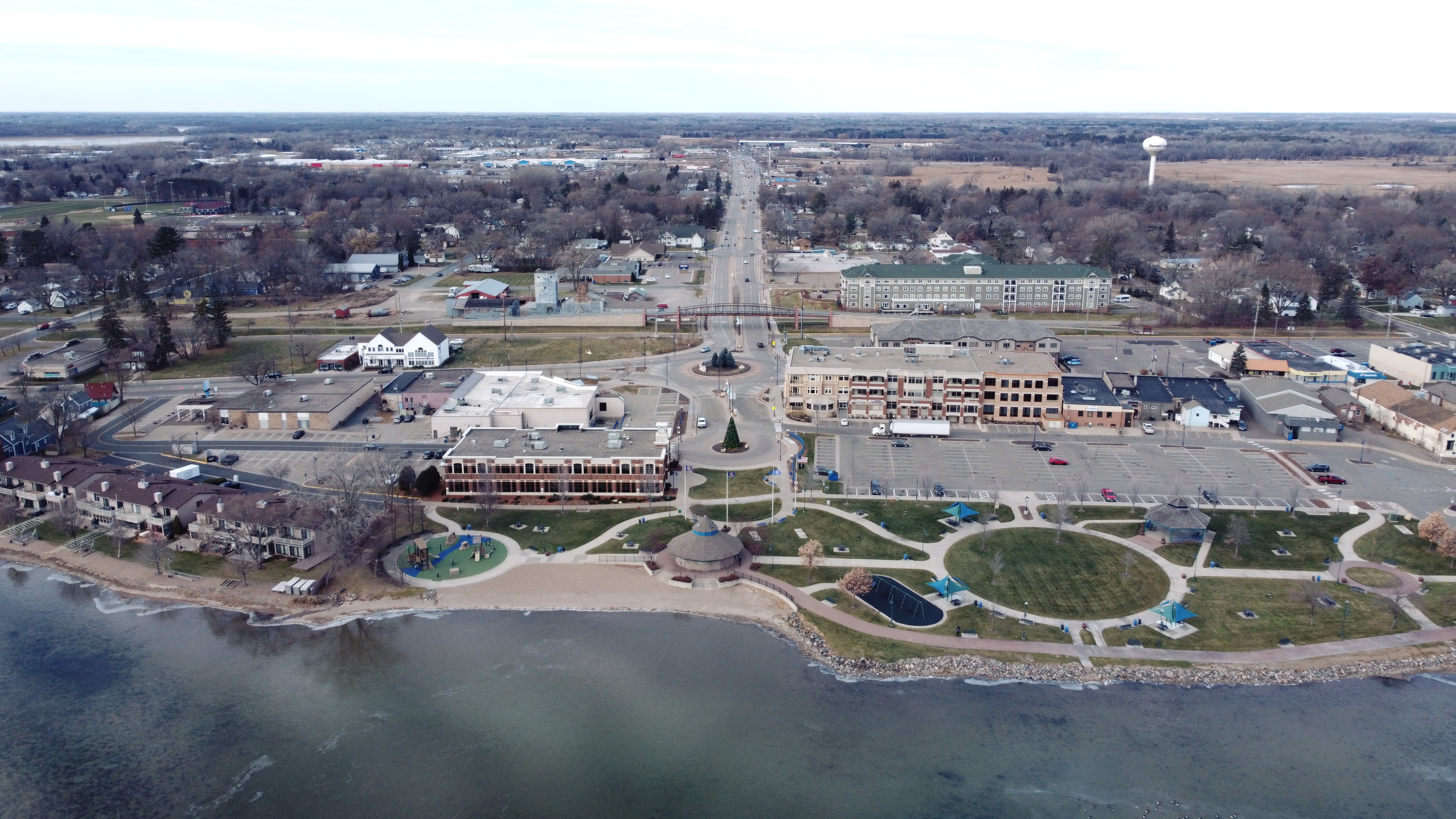
- Downtown Forest Lake
- Motto: As Good As It Sounds
- Location within Washington County and Minnesota
- Coordinates: 45°15′13″N 92°57′30″W
- Country: United States
- State: Minnesota
- County: Washington
- Founded: March 11, 1874
- Incorporated: 1896

Government
  - Type: Mayor–council government
  - Mayor: Mara Bain (I)

Area
  - Total: 35.53 sq mi (92.01 km^{2})
  - Land: 30.54 sq mi (79.10 km^{2})
  - Water: 4.99 sq mi (12.92 km^{2})
- Elevation: 935 ft (285 m)

Population (2020)
  - Total: 20,611
  - Estimate (2022): 20,857
  - Density: 674.9/sq mi (260.58/km^{2})
- Time zone: UTC–6 (Central (CST))
  - Summer (DST): UTC–5 (CDT)
- ZIP code: 55025
- Area code: 651
- FIPS code: 27-21770
- GNIS feature ID: 2394789
- Sales tax: 8.375%
- Website: ci.forest-lake.mn.us

Forest Lake is a city in Washington County, Minnesota, United States, 27 miles northeast of Saint Paul and 29 miles northeast of Minneapolis. The population was 20,611 at the 2020 census.

== History ==
Forest Lake began as a stop on the Lake Superior & Mississippi Railroad (later reorganized as the St. Paul and Duluth Railroad Company in 1877). The first train reached Forest Lake on December 9, 1868. The lake was named for the abundant timber that lines its shores. Forest Lake Township was organized on March 11, 1874. The first one-room school was built that year at the former location of City Hall (220 N. Lake Street). The city of Forest Lake was incorporated on July 11, 1893, with 175 residents. In 2001, the city annexed the surrounding former Forest Lake Township.

== Geography ==
According to the United States Census Bureau, the city has an area of 35.54 square miles (92.05 km^{2}); 30.56 square miles (79.15 km^{2}) is land and 4.98 square miles (12.90 km^{2}) is water.

== Demographics ==
Historical population
| Census | Pop. | Note | %± |
|---|---|---|---|
| 1880 | 46 | | — |
| 1900 | 241 | | — |
| 1910 | 540 | | 124.1% |
| 1920 | 800 | | 48.1% |
| 1930 | 916 | | 14.5% |
| 1940 | 1,120 | | 22.3% |
| 1950 | 1,766 | | 57.7% |
| 1960 | 2,347 | | 32.9% |
| 1970 | 3,207 | | 36.6% |
| 1980 | 4,596 | | 43.3% |
| 1990 | 5,833 | | 26.9% |
| 2000 | 6,856 | | 17.5% |
| 2010 | 18,375 | | 168.0% |
| 2020 | 20,611 | | 12.2% |
| 2022 (est.) | 20,857 | | 1.2% |
U.S. Decennial Census; 2020 Census

=== 2020 census ===
As of the 2020 census, Forest Lake had a population of 20,611. The median age was 39.1 years. 24.3% of residents were under the age of 18 and 16.5% were 65 years of age or older. For every 100 females there were 96.5 males, and for every 100 females age 18 and over there were 95.5 males age 18 and over.

86.4% of residents lived in urban areas, while 13.6% lived in rural areas.

There were 8,131 households in Forest Lake, of which 31.7% had children under the age of 18 living in them. Of all households, 50.6% were married-couple households, 17.1% were households with a male householder and no spouse or partner present, and 23.4% were households with a female householder and no spouse or partner present. About 25.0% of all households were made up of individuals and 10.4% had someone living alone who was 65 years of age or older.

There were 8,569 housing units, of which 5.1% were vacant. The homeowner vacancy rate was 1.2% and the rental vacancy rate was 5.0%.

Racial composition as of the 2020 census
| Race | Number | Percent |
|---|---|---|
| White | 18,196 | 88.3% |
| Black or African American | 350 | 1.7% |
| American Indian and Alaska Native | 91 | 0.4% |
| Asian | 547 | 2.7% |
| Native Hawaiian and Other Pacific Islander | 4 | 0.0% |
| Some other race | 239 | 1.2% |
| Two or more races | 1,184 | 5.7% |
| Hispanic or Latino (of any race) | 782 | 3.8% |

=== Income ===
Average household income for 2024 was $123,651. Per capita income was $45,527.

== Politics ==
Forest Lake is in Minnesota's 8th congressional district.

- Mayor: Blake Roberts
- Council: Renee Feagan, Leif Erickson, Jeff Larson, Kevin Miller
- City Administrator: open
- State Senator: Karin Housley
- State Representative: Patricia Anderson and Josiah Hill

== Public schools ==
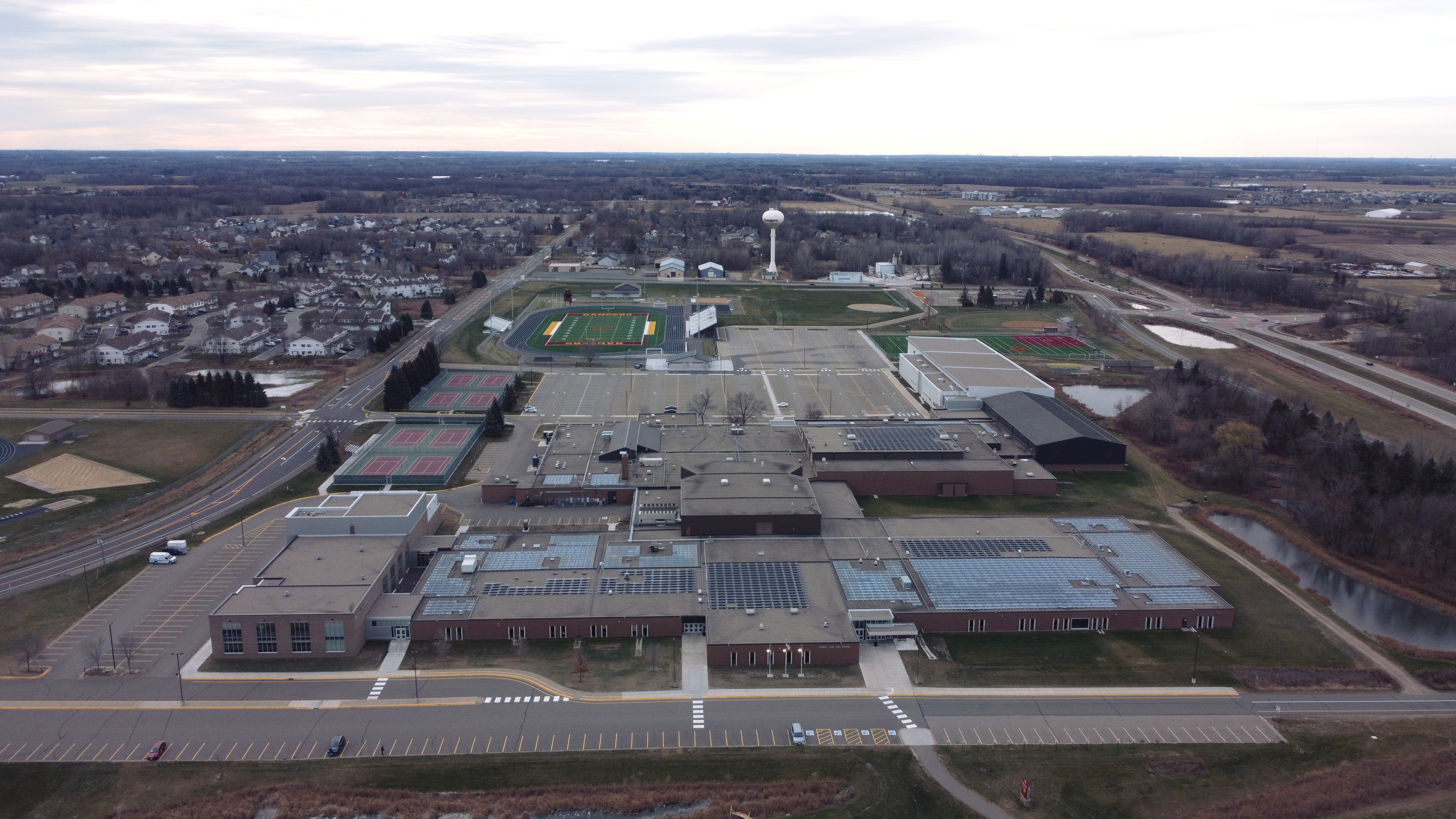
Forest Lake Area High School

The Forest Lake Area school system includes seven elementary sites, one middle school site, and one high school site. There are also two independent districts, North Lakes Academy and Lakes International Language Academy.

=== Elementary schools (grades K–6) ===
- Columbus (K–6)
- Forest View (K–5)
- Lakes International Language Academy (K–5)
- Lino Lakes (K–6 STEM)
- Linwood (K–6)
- North Lakes Academy (K–6)
- St. Peter Catholic School (preschool–8)
- Scandia (K–6)
- Wyoming (preschool–6)

=== Secondary schools (grades 6–12) ===
- Forest Lake Area High School (grades 9–12)
- Forest Lake Area Middle School (grades 6–8)
- North Lakes Academy (grades 7–12)
- Lakes International Language Academy (grades 6–12)
- St. Peter Catholic School (grades 7–8)

== Sports Facilities ==
- Forest Lake Sports Center
- Fenway Park
- Tanners Brook Golf Club
- Forest Hills Golf Club
- Forest Lake Sportsman's Club

== Media ==
The first newspaper, The Enterprise, was printed in 1903. It was renamed The Forest Lake Advertiser in 1907 and The Forest Lake Times in 1916. The Lowdown is another local paper.

== Notable people ==
=== Arts and entertainment, journalists, writers ===
- Dan Andersson, Swedish author, poet and composer, lived in Forest Lake from 1901 to 1903
- John Caddy, poet and naturalist, resident of Forest Lake
- Douglas Harper, sociologist, author, photographer, resident of Forest Lake
- Rich Matteson, jazz artist, educator, born in Forest Lake
- H. Keith Melton, author/collector, resident of Forest Lake
- Carol Muske-Dukes, poet and novelist, grew up in Forest Lake
- Terry Redlin, artist, lived in Forest Lake in the 1960s
- Anni Rossi, singer, violist, keyboardist, and recording artist
- Christopher Sieber, actor
- Jordis Unga, rock singer and songwriter

=== Politics and public service ===
- Elmer L. Andersen, 30th governor of Minnesota, resident of Forest Lake
- James B. Bullard, chief executive officer and president of the Federal Reserve Bank of St. Louis
- Arne Carlson, former governor of Minnesota, former resident of Forest Lake
- Robert Carothers, former president of the University of Rhode Island, lived in Forest Lake
- Pete Hegseth, United States Secretary of Defense, raised in Forest Lake
- Melvin Starkey Henderson, orthopedic surgeon, raised in Forest Lake
- William Rush Merriam, governor of Minnesota from 1889 to 1893
- Walter Mondale, former vice president of the United States, former resident of Forest Lake
- Doug Swenson, Minnesota state representative, lawyer, and judge

=== Newsmakers ===
- T. Eugene Thompson, attorney, summer resident who hired a hit man to kill his wife in 1963
- Bugs Moran, Chicago Prohibition-era gangster, lived in Forest Lake in the early 1930s

=== Sports ===
- Rick Bayless, 1986 All-Big 10 and Minnesota Vikings running back
- Dick Furey, professional basketball player, lived in Forest Lake and coached at Forest Lake Area High School
- Brandon Girtz, mixed martial artist, born and raised in Forest Lake
- Bud Grant, Hall of Fame coach National Football League and Canadian Football League lived in Forest Lake in the 1950s
- Nora Greenwald (aka Molly Holly), former WWE world champion pro wrestler
- Adam Haayer, National Football League player, graduate of Forest Lake Area High School
- Hal Haskins, professional basketball player, lived in Forest Lake and coached at Forest Lake Area High School
- Wilfred T. Houle, former National Football League player with the Minneapolis Marines
- Dave Menne, former Ultimate Fighting Championship middleweight champion
- Dick Nesbitt, National Football League former Chicago Bears running back, was a former resident
- Leif Nordgren, two-time Winter Olympic Games biathlon competitor
- Bud Nygren, professional football player and college coach
- Arron Oberholser, professional PGA Tour golfer, was a former resident
- Brian Raabe, former Minnesota Twins player, lived in Forest Lake and coached at Forest Lake Area High School
- Jack Trudeau, former National Football League quarterback, was born in Forest Lake in 1962
- Matt Wallner, Minnesota Twins outfielder
