= 2021 Illinois vs. Penn State football game =

2021 American college football game

- Conference game
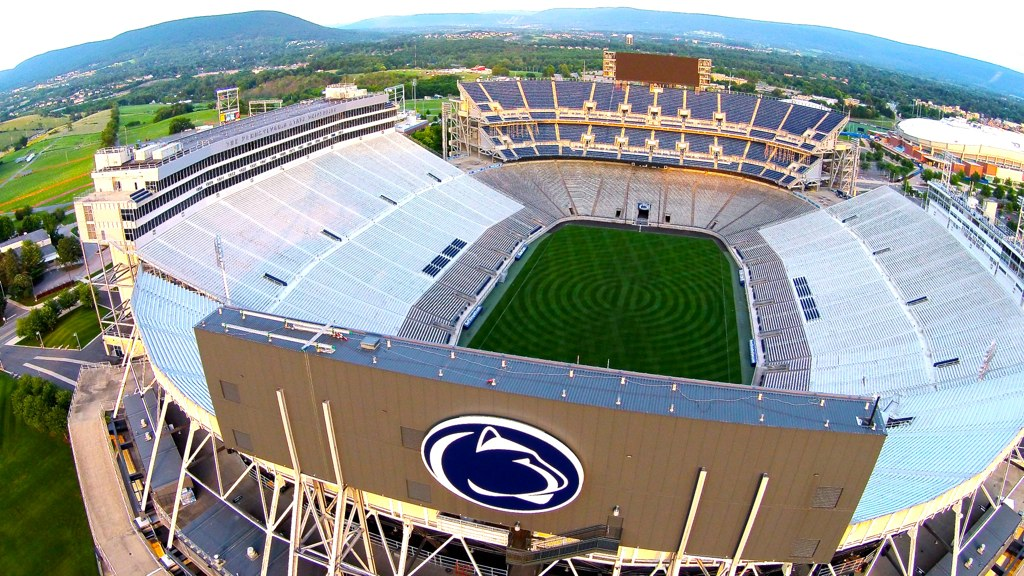
- Beaver Stadium, the site of the game
Illinois Fighting Illini	Penn State Nittany Lions
(2–5)	(5–1)
20	18
Head coach: Bret Bielema	Head coach: James Franklin
	AP / Coaches; 7 / 8
	1	2	3	4	OT	2OT	3OT	4OT	5OT	6OT	7OT	8OT	9OT	Total
Illinois	0	7	0	3	3	3	0	0	0	0	0	2	2	20
Penn State	7	3	0	0	3	3	0	0	0	0	0	2	0	18
- Date: October 23, 2021
- Season: 2021
- Stadium: Beaver Stadium
- Location: University Park, Pennsylvania
- Favorite: Penn State by 24.5
- Referee: Reggie Smith
- Attendance: 105,001

United States TV coverage
- Network: ABC
- Announcers: Bob Wischusen (play-by-play); Dan Orlovsky (analyst); Kris Budden (sideline)

The 2021 Illinois vs. Penn State football game was a regular-season college football game played on October 23, 2021, at Beaver Stadium in University Park, Pennsylvania. The Big Ten Conference matchup featured the Illinois Fighting Illini and the seventh-ranked Penn State Nittany Lions, and took place during week eight of the 2021 FBS football season. The game was scheduled as a 12:00 p.m. EDT kickoff, and broadcast by ABC. Illinois defeated Penn State, 20–18, to win the contest after a record nine overtimes.

The two teams entered the game on quite different trajectories. Illinois, led by first-year head coach Bret Bielema, came into the game with a 2–5 record; after a season-opening win against Nebraska, they entered a four-game skid which ended with a defeat of Charlotte, and they arrived in Happy Valley following a shutout loss against Wisconsin followed by a bye week. Penn State, meanwhile, began their season with five straight wins, with two coming over ranked teams – No. 12 Wisconsin and No. 22 Auburn. Led by eighth-year head coach James Franklin, the Nittany Lions entered the game coming off of a bye week as well, with their lone loss (at No. 3 Iowa) coming the week prior.

The game was low-scoring throughout, with the predicted over–under set at 46.5 points. The game's first points came with nine seconds to play in the opening quarter, with Sean Clifford finding KeAndre Lambert-Smith for a long touchdown pass. The Nittany Lions scored a field goal to increase their lead to ten early in the second quarter, with Illinois responding by way of an eight-minute touchdown drive, narrowing Penn State's lead to three at halftime. The third quarter passed with no scoring, as both teams missed a field goal attempt, and a 37-yard Illinois field goal on their opening drive of the fourth quarter tied the game at ten. Both teams traded field goals in the first and second overtimes; the third overtime began an alternating series of two-point conversions in lieu of drives beginning at the 25-yard-line (as per newly instituted rules by the NCAA, which moved mandatory conversion attempts from the fifth overtime to the third overtime). Each team failed their conversions in each of the third through seventh overtimes, with both teams converting in the eighth. Illinois converted in the ninth overtime after Penn State failed in their attempt, giving Illinois a two-point victory.

== Teams ==
This conference game, which took place during week eight of the 2021 NCAA Division I FBS football season, pitted the Illinois Fighting Illini against the No. 7 Penn State Nittany Lions. As members of opposite divisions of the Big Ten Conference (Penn State in the East and Illinois in the West), the teams have not played annually since 2015. Penn State entered the game with a 20–5 lead in the series. Since Illinois's last win, in 2014, Penn State had been dominant, recording wins of 39–0 in 2015, 63–24 in 2018, and 56–21 in 2020.

=== Illinois ===
The Illinois Fighting Illini, under the leadership of first-year head coach Bret Bielema, entered the contest with a record of 2–5, and 1–3 in conference play. They opened their season with a 30–22 upset victory over Nebraska in the Aer Lingus College Football Classic, played during Week 0; this win marked Illinois's first back-to-back wins against Nebraska since 1923 and 1924. The following week, the Fighting Illini dropped a home game to UTSA, 30–37, and then fell 14–42 in their first road game against Virginia. The skid continued for the Illini; their next game, against Maryland, ended in a 17–20 defeat after the Terrapins converted a field goal as time expired. The following week, Illinois was dealt another one-possession loss, this time by a score of 9–13 at Purdue. Bielema's squad returned to winning ways with a 24–14 home victory against Charlotte before being shut out 0–24 by Wisconsin on homecoming. They entered the matchup with Penn State, the first ranked opponent on their schedule, coming off of a bye week.

=== Penn State ===
Led by eighth-year head coach James Franklin, the Penn State Nittany Lions entered the contest with a 5–1 overall record and a 2–1 mark in conference play. Ranked No. 19 in the preseason poll, they opened their season with a conference win, like Illinois, as they defeated No. 12 Wisconsin on the road, 16–10. They easily defeated Ball State 44–13 in their home opener, moving to No. 10 in the polls in time for their week three matchup against No. 22 Auburn. In a contest visited by College GameDay, the Nittany Lions defeated the Tigers by a score of 28–20 to move to 3–0. A 38–17 win against FCS-ranked Villanova followed, and Penn State, ranked No. 4, then shut out Indiana at home, 24–0, improving their record to 5–0 and setting up a top-four matchup the next week at No. 3 Iowa. The Nittany Lions suffered their first loss against the Hawkeyes, falling 20–23 in Iowa City. They led into the game against Illinois with a bye week as well, and were ranked in both major polls – No. 7 in the AP Poll and No. 8 in the Coaches Poll – entering the game.

== Game summary ==
=== Pre-game ===
Entering the game, Penn State was widely expected to win with relative ease, with the Nittany Lions favored to win by 24 points. Previews of the game praised Penn State's rush defense and cited Illinois's lack of depth and a clear starting quarterback as potential liabilities. Penn State lacked a straightforward quarterback situation as well; starter Sean Clifford had sustained an injury in the team's previous game against Iowa, and it was unknown if he was going to be able to play after practicing during the bye week while wearing a knee brace.

=== First half ===
Scheduled for a noon start, the game kicked off on ABC at 12:06 p.m. EDT, as Jordan Stout's opening kick resulted in a touchback. Starting on their own 25-yard-line, Illinois's opening drive lasted only three plays before an interception by Curtis Jacobs gave the Nittany Lions the ball on the Penn State 32-yard-line. The opening quarter saw little offensive productivity afterwards; each team traded punts twice, though only one of the four drives was a three-and-out. The quarter's last full drive was one that began on Penn State's own 7-yard-line, as the Nittany Lions offense drove the ball to the Illinois 42-yard-line before Sean Clifford completed a deep pass to KeAndre Lambert-Smith for a touchdown, opening the game's scoring and giving Penn State a 7–0 lead with nine seconds to play in the quarter.

Beginning the second quarter, Illinois's ensuing drive resulted in their second turnover after Artur Sitkowski fumbled while being sacked; the loose ball was recovered by Dvon Ellies on the Illinois 40-yard-line. Penn State capitalized, adding to their lead with a 35-yard field goal that finished a six-play drive. Illinois responded quickly, capping an eight-plus minute drive with a one-yard touchdown rush by Chase Brown, narrowing the Penn State lead to three. As in the first quarter, both offenses stalled after that, as Penn State punted twice and Illinois punted once before Illinois ran one play to end the half. Penn State led at halftime, 10–7.

=== Second half ===
The second half started with both defenses playing effectively. Illinois's defense forced a Penn State punt on the opening drive of the third quarter, giving their offense the ball on their own 12-yard-line, and Penn State's defense responded by forcing a fumble on the fifth play of the ensuing Illini drive. This set the Nittany Lions offense up with possession on the Illinois 22-yard-line, in prime position to score and increase their lead. This did not happen, however, as Penn State was unable to move the ball and ended up missing a 40-yard field goal, giving possession back to Illinois. Unlike Penn State, Illinois was able to move the ball downfield, gaining 46 yards on six plays, but they too ended the drive with a missed field goal attempt, this time from 50 yards. Penn State received possession, but was forced to punt after an incompletion on third and ten; the punt was downed by the coverage team on the Illinois 10-yard-line. Illinois's ensuing drive was far more productive, as the Illini gained chunk yardage on several plays to begin the drive, putting them just outside the red zone at the conclusion of the third quarter.

The Illinois drive resumed at the beginning of the fourth quarter; they were within the red zone in one play – a three-yard Chase Brown rush – and tied the game via a 37-yard field goal on the drive's sixteenth play. Penn State regained possession with just under twelve minutes to play in the game, but was forced to punt after gaining a net total of three yards on five plays. Illinois was forced to punt on their ensuing drive after stalling just outside their own 40-yard-line, giving Penn State the ball with under five minutes to play on the Nittany Lions' 15-yard-line. Despite earning two first downs, Penn State was forced to punt the ball back to Illinois with just over half a minute remaining in the game. Illinois received possession on their own 8-yard-line, and was able to run five plays before time expired and the game went to overtime.

=== Overtimes ===
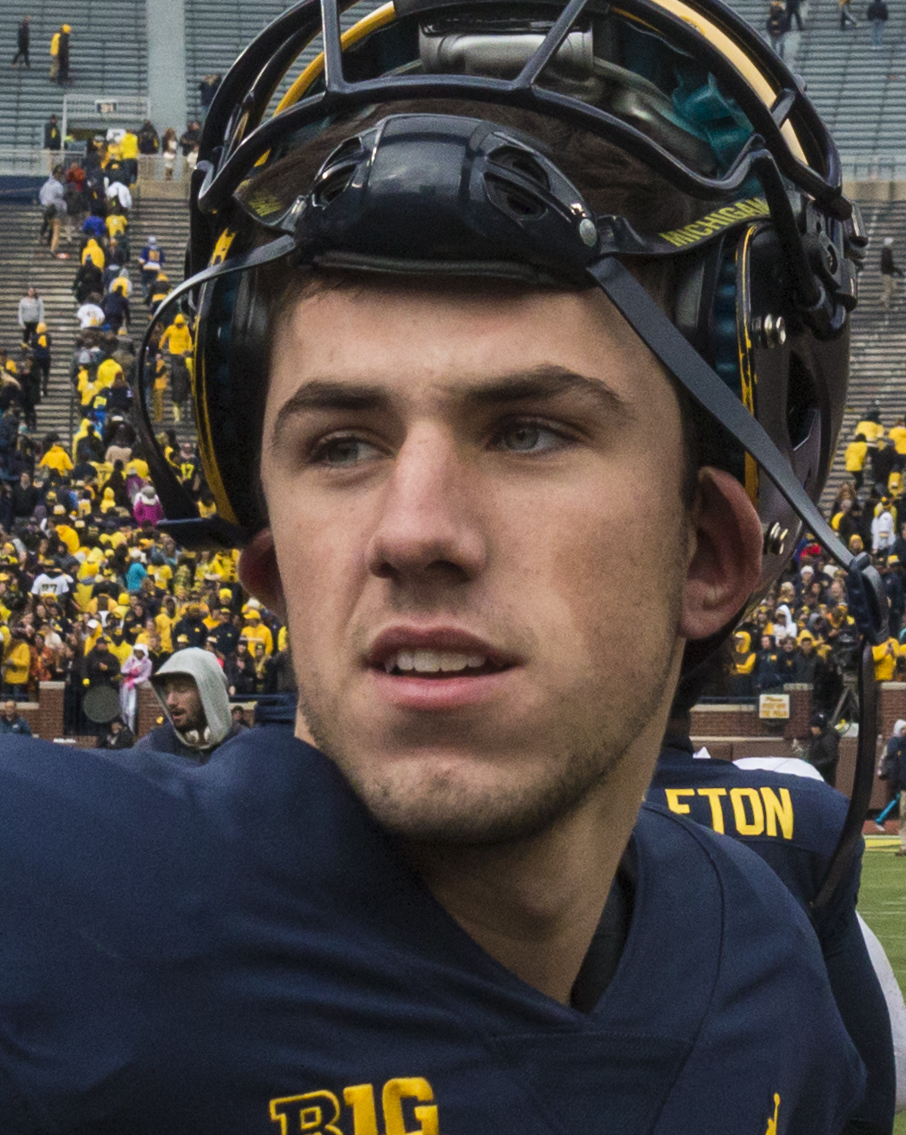
Illinois quarterback Brandon Peters threw the winning two-point pass in the ninth overtime.

Tied at ten points apiece, the game would be decided in overtime. After winning the coin toss, the visiting Illini elected to play defense first, and held Penn State to a 31-yard field goal try, which was successfully converted by Jordan Stout to put his team ahead by three. Unable to pick up a first down in overtime, Illinois tried a field goal as well, this one from 39 yards, which was made by James McCourt. In the game's second overtime period, the order in which the teams attempted drives was reversed. Illinois began, gaining 21 yards and driving to the Penn State 4-yard-line before kicking a 22-yard field goal on fourth and four. On the contrary, Penn State's offense was only able to advance the ball three yards before setting for another field goal of their own, made from 40 yards and tying the game once again at 16. Due to NCAA rules instituted prior to the 2021 season, the teams began alternating two-point conversion attempts, rather than drives from the 25-yard-line, starting in the third overtime; in previous years, these alternating two-point attempts would only begin once the game reached the fifth overtime.

Penn State failed in their initial two-point conversion, in the third overtime; they attempted a Philly Special trick play in which Tyler Lauren threw a pass back to quarterback Sean Clifford; however, the pass was underthrown and fell incomplete. This started a string of ten consecutive failed conversions for both teams combined, stretching from the third to the seventh overtimes. Despite playing with their backup quarterback after starter Artur Sitkowski was injured in the fourth overtime, Illinois broke the deadlock in the eighth overtime with a pass from Brandon Peters to Isaiah Williams. Penn State managed to respond, as Noah Cain found the end zone to tie the game back up at 18. Penn State's ninth-overtime conversion attempt was no good, after a pass intended for Parker Washington fell incomplete, and Illinois clinched the two-point victory with a successful pass from Peters to Casey Washington. The game lasted four hours and eleven minutes in total.

=== Scoring summary ===
2021 Illinois vs. Penn State football game

Quarter	1	2	3	4	OT	2OT	3OT	4OT	5OT	6OT	7OT	8OT	9OT	Total
Illinois	0	7	0	3	3	3	0	0	0	0	0	2	2	20
No. 7 Penn State	7	3	0	0	3	3	0	0	0	0	0	2	0	18

at Beaver Stadium • University Park, Pennsylvania

- Date: Saturday, October 23, 2021
- Game time: 12:00 p.m. EDT
- Game weather: Rain • Temperature: 48 °F (9 °C) • Wind: W 5 mph
- Game attendance: 105,001
- Referee: Reggie Smith
- TV announcers (ABC): Bob Wischusen (play-by-play), Dan Orlovsky (sideline), Kris Budden (sideline)

Scoring summary

Quarter	Time	Drive			Team	Scoring information	Score	
Quarter	Time	Plays	Yards	TOP	Team	Scoring information	Illinois	Penn State
1	0:09	4	93	1:55	Penn State	KeAndre Lambert-Smith 42-yard touchdown reception from Sean Clifford, Jordan Stout kick good	0	7
2	11:12	6	23	1:41	Penn State	35-yard field goal by Jordan Stout	0	10
2	2:52	15	75	8:20	Illinois	Chase Brown 1-yard touchdown run, James McCourt kick good	7	10
4	11:49	16	70	7:33	Illinois	37-yard field goal by James McCourt	10	10
OT		8	12		Penn State	31-yard field goal by Jordan Stout	10	13
OT		4	4		Illinois	39-yard field goal by James McCourt	13	13
2OT		7	21		Illinois	22-yard field goal by James McCourt	16	13
2OT		4	3		Penn State	40-yard field goal by Jordan Stout	16	16
8OT					Illinois	2-point pass good (Isaiah Williams pass from Brandon Peters)	18	16
8OT					Penn State	2-point run good (Noah Cain run)	18	18
9OT					Illinois	2-point pass good (Casey Washington pass from Brandon Peters)	20	18
"TOP" = time of possession. For other American football terms, see Glossary of American football.							20	18

== Statistics ==
Team statistical comparison
Statistic	Illinois	Penn State
First downs	27	14
First downs rushing	20	4
First downs passing	3	9
First downs penalty	4	1
Third down efficiency	9–18	4–17
Fourth down efficiency	0–0	1–1
Total plays–net yards	88–395	63–227
Rushing attempts–net yards	67–357	29–62
Yards per rush	5.3	2.1
Yards passing	38	165
Pass completions–attempts	8–21	19–34
Interceptions thrown	1	0
Punt returns–total yards	1–(−2)	0–0
Kickoff returns–total yards	0–0	0–0
Punts–total yardage	4–172	8–375
Fumbles–lost	3–2	1–0
Penalties–yards	4–50	7–81
Time of possession	36:25	23:35

Illinois statistics
Fighting Illini passing
	C–A	Yds	TD	INT
Artur Sitkowski	8–19	38	0	1
Casey Washington	0–2	0	0	0
Fighting Illini rushing
	Car	Yds	TD	Avg
Chase Brown	33	223	1	6.8
Joshua McCray	24	142	0	5.9
Fighting Illini receiving
	Rec	Yds	TD	Avg
Donny Navarro III	2	12	0	6.0
Daniel Barker	2	11	0	5.5
Isaiah Williams	2	7	0	3.5
Chase Brown	1	6	0	6.0
Jakari Norwood	1	2	0	2.0

Penn State statistics
Nittany Lions passing
	C–A	Yds	TD	INT
Sean Clifford	19–34	165	1	0
Nittany Lions rushing
	Car	Yds	TD	Avg
Noah Cain	11	43	0	3.9
Keyvone Lee	7	24	0	3.4
John Lovett	5	21	0	4.2
Tyler Warren	1	2	0	2.0
Nittany Lions receiving
	Rec	Yds	TD	Avg
Jahan Dotson	6	69	0	11.5
KeAndre Lambert-Smith	3	49	1	16.3
Brenton Strange	2	24	0	12.0
Parker Washington	4	17	0	4.3
Noah Cain	1	3	0	3.0
John Lovett	2	2	0	1.0
Theo Johnson	1	1	0	1.0

== Aftermath ==
The game was the sixth in NCAA history to reach at least seven overtimes, with the last coming in a 2018 seven-overtime game between LSU and Texas A&M. It was the first to surpass the seventh overtime, meaning it broke the record for the longest NCAA football game by number of overtimes upon entering its eighth overtime, and, as a result, was also the first NCAA football game to reach the ninth overtime. Additionally, it was the lowest-scoring of any seven-plus overtime game; it did not surpass the forecasted over–under total of 46.5 points, and it fell short of the 47 points totalled by North Texas and FIU in their 2006 seven-overtime game. The newly implemented overtime format drew criticism from some following the game's conclusion, since it was largely designed to limit the length of games and avoid injuries but proved unsuccessful at both. Some speculated that the game took longer than it would have under the previous format and Illinois starting quarterback Artur Sitkowski suffered an injury in the fourth overtime period. Saturday Down South called the game "awful" and was among several outlets calling for the NCAA to review the overtime rules.

Following the game, Illinois's record improved to 3–5, with their conference record improving to 2–3. Penn State fell to 5–2 with their second straight loss, and their conference record similarly fell to 2–2. The Nittany Lions dropped significantly in both polls; they fell from No. 7 to No. 20 in the AP Poll and from No. 8 to No. 17 in the Coaches Poll. In addition, this was the 100th career victory for Illinois head coach Bret Bielema; he was previously the head coach at Wisconsin and Arkansas.

Penn State would end up finishing the regular season with a record of 7–5; they were invited to the Outback Bowl, where they lost to Arkansas. Illinois finished the season 5–7 and were not invited to play in a bowl game.

== See also ==
- 2001 Arkansas vs. Ole Miss football game
- 2003 Arkansas vs. Kentucky football game
- 2018 LSU vs. Texas A&M football game
