= Overtime (sports) =

Tie-breaking method used in sports

Overtime (OT) or extra time (ET) is a tie-breaking method used in various sports. If the scores are equal after the regular period of play has ended, an additional period of play - the 'overtime' or 'extra time' period - is contested to determine the winner. In some sports, this extra period is played only if the game is required to have a clear winner, as in single-elimination tournaments where only one team or player can advance to the next round or win the tournament and replays are not allowed.

The rules of overtime or extra time vary between sports and even different competitions. Some may employ "sudden death", where the first player or team to score immediately wins the game. This rule is sometimes known as golden goal. In others, play continues until a specified time has elapsed, and only then is the winner declared. If the contest remains tied after the extra session, depending on the rules, the match may immediately end as a draw, additional periods may be played, or a different tie-breaking procedure, such as a penalty shootout may be used instead.

== Association football ==
=== Knock-out contests (including professional competition) ===
In association football knockout competitions or competition stages, teams play an extra 30 minutes, called extra time, when the deciding leg (or replay of a tie) has not produced a winner by the end of normal or full-time. (This is not to be confused with additional time, which is the part of normal time added to compensate for in-game stoppages.) Extra time follows a short break (traditionally five minutes) where players remain on or around the field of play and comprises two 15-minute periods, with teams changing ends in between. Although the Laws of the Game state that extra time is one of the approved methods to decide a winner, competitions are not bound to adopt extra time, and each competition is free to choose any method designated in the Laws of the Game to decide a winner.

In a one-off tie or deciding replay, level scores nearly always go to extra time, but this applies only to FIFA competitions and first-tier continental national team competitions. In games played over two legs at the continental levels (such as the three–tier men's continental club competitions and the women's continental club competitions), domestic levels (such as Copa del Rey, DFB-Pokal and the Coppa Italia semi-finals or Bundesliga relegation and promotion play-offs) or even at lower levels (such as the English Football League play-offs), teams play extra time only in the second leg where the aggregate score – then normally followed by an away-goals rule – has not produced a winner first. However starting the 2021–22 season, UEFA abolished it for all club competitions and replaced it with the penalty shootout if the aggregate is still tied after extra time. Ties in the FA Cup used to be decided by as many replays as necessary until one produced a winner within normal time rather than have any extra time or shootouts though, nowadays, replays are limited to just one, with the game going to extra time if teams are still level. Equally, CONMEBOL has historically never used extra time in any of the competitions it directly organizes except only in the final match of a competition, such as the Copa Libertadores and Copa Sudamericana. The score in games or ties resorting to extra time are often recorded with the abbreviation a.e.t. (after extra time) usually accompanying the earlier score after regulation time. The two-legged format for club competition finals with this rule is still used in CONCACAF club competitions, where an away-goals rule still takes precedence.

Ties that are still without a winner after extra time are usually broken by kicks from the penalty spot, commonly called a penalty shoot-out. In the late 1990s and early 2000s, many international matches tried to reduce this by employing the golden goal (also called "sudden death") or silver goal rules (the game ending if a team has the lead after the first 15-minute period of extra time), but competitions have not retained these. The abbreviation a.s.d.e.t. refers to a result "after sudden death extra time".

=== American collegiate rules ===
Up until 2021, under NCAA college soccer rules, all games that remained tied after 90 minutes had an overtime period. A sudden-death golden goal rule was applied, with the game ending as soon as an overtime goal was scored. If neither team scored in the two 10-minute halves, the game ended in a draw unless it was a conference or national championship tournament game. A playoff game tied after two overtime periods then moved to a penalty kick shoot-out with the winner determined by the teams alternating kicks from the penalty mark.

Since the 2022 men's and women's season, the golden goal has been abolished during the regular season. Since 2024, games that ended in a draw during a conference or national tournament game involve two 10-minute periods, with golden goal. A playoff game tied after two overtime periods still moves to a penalty kick shoot-out with the winner determined by the teams alternating kicks from the penalty mark.

=== American high school rules ===
High school rules vary depending on the state and conference, but most will have a sudden-death overtime procedure wherein the game ends upon scoring a golden goal, although in some instances the overtime will go until completion with the team in the lead after time expires (i.e., silver goal rules) declared the winner. The overtime period length may vary, but it is commonly 10 minutes long. Depending on the state, if the game is still tied at the end of the first overtime:

- As many additional overtime periods – golden or silver goal rules – may be played as needed to determine a winner.
- After one or more overtime periods result in the score remaining tied, a shootout procedure may be played. In a shootout, the coaches or team captains select five players to shoot penalty kicks with teams alternating kicks from the penalty mark in an attempt to put the ball into the net. The procedure continues until each team has taken five kicks, or, if one side has scored more successful kicks, the other could not possibly reach with its remaining kicks.
- If both teams make the same number of successful penalty kicks after all eligible players have taken their first kick, the procedure repeats; the teams are not required to follow the same order of kickers as was used for the first kick, and may replace one or more of the original kickers. The procedure repeats until one side has successfully converted more penalty kicks in a set of five attempts.
- Depending on the state or conference, the game may go directly to a penalty shootout rather than playing overtime.
- Under rules published by the NFHS, a section called "Sample Tie-Breaking Procedure" is included, but state associations are not required to adopt those procedures.

== American and Canadian football ==
=== National Football League ===
In the National Football League (NFL), sudden death overtime periods are played during regular-season and postseason games, but not during preseason games from 1920 to 1973 and since 2021. Regular-season games end in a tie if the score is still tied after one 10-minute overtime period, while in postseason games, 15-minute overtime periods are played until a winner is determined.

==== Procedure ====
At the start of overtime, the team captains and officials hold another coin toss. Similarly to the coin toss at the beginning of the game, the team that wins the coin toss chooses whether they want to receive or kick the opening kickoff, while the other team chooses which end of the field they will defend. Gameplay is conducted similarly to the regulation periods (in contrast with the "Kansas system" used in college football rules), and each team is given two timeouts. Instant replay reviews must be initiated by the replay official, i.e. there are no challenges.

The winner is then decided as follows:

- Each team gets at least one possession in overtime regardless of the result of the opening drive.
- The team with the most points after each team has had an opportunity to possess the ball wins the game.
- If the team that receives the opening kickoff does not score on its opening drive, or if the score is still tied after each team has had an opportunity to possess the ball, the next team to score wins the game.
- Any score by the defense (e.g., safety, or a fumble or an interception that is returned for a touchdown) results in a win for that team.
- The game ends in a tie if the score is still tied at the end of the 10-minute overtime period.

Because playoff games cannot end in a tie, the overtime procedure is modified for these games:

- Each team gets three timeouts instead of two.
- Each team is guaranteed one possession regardless of the result of the opening drive.
- Overtime periods are 15 minutes instead of 10.
- If the score is still tied at the end of the first overtime period, or if the second team to possess the ball has not completed their initial possession at that point, additional 15-minute overtime periods are played until a winner is determined.
- If more than one overtime period is needed:
  - There is a two-minute intermission between overtime periods.
  - Second and fourth-quarter timing rules apply during the second overtime period.
  - The rules stipulate that there is no halftime break after the second overtime period and provide for another coin toss at the end of every fourth overtime period; however, no playoff game to date has extended into a third overtime.

==== History ====
The National Football League (NFL) introduced sudden-death overtime for any divisional tiebreak games beginning in 1940, and for championship games beginning in 1946. The first postseason game to be played under these rules was the 1958 NFL Championship Game between the Baltimore Colts and New York Giants (the "Greatest Game Ever Played").

In 1974, the NFL adopted sudden-death overtime for regular season and preseason games: if the score is tied after regulation time, one additional period is played.

Until the 2016 season, the period was 15 minutes in all games: in 2017, it was changed to 10 minutes in regular season games, while overtime in preseason games was abolished in 2021, and it remains 15 minutes for playoff games.

In March 2010, NFL owners voted to amend overtime rules for postseason games; the changes were extended to the regular season in 2012.

Since no 2010 postseason game went into overtime, the first overtime game played after the implementation of this rule came in the wild-card round in 2011. Incidentally, this was also the shortest overtime in NFL history until 2019; Pittsburgh Steelers kicker Shaun Suisham kicked off and the ball went out of the back of the end zone, resulting in a touchback and no time off the clock. Tim Tebow, then with the Denver Broncos, threw an 80-yard touchdown pass on the first play to Demaryius Thomas to give the Broncos the win in only 11 seconds.

The first time the "first-possession field goal" rule was enforced occurred on 9 September 2012, the first week of the season, in a game between the Minnesota Vikings and Jacksonville Jaguars. Minnesota's Blair Walsh kicked a 38-yard field goal on the Vikings' first drive. When Jacksonville regained possession, they failed to gain a first down, losing possession and the game on a failed fourth-down conversion.

The first overtime in which both teams scored occurred on 18 November 2012, in a game between the Houston Texans and Jacksonville Jaguars; the Texans won 43–37. The first overtime game that ended in a tie after both teams scored in overtime occurred on 24 November 2013, when the Minnesota Vikings and Green Bay Packers played to a 26–all tie.

On 5 February 2017, a Super Bowl went into overtime for the first time, with the New England Patriots defeating the Atlanta Falcons, 34–28; the Patriots scored a touchdown on their initial possession, so the Falcons never received the ball in overtime.

On 29 December 2019, in their season finale against the Tampa Bay Buccaneers, the Falcons finished the game with a pick-six seven seconds into overtime by Deion Jones, breaking the record for the shortest overtime in NFL history.

A 2022 rule change gives both teams one possession to start the first overtime in playoff games, no matter whether or not a touchdown is scored first; the changes were extended to the regular season in 2025. The first game to go into overtime under this rule was Super Bowl LVIII following the 2023 season. However, that game was not impacted by the rule change; the San Francisco 49ers kicked a field goal on their first possession and the Kansas City Chiefs, who ultimately scored a walk-off touchdown on their possession, would have gotten a possession under the pre-2022 rule as well.

=== Other professional football leagues ===
The Arena Football League and NFL Europe used a variant in which each team was guaranteed a possession. Whoever was leading after one possession won the game; if the teams remain tied after one possession, the game went to sudden death. This procedure was used by the second United Football League in its inaugural 2009 season. This included both games of all semifinals series. All overtime periods thereafter were true sudden death periods. Today just Arena Football One uses this.

The short-lived World Football League, for its inaugural 1974 season (the same year the NFL established sudden death in the regular season), used a fifteen-minute quarter of extra time, divided into two halves. It was not sudden death.

The New York Pro Football League, a 1910s-era league that eventually had several of its teams join the NFL, used replays to settle ties in its playoff tournament. A replay was used in the 1919 tournament to decide the championship between the Buffalo Prospects and the Rochester Jeffersons. The teams had played to a tie on Thanksgiving; Buffalo won the replay 20–0 to win the championship.

The current United Football League settles ties by three rounds of two-point conversions attempts from the five-yard line. A coin toss is called by the visiting team; the winner of the toss chooses to possess the ball first or defend. Whoever scores the most points after three rounds wins; otherwise, teams play sudden-death rounds until one team scores. One timeout can be called per overtime round.

=== College, high school, and Canadian football ===
In college (since the 1996 season) and high school football, as well as the Canadian Football League (since the 2000 season) and the short-lived Alliance of American Football, an overtime procedure is used to determine the winner. This method is sometimes referred to as a "Kansas Playoff", or "Kansas Plan" because of its origins for high school football in that state. A brief summary of the rules:

- A coin toss determines which side attempts to score first, and at which end zone the scores are attempted.
- Each team in turn receives one possession, starting with first-and-10 from a fixed point on the opponent's side of the field:
  - Under NCAA rules, the first possession of overtime begins at the opponent's 25-yard line. When overtime was introduced, all possessions for each team started at that point, but the procedure for subsequent overtimes has changed twice since 2019.
    - In 2019 and 2020, the first four possessions for each team (if necessary) started at the opponent's 25. All subsequent possessions were two-point conversion attempts taken from the 3-yard line, the standard starting point for that play under NCAA rules, and were scored as conversions.
    - Since 2021, the first two possessions for each team start at the opponent's 25. All subsequent possessions are two-point conversion attempts.
  - Under standard high school football rules, the possession begins at the 10-yard line, and all plays are goal-to-go. However, the high school rulebook only recommends the overtime procedure and allows state associations to use their own; the 15-, 20-, and 25-yard lines are variously used. The AAF also used the 10-yard line as its starting point.
  - In the CFL, where a single point can be scored on a punt, the possession begins at the 35-yard line.
- The play clock runs as normal. There is no game clock, and all play is otherwise untimed.
- A team's possession ends when it (or the defense) scores, misses a field goal, or turns over the ball (either on downs or by the defense otherwise gaining possession).
- In high school, college and the CFL, a field goal can be kicked at any time. Thus, if the first team fails to score, the opponent, already usually in field goal range, can end the game by kicking one (in the CFL, as previously noted, one can do the same with a single). In the AAF, no field goals were allowed at any time during the playoff.
- As usual, a touchdown by the offense is followed by a try for one or two points. In NCAA football, since 2021, teams must attempt a two-point conversion after a touchdown in double overtime; all overtime procedures thereafter consist of two-point conversion attempts and are scored as such. Since 2010, CFL teams must also attempt the two-point conversion after any touchdown in overtime. The AAF required two-point conversions after any touchdown.
- In college football, the defense may score a touchdown on a play on which it gains possession by turnover; such a play will satisfy the condition of each team having a possession and will therefore end the game. In high school football, the defense is generally not allowed to score if it gains possession, although the Oregon School Activities Association adopted the college rule experimentally in 2005, and the two main high school governing bodies in Texas, the University Interscholastic League and Texas Association of Private and Parochial Schools, use NCAA football rules (as did Massachusetts through the 2018 season, after which it adopted standard high school rules). If scoring is not allowed or the turnover play does not end with a score, regardless of the eventual position of the ball at the end of the play, the team assumes offense and will begin their procedure from the specified position on the field.
- Each team receives one charged time-out per offensive or defensive series (except in the CFL, and as of 2025, NCAA football limits teams to one timeout to use beginning with triple overtime until the game is concluded).
- If the score remains tied at the end of the first overtime period, the procedure is repeated. The team with the second possession in one overtime will have the first possession in the next overtime.
- Before 2026, the CFL limited overtime procedures to two in regular-season games; if the scores were still level, the game was a tie. Starting in 2026, if a regular-season game is tied after two procedures, the teams alternate two-point conversion attempts from the 3-yard line until a winner is determined. In CFL playoff games, full overtime periods continue until a winner is determined. The AAF did the same, except that regular-season games ended after only one overtime procedure, regardless of the score. (The AAF folded before it ever played any playoff games.)
- In American college and high school football, the overtime periods are continued until a winner is determined.
- All points scored in overtime count as if they were scored in regulation. (This is in contrast to the analogous penalty shootout used in other sports, where shootout points are counted separately and only one point is awarded to the winner (or the match is recorded as a draw, as is done for association football matches under IFAB laws); however, this procedure is like extra innings in baseball.)

==== Record and notable overtime games ====
On two occasions, just two plays were required to determine an overtime winner in an NCAA football game: on 26 September 2002, when Louisville defeated Florida State 26–20 and on 27 September 2003, when Georgia Tech defeated Vanderbilt 24–17.

It is possible for a college game to end after a single play in overtime if the team on defense secures a turnover and returns it for a touchdown: on 9 September 2005, Ohio defeated Pittsburgh 16–10 on an 85-yard interception return by Dion Byrum on the third play of overtime. It is also possible for the defense to get a safety on the first play of overtime (which would also end the game), but this would require the offense to lose 75 yards on the play, which is extremely unlikely (such a scenario is attested in regular play from scrimmage in college football but never in an overtime period).

As of the beginning of the 2024 season, the Tennessee Volunteers have competed in the most overtime college football games, going 15–8 across the 23 games.

The college game with the most overtime periods was on 23 October 2021, when Illinois defeated Penn State, 20–18, in nine overtime periods. Prior to that, five games had been decided in seven overtime periods: Arkansas vs. Ole Miss in 2001, Arkansas vs. Kentucky in 2003, North Texas vs. FIU in 2006, Western Michigan vs. Buffalo in 2017, and LSU vs. Texas A&M in 2018, the latter of which was the impetus for the 2019 rule change which mandated two-point conversion attempts after a set number of overtime periods. In 2024, Georgia defeated Georgia Tech 44–42 in eight overtime periods, the second-longest NCAA game up to that point.

The most overtimes required to decide a bowl game in Football Bowl Subdivision (FBS) history is six, which occurred in the 2024 GameAbove Sports Bowl.

==== Overtime formats ====
The Kansas System was first implemented in 1971. The original Kansas System had each team start on the 10-yard line. Throughout the state that first year, 70 games went into overtime with one game requiring five overtime periods to determine a winner. After the system was reviewed positively by the majority of state's coaches and administrators, Kansas State High School Activities Association leadership presented the system to the National Federation of State High School Associations, who approved giving state associations the option of using the overtime system for two years. Two years later the overtime system became a permanent option for state associations use.

Another type of overtime system was once used by the California Interscholastic Federation. Known as the "California tiebreaker", it was used in high school football from 1968 through the 1970s and 1980s. The California tiebreaker starts with the ball placed at the 50-yard line, and the teams run four plays each (a coin toss decides who gets to go first), alternating possession at the spot of the ball after every play. If no one manages to score (field goals are not allowed), then the team that is in its opponents' territory at the conclusion of the eight plays is awarded one point and declared the winner. When the California tiebreaker was finally phased out, it was replaced by the Kansas tiebreaker.

The Louisiana High School Athletic Association did not adopt the Kansas tiebreaker for its playoffs until 1977, as did Texas per the University Interscholastic League and Texas Association of Private and Parochial Schools through 1995.

Prior to this, for Louisiana, if a game ended tied, the team with the most first downs was declared the winner; if that was tied, the next criterion was penetrations inside the opponents' 20-yard line. On at least two occasions, both of those criteria were even following a drawn match, forcing a replay.

As for Texas, tiebreakers were as follows: first, most penetrations on or inside opponents' 20; second, first downs; third, total yardage; and a coin toss if all of those failed. If a TAPPS/UIL state championship game ended tied prior to 1996, both teams were declared co-champions, as happened in the 1984 AAAAA final between Odessa Permian and Beaumont French at Texas Stadium in Irving.

== Basketball ==
In basketball, if the score is tied at the end of regulation play, the teams play multiple five-minute overtime periods until a winner is decided. In levels below collegiate/Olympic play, an overtime period is half the length of a standard quarter, i.e., four minutes for high school varsity. The alternating possession rule is used to start all overtime periods under international rules for full-court basketball, while a jump ball is used under high school and NCAA rules, with the arrow reset based on the results of the jump ball to start each overtime. The Women's National Basketball Association, which uses a quarter-possession rule to start periods after the opening jump, also uses a jump ball. The entire overtime period is played; there is no sudden-death provision. All counts of personal fouls against players are carried over for the purpose of disqualifying players. If the score remains tied after an overtime period, this procedure is repeated until a winner is determined.

As many as six overtime periods have been necessary to determine a winner in an NBA game. Due to the rules allowing for multiple instances of overtime periods to be played until the game is decided, a game that needed two overtime periods to finish is said to have needed "double overtime", three overtime periods as "triple overtime", and so on.

In exhibition games (non-competitive play), it is upon the discretion of the coaches and organizers if an overtime is to be played especially if it is a non-tournament game (a one-off event).

Starting in the 2009–10 season, Euroleague Basketball, the organizer of the EuroLeague and EuroCup, introduced a new rule for two-legged ties that eliminated overtime unless necessary to break a tie on aggregate. The rule was first used in the 2009–10 EuroCup quarterfinals (which consist of two-legged ties), although no game in that phase of the competition ended in a regulation draw. Euroleague Basketball extended this rule to all two-legged ties in its competitions, including the EuroLeague, in 2010–11. One game in the qualifying rounds of that season (the only phase of the EuroLeague that uses two-legged ties), specifically the second leg of the third qualifying round tie between Spirou Charleroi and ALBA Berlin, ended in a draw after regulation. No overtime was played in that game because Spirou had won the first leg, and the two-legged tie. Although other competitions use two-legged ties at various stages, the FIBA Europe competitions are the only ones known to use overtime only if the aggregate score after the second game is tied.

A rule change in the FIBA rules effective 1 October 2017 (Article D.4.2) permits drawn games at the end of either leg of the two-legged tie. The definition states, "If the score is tied at the end of the first game, no extra period shall be played."

In The Basketball Tournament, a 64-team single-elimination tournament held each summer in the U.S., no overtime is played since 2018. Games employ the "Elam Ending", named after its creator, Ball State University professor Nick Elam, with the idea of making sure the game always ends on a basket. Upon the first dead ball (time-out, foul, violation) with 4 minutes or less remaining in the fourth period, the game clock is turned off (though the shot clock remains active). A target score is set at the current lead score plus eight points (originally seven, but changed for the 2019 edition), and the first team to reach or surpass the target wins. The NBA All-Star Game had used the Elam Ending from 2020 to 2023. The fourth period had no game clock, but the shot clock was active. Instead, a target score is set at the leading score after three periods plus 24 points; the first team to reach or exceed that score by any legal basket (field goal, three-pointer, or free throw) wins the game. The Canadian Elite Basketball League first used the Elam Ending in a 2020 tournament that replaced the season that was scrapped due to COVID-19, using TBT rules except that the target score was set by adding 9 points instead of 8. The CEBL made this permanent starting with its 2021 season.

Starting in 2022–23, the NBA G League adopted a variation of the Elam Ending in regular-season games, calling it the "Final Target Score". Instead of replacing overtime, the G League is using the Elam Ending as its overtime format. In this implementation, the target score is set by adding 7 points to the tied teams' score. The teams then play with a shot clock but no game clock, with the game ending once the target score is reached or exceeded. For the G League Winter Showcase, an event held in December in Las Vegas that sees all 30 teams play two games, the Elam Ending is implemented in the same manner as in the NBA All-Star Game, except the target score is the leading score plus 25 (instead of 24).

Unrivaled, a professional women's league that plays 3-on-3 basketball on a truncated full court, adopted the Elam Ending for its inaugural season in 2025. In its implementation, which it calls "winning score", the target score is set at the end of the third quarter, with 11 points added to the score of the leading team (or tied teams). Similar to other leagues' implementations of this concept, the fourth quarter is untimed with an active shot clock, and the first team to reach or exceed the target score wins.

In 3x3 basketball, a formalized version of the half-court three-on-three game, ties after a 10-minute game are settled by continuing play with no game clock (only the shot clock) until one team scores two additional points: baskets made outside the arc being worth two points and all others being worth one point. The 21-point rule, under which a regulation game ends once either team has reached 21 points, does not apply during overtime; a tie at 20 must go to 22. The team that did not get first possession in the game gets first possession in overtime (as jump balls are not used in 3x3). Individual personal foul counts are not kept at any time during the game; all personal fouls are recorded against the team, and team fouls carry over to overtime.

== Ice hockey ==
Ties are common in ice hockey due to the game's low-scoring nature. If the score is tied at the end of regulation play, certain leagues play overtime.

- NHL/PWHL(regular season): If a game is tied after regulation time (three 20-minute periods), the teams play in a sudden-death five-minute overtime period, with a goaltender and three skaters per side (as opposed to the standard five). If regulation time ends while a power play is in progress, the team with the advantage starts overtime with more than three skaters (four, or rarely five), and maintains its advantage for the duration of the penalty. Similarly, if a penalty is called in overtime, the player is removed from the ice (or one of the skaters if the penalized player is the goaltender), but can be replaced, while the non-penalized team receives an extra skater for the duration of the penalty. If nobody scores in the overtime period, the teams engage in a penalty shootout where three skaters, selected by the head coaches, go one-on-one against the opposing goaltender, taking the puck at center ice for a penalty shot. If the shootout remains tied after the initial three rounds, additional rounds are played until there is a winner; no player may participate in a shootout twice unless the entire active roster (excluding the backup goaltender) has been exhausted. The greatest number of shooters in a single shootout was 40 during a game between the Florida Panthers and Washington Capitals. Panthers player Nick Bjugstad gave Florida a 2–1 victory on a trick move.
  The 5-minute overtime period was introduced for regular season games beginning with the 1983–84 NHL season, but with teams at full strength on the ice. Overtime in the regular season was reduced to four skaters a side starting in the 2000-2001 season. The shootout was introduced for the 2005–06 NHL regular season, thus abolishing tie games. Previously, ties during the regular season were allowed to stand if not resolved in overtime. Starting in the 2015–16 season, overtime was reduced to three skaters a side.
- NHL/PWHL (postseason and all tiebreaker games): Following an intermission, multiple full 20-minute periods are played. Teams remain at full strength unless this is affected by penalties. A goal ends the game in sudden death; if neither team scores, this procedure is repeated after the intermission. The teams change ends after each period. This has made for lengthy games, with some going as far as five or six overtimes before the deciding goal is scored.
- NCAA (regular season): Effective with the 2020–21 season, all regular-season men's and women's games that are tied at the end of regulation use the NHL regular-season overtime procedure (5 minutes, sudden death, three skaters per side unless affected by penalties). Ties at the end of regulation stand in nonconference games; conferences may (but are not required to) use the NHL penalty shootout for league games. The so-called "spin-o-rama" move, in which the shooter completes a 360-degree turn with the puck, is banned in NCAA shootouts as of 2020–21. Previously, the teams played the 5-minute overtime at full strength (unless affected by penalties), and all games tied at the end of regulation ended in a tie.
- NCAA (in-season tournaments): For tournaments held during the season (such as the Beanpot and Great Lakes Invitational), in which advancement or determination of a champion is necessary, the new regular-season overtime procedure is used, followed by the NHL shootout procedure. Before 2020–21, organizers had the option of either using the postseason overtime procedure or using the regular-season procedure followed by a shootout. Statistics from a shootout are not counted by the NCAA, and a game decided by a shootout is considered a tie for NCAA tournament selection purposes.
- NCAA (postseason): Same as the NHL postseason overtime procedure above. Games decided in overtime are considered wins or losses rather than ties, regardless of how many overtimes are played.
- International (round robin): As of the 2007 IIHF World Championship, the IIHF instituted the "three-point rule", which not only awarded the winning team three points for a regulation win, but awarded them two points for a win in a 5-minute overtime period or a game-winning shot (shootout). Games in IIHF round robins can therefore no longer end in a tie. In the 2004 World Cup of Hockey, the NHL's tiebreaking procedure at the time was followed: there was a five-minute sudden-death period at four skaters per side, and if the score remained tied after the overtime period, it stood as a tie. The game between Sweden and Finland ended in a 4–4 tie after 65 minutes. The 2016 World Cup of Hockey had the new NHL/PWHL tiebreaking procedures: in round-robin play, 5-minute sudden-death period with three skaters per side, plus best-of-3-round shootouts and extra rounds if needed.
- International (medal rounds): Various tiebreaking procedures have been used for international tournaments, with all of them save one (World Cup of Hockey 2004) following a common theme: one period varying in length of sudden-death overtime followed by a shootout of five skaters (since 2010, 3) per side (as opposed to the NHL's three skaters per side originally; it also differs in that if the shootout does not resolve the tie, the same five skaters [now 3] then shoot again). The length of the overtime period has varied between 5, 10, and 20 minutes, and 5-on-5 and 4-on-4 formats have been used. The most recent format used was at the 2010 Olympics (particularly in the gold medal game); there were 20 minutes of 4-on-4 followed by a shootout. In 2006, it was 20 minutes of 5-on-5. All men's games ended in regulation during the medal rounds, while the women's semifinal between the United States and Sweden required a shootout to determine the winner. At the World Cup of Hockey in 2004, the NHL's postseason tiebreaking procedure was used (multiple 20-minute periods of 5-on-5 until a goal is scored). The only overtime game in the playoff round was the semifinal between the Czech Republic and Canada. Canada won 4–3 with a goal at 2:16 of overtime. The 2016 World Cup of Hockey had the same overtime procedure as the 2004 event. Since 2019, the gold medal game for the World Championships and Olympics uses multiple 20-minute 3-on-3 periods until one team scores, which wins the game.

== Handball ==
When a tie needs to be broken in handball, two straight 5-minute overtimes are played. If the teams are still tied after that, this overtime procedure is repeated once more; a further draw will result in a penalty shootout.

== Baseball and softball ==
Baseball and softball are unique among the popular North American team sports in that they do not use a game clock. However, if the regulation number of innings are complete (normally nine in baseball and seven in softball) and the score is even, extra innings are played to determine a winner. Complete innings are played, so if a team scores in the top half of the inning, the other team has the chance to play the bottom half of the inning; they will extend the game by tying the score again and win if they take the lead before their third out. The longest professional baseball game ever played, a 1981 minor league baseball game between the Pawtucket Red Sox and the Rochester Red Wings required 33 innings and over eight hours to complete. The Red Wings had scored in the top half of the 21st inning, but Pawtucket tied the game in the bottom half, extending the game.

Major League Baseball games normally end in a tie only if the game is called off due to weather conditions. In the early decades of baseball (up to the 1920s), a game could also be called off due to nightfall, but this ceased to be a problem once stadiums began installing lights in the 1930s. Two Major League Baseball All-Star Games have ended in a tie; the second 1961 game was called due to rain with the teams tied 1–1 after the ninth inning, and the 2002 game was called after the eleventh inning after both teams had exhausted their supply of pitchers. Since 2022, extra innings in All-Star games had been abolished, settling ties with a three-player, three-swing playoff (plus multiple triple-swing rounds if ties persist) after nine innings of regulation.

The exceptions to this are in Nippon Professional Baseball, Chinese Professional Baseball League, and the Korea Baseball Organization, where the game cannot go beyond 12 innings (in Japan Series, first 7 games only; no such limit thereafter). During the 2011 season the NPB had a game time limit of 3 1/2 hours during the regular season; ties are allowed to stand in the regular season and postseason ties are resolved in a full replay, extending a series if necessary. Extra innings are not played in KBO doubleheaders' first game.

In 2017, the Arizona League and Gulf Coast League served as testing grounds for the softball version of the World Baseball Softball Confederation extra-inning rule that places a runner on second base to start an extra inning of play. That rule also was followed by MLB as an experimental rule in 2020 and 2021, now a permanent rule for regular-season games.

== Cricket ==
Ties are allowed to stand in most forms of cricket (cf. Tied Test), but should a winner be necessary (such as in tournament settings), the most commonly used tiebreaking method is the Super Over, which is a limited extra session of the game wherein each team plays an additional six balls (together known as an over) to determine the winner. Tied Super Overs may be followed by another Super Over in some matches, such as (since 2008) the knockout matches of International Cricket Council tournaments. The Super Over originates from Twenty20 cricket, and has been used several times in Twenty20 International games; its first use in a One-Day International was the 2019 Cricket World Cup Final, wherein the Super Over was tied, and the winner then had to be determined by boundary countback (a statistical tiebreaker). Following this event, the ICC changed the rules of its knockout matches so that tied matches continue until one team wins a Super Over.

In the past, a bowlout was used in which bowlers attempted to hit an unguarded wicket. In an International Cricket Council tournament, it was used only once when India beat Pakistan 3–0 in the bowlout after scores were level in the group stage sending India to the Super 8 stage of the competition. In the ICC ODI World Cup 2019 Final, the score was decided by a super over with that being tied and England winning it 32–24 on boundary count.

== Rugby league ==
Rugby league games in some competitions are decided using overtime systems if scores are level at full-time (80 minutes). One extra time system is golden point, where any score (try, penalty goal, or field goal) by a team immediately wins the game. This entails a five-minute period of golden point time, after which the teams switch ends and a second five-minute period begins. Depending on the game's status, a scoreless extra time period ends the game as a draw, otherwise play continues until a winner is found.

== Rugby union ==
In the knockout stages of rugby competitions, most notably the Rugby World Cup, two full-length extra time periods of 10 minutes each are played (with an interval of 5 minutes in between) if the game is tied after full-time. If scores are level after 100 minutes, the rules call for a single sudden-death period of 10 minutes to be played. If the sudden-death extra time period results in no scoring, standard World Rugby rules call for a kicking competition to determine the winner. Domestic leagues may use other tiebreakers; for example, playoff games in the French professional leagues that are level at the end of extra time use a set of tiebreakers before going to a kicking competition, with the first tiebreaker being tries scored.

For Example: Exeter Chiefs and Montpellier played in the round of 16 in the European Rugby Champions Cup on 2 April 2023. The match ended 33–33 AET. Instead of a penalty kick shootout, it had a try count-back in which Exeter Chiefs had more tries.

In 2023, the Super Rugby competition introduced an extra-time system similar to that of the rugby league's National Rugby League (NRL) extra-time system called golden point. The guidelines state that a ten minute period will be played if both teams are tied on points scored at the conclusion of full-time, and includes injury time. A coin toss decides which team will kick-off (the opposite team being the receiver). Any team that scores during this ten minute period will be declared the winner. If the points scored between the two teams are still tied after the extra-time period, the match is declared a draw. The regulation published by the Super Rugby labels the system "Golden Point", however in 2025 the term was renamed to "Super Point" and was first featured in the round ten match (19 April 2025) between the Western Force and Hurricanes.

== Rugby sevens ==
In the sevens variant of rugby union, extra time is used only in knockout stages of competitions, such as the Rugby World Cup Sevens, Olympic Games and Commonwealth Games. It used to be the same for the World Rugby Sevens Series from the 1999–2000 season up to the 2022–23 season. From the 2023–24 season onwards it was added in pool stages as well. That change is only for the World Rugby Sevens Series. Extra time begins one minute after the end of full-time, and is played in multiple 5 minute periods. Unlike the 15-man game, extra time in sevens is true sudden-death, with the first score by either team winning the match. If neither team has scored at the end of a period, the teams change ends. This procedure is repeated until one team scores.

== Other sports ==
- In Australian rules football, drawn matches during a season remain as draws, with the premiership points being split two points apiece (excluding South Australian leagues, where it is split one point apiece).
  Extra time is generally played only in finals matches; for example, in the Australian Football League finals, if the scores are level when regular time has expired, two periods of three minutes (five minutes prior to 2020) each (plus time on) are played. If the scores remain level after the extra time has expired, this procedure is repeated until the winner is determined. In some competitions, there are no extra time periods and play simply continues under sudden death rules until the next score. The 2013 VFL reserves Grand Final was a notable match decided in this manner. A third period under golden point rules was implemented in 2016, but was never used before the AFL abolished it in 2019.
  - Before the 2016 season, the only exception to this rule was the AFL Grand Final, which used a full replay in case of a drawn match, and only used extra time if the score was tied at the end of regular time in the replay. The AFL extended its extra-time procedure to the Grand Final in 2016, thereby abolishing Grand Final replays.
- In most codes of bowling, ties are allowed to stand, but most organizations have tiebreaker procedures should a winner be necessary (such as in tournament settings).
- In gaelic football and hurling, two straight ten-minute periods are played each way after a draw. In major Gaelic football and hurling tournaments, a further two straight five-minute periods may be played each way if the scores are still level, with penalties thereafter.
- In shinty, a 30 minute period of extra time is played after a draw during a cup competition. If the scores are still level, the match is decided using a penalty shootout.
- In knockout futsal matches, two extra time periods of five minutes each are played, with teams changing ends in between. If the teams are still tied after extra time, the match is decided with a penalty shootout.
- In water polo, if the score is tied at the end of regulation play the game goes to penalty shootouts. In college play teams play two straight 3-minute periods, and if still tied multiple 3-minute golden goal periods thereafter. Same for high school, but may incorporate both methods.
- If a game of curling is tied at the end of its prescribed number of rounds (called ends), extra ends are played until there is a winner.
- In netball matches, two straight 7-minute periods of extra time are played, with teams changing ends in between (with no break between periods). If the scores are still tied after the overtime, the match continues uninterrupted. Whoever is up two goals will be the winners. This is known as double overtime should a match end this way. All ANZ Championship matches (2008–2014), ANZ Championship finals (2015–2016), ANZ Premiership, Super Netball, Commonwealth Games finals and World Netball Championships finals implement this tiebreaker to ensure a winner.
- In touch football under the Federation of International Touch structure, finals matches that are drawn at full-time progress into an extra time period known as a "drop-off". During a drop-off, each team reduces their on-field playing strength by one player every two minutes, until teams are down to three players. Both teams must have had possession of the ball before a result can be declared.
- In kabaddi, ties are initially broken by giving each team five raids, with various rules relaxed to encourage point-scoring. If the tie is still not broken, a "golden raid" is performed in which sudden death-style rules apply.
- In kho-kho, the tiebreaker is known as a "Minimum Chase", wherein each team gets an additional turn to score, and the team that scores its first point faster wins.
- In NASCAR, NASCAR Overtime, or "Green-White-Checkered", extends races past their scheduled distance to ensure a green flag finish when a caution occurs near the end; it provides two laps to race under green, with unlimited attempts until the leader takes the white flag (signaling the final lap), after which the next flag (checkered or yellow) ends the race, with rules simplified over time to focus on getting to a conclusive finish. If the leader does not get to the white flag, and the caution flag is thrown, then another attempt is taken, and this is repeated until the leader takes the white flag.

== Longest games ==
=== American football ===
- Six National Football League playoff games have gone into double overtime, the longest being an AFC divisional playoff game on 25 December 1971. The Miami Dolphins defeated the Kansas City Chiefs 27–24 at 7:40 into double overtime (at 82:40 of total play, the longest game in NFL history). Garo Yepremian kicked a walk-off field goal to win it. The length of the game, coupled with the fact that it was played on Christmas Day, led to a great deal of controversy and the league placed an 18-year moratorium on Christmas games. The most recent 2OT NFL game came in an AFC divisional playoff game on 12 January 2013, with the Baltimore Ravens beating the Denver Broncos 38–35 on a field goal at 1:42 of double overtime. Justin Tucker kicked a walk-off field goal to win it.
- In the former American Football League, the championship game played on 23 December 1962, the Dallas Texans defeated the Houston Oilers 20–17 on a 25-yard field goal at 2:54 into double overtime. (This game, along with all other AFL games, was incorporated into the NFL record books following the 1970 merger of the two leagues.)
- The former United States Football League had a triple-overtime playoff game on 30 June 1984, with the Los Angeles Express defeating the Michigan Panthers 27–21 on a walk-off touchdown 3:33 of triple overtime. At 93:33 of total play, this is the longest professional football game ever played in the United States.
- Collegiate (NCAA Division I FBS, formerly Division I-A): Six games have gone to seven overtimes, and one game has gone to nine overtimes:
  - On 24 November 2018, Texas A&M beat LSU 74–72 in a game that had been tied 31–all at end of regulation. This game directly led to the NCAA's 2019 change in overtime rules that calls for all overtime procedures after the fourth to be played (and scored) as two-point conversion attempts, also adopted for Texas high schools because that state's high school governing bodies base their rules on the NCAA set.
  - On 23 October 2021, Illinois beat Penn State 20–18 in nine overtimes in the longest game in FBS history. This game, tied 10-all at the end of regulation, took place after a further NCAA rule change that calls for all overtime procedures after the second (instead of the fourth) to be played and scored as two-point conversion attempts. This rule change was also adopted for Texas high schools.
- Collegiate (NCAA Division I FCS, formerly Division I-AA) – 27 September 1998: Bethune-Cookman University recorded a 63–57 victory over Virginia State University, ending in eight overtimes.
- High school – 29 October 2010: Jacksonville High School (TX) beat Nacogdoches High School (TX) 84–81 after 12 OT's. Nacogdoches could have won in earlier overtime periods, but needed a win by 8 points to keep its postseason hopes alive and so they intentionally forced additional overtime periods rather than win by fewer than 8 points (in some states which use point differential to break ties within a district, such as Kansas, teams can gain or lose only one point in a game which goes to overtime, regardless of the final margin).

=== Association football ===
- In the past, some football competitions also allowed successive extra time before the use of penalty shoot-outs. The final game of the 1977 Campeonato Pernambucano de Futebol, which ended with the victory of Sport Recife over Náutico, was decided in the fourth extra time of 15 minutes each, resulting in a game of 158 minutes duration.
- The 1922 Final for the German Championship between Hamburger SV and 1. FC Nürnberg had to be called off after 189 minutes at 2–2 as the coming dusk made play impossible. The rematch seven weeks later was also called off after 158 minutes at 1–1, as Nürnberg were unable to field the minimum of eight players due to injuries, with no substitutions being allowed under the rules of the time.
- The 1982 and 1985 NCAA Division I men's soccer finals both went to the 8th (10-minute) period of extra time before being decided, lasting into the 160th and 167th minutes respectively.
- In Game 1 of the 1971 North American Soccer League playoffs semifinal (best of three series) between the Dallas Tornado and the Rochester Lancers, league scoring champion Carlos Metidieri of Rochester mercifully ended the match in the 6th overtime at the 176th minute, less than four minutes shy of playing two complete games. Seven days later in Game 3, the two teams also played a 4-OT, 148 minute match with Dallas winning this time. Incredibly, only four days after that, Dallas lost Game 1 of the NASL Championship Series in the 3rd OT to Atlanta in the 123rd minute. All totaled, Dallas played 537 minutes of football (3 minutes short of six games) in 13 days' time.

=== Baseball ===
- MLB – American League – 8 May 1984: Chicago White Sox beat the Milwaukee Brewers 7–6 in 25 innings. The game took 8 hours and 6 minutes to decide; play was suspended after 17 innings with the score tied 3-3 and resumed the next night. Harold Baines hit a walk-off home run to win it.
- MLB – National League – 1 May 1926: Game between the Brooklyn Robins and Boston Braves ended in a 1–all tie after 26 innings.
- MLB – By time length – 3 June 1989: Timewise, the Houston Astros beat the L.A. Dodgers 5–4 in 22 innings as Rafael Ramírez hit a walk-off single off Jeff Hamilton to end the 7-hour-14-minute contest. Bill Doran scored the winning run, and Fernando Valenzuela was playing first baseman that night.
- MLB Playoffs – 15 October 2022: The Houston Astros beat the Seattle Mariners in the longest shutout game in postseason history, 1–0 in 18 innings. The game was 6 hours, 22 minutes long. Jeremy Peña hit a solo shot to lead off the 18th, and Luis García was the winning pitcher. The 17 scoreless innings in a game set a playoff record.
- World Series – 26 October 2018: Los Angeles Dodgers beat the Boston Red Sox 3–2 in 18 innings as Max Muncy hit a walk-off solo shot off Nathan Eovaldi. It took 7 hours, 20 minutes, an MLB playoff record, to finish.
- 27 October 2025: Los Angeles Dodgers beat the Toronto Blue Jays 6-5 in 18 innings as Freddie Freeman hit a walk-off solo shot off Brendon Little to end the 6-hour, 39-minute contest.
- Minor league – International League – 18 April 1981: In the longest professional baseball game, with 8 hours and 25 minutes of playing time, the Pawtucket Red Sox defeated the Rochester Red Wings 3–2 in 33 innings. The game was suspended at the end of the 32nd inning at 4:09 am local time and resumed one month later. The decisive 33rd inning took just 18 minutes to play.
- Collegiate – 30 May 2009: The Texas Longhorns defeated the Boston College Eagles 3–2 in 25 innings in the Austin regional of the 2009 NCAA Division I Baseball Championship tournament.

=== Basketball ===
- International basketball:
  - Summer Olympics: Six games needed two overtimes to finish, four of them in the men's tournament and two in the women's tournament:
    - 2016 men: Argentina defeated Brazil 111–107
    - 2000 men: Canada defeated Russia 86–83
    - 1996 women: Turkey defeated Brazil 79–76
    - 1996 men: Lithuania defeated Croatia 83–81
    - 1996 men: Australia defeated Brazil 109–101
    - 1992 women: Spain defeated Italy 92–80
  - FIBA Basketball World Cup: In the 2006 FIBA World Championship, Germany defeated Angola 108–103 after triple overtime.
  - FIBA Women's Basketball World Cup: In the 1953 FIBA World Championship for Women, Paraguay defeated Cuba 69–59 after double overtime.
  - FIBA men's continental championships: In EuroBasket 1953, Yugoslavia defeated Israel 57–55 after four overtimes.
  - FIBA women's continental championships: These games needed two overtime periods to finish:
    - AfroBasket Women 2017: Tunisia def. Ivory Coast 69–94
    - 2011 FIBA Asia Championship for Women: South Korea def. China 99–93
    - EuroBasket Women 2011: Latvia def. Israel 83–82
    - EuroBasket Women 2005: Belarus def. Norway 84–78
    - 2004 FIBA Asia Championship for Women: Japan def. South Korea 82–71
    - EuroBasket Women 1995: Hungary def. Spain 108–105
    - EuroBasket Women 1980: Netherlands def. Bulgaria 83–81
- NBA – 6 January 1951: The Indianapolis Olympians and the Rochester Royals played six overtimes, with Indianapolis winning 75–73 in a four-hour game.
- US Collegiate
  - NCAA Division I – 21 December 1981: Cincinnati edged Bradley 75–73 in seven overtimes.
  - NCAA Division II/NAIA– 18 February 1956: Black Hills edged Yankton (a college which no longer exists) 80–79 after seven extra periods.NAIA Men's Basketball Regular Season Records
  - NCAA Division III – 24 November 2010: Skidmore edged Southern Vermont 128–123, also in seven overtimes. Skidmore survives to win longest game ever
- US, High School
  - North Carolina – 29 February 1964: Boone Trail won over Angier 56–54, after 13 overtimes in the Harnett County 1A Conference Tournament championship at the Carter Gymnasium, Buies Creek.
  - Indiana – 15 March 1964: Swayzee won over Liberty Center 65–61, after a state record 9 overtimes in a regional tournament game in Marion. Throwback game to honor 50th anniversary of 9-OT game

=== Camogie ===
- "Extra extra time" was played in the 2015 Ashbourne Cup final.

=== Hurling ===
- A semi-final of the 2014 Ulster Senior Hurling Championship went to 30 minutes of extra time. After Down and Derry finished level (3–23 to 4-20) after the usual 20 minutes (two periods of 10 minutes duration) of extra time, it was agreed by both teams to play another ten minutes of extra time (two periods of 5 minutes). After this, the game was still tied: 3–28 to 5–22 after 100 minutes play.

=== Ice hockey ===
- Olympics — At the 2018 Winter Games, the USA defeated Canada 3–2 in a shootout in the women's final after both teams went the entire 20-minute overtime period scoreless; Jocelyne Lamoureux-Davidson scored in the 6th shootout round. The men's final at the same Olympics also went into overtime; Kirill Kaprizov, playing for the Olympic Athletes from Russia, scored at 9:40 of overtime, resulting in a 4–3 win over Germany. The overtime procedure for gold-medal games is multiple 20-minute 3-on-3 periods until one team scores come 2022.
- GET-ligaen (premier Norwegian ice hockey league) - 12 March 2017: Storhamar beat Sparta 2–1 in octuple overtime after Joakim Jensen scored the game winner at 17:14 of the 8th overtime period, for a total of 157:14 of overtime and a game length of 217:14.
- NHL – 23 March 1936: The Detroit Red Wings beat the Montreal Maroons 1–0 in sextuple overtime and after a total of 116:30 minutes had been played in overtime.
- Collegiate (NCAA Division I, men's) – 6 March 2015: In a Hockey East men's first round, UMass beat Notre Dame 4–3 in quintuple overtime, after 151:42 minutes of play. Yale University @ Union College & Quinnipiac University @ Union College also extended 5 overtimes.
- Collegiate (NCAA Division I, women's) – 22 February 2020: In a New England Women's Hockey Alliance tournament semifinal, Saint Anselm defeated Franklin Pierce 2–1 at 12:36 of quintuple overtime (152:36 overall time).
- High School (Ohio High School Athletic Association)- The 2014 state championship game between Sylvania Northview (OH) and Cleveland St. Ignatius (OH) ended in a 1–1 tie after 7th (8 minute) overtime period by mutual agreement, mostly due to concerns over player safety. In response, all tournaments since 2015 allow a limit of five overtime periods, with 4-on-4 play starting on the 2nd overtime period, and a 3-player shootout commencing after all periods were played. In terms of number of periods, the 1977 North Dakota state high school hockey championship game between Grand Forks Central and Grand Forks Red River, tied 1–1 after regulation, went eight scoreless five-minute overtime periods. Officials, citing player safety concerns, stopped play after the eighth overtime and declared the teams co-champions.

=== Lacrosse ===
- Collegiate (NCAA Division I, men's) – 28 March 2009: The Virginia Cavaliers team played in the longest game in the history of NCAA Division I lacrosse—a 10–9 victory over the Maryland Terrapins in seven overtime periods.

=== Rugby league ===
The longest rugby league game at first class level is 104 minutes, during the 1997 Super League Tri-series final between New South Wales and Queensland.

After the regular game time of 80 minutes expired with scores level, a further 20 minutes was played. When scores remained level after 100 minutes, golden point extra time was invoked, with a Noel Goldthorpe field goal ending the game after 104 minutes.

At a lower level, the 2015 Group 21 grand final lasted 128 minutes.

=== Tennis ===
The Isner–Mahut match at the 2010 Wimbledon Championships was a first round Men's Singles match, in which the American 23rd seed John Isner played French qualifier Nicolas Mahut. In total, the match took 11 hours, 5 minutes of play over three days, with a final score of 6–4, 3–6, 6–7^{(7–9)}, 7–6^{(7–3)}, 70–68 for a total of 183 games. It remains by far the longest match in tennis history, measured both by time and number of games. The final set alone was longer than the previous longest match.

The official longest tie-break on record, 50 points, came in the first round of Wimbledon in 1985 when Michael Mortensen and Jan Gunnarson defeated John Frawley and Victor Pecci 6–4, 6–4, 3–6, 7–6^{(26–24)}. Of note is an even longer tie-break of 70 points, with Benjamin Balleret defeating Guillaume Couillard 7–6^{(36–34)}, 6–1. The match, held in Plantation, FL in 2013, was only a qualifying match in a Futures event, the lowest level tournament in pro tennis. All matches in qualifying are played without any chair umpire or any lines people. Without any official scorecard, this record is not official.

Since 2022, all 5th-set tiebreakers for men's (3rd-set for women's) are broken using the "super tiebreaker", with the first to reach 10 points winning the match; this began with the Australian Open. If the tiebreaker game deciding the match is tied at 9–9 (or any tie hereafter), whoever scores two straight points wins. This includes the French Open & Olympics.

== Summary ==
Length is in minutes unless otherwise specified.

Sport	Competition	Length in minutes		Percent of length	Number of extra periods allowed	Sudden death?	If still tied at the end of the overtime period(s)	Applicable to
Sport	Competition	Overtime period	Entire match	Percent of length	Number of extra periods allowed	Sudden death?	If still tied at the end of the overtime period(s)	Applicable to
Gridiron football	NFL regular season	10	60 (48 in NFHS)	17%	1	Modified sudden death	The match will end in a tie.	All matches
Gridiron football	NFL playoffs	15	60 (48 in NFHS)	25%	Until winner is determined	Modified sudden death	Another overtime period will be played.	All matches
Gridiron football	NCAA football NFHS football CFL	Untimed	60 (48 in NFHS)	—N/a	2 (CFL regular season); Until a winner is produced (NCAA, CFL playoffs, NFHS)	Each team has one possession	Regular-season games in the CFL end in a tie after two overtime procedures (another overtime procedure is played during postseason games). In the NCAA and the NFHS, another overtime procedure is played; games can only end in a tie if inclement weather forces a game stoppage and curfew are in place.	All matches
Association football	universal	30	90	33%	1 (divided into 2 halves)	1992–2004 (golden goal)	The match will proceed to a best-of-5 penalty shootout, then sudden death penalty shootouts if still tied. Since 2022, includes NCAA.	Decisive matches only
Australian rules football	AFL finals series	6	80	8%	Until winner is determined	No	Another overtime period will be played.	All matches
Basketball	NBA preseason	5	48	10%	Until winner is determined	Rarely used	Another overtime period will be played. Following the first overtime period, double overtime and thereafter could be sudden death due to time constraints (but only during preseason games and Summer League games).	Competitive matches only
Basketball	NBA regular season/playoffs	5	48	10%	Until winner is determined	No	Another overtime period will be played. Following the first overtime period, double overtime and thereafter could be sudden death due to time constraints (but only during preseason games and Summer League games).	Competitive matches only
Basketball	NBA G League regular season	Untimed	48	—N/a	1	Yes	Overtime is held under Elam Ending conditions, with the first team scoring 7 or more points in overtime winning.	Competitive matches only
Basketball	FIBA 3x3	Untimed	10	—N/a	1	Yes	A tie at the end of overtime is impossible. An overtime in 3x3 will end once either team has scored 2 points in overtime, equal to one basket from behind the "three-point" arc or any combination of two regular baskets and free throws.	Competitive matches only
Basketball	NFHS	4	32	13%	Until winner is determined	No	Another overtime period will be played.	Competitive matches only
Basketball	NCAA basketball WNBA; FIBA World Cup	5	40	13%	Until winner is determined	No	Another overtime period will be played.	
Gaelic games (Gaelic football, hurling, camogie)	Senior inter-county Gaelic football and hurling	20	70	29%	1 (divided into 2 halves)	No	The match is replayed at a later date. In some competitions, a free-taking contest will decide the winner.	Knockout competitions only
Gaelic games (Gaelic football, hurling, camogie)	All other games	20	60	33%	1 (divided into 2 halves)	No	The match is replayed at a later date. In some competitions, a free-taking contest will decide the winner.	Knockout competitions only
Ice hockey	North American professional regular season	5	60	8%	1	Yes	The match will proceed to a 3-on-3 shootout, then additional sudden-death shootout rounds if still tied.	Competitive matches only
Ice hockey	Professional playoffs and regular season tiebreaker games	20	60	33%	Until winner is determined	Yes	Another overtime period will be played.	All matches
Team handball	universal	10	60	17%	2 (each divided into two halves)	No	The match will proceed to sudden-death penalty shootouts.	Certain matches only
Roller derby	WFTDA/MRDA rules	2	60	3%	Until winner is determined	No	Another overtime jam will be played.	All matches
Rugby league	Certain leagues	10	80	13%	1 (divided into two halves)	No	Either the match will end in a draw, or another overtime period will be played.	Certain matches only
Rugby sevens	universal	5	14 (Note: 20 minutes in the championship match of a competition)	36% (Note: 25% of regular time in competition finals)	Until winner is determined	Yes	Another overtime period will be played.	Decisive matches only
Rugby union	universal	20 (first); 10 (second)	80	25% (first); 13% (second)	2 (first period divided into two halves)	Only during second extra time period	If the match remains tied after the first 20 minutes of extra time, 10 minutes of sudden-death extra time are played. If still level, the match will proceed to a kicking competition.	Decisive matches only

== See also ==
- Tiebreaker
- Green–white–checker finish, the procedure used in motorsport to add extra laps if a Safety Car situation is in effect when the race has reached the scheduled lap count.
- Replay (sports), a procedure in some sports to resolve a tied game in which a game is played from the beginning, with the original match discarded.
