= Artur Sitkowski =

American football player and coach (born 2000)

Current position
- Title: Assistant quarterbacks coach
- Team: Illinois Fighting Illini

Biographical details
- Born: May 16, 2000 (age 26)

Playing career
- 2018–2020: Rutgers
- 2021–2022: Illinois
- Position: Quarterback

Coaching career (HC unless noted)
- 2023–present: Illinois (assistant)

Artur Sitkowski (born May 16, 2000) is an American college football coach. He is the assistant quarterbacks coach for the University of Illinois Urbana-Champaign, a position he has held since 2024. He played college football for Illinois and Rutgers.

== Early life ==
Sitkowski attended Old Bridge High School in Old Bridge Township, New Jersey, before transferring to IMG Academy. As a junior, Sitkowski completed 104 of 209 passes for 1,216 yards with six touchdowns and nine interceptions and rushed 77 times for 215 yards and eight touchdowns. Sitkowski originally committed to play college football for the Miami Hurricanes. However, Sitkowski flipped his commitment to play for the Rutgers Scarlet Knights.

== College career ==
=== Rutgers ===
Sitkowski opened his true freshman season in 2018 as Rutgers starting quarterback. In his first start he completed 20 passes for 205 yards with a touchdown and three interceptions in a win over Texas State. In week 7 of the 2018 season, Sitkowski completed just two of his 16 pass attempts for eight yards and four interceptions in a loss to Maryland. He finished the 2018 season completing 134 of 273 pass attempts for 1,158 yards and four touchdowns to 18 interceptions. Ahead of the 2019 season, Sitkowski lost the starting job to McLane Carter. He made his first start of the 2019 season in week 4 after Carter suffered a concussion. Sitkowski completed 23 of 33 passing attempts for 304 yards and a touchdown with an interception in a 30–16 loss to Boston College. However after just making one more start against Michigan, Sitkowski took a redshirt. After the 2019 season, he entered the NCAA transfer portal. However, Sitkowski decided to withdraw from the portal and return to play for the Scarlet Knights in 2020. He made his first start of the 2020 season in week 7 versus Purdue, completing 18 of 27 passes for 141 yards and two touchdowns in an upset win over Purdue. Sitkowski finished the 2020 season going 52 of 82 on his passes for 44 yards and three touchdowns. After the conclusion of the 2020 season, he entered the NCAA transfer portal.

=== Illinois ===
Sitkowski transferred to play for Illinois. He made his Illinois debut in week one after starter Brandon Peters went down with an injury and completed 12 of his 15 passes for 124 yards and two touchdowns, as he helped lead the Fighting Illini to a 30–22 win over Nebraska. Sitkowski was named the team's starter for their week two matchup versus UTSA. In his start he threw for 266 yards and three touchdowns in a loss to UTSA. In week 9 of the 2021 season, after Sitkowski helped the Fighting Illini upset #7 Penn State in the longest game in NCAA history it was revealed, Sitkowski broke his arm and would miss the rest of the 2021 season. Sitkowski finished the 2021 season completing 74 of his 148 pass attempts for 704 yards and six touchdowns with two interceptions, while also adding 31 yards on the ground. In week 6 of the 2022 season, Sitkowski replaced injured starter Tommy DeVito. Sitkowski completed 13 of his 19 passes for 74 yards and an interception in a 9–6 win over Iowa. In Sitkowski's final season he completed 18 of his 25 pass attempts for 103 yards and an interception, while adding 18 yards on the ground.

=== College statistics ===
Year	Team	Games		Passing								Rushing			
Year	Team	GP	Record	Cmp	Att	Pct	Yds	Avg	TD	Int	Rtg	Att	Yds	Avg	TD
2018	Rutgers	11	1–10	134	273	49.1	1,158	4.2	4	18	76.4	22	−66	−3.0	0
2019	Rutgers	3	0–2	44	68	64.7	429	6.3	1	2	116.7	8	−7	−0.88	0
2020	Rutgers	4	1–1	52	81	64.2	444	6.2	3	0	122.5	14	2	0.14	0
2021	Illinois	5	1–2	74	148	50.0	704	4.8	6	0	100.6	26	31	1.19	0
2022	Illinois	3	–	18	25	72.0	103	4.1	0	1	98.6	5	18	3.6	0
Career		26	3–15	322	595	54.1	2,838	4.8	14	23	94.2	75	-22	-0.29	0

== Coaching career ==
After the 2022 season, Sitkowski joined the Illinois football coaching staff as a graduate assistant.
