= 2021 Illinois Fighting Illini football team =

American college football season

2021 Illinois Fighting Illini football
- Conference: Big Ten Conference
- West Division
- Record: 5–7 (4–5 Big Ten)
- Head coach: Bret Bielema (1st season)
- Offensive coordinator: Tony Petersen (1st season)
- Offensive scheme: Multiple
- Defensive coordinator: Ryan Walters (1st season)
- Base defense: 4–3
- Home stadium: Memorial Stadium

Uniform
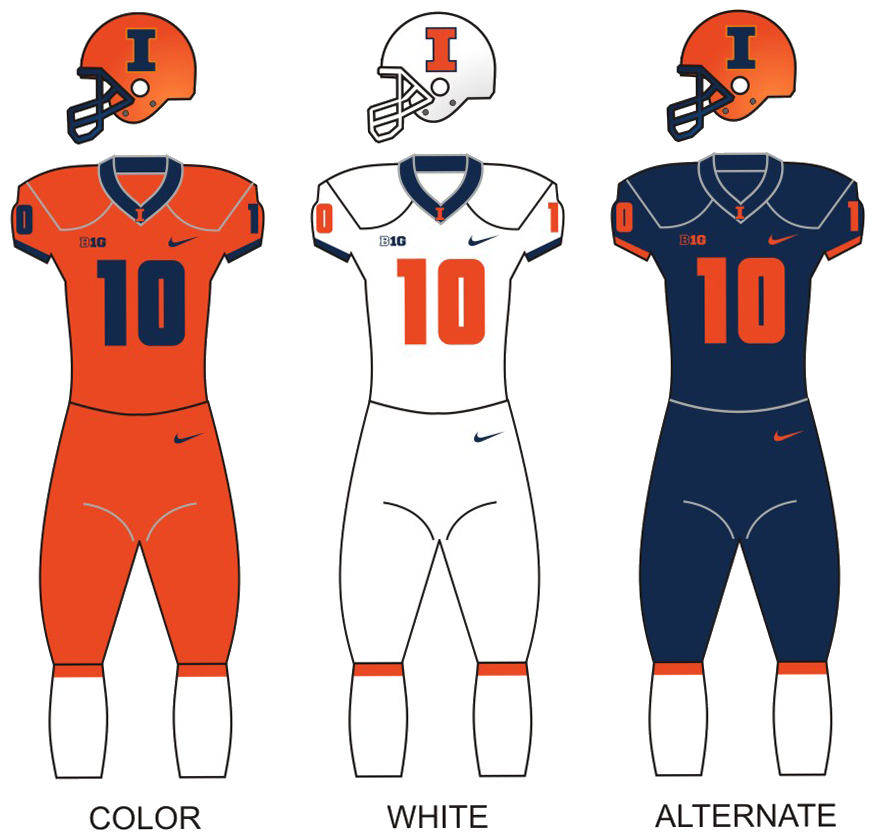

2021 Big Ten Conference football standings
	Conf.			Overall
Team	W		L	W		L
East Division
No. 3 Michigan xy$^	8	–	1	12	–	2
No. 6 Ohio State x	8	–	1	11	–	2
No. 9 Michigan State	7	–	2	11	–	2
Penn State	4	–	5	7	–	6
Maryland	3	–	6	7	–	6
Rutgers	2	–	7	5	–	8
Indiana	0	–	9	2	–	10
West Division
No. 23 Iowa xy	7	–	2	10	–	4
Minnesota	6	–	3	9	–	4
Wisconsin	6	–	3	9	–	4
Purdue	6	–	3	9	–	4
Illinois	4	–	5	5	–	7
Nebraska	1	–	8	3	–	9
Northwestern	1	–	8	3	–	9
Championship: Michigan 42, Iowa 3
^ – College Football Playoff participant; $ – Conference champion; x – Division champion/co-champions; y – Championship game participant; Rankings from AP Poll

The 2021 Illinois Fighting Illini football team was an American football team that represented the University of Illinois Urbana-Champaign as a member of the Big Ten Conference during the 2021 NCAA Division I FBS football season. In their first season under head coach Bret Bielema, the Fighting Illini compiled a 5–7 record (4–5 in conference games), finished in fifth place in the Big Ten's West Division, and were outscored by a total of 263 to 242. The team's 20–18 victory over No. 7 Penn State set an NCAA single-game record with nine overtime periods.

The team's statistical leaders included quarterback Brandon Peters (1,170 passing yards, 53.8% completion percentage), running back Chase Brown (1,005 rushing yards), wide receiver Isaiah Williams (47 receptions for 525 yards), kicker James McCourt (80 points, 26 of 26 extra points, 18 of 23 field goals), and defensive back Sydney Brown (81 total tackles, 50 solo tackles). Defensive back Kerby Joseph received first-team honors from the media on the 2021 All-Big Ten Conference football team.

The team played its home games at Memorial Stadium in Champaign, Illinois.

== Preseason ==
=== Big Ten media poll ===
The Illini were predicted to finish seventh in the Big Ten's West Division.

Big Ten West Division media poll
Predicted finish	Team	Votes (1st place)
1	Wisconsin	233 (29)
2	Iowa	202 (5)
3	Northwestern	160
4	Minnesota	146
5	Nebraska	91.5
6	Purdue	72.5
7	Illinois	47

== Schedule ==
Date	Time	Opponent	Site	TV	Result	Attendance
August 28	12:00 p.m.	Nebraska	Memorial Stadium (Note: Illinois and Nebraska were originally scheduled to play at Aviva Stadium in Dublin, Ireland for the Aer Lingus College Football Classic. The game was moved back to the United States due to travel concerns during the COVID-19 pandemic.); Champaign, IL (Aer Lingus College Football Classic)	FOX	W 30–22	41,064
September 4	6:30 p.m.	UTSA*	Memorial Stadium; Champaign, IL	BTN	L 30–37	33,906
September 11	10:00 a.m.	at Virginia*	Scott Stadium; Charlottesville, VA	ACCN	L 14–42	36,036
September 17	8:00 p.m.	Maryland	Memorial Stadium; Champaign, IL	FS1	L 17–20	37,168
September 25	2:30 p.m.	at Purdue	Ross–Ade Stadium; West Lafayette, IN (Purdue Cannon)	BTN	L 9–13	52,840
October 2	11:00 a.m.	Charlotte*	Memorial Stadium; Champaign, IL	BTN	W 24–14	30,559
October 9	2:30 p.m.	Wisconsin^{†}	Memorial Stadium; Champaign, IL	BTN	L 0–24	40,168
October 23	11:00 a.m.	at No. 7 Penn State	Beaver Stadium; University Park, PA	ABC	W 20–18 ^{9OT}	105,001
October 30	11:00 a.m.	Rutgers	Memorial Stadium; Champaign, IL	BTN	L 14–20	36,942
November 6	11:00 a.m.	at No. 20 Minnesota	Huntington Bank Stadium; Minneapolis, MN	ESPN2	W 14–6	46,382
November 20	1:00 p.m.	at No. 17 Iowa	Kinnick Stadium; Iowa City, IA	FS1	L 23–33	64,132
November 27	2:30 p.m.	Northwestern	Memorial Stadium; Champaign, IL (Land of Lincoln Trophy)	BTN	W 47–14	27,624
*Non-conference game; ^{†}Homecoming; Rankings from AP Poll (and CFP Rankings, after November 2) - Released prior to game; All times are in Central time; Source:

== Personnel ==
=== Coaching staff ===
Name	Position	Consecutive season at Illinois in current position
Bret Bielema	Head coach	1st
Tony Petersen	Offensive coordinator	1st
Ryan Walters	Defensive coordinator	1st
Ben Miller	Tight ends coach/special teams coordinator	1st
George McDonald	Wide receivers coach / assistant head coach	1st
Bart Miller	Offensive line coach	1st
Cory Patterson	Running backs coach	4th
Terrance Jamison	Defensive line coach	1st
Andy Buh	Linebackers coach	1st
Kevin Kane	Outside linebackers coach / associate head coach	1st
Aaron Henry	Defensive backs coach	1st

=== Roster ===
2021 Illinois Fighting Illini football team roster
Players
Coaches
Offense

Pos.	#	Name	Class
RB	0	Josh McCray	Fr
WR	1	Isaiah Williams	Fr
RB	2	Chase Brown	So
RB	3	Jakari Norwood	So
WR	4	Khmari Thompson	So
WR	5	Caleb Griffin	So
WR	6	Deuce Spann	Fr
WR	7	Brian Hightower	Jr
WR	8	Jafar Armstrong	Jr
QB	9	Artur Sitkowski	So
WR	10	Desmond Dan Jr	Sr
WR	11	Carlos Sandy	So
QB	12	Matt Robinson	So
WR	13	Pat Bryant	Fr
WR	14	Casey Washington	So
WR	15	Ty Lindenman	Fr
QB	16	Samari Collier	Fr
QB	17	Ryan Johnson	Jr
QB	18	Brandon Peters	Sr
WR	19	Dalevon Campbell	So
RB	22	Chase Hayden	Jr
RB	23	Reggie Love III	Fr
RB	24	Nick Fedanzo	Fr
RB	26	Mike Epstein	Sr
RB	27	Matt Bobak	Fr
TE	40	Lucas Althaus	Fr
TE	41	Preston Engel	So
TE	42	Michael Marchese	Sr
TE	43	Griffin Moore	Fr
TE	48	Mike Cernigila Jr	Fr
TE	49	Max Rosenthal	Jr
OL	53	Devin Hale	Fr
OL	54	Julian Pearl	So
OL	55	Blake Jeresaty	Sr
OL	57	Evan Kirts	Fr
OL	59	Josh Plohr	Fr
OL	62	Terry Zapf	So
OL	63	Alex Palczewski	Sr
OL	64	Josh Kreutz	Fr
OL	65	Doug Kramer	Sr
OL	66	Jordyn Slaughter (injured)	So
OL	67	Brody Wisecarver	Fr
OL	68	Zachary Barlev	Fr
OL	70	Tommy Cronin	Fr
OL	72	Jack Badovinac	Sr
OL	73	Josh Gesky	Fr
OL	75	Alex Pihlstrom	Jr
OL	79	Vederian Lowe	Sr
WR	80	Peyton Vining	Jr
WR	81	Marquez Beason	Fr
TE	82	Luke Ford	Jr
WR	83	Keion Battle	Fr
WR	84	Owen Hickey	Fr
WR	85	Miles Scott	Fr
WR	86	Donny Navarro	Jr
TE	87	Daniel Barker	Jr
TE	88	Branden Hohenstein	Sr
TE	89	Tip Reiman	Fr

Defense

Pos.	#	Name	Class
DB	1	Kionte Curry	Fr
DB	2	Daniel Edwards	Fr
DB	2	Derrick Smith	Jr
DB	3	DD Snyder II	Fr
LB	5	Calvin Hart Jr (injured)	So
DB	6	Tony Adams	Sr
DB	7	Kendall Smith	Sr
DB	8	Eddie Smith	So
DB	9	Coran Taylor	So
DB	10	Tahveon Nicholson	Fr
DB	15	Prince Green	Fr
DB	20	Tyler Strain	Fr
DB	21	Quan Martin	Jr
DB	22	Dylan Thomas	So
DB	24	Prather Hudson	Sr
DB	25	Kerby Joseph	Jr
OLB	26	DJ Johnson	Fr
DB	27	Mike Manning	So
LB	28	Dylan Rosiek	Fr
DB	29	Christian Bobak	Sr
DB	30	Sydney Brown	Jr
DB	31	Devon Witherspoon	So
DB	32	Tailon Leitzsey	Sr
OLB	33	Ezekiel Holmes	So
LB	34	Ryan Meed	Fr
LB	35	Jake Hansen	Sr
OLB	36	Ben Schultz	Fr
DB	37	Jaden Jones-Watkins	So
LB	38	Isaac Darkangelo	Jr
LB	39	Kenenna Odeluga	Fr
OLB	40	Shammond Cooper	Fr
DB	41	Joriell Washington	Fr
LB	42	Luke Zardzin	Fr
OLB	43	Marko Rajkovic	Fr
LB	44	Tarique Barnes	So
LB	45	Khalan Tolson	Jr
LB	46	Alex McEachern	Jr
LB	48	Bryce Barnes	So
OLB	49	Seth Coleman	Fr
LB	51	Sean Coghlan	Jr
DL	52	Verdis Brown	So
LB	54	Kalen Villanueva	Fr
DL	55	Sed McConnell	Fr
DL	88	Keith Randolph Jr.	Fr
OLB	90	Alec Bryant	Fr
DL	91	Jamal Woods	Sr
OLB	92	Isaiah Gay	Sr
DL	93	Calvin Avery	Jr
DL	94	Johnny Newton	Fr
DL	96	Roderick Perry II	Sr
DL	98	Deon Pate	Jr
OLB	99	Owen Carney Jr.	Sr

Special teams

Pos.	#	Name	Class
K	5	Caleb Griffin	So
P	14	Blake Hayes	Sr
K, P	17	James McCourt	Sr
P	19	Hugh Robertson	Fr
LS	36	Lane Hansen	Fr
LS	39	Aidan Hall	Fr
LS	56	Ethan Tabel	Sr

Head coach

- Bret Bielema

Coordinators/assistant coaches

- Tony Petersen – Offensive coordinator / quarterbacks
- Ryan Walters – Defensive coordinator
- Ben Miller – Special teams coordinator/tight ends
- Cory Patterson – Running backs
- Terrance Jamison – Defensive line
- George McDonald – Wide receivers / assistant HC
- Aaron Henry – Defensive backs
- Bart Miller – Offensive line
- Andy Buh – Linebackers
- Kevin Kane – outside linebackers / associate HC
- Reggie Bain – Graduate assistant – offense
- Taylor Reed – Graduate assistant – offense
- Aaron Gonzales – Graduate assistant – defense
- Kevin Laeone Richardson II – Graduate assistant – defense
- John Marinelli – Senior analyst
- Grant O'Brien – Defensive analyst
- Adam Kleffner – Offensive analyst
- Greg Froelich – Special teams analyst
- Tank Wright – Head strength and conditioning coach
- Pete Roley – Director of football operations
- Mark Taurisani – Football chief of staff
- Patrick Embleton – Director of recruiting
- Terry Hawthorne – Director of high school personnel
- Pat Ryan – Director of high school relations
- Nate McNeal – Assistant recruiting coordinator
- Travis Perry – Director of creative content

Legend

- (C) Team captain
- (S) Suspended
- (I) Ineligible
- Injured
- Redshirt

Roster

== Game summaries ==
=== Nebraska ===
Nebraska Cornhuskers at Illinois Fighting Illini – Game summary

Quarter	1	2	3	4	Total
Cornhuskers	0	9	7	6	22
Fighting Illini	2	14	14	0	30

at Memorial Stadium, Champaign, Illinois

- Date: August 28
- Game time: 12:00 p.m. CDT
- Game weather: Sunny, 94 °F (34 °C)
- Game attendance: 41,064
- Referee: John O'Neill
- TV announcers (FOX): Joe Davis and Brock Huard
- Box score, Recap

Game information
First quarter
- ILL – Cam Taylor-Britt tackled in own end zone by Kerby Joseph, 4:07. Fighting Illini 2–0.

Second quarter

- NEB – Markese Stepp 2-yard run (kick failed), 14:25. Cornhuskers 6–2. Drive: 7 plays, 63 yards, 2:27.
- NEB – Connor Culp 27-yard field goal, 9:15. Cornhuskers 9–2. Drive: 8 plays, 60 yards, 3:01.
- ILL – Mike Epstein 1-yard run (James McCourt kick), 2:51. Tied 9–9. Drive: 11 plays, 75 yards, 6:24.
- ILL – Calvin Hart Jr. 41-yard fumble return (James McCourt kick), 0:37. Fighting Illini 16–9.

Third quarter

- ILL – Luke Ford 2-yard pass from Artur Sitkowski (James McCourt kick), 6:56. Fighting Illini 23–9. Drive: 14 plays, 75 yards, 8:04.
- ILL – Isaiah Williams 1-yard pass from Artur Sitkowski (James McCourt kick), 4:01. Fighting Illini 30–9. Drive: 3 plays, 47 yards, 1:10.
- NEB – Adrian Martinez 75-yard run (Connor Culp kick), 3:48. Fighting Illini 30–16. Drive: 1 play, 75 yards, 0:13.

Fourth quarter

- NEB – Oliver Martin 4-yard pass from Adrian Martinez (kick failed), 2:41. Fighting Illini 30–22. Drive: 19 plays, 91 yards, 6:42.

Statistics	NEB	ILL
First downs	19	18
Total yards	392	326
Rushes–yards	39–160	48–167
Passing yards	232	159
Passing: Comp–Att–Int	16–32–0	15–19–0
Time of possession	25:05	34:55

Team	Category	Player	Statistics
Nebraska	Passing	Adrian Martinez	16/32, 232 yards, TD
Nebraska	Rushing	Adrian Martinez	17 rushes, 111 yards, TD
Nebraska	Receiving	Oliver Martin	6 receptions, 103 yards, TD
Illinois	Passing	Artur Sitkowski	12/15, 124 yards, 2 TD
Illinois	Rushing	Mike Epstein	16 rushes, 75 yards, TD
Illinois	Receiving	Deuce Spann	1 reception, 45 yards

=== UTSA ===
UTSA Roadrunners at Illinois Fighting Illini – Game summary

Quarter	1	2	3	4	Total
Roadrunners	7	13	3	14	37
Fighting Illini	0	14	3	13	30

at Memorial Stadium, Champaign, Illinois

- Date: September 4
- Game time: 6:30 p.m. CDT
- Game weather: Cloudy, 73 °F (23 °C)
- Game attendance: 33,906
- Referee: Greg Blum
- TV announcers (BTN): Lisa Byington, Anthony Herron, and Coley Harvey
- Box score, Recap

Game information
First quarter
- UTSA – Frank Harris 9-yard run (Hunter Duplessis kick), 1:32. Roadrunners 7–0. Drive: 13 plays, 94 yards, 4:40.

Second quarter

- UTSA – Brendan Brady 7-yard run (Hunter Duplessis kick), 11:31. Roadrunners 14–0. Drive: 9 plays, 61 yards, 3:43.
- ILL – Deuce Span 31-yard pass from Artur Sitkowski (James McCourt kick), 9:21. Roadrunners 14–7. Drive: 5 plays, 65 yards, 2:10.
- UTSA – Hunter Duplessis 32-yard field goal, 6:24. Roadrunners 17–7. Drive: 9 plays, 60 yards, 2:57.
- ILL – Daniel Barker 14-yard pass from Artur Sitkowski (James McCourt kick), 2:46. Roadrunners 17–14. Drive: 8 plays, 75 yards, 3:38.
- UTSA – Hunter Duplessis 28-yard field goal, 0:47. Roadrunners 20–14. Drive: 5 plays, 15 yards, 1:01.

Third quarter

- ILL – James McCourt 52-yard field goal, 9:22. Roadrunners 20–17. Drive: 4 plays, -2 yards, 1:26.
- UTSA – Hunter Duplessis 27-yard field goal, 3:19. Roadrunners 23–17. Drive: 10 plays, 75 yards, 3:39.

Fourth quarter

- ILL – James McCourt 53-yard field goal, 14:15. Roadrunners 23–20. Drive: 8 plays, 30 yards, 4:04.
- UTSA – Zakhari Franklin 19-yard pass from Frank Harris (Hunter Duplessis kick), 12:37. Roadrunners 30–20. Drive: 5 plays, 75 yards, 1:38.
- ILL – Daniel Barker 15-yard pass from Artur Sitkowski (James McCourt kick), 9:56. Roadrunners 30–27. Drive: 6 plays, 75 yards, 2:41.
- UTSA – Brendan Brady 33-yard run (Hunter Duplessis kick), 4:57. Roadrunners 37–27. Drive: 10 plays, 75 yards, 4:59.
- ILL – James McCourt 32-yard field goal, 1:55. Roadrunners 37–30. Drive: 14 plays, 60 yards, 2:56.

Statistics	UTSA	ILL
First downs	26	24
Total yards	497	416
Rushes–yards	50–237	35–166
Passing yards	280	266
Passing: Comp–Att–Int	20–32–0	22–43–0
Time of possession	30:42	29:18

Team	Category	Player	Statistics
UTSA	Passing	Frank Harris	20/32, 280 yards, TD
UTSA	Rushing	Sincere McCormick	31 rushes, 117 yards
UTSA	Receiving	Zakhari Franklin	10 receptions, 155 yards, TD
Illinois	Passing	Artur Sitkowski	22/42, 266 yards, 3 TD
Illinois	Rushing	Reggie Love III	11 rushes, 39 yards
Illinois	Receiving	Isaiah Williams	8 receptions, 101 yards

=== Virginia ===
Illinois Fighting Illini at Virginia Cavaliers – Game summary

Quarter	1	2	3	4	Total
Fighting Illini	0	7	7	0	14
Cavaliers	14	7	14	7	42

at Scott Stadium, Charlottesville, Virginia

- Date: September 11
- Game time: 10:00 a.m. CDT/11:00 a.m. EDT
- Game weather: Sunny
- Game attendance: 36,036
- Referee: Jeffrey Servinski
- TV: ACCN
- Box score, Recap

Game information
First quarter
- UVA – Jelani Woods 32-yard pass from Brennan Armstrong (Justin Duenkel kick), 13:44. Cavaliers 7–0. Drive: 4 plays, 75 yards, 1:16.
- UVA – Dontayvion Wicks 28-yard pass from Brennan Armstrong (Justin Duenkel kick), 10:04. Cavaliers 14–0. Drive: 4 plays, 80 yards, 1:37.

Second quarter

- ILL – Deuce Spann 33-yard pass from Artur Sitkowski (James McCourt kick), 11:09. Cavaliers 14–7. Drive: 8 plays, 72 yards, 4:19.
- UVA – Dontayvion Wicks 6-yard pass from Brennan Armstrong (Justin Duenkel kick), 1:17. Cavaliers 21–7. Drive: 7 plays, 62 yards, 2:41.

Third quarter

- ILL – Chase Brown 21–yard run (James McCourt kick), 12:59. Cavaliers 21–14. Drive: 4 plays, 75 yards, 2:01.
- UVA – Billy Kemp IV 2-yard pass from Brennan Armstrong (Justin Duenkel kick), 9:04. Cavaliers 28–14. Drive: 9 plays, 75 yards, 3:55.
- UVA – Keytaon Thompson 8-yard run (Justin Duenkel kick), 4:06. Cavaliers 35–14. Drive: 9 plays, 74 yards, 3:50.

Fourth quarter

- UVA – Wayne Taulapapa 3-yard pass from Brennan Armstrong (Justin Duenkel kick), 6:02. Cavaliers 42–14. Drive: 5 plays, 46 yards, 2:44.

Statistics	ILL	UVA
First downs	20	31
Total yards	337	556
Rushes–yards	27–116	33–133
Passing yards	221	423
Passing: Comp–Att–Int	24–45–1	28–40–1
Time of possession	27:52	31:19

Team	Category	Player	Statistics
Illinois	Passing	Artur Sitkowski	24/45, 221 yards, TD, INT
Illinois	Rushing	Chase Brown	7 rushes, 41 yards, TD
Illinois	Receiving	Dalevon Campbell	2 receptions, 43 yards
Virginia	Passing	Brennan Armstrong	27/36, 405 yards, 5 TD, INT
Virginia	Rushing	Wayne Taulapapa	10 rushes, 35 yards
Virginia	Receiving	Jelani Woods	5 receptions, 122 yards, TD

=== Maryland ===
Illinois Fighting Illini (1–2) vs. Maryland Terrapins (2–0)

Quarter	1	2	3	4	Total
Maryland	0	3	7	10	20
Illinois	0	3	7	7	17

at Memorial Stadium • Champaign, IL

- Date: Saturday, September 17, 2021
- Game time: 9:00 p.m. EDT
- Game weather: sunny • Temperature: 75°F
- Game attendance: 37,168
- Referee: Ron Snodgrass
- TV: FS1

Game information

Second Quarter

- (10:43) UMD – Joseph Petrino 32 yard field goal (Drive: 11 plays, 66 yards, 5:07; UMD 3-0)
- (1:27) ILL – James McCourt 25-yard field goal (Drive: 10 plays, 73 yards, 2:16; Tied 3-3)

Third Quarter

- (13:11) UMD – Tayon Fleet-Davis 2-yard run, Joseph Petrino kick (Drive: 5 plays, 75 yards, 1:49; UMD 10-3)
- (6:15) ILL – Josh McCray 38-yard run, James McCourt kick (Drive: 8 plays, 93 yards, 3:37; Tied 10-10)

Fourth Quarter

- (14:13) ILL – Casey Washington 30-yard run, James McCourt kick (Drive: 3 plays, 79 yards, 1:05; ILL 17-10)
- (13:11) UMD – Tayon Fleet-Davis 10-yard pass from Taulia Tagovailoa, Joseph Petrino kick (Drive: 8 plays, 86 yards, 2:37 Tie 17-17)
- (00:00) UMD – Joseph Petrino 32-yard field goal (Drive: 3 plays, 32 yards, 00:47; UMD 20-17)

Statistics	UMD	ILL
First downs	25	19
Total yards	481	368
Rushes/yards	27/131	45/183
Passing yards	350	185
Passing: Comp–Att–Int	32-43-0	10–26–1
Time of possession	29:09	30:51

Team	Category	Player	Statistics
Maryland	Passing	Taulia Tagovailoa	32–43, 350 yards, 1 TD
Maryland	Rushing	Tayon Fleet-Davis	11 carries, 64 yards, 1 TD
Maryland	Receiving	Dontay Demus Jr.	8 receptions, 77 yards
Illinois	Passing	Brandon Peters	10–26, 185 yards, 1 INT
Illinois	Rushing	Reggie Love III	10 carries, 63 yards
Illinois	Receiving	Chase Brown	2 receptions, 54 yards

=== Purdue ===
Illinois Fighting Illini at Purdue Boilermakers – Game summary

Quarter	1	2	3	4	Total
Fighting Illini	0	3	3	3	9
Boilermakers	6	0	0	7	13

at Ross–Ade Stadium, West Lafayette, Indiana

- Date: September 25
- Game time: 2:30 p.m. CDT
- Game weather: Sunny
- Game attendance: 52,840
- Referee: John O'Neill
- TV: BTN
- Box score, Recap

Game information
First quarter
- PUR – Mitchell Fineran 23-yard field goal, 8:31. Boilermakers 3–0. Drive: 15 plays, 69 yards, 6:29.
- PUR – Mitchell Fineran 30-yard field goal, 3:34. Boilermakers 6–0. Drive: 6 plays, 34 yards, 2:57.

Second quarter

- ILL – James McCourt 51-yard field goal, 2:24. Boilermakers 6–3. Drive: 7 plays, 29 yards, 3:40.

Third quarter

- ILL – James McCourt 35-yard field goal, 8:18. Tied 6–6. Drive: 13 plays, 58 yards, 6:42.

Fourth quarter

- ILL – James McCourt 45-yard field goal, 14:51. Fighting Illini 9–6. Drive: 6 plays, 53 yards, 1:39.
- PUR – TJ Sheffield 14-yard pass from Aidan O'Connell (Mitchell Fineran kick), 5:44. Boilermakers 13–9. Drive: 10 plays, 94 yards, 3:42.

Statistics	ILL	PUR
First downs	17	17
Total yards	275	315
Rushes–yards	42–175	26–38
Passing yards	100	277
Passing: Comp–Att–Int	14–27–0	24–40–2
Time of possession	33:45	26:15

Team	Category	Player	Statistics
Illinois	Passing	Brandon Peters	14/26, 100 yards
Illinois	Rushing	Josh McCray	24 rushes, 156 yards
Illinois	Receiving	Casey Washington	3 receptions, 31 yards
Purdue	Passing	Aidan O'Connell	12/19, 182 yards, TD, 2 INT
Purdue	Rushing	Dylan Downing	10 rushes, 39 yards
Purdue	Receiving	Milton Wright	7 receptions, 88 yards

=== Charlotte ===
Charlotte vs Illinois

Team	1	2	3	4	Total
49ers	7	7	0	0	14
• Fighting Illini	3	7	14	0	24

- Date: October 2
- Location: Memorial Stadium (Champaign)
  Champaign, IL
- Game start: 11:01 p.m. CDT
- Elapsed time: 3:02
- Game attendance: 30,559
- Game weather: 73 °F (23 °C) • Weather: Cloudy • Wind: SE 5 MPH
- Referee: Reggie Smith
- TV announcers (BTN): Chris Vosters, Stanley Jackson, Krystle Rich

Scoring summary
1	7:28	ILLI	James MCCOURT 29 Yd Field Goal	ILLI 3-0
1	1:31	CHAR	Victor TUCKER 22 Yd pass from Chris REYNOLDS (Jonathan CRUZ Kick)	CHAR 7-3
2	2:52	ILLI	Daniel BARKER 10 Yd pass from Brandon PETERS (James MCCOURT Kick)	ILLI 10-7
2	0:46	CHAR	Elijah SPENCER 27 Yd pass from Chris REYNOLDS (Jonathan CRUZ Kick)	CHAR 14-10
3	6:52	ILLI	Chase BROWN 31 Yd Run (James MCCOURT Kick)	ILLI 17-14
3	0:00	ILLI	Chase BROWN 80 Yd Run (James MCCOURT Kick)	ILLI 24-14

=== Wisconsin ===
Wisconsin vs Illinois – Game summary

Quarter	1	2	3	4	Total
Badgers	3	7	14	0	24
Fighting Illini	0	0	0	0	0

at Memorial Stadium, Champaign, Illinois

- Date: October 9, 2021
- Game time: 2:30 p.m.
- Game weather: 84 °F (29 °C); Sunny; Wind at n/a MPH
- Game attendance: 40,168
- Referee: Mark Kluczynski
- TV announcers (BTN): Mark Followill (play-by-play) and Matt Millen (analyst)

Game information

First quarter

- WISC – Collin Larsh 25-yard field goal, 4:14. Wisconsin 3–0. Drive: 18 plays, 67 yards, 9:44.

Second quarter

- WISC – John Chenal 1-yard TD run, (Collin Larsh kick), 5:27. Wisconsin 10–0. Drive: 14 plays, 79 yards, 6:50.

Third quarter

- WISC – Chez Mellusi 15-yard TD run, (Collin Larsh kick), 8:38. Wisconsin 17–0. Drive: 13 plays, 75 yards, 6:22.
- WISC – Braelon Allen 23-yard TD run, (Collin Larsh kick), 1:00. Wisconsin 24–0. Drive: 5 plays, 86 yards, 2:45.

Fourth quarter

No scoring

Top passers

- ILL – Artur Sitkowski – 8/27, 55 yards
- WISC – Graham Mertz – 10/19, 100 yards, INT

Top rushers

- ILL – Chase Brown – 8 rushes, 35 yards
- WISC – Chez Mellusi – 21 rushes, 145 yards, TD

Top receivers

- ILL – Isaiah Williams – 4 receptions, 23 yards
- WISC – Kendric Pryor – 2 receptions, 47 yards

Top defenders

- ILL – Tarique Barnes – 12 tackles, forced fumble, QB hurry, pass breakup
- WISC – Noah Burks – 6 tackles, 1.5 TFL, 0.5 sack, 3 QB hurries

=== At. No. 7 Penn State ===
Illinois Fighting Illini at No. 7 Penn State Nittany Lions – Game summary

Quarter	1	2	3	4	OT	2OT	3OT	4OT	5OT	6OT	7OT	8OT	9OT	Total
Fighting Illini	0	7	0	3	3	3	0	0	0	0	0	2	2	20
No. 7 Nittany Lions	7	3	0	0	3	3	0	0	0	0	0	2	0	18

at Beaver Stadium, University Park, Pennsylvania

- Date: October 23
- Game time: 11:00 a.m. CDT/12:00 p.m. EDT
- Game weather: Rain, 48 °F (9 °C)
- Game attendance: 105,001
- Referee: Reggie Smith
- TV announcers (ABC): Bob Wischusen, Dan Orlovsky, and Kris Budden
- Box score, Recap

Game information
First quarter
- PSU – KeAndre Lambert-Smith 42-yard pass from Sean Clifford (Jordan Stout kick), 0:09. Nittany Lions 7–0. Drive: 4 plays, 93 yards, 1:55.

Second quarter

- PSU – Jordan Stout 35-yard field goal, 11:12. Nittany Lions 10–0. Drive: 6 plays, 23 yards, 1:41.
- ILL – Chase Brown 1-yard run (James McCourt kick), 2:52. Nittany Lions 10–7. Drive: 15 plays, 75 yards, 8:20.

Third quarter

- No scoring plays

Fourth quarter

- ILL – James McCourt 37-yard field goal, 11:49. Tied 10–10. Drive: 16 plays, 70 yards, 7:33.

Overtime

- PSU – Jordan Stout 31-yard field goal. Nittany Lions 13–10. Drive: 8 plays, 12 yards.
- ILL – James McCourt 39-yard field goal. Tied 13–13. Drive: 4 plays, 4 yards.

Second overtime

- ILL – James McCourt 22-yard field goal. Fighting Illini 16–13. Drive: 7 plays, 21 yards.
- PSU – Jordan Stout 40-yard field goal. Tied 16–16. Drive: 4 plays, 3 yards.

Eighth overtime

- ILL – Isaiah Williams 2-point pass from Brandon Peters. Fighting Illini 18–16.
- PSU – Noah Cain 2-point run. Tied 18–18.

Ninth overtime

- ILL – Casey Washington 2-point pass from Brandon Peters. Fighting Illini 20–18.

Statistics	ILL	PSU
First downs	27	14
Total yards	395	227
Rushes–yards	67–357	29–62
Passing yards	38	165
Passing: Comp–Att–Int	8–21–1	19–34–0
Time of possession	36:25	23:35

Team	Category	Player	Statistics
Illinois	Passing	Artur Sitkowski	8/19, 38 yards, INT
Illinois	Rushing	Chase Brown	33 rushes, 223 yards, TD
Illinois	Receiving	Donny Navarro III	2 receptions, 12 yards
Penn State	Passing	Sean Clifford	19/34, 164 yards, TD
Penn State	Rushing	Noah Cain	11 rushes, 43 yards
Penn State	Receiving	Jahan Dotson	6 receptions, 69 yards

=== Rutgers ===
	1	2	3	4	Total
Scarlet Knights	7	3	0	10	20
Fighting Illini	0	14	0	0	14

=== No. 20 Minnesota ===
	1	2	3	4	Total
Fighting Illini	7	7	0	0	14
No. 20 Golden Gophers	0	0	0	6	6

=== No. 17 Iowa ===
Illinois at Iowa

Team	1	2	3	4	Total
Fighting Illini	10	3	3	7	23
• No. 17 Hawkeyes	7	10	3	13	33

- Date: November 20
- Location:
  Kinnick Stadium
  Iowa City, IA
- Game start: 1:10 p.m. CST
- Elapsed time: 3:31
- Game attendance: 64,132
- Referee: Larry Smith
- TV announcers (FS1): Adam Alexander (play-by-play) and Devin Gardner (analyst)
- Source: Box Score

Scoring summary
1	8:37	Illinois	L. Ford 13-yard pass from Brandon Peters (James McCourt kick)	Illinois 7–0
1	3:20	Illinois	James McCourt 46-yard field goal	Illinois 10–0
1	3:05	Iowa	Charlie Jones 100-yard kickoff return (Caleb Shudak kick)	Illinois 10–7
2	14:08	Iowa	Arland Bruce IV 2-yard run (Caleb Shudak kick)	Iowa 14–10
2	6:41	Iowa	Caleb Shudak 51-yard field goal	Iowa 17–10
2	3:13	Illinois	James McCourt 45-yard field goal	Iowa 17–13
3	9:12	Iowa	Caleb Shudak 48-yard field goal	Iowa 20–13
3	2:46	Illinois	James McCourt 53-yard field goal	Iowa 20–16
4	9:12	Iowa	Caleb Shudak 48-yard field goal	Iowa 23–16
4	9:12	Iowa	Caleb Shudak 48-yard field goal	Iowa 26–16
4	1:36	Iowa	Jack Campbell 32-yard interception return (Caleb Shudak kick)	Iowa 33–16
4	0:31	Iowa	Isaiah Williams 16-yard pass from Brandon Peters (James McCourt kick)	Iowa 33–23

Statistics	ILL	IOWA
First downs	11	18
Total yards	312	255
Rushing yards	64	172
Passing yards	248	83
Turnovers	2	1
Time of possession	25:42	34:18

Team	Category	Player	Statistics
Illinois	Passing	Brandon Peters	16/36, 248 yards, 2 TD, 2 INT
Illinois	Rushing	Chase Brown	13 carries, 42 yards
Illinois	Receiving	Casey Washington	3 receptions, 61 yards
Iowa	Passing	Alex Padilla	6/17, 83 yards, INT
Iowa	Rushing	Tyler Goodson	27 carries, 132 yards
Iowa	Receiving	Arland Bruce IV	2 receptions, 45 yards

=== Northwestern ===
	1	2	3	4	Total
Wildcats	0	7	0	7	14
Fighting Illini	14	23	3	7	47
