= Over–under =

Type of wager at a sportsbook

An over–under or over/under (O/U) bet is a wager in which a sportsbook will predict a number for a statistic in a given game and bettors wager that the actual number in the game will be either higher or lower than that number. One of the most commonly used statistics is the combined total score of the two teams, and for this reason the wager is also known as the total.

For example, in Super Bowl XXXIX, most Las Vegas casinos set the over–under for the score of the game at 46.0. A bettor could wager that the combined score of the two teams would be either more than or less than that number. Since the combined score of that game was 45, anyone who had bet on "under" won. The bet is called a push if the actual number exactly equals the over–under, in which case all bets are refunded.

== Dice ==
A variant of over–under betting, known as Under Over, is a dice game played at various festivals. The object of the game is to predict whether the dice will roll to a total of under 7, over 7, or at 7. The game is typically played with 2 dice.

A player typically places a wager on one of three spaces. These spaces are:

- Under 7 (usually pays 1–1)
- Over 7 (usually pays 1–1)
- 7 (usually pays 4–1)

For instance, if one bets one dollar on under and the dealer rolls under, they gain a dollar as well as get their dollar back. If one bets on a seven and the dealer rolls a seven, they make four dollars. Once all the bets have been placed the attendant closes the betting board with a screen and then puts the dice through the chute. Players then get paid accordingly.

One variation of Under Over involves foam dice, two of which are thrown in the middle of the players; in another variation, two balls are thrown into a giant wheel consisting of twelve spaces of numbers ranging from 1–6. No wire fence is used to block the bets in that case.
