= Casey Washington =

American football player (born 2001)

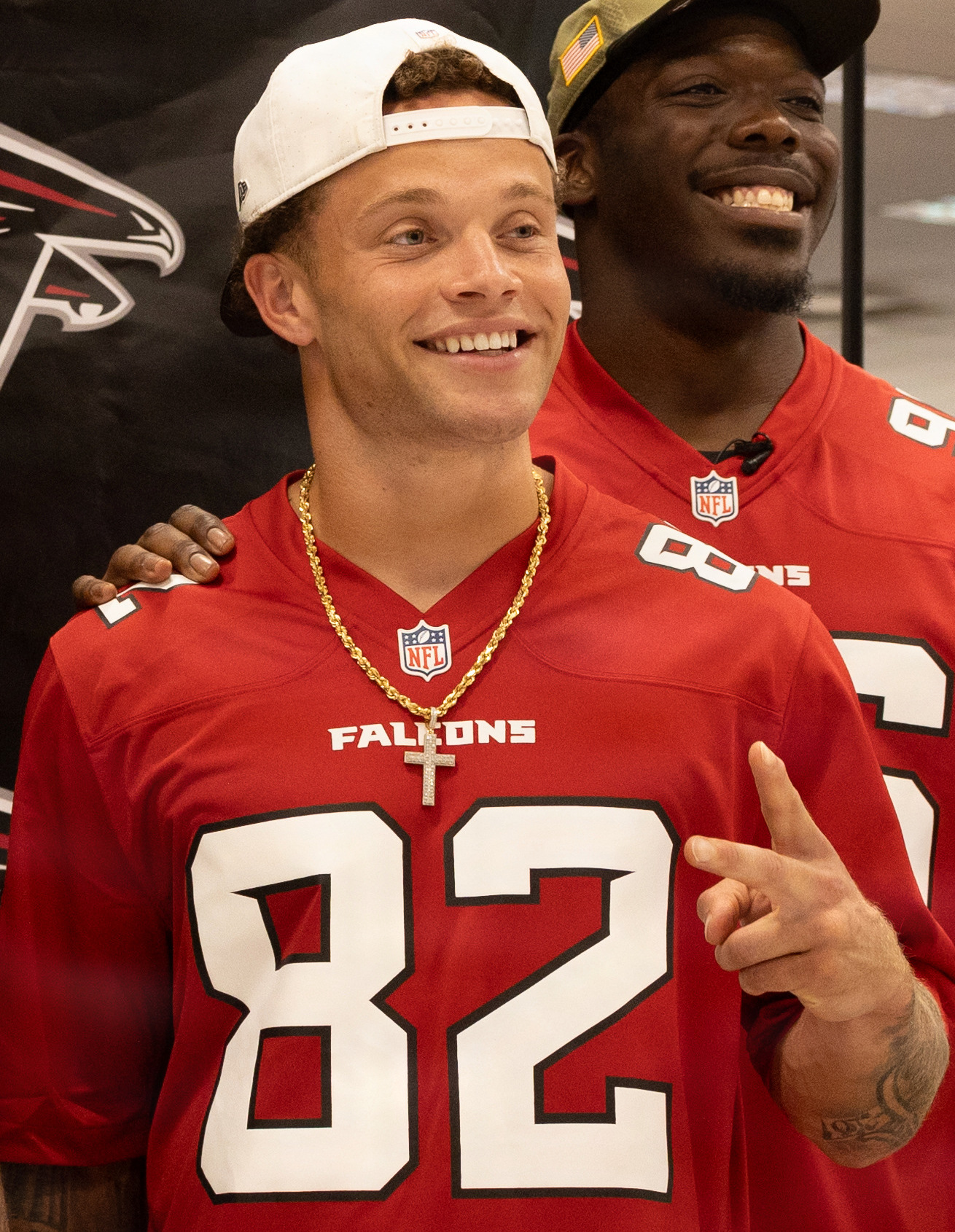
- Washington in 2026

No. 85 – Carolina Panthers
- Position: Wide receiver
- Roster status: Practice squad

Personal information
- Born: March 6, 2001 (age 25); Round Rock, Texas, U.S.
- Listed height: 6 ft 0 in (1.83 m)
- Listed weight: 205 lb (93 kg)

Career information
- High school: Pflugerville (Pflugerville, Texas)
- College: Illinois (2019–2023)
- NFL draft: 2024: 6th round, 187th overall pick

Career history
- Atlanta Falcons (2024–2025); Carolina Panthers (2026–present)*
- * Offseason or practice squad member only

Career NFL statistics as of 2025
- Receptions: 7
- Receiving yards: 108
- Stats at Pro Football Reference

Casey Washington (born March 6, 2001) is an American professional football wide receiver for the Carolina Panthers of the National Football League (NFL). He played college football for the Illinois Fighting Illini and was selected by the Atlanta Falcons in the sixth round of the 2024 NFL draft.

== Early life ==
The son of a former football player for the Kansas State Wildcats, Washington was born on March 6, 2001, and grew up in Round Rock, Texas. He attended Pflugerville High School where he played football as a wide receiver and totaled 42 receptions for 565 yards and five touchdowns as a senior. He was ranked a three-star recruit and committed to play college football for the Illinois Fighting Illini.

== College career ==
Washington appeared in 10 games, five as a starter, as a true freshman at Illinois in 2019, posting 11 receptions for 132 yards. He then had 10 catches for 106 yards in 2020. He entered the NCAA transfer portal and transferred to the Wake Forest Demon Deacons in 2021, but had second thoughts during spring practice and re-entered the transfer portal, returning to Illinois and being granted an eligibility waiver by the NCAA. He ended the 2021 season with 21 catches for 294 yards. During the season, he caught the game-winning two-point conversion in the team's 20–18 nine-overtime win over the Penn State Nittany Lions, which set a record for most overtimes; Washington's gloves from the game were put on display in the College Football Hall of Fame.

In 2022, Washington played 13 games, three as a starter, and had 31 catches for 306 yards. He had his best year as a senior in 2023, recording 49 catches for 670 yards and four touchdowns. He ended his collegiate career having appeared in 55 games while totaling 122 receptions for 1,508 yards and four touchdowns. He was invited to the East–West Shrine Bowl.

== Professional career ==
Pre-draft measurables
Height	Weight	Arm length	Hand span	Wingspan	40-yard dash	10-yard split	20-yard split	20-yard shuttle	Three-cone drill	Vertical jump	Broad jump	Bench press
6 ft 0 7/8 in (1.85 m)	201 lb (91 kg)	31 3/4 in (0.81 m)	9 5/8 in (0.24 m)	6 ft 4 1/4 in (1.94 m)	4.46 s	1.57 s	2.60 s	4.43 s	7.39 s	39.5 in (1.00 m)	10 ft 7 in (3.23 m)	13 reps
All values from Pro Day

=== Atlanta Falcons ===
Washington impressed at his pro day, posting a 4.46-second 40-yard dash. He was selected in the sixth round (187th overall) of the 2024 NFL draft by the Atlanta Falcons. On October 20, Washington recorded his first NFL reception in the fourth quarter of the Falcons' blowout loss to the Seattle Seahawks, hauling in a 14-yard pass from Michael Penix Jr.

On June 17, 2026, Washington was released by the Falcons.

=== Carolina Panthers ===
On July 29, 2026, Washington signed with the Carolina Panthers. Washington was waived by the Panthers on August 30 as a part of final roster cuts; he was re–signed to the team's practice squad the next day.

== NFL career statistics ==
Legend
**Bold**	Career high

=== Regular season ===
Year	Team	Games		Receiving					Rushing					Fumbles	
Year	Team	GP	GS	Rec	Yds	Avg	Lng	TD	Att	Yds	Avg	Lng	TD	Fum	Lost
2024	ATL	8	0	1	14	14.0	14	0	0	0	0.0	0	0	0	0
2025	ATL	7	2	**6**	**94**	**15.7**	**25**	0	0	0	0.0	0	0	0	0
Career		15	2	7	108	15.4	25	0	0	0	0.0	0	0	0	0
