= UTEP Miners football statistical leaders =

The UTEP Miners football statistical leaders are individual statistical leaders of the UTEP Miners football program in various categories, including passing, rushing, receiving, total offense, defensive stats, and kicking. Within those areas, the lists identify single-game, single-season, and career leaders. As of the upcoming 2026 season, the Miners represent the University of Texas at El Paso in the NCAA Division I FBS Mountain West Conference.

Although UTEP began competing in intercollegiate football in 1914, the school's official record book considers the "modern era" to have begun in 1937. Records from before this year are often incomplete and inconsistent, and they are generally not included in these lists.

These lists are dominated by more recent players for several reasons:

- Since 1937, seasons have increased from 10 games to 11 and then 12 games in length.
- The NCAA didn't allow freshmen to play varsity football until 1972 (with the exception of the World War II years), allowing players to have four-year careers.
- Bowl games only began counting toward single-season and career statistics in 2002. The Miners have played in four bowl games since this decision, giving many recent players an extra game to accumulate statistics.

These lists are updated through the end of the 2025 season.

== Passing ==
=== Passing yards ===
Career
Rk	Player	Yards	Years
1	Trevor Vittatoe	12,439	2007 2008 2009 2010
2	Jordan Palmer	11,084	2003 2004 2005 2006
3	Gavin Hardison	7,963	2019 2020 2021 2022 2023
4	Billy Stevens	6,485	1965 1966 1967
5	Sammy Garza	6,130	1983 1984 1985 1986
6	Rocky Perez	5,108	1997 1998 1999 2000
7	Pat Hegarty	4,593	1987 1988
8	John Rayborn	4,194	1995 1997 1998
9	Mike Perez	4,144	1990 1991 1992 1993
10	Bill Craigo	3,807	1969 1970 1971

Single season
Rk	Player	Yards	Year
1	Jordan Palmer	3,595	2006
2	Jordan Palmer	3,503	2005
3	Trevor Vittatoe	3,308	2009
4	Trevor Vittatoe	3,274	2008
5	Gavin Hardison	3,218	2021
6	Sammy Garza	3,140	1986
7	Trevor Vittatoe	3,101	2007
8	Billy Stevens	3,032	1965
9	Jordan Palmer	2,818	2004
10	Trevor Vittatoe	2,756	2010

Single game
Rk	Player	Yards	Year	Opponent
1	Trevor Vittatoe	517	2009	Marshall
2	Bill Craigo	507	1970	Colorado State
3	Billy Stevens	500	1965	North Texas
4	Sammy Garza	458	1986	Northern Michigan
5	Jordan Palmer	455	2006	UAB
6	Jordan Palmer	431	2005	Memphis
7	Brooks Dawson	426	1967	New Mexico State
8	Trevor Vittatoe	419	2009	UAB
9	Jordan Palmer	414	2006	New Mexico State
10	Trevor Vittatoe	410	2008	SMU

=== Passing touchdowns ===
Career
Rk	Player	TDs	Years
1	Trevor Vittatoe	97	2007 2008 2009 2010
2	Jordan Palmer	88	2003 2004 2005 2006
3	Billy Stevens	51	1965 1966 1967
4	Gavin Hardison	40	2019 2020 2021 2022 2023
5	Sammy Garza	35	1983 1984 1985 1986
6	Brooks Dawson	34	1966 1967 1968
7	Rocky Perez	33	1997 1998 1999 2000
8	John Rayborn	32	1995 1997 1998
9	Pat Hegarty	30	1987 1988
10	John Furman	24	1958 1959 1960 1961
	Nick Lamaison	24	2011 2012

Single season
Rk	Player	TDs	Year
1	Trevor Vittatoe	33	2008
2	Jordan Palmer	29	2005
3	Rocky Perez	26	2000
	Jordan Palmer	26	2004
	Jordan Palmer	26	2006
6	Trevor Vittatoe	25	2007
7	Trevor Vittatoe	22	2010
8	Billy Stevens	21	1965
	Sammy Garza	21	1986
10	Billy Stevens	19	1966

Single game
Rk	Player	TDs	Year	Opponent
1	Sammy Garza	7	1986	Northern Michigan
2	Billy Stevens	6	1967	BYU
	Brooks Dawson	6	1967	New Mexico
4	Bob Laraba	5	1957	Arizona
	Billy Stevens	5	1965	New Mexico
	Billy Stevens	5	1966	Texas-Arlington
	Howard Gasser	5	1989	Utah
	John Rayborn	5	1995	Air Force
	Jordan Palmer	5	2006	UAB
	Trevor Vittatoe	5	2007	Rice
	Trevor Vittatoe	5	2008	Louisiana-Lafayette
	Trevor Vittatoe	5	2009	Marshall
	Trevor Vittatoe	5	2010	New Mexico State
	Jameill Showers	5	2013	Colorado State

== Rushing ==
=== Rushing yards ===
Career
Rk	Player	Yards	Years
1	Aaron Jones	4,114	2013 2014 2015 2016
2	John Harvey	3,576	1985 1986 1987 1988
3	Howard Jackson	3,466	2001 2002 2003 2004
4	Robert Elliott	2,834	1974 1975 1976 1977
5	Toraino Singleton	2,635	1994 1995
6	Marcus Thomas	2,615	2004 2005 2006 2007
7	Deion Hankins	2,604	2019 2020 2021 2022 2023
8	Paul Smith	2,539	1996 1997 1998 1999
9	Donald Buckram	2,417	2006 2007 2008 2009 2010
10	Pug Gabrel	2,321	1947 1948 1949 1950

Single season
Rk	Player	Yards	Year
1	Aaron Jones	1,773	2016
2	Donald Buckram	1,594	2009
3	Fred Wendt	1,546	1948
4	Toraino Singleton	1,358	1995
5	Aaron Jones	1,321	2014
6	Toraino Singleton	1,277	1994
7	Paul Smith	1,258	1999
8	Howard Jackson	1,187	2004
9	John Harvey	1,170	1987
10	Marcus Thomas	1,166	2007

Single game
Rk	Player	Yards	Year	Opponent
1	Fred Wendt	326	1948	New Mexico State
2	Aaron Jones	301	2016	North Texas
3	Donald Buckram	262	2009	Houston
4	Aaron Jones	249	2016	New Mexico State
5	Donald Buckram	241	2009	SMU
6	Joe Banyard	240	2011	Houston
7	Toraino Singleton	237	1995	Valdosta State
8	Aaron Jones	237	2014	New Mexico
9	Donald Buckram	234	2009	Tulane
10	John Harvey	232	1985	Colorado State

=== Rushing touchdowns ===
Career
Rk	Player	TDs	Years
1	John Harvey	42	1985 1986 1987 1988
2	Aaron Jones	33	2013 2014 2015 2016
3	Pug Gabrel	27	1947 1948 1949 1950
4	Marcus Thomas	26	2004 2005 2006 2007
5	Howard Jackson	25	2001 2002 2003 2004
6	Fred Wendt	23	1942 1946 1947 1948
	Deion Hankins	23	2019 2020 2021 2022 2023
8	Owen Price	21	1938 1940 1941
	Donald Buckram	21	2006 2007 2008 2009 2010
10	Ken Heineman	19	1937 1938 1939 1940
	Clovis Riley	19	1951 1952 1953
	Toraino Singleton	19	1994 1995

Single season
Rk	Player	TDs	Year
1	Fred Wendt	20	1948
2	Donald Buckram	18	2009
3	Aaron Jones	17	2016
4	John Harvey	16	1987
	Marcus Thomas	16	2007
6	Paul Smith	12	1999
	Treyvon Hughes	12	2019
8	Owen Price	11	1941
	Pug Gabrel	11	1949
	John Harvey	11	1986
	Toraino Singleton	11	1994
	Aaron Jones	11	2014

Single game
Rk	Player	TDs	Year	Opponent
1	Fred Wendt	6	1948	New Mexico State
2	Fred Wendt	4	1948	BYU
	Jack Burris	4	1952	Hawaii
	John Harvey	4	1988	Weber State
	Howard Jackson	4	2002	Sacramento State
	Donald Buckram	4	2009	Houston
	Aaron Jones	4	2016	North Texas

== Receiving ==
=== Receptions ===
Career
Rk	Player	Rec	Years
1	Lee Mays	200	1998 1999 2000 2001
2	Johnnie Lee Higgins	190	2003 2004 2005 2006
3	Brian Natkin	172	1997 1998 1999 2000
4	Jeff Moturi	170	2006 2007 2008 2009
5	Chuck Hughes	162	1964 1965 1966
6	Reggie Barrett	153	1987 1988 1989 1990
7	Kris Adams	144	2007 2008 2009 2010
8	Jacob Cowing	141	2019 2020 2021
9	Ed Puishes	138	1969 1970 1971
10	Chris Francies	128	2002 2003 2004 2005
	Justin Garrett	128	2019 2020 2021

Single season
Rk	Player	Rec	Year
1	Johnnie Lee Higgins	82	2006
2	Chuck Hughes	80	1965
3	Tyrin Smith	71	2022
4	Lee Mays	70	2000
5	Jacob Cowing	69	2021
6	Jeff Moturi	65	2007
7	Brian Natkin	64	2000
8	Kenny Odom	62	2025
9	Lee Mays	60	1999
10	Brian Natkin	59	1999

Single game
Rk	Player	Rec	Year	Opponent
1	Chuck Hughes	17	1965	Arizona State
2	Johnnie Lee Higgins	13	2006	Texas Tech
3	Chuck Hughes	12	1965	Colorado State
	Ed Puishes	12	1970	Trinity (Texas)
	Greg Taylor	12	1972	Lamar
	Harold Johnson	12	1978	San Diego State
	Ricki Lopez	12	1990	Air Force
	Jeff Moturi	12	2007	East Carolina
	Trey Goodman	12	2024	Kennesaw State
	Jaden Smith	12	2026	San Jose State

=== Receiving yards ===
Career
Rk	Player	Yards	Years
1	Johnnie Lee Higgins	3,218	2003 2004 2005 2006
2	Lee Mays	2,908	1998 1999 2000 2001
3	Chuck Hughes	2,882	1964 1965 1966
4	Kris Adams	2,657	2007 2008 2009 2010
5	Jacob Cowing	2,595	2019 2020 2021
6	Reggie Barrett	2,558	1987 1988 1989 1990
7	Jeff Moturi	2,527	2006 2007 2008 2009
8	Ed Puishes	2,234	1969 1970 1971
9	Bob Wallace	2,161	1965 1966 1967
10	Chris Francies	2,022	2002 2003 2004 2005

Single season
Rk	Player	Yards	Year
1	Chuck Hughes	1,519	1965
2	Jacob Cowing	1,354	2021
3	Johnnie Lee Higgins	1,319	2006
4	Lee Mays	1,098	2000
5	Kris Adams	1,070	2010
6	Reggie Barrett	1,042	1989
7	Tyrin Smith	1,039	2022
8	Kelly Akharaiyi	1,033	2023
9	Ed Puishes	1,000	1970
10	Jeff Moturi	974	2009

Single game
Rk	Player	Yards	Year	Opponent
1	Chuck Hughes	349	1965	North Texas
2	Chuck Hughes	254	1965	Arizona State
3	Volley Murphy	234	1967	New Mexico
4	Bob Wallace	233	1967	New Mexico State
5	Johnnie Lee Higgins	223	2006	New Mexico State
	Kelly Akharaiyi	223	2023	Florida International
7	Jordan Leslie	218	2012	Tulsa
8	Arnie Adkison	200	1987	Utah
9	Ed Puishes	198	1970	Colorado State
10	Greg Taylor	197	1972	Lamar

=== Receiving touchdowns ===
Career
Rk	Player	TDs	Years
1	Johnnie Lee Higgins	32	2003 2004 2005 2006
2	Kris Adams	30	2007 2008 2009 2010
3	Lee Mays	28	1998 1999 2000 2001
4	Jeff Moturi	26	2006 2007 2008 2009
5	Chuck Hughes	19	1964 1965 1966
	Bob Wallace	19	1965 1966 1967
	Volley Murphy	19	1967 1968
	Reggie Barrett	19	1987 1988 1989 1990
9	Jordan Leslie	15	2011 2012 2013
10	David Karns	14	1966 1967 1968
	Cedric Johnson	14	1993 1994 1995 1996
	Kenny Odom	14	2024 2025

Single season
Rk	Player	TDs	Year
1	Lee Mays	15	2000
2	Kris Adams	14	2008
	Kris Adams	14	2010
4	Johnnie Lee Higgins	13	2006
	Jeff Moturi	13	2007
6	Chuck Hughes	12	1965
	Volley Murphy	12	1967
8	David Karns	10	1966
	Reggie Barrett	10	1989
	Johnnie Lee Higgins	10	2004

Single game
Rk	Player	TDs	Year	Opponent
1	Volley Murphy	4	1967	BYU

== Total offense ==
Total offense is the sum of passing and rushing statistics. It does not include receiving or returns.

=== Total offense yards ===
Career
Rk	Player	Yards	Years
1	Trevor Vittatoe	12,291	2007 2008 2009 2010
2	Jordan Palmer	11,041	2003 2004 2005 2006
3	Gavin Hardison	7,948	2019 2020 2021 2022 2023
4	Sammy Garza	6,056	1983 1984 1985 1986
5	Billy Stevens	5,696	1965 1966 1967
6	Rocky Perez	5,394	1997 1998 1999 2000
7	Ken Heineman	4,874	1937 1938 1939 1940
8	Shawn Gray	4,822	1991 1992 1993 1994
9	Pat Hegarty	4,522	1987 1988
10	John Rayborn	4,494	1995 1997 1998

Single season
Rk	Player	Yards	Year
1	Jordan Palmer	3,509	2006
2	Jordan Palmer	3,453	2005
3	Trevor Vittatoe	3,243	2008
4	Trevor Vittatoe	3,225	2009
5	Gavin Hardison	3,173	2021
6	Sammy Garza	3,002	1986
7	Trevor Vittatoe	2,969	2007
8	Trevor Vittatoe	2,854	2010
9	Jordan Palmer	2,801	2004
10	Rocky Perez	2,743	2000

Single game
Rk	Player	Yards	Year	Opponent
1	Trevor Vittatoe	517	2009	Marshall
2	Bill Craigo	485	1970	Colorado State
3	Billy Stevens	483	1965	North Texas
4	Sammy Garza	474	1986	Northern Michigan
5	Kai Locksley	461	2019	New Mexico State
6	Jordan Palmer	425	2005	Memphis
7	Brooks Dawson	424	1967	New Mexico State
8	Sammy Garza	420	1986	Utah
9	Jordan Palmer	416	2006	New Mexico State
10	Trevor Vittatoe	412	2008	SMU

=== Total touchdowns ===
Career
Rk	Player	TDs	Years
1	Trevor Vittatoe	98	2007 2008 2009 2010
2	Jordan Palmer	95	2003 2004 2005 2006
3	Billy Stevens	56	1965 1966 1967
4	Sammy Garza	47	1983 1984 1985 1986
5	Rocky Perez	46	1997 1998 1999 2000
6	Gavin Hardison	43	2019 2020 2021 2022 2023
7	John Harvey	42	1985 1986 1987 1988
8	John Rayborn	40	1995 1997 1998
9	Brooks Dawson	37	1966 1967 1968
10	Pat Hegarty	34	1987 1988
	Aaron Jones	34	2013 2014 2015 2016

Single season
Rk	Player	TDs	Year
1	Trevor Vittatoe	34	2008
2	Rocky Perez	32	2000
3	Jordan Palmer	31	2005
4	Jordan Palmer	27	2004
5	Jordan Palmer	27	2006
6	Trevor Vittatoe	25	2007
7	Sammy Garza	24	1986
8	Billy Stevens	22	1965
9	Trevor Vittatoe	22	2010
10	Billy Stevens	21	1966
	Skyler Locklear	21	2025

== Defense ==
=== Interceptions ===
Career
Rk	Player	Ints	Years
1	Charlie West	19	1965 1966 1967
2	Quintin Demps	17	2004 2005 2006 2007
3	D. J. Walker	16	1999 2000 2001 2002
4	Terry Walker	14	1985 1986 1987 1988
5	Ken Heineman	13	1937 1938 1939
	Owen Price	13	1938 1940 1941
7	Ron Bostwick	13	1962 1963 1964 1965
8	Grady Cavness	11	1966 1967 1968

Single season
Rk	Player	Ints	Year
1	Charlie West	11	1966
2	Ken Heineman	8	1939
	Owen Price	8	1941
4	Ron Bostwick	7	1965
	Eddie Forkerway	7	1978
	Quintin Demps	7	2006
7	Del Williams	6	1960
	Bernard Chapman	6	1971

Single game
Rk	Player	Ints	Year	Opponent
1	Charlie West	4	1966	West Texas State
2	Ken Heineman	3	1939	Arizona
	Mike Maros	3	1939	Wichita State
	Gerald Campbell	3	1950	New Mexico
	Ron Bostwick	3	1965	West Texas State
	Danny Taylor	3	1985	BYU
	Ken Sale	3	1989	San Diego State

=== Tackles ===
Career
Rk	Player	Tackles	Years
1	Barron Wortham	566	1990 1991 1992 1993
2	Doug Morgan	523	1986 1987 1988 1989
3	Tony Perea	459	1970 1971 1972
4	Raymond Morris	458	1980 1981 1982 1983
5	Robert Rodriguez	443	2001 2002 2003 2004
6	Micheal Comer	437	1993 1994 1995 1996
7	Fred Carr	410	1965 1966 1967
8	Hal Barnett	407	1974 1975 1976
9	Tyrice Knight	392	2020 2021 2022 2023
10	Pete Shufelt	385	1989 1990 1991 1992 1993

Single season
Rk	Player	Tackles	Year
1	Tony Perea	192	1971
2	Hal Barnett	185	1975
3	Don Croft	156	1971
4	Micheal Comer	152	1995
5	Barron Wortham	151	1993
6	Ken Sale	150	1989
7	Seth Joyner	149	1985
8	Fred Carr	148	1967
	Fred Williams	148	1986
	Barron Wortham	148	1991

=== Sacks ===
Career
Rk	Player	Sacks	Years
1	Praise Amaewhule	22.5	2018 2019 2020 2021 2022 2023
2	Gonzalo Floyd	20.0	1990 1991 1993
3	Chris Mineo	16.5	2002 2003 2004 2005
4	Herman Whiting	16.0	1979 1980 1981 1982
	Jadrian Taylor	16.0	2020 2021 2022
6	Melvin Besses	15.0	1979 1980 1981
	Maurice Westmoreland	15.0	2023 2024
8	Brian Young	14.5	1995 1997 1998 1999
9	Alex Obomese	14.0	2003 2004 2005 2006
10	Thomas Howard	13.0	2002 2003 2004 2005
	Justin Hanel	13.0	2003 2004 2005 2006

Single season
Rk	Player	Sacks	Year
1	Melvin Besses	11.0	1979
2	Menson Holloway	10.5	2000
3	Ricky Massey	10.0	1991
4	Jadrian Taylor	9.5	2022
5	Brian Young	8.0	1999
	Thomas Howard	8.0	2004
	Chris Mineo	8.0	2004
	Cal Wallerstedt	8.0	2022
9	Maurice Westmoreland	7.5	2023
	Maurice Westmoreland	7.5	2024

== Kicking ==
=== Field goals made ===
Career
Rk	Player	FGs	Years
1	Gavin Baechle	58	2019 2020 2021 2022
2	Reagan Schneider	50	2003 2004 2005 2006
3	Ricky Bishop	42	1997 1998 1999 2000
4	Jay Mattox	40	2013 2014 2015 2016
5	Hugo Castellanos	38	1984 1985 1986 1987
6	Jose Martinez	37	2007 2008
7	Scott Wedell	35	1980 1981 1982 1983
	Marshall Young	35	1992 1993 1994 1995
9	Chris Jacke	30	1984 1985 1986 1988
10	Miguel Alvarez	28	1975 1976 1977

Single season
Rk	Player	FGs	Year
1	Chris Jacke	25	1988
2	Gavin Baechle	22	2022
3	Jose Martinez	20	2008
4	Reagan Schneider	18	2005
	Gavin Baechle	18	2021
5	Jose Martinez	17	2007
6	Reagan Schneider	16	2006
7	Scott Wedell	15	1983
	Ricky Bishop	15	1998
	Reagan Schneider	15	2004
	Jay Mattox	15	2015

Single game
Rk	Player	FGs	Year	Opponent
1	Reagan Schneider	5	2005	Houston
	Jose Martinez	5	2007	East Carolina
	Jose Martinez	5	2008	SMU

=== Field goal percentage ===
Career
Rk	Player	FG%	Years
1	Chris Jacke	85.7%	1984 1985 1986 1988
2	Gavin Baechle	79.5%	2019 2020 2021 2022
3	Jose Martinez	78.7%	2007 2008
4	Reagan Schneider	74.6%	2003 2004 2005 2006
5	Hugo Castellanos	74.5%	1984 1985 1986 1987
6	Ricky Bishop	72.4%	1997 1998 1999 2000
7	Jay Mattox	70.2%	2013 2014 2015 2016
8	Marshall Young	68.6%	1992 1993 1994 1995
9	Buzz Flabiano	64.5%	2023 2024
10	Scott Wedell	62.5%	1980 1981 1982 1983

Single season
Rk	Player	FG%	Year
1	Chris Jacke	92.6%	1988
2	Gavin Baechle	91.7%	2022
3	Jose Martinez	85.0%	2007
4	Marshall Young	84.6%	1993
5	Jay Mattox	81.3%	2014
	Gavin Baechle	81.3%	2019
7	Reagan Schneider	80.0%	2006
8	Jay Mattox	78.9%	2015
9	Hugo Castellanos	78.6%	1984
10	Reagan Schneider	78.3%	2005
