= 1995 BYU Cougars football team =

American college football season

1995 BYU Cougars football

WAC co-champion
- Conference: Western Athletic Conference
- Record: 7–4 (6–2 WAC)
- Head coach: LaVell Edwards (24th season)
- Offensive coordinator: Roger French (15th season)
- Offensive scheme: West Coast
- Defensive coordinator: Ken Schmidt (5th season)
- Base defense: 4–3
- Home stadium: Cougar Stadium

1995 Western Athletic Conference football standings
	Conf.			Overall
Team	W		L	W		L
Colorado State +	6	–	2	8	–	4
BYU +	6	–	2	7	–	4
Utah +	6	–	2	7	–	4
Air Force +	6	–	2	8	–	5
San Diego State	5	–	3	8	–	4
Wyoming	4	–	4	6	–	5
Fresno State	2	–	6	5	–	7
New Mexico	2	–	6	4	–	7
Hawaii	2	–	6	4	–	8
UTEP	1	–	7	2	–	10
+ – Conference co-champions

The 1995 BYU Cougars football team represented Brigham Young University (BYU) in the 1995 NCAA Division I-A football season.

== Schedule ==
Date	Opponent	Site	TV	Result	Attendance
September 2	at Air Force	Falcon Stadium; Colorado Springs, CO		L 12–38	
September 9	No. 12 UCLA*	Cougar Stadium; Provo, UT	ABC	L 9–23	60,379
September 16	San Diego State	Cougar Stadium; Provo, UT	ESPN	W 31–19	57,221
September 30	at Colorado State	Hughes Stadium; Fort Collins, CO		W 28–21	36,650
October 14	at Arizona State*	Sun Devil Stadium; Tempe, AZ	PSN	L 21–29	51,035
October 21	Wyoming	Cougar Stadium; Provo, UT		W 23–20	
October 28	Hawaii	Cougar Stadium; Provo, UT		W 45–7	64,680
November 4	Tulsa*	Cougar Stadium; Provo, UT		W 45–35	63,754
November 11	at New Mexico	University Stadium; Albuquerque, NM		W 31–14	
November 18	Utah	Cougar Stadium; Provo, UT (Holy War)	ABC	L 17–34	65,829
November 25	at Fresno State	Bulldog Stadium; Fresno, CA		W 45–28	33,719
*Non-conference game; Rankings from AP Poll released prior to the game

== Roster ==
1995 BYU Cougars football team roster
Players
Coaches
Offense

Pos.	#	Name	Class
TE	96	Chad Lewis	Jr
WR	80	Kaipo McGuire	Jr
TE	88	Itula Mili	Jr
QB	12	Steve Sarkisian	Jr
C	71	Morris Unutoa	Sr
RG	67	Jason Andersen	So

Defense

Pos.	#	Name	Class
LB	46	Shay Muirbrook (C)	Jr

Special teams

Pos.	#	Name	Class

Head coach

- LaVell Edwards

Coordinators/assistant coaches

Legend

- (C) Team captain
- (S) Suspended
- (I) Ineligible
- Injured
- Redshirt

Roster
