= 1987 Colorado State Rams football team =

American college football season

1987 Colorado State Rams football
- Conference: Western Athletic Conference
- Record: 1–11 (1–7 WAC)
- Head coach: Leon Fuller (6th season)
- Offensive coordinator: Kay Dalton (1st season)
- Defensive coordinator: Harold Richardson (1st season)
- Home stadium: Hughes Stadium

1987 Western Athletic Conference football standings
	Conf.					Overall
Team	W		L		T	W		L		T
Wyoming $	8	–	0	–	0	10	–	3	–	0
BYU	7	–	1	–	0	9	–	4	–	0
Air Force	6	–	2	–	0	9	–	4	–	0
UTEP	5	–	3	–	0	7	–	4	–	0
San Diego State	4	–	4	–	0	5	–	7	–	0
Hawaii	3	–	5	–	0	5	–	7	–	0
Utah	2	–	6	–	0	5	–	7	–	0
Colorado State	1	–	7	–	0	1	–	11	–	0
New Mexico	0	–	8	–	0	0	–	11	–	0
$ – Conference champion

The 1987 Colorado State Rams football team represented Colorado State University in the Western Athletic Conference during the 1987 NCAA Division I-A football season. In their sixth season under head coach Leon Fuller, the Rams compiled a 1–11 record.

== Schedule ==
Date	Opponent	Site	Result	Attendance	Source
September 5	at No. 17 Tennessee*	Neyland Stadium; Knoxville, TN	L 3–49	92,921	
September 12	at Texas Tech*	Jones Stadium; Lubbock, TX	L 24–33	28,786	
September 19	UTEP	Hughes Stadium; Fort Collins, CO	L 6–45	21,472	
September 26	Air Force	Hughes Stadium; Fort Collins, CO (rivalry)	L 19–27	23,137	
October 3	Colorado*	Hughes Stadium; Fort Collins, CO (rivalry)	L 16–29	38,129	
October 10	Utah	Hughes Stadium; Fort Collins, CO	L 23–24	10,450	
October 17	New Mexico	Hughes Stadium; Fort Collins, CO	W 35–13	24,555	
October 31	at Wyoming	War Memorial Stadium; Laramie, WY (rivalry)	L 15–20	27,146	
November 7	at Hawaii	Aloha Stadium; Halawa, HI	L 38–39	32,744	
November 14	at San Diego State	Jack Murphy Stadium; San Diego, CA	L 12–26	17,382	
November 21	at Southwestern Louisiana*	Cajun Field; Lafayette, LA	L 28–35	14,031	
December 4	vs. BYU	Princes Park; Melbourne, Australia (Melbourne Bowl)	L 26–30	7,652	
*Non-conference game; Rankings from Coaches' Poll released prior to the game
