= 1995 New Mexico Lobos football team =

American college football season

1995 New Mexico Lobos football
- Conference: Western Athletic Conference
- Record: 4–7 (2–6 WAC)
- Head coach: Dennis Franchione (4th season)
- Offensive coordinator: Dennis Darnell (2nd season)
- Offensive scheme: Multiple
- Defensive coordinator: Fred Bleil (4th season)
- Base defense: 4–3
- Home stadium: University Stadium

1995 Western Athletic Conference football standings
	Conf.			Overall
Team	W		L	W		L
Colorado State +	6	–	2	8	–	4
BYU +	6	–	2	7	–	4
Utah +	6	–	2	7	–	4
Air Force +	6	–	2	8	–	5
San Diego State	5	–	3	8	–	4
Wyoming	4	–	4	6	–	5
Fresno State	2	–	6	5	–	7
New Mexico	2	–	6	4	–	7
Hawaii	2	–	6	4	–	8
UTEP	1	–	7	2	–	10
+ – Conference co-champions

The 1995 New Mexico Lobos football team was an American football team that represented the University of New Mexico in the Western Athletic Conference (WAC) during the 1995 NCAA Division I-A football season. In their fourth season under head coach Dennis Franchione, the Lobos compiled a 4–7 record (2–6 against WAC opponents) and were outscored by a total of 303 to 256.

The team's statistical leaders included Donald Sellers with 1,693 passing yards, Winslow Oliver with 915 rushing yards, Steve Pagador with 492 receiving yards, and kicker Colby Cason with 58 points scored.

== Schedule ==
Date	Time	Opponent	Site	TV	Result	Attendance
September 2		Northern Arizona*	University Stadium; Albuquerque, NM		W 45–21	
September 16	6:00 p.m.	Utah	University Stadium; Albuquerque, NM		L 9–36	26,113
September 23		New Mexico State*	University Stadium; Albuquerque, NM (rivalry)		W 36–24	
September 30		Air Force^{†}	University Stadium; Albuquerque, NM		L 24–27	
October 7		at Fresno State	Bulldog Stadium; Fresno, CA		L 34–51	33,544
October 14		Hawaii	University Stadium; Albuquerque, NM		W 24–10	25,201
October 21		at Colorado State	Hughes Stadium; Fort Collins, CO		W 22–14	28,901
October 28	1:00 p.m.	No. 22 Texas Tech*	University Stadium; Albuquerque, NM	KUPT	L 7–34	25,088
November 4		at San Diego State	Jack Murphy Stadium; San Diego, CA		L 29–38	25,119
November 11		BYU	University Stadium; Albuquerque, NM		L 14–31	
November 18		at UTEP	Sun Bowl; El Paso, TX		L 12–17	13,837
*Non-conference game; ^{†}Homecoming; Rankings from AP Poll released prior to the game; All times are in Mountain time
