= 1987 San Diego State Aztecs football team =

American college football season

1987 San Diego State Aztecs football
- Conference: Western Athletic Conference
- Record: 5–7 (4–4 WAC)
- Head coach: Denny Stolz (2nd season)
- Offensive coordinator: Dana Bible (2nd season)
- Offensive scheme: Pro-style
- Defensive coordinator: Tim McConnell (2nd season)
- Base defense: 4–3
- Home stadium: Jack Murphy Stadium

1987 Western Athletic Conference football standings
	Conf.					Overall
Team	W		L		T	W		L		T
Wyoming $	8	–	0	–	0	10	–	3	–	0
BYU	7	–	1	–	0	9	–	4	–	0
Air Force	6	–	2	–	0	9	–	4	–	0
UTEP	5	–	3	–	0	7	–	4	–	0
San Diego State	4	–	4	–	0	5	–	7	–	0
Hawaii	3	–	5	–	0	5	–	7	–	0
Utah	2	–	6	–	0	5	–	7	–	0
Colorado State	1	–	7	–	0	1	–	11	–	0
New Mexico	0	–	8	–	0	0	–	11	–	0
$ – Conference champion

The 1987 San Diego State Aztecs football team represented San Diego State University as a member of the Western Athletic Conference (WAC) during the 1987 NCAA Division I-A football season. Led by second-year head coach Denny Stolz, the Aztecs compiled an overall record of 5–7 with a mark of 4–4 conference play, placing fifth in the WAC. The team played home games at Jack Murphy Stadium in San Diego.

== Schedule ==
Date	Opponent	Site	TV	Result	Attendance	Source
September 5	at No. 3 UCLA*	Rose Bowl; Pasadena, CA		L 14–47	54,287	
September 12	Utah	Jack Murphy Stadium; San Diego, CA		W 52–34	28,645	
September 19	at Air Force	Falcon Stadium; Colorado Springs, CO		L 7–49	35,035	
September 26	at Oregon*	Autzen Stadium; Eugene, OR		L 20–25	31,573	
October 3	at Wyoming	War Memorial Stadium; Laramie, WY		L 10–52	25,018	
October 10	UTEP	Jack Murphy Stadium; San Diego, CA		L 33–34	20,744	
October 17	Stanford*	Jack Murphy Stadium; San Diego, CA		L 40–44	25,676	
October 24	Long Beach State*^{†}	Jack Murphy Stadium; San Diego, CA		W 52–42	23,625	
October 31	at Hawaii	Aloha Stadium; Halawa, HI		W 29–21	41,437	
November 7	at BYU	Cougar Stadium; Provo, UT		L 21–38	64,341	
November 14	Colorado State	Jack Murphy Stadium; San Diego, CA		W 25–12	17,382	
November 21	New Mexico	Jack Murphy Stadium; San Diego, CA	KGSW	W 53–30	21,392	
*Non-conference game; ^{†}Homecoming; Rankings from AP Poll released prior to the game

== Team players in the NFL ==
The following were selected in the 1988 NFL draft.

Player	Position	Round	Overall	NFL team
Harold Hicks	Defensive back	7	193	Washington Redskins
Clarence Nunn	Defensive back	9	246	New Orleans Saints
Todd Santos	Quarterback	10	274	New Orleans Saints
Wayne Ross	Punter	12	315	Washington Redskins
Dave DesRochers	Tackle	12	326	Seattle Seahawks

The following finished their college career in 1987, were not drafted, but played in the NFL.

Player	Position	First NFL team
Brett Faryniarz	Linebacker	1988 Los Angeles Rams

== Team awards ==
Award	Player
Most Valuable Player (John Simcox Memorial Trophy)	Todd Santos
Outstanding Offensive & Defensive Linemen (Byron H. Chase Memorial Trophy)	Dave DesRochers, Off; Brett Faryniarz, Def
Team captains Dr. R. Hardy / C.E. Peterson Memorial Trophy	Todd Santos, Off; Reggie Blaylock, Off; Brett Faryniarz, Def
Most Inspirational Player	Reggie Blaylock
