= 1995 Colorado State Rams football team =

American college football season

1995 Colorado State Rams football
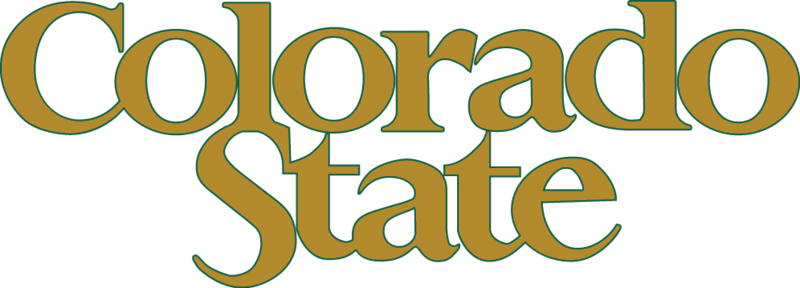

WAC co-champion

Holiday Bowl, L 21–54 vs. Kansas State
- Conference: Western Athletic Conference
- Record: 8–4 (6–2 WAC)
- Head coach: Sonny Lubick (3rd season)
- Offensive coordinator: Dave Lay (5th season)
- Defensive coordinator: Larry Kerr (3rd season)
- Home stadium: Hughes Stadium

1995 Western Athletic Conference football standings
	Conf.			Overall
Team	W		L	W		L
Colorado State +	6	–	2	8	–	4
BYU +	6	–	2	7	–	4
Utah +	6	–	2	7	–	4
Air Force +	6	–	2	8	–	5
San Diego State	5	–	3	8	–	4
Wyoming	4	–	4	6	–	5
Fresno State	2	–	6	5	–	7
New Mexico	2	–	6	4	–	7
Hawaii	2	–	6	4	–	8
UTEP	1	–	7	2	–	10
+ – Conference co-champions

The 1995 Colorado State Rams football team represented Colorado State University in the 1995 NCAA Division I-A football season. The Rams were led by third-year head coach Sonny Lubick and played their home games at Hughes Stadium in Fort Collins, Colorado. They competed as members of the Western Athletic Conference, finishing in a four-way tie for first with Air Force, BYU, and Utah. It was Colorado State's second consecutive conference title. The Rams were invited to the 1995 Holiday Bowl, where they were defeated by Kansas State.

== Schedule ==
Date	Time	Opponent	Site	TV	Result	Attendance
September 2		Montana State*	Hughes Stadium; Fort Collins, CO		W 31–10	27,068
September 9	7:45 p.m.	at No. 10 Colorado*	Folsom Field; Boulder, CO (Rocky Mountain Showdown)	ESPN	L 14–42	52,848
September 16		at No. 21 Air Force	Falcon Stadium; Colorado Springs, CO (rivalry)		W 27–20	45,578
September 30		BYU	Hughes Stadium; Fort Collins, CO		L 21–28	36,650
October 7		at Utah State*	Romney Stadium; Logan, UT		W 59–17	16,071
October 14	12:00 p.m.	at Utah	Robert Rice Stadium; Salt Lake City, UT		W 19–14	27,691
October 21		New Mexico	Hughes Stadium; Fort Collins, CO		L 14–22	28,901
October 28		at Wyoming	War Memorial Stadium; Laramie, WY (Border War)		W 31–24	28,245
November 4		UTEP	Hughes Stadium; Fort Collins, CO		W 56–10	22,013
November 11		Hawaii	Hughes Stadium; Fort Collins, CO		W 22–0	25,235
November 25		at San Diego State	Jack Murphy Stadium; San Diego, CA		W 24–13	41,603
December 29	7:00 p.m.	vs. No. 10 Kansas State*	Jack Murphy Stadium; San Diego, CA (Holiday Bowl)	ESPN	L 21–54	51,051
*Non-conference game; Rankings from AP Poll released prior to the game; All times are in Mountain time
