= 1987 Wyoming Cowboys football team =

American college football season

1987 Wyoming Cowboys football

WAC champion

Holiday Bowl, L 19–20 vs. Iowa
- Conference: Western Athletic Conference
- Record: 10–3 (8–0 WAC)
- Head coach: Paul Roach (1st season)
- Offensive coordinator: Joe Tiller (1st season)
- Home stadium: War Memorial Stadium

1987 Western Athletic Conference football standings
	Conf.					Overall
Team	W		L		T	W		L		T
Wyoming $	8	–	0	–	0	10	–	3	–	0
BYU	7	–	1	–	0	9	–	4	–	0
Air Force	6	–	2	–	0	9	–	4	–	0
UTEP	5	–	3	–	0	7	–	4	–	0
San Diego State	4	–	4	–	0	5	–	7	–	0
Hawaii	3	–	5	–	0	5	–	7	–	0
Utah	2	–	6	–	0	5	–	7	–	0
Colorado State	1	–	7	–	0	1	–	11	–	0
New Mexico	0	–	8	–	0	0	–	11	–	0
$ – Conference champion

The 1987 Wyoming Cowboys football team represented the University of Wyoming in the 1987 NCAA Division I-A football season. It was the Cowboys' 92nd season and they competed as a member of the Western Athletic Conference (WAC). Led by first-year head coach Paul Roach, the Cowboys compiled a 10–2 record (8–0 against conference opponents), finishing first in the WAC. The team played their home games on campus at War Memorial Stadium in Laramie, Wyoming, and outscored their opponents 426 to 271. As WAC Champions against Iowa in the Holiday Bowl, Wyoming lost by a point to finish at 10–3.

Roach was hired as the athletic director at Wyoming in July 1986. When head coach Dennis Erickson left abruptly after just one season for Washington State in January 1987, Roach selected himself as successor a few days later. The two teams met in the second game of the season.

== Schedule ==
Date	Opponent	Site	TV	Result	Attendance	Source
September 5	Air Force	War Memorial Stadium; Laramie, WY		W 27–13	28,071	
September 12	at Washington State*	Martin Stadium; Pullman, WA		L 28–43	24,151	
September 19	Oklahoma State*	War Memorial Stadium; Laramie, WY		L 29–35	20,852	
September 26	Iowa State*	War Memorial Stadium; Laramie, WY		W 34–17	18,386	
October 3	San Diego State	War Memorial Stadium; Laramie, WY		W 52–10	25,018	
October 10	at BYU	Cougar Stadium; Provo, UT		W 29–27	65,921	
October 17	Houston*	War Memorial Stadium; Laramie, WY		W 37–35	18,011	
October 31	Colorado State	War Memorial Stadium; Laramie, WY (rivalry)		W 20–15	27,146	
November 7	at New Mexico	University Stadium; Albuquerque, NM		W 59–16	13,244	
November 14	at Utah	Robert Rice Stadium; Salt Lake City, UT		W 31–7	23,510	
November 21	at UTEP	Sun Bowl; El Paso, TX		W 37–13	29,865	
November 28	at Hawaii	Aloha Stadium; Halawa, HI (rivalry)		W 24–20	39,690	
December 30	vs. Iowa	Jack Murphy Stadium; San Diego, CA (Holiday Bowl)	ESPN	L 19–20	61,892	
*Non-conference game

== Roster ==
1987 Wyoming Cowboys football team roster
Players
Coaches
Offense

Pos.	#	Name	Class
WR	3	Melvin Wells	Jr
QB	14	Brad Quiring	Jr
QB	19	Craig Burnett	Sr
TE, P	16	Tom Kilpatrick	Jr
OT	79	John Walsh	Jr

Defense

Pos.	#	Name	Class
SS	17	Mike Hill	Sr
CB	23	Eric Coleman	Jr
DB	31	Jim Pennington	Fr
LB	49	Mitch Donahue	Fr
LB	44	Scott Hanser	Sr
DT	80	Jeff Knapton	Sr
DE	92	Craig Schlichting	So

Special teams

Pos.	#	Name	Class

Head coach

- Paul Roach

Coordinators/assistant coaches

Legend

- (C) Team captain
- (S) Suspended
- (I) Ineligible
- Injured
- Redshirt

== 1988 NFL draft ==
The following were selected in the 1988 NFL draft.

Player	Position	Round	Overall	NFL team
Jeff Knapton	Defensive tackle	6	165	Los Angeles Rams
