= Bob Wagner =

American football player and coach (1947–2023)

Biographical details
- Born: May 16, 1947; Newark, Ohio, U.S.
- Died: October 3, 2023 (aged 76); Hawaii, U.S.

Playing career
- 1965–1968: Wittenberg
- Position: Offensive tackle

Coaching career (HC unless noted)
- 1969–1970: Gallipolis HS (OH) (assistant)
- 1971: Warsaw River View HS (OH)
- 1972–1974: Muskingum (DC)
- 1975: Wooster (assistant)
- 1976: Washington (assistant)
- 1977–1982: Hawaii (assistant)
- 1983–1986: Hawaii (DC)
- 1987–1995: Hawaii
- 1998–2000: Arizona (assistant)
- 2001: UTEP (DC/LB)

Administrative career (AD unless noted)
- 2002–2012: Kea'au (HI) Kamehameha HS

Head coaching record
- Overall: 58–49–3 (college)
- Bowls: 1–1

Accomplishments and honors

Championships
- 1 WAC (1992)

Awards
- 2× WAC Coach of the Year (1989, 1992)

Robert C. Wagner (May 16, 1947 – October 3, 2023) was an American college football coach. He was the head football coach at the University of Hawaiʻi at Mānoa from 1988 to 1995, leading the Hawaii Rainbow Warriors to their first top 20 finish in 1992.

Wagner graduated from Wittenberg University in 1969. He started as an assistant coach at Gallipolis High School in Ohio in 1969. In 1971, he became head coach at River View High School in Warsaw, Ohio and led the team to its then-best season ever at 8–2. He left River View after one season to become defensive coordinator at Muskingum University. In 1975, Wagner became assistant coach at the College of Wooster, then became an assistant at the University of Washington under Don James in 1976.

Wagner became an assistant coach at Hawaii in 1977 under Larry Price, then was promoted to defensive coordinator under Dick Tomey in 1983. Wagner took over the head coaching position in 1987 when Tomey left to become head coach at Arizona. While head coach at Hawaii, Wagner led the Rainbow Warriors to their first WAC title in 1992. During most of Wagner's tenure at Hawaii, his offensive coordinator was Georgia Tech head coach Paul Johnson. Despite Wagner's overall success, he was let go after a 4–8 season in 1995, and replaced by former Bill Walsh assistant, Fred von Appen.

Wagner was out of coaching for a few years, but after the 1997 season ended, Wagner agreed to take over the defensive coordinator position for TCU under new coach Dennis Franchione. However, his old mentor Dick Tomey called, asking if he wanted to take over an assistant position on his staff. Wagner gladly accepted and ended up coaching inside linebackers for Arizona.

Wagner served as the athletic director for Kamehameha Schools-Hawaii on the Big Island for ten years, from 2002 to 2012.

Bob Wagner died at his residence in Hawaii on October 3, 2023, at the age of 76.

== Head coaching record ==
=== College ===
| Year | Team | Overall | Conference | Standing | Bowl/playoffs | Coaches^{#} | AP^{°} |
|---|---|---|---|---|---|---|---|
Hawaii Rainbow Warriors (Western Athletic Conference) (1987–1995)
| 1987 | Hawaii | 5–7 | 3–5 | 6th | | | |
| 1988 | Hawaii | 9–3 | 5–3 | T–3rd | | | |
| 1989 | Hawaii | 9–3–1 | 5–2–1 | 3rd | L Aloha | | |
| 1990 | Hawaii | 7–5 | 4–4 | 5th | | | |
| 1991 | Hawaii | 4–7–1 | 3–5 | 5th | | | |
| 1992 | Hawaii | 11–2 | 6–2 | T–1st | W Holiday | 20 | 20 |
| 1993 | Hawaii | 6–6 | 3–5 | 8th | | | |
| 1994 | Hawaii | 3–5–1 | 0–8 | 10th | | | |
| 1995 | Hawaii | 4–8 | 2–6 | T–7th | | | |
| Hawaii: | | 58–49–3 | 31–40–1 | | | | |
| Total: | | 58–49–3 | | | | | |
National championship Conference title Conference division title or championship game berth
^{#}Rankings from final Coaches Poll.; ^{°}Rankings from final AP Poll.
