= Ed Puishes =

Former American football wide receiver

Profile
- Position: Wide receiver

Personal information
- Born: October 5, 1950; Dearborn, Michigan, U.S.
- Died: January 25, 2019 (aged 68); Buchanan Dam, Texas, U.S.
- Listed height: 5 ft 11 in (1.80 m)
- Listed weight: 170 lb (77 kg)

Career information
- High school: Divine Child (Dearborn, MI)
- College: UTEP (1969–1971)

Career history
- El Paso Matadors

Edward Lawrence Puishes (October 5, 1950 – January 25, 2019) was an American football wide receiver. Born in 1950, he attended Divine Child High School in Dearborn, Michigan, where he received ten letters in sports. As a halfback at Divine Child, he was selected in 1967 as the Michigan High School Football Player of the Year and led Divine Child to the Detroit Catholic league championship. He played college football for the UTEP Miners from 1969 to 1971. He led the Western Athletic Conference in receptions with 55 in 1969 and ranked second in 1970 with 57. He also led the WAC, and ranked eighth nationally, in 1970 with 1,000 receiving yards. After his college career, he had a tryout with the New York Jets before returning to El Paso where he sold thread to clothing manufacturers. He also played minor league football for the El Paso Matadors. His brother Greg Puishes also played for the Matadors. Puishes was later the president of West Texas Textiles. He died in 2019.

== See also ==
- UTEP Miners football statistical leaders
