= 1995 Wyoming Cowboys football team =

American college football season

1995 Wyoming Cowboys football
- Conference: Western Athletic Conference
- Record: 6–5 (4–4 WAC)
- Head coach: Joe Tiller (5th season)
- Offensive coordinator: Larry Korpitz (5th season)
- Defensive coordinator: Brock Spack (1st season)
- Captains: Joe Cummings; Jeremy Gilstrap
- Home stadium: War Memorial Stadium

1995 Western Athletic Conference football standings
	Conf.			Overall
Team	W		L	W		L
Colorado State +	6	–	2	8	–	4
BYU +	6	–	2	7	–	4
Utah +	6	–	2	7	–	4
Air Force +	6	–	2	8	–	5
San Diego State	5	–	3	8	–	4
Wyoming	4	–	4	6	–	5
Fresno State	2	–	6	5	–	7
New Mexico	2	–	6	4	–	7
Hawaii	2	–	6	4	–	8
UTEP	1	–	7	2	–	10
+ – Conference co-champions

The 1995 Wyoming Cowboys football team represented the University of Wyoming as a member of the Western Athletic Conference (WAC) during the 1995 NCAA Division I-A football season. Led by fifth-year head coach Joe Tiller, the Cowboys compiled an overall record of 6–5 with a mark of 4–4 in conference play, placing sixth in the WAC. Wyoming played home games at War Memorial Stadium.

== Schedule ==
Date	Opponent	Site	Result	Attendance
September 9	at Air Force	Falcon Stadium; Colorado Springs, CO	L 10–34	37,315
September 16	Hawaii	War Memorial Stadium; Laramie, WY	W 52–6	21,631
September 23	Oklahoma State*	War Memorial Stadium; Laramie, WY	W 45–25	18,289
October 7	at Tulsa*	Skelly Field; Tulsa, OK	L 6–35	20,003
October 14	Louisville*	War Memorial Stadium; Laramie, WY	W 27–20	22,418
October 21	at BYU	Cougar Stadium; Provo, UT	L 20–23	
October 28	Colorado State	War Memorial Stadium; Laramie, WY (Border War)	L 24–31	28,245
November 4	Utah	War Memorial Stadium; Laramie, WY	L 24–30	12,562
November 11	at No. 25 San Diego State	Jack Murphy Stadium; San Diego, CA	W 34–31	32,848
November 18	Fresno State	War Memorial Stadium; Laramie, WY	W 38–10	13,661
November 25	at UTEP	Sun Bowl; El Paso, TX	W 42–19	31,383
*Non-conference game; Rankings from AP Poll released prior to the game
