= 1987 Air Force Falcons football team =

American college football season

1987 Air Force Falcons football
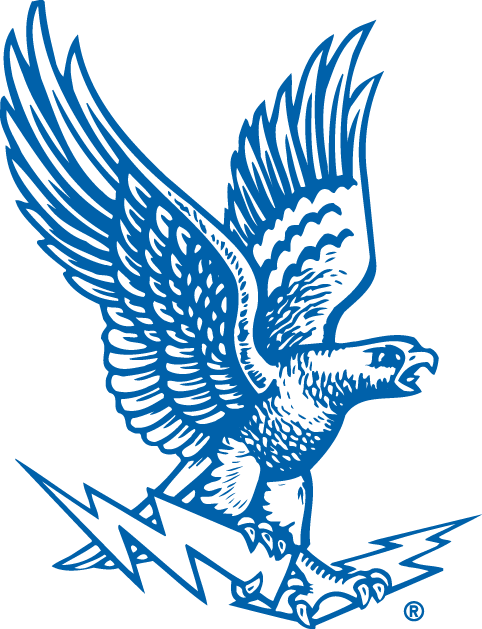

Freedom Bowl, L 28–33 vs. Arizona State
- Conference: Western Athletic Conference
- Record: 9–4 (6–2 WAC)
- Head coach: Fisher DeBerry (4th season)
- Offensive scheme: Wishbone triple option
- Captain: All seniors
- Home stadium: Falcon Stadium

1987 Western Athletic Conference football standings
	Conf.					Overall
Team	W		L		T	W		L		T
Wyoming $	8	–	0	–	0	10	–	3	–	0
BYU	7	–	1	–	0	9	–	4	–	0
Air Force	6	–	2	–	0	9	–	4	–	0
UTEP	5	–	3	–	0	7	–	4	–	0
San Diego State	4	–	4	–	0	5	–	7	–	0
Hawaii	3	–	5	–	0	5	–	7	–	0
Utah	2	–	6	–	0	5	–	7	–	0
Colorado State	1	–	7	–	0	1	–	11	–	0
New Mexico	0	–	8	–	0	0	–	11	–	0
$ – Conference champion

The 1987 Air Force Falcons football team represented the United States Air Force Academy in the 1987 NCAA Division I-A football season. The Falcons offense scored 405 points while the defense allowed 269 points. At season's end, the Falcons appeared in the 1987 Freedom Bowl. In the Ram–Falcon Trophy match, the Falcons beat the Colorado State Rams to win the trophy. Air Force also won the Commander-in-Chief's Trophy, emblematic of beating both Army and Navy.

== Schedule ==
Date	Opponent	Site	TV	Result	Attendance	Source
September 5	at Wyoming	War Memorial Stadium; Laramie, WY		L 13–27	28,071	
September 12	TCU*	Falcon Stadium; Colorado Springs, CO		W 21–10	41,000	
September 19	San Diego State	Falcon Stadium; Colorado Springs, CO		W 49–7	35,035	
September 26	at Colorado State	Hughes Stadium; Fort Collins, CO (rivalry)		W 27–19	23,137	
October 3	Utah	Falcon Stadium; Colorado Springs, CO		W 48–27	35,108	
October 10	at Navy*	Navy–Marine Corps Memorial Stadium; Annapolis, MD		W 23–13	35,622	
October 17	No. 11 Notre Dame*	Falcon Stadium; Colorado Springs, CO (rivalry)		L 14–35	51,112	
October 24	UTEP	Falcon Stadium; Colorado Springs, CO		W 35–7	36,922	
October 31	at BYU	Cougar Stadium; Provo, UT	ESPN	L 13–24	65,384	
November 7	Army*	Falcon Stadium; Colorado Springs, CO		W 27–10	49,183	
November 14	at New Mexico	University Stadium; Albuquerque, NM		W 73–26	15,309	
November 21	at Hawaii	Aloha Stadium; Halawa, HI (rivalry)	ESPN	W 34–31	43,340	
December 30	vs. Arizona State*	Anaheim Stadium; Anaheim, CA (Freedom Bowl)	Mizlou	L 28–33	33,261	
*Non-conference game; Rankings from AP Poll released prior to the game

== Game summaries ==
=== At BYU ===
Air Force Falcons (6–2) at BYU Cougars (4–3)

Quarter	1	2	3	4	Total
Air Force	10	0	3	0	13
BYU	0	14	10	0	24

at Cougar Stadium, Provo, Utah

- Date: October 31, 1987
- Game attendance: 65,384
- Box Score

Game information

First quarter

- AFA – Steve Yarborough 32-yard field goal. Air Force 3–0.
- AFA – Anthony Roberson 3-yard run (Steve Yarborough kick). Air Force 10–0.

Second quarter

- BYU – Mike O'Brien 3-yard run (Leonard Chitty kick). Air Force 10–7.
- BYU – Fred Whittingham 5-yard pass from Sean Covey (Leonard Chitty kick). BYU 14–10.

Third quarter

- BYU – Leonard Chitty 26-yard field goal. BYU 17–10.
- BYU – Mike O'Brien 2-yard run (Leonard Chitty kick). BYU 24–10.
- AFA – Steve Yarborough 32-yard field goal. BYU 24–13.

Fourth quarter

- No scoring

Top passers

- AFA – Dee Dowis – 2/7, 25 yards, 3 INT
- BYU – Sean Covey – 18/29, 294 yards, TD

Top rushers

- AFA – Quinton Roberts – 15 rushes, 85 yards
- BYU – Mike O'Brien – 16 rushes, 73 yards, 2 TD

Top receivers

- AFA – Tyler Barth – 1 reception, 13 yards
- BYU – Rich Zayas – 3 receptions, 118 yards

=== Army ===
Army Cadets (3–5) at Air Force Falcons (6–3)

Quarter	1	2	3	4	Total
Army	0	3	7	0	10
Air Force	7	7	7	6	27

at Falcon Stadium, Colorado Springs, Colorado

- Date: November 7, 1987
- Game attendance: 49,183

Air Force wins Commander-in-Chief Trophy

Team	Category	Player	Statistics
Army	Passing		
Army	Rushing		
Army	Receiving		
Air Force	Passing		
Air Force	Rushing	Dee Dowis	129 Yds, TD
Air Force	Receiving		

Scoring summary

Quarter	Time	Drive			Team	Scoring information	Score	
Quarter	Time	Plays	Yards	TOP	Team	Scoring information	ARMY	AFA
1		10	86		Air Force	Anthony Roberson 1-yard touchdown run, kick good	0	7
2	7:02				Army	32-yard field goal by Bit Rambusch	3	7
2	0:30	16	83		Air Force	Dee Dowis 3-yard touchdown run, kick good	3	14
3	7:25				Army	Mike Mayweather 46-yard touchdown reception from Tory Crawford, kick good	10	14
3	3:59				Air Force	Albert Booker 1-yard touchdown run, kick good	10	21
4					Air Force	Interception return 24 yards for touchdown by Kevin Hughes	10	27
"TOP" = time of possession. For other American football terms, see Glossary of American football.							10	27

== Roster ==
1987 Air Force Falcons football team roster
Players
Coaches
Offense

Pos.	#	Name	Class
QB		Troy Calhoun	Jr
QB		Dee Dowis	So

Defense

Pos.	#	Name	Class
DT	87	Chad Hennings	Sr

Special teams

Pos.	#	Name	Class

Head coach

- Fisher DeBerry

Coordinators/assistant coaches

Legend

- (C) Team captain
- (S) Suspended
- (I) Ineligible
- Injured
- Redshirt

== Awards and honors ==
- Rip Burgwald, Bullard Award
- Chad Hennings, Outland Trophy

== NFL draft ==
The following Falcon was selected in the 1988 NFL draft following the season.

Round	Pick	Player	Position	NFL team
11	290	Chad Hennings	Defensive tackle	Dallas Cowboys
