= 1987 Hawaii Rainbow Warriors football team =

American college football season

1987 Hawaii Rainbow Warriors football
- Conference: Western Athletic Conference
- Record: 5–7 (3–5 WAC)
- Head coach: Bob Wagner (1st season)
- Offensive coordinator: Paul Johnson (1st season)
- Offensive scheme: Triple option
- Defensive coordinator: Rich Ellerson (1st season)
- Base defense: 4–3
- Home stadium: Aloha Stadium

1987 Western Athletic Conference football standings
	Conf.					Overall
Team	W		L		T	W		L		T
Wyoming $	8	–	0	–	0	10	–	3	–	0
BYU	7	–	1	–	0	9	–	4	–	0
Air Force	6	–	2	–	0	9	–	4	–	0
UTEP	5	–	3	–	0	7	–	4	–	0
San Diego State	4	–	4	–	0	5	–	7	–	0
Hawaii	3	–	5	–	0	5	–	7	–	0
Utah	2	–	6	–	0	5	–	7	–	0
Colorado State	1	–	7	–	0	1	–	11	–	0
New Mexico	0	–	8	–	0	0	–	11	–	0
$ – Conference champion

The 1987 Hawaii Rainbow Warriors football team represented the University of Hawaiʻi at Mānoa in the Western Athletic Conference during the 1987 NCAA Division I-A football season. In their first season under head coach Bob Wagner, the Rainbow Warriors compiled a 5–7 record.

== Schedule ==
Date	Opponent	Site	Result	Attendance	Source
September 5	Cal State Fullerton*	Aloha Stadium; Halawa, HI	W 44–0	45,408	
September 12	at Wisconsin*	Camp Randall Stadium; Madison, WI	L 7–28	53,509	
September 26	at UTEP	Sun Bowl; El Paso, TX	L 13–37	46,921	
October 3	Yale*	Aloha Stadium; Halawa, HI	W 62–10	41,447–43,238	
October 10	at New Mexico	University Stadium; Albuquerque, NM	W 41–31	15,565	
October 17	Utah	Aloha Stadium; Halawa, HI	W 25–14	41,133	
October 24	BYU	Aloha Stadium; Halawa, HI	L 14–16	46,843	
October 31	San Diego State^{†}	Aloha Stadium; Halawa, HI	L 21–29	41,437	
November 7	Colorado State	Aloha Stadium; Halawa, HI	W 39–38	32,744	
November 21	Air Force	Aloha Stadium; Halawa, HI (rivalry)	L 31–34	43,340	
November 28	Wyoming	Aloha Stadium; Halawa, HI (rivalry)	L 20–24	39,690	
December 5	Arkansas*	Aloha Stadium; Halawa, HI	L 20–38	42,712	
*Non-conference game; ^{†}Homecoming

== Personnel ==
1987 Hawaii Warriors football team roster
Players			Coaches
Offense: Pos. / # / Name / Class	Defense: Pos. / # / Name / Class; DL / / Al Noga / Sr	Special teams: Pos. / # / Name / Class	Head coach: Bob Wagner; Coordinators/assistant coaches: Robert Anae (Graduate assistant); Legend: (C) Team captain; (S) Suspended; (I) Ineligible; Injured; Redshirt
