= 1987 BYU Cougars football team =

American college football season

1987 BYU Cougars football

All-American Bowl, L 16–22 vs. Virginia
- Conference: Western Athletic Conference
- Record: 9–4 (7–1 WAC)
- Head coach: LaVell Edwards (16th season)
- Offensive coordinator: Roger French (7th season)
- Offensive scheme: West Coast
- Defensive coordinator: Dick Felt (13th season)
- Base defense: 4–3
- Home stadium: Cougar Stadium

1987 Western Athletic Conference football standings
	Conf.					Overall
Team	W		L		T	W		L		T
Wyoming $	8	–	0	–	0	10	–	3	–	0
BYU	7	–	1	–	0	9	–	4	–	0
Air Force	6	–	2	–	0	9	–	4	–	0
UTEP	5	–	3	–	0	7	–	4	–	0
San Diego State	4	–	4	–	0	5	–	7	–	0
Hawaii	3	–	5	–	0	5	–	7	–	0
Utah	2	–	6	–	0	5	–	7	–	0
Colorado State	1	–	7	–	0	1	–	11	–	0
New Mexico	0	–	8	–	0	0	–	11	–	0
$ – Conference champion

The 1987 BYU Cougars football team represented Brigham Young University during the 1987 NCAA Division I-A football season. The Cougars were led by 16th-year head coach LaVell Edwards and played their home games at Cougar Stadium in Provo, Utah. The team competed as members of the Western Athletic Conference, finishing in second with a record of 9–4 (7–1 WAC). BYU was invited to the All-American Bowl, where they were defeated by Virginia. The Cougars also participated in a rare college football game played outside the United States, in a regular season finale against Colorado State played in Melbourne, Australia. The game was promoted as the "Melbourne Bowl" but was met with weak enthusiasm in Australia.

== Schedule ==
Date	Opponent	Site	Result	Attendance	Source
September 2	Pittsburgh*	Cougar Stadium; Provo, UT	L 17–27	64,374	
September 12	at Texas*	Texas Memorial Stadium; Austin, TX	W 22–17	65,102	
September 19	at TCU*	Amon G. Carter Stadium; Fort Worth, TX	L 12–33	22,615	
September 26	at New Mexico	University Stadium; Albuquerque, NM	W 45–25	22,286	
October 2	Utah State*	Cougar Stadium; Provo, UT (rivalry)	W 45–24	65,729	
October 10	Wyoming	Cougar Stadium; Provo, UT	L 27–29	65,921	
October 24	at Hawaii	Aloha Stadium; Halawa, HI	W 16–14	46,843	
October 31	Air Force	Cougar Stadium; Provo, UT	W 24–13	65,384	
November 7	San Diego State	Cougar Stadium; Provo, UT	W 38–21	64,341	
November 14	at UTEP	Sun Bowl; El Paso, TX	W 37–24	47,910	
November 21	Utah	Cougar Stadium; Provo, UT (Holy War)	W 21–18	65,686	
December 5	vs. Colorado State	Princes Park; Melbourne, Australia (Melbourne Bowl)	W 30–26	7,652	
December 22	vs. Virginia*	Legion Field; Birmingham, AL (All-American Bowl)	L 16–22	37,000	
*Non-conference game

== Game summaries ==
=== At Texas ===
BYU Cougars (0–1) at Texas Longhorns (0–1)

Quarter	1	2	3	4	Total
BYU	0	14	8	0	22
Texas	7	3	0	7	17

at Texas Memorial Stadium, Austin, Texas

- Date: September 12, 1987
- Game time: 7:00 p.m.
- Game weather: Clear, 87 °F (31 °C)
- Game attendance: 65,102
- Box Score, Box Score

Game information

First quarter

- UT – Bret Stafford 1-yard run (Wayne Clements kick), 8:43. Texas 7–0.

Second quarter

- BYU – David Miles 21-yard pass from Bob Jensen (Leonard Chitty kick), 14:54. Tie 7–7.
- BYU – Chuck Cutler 27-yard pass from Bob Jensen (Leonard Chitty kick), 1:38. BYU 14–7.
- UT – Wayne Clements 46-yard field goal, 0:00. BYU 14–10.

Third quarter

- BYU – Safety, Richard Hobbs blocked punt through end zone, 13:13. BYU 16–10.
- BYU – Leonard Chitty 33-yard field goal, 4:26. BYU 19–10.
- BYU – Leonard Chitty 33-yard field goal, 2:25. BYU 22–10.

Fourth quarter

- UT – Darron Norris 3-yard run (Wayne Clements kick), 1:06. BYU 22–17.

Top passers

- BYU – Bob Jensen – 16/35, 199 yards, 2 TD, INT
- UT – Bret Stafford – 12/26, 107 yards, 3 INT

Top rushers

- BYU – Peter Tuipulotu – 6 rushes, 16 yards
- UT – Darron Norris – 8 rushes, 85 yards, TD

Top receivers

- BYU – Chuck Cutler – 5 receptions, 70 yards, TD
- UT – Tony Jones – 5 receptions, 61 yards

External videos
- Game highlights

=== Air Force ===
Air Force Falcons (6–2) at BYU Cougars (4–3)

Quarter	1	2	3	4	Total
Air Force	10	0	3	0	13
BYU	0	14	10	0	24

at Cougar Stadium, Provo, Utah

- Date: October 31, 1987
- Game attendance: 65,384
- Box Score

Game information

First quarter

- AFA – Steve Yarborough 32-yard field goal. Air Force 3–0.
- AFA – Anthony Roberson 3-yard run (Steve Yarborough kick). Air Force 10–0.

Second quarter

- BYU – Mike O'Brien 3-yard run (Leonard Chitty kick). Air Force 10–7.
- BYU – Fred Whittingham 5-yard pass from Sean Covey (Leonard Chitty kick). BYU 14–10.

Third quarter

- BYU – Leonard Chitty 26-yard field goal. BYU 17–10.
- BYU – Mike O'Brien 2-yard run (Leonard Chitty kick). BYU 24–10.
- AFA – Steve Yarborough 32-yard field goal. BYU 24–13.

Fourth quarter

- No scoring

Top passers

- AFA – Dee Dowis – 2/7, 25 yards, 3 INT
- BYU – Sean Covey – 18/29, 294 yards, TD

Top rushers

- AFA – Quinton Roberts – 15 rushes, 85 yards
- BYU – Mike O'Brien – 16 rushes, 73 yards, 2 TD

Top receivers

- AFA – Tyler Barth – 1 reception, 13 yards
- BYU – Rich Zayas – 3 receptions, 118 yards

External videos
- BYU highlights

== Personnel ==
1987 BYU Cougars football team roster
Players
Coaches
Offense

Pos.	#	Name	Class
RB		Matt Bellini
QB	10	Sean Covey	Jr
WR		Chuck Cutler
QB		Bob Jensen
WR		David Miles
RB		Thor Salanoa
RB		Peter Tuipulotu
FB		Freddie Whittingham

Defense

Pos.	#	Name	Class
LB		Richard Hobbs

Special teams

Pos.	#	Name	Class
K		Leonard Chitty

Head coach

- LaVell Edwards

Coordinators/assistant coaches

Legend

- (C) Team captain
- (S) Suspended
- (I) Ineligible
- Injured
- Redshirt
