= 1995 Hawaii Rainbow Warriors football team =

American college football season

1995 Hawaii Rainbow Warriors football
- Conference: Western Athletic Conference
- Record: 4–8 (2–6 WAC)
- Head coach: Bob Wagner (9th season)
- Offensive coordinator: Kanani Souza (1st season)
- Offensive scheme: Triple option
- Defensive coordinator: George Lumpkin (1st season)
- Base defense: 4–3
- Home stadium: Aloha Stadium

1995 Western Athletic Conference football standings
| | Conf. | | | Overall |
| Team | W | | L | W | | L |
|---|---|---|---|---|---|---|
| Colorado State + | 6 | – | 2 | 8 | – | 4 |
| BYU + | 6 | – | 2 | 7 | – | 4 |
| Utah + | 6 | – | 2 | 7 | – | 4 |
| Air Force + | 6 | – | 2 | 8 | – | 5 |
| San Diego State | 5 | – | 3 | 8 | – | 4 |
| Wyoming | 4 | – | 4 | 6 | – | 5 |
| Fresno State | 2 | – | 6 | 5 | – | 7 |
| New Mexico | 2 | – | 6 | 4 | – | 7 |
| Hawaii | 2 | – | 6 | 4 | – | 8 |
| UTEP | 1 | – | 7 | 2 | – | 10 |
+ – Conference co-champions

The 1995 Hawaii Rainbow Warriors football team represented the University of Hawaiʻi at Mānoa in the Western Athletic Conference during the 1995 NCAA Division I-A football season. In their ninth season under head coach Bob Wagner, the Rainbow Warriors compiled a 4–8 record.

== Schedule ==
| Date | Opponent | Site | Result | Attendance | Source |
|---|---|---|---|---|---|
| September 2 | No. 18 Texas* | Aloha Stadium; Halawa, HI | L 17–38 | 43,243 | |
| September 16 | at Wyoming | War Memorial Stadium; Laramie, WY (rivalry) | L 6–52 | 21,631 | |
| September 23 | UTEP | Aloha Stadium; Halawa, HI | W 42–21 | 38,688 | |
| September 30 | at UNLV* | Sam Boyd Stadium; Whitney, NV | W 50–30 | 15,764 | |
| October 14 | at New Mexico | University Stadium; Albuquerque, NM | L 10–24 | 25,201 | |
| October 21 | UCF* | Aloha Stadium; Halawa, HI | W 45–14 | 31,463 | |
| October 28 | at BYU | Cougar Stadium; Provo, UT | L 7–45 | 64,680 | |
| November 4 | at Fresno State | Bulldog Stadium; Fresno, CA (rivalry) | W 42–37 | 31,228 | |
| November 11 | at Colorado State | Hughes Stadium; Fort Collins, CO | L 0–22 | 25,235 | |
| November 18 | San Diego State^{†} | Aloha Stadium; Halawa, HI | L 10–49 | 33,351 | |
| November 25 | Air Force | Aloha Stadium; Halawa, HI (rivalry) | L 28–45 | 32,459 | |
| December 2 | Oklahoma State* | Aloha Stadium; Halawa, HI | L 20–24 | 32,001 | |
*Non-conference game; ^{†}Homecoming; Rankings from AP Poll released prior to the game
