= 1987 Utah Utes football team =

American college football season

1987 Utah Utes football
- Conference: Western Athletic Conference
- Record: 5–7 (2–6 WAC)
- Head coach: Jim Fassel (3rd season)
- Offensive coordinator: Jack Reilly (3rd season)
- Defensive coordinator: Tom Gadd (7th season)
- Home stadium: Robert Rice Stadium

1987 Western Athletic Conference football standings
	Conf.					Overall
Team	W		L		T	W		L		T
Wyoming $	8	–	0	–	0	10	–	3	–	0
BYU	7	–	1	–	0	9	–	4	–	0
Air Force	6	–	2	–	0	9	–	4	–	0
UTEP	5	–	3	–	0	7	–	4	–	0
San Diego State	4	–	4	–	0	5	–	7	–	0
Hawaii	3	–	5	–	0	5	–	7	–	0
Utah	2	–	6	–	0	5	–	7	–	0
Colorado State	1	–	7	–	0	1	–	11	–	0
New Mexico	0	–	8	–	0	0	–	11	–	0
$ – Conference champion

The 1987 Utah Utes football team represented the University of Utah as a member of the Western Athletic Conference (WAC) during the 1987 NCAA Division I-A football season. In their third season under head coach Jim Fassel, the Utes compiled an overall record of 5–7 with a mark of 2–6 against conference opponents, finished in seventh place in the WAC, and were outscored by their opponents 362 to 321. The team played home games at Robert Rice Stadium in Salt Lake City.

Utah's statistical leaders included Chris Mendonca with 2,389 passing yards, Martel Black with 520 rushing yards, and Carl Harry with 826 receiving yards.

== Schedule ==
Date	Time	Opponent	Site	Result	Attendance	Source
September 5	7:00 pm	New Mexico	Robert Rice Stadium; Salt Lake City, UT	W 24–20	29,112	
September 12	8:00 pm	at San Diego State	Jack Murphy Stadium; San Diego, CA	L 34–52	28,645	
September 19	12:05 pm	at Wisconsin*	Camp Randall Stadium; Madison, WI	W 31–28	56,224	
September 26	7:00 pm	Idaho State*	Robert Rice Stadium; Salt Lake City, UT	W 51–16	32,283	
October 3	12:00 pm	at Air Force	Falcon Stadium; Colorado Springs, CO	L 27–48	35,108	
October 10	12:05 pm	at Colorado State	Hughes Stadium; Fort Collins, CO	W 24–23	10,450	
October 17	11:30 pm	at Hawaii	Aloha Stadium; Halawa, HI	L 14–25	41,133	
October 24	12:00 pm	Utah State*	Robert Rice Stadium; Salt Lake City, UT (Battle of the Brothers)	L 36–41	27,394	
October 31	1:30 pm	at Boise State*	Bronco Stadium; Boise, ID	W 31–27	15,241	
November 7	12:00 pm	UTEP^{†}	Robert Rice Stadium; Salt Lake City, UT	L 24–30	21,150	
November 14	12:00 pm	Wyoming	Robert Rice Stadium; Salt Lake City, UT	L 7–31	23,510	
November 21	12:00 pm	at BYU	Cougar Stadium; Provo, UT (Holy War)	L 18–21	65,686	
*Non-conference game; ^{†}Homecoming; All times are in Mountain time

== Roster ==
1987 Utah Utes football team roster
Players
Coaches
Offense

Pos.	#	Name	Class
WR	29	Michael Connaughton	Jr
WR	88	Aaron Grimm	Jr
WR	11	Carl Harry	Jr
QB	19	Scott Mitchell	Fr
OL	61	John New	Sr
RB	42	Justin Wood	Fr

Defense

Pos.	#	Name	Class
DB	46	Ryan Campbell	Sr
DB	24	Eric Jacobson	Jr

Special teams

Pos.	#	Name	Class

Head coach

- Jim Fassel

Coordinators/assistant coaches

Legend

- (C) Team captain
- (S) Suspended
- (I) Ineligible
- Injured
- Redshirt
