= 1995 Fresno State Bulldogs football team =

American college football season

1995 Fresno State Bulldogs football
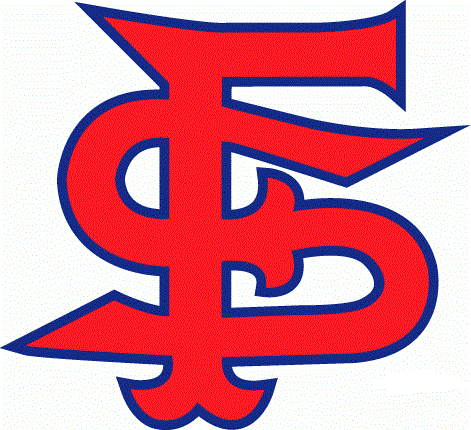
- Conference: Western Athletic Conference
- Record: 5–7 (2–6 WAC)
- Head coach: Jim Sweeney (18th season)
- Offensive coordinator: Jeff Tedford (3rd season)
- Defensive coordinator: Leon Burtnett (2nd season)
- Home stadium: Bulldog Stadium

1995 Western Athletic Conference football standings
	Conf.			Overall
Team	W		L	W		L
Colorado State +	6	–	2	8	–	4
BYU +	6	–	2	7	–	4
Utah +	6	–	2	7	–	4
Air Force +	6	–	2	8	–	5
San Diego State	5	–	3	8	–	4
Wyoming	4	–	4	6	–	5
Fresno State	2	–	6	5	–	7
New Mexico	2	–	6	4	–	7
Hawaii	2	–	6	4	–	8
UTEP	1	–	7	2	–	10
+ – Conference co-champions

The 1995 Fresno State Bulldogs football team represented California State University, Fresno as a member of the Western Athletic Conference (WAC) during the 1995 NCAA Division I-A football season. Led by 18th-year head coach Jim Sweeney, Fresno State compiled an overall record of 5–7 with a mark of 2–6 in conference play, tying for seventh place in the WAC. The Bulldogs played their home games at Bulldog Stadium in Fresno, California.

== Schedule ==
Date	Opponent	Site	Result	Attendance
September 2	Northeast Louisiana*	Bulldog Stadium; Fresno, CA	W 31–17	33,155
September 9	at California*	California Memorial Stadium; Berkeley, CA	W 25–24	35,500
September 16	Pacific (CA)*	Bulldog Stadium; Fresno, CA	W 56–24	34,152
September 23	at Utah	Robert Rice Stadium; Salt Lake City, UT	L 21–25	31,362
September 30	at UCLA*	Rose Bowl; Pasadena, CA	L 21–45	44,499
October 7	New Mexico	Bulldog Stadium; Fresno, California	W 51–34	33,544
October 14	at San Diego State	Jack Murphy Stadium; San Diego, CA (rivalry)	L 24–48	28,506
October 28	Air Force	Bulldog Stadium; Fresno, CA	L 20–31	36,147
November 4	at Hawaii	Aloha Stadium; Halawa, HI (rivalry)	L 37–42	31,228
November 11	UTEP	Bulldog Stadium; Fresno, CA	W 47–14	30,274
November 18	at Wyoming	War Memorial Stadium; Laramie, WY	L 10–38	13,661
November 25	BYU	Bulldog Stadium; Fresno, CA	L 28–45	33,719
*Non-conference game

== Team players in the NFL ==
The following were selected in the 1996 NFL draft.

Player	Position	Round	Overall	NFL team
Reggie Brown	Running back	3	91	Seattle Seahawks
Charlie Jones	Wide receiver	4	114	San Diego Chargers
Jahine Arnold	Wide receiver	4	132	Pittsburgh Steelers
