= 1995 Air Force Falcons football team =

American college football season

1995 Air Force Falcons football

WAC co-champion

Copper Bowl, L 41–55 vs. Texas Tech
- Conference: Western Athletic Conference
- Record: 8–5 (6–2 WAC)
- Head coach: Fisher DeBerry (12th season)
- Offensive coordinator: Paul Hamilton (6th season)
- Offensive scheme: Wishbone triple option
- Co-defensive coordinators: Richard Bell (1st season); Cal McCombs (6th season)
- Base defense: 3–4
- Captain: Game captains
- Home stadium: Falcon Stadium

1995 Western Athletic Conference football standings
	Conf.			Overall
Team	W		L	W		L
Colorado State +	6	–	2	8	–	4
BYU +	6	–	2	7	–	4
Utah +	6	–	2	7	–	4
Air Force +	6	–	2	8	–	5
San Diego State	5	–	3	8	–	4
Wyoming	4	–	4	6	–	5
Fresno State	2	–	6	5	–	7
New Mexico	2	–	6	4	–	7
Hawaii	2	–	6	4	–	8
UTEP	1	–	7	2	–	10
+ – Conference co-champions

The 1995 Air Force Falcons football team represented the United States Air Force Academy as a member of the Western Athletic Conference (WAC) during the 1995 NCAA Division I-A football season. Led by 12th-year head coach Fisher DeBerry, the Falcons compiled an overall record of 8–5 with a mark of 6–2 in conference play, sharing the WAC title with BYU, Colorado State, and Utah. Air Force was invited to the Copper Bowl, where the Falcons lost to Texas Tech. The team played home games at Falcon Stadium in Colorado Springs, Colorado

== Schedule ==
Date	Time	Opponent	Rank	Site	TV	Result	Attendance
September 2		BYU		Falcon Stadium; Colorado Springs, CO		W 38–12	
September 9		Wyoming		Falcon Stadium; Colorado Springs, CO		W 34–10	37,315
September 16		Colorado State	No. 21	Falcon Stadium; Colorado Springs, CO (rivalry)		L 20–27	45,578
September 23	10:30 a.m.	at Northwestern*		Dyche Stadium; Evanston, IL	ESPN	L 6–30	26,037
September 30		at New Mexico		University Stadium; Albuquerque, NM		W 27–24	
October 7		UTEP		Falcon Stadium; Colorado Springs, CO		W 56–43	40,046
October 14		at Navy*		Navy–Marine Corps Memorial Stadium; Annapolis, MD (Commander-in-Chief's Trophy)		W 30–20	
October 21	12:00 p.m.	at Utah		Robert Rice Stadium; Salt Lake City, UT		L 21–22	29,046
October 28		at Fresno State		Bulldog Stadium; Fresno, CA		W 31–20	36,147
November 11		Army*		Falcon Stadium; Colorado Springs, CO (Commander-in-Chief's Trophy)		W 38–20	
November 18	5:45 p.m.	No. 8 Notre Dame*		Falcon Stadium; Colorado Springs, CO (rivalry)	ESPN	L 14–44	54,482
November 25		at Hawaii		Aloha Stadium; Halawa, HI (rivalry)		W 45–28	32,459
December 27	6:00 p.m.	vs. Texas Tech*		Arizona Stadium; Tucson, AZ (Copper Bowl)	ESPN	L 41–55	41,004
*Non-conference game; Rankings from AP Poll released prior to the game; All times are in Mountain time

== Rankings ==
Ranking movements Legend: ██ Increase in ranking ██ Decrease in ranking — = Not ranked RV = Received votes
	Week																
Poll	Pre	1	2	3	4	5	6	7	8	9	10	11	12	13	14	15	Final
AP	RV	RV	RV	21	RV	—	—	—	RV	—	—	—	—	—	—	—	—
Coaches	RV	RV	25	19	RV	—	—	RV	RV	—	—	—	—	—	—	—	—

== Game summaries ==
=== BYU ===
BYU Cougars at Air Force Falcons – Game summary

Quarter	1	2	3	4	Total
Cougars	0	0	6	6	12
Falcons	14	7	10	7	38

at Falcon Stadium, Colorado Springs, Colorado

- Date: September 2
- Box score

Game information
First quarter
- AF – Beau Morgan 4-yard run (Randy Roberts kick), 13:01. Falcons 7–0.
- AF – Jake Campbell 1-yard run (Randy Roberts kick), 1:07. Falcons 14–0.

Second quarter

- AF – Craig Tanner 10-yard run (Randy Roberts kick), 4:12. Falcons 21–0.

Third quarter

- AF – Marc Ranger 37-yard pass from Beau Morgan (Randy Roberts kick), 11:35. Falcons 28–0.
- BYU – Itula Mili 1-yard pass from Steve Sarkisian (kick failed), 6:14. Falcons 28–6.
- AF – Randy Roberts 31-yard field goal, 1:15. Falcons 31–6.

Fourth quarter

- AF – Danta Johnson 3-yard run (Randy Roberts kick), 10:10. Falcons 38–6.
- BYU – Levi Kealaluhi 5-yard pass from Steve Sarkisian (pass failed), 2:52. Falcons 38–12.

Statistics	BYU	AF
First downs	17	28
Total yards	523	317
Rushing yards	394	-29
Passing yards	129	346
Turnovers	3	5
Time of possession	25:10	34:50

Team	Category	Player	Statistics
BYU	Passing	Steve Sarkisian	25/42, 346 yards, 2 TD, 2 INT
BYU	Rushing	Hema Heimuli	7 rushes, 19 yards
BYU	Receiving	Itula Mili	6 receptions, 74 yards, TD
Air Force	Passing	Beau Morgan	8/13, 117 yards, TD
Air Force	Rushing	Jake Campbell	13 rushes, 104 yards, TD
Air Force	Receiving	Marcus Ranger	4 receptions, 70 yards

=== Wyoming ===
Wyoming Cowboys at Air Force Falcons – Game summary

Quarter	1	2	3	4	Total
Cowboys	0	0	3	7	10
Falcons	3	14	7	10	34

at Falcon Stadium, Colorado Springs, Colorado

- Date: September 9
- Game attendance: 37,315
- Box score

Game information
First quarter
- AF – Randy Roberts 39-yard field goal, 7:19. Falcons 3–0.

Second quarter

- AF – Jake Campbell 5-yard pass from Beau Morgan (Randy Roberts kick), 13:08. Falcons 10–0.
- AF – Beau Morgan 1-yard run (Randy Roberts kick), 6:51. Falcons 17–0.

Third quarter

- AF – Tom Brown 1-yard run (Randy Roberts kick), 9:33. Falcons 24–0.
- WYO – Cory Wedel 35-yard field goal, 6:01. Falcons 24–3.

Fourth quarter

- AF – Tom Brown 37-yard run (Randy Roberts kick), 14:30. Falcons 31–3.
- WYO – Marcus Harris 12-yard pass from Josh Wallwork (Cory Wedel kick), 9:12. Falcons 31–10.
- AF – Randy Roberts 30-yard field goal, 4:41. Falcons 34–10.

Statistics	WYO	AF
First downs	18	22
Total yards	378	460
Rushing yards	77	426
Passing yards	301	34
Turnovers	2	0
Time of possession	25:10	34:50

Team	Category	Player	Statistics
Wyoming	Passing	Josh Wallwork	22/39, 301 yards, TD, INT
Wyoming	Rushing	Len Sexton	15 rushes, 37 yards
Wyoming	Receiving	Brent Tillman	8 receptions, 100 yards
Air Force	Passing	Beau Morgan	4/10, 34 yards
Air Force	Rushing	Tom Brown	13 rushes, 99 yards, 2 TD
Air Force	Receiving	Jake Campbell	2 receptions, 16 yards

=== Colorado State ===
Colorado State Rams at No. 21 Air Force Falcons – Game summary

Quarter	1	2	3	4	Total
Rams	0	7	14	6	27
No. 21 Falcons	7	0	7	6	20

at Falcon Stadium, Colorado Springs, Colorado

- Date: September 16
- Game attendance: 45,578
- Box score

Statistics	CSU	AF
First downs		
Total yards		
Rushing yards		
Passing yards		
Turnovers		
Time of possession		

Team	Category	Player	Statistics
Colorado State	Passing		
Colorado State	Rushing		
Colorado State	Receiving		
Air Force	Passing		
Air Force	Rushing		
Air Force	Receiving		

=== At Northwestern ===
Air Force Falcons at Northwestern Wildcats – Game summary

Quarter	1	2	3	4	Total
Falcons	0	6	0	0	6
Wildcats	10	6	0	14	30

at Dyche Stadium, Evanston, Illinois

- Date: September 23
- Game time: 10:30 a.m. MDT/11:30 a.m. CDT
- Game attendance: 26,037
- Box score

Game information
First quarter
- NW – Sam Valenzisi 46-yard field goal, 7:21. Wildcats 3–0.
- NW – Darnell Autry 1-yard run (Sam Valenzisi kick), 4:19. Wildcats 10–0.

Second quarter

- AF – Randy Roberts 26-yard field goal, 13:09. Wildcats 10–3.
- NW – Sam Valenzisi 26-yard field goal, 9:36. Wildcats 13–3.
- NW – Sam Valenzisi 35-yard field goal, 7:16. Wildcats 16–3.
- AF – Randy Roberts 39-yard field goal, 0:31. Wildcats 16–6.

Third quarter

- No scoring plays

Fourth quarter

- NW – Darnell Autry 6-yard run (Sam Valenzisi kick), 14:57. Wildcats 23–6.
- NW – Adrian Autry 5-yard run (Sam Valenzisi kick), 8:37. Wildcats 30–6.

Statistics	AF	NW
First downs	17	22
Total yards	271	468
Rushing yards	137	249
Passing yards	134	219
Turnovers	3	1
Time of possession	27:40	32:20

Team	Category	Player	Statistics
Air Force	Passing	Beau Morgan	11/25, 120 yards, INT
Air Force	Rushing	Tom Brown	10 rushes, 40 yards
Air Force	Receiving	Jake Campbell	3 receptions, 35 yards
Northwestern	Passing	Steve Schnur	16/22, 206 yards
Northwestern	Rushing	Darnell Autry	37 rushes, 190 yards, 2 TD
Northwestern	Receiving	D'Wayne Bates	7 receptions, 110 yards

=== No. 8 Notre Dame ===
No. 8 Notre Dame Fighting Irish at Air Force Falcons – Game summary

Quarter	1	2	3	4	Total
No. 8 Fighting Irish	10	10	17	7	44
Falcons	0	0	7	7	14

at Falcon Stadium, Colorado Springs, Colorado

- Date: November 18
- Game time: 5:45 p.m. MST
- Game attendance: 54,482
- Box score

Game information
First quarter
- ND – Randy Kinder 17-yard run (Scott Cengia kick), 5:26. Fighting Irish 7–0.
- ND – Scott Cengia 30-yard field goal, 0:37. Fighting Irish 10–0.

Second quarter

- ND – Autry Denson 3-yard run (Scott Cengia kick), 9:34. Fighting Irish 17–0.
- ND – Scott Cengia 26-yard field goal, 2:44. Fighting Irish 20–0.

Third quarter

- ND – Scott Cengia 27-yard field goal, 10:07. Fighting Irish 23–0.
- AF – Nakia Addison 8-yard pass from Beau Morgan (Dallas Thompson kick), 6:47. Fighting Irish 23–7.
- ND – Autry Denson 30-yard run (Scott Cengia kick), 4:25. Fighting Irish 30–7.
- ND – Randy Kinder 5-yard run (Scott Cengia kick), 0:42. Fighting Irish 37–7.

Fourth quarter

- ND – Marcus Thorne 5-yard run (Scott Cengia kick), 14:57. Fighting Irish 44–7.
- AF – Matt Brooks 11-yard pass from Beau Morgan (Dallas Thompson kick), 13:03. Fighting Irish 44–14.

Statistics	ND	AF
First downs	27	14
Total yards	514	286
Rushing yards	410	223
Passing yards	104	63
Turnovers	2	3
Time of possession	34:59	25:01

Team	Category	Player	Statistics
Notre Dame	Passing	Thomas Krug	8/13, 96 yards, INT
Notre Dame	Rushing	Randy Kinder	14 rushes, 121 yards, 2 TD
Notre Dame	Receiving	Derrick Mayes	3 receptions, 46 yards
Air Force	Passing	Beau Morgan	8/16, 63 yards, 2 TD, 2 INT
Air Force	Rushing	Nakia Addison	10 rushes, 108 yards
Air Force	Receiving	Jake Campbell	3 receptions, 29 yards

=== Vs. Texas Tech (Copper Bowl) ===
Air Force Falcons vs. Texas Tech Red Raiders (1995 Copper Bowl) – Game summary

Quarter	1	2	3	4	Total
Falcons	7	6	15	13	41
Red Raiders	21	10	7	17	55

at Arizona Stadium, Tucson, Arizona

- Date: December 27
- Game time: 6:00 p.m. MST
- Game weather: Clear, 58 °F (14 °C)
- Game attendance: 41,004
- Referee: Gordon Riese
- TV announcers (ESPN): Brad Nessler and Gary Danielson
- Recap

Game information
First quarter
- TTU – Stacy Mitchell 38-yard pass from Zebbie Lethridge (Tony Rogers kick), 14:27. Red Raiders 7–0.
- AF – Nakia Addison 2-yard run (Dallas Thompson kick), 8:20. Tied 7–7.
- TTU – Byron Hanspard 2-yard run (Tony Rogers kick), 6:19. Red Raiders 14–7.
- TTU – Byron Hanspard 11-yard run (Tony Rogers kick), 0:23. Red Raiders 21–7.

Second quarter

- TTU – Zebbie Lethridge 1-yard run (Tony Rogers kick), 8:25. Red Raiders 28–7.
- AF – Danta Johnson 71-yard run (kick failed), 1:59. Red Raiders 28–13.
- TTU – Tony Rogers 24-yard field goal, 0:03. Red Raiders 31–13.

Third quarter

- AF – Jake Campbell 7-yard run (Nakia Addison run), 11:26. Red Raiders 31–21.
- AF – Danta Johnson 60-yard run (Randy Roberts kick), 8:00. Red Raiders 31–28.
- TTU – Byron Hanspard 2-yard run (Tony Rogers kick), 5:06. Red Raiders 38–28.

Fourth quarter

- TTU – Zebbie Lethridge 3-yard run (Tony Rogers kick), 14:51. Red Raiders 45–28.
- TTU – Tony Rogers 31-yard field goal, 11:15. Red Raiders 48–28.
- AF – Beau Morgan 1-yard run (Randy Roberts kick), 7:09. Red Raiders 48–35.
- TTU – Byron Hanspard 29-yard run (Tony Rogers kick), 4:59. Red Raiders 55–35.
- AF – Nakia Addison 7-yard run (run failed), 0:37. Red Raiders 55–41.

Statistics	AF	TTU
First downs	25	28
Total yards	514	606
Rushing yards	431	361
Passing yards	83	245
Turnovers	1	1
Penalties–yards	6–51	11–90

Team	Category	Player	Statistics
Air Force	Passing	Beau Morgan	7/13, 83 yards
Air Force	Rushing	Danta Johnson	5 rushes, 148 yards, 2 TD
Air Force	Receiving		
Texas Tech	Passing	Zebbie Lethridge	22/41, 245 yards, TD, INT
Texas Tech	Rushing	Byron Hanspard	24 rushes, 260 yards, 4 TD
Texas Tech	Receiving		

== Roster ==
1995 Air Force Falcons football team roster
Players
Coaches
Offense

Pos.	#	Name	Class
RB	1	Sherman Dedrick	So
QB	2	Tom Brown	Jr
WR	3	Jason Olsen	Sr
QB	4	Joe Sheffield	Jr
QB	6	Andre Johnson	Jr
WR	7	Craig Hancock	Sr
RB	8	Jake Campbell	Sr
QB	12	Beau Morgan	Jr
QB	13	Benjamin Trautwein	So
RB	15	Floyd Brazier	So
RB	19	Tobin Ruff	So
RB	20	Steven Walden	So
WR	21	Richie Marsh	Sr
RB	22	Henry Jeffress	So
RB	23	Nicolaus Grauer	So
RB	24	John Ichiyama	Jr
RB	25	Demeatrius Thomas	So
WR	27	Marcus Ranger	Jr
FB	30	Jason Forte	So
FB	33	Brandon Wilkerson	Sr
FB	38	Nakia Addison	Jr
FB	39	Craig Tanner	Jr
RB	40	Danta Johnson	Sr
RB	41	Todd Eilers	Jr
RB	42	Adrian Smith	Jr
TE	45	Alex Pupich	Jr
WR	47	Chris Miller	So
C	50	Nathan Faber	So
C	51	Jeffrey Parr	So
C	52	Adam Edwards	Sr
C	53	Donald Leary	Jr
C	54	Mike Zeman	Jr
C	57	Eric Tibbs	So
C	58	James Mustin	So
C	59	Treg Taylor	So
OT	60	Scott Breece	So
G	61	Karl Falk	So
G	61	Shawn Tellers	So
OT	62	John Sapp	Sr
OT	63	Ryan Paolucci	So
OT	64	Jason Campbell	Jr
OT	64	Geoffrey Hastings	So
G	65	Brad Halloway	Sr
G	66	Frank Niemeyer	So
G	67	Rick Dwyer	Jr
G	69	Brett Cillessen	Sr
OT	70	Mark Thurbush	So
OT	71	Robert Sadler	So
OT	72	Charles Parks	So
OT	73	Daniel Palmer	Sr
OT	74	Adam Schnicker	So
OT	76	Carlton Hendrix	Jr
OT	78	Gerhard Hahn	Sr
OT	79	Micah West	So
WR	80	Jeffrey Green	So
TE	81	Ryan Quaale	So
WR	84	Dustin Tyner	Jr
WR	85	Charles Whitehead	So
TE	86	Matt Brooks	Sr
TE	87	Steve Hendricks	Sr
TE	88	Tait Stamp	So
TE	89	Michael Gargasz	So
C	89	Trent Tripple	Jr
WR	93	Ray Weathersby	So
TE	95	Francisco Ortiz	So

Defense

Pos.	#	Name	Class
DB	1	Michael Burtnett	So
DB	5	Michael Walker	Jr
FS	7	Mitchell Starkey	So
FS	9	Wade Henning	So
DB	9	Sean Lee	So
FS	10	Marcus Alexander	Jr
DB	11	Kelvin King	Sr
DB	16	Paul Brister	So
OLB	17	Melvin Whatley	So
FS	18	Sam Ransom	Jr
DB	20	Frank Staine-Pyne	So
DB	21	Brandt House	Jr
DB	25	Jamie Rhone	So
DB	26	Keith Anderson	So
DB	28	Eric Rockhold	Jr
DB	29	Michael Dalton	Jr
DB	32	LeRon Hudgins	Sr
DB	34	Brian Mulloy	Jr
FS	35	Stephen Pipes	So
FS	36	David Ray	Jr
DB	37	Abe Ebia	So
OLB	38	Vincent Kendrick	So
DB	39	William Nelson	So
ILB	40	Travis Monson	So
ILB	42	Joshua DeMotts	So
ILB	43	Benjamin Banks	So
ILB	44	Lee Guthrie	Jr
OLB	45	Lance Rosa-Miranda	So
DB	46	Ryan Baxter	So
OLB	46	Erin Bender	So
OLB	48	Johnny Vargas	Sr
DT	49	Bobby Halloway	Sr
ILB	51	Chris Gizzi	Jr
OLB	55	Brian McCray	Sr
ILB	56	Steve Fernandez	So
ILB	57	Timothy Schumacher	So
ILB	58	Jeffrey Mohr	So
OLB	59	Mark DeRock	Sr
ILB	61	Michael Hagan	So
OLB	68	Geoffrey Zion	So
DT	70	David Hammer	Jr
NG	71	Rodney Bullard	Sr
DT	75	Brad Hutt	So
DT	76	Christopher Jones	So
DT	77	Ron Jenkins	So
ILB	79	Jason Lamb	Jr
DT	82	Robert Evert	So
DT	83	Rory Rosenbach	So
DT	84	Jarret Hiavaty	So
OLB	86	Ross Johnston	So
NG	90	Jason Verbeck	So
OLB	91	Sean Finnan	So
DT	92	Scott Chandler	So
DT	95	James Maunz	Jr
NG	96	Chris Schweighhardt	Jr
DT	97	Cameron Curry	Jr
NG	98	Joe Suhajda	Jr
LB	99	Keith Ensor	Jr

Special teams

Pos.	#	Name	Class
PK	10	Eli Swanson	So
PK	13	Tyrone Barbery	Jr
PK	16	Randy Roberts	Sr
H	23	Parks Hughes	Sr
PK	31	Kurt Kremser	Sr
PK	47	Jason Therrell	So
DS	54	David O'Connell	So
P	81	Steve Carr	Sr

Head coach

- Fisher DeBerry

Coordinators/assistant coaches

- Paul Hamilton
  Offensive coordinator/Wide receivers
- Cal McCombs
  Co-defensive coordinator/Secondary
- Richard Bell
  Co-defensive coordinator/Linebackers

Legend

- (C) Team captain
- (S) Suspended
- (I) Ineligible
- Injured
- Redshirt

Roster
