= 1995 San Diego State Aztecs football team =

American college football season

1995 San Diego State Aztecs football
- Conference: Western Athletic Conference
- Record: 8–4 (5–3 WAC)
- Head coach: Ted Tollner (2nd season)
- Offensive coordinator: Tom Craft (2nd season)
- Offensive scheme: Spread
- Defensive coordinator: Claude Gilbert (5th season)
- Base defense: 4–3
- Home stadium: Jack Murphy Stadium

1995 Western Athletic Conference football standings
	Conf.			Overall
Team	W		L	W		L
Colorado State +	6	–	2	8	–	4
BYU +	6	–	2	7	–	4
Utah +	6	–	2	7	–	4
Air Force +	6	–	2	8	–	5
San Diego State	5	–	3	8	–	4
Wyoming	4	–	4	6	–	5
Fresno State	2	–	6	5	–	7
New Mexico	2	–	6	4	–	7
Hawaii	2	–	6	4	–	8
UTEP	1	–	7	2	–	10
+ – Conference co-champions

The 1995 San Diego State Aztecs football team represented San Diego State University as a member of the Western Athletic Conference (WAC) during the 1995 NCAA Division I-A football season. Led by second-year head coach Ted Tollner, the Aztecs compiled an overall record of 8–4 with a mark of 5–3 conference play, placing fifth in the WAC. The team played home games at Jack Murphy Stadium in San Diego.

== Schedule ==
Date	Opponent	Rank	Site	TV	Result	Attendance
September 2	California*		Jack Murphy Stadium; San Diego, CA		W 33–9	32,172
September 9	at 14 Oklahoma*		Oklahoma Memorial Stadium; Norman, OK	PSN	L 22–38	71,119
September 16	at BYU		Cougar Stadium; Provo, UT	ESPN	L 19–31	57,221
September 28	Nevada*		Jack Murphy Stadium; San Diego, CA	PSN	W 30–27	23,585
October 7	at Utah		Robert Rice Stadium; Salt Lake City, UT	PSN	W 24–21	31,552
October 14	Fresno State		Jack Murphy Stadium; San Diego, CA (rivalry)	KMPH	W 48–24	28,506
October 21	San Jose State*^{†}		Jack Murphy Stadium; San Diego, CA		W 49–20	31,555
October 28	at UTEP		Sun Bowl; El Paso, TX		W 45–16	13,720
November 4	New Mexico		Jack Murphy Stadium; San Diego, CA		W 38–29	25,119
November 11	Wyoming	No. 25	Jack Murphy Stadium; San Diego, CA		L 31–34	32,848
November 18	at Hawaii		Aloha Stadium; Halawa, HI	ESPN2	W 49–10	27,581
November 25	Colorado State		Jack Murphy Stadium; San Diego, CA		L 13–24	41,603
*Non-conference game; ^{†}Homecoming; Rankings from AP Poll released prior to the game

== Team players in the NFL ==
The following were selected in the 1996 NFL draft.

Player	Position	Round	Overall	NFL team
La'Roi Glover	Defensive tackle – Nose tackle	5	166	Oakland Raiders
DeAndre Maxwell	Wide receiver	7	250	Washington Redskins

== Team awards ==
Award	Player
Most Valuable Player (John Simcox Memorial Trophy)	George Jones
Outstanding Players (Byron H. Chase Memorial Trophy)	Chris Finch, OG; La'Roi Glover, DL; George Jones, RB; Will Blackwell, WR; Craigus Thompson, LB; Ricky Parker, DB
Team captains Dr. R. Hardy / C.E. Peterson Memorial Trophy	Chris Finch, Off; Ricky Parker, Def; La'Roi Glover, Def
Most Inspirational Player	Ray Peterson
