= John Rayborn =

American gridiron football player (born 1975)

No. 6, 9, 13, 12
- Position: Quarterback

Personal information
- Born: August 21, 1975 (age 51); Arlington, Texas, U.S.
- Listed height: 6 ft 3 in (1.91 m)
- Listed weight: 240 lb (109 kg)

Career information
- High school: Lamar (Arlington)
- College: UTEP (1995–1998)
- NFL draft: 1999: undrafted

Career history
- Saskatchewan Roughriders (1999–2000); Indiana Firebirds (2001); Macon Knights (2002); Dallas Desperados (2003)*; Detroit Fury (2003); Columbus Destroyers (2004); New Orleans VooDoo (2004)
- * Offseason or practice squad member only

Awards and highlights
- First-team All-af2 (2002)

Career AFL statistics
- Comp. / Att.: 106 / 171
- Passing yards: 1,181
- TD–INT: 18–8
- QB rating: 89.34
- Rushing TDs: 1
- Stats at ArenaFan.com

John William Rayborn (born August 21, 1975) is an American former professional football quarterback who played in the Canadian Football League (CFL) and Arena Football League (AFL). He played for the Saskatchewan Roughriders of the CFL and the Indiana Firebirds, Detroit Fury, Columbus Destroyers and New Orleans VooDoo of the AFL. He played college football at the University of Texas at El Paso. He was named first-team All-af2 in 2002 while a member of the Macon Knights.

== Early life ==
John William Rayborn was born on August 21, 1975, in Arlington, Texas. He played high school football at Lamar High School in Arlington. He passed for more than 1,700 yards his senior year in 1993.

== College career ==
Rayborn played college football for the UTEP Miners of the University of Texas at El Paso. He was redshirted in 1994 and was a letterman in 1995, 1996, and 1998. He started all 12 games as a redshirt freshman in 1995, completing 156 of 295 passes (52.9%) for 1,913 yards, 16 touchdowns, and 13 interceptions while also rushing for 256 yards and four touchdowns. The Miners finished the season with a 2–10 record. He later tested positive for clenbuterol, an NCAA banned substance. Rayborn claimed it was part of his asthma medication. While facing a possible year-long suspension from the NCAA, Rayborn announced in May 1996 that he would voluntarily sit out the 1996 season. However, he was later ruled academically ineligible anyway. He practiced with the scout team while sitting out the season. On December 16, 1996, UTEP head coach Charlie Bailey announced that Rayborn had been dismissed from the team for "academic reasons". Rayborn was reinstated a few weeks before the start of the 1997 season and began the year as the backup to junior college transfer Craig Strickland. Overall in 1997, Rayborn recorded 47 completions on 108 passing attempts (43.5%) for 640 yards, four touchdowns, and nine interceptions while scoring one rushing touchdown. As a senior in 1998, he completed 139 of 258 passes (53.9%) for 1,641 yards, 12 touchdowns, and six interceptions while also scoring three rushing touchdowns.

== Professional career ==
After going undrafted in the 1999 NFL draft, Rayborn signed with the Saskatchewan Roughriders of the Canadian Football League (CFL) on June 13, 1999. He dressed in all 18 games for the Roughriders during the 1999 season, completing eight of 26 passes (30.8%) for 106 yards and three interceptions while rushing three times for eight yards. He dressed in all 18 games for the second consecutive season in 2000, totaling three completions on eight passing attempts for 31 yards, and two rushing attempts for 14 yards. Rayborn was released on November 12, 2000.

Rayborn signed with the Indiana Firebirds of the Arena Football League (AFL) on February 28, 2001. He played in four games for the Firebirds during the 2001 season, completing 44 of 61 passes (72.1%) for 476 yards, eight touchdowns, and one interception. He re-signed with the team on February 21, 2002, but was waived on April 15, 2002, before the start of the 2002 season.

Rayborn played in 15 games for the Macon Knights of the af2 in 2002, throwing for 3,659 yards and 79 touchdowns while also scoring 19 rushing touchdowns. His 117.1 passer rating was the second best in the league. He was named the af2's Offensive Player of the Week for Week 10 after completing 32 of 41 passes for 352 yards and five touchdowns while also running for three touchdowns in a victory over the Augusta Stallions. Rayborn led the Knights to a 13–3 record and a first round playoff victory over the Stallions before losing to the Florida Firecats in round two of the postseason. He was named first-team All-af2 for his performance during the 2002 season.

Rayborn signed with the AFL's Dallas Desperados on December 27, 2002. However, he was traded to the Detroit Fury for future considerations the next day. He appeared in eight games for the Fury in 2003, completing two of seven passes for 12 yards.

Rayborn was signed by the Columbus Destroyers of the AFL on October 28, 2003. He played in seven games for the Destroyers during the 2004 season, completing 50 of 85 passes (58.8%) for 553 yards, nine touchdowns, and six interceptions while also rushing five times for 13 yards and one touchdown. He was waived on March 27, 2004.

Rayborn was signed to the practice squad of the AFL's New Orleans VooDoo on April 5, 2004. He was promoted to the active roster on April 12. He appeared in three games for the VooDoo that year, recording ten completions on 18 passing attempts (55.6%) for 140 yards, one touchdown, and one interception. Rayborn was placed on injured reserve on May 12, 2004.

== Personal life ==
Rayborn became a real estate agent after his football career.
