= 1995 Utah Utes football team =

American college football season

1995 Utah Utes football

WAC co-champion
- Conference: Western Athletic Conference
- Record: 7–4 (6–2 WAC)
- Head coach: Ron McBride (6th season)
- Offensive coordinator: Fred Graves (1st season)
- Offensive scheme: Pro-style
- Defensive coordinator: Kyle Whittingham (1st season)
- Base defense: 4–3
- Home stadium: Robert Rice Stadium

1995 Western Athletic Conference football standings
	Conf.			Overall
Team	W		L	W		L
Colorado State +	6	–	2	8	–	4
BYU +	6	–	2	7	–	4
Utah +	6	–	2	7	–	4
Air Force +	6	–	2	8	–	5
San Diego State	5	–	3	8	–	4
Wyoming	4	–	4	6	–	5
Fresno State	2	–	6	5	–	7
New Mexico	2	–	6	4	–	7
Hawaii	2	–	6	4	–	8
UTEP	1	–	7	2	–	10
+ – Conference co-champions

The 1995 Utah Utes football team represented the University of Utah as a member of the Western Athletic Conference (WAC) during the 1995 NCAA Division I-A football season. In their sixth season under head coach Ron McBride, the Utes compiled an overall record of 7–4 record with a mark of 6–2 against conference opponents, sharing the WAC title with Air Force, BYU, and Colorado State. Utah outscored its opponents 296 to 230. The Utes were not invited to bowl game, after playing in the postseason each of the three previous seasons. All four of Utah losses were at home; the Utes were perfect 4–0 on the road. The team played home games at Robert Rice Stadium in Salt Lake City.

The 1995 team won two games at home in fourth-quarter comebacks, against Fresno State and Air Force. The comeback against Air Force was won in miraculous fashion with quarterback Mike Fouts throwing a pair of touchdown passes in the final 41 seconds of the game, assisted by a rare onside kick recovery after the first touchdown pass.

== Schedule ==
Date	Time	Opponent	Site	TV	Result	Attendance
September 2	7:00 pm	Oregon*	Robert Rice Stadium; Salt Lake City, UT	KJZZ	L 20–27	30,701
September 9	7:00 pm	Stanford*	Robert Rice Stadium; Salt Lake City, UT		L 20–27	32,107
September 16	6:00 pm	at New Mexico	University Stadium; Albuquerque, NM		W 36–9	26,113
September 23	7:00 pm	Fresno State	Robert Rice Stadium; Salt Lake City, UT		W 25–21	31,362
September 30	7:00 pm	at UTEP	Sun Bowl; El Paso, TX	KJZZ	W 34–21	19,254
October 7	7:00 pm	San Diego State	Robert Rice Stadium; Salt Lake City, UT		L 21–24	31,552
October 14	12:00 pm	Colorado State	Robert Rice Stadium; Salt Lake City, UT		L 14–19	27,691
October 21	12:00 pm	Air Force	Robert Rice Stadium; Salt Lake City, UT		W 22–21	29,046
October 28	12:00 pm	Utah State*^{†}	Robert Rice Stadium; Salt Lake City, UT (Battle of the Brothers)	KJZZ	W 40–20	28,337
November 4	12:00 pm	at Wyoming	War Memorial Stadium; Laramie, WY		W 30–24	12,562
November 18	1:30 pm	at BYU	Cougar Stadium; Provo, UT (Holy War)	ABC	W 34–17	65,829
*Non-conference game; ^{†}Homecoming; All times are in Mountain time

== NFL draft ==
One Utah players was selected in the 1996 NFL draft.

Player	Position	Round	Pick	NFL team
Henry Lusk	Tight end	7	246	New Orleans Saints
