= John Harvey (American football) =

American football player (born 1966)

No. 26
- Position: Running back

Personal information
- Born: December 28, 1966 (age 59); Spring Valley, New York, U.S.
- Listed height: 5 ft 11 in (1.80 m)
- Listed weight: 185 lb (84 kg)

Career information
- High school: Spring Valley (Spring Valley, New York)
- College: UTEP (1985–1988)
- NFL draft: 1989: undrafted

Career history
- Tampa Bay Buccaneers (1989–1990)

Career NFL statistics
- Rushing yards: 113
- Rushing average: 4.2
- Total touchdowns: 1
- Stats at Pro Football Reference

John Lewis Harvey (born December 28, 1966) is a former National Football League running back who played one season with the Tampa Bay Buccaneers.

== Career ==
Harvey attended Spring Valley High School in Spring Valley, New York. Harvey currently holds three school records, Most Career Rushing Yards, with 3,118, Most Rushing Yards in a Season with 1,587 and Most Rushing touchdowns in a game with 6. After graduating in 1984, Harvey went to college at the University of Texas at El Paso. After his time at UTEP, Harvey was signed as an undrafted free agent with the Tampa Bay Buccaneers, serving as a running back and kickoff returner during the 1990 season. He scored one touchdown during the 1990 season.

== Criminal charges ==
In 2008, Harvey was accused of raping a 12-year-old girl, and pled guilty to first-degree rape and a misdemeanor count of endangering the welfare of a child. He was sentenced to 12 years in prison.
