= Sammy Garza =

American football player, coach, and executive (born 1965)

No. 10, 9, 15
- Position: Quarterback

Personal information
- Born: July 10, 1965 (age 61); Corpus Christi, Texas, U.S.
- Listed height: 6 ft 1 in (1.85 m)
- Listed weight: 184 lb (83 kg)

Career information
- High school: Harlingen (Harlingen, Texas)
- College: UTEP
- NFL draft: 1987: 8th round, 216th overall pick

Career history

Playing
- Seattle Seahawks (1987)*; St. Louis Cardinals (1987); Winnipeg Blue Bombers (1989–1991); Frankfurt Galaxy (1991); Winnipeg Blue Bombers (1992–1995); Ottawa Rough Riders (1995)
- * Offseason or practice squad member only

Coaching
- UTEP (1996–1997); Saskatchewan Roughriders (1998–1999); UTEP (2000–2003); Saskatchewan Roughriders (2004)

Operations
- Dallas Cowboys (2005–present) Pro scout

Awards and highlights
- Grey Cup champion (1990)

Career NFL statistics
- Passing attempts: 20
- Passing completions: 11
- Completion percentage: 55.0%
- TD–INT: 1–2
- Passing yards: 183
- Passer rating: 63.1
- Stats at Pro Football Reference

Samuel Mayorga Garza Jr. (born July 10, 1965) is an American former professional football player who was a quarterback in the National Football League (NFL) for the St. Louis Cardinals. He also was a member of the Winnipeg Blue Bombers and Ottawa Rough Riders in the Canadian Football League (CFL). He played college football for the UTEP Miners and was selected by the Seattle Seahawks in the eighth round of the 1987 NFL draft.

== Early life ==
Garza attended Harlingen High School. As a senior, he posted 85-of-160 completions (56 percent) for 1,650 yards, 17 touchdowns and 4 interceptions. He was a two-time All-district 32-5A selection. He led his teams to a 30-10 record during his career, but never had a chance to participate in the playoffs because only one team could qualify at the time.

He was a two-time All-district selection in basketball. As a senior, he received All-district honors at baseball and was the district long jump champion.

== College career ==
Garza accepted a football scholarship from UTEP. As a freshman, he was named the starter at quarterback until, suffering a dislocated right shoulder in the sixth game against the University of Hawaii. He registered 39-of-66 completions for 437 yards, 4 touchdowns and 6 interceptions.

He regained the starter position at quarterback as a sophomore, passing for 899 yards, 4 touchdowns and 10 interceptions. As a sophomore, he compiled 1,654 yards, 6 touchdowns and 12 interceptions. As a senior, he had a record setting season, posting 258 completions, 62.9% completion percentage, 3,140 passing yards, 21 touchdowns and 19 interceptions.

He finished his college career as one of the most prolific passers in school history, ranking first in completions (483) and completion percentage (59.1%). He ranked second in attempts (817), passing yards (6,130) and touchdown passes (35).

== Professional career ==
After being selected by the Seattle Seahawks in the eighth round (216th overall) of the 1987 NFL draft. He was waived on September 1, 1987.

After the NFLPA strike was declared on the third week of the 1987 season, those contests were canceled (reducing the 16 game season to 15) and the NFL decided that the games would be played with replacement players. In September, Garza was signed to be a part of the St. Louis Cardinals replacement team. He started one contest during the replacement games and remained on the roster as a backup after the strike ended. On August 23, 1988, he was released before the start of the season, after being passed on the depth chart by rookie Tom Tupa.

In 1991, he was drafted in the second round by the Frankfurt Galaxy of the World League of American Football.

The brightest spot in Garza's career came in 1993, when he replaced an injured Matt Dunigan in Week 17 of the season. He led the Winnipeg Blue Bombers to a 20-19 victory over the Hamilton Tiger-Cats in the Eastern Final. Garza's success was short lived, as the team lost the Grey Cup 33-23 to the Edmonton Eskimos.

Garza tore his ACL early in the 1994 season in Winnipeg, and spent the next 8 months recovering from that injury. In July 1995, he was traded to the Ottawa Rough Riders along with offensive lineman David Black, in exchange for quarterback Shawn Moore. Even though he spent his time splitting the quarterback duties with Danny Barrett, he still managed to finish the season with 2,954 passing yards and 13 touchdowns. On May 25, 1996, he was signed by the Ottawa Rough Riders, but was released before the start of the season.

== Personal life ==
In 1996, he joined the UTEP coaching staff as a defensive graduate assistant. In 1997, he was promoted to wide receivers coach. In 1998, he was hired as the wide receivers coach for Saskatchewan Roughriders. In 1999, he was promoted to quarterbacks/receivers coach.

In 2000, he returned to UTEP as the quarterbacks coach. He was let go with the entire UTEP staff after the 2003 season. In 2004, he joined the Saskatchewan Roughriders as the quarterbacks and running backs coach.

In 2005, he was hired as a pro scout by the Dallas Cowboys. In 2008, he moved to the College Scouting Department, serving as the southwest area scout (2008-2009), west coast scout (2010-2011) and back to southwest scout in 2012. He works with his brother in law Mike Murphy, son of Canadian Football Hall of Famer Cal Murphy.
