= Chuck Hughes =

American football player (1943–1971)

- Hughes, c. 1971

No. 13, 85
- Position: Wide receiver

Personal information
- Born: March 2, 1943; Philadelphia, Pennsylvania, U.S.
- Died: October 24, 1971 (aged 28); Detroit, Michigan, U.S.
- Listed height: 5 ft 11 in (1.80 m)
- Listed weight: 173 lb (78 kg)

Career information
- High school: Abilene (Abilene, Texas)
- College: Texas Western (1964–1966)
- NFL draft: 1967: 4th round, 99th overall pick

Career history
- Philadelphia Eagles (1967–1969); Detroit Lions (1970–1971)

Awards and highlights
- Detroit Lions No. 85 retired; UTEP Athletics Hall of Fame

Career NFL statistics
- Receptions: 15
- Receiving yards: 262
- Stats at Pro Football Reference

Charles Frederick Hughes (March 2, 1943 – October 24, 1971) was an American football wide receiver who played in the National Football League (NFL) from 1967 to 1971 with the Philadelphia Eagles and the Detroit Lions. He is known for being the only player in NFL history to die on the field during a game.

== Early life ==
Charles Frederick Hughes was born on March 2, 1943, in Philadelphia, Pennsylvania. Hughes moved with his family to Texas when he was young, along with his 12 siblings. Hughes attended high school in Abilene at Abilene High School. He was also an avid golfer and played with Chi Chi Rodriguez and Lee Trevino.

== College career ==
Hughes played college football for the Texas Western Miners, and he is still listed in many of the team's all-time records. His accomplishments include:

- The most all-purpose yards in a single game, 401 in 1965 against North Texas State (he is also second with 360 the same year against Arizona State)
- The most yards per reception for a single game, 34.9, also in 1965 against North Texas, an NCAA record
- The most receptions in a single game, 17, against Arizona State in 1965
- Second in all-purpose yards for a season, with 2044 in 1966
- First in all-purpose yards per game for a season, 204 in 1965
- Second in all-purpose yards per game with 132
- Fifth in all-purpose yards with 3,989
- Second in receiving touchdowns with 19 and in yardage with 2,882 yards

Hughes was inducted into the UTEP Athletics Hall of Fame in 2006.

== Professional career ==
Hughes was selected in the fourth round by the Philadelphia Eagles in the 1967 NFL/AFL draft. He played three seasons with the Eagles before he was traded to the Detroit Lions prior to the 1970 season. Although listed as a wide receiver, Hughes saw most of his action on special teams and was a backup at wide receiver. In his five-year career, he caught 15 passes.

== Death ==
Hughes had suffered an injury in an August 1971 preseason game against the Buffalo Bills and collapsed in the locker room. He was hospitalized, but doctors were unable to diagnose his condition, suspecting a spleen injury, and he was released from the hospital without fully recovering. Hughes, who suffered from what he believed to be acid reflux and other maladies for the remaining two months of his life, insisted on continuing to play, saying that the pain he was experiencing was "not that bad".

On October 24, 1971, the Lions hosted the Chicago Bears at Tiger Stadium. Late in the fourth quarter, with Detroit trailing 28–23, the Lions were driving into Chicago territory and Hughes, who entered the game as an injury replacement, caught a pass from quarterback Greg Landry for 32 yards and a first down at the Bears' 37-yard line.

Three plays later, Landry threw a pass that tight end Charlie Sanders dropped near the end zone. Hughes, a decoy on the play, ran back to the huddle with 1:02 left on the clock, but he suddenly dropped to the turf near the 20-yard line, clutching his chest. He collapsed near Bears linebacker Dick Butkus, who saw Hughes convulse violently on the field and frantically motioned to the sideline for medical assistance.

Both teams' doctors and trainers, along with a physician attending the game, ran to Hughes to administer first aid. An ambulance transported Hughes to Henry Ford Hospital, and the game was played to its conclusion in front of a stunned, silent crowd, with the Bears emerging victorious. At 5:34 pm, Hughes was pronounced dead at the age of 28 years.

A postmortem examination revealed that Hughes was suffering from undiagnosed and advanced arteriosclerosis (one of his coronary arteries was 75% blocked) and that he had a family history of heart disease. The direct cause of death was a coronary thrombosis that stopped the flow of blood to the heart, which caused a massive heart attack.

Hughes was interred in San Antonio, Texas, and all 40 of his Lions teammates and head coach Joe Schmidt attended his funeral. A $10,000 trust fund was established for his two-year-old son by an insurance company. Hughes' widow filed a $21.5 million malpractice lawsuit against Henry Ford Hospital in 1972 for failing to diagnose his condition after the Bills game. The lawsuit was settled on October 3, 1974, for an undisclosed sum. As of October 2026, he is the only player in the history of the NFL to die on the field during a game.

== See also ==
- List of American football players who died during their career
- List of sportspeople who died during their career
- Damar Hamlin, the only other player known to have suffered an in-game cardiac arrest
