= Trevor Vittatoe =

American football player (born 1988)

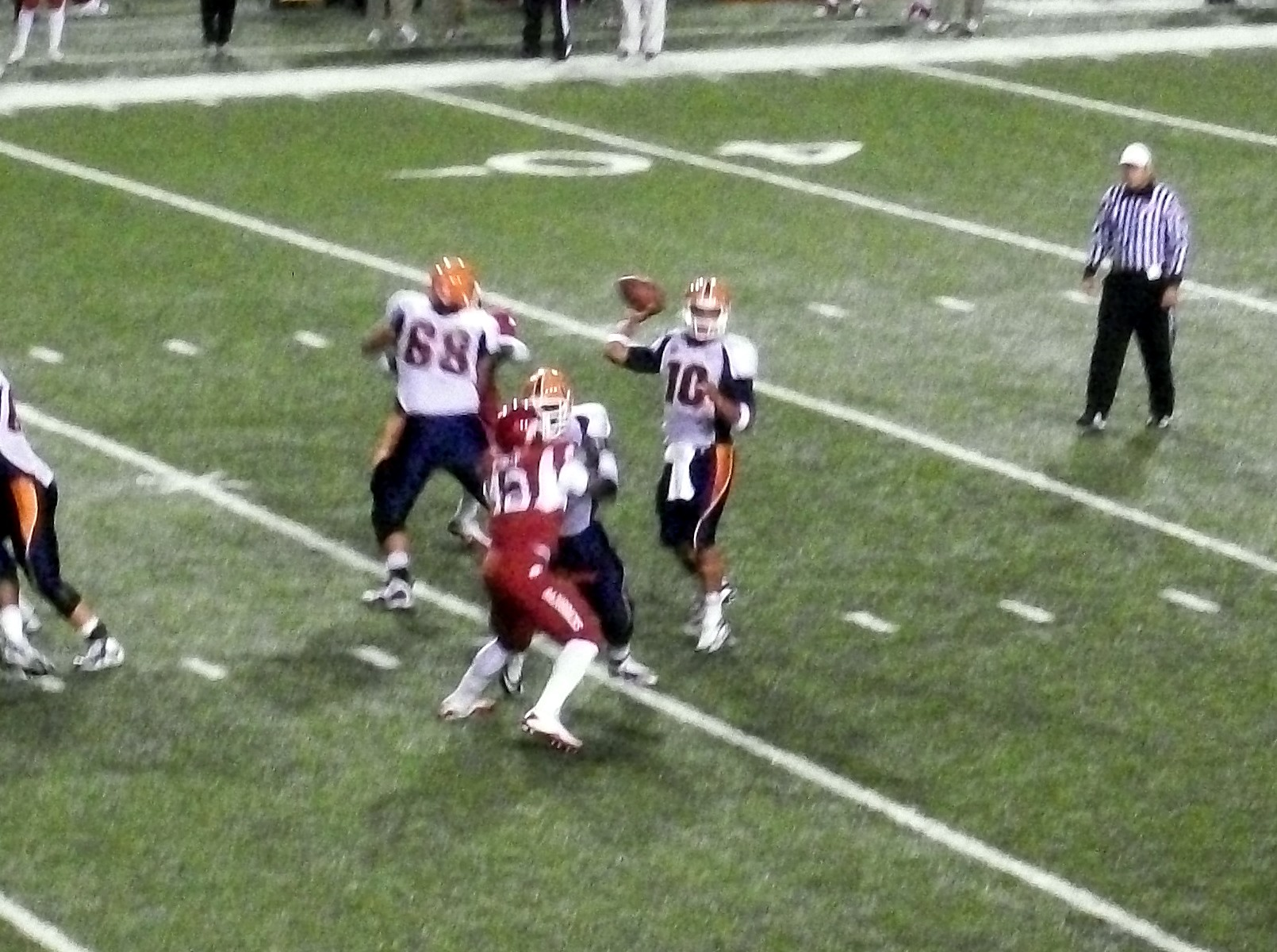
- Vittatoe with UTEP in 2010

No. 14
- Position: Quarterback

Personal information
- Born: January 14, 1988 (age 38); Bedford, Texas, U.S.
- Listed height: 6 ft 2 in (1.88 m)
- Listed weight: 215 lb (98 kg)

Career information
- High school: Trinity (Euless, Texas)
- College: UTEP
- NFL draft: 2011: undrafted

Career history
- Chicago Bears (2011)*; Tampa Bay Storm (2012)*; Indianapolis Colts (2012)*
- * Offseason or practice squad member only

Trevor Vittatoe (born January 1, 1988) is an American former football quarterback. Until June 21, 2012, he was on the off season roster of the Indianapolis Colts of the National Football League (NFL). He was signed by the Chicago Bears as an undrafted free agent in 2011 but never played in a regular season game in the NFL. He played college football for the UTEP Miners.

Vittatoe began his football career with Euless Trinity.

== College career ==
Vittatoe attended the University of Texas-El Paso and played quarterback for four years. He left the Miners as their all-time leader in passing yards, passing touchdowns, total offense and touchdowns. He also broke numerous other records. His four-year statistics left him ranking 14th in passing yards and 15th in passing touchdowns and total offense in college football history. Vittatoe led the Miners to the New Mexico Bowl game his senior year.

=== Statistics ===
Vittatoe's statistics are as follows:

| Year | team | Games | Games Started | Record | Passing | | | | | | | Rushing | | | |
| Year | team | Games | Games Started | Record | Comp | Att | Yards | Pct. | TD | Int | QB rating | Att | Yards | Avg | TD |
|---|---|---|---|---|---|---|---|---|---|---|---|---|---|---|---|
| 2006 | UTEP | Redshirt | | | | | | | | | | | | | |
| 2007 | UTEP | 12 | 12 | 4–8 | 224 | 407 | 3,101 | 55.0 | 25 | 7 | 135.9 | 42 | -132 | -3.1 | 0 |
| 2008 | UTEP | 12 | 12 | 5–7 | 246 | 418 | 3,274 | 58.9 | 33 | 9 | 146.4 | 45 | -31 | -0.7 | 1 |
| 2009 | UTEP | 12 | 12 | 4–8 | 224 | 409 | 3,308 | 54.8 | 17 | 13 | 130.1 | 45 | -83 | -1.8 | 0 |
| 2010 | UTEP | 13 | 13 | 6–7 | 220 | 407 | 2,756 | 54.1 | 22 | 13 | 122.4 | 55 | 98 | 1.8 | 0 |
| Totals | | 49 | 49 | 19–30 | 914 | 1,641 | 12,439 | 55.7 | 97 | 42 | 133.8 | 187 | -148 | -0.8 | 1 |

== Professional career ==
=== Chicago Bears ===
He signed with the Chicago Bears as a rookie free agent on July 26, 2011. Vittatoe was listed as their 4th string QB. He was waived on August 29, 2011.

=== Tampa Bay Storm ===
On February 7, 2012, Vittatoe was assigned to the Tampa Bay Storm of the Arena Football League (AFL).

=== Indianapolis Colts ===
On March 9, 2012, Vittatoe was signed by the Indianapolis Colts just one day after releasing Peyton Manning. He was released on June 21, 2012.

== See also ==
- List of Division I FBS passing yardage leaders
