= Lee Mays =

American football player (born 1978)

No. 89
- Position: Wide receiver

Personal information
- Born: September 18, 1978 (age 48); Houston, Texas, U.S.
- Listed height: 6 ft 2 in (1.88 m)
- Listed weight: 192 lb (87 kg)

Career information
- High school: Westfield (Houston)
- College: Texas El-Paso
- NFL draft: 2002: 6th round, 202nd overall pick

Career history
- Pittsburgh Steelers (2002–2006)

Awards and highlights
- Super Bowl champion (XL)

Career NFL statistics
- Receptions: 11
- Receiving yards: 154
- Stats at Pro Football Reference

Lee Mays Jr. (born September 18, 1978) is an American former professional football player who was a wide receiver for the Pittsburgh Steelers of the National Football League (NFL). He was part of their Super Bowl XL championship team. He played college football for the UTEP Miners.

== Early life ==
Mays attended Westfield High School in Houston, Texas and was a letterman in football and track. In football, he garnered First-team All-District honors as a senior, and Honorable Mention All-District honors as a junior.

== College career ==
In addition to playing on the football team, Mays was an All-American sprinter for the UTEP Miners track and field team, placing 7th in the 4 × 100 meters relay at the 1999 NCAA Division I Outdoor Track and Field Championships.

UTEP statistics
Year	GP	Rec	Yds	Avg	TDs	Long
1998	11	27	496	11.5	3	42
1999	11	60	881	14.7	9	90
2000	11	90	1,567	15.7	15	68
2001	11	110	1,733	13.8	1	45
Totals *	45	277	4,677	14.5	28	90

== Professional career ==
He was selected by the Pittsburgh Steelers with the 202nd pick in the sixth round of the 2002 NFL draft out of the University of Texas-El Paso. Also known as "ODB/Dirt McGurt" (Popular hip hop Monikers) in four seasons with the Steelers, Mays recorded 11 receptions for 154 yards [14.0 avg.], a longest catch of 46 yards and 0 touchdowns. He also returned 36 kickoffs for 750 yards, a 20.8 average, a long of 35 yards, and no touchdowns or 40-yard returns. He did not see any playing time in the Steelers Super Bowl run. He was released by the Steelers after training camp on September 1, 2006, but was re-signed following the release of running back Duce Staley only to be released again due to the team signing Quincy Morgan.

== Post-NFL career ==
He briefly served as color commentator for the now-defunct professional indoor football team the El Paso Generals when the team played at home. Today, he is a Manager at a boutique hotel in the Houston museum district area.

== See also ==
- List of NCAA major college football yearly receiving leaders
