= Brian Natkin =

American football player and coach (born 1978)

New York Jets
- Title: Assistant offensive line coach

Personal information
- Born: January 3, 1978 (age 48); San Antonio, Texas, U.S.
- Listed height: 6 ft 2 in (1.88 m)
- Listed weight: 246 lb (112 kg)

Career information
- Position: Tight end (No. 48)
- High school: Winston Churchill (San Antonio, Texas)
- College: UTEP
- NFL draft: 2001: undrafted

Career history

Playing
- Detroit Lions (2001)*; Tennessee Titans (2001); St. Louis Rams (2003)*
- * Offseason or practice squad member only

Coaching
- UTEP (2004–2005) Graduate assistant; Northern Colorado (2006) Offensive line coach; Midwestern State (2007–2010) Offensive line coach; Midwestern State (2011) Co-offensive coordinator & offensive line coach; UTEP (2012) Offensive line coach; UTEP (2013) Tight ends coach; UTEP (2014–2017) Special teams coordinator & tight ends coach; UTEP (2017) Interim offensive coordinator; Hutchinson CC (2018) Offensive line coach & run-game coordinator; Arizona Cardinals (2019–2022) Assistant offensive line coach; Sam Houston (2023) Offensive line coach; CSU Pueblo (2024) Co-offensive coordinator & offensive line coach; New York Jets (2025–present) Assistant offensive line coach

Awards and highlights
- Unanimous All-American (2000)
- Stats at Pro Football Reference

Brian Natkin (born January 3, 1978) is a coach and an American football former tight end. He is the assistant offensive line coach for the New York Jets, a position he has held since 2025. He also coached for the Arizona Cardinals, Hutchinson Community College, University of Texas at El Paso (UTEP), Midwestern State University, and University of Northern Colorado, among others.

Natkin played college football for the UTEP Miners, earning unanimous selection to the 2000 College Football All-America Team. He played in the NFL for the Tennessee Titans and St. Louis Rams.

== Playing career ==
=== College ===
During the 2000 NCAA Division I-A football season, Natkin lead tight ends nationally with 64 catches for 787 yards. Natkin was a unanimous selection to the 2000 College Football All-America Team, the only ever UTEP player to earn unanimous All-American honors in football. For his college career Natkin had 172 receptions for 1,934 yards and was a three-time first-team All-WAC selection (1998–2000).

=== NFL ===
Pre-draft measurables
Height	Weight	Arm length	Hand span	40-yard dash	10-yard split	20-yard split	20-yard shuttle	Three-cone drill	Vertical jump	Broad jump	Bench press
6 ft 2 1/8 in (1.88 m)	251 lb (114 kg)	33 1/2 in (0.85 m)	9 1/2 in (0.24 m)	4.95 s	1.76 s	2.85 s	4.59 s	7.78 s	27.0 in (0.69 m)	8 ft 2 in (2.49 m)	20 reps
All values from NFL Combine

Natkin played three games for the Tennessee Titans of the National Football League (NFL) in 2001, starting one game. Natkin spent the 2003 pre-season with the St. Louis Rams.

== Coaching career ==
=== College ===
From 2004 to 2005, Natkin was a graduate assistant at UTEP after graduating in 2003. In 2006, Natkin was an assistant coach at the University of Northern Colorado. From 2007 to 2011, Natkin was an assistant coach at Midwestern State University. From 2012 to 2017, Natkin was the tight ends coach and recruiting coordinator at UTEP.

=== National Football League ===
==== Arizona Cardinals ====
On January 13, 2019, Natkin was hired by the Arizona Cardinals of the NFL to be their assistant offensive line coach.

==== New York Jets ====
On February 11, 2025, the New York Jets announced that Natkin was hired of the NFL to be their assistant offensive line coach.
