= Billy Stevens =

American football player (born 1945)

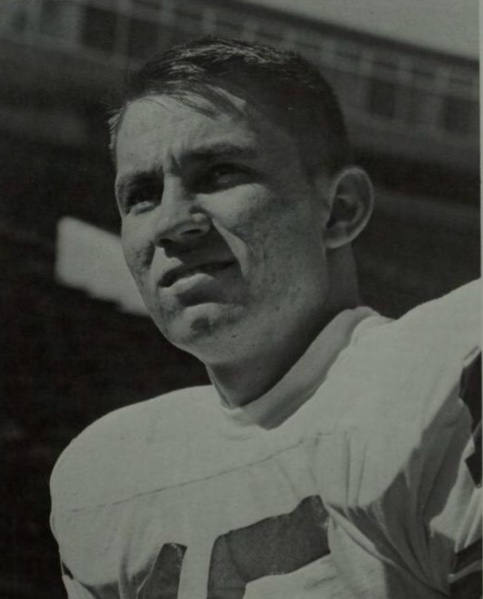
- Stevens from the 1966 Flowsheet

No. 10
- Position: Quarterback

Personal information
- Born: August 27, 1945 (age 81); Galveston, Texas, U.S.
- Listed height: 6 ft 2 in (1.88 m)
- Listed weight: 195 lb (88 kg)

Career information
- High school: Ball (Galveston)
- College: UTEP (1964-1967)
- NFL draft: 1968: 3rd round, 67th overall pick

Career history
- Odessa Comets / West Texas Rufneks (1968); Green Bay Packers (1968–1969); West Texas Rufneks (1969)

Career NFL statistics
- Passing yards: 12
- Passer rating: 39.6
- Stats at Pro Football Reference

William Samuel Stevens (born August 27, 1945) is an American former professional football player who was a quarterback in the National Football League (NFL). Stevens was selected by the Green Bay Packers in the third round of the 1968 NFL/AFL draft. He played two seasons with the team. He was later acquired by the Chicago Bears, but did not appear in a game for them.

During his college football career with the UTEP Miners, he became the second player (after Charley Johnson) to be named most valuable player of the Sun Bowl twice, winning the award in 1965 and 1967. He was a two-time All-American, and was the NCAA’s all-time passing yardage leader at the conclusion of his senior season.

Stevens received a Bachelor of Science degree in education from the University of Texas at El Paso in 1968. After his playing days, he returned to El Paso and worked as a teacher, coach, and finally in banking.
