= 1995 UTEP Miners football team =

American college football season

1995 UTEP Miners football
- Conference: Western Athletic Conference
- Record: 2–10 (1–7 WAC)
- Head coach: Charlie Bailey (3rd season)
- Offensive coordinator: Darrell Dickey (2nd season)
- Defensive coordinator: Pete Kuharchek (2nd season)
- Home stadium: Sun Bowl

1995 Western Athletic Conference football standings
| | Conf. | | | Overall |
| Team | W | | L | W | | L |
|---|---|---|---|---|---|---|
| Colorado State + | 6 | – | 2 | 8 | – | 4 |
| BYU + | 6 | – | 2 | 7 | – | 4 |
| Utah + | 6 | – | 2 | 7 | – | 4 |
| Air Force + | 6 | – | 2 | 8 | – | 5 |
| San Diego State | 5 | – | 3 | 8 | – | 4 |
| Wyoming | 4 | – | 4 | 6 | – | 5 |
| Fresno State | 2 | – | 6 | 5 | – | 7 |
| New Mexico | 2 | – | 6 | 4 | – | 7 |
| Hawaii | 2 | – | 6 | 4 | – | 8 |
| UTEP | 1 | – | 7 | 2 | – | 10 |
+ – Conference co-champions

The 1995 UTEP Miners football team was an American football team that represented the University of Texas at El Paso in the Western Athletic Conference during the 1995 NCAA Division I-A football season. In their third year under head coach Charlie Bailey, the team compiled a 2–10 record.

== Schedule ==
| Date | Opponent | Site | Result | Attendance |
|---|---|---|---|---|
| September 2 | at New Mexico State* | Aggie Memorial Stadium; Las Cruces, NM (rivalry) | L 17–45 | 29,921 |
| September 9 | at Arizona State* | Sun Devil Stadium; Tempe, AZ | L 20–45 | 43,089 |
| September 16 | Valdosta State* | Sun Bowl; El Paso, TX | W 34–24 | 28,737 |
| September 23 | at Hawaii | Aloha Stadium; Halawa, HI | L 21–42 | 38,688 |
| September 30 | Utah | Sun Bowl; El Paso, TX | L 21–34 | 19,254 |
| October 7 | at Air Force | Falcon Stadium; Colorado Springs, CO | L 46–56 | 40,046 |
| October 14 | Tulsa^{†} | Sun Bowl; El Paso, TX | L 28–38 | 19,931 |
| October 28 | San Diego State | Sun Bowl; El Paso, TX | L 16–45 | 13,720 |
| November 4 | at Colorado State | Hughes Stadium; Fort Collins, CO | L 10–56 | 22,013 |
| November 11 | at Fresno State | Bulldog Stadium; Fresno, CA | L 14–47 | 30,274 |
| November 18 | New Mexico | Sun Bowl; El Paso, TX | W 17–12 | 13,837 |
| November 25 | Wyoming | Sun Bowl; El Paso, TX | L 19–42 | 31,383 |
*Non-conference game; ^{†}Homecoming
