= 1987 UTEP Miners football team =

American college football season

1987 UTEP Miners football
- Conference: Western Athletic Conference
- Record: 7–4 (5–3 WAC)
- Head coach: Bob Stull (2nd season)
- Offensive coordinator: Dirk Koetter (2nd season)
- Home stadium: Sun Bowl

1987 Western Athletic Conference football standings
	Conf.					Overall
Team	W		L		T	W		L		T
Wyoming $	8	–	0	–	0	10	–	3	–	0
BYU	7	–	1	–	0	9	–	4	–	0
Air Force	6	–	2	–	0	9	–	4	–	0
UTEP	5	–	3	–	0	7	–	4	–	0
San Diego State	4	–	4	–	0	5	–	7	–	0
Hawaii	3	–	5	–	0	5	–	7	–	0
Utah	2	–	6	–	0	5	–	7	–	0
Colorado State	1	–	7	–	0	1	–	11	–	0
New Mexico	0	–	8	–	0	0	–	11	–	0
$ – Conference champion

The 1987 UTEP Miners football team was an American football team that represented the University of Texas at El Paso in the Western Athletic Conference during the 1987 NCAA Division I-A football season. In their second year under head coach Bob Stull, the team compiled a 7–4 record.

== Schedule ==
Date	Opponent	Site	Result	Attendance	Source
September 5	New Mexico State*	Sun Bowl; El Paso, TX (rivalry)	W 31–0	45,819	
September 19	at Colorado State	Hughes Stadium; Fort Collins, CO	W 45–6	21,472	
September 26	Hawaii	Sun Bowl; El Paso, TX	W 37–13	46,921	
October 3	at No. 13 Arizona State*	Sun Devil Stadium; Tempe, AZ	L 16–35	70,372	
October 10	at San Diego State	Jack Murphy Stadium; San Diego, CA	W 34–33	20,744	
October 17	Lamar*^{†}	Sun Bowl; El Paso, TX	W 38–14	49,481	
October 24	at Air Force	Falcon Stadium; Colorado Springs, CO	L 7–35	36,922	
October 31	New Mexico	Sun Bowl; El Paso, TX	W 34–0	32,517	
November 7	at Utah	Robert Rice Stadium; Salt Lake City, UT	W 30–24	21,150	
November 14	BYU	Sun Bowl; El Paso, TX	L 24–37	47,910	
November 21	Wyoming	Sun Bowl; El Paso, TX	L 13–37	29,865	
*Non-conference game; ^{†}Homecoming; Rankings from AP Poll released prior to the game
