= Kris Adams =

American football player (born 1987)

No. 81, 82
- Position: Wide receiver

Personal information
- Born: September 4, 1987 (age 39); Fort Worth, Texas, U.S.
- Listed height: 6 ft 3 in (1.91 m)
- Listed weight: 194 lb (88 kg)

Career information
- High school: Everman (TX)
- College: Texas-El Paso
- NFL draft: 2011: undrafted

Career history
- Chicago Bears (2011)*; St. Louis Rams (2011)*; Minnesota Vikings (2011–2012)*; Indianapolis Colts (2012); New York Giants (2013); Winnipeg Blue Bombers (2016)
- * Offseason or practice squad member only

Career NFL statistics
- Receptions: 2
- Receiving yards: 26
- Stats at Pro Football Reference

Career CFL statistics
- Receptions: 3
- Receiving yards: 41
- Stats at CFL.ca

Kris Adams (born September 4, 1987) is an American former professional football player who was a wide receiver in the National Football League (NFL) and Canadian Football League (CFL). He played college football for the UTEP Miners and was signed as an undrafted free agent in 2011 by the Chicago Bears. Adams was also a member of the St. Louis Rams, Minnesota Vikings, Indianapolis Colts, New York Giants, and Winnipeg Blue Bombers.

== Professional career ==
=== Chicago Bears ===
On July 26, 2011, Adams was signed by the Chicago Bears as an undrafted free agent. On September 3, 2011, Adams was waived by the Bears. He cleared waivers and was placed on the Bears' practice squad. On October 11, 2011, he was released from the Bears' practice squad.

=== St. Louis Rams ===
On October 18, 2011, Adams was signed to the St. Louis Rams’ practice squad. He was released from the Rams’ practice squad on November 8, 2011.

=== Minnesota Vikings ===
On December 14, 2011, the Minnesota Vikings signed Adams to the practice squad. On January 2, 2012, the Vikings signed Adams to a reserve/future contract. He was waived by the Vikings on May 14, 2012.

=== Indianapolis Colts ===
On June 5, 2012, Adams was signed by the Indianapolis Colts. On October 6, 2012, Adams was waived by the Colts. On October 8, 2012, he was re-signed and placed on the practice squad.

=== New York Giants ===
On January 15, 2013, Adams signed a reserve/future contract with the New York Giants. On August 10, 2013, in the Giants' first preseason game against the Pittsburgh Steelers, Adams suffered a fractured lower leg. On August 12, 2013, he was waived/injured by the Giants. He cleared waivers and was placed on the Giants' injured reserve list. On July 30, 2014, he was listed as Reserve/Injured.

== See also ==
- List of NCAA major college football yearly receiving leaders
