= Morris Unutoa =

American football player (born 1971)

No. 68, 54
- Positions: Center, long snapper

Personal information
- Born: March 10, 1971 (age 55); Torrance, California, U.S.
- Listed height: 6 ft 1 in (1.85 m)
- Listed weight: 284 lb (129 kg)

Career information
- High school: Carson (Carson, California)
- College: BYU
- NFL draft: 1996: undrafted

Career history
- Philadelphia Eagles (1996–1998); Tampa Bay Buccaneers (1999–2000); Buffalo Bills (2001); New York Giants (2002)*; Tampa Bay Buccaneers (2002); Ottawa Renegades (2006)
- * Offseason or practice squad member only

Awards and highlights
- Super Bowl champion (XXXVII)

Career NFL statistics
- Total tackles: 3
- Stats at Pro Football Reference

Morris Taua Unutoa (born March 1, 1971) is an American former professional football player who was an offensive lineman in the National Football League (NFL) for the Philadelphia Eagles, Tampa Bay Buccaneers, and Buffalo Bills. He played college football for the BYU Cougars.
