= Donald Buckram =

American football player and coach (born 1988)

No. 3
- Position: Running back

Personal information
- Born: February 9, 1988 (age 38); Fort Hood, Texas, U.S.
- Listed height: 5 ft 10 in (1.78 m)
- Listed weight: 195 lb (88 kg)

Career information
- High school: Copperas Cove High School, Copperas Cove, Texas
- College: University of Texas-El Paso (2006–2010)

Awards and highlights
- Led CUSA in rushing in 2009

Donald Ray Buckram Jr. (born February 9, 1988) is an American college football coach and former running back. He played college football for the UTEP Miners football team. In 2009, he led Conference USA in rushing with 1,594 yards and 18 touchdowns, including 262 yards in a win over the #14 ranked University of Houston Cougars. In December 2009, he was named a Fourth team All-American by Phil Steele.

In July 2011, he was released by the Cleveland Browns after failing a physical.

He now coaches running backs at Copperas Cove High School with head coach Jason Hammett.

== See also ==
- List of NCAA major college football yearly scoring leaders
