= Charlie Bailey (American football) =

American football player and coach (born 1940)

Biographical details
- Born: July 20, 1940 (age 86); Poca, West Virginia, U.S.

Playing career
- c. 1960: Tampa
- Position: Defensive lineman

Coaching career (HC unless noted)
- 1962: Poca HS (WV) (assistant)
- 1963: Brandon HS (FL) (assistant)
- 1964–1970: Tampa (assistant)
- 1971: Miami (FL) (assistant)
- 1972–1974: Rice (assistant)
- 1975–1981: Kentucky (assistant)
- 1982: Pittsburgh (DC)
- 1983–1984: Tampa Bay Bandits (AHC/DC)
- 1985: Florida (DC/ILB)
- 1986–1988: Memphis State
- 1990–1991: UTEP (DC)
- 1992: Orlando Thunder (DC/LB)
- 1993: UTEP (DC)
- 1993–1999: UTEP
- 2001: Orlando Rage (DC/LB)

Head coaching record
- Overall: 31–73–2

Accomplishments and honors

Awards
- University of Tampa Athletic Hall of Fame (1984)

Charlie Bailey (born July 20, 1940) is an American former football coach. He was hired as the head football coach at the University of Memphis in December 1985, where he put together a 12–20–1 record. He resigned from Memphis in 1989 after allegations that two of his athletes lied about contacts with school boosters. In 1993, he moved to the University of Texas at El Paso, where he posted a 19–53–1 record. After the 1999 season, he was replaced by Gary Nord.

== Head coaching record ==
Year	Team	Overall	Conference	Standing	Bowl/playoffs
Memphis State Tigers (NCAA Division I-A independent) (1986–1988)
1986	Memphis State	1–10			
1987	Memphis State	5–5–1			
1988	Memphis State	6–5			
Memphis State:		12–20–1			
UTEP Miners (Western Athletic Conference) (1993–1999)
1993	UTEP	0–5 (Note: David Lee served as UTEP's head coach for the first seven games of the season, leading the Miners to a record of 1–6 with an 0–3 conference mark. UTEP finished the season at 1–11 overall and 0–8 in conference.)	0–5	10th	
1994	UTEP	3–7–1	1–6–1	9th	
1995	UTEP	2–10	1–7	10th	
1996	UTEP	2–9	0–8	8th (Mountain)	
1997	UTEP	4–7	3–5	6th (Mountain)	
1998	UTEP	3–8	3–5	T–5th (Pacific)	
1999	UTEP	5–7	3–4	6th	
UTEP:		19–53–2	11–40–1		
Total:		31–73–3			
