= 2003 UTEP Miners football team =

American college football season

2003 UTEP Miners football
- Conference: Western Athletic Conference
- Record: 2–11 (1–7 WAC)
- Head coach: Gary Nord (4th season)
- Offensive coordinator: Patrick Higgins (4th season)
- Defensive coordinator: Troy Reffett (2nd season)
- Home stadium: Sun Bowl

2003 Western Athletic Conference football standings
	Conf.			Overall
Team	W		L	W		L
No. 16 Boise State $	8	–	0	13	–	1
Fresno State	6	–	2	9	–	5
Tulsa	6	–	2	8	–	5
Hawaii	5	–	3	9	–	5
Rice	5	–	3	5	–	7
Nevada	4	–	4	6	–	6
Louisiana Tech	3	–	5	5	–	7
San Jose State	2	–	6	3	–	8
UTEP	1	–	7	2	–	10
SMU	0	–	8	0	–	12
$ – Conference champion; Rankings from AP Poll

The 2003 UTEP Miners football team represented the University of Texas at El Paso (UTEP) as a member of the Western Athletic Conference (WAC) during the 2003 NCAA Division I-A football season. Led by Gary Nord in his fourth and final season as head coach, the Miners compiled an overall record of 2–11 with a mark of 1–7 in conference play, placing ninth in the WAC. The team played home games at the Sun Bowl in El Paso, Texas.

== Schedule ==
Date	Time	Opponent	Site	TV	Result	Attendance	Source
August 30	8:00 pm	at Arizona*	Arizona Stadium; Tucson, AZ	TWCEP	L 7–42	40,264	
September 6	7:05 pm	Cal Poly*	Sun Bowl; El Paso, TX		L 13–34	26,224	
September 13	7:05 pm	San Diego State*	Sun Bowl; El Paso, TX		L 0–34	18,195	
September 20	1:00 pm	at Louisville*	Papa John's Cardinal Stadium; Louisville, KY	TWCEP	L 14–42	40,205	
September 27	7:05 pm	Sam Houston State*	Sun Bowl; El Paso, TX		W 59–14	17,211	
October 4	6:00 pm	at SMU	Gerald J. Ford Stadium; Dallas, TX	TWCEP	W 21–19	21,412	
October 11	7:05 pm	Louisiana Tech^{†}	Sun Bowl; El Paso, TX		L 35–38	28,144	
October 25	10:00 pm	at Hawaii	Aloha Stadium; Halawa, HI	ESPNGP	L 15–31	40,136	
November 1	3:05 pm	Tulsa	Sun Bowl; El Paso, TX		L 28–56	17,095	
November 8	3:05 pm	San Jose State	Sun Bowl; El Paso, TX	SPW	L 41–69	18,095	
November 15	1:05 pm	at No. 23 Boise State	Bronco Stadium; Boise, ID		L 21–51	24,513	
November 22	1:00 pm	at Rice	Rice Stadium; Houston, TX	SPW	L 14–45	10,465	
November 29	3:05 pm	Fresno State	Sun Bowl; El Paso, TX		L 20–23	15,101	
*Non-conference game; ^{†}Homecoming; Rankings from AP Poll released prior to the game; All times are in Mountain time
