= 1988 NFL draft =

National Football League draft

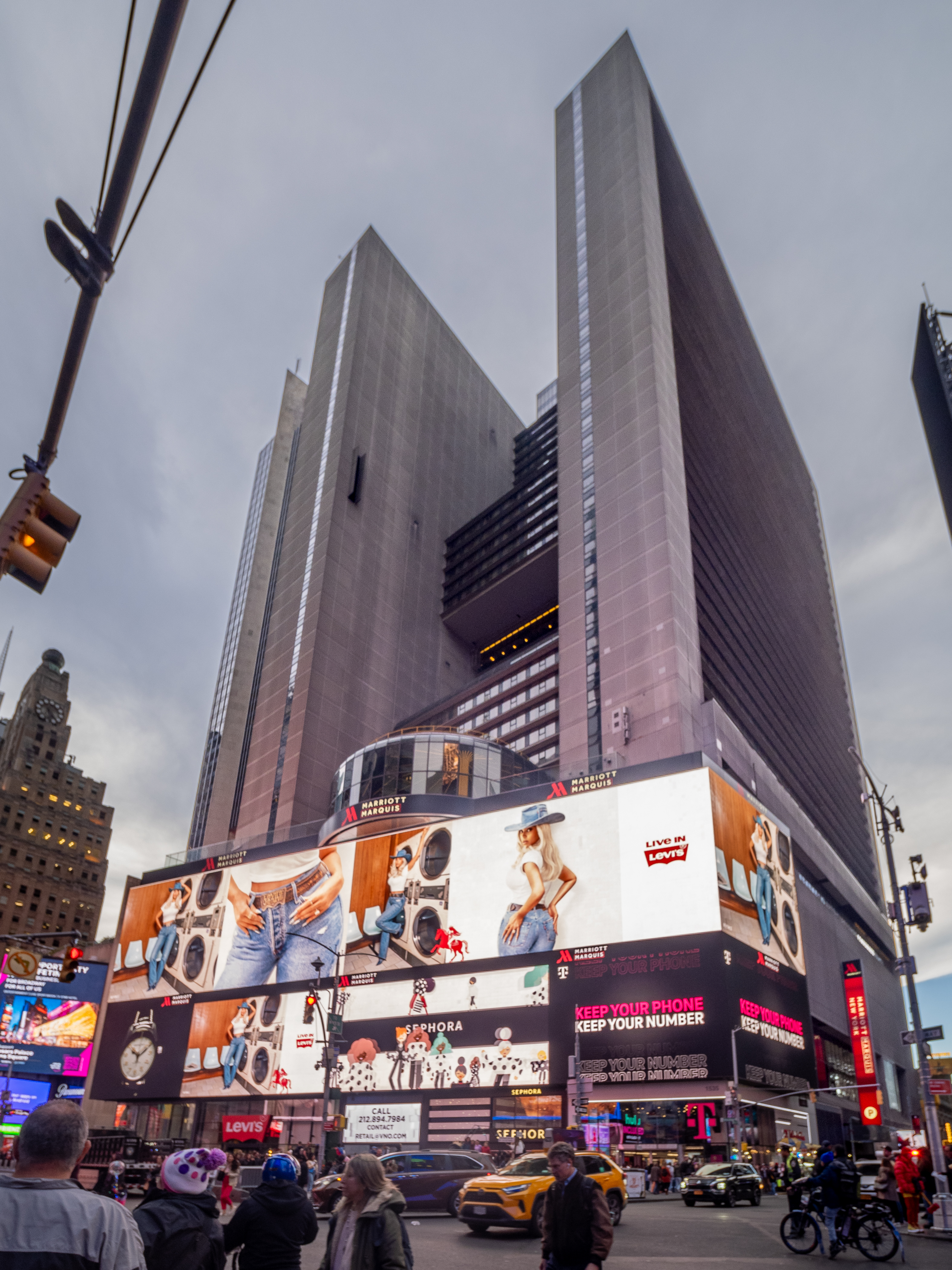
- New York Marriott Marquis (draft venue), photographed in 2024

General information
- Date: April 24–25, 1988
- Location: New York Marriott Marquis in New York City
- Network: ESPN

Overview
- 333 total selections in 12 rounds
- League: National Football League
- First selection: Aundray Bruce, LB; Atlanta Falcons
- Mr. Irrelevant: Jeff Beathard, WR; Los Angeles Rams
- Most selections (14): Buffalo Bills; Chicago Bears; Los Angeles Rams; New Orleans Saints; New York Giants; Miami Dolphins
- Fewest selections (8): Indianapolis Colts
- Hall of Famers: 7: WR Tim Brown; WR Sterling Sharpe; WR Michael Irvin; G Randall McDaniel; CB Eric Allen; RB Thurman Thomas; C Dermontti Dawson

The 1988 NFL draft was the procedure by which National Football League teams selected amateur college football players. It is officially known as the NFL Annual Player Selection Meeting. The draft was held April 24–25, 1988, at the Marriot Marquis in New York City, New York. The league also held a supplemental draft after the regular draft and before the regular season.

With the first overall pick of the draft, the Atlanta Falcons selected linebacker Aundray Bruce. The first player selected at the quarterback position was not selected until the third round (68th overall) with Tom Tupa (by the Phoenix Cardinals), who was also selected for his punting capabilities. This remains the latest point in NFL history in which the first quarterback has been selected. Since then, the 1996 NFL draft is the only other instance in which no quarterback was selected in the first round.

== Player selections ==
*	Compensatory selection
†	Pro Bowler
‡	Hall of Famer

Positions key
Offense	Defense	Special teams
QB — Quarterback; RB — Running back; FB — Fullback; WR — Wide receiver; TE — Tight end; OL — Offensive lineman; T — Tackle; G — Guard; C — Center	DL — Defensive lineman; DT — Defensive tackle (Note: Includes nose tackle (NT)); DE — Defensive end; EDGE — Edge rusher; LB — Linebacker (Note: Includes middle linebacker (MLB/MIKE), weakside linebacker (WILL), strongside linebacker (SAM), off-ball linebacker, and outside linebacker (OLB)); DB — Defensive back; CB — Cornerback; S — Safety (Note: Includes free safety (FS) and strong safety (SS))	K — Kicker (Note: Also known as a placekicker (PK)); P — Punter; LS — Long snapper; RS — Return specialist (Note: Includes kickoff and punt returners)

Rnd.	Pick	Team	Player	Pos.	College	Notes
1	1	Atlanta Falcons	Aundray Bruce	LB	Auburn	
1	2	Kansas City Chiefs	Neil Smith ^{†}	DE	Nebraska	from Detroit (Note: No. 2: Detroit → Kansas City (D). Detroit traded a first-round selection (2nd overall) to Kansas City in exchange for first- and second-round selections (3rd and 29th overall).)
1	3	Detroit Lions	Bennie Blades ^{†}	S	Miami	from Kansas City (Note: No. 3: Kansas City → Detroit (D). See Round 1: Detroit → Kansas City.)
1	4	Tampa Bay Buccaneers	Paul Gruber ^{†}	T	Wisconsin	
1	5	Cincinnati Bengals	Rickey Dixon	CB	Oklahoma	
1	6	Los Angeles Raiders	Tim Brown^{‡}^{†}	WR	Notre Dame	Heisman Trophy.
1	7	Green Bay Packers	Sterling Sharpe^{‡}^{†}	WR	South Carolina	
1	8	New York Jets	Dave Cadigan	G	USC	
1	9	Los Angeles Raiders	Terry McDaniel ^{†}	CB	Tennessee	from LA Rams via Houston (Note: No. 9: LA Rams → Houston → LA Raiders. Multiple trades: LA Rams → Houston (PD). LA Rams traded a first-round selection (9th overall), 1987 first- and fifth-round selections, G Kent Hill and the rights to DE William Fuller to Houston in exchange for the rights to QB Jim Everett. Houston → LA Raiders (PD). Houston traded first-, third- and fourth-round selections (9th, 74th and 102nd overall) to the LA Raiders in exchange for second- and third-round selections (48th and 60th overall) and DE Sean Jones.)
1	10	New York Giants	Eric Moore	G	Indiana	
1	11	Dallas Cowboys	Michael Irvin^{‡}^{†}	WR	Miami (FL)	
1	12	Phoenix Cardinals	Ken Harvey ^{†}	LB	California	
1	13	Philadelphia Eagles	Keith Jackson ^{†}	TE	Oklahoma	
1	14	Los Angeles Rams	Gaston Green ^{†}	RB	UCLA	from Buffalo via Indianapolis (Note: No. 14: Buffalo → Indianapolis → LA Rams. Multiple trades: Buffalo → Indianapolis (PD). Buffalo traded a first-round selection (14th overall), 1989 first- and second-round selections, and RB Greg Bell to Indianapolis in exchange for LB Cornelius Bennett. Indianapolis → LA Rams (PD). Indianapolis traded two first-round selections and a second-round selection (14th, 20th and 47th overall), a 1989 first-round selection and two 1989 second-round selections, RB Greg Bell and RB Owen Gill to the LA Rams in exchange for RB Eric Dickerson.)
1	15	San Diego Chargers	Anthony Miller ^{†}	WR	Tennessee	
1	16	Miami Dolphins	Eric Kumerow	LB	Ohio State	
1	17	New England Patriots	John Stephens ^{†}	RB	Northwestern State	
1	18	Pittsburgh Steelers	Aaron Jones	DE	Eastern Kentucky	
1	19	Minnesota Vikings	Randall McDaniel^{‡}^{†}	G	Arizona State	
1	–	Seattle Seahawks	Selection forfeited during the 1987 supplemental draft. (Note: Seattle forfeited a first-round selection after selecting LB Brian Bosworth in the 1987 supplemental draft.)			
1	20	Los Angeles Rams	Aaron Cox	WR	Arizona State	from Indianapolis (Note: No. 20: Indianapolis → LA Rams (PD). See Round 1: Indianapolis → LA Rams.)
1	21	Cleveland Browns	Clifford Charlton	LB	Florida	
1	22	Houston Oilers	Lorenzo White ^{†}	RB	Michigan State	
1	23	Chicago Bears	Brad Muster	FB	Stanford	
1	24	New Orleans Saints	Craig Heyward ^{†}	FB	Pittsburgh	
1	25	Los Angeles Raiders	Scott Davis	DE	Illinois	from San Francisco (Note: No. 25: San Francisco → LA Raiders (D). San Francisco traded a first-round selection (25th overall) to the LA Raiders in exchange for second- and fourth-round selections (33rd and 102nd overall), and WR Dokie Williams.)
1	26	Denver Broncos	Ted Gregory	DT	Syracuse	
1	27	Chicago Bears	Wendell Davis	WR	LSU	from Washington (Note: No. 27: Washington → Chicago (PD). Washington sent a first-round selection (27th overall) and a 1989 first-round selection to Chicago as compensation for signing free agent LB Wilber Marshall.)
2	28	Atlanta Falcons	Marcus Cotton	LB	USC	
2	29	Detroit Lions	Chris Spielman ^{†}	LB	Ohio State	from Kansas City (Note: No. 29: Kansas City → Detroit (D). See Round 1: Detroit → Kansas City.)
2	30	Philadelphia Eagles	Eric Allen^{‡}^{†}	CB	Arizona State	from Tampa Bay (Note: No. 30: Tampa Bay → Philadelphia (D). Tampa Bay traded a second-round selection (30th overall) to Philadelphia in exchange for second- and fourth-round selections (39th and 83rd overall).)
2	31	Cincinnati Bengals	Ickey Woods ^{†}	RB	UNLV	
2	32	Detroit Lions	Pat Carter	TE	Florida State	
2	33	San Francisco 49ers	Danny Stubbs	LB	Miami (FL)	from LA Raiders (Note: No. 33: LA Raiders → San Francisco (D). See Round 1: San Francisco → LA Raiders.)
2	34	Green Bay Packers	Shawn Patterson	DE	Arizona State	
2	35	Los Angeles Rams	Anthony Newman	S	Oregon	
2	36	New York Giants	John Elliot ^{†}	T	Michigan	
2	37	New York Jets	Terry Williams	CB	Bethune–Cookman	
2	38	Phoenix Cardinals	Tony Jeffery	RB	TCU	
2	39	San Francisco 49ers	Pierce Holt ^{†}	DT	Angelo State	from Philadelphia via Tampa Bay (Note: No. 39: Philadelphia → Tampa Bay → San Francisco. Multiple trades: Philadelphia → Tampa Bay (D). See Round 2: Tampa Bay → Philadelphia. Tampa Bay → San Francisco (D). Tampa Bay traded a second-round selection (39th overall) to San Francisco in exchange for second- and fourth-round selections (53rd and 107th overall).)
2	40	Buffalo Bills	Thurman Thomas^{‡}^{†}	RB	Oklahoma State	
2	41	Dallas Cowboys	Ken Norton ^{†}	LB	UCLA	
2	42	Miami Dolphins	Jarvis Williams	S	Florida	
2	43	New England Patriots	Vincent Brown	LB	Mississippi Valley State	
2	44	Pittsburgh Steelers	Dermontti Dawson^{‡}^{†}	C	Kentucky	
2	45	Denver Broncos	Gerald Perry	T	Southern	from Minnesota (Note: No. 45: Minnesota → Denver (D). Minnesota traded its second-round selection (45th overall) to Denver in exchange for second-, fourth- and sixth-round selections (54th, 108th and 164th overall).)
2	46	Los Angeles Rams	Willie Anderson	WR	UCLA	from San Diego (Note: No. 46: San Diego → LA Rams (PD). San Diego traded its second-round selection (46th overall), a 1989 sixth-round selection and RB Buford McGee to the Rams in exchange for RB Barry Redden.)
2	47	Los Angeles Rams	Fred Strickland	LB	Purdue	from Indianapolis (Note: No. 47: Indianapolis → LA Rams (PD). See Round 1: Indianapolis → LA Rams.)
2	48	Houston Oilers	Quintin Jones	CB	Pittsburgh	from Houston via LA Raiders (Note: No. 48: Houston → LA Raiders → Houston. Multiple trades: Houston → LA Raiders (PD). Houston traded a second-round selection (48th overall) to the LA Raiders in exchange for OT Bruce Davis. LA Raiders → Houston (PD). See Round 1: Houston → LA Raiders.)
2	49	Seattle Seahawks	Brian Blades ^{†}	WR	Miami (FL)	
2	50	Cleveland Browns	Michael Dean Perry ^{†}	DT	Clemson	
2	51	Chicago Bears	Dante Jones	LB	Oklahoma	
2	52	New Orleans Saints	Brett Perriman	WR	Miami (FL)	
2	53	Tampa Bay Buccaneers	Lars Tate	RB	Georgia	from San Francisco (Note: No. 53: San Francisco → Tampa Bay (D). See Round 2: Tampa Bay → San Francisco.)
2	54	Minnesota Vikings	Brad Edwards	S	South Carolina	from Denver (Note: No. 54: Denver → Minnesota (D). See Round 2: Minnesota → Denver.)
2	55	Washington Redskins	Chip Lohmiller ^{†}	K	Minnesota	
3	56	Atlanta Falcons	Alex Higdon	TE	Ohio State	
3	–	Tampa Bay Buccaneers	Selection forfeited during the 1987 supplemental draft. (Note: Tampa Bay forfeited a third-round selection after selecting DT Dan Sileo in the 1987 supplemental draft.)			
3	57	Cincinnati Bengals	Kevin Walker	LB	Maryland	
3	58	Detroit Lions	Ray Roundtree	WR	Penn State	
3	59	Kansas City Chiefs	Kevin Porter	S	Auburn	
3	60	San Diego Chargers	Quinn Early	WR	Iowa	from LA Raiders via Houston (Note: No. 60: LA Raiders → Houston → San Diego. Multiple trades: LA Raiders → Houston (PD). See Round 1: Houston → LA Raiders. Houston → San Diego (D). Houston traded a third-round selection (60th overall) to San Diego in exchange for third- and fifth-round selections (72nd and 125th overall).)
3	61	Green Bay Packers	Keith Woodside	RB	Texas A&M	
3	62	New York Giants	Sheldon White	CB	Miami (OH)	
3	63	New York Jets	Erik McMillan ^{†}	S	Missouri	
3	64	Philadelphia Eagles	Matt Patchan	T	Miami (FL)	
3	65	Buffalo Bills	Bernard Ford	WR	UCF	
3	66	Washington Redskins	Mike Oliphant	RB	Puget Sound	from LA Rams (Note: No. 66: LA Rams → Washington (D). LA Rams traded its third-round selection (66th overall) to Washington in exchange for third-, fifth- and sixth-round selections (82nd, 137th and 165th overall).)
3	67	Dallas Cowboys	Mark Hutson	G	Oklahoma	
3	68	Phoenix Cardinals	Tom Tupa ^{†}	QB/P	Ohio State	
3	69	New England Patriots	Tom Rehder	T	Notre Dame	
3	70	Pittsburgh Steelers	Chuck Lanza	C	Notre Dame	
3	71	Minnesota Vikings	Al Noga	DE	Hawaii	
3	72	Houston Oilers	Greg Montgomery ^{†}	P	Michigan State	from San Diego (Note: No. 72: San Diego → Houston (D). See Round 3: Houston → San Diego.)
3	73	Miami Dolphins	Ferrell Edmunds ^{†}	TE	Maryland	
3	74	New York Jets	James Hasty ^{†}	CB	Washington State	from Houston via LA Raiders (Note: No. 74: Houston → LA Raiders → NY Jets. Multiple trades: Houston → LA Raiders (PD). See Round 1: Houston → LA Raiders. LA Raiders → NY Jets (D). The LA Raiders traded a third-round selection (74th overall) to the NY Jets in exchange for fourth- and fifth-round selections (90th and 131st overall).)
3	75	Seattle Seahawks	Tommy Kane	WR	Syracuse	
3	76	Indianapolis Colts	Chris Chandler ^{†}	QB	Washington	
3	77	Cleveland Browns	Van Waiters	LB	Indiana	
3	78	Chicago Bears	Ralph Jarvis	DE	Temple	
3	79	Denver Broncos	Kevin Guidry	CB	LSU	from New Orleans (Note: No. 79: New Orleans → Denver (D). New Orleans traded its third-round selection (79th overall) to Denver in exchange for third- and tenth-round selections (81st and 276th overall).)
3	80	San Francisco 49ers	Bill Romanowski ^{†}	LB	Boston College	
3	81	New Orleans Saints	Tony Stephens	DT	Clemson	from Denver (Note: No. 81: Denver → New Orleans (D). See Round 3: New Orleans → Denver.)
3	82	Los Angeles Rams	Mike Piel	DE	Illinois	from Washington (Note: No. 82: Washington → LA Rams (D). See Round 3: LA Rams → Washington.)
4	83	Tampa Bay Buccaneers	Robert Goff	DE	Auburn	from Atlanta via Philadelphia (Note: No. 83: Atlanta → Philadelphia → Tampa Bay. Multiple trades: Atlanta → Philadelphia (PD). Atlanta traded its fourth-round selection (83rd overall) to Philadelphia in exchange for DE Leonard Mitchell. Philadelphia → Tampa Bay (D). See Round 2: Tampa Bay → Philadelphia.)
4	84	Cincinnati Bengals	David Grant	DE	West Virginia	
4	85	Detroit Lions	William White	S	Ohio State	
4	86	Tampa Bay Buccaneers	John Bruhin	G	Tennessee	from Kansas City (Note: No. 86: Kansas City → Tampa Bay (PD). Kansas City traded its fourth- and eighth-round selections (86th and 198th overall), and S Mark Robinson to Tampa Bay in exchange for QB Steve DeBerg.)
4	87	New England Patriots	Tim Goad	DT	North Carolina	from Green Bay (Note: No. 87: Tampa Bay → New England (PD). Tampa Bay traded its fourth-round selection (87th overall) to New England in exchange for a 1987 fifth-round selection.)
4	88	Green Bay Packers	Rollin Putzier	DT	Oregon	from LA Raiders (Note: No. 88: LA Raiders → Green Bay (PD). The LA Raiders traded a fourth-round selection (88th overall) and a 1987 third-round selection (71st overall) to Green Bay in exchange for WR James Lofton.)
4	89	Green Bay Packers	Chuck Cecil ^{†}	S	Arizona	
4	90	Los Angeles Raiders	Tim Rother	T	Nebraska	from NY Jets (Note: No. 90: NY Jets → LA Raiders (D). See Round 3: LA Raiders → NY Jets.)
4	91	San Diego Chargers	Joe Campbell	LB	New Mexico State	from LA Rams (Note: No. 91: LA Rams → San Diego (PD). LA Rams traded its fourth-round selection (91st overall) to San Diego in exchange for TE Pete Holohan.)
4	92	New York Giants	Ricky Shaw	LB	Oklahoma State	
4	93	San Diego Chargers	Stacy Searels	T	Auburn	from Buffalo (Note: No. 93: Buffalo → San Diego (PD). Buffalo traded its fourth-round selection (93rd overall) and LB David Brandon to San Diego in exchange for a seventh-round selection (184th overall) and WR Trumaine Johnson.)
4	94	Dallas Cowboys	Dave Widell	G	Boston College	
4	95	Phoenix Cardinals	Mike Brim	CB	Virginia Union	
4	–	Philadelphia Eagles	Selection forfeited during the 1987 supplemental draft. (Note: Philadelphia forfeited a fourth-round selection after selecting WR Cris Carter in the 1987 supplemental draft.)			
4	96	Kansas City Chiefs	J. R. Ambrose	WR	Ole Miss	from Pittsburgh (Note: No. 96: Pittsburgh → Kansas City (PD). Pittsburgh traded its fourth-round selection (96th overall) to Kansas City in exchange for QB Todd Blackledge.)
4	97	New England Patriots	Sammy Martin	WR	LSU	from Minnesota (Note: No. 97: Minnesota → New England (PD). Minnesota traded its fourth- and eleventh-round selections (97th and 294th overall) to New England in exchange for the rights to QB Rich Gannon, originally drafted by New England.)
4	98	San Diego Chargers	David Richards	G	UCLA	
4	99	Miami Dolphins	Greg Johnson	G	Oklahoma	
4	100	New England Patriots	Teddy Garcia	K	Northeast Louisiana	
4	101	Seattle Seahawks	Kevin Harmon	RB	Iowa	
4	102	San Francisco 49ers	Barry Helton	P	Colorado	from Houston via LA Raiders (Note: No. 102: Houston → LA Raiders → San Francisco. Multiple trades: Houston → LA Raiders (PD). See Round 1: Houston → LA Raiders. LA Raiders → San Francisco (D). See Round 1: San Francisco → LA Raiders.)
4	103	Cleveland Browns	Anthony Blaylock	CB	Winston-Salem State	
4	104	Indianapolis Colts	Michael Ball	CB	Southern	
4	105	Chicago Bears	Jim Thornton	TE	Cal State Fullerton	
4	106	New Orleans Saints	Lydell Carr	RB	Oklahoma	
4	107	Tampa Bay Buccaneers	Monte Robbins	P	Michigan	from San Francisco (Note: No. 107: San Francisco → Tampa Bay (D). See Round 2: Tampa Bay → San Francisco.)
4	108	Minnesota Vikings	Todd Kalis	G	Arizona State	from Denver (Note: No. 54: Denver → Minnesota (D). See Round 2: Minnesota → Denver.)
4	109	Washington Redskins	Jamie Morris	RB	Michigan	
5	110	Atlanta Falcons	Charles Dimry	CB	UNLV	
5	111	Detroit Lions	Eric Andolsek	G	LSU	
5	112	New Orleans Saints	Greg Scales	TE	Wake Forest	from Kansas City (Note: No. 112: Kansas City → New Orleans (PD). Kansas City traded its fifth-round selection (112th overall) to New Orleans in exchange for LB Jack Del Rio.)
5	113	Tampa Bay Buccaneers	William Howard	RB	Tennessee	
5	114	Cincinnati Bengals	Troy Wester	T	Iowa	
5	115	New England Patriots	Troy Wolkow	G	Minnesota	from LA Raiders (Note: No. 115: LA Raiders → New England (PD). The LA Raiders traded a fifth-round selection (115th overall) to New England in exchange for OT Brian Holloway.)
5	116	Green Bay Packers	Darrell Reed	LB	Oklahoma	
5	117	Los Angeles Rams	Robert Delpino	RB	Missouri	
5	118	New York Giants	Jon Carter	DE	Pittsburgh	
5	119	New York Jets	Mike Withycombe	G	Fresno State	
5	120	Phoenix Cardinals	Chris Gaines	LB	Vanderbilt	from Dallas via Seattle (Note: No. 120: Dallas → Seattle → Phoenix. Multiple trades: Dallas → Seattle (PD). Dallas traded its fifth-round selection (120th overall) to Seattle in exchange for OT Ron Essink. Seattle → Phoenix (PD). Seattle traded a fifth-round selection (120th overall), and 1989 first- and fifth-round selections to Phoenix in exchange for the rights to QB Kelly Stouffer.)
5	121	Pittsburgh Steelers	Darin Jordan	LB	Northeastern	from Phoenix (Note: No. 121: Phoenix → Pittsburgh (PD). Phoenix traded its fifth-round selection (121st overall) to Pittsburgh in exchange for QB Cliff Stoudt.)
5	122	Philadelphia Eagles	Eric Everett	CB	Texas Tech	
5	123	Buffalo Bills	Ezekial Gadson	DB	Pittsburgh	
5	124	Minnesota Vikings	Darrell Fullington	S	Miami (FL)	
5	125	Houston Oilers	Cris Dishman ^{†}	CB	Purdue	from San Diego (Note: No. 125: San Diego → Houston (D). See Round 3: Houston → San Diego.)
5	126	Miami Dolphins	Rodney Thomas	CB	BYU	
5	127	Washington Redskins	Carl Mims	DB	Sam Houston State	from New England (Note: No. 127: New England → Washington (D). New England traded its fifth-round selection (127th overall) to Washington in exchange for a 1989 fourth-round selection.)
5	128	Pittsburgh Steelers	Jerry Reese	DE	Kentucky	
5	129	Indianapolis Colts	John Baylor	CB	Southern Miss	
5	130	Houston Oilers	Chris Verhulst	TE	Chico State	
5	131	Los Angeles Raiders	Dennis Price	CB	UCLA	from Seattle via San Francisco and NY Jets (Note: No. 131: Seattle → San Francisco → NY Jets → LA Raiders. Multiple trades: Seattle → San Francisco (PD). Seattle traded its fifth-round selection (131st overall) to San Francisco in exchange for QB Jeff Kemp. San Francisco → NY Jets (PD). San Francisco traded a fifth-round selection (131st overall) and LB Onzy Elam to the NY Jets in exchange for WR Lam Jones. NY Jets → LA Raiders (D). See Round 3: LA Raiders → NY Jets.)
5	132	Phoenix Cardinals	Tony Jordan	RB	Kansas State	from Cleveland (Note: No. 132: Cleveland → Phoenix (PD). Cleveland traded its fifth-round selection (132nd overall) to Phoenix in exchange for DE Al Baker.)
5	133	Chicago Bears	Troy Johnson	LB	Oklahoma	
5	134	New Orleans Saints	Keith Taylor	S	Illinois	
5	135	Buffalo Bills	Kirk Roach	K	Western Carolina	from San Francisco (Note: No. 135: San Francisco → Buffalo (PD). San Francisco traded a fifth-round selection (135th overall) and a 1987 third-round selection to Buffalo in exchange for RB Joe Cribbs.)
5	136	Denver Broncos	Corris Ervin	DB	UCF	
5	137	Los Angeles Rams	James Washington	S	UCLA	from Washington (Note: No. 137: Washington → LA Rams (D). See Round 3: LA Rams → Washington.)
6	138	Atlanta Falcons	George Thomas	WR	UNLV	
6	139	Kansas City Chiefs	James Saxon	RB	San Jose State	
6	140	Atlanta Falcons	Houston Hoover	G	Jackson State	from Tampa Bay (Note: No. 140: Tampa Bay → Atlanta (PD). Tampa Bay traded its sixth-round selection (140th overall) to Atlanta in exchange for RB Cliff Austin.)
6	141	Cincinnati Bengals	Paul Jetton	C	Texas	
6	142	Detroit Lions	Carl Painter	RB	Hampton	
6	143	Los Angeles Raiders	Erwin Grabisna	LB	Case Western Reserve	
6	144	Green Bay Packers	Nate Hill	DE	Auburn	
6	145	New York Giants	David Houle	G	Michigan State	
6	146	New York Jets	Paul Frase	DT	Syracuse	
6	147	Los Angeles Rams	Keith Jones	RB	Nebraska	
6	148	Phoenix Cardinals	Jon Phillips	G	Oklahoma	
6	149	Philadelphia Eagles	Don McPherson	QB	Syracuse	
6	150	Buffalo Bills	Dan Murray	LB	East Stroudsburg	
6	151	Dallas Cowboys	Scott Secules	QB	Virginia	
6	152	San Diego Chargers	Cedric Figaro	LB	Notre Dame	
6	153	Miami Dolphins	Mel Bratton	RB	Miami (FL)	
6	154	New England Patriots	Steve Johnson	TE	Virginia Tech	
6	155	Pittsburgh Steelers	Warren Williams	RB	Miami (FL)	
6	156	Miami Dolphins	George Cooper	RB	Ohio State	from Minnesota (Note: No. 156: Minnesota → Miami (PD). Minnesota traded its sixth-round selection (156th overall) and a 1989 tenth-round selection to Miami in exchange for OT Greg Koch.)
6	157	Houston Oilers	Kurt Crain	LB	Auburn	
6	158	Seattle Seahawks	Roy Hart	DT	South Carolina	
6	159	Washington Redskins	Stan Humphries	QB	Northeast Louisiana	from Indianapolis (Note: No. 159: Indianapolis → Washington (PD). Indianapolis traded its sixth-round selection (159th overall) to Washington in exchange for WR/PR Clarence Verdin.)
6	160	Philadelphia Eagles	Rob Sterling	DB	Maine	from Cleveland (Note: No. 160: Cleveland → Philadelphia (PD). Cleveland traded its sixth-round selection (160th overall) and DB D. D. Hoggard to Philadelphia in exchange for DT Chris Pike.)
6	161	Chicago Bears	Lemuel Stinson	CB	Texas Tech	
6	162	New Orleans Saints	Bob Sims	G	Florida	
6	163	Tampa Bay Buccaneers	Shawn Lee	DT	North Alabama	from San Francisco (Note: No. 163: San Francisco → Tampa Bay (PD). San Francisco traded its sixth-round selection (163rd overall) to Tampa Bay in exchange for DE Keith Browner.)
6	164	Minnesota Vikings	Derrick White	DB	Oklahoma	from Denver (Note: No. 164: Denver → Minnesota (D). See Round 2: Minnesota → Denver.)
6	165	Los Angeles Rams	Jeff Knapton	DT	Wyoming	from Washington (Note: No. 165: Washington → LA Rams (D). See Round 3: LA Rams → Washington.)
7	166	Atlanta Falcons	Michael Haynes	WR	Northern Arizona	
7	167	Tampa Bay Buccaneers	Kerry Goode	RB	Alabama	
7	168	Cincinnati Bengals	Rich Romer	LB	Union (NY)	
7	169	Detroit Lions	Jeff James	WR	Stanford	
7	170	Kansas City Chiefs	Troy Stedman	LB	Washburn	
7	171	Los Angeles Raiders	Derrick Crudup	S	Oklahoma	
7	172	New York Jets	Gary Patton	RB	Eastern Michigan	
7	173	Green Bay Packers	Gary Richard	DB	Pittsburgh	
7	174	Denver Broncos	Pat Kelly	TE	Syracuse	from LA Rams (Note: No. 174: LA Rams → Denver (PD). The LA Rams traded a seventh-round selection (174th overall) and a 1987 eleventh-round selection to Denver in exchange for LB Steve Busick.)
7	175	New York Giants	Mike Perez	QB	San Jose State	
7	176	Philadelphia Eagles	Todd White	WR	Cal State Fullerton	
7	177	Buffalo Bills	Tim Borcky	T	Memphis State	
7	178	Dallas Cowboys	Owen Hooven	T	Oregon State	
7	179	Phoenix Cardinals	Ernie Jones	WR	Indiana	
7	180	Miami Dolphins	Kerwin Bell	QB	Florida	
7	181	New England Patriots	Darryl Usher	WR	Illinois	
7	182	Pittsburgh Steelers	Marc Zeno	WR	Tulane	
7	183	Minnesota Vikings	Brad Beckman	TE	Nebraska–Omaha	
7	184	Buffalo Bills	Bo Wright	RB	Alabama	from San Diego (Note: No. 184: San Diego → Buffalo (D). See Round 4: Buffalo → San Diego.)
7	185	Seattle Seahawks	Ray Jackson	DB	Ohio State	
7	186	New York Giants	Danta Whitaker	TE	Mississippi Valley State	from Indianapolis (Note: No. 186: Indianapolis → NY Giants (PD). Indianapolis traded its seventh-round selection (186th overall) to the NY Giants in exchange for DT Jerome Sally.)
7	187	Houston Oilers	Tracey Eaton	S	Portland State	
7	188	Cleveland Browns	Thane Gash	DB	East Tennessee State	
7	189	Chicago Bears	Caesar Rentie	T	Oklahoma	
7	190	New Orleans Saints	Brian Forde	LB	Washington State	
7	191	San Francisco 49ers	Kevin Bryant	LB	Delaware State	
7	192	Denver Broncos	Garry Frank	G	Mississippi State	
7	193	Washington Redskins	Harold Hicks	DB	San Diego State	
8	194	Atlanta Falcons	Phillip Brown	LB	Alabama	
8	195	Cincinnati Bengals	Curtis Maxey	DT	Grambling State	
8	196	Detroit Lions	Gary Hadd	DT	Minnesota	
8	197	Kansas City Chiefs	Alfredo Roberts	TE	Miami (FL)	
8	198	Tampa Bay Buccaneers	Anthony Simpson	RB	East Carolina	from Tampa Bay via Kansas City (Note: No. 198: Tampa Bay → Kansas City → Tampa Bay. Multiple trades: Tampa Bay → Kansas City (PD). Tampa Bay traded an eighth-round selection (198th overall) to Kansas City in exchange for RB Jeff Smith. Kansas City → Tampa Bay (PD). See Round 4: Kansas City → Tampa Bay.)
8	199	Los Angeles Raiders	Mike Alexander	WR	Penn State	
8	200	Green Bay Packers	Patrick Collins	RB	Oklahoma	
8	201	Los Angeles Rams	Darryl Franklin	WR	Washington	
8	202	New York Giants	Sammy Lilly	CB	Georgia Tech	
8	203	New York Jets	Keith Neubert	TE	Nebraska	
8	204	Buffalo Bills	John Hagy	S	Texas	
8	205	Dallas Cowboys	Mark Higgs	RB	Kentucky	
8	206	Phoenix Cardinals	Tim Moore	LB	Michigan State	
8	207	Philadelphia Eagles	David Smith	RB	Western Kentucky	
8	208	Chicago Bears	David Tate	DB	Colorado	from New England (Note: No. 208: New England → Chicago (PD). New England traded an eighth-round selection (208th overall) to Chicago in exchange for QB Doug Flutie.)
8	209	Pittsburgh Steelers	Mark Nichols	DT	Michigan State	
8	210	Minnesota Vikings	Joe Cain	LB	Oregon Tech	
8	211	Pittsburgh Steelers	Mike Hinnant	TE	Temple	from San Diego (Note: No. 211: San Diego → Pittsburgh (PD). San Diego traded an eighth-round selection (211th overall) and a conditional 1989 selection to Pittsburgh in exchange for QB Mark Malone.)
8	212	Miami Dolphins	Harry Galbreath	G	Tennessee	
8	213	Buffalo Bills	Jeff Wright	DT	Central Missouri State	from Indianapolis (Note: No. 213: Indianapolis → Buffalo (PD). Indianapolis traded an eighth-round selection (213th overall) to Buffalo in exchange for a 1987 eighth-round selection.)
8	214	Houston Oilers	David Viaene	T	Minnesota Duluth	
8	215	Seattle Seahawks	Robert Tyler	TE	South Carolina State	
8	216	Cleveland Browns	J. J. Birden	WR	Oregon	
8	217	Chicago Bears	Harvey Reed	RB	Howard	
8	218	New Orleans Saints	Glenn Derby	G	Wisconsin	
8	219	San Francisco 49ers	Larry Clarkson	T	Montana	
8	220	Miami Dolphins	Louis Cheek	T	Texas A&M	from Denver (Note: No. 220: Denver → Miami (PD). Denver traded an eighth-round selection (220th overall) to Miami in exchange for C Larry Lee.)
8	221	Washington Redskins	Darryl McGill	RB	Wake Forest	
9	222	Atlanta Falcons	James Primus	RB	UCLA	
9	223	Detroit Lions	Kip Corrington	S	Texas A&M	
9	224	Kansas City Chiefs	Azizuddin Abdur-Ra'Oof	WR	Maryland	
9	225	Tampa Bay Buccaneers	Reuben Davis	DE	North Carolina	
9	226	Cincinnati Bengals	Brandy Wells	DB	Notre Dame	
9	227	Los Angeles Raiders	Reggie Ware	RB	Auburn	
9	228	Green Bay Packers	Neal Wilkinson	TE	James Madison	
9	229	Los Angeles Raiders	Scott Tabor	P	California	from NY Giants (Note: No. 229: NY Giants → LA Raiders (PD). The NY Giants traded a ninth-round selection (229th overall) to the LA Raiders in exchange for two 1987 twelfth-round selections.)
9	230	New York Jets	Ralph Tamm	G	West Chester	
9	231	Los Angeles Rams	Pat Foster	DT	Montana	
9	232	Dallas Cowboys	Brian Bedford	WR	California	
9	233	Phoenix Cardinals	Scott Dill	T	Memphis State	
9	234	Detroit Lions	Todd Irvin	T	Ole Miss	from Philadelphia (Note: No. 234: Philadelphia → Detroit (PD). Philadelphia traded a ninth-round selection (234th overall) to Detroit in exchange for TE Jimmie Giles.)
9	235	Buffalo Bills	Carlton Bailey	LB	North Carolina	
9	236	Pittsburgh Steelers	Gordon Lockbaum	RB	Holy Cross	
9	237	Minnesota Vikings	Paul McGowan	LB	Florida State	
9	238	San Diego Chargers	Joey Howard	T	Tennessee	
9	239	Miami Dolphins	Jeff Cross ^{†}	DE	Missouri	
9	240	New England Patriots	Neil Galbraith	DB	Central State (OK)	
9	241	Houston Oilers	David Spradlin	LB	TCU	
9	242	Seattle Seahawks	Deatrich Wise	DT	Jackson State	
9	243	Indianapolis Colts	Jeff Herrod	LB	Ole Miss	
9	244	Cleveland Browns	Danny Copeland	DB	Eastern Kentucky	
9	245	Chicago Bears	Rogie Magee	WR	LSU	
9	246	New Orleans Saints	Clarence Nunn	DB	San Diego State	
9	247	San Francisco 49ers	Brian Bonner	LB	Minnesota	
9	248	Denver Broncos	Mel Farr Jr.	RB	UCLA	
9	249	Washington Redskins	Blake Peterson	LB	Mesa	
10	250	Atlanta Falcons	Stan Clayton	G	Penn State	
10	251	Kansas City Chiefs	Kenny Gamble	RB	Colgate	
10	252	Pittsburgh Steelers	John Jackson	T	Eastern Kentucky	from Tampa Bay (Note: No. 252: Tampa Bay → Pittsburgh (PD). Tampa Bay traded a tenth-round selection (252nd overall) to Pittsburgh in exchange for DB Rick Woods.)
10	253	Cincinnati Bengals	Ellis Dillahunt	DB	East Carolina	
10	254	Detroit Lions	Paco Craig	WR	UCLA	
10	255	Los Angeles Raiders	Newt Harrell	T	West Texas State	
10	256	Green Bay Packers	Bud Keyes	QB	Wisconsin	
10	257	New York Jets	John Booty	DB	TCU	
10	258	Los Angeles Rams	R. C. Mullin	T	Southwestern Louisiana	
10	259	New York Giants	Eric Hickerson	DB	Indiana	
10	260	Phoenix Cardinals	Andy Schillinger	WR	Miami (OH)	
10	261	Philadelphia Eagles	Joe Schuster	DT	Iowa	
10	262	Buffalo Bills	Martin Mayhew	CB	Florida State	
10	263	Dallas Cowboys	Billy Owens	DB	Pittsburgh	
10	264	Minnesota Vikings	Brian Habib	G	Washington	
10	265	New York Giants	Steve Wilkes	TE	Appalachian State	from San Diego (Note: No. 265: San Diego → NY Giants (PD). San Diego traded a tenth-round selection (265th overall) to the NY Giants in exchange for WR Bobby Johnson.)
10	266	Miami Dolphins	Artis Jackson	DT	Texas Tech	
10	267	New England Patriots	Rodney Lossow	C	Wisconsin	from LA Raiders (Note: No. 267: LA Raiders → New England (PD). The LA Raiders traded a tenth-round selection (267th overall) and a 1989 seventh-round selection to New England in exchange for OT Brian Holloway.)
10	268	Denver Broncos	Channing Williams	RB	Arizona State	from Pittsburgh (Note: No. 268: Pittsburgh → Denver (PD). Pittsburgh traded a tenth-round selection (268th overall) to Denver in exchange for LB Ken Woodard.)
10	269	Seattle Seahawks	Derwin Jones	DE	Miami (FL)	
10	270	Indianapolis Colts	O'Brien Alston	LB	Maryland	
10	271	Houston Oilers	Marco Johnson	WR	Hawaii	
10	272	Cleveland Browns	Brian Washington	DB	Nebraska	
10	273	Chicago Bears	Joel Porter	G	Baylor	
10	274	New Orleans Saints	Todd Santos	QB	San Diego State	
10	275	San Francisco 49ers	Tim Foley	K	Georgia Southern	
10	276	New Orleans Saints	Vincent Fizer	LB	Southern	from Denver (Note: No. 276: Denver → New Orleans (D). See Round 3: New Orleans → Denver.)
10	277	Washington Redskins	Henry Brown	DE	Ohio State	
11	278	Atlanta Falcons	James Milling	WR	Maryland	
11	279	Tampa Bay Buccaneers	Frank Pillow	WR	Tennessee State	
11	280	Cincinnati Bengals	Paul Hickert	K	Murray State	
11	281	Detroit Lions	Danny McCoin	QB	Cincinnati	
11	282	Kansas City Chiefs	Danny McManus	QB	Florida State	
11	283	Los Angeles Raiders	David Weber	QB	Carroll (WI)	
11	284	Seattle Seahawks	Rick McLeod	T	Washington	from Green Bay (Note: No. 284: Green Bay → Seattle (PD). Green Bay traded an eleventh-round selection (284th overall) to Seattle in exchange for CB Dave Brown.)
11	285	San Diego Chargers	Ed Miller	C	Pittsburgh	from LA Rams (Note: No. 285: LA Rams → San Diego (PD). The LA Rams traded an eleventh-round selection (285th overall) to San Diego in exchange for OL Jeff Walker.)
11	286	New York Giants	Greg Harris	WR	Troy State	
11	287	New York Jets	John Galvin	LB	Boston College	
11	288	Philadelphia Eagles	Izel Jenkins	CB	NC State	
11	289	Buffalo Bills	Pete Curkendall	DT	Penn State	
11	290	Dallas Cowboys	Chad Hennings	DT	Air Force	
11	291	Phoenix Cardinals	Keith McCoy	DB	Fresno State	
11	292	Miami Dolphins	Tom Kelleher	RB	Holy Cross	
11	293	San Diego Chargers	George Hinkle	DE	Arizona	
11	294	New England Patriots	Marvin Allen	RB	Tulane	from Minnesota (Note: No. 294: Minnesota → New England (PD). See Round 4: Minnesota → New England.)
11	295	Pittsburgh Steelers	Bobby Dawson	DB	Illinois	
11	296	Minnesota Vikings	Norman Floyd	DB	South Carolina	from New England (Note: No. 296: New England → Minnesota (D). New England traded an eleventh-round selection (296th overall) to Minnesota in exchange for a 1989 ninth-round selection.)
11	297	Indianapolis Colts	Donnie Dee	TE	Tulsa	
11	298	Houston Oilers	Jethro Franklin	DE	Fresno State	
11	299	Seattle Seahawks	Dwayne Harper	CB	South Carolina State	
11	300	Cleveland Browns	Hendley Hawkins	WR	Nebraska	
11	301	Chicago Bears	Steve Forch	LB	Nebraska	
11	302	New Orleans Saints	Gary Couch	WR	Minnesota	
11	303	San Francisco 49ers	Chet Brooks	S	Texas A&M	
11	304	Denver Broncos	Shaun Grady	RB	Duke	
11	305	Washington Redskins	Curt Koch	DE	Colorado	
12	306	Atlanta Falcons	Carter Wiley	DB	Virginia Tech	
12	307	Cincinnati Bengals	Carl Parker	WR	Vanderbilt	
12	308	Indianapolis Colts	Aatron Kenney	WR	Wisconsin–Stevens Point	from Detroit (Note: No. 308: Detroit → Indianapolis (PD). Detroit traded a twelfth-round selection (308th overall) to Indianapolis in exchange for TE Derrick Ramsey.)
12	309	Buffalo Bills	John Driscoll	T	New Hampshire	from Kansas City (Note: No. 309: Kansas City → Buffalo (PD). Kansas City traded a twelfth-round selection (309th overall) to Buffalo in exchange for CB Charles Romes.)
12	310	Tampa Bay Buccaneers	Victor Jones	LB	Virginia Tech	
12	311	Los Angeles Raiders	Greg Kunkel	G	Kentucky	
12	312	Green Bay Packers	Scott Bolton	WR	Auburn	
12	313	New York Giants	David Futrell	DT	BYU	
12	314	New York Jets	Albert Goss	DT	Jackson State	
12	315	Washington Redskins	Wayne Ross	P	San Diego State	from LA Rams (Note: No. 315: LA Rams → Washington (D). The LA Rams traded a twelfth-round selection (315th overall) to Washington in exchange for a twelfth-round selection (333rd overall) and a 1989 eleventh-round selection.)
12	316	Buffalo Bills	Tom Erlandson	LB	Washington	
12	317	Dallas Cowboys	Ben Hummel	LB	UCLA	
12	318	Phoenix Cardinals	Chris Carrier	DB	LSU	
12	319	Philadelphia Eagles	Steve Kaufusi	DE	BYU	
12	320	Miami Dolphins	Brian Kinchen	TE	LSU	
12	321	New England Patriots	Dave Nugent	DT	Boston College	
12	322	Pittsburgh Steelers	James Earle	LB	Clemson	
12	323	New York Giants	Brendan McCormack	DT	South Carolina	from Minnesota (Note: No. 323: Minnesota → NY Giants (PD). Minnesota traded a conditional twelfth-round selection (323rd overall) to the NY Giants in exchange for C Chris Foote.)
12	324	San Diego Chargers	Wendell Phillips	DB	North Alabama	
12	325	Houston Oilers	John Brantley	LB	Georgia	
12	326	Seattle Seahawks	Dave DesRochers	T	San Diego State	
12	327	Indianapolis Colts	Tim Vesling	K	Syracuse	
12	328	Cleveland Browns	Steve Slayden	QB	Duke	
12	329	Chicago Bears	Greg Clark	LB	Arizona State	
12	330	New Orleans Saints	Paul Jurgensen	DE	Georgia Tech	
12	331	San Francisco 49ers	George Mira Jr.	LB	Miami (FL)	
12	332	Denver Broncos	Johnny Carter	DT	https://en.wikipedia.org/wiki/Grambling_State_Tigers_football	
12	333	Los Angeles Rams	Jeff Beathard	WR	Southern Oregon	from Washington (Note: No. 333: Washington → LA Rams (D). See Round 12: LA Rams → Washington.)

== Supplemental draft ==
Rnd.	Pick	Team	Player	Pos.	College	Notes
5	—	Minnesota Vikings	Ryan Bethea	DB	South Carolina	

== Notable undrafted players ==
†	Pro Bowler

Original NFL team	Player	Pos.	College	Notes
Atlanta Falcons	Vinson Smith	LB	East Carolina	
Chicago Bears	Brent Novoselsky	TE	Penn	
Chicago Bears	Mickey Pruitt	LB	Colorado	
Chicago Bears	John Shannon	DE	Kentucky	
Chicago Bears	Curtis Stewart	RB	Auburn	
Cleveland Browns	Tony Jones ^{†}	T	Western Carolina	
Dallas Cowboys	Sanjay Beach	WR	Colorado State	
Dallas Cowboys	John Garrett	WR	Princeton	
Dallas Cowboys	Zefross Moss	G	Alabama State	
Denver Broncos	Jeff Alexander	RB	Southern	
Denver Broncos	Jason Johnson	WR	Illinois State	
Denver Broncos	David Treadwell ^{†}	K	Clemson	
Indianapolis Colts	Dan Stryzinski	P	Indiana	
Los Angeles Raiders	Mike Dyal	TE	Texas A&M–Kingsville	
Los Angeles Rams	Brett Faryniarz	LB	San Diego State	
Miami Dolphins	Shawn Beals	WR	Idaho State	
Miami Dolphins	Selwyn Brown	DB	Miami	
New England Patriots	Jeff Feagles ^{†}	P	Miami	
New England Patriots	Howard Feggins	CB	North Carolina	
Philadelphia Eagles	Scott Curtis	LB	New Hampshire	
Philadelphia Eagles	John Talley	WR/TE	West Virginia	
Pittsburgh Steelers	Greg Lee	CB	Arkansas State	
Pittsburgh Steelers	Jeff Markland	TE	Illinois	
Pittsburgh Steelers	Rick Strom	QB	Georgia Tech	
San Diego Chargers	Darren Flutie	WR	Boston College	
San Diego Chargers	Paul McJulien	P	Jackson State	
San Diego Chargers	Rick Tuten ^{†}	P	Florida State	
San Diego Chargers	Ronnie Williams	TE	Oklahoma State	
San Francisco 49ers	Greg Cox	S	San Jose State	
Seattle Seahawks	Richard Cooper	T	Tennessee	
Seattle Seahawks	Darrin Miller	LB	Tennessee	
Seattle Seahawks	Rufus Porter ^{†}	LB	Southern	
Tampa Bay Buccaneers	Sidney Coleman	LB	Southern Miss	
Tampa Bay Buccaneers	Odie Harris	CB	Sam Houston State	
Washington Redskins	Dave Harbour	C	Illinois	
Washington Redskins	Todd Krumm	S	Michigan State	
Washington Redskins	Greg Manusky	LB	Colgate	
Washington Redskins	Robb White	DE	South Dakota	

== Hall of Famers ==
- Michael Irvin, wide receiver from Miami, taken 1st round 11th overall by Dallas Cowboys

Inducted: Professional Football Hall of Fame class of 2007

- Randall McDaniel, offensive guard from Arizona State, taken 1st round 19th overall by Minnesota Vikings

Inducted: Professional Football Hall of Fame class of 2009

- Thurman Thomas, running back from Oklahoma State, taken 2nd round 40th overall by Buffalo Bills

Inducted: Professional Football Hall of Fame class of 2007

- Dermontti Dawson, center from Kentucky, taken 2nd round 44th overall by Pittsburgh Steelers

Inducted: Professional Football Hall of Fame class of 2012

- Tim Brown, wide receiver from Notre Dame, taken 1st round 6th overall by Los Angeles Raiders

Inducted: Professional Football Hall of Fame class of 2015

- Sterling Sharpe, wide receiver from South Carolina, taken 1st round 7th overall by Green Bay Packers

Inducted: Professional Football Hall of Fame class of 2025

- Eric Allen, cornerback from Arizona State, taken 2nd round 30th overall by Philadelphia Eagles

Inducted: Professional Football Hall of Fame class of 2025

== Trades ==
In the explanations below, (D) denotes trades that took place during the 1988 Draft, while (PD) indicates trades completed pre-draft.

Round 1

Round 2

Round 3

Round 4

Round 5

Round 6

Round 7

Round 8

Round 9

Round 10

Round 11

Round 12

== Forfeited picks ==
Three selections in the 1988 draft were forfeited:
