= All-American Bowl =

All-American Bowl (defunct)
- Stadium: Legion Field
- Location: Birmingham, Alabama
- Operated: 1977–1990

Former names
- Hall of Fame Classic (1977–1984)

The All-American Bowl was an annual postseason college football bowl game played at Legion Field in Birmingham, Alabama, from 1977 to 1990. The game was known as the Hall of Fame Classic from 1977 to 1984.

In 1986, the National Football Foundation and College Hall of Fame decided to relocate the Hall of Fame bowl game to Tampa, Florida, where it eventually became known as the Outback Bowl (now the ReliaQuest Bowl). The game in Birmingham continued as the All-American Bowl, which was played for five years under a different organizing body.

When the Southeastern Conference expanded to twelve schools and began contesting a SEC Championship Game in 1992, Birmingham officials chose to host the conference title game and abandon the All-American Bowl. The SEC championship was moved to Atlanta's Georgia Dome two years later, leaving Legion Field without any Division I-A postseason college football until 2006, when ESPN and the city agreed to establish a new post-season game, the Birmingham Bowl.

== The game ==
The All-American Bowl played host to a number of successful teams from the premier college football conferences of the time (the Atlantic Coast Conference, Big Eight (now Big 12 Conference), Big Ten Conference, Southeastern Conference and Southwest Conference). All of them placed teams in the All-American Bowl in various years. At least one of the power conferences fielded teams in the All-American Bowl in every year of its existence; often, two of those premier conferences met in the game. The Southeastern Conference and Atlantic Coast Conference each placed five teams into the All-American Bowl. The Big Ten Conference proved to be the least successful conference, having never won a game despite placing teams in four different years.

== Game results ==
Date	Bowl Name	Winning Team		Losing Team		Attendance	Source
December 22, 1977	Hall of Fame Classic	Maryland	17	Minnesota	7	47,000	
December 20, 1978	Hall of Fame Classic	Texas A&M	28	#19 Iowa State	12	41,150	
December 29, 1979	Hall of Fame Classic	Missouri	24	#16 South Carolina	14	62,785	
December 27, 1980	Hall of Fame Classic	Arkansas	34	Tulane	15	30,000	
December 31, 1981	Hall of Fame Classic	Mississippi State	10	Kansas	0	41,672	
December 31, 1982	Hall of Fame Classic	Air Force	36	Vanderbilt	28	75,000	
December 22, 1983	Hall of Fame Classic	#18 West Virginia	20	Kentucky	16	42,000	
December 29, 1984	Hall of Fame Classic	Kentucky	20	#20 Wisconsin	19	47,300	
December 31, 1985	All-American Bowl	Georgia Tech	17	Michigan State	14	45,000	
December 31, 1986	All-American Bowl	Florida State	27	Indiana	13	30,000	
December 22, 1987	All-American Bowl	Virginia	22	Brigham Young	16	37,000	
December 29, 1988	All-American Bowl	Florida	14	Illinois	10	48,218	
December 28, 1989	All-American Bowl	#24 Texas Tech	49	#20 Duke	21	47,750	
December 28, 1990	All-American Bowl	North Carolina State	31	#23 Southern Miss	27	44,000	

== Most valuable players ==
Year played	MVP	Team	Position
1977	Chuck White	Maryland	SE
1977	Charles Johnson	Maryland	DT
1978	Curtis Dickey	Texas A&M	RB
1979	Phil Bradley	Missouri	QB
1980	Gary Anderson	Arkansas	RB
1980	Billy Ray Smith	Arkansas	LB
1981	John Bond	Mississippi State	QB
1981	Johnie Cooks	Mississippi State	LB
1982	Whit Taylor	Vanderbilt	QB
1982	Carl Dieudonne	Air Force	DE
1983	Jeff Hostetler	West Virginia	QB
1984	Mark Logan	Kentucky	RB
1984	Todd Gregoire	Wisconsin	PK
1985	Mark Ingram Sr.	Michigan State	WR
1986	Sammie Smith	Florida State	RB
1987	Scott Secules	Virginia	QB
1988	Emmitt Smith	Florida	RB
1989	James Gray	Texas Tech	RB
1990	Brett Favre	Southern Miss	QB

== Conference records ==
- Southwest Conference 3–0 (1.000)
- Atlantic Coast Conference 4–1 (.800)
- Southeastern Conference 3–2 (.600)
- Western Athletic Conference 1–1 (.500)
- Big Eight Conference 1–2 (.333)
- Big Ten Conference 0–4 (.000)

== Ranked teams ==
On several occasions, the All-American Bowl winners finished the season ranked in the AP Top Twenty poll:

- Texas A&M finished #19 in the final 1978 AP poll after defeating #19 Iowa State.
- West Virginia finished #16 in the final 1983 AP poll after defeating Kentucky.
- Kentucky finished #19 in the final 1984 AP poll and the final UPI poll after defeating #20 Wisconsin.
- Georgia Tech finished #19 in the final 1985 AP poll after defeating Michigan State.
- Texas Tech finished #19 in the final 1989 AP poll after defeating #20 Duke.

== See also ==
- List of college bowl games
