= 1988 Indianapolis Colts season =

36th season in franchise history

- Owner: Robert Irsay
- General manager: Jim Irsay
- Head coach: Ron Meyer
- Home stadium: Hoosier Dome

Results
- Record: 9–7
- Division place: 2nd AFC East
- Playoffs: Did not qualify
- All-Pros: RB Eric Dickerson (1st team); C Ray Donaldson (2nd team); T Chris Hinton (2nd team); K Dean Biasucci (2nd team)
- Pro Bowlers: C Ray Donaldson; T Chris Hinton; RB Eric Dickerson

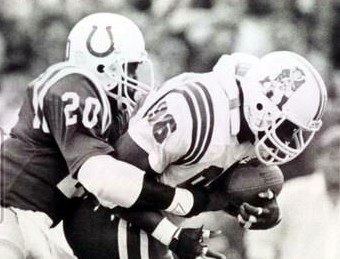
The Colts playing against the New England Patriots, circa 1988.

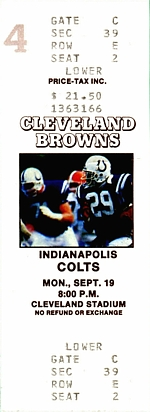
A ticket for a September 1988 game between the Colts and the Cleveland Browns.

The 1988 season was the 36th season for the Indianapolis Colts in the National Football League (NFL) and fifth in Indianapolis. The team finished the year with a record of 9 wins and 7 losses, and tied for second in the AFC East division with the New England Patriots. However, the Colts finished ahead of New England based on better record against common opponents (7–5 to Patriots' 6–6). At the start of the season, Ron Meyer demoted quarterback Gary Hogeboom to back up, and promoted Jack Trudeau to starter, which prompted Hogeboom to demand that he be either traded or released.

== Offseason ==
=== NFL draft ===
1988 Indianapolis Colts draft
Round	Pick	Player	Position	College	Notes
3	76	Chris Chandler *	Quarterback	Washington	
4	104	Michael Ball	Cornerback	Southern	
5	129	John Baylor	Cornerback	Southern Mississippi	
9	243	Jeff Herrod	Linebacker	Mississippi	
10	270	O'Brien Alston	Linebacker	Maryland	
11	297	Donnie Dee	Tight end	Tulsa	
12	308	Aatron Kenney	Wide receiver	Wisconsin–Stevens Point	
12	327	Tim Vesling	Placekicker	Syracuse	
Made roster * Made at least one Pro Bowl during career

=== Undrafted free agents ===
1988 undrafted free agents of note
Player	Position	College
Christopher Coyne	Center	Delaware
Stoney Polite	Running back	North Carolina A&T
Richie Sims	Defensive back	Louisiana Tech
Michael Summers	Running back	South Carolina State

== Personnel ==
=== Staff ===
1988 Indianapolis Colts staff
Front office: President and treasurer – Robert Irsay; Vice president and general manager – Jim Irsay; Assistant general manager – Bob Terpening; Director of player personnel – Jack Bushofsky; Head coaches: Head coach – Ron Meyer; Assistant head coach – Tom Lovat; Offensive coaches: Offensive coordinator – John Becker; Running backs – Leon Burtnett; Receivers – Chip Myers; Offensive line – Tom Lovat; Assistant offensive line – Keith Rowen	Defensive coaches: Defensive coordinator – George Hill; Defensive line – John Marshall; Linebackers – Rick Venturi; Secondary – George Catavolos; Special teams coaches: Special teams – Keith Rowen; Strength and conditioning: Strength and conditioning – Tom Zupancic

=== Roster ===
1988 Indianapolis Colts roster
Quarterbacks (QB): 17 Chris Chandler; 7 Gary Hogeboom; 12 Ricky Turner; Running backs (RB): 20 Albert Bentley KR; 29 Eric Dickerson; 34 George Wonsley; Wide receivers (WR): 86 Roy Banks; 87 Mark Bellini; 85 Matt Bouza; 80 Bill Brooks; 49 James Pruitt; 83 Clarence Verdin PR; Tight ends (TE): 81 Pat Beach; 84 Mark Boyer; 88 John Brandes LS; 48 Donnie Dee	Offensive linemen (OL): 62 Brian Baldinger T/G; 71 Kevin Call T; 69 Randy Dixon G; 53 Ray Donaldson C; 75 Chris Hinton T; 60 Dan McQuaid T; 65 Joel Patten T; 64 Ben Utt G; Defensive linemen (DL): 79 Harvey Armstrong NT; 72 Byron Darby NT; 75 Jon Hand DE; 90 Ezra Johnson DE; 73 Joe Klecko NT; 99 Donnell Thompson DE	Linebackers (LB): 97 O'Brien Alston OLB; 50 Duane Bickett OLB; 54 Jeff Herrod ILB; 55 Barry Krauss ILB; 56 Orlando Lowry OLB; 93 Cliff Odom ILB; 56 Fredd Young ILB; Defensive backs (DB): 31 Michael Ball CB/S; 38 Eugene Daniel CB; 21 John Holt SS; 28 Chuckie Miller CB; 39 Mike Prior FS; 26 Craig Swoope SS; 27 Keith Taylor CB/S; 42 Willie Tullis CB; Special teams (ST): 4 Dean Biasucci K; 3 Rohn Stark P	Reserve: 36 John Baylor CB (IR); -- Glen Collins DE (IR); 37 Chris Goode CB (IR); 92 Jeff Leiding LB (PUP); 47 Freddie Robinson S (IR); 10 Jack Trudeau QB (IR); Rookies in italics

== Regular season ==
=== Schedule ===
Week	Date	Opponent	Result	Record	Venue	Attendance
1	September 4	Houston Oilers	**L** 14–17 (OT)	0–1	Hoosier Dome	57,251
2	September 11	Chicago Bears	**L** 13–17	0–2	Hoosier Dome	60,503
3	September 19	at Cleveland Browns	**L** 17–23	0–3	Cleveland Stadium	75,148
4	September 25	**Miami Dolphins**	**W** 15–13	1–3	Hoosier Dome	59,638
5	October 2	at **New England Patriots**	**L** 17–21	1–4	Sullivan Stadium	58,050
6	October 9	at **Buffalo Bills**	**L** 23–34	1–5	Rich Stadium	76,018
7	October 16	Tampa Bay Buccaneers	**W** 35–31	2–5	Hoosier Dome	53,135
8	October 23	at San Diego Chargers	**W** 16–0	3–5	Jack Murphy Stadium	37,722
9	October 31	Denver Broncos	**W** 55–23	4–5	Hoosier Dome	60,544
10	November 6	**New York Jets**	**W** 38–14	5–5	Hoosier Dome	59,233
11	November 13	at Green Bay Packers	**W** 20–13	6–5	Lambeau Field	53,492
12	November 20	at Minnesota Vikings	**L** 3–12	6–6	Metrodome	58,342
13	November 27	**New England Patriots**	**W** 24–21	7–6	Hoosier Dome	58,157
14	December 4	at **Miami Dolphins**	**W** 31–28	8–6	Joe Robbie Stadium	45,236
15	December 10	at **New York Jets**	**L** 16–34	8–7	The Meadowlands	46,284
16	December 18	**Buffalo Bills**	**W** 17–14	9–7	Hoosier Dome	59,908
Note: Intra-division opponents are in **bold** text.

=== Game summaries ===
==== Week 4 ====
Team	1	2	3	4	Total
Dolphins	7	0	0	6	13
• Colts	3	9	0	3	15

- Date: September 25
- Location: Hoosier Dome, Indianapolis
- Game start: 1:00 p.m.
- Game weather: Indoors (dome)

Scoring summary
Q1	MIA	Hampton 39 yard pass from Marino (Reveiz kick)	MIA 7–0
Q1	IND	Biasucci 50 yard field goal	MIA 7–3
Q2	IND	Biasucci 34 yard field goal	MIA 7–6
Q2	IND	Biasucci 41 yard field goal	IND 9–7
Q2	IND	Biasucci 51 yard field goal	IND 12–7
Q4	IND	Biasucci 25 yard field goal	IND 15–7
Q4	MIA	Stradford 8 yard pass from Marino (two-point failed)	IND 15–13

==== Week 9 vs Broncos ====
Week Nine: Denver Broncos (4–4) at Indianapolis Colts (3–5)

Quarter	1	2	3	4	Total
Broncos	0	10	0	13	**23**
**Colts**	21	24	3	7	**55**

at Hoosier Dome, Indianapolis, Indiana

- Date: October 31
- Game time: 8:00 p.m. CDT
- Game weather: Indoors (dome)
- Game attendance: 60,544
- TV announcers (ABC): Al Michaels, Frank Gifford, Dan Dierdorf
- Box Score, Box Score

Game information

**First quarter**

- IND – Eric Dickerson 12-yard run (Dean Biasucci kick), 9:41. Colts 7–0.
- IND – Eric Dickerson 11-yard run (Dean Biasucci kick), 5:39. Colts 14–0.
- IND – Eric Dickerson 1-yard run (Dean Biasucci kick), 0:16. Colts 21–0.

**Second quarter**

- IND – Dean Biasucci 31-yard field goal, 13:22. Colts 24–0.
- IND – Eric Dickerson 41-yard run (Dean Biasucci kick), 11:47. Colts 31–0.
- DEN – Steve Sewell 2-yard pass from John Elway (Rich Karlis kick, 9:54. Colts 31–7.
- IND – Bill Brooks 53-yard pass from Gary Hogeboom (Dean Biasucci kick), 7:08. Colts 38–7.
- DEN – Rich Karlis 27-yard field goal, 1:00. Colts 38–10.
- IND – Clarence Verdin 40-yard pass from Chris Chandler (Dean Biasucci kick), 0:22. Colts 45–10.

**Third quarter**

- IND – Dean Biasucci 27-yard field goal, 6:34. Colts 48–10.

**Fourth quarter**

- IND – Albert Bentley 4-yard run (Dean Biasucci kick), 11:49. Colts 55–10.
- DEN – Vance Johnson 7-yard pass from Gary Kubiak (kick failed), 6:07. Colts 55–17.
- DEN – Steve Sewell 48-yard pass from Gary Kubiak (Rich Karlis kick), 5:39. Colts 55–23.

Top passers

- DEN – John Elway – 15/27, 158 yards, TD
- IND – Chris Chandler – 10/13, 167 yards, TD

Top rushers

- DEN – Ricky Nattiel – 1 rush, 29 yards
- IND – Eric Dickerson – 21 rushes, 159 yards, 4 TD

Top receivers

- DEN – Steve Sewell – 6 receptions, 82 yards, 2 TD
- IND – Bill Brooks – 3 receptions, 108 yards, TD

==== Week 10 vs Jets ====
External videos
- 1988 Jets at Colts - NFL Films highlights

=== Standings ===
AFC East
	W	L	T	PCT	DIV	CONF	PF	PA	STK
^{(2)} Buffalo Bills	12	4	0	.750	7–1	10–2	329	237	L1
Indianapolis Colts	9	7	0	.563	5–3	7–5	354	315	W1
New England Patriots	9	7	0	.563	5–3	7–5	250	284	L1
New York Jets	8	7	1	.531	3–5	6–7–1	372	354	W2
Miami Dolphins	6	10	0	.375	0–8	3–9	319	380	L1

== Awards and records ==
- Eric Dickerson, Led AFC (tied), Touchdowns, 15 TD's

== See also ==
- History of the Indianapolis Colts
- List of Indianapolis Colts seasons
- Colts–Patriots rivalry
