= Chris Pike (American football) =

American football player (born 1964)

No. 75, 93
- Position: Defensive tackle

Personal information
- Born: January 13, 1964 (age 62); Washington, D.C., U.S.
- Listed height: 6 ft 8 in (2.03 m)
- Listed weight: 280 lb (127 kg)

Career information
- High school: Calvin Coolidge (Washington, D.C.)
- College: North Carolina; Tulsa
- NFL draft: 1987: 6th round, 158th overall pick

Career history
- Cleveland Browns (1988–1990); San Diego Chargers (1991)*; Los Angeles Rams (1991)
- * Offseason or practice squad member only

Career NFL statistics
- Sacks: 1
- Fumble recoveries: 1
- Stats at Pro Football Reference

Christopher Holtz Pike (born January 13, 1964) is an American former professional football player who was a defensive tackle for three seasons in the National Football League (NFL). He played college football for the North Carolina Tar Heels and Tulsa Golden Hurricane. He was selected by the Philadelphia Eagles in the sixth round of the 1987 NFL draft. He was traded to the Cleveland Browns on March 25, 1988, in exchange for defensive back D. D. Hoggard and a 1988 sixth-round pick (which was later used to select defensive back Rob Sterling). He played for the Browns in 1989 and 1990, appearing in 24 games with 11 starts in 1990. Pike signed with the San Diego Chargers in 1991 as a Plan B free agent, but did not report to the team and was released on April 25, 1991. He signed with the Los Angeles Rams on September 12, 1991, and played in eight games with four starts for the team in 1991.
