= 1987 Arkansas Razorbacks football team =

American college football season

1987 Arkansas Razorbacks football

Liberty Bowl, L 17–20 vs. Georgia
- Conference: Southwest Conference
- Record: 9–4 (5–2 SWC)
- Head coach: Ken Hatfield (4th season)
- Offensive scheme: Option
- Defensive coordinator: Fred Goldsmith (4th season)
- Captains: Chris Bequette; Tony Cherico; Greg Thomas; Rickey Williams
- Home stadium: Razorback Stadium; War Memorial Stadium

1987 Southwest Conference football standings
	Conf.					Overall
Team	W		L		T	W		L		T
No. 10 Texas A&M $	6	–	1	–	0	10	–	2	–	0
Arkansas	5	–	2	–	0	9	–	4	–	0
Texas	5	–	2	–	0	7	–	5	–	0
Texas Tech	3	–	3	–	1	6	–	4	–	1
Baylor	3	–	4	–	0	6	–	5	–	0
TCU	3	–	4	–	0	5	–	6	–	0
Houston	2	–	4	–	1	4	–	6	–	1
Rice	0	–	8	–	0	2	–	9	–	0
$ – Conference champion; Rankings from AP Poll

The 1987 Arkansas Razorbacks football team represented the University of Arkansas as a member of the Southwest Conference (SWC) during the 1987 NCAA Division I-A football season. Led by fourth-year head coach Ken Hatfield, the Razorbacks compiled an overall record of 9–4 with a mark of 5–2 in conference play, tying for second place in the SWC. Arkansas was invited to the Liberty Bowl, where the Razorbacks lost to Georgia. The team played home games at Razorback Stadium in Fayetteville, Arkansas and War Memorial Stadium in Little Rock, Arkansas.

== Schedule ==
Date	Opponent	Rank	Site	TV	Result	Attendance	Source
September 12	Ole Miss*	No. 13	Mississippi Veterans Memorial Stadium; Jackson, MS (rivalry)		W 31–10	57,900	
September 19	Tulsa*	No. 12	Razorback Stadium; Fayetteville, AR		W 30–15	46,418	
September 26	No. 5 Miami (FL)*	No. 10	War Memorial Stadium; Little Rock, AR	ESPN	L 7–51	55,310	
October 3	at TCU		Amon G. Carter Stadium; Fort Worth, TX		W 20–10	39,017	
October 10	at Texas Tech	No. 20	Jones Stadium; Lubbock, TX (rivalry)		W 31–0	40,584	
October 17	Texas	No. 15	War Memorial Stadium; Little Rock, AR (rivalry)	ESPN	L 14–16	54,902	
October 24	Houston		Razorback Stadium; Fayetteville, AR		W 21–17	34,820	
October 31	at Rice		Rice Stadium; Houston, TX		W 38–14	13,200	
November 7	Baylor		Razorback Stadium; Fayetteville, AR		W 10–7	51,496	
November 14	at No. 19 Texas A&M	No. 20	Kyle Field; College Station, TX (rivalry)	ESPN	L 0–14	73,511	
November 28	New Mexico*		War Memorial Stadium; Little Rock, AR		W 43–25	27,200	
December 5	at Hawaii*		Aloha Stadium; Halawa, HI	ESPN	W 38–20	42,712	
December 29	vs. Georgia*		Liberty Bowl Memorial Stadium; Memphis, TN (Liberty Bowl)	Raycom	L 17–20	53,240	
*Non-conference game; Rankings from AP Poll released prior to the game

== Roster ==
- QB Greg Thomas, Sr
- QB Quinn Grovey, Fr
- QB Jim Simpson, Jr
- QB Michael James, Fr
- RB Sammy Van Dyke, Sr
- RB Barry Foster, Fr
- RB James Rouse, So
- RB Joe Johnson, Jr
- FB Anthony Chambers, Jr
- RB JuJu Harshaw, Fr
- RB Tony Holmes, So
- OT Freddie Childress, Jr
- OL Chris Bequette, Sr
- OL Bryan White, Sr
- OL James Morris, Jr
- OL Jim Mabry, So
- OL Rick Apolskis, So
- OL Darrin Worrell, So
- OL John Stitten, Fr
- OL Todd Gifford, Fr
- TE Jim Kessinger, Sr
- TE Billy Winston, So
- TE Elbert Crawford, So
- WR Derek Russell, Fr
- WR Tim Horton, So
- WR Skip Thompson, Jr

- DE Wayne Martin, Jr
- NG Tony Cherico, Sr
- DL Carl Bradford, Sr
- DL Shea Carr, Jr
- DL Michael Shepherd, So
- DL Albert Harris, So
- LB Rickey Williams, Sr
- LB Kerry Owens, Jr
- LB LaSalle Harper, Jr
- OLB Odis Lloyd, Jr
- LB Eric Whitted, Sr
- LB Reggie Hall, Jr
- LB Steve Jones, Sr
- LB Bubba Barrow, So
- FS Steve Atwater, Jr
- DB Richard Brothers, Jr
- DB Eric Bradford, Jr
- CB Anthony Cooney, So
- SS Patrick Williams, So
- DB John Bland, Jr
- DB Terrance Cain, Jr

- K Kendall Trainor, Jr
- P Allen Meacham, So
