= 1987 Houston Cougars football team =

American college football season

1987 Houston Cougars football
- Conference: Southwest Conference
- Record: 4–6–1 (2–4–1 SWC)
- Head coach: Jack Pardee (1st season)
- Offensive coordinator: John Jenkins (1st season)
- Offensive scheme: Run and shoot
- Defensive coordinator: Jim Eddy (1st season)
- Base defense: 4–3
- Captains: Gary McGuire; Robert Jones; Tim Britton
- Home stadium: Houston Astrodome

1987 Southwest Conference football standings
	Conf.					Overall
Team	W		L		T	W		L		T
No. 10 Texas A&M $	6	–	1	–	0	10	–	2	–	0
Arkansas	5	–	2	–	0	9	–	4	–	0
Texas	5	–	2	–	0	7	–	5	–	0
Texas Tech	3	–	3	–	1	6	–	4	–	1
Baylor	3	–	4	–	0	6	–	5	–	0
TCU	3	–	4	–	0	5	–	6	–	0
Houston	2	–	4	–	1	4	–	6	–	1
Rice	0	–	8	–	0	2	–	9	–	0
$ – Conference champion; Rankings from AP Poll

The 1987 Houston Cougars football team represented the University of Houston during the 1987 NCAA Division I-A football season. The Cougars were led by first-year head coach Jack Pardee and played their home games at the Astrodome in Houston, Texas. The team competed as members of the Southwest Conference, finishing in seventh.

== Schedule ==
Date	Opponent	Site	TV	Result	Attendance	Source
September 12	Oklahoma State*	Houston Astrodome; Houston, TX	Raycom	L 0–35	16,285	
September 26	Sam Houston State*	Houston Astrodome; Houston, TX		W 38–34	21,705	
October 3	Baylor	Houston Astrodome; Houston, TX (rivalry)		L 18–30	22,751	
October 10	at Texas A&M	Kyle Field; College Station, TX		L 17–22	64,415	
October 17	at Wyoming*	War Memorial Stadium; Laramie, WY		L 35–37	18,011	
October 24	at Arkansas	Razorback Stadium; Fayetteville, AR		L 17–21	34,820	
October 31	at TCU	Amon G. Carter Stadium; Fort Worth, TX		L 7–35	25,257	
November 7	Texas	Houston Astrodome; Houston, TX		W 60–40	36,274	
November 14	at Temple*	Veterans Stadium; Philadelphia, PA		W 37–7	12,780	
November 21	Texas Tech^{†}	Houston Astrodome; Houston, TX (rivalry)		T 10–10	19,295	
November 28	at Rice	Rice Stadium; Houston, TX (rivalry)	Raycom	W 45–21	10,300	
*Non-conference game; ^{†}Homecoming
