= 1987 Maryland Terrapins football team =

American college football season

1987 Maryland Terrapins football
- Conference: Atlantic Coast Conference
- Record: 4–7 (3–3 ACC)
- Head coach: Joe Krivak (1st season)
- Offensive coordinator: James C. Cavanaugh (1st season)
- Defensive coordinator: Greg Williams (1st season)
- Home stadium: Byrd Stadium

1987 Atlantic Coast Conference football standings
	Conf.					Overall
Team	W		L		T	W		L		T
No. 12 Clemson $	6	–	1	–	0	10	–	2	–	0
Virginia	5	–	2	–	0	8	–	4	–	0
Wake Forest	4	–	3	–	0	7	–	4	–	0
NC State	4	–	3	–	0	4	–	7	–	0
Maryland	3	–	3	–	0	4	–	7	–	0
North Carolina	3	–	4	–	0	5	–	6	–	0
Duke	2	–	5	–	0	5	–	6	–	0
Georgia Tech	0	–	6	–	0	2	–	9	–	0
$ – Conference champion; Rankings from AP Poll

The 1987 Maryland Terrapins football team represented the University of Maryland in the 1987 NCAA Division I-A football season. In their first season under head coach Joe Krivak, the Terrapins compiled a 4–7 record, finished in fifth place in the Atlantic Coast Conference, and were outscored by their opponents 301 to 194. The team's statistical leaders included Dan Henning with 1,835 passing yards, Bren Lowery with 556 rushing yards, and Azizuddin Abdur-Ra'oof with 617 receiving yards.

== Schedule ==
Date	Opponent	Site	Result	Attendance	Source
September 5	at Syracuse*	Carrier Dome; Syracuse, NY	L 11–25	35,234	
September 12	Virginia	Byrd Stadium; College Park, MD (rivalry)	W 21–19	35,550	
September 19	West Virginia*	Byrd Stadium; College Park, MD (rivalry)	W 25–20	40,125	
September 26	at NC State	Carter–Finley Stadium; Raleigh, NC	L 14–42	44,300	
October 10	at No. 3 Miami (FL)*	Miami Orange Bowl; Miami, FL	L 16–46	43,020	
October 17	at Wake Forest	Groves Stadium; Winston-Salem, NC	W 14–0	25,175	
October 24	Duke	Byrd Stadium; College Park, MD	W 23–22	37,400	
October 31	North Carolina	Byrd Stadium; College Park, MD	L 14–27	35,425	
November 7	No. 16 Penn State*	Memorial Stadium; Baltimore, MD (rivalry)	L 16–21	62,500	
November 14	at No. 9 Clemson	Memorial Stadium; Clemson, SC	L 16–45	76,773	
November 21	at Vanderbilt*	Vanderbilt Stadium; Nashville, TN	L 24–34	34,816	
*Non-conference game; Rankings from AP Poll released prior to the game

== Roster ==
1987 Maryland Terrapins football team roster
Players
Coaches
Offense

Pos.	#	Name	Class
TE	93	Ferrell Edmunds	Sr
QB	12	Dan Henning	Sr
OT	74	Clarence Jones	So
QB	14	Neil O'Donnell	So
QB	13	Scott Zolak	Fr

Defense

Pos.	#	Name	Class
LB	60	O'Brien Alston	Sr
DB	4	J. B. Brown	Jr
DT	90	Warren Powers	Jr
LB	44	Kevin Walker	Sr

Special teams

Pos.	#	Name	Class

Head coach

- Joe Krivak

Coordinators/assistant coaches

Legend

- (C) Team captain
- (S) Suspended
- (I) Ineligible
- Injured
- Redshirt
