= 1987 Texas Longhorns football team =

American college football season

1987 Texas Longhorns football

Astro–Bluebonnet Bowl champion

Astro-Bluebonnet Bowl, W 32–27 vs. Pittsburgh
- Conference: Southwest Conference

Ranking
- Coaches: No. 19
- Record: 7–5 (5–2 SWC)
- Head coach: David McWilliams (1st season)
- Offensive coordinator: John Mize (1st season)
- Defensive coordinator: Paul Jette (1st season)
- Home stadium: Texas Memorial Stadium

1987 Southwest Conference football standings
	Conf.					Overall
Team	W		L		T	W		L		T
No. 10 Texas A&M $	6	–	1	–	0	10	–	2	–	0
Arkansas	5	–	2	–	0	9	–	4	–	0
Texas	5	–	2	–	0	7	–	5	–	0
Texas Tech	3	–	3	–	1	6	–	4	–	1
Baylor	3	–	4	–	0	6	–	5	–	0
TCU	3	–	4	–	0	5	–	6	–	0
Houston	2	–	4	–	1	4	–	6	–	1
Rice	0	–	8	–	0	2	–	9	–	0
$ – Conference champion; Rankings from AP Poll

The 1987 Texas Longhorns football team represented the University of Texas at Austin in the 1987 NCAA Division I-A football season. The Longhorns finished the regular season with a 6–5 record and defeated Pittsburgh in the Astro-Bluebonnet Bowl.

== Schedule ==
Date	Time	Opponent	Site	TV	Result	Attendance	Source
September 5	3:30 p.m.	at No. 5 Auburn*	Jordan-Hare Stadium; Auburn, AL	ESPN	L 3–31	80,000	
September 12	7:00 p.m.	BYU*	Texas Memorial Stadium; Austin, TX	HSE	L 17–22	65,102	
September 26	7:00 p.m.	Oregon State*	Texas Memorial Stadium; Austin, TX	HSE	W 61–16	53,389	
October 3	7:00 p.m.	Rice	Texas Memorial Stadium; Austin, TX (rivalry)	HSE	W 45–26	54,740	
October 10	1:30 p.m.	vs. No. 1 Oklahoma*	Cotton Bowl; Dallas, TX (Red River Shootout)	CBS	L 9–44	75,587	
October 17	3:00 p.m.	at No. 15 Arkansas	War Memorial Stadium; Little Rock, AR (rivalry)	ESPN	W 16–14	54,902	
October 31	1:00 p.m.	Texas Tech	Texas Memorial Stadium; Austin, TX (rivalry)	HSE	W 41–27	74,984	
November 7	7:00 p.m.	at Houston	Houston Astrodome; Houston, TX	HSE	L 40–60	36,274	
November 14	12:00 p.m.	TCU	Texas Memorial Stadium; Austin, TX (rivalry)	Raycom	W 24–21	63,642	
November 21	1:00 p.m.	Baylor	Texas Memorial Stadium; Austin, TX (rivalry)	HSE	W 34–16	61,331	
November 26	7:00 p.m.	at No. 15 Texas A&M	Kyle Field; College Station, TX (rivalry)	ESPN	L 13–20	78,573	
December 31	7:00 p.m.	vs. Pittsburgh*	Houston Astrodome; Houston, TX (Astro-Bluebonnet Bowl)	Mizlou	W 32–27	33,122	
*Non-conference game; Rankings from AP Poll released prior to the game; All times are in Central time

== Game summaries ==
=== BYU ===
BYU Cougars (0–1) at Texas Longhorns (0–1)

Quarter	1	2	3	4	Total
BYU	0	14	8	0	22
Texas	7	3	0	7	17

at Texas Memorial Stadium, Austin, Texas

- Date: September 12, 1987
- Game time: 7:00 p.m.
- Game weather: Clear, 87 °F (31 °C)
- Game attendance: 65,102
- Box Score, Box Score

Game information

First quarter

- UT – Bret Stafford 1-yard run (Wayne Clements kick), 8:43. Texas 7–0.

Second quarter

- BYU – David Miles 21-yard pass from Bob Jensen (Leonard Chitty kick), 14:54. Tie 7–7.
- BYU – Chuck Cutler 27-yard pass from Bob Jensen (Leonard Chitty kick), 1:38. BYU 14–7.
- UT – Wayne Clements 46-yard field goal, 0:00. BYU 14–10.

Third quarter

- BYU – Safety, Richard Hobbs blocked punt through end zone, 13:13. BYU 16–10.
- BYU – Leonard Chitty 33-yard field goal, 4:26. BYU 19–10.
- BYU – Leonard Chitty 33-yard field goal, 2:25. BYU 22–10.

Fourth quarter

- UT – Darron Norris 3-yard run (Wayne Clements kick), 1:06. BYU 22–17.

Top passers

- BYU – Bob Jensen – 16/35, 199 yards, 2 TD, INT
- UT – Bret Stafford – 12/26, 107 yards, 3 INT

Top rushers

- BYU – Peter Tuipulotu – 6 rushes, 16 yards
- UT – Darron Norris – 8 rushes, 85 yards, TD

Top receivers

- BYU – Chuck Cutler – 5 receptions, 70 yards, TD
- UT – Tony Jones – 5 receptions, 61 yards

External videos
- Game highlights

=== vs Oklahoma ===
Oklahoma Sooners (4–0) vs. Texas Longhorns (2–2)

Quarter	1	2	3	4	Total
Oklahoma	0	13	21	10	44
Texas	3	3	0	3	9

at Cotton Bowl • Dallas, Texas

- Date: October 10
- Game time: 1:30 p.m.
- Game weather: Clear • 83 °F (28 °C) • Wind 6 WNW
- Game attendance: 75,587
- TV: CBS
- Texas Sports

Game information

Oklahoma

- Charles Thompson
  8 Rush, 114 Yds, TD

Texas

- Bret Stafford
  17/32, 116 Yds, 5 INT
- Eric Metcalf
  14 Rush, 63 Yds
- Tony Jones
  3 Rec, 40 Yds

Scoring summary

Quarter	Time	Drive			Team	Scoring information	Score	
Quarter	Time	Plays	Yards	TOP	Team	Scoring information	OU	TEX
1	1:05	4	9	1:33	Texas	52-yard field goal by Clements	0	3
2	14:03	8	78	2:02	Oklahoma	Carr 7-yard touchdown run, Lashar kick good	7	3
2	8:44	10	68	4:21	Oklahoma	46-yard field goal by Lashar	10	3
2	2:28	10	28	3:58	Oklahoma	22-yard field goal by Lashar	13	3
2	0:17	9	42	2:11	Texas	46-yard field goal by Clements	13	6
3	9:29	3	40	1:24	Oklahoma	Cabbiness 44-yard touchdown reception from Holieway, Lashar kick good	20	6
3	8:13	2	38	0:37	Oklahoma	Carr 32-yard touchdown run, Lashar kick good	27	6
3	2:23	5	35	2:16	Oklahoma	Collins 4-yard touchdown run, Lashar kick good	34	6
4	14:09	9	50	3:14	Texas	36-yard field goal by Clements	34	9
4	9:04	9	52	5:05	Oklahoma	29-yard field goal by Lashar	37	9
4	7:10	2	81	0:40	Oklahoma	Thompson 55-yard touchdown run, Lashar kick good	44	9
"TOP" = time of possession. For other American football terms, see Glossary of American football.							44	9

== Roster ==
1987 Texas Longhorns football team roster
Players
Coaches
Offense

Pos.	#	Name	Class
WR	11	Keith Cash	Fr
TE	19	Kerry Cash	Fr
C	54	Alan Champagne	Jr
OT	72	Ed Cunningham	Jr
G	61	Paul Jetton	Sr
WR	4	Tony Jones	So
QB	7	Shannon Kelley	Jr
RB	2	Eric Metcalf	Jr
G	76	Brian Nielsen	So
FB	36	Peter Pope	Sr
G	65	Omar Saleh	Jr
OT	78	Charles Seafous	Fr
QB	10	Bret Stafford	Sr
OT	51	Stan Thomas	Fr
WR	1	Johnny Walker	Fr

Defense

Pos.	#	Name	Class
DE	97	Thomas Aldridge	Sr
DT	89	Rocky Allen	So
LB	63	Lee Brockman	Jr
DE	46	Bobby Duncam	Jr
DT	93	Steve Llewellyn	Jr
CB	16	Anthony Griffin	Sr
LB	60	Britt Hager	Jr
DB	17	John Hagy	Sr
DB	18	Stanley Richard	Fr

Special teams

Pos.	#	Name	Class
K		Wayne Clements

Head coach

- David McWilliams

Coordinators/assistant coaches

Legend

- (C) Team captain
- (S) Suspended
- (I) Ineligible
- Injured
- Redshirt

== NFL draft ==
The following players were selected in the 1988 NFL draft football following the season.

Player	Position	Round	Pick	Franchise
Paul Jetton	Guard	6	141	Cincinnati Bengals
John Hagy	Defensive Back	8	204	Buffalo Bills

- Running back Eric Metcalf was drafted by the Cleveland Browns in 1989.
