= 1987 Rice Owls football team =

American college football season

1987 Rice Owls football
- Conference: Southwest Conference
- Record: 2–9 (0–7 SWC)
- Head coach: Jerry Berndt (2nd season)
- Defensive coordinator: Ron Chismar (1st season)
- Home stadium: Rice Stadium

1987 Southwest Conference football standings
	Conf.					Overall
Team	W		L		T	W		L		T
No. 10 Texas A&M $	6	–	1	–	0	10	–	2	–	0
Arkansas	5	–	2	–	0	9	–	4	–	0
Texas	5	–	2	–	0	7	–	5	–	0
Texas Tech	3	–	3	–	1	6	–	4	–	1
Baylor	3	–	4	–	0	6	–	5	–	0
TCU	3	–	4	–	0	5	–	6	–	0
Houston	2	–	4	–	1	4	–	6	–	1
Rice	0	–	8	–	0	2	–	9	–	0
$ – Conference champion; Rankings from AP Poll

The 1987 Rice Owls football team was an American football team that represented Rice University in the Southwest Conference during the 1987 NCAA Division I-A football season. In their second year under head coach Jerry Berndt, the team compiled a 2–9 record.

== Schedule ==
Date	Opponent	Site	TV	Result	Attendance	Source
September 5	Lamar*	Rice Stadium; Houston, TX		W 34–30	12,500	
September 12	at Indiana*	Memorial Stadium; Bloomington, IN		L 13–35	38,132	
September 19	at No. 4 LSU*	Tiger Stadium; Baton Rouge, LA	PPV	L 16–49	73,558	
September 26	Southwest Texas State*	Rice Stadium; Houston, TX		W 38–26		
October 3	at Texas	Texas Memorial Stadium; Austin, TX (rivalry)		L 26–45	54,740	
October 10	TCU	Rice Stadium; Houston, TX		L 16–30	11,700	
October 17	at Texas Tech	Jones Stadium; Lubbock, TX		L 7–59	25,314	
October 24	Texas A&M	Rice Stadium; Houston, TX		L 21–34	32,500	
October 31	Arkansas	Rice Stadium; Houston, TX		L 14–38	13,200	
November 14	at Baylor	Baylor Stadium; Waco, TX		L 31–34	20,075	
November 28	Houston	Rice Stadium; Houston, TX (rivalry)		L 21–45	10,300	
*Non-conference game; Rankings from AP Poll released prior to the game
