= 1987 All-American Bowl =

BYU Cougars	Virginia Cavaliers
(9–3)	(7–4)
16	22
Head coach: Lavell Edwards	Head coach: George Welsh
	1	2	3	4	Total
BYU	3	0	6	7	16
Virginia	7	7	0	8	22
- Date: December 22, 1987
- Season: 1987
- Stadium: Legion Field
- Location: Birmingham, Alabama
- MVP: QB Scott Secules (Virginia)
- Attendance: 37,000

United States TV coverage
- Network: Raycom
- Announcers: Ron Franklin and Dave Rowe

The 1987 All-American Bowl featured the first meeting between the BYU Cougars and the Virginia Cavaliers. BYU, coached by Lavell Edwards, had a 9–3 record going into the bowl game and Virginia, coached by George Welsh, had a 7–4 record.

== Game summary ==
The game ended up being filled with missed opportunities for BYU. The Cougars missed a pair of field goals – one from 51 yards and another from 47 yards. Virginia's defense also came through a couple of different times with key goal line stands to stop other potential scoring drives.

BYU settled for a 20-yard field goal from Leonard Chitty on its first possession to take a 3–0 lead. The Cougars had a first-and-goal from the 4-yard line but Darren Handley dropped a would-be touchdown pass on third down. Trailing 3–0, the Cavaliers struck quickly. Quarterback Scott Secules scored on a three-yard keeper to make it 7–3. Early in the second quarter, Virginia went 66 yards in four plays behind the running of Kevin Morgan, who scored on a 25-yard run to make it 14–3.

The third quarter belonged to BYU, who held the ball for all but two minutes. But the Cougars scored just once – on an eight-yard run by Freddie Whittingham. A muffed PAT attempt left it 14–9. Another potential scoring drive ended when BYU drove inside the five-yard line, but a fourth down pass to Matt Bellini was batted away in the end zone by Tony Covington.

Virginia boosted its lead to 22–9 with 11:17 left in the game when John Ford hauled in a 22-yard pass from Secules and the Cavs had a successful two-point conversion. The Cougars answered with a one-yard touchdown pass from Sean Covey to Whittingham that made it 22–16 with 7:09 remaining. BYU had one last shot at a go-ahead touchdown in the final minutes, but Covey was stopped two feet short on a fourth-down run by defensive end Sean Scott.

Secules was named MVP after completing 10 of 19 passes for 162 yards, one touchdown and two interceptions. Covey threw 61 passes and completed 37 for 394 yards, one touchdown and one interception.
