= John Baylor (American football) =

American football player (born 1965)

No. 36
- Position: Cornerback

Personal information
- Born: March 5, 1965 (age 61); Meridian, Mississippi, U.S.
- Listed height: 6 ft 0 in (1.83 m)
- Listed weight: 203 lb (92 kg)

Career information
- High school: Meridian (MS)
- College: Southern Miss
- NFL draft: 1988: 5th round, 129th overall pick

Career history
- Indianapolis Colts (1988–1993)

Career NFL statistics
- Interceptions: 8
- Sacks: 4
- Fumble recoveries: 3
- Stats at Pro Football Reference

John Martin Baylor (born March 5, 1965) is an American former professional football player who played cornerback for five seasons for the Indianapolis Colts, who selected him in the fifth round of the 1988 NFL draft with the 129th overall pick.
