= 1987 Wake Forest Demon Deacons football team =

American college football season

1987 Wake Forest Demon Deacons football
- Conference: Atlantic Coast Conference
- Record: 7–4 (4–3 ACC)
- Head coach: Bill Dooley (1st season)
- Defensive coordinator: Bob Pruett (3rd season)
- Captains: Chip Rives; Jimmie Simmons
- Home stadium: Groves Stadium

1987 Atlantic Coast Conference football standings
	Conf.					Overall
Team	W		L		T	W		L		T
No. 12 Clemson $	6	–	1	–	0	10	–	2	–	0
Virginia	5	–	2	–	0	8	–	4	–	0
Wake Forest	4	–	3	–	0	7	–	4	–	0
NC State	4	–	3	–	0	4	–	7	–	0
Maryland	3	–	3	–	0	4	–	7	–	0
North Carolina	3	–	4	–	0	5	–	6	–	0
Duke	2	–	5	–	0	5	–	6	–	0
Georgia Tech	0	–	6	–	0	2	–	9	–	0
$ – Conference champion; Rankings from AP Poll

The 1987 Wake Forest Demon Deacons football team was an American football team that represented Wake Forest University during the 1987 NCAA Division I-A football season. In its first season under head coach Bill Dooley, the team compiled a 7–4 record and finished in a tie for third place in the Atlantic Coast Conference.

== Schedule ==
Date	Opponent	Site	Result	Attendance	Source
September 12	Richmond*	Groves Stadium; Winston-Salem, NC	W 24–0	14,250	
September 19	NC State	Groves Stadium; Winston-Salem, NC (rivalry)	W 21–3	23,600	
September 26	Appalachian State*	Groves Stadium; Winston-Salem, NC	W 16–12	33,400	
October 3	at Army*	Michie Stadium; West Point, NY	W 17–13	36,690	
October 10	at North Carolina	Kenan Memorial Stadium; Chapel Hill, NC (rivalry)	W 22–14	50,000	
October 17	Maryland	Groves Stadium; Winston-Salem, NC	L 0–14	25,175	
October 24	at Virginia	Scott Stadium; Charlottesville, VA	L 21–35	32,500	
October 31	at No. 14 Clemson	Memorial Stadium; Clemson, SC	L 17–31	69,711	
November 7	Duke	Groves Stadium; Winston-Salem, NC (rivalry)	W 30–27	23,500	
November 14	No. 14 South Carolina*	Groves Stadium; Winston-Salem, NC	L 0–30	34,720	
November 21	at Georgia Tech	Grant Field; Atlanta, GA	W 33–6	21,114	
*Non-conference game; Rankings from AP Poll released prior to the game

== Roster ==
1987 Wake Forest Demon Deacons football team roster
Players
Coaches
Offense

Pos.	#	Name	Class
QB	10	Mike Elkins	Jr
WR	88	Ricky Proehl	So

Defense

Pos.	#	Name	Class
LB		David Braxton	Jr

Special teams

Pos.	#	Name	Class

Head coach

- Bill Dooley

Coordinators/assistant coaches

Legend

- (C) Team captain
- (S) Suspended
- (I) Ineligible
- Injured
- Redshirt

== Team leaders ==
Category	Team Leader	Att/Cth	Yds
Passing	Mike Elkins	169/317	1,915
Rushing	Mark Young	179	795
Receiving	Ricky Proehl	54	788
