= 1987 Georgia Tech Yellow Jackets football team =

American college football season

1987 Georgia Tech Yellow Jackets football
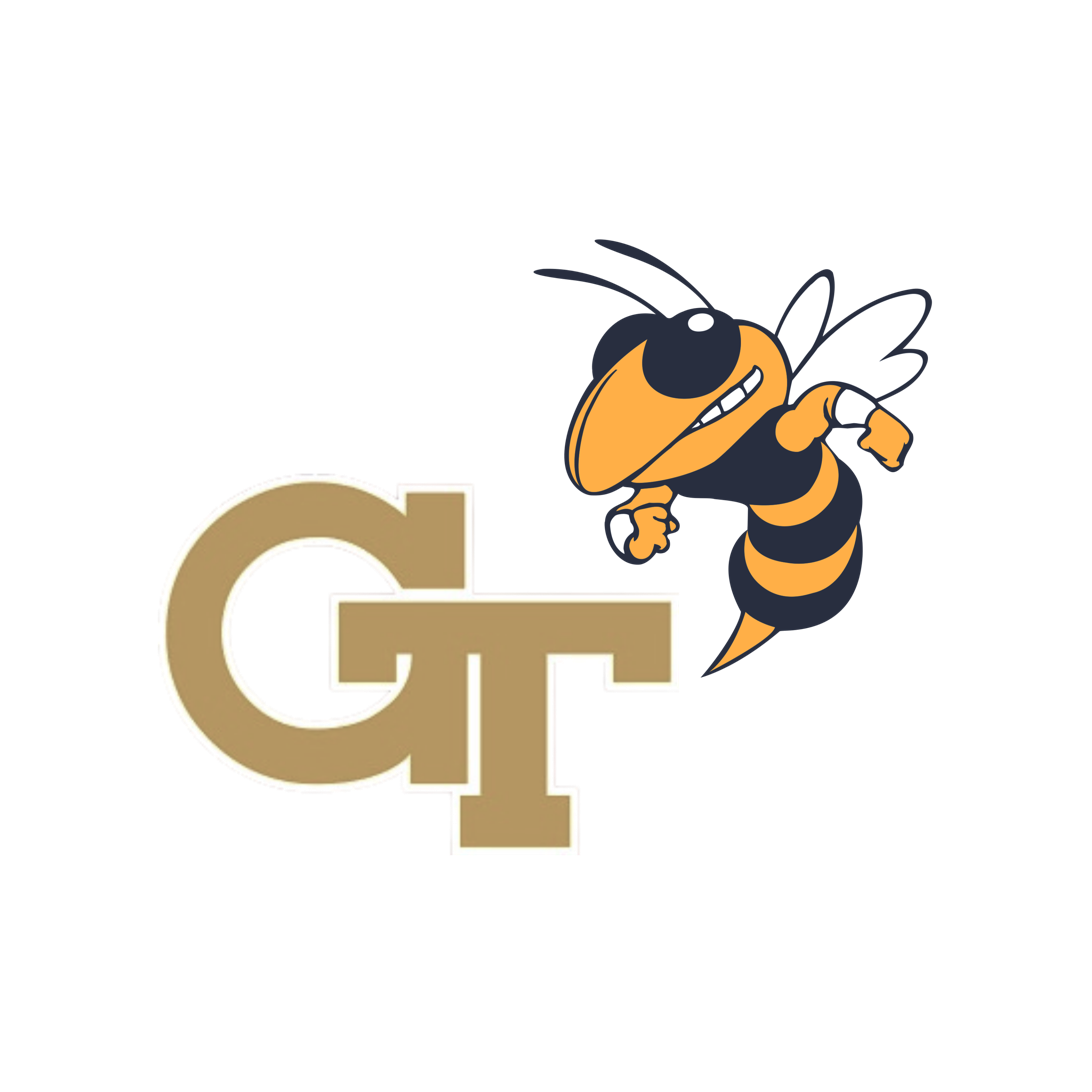
- Conference: Atlantic Coast Conference
- Record: 2–9 (0–6 ACC)
- Head coach: Bobby Ross (1st season)
- Offensive coordinator: Ralph Friedgen (1st season)
- Defensive coordinator: George O'Leary (1st season)
- Captains: Ivery Lee; Malcolm King
- Home stadium: Grant Field

1987 Atlantic Coast Conference football standings
	Conf.					Overall
Team	W		L		T	W		L		T
No. 12 Clemson $	6	–	1	–	0	10	–	2	–	0
Virginia	5	–	2	–	0	8	–	4	–	0
Wake Forest	4	–	3	–	0	7	–	4	–	0
NC State	4	–	3	–	0	4	–	7	–	0
Maryland	3	–	3	–	0	4	–	7	–	0
North Carolina	3	–	4	–	0	5	–	6	–	0
Duke	2	–	5	–	0	5	–	6	–	0
Georgia Tech	0	–	6	–	0	2	–	9	–	0
$ – Conference champion; Rankings from AP Poll

The 1987 Georgia Tech Yellow Jackets football team represented the Georgia Institute of Technology during the 1987 NCAA Division I-A football season. The Yellow Jackets were led by first-year head coach Bobby Ross, and played their home games at Grant Field in Atlanta, the last season under that name before the stadium was renamed in honor of legendary Georgia Tech head coach Bobby Dodd. The team competed as members of the Atlantic Coast Conference, finishing in last and failing to a win a conference game.

== Schedule ==
Date	Opponent	Site	TV	Result	Attendance	Source
September 12	The Citadel*	Grant Field; Atlanta, GA		W 51–12	31,211	
September 19	North Carolina	Grant Field; Atlanta, GA		L 23–30	33,151	
September 26	at No. 9 Clemson	Memorial Stadium; Clemson, SC (rivalry)	Raycom	L 12–33	78,832	
October 3	at NC State	Carter–Finley Stadium; Raleigh, NC	Raycom	L 0–17	36,300	
October 10	Indiana State*	Grant Field; Atlanta, GA		W 38–0	30,039	
October 17	No. 5 Auburn*	Grant Field; Atlanta, GA (rivalry)		L 10–20	45,559	
October 24	at No. 13 Tennessee*	Neyland Stadium; Knoxville, TN (rivalry)		L 15–29	93,011	
October 31	at Duke	Wallace Wade Stadium; Durham, NC		L 14–48	30,800	
November 7	Virginia^{†}	Grant Field; Atlanta, GA	Raycom	L 14–23	38,111	
November 21	Wake Forest	Grant Field; Atlanta, GA		L 6–33	21,114	
November 28	No. 14 Georgia*	Grant Field; Atlanta, GA (Clean, Old-Fashioned Hate)	ESPN	L 16–30	45,103	
*Non-conference game; ^{†}Homecoming; Rankings from AP Poll released prior to the game

== Roster ==
1987 Georgia Tech Yellow Jackets football team roster
Players			Coaches
Offense: Pos. / # / Name / Class	Defense: Pos. / # / Name / Class; DB / / Mike MacIntyre	Special teams: Pos. / # / Name / Class	Head coach: Bobby Ross; Coordinators/assistant coaches: Ralph Friedgen – Offensive coordinator/quarterbacks; Danny Smith – Running backs; Jimmy Robinson – Wide receivers; Mark Hendrickson – Tight ends/special teams; Pat Watson – Offensive line; George O'Leary – Defensive coordinator/defensive line; Brian Baker – Outside linebacker; Charlie Rizzo – Inside linebackers; Chuck Priefer – Defensive backs; Legend: (C) Team captain; (S) Suspended; (I) Ineligible; Injured; Redshirt
