= 1987 Baylor Bears football team =

American college football season

1987 Baylor Bears football
- Conference: Southwest Conference
- Record: 6–5 (3–4 SWC)
- Head coach: Grant Teaff (16th season)
- Offensive coordinator: Duke Christian (9th season)
- Offensive scheme: I formation
- Defensive coordinator: Pete Fredenburg (5th season)
- Base defense: 4–4
- Home stadium: Baylor Stadium

1987 Southwest Conference football standings
	Conf.					Overall
Team	W		L		T	W		L		T
No. 10 Texas A&M $	6	–	1	–	0	10	–	2	–	0
Arkansas	5	–	2	–	0	9	–	4	–	0
Texas	5	–	2	–	0	7	–	5	–	0
Texas Tech	3	–	3	–	1	6	–	4	–	1
Baylor	3	–	4	–	0	6	–	5	–	0
TCU	3	–	4	–	0	5	–	6	–	0
Houston	2	–	4	–	1	4	–	6	–	1
Rice	0	–	8	–	0	2	–	9	–	0
$ – Conference champion; Rankings from AP Poll

The 1987 Baylor Bears football team represented Baylor University as a member of the Southwest Conference (SWC) during the 1987 NCAA Division I-A football season. Led by 16th-year head coach Grant Teaff, the Bears compiled an overall record of 6–5 with a mark of 3–4 in conference play, tying for fifth place in the SWC. The team played home games at Baylor Stadium in Waco, Texas.

== Schedule ==
Date	Opponent	Site	TV	Result	Attendance	Source
September 5	Louisiana Tech*	Baylor Stadium; Waco, TX		W 13–3	22,535	
September 12	at Missouri*	Faurot Field; Columbia, MO		L 18–23	37,172	
September 19	at UNLV*	Sam Boyd Silver Bowl; Paradise, NV		W 21–14	27,128	
September 26	Texas Tech	Baylor Stadium; Waco, TX (rivalry)	Raycom	W 36–22	34,816	
October 3	at Houston	Houston Astrodome; Houston, TX (rivalry)		W 30–18	22,751	
October 10	Southwest Texas State*	Baylor Stadium; Waco, Texas		W 36–15	21,739	
October 17	Texas A&M	Baylor Stadium; Waco, TX (rivalry)	Raycom	L 10–34	46,812	
October 24	TCU^{†}	Baylor Stadium; Waco, TX (rivalry)	Raycom	L 0–24	36,138	
November 7	at Arkansas	Razorback Stadium; Fayetteville, AR		L 7–10	51,496	
November 14	Rice	Baylor Stadium; Waco, TX		W 34–31	20,075	
November 21	at Texas	Texas Memorial Stadium; Austin, TX (rivalry)	HSE	L 16–34	61,331	
*Non-conference game; ^{†}Homecoming

== After the season ==
The following player was drafted into professional football following the season.

Player	Position	Round	Pick	Franchise
Joel Porter	Guard	10	273	Chicago Bears
