= 1987 Virginia Cavaliers football team =

American college football season

1987 Virginia Cavaliers football

All-American Bowl champion

All-American Bowl, W 22–16 vs. BYU
- Conference: Atlantic Coast Conference
- Record: 8–4 (5–2 ACC)
- Head coach: George Welsh (6th season)
- Offensive coordinator: Gary Tranquill (1st season)
- Defensive coordinator: Frank Spaziani (1st season)
- Captains: Sean Scott; Scott Secules
- Home stadium: Scott Stadium

1987 Atlantic Coast Conference football standings
	Conf.					Overall
Team	W		L		T	W		L		T
No. 12 Clemson $	6	–	1	–	0	10	–	2	–	0
Virginia	5	–	2	–	0	8	–	4	–	0
Wake Forest	4	–	3	–	0	7	–	4	–	0
NC State	4	–	3	–	0	4	–	7	–	0
Maryland	3	–	3	–	0	4	–	7	–	0
North Carolina	3	–	4	–	0	5	–	6	–	0
Duke	2	–	5	–	0	5	–	6	–	0
Georgia Tech	0	–	6	–	0	2	–	9	–	0
$ – Conference champion; Rankings from AP Poll

The 1987 Virginia Cavaliers football team represented the University of Virginia during the 1987 NCAA Division I-A football season. The Cavaliers were led by sixth-year head coach George Welsh and played their home games at Scott Stadium in Charlottesville, Virginia. They competed as members of the Atlantic Coast Conference, finishing in second. Virginia was invited to the 1987 All-American Bowl in Birmingham, Alabama, where they defeated BYU.

== Schedule ==
Date	Time	Opponent	Site	TV	Result	Attendance	Source
September 5	1:00 p.m.	at No. 20 Georgia*	Sanford Stadium; Athens, GA		L 22–30	75,126	
September 12	12:05 p.m.	at Maryland	Byrd Stadium; College Park, MD (rivalry)	JPS	L 19–21	35,550	
September 19	1:00 p.m.	Virginia Tech*	Scott Stadium; Charlottesville, VA (rivalry)		W 14–13	44,300	
September 26	7:00 p.m.	Duke^{†}	Scott Stadium; Charlottesville, VA		W 42–17	35,500	
October 3	7:00 p.m.	VMI*	Scott Stadium; Charlottesville, VA		W 30–0	23,500	
October 10	12:00 p.m.	at No. 8 Clemson	Memorial Stadium; Clemson, SC	JPS	L 21–38	79,963	
October 17	1:30 p.m.	at South Carolina*	Williams–Brice Stadium; Columbia, SC		L 10–58	67,638	
October 24	7:00 p.m.	Wake Forest	Scott Stadium; Charlottesville, VA		W 35–21	32,500	
November 7	12:05 p.m.	at Georgia Tech	Grant Field; Atlanta, GA	JPS	W 23–14	38,111	
November 14	1:00 p.m.	North Carolina	Scott Stadium; Charlottesville, VA (South's Oldest Rivalry)		W 20–17	38,400	
November 21	12:00 p.m.	at NC State	Carter–Finley Stadium; Raleigh, NC		W 34–31	35,200	
December 22	8:00 p.m.	vs. BYU*	Legion Field; Birmingham, AL (All-American Bowl)	Raycom	W 22–16	37,000	
*Non-conference game; ^{†}Homecoming; Rankings from AP Poll released prior to the game

== Roster ==
1987 Virginia Cavaliers football team roster
Players
Coaches
Offense

Pos.	#	Name	Class
WR	17	John Ford	Jr
QB	12	Shawn Moore	Fr
QB	10	Scott Secules (C)	Sr

Defense

Pos.	#	Name	Class
LB	98	David Griggs	Sr
LB	66	Jeff Lageman	Jr

Special teams

Pos.	#	Name	Class

Head coach

- George Welsh

Coordinators/assistant coaches

Legend

- (C) Team captain
- (S) Suspended
- (I) Ineligible
- Injured
- Redshirt
