= O'Brien Alston =

American football player (born 1965)

No. 97
- Position: Linebacker

Personal information
- Born: December 21, 1965 (age 60); New Haven, Connecticut, U.S.
- Listed height: 6 ft 6 in (1.98 m)
- Listed weight: 245 lb (111 kg)

Career information
- High school: Oxon Hill (MD)
- College: Maryland
- NFL draft: 1988: 10th round, 270th overall pick

Career history
- Indianapolis Colts (1988–1990); Los Angeles Raiders (1991)*
- * Offseason or practice squad member only

Awards and highlights
- PFWA All-Rookie Team (1988)

Career NFL statistics
- Sacks: 4
- Stats at Pro Football Reference

O'Brien Darwin Alston (born December 21, 1965) is an American former professional football player who was a linebacker in the National Football League (NFL). He played college football for the University of Maryland from 1984 to 1987. The Indianapolis Colts selected Alston in the 10th round of the 1988 NFL draft. He played for Indianapolis for two seasons.

== Early life ==
Alston was born on December 21, 1965, in New Haven, Connecticut. He attended Oxon Hill High School in Oxon Hill, Maryland.

== College career ==
Alston attended the University of Maryland, where he played on the football team from 1984 to 1987. In 1986, against Pittsburgh on a pivotal third-down play, Alston recovered a fumble which was originally ruled an incomplete pass. The play helped seal a 10–7 Maryland victory. During the 1987 season, he led the team with 14 tackles for loss for 52 yards.

== Professional career ==
The Indianapolis Colts selected Alston in the 10th round of the 1988 NFL draft with the 270th overall pick. He played for two seasons with the Colts. In 1988, he saw action in 15 games and recorded three sacks. Against the Chicago Bears, Alston was moved to start at left outside linebacker in relief of Johnie Cooks. The Associated Press counted Alston among a number of rookies who "made big impacts" during the 1988 season.

In 1989, he played in four games and recorded one sack. Against the New York Jets, opposing running back Freeman McNeil threw a low and hard block for Roger Vick, which seriously injured Alston's left knee. Sports Illustrated wrote that McNeil "was so overcome with remorse" he "committed a flagrant act of compassion, all but taking himself out of a game." McNeil played poorly for the remainder of the game, in which he missed two blocking assignments and lined up incorrectly on a critical third-down play. After the game, he apologized to the crutch-bound Alston "with tears in his eyes". Alston told McNeil, "These things happen." He suffered a hyperextended knee, and ended the season on the injured reserve. On October 31, 1989, Alston was hospitalized, but listed in "satisfactory condition" after an automobile accident. He was charged with drunk driving and public intoxication related to the accident.

In August 1990, he agreed to undisclosed contract terms with the Colts, but did not play another game in the NFL. In 1992, Alston was selected by the San Antonio Riders in the eighth round of the World League of American Football draft.

== Personal life ==
He has three children - one son and two daughters. His daughters both played college sports. His youngest daughter college basketball and his oldest daughter attended Bowie State University, where she played on the volleyball team in 2009.
