= 1987 Clemson Tigers football team =

American college football season

1987 Clemson Tigers football

ACC champion Florida Citrus Bowl champion

Florida Citrus Bowl, W 35–10 vs. Penn State
- Conference: Atlantic Coast Conference

Ranking
- Coaches: No. 10
- AP: No. 12
- Record: 10–2 (6–1 ACC)
- Head coach: Danny Ford (9th full, 10th overall season)
- Offensive coordinator: Jack Crowe (2nd season)
- Captains: Michael Dean Perry; John Phillips
- Home stadium: Memorial Stadium

1987 Atlantic Coast Conference football standings
	Conf.					Overall
Team	W		L		T	W		L		T
No. 12 Clemson $	6	–	1	–	0	10	–	2	–	0
Virginia	5	–	2	–	0	8	–	4	–	0
Wake Forest	4	–	3	–	0	7	–	4	–	0
NC State	4	–	3	–	0	4	–	7	–	0
Maryland	3	–	3	–	0	4	–	7	–	0
North Carolina	3	–	4	–	0	5	–	6	–	0
Duke	2	–	5	–	0	5	–	6	–	0
Georgia Tech	0	–	6	–	0	2	–	9	–	0
$ – Conference champion; Rankings from AP Poll

The 1987 Clemson Tigers football team was an American football team that represented Clemson University in the Atlantic Coast Conference (ACC) during the 1987 NCAA Division I-A football season. In its tenth season under head coach Danny Ford, the team compiled a 10–2 record (6–1 against conference opponents), won the ACC championship, defeated Penn State in the 1988 Florida Citrus Bowl, was ranked No. 12 in the final AP Poll, and outscored opponents by a total of 333 to 176. The team played its home games at Memorial Stadium in Clemson, South Carolina.

Michael Dean Perry and John Phillips were the team captains. The team's statistical leaders included quarterback Rodney Williams with 1,486 passing yards, Terry Allen with 973 rushing yards, Gary Cooper with 618 receiving yards, and placekicker David Treadwell with 87 points scored (18 field goals, 33 extra points).

== Schedule ==
Date	Opponent	Rank	Site	Result	Attendance	Source
September 5	Western Carolina*	No. 9	Memorial Stadium; Clemson, SC	W 43–0	71,465	
September 12	at Virginia Tech*	No. 10	Lane Stadium; Blacksburg, VA	W 22–10	42,000	
September 19	No. 18 Georgia*	No. 8	Memorial Stadium; Clemson, SC (rivalry)	W 21–20	81,875	
September 26	Georgia Tech	No. 9	Memorial Stadium; Clemson, SC (rivalry)	W 33–12	78,832	
October 10	Virginia^{†}	No. 8	Memorial Stadium; Clemson, SC	W 38–21	79,963	
October 17	Duke	No. 7	Memorial Stadium; Clemson, SC	W 17–10	70,294	
October 24	NC State	No. 7	Memorial Stadium; Clemson, SC (Textile Bowl)	L 28–30	73,613	
October 31	Wake Forest	No. 14	Memorial Stadium; Clemson, SC	W 31–17	69,711	
November 7	at North Carolina	No. 10	Kenan Memorial Stadium; Chapel Hill, NC	W 13–10	53,115	
November 14	Maryland	No. 9	Memorial Stadium; Clemson, SC	W 45–16	76,773	
November 21	at No. 12 South Carolina*	No. 8	Williams–Brice Stadium; Columbia, SC (rivalry)	L 7–20	75,043	
January 1, 1988	vs. No. 20 Penn State*	No. 14	Florida Citrus Bowl; Orlando, FL (Florida Citrus Bowl)	W 35–10	53,152	
*Non-conference game; ^{†}Homecoming; Rankings from AP Poll released prior to the game

== Personnel ==
1987 Clemson Tigers football team roster
Players
Coaches
Offense

Pos.	#	Name	Class
TB	21	Terry Allen	Fr
WR	87	Keith Jennings	Jr
QB	13	Rodney Williams	Jr

Defense

Pos.	#	Name	Class
DT	91	Michael Dean Perry	Sr
CB	20	Donnell Woolford	Sr

Special teams

Pos.	#	Name	Class
K	18	David Treadwell	Sr

Head coach

- Danny Ford

Coordinators/assistant coaches

- Jack Crowe – Offensive coordinator

Legend

- (C) Team captain
- (S) Suspended
- (I) Ineligible
- Injured
- Redshirt

Roster
