= 1987 Duke Blue Devils football team =

American college football season

1987 Duke Blue Devils football
- Conference: Atlantic Coast Conference
- Record: 5–6 (2–5 ACC)
- Head coach: Steve Spurrier (1st season)
- Offensive scheme: Fun and gun
- Defensive coordinator: Richard Bell (5th season)
- Base defense: 3–4
- MVP: Steve Slayden
- Captains: Jason Cooper; Dave Demore; Dewayne Terry
- Home stadium: Wallace Wade Stadium

1987 Atlantic Coast Conference football standings
	Conf.					Overall
Team	W		L		T	W		L		T
No. 12 Clemson $	6	–	1	–	0	10	–	2	–	0
Virginia	5	–	2	–	0	8	–	4	–	0
Wake Forest	4	–	3	–	0	7	–	4	–	0
NC State	4	–	3	–	0	4	–	7	–	0
Maryland	3	–	3	–	0	4	–	7	–	0
North Carolina	3	–	4	–	0	5	–	6	–	0
Duke	2	–	5	–	0	5	–	6	–	0
Georgia Tech	0	–	6	–	0	2	–	9	–	0
$ – Conference champion; Rankings from AP Poll

The 1987 Duke Blue Devils football team represented Duke University as a member of the Atlantic Coast Conference (ACC) during the 1987 NCAA Division I-A football season. Led by first-year head coach Steve Spurrier, the Blue Devils compiled an overall record of 5–6 with a mark of 2–5 in conference play, and finished seventh in the ACC. Duke played home games at Wallace Wade Stadium in Durham, North Carolina.

== Schedule ==
Date	Opponent	Site	Result	Attendance	Source
September 5	Colgate*	Wallace Wade Stadium; Durham, NC	W 41–6	18,300	
September 12	Northwestern*	Wallace Wade Stadium; Durham, NC	W 31–16	19,600	
September 19	Vanderbilt*	Wallace Wade Stadium; Durham, NC	W 35–31	23,100	
September 26	at Virginia	Scott Stadium; Charlottesville, VA	L 17–42	35,500	
October 3	at Rutgers*	Rutgers Stadium; Piscataway, NJ	L 0–7	13,247	
October 17	at No. 7 Clemson	Memorial Stadium; Clemson, SC	L 10–17	70,294	
October 24	at Maryland	Byrd Stadium; College Park, MD	L 22–23	37,400	
October 31	Georgia Tech^{†}	Wallace Wade Stadium; Durham, NC	W 48–14	30,800	
November 7	at Wake Forest	Groves Stadium; Winston-Salem, NC (rivalry)	L 27–30	23,500	
November 14	NC State	Wallace Wade Stadium; Durham, NC (rivalry)	L 45–47	24,700	
November 21	at North Carolina	Kenan Memorial Stadium; Chapel Hill, NC (Victory Bell)	W 25–10	46,000	
*Non-conference game; ^{†}Homecoming; Rankings from AP Poll released prior to the game

== Personnel ==
1987 Duke Blue Devils football team roster
Players			Coaches
Offense: Pos. / # / Name / Class; QB / / Steve Slayden / Sr	Defense: Pos. / # / Name / Class	Special teams: Pos. / # / Name / Class	Head coach: Steve Spurrier; Coordinators/assistant coaches: Rod Broadway (DL); Legend: (C) Team captain; (S) Suspended; (I) Ineligible; Injured; Redshirt
