= 1987 TCU Horned Frogs football team =

American college football season

1987 TCU Horned Frogs football
- Conference: Southwest Conference
- Record: 5–6 (3–4 SWC)
- Head coach: Jim Wacker (5th season)
- Defensive coordinator: Tom Mueller (5th season)
- Home stadium: Amon G. Carter Stadium

1987 Southwest Conference football standings
	Conf.					Overall
Team	W		L		T	W		L		T
No. 10 Texas A&M $	6	–	1	–	0	10	–	2	–	0
Arkansas	5	–	2	–	0	9	–	4	–	0
Texas	5	–	2	–	0	7	–	5	–	0
Texas Tech	3	–	3	–	1	6	–	4	–	1
Baylor	3	–	4	–	0	6	–	5	–	0
TCU	3	–	4	–	0	5	–	6	–	0
Houston	2	–	4	–	1	4	–	6	–	1
Rice	0	–	8	–	0	2	–	9	–	0
$ – Conference champion; Rankings from AP Poll

The 1987 TCU Horned Frogs football team represented Texas Christian University (TCU) in the 1987 NCAA Division I-A football season. The Horned Frogs finished the season 5–6 overall and 3–4 in the Southwest Conference. The team was coached by Jim Wacker, in his fifth year as head coach. The Frogs played their home games in Amon G. Carter Stadium, which is located on campus in Fort Worth, Texas.

== Schedule ==
Date	Time	Opponent	Site	TV	Result	Attendance	Source
September 5		at Boston College*	Alumni Stadium; Chestnut Hill, MA		L 20–38	30,000	
September 12		at Air Force*	Falcon Stadium; Colorado Springs, CO		L 10–21	41,000	
September 19		BYU*	Amon G. Carter Stadium; Fort Worth, TX		W 33–12	22,615	
October 3		No. 10 Arkansas	Amon G. Carter Stadium; Fort Worth, TX		L 10–20	39,017	
October 10		at Rice	Rice Stadium; Houston, TX		W 30–16	11,700	
October 17		No. 2 (I-AA) North Texas State*	Amon G. Carter Stadium; Fort Worth, TX		W 19–10	23,291	
October 24		at Baylor	Baylor Stadium; Waco, TX (rivalry)		W 24–0	36,138	
October 31		Houston^{†}	Amon G. Carter Stadium; Fort Worth, TX		W 35–7	25,257	
November 7	12:00 p.m.	at Texas Tech	Jones Stadium; Lubbock, TX (rivalry)	Raycom	L 35–36	28,516	
November 14	12:00 p.m.	at Texas	Texas Memorial Stadium; Austin, TX (rivalry)	Raycom	L 21–24	63,642	
November 21		No. 16 Texas A&M	Amon G. Carter Stadium; Fort Worth, TX (rivalry)	Raycom	L 24–42	40,164	
*Non-conference game; ^{†}Homecoming; Rankings from AP Poll released prior to the game; All times are in Central time

== Roster ==
1987 TCU Horned Frogs football team roster
Players
Coaches
Offense

Pos.	#	Name	Class
WR	5	Scott Ankrom (injured)	Jr
FB	9	Scott Bednarski	Jr
TE	89	Kelly Blackwell	Fr
RB	27	Tony Jeffery	Sr
QB	17	David Rascoe	Jr

Defense

Pos.	#	Name	Class
DT	95	Mitchell Benson	Jr
CB	11	John Booty	Sr
FS	1	Falanda Newton	Jr
LB	56	Tracy Simien	Jr
DT	47	Fred Washington	So

Special teams

Pos.	#	Name	Class
P	7	Chris Becker	Jr

Head coach

- Jim Wacker

Coordinators/assistant coaches

Legend

- (C) Team captain
- (S) Suspended
- (I) Ineligible
- Injured
- Redshirt
