= 1987 Texas Tech Red Raiders football team =

American college football season

1987 Texas Tech Red Raiders football
- Conference: Southwest Conference
- Record: 6–4–1 (4–3–1 SWC)
- Head coach: Spike Dykes (1st season)
- Offensive coordinator: Dick Winder (1st season)
- Offensive scheme: No-huddle spread
- Defensive coordinator: Carlos Mainord (1st season)
- Base defense: 3–4
- Home stadium: Jones Stadium

1987 Southwest Conference football standings
	Conf.					Overall
Team	W		L		T	W		L		T
No. 10 Texas A&M $	6	–	1	–	0	10	–	2	–	0
Arkansas	5	–	2	–	0	9	–	4	–	0
Texas	5	–	2	–	0	7	–	5	–	0
Texas Tech	3	–	3	–	1	6	–	4	–	1
Baylor	3	–	4	–	0	6	–	5	–	0
TCU	3	–	4	–	0	5	–	6	–	0
Houston	2	–	4	–	1	4	–	6	–	1
Rice	0	–	8	–	0	2	–	9	–	0
$ – Conference champion; Rankings from AP Poll

The 1987 Texas Tech Red Raiders football team represented Texas Tech University as a member of the Southwest Conference (SWC) during the 1987 NCAA Division I-A football season. In their first season under head coach Spike Dykes, the Red Raiders compiled a 6–4–1 record (4–3–1 against SWC opponents), finished in fourth place in the conference, and outscored opponents by a combined total of 315 to 266. The team played its home games at Clifford B. and Audrey Jones Stadium in Lubbock, Texas.

== Schedule ==
Date	Time	Opponent	Site	TV	Result	Attendance	Source
September 5	6:00 pm	at No. 8 Florida State*	Doak Campbell Stadium; Tallahassee, FL	HSE	L 16–40	52,893	
September 12	7:00 pm	Colorado State*	Jones Stadium; Lubbock, TX		W 33–24	28,786	
September 19	7:00 pm	Lamar*	Jones Stadium; Lubbock, TX		W 43–14	27,795	
September 26	12:00 pm	at Baylor	Baylor Stadium; Waco, TX (rivalry)	Raycom	L 22–36	34,816	
October 3	12:00 pm	No. 15 Texas A&M	Jones Stadium; Lubbock, TX (rivalry)	Raycom	W 27–21	42,625	
October 10	7:00 pm	No. 20 Arkansas^{†}	Jones Stadium; Lubbock, TX (rivalry)		L 0–31	40,584	
October 17	1:00 pm	Rice	Jones Stadium; Lubbock, TX		W 59–7	25,314	
October 24	2:00 pm	Tulsa*	Jones Stadium; Lubbock, TX		W 42–7	24,341	
October 31	1:00 pm	at Texas	Texas Memorial Stadium; Austin, TX (rivalry)	HSE	L 27–41	74,984	
November 7	12:00 pm	TCU	Jones Stadium; Lubbock, TX (rivalry)	Raycom	W 36–35	28,516	
November 21	7:00 pm	at Houston	Houston Astrodome; Houston, TX (rivalry)		T 10–10	19,295	
*Non-conference game; ^{†}Homecoming; Rankings from AP Poll released prior to the game; All times are in Central time
