= D. D. Hoggard =

American football player (born 1961)

No. 27, 48
- Position: Cornerback

Personal information
- Born: May 20, 1961 (age 65); Ahoskie, North Carolina, U.S.
- Listed height: 6 ft 0 in (1.83 m)
- Listed weight: 188 lb (85 kg)

Career information
- High school: Bertie (Windsor, North Carolina)
- College: NC State (1979–1982)
- NFL draft: 1983: undrafted

Career history
- Washington Redskins (1983)*; Washington Federals (1984); Cleveland Browns (1985–1987); Philadelphia Eagles (1988)*; Buffalo Bills (1988)*
- * Offseason or practice squad member only
- Stats at Pro Football Reference

William Benjamin "D. D." Hoggard (born May 20, 1961) is an American former professional football cornerback who played three seasons with the Cleveland Browns of the National Football League (NFL). He played college football at NC State. He also played for the Washington Federals of the United States Football League (USFL).

== Early life ==
William Benjamin Hoggard was born on May 20, 1961, in Ahoskie, North Carolina. He attended Bertie High School in Windsor, North Carolina.

== College career ==
Hoggard was a member of the NC State Wolfpack of North Carolina State University from 1979 to 1982 and a three-year letterman from 1980 to 1982. He also participated in track and field at NC State and was a member of the 400 meter relay team that set an NCAA record with a time of 39.11 seconds in 1982. Hoggard graduated from NC State with a political science degree.

== Professional career ==
Hoggard was selected by the Washington Federals in the 12th round, with the 141st overall pick, of the 1983 USFL draft. He went undrafted in the 1983 NFL draft and signed with the Washington Redskins on April 28, 1983. He was released by the Redskins on July 30, 1983.

Hoggard signed with the Federals on November 1, 1983. He was moved to the developmental squad on March 2, 1984, released on March 7, and signed to the active roster on March 8. He played in one game, a start, for the Federals during the 1984 USFL season.

Hoggard signed with the Cleveland Browns on May 6, 1985. He was released on September 2 but re-signed on October 9. Hoggard then played in two games for the Browns before being released again on October 23. He signed a futures contract with the Browns on November 1, 1985. He appeared in all 16 games during the 1986 season. He also played in two playoff games that year. He was placed on injured reserve on September 7, 1987. Hoggard was later activated on December 25, 1987, and played in one game during the 1987 season. He also appeared in two playoff games that year, recording one safety. In January 1988, Browns head coach Marty Schottenheimer claimed that Hoggard "is probably the best kickoff coverage guy in the National Football League".

On March 25, 1988, Hoggard and a 1988 sixth round draft pick were traded to the Philadelphia Eagles for Chris Pike. Hoggard was released by the Eagles on August 16, 1988.

Hoggard was then claimed off waivers by the Buffalo Bills. On August 24, 1988, it was reported that Hoggard had been waived by the Bills.

== Personal life ==
Hoggard later worked for NC State's athletic department, including a stint as Director of Student Athlete Welfare.
