= 1987 North Carolina Tar Heels football team =

American college football season

1987 North Carolina Tar Heels football
- Conference: Atlantic Coast Conference
- Record: 5–6 (3–4 ACC)
- Head coach: Dick Crum (10th season)
- Captains: Carlton Bailey; Mark Maye
- Home stadium: Kenan Memorial Stadium

1987 Atlantic Coast Conference football standings
	Conf.					Overall
Team	W		L		T	W		L		T
No. 12 Clemson $	6	–	1	–	0	10	–	2	–	0
Virginia	5	–	2	–	0	8	–	4	–	0
Wake Forest	4	–	3	–	0	7	–	4	–	0
NC State	4	–	3	–	0	4	–	7	–	0
Maryland	3	–	3	–	0	4	–	7	–	0
North Carolina	3	–	4	–	0	5	–	6	–	0
Duke	2	–	5	–	0	5	–	6	–	0
Georgia Tech	0	–	6	–	0	2	–	9	–	0
$ – Conference champion; Rankings from AP Poll

The 1987 North Carolina Tar Heels football team represented the University of North Carolina at Chapel Hill during the 1987 NCAA Division I-A football season. The Tar Heels were led by tenth-year head coach Dick Crum and played their home games at Kenan Memorial Stadium in Chapel Hill, North Carolina. They competed as members of the Atlantic Coast Conference, finishing in sixth. Coach Dick Crum resigned at the end of the season, leaving as the school's all-time winningest coach.

== Schedule ==
Date	Time	Opponent	Site	Result	Attendance	Source
September 5	12:05 p.m.	Illinois*	Kenan Memorial Stadium; Chapel Hill, NC	W 34–14	40,000	
September 12	2:30 p.m.	at No. 1 Oklahoma*	Oklahoma Memorial Stadium; Norman, OK	L 0–28	75,004	
September 19	1:00 p.m.	at Georgia Tech	Grant Field; Atlanta, GA	W 30–23	33,151	
September 26	2:00 p.m.	at Navy*	Navy–Marine Corps Memorial Stadium; Annapolis, MD	W 45–14	23,636	
October 3	1:00 p.m.	No. 6 Auburn*	Kenan Memorial Stadium; Chapel Hill, NC	L 10–20	52,811	
October 10	1:00 p.m.	Wake Forest	Kenan Memorial Stadium; Chapel Hill, NC (rivalry)	L 14–22	52,000	
October 17	12:05 p.m.	at NC State	Carter–Finley Stadium; Raleigh, NC (rivalry)	W 17–14	57,400	
October 31	12:05 p.m.	at Maryland	Byrd Stadium; College Park, MD	W 27–14	35,425	
November 7	4:00 p.m.	No. 10 Clemson	Kenan Memorial Stadium; Chapel Hill, NC	L 10–13	53,115	
November 14	1:00 p.m.	at Virginia	Scott Stadium; Charlottesville, VA (South's Oldest Rivalry)	L 17–20	38,400	
November 21	12:05 p.m.	Duke	Kenan Memorial Stadium; Chapel Hill, NC (Victory Bell)	L 10–25	46,000	
*Non-conference game; Rankings from AP Poll released prior to the game; All times are in Eastern time

== Personnel ==
1987 North Carolina Tar Heels football team roster
Players
Coaches
Offense

Pos.	#	Name	Class
RB		Derrick Fenner
FB		Kennard Martin

Defense

Pos.	#	Name	Class

Special teams

Pos.	#	Name	Class

Head coach

- Dick Crum

Coordinators/assistant coaches

Legend

- (C) Team captain
- (S) Suspended
- (I) Ineligible
- Injured
- Redshirt
