= 1987 Texas A&M Aggies football team =

American college football season

1987 Texas A&M Aggies football

SWC champion Cotton Bowl Classic champion

Cotton Bowl Classic, W 35–10 vs. Notre Dame
- Conference: Southwest Conference

Ranking
- Coaches: No. 9
- AP: No. 10
- Record: 10–2 (6–1 SWC)
- Head coach: Jackie Sherrill (6th season)
- Offensive coordinator: Lynn Amedee (3rd season)
- Offensive scheme: Multiple
- Defensive coordinator: R. C. Slocum (8th season)
- Base defense: 3–4
- Home stadium: Kyle Field

1987 Southwest Conference football standings
	Conf.					Overall
Team	W		L		T	W		L		T
No. 10 Texas A&M $	6	–	1	–	0	10	–	2	–	0
Arkansas	5	–	2	–	0	9	–	4	–	0
Texas	5	–	2	–	0	7	–	5	–	0
Texas Tech	3	–	3	–	1	6	–	4	–	1
Baylor	3	–	4	–	0	6	–	5	–	0
TCU	3	–	4	–	0	5	–	6	–	0
Houston	2	–	4	–	1	4	–	6	–	1
Rice	0	–	8	–	0	2	–	9	–	0
$ – Conference champion; Rankings from AP Poll

The 1987 Texas A&M Aggies football team represented Texas A&M University as a member of the Southwest Conference (SWC) during the 1987 NCAA Division I-A football season. Led by sixth-year head coach Jackie Sherrill, the Aggies compiled an overall record of 10–2 with a mark of 6–1 in conference play, winning the SWC title for the third consecutive season. Texas A&M earned a berth in the Cotton Bowl Classic, where the Aggies defeated Notre Dame. The team played home games at Kyle Field in College Station, Texas.

== Schedule ==
Date	Opponent	Rank	Site	TV	Result	Attendance	Source
September 5	No. 6 LSU*	No. 15	Kyle Field; College Station, TX (rivalry)	ESPN	L 3–17	71,292	
September 19	No. 10 Washington*		Kyle Field; College Station, TX	ESPN	W 29–12	58,178	
September 26	vs. Southern Miss*	No. 16	Mississippi Veterans Memorial Stadium; Jackson, MS		W 27–14	22,150	
October 3	at Texas Tech	No. 15	Jones Stadium; Lubbock, TX (rivalry)	Raycom	L 21–27	42,625	
October 10	Houston		Kyle Field; College Station, TX		W 22–17	64,415	
October 17	at Baylor		Baylor Stadium; Waco, TX (rivalry)	Raycom	W 34–10	46,812	
October 24	at Rice		Rice Stadium; Houston, TX		W 34–21	32,500	
October 31	Louisiana Tech*		Kyle Field; College Station, TX		W 32–3	53,779	
November 14	No. 20 Arkansas	No. 19	Kyle Field; College Station, TX (rivalry)	ESPN	W 14–0	73,511	
November 21	at TCU	No. 16	Amon G. Carter Stadium; Fort Worth, TX (rivalry)	Raycom	W 42–24	40,164	
November 26	Texas	No. 15	Kyle Field; College Station, TX (rivalry)	ESPN	W 20–13	78,573	
January 1	vs. No. 12 Notre Dame*	No. 13	Cotton Bowl; Dallas, TX (Cotton Bowl Classic)	CBS	W 35–10	73,006	
*Non-conference game; Rankings from AP Poll released prior to the game

== Game summaries ==
=== Arkansas ===
	1	2	3	4	Total
Arkansas	0	0	0	0	0
Texas A&M	7	0	7	0	14

== Roster ==
1987 Texas A&M Aggies football team roster
Players			Coaches
Offense: Pos. / # / Name / Class; QB / / Bucky Richardson / Fr	Defense: Pos. / # / Name / Class	Special teams: Pos. / # / Name / Class	Head coach: Jackie Sherrill; Coordinators/assistant coaches: Lynn Amedee (offensive coordinator); R.C. Slocum (defensive coordinator; Curley Hallman (defensive backs); George Pugh; Legend: (C) Team captain; (S) Suspended; (I) Ineligible; Injured; Redshirt

== Team players drafted into the NFL ==
Player	Position	Round	Pick	NFL club
Keith Woodside	Running back	3	61	Green Bay Packers
Louis Cheek	Offensive tackle	8	220	Miami Dolphins
Kip Corrington	Defensive back	9	223	Detroit Lions
Chet Brooks	Defensive back	11	303	San Francisco 49ers
