= Michael Ball (American football) =

American football player (born 1964)

No. 31, 34
- Position: Safety

Personal information
- Born: August 5, 1964 (age 62); New Orleans, Louisiana, U.S.
- Listed height: 6 ft 0 in (1.83 m)
- Listed weight: 216 lb (98 kg)

Career information
- High school: New Orleans (LA) Washington
- College: Southern
- NFL draft: 1988: 4th round, 104th overall pick

Career history
- Indianapolis Colts (1988–1993); Denver Broncos (1994)*
- * Offseason or practice squad member only

Career NFL statistics
- Interceptions: 1
- Sacks: 1
- Fumble recoveries: 1
- Stats at Pro Football Reference

Michael Ball Jr. (born August 5, 1964) is an American former professional football player who played safety for six seasons for the Indianapolis Colts, from 1988 to 1993. He was selected 104th overall by the Colts in the fourth round of the 1988 NFL draft.
