= 1987 NC State Wolfpack football team =

American college football season

1987 NC State Wolfpack football
- Conference: Atlantic Coast Conference
- Record: 4–7 (4–3 ACC)
- Head coach: Dick Sheridan (2nd season)
- Home stadium: Carter Stadium

1987 Atlantic Coast Conference football standings
	Conf.					Overall
Team	W		L		T	W		L		T
No. 12 Clemson $	6	–	1	–	0	10	–	2	–	0
Virginia	5	–	2	–	0	8	–	4	–	0
Wake Forest	4	–	3	–	0	7	–	4	–	0
NC State	4	–	3	–	0	4	–	7	–	0
Maryland	3	–	3	–	0	4	–	7	–	0
North Carolina	3	–	4	–	0	5	–	6	–	0
Duke	2	–	5	–	0	5	–	6	–	0
Georgia Tech	0	–	6	–	0	2	–	9	–	0
$ – Conference champion; Rankings from AP Poll

The 1987 NC State Wolfpack football team represented North Carolina State University during the 1987 NCAA Division I-A football season. The team's head coach was Dick Sheridan. NC State has been a member of the Atlantic Coast Conference (ACC) since the league's inception in 1953. The Wolfpack played its home games in 1987 at Carter–Finley Stadium in Raleigh, North Carolina, which has been NC State football's home stadium since 1966.

== Schedule ==
Date	Opponent	Site	TV	Result	Attendance	Source
September 5	East Carolina*	Carter–Finley Stadium; Raleigh, NC (rivalry)		L 14–32	56,800	
September 12	at No. 18 Pittsburgh*	Pitt Stadium; Pittsburgh, PA		L 0–34	43,165	
September 19	at Wake Forest	Groves Stadium; Winston-Salem, NC (rivalry)		L 3–21	23,600	
September 26	Maryland	Carter–Finley Stadium; Raleigh, NC		W 42–14	44,300	
October 3	Georgia Tech	Carter–Finley Stadium; Raleigh, NC	Raycom	W 17–0	36,300	
October 17	North Carolina	Carter–Finley Stadium; Raleigh, NC (rivalry)		L 14–17	57,400	
October 24	at No. 7 Clemson	Memorial Stadium; Clemson, SC (Textile Bowl)		W 30–28	73,613	
October 31	at No. 19 South Carolina*	Williams–Brice Stadium; Columbia, SC		L 0–48	74,200	
November 7	East Tennessee State*	Carter–Finley Stadium; Raleigh, NC		L 14–29	35,400	
November 14	at Duke	Wallace Wade Stadium; Durham, NC (rivalry)		W 47–45	24,700	
November 21	Virginia	Carter–Finley Stadium; Raleigh, NC		L 31–34	35,200	
*Non-conference game; Rankings from AP Poll released prior to the game
