= Scott Secules =

American football player (born 1964)

No. 9, 10
- Position: Quarterback

Personal information
- Born: November 8, 1964 (age 61); Newport News, Virginia, U.S.
- Listed height: 6 ft 3 in (1.91 m)
- Listed weight: 220 lb (100 kg)

Career information
- High school: Chantilly (Chantilly, Virginia)
- College: Virginia
- NFL draft: 1988: 6th round, 151st overall pick

Career history
- Dallas Cowboys (1988); Miami Dolphins (1989–1992); New England Patriots (1993)

Awards and highlights
- First-team All-ACC (1987)

Career NFL statistics
- Passing attempts: 204
- Passing completions: 108
- Completion percentage: 52.9%
- TD–INT: 4–14
- Passing yards: 1,311
- Passer rating: 50.9
- Stats at Pro Football Reference

Thomas Wescott Secules (born November 8, 1964) is an American former professional football player who was a quarterback in the National Football League (NFL) for the Dallas Cowboys, Miami Dolphins and New England Patriots. He played college football for the Virginia Cavaliers.

== Early life ==
Secules attended Chantilly High School, where he played football, basketball and baseball. He was a member of the National Honor Society. He accepted a football scholarship from the University of Virginia.

After breaking his foot in a high school All-Star game before entering college, he was forced to redshirt his first season. He would spend the next three years as the backup quarterback behind Don Majkowski.

As a freshman, he started one game against the University of North Carolina Tarheels, in place of a suspended Majkowski (for breaking team rules).

As a junior in 1986, Secules started three games with Majkowski out with an injured shoulder, he won the three contests and received ACC offensive player of the week honors for his play against Wake Forest University. Against Clemson University in the second of those starts, he completed 30 of 49 attempts for 298 yards and 2 touchdowns to set school records for completions and attempts.

Secules was named the starter in his final year and although the team began the season 3–4, it won 5 straight games to finish with an 8–4 record. He also led one of the greatest comebacks in school history, with a 17–7 deficit against UNC in the final 4:44 minutes of the game, Secules passed for 2 touchdowns, en route to a 20–17 win. He received All-ACC honors (first Virginia quarterback since Bob Davis), while helping the school achieve its first home undefeated season since 1951 and reach its second bowl game in history, where they defeated Brigham Young University 22–16 in the All-American Bowl, with Secules being named the game's Most Valuable Player.

He finished his college career with 14 school records, including single-season passing yards (2,311), single-game passing yards (328), completions in a season (174), completion percentage in a career (56, 260 of 464), completion percentage in a season (58.8, 174 of 296), completion percentage in a game (80), 200-yard games (10) and most wins by a first-time starting quarterback (8). He suffered a serious right eye injury during a fight, that happened in the spring prior to the NFL draft, forcing him to have immediate surgery to repair the tear duct.

== Professional career ==
=== Dallas Cowboys ===
Secules was selected by the Dallas Cowboys in the sixth round (151st overall) of the 1988 NFL draft. Head coach Tom Landry saw potential in his training camp performances and made the uncommon moves of not having him take snaps in preseason games and keeping 4 quarterbacks at the start of the regular season. After Danny White was lost for the year in the third game, Secules became the third-string quarterback but was declared inactive in all 16 games. At the end of the season, the team also protected him in Plan B free agency.

In 1989, new head coach Jimmy Johnson brought in a new coaching staff and drafted two rookie quarterbacks (Troy Aikman and Steve Walsh), so he was traded to the Miami Dolphins in exchange for a fifth round draft choice (#120-James Gray) on August 6.

=== Miami Dolphins ===
In 1989, the Miami Dolphins acquired Secules because they wanted to develop a young quarterback behind Dan Marino. In 1992, he was passed on the depth chart by Scott Mitchell and was eventually placed on the injured reserve list with a shoulder injury. He only threw 70 passes in three regular seasons and saw action mostly as a holder, having only one meaningful appearance during his time in Miami, where he threw 2 interceptions when Marino got hurt in a 1989 loss against the Pittsburgh Steelers.

=== New England Patriots ===
On March 22, 1993, he was signed as a free agent by the New England Patriots. He was the backup to rookie Drew Bledsoe and became the starter in the fifth game of the season against the Phoenix Cardinals, helping the team to its first win. He would lose his next 3 starts and in the ninth game while playing against the Buffalo Bills, he suffered a separated left shoulder and was replaced by a healthy Bledsoe. He was released on April 21, 1994.

He finished his career with 108 completions in 204 attempts, 1,311 passing yards, 4 touchdowns and 14 interceptions in 57 games.

== Personal life ==
ESPN broadcaster Chris Berman once nicknamed him Scott "Won't You Let Me Take You on a" Secules; the nickname was a play on the lyrics of the song "Sea Cruise" by Frankie Ford.

Secules worked as the Senior Associate Athletic Director for External Affairs at Virginia Commonwealth University from November 2006 until October 2009. He currently serves as the Senior Regional Manager for Partner Development for Positive Coaching Alliance - a national non-profit that focuses on developing kids through sports done right.
