= List of Long Beach State 49ers head football coaches =

The Long Beach State 49ers college football team represented California State University, Long Beach in the Big West Conference. The 49ers competed in the National Collegiate Athletic Association (NCAA) College Division as an independent in its first three years (1958–1968), then in the California Collegiate Athletic Association (CCAA) from 1958 to 1968. In 1969, the team moved to National Collegiate Athletic Association (NCAA) Division I, and stayed there until the program was disbanded after the 1991 season.

The program had 9 head coaches in its 37 years of existence. Jim Stangeland led the 49ers to its only bowl game, a 1970 Pasadena Bowl matchup against the Louisville Cardinals.

== Coaches ==
No.	Coach	Tenure	Seasons	Win	Loss	Tie	Pct.	Bowls
1	Mike DeLotto	1955–1957	3	13	10	0	.565	0
2	Don Reed	1958–1968	11	57	47	2	.547	0
3	Jim Stangeland	1969–1973	5	31	24	2	.561	1
4	Wayne Howard	1974–1976	3	23	10	0	.697	0
5	Dave Currey	1977–1983	7	40	36	0	.526	0
6	Mike Sheppard	1984–1986	3	16	18	0	.471	0
7	Larry Reisbig	1987–1989	3	11	24	0	.314	0
8	George Allen	1990	1	6	5	0	.545	0
9	Willie Brown	1991	1	2	9	0	.182	0
	Totals	1955–1991	37	199	183	4	.520	1
