= Ken Visser =

American football coach (born 1946 or 1947)

Biographical details
- Born: c. 1946 or 1947 (age 78–79); Westminster, California, U.S.

Playing career
- 1963–1964: Orange Coast
- 1965–1966: Occidental
- Position: Linebacker

Coaching career (HC unless noted)
- 1967: Occidental (GA)
- 1968–1971: Occidental (LB)
- 1972–1973: Servite HS (CA) (DC)
- 1974–1978: Servite HS (CA)
- 1979–1980: Long Beach State (DB)
- 1981–1986: Long Beach State (DC/LB)
- 1987–1990: Long Beach State (AHC/DC)
- 1991–1993: Whittier
- 1994–2005: Chapman

Administrative career (AD unless noted)
- 1972–1978: Servite HS (CA)

Head coaching record
- Overall: 59–77–1 (college); 37–14–1 (high school)

Ken Visser (born c. 1946 or 1947) is an American former college football coach. He was the head football coach for Servite High School from 1974 to 1978, Whittier College from 1991 to 1993, and Chapman University from 1994 to 2005.

== Early life and playing career ==
Visser grew up in Westminster, California, and attended Westminster High School. After graduating high school he enrolled at Orange Coast where he played linebacker. With Orange Coast, he was a member of the 1963 team that won the Junior Rose Bowl—now known as the Pasadena Bowl. He transferred to Occidental after two years.

== Coaching career ==
After Visser graduated from Occidental, he rejoined the football team as a graduate assistant. In 1968, he was promoted to linebackers coach. After a total of five years with the team as a coach he left to become the defensive coordinator for Servite High School. In 1974, he was promoted to head football coach. In five years as head coach, he led the team to a 37–14–1 record, one conference championship, and five consecutive playoff appearances. During his tenure, he won 23 of his 37 games by shutout. He also served as the school's athletic director.

In 1979, Visser was hired from the high school ranks as the defensive backs coach for Long Beach State. In 1981, he was promoted to defensive coordinator and transitioned to coaching the linebackers. He was retained in 1984 when Dave Currey left the team and Mike Sheppard was hired. When Sheppard left and Larry Reisbig was hired, Visser was once again retained, but this time was promoted to assistant head coach. He survived a fourth head coaching change in his last season in 1990 when George Allen was hired.

In 1984, Visser was hired as the head football coach for Redlands. He later declined the position and returned to Long Beach State as an assistant. In 1985, he was a finalist for the head coach position for Northern Colorado, but Ron Simonson was chosen instead. A year later in 1986, he was a finalist for the head coach position for his junior college alma mater, Orange Coast, but ultimately stayed with Long Beach State.

In 1991, Visser was hired away from Long Beach State to become the head football coach for Whittier. He took over a program that had not won a game in the previous season and led them to a 3–6 record in his first year. With Whittier, he ran an multi-option i-bone offense and a 4–4 defense. In his last year he led the team to its best record since 1987 when they finished 4–5. In three seasons as head coach, Visser amassed an overall record of 10–17.

In 1994, Visser was hired to restart the Chapman football program which had been dormant since 1932. In the team's first three years since restarting they recorded a combined 21–5–1 record as an NCAA Division III independent. Over thirteen years as head coach, he guided the team to an overall record of 49–60–1. He finished his tenure without recording a winning season in his last six seasons. He retired after the 2005 season.

== Head coaching record ==
=== College ===
Year	Team	Overall	Conference	Standing	Bowl/playoffs
Whittier Poets (Southern California Intercollegiate Athletic Conference) (1991–1993)
1991	Whittier	3–6	2–3	4th	
1992	Whittier	3–6	2–4	T–5th	
1993	Whittier	4–5	3–3	T–3rd	
Whittier:		10–17	7–10		
Chapman Panthers (NCAA Division III independent) (1994–2005)
1994	Chapman	6–2–1			
1995	Chapman	8–1			
1996	Chapman	7–2			
1997	Chapman	4–5			
1998	Chapman	2–7			
1999	Chapman	5–4			
2000	Chapman	2–7			
2001	Chapman	3–6			
2002	Chapman	3–7			
2003	Chapman	3–7			
2004	Chapman	4–5			
2005	Chapman	2–7			
Chapman:		49–60–1			
Total:		59–77–1			

=== High school ===
Year	Team	Overall	Conference	Standing	Bowl/playoffs
Servite Friars () (1974–1978)
1974	Servite	7–2–1	4–1	1st	
1975	Servite	8–2	4–1	2nd	
1976	Servite	8–2	4–1	2nd	
1977	Servite	5–4	2–2	3rd	
1978	Servite	9–4	3–2	3rd	
Servite:		37–14–1	17–7		
Total:		37–14–1			
National championship Conference title Conference division title or championship game berth
