= 1987 San Jose State Spartans football team =

American college football season

1987 San Jose State Spartans football
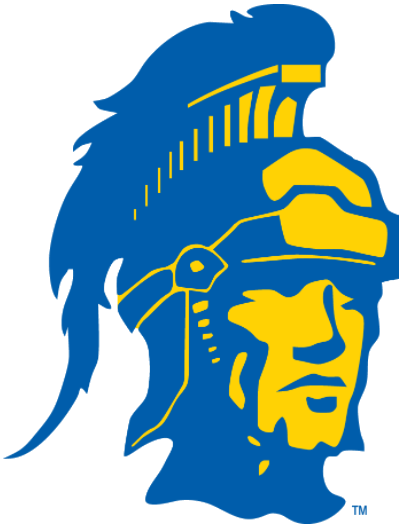

PCAA champion

California Bowl, L 27–30 vs. Eastern Michigan
- Conference: Pacific Coast Athletic Association
- Record: 10–2 (7–0 PCAA)
- Head coach: Claude Gilbert (4th season)
- Offensive coordinator: Rick Rasnick (1st season)
- Home stadium: Spartan Stadium

1987 Pacific Coast Athletic Association football standings
	Conf.					Overall
Team	W		L		T	W		L		T
San Jose State $	7	–	0	–	0	10	–	2	–	0
Fresno State	4	–	3	–	0	6	–	5	–	0
Cal State Fullerton	4	–	3	–	0	6	–	6	–	0
UNLV	4	–	3	–	0	5	–	6	–	0
Utah State	4	–	3	–	0	5	–	6	–	0
Pacific (CA)	3	–	4	–	0	4	–	7	–	0
Long Beach State	2	–	5	–	0	4	–	7	–	0
New Mexico State	0	–	7	–	0	2	–	9	–	0
$ – Conference champion

The 1987 San Jose State Spartans football team represented San Jose State University during the 1987 NCAA Division I-A football season as a member of the Pacific Coast Athletic Association. (Note: The Big West Conference was known as the Pacific Coast Athletic Association from its founding in 1969 through 1987.) The team was led by head coach Claude Gilbert, in his fourth year as head coach at San Jose State. They played home games at Spartan Stadium in San Jose, California. The Spartans finished the 1987 season as champions of the PCAA for the second consecutive season, with a record of ten wins and two losses (10–2, 7–0 PCAA).

As a result of the PCAA Championship, the Spartans qualified for a postseason bowl game against the Mid-American Conference (MAC) champion Eastern Michigan Eagles. The 1987 California Bowl was played in Fresno, California on December 12, with Eastern Michigan winning, 30–27.

== Schedule ==
Date	Opponent	Site	TV	Result	Attendance	Source
September 5	Eastern Illinois*	Spartan Stadium; San Jose, CA		W 24–3	18,237	
September 12	at California*	California Memorial Stadium; Berkeley, CA		W 27–25	44,000	
September 19	at Oregon State*	Parker Stadium; Corvallis, OR		L 34–36	24,342	
September 26	at Stanford*	Stanford Stadium; Stanford, CA (rivalry)		W 24–17	67,500	
October 3	Cal State Fullerton^{†}	Spartan Stadium; San Jose, CA		W 46–19	13,197	
October 10	New Mexico State	Spartan Stadium; San Jose, CA		W 57–6	15,362	
October 17	at Fresno State	Bulldog Stadium; Fresno, CA (rivalry)	ESPN	W 20–16	35,227	
October 24	UNLV	Spartan Stadium; San Jose, CA	ESPN	W 48–24	20,108	
October 31	at Utah State	Romney Stadium; Logan, UT		W 24–14	14,117	
November 7	Pacific (CA)	Spartan Stadium; San Jose, CA (Victory Bell)		W 42–17	20,324	
November 14	at Long Beach State	Veterans Stadium; Long Beach, CA		W 44–16	5,027	
December 12	vs. Eastern Michigan*	Bulldog Stadium; Fresno, CA (California Bowl)	ESPN	L 27–30	24,000	
*Non-conference game; ^{†}Homecoming

== Team players in the NFL ==
The following were selected in the 1988 NFL draft.

Player	Position	Round	Overall	NFL team
James Saxon	Fullback	6	139	Kansas City Chiefs
Mike Perez	Quarterback	7	175	New York Giants

The following finished their college career in 1987, were not drafted, but played in the NFL.

Player	Position	First NFL team
Greg Cox	Defensive back	1988 San Francisco 49ers
