= 1986 San Jose State Spartans football team =

American college football team

1986 San Jose State Spartans football
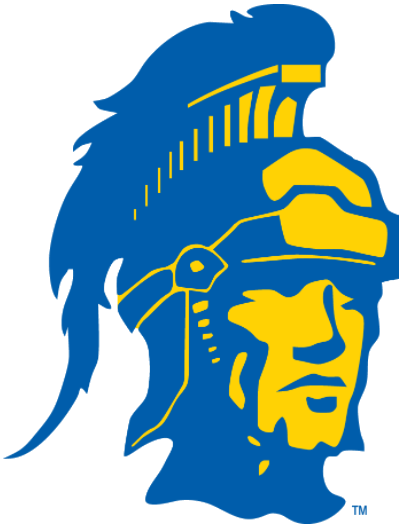

California Bowl champion PCAA champion

California Bowl, W 37–7 vs. Miami (OH)
- Conference: Pacific Coast Athletic Association
- Record: 10–2 (7–0 PCAA)
- Head coach: Claude Gilbert (3rd season)
- Defensive coordinator: Sam Gruneisen (1st season)
- Home stadium: Spartan Stadium

1986 Pacific Coast Athletic Association football standings
	Conf.					Overall
Team	W		L		T	W		L		T
San Jose State $	7	–	0	–	0	10	–	2	–	0
Fresno State	6	–	1	–	0	9	–	2	–	0
Long Beach State	4	–	3	–	0	6	–	5	–	0
UNLV	3	–	4	–	0	6	–	5	–	0
Utah State	3	–	4	–	0	3	–	8	–	0
Pacific (CA)	2	–	5	–	0	4	–	7	–	0
Cal State Fullerton	2	–	5	–	0	3	–	9	–	0
New Mexico State	1	–	6	–	0	1	–	10	–	0
$ – Conference champion

The 1986 San Jose State Spartans football team represented San Jose State University as a member of the Pacific Coast Athletic Association during the 1986 NCAA Division I-A football season. Led by third-year head coach Claude Gilbert, the Spartans compiled an overall record of 10–2 with a mark of 7–0 in conference play, winning the PCAA title. As a result of the PCAA championship, the San Jose State qualified for a postseason bowl game against the Mid-American Conference (MAC) champion Miami Redskins. The 1986 California Bowl was played in Fresno, California on December 13, with the Spartans victorious, 37–7. The team played home games at Spartan Stadium in San Jose, California.

== Schedule ==
Date	Opponent	Site	TV	Result	Attendance	Source
September 6	Oregon*	Spartan Stadium; San Jose, CA		L 14–21	23,150	
September 13	at Washington State*	Martin Stadium; Pullman, WA		W 20–13	15,000	
September 20	at Stanford*	Stanford Stadium; Stanford, CA (rivalry)		L 10–28	64,950	
September 27	at California*	California Memorial Stadium; Berkeley, CA		W 35–14	45,000	
October 4	No. 19 Fresno State	Spartan Stadium; San Jose, CA (rivalry)		W 45–41	28,158	
October 11	Utah State	Spartan Stadium; San Jose, CA		W 38–28	11,028	
October 18	at UNLV	Sam Boyd Silver Bowl; Whitney, NV		W 23–20	17,522	
October 25	at Pacific (CA)^{†}	Pacific Memorial Stadium; Stockton, CA (Victory Bell)		W 44–15	22,355	
November 1	at New Mexico State	Aggie Memorial Stadium; Las Cruces, NM		W 45–7	7,348	
November 8	at Cal State Fullerton	Santa Ana Stadium; Santa Ana, CA		W 48–24	3,754	
November 15	Long Beach State	Spartan Stadium; San Jose, CA		W 38–14	27,786	
December 13	vs. Miami (OH)*	Bulldog Stadium; Fresno, CA (California Bowl)	ESPN	W 37–7	26,000	
*Non-conference game; ^{†}Homecoming; Rankings from AP Poll released prior to the game

== Team players in the NFL ==
No San Jose State Spartans were selected in the 1987 NFL draft. The following finished their college career in 1986, were not drafted, but played in the NFL.

Player	Position	First NFL team
David Diaz-Infante	Guard - Center	1987 San Diego Chargers
Kenny Nash	Wide receiver	1987 Kansas City Chiefs
Kevin Clark	Defensive back	1987 Denver Broncos
Sam Kennedy	Linebacker	1988 San Francisco 49ers
