= 1987 UNLV Rebels football team =

American college football season

1987 UNLV Rebels football
- Conference: Pacific Coast Athletic Association
- Record: 5–6 (4–3 PCAA)
- Head coach: Wayne Nunnely (2nd season)
- Offensive coordinator: Carl Ferrill (1st season)
- Home stadium: Sam Boyd Silver Bowl

1987 Pacific Coast Athletic Association football standings
	Conf.					Overall
Team	W		L		T	W		L		T
San Jose State $	7	–	0	–	0	10	–	2	–	0
Fresno State	4	–	3	–	0	6	–	5	–	0
Cal State Fullerton	4	–	3	–	0	6	–	6	–	0
UNLV	4	–	3	–	0	5	–	6	–	0
Utah State	4	–	3	–	0	5	–	6	–	0
Pacific (CA)	3	–	4	–	0	4	–	7	–	0
Long Beach State	2	–	5	–	0	4	–	7	–	0
New Mexico State	0	–	7	–	0	2	–	9	–	0
$ – Conference champion

The 1987 UNLV Rebels football team was an American football team that University of Nevada, Las Vegas (UNLV) as a member of the Pacific Coast Athletic Association (PCAA) during the 1987 NCAA Division I-A football season. In their second year under head coach Wayne Nunnely, the Rebels compiled an overall record of 5–6 with a mark of 4–3 in conference play, placing in a four-way tie for second in the PCAA. The team played home games at the Sam Boyd Silver Bowl in Whitney, Nevada.

== Schedule ==
Date	Opponent	Site	Result	Attendance	Source
September 12	at Southwestern Louisiana*	Cajun Field; Lafayette, LA	L 10–21	16,241	
September 19	Baylor*	Sam Boyd Silver Bowl; Whitney, NV	L 14–21	27,128	
October 3	Nevada*	Sam Boyd Silver Bowl; Whitney, NV (Fremont Cannon)	W 24–19	25,584	
October 10	Utah State	Sam Boyd Silver Bowl; Whitney, NV	W 28–27	23,363	
October 17	at Cal State Fullerton	Santa Ana Stadium; Santa Ana, CA	L 14–28	6,019	
October 24	at San Jose State	Spartan Stadium; San Jose, CA	L 24–48	20,108	
October 31	at Fresno State	Bulldog Stadium; Fresno, CA	L 10–45	31,595	
November 7	Long Beach State	Sam Boyd Silver Bowl; Whitney, NV	W 30–17	16,071	
November 14	at New Mexico State	Aggie Memorial Stadium; Las Cruces, NM	W 29–6	4,219	
November 21	Pacific (CA)	Sam Boyd Silver Bowl; Whitney, NV	W 30–24	14,500	
November 28	Northern Illinois*	Sam Boyd Silver Bowl; Whitney, NV	L 31–34	14,650	
*Non-conference game
