= 1986 Long Beach State 49ers football team =

American college football season

1986 Long Beach State 49ers football
- Conference: Pacific Coast Athletic Association
- Record: 6–5 (4–3 PCAA)
- Head coach: Mike Sheppard (3rd season)
- Defensive coordinator: Ken Visser (6th season)
- Home stadium: Veterans Stadium

1986 Pacific Coast Athletic Association football standings
	Conf.					Overall
Team	W		L		T	W		L		T
San Jose State $	7	–	0	–	0	10	–	2	–	0
Fresno State	6	–	1	–	0	9	–	2	–	0
Long Beach State	4	–	3	–	0	6	–	5	–	0
UNLV	3	–	4	–	0	6	–	5	–	0
Utah State	3	–	4	–	0	3	–	8	–	0
Pacific (CA)	2	–	5	–	0	4	–	7	–	0
Cal State Fullerton	2	–	5	–	0	3	–	9	–	0
New Mexico State	1	–	6	–	0	1	–	10	–	0
$ – Conference champion

The 1986 Long Beach State 49ers football team represented California State University, Long Beach (Note: The official name of Long Beach State has been California State University, Long Beach since 1972. However, it is still commonly known as Long Beach State.) during the 1986 NCAA Division I-A football season.

Cal State Long Beach competed in the Pacific Coast Athletic Association. (Note: The Big West Conference was known as the Pacific Coast Athletic Association from its founding in 1969 through 1987.) The team was led by third-year head coach Mike Sheppard, and played home games at Veterans Stadium adjacent to the campus of Long Beach City College in Long Beach, California. They finished the season with a record of six wins and five losses (6–5, 4–3 PCAA).

== Schedule ==
Date	Opponent	Site	Result	Attendance	Source
September 6	at San Diego State*	Jack Murphy Stadium; San Diego, CA	L 24–27	23,594	
September 20	at Western Michigan*	Waldo Stadium; Kalamazoo, MI	W 14–13	10,089	
September 27	at No. 16 UCLA*	Rose Bowl; Pasadena, CA	L 23–41	48,140	
October 11	Cal State Fullerton	Veterans Memorial Stadium; Long Beach, CA	W 30–20	7,205	
October 18	at New Mexico State	Aggie Memorial Stadium; Las Cruces, NM	W 38–7	12,931	
October 25	at Fresno State	Bulldog Stadium; Fresno, CA	L 12–25	34,283	
November 1	at Utah State	Romney Stadium; Logan, UT	W 14–3	7,084	
November 8	Eastern Washington*	Veterans Memorial Stadium; Long Beach, CA	W 35–34	8,803	
November 15	at San Jose State	Spartan Stadium; San Jose, CA	L 14–38	27,786	
November 22	UNLV	Veterans Memorial Stadium; Long Beach, CA	L 8–31	5,197	
November 29	Pacific (CA)	Veterans Memorial Stadium; Long Beach, CA	W 38–21	4,200	
*Non-conference game; Rankings from Coaches' Poll released prior to the game

== Team players in the NFL ==
The following were selected in the 1987 NFL draft.

Player	Position	Round	Overall	NFL team
Charles Lockett	Wide receiver	3	66	Pittsburgh Steelers

The following finished their Cal State Long Beach career in 1986, were not drafted, but played in the NFL.

Player	Position	First NFL team
Kwante Hampton	Wide receiver	1987 Atlanta Falcons
