= 1987 Long Beach State 49ers football team =

American college football season

1987 Long Beach State 49ers football
- Conference: Pacific Coast Athletic Association
- Record: 4–7 (2–5 PCAA)
- Head coach: Larry Reisbig (1st season)
- Defensive coordinator: Ken Visser (7th season)
- Home stadium: Veterans Stadium

1987 Pacific Coast Athletic Association football standings
	Conf.					Overall
Team	W		L		T	W		L		T
San Jose State $	7	–	0	–	0	10	–	2	–	0
Fresno State	4	–	3	–	0	6	–	5	–	0
Cal State Fullerton	4	–	3	–	0	6	–	6	–	0
UNLV	4	–	3	–	0	5	–	6	–	0
Utah State	4	–	3	–	0	5	–	6	–	0
Pacific (CA)	3	–	4	–	0	4	–	7	–	0
Long Beach State	2	–	5	–	0	4	–	7	–	0
New Mexico State	0	–	7	–	0	2	–	9	–	0
$ – Conference champion

The 1987 Long Beach State 49ers football team represented California State University, Long Beach (Note: The official name of Long Beach State has been California State University, Long Beach since 1972. However, it is still commonly known as Long Beach State.) during the 1987 NCAA Division I-A football season.

Cal State Long Beach competed in the Pacific Coast Athletic Association. (Note: The Big West Conference was known as the Pacific Coast Athletic Association from its founding in 1969 through 1987.) The team was led by first-year head coach Larry Reisbig, and played home games at Veterans Stadium adjacent to the campus of Long Beach City College in Long Beach, California. They finished the season with a record of four wins and seven losses (4–7, 2–5 PCAA).

== Schedule ==
Date	Time	Opponent	Site	TV	Result	Attendance	Source
September 5	1:00 pm	Montana State*	Veterans Memorial Stadium; Long Beach, CA		W 51–15	3,606	
September 12	7:00 pm	Weber State*	Veteran's Stadium; Long Beach, CA		W 30–7	6,109	
September 19	1:00 pm	at Cal State Fullerton	Santa Ana Stadium; Santa Ana, CA		L 12–31	6,919	
September 26	10:00 am	at No. 14 Michigan*	Michigan Stadium; Ann Arbor, MI		L 0–49	101,714	
October 1	6:00 pm	at Fresno State	Bulldog Stadium; Fresno, CA	ESPN	L 7–30	32,215	
October 10	8:00 pm	at Pacific (CA)	Pacific Memorial Stadium; Stockton, CA	ESPN	W 9–6	9,747	
October 17	1:00 pm	New Mexico State^{†}	Veteran's Stadium; Long Beach, CA		W 33–6	6,309	
October 24	7:00 pm	at San Diego State*	Jack Murphy Stadium; San Diego, CA		L 42–52	23,625	
November 7	7:00 pm	at UNLV	Sam Boyd Silver Bowl; Whitney, NV		L 17–30	16,071	
November 14	1:00 pm	San Jose State	Veteran's Stadium; Long Beach, CA		L 16–44	5,027	
November 21	1:00 pm	Utah State	Veteran's Stadium; Long Beach, CA		L 14–17	2,659	
*Non-conference game; ^{†}Homecoming; Rankings from AP Poll released prior to the game; All times are in Pacific time
