= 1987 Fresno State Bulldogs football team =

American college football season

1987 Fresno State Bulldogs football
- Conference: Pacific Coast Athletic Association
- Record: 6–5 (4–3 PCAA)
- Head coach: Jim Sweeney (10th season)
- Home stadium: Bulldog Stadium

1987 Pacific Coast Athletic Association football standings
	Conf.					Overall
Team	W		L		T	W		L		T
San Jose State $	7	–	0	–	0	10	–	2	–	0
Fresno State	4	–	3	–	0	6	–	5	–	0
Cal State Fullerton	4	–	3	–	0	6	–	6	–	0
UNLV	4	–	3	–	0	5	–	6	–	0
Utah State	4	–	3	–	0	5	–	6	–	0
Pacific (CA)	3	–	4	–	0	4	–	7	–	0
Long Beach State	2	–	5	–	0	4	–	7	–	0
New Mexico State	0	–	7	–	0	2	–	9	–	0
$ – Conference champion

The 1987 Fresno State Bulldogs football team represented California State University, Fresno as a member of the Pacific Coast Athletic Association (PCAA) during the 1987 NCAA Division I-A football season. Led by tenth-year head coach Jim Sweeney, Fresno State compiled an overall record of 6–5 with a mark of 4–3 in conference play, tying for second place in the PCAA. The Bulldogs played their home games at Bulldog Stadium in Fresno, California.

== Schedule ==
Date	Opponent	Site	Result	Attendance	Source
September 5	at Washington State*	Martin Stadium; Pullman, WA	L 24–41	22,971	
September 12	Western Illinois*	Bulldog Stadium; Fresno, CA	W 20–17	34,325	
September 19	at No. 13 UCLA*	Rose Bowl; Pasadena, CA	L 0–17	49,264	
October 1	Long Beach State	Bulldog Stadium; Fresno, CA	W 30–7	32,215	
October 10	Southern Illinois*	Bulldog Stadium; Fresno, CA	W 35–0	34,523	
October 17	San Jose State	Bulldog Stadium; Fresno, CA (rivalry)	L 16–20	35,227	
October 24	at Pacific (CA)	Pacific Memorial Stadium; Stockton, CA	L 22–23	16,389	
October 31	UNLV	Bulldog Stadium; Fresno, CA	W 45–10	31,595	
November 7	Cal State Fullerton	Bulldog Stadium; Fresno, CA	W 21–17	33,522	
November 14	at Utah State	Romney Stadium; Logan, UT	L 13–17	8,281	
November 21	at New Mexico State	Aggie Memorial Stadium; Las Cruces, NM	W 34–10	2,621	
*Non-conference game; Rankings from Coaches' Poll released prior to the game

== Team players in the NFL ==
The following were selected in the 1988 NFL draft.

Player	Position	Round	Overall	NFL team
Mike Withycombe	Guard	5	119	New York Jets
Keith McCoy	Defensive back	11	291	Phoenix Cardinals
Jethro Franklin	Defensive end	11	298	Houston Oilers
