= David Diaz-Infante =

American football player and coach (born 1964)

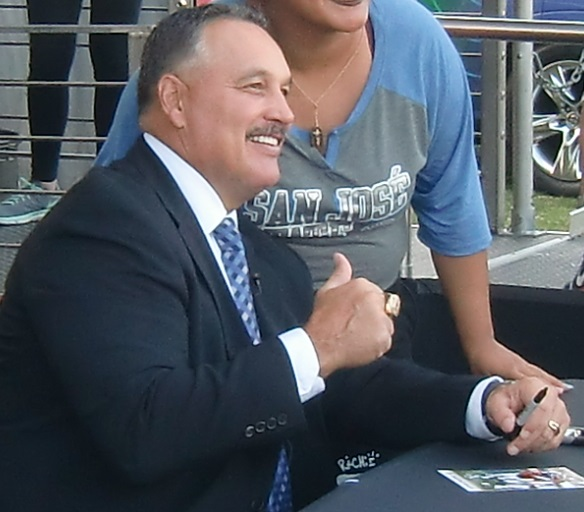
- Diaz-Infante at San Jose State homecoming in 2015

No. 63, 52
- Positions: Guard, long snapper, center

Personal information
- Born: March 31, 1964 (age 62); San Jose, California, U.S.
- Listed height: 6 ft 3 in (1.91 m)
- Listed weight: 295 lb (134 kg)

Career information
- High school: Bellarmine College Preparatory (San Jose)
- College: San Jose State
- NFL draft: 1987: undrafted

Career history

Playing
- San Diego Chargers (1987); Los Angeles Rams (1988–1989)*; Frankfurt Galaxy (1991–1992); San Francisco 49ers (1993)*; Sacramento Gold Miners (1993–1994); Denver Broncos (1995–1998); Philadelphia Eagles (1999); Denver Broncos (2000)*; Las Vegas Outlaws (2001); Denver Broncos (2001)
- * Offseason or practice squad member only

Coaching
- Arizona Cardinals (2013-2014) Offensive assistant; New York Jets (2016–2018) Assistant offensive line coach; Los Angeles Chargers (2020) Assistant offensive line coach; Bellarmine College Preparatory (2023-2025) Head coach

Awards and highlights
- 2× Super Bowl champion (XXXII, XXXIII); First-team All-PCAA (1986)

Career NFL statistics
- Games played: 69
- Games started: 9
- Tackles: 7
- Stats at Pro Football Reference

Gustavo David Miguel Diaz-Infante (born March 31, 1964) is an American former professional football player who was a guard and center in the National Football League (NFL). He played for the San Diego Chargers, Denver Broncos, and the Philadelphia Eagles. Diaz-Infante also played in the World League of American Football (WLAF) for the Frankfurt Galaxy, in the Canadian Football League (CFL) for the Sacramento Gold Miners and in the XFL with the Las Vegas Outlaws. Diaz-Infante played college football for the San Jose State Spartans. Inducted into SJSU Sports Hall of Fame, and Bellarmine College Prep Hall of Fame. Diaz-Infante was a Voice of Denver Broncos Color Analyst for the Denver Bronco's Radio Network. After the 2022 season, he was named the head coach of the Bellarmine Bells, the 7th football coach in the school's history. He resigned or was terminated in 2025.

== Early life ==
Diaz-Infante's father Marco Ignatio Infante was a Mexican immigrant to the U.S. and Zapatista. Diaz-Infante's mother is Finnish American. Born in San Jose, California, Diaz-Infante graduated from Bellarmine College Prep in 1982. He was later inducted into the Bellarmine College Prep Hall of Fame.

== College career ==
From 1982 to 1987, Diaz-Infante attended San Jose State University. He played at offensive guard for the San Jose State Spartans from 1983 to 1986. As a senior on the 1986 San Jose State Spartans football team that won the California Bowl, Diaz-Infante was team captain, honorable mention All-American, and first-team All-PCAA. He was later inducted into the SJSU Sports Hall of Fame.

== Professional career ==
Undrafted in 1987, Diaz-Infante signed as a free agent with the San Diego Chargers during the NFL Players Association strike that year. He played in three games off the bench.

Diaz-Infante then participated in training camp with the Los Angeles Rams in 1988 and 1989 but was released prior to the regular season. After spending 1990 out of football, Diaz-Infante continued his football career outside the NFL, with the Frankfurt Galaxy of the World League of American Football from 1991 to 1992.

In 1993, Diaz-Infante returned to the NFL with the San Francisco 49ers but was cut prior to the regular season. He then signed with the Sacramento Gold Miners of the CFL, where he would play in 1993 and 1994. He was nominated for CFL Offensive Lineman of the Year in 1994.

Signing with the Denver Broncos on March 30, 1995, Diaz-Infante was on the Broncos practice squad throughout 1995 before playing in nine games with two starts in 1996 at left guard, taking over for an injured Mark Schlereth. His first NFL start was in the November 24, 1996 game at the Minnesota Vikings; he is believed to be the oldest player to make his first career NFL start.

Then in 1997, Diaz-Infante played in all 16 regular season games with seven starts. With Schlereth again injured, Diaz-Infante started the last five regular season games at left guard. During all four postseason games, including the Super Bowl XXXII win, Diaz-Infante played at long snapper.

Due to a knee injury during training camp, Diaz-Infante was inactive for the first six games of the 1998 season before playing the last 10 regular season games at long snapper and other special teams roles. Diaz-Infante continued as long snapper for all three postseason games, including the Broncos' second straight Super Bowl win.

== Coaching career ==
Diaz-Infante was contacted by Todd Bowles, head coach for the New York Jets, in early January 2016 and offered the position of assistant offensive line coach, which he accepted.

In 2023, Diaz-Infante returned to Bellarmine College Prep as head football coach.

== Broadcasting career ==
Diaz-Infante served as a color analyst for ESPN, covering West Coast college football. Prior to this, he was an analyst for the Big East Network and a co-host of Denver AM radio station 760 The Zone's afternoon sports talk-show, with fellow former Broncos lineman Mark Schlereth. He has also served as a color analyst on Broncos radio broadcasts.
