= 1986 Utah State Aggies football team =

American college football season

1986 Utah State Aggies football
- Conference: Pacific Coast Athletic Association
- Record: 3–8 (3–4 PCAA)
- Head coach: Chuck Shelton (1st season)
- Offensive coordinator: Brian Billick (1st season)
- Defensive coordinator: Fred Bleil (1st season)
- Home stadium: Romney Stadium

1986 Pacific Coast Athletic Association football standings
	Conf.					Overall
Team	W		L		T	W		L		T
San Jose State $	7	–	0	–	0	10	–	2	–	0
Fresno State	6	–	1	–	0	9	–	2	–	0
Long Beach State	4	–	3	–	0	6	–	5	–	0
UNLV	3	–	4	–	0	6	–	5	–	0
Utah State	3	–	4	–	0	3	–	8	–	0
Pacific (CA)	2	–	5	–	0	4	–	7	–	0
Cal State Fullerton	2	–	5	–	0	3	–	9	–	0
New Mexico State	1	–	6	–	0	1	–	10	–	0
$ – Conference champion

The 1986 Utah State Aggies football team represented Utah State University during the 1986 NCAA Division I-A football season as a member of the Pacific Coast Athletic Association (PCAA). The Aggies were led by first-year head coach Chuck Shelton and played their home games at Romney Stadium in Logan, Utah. They finished the season with a record of three wins and eight losses (3–8, 3–4 PCAA).

== Schedule ==
Date	Opponent	Site	Result	Attendance	Source
September 6	at No. 18 BYU*	Cougar Stadium; Provo, UT (rivalry, Beehive Boot)	L 0–52	64,213	
September 13	at Missouri*	Faurot Field; Columbia, MO	L 10–24	35,548	
September 20	at Kansas*	Memorial Stadium; Lawrence, KS	L 13–16	36,300	
October 4	New Mexico State	Romney Stadium; Logan, UT	W 42–9	10,143	
October 11	at San Jose State	Spartan Stadium; San Jose, CA	L 28–38	11,028	
October 18	at Cal State Fullerton	Santa Ana Stadium; Santa Ana, CA	L 0–33	4,007	
October 25	UNLV	Romney Stadium; Logan, UT	W 7–6	11,270	
November 1	Long Beach State	Romney Stadium; Logan, UT	L 3–14	7,084	
November 8	at Pacific (CA)	Pacific Memorial Stadium; Stockton, CA	W 14–10	7,000	
November 15	Utah*	Romney Stadium; Logan, UT (Battle of the Brothers, Beehive Boot)	L 10–27	13,034	
November 22	at Fresno State	Bulldog Stadium; Fresno, CA	L 7–14	34,381	
*Non-conference game; Rankings from AP Poll released prior to the game
