= 1987 Utah State Aggies football team =

American college football season

1987 Utah State Aggies football
- Conference: Pacific Coast Athletic Association
- Record: 5–6 (4–3 PCAA)
- Head coach: Chuck Shelton (2nd season)
- Offensive coordinator: Brian Billick (2nd season)
- Defensive coordinator: Fred Bleil (2nd season)
- Home stadium: Romney Stadium

1987 Pacific Coast Athletic Association football standings
	Conf.					Overall
Team	W		L		T	W		L		T
San Jose State $	7	–	0	–	0	10	–	2	–	0
Fresno State	4	–	3	–	0	6	–	5	–	0
Cal State Fullerton	4	–	3	–	0	6	–	6	–	0
UNLV	4	–	3	–	0	5	–	6	–	0
Utah State	4	–	3	–	0	5	–	6	–	0
Pacific (CA)	3	–	4	–	0	4	–	7	–	0
Long Beach State	2	–	5	–	0	4	–	7	–	0
New Mexico State	0	–	7	–	0	2	–	9	–	0
$ – Conference champion

The 1987 Utah State Aggies football team represented Utah State University during the 1987 NCAA Division I-A football season as a Pacific Coast Athletic Association (PCAA) member. The Aggies were led by second-year head coach Chuck Shelton and played their home games at Romney Stadium in Logan, Utah. They finished the season with a record of five wins and six losses (5–6, 4–3 PCAA).

== Schedule ==
Date	Opponent	Site	Result	Attendance	Source
September 5	at No. 2 Nebraska*	Memorial Stadium; Lincoln, NE	L 12–56	75,910	
September 12	at Kentucky*	Commonwealth Stadium; Lexington, KY	L 0–41	55,249	
September 26	Cal State Fullerton	Romney Stadium; Logan, UT	L 11–30	15,786	
October 2	at BYU*	Cougar Stadium; Provo, UT (rivalry, Beehive Boot)	L 24–45	65,729	
October 10	at UNLV	Sam Boyd Silver Bowl; Whitney, NV	L 27–28	23,363	
October 17	Pacific (CA)	Romney Stadium; Logan, UT	W 17–13	8,775	
October 24	at Utah*	Robert Rice Stadium; Salt Lake City, UT (Battle of the Brothers, Beehive Boot)	W 41–36	27,394	
October 31	San Jose State	Romney Stadium; Logan, UT	L 14–24	14,117	
November 7	at New Mexico State	Aggie Memorial Stadium; Las Cruces, NM	W 25–6	10,318	
November 14	Fresno State	Romney Stadium; Logan, UT	W 17–13	8,281	
November 21	at Long Beach State	Veterans Stadium; Long Beach, CA	W 17–14	2,659	
*Non-conference game; Rankings from AP Poll released prior to the game
