= 1987 New Mexico Lobos football team =

American college football season

1987 New Mexico Lobos football
- Conference: Western Athletic Conference
- Record: 0–11 (0–8 WAC)
- Head coach: Mike Sheppard (1st season)
- Offensive coordinator: Ed Lambert (1st season)
- Defensive coordinator: Jack Stanton (1st season)
- Home stadium: University Stadium

1987 Western Athletic Conference football standings
	Conf.					Overall
Team	W		L		T	W		L		T
Wyoming $	8	–	0	–	0	10	–	3	–	0
BYU	7	–	1	–	0	9	–	4	–	0
Air Force	6	–	2	–	0	9	–	4	–	0
UTEP	5	–	3	–	0	7	–	4	–	0
San Diego State	4	–	4	–	0	5	–	7	–	0
Hawaii	3	–	5	–	0	5	–	7	–	0
Utah	2	–	6	–	0	5	–	7	–	0
Colorado State	1	–	7	–	0	1	–	11	–	0
New Mexico	0	–	8	–	0	0	–	11	–	0
$ – Conference champion

The 1987 New Mexico Lobos football team was an American football team that represented the University of New Mexico in the Western Athletic Conference (WAC) during the 1987 NCAA Division I-A football season. In their first season under head coach Mike Sheppard, the Lobos compiled a 0–11 record (0–8 against WAC opponents) and were outscored by a total of 444 to 209.

The team's statistical leaders included Barry Garrison with 3,163 passing yards, Shane Hall with 315 rushing yards, and Terance Mathis with 1,132 receiving yards and 48 points scored.

The number of televised games for the team expanded. KGSW-TV 14 (now KLUZ-TV) broadcast five of the team's road games; the first three and the final two; live. All of the home games were shown on a same-night basis, leaving only two contests (Colorado State and UTEP) not televised.

== Schedule ==
Date	Opponent	Site	Result	Attendance	Source
September 5	at Utah	Robert Rice Stadium; Salt Lake City, UT	L 20–24	29,112	
September 12	at New Mexico State*	Aggie Memorial Stadium; Las Cruces, NM (rivalry)	L 14–17	18,491	
September 19	at Arizona*	Arizona Stadium; Tucson, AZ (rivalry)	L 9–20	45,148	
September 26	BYU	University Stadium; Albuquerque, NM	L 25–45	22,286	
October 10	Hawaii^{†}	University Stadium; Albuquerque, NM	L 31–41	15,565	
October 17	at Colorado State	Hughes Stadium; Fort Collins, CO	L 13–35	24,555	
October 31	at UTEP	Sun Bowl; El Paso, TX	L 0–34	32,517	
November 7	Wyoming	University Stadium; Albuquerque, NM	L 16–59	13,244	
November 14	Air Force	University Stadium; Albuquerque, NM	L 26–73	15,309	
November 21	at San Diego State	Jack Murphy Stadium; San Diego, CA	L 30–53	21,392	
November 28	at Arkansas*	War Memorial Stadium; Little Rock, AR	L 25–43	27,200	
*Non-conference game; ^{†}Homecoming
