= 1986 Fresno State Bulldogs football team =

American college football season

1986 Fresno State Bulldogs football
- Conference: Pacific Coast Athletic Association
- Record: 9–2 (6–1 PCAA)
- Head coach: Jim Sweeney (9th season)
- Home stadium: Bulldog Stadium

1986 Pacific Coast Athletic Association football standings
	Conf.					Overall
Team	W		L		T	W		L		T
San Jose State $	7	–	0	–	0	10	–	2	–	0
Fresno State	6	–	1	–	0	9	–	2	–	0
Long Beach State	4	–	3	–	0	6	–	5	–	0
UNLV	3	–	4	–	0	6	–	5	–	0
Utah State	3	–	4	–	0	3	–	8	–	0
Pacific (CA)	2	–	5	–	0	4	–	7	–	0
Cal State Fullerton	2	–	5	–	0	3	–	9	–	0
New Mexico State	1	–	6	–	0	1	–	10	–	0
$ – Conference champion

The 1986 Fresno State Bulldogs football team represented California State University, Fresno as a member of the Pacific Coast Athletic Association (PCAA) during the 1986 NCAA Division I-A football season. Led by ninth-year head coach Jim Sweeney, Fresno State compiled an overall record of 9–2 with a mark of 6–1 in conference play, placing second in the PCAA. The Bulldogs played their home games at Bulldog Stadium in Fresno, California.

== Schedule ==
Date	Opponent	Rank	Site	Result	Attendance	Source
September 6	Montana State*		Bulldog Stadium; Fresno, CA	W 55–2	34,512	
September 13	Oregon State*		Bulldog Stadium; Fresno, CA	W 27–0	34,557	
September 27	Louisiana Tech*		Bulldog Stadium; Fresno, CA	W 34–10	34,528	
October 4	at San Jose State	No. 19	Spartan Stadium; San Jose, CA (rivalry)	L 41–45	28,158	
October 11	New Mexico State		Bulldog Stadium; Fresno, CA	W 17–14	34,546	
October 18	Pacific (CA)		Bulldog Stadium; Fresno, CA	W 10–9	34,551	
October 25	Long Beach State		Bulldog Stadium; Fresno, CA	W 25–12	34,283	
October 30	Cal State Fullerton		Bulldog Stadium; Fresno, CA	W 30–20	27,222	
November 6	at UNLV		Sam Boyd Silver Bowl; Whitney, NV	W 36–7	8,940	
November 15	at Hawaii*		Aloha Stadium; Halawa, HI (rivalry)	L 13–24	40,487	
November 22	Utah State		Bulldog Stadium; Fresno, CA	W 14–7	34,381	
*Non-conference game; Rankings from AP Poll released prior to the game

== Team players in the NFL ==
The following were selected in the 1987 NFL draft.

Player	Position	Round	Overall	NFL team
Stephen Baker	Wide receiver	3	83	New York Giants
Gene Taylor	Wide receiver	6	163	New England Patriots
Kevin Sweeney	Quarterback	7	180	Dallas Cowboys
Michael Stewart	Defensive back	8	213	Los Angeles Rams
David Grayson	Linebacker	8	217	San Francisco 49ers

The following finished their college career in 1986, were not drafted, but played in the NFL.

Player	Position	First NFL team
Anthony Mosley	Running back	1987 Chicago Bears
Cliff Hanneman	Linebacker	1987 Cleveland Browns
Greg Ramsey	Defensive end	1987 Seattle Seahawks
Greg Williamson	Defensive back	1987 Los Angeles Rams
Jim Williams	Running back	1987 Seattle Seahawks
