= 1986 Pacific Tigers football team =

American college football season

1986 Pacific Tigers football
- Conference: Pacific Coast Athletic Association
- Record: 4–7 (2–5 PCAA)
- Head coach: Bob Cope (4th season)
- Home stadium: Pacific Memorial Stadium

1986 Pacific Coast Athletic Association football standings
	Conf.					Overall
Team	W		L		T	W		L		T
San Jose State $	7	–	0	–	0	10	–	2	–	0
Fresno State	6	–	1	–	0	9	–	2	–	0
Long Beach State	4	–	3	–	0	6	–	5	–	0
UNLV	3	–	4	–	0	6	–	5	–	0
Utah State	3	–	4	–	0	3	–	8	–	0
Pacific (CA)	2	–	5	–	0	4	–	7	–	0
Cal State Fullerton	2	–	5	–	0	3	–	9	–	0
New Mexico State	1	–	6	–	0	1	–	10	–	0
$ – Conference champion

The 1986 Pacific Tigers football team represented the University of the Pacific (UOP) in the 1986 NCAA Division I-A football season as a member of the Pacific Coast Athletic Association. (Note: The Big West Conference was known as the Pacific Coast Athletic Association from its founding in 1969 through 1987.)

The team was led by head coach Bob Cope, in his fourth year, and played their home games at Pacific Memorial Stadium (Note: Amos Alonzo Stagg Memorial Stadium was known as Pacific Memorial Stadium from its opening in 1950 through 1987.) in Stockton, California. They finished the season with a record of four wins and seven losses (4–7, 2–5 PCAA). The Tigers were outscored by their opponents 174–252 over the season.

== Schedule ==
Date	Opponent	Site	Result	Attendance	Source
September 6	Sacramento State*	Pacific Memorial Stadium; Stockton, CA	W 31–7	21,000	
September 13	at Wyoming*	War Memorial Stadium; Laramie, WY	L 23–20	15,403	
September 20	New Mexico State	Pacific Memorial Stadium; Stockton, CA	W 41–14	13,500	
September 27	at Minnesota*	Hubert H. Humphrey Metrodome; Minneapolis, MN	W 24–20	50,270	
October 4	No. 4 UC Davis*	Pacific Memorial Stadium; Stockton, CA	L 45–41	15,000	
October 11	UNLV	Pacific Memorial Stadium; Stockton, CA	W 21–15	11,500	
October 18	at Fresno State	Bulldog Stadium; Fresno, CA	L 10–9	34,551	
October 25	San Jose State^{†}	Pacific Memorial Stadium; Stockton, CA (Victory Bell)	L 44–15	22,355	
November 8	Utah State	Pacific Memorial Stadium; Stockton, CA	L 14–10	7,000	
November 15	Cal State Fullerton	Pacific Memorial Stadium; Stockton, CA	L 39–38	2,200	
November 29	Long Beach State	Veterans Memorial Stadium; Long Beach, CA	L 38–31	4,200	
*Non-conference game; ^{†}Homecoming; Rankings from NCAA Division II Football Committee Poll released prior to the game

== Team players in the NFL ==
The following UOP players were selected in the 1987 NFL draft.

Player	Position	Round	Overall	NFL team
Tim Richardson	Running back	6	160	New York Giants
