= 1960 Long Beach Vikings football team =

American college football season

1960 Long Beach Vikings football

Metropolitan Conference champion Junior Rose Bowl champion

Junior Rose Bowl, W 38–16 vs. Tyler
- Conference: Metropolitan Conference
- Record: 10–0 (7–0 Metropolitan)
- Head coach: Jim Stangeland (4th season)
- Home stadium: Veterans Memorial Stadium

1960 Metropolitan Conference football standings
	Conf.					Overall
Team	W		L		T	W		L		T
Long Beach $	7	–	0	–	0	10	–	0	–	0
Bakersfield	6	–	1	–	0	9	–	1	–	0
Santa Monica	5	–	2	–	0	7	–	2	–	0
El Camino	4	–	3	–	0	5	–	4	–	0
East Los Angeles	3	–	4	–	0	5	–	4	–	0
San Diego Junior College	2	–	5	–	0	3	–	6	–	0
Los Angeles Valley	1	–	6	–	0	1	–	8	–	0
Harbor	0	–	7	–	0	0	–	9	–	0
$ – Conference champion

The 1960 Long Beach Vikings football team was an American football team that represented Long Beach City College as a member of the Metropolitan Conference during the 1960 junior college football season. In their fourth year under head coach Jim Stangeland, the Vikings compiled a perfect 10–0 record, won the championship, defeated Tyler in the Junior Rose Bowl, and outscored all opponents by a total of 282 to 127.

Key players included quarterback Dave Groff, halfback Dee Anderson, and fullback Lonzo Irvin.

The team played its home games at Veterans Memorial Stadium in Long Beach, California.

== Schedule ==
Date	Opponent	Site	Result	Attendance	Source
September 24	at Cerritos*	Falcon Stadium; Norwalk, CA	W 24–10	10,673	
October 1	Santa Ana*	Veterans Memorial Stadium; Long Beach, CA	W 24–19	5,686	
October 8	vs. San Diego Junior College	Falcon Stadium; Norwalk, CA	W 13–8		
October 15	El Camino	Veterans Stadium; Long Beach, CA	W 12–8		
October 21	at Harbor	Casey Field; Wilmington, CA	W 27–0		
October 29	at Bakersfield	Bakersfield, CA	W 27–7	18,358	
November 5	Santa Monica		W 51–24		
November 11	at Los Angeles Valley	Monarch Field; Van Nuys, CA	W 46–20		
November 18	at East Los Angeles	Husky Field; Los Angeles, CA	W 20–15		
December 10	vs. Tyler*	Rose Bowl; Pasadena, CA (Little Rose Bowl)	W 38–16	38,064	
*Non-conference game
