= Mike Knoll =

American football coach

Biographical details
- Born: October 1, 1951 (age 75)

Coaching career (HC unless noted)
- 1975–1977: Missouri Western (LB)
- 1978: New Mexico State (OLB)
- 1979: Tulsa (DL)
- 1980–1982: Tulsa (DC)
- 1983: Iowa State (DC)
- 1984: Miami (FL) (DB)
- 1985: Miami (FL) (LB)
- 1986–1989: New Mexico State
- 1990–1991: Northwestern (AHC/DC)
- 1992–1996: Tulsa (DC/ST/DL)
- 2004: Bacone (AHC/DC)
- 2005–2008: Upper Iowa
- 2010–2012: Northeastern State (AHC/DL/RC)

Head coaching record
- Overall: 15–73

Mike Knoll (born October 1, 1951) is an American former college football coach. He served as the head football coach at New Mexico State University from 1986 to 1989 and at Upper Iowa University from 2005 to 2008, compiling a career head coaching record of 15–73. Knoll also worked as an assistant coach at Missouri Western State University, the University of Tulsa, Iowa State University, the University of Miami, Northwestern University, Bacone College, and Northeastern State University.

== Coaching career ==
Knoll was the head football coach at New Mexico State University from 1986 to 1989, where he compiled a record of 4–40 (.100). He ended his stint at New Mexico State on a 17-game losing streak. New Mexico State won two games in 1987, and lost 10 or more games in 1986, 1988, and 1989. In each of his four seasons, the Aggies were outscored by 200 or more points.

== Head coaching record ==
Year	Team	Overall	Conference	Standing	Bowl/playoffs
New Mexico State Aggies (Pacific Coast Athletic Association / Big West Conference) (1986–1989)
1986	New Mexico State	1–10	1–6	8th	
1987	New Mexico State	2–9	0–7	8th	
1988	New Mexico State	1–10	0–7	8th	
1989	New Mexico State	0–11	0–7	8th	
New Mexico State:		4–40	1–27		
Upper Iowa Peacocks (NCAA Division II independent) (2005)
2005	Upper Iowa	3–8			
Upper Iowa Peacocks (Northern Sun Intercollegiate Conference) (2006–2008)
2006	Upper Iowa	3–8	3–5	T–6th	
2007	Upper Iowa	3–8	2–7	T–8th	
2008	Upper Iowa	2–9	2–8 / 0–6 (South)	T–11 / 7th (South)	
Upper Iowa:		9–33			
Total:		15–73			
