= 1987 New Mexico State Aggies football team =

American college football season

1987 New Mexico State Aggies football
- Conference: Pacific Coast Athletic Association
- Record: 2–9 (0–7 PCAA)
- Head coach: Mike Knoll (2nd season)
- Home stadium: Aggie Memorial Stadium

1987 Pacific Coast Athletic Association football standings
	Conf.					Overall
Team	W		L		T	W		L		T
San Jose State $	7	–	0	–	0	10	–	2	–	0
Fresno State	4	–	3	–	0	6	–	5	–	0
Cal State Fullerton	4	–	3	–	0	6	–	6	–	0
UNLV	4	–	3	–	0	5	–	6	–	0
Utah State	4	–	3	–	0	5	–	6	–	0
Pacific (CA)	3	–	4	–	0	4	–	7	–	0
Long Beach State	2	–	5	–	0	4	–	7	–	0
New Mexico State	0	–	7	–	0	2	–	9	–	0
$ – Conference champion

The 1987 New Mexico State Aggies football team was an American football team that represented New Mexico State University in the Pacific Coast Athletic Association during the 1987 NCAA Division I-A football season. In their second year under head coach Mike Knoll, the Aggies compiled a 2–9 record. The team played its home games at Aggie Memorial Stadium in Las Cruces, New Mexico.

== Schedule ==
Date	Opponent	Site	Result	Attendance	Source
September 5	at UTEP*	Sun Bowl; El Paso, TX (rivalry)	L 0–31	45,819	
September 12	New Mexico*	Aggie Memorial Stadium; Las Cruces, NM (rivalry)	W 17–14	18,491	
September 26	Angelo State*	Aggie Memorial Stadium; Las Cruces, NM	L 17–21	14,156	
October 3	at Pacific (CA)	Pacific Memorial Stadium; Stockton, CA	L 7–23	9,817	
October 10	at San Jose State	Spartan Stadium; San Jose, CA	L 6–57	15,362	
October 17	at Long Beach State	Veterans Memorial Stadium; Long Beach, CA	L 6–33	6,309	
October 24	McNeese State*	Aggie Memorial Stadium; Las Cruces, NM	W 32–13		
October 31	at Cal State Fullerton	Santa Ana Stadium; Santa Ana, CA	L 14–48	2,031	
November 7	Utah State	Aggie Memorial Stadium; Las Cruces, NM	L 6–25	10,318	
November 14	UNLV	Aggie Memorial Stadium; Las Cruces, NM	L 6–29	4,219	
November 21	Fresno State	Aggie Memorial Stadium; Las Cruces, NM	L 10–34	2,621	
*Non-conference game
