= 1987 Cal State Fullerton Titans football team =

American college football season

1987 Cal State Fullerton Titans football
- Conference: Pacific Coast Athletic Association
- Record: 6–6 (4–3 PCAA)
- Head coach: Gene Murphy (8th season)
- Defensive coordinator: Steve Hall (2nd season)
- Home stadium: Santa Ana Stadium

1987 Pacific Coast Athletic Association football standings
	Conf.					Overall
Team	W		L		T	W		L		T
San Jose State $	7	–	0	–	0	10	–	2	–	0
Fresno State	4	–	3	–	0	6	–	5	–	0
Cal State Fullerton	4	–	3	–	0	6	–	6	–	0
UNLV	4	–	3	–	0	5	–	6	–	0
Utah State	4	–	3	–	0	5	–	6	–	0
Pacific (CA)	3	–	4	–	0	4	–	7	–	0
Long Beach State	2	–	5	–	0	4	–	7	–	0
New Mexico State	0	–	7	–	0	2	–	9	–	0
$ – Conference champion

The 1987 Cal State Fullerton Titans football team represented California State University, Fullerton as a member of the Pacific Coast Athletic Association (PCAA) during the 1987 NCAA Division I-A football season. Led by eighth-year head coach Gene Murphy, Cal State Fullerton compiled an overall record of 6–6 with a mark of 4–3 in conference play, placing in a four-way tie for second in the PCAA. The Titans played their home games at Santa Ana Stadium in Santa Ana, California.

== Schedule ==
Date	Opponent	Site	Result	Attendance	Source
September 5	at Hawaii*	Aloha Stadium; Halawa, HI	L 0–44	45,408	
September 12	at No. 6 LSU*	Tiger Stadium; Baton Rouge, LA	L 12–56	73,452	
September 19	Long Beach State	Santa Ana Stadium; Santa Ana, CA	W 31–12	6,919	
September 26	at Utah State	Romney Stadium; Logan, UT	W 30–11	15,786	
October 3	at San Jose State	Spartan Stadium; San Jose, CA	L 19–46	13,197	
October 10	at No. 18 Florida*	Florida Field; Gainesville, FL	L 0–65	72,336	
October 17	UNLV	Santa Ana Stadium; Santa Ana, CA	W 28–14	6,019	
October 24	at Northern Illinois*	Huskie Stadium; DeKalb, IL	W 21–20	7,325	
October 31	New Mexico State	Santa Ana Stadium; Santa Ana, CA	W 48–14	2,031	
November 7	at Fresno State	Bulldog Stadium; Fresno, CA	L 17–21	33,522	
November 14	Pacific (CA)	Santa Ana Stadium; Santa Ana, CA	L 14–22	3,114	
November 21	Montana*	Santa Ana Stadium; Santa Ana, CA	W 43–26	2,141	
*Non-conference game; Rankings from AP Poll released prior to the game

== Team players in the NFL ==
The following Cal State Fullerton players were selected in the 1988 NFL draft.

Player	Position	Round	Overall	NFL team
James Thornton	Tight end	4	105	Chicago Bears
Todd White	Wide receiver	7	176	Philadelphia Eagles
