= 1986 New Mexico State Aggies football team =

American college football season

1986 New Mexico State Aggies football
- Conference: Pacific Coast Athletic Association
- Record: 1–10 (1–6 PCAA)
- Head coach: Mike Knoll (1st season)
- Home stadium: Aggie Memorial Stadium

1986 Pacific Coast Athletic Association football standings
	Conf.					Overall
Team	W		L		T	W		L		T
San Jose State $	7	–	0	–	0	10	–	2	–	0
Fresno State	6	–	1	–	0	9	–	2	–	0
Long Beach State	4	–	3	–	0	6	–	5	–	0
UNLV	3	–	4	–	0	6	–	5	–	0
Utah State	3	–	4	–	0	3	–	8	–	0
Pacific (CA)	2	–	5	–	0	4	–	7	–	0
Cal State Fullerton	2	–	5	–	0	3	–	9	–	0
New Mexico State	1	–	6	–	0	1	–	10	–	0
$ – Conference champion

The 1986 New Mexico State Aggies football team was an American football team that represented New Mexico State University in the Pacific Coast Athletic Association during the 1986 NCAA Division I-A football season. In their first year under head coach Mike Knoll, the Aggies compiled a 1–10 record. The team played its home games at Aggie Memorial Stadium in Las Cruces, New Mexico.

== Schedule ==
Date	Opponent	Site	Result	Attendance	Source
August 30	Angelo State*	Aggie Memorial Stadium; Las Cruces, NM	L 21–28	14,778	
September 6	Cal State Fullerton	Aggie Memorial Stadium; Las Cruces, NM	W 24–21	12,896	
September 13	UTEP*	Aggie Memorial Stadium; Las Cruces, NM (rivalry)	L 33–47	32,904	
September 20	at Pacific (CA)	Pacific Memorial Stadium; Stockton, CA	L 14–41	13,500	
September 27	at No. 9 Arkansas*	War Memorial Stadium; Little Rock, AR	L 11–42	55,106	
October 4	at Utah State	Romney Stadium; Logan, UT	L 9–42	10,143	
October 11	at Fresno State	Bulldog Stadium; Fresno, CA	L 14–17	34,546	
October 18	Long Beach State	Aggie Memorial Stadium; Las Cruces, NM	L 7–38	12,931	
October 25	at New Mexico*	University Stadium; Albuquerque, NM (rivalry)	L 14–45	17,392	
November 1	San Jose State	Aggie Memorial Stadium; Las Cruces, NM	L 7–45	7,348	
November 15	UNLV	Aggie Memorial Stadium; Las Cruces, NM	L 42–58	9,283	
*Non-conference game; Rankings from AP Poll released prior to the game
