= 1986 UNLV Rebels football team =

American college football season

1986 UNLV Rebels football
- Conference: Pacific Coast Athletic Association
- Record: 6–5 (3–4 PCAA)
- Head coach: Wayne Nunnely (1st season)
- Home stadium: Sam Boyd Silver Bowl

1986 Pacific Coast Athletic Association football standings
| | Conf. | | | | | Overall |
| Team | W | | L | | T | W | | L | | T |
|---|---|---|---|---|---|---|---|---|---|---|
| San Jose State $ | 7 | – | 0 | – | 0 | 10 | – | 2 | – | 0 |
| Fresno State | 6 | – | 1 | – | 0 | 9 | – | 2 | – | 0 |
| Long Beach State | 4 | – | 3 | – | 0 | 6 | – | 5 | – | 0 |
| UNLV | 3 | – | 4 | – | 0 | 6 | – | 5 | – | 0 |
| Utah State | 3 | – | 4 | – | 0 | 3 | – | 8 | – | 0 |
| Pacific (CA) | 2 | – | 5 | – | 0 | 4 | – | 7 | – | 0 |
| Cal State Fullerton | 2 | – | 5 | – | 0 | 3 | – | 9 | – | 0 |
| New Mexico State | 1 | – | 6 | – | 0 | 1 | – | 10 | – | 0 |
$ – Conference champion

The 1986 UNLV Rebels football team was an American football team that represented the University of Nevada, Las Vegas (UNLV) as a member of the Pacific Coast Athletic Association (PCAA) during the 1986 NCAA Division I-A football season. In their first year under head coach Wayne Nunnely, the Rebels compiled an overall record of 6–5 with a mark of 3–4 in conference play, tying for fourth place in the PCAA. The team played home games at the Sam Boyd Silver Bowl in Whitney, Nevada.

== Schedule ==
| Date | Opponent | Site | Result | Attendance | Source |
|---|---|---|---|---|---|
| September 6 | at Washington State* | Martin Stadium; Pullman, WA | L 14–34 | 17,000 | |
| September 13 | Portland State* | Sam Boyd Silver Bowl; Whitney, NV | W 51–14 | 12,561 | |
| September 20 | Wisconsin* | Sam Boyd Silver Bowl; Whitney, NV | W 17–7 | 32,207 | |
| September 27 | Cal State Fullerton | Sam Boyd Silver Bowl; Whitney, NV | W 40–23 | 20,101 | |
| October 11 | at Pacific (CA) | Pacific Memorial Stadium; Stockton, CA | L 15–21 | 11,500 | |
| October 18 | San Jose State | Sam Boyd Silver Bowl; Whitney, NV | L 20–23 | 17,522 | |
| October 25 | at Utah State | Romney Stadium; Logan, UT | L 6–7 | 11,270 | |
| November 1 | North Texas State* | Sam Boyd Silver Bowl; Whitney, NV | W 27–26 | 12,131 | |
| November 6 | Fresno State | Sam Boyd Silver Bowl; Whitney, NV | L 7–36 | 8,940 | |
| November 15 | at New Mexico State | Aggie Memorial Stadium; Las Cruces, NM | W 58–42 | 9,283 | |
| November 22 | at Long Beach State | Veterans Memorial Stadium; Long Beach, CA | W 31–8 | 5,197 | |
*Non-conference game
