= 1986 Cal State Fullerton Titans football team =

American college football season

1986 Cal State Fullerton Titans football
- Conference: Pacific Coast Athletic Association
- Record: 3–9 (2–5 PCAA)
- Head coach: Gene Murphy (7th season)
- Defensive coordinator: Steve Hall (1st season)
- Home stadium: Santa Ana Stadium

1986 Pacific Coast Athletic Association football standings
	Conf.					Overall
Team	W		L		T	W		L		T
San Jose State $	7	–	0	–	0	10	–	2	–	0
Fresno State	6	–	1	–	0	9	–	2	–	0
Long Beach State	4	–	3	–	0	6	–	5	–	0
UNLV	3	–	4	–	0	6	–	5	–	0
Utah State	3	–	4	–	0	3	–	8	–	0
Pacific (CA)	2	–	5	–	0	4	–	7	–	0
Cal State Fullerton	2	–	5	–	0	3	–	9	–	0
New Mexico State	1	–	6	–	0	1	–	10	–	0
$ – Conference champion

The 1986 Cal State Fullerton Titans football team represented California State University, Fullerton as a member of the Pacific Coast Athletic Association (PCAA) during the 1986 NCAA Division I-A football season. Led by seventh-year head coach Gene Murphy, Cal State Fullerton compiled an overall record of 3–9 with a mark of 2–5 in conference play, tying for sixth place in the PCAA. The Titans played their home games at Santa Ana Stadium in Santa Ana, California.

== Schedule ==
Date	Opponent	Site	TV	Result	Attendance	Source
August 30	at Nevada*	Mackay Stadium; Reno, NV		L 3–49	13,062	
September 6	at New Mexico State	Aggie Memorial Stadium; Las Cruces, NM		L 21–24	12,896	
September 13	Idaho State*	Santa Ana Stadium; Santa Ana, CA		W 35–25	3,722	
September 20	at Idaho*	Kibbie Dome; Moscow, ID		L 17–25	12,500	
September 27	at UNLV	Sam Boyd Silver Bowl; Whitney, NV		L 23–40	20,101	
October 2	at Tulsa*	Skelly Stadium; Tulsa, OK	ESPN	L 10–20	11,988	
October 11	at Long Beach State	Veterans Stadium; Long Beach, CA		L 20–30	7,205	
October 18	Utah State	Santa Ana Stadium; Santa Ana, CA		W 33–0	4,007	
October 25	at Hawaii*	Aloha Stadium; Halawa, HI		L 15–26	34,530	
November 1	at Fresno State	Bulldog Stadium; Fresno, CA		L 20–30	27,222	
November 8	San Jose State	Santa Ana Stadium; Santa Ana, CA		L 24–48	3,754	
November 15	at Pacific (CA)	Pacific Memorial Stadium; Stockton, CA		W 39–38	2,200	
*Non-conference game

== Team players in the NFL ==
The following Cal State Fullerton Titans were selected in the 1987 NFL draft.

Player	Position	Round	Overall	NFL team
Corn Redick	Wide receiver	7	169	Philadelphia Eagles
Hank Goebel	Tackle	8	216	Los Angeles Rams
Rick Calhoun	Running back	9	230	Detroit Lions
Ron McLean	Nose tackle – Defensive end	9	241	New York Jets

The following finished their college career in 1986, were not drafted, but played in the NFL.

Player	Position	First NFL team
Vince Abbott	Kicker	1987 San Diego Chargers
