= 1987 Pacific Tigers football team =

American college football season

1987 Pacific Tigers football
- Conference: Pacific Coast Athletic Association
- Record: 4–7 (3–4 PCAA)
- Head coach: Bob Cope (5th season)
- Home stadium: Pacific Memorial Stadium

1987 Pacific Coast Athletic Association football standings
	Conf.					Overall
Team	W		L		T	W		L		T
San Jose State $	7	–	0	–	0	10	–	2	–	0
Fresno State	4	–	3	–	0	6	–	5	–	0
Cal State Fullerton	4	–	3	–	0	6	–	6	–	0
UNLV	4	–	3	–	0	5	–	6	–	0
Utah State	4	–	3	–	0	5	–	6	–	0
Pacific (CA)	3	–	4	–	0	4	–	7	–	0
Long Beach State	2	–	5	–	0	4	–	7	–	0
New Mexico State	0	–	7	–	0	2	–	9	–	0
$ – Conference champion

The 1987 Pacific Tigers football team represented the University of the Pacific (UOP) in the 1987 NCAA Division I-A football season as a member of the Pacific Coast Athletic Association. (Note: The Big West Conference was known as the Pacific Coast Athletic Association from its founding in 1969 through 1987.)

The team was led by head coach Bob Cope, in his fifth year, and played home games at Pacific Memorial Stadium (Note: Amos Alonzo Stagg Memorial Stadium was known as Pacific Memorial Stadium from its opening in 1950 through 1987.) in Stockton, California. They finished the season with a record of four wins and seven losses (4–7, 3–4 PCAA). The Tigers were outscored by their opponents 174–252 over the season.

== Schedule ==
Date	Opponent	Site	Result	Attendance	Source
September 5	at California*	California Memorial Stadium; Berkeley, CA	L 0–42	37,000	
September 12	Sacramento State*	Pacific Memorial Stadium; Stockton, CA	W 31–7	18,025	
September 19	at No. 15 Arizona State*	Sun Devil Stadium; Tempe, AZ	L 12–31	70,091	
September 26	at No. 18 Washington*	Husky Stadium; Seattle, WA	L 3–31	69,605	
October 3	New Mexico State	Pacific Memorial Stadium; Stockton, CA	W 23–7	9,817	
October 10	Long Beach State	Pacific Memorial Stadium; Stockton, CA	L 6–9	9,747	
October 17	at Utah State	Romney Stadium; Logan, UT	L 13–17	8,775	
October 24	Fresno State^{†}	Pacific Memorial Stadium; Stockton, CA	W 23–22	16,389	
November 7	at San Jose State	Spartan Stadium; San Jose, CA (Victory Bell)	L 17–42	20,324	
November 14	at Cal State Fullerton	Santa Ana Stadium; Santa Ana, CA	W 22–14	3,114	
November 21	at UNLV	Sam Boyd Silver Bowl; Whitney, NV	L 24–30	14,500	
*Non-conference game; ^{†}Homecoming; Rankings from Coaches' Poll released prior to the game
