= Brian Bedford (gridiron football) =

American football player (born 1965)

Profile
- Position: Wide receiver

Personal information
- Born: June 29, 1965 (age 61); Milwaukee, Wisconsin, U.S.
- Listed height: 6 ft 4 in (1.93 m)
- Listed weight: 205 lb (93 kg)

Career information
- High school: C. K. McClatchy (Sacramento, California)
- College: California
- NFL draft: 1988: 9th round, 232nd overall pick

Career history
- Dallas Cowboys (1988)*; San Diego Chargers (1988); Toronto Argonauts (1989); BC Lions (1990)
- * Offseason or practice squad member only

Career CFL statistics
- Games played: 6

Brian Allen Bedford (born June 29, 1965) is an American former professional football player who was a wide receiver for the Toronto Argonauts and BC Lions in the Canadian Football League (CFL). He played college football for the California Golden Bears.

== Early life ==
Bedford attended C. K. McClatchy High School. He received Bee All-Metro honors at quarterback as a senior. In basketball, he set the national high school record for season field-goal percentage as a senior.

He accepted a football scholarship from the University of California, Berkeley. He was considered a dual-threat at quarterback, with the ability to both pass and run. As a freshman with the Golden Bears, he was a backup behind Gale Gilbert.

As a sophomore, he was a mostly a backup behind Kevin Brown, but still had a chance to start a few games. In the season finale against Stanford, he replaced an ineffective Brown with the team trailing 0-24 at halftime. Bedford led a remarkable third quarter comeback that put the Golden Bears in a position to win the game, but sprained his ankle while celebrating a touchdown, forcing him to miss most of the fourth quarter and having to watch kicker Leland Rix miss a late 30-yard field goal in a 22-24 loss. During the season, he tallied 46-of-103 completions for 627 passing yards, 157 rushing yards, 2 passing touchdowns, 6 rushing touchdowns and 7 interceptions.

As a junior, he was named the starting quarterback. In the season opener, he completed 4-of-16 attempts for 32 yards in a 15-21 loss against Boston College. He was replaced 4 games into the season with true freshman Troy Taylor. Taylor suffered a broken in the tenth game against USC. Brown would be the player chosen to finish the game, but also start in the season finale against Stanford, engineering a 17-11 upset win. Bedford finished with 42-of-93 completions for 488 yards, 3 passing touchdowns and 5 interceptions.

As a senior, he was converted into a wide receiver, leading the team with 39 receptions for 515 yards and 4 receiving touchdowns, while also having 7 carries for 53 yards (7.6-yard average).

== Professional career ==
=== Dallas Cowboys ===
Bedford was selected by the Dallas Cowboys in the ninth round (232nd overall) of the 1988 NFL draft. On June 30, he was traded to the San Diego Chargers in exchange for a draft choice.

=== San Diego Chargers ===
In 1988, he was tried at both wide receiver and tight end during the preseason. He was placed on the injured reserve list with a shoulder injury on August 23. He was waived on August 29, 1989.

=== Toronto Argonauts ===
On September 7, 1989, he was signed by the Toronto Argonauts of the Canadian Football League. He posted 10 receptions for 171 yards and 2 touchdowns. He was released on July 4, 1990.

=== BC Lions ===
On September 19, 1990, he was signed by the BC Lions of the Canadian Football League. He was limited with a right knee injury, registering only 4 receptions for 54 yards.
