= Sam Kennedy (American football) =

American football player (born 1964)

Samuel Edward Kennedy (born July 10, 1964, in San Mateo, California) is a professional in the National Football League. He attended San Jose State University and earned a degree in Industrial Engineering. He would play with the San Francisco 49ers in 1988 and win Super Bowl XXIII. After retirement from American football, Sam began his dirt-track auto racing career and has 5 NASCAR sanction short track championships. Business owner since 1995.
