= Don Reed (American football) =

American football and golf coach

Biographical details
- Born: April 29, 1920
- Died: April 9, 2012 (aged 91)

Coaching career (HC unless noted)
- 1958–1968: Long Beach State

Head coaching record
- Overall: 57–47–2

Donald F. Reed (April 29, 1920 – April 9, 2012) was the second head coach for the Long Beach State 49ers football program. He coached from 1958 to 1968 and compiled an overall record of 57–47–2. He also coached the golf team from 1975 to 1980.

== Head coaching record ==
Year	Team	Overall	Conference	Standing	Bowl/playoffs
Long Beach State 49ers (California Collegiate Athletic Association) (1958–1968)
1958	Long Beach State	2–6–1	1–3–1	5th	
1959	Long Beach State	4–5	2–3	T–4th	
1960	Long Beach State	5–3–1	3–1–1	T–2nd	
1961	Long Beach State	5–5	2–3	5th	
1962	Long Beach State	5–5	2–3	T–3rd	
1963	Long Beach State	5–5	2–2	T–3rd	
1964	Long Beach State	8–2	3–2	3rd	
1965	Long Beach State	9–1	4–1	2nd	
1966	Long Beach State	6–3	3–2	T–2nd	
1967	Long Beach State	5–5	3–2	T–2nd	
1968	Long Beach State	3–7	1–3	T–4th	
Long Beach State:		57–47–2	26–25–2		
Total:		57–47–2			
