= Battle for the Valley =

American college football rivalry

Fresno State–San Jose State football rivalry
- Fresno State Bulldogs San Jose State Spartans
- First meeting: November 19, 1921; San Jose State, 14–2
- Latest meeting: September 19, 2026; Fresno State, 26–10
- Next meeting: September 29, 2029
- Trophy: Valley Trophy (2013–present)

Statistics
- Total meetings: 89
- All-time series: Fresno State leads, 47–39–3
- Trophy series: Fresno State, 8–5
- Largest victory: Fresno State, 63–12 (1999)
- Longest win streak: Fresno State, 12 (1991–2005)
- Current win streak: Fresno State, 3 (2024–present)

Locations of Fresno State and San Jose State

The Fresno State–San Jose State football rivalry, also known as the Battle for the Valley is a college football rivalry between the Fresno State Bulldogs football team of California State University, Fresno and the San Jose State Spartans football team of San José State University. From 2013 to 2025, the two teams played annual contests as Mountain West Conference opponents. In 2026, the rivalry became a non-conference match-up.

The rivalry is rooted in the two schools' relatively close proximity to one another in the state of California. The city of Fresno is located approximately 150 miles southeast of San Jose. San Jose State is the founding campus of the California State University system, of which Fresno State is also a member.

Additionally, Fresno State and San Jose State are both located in geographical valleys. Fresno is located in the agricultural San Joaquin Valley while San Jose is located in the Santa Clara Valley, which is now more widely known as Silicon Valley. The locations of the two schools account for the names Valley Cup, Valley Bowl and the Battle for the Valley.

As of 2026, Fresno State leads the series 47–39–3.

== Historical overview ==
The Bulldogs and Spartans first played each other in 1921, which San Jose State won 14–2. San Jose State led the series from 1949 to 2001, but Fresno State tied it at 32–32–3 with a victory in 2002 and recaptured the lead in 2003. Beginning in 2013, the winner of the game is awarded the Valley Trophy. The trophy features a silver letter V, with an electrical transistor pattern down one side, and a grape vine pattern down the other, representing each school's representative geographic region.

=== Conference match-up status ===
The rivalry has frequently alternated between period of it being a conference match-up and a non-conference match-up. Since 1921, Fresno State and San Jose State have shared conference affiliation in numerous athletics conferences including the California Coast Conference, Far Western Conference, California Collegiate Athletic Association, Big West Conference, and the Western Athletic Conference.

The rivalry took a one-year break in 2012 after conference realignment temporarily separated the two schools, with Fresno State moving to the Mountain West Conference while San Jose State stayed in the Western Athletic Conference. It resumed as a conference rivalry in 2013 when San Jose State joined the Mountain West, and again ended as a conference match-up when Fresno State joined the Pac-12 Conference. The schools reached a contract to extend their series past 2025, now as a non-conference match-up.

=== Notable games ===
==== 1986 ====
On October 4, 1986, the No. 19 Fresno State Bulldogs, riding a nation‑leading 11‑game winning streak, traveled to San Jose State for the Spartans’ homecoming. A crowd of 28,158 packed Spartan Stadium, the largest in the venue’s history to that point.

The contest marked the Pacific Coast Athletic Association opener for both teams. San Jose State jumped out to a commanding 24–0 first-half lead, but Fresno State rallied to tie the game and take the lead twice in the second half. Bulldogs quarterback Kevin Sweeney connected with wide receiver Stephen Baker three times for long gains of 30, 45, and 84 yards. A 49-yard Barry Belli field goal extended Fresno State's lead to 41–31 with 1:15 remaining, prompting much of the crowd to leave.

Spartan quarterback Mike Perez then drove San Jose State 63 yards on five plays, aided by a Fresno State penalty for too many men on the field, finishing with a 6-yard touchdown pass to Guy Liggins. Sergio Olivarez converted the point after to cut the Spartans' deficit to 41–38 with 42 seconds remaining.

San Jose State then executed an onside kick, with Freddie Payton dislodging the ball, which Chris Alexander recovered at the Fresno State 48-yard line with 39 seconds left. After an incomplete pass, Perez hit Lafo Malauulu for a first down at the 22. On the next play, Perez escaped the grasp of Bulldog defensive lineman Jethro Franklin and threw to Malauulu in the left corner of the end zone for the touchdown with 18 seconds remaining, which San Jose State rode to a 45–41 victory.

Perez finished 33-of-53 passing for 433 yards and five touchdowns. Liggins caught 15 passes for a school-record 203 yards and two touchdowns, while tailback Kenny Jackson rushed 25 times for 103 yards and a touchdown. San Jose State totaled 555 yards of offense on the day. The Spartans also set an NCAA record with 24 penalties for 199 yards.

The victory snapped Fresno State's 11-game winning streak and moved San Jose State to 3–2 overall, making them the favorite in the PCAA. The Spartans ended the regular season ended the season 9–2, winning the PCAA championship, before winning the 1986 California Bowl against the Miami Redskins, 37–7. Fresno State fell to 3–1, and ended the season 9–2.

The game was later named the 1986 Sports Illustrated NCAA Game of the Year.

==== 2013 ====
On November 29, 2013, the San Jose State Spartans hosted the No. 16 Fresno State Bulldogs in a Mountain West Conference matchup that served as the regular-season finale for both teams. The Bulldogs entered the game with an unblemished 10–0 record and aspirations of securing a BCS bowl berth; the Spartans, at 5–6, needed a victory to become bowl eligible. Additionally, the 2013 game was the first game played for the newly introduced Valley Trophy.

After the first quarter, the Fresno State lead with 27–21. In the second quarter, Spartan quarterback David Fales capped a late drive with a 19-yard touchdown pass to Chandler Jones with 50 seconds remaining in the half, giving San Jose State a 42–41 lead. Both Fales and Bulldogs quarterback Derek Carr had thrown six touchdown passes by halftime, combining for more than 800 passing yards in the first half of the game.

To open the second half, San Jose State head coach Ron Caragher, drawing on a suggestion from assistant coach Terry Malley, a 14-year coach of the arena football team the San Jose SaberCats, called for an onside kick. Kicker Harrison Waid recovered his own attempt, and tailback Thomas Tucker capped the ensuing drive with a 7-yard touchdown run.

San Jose State held Fresno State to a field goal on the next possession, then extended its lead further when Fales scored on a 1-yard keeper. The Spartans' defense then delivered a blow when linebacker Keith Smith intercepted an underthrown pass from Carr, breaking the Bulldogs quarterback's streak of 305 consecutive passes without an interception. A subsequent Austin Lopez field goal pushed the San Jose State lead to 62–44. Fresno State scored a late touchdown with two minutes remaining, but the Spartans recovered the ensuing onside kick and ran out the clock to secure a 62–52 victory.

Fales finished 37-of-45 for a single-game school-record 547 yards and six touchdowns, while Carr completed 38-of-50 passes for 519 yards, six scores, and one interception. Jones led San Jose State's receivers with eight catches for 146 yards and three touchdowns; freshman Tyler Winston added 10 receptions for 164 yards and a score. For Fresno State, Davante Adams hauled in 13 passes for 264 yards and three touchdowns. The two teams combined for 1,382 yards of total offense and 63 first downs. San Jose State held the time-of-possession advantage, controlling the ball for 39:23 to Fresno State's 20:37.

The victory gave San Jose State bowl eligibility and marked the program's first win over a ranked opponent since defeating the No. 9 TCU Horned Frogs in 2000. The Spartans ended the season 6–6, and placed 4th in the West Division of the Mountain West Conference. Despite their victory earning them bowl eligibility, they were not selected to play in a bowl game.

For Fresno State, the loss ended both its undefeated season and its hopes of reaching a BCS bowl game. The Bulldogs ended the regular season 10–1, and placed 1st in the West Division of the Mountain West Conference. They went on to beat the No. 24 Utah State Aggies 24–17 in the Mountain West Championship game, before losing to the No.21 USC Trojans in the 2013 Las Vegas Bowl, 45–20.

== Statistics ==
	Fresno State	San Jose State
Games played	89	
Wins	47	39
Ties	3	
Home wins	23	22
Road wins	24	17
Consecutive wins	12	7
Most total points in a game	114	
Most points in a win	63 (1999)	65 (1981)
Most points in a loss	52 (2013)	30 (1989)
Fewest total points in a game	0	
Largest margin of victory	51 (1999)	42 (1958)
Smallest margin of victory	1 (1947, 1989)	1 (1984, 2019)
Total points scored in series	1,994	1,908
Shutouts of opposing team	4 (1926, 1931, 1942, 2007)	2 (1933, 1954)

== Game results ==
Fresno State victories	San Jose State victories	Tie games

No.	Date	Location	Winner	Score
1	November 18, 1921	Fresno, CA	San Jose State	14–2
2	October 24, 1925	San Jose, CA	Fresno State	23–7
3	November 6, 1926	San Jose, CA	Fresno State	34–0
4	November 5, 1927	San Jose, CA	Fresno State	10–7
5	November 16, 1929	Fresno, CA	San Jose State	26–14
6	November 15, 1930	San Jose, CA	Fresno State	27–12
7	October 17, 1931	San Jose, CA	Fresno State	32–0
8	October 21, 1932	San Jose, CA	Tie	0–0
9	November 18, 1933	San Jose, CA	San Jose State	18–0
10	November 3, 1934	San Jose, CA	Tie	7–7
11	November 24, 1939	San Jose, CA	San Jose State	42–7
12	November 16, 1940	Fresno, CA	San Jose State	14–7
13	November 15, 1941	San Jose, CA	Tie	0–0
14	November 26, 1942	Fresno, CA	Fresno State	6–0
15	November 22, 1946	San Jose, CA	San Jose State	13–2
16	November 27, 1947	San Jose, CA	Fresno State	21–20
17	November 19, 1948	San Jose, CA	San Jose State	41–6
18	November 24, 1949	Fresno, CA	San Jose State	43–7
19	November 3, 1950	San Jose, CA	San Jose State	33–7
20	October 6, 1951	Fresno, CA	San Jose State	32–6
21	October 10, 1952	San Jose, CA	San Jose State	40–6
22	October 3, 1953	Fresno, CA	San Jose State	27–21
23	November 19, 1954	San Jose, CA	San Jose State	28–0
24	November 18, 1955	Fresno, CA	Fresno State	19–13
25	November 22, 1956	San Jose, CA	Fresno State	30–14
26	November 16, 1957	Fresno, CA	Fresno State	13–6
27	November 15, 1958	San Jose, CA	San Jose State	48–6
28	October 17, 1959	Fresno, CA	San Jose State	40–14
29	November 11, 1960	San Jose, CA	Fresno State	27–12
30	November 18, 1961	Fresno, CA	Fresno State	36–27
31	November 10, 1962	San Jose, CA	Fresno State	20–14
32	November 16, 1963	San Jose, CA	San Jose State	56–27
33	November 21, 1964	San Jose, CA	San Jose State	26–14
34	November 20, 1965	Fresno, CA	Fresno State	24–18
35	November 19, 1966	San Jose, CA	Fresno State	15–13
36	November 18, 1967	Fresno, CA	San Jose State	35–30
37	September 28, 1968	San Jose, CA	San Jose State	25–21
38	November 21, 1970	San Jose, CA	Fresno State	27–19
39	September 18, 1971	Fresno, CA	Fresno State	14–7
40	September 30, 1972	San Jose, CA	Fresno State	23–21
41	September 15, 1973	Fresno, CA	San Jose State	24–6
42	September 14, 1974	San Jose, CA	San Jose State	28–7
43	November 1, 1975	Fresno, CA	San Jose State	21–7
44	October 23, 1976	San Jose, CA	San Jose State	21–7
45	October 22, 1977	Fresno, CA	Fresno State	45–24

No.	Date	Location	Winner	Score
46	October 21, 1978	San Jose, CA	San Jose State	26–16
47	October 13, 1979	Fresno, CA	San Jose State	35–22
48	October 11, 1980	San Jose, CA	San Jose State	26–14
49	October 3, 1981	Fresno, CA	San Jose State	65–33
50	October 23, 1982	San Jose, CA	Fresno State	39–27
51	October 8, 1983	Fresno, CA	San Jose State	41–23
52	October 27, 1984	San Jose, CA	San Jose State	18–17
53	October 12, 1985	Fresno, CA	Fresno State	37–17
54	October 4, 1986	San Jose, CA	San Jose State	45–41
55	October 17, 1987	Fresno, CA	San Jose State	20–16
56	October 29, 1988	San Jose, CA	Fresno State	17–15
57	November 4, 1989	Fresno, CA	#25 Fresno State	31–30
58	November 17, 1990	San Jose, CA	San Jose State	42–7
59	November 23, 1991	Fresno, CA	Fresno State	31–28
60	September 3, 1994	Fresno, CA	Fresno State	45–13
61	October 12, 1996	Fresno, CA	Fresno State	28–18
62	November 1, 1997	San Jose, CA	Fresno State	53–12
63	November 21, 1998	Fresno, CA	Fresno State	24–21
64	November 20, 1999	Fresno, CA	Fresno State	63–12
65	November 25, 2000	San Jose, CA	Fresno State	37–6
66	November 23, 2001	Fresno, CA	#23 Fresno State	40–21
67	November 23, 2002	San Jose, CA	Fresno State	19–16
68	November 15, 2003	Fresno, CA	Fresno State	41–7
69	November 27, 2004	San Jose, CA	Fresno State	62–28
70	November 5, 2005	Fresno, CA	#21 Fresno State	45–7
71	December 2, 2006	San Jose, CA	San Jose State	24–14
72	October 20, 2007	Fresno, CA	Fresno State	30–0
73	November 21, 2008	San Jose, CA	Fresno State	24–10
74	October 17, 2009	Fresno, CA	Fresno State	41–21
75	October 23, 2010	San Jose, CA	Fresno State	33–18
76	November 26, 2011	Fresno, CA	San Jose State	27–24
77	November 29, 2013	San Jose, CA	San Jose State	62–52
78	November 8, 2014	Fresno, CA	Fresno State	38–24
79	September 26, 2015	San Jose, CA	San Jose State	49–23
80	November 26, 2016	Fresno, CA	San Jose State	16–14
81	October 7, 2017	San Jose, CA	Fresno State	27–10
82	November 24, 2018	Fresno, CA	Fresno State	31–13
83	November 30, 2019	San Jose, CA	San Jose State	17–16
84	November 25, 2021	San Jose, CA	Fresno State	40–9
85	October 15, 2022	Fresno, CA	Fresno State	17–10
86	November 11, 2023	San Jose, CA	San Jose State	42–18
87	October 26, 2024	Fresno, CA	Fresno State	33–10
88	November 29, 2025	San Jose, CA	Fresno State	41–14
89	September 19, 2026	San Jose, CA	Fresno State	26–10
Series: Fresno State leads 47–39–3

== See also ==
- List of NCAA college football rivalry games
