= Jim Stangeland =

American football player and coach (1921–2014)

Biographical details
- Born: December 21, 1921; Los Angeles, California, U.S.
- Died: October 25, 2014 (aged 92); Long Beach, California, U.S.

Playing career
- 1942: USC
- 1947: Arizona State
- Position: End

Coaching career (HC unless noted)
- 1950–1953: North HS (AZ)
- 1954–1955: Downey HS (CA)
- 1956: Orange Coast (assistant)
- 1957–1964: Long Beach
- 1965–1968: USC (assistant)
- 1969–1973: Long Beach State

Head coaching record
- Overall: 31–24–2 (college); 58–15–2 (junior college)
- Bowls: 0–0–1 (college); 4–0 (junior college)

Accomplishments and honors

Championships
- 1 junior college national (1964); 4 Metropolitan Conference (1960, 1962–1964); 2 PCAA (1970–1971)

Jim Stangeland (December 21, 1921 – October 25, 2014) was an American football player and coach. He served as the head coach at California State University, Long Beach from 1969 to 1973, where he compiled a record of 31–24–2, including back-to-back Pacific Coast Athletic Association championships (1970–1971) and an appearance in the Pasadena Bowl in 1970.

As an athlete, Strangeland competed for the USC Trojans and the Arizona State Sun Devils in both football and track. He was a four-time Border Conference winner in the pole vault.

== Head coaching record ==
=== College ===
Year	Team	Overall	Conference	Standing	Bowl/playoffs
Long Beach State 49ers (Pacific Coast Athletic Association) (1969–1973)
1969	Long Beach State	8–3	3–1	2nd	
1970	Long Beach State	9–2–1	5–1	T–1st	T Pasadena
1971	Long Beach State	8–4	5–1	1st	
1972	Long Beach State	5–6	1–3	T–3rd	
1973	Long Beach State	1–9–1	0–4	5th	
Long Beach State:		31–24–2	14–10		
Total:		31–24–2			
National championship Conference title Conference division title or championship game berth

=== Junior college ===
Year	Team	Overall	Conference	Standing	Bowl/playoffs
Long Beach Vikings (Metropolitan Conference) (1957–1964)
1957	Long Beach	5–3–1	4–2–1	3rd	
1958	Long Beach	6–3	4–2	3rd	
1959	Long Beach	4–5	3–4	T–5th	
1960	Long Beach	10–0	7–0	1st	W Junior Rose Bowl
1961	Long Beach	7–2	5–2	3rd	
1962	Long Beach	9–0–1	6–0–1	1st	W Potato Bowl
1963	Long Beach	7–2	6–1	T–1st	W Elks Bowl
1964	Long Beach	10–0	6–0	1st	W Junior Rose Bowl
Long Beach:		58–15–2	41–11–2		
Total:		58–15–2			
National championship Conference title Conference division title or championship game berth
