= Larry Reisbig =

American football player and coach

Biographical details
- Born: December 6, 1939
- Died: April 10, 2017 (aged 77); Newport Beach, California, U.S.

Playing career

Football
- 1958–1959: Pierce
- 1961–1962: Washington State
- Positions: End, tackle

Coaching career (HC unless noted)

Football
- 1963–1964: Sandy HS (OR)
- 1965–1967: William S. Hart HS (CA) (backfield/ends)
- 1968–1969: Canyon HS (CA)
- 1970–1972: College of the Canyons (DB)
- 1973–1981: College of the Canyons
- 1982–1984: Pasadena
- 1985–1986: Long Beach State (RB)
- 1987–1989: Long Beach State
- 1991–1992: Orange Coast (DB)
- 1992–2002: Long Beach

Track
- 1965–1968: William S. Hart HS (CA)
- 1969–1970: Canyon HS (CA)

Wrestling
- 1963–1965: Sandy HS (OR)
- 1971–1973: College of the Canyons

Administrative career (AD unless noted)
- 2003–2010: Long Beach

Head coaching record
- Overall: 11–24 (college football); 164–84–2 (junior college); 22–14 (high school football); 28–1 (high school track); 8–4 (college wrestling)
- Tournaments: Football; 0–1 (California JC large division playoffs)

Accomplishments and honors

Championships
- Football; 1 junior college national (1995); 2 WSC (1973, 1975); 7 Mission Conference North Division (1993–1996, 1998, 2002)

Larry Reisbig (December 6, 1939 – April 10, 2017) was an American football coach and college athletic administrator. He served as the head football coach at California State University, Long Beach (Long Beach State) from 1987 to 1989, compiling a record of 11–24. Reisbig was the head football coach at College of the Canyons in Santa Clarita, California from 1973 to 1981, Pasadena City College from 1982 to 1984, and Long Beach City College (PBCC) and 1992 to 2002. He led his 1995 Long Beach team to a junior college national championship. Reisberg was also the athletic director at LBCC from 2003 to 2010.

== Early life and playing career ==
Reisbig was born on December 6, 1939. A native of Los Angeles, he played high school football at Van Nuys High School before graduating in 1957. Reisbig played junior college football at Los Angeles Pierce College in 1958 and 1958, earning all-Western State Conference (WSC) and All-American honors. He then played college football at Washington State University from 1961 to 1962 under head coach Jim Sutherland.

== Coaching career ==
After graduating from Washington State in 1963, Reisig began his coaching career that fall when he was hired as the head football coach at Sandy High School in Sandy, Oregon. He led his football teams at Sandy to a record of 11–7 in two seasons, and was also an assistant wrestling coach at the school. After two years at Sandy, Reisig returned to Southern California to serve as head track coach and assistant football coach at William S. Hart High School in the Newhall neighborhood of Santa Clarita. In 1968, he moved to Canyon High School, also in Santa Clarita, as head football coach, and added duties aw head track coach the following year. His football teams at Canyon had a record of 11–7 in two seasons.

In 1970, Reisig joined the football coaching staff at the College of the Canyons for the program's inaugural season. He was promoted to head coach in 1973 and compiled a record of 51–38 over nine seasons before the program folded in 1981. Reisebig then worked as the head football coach at Pasadena City College for three years. He joined the Long Beach State 49ers football program in 1985 as an assistant under Mike Sheppard, who he succeeded after two seasons.

Reisebig was the defensive backs coach at Orange Coast College from 1990 to 1991 and head football coach at Long Beach City College from 1992 to 2002.

== Death ==
Reisbig died on April 10, 2017, at the age of 77.

== Head coaching record ==
=== College football ===
Year	Team	Overall	Conference	Standing	Bowl/playoffs
Long Beach State 49ers (Pacific Coast Athletic Association / Big West Conference) (1987–1989)
1987	Long Beach State	4–7	2–5	7th	
1988	Long Beach State	3–9	3–4	T–5th	
1989	Long Beach State	4–8	2–5	T–6th	
Long Beach State:		11–24	7–14		
Total:		11–24			

=== Junior college football ===
Year	Team	Overall	Conference	Standing	Bowl/playoffs
College of the Canyons Cougars (Western State Conference) (1973–1981)
1973	College of the Canyons	8–3	6–1	T–1st	L California JC large division quarterfinal
1974	College of the Canyons	6–4	4–3	T–4th	
1975	College of the Canyons	6–4–1	6–1	T–1st	T Mission Bowl
1976	College of the Canyons	2–7	1–6	8th	
1977	College of the Canyons	6–4	5–2	T–2nd	
1978	College of the Canyons	7–3	5–2	T–2nd	
1979	College of the Canyons	4–6	3–4	T–4th	
1980	College of the Canyons	6–4	4–4	5th	
1981	College of the Canyons	6–4	4–2	3rd	
College of the Canyons:		51–39–1	38–25		
Pasadena Lancers (Metropolitan Conference) (1982–1983)
1982	Pasadena	8–2	4–2	2nd	
1983	Pasadena	6–3	3–2	T–2nd	
Pasadena Lancers (Pac-9 Conference) (1984)
1984	Pasadena	7–4	6–2	3rd	W Citrus Bowl
Pasadena:		21–9	13–6		
Long Beach Vikings (Mission Conference) (1992–2002)
1992	Long Beach	4–5–1	4–4–1 / 1–3	T–4th (North)	
1993	Long Beach	9–2	3–1	T–1st (North)	L Dairy Bowl
1994	Long Beach	9–2	6–0	1st (North)	L Potato Bowl
1995	Long Beach	11–0	10–0 / 6–0	1st (North)	W Strawberry Bowl
1996	Long Beach	8–3	8–2 / 4–1	T–1st (North)	L Potato Bowl
1997	Long Beach	9–2	8–2 / 3–2	3rd (North)	W Orange Country Bowl
1998	Long Beach	10–1	10–0 / 5–0	1st (North)	L First Down Bowl
1999	Long Beach	4–6	4–6 / 1–4	5th (North)	
2000	Long Beach	4–6	4–6 / 2–3	T–3rd (North)	
2001	Long Beach	6–5	4–4 / 3–2	2nd (North)	L CHPs For Kids Bowl
2002	Long Beach	8–3	5–3 / 4–1	1st (North)	W Western State Bowl
Long Beach:		92–36–1	66–28–1		
Total:		164–84–2			
National championship Conference title Conference division title or championship game berth
