= Carl Ferrill =

American football coach (born c. 1969)

Biographical details
- Born: c. 1946; Albuquerque, New Mexico, U.S.
- Died: June 30, 2024 (aged 77–78); Boise, Idaho, U.S.

Playing career

Football
- 1965–1968: New Mexico Highlands

Baseball
- 1966–1969: New Mexico Highlands
- Positions: Wide receiver (football); Third baseman (baseball)

Coaching career (HC unless noted)

Football
- 1970–1977: Baldwin Park HS (CA) (DC/QB/WR)
- 1978–1981: Santa Ana (OC)
- 1982: West Hills Coalinga
- 1983: Idaho (DB/RC)
- 1984–1986: UNLV (AHC/RC)
- 1987–1989: UNLV (AHC/OC/RC)
- 1991–1993: San Bernardino Valley (AHC/OC)
- 1994–1995: Chaffey
- 1996–1998: New Mexico Highlands
- 1999–2000: Los Angeles Valley
- 2006: New Mexico Highlands

Administrative career (AD unless noted)
- 1970–1977: Baldwin Park HS (CA)
- 1982: West Hills Coalinga

Head coaching record
- Overall: 30–14 (college); 28–24 (junior college)
- Bowls: 1–1

Accomplishments and honors

Championships
- 1 Central Valley (1982)

Awards
- New Mexico Highlands Hall of Fame (2006); RMAC co-Coach of the Year (1996)

Carl Ray "Coach" Ferrill (c. 1946 – June 30, 2024) was an American college football coach. He was the head football coach for West Hills Coalinga College—now known as Coalinga College—in 1982, Chaffey College from 1994 to 1995, New Mexico Highlands University from 1996 to 1998 and in 2006, and Los Angeles Valley College from 1999 to 2000. He also coached for Baldwin Park High School, Santa Ana, Idaho, UNLV, and San Bernardino Valley. He played college football for New Mexico Highlands as a wide receiver.

Ferrill also played semi-professionally in the Continental Football League (COFL).

== Head coaching record ==
=== College ===
Year	Team	Overall	Conference	Standing	Bowl/playoffs
New Mexico Highlands Cowboys (Rocky Mountain Athletic Conference) (1996–1998)
1996	New Mexico Highlands	8–3	5–3	T–3rd	
1997	New Mexico Highlands	8–3	6–2	T–2nd	
1998	New Mexico Highlands	8–3	6–2	3rd	
New Mexico Highlands Cowboys (Rocky Mountain Athletic Conference) (2006)
2006	New Mexico Highlands	6–5	3–5	T–5th	
New Mexico Highlands:		30–14	20–12		
Total:		30–14			

=== Junior college ===
Year	Team	Overall	Conference	Standing	Bowl/playoffs	CCCAA^{#}
West Hills Coalinga Falcons (Central Valley Conference) (1982)
1982	West Hills Coalinga	7–4	4–2	T–1st	L Silicon Valley Bowl	
West Hills Coalinga:		7–4	4–2			
Chaffey Panthers (Foothill Conference) (1994–1995)
1994	Chaffey	7–3	5–3	4th		
1995	Chaffey	7–4	6–2	T–3rd	W Upland Ford Bowl	14 (Southern)
Chaffey:		14–7	11–5			
Los Angeles Valley Monarchs (Western State Conference) (1999–2000)
1999	Los Angeles Valley	5–5	3–4	5th (Northern)		
2000	Los Angeles Valley	2–8	2–5	T–6th (Northern)		13 (Southern)
Los Angeles Valley:		7–13	5–9			
Total:		28–24				
National championship Conference title Conference division title or championship game berth
