= Long Beach State 49ers football =

Defunct American college football team

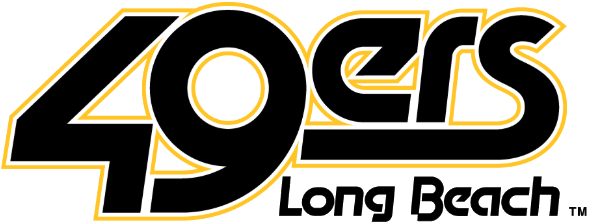
- First season: 1955
- Last season: 1991; 35 years ago
- Location: Long Beach, California
- Stadium: Veterans Memorial Stadium; Angel Stadium of Anaheim (capacity: 11,600 / 69,008)
- Conference: Big West Conference
- Colors: Black and gold
- All-time record: 199–183–4 (.521)
- Bowl record: 0–0–1 (.500)

Conference championships
- 3

The Long Beach State 49ers football team represented California State University, Long Beach from the 1955 through 1991 seasons. The 49ers originally competed as an Independent before joining the California Collegiate Athletic Association in 1958. By the 1969 season, the 49ers joined the Pacific Coast Athletic Association (now the Big West) as a founding member, where they remained until the program was suspended following the 1991 season.

Long Beach played its home games at multiple stadiums throughout their history with the most recent being Veterans Memorial Stadium, in Long Beach, California. During their 37 years of competition, the 49ers compiled an all-time record of 199 wins, 183 losses and 4 ties.

Three members of the Pro Football Hall of Fame were associated with the program during its last two years of existence: coaches George Allen and Willie Brown, as well as running back Terrell Davis.

== History ==
The Long Beach State football team traces its roots to 1955 when, looking to capitalize on the boosters for both USC and UCLA residing in Long Beach, the 49ers program was established. The program would see modest success, culminating with conference titles following both the 1970 and 1971 seasons, including the 49ers' lone bowl, the 1970 Pasadena Bowl.

Between the 1977 and 1982 seasons, Long Beach played the majority of their home games at Anaheim Stadium prior to moving back to Veterans Memorial Stadium for the 1983 season. The 49ers would again win the PCAA championship following the 1980 season.

Before the 1990 season, the legendary George Allen came out of retirement to coach the 49ers. Allen led the team to an undefeated home schedule, although the overall won-loss record was 6-5. He recruited another future member of the Pro Football Hall of Fame, a running back from San Diego Lincoln High named Terrell Davis. Allen died on December 31, 1990, leaving the future of the program in doubt. The program continued for one more season, under rookie head coach Willie Brown, a former NFL star who like Allen and Davis is now a member of the Pro Football Hall of Fame. The team went 2-9 in its last season. On December 10, 1991, university president Curtis McCray announced the 49ers football program would be disbanded immediately. The decision to disband the football team was prompted by financial shortfalls resulting from California's budget crisis, coupled with increased costs of operating the program and declining fan support.

Although the 49ers have not played a game since 1991, Long Beach is still the NCAA record-holder in several categories. These records include: the most passes caught by a running back for both a single game and season with 18 and 99, respectively, by Mark Templeton, during the 1986 season, and leading the nation in total offense with an average of 326.8 yards per game for the 1982 season. The 49ers also led the nation in total offense with 529 yards per game while members of the college division in 1965.

== Conference championships ==
Long Beach won three conference championships during their tenure as a program, two outright and one shared.

Season	Conference	Coach	Overall Record	Conference Record
1970†	Pacific Coast Athletic Association	Jim Stangeland	9–2–1	5–1
1971	Pacific Coast Athletic Association	Jim Stangeland	8–4	5–1
1980	Pacific Coast Athletic Association	Dave Currey	8–3	5–0

† Co-champion

== Recovery of game films ==
As many as 150 Long Beach State football games of full and partial game film have been located and are stored in Los Angeles. The majority of the games are on 16mm film, while some of the later games are on U-matic and Betamax format tapes. Many of the games have been transferred to digital video and are listed on the Long Beach State 49ers Football Game Film Archive website. The story of the discovery and preservation of the game film was documented in the April 2015 issue of DIG Magazine in an article titled "Salvaged Memories".

== Bring back 49er football effort ==
Student efforts to revive a Division I-AA level football program (today known as NCAA Division I-FCS) began in April 2008 and led to a referendum in March 2011. The referendum took place from March 21 to March 24 online, with only current CSULB students able to cast a vote. Overall, 3,084 people voted, with 52% of the student body voting "no" and 48% voting "yes".

== Head coaches ==
Long Beach had 9 head coaches through 36 years of play, with a total record of 199–183–4 (.520).

Tenure	Coach	Seasons	Record	Pct.
1955–1957	Mike DeLotto	3	13–10	.565
1958–1968	Don Reed	11	57–47–2	.547
1969–1973	Jim Stangeland	5	31–24–2	.561
1974–1976	Wayne Howard	3	23–10	.697
1977–1983	Dave Currey	7	40–36	.526
1984–1986	Mike Sheppard	3	16–18	.471
1987–1989	Larry Reisbig	3	11–24	.314
1990	George Allen	1	6–5	.545
1991	Willie Brown	1	2–9	.182

== National award winners ==
Corbett Award
Year	Name	Position
2007	Fred L. Miller	Athletic director

== All-Americans ==
- Leon Burns, RB- 1970 (NEA-1st; PFW-1st)
- Herman Parker, DT- 1979 (AP 3rd)
- John Hendy, DB- 1984 (AP All American; PFW-1st)

== Seasons ==
Conference champions *	Bowl game berth ^

Season	Head coach	Conference	Season results				Bowl result
Season	Head coach	Conference	Conference finish	Wins	Losses	Ties	Bowl result
Long Beach State 49ers
1955	Mike DeLotto	Independent	—	5	2	0	—
1956	Mike DeLotto	California Collegiate Athletic Association	—	5	3	0	—
1957	Mike DeLotto	California Collegiate Athletic Association	—	3	5	0	—
1958	Don Reed	California Collegiate Athletic Association	—	2	6	1	—
1959	Don Reed	California Collegiate Athletic Association	—	4	5	0	—
1960	Don Reed	California Collegiate Athletic Association	—	5	3	1	—
1961	Don Reed	California Collegiate Athletic Association	—	5	5	0	—
1962	Don Reed	California Collegiate Athletic Association	—	5	5	0	—
1963	Don Reed	California Collegiate Athletic Association	—	5	5	0	—
1964	Don Reed	California Collegiate Athletic Association	—	8	2	0	—
1965	Don Reed	California Collegiate Athletic Association	—	9	1	0	—
1966	Don Reed	California Collegiate Athletic Association	—	6	3	0	—
1967	Don Reed	California Collegiate Athletic Association	—	5	5	0	—
1968	Don Reed	California Collegiate Athletic Association	—	3	7	0	—
1969	Jim Stangeland	Pacific Coast Athletic Association	—	8	3	0	—
1970 *	Jim Stangeland	Pacific Coast Athletic Association	—	9	2	1	Tie 1970 Pasadena Bowl against Louisville Cardinals, 24–24 ^
1971 *	Jim Stangeland	Pacific Coast Athletic Association	—	8	4	0	—
1972	Jim Stangeland	Pacific Coast Athletic Association	—	5	6	0	—
1973	Jim Stangeland	Pacific Coast Athletic Association	—	1	9	1	—
1974	Wayne Howard	Pacific Coast Athletic Association	—	6	5	0	—
1975	Wayne Howard	Pacific Coast Athletic Association	—	9	2	0	—
1976	Wayne Howard	Pacific Coast Athletic Association	—	8	3	0	—
1977	Dave Currey	Pacific Coast Athletic Association	—	4	6	0	—
1978	Dave Currey	Pacific Coast Athletic Association	—	5	6	0	—
1979	Dave Currey	Pacific Coast Athletic Association	—	7	4	0	—
1980 *	Dave Currey	Pacific Coast Athletic Association	—	8	3	0	—
1981	Dave Currey	Pacific Coast Athletic Association	—	2	8	0	—
1982	Dave Currey	Pacific Coast Athletic Association	—	6	5	0	—
1983	Dave Currey	Pacific Coast Athletic Association	—	8	4	0	—
1984	Mike Sheppard	Pacific Coast Athletic Association	T-4th of 8	4	7	0	Record adjusted to 5-6 overall due to NCAA sanctions on UNLV.
1985	Mike Sheppard	Pacific Coast Athletic Association	4th of 8	6	6	0	—
1986	Mike Sheppard	Pacific Coast Athletic Association	3rd of 8	6	5	0	—
1987	Larry Reisbig	Pacific Coast Athletic Association	7th of 8	4	7	0	—
1988	Larry Reisbig	Big West Conference	T-5th of 8	3	9	0	—
1989	Larry Reisbig	Big West Conference	T-6th of 8	4	8	0	—
1990	George Allen	Big West Conference	4th of 8	6	5	0	—
1991	Willie Brown	Big West Conference	T-5th of 8	2	9	0	—
Total				198	183	4	(only includes regular season games)
Total				0	0	1	(only includes bowl games)
Total				199	183	4	(all games)
