= Dave Currey (American football) =

American football player, coach, and administrator (1943–2023)

Biographical details
- Born: May 13, 1943
- Died: July 15, 2023 (aged 80)

Playing career
- 1963: Howard (AL)
- Position: Running back

Coaching career (HC unless noted)
- 1967–1969: St. Bonaventure HS (CA)
- 1970–1976: Stanford (assistant)
- 1977–1983: Long Beach State
- 1984–1988: Cincinnati
- 1989: UCLA (assistant)

Administrative career (AD unless noted)
- 1984: Cincinnati
- 1990–2015: Chapman

Head coaching record
- Overall: 59–72 (college); 26–6 (high school)

Accomplishments and honors

Championships
- 1 PCAA (1980)

David Currey (May 13, 1943 – July 15, 2023) was an American college athletics administrator and college football player and coach. He was the former athletic director at Chapman University, a position he held from 1990 to 2015. From 1977 to 1983, he coached at Long Beach State, where he compiled a 40–36 record. In 1980 and 1983, his teams won eight games. From 1984 to 1988, he served as the head football coach at the University of Cincinnati, where he compiled a 19–36 record. (He also briefly was athletic director in 1984.) His overall record as a coach was 59–72.

Currey died on July 15, 2023, at the age of 80.

== Head coaching record ==
=== College ===
Year	Team	Overall	Conference	Standing	Bowl/playoffs
Long Beach State 49ers (Pacific Coast Athletic Association) (1977–1983)
1977	Long Beach State	4–6	1–3	4th	
1978	Long Beach State	5–6	1–4	T–5th	
1979	Long Beach State	7–4	3–2	3rd	
1980	Long Beach State	8–3	5–0	1st	
1981	Long Beach State	2–8	1–4	T–5th	
1982	Long Beach State	6–5	5–1	2nd	
1983	Long Beach State	8–4	3–3	T–3rd	
Long Beach State:		40–36	19–17		
Cincinnati Bearcats (NCAA Division I-A independent) (1984–1988)
1984	Cincinnati	2–9			
1985	Cincinnati	5–6			
1986	Cincinnati	5–6			
1987	Cincinnati	4–7			
1988	Cincinnati	3–8			
Cincinnati:		19–36			
Total:		59–72			
National championship Conference title Conference division title or championship game berth
