= 1986 California Bowl =

Miami Redskins	San Jose State Spartans
(8–3)	(9–2)
7	37
Head coach: Tim Rose	Head coach: Claude Gilbert
	AP / Coaches; NR / 19
	1	2	3	4	Total
Miami	7	0	0	0	7
San Jose State	3	14	7	13	37
- Date: December 13, 1986
- Season: 1986
- Stadium: Bulldog Stadium
- Location: Fresno, California
- MVP: QB Mike Perez (San Jose State); Andy Marlatt (Miami)
- Attendance: 26,000

The 1986 California Bowl was a college football postseason bowl game that featured the Miami Redskins and the San Jose State Spartans.

== Background ==
Miami was champion of the Mid-American Conference for the first time since 1977. San Jose State was champion of the Pacific Coast Athletic Association for the 5th time in 9 years.

== Game summary ==
Quarterback Mike Perez went 21-of-37 for 291 yards for 3 touchdowns in an MVP effort.

- San Jose State – Olivarez 45 yard field goal
- Miami (Ohio) – Stofa 20 yard touchdown pass from Terry Morris (Gussman kick)
- San Jose State – Saxon 1 yard touchdown run (Olivarez kick)
- San Jose State – Liggins 36 yard touchdown pass from Perez (Olivarez kick)
- San Jose State – Malauulu 4 yard touchdown pass from Perez (Olivarez kick)
- San Jose State – Liggins 31 yard touchdown pass from Perez (Olivarez kick)
- San Jose State – Alexander 39 yard touchdown interception return (kick failed)

== Aftermath ==
Miami would not play in a bowl game again until 2003 while San Jose State went to two more bowl games in the next three years (1987 and 1990) before going on a 16-year bowl drought.

== Statistics ==
Statistics	San Jose State	Miami (Ohio)
First downs	23	22
Passing yards	313	208
Rushing yards	113	24
Total yards	426	232
Passes intercepted	0	5
Penalties–yards	14–163	10–101
Punts–average	4–29.3	5–34.4
Fumbles–lost	6–1	1–1
