= Mike Sheppard (American football) =

American football player and coach (born 1951)

Biographical details
- Born: October 29, 1951 (age 75)

Playing career
- 1969–1972: Cal Lutheran
- Position: Wide receiver

Coaching career (HC unless noted)
- 1974–1976: Cal Lutheran (assistant)
- 1977–1978: BYU (GA)
- 1979: United States International (OC)
- 1980–1981: Idaho State (assistant)
- 1982: Long Beach State (assistant)
- 1983: Kansas (OC)
- 1984–1986: Long Beach State
- 1987–1991: New Mexico
- 1992: California (OC)
- 1993–1995: Cleveland Browns (TE 93, WR)
- 1996: Baltimore Ravens (WR)
- 1997–1998: San Diego Chargers (OC)
- 1999–2000: Seattle Seahawks (QB)
- 2001: Buffalo Bills (OC)
- 2002–2004: New Orleans Saints (QB)
- 2005: New Orleans Saints (OC)
- 2007–2010: Cincinnati Bengals (WR)
- 2011: Jacksonville Jaguars (QB)
- 2012–2013: Jacksonville Jaguars (WR)

Head coaching record
- Overall: 25–68

Mike Sheppard (born October 29, 1951) is an American football coach and former player.

Sheppard was an assistant at Idaho State when it won the NCAA Division I-AA title in 1981. He was a wide receiver for the Cal Lutheran Kingsmen when they won the 1971 NAIA Division II Football National Championship. In the national championship game, Sheppard was named the defensive player of the game.

In 1983 as offensive coordinator at Kansas, he helped guide quarterback Frank Seurer to 2,789 yards and 14 touchdowns. Running backs Kerwin Bell, E. J. Jones, and Robert Mimbs combined to run for 1,295 yards and 9 TD. WR Bob Johnson had 58 catches for 1,154 yards and 7 TD. The team scored over 30 points in five games despite finishing the season at 4–6–1 including a 26–20 win over #10 USC and a 37–27 win over #19 Missouri.

From 1984 to 1987, he served as the head football coach at Long Beach State, where he compiled a 16–18 record through three seasons. In 1984 to 1985, he compiled back-to-back non-losing seasons at 6–6 and 6–5, respectively. From 1987 to 1991, he took the head coaching job at the University of New Mexico, and led the Lobos to a 9–50 record. His best season with New Mexico was a 3–9 season in 1991.

In the spring of 1990, Bob Shoup spent much time at the University of New Mexico, helping Lobo coach Mike Sheppard. He has been described by a New Mexico media guide as “one of the nation’s most innovative and progressive coaching minds.”

As offensive coordinator for one season at California in 1992, he helped guide QB Dave Barr to a season where he threw for 2,343 yards and 19 TD. RB Russell White ran for 1,069 yards and 9 TD. He also guided WR Sean Dawkins to 65 catches for 1,070 yards and 14 TD. Despite going 4–7 on the year, the team scored over 40 points on three occasions.

Sheppard was the offensive coordinator of the San Diego Chargers in 1997 and 1998, the Buffalo Bills in 2001, and the New Orleans Saints in 2005. He was the wide receivers coach of the Cincinnati Bengals from 2007 to 2010.

In February 2011, Sheppard was hired by the Jacksonville Jaguars to replace Mike Shula as quarterbacks coach. He was moved to wide receivers coach on November 30 to replace fired coach Johnny Cox.

== Head coaching record ==
Year	Team	Overall	Conference	Standing	Bowl/playoffs
Long Beach State 49ers (Pacific Coast Athletic Association) (1984–1986)
1984	Long Beach State	4–7	3–4	T–4th	
1985	Long Beach State	6–6	4–3	4th	
1986	Long Beach State	6–5	4–3	3rd	
Long Beach State:		16–18	11–10		
New Mexico Lobos (Western Athletic Conference) (1987–1991)
1987	New Mexico	0–11	0–8	9th	
1988	New Mexico	2–10	1–7	8th	
1989	New Mexico	2–10	0–7	8th	
1990	New Mexico	2–10	1–6	8th	
1991	New Mexico	3–9	2–6	T–8th	
New Mexico:		9–50	4–34		
Total:		25–68			
