= List of San Diego State Aztecs in the NFL draft =

This is a list of San Diego State Aztecs football players in the NFL draft.

== Key ==
B	Back	K	Kicker	NT	Nose tackle
C	Center	LB	Linebacker	FB	Fullback
DB	Defensive back	P	Punter	HB	Halfback
DE	Defensive end	QB	Quarterback	WR	Wide receiver
DT	Defensive tackle	RB	Running back	G	Guard
E	End	T	Offensive tackle	TE	Tight end

== Selections ==
Year	Round	Pick	Overall	Player	Team	Position
1952	4	12	49	Volney Quinlan	Los Angeles Rams	B
1952	21	12	253	Art Preston	Los Angeles Rams	B
1953	17	8	201	Hugh Latham	San Francisco 49ers	T
1953	19	12	229	Paul Held	Detroit Lions	B
1954	4	9	46	Norm Nygaard	Los Angeles Rams	B
1955	17	9	202	Bob Newton	San Francisco 49ers	G
1963	14	5	187	Neal Petties	Baltimore Colts	E
1963	17	5	229	Kern Carson	Baltimore Colts	B
1963	21	1	161	Neal Petties	Oakland Raiders	E
1963	29	5	229	Kern Carson	Denver Broncos	B
1964	11	7	147	John Farris	Los Angeles Rams	T
1964	17	8	136	John Farris	San Diego Chargers	T
1964	20	8	274	John Butler	Baltimore Colts	RB
1964	26	3	203	John Butler	New York Jets	RB
1965	6	7	77	Gary Garrison	Philadelphia Eagles	WR
1965	12	6	94	Jim Allison	San Diego Chargers	RB
1965	16	6	126	John Godden	San Diego Chargers	LB
1965	18	2	240	Leon Standridge	San Francisco 49ers	E
1965	1	6	6	Gary Garrison	San Diego Chargers	E
1965	2	6	14	Larry Martin	San Diego Chargers	T
1965	12	7	95	Leon Standridge	Boston Patriots	E
1966	9	8	80	Clifton Kinney	Oakland Raiders	LB
1966	11	13	168	Ralph Wenzel	Green Bay Packers	G
1966	13	9	117	Houston Ridge	San Diego Chargers	DE
1966	13	10	195	Larry Martin	Minnesota Vikings	T
1966	3	8	26	Jeff Staggs	San Diego Chargers	LB
1966	8	7	70	Ray Schmautz	Oakland Raiders	LB
1967	1	25	25	Don Horn	Green Bay Packers	QB
1967	2	5	31	Leo Carroll	Atlanta Falcons	DE
1967	2	9	35	Don Shy	Pittsburgh Steelers	RB
1967	2	10	36	Bob Jones	Chicago Bears	DB
1967	2	22	48	Bob Howard	San Diego Chargers	DB
1967	6	14	147	Nate Johns	San Diego Chargers	WR
1967	7	15	174	John Williams	Philadelphia Eagles	DB
1967	15	14	381	Craig Scoggins	San Diego Chargers	WR
1968	1	9	9	Haven Moses	Buffalo Bills	WR
1968	5	10	121	Steve Duich	Green Bay Packers	T
1968	12	3	303	John Beck	New Orleans Saints	DB
1968	13	27	354	Teddy Washington	Cincinnati Bengals	RB
1969	1	13	13	Fred Dryer	New York Giants	DE
1969	3	23	75	Lloyd Edwards	Oakland Raiders	TE
1969	7	23	179	Tom Nettles	Kansas City Chiefs	WR
1969	12	4	290	Doug Fisher	Pittsburgh Steelers	LB
1970	2	4	30	Dennis Shaw	Buffalo Bills	QB
1970	4	26	104	Billie Hayes	Cincinnati Bengals	DB
1970	7	10	166	Lon Woodard	New Orleans Saints	DE
1970	12	20	306	Bill Pierson	New York Jets	C
1971	2	7	33	Ken Burrow	Atlanta Falcons	WR
1971	2	24	50	Henry Allison	Philadelphia Eagles	G
1971	5	4	108	Tom Shellabarger	Philadelphia Eagles	T
1971	6	7	137	Tom Hayes	Atlanta Falcons	DB
1971	8	13	195	Leon Van Gorkum	San Diego Chargers	DE
1971	16	7	397	Lindsey James	Atlanta Falcons	RB
1972	1	7	7	Willie Buchanon	Green Bay Packers	DB
1972	2	23	49	Tom Reynolds	New England Patriots	WR
1972	4	6	84	Martin Imhof	St. Louis Cardinals	DT
1972	4	12	90	Robert West	Dallas Cowboys	WR
1972	6	11	141	Bruce Ward	San Diego Chargers	G
1972	13	18	330	Brian Sipe	Cleveland Browns	QB
1972	14	23	361	Marv Owens	Minnesota Vikings	RB
1973	1	15	15	Isaac Curtis	Cincinnati Bengals	WR
1973	4	12	90	Bill Ferguson	New York Jets	LB
1973	6	3	133	Jim Peterson	Los Angeles Rams	DE
1973	12	2	288	Joe Lavender	Philadelphia Eagles	DB
1974	3	16	68	Claudie Minor	Denver Broncos	T
1974	6	3	133	Jesse Freitas	San Diego Chargers	QB
1975	2	2	28	Monte Jackson	Los Angeles Rams	DB
1976	3	13	73	Duke Fergerson	Dallas Cowboys	WR
1976	4	15	107	Craig Penrose	Denver Broncos	QB
1976	6	14	170	Greg Boyd	New England Patriots	DE
1976	11	9	300	Mike Gilbert	Philadelphia Eagles	DT
1976	13	16	363	Mel Jacobs	Detroit Lions	WR
1976	16	12	443	Reggie Lewis	San Francisco 49ers	DE
1977	11	5	284	Bill Helms	New York Giants	TE
1978	2	17	45	Deacon Turner	Cincinnati Bengals	RB
1978	2	25	53	Ron Smith	Los Angeles Rams	WR
1978	3	19	75	Whip Walton	Minnesota Vikings	LB
1978	5	6	116	Mike Douglass	Green Bay Packers	LB
1978	5	10	120	Terry Jackson	New York Giants	DB
1978	5	15	125	Dennis Pearson	Atlanta Falcons	WR
1979	4	21	103	Don Warren	Washington Redskins	TE
1979	6	19	156	Henry Williams	Oakland Raiders	DB
1979	8	12	204	Kent Perkov	Cleveland Browns	DE
1980	7	23	188	Terrell Ward	Philadelphia Eagles	DB
1980	10	14	263	Kevin Fiedel	Cleveland Browns	C
1981	6	12	150	Reuben Henderson	Chicago Bears	DB
1981	12	1	305	Jim Wilks	New Orleans Saints	DT
1982	2	21	48	Matt Kofler	Buffalo Bills	QB
1982	2	22	49	Vernon Dean	Washington Redskins	DB
1983	3	4	60	Clint Sampson	Denver Broncos	WR
1983	3	23	79	Todd Seabaugh	Pittsburgh Steelers	LB
1983	4	1	85	Phil Smith	Baltimore Colts	WR
1983	4	27	111	Doug Reed	Los Angeles Rams	DT
1983	10	19	270	Darius Durham	Tampa Bay Buccaneers	WR
1984u	2	9	37	Jim Sandusky	New York Jets	WR
1984u	3	4	60	Thomas Carter	Philadelphia Eagles	LB
1984u	3	25	81	Jeff Spek	Dallas Cowboys	TE
1984	3	23	79	Sean McNanie	Buffalo Bills	DE
1984	11	20	300	Mike Saxon	Detroit Lions	P
1985	2	5	33	Tory Nixon	Washington Redskins	DB
1985	3	6	62	James Johnson	Detroit Lions	LB
1985	3	15	71	Rich Moran	Green Bay Packers	G
1985	9	11	235	Mike Waters	New York Jets	RB
1986	2	16	43	Webster Slaughter	Cleveland Browns	WR
1986	4	16	98	Dan Knight	Green Bay Packers	T
1986	5	20	130	Vince Warren	New York Giants	WR
1987	3	6	62	Robert Awalt	St. Louis Cardinals	TE
1988	7	28	193	Harold Hicks	Washington Redskins	DB
1988	9	25	246	Clarence Nunn	New Orleans Saints	DB
1988	10	25	274	Todd Santos	New Orleans Saints	QB
1988	12	10	315	Wayne Ross	Washington Redskins	P
1988	12	21	326	Dave DesRochers	Seattle Seahawks	T
1989	5	23	135	Alfred Jackson	Los Angeles Rams	WR
1990	8	10	203	Roman Fortin	Detroit Lions	G
1990	12	9	313	Robert Claiborne	Detroit Lions	WR
1991	1	16	16	Dan McGwire	Seattle Seahawks	QB
1991	4	2	85	Pio Sagapolutele	Cleveland Browns	DT
1991	6	3	142	Nick Subis	Denver Broncos	T
1992	2	24	52	Patrick Rowe	Cleveland Browns	WR
1992	6	28	168	Ray Rowe	Washington Redskins	TE
1992	8	17	213	Jim Jennings	Kansas City Chiefs	G
1994	1	2	2	Marshall Faulk	Indianapolis Colts	RB
1994	2	1	30	Darnay Scott	Cincinnati Bengals	WR
1994	7	1	195	Ramondo Stallings	Cincinnati Bengals	DE
1995	6	33	204	Jamal Duff	New York Giants	DE
1996	5	34	166	La'Roi Glover	Oakland Raiders	DT
1996	7	41	250	DeAndre Maxwell	Washington Redskins	WR
1997	2	23	53	Will Blackwell	Pittsburgh Steelers	WR
1997	5	20	150	Nate Jacquet	Indianapolis Colts	WR
1997	5	24	154	George Jones	Pittsburgh Steelers	RB
1997	6	38	201	Ricky Parker	Chicago Bears	DB
1998	1	7	7	Kyle Turley	New Orleans Saints	T
1998	4	4	96	Az-Zahir Hakim	St. Louis Rams	WR
1998	7	10	199	Ephraim Salaam	Atlanta Falcons	T
2000	5	20	149	Kabeer Gbaja-Biamila	Green Bay Packers	LB
2000	7	14	220	Andrew Kline	St. Louis Rams	G
2000	7	34	240	Mike Malano	Minnesota Vikings	C
2002	2	18	50	Chester Pitts	Houston Texans	G
2002	6	25	197	Larry Ned	Oakland Raiders	RB
2002	6	28	200	Mike Houghton	Green Bay Packers	T
2003	5	34	169	J. R. Tolver	Miami Dolphins	WR
2004	5	20	152	Jeff Shoate	Denver Broncos	DB
2005	2	31	63	Matt McCoy	Philadelphia Eagles	LB
2005	3	14	78	Kirk Morrison	Oakland Raiders	LB
2005	4	14	115	Marviel Underwood	Green Bay Packers	DB
2006	3	30	94	Freddie Keiaho	Indianapolis Colts	LB
2006	6	21	190	Jeff Webb	Kansas City Chiefs	WR
2008	3	31	94	Kevin O'Connell	New England Patriots	QB
2008	6	23	189	Tyler Schmitt	Seattle Seahawks	C
2008	7	10	217	Brett Swain	Green Bay Packers	WR
2008	7	19	226	Chaz Schilens	Oakland Raiders	WR
2009	7	37	246	Lance Louis	Chicago Bears	G
2011	3	18	82	Vincent Brown	San Diego Chargers	WR
2011	7	46	249	DeMarco Sampson	Arizona Cardinals	WR
2012	3	4	67	Ronnie Hillman	Denver Broncos	RB
2012	4	34	129	Miles Burris	Oakland Raiders	LB
2012	6	15	185	Ryan Lindley	Arizona Cardinals	QB
2012	7	11	218	Jerome Long	Kansas City Chiefs	DT
2013	2	15	47	Gavin Escobar	Dallas Cowboys	TE
2013	3	6	68	Leon McFadden	Cleveland Browns	DB
2013	7	3	209	Brice Butler	Oakland Raiders	WR
2014	5	12	152	Nat Berhe	New York Giants	DB
2014	6	32	208	Eric Pinkins	Seattle Seahawks	DB
2015	4	31	130	Terry Poole	Seattle Seahawks	G
2017	4	16	122	Nico Siragusa	Baltimore Ravens	G
2017	4	26	132	Donnel Pumphrey	Philadelphia Eagles	RB
2017	5	5	149	Damontae Kazee	Atlanta Falcons	DB
2018	1	27	27	Rashaad Penny	Seattle Seahawks	RB
2018	7	19	237	Nick Bawden	Detroit Lions	FB
2019	3	22	86	Kahale Warring	Houston Texans	TE
2020	5	10	156	Keith Ismael	Washington Redskins	C
2021	4	3	108	Darren Hall	Atlanta Falcons	DB
2022	3	23	87	Cameron Thomas	Arizona Cardinals	DE
2022	4	7	112	Daniel Bellinger	New York Giants	TE
2022	6	1	180	Matt Araiza	Buffalo Bills	P
2022	6	7	186	Zachary Thomas	Chicago Bears	T
2026	1	27	27	Chris Johnson	Miami Dolphins	CB
