= San Diego State Aztecs football statistical leaders =

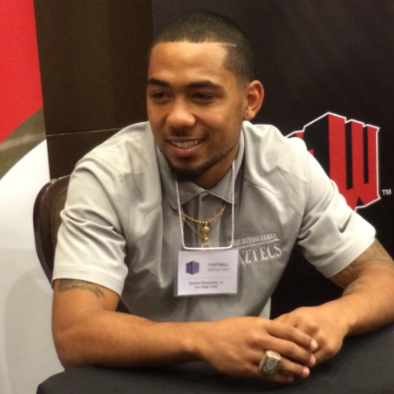
Donnel Pumphrey leads the Aztecs and the entire FBS in rushing yards.

The San Diego State Aztecs football statistical leaders are individual statistical leaders of the San Diego State Aztecs football program in various categories, including passing, rushing, receiving, total offense, all-purpose yardage, defensive stats, kicking, and scoring. Within those areas, the lists identify single-game, single-season, and career leaders. As of the upcoming 2026 season, the Aztecs represent San Diego State University in NCAA Division I as a member of the Division I FBS Pac-12 Conference.

Although San Diego State began competing in intercollegiate football in 1921, the school's official record book considers the "modern era" to have begun in 1947. Records from before this year are often incomplete and inconsistent, and they are generally not included in these lists.

These lists are dominated by more recent players for several reasons:

- Since 1947, seasons have increased from 10 games to 11 and then 12 games in length.
  - Additionally, during San Diego State's tenure in the Mountain West Conference (MW) from 1999 through 2025, with the conference having adopted a divisional alignment for football from 2013–2022, the Aztecs were grouped in the same division as Hawaii, meaning that it played at Hawaii every other year. This is relevant because the NCAA allows teams that play at Hawaii in a given season to schedule 13 regular-season games instead of the normal 12. However, the Aztecs never did so in any season during the MW's divisional era.
- Since 2013, the MW has held a conference championship game. The Aztecs appeared in this game twice (2015 and 2016), giving players in those seasons an extra game to accumulate statistics. Similarly, the Pac-12 will reinstate its championship game in 2026, giving future SDSU players an opportunity for an extra game.
- The NCAA didn't allow freshmen to play varsity football until 1972 (with the exception of the World War II years), allowing players to have four-year careers.
- Bowl games only began counting toward single-season and career statistics in 2002. The Aztecs have played in eight bowl games since this decision (all since 2010), giving many recent players an extra game to accumulate statistics.
- Since 2018, players have been allowed to participate in as many as four games in a redshirt season; previously, playing in even one game "burned" the redshirt. Since 2024, postseason games have not counted against the four-game limit. These changes to redshirt rules have given very recent players several extra games to accumulate statistics.

These lists are updated through the end of the 2025 season. Of particular note is running back Donnel Pumphrey, who leads the entire Division I FBS in rushing yards.

== Passing ==
=== Passing yards ===
Career
Rk	Player	Yards	Years
1	Ryan Lindley	12,690	2008 2009 2010 2011
2	Todd Santos	11,425	1984 1985 1986 1987
3	Billy Blanton	8,165	1993 1994 1995 1996
4	Kevin O'Connell	7,689	2004 2005 2006 2007
5	Dan McGwire	7,484	1989 1990
6	David Lowery	5,998	1989 1991 1992 1993
7	Brian Sipe	5,707	1969 1970 1971
8	Dennis Shaw	5,324	1968 1969
9	Adam Hall	5,173	2001 2002 2003
10	Quinn Kaehler	5,164	2013 2014

Single season
Rk	Player	Yards	Year
1	Todd Santos	3,932	1987
2	Dan McGwire	3,833	1990
3	Ryan Lindley	3,830	2010
4	Dan McGwire	3,651	1989
5	Dennis Shaw	3,394	1969
6	Matt Kofler	3,337	1981
7	Billy Blanton	3,300	1995
8	Adam Hall	3,253	2002
9	Billy Blanton	3,221	1996
10	Ryan Lindley	3,153	2011

Single game
Rk	Player	Yards	Year	Opponent
1	David Lowery	568	1991	BYU
2	Todd Santos	536	1987	Stanford
3	Dan McGwire	530	1990	New Mexico
4	Ryan Lindley	528	2010	Utah
5	Dennis Shaw	524	1968	Southern Miss
6	Adam Hall	516	2002	Arizona State
7	Mark McKay	513	1982	Hawaii
8	Dan McGwire	510	1989	Utah
9	Adam Hall	506	2002	Idaho
10	Dennis Shaw	463	1969	Pacific

=== Passing touchdowns ===
Career
Rk	Player	TDs	Years
1	Ryan Lindley	90	2008 2009 2010 2011
2	Todd Santos	70	1984 1985 1986 1987
3	Billy Blanton	67	1993 1994 1995 1996
4	Dennis Shaw	58	1968 1969
5	Kevin O'Connell	46	2004 2005 2006 2007
6	Brian Sipe	44	1969 1970 1971
	David Lowery	44	1989 1991 1992 1993
8	Dan McGwire	43	1989 1990
9	Don Horn	39	1965 1966
	Christian Chapman	39	2015 2016 2017 2018
10	Mark Halda	36	1977 1978 1979 1980
	Tim Gutierrez	36	1992 1993 1994

Single season
Rk	Player	TDs	Year
1	Dennis Shaw	39	1969
2	Billy Blanton	29	1996
3	Ryan Lindley	28	2010
4	Dan McGwire	27	1990
5	Todd Santos	26	1987
6	Joe Davis	24	1977
	Tim Gutierrez	24	1993
8	Brian Sipe	23	1970
	Billy Blanton	23	1995
	Ryan Lindley	23	2009
	Ryan Lindley	23	2011

Single game
Rk	Player	TDs	Year	Opponent
1	Dennis Shaw	9	1969	New Mexico State
2	Dennis Shaw	7	1968	Southern Miss
	Dennis Shaw	7	1969	Pacific
4	Rod Dowhower	6	1964	Fresno State
	Ryan Lindley	6	2009	Colorado State

== Rushing ==
=== Rushing yards ===
Career
Rk	Player	Yards	Years
1	Donnel Pumphrey	6,405	2013 2014 2015 2016
2	Marshall Faulk	4,786	1991 1992 1993
3	Larry Ned	3,792	1998 1999 2000 2001
4	Rashaad Penny	3,643	2014 2015 2016 2017
5	Ronnie Hillman	3,384	2010 2011
6	Jonas Lewis	3,015	1996 1997 1998 1999
7	Adam Muema	2,959	2011 2012 2013
8	George Jones	2,904	1995 1996
9	Norm Nygaard	2,766	1952 1953 1954
10	Wayne Pittman	2,498	1991 1992 1993 1994

Single season
Rk	Player	Yards	Year
1	Rashaad Penny	2,248	2017
2	Donnel Pumphrey	2,133	2016
3	Donnel Pumphrey	1,867	2014
4	George Jones	1,842	1995
5	Ronnie Hillman	1,711	2011
6	Donnel Pumphrey	1,653	2015
7	Marshall Faulk	1,630	1992
8	Marshall Faulk	1,586	1991
9	Larry Ned	1,549	2001
10	Ronnie Hillman	1,532	2010

Single game
Rk	Player	Yards	Year	Opponent
1	Marshall Faulk	386	1991	Pacific
2	Marshall Faulk	300	1992	Hawaii
3	Marshall Faulk	299	1992	BYU
4	Larry Ned	285	2001	Eastern Illinois
5	Donnel Pumphrey	281	2016	California
6	George Jones	275	1996	UNLV
7	Jim Allison	271	1964	San Francisco State
8	George Jones	270	1995	Fresno State
9	Donnel Pumphrey	261	2014	San Jose State
10	Paul Hewitt	259	1988	Air Force

=== Rushing touchdowns ===
Career
Rk	Player	TDs	Years
1	Donnel Pumphrey	62	2013 2014 2015 2016
2	Marshall Faulk	57	1991 1992 1993
3	Rashaad Penny	38	2014 2015 2016 2017
4	Larry Ned	36	1998 1999 2000 2001
	Ronnie Hillman	36	2010 2011
6	George Jones	34	1995 1996
	Adam Muema	34	2011 2012 2013
8	Paul Hewitt	28	1987 1988
9	Chris Hardy	22	1983 1984 1985 1986
10	Casey Brown	21	1982 1983 1984 1985

Single season
Rk	Player	TDs	Year
1	George Jones	23	1995
	Rashaad Penny	23	2017
3	Marshall Faulk	21	1991
	Marshall Faulk	21	1993
5	Donnel Pumphrey	20	2014
6	Ronnie Hillman	19	2011
7	Paul Hewitt	18	1987
8	Ronnie Hillman	17	2010
	Donnel Pumphrey	17	2015
	Donnel Pumphrey	17	2016

Single game
Rk	Player	TDs	Year	Opponent
1	Marshall Faulk	7	1991	Pacific
2	Marshall Faulk	5	1991	Hawaii
	George Jones	5	1995	Fresno State
	George Jones	5	1996	New Mexico

== Receiving ==
=== Receptions ===
Career
Rk	Player	Rec	Years
1	J. R. Tolver	262	1999 2000 2001 2002
2	Jeff Webb	234	2001 2003 2004 2005
3	Vincent Brown	209	2007 2008 2009 2010
4	Will Blackwell	197	1994 1995 1996
5	Monty Gilbreath	187	1986 1987 1988 1989
6	Tim Delaney	180	1968 1969 1970
7	Darnay Scott	178	1991 1992 1993
8	Jesse Matthews	174	2019 2020 2021 2022
9	Patrick Rowe	155	1987 1988 1990 1991
10	Gary Garrison	148	1964 1965

Single season
Rk	Player	Rec	Year
1	J. R. Tolver	128	2002
2	Kassim Osgood	108	2002
3	Jeff Webb	92	2005
4	Dwight McDonald	86	1974
	Will Blackwell	86	1995
6	Tim Delaney	85	1969
7	Webster Slaughter	82	1985
8	Craig Scoggins	81	1966
9	Monty Gilbreath	80	1989
10	Gary Garrison	78	1964

Single game
Rk	Player	Rec	Year	Opponent
1	J. R. Tolver	18	2002	Hawaii
2	Tom Reynolds	17	1971	Utah State
	Don Roberts	17	1982	California
	Curtis Shearer	17	1994	Air Force
5	Tim Delaney	16	1969	New Mexico State
	J. R. Tolver	16	2002	Utah
7	Craig Scoggins	15	1966	Cal State Los Angeles
	Webster Slaughter	15	1985	Oregon
	Will Blackwell	15	1995	BYU
	DeMarco Sampson	15	2009	Colorado State

=== Receiving yards ===
Career
Rk	Player	Yards	Years
1	J. R. Tolver	3,572	1999 2000 2001 2002
2	Darnay Scott	3,139	1991 1992 1993
3	Vincent Brown	3,110	2007 2008 2009 2010
4	Will Blackwell	2,896	1994 1995 1996
5	Jeff Webb	2,890	2001 2003 2004 2005
6	Patrick Rowe	2,678	1987 1988 1990 1991
7	Az-Zahir Hakim	2,622	1994 1995 1996 1997
8	Tim Delaney	2,535	1968 1969 1970
9	DeMarco Sampson	2,242	2005 2008 2009 2010
10	Monty Gilbreath	2,241	1986 1987 1988 1989

Single season
Rk	Player	Yards	Year
1	J. R. Tolver	1,785	2002
2	Kassim Osgood	1,552	2002
3	Patrick Rowe	1,392	1990
4	Vincent Brown	1,352	2010
5	Craig Scoggins	1,301	1966
6	Tim Delaney	1,300	1969
7	Gary Garrison	1,272	1964
8	Darnay Scott	1,262	1993
9	Tom Nettles	1,227	1968
10	DeMarco Sampson	1,220	2010

Single game
Rk	Player	Yards	Year	Opponent
1	Tom Nettles	362	1968	Southern Miss
2	J. R. Tolver	296	2002	Arizona State
3	Tom Reynolds	290	1971	Utah State
4	Gary Garrison	289	1964	Fresno State
5	J. R. Tolver	283	2002	Hawaii
6	Will Blackwell	280	1996	California
7	Tim Delaney	275	1969	New Mexico State
8	Darnay Scott	274	1992	UTEP
9	DeMarco Sampson	257	2009	Colorado State
10	Jeff Webb	253	2003	BYU

=== Receiving touchdowns ===
Career
Rk	Player	TDs	Years
1	Tom Reynolds	31	1969 1970 1971
2	Gary Garrison	26	1964 1965
3	Darnay Scott	25	1991 1992 1993
	Will Blackwell	25	1994 1995 1996
5	Vincent Brown	23	2007 2008 2009 2010
6	Tim Delaney	22	1968 1969 1970
7	Az-Zahir Hakim	21	1994 1995 1996 1997
8	Jeff Webb	20	2001 2003 2004 2005
9	J. R. Tolver	18	1999 2000 2001 2002
	DeMarco Sampson	18	2005 2008 2009 2010

Single season
Rk	Player	TDs	Year
1	Tom Reynolds	18	1969
2	Tim Delaney	14	1970
3	J. R. Tolver	13	2002
4	Ken Burrow	12	1970
	Ronnie Smith	12	1977
6	Will Blackwell	11	1996
7	Webster Slaughter	10	1985
	Dennis Arey	10	1990
	Darnay Scott	10	1993
	Jeff Webb	10	2005
	Vincent Brown	10	2010

Single game
Rk	Player	TDs	Year	Opponent
1	Tim Delaney	6	1969	New Mexico State
2	Gary Garrison	4	1964	Fresno State
	Tom Nettles	4	1968	Southern Miss
	Will Blackwell	4	1996	California

== Total offense ==
Total offense is the sum of passing and rushing statistics. It does not include receiving or returns.

=== Total offense yards ===
Career
Rk	Player	Yards	Years
1	Ryan Lindley	12,415	2008 2009 2010 2011
2	Todd Santos	10,513	1984 1985 1986 1987
3	Kevin O'Connell	9,001	2004 2005 2006 2007
4	Billy Blanton	8,014	1993 1994 1995 1996
5	Dan McGwire	7,087	1989 1990
6	Donnel Pumphrey	6,421	2013 2014 2015 2016
7	David Lowery	5,930	1989 1991 1992 1993
8	Brian Sipe	5,374	1969 1970 1971
9	Dennis Shaw	5,371	1968 1969
10	Adam Hall	5,007	2001 2002 2003

Single season
Rk	Player	Yards	Year
1	Ryan Lindley	3,799	2010
2	Todd Santos	3,688	1987
3	Dan McGwire	3,664	1990
4	Matt Kofler	3,528	1981
5	Kevin O'Connell	3,471	2007
6	Dan McGwire	3,423	1989
7	Billy Blanton	3,324	1995
8	Dennis Shaw	3,197	1969
9	Billy Blanton	3,161	1996
10	Adam Hall	3,143	2002

Single game
Rk	Player	Yards	Year	Opponent
1	Dan McGwire	528	1990	New Mexico
	David Lowery	528	1991	BYU
3	Dennis Shaw	526	1968	Southern Miss
4	Ryan Lindley	518	2010	Utah
5	Matt Kofler	517	1981	Iowa State
6	Mark McKay	510	1982	Hawaii
7	Todd Santos	504	1987	Stanford
8	Dan McGwire	498	1989	Utah
9	Adam Hall	497	2002	Arizona State
10	Adam Hall	496	2002	Idaho

=== Touchdowns responsible for ===
"Touchdowns responsible for" is the official NCAA term for combined passing and rushing touchdowns.

Career
Rk	Player	TDs	Years
1	Ryan Lindley	92	2008 2009 2010 2011
2	Dennis Shaw	72	1968 1969
3	Todd Santos	71	1984 1985 1986 1987
4	Billy Blanton	68	1993 1994 1995 1996
5	Kevin O'Connell	65	2004 2005 2006 2007
6	Donnel Pumphrey	63	2013 2014 2015 2016
7	David Lowery	48	1989 1991 1992 1993
8	Dan McGwire	46	1989 1990
9	Brian Sipe	45	1969 1970 1971

Single season
Rk	Player	TDs	Year
1	Dennis Shaw	45	1969
2	Billy Blanton	30	1996
3	Matt Kofler	28	1981
	Dan McGwire	28	1990
	Ryan Lindley	28	2010

Single game
Rk	Player	TDs	Year	Opponent
1	Dennis Shaw	9	1969	New Mexico State

== All-purpose yardage ==
All-purpose yardage is the sum of all yards credited to a player who is in possession of the ball. It includes rushing, receiving, and returns, but does not include passing.

Statistics are from the 2017 San Diego State football record book as updated to reflect the 2017 season.

Career
Rk	Player	Yards	Years
1	Donnel Pumphrey	7,515	2013 2014 2015 2016
2	Rashaad Penny	6,654	2014 2015 2016 2017
3	Marshall Faulk	5,595	1991 1992 1993
4	Darnay Scott	4,658	1991 1992 1993
5	Monty Gilbreath	4,376	1986 1987 1988 1989
6	Colin Lockett	4,376	2010 2011 2012 2013
7	Vincent Brown	3,957	2007 2008 2009 2010
8	Patrick Rowe	3,940	1987 1988 1990 1991
9	Larry Ned	3,957	1998 1999 2000 2001
10	Az-Zahir Hakim	3,704	1994 1995 1996 1997

Single season
Rk	Player	Yards	Year
1	Rashaad Penny	2,974	2017
2	Donnel Pumphrey	2,340	2016
3	Marshall Faulk	2,174	1993
4	Donnel Pumphrey	2,069	2015
5	Donnel Pumphrey	2,027	2014
6	Ronnie Hillman	1,981	2011
7	George Jones	1,961	1995
8	Jim Sandusky	1,877	1983
9	J. R. Tolver	1,804	2002
10	Webster Slaughter	1,812	1985

Single game
Rk	Player	Yards	Year	Opponent
1	Rashaad Penny	429	2017	Nevada
2	Marshall Faulk	422	1991	Pacific
3	Darnay Scott	354	1992	UTEP
4	Rashaad Penny	353	2017	Arizona State
5	Darnay Scott	347	1991	BYU
6	Patrick Rowe	330	1990	UCLA
7	Ron Slack	322	1989	Long Beach State
8	Larry Ned	319	2001	Eastern Illinois
9	Donnel Pumphrey	310	2016	California
10	George Jones	306	1995	Fresno State

== Defense ==
=== Interceptions ===
Career
Rk	Player	Ints	Years
1	Damontae Kazee	17	2013 2014 2015 2016
2	Jack Kaiser	14	1946 1947 1948
3	Bob Tomlinson	13	1946 1947 1948 1949
	Jason Moore	13	1994 1995 1996 1997
5	Dick Adair	12	1947 1948 1949
	Ed Ricketts	12	1950 1951
	Tariq Thompson	12	2017 2018 2019 2020
8	Verne Dodds	11	1952 1953 1954
	Dick Morris	11	1958 1959 1960
	Tom Deckert	11	1969 1970 1971

Single season
Rk	Player	Ints	Year
1	Ed Ricketts	12	1951
2	Luq Barcoo	9	2019
3	Tom Deckert	8	1969
	Damontae Kazee	8	2015
5	Fred Bates	7	1950
	Galen Pavelko	7	1969
	Larry Parker	7	2011
	Damontae Kazee	7	2016

Single game
Rk	Player	Ints	Year	Opponent
1	Dick Adair	4	1949	New Mexico State
2	Ed Ricketts	3	1951	San Diego Marines
	Damontae Kazee	3	2015	San Diego
	Luq Barcoo	3	2019	Colorado State

=== Tackles ===
Career
Rk	Player	Tackles	Years
1	Whip Walton	407	1974 1975 1976 1977
2	Kirk Morrison	396	2001 2002 2003 2004
3	Russell Allen	375	2005 2006 2007 2008
4	Rico Curtis	355	1996 1997 1998 1999
5	Jason Moore	328	1994 1995 1996 1997
6	Calvin Munson	301	2013 2014 2015 2016
7	Nat Berhe	299	2010 2011 2012 2013
8	John Wesselman	296	1987 1988 1989
9	Mike Fox	293	1979 1980 1981 1982
10	Craigus Thompson	292	1993 1994 1995 1996

Single season
Rk	Player	Tackles	Year
1	Rick Carusa	198	1980
2	Damon Pieri	143	1991
3	Alan Dale	140	1981
4	Whip Walton	139	1977
5	Andy Osborne	137	1997
6	Scott Carter	132	1978
7	Lou Foster	131	1991
8	Kyahva Tezino	126	2018
9	Whip Walton	125	1976
	Todd Richards	125	1985
	Matt McCoy	125	2003

Single game
Rk	Player	Tackles	Year	Opponent
1	Russell Allen	22	2007	Utah
2	Ty Youngs	21	1971	Iowa State
	Alan Dale	21	1981	Iowa State
	Corey Boudreaux	21	2008	Air Force
5	Whip Walton	20	1977	Tulsa
	Lee Brannon	20	1988	Hawaii

=== Sacks ===
Career
Rk	Player	Sacks	Years
1	Kabeer Gbaja-Biamila	34.0	1996 1997 1998 1999
2	Mike Douglass	26.0	1976 1977
3	Jonah Tavai	24.0	2019 2020 2021 2022
4	Cameron Thomas	21.0	2019 2020 2021
5	Brett Faryniarz	20.5	1984 1985 1986 1987
6	Trey White	19.5	2022 2023 2024 2025
7	Miles Burris	19.0	2008 2009 2010 2011
	Alex Barrett	19.0	2013 2014 2015 2016
9	Kevin Richey	18.5	1979 1980 1981 1982
	Levi Esene	18.5	1984 1985 1986
	La'Roi Glover	18.5	1992 1993 1994 1995

Single season
Rk	Player	Sacks	Year
1	Mike Douglass	21.0	1976
2	Brett Faryniarz	13.0	1987
3	Andy Coviello	12.5	1991
	Kabeer Gbaja-Biamila	12.5	1997
	Trey White	12.5	2024
6	Cameron Thomas	11.5	2021
7	Kabeer Gbaja-Biamila	11.0	1999
8	Levi Esene	10.5	1986
	Jonah Tavai	10.5	2022
	Trey White	10.5	2025

Single game
Rk	Player	Sacks	Year	Opponent
1	Mike Douglass	5.0	1976	UTEP
2	Andy Coviello	4.5	1991	New Mexico
3	Levi Esene	3.5	1986	BYU
	Kyle Kelley	3.5	2015	Cincinnati

== Kicking ==
=== Field goals made ===
Career
Rk	Player	FGs	Years
1	Andy Trakas	56	1989 1990 1991 1992
2	John Baron II	50	2016 2017 2018
	Matt Araiza	50	2019 2020 2021
4	Peter Holt	48	1993 1994 1995 1996
	Garrett Palmer	48	2004 2005 2006 2007
6	Nate Tandberg	46	1997 1998 1999 2000
7	Donny Hageman	37	2014 2015
8	Gabriel Plascencia	36	2023 2024 2025
9	Jack Browning	35	2021 2022 2023
10	Chris O'Brien	28	1984 1985

Single season
Rk	Player	FGs	Year
1	Matt Araiza	22	2019
2	John Baron II	21	2016
3	Donny Hageman	20	2014
	Jack Browning	20	2022
5	Gabriel Plascencia	19	2025
6	Andy Trakas	18	1990
	J.C Mejia	18	2003
	Matt Araiza	18	2021
9	Chris O'Brien	17	1985
	Tommy Kirovski	17	2002
	Abelardo Perez	17	2010
	Donny Hageman	17	2015
	John Baron II	17	2018

Single game
Rk	Player	FGs	Year	Opponent
1	Benny Ricardo	4	1974	UTEP
	Steve LaPlant	4	1975	Oregon State
	Marco Morales	4	1982	UNLV
	Peter Holt	4	1993	Minnesota
	Peter Holt	4	1996	Idaho
	Tommy Kirovski	4	2002	Hawaii
	J.C Mejia	4	2003	Wyoming
	Wes Feer	4	2013	Eastern Illinois
	John Baron II	4	2016	Utah State
	Jack Browning	4	2023	Fresno State
	Cooper DiLeva	4	2026	Fresno State

=== Field goal percentage ===
Career
Rk	Player	FG%	Years
1	Gabriel Plascencia	87.8%	2023 2024 2025
2	Chris O'Brien	87.5%	1984 1985
3	John Baron II	83.3%	2016 2017 2018
4	Donny Hageman	78.7%	2014 2015
5	Jack Browning	74.5%	2021 2022 2023
6	Matt Araiza	73.5%	2019 2020 2021
7	Marco Morales	73.3%	1982 1983
8	Garrett Palmer	71.6%	2004 2005 2006 2007
9	Tyler Ackerson	71.4%	1987 1988
10	Steve Duncan	69.0%	1977 1978

Single season
Rk	Player	FG%	Year
1	Gabriel Plascencia	92.9%	2024
2	John Baron II	91.3%	2016
3	Chris O'Brien	89.5%	1985
4	Garrett Palmer	88.2%	2005
5	Garrett Palmer	86.7%	2007
6	Chris O'Brien	84.6%	1984
	Matt Araiza	84.6%	2019
8	Gabriel Plascencia	82.6%	2025
9	Donny Hageman	80.0%	2014
	John Baron II	80.0%	2017
	Jack Browning	80.0%	2022

== Scoring ==
=== Points ===
Career
Rk	Player	Points	Years
1	Donnel Pumphrey	402	2013 2014 2015 2016
2	Marshall Faulk	376	1991 1992 1993
3	Andy Trakas	338	1989 1990 1991 1992
4	Rashaad Penny	312	2014 2015 2016 2017
5	Peter Holt	302	1993 1994 1995 1996
6	Garrett Palmer	260	2004 2005 2006 2007
7	Nate Tandberg	239	1997 1998 1999 2000
8	Ronnie Hillman	228	2010 2011
9	Adam Muema	220	2011 2012 2013
10	Larry Ned	216	1998 1999 2000 2001

Single season
Rk	Player	Points	Year
1	Rashaad Penny	168	2017
2	Marshall Faulk	144	1993
	Paul Hewitt	144	1987
4	George Jones	138	1995
5	Ronnie Hillman	120	2011
	Donnel Pumphrey	120	2014
	Donnel Pumphrey	120	2015
8	John Baron II	109	2016
9	Tom Reynolds	108	1969
	Ronnie Hillman	108	2010

Single game
Rk	Player	Points	Year	Opponent
1	Marshall Faulk	44	1991	Pacific
2	Tim Delaney	36	1969	New Mexico State
3	George Jones	32	1996	New Mexico
4	Marshall Faulk	30	1991	Hawaiʻi
	George Jones	30	1995	Fresno State
6	13 times by 9 players	24	Most recent: Rashaad Penny, 2017 vs. Nevada	

=== Touchdowns ===
Unlike the "Total touchdowns" lists in the "Total offense" section, these lists count touchdowns scored. Accordingly, these lists include rushing, receiving, and return touchdowns, but not passing touchdowns.

Career
Rk	Player	TDs	Years
1	Donnel Pumphrey	67	2013 2014 2015 2016
2	Marshall Faulk	62	1991 1992 1993
3	Rashaad Penny	52	2014 2015 2016 2017
4	Ronnie Hillman	38	2010 2011
5	Larry Ned	36	1998 1999 2000 2001
	Adam Muema	36	2011 2012 2013
7	Paul Hewitt	34	1987 1988
	George Jones	34	1995 1996
9	Tom Reynolds	25	1969 1970 1971
	Casey Brown	25	1982 1983 1984 1985
	Darnay Scott	25	1991 1992 1993
	Will Blackwell	25	1994 1995 1996

Single season
Rk	Player	TDs	Year
1	Rashaad Penny	28	2017
2	Marshall Faulk	24	1993
	Paul Hewitt	24	1987
4	George Jones	23	1995
5	Ronnie Hillman	23	2011
6	Donnel Pumphrey	20	2014
	Donnel Pumphrey	20	2015
8	Tom Reynolds	18	1969
	Ronnie Hillman	18	2010
10	Adam Muema	17	2012
	Donnel Pumphrey	17	2016

Single game
Rk	Player	TDs	Year	Opponent
1	Marshall Faulk	7	1991	Pacific
2	Tim Delaney	6	1969	New Mexico State
3	Marshall Faulk	5	1991	Hawaiʻi
	George Jones	5	1995	Fresno State
	George Jones	5	1996	New Mexico
6	13 times by 9 players	4	Most recent: Rashaad Penny, 2017 vs. Nevada (2 rushing, 1 kickoff return, 1 punt return)	
