= David Lee Grayson =

David Lee Grayson may refer to:

- Dave Grayson (1939–2017), former American football defensive back who played for the Dallas Texans, Kansas City Chiefs, and Oakland Raiders
- David Grayson (American football) (born 1964), his son, professional American football player who played linebacker for five seasons for the Cleveland Browns and San Diego Chargers
