= List of Cal Poly Pomona Broncos in the NFL draft =

The following is a list of Cal Poly Pomona Broncos in the NFL Draft: that is, those players who played college football at California State Polytechnic University, Pomona and were drafted by NFL teams.

== Key ==
| B | Back | K | Kicker | NT | Nose tackle |
| C | Center | LB | Linebacker | FB | Fullback |
| DB | Defensive back | P | Punter | HB | Halfback |
| DE | Defensive end | QB | Quarterback | WR | Wide receiver |
| DT | Defensive tackle | RB | Running back | G | Guard |
| E | End | T | Offensive tackle | TE | Tight end |

== Selections ==
| Year | Round | Pick | Overall | Player | Team | Position |
|---|---|---|---|---|---|---|
| 1972 | 16 | 3 | 393 | John Wiegmann | Cincinnati Bengals | WR |
| 1987 | 4 | 3 | 87 | Ron Hall | Tampa Bay Buccaneers | TE |
| 1987 | 6 | 7 | 147 | Al Smith | Houston Oilers | LB |
| 1987 | 8 | 22 | 217 | David Grayson | San Francisco 49ers | LB |
