= Billy Blanton =

Profile
- Position: Quarterback

Personal information
- Born: c. 1975

Career information
- High school: Mater Dei (Santa Ana, CA)
- College: San Diego State (1993–1996)

Billy Blanton (born c. 1975) is a former American football quarterback. He played college football for the San Diego State Aztecs from 1993 to 1996. He ranked among the leading quarterbacks in major-college football with a 158.8 passing efficiency rating in 1995 (2nd), 169.6 passing efficiency rating in 1996 (3rd), 66% completion percentage in 1995 (3rd), 3,300 passing yards in 1995 (4th), 3,221 passing yards in 1996 (9th), 23 passing touchdowns in 1995 (8th), 29 passing touchdowns (6th), 8.9 passing yards per attempt in 1995 (4th), and 9.4 passing yards per attempt in 1996 (3rd). In four years at San Diego State, he completed 588 of 920 passes (63.9%) for 8,165 yards, 67 touchdowns, 25 interceptions, and a 157.1 passer rating.

== See also ==
- San Diego State Aztecs football statistical leaders
