= Lincoln High School (San Diego, California) =

Public high school in San Diego, California, United States

Coordinates: 32°42′11.84″N 117°5′33.27″W

- Lincoln High School

Location
- 4777 Imperial Avenue; San Diego, California, 92113; United States

Information
- Type: Senior high school
- Established: 1955 (as a high school)
- School district: San Diego Unified
- Teaching staff: 64.19 (FTE)
- Grades: 9-12
- Enrollment: 1,480 (2023–2024)
- Student to teacher ratio: 23.06
- Campus: Urban
- Colors: Green and white
- Mascot: Hornets
- Built: 1949
- Razed: 2003
- Reopened: September 2007
- Website: Official website

Abraham Lincoln High School (also known as Lincoln High Educational Complex, Lincoln High School, or simply Lincoln), is an urban public high school in San Diego, California, United States.In the 2025–26 academic year, Lincoln had 1,480 students. It is part of San Diego Unified School District. It serves approximately 2100-2700 students in grades 9–12 in the K–12 education system. It is located in the Lincoln Park neighborhood of Southeast San Diego, part of the Encanto neighborhoods. It was named after President Abraham Lincoln.

Opened in 1949 and originally serving middle school students, Lincoln was converted into a high school in 1955. The original buildings were demolished and rebuilt during 2003–2007.

== Construction of facilities in the 2000s ==
Lincoln High School opened its doors to high school students in the 1950s. The old Lincoln High School was built in the 1950s shortly after the end of World War II, and the original campus had a basement that could serve as a fallout shelter Expansion of the school was done on existing facilities until 2003. On September 24, 2003, Lincoln's cafeteria was the first building to be demolished. The entire campus (except the gym) and a few homes nearby were eventually razed to make way for construction of the new campus. This was a result of an elected ballot proposition approved by its citizens. During construction, many students were displaced and relocated to other high schools in the district. The campus expanded with additional acquisition of property through eminent domain.

Before demolition, the campus had been infamous for its gang activity, particularly when graduating senior Willie James Jones Jr. was gunned down in 1994, just days before he was to matriculate to the prestigious Cornell University, hitting headlines and sparking outrage all over the San Diego media. The school also had been criticized for being behind academically, and there remained some skepticism in the community about Lincoln's reopening over those criticisms. Soon after Jones's death, Pastor Roy Dixon was told by the principal that "kids entered Lincoln with extremely low reading levels and could not perform academically."

Lincoln High School was reopened on September 4, 2007. The new 24-acre (97,000 m^{2}) campus was designed by architect and Lincoln alum, Joseph Martinez (class of 1966), and rebuilt by many Lincoln alumni who took part in the construction of the school. For $129 million, Lincoln was the most expensive campus in its district at the time of its re-opening in 2007.

In its newly rebuilt form, Lincoln now features major improvements such as an increased student enrollment capacity of 2,700 (from an average of 800 students during Lincoln's last few years before demolition), a 790-seat performing arts center, a football and track stadium that can seat 3,700, and other facilities for press and concessions. The improvements addressed concerns over Lincoln's previously dilapidated and outdated facilities, proper allocation of rooms per grade enrollment, and the increasing high school enrollment pressures of the neighborhood, in addition to public input and suggestions given by members of the Lincoln community. The site also features modern, state-of-the-art building design and facilities specialized to the curriculum.

== Academic program ==
The Lincoln-Gompers Redevelopment Committee noted the paramount importance of holding Lincoln's students, often from groups historically under-served by the public education system, to high expectations within a rigorous, standards-based curriculum framework.

Upon Lincoln's re-opening, all students were required to fulfill the "A-G" subject area requirements for admission to the University of California, two years before San Diego Unified codified an "A-G for all" policy under then-superintendent, Terry Grier. Due in part to the uneven diaspora of its middle school students to charters and bussing to schools north of the I-8, Lincoln was privately criticized within the district for being "too ambitious" in its academic aspirations in 2007, because data indicated many incoming first-year students to Lincoln were often under-prepared in comparison to their grade-level peers in key academic disciplines such as English and math. The AP participation rate at Lincoln is 7%.

Lincoln's fledgling academic program grew from five AP (Advanced Placement) class offerings in 2007 to 18 offerings in 2010, including AP Environmental Science, AP Language and AP Literature, AP Calculus, and AP Music.

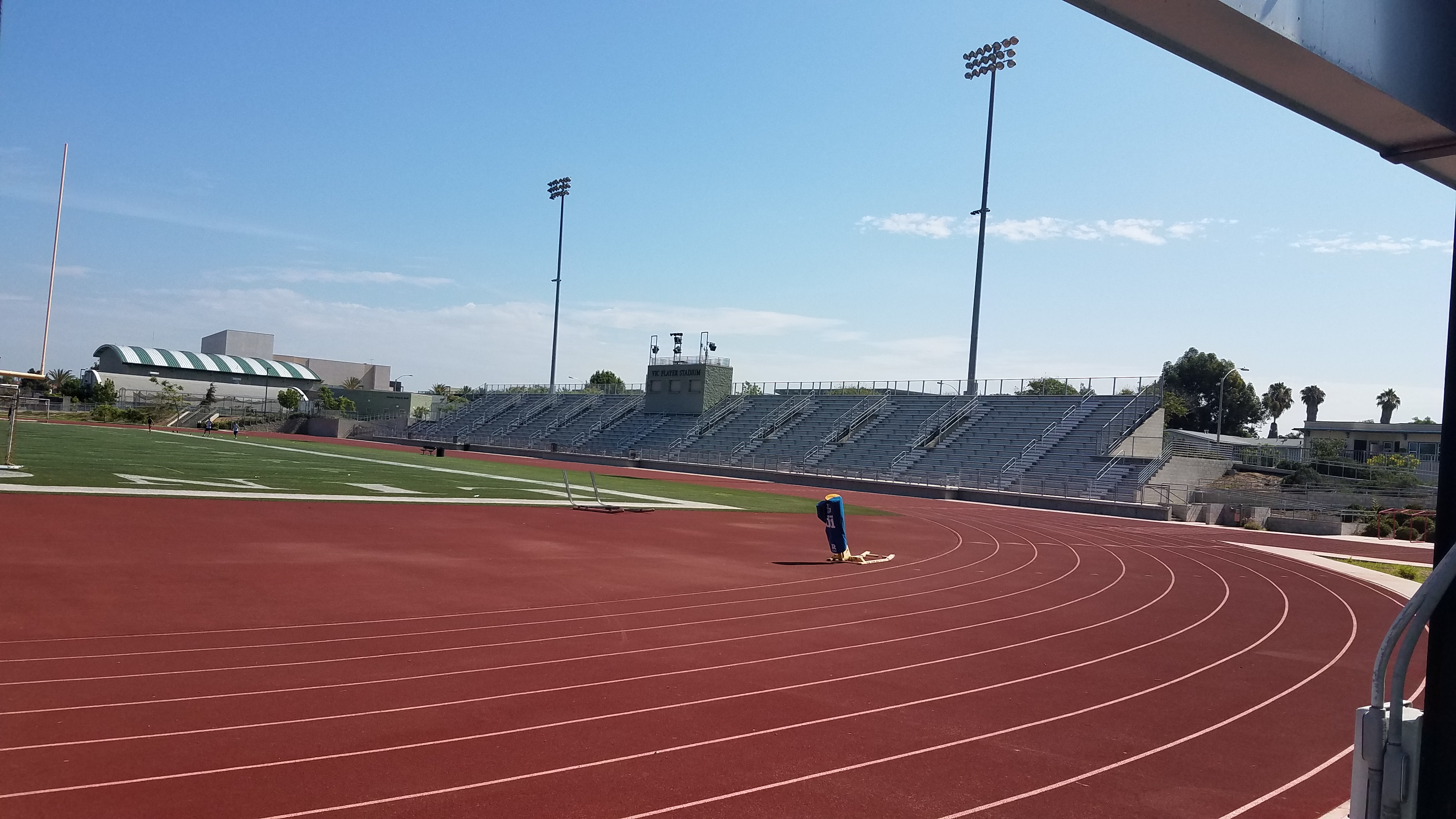
Track field

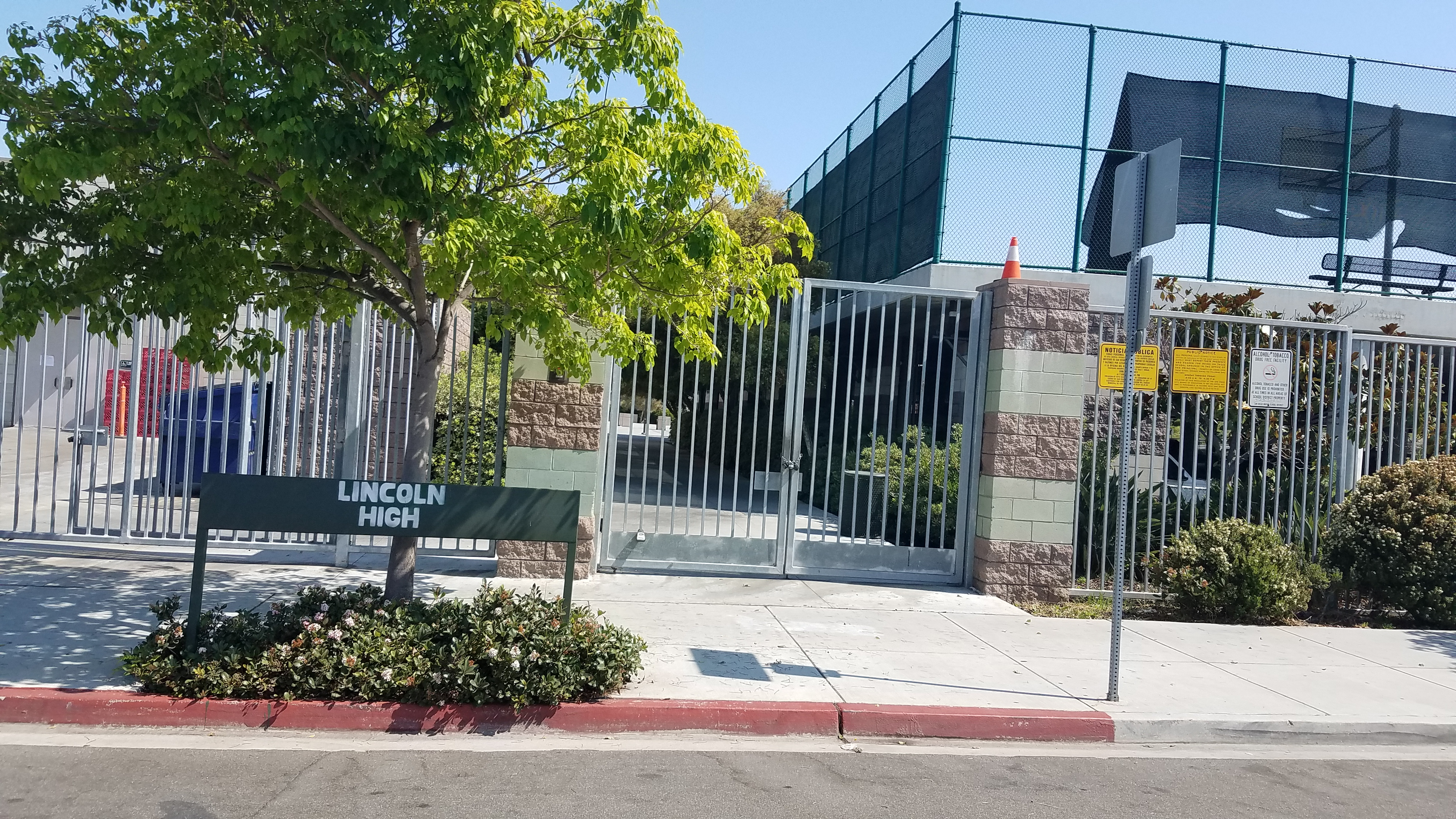
Lincoln High School

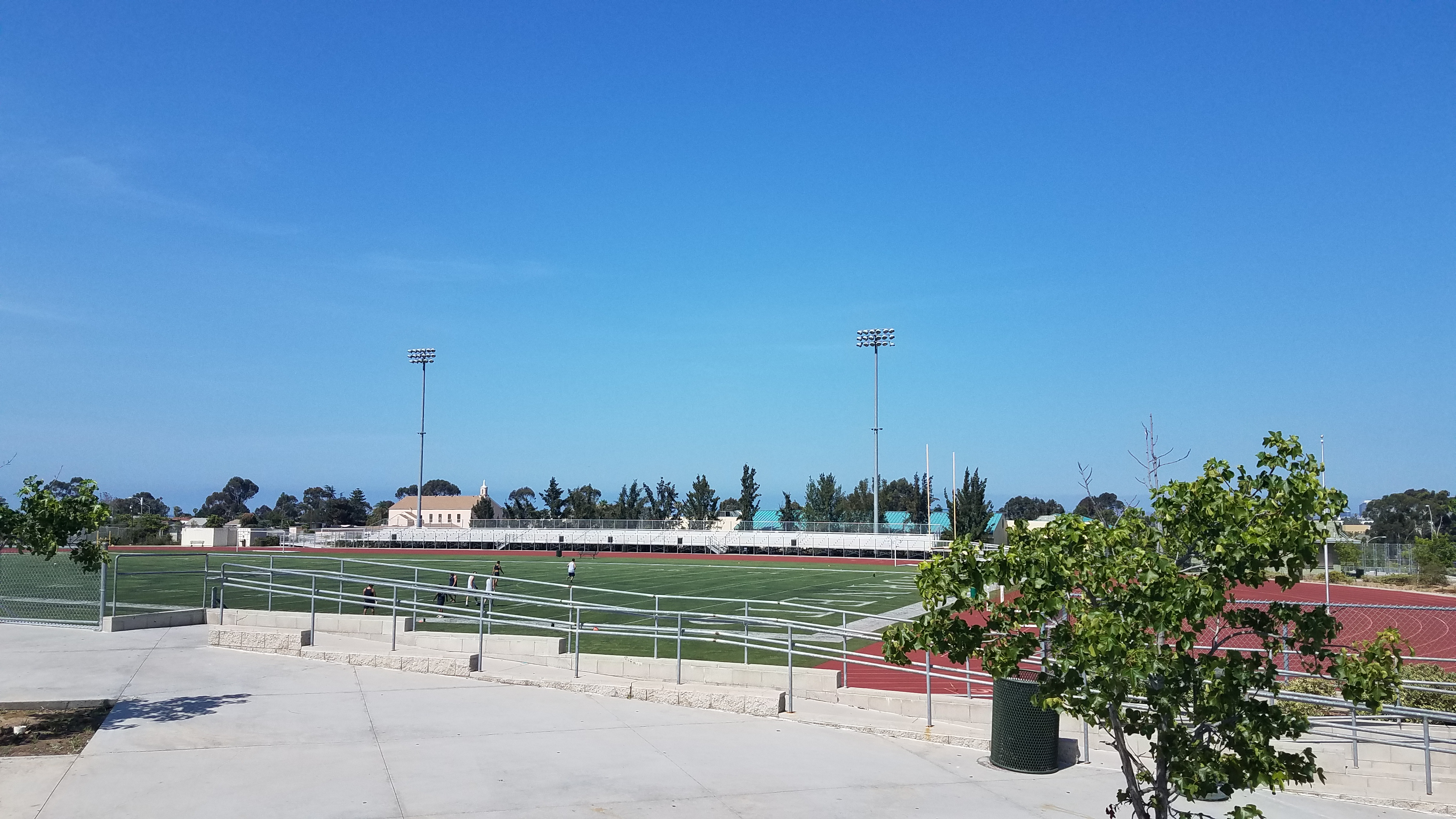
Track field

== Demographics ==
Lincoln High School is located in Lincoln Park, a historically working-class, African-American neighborhood in Southeast San Diego. Beginning in the late 1990s and accelerating in the early 2000s up until its closure in 2002, Lincoln High's demographics began to shift as Latino, Vietnamese, Samoan, Filipino, Laotian, and other ethnic groups moved in, attracted by residential and business redevelopment, competitive home and rental pricing, close proximity to transportation hubs such as the Market Street Trolley Station, and quick access to the I-805 and CA-94. When Lincoln reopened in 2007, for the first time Latino students were the majority, reflecting the change in the demographics of the neighborhood but also soon coinciding with the severe economic downturn of 2008, which contributed significantly to student mobility. The student population has since stabilized at approximately 2100 students. As of the 2009 school year, the student body was composed of approximately 35% African-American, 55% Hispanic or Latino, and 10% other groups. Despite shifts in racial, residential, and income demographics since its reopening, over 85% of Lincoln High's students still qualify for free- and reduced-lunch programs. In 2016, the demographics had changed to 68.62% Hispanic. By 2016, the African-American population of the school had dropped to 18.45%.

== Academic performance ==
Since 2007, Lincoln students have achieved double-digit gains on state test scores every year, with the largest increase coming in the 2008–09 school year. Starting with a baseline score of 540 in the 2007–8 school year (the first year of testing), Lincoln students were expected by the State of California to gain only 13 points on the California Standards Test (CST) in the 2008–09 school year; instead, students gained 47 points, pushing the API (Academic Performance Index) growth score to 587. Despite these gains, in 2010 Lincoln was unable to avoid falling into "Program Improvement" under the NCLB (No Child Left Behind Act) federal legislation guidelines because it failed to meet mandated proficiency targets with student subgroups two years in a row, notably English Language Learners (ELLs). According to NCLB, 100% percent of students were predicted to be proficient in English and math by 2014. As of the end of 2011, Lincoln's API has grown to a current score of 617, a growth of 77 points in 4 years. The average SAT scores in 2016 were 456 in Reading and 457 in Math.

== Notable people ==
- Damon Allen, quarterback, Canadian Football League all-time leading passer from 2006 to 2011
- Marcus Allen, running back, member of College and Pro Football Hall of Fame, Heisman Trophy winner, Super Bowl champion and MVP, Class of 1978
- Lew Barnes, football player
- Scott Byers, football player
- Ronnie Yell, Football player Arizona Cardinals / Cornerback, Toronto Argonauts/ Defensive back, BC Lions / Defensive back
- Kern Carson, former halfback of the San Diego Chargers, New York Jets, and the Toronto Argonauts
- Terrell Davis, running back, member of Pro Football Hall of Fame, 2-time Super Bowl champion and Super Bowl MVP, Class of 1990
- Dave Grayson, AFL all-time interceptions leader
- David Grayson, NFL player, Class of 1992
- Jimmy Gunn, professional football player
- Wally Henry, football player
- Dave Lewis, football player
- Saladin Martin, football player
- Dominic McGuire, basketball player
- Bob Mendoza, baseball player, San Diego Hall of Champions inductee, played football and baseball at Lincoln, Class of 1956
- Keith Mitchell, former outfielder for the Atlanta Braves and cousin of MLB All-Star Kevin Mitchell
- Steve Pierce, football player
- Norman Powell, basketball player for UCLA and for NBA's Chicago Bulls, second-round draft pick for Milwaukee Bucks, Class of 2011, 2019 NBA Champion
- Doug Reed, football player
- Roderick Robinson II, football player
- Tyree Robinson, football player
- Patrick Rowe, football player
- Mark Sanford, basketball player for University of Washington, second-round pick in 1997 NBA draft, Class of 1994
- Akili Smith, pro football quarterback, third overall selection of 1999 NFL draft
- Steve Taylor, football player, Canadian Football League, 1989 to 1997
- Robert West, football player
- Dwayne Wright, football player
