= Whip Walton =

American football player (born 1955)

No. 59
- Position: Linebacker

Personal information
- Born: July 16, 1955 (age 71); Corona, California, U.S.
- Listed height: 6 ft 2 in (1.88 m)
- Listed weight: 225 lb (102 kg)

Career information
- High school: Bolsa Grande (Garden Grove, California)
- College: San Diego State
- NFL draft: 1978: 3rd round, 75th overall pick

Career history
- Minnesota Vikings (1978); New York Giants (1980); San Diego Chargers (1981)*
- * Offseason or practice squad member only
- Stats at Pro Football Reference

Whip Walton (born July 16, 1955) is an American former professional football linebacker who played for the New York Giants of the National Football League (NFL). He played college football for the San Diego State Aztecs and was selected by the Minnesota Vikings in the third round of the 1978 NFL draft.

== Early life ==
Whip Walton was born on July 16, 1955, in Corona, California. He attended Bolsa Grande High School in Garden Grove, California.

== College career ==
Walton enrolled at San Diego State University to play college football for the Aztecs. He was a four-year letterman from 1974 to 1977. He was the defensive team captain his senior year in 1977, and set the school's (since-broken) single-season tackles record with 139. Walton finished his college career with three interceptions for 46 yards and a still-standing school-record of 407 tackles. He was inducted into San Diego State's athletics hall of fame in 2017.

== Professional career ==
Walton was selected by the Minnesota Vikings in the third round, with the 75th overall pick, of the 1978 NFL draft. On August 15, 1978, he was placed on injured reserve, where he spent the entire 1978 season. He was released on August 21, 1979.

Walton signed with the New York Giants on February 1, 1980. He was released on September 1 but re-signed on September 4. He played in the first two games of the 1980 season before being placed on injured reserve on September 15. Walton was released by the Giants on October 1, 1980.

Walton signed with the San Diego Chargers on June 22, 1981. He was released on August 17, 1981.

== Name ==
In a May 3, 1978, article in the The Duluth News-Tribune written by Bruce Bennett, Walton said "My dad was a 'chief' in the Navy when I was born. He named me. I've never forgiven him." Bennett then wrote "Just what the connection is between Navy blue and the name Whip is not clear".

== See also ==
- San Diego State Aztecs football statistical leaders
