= 2015 Hawaii Bowl =

- 14th Hawaii Bowl
San Diego State Aztecs	Cincinnati Bearcats
(10–3)	(7–5)
Mountain West	The American
42	7
Head coach: Rocky Long	Head coach: Tommy Tuberville
	1	2	3	4	Total
San Diego State	14	7	7	14	42
Cincinnati	0	0	0	7	7
- Date: December 24, 2015
- Season: 2015
- Stadium: Aloha Stadium
- Location: Honolulu, Hawaii
- MVP: San Diego State FB Dakota Gordon
- Favorite: Cincinnati by 2½
- Referee: Rodney Burnette (C-USA)
- Attendance: 22,793
- Payout: US$TBD

United States TV coverage
- Network: ESPN/ESPN Radio
- Announcers: Adam Amin, Greg McElroy, & Holly Rowe (ESPN); Kevin Winter, Mike Golic, & Mike Golic, Jr. (ESPN Radio)

The 2015 Hawaii Bowl was a post-season American college football bowl game played on December 24, 2015 at Aloha Stadium in Honolulu, Hawaii. The fourteenth edition of the Hawaii Bowl featured the Cincinnati Bearcats of the American Athletic Conference against the San Diego State Aztecs from the Mountain West Conference. It began at 3:15 p.m. HST and aired on ESPN. It was one of the 2015–16 bowl games that concluded the 2015 FBS football season.

== Teams ==
The game featured the Cincinnati Bearcats, with a record of 7–5, against San Diego State, with a record of 10-3 and on a 9-game winning streak going into the game. The Aztecs defeated the Bearcats by a score of 42-7.

=== Cincinnati Bearcats ===
This was the Bearcats' 17th bowl game (they were 8–8 all-time in bowl games), their fifth consecutive bowl appearance, and their first bowl game in Hawaii.

=== San Diego State Aztecs ===
San Diego State, playing its sixth straight bowl game, had won all of its eight regular conference games this year. They then defeated Air Force, 27-24 in the title game for the school's 20th football conference championship. Head coach Rocky Long is among 13 active coaches to have guided his current team to a bowl game during his first five seasons as the head man. This was also the Aztecs' first bowl game in Hawaii since 1952.

== Game summary ==
=== Scoring Summary ===
Scoring summary

Quarter	Time	Drive			Team	Scoring information	Score	
Quarter	Time	Plays	Yards	TOP	Team	Scoring information	SDSU	CIN
1	14:45	–	–	–	SDSU	Rashaad Penny 100-yard kick return, Donny Hageman kick good	7	0
1	9:08	9	85	4:32	SDSU	Mikah Holder 14-yard touchdown reception from Christian Chapman, Donny Hageman kick good	14	0
2	2:02	4	56	1:49	SDSU	Dakota Gordon 16-yard touchdown reception from Donnel Pumphrey, Donny Hageman kick good	21	0
3	5:14	8	67	3:30	SDSU	Dakota Gordon 1-yard touchdown run, Donny Hageman kick good	28	0
4	11:29	11	85	6:54	SDSU	Donnel Pumphrey 2-yard touchdown run, Donny Hageman kick good	35	0
4	9:04	–	–	–	SDSU	Interception returned 43 yards for touchdown by Alex Barrett, Donny Hageman kick good	42	0
4	3:21	12	73	5:35	CIN	Mike Boone 1-yard touchdown run, Andrew Gantz kick good	42	7
"TOP" = time of possession. For other American football terms, see Glossary of American football.							42	7

=== Statistics ===
Statistics	SDSU	CIN
First downs	22	15
Plays–yards	64–336	63–279
Rushes–yards	52–207	32–77
Passing yards	129	202
Passing: Comp–Att–Int	9–12–0	19–31–3
Time of possession	35:34	24:26
