= Brett Faryniarz =

American football player (born 1965)

No. 51, 57, 53, 55
- Position: Linebacker

Personal information
- Born: July 23, 1965 (age 61); Carmichael, California, U.S.
- Listed height: 6 ft 3 in (1.91 m)
- Listed weight: 230 lb (104 kg)

Career information
- High school: Cordova
- College: San Diego State
- NFL draft: 1988: undrafted

Career history
- Los Angeles Rams (1988–1991); San Francisco 49ers (1993); Houston Oilers (1994); Carolina Panthers (1995)

Career NFL statistics
- Tackles: 104
- Sacks: 6
- Fumble recoveries: 3
- Stats at Pro Football Reference

Brett Allen Faryniarz (born July 23, 1965) is an American former professional football player who played linebacker for seven seasons in the National Football League (NFL). In college, he was a defensive standout for the San Diego State Aztecs, starring on the team's much-maligned "Ocean Breeze" defense. The name derived from a comment by former UCLA quarterback Troy Aikman, who compared the team's pass defense to "just playing catch in the open air." Despite the defense's generally poor caliber, Faryniarz developed a reputation as a "solid quarterback sacker", taking Aikman down twice during the SDSU-UCLA game in the Rose Bowl. After starting three years for the Aztecs, Faryniarz played for the then-Los Angeles Rams, where he played linebacker. He finished his career on the inaugural Carolina Panthers team in 1995.

He was born in Carmichael, California.

== Acting career ==
In 2023, Faryniarz provides the voice of a football playing Eagle in the Junga the Dancing Yeti in Yeti Set Go film about sportsmanship and anti-bullying for children. In this scene, professional football players of the Mountain Football League set an example of good sportsmanship. Faryniarz who in real life had a reputation of sacking quarterbacks, sacks the lion quarterback played by NFL MVP Brian Sipe.
