= Kern Carson =

American football player (1941–2002)

No. 45, 26, 35
- Position: Halfback

Personal information
- Born: January 29, 1941; Hope, Arkansas, U.S.
- Died: March 2, 2002 (aged 61)
- Listed height: 6 ft 1 in (1.85 m)
- Listed weight: 200 lb (91 kg)

Career information
- High school: San Diego (CA) Lincoln
- College: San Diego State
- NFL draft: 1963: 17th round, 229th overall pick
- AFL draft: 1963: 29th round, 229th overall pick

Career history
- San Diego Chargers (1965); New York Jets (1965); Toronto Argonauts (1966)

Career AFL statistics
- Rushing yards: 25
- Rushing average: 3.6
- Touchdowns: 2
- Stats at Pro Football Reference

Kern Carson (January 29, 1941 – March 2, 2002) was an American football halfback. He played for the San Diego Chargers and New York Jets in 1965 and for the Toronto Argonauts in 1966.
