= Robert West (American football) =

American football player (born 1950)

No. 26, 85
- Position: Wide receiver

Personal information
- Born: October 3, 1950 (age 76); San Diego, California, U.S.
- Listed height: 6 ft 4 in (1.93 m)
- Listed weight: 218 lb (99 kg)

Career information
- High school: Lincoln (San Diego)
- College: San Diego State
- NFL draft: 1972: 4th round, 90th overall pick

Career history
- Dallas Cowboys (1972)*; Kansas City Chiefs (1972-1973); San Francisco 49ers (1974); Oakland Raiders (1975)*
- * Offseason or practice squad member only

Career NFL statistics
- Receptions: 13
- Receiving yards: 230
- Receiving TDs: 2
- Stats at Pro Football Reference

Robert Harold West (born October 3, 1950) is an American former professional football player who was a wide receiver in the National Football League (NFL) for the Kansas City Chiefs and San Francisco 49ers. He played college football for the San Diego State Aztecs.

== Early life ==
West attended Lincoln High School. He accepted a football scholarship from San Diego State University, where he played under head coach Don Coryell and was a three-year starter at wide receiver.

As a senior in 1971, he tallied 11 receptions for 265 yards (24.1-yard avg.) and 2 touchdowns. He set a school record for the longest pass play when he caught a 92-yard pass from quarterback Brian Sipe, while playing against Fresno State University.

== Professional career ==
=== Dallas Cowboys ===
West was selected by the Dallas Cowboys in the fourth round (90th overall) of the 1972 NFL draft. He was released on September 11.

=== Kansas City Chiefs ===
On September 13, 1972, he was claimed off waivers by the Kansas City Chiefs. As a rookie, he appeared in 11 games (5 starts), registering 9 receptions for 165 yards and 2 touchdowns. The next year, he appeared in 8 games as a backup. On September 8, 1974, he was traded to the San Francisco 49ers in exchange for a sixth round draft choice (#139-Dave Wasick).

=== San Francisco 49ers ===
In 1974, he appeared in 10 games as a backup. On July 24, 1975, having a surplus at wide receiver, the San Francisco 49ers traded him to the Oakland Raiders in exchange for a future draft choice (not exercised).

=== Oakland Raiders ===
West was released by the Oakland Raiders on August 12, 1975.
