= Mike Houghton =

American football player (born 1979)

No. 69
- Positions: Guard, tackle

Personal information
- Born: December 1, 1979 (age 46); Northridge, California, U.S.
- Listed height: 6 ft 3 in (1.91 m)
- Listed weight: 315 lb (143 kg)

Career information
- High school: Mission Bay (CA)
- College: San Diego State
- NFL draft: 2002: 6th round, 200th overall pick

Career history
- Green Bay Packers (2002)*; Buffalo Bills (2002); Carolina Panthers (2003–2004)*
- * Offseason or practice squad member only
- Stats at Pro Football Reference

Michael Christopher Houghton (born December 1, 1979) is an American former professional football guard in the National Football League (NFL).

== Biography ==
Houghton was born on December 1, 1979, in Northridge, California. He is now a teacher in Menifee, California as a PE and history teacher.

== Career ==
Houghton was selected by the Green Bay Packers in the sixth round of the 2002 NFL draft and would be a member of the Buffalo Bills that season. He played at the collegiate level at San Diego State University.
