= 2007 San Diego State Aztecs football team =

American college football season

2007 San Diego State Aztecs football
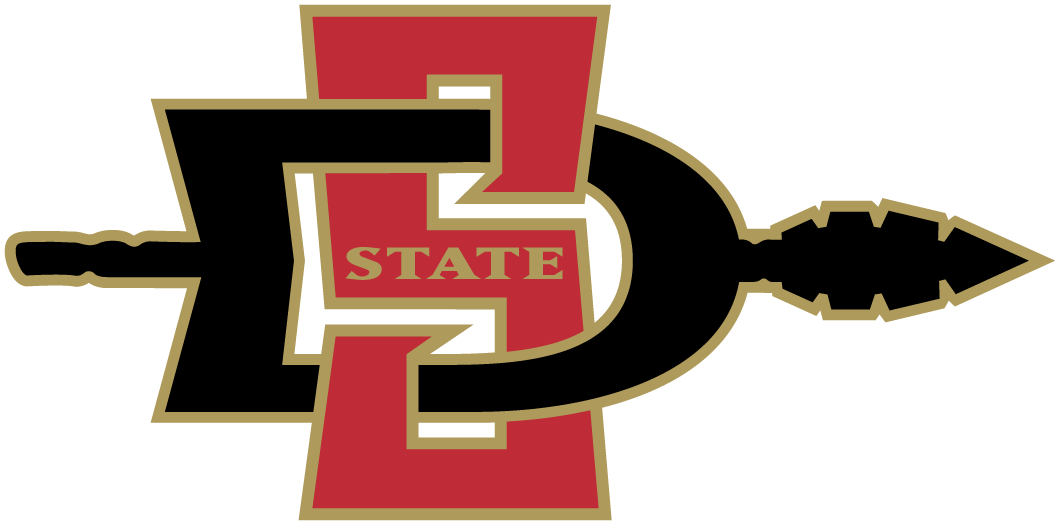
- Conference: Mountain West Conference
- Record: 4–8 (3–5 MW)
- Head coach: Chuck Long (2nd season)
- Offensive coordinator: Del Miller (2nd season)
- Offensive scheme: Pro-style
- Defensive coordinator: Bob Elliott (2nd season)
- Base defense: 4–3
- Home stadium: Qualcomm Stadium

2007 Mountain West Conference football standings
	Conf.			Overall
Team	W		L	W		L
No. 14 BYU $	8	–	0	11	–	2
Air Force	6	–	2	9	–	4
New Mexico	5	–	3	9	–	4
Utah	5	–	3	9	–	4
TCU	4	–	4	8	–	5
San Diego State	3	–	5	4	–	8
Wyoming	2	–	6	5	–	7
Colorado State	2	–	6	3	–	9
UNLV	1	–	7	2	–	10
$ – Conference champion; Rankings from AP Poll

The 2007 San Diego State Aztecs football team represented San Diego State University in the 2007 NCAA Division I FBS college football season. The Aztecs, led by head coach Chuck Long, played their home games at Qualcomm Stadium. They finished with a record of 4–8 (3–5 MWC).

== Schedule ==
Date	Time	Opponent	Site	TV	Result	Attendance	Source
September 8	4:00 pm	at Washington State*	Qwest Field; Seattle, WA		L 17–45	46,290	
September 15	7:00 pm	at Arizona State*	Sun Devil Stadium; Tempe, AZ	FSNAZ	L 13–34	54,617	
September 22	3:30 pm	Portland State*	Qualcomm Stadium; San Diego, CA	mtn	W 52–17	53,110	
September 29	7:00 pm	No. 24 Cincinnati*	Qualcomm Stadium; San Diego, CA	Versus	L 23–52	24,647	
October 6	2:30 pm	at Colorado State	Hughes Stadium; Fort Collins, CO	mtn	W 24–20	27,930	
October 13	12:00 pm	at Utah	Rice–Eccles Stadium; Salt Lake City, UT	4SD	L 7–23	40,898	
October 20	5:30 pm	New Mexico	Qualcomm Stadium; San Diego, CA	CSTV	L 17–20	20,205	
November 3	6:00 pm	Wyoming	Qualcomm Stadium; San Diego, CA	mtn	W 27–24	22,852	
November 10	8:00 pm	at UNLV	Sam Boyd Stadium; Whitney, NV	CSTV	W 38–30	18,837	
November 17	11:00 am	at Air Force	Falcon Stadium; Colorado Springs, CO	mtn	L 23–55	34,227	
November 24	5:00 pm	TCU	Qualcomm Stadium; San Diego, CA		L 33–45	18,350	
December 1	3:30 pm	No. 21 BYU	Qualcomm Stadium; San Diego, CA	mtn	L 27–48	28,473	
*Non-conference game; Rankings from AP Poll released prior to the game; All times are in Pacific time
