= Dave Grayson =

American football player (1939–2017)

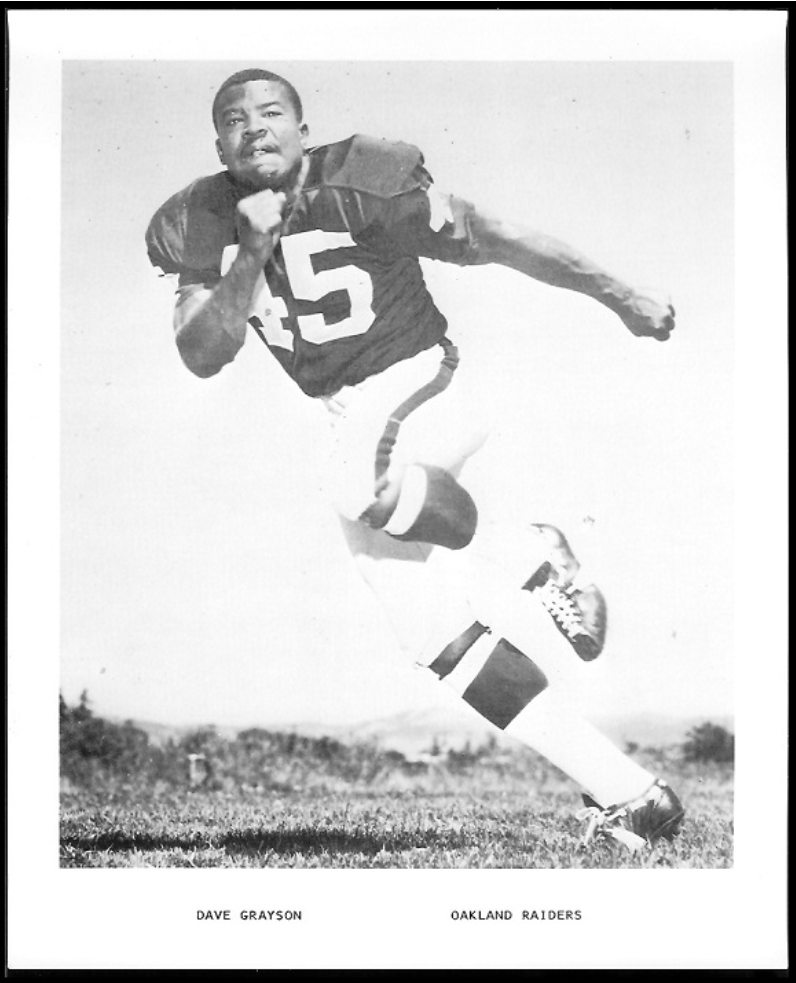
- Promotional image of Grayson, 1969

No. 45
- Positions: Cornerback, safety

Personal information
- Born: June 6, 1939; San Diego, California, U.S.
- Died: July 29, 2017 (aged 78)
- Listed height: 5 ft 10 in (1.78 m)
- Listed weight: 187 lb (85 kg)

Career information
- High school: Lincoln (San Diego)
- College: Oregon (1959–1960)
- NFL draft: 1961: undrafted

Career history
- Dallas Cowboys (1961)*; Dallas Texans / Kansas City Chiefs (1961–1964); Oakland Raiders (1965–1970)
- * Offseason or practice squad member only

Awards and highlights
- 2× AFL champion (1962, 1967); 4× First-team All-AFL (1964, 1965, 1968, 1969); Second-team All-AFL (1966); 6× AFL All-Star (1962–1966, 1969); AFL interceptions leader (1968); AFL All-Time Team; AFL record: Most career interceptions: 47

Career AFL/NFL statistics
- Interceptions: 48
- Interception yards: 933
- Fumble recoveries: 2
- Sacks: 1
- Defensive touchdowns: 5
- Return yards: 2,839
- Return touchdowns: 1
- Stats at Pro Football Reference

David Lee Grayson (June 6, 1939 – July 29, 2017) was an American professional football cornerback and safety who played in the American Football League (AFL) and the National Football League (NFL) for the Dallas Texans / Kansas City Chiefs and the Oakland Raiders. He played college football for the Oregon Webfoots.

== Early life ==
Grayson attended San Diego High School, playing running back and defensive back. As a sophomore, he helped his team achieve an 11-0-1 record, while outscoring opponents 382-65 and being awarded the mythical National championship by the National Sports News Service. After the season he transferred to Lincoln High School.

After graduating from high school he went on to play at San Diego City College. Besides football, in track he was a part of the 4 × 200 metres relay team that set a national junior college record.

As a junior, he transferred to the University of Oregon, where he played offensive and defensive halfback.

In 1982, he was inducted into the Oregon Sports Hall of Fame. In 2010, he was inducted into the Breitbard Hall of Fame.

== Professional career ==
In 1961, he was signed as an undrafted free agent by the Dallas Cowboys, but because head coach Tom Landry felt he lacked size for the physical play that was needed in NFL at the time, Chief talent scout Gil Brandt called the AFL's Dallas Texans head coach Hank Stram and suggested he give Grayson a look.

Grayson made the team and played four years with the Dallas Texans/Kansas City Chiefs. In 1961, he set the franchise and AFL record for the longest interception return with a 99-yarder against the New York Titans. In 1961, he also led the league in kickoff returns. In 1962 and 1963, he finished second in the league in kickoff returns. In 1965, he was traded to the Oakland Raiders in exchange for cornerback Fred Williamson.

Grayson held the AFL record for longest interception return for a touchdown, 99 yards, against the New York Titans in 1961. He had an interception off George Blanda in the Texans' 1962 double-overtime championship game victory over the defending AFL champion Houston Oilers. Grayson was an AFL All-Star six times, with the Texans/Chiefs in 1962, 1963 and 1964, and with the Raiders in 1965, 1966 and 1969.

In 1967, he was moved from right cornerback to safety. He made a 48-yard return with the opening kickoff against the Oilers in the 1967 AFL Championship Game, helping his team win the game and reach Super Bowl II. In 1968, he led the AFL with 10 interceptions. His 29 interceptions rank seventh all-time in Raiders history.

Grayson is the all-time AFL leader in interceptions with 47, and interception return yards with 908; averaging 19.3 yards per return, with five touchdown returns. He averaged 25.4 yards on 110 kickoff returns. He is a member of the AFL All-Time Team.

Despite his accomplishments, Grayson has yet to be inducted into the Pro Football Hall of Fame. He remains the only first-team defensive back from the AFL All-Time Team to not be selected.

In 2017, the Professional Football Researchers Association named Grayson to the PFRA Hall of Very Good Class of 2017.

== Personal life ==
After football he opened different businesses, which included one of the biggest nightclubs in Southeast San Diego during the seventies. He also was involved with organizations like the Boys Club, YMCA and the Committee for Community Involvement of Black Athletes.

Grayson died on July 29, 2017. His son, David Lee Grayson Jr. played linebacker in the NFL from 1987 to 1990 with the Cleveland Browns and in 1991 with the San Diego Chargers.
