= George Jones (American football) =

American football player (born 1973)

No. 43, 22
- Position: Running back

Personal information
- Born: December 31, 1973 (age 52); Greenville, South Carolina, U.S.
- Listed height: 5 ft 9 in (1.75 m)
- Listed weight: 204 lb (93 kg)

Career information
- High school: Eastside (Taylors, South Carolina)
- College: San Diego State
- NFL draft: 1997: 5th round, 154th overall pick

Career history
- Pittsburgh Steelers (1997); Jacksonville Jaguars (1998); Cleveland Browns (1999); Winnipeg Blue Bombers (2000)

Awards and highlights
- WAC Offensive Player of the Year (1995)

Career NFL statistics
- Rushing yards: 371
- Rushing average: 3.1
- Receptions: 17
- Receiving yards: 105
- Total touchdowns: 2
- Stats at Pro Football Reference

George Dee Jones (born December 31, 1973) is an American former professional football player who was a running back in the National Football League (NFL). He played college football for the San Diego State Aztecs, earning second-team All-American honors in 1995. He is currently Co-Hosting a show called “Football, Fatherhood, & Life”, with Troy Geary and founder of The Present Dad Foundation.

Despite having a stellar college career at San Diego State, where Jones broke many of Marshall Faulk's rushing records, his pro career was shorten by injuries. He was selected in the fifth round of the 1997 NFL draft. He made his NFL debut during the 1997 season with the Pittsburgh Steelers, serving as a halfback for most of the season while Tim Lester was on injured reserve. The following season, he was released by the Steelers and moved on to the Jacksonville Jaguars before finishing his career with the expansion Cleveland Browns in 1999.

Before he joined the NFL, he bought a car, and then his parents bought him a plane ticket to Bakersfield, California to which he flew from Greenville, South Carolina. He played junior college football for the Bakersfield College Renegades for two seasons, garnering All-America honors in 1994.

== Post-NFL career ==
Since his retirement from NFL in 1999 he had 3 children, one of which is with Down syndrome. The older one is eight years of and receives coaching in American football from George Jones himself. In an interview with PGH Sports Daily he said that "[NFL] was the greatest thing that ever happened to me". He also started a podcast with his Co-Host, Troy Geary called, “Football, Fatherhood, & Life”. They talk to former NFL players and celebrities about the three pillars of their shows’ name. His son’s names are GJ, Max, and Cooper.
