= Todd Santos =

American football player (born 1964)

Profile
- Position: Quarterback

Personal information
- Born: February 12, 1964 (age 62); Fresno, California, U.S.

Career information
- High school: Selma (CA)
- College: San Diego State
- NFL draft: 1988: 10th round, 274th overall pick

Career history
- New Orleans Saints (1988)*; San Francisco 49ers (1988)
- * Offseason or practice squad member only

Awards and highlights
- NCAA passing yards leader (1987); WAC Offensive Player of the Year (1987); First-team All-WAC (1987); San Diego State Aztecs jersey No. 8 retired

Todd Santos (born February 12, 1964) is an American former professional football player who was a quarterback in the National Football League (NFL). He played college football for the San Diego State Aztecs, setting a major college football career passing record with 11,425 yards. He was selected by the New Orleans Saints in the tenth round of the 1988 NFL draft.

== College career ==
Santos was the MVP of the 1986 Holiday Bowl.

== Professional career ==
Santos was cut by the Saints after not having played in their three exhibition games. He was signed mid-season by the San Francisco 49ers after injuries to starter Joe Montana.

== See also ==
- List of NCAA major college football yearly passing leaders
- List of NCAA major college football yearly total offense leaders
