= Jeff Webb (gridiron football) =

American football player (born 1982)

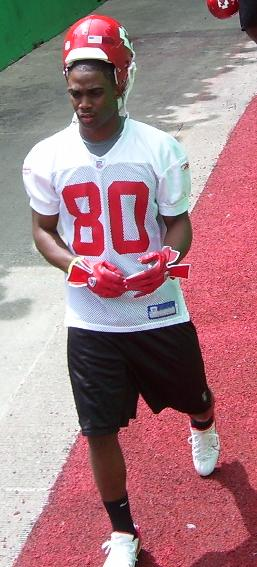
- Webb with the Kansas City Chiefs in 2007

No. 80
- Position: Wide receiver

Personal information
- Born: January 31, 1982 (age 44); Pontiac, Michigan, U.S.
- Listed height: 6 ft 2 in (1.88 m)
- Listed weight: 211 lb (96 kg)

Career information
- High school: La Quinta (La Quinta, California)
- College: San Diego State
- NFL draft: 2006: 6th round, 190th overall pick

Career history
- Kansas City Chiefs (2006–2008); Toronto Argonauts (2010); Omaha Nighthawks (2011)

Awards and highlights
- Second-team All-MW (2005)

Career NFL statistics
- Receptions: 36
- Receiving yards: 382
- Receiving touchdowns: 1
- Stats at Pro Football Reference

Jeffrey Leon Webb (born January 31, 1982) is an American former professional football player who was a wide receiver in the National Football League (NFL) and Canadian Football League (CFL). He was selected by the Kansas City Chiefs in the sixth round of the 2006 NFL draft. He played college football for the San Diego State Aztecs.

Webb also played for the Toronto Argonauts.

== Professional career ==
Pre-draft measurables
Height	Weight	Arm length	Hand span	40-yard dash	10-yard split	20-yard split	20-yard shuttle	Three-cone drill	Vertical jump	Broad jump
6 ft 2 1/8 in (1.88 m)	211 lb (96 kg)	32 1/4 in (0.82 m)	9 3/8 in (0.24 m)	4.41 s	1.54 s	2.59 s	4.08 s	6.81 s	37.0 in (0.94 m)	10 ft 6 in (3.20 m)
All values from NFL Combine

=== Kansas City Chiefs ===
Webb played the first three seasons of his career with the Kansas City Chiefs and played in 31 games, catching 36 passes for 382 yards and a touchdown.

=== Toronto Argonauts ===
On April 22, 2010, Webb signed with the Toronto Argonauts of the Canadian Football League. He was released by the Argonauts on August 31.

=== Omaha Nighthawks ===
Webb signed with the Omaha Nighthawks of the United Football League on August 25, 2011.
