= DeMarco Sampson =

American football player (born 1985)

No. 89
- Position: Wide receiver

Personal information
- Born: December 19, 1985 (age 40); Chula Vista, California, U.S.
- Listed height: 6 ft 2 in (1.88 m)
- Listed weight: 204 lb (93 kg)

Career information
- High school: Castle Park (Chula Vista)
- College: San Diego State
- NFL draft: 2011: 7th round, 249th overall pick

Career history
- Arizona Cardinals (2011); Philadelphia Eagles (2013)*; Buffalo Bills (2013)*; San Francisco 49ers (2014)*; Los Angeles Kiss (2014–2016)
- * Offseason or practice squad member only

Awards and highlights
- First-team All-MW (2010); Second-team All-MW (2009)

Career NFL statistics
- Receptions: 3
- Receiving yards: 36
- Stats at Pro Football Reference

Career AFL statistics
- Receptions: 75
- Receiving yards: 871
- Receiving touchdowns: 10
- Return yards: 451
- Return touchdowns: 1
- Stats at ArenaFan.com

DeMarco Sampson, Jr. (born December 19, 1985) is an American former professional football player who was a wide receiver in the National Football League (NFL). He played college football for the San Diego State Aztecs.

== Early life ==
Sampson played high school football at Castle Park High School in Chula Vista, California.

== College career ==
Sampson was one of only two freshmen to earn a letter in 2005. He appeared in all 12 games recording six receptions for 60 yards and a touchdown.

He did not play at all in the 2006 season due to a foot injury he suffered during an intrasquad scrimmage in August. He missed his second straight year in 2007 due to an injury.

He saw action in 11 games as a reserve in 2008. He caught 11 passes for 111 yards and one touchdown.

Sampson re-earned his starting job in 2009. He accumulated 62 receptions for 851 yards and eight touchdowns. His performance earned him second-team all-Mountain West Conference honors.

Sampson returned to school for his sixth year of eligibility in 2010. He had a career year by catching 67 passes for 1,220 yards and eight touchdowns. His outstanding numbers earned him a spot on the 2010 All-Mountain West First-team as voted by the coaches.

== Professional career ==
Pre-draft measurables
Height	Weight	Arm length	Hand span	Wingspan	40-yard dash	10-yard split	20-yard split	20-yard shuttle	Three-cone drill	Vertical jump	Broad jump	Bench press
6 ft 2 in (1.88 m)	204 lb (93 kg)	33 in (0.84 m)	9 5/8 in (0.24 m)	6 ft 7 5/8 in (2.02 m)	4.41 s	1.53 s	2.58 s	4.26 s	6.93 s	35.5 in (0.90 m)	10 ft 0 in (3.05 m)	14 reps
All values from NFL Combine/Pro Day

=== Arizona Cardinals ===
Sampson was selected in the seventh round with the 249th overall pick in the 2011 NFL draft by the Arizona Cardinals.

=== Buffalo Bills ===
Sampson signed with the Buffalo Bills on May 30, 2013. On August 26, 2013, he was cut by the Bills.

=== Los Angeles Kiss ===
Sampson was assigned to the Los Angeles Kiss of the Arena Football League on January 2, 2014. He was activated from the "other league exempt" list on May 13, 2014.

=== San Francisco 49ers ===
Sampson was signed by the San Francisco 49ers on January 14, 2014. Sampson was waived on May 12, 2014.

== Coaching career ==
Sampson served as an assistant coach at Hilltop High School in Chula Vista under head coach Drew Westling. In 2018, a fellow Hilltop coach and former high school teammate of his, Freddy Dunkle, was hired as head coach at Montgomery High School, and Sampson followed him as his offensive coordinator.

== Personal life ==
Sampson was born in Oakland, California to Karen and DeMarco Sampson. His mother's cousin is former Cincinnati Bengals running back, Icky Woods.
