= Dan McGwire =

American football player (born 1967)

No. 10, 11
- Position: Quarterback

Personal information
- Born: December 18, 1967 (age 58); Pomona, California, U.S.
- Listed height: 6 ft 8 in (2.03 m)
- Listed weight: 240 lb (109 kg)

Career information
- High school: Claremont (Claremont, California)
- College: Iowa (1986–1987); San Diego State (1988–1990)
- NFL draft: 1991: 1st round, 16th overall pick

Career history
- Seattle Seahawks (1991–1994); Miami Dolphins (1995)

Awards and highlights
- First-team All-WAC (1990)

Career NFL statistics
- Passing attempts: 148
- Passing completions: 74
- Completion percentage: 50.0%
- TD–INT: 2–6
- Passing yards: 745
- Passer rating: 52.3
- Stats at Pro Football Reference

Daniel Scott McGwire (born December 18, 1967) is an American former professional football player who was a quarterback for the Seattle Seahawks and Miami Dolphins of the National Football League (NFL). He played college football for the San Diego State Aztecs.

== Early life ==
McGwire was born in Pomona, California, and is a former Parade Magazine All-American at Claremont High School in Claremont, California. He made Street & Smith's top 50 list, was named honorable mention all-America by USA Today, completed 203 of 328 passes (61.9 percent) for 3,172 yards and 33 touchdowns as a senior, punted for a 40-yard average, led his team to California's East Sectional title (includes 550 teams), was named California's 1985 Offensive Player of the Year, made the Cal-Hi Sports first-team all-state squad, quarterbacked squad to three-year record of 36–3–1 including 13–1 mark as a senior, passed for 345 and 303 yards in sectional championship games as junior and senior, was named 1985 state MVP, and accumulated three-year varsity totals of 6,559 yards passing and 65 touchdowns. He was also a double-figure scorer and rebounder his last two seasons in basketball.

== College career ==
McGwire initially enrolled with the University of Iowa where he played for two seasons in limited action before transferring to San Diego State University. In 1989, McGwire passed for 3,651 yards for 16 touchdowns and 19 interceptions. In 1990, he threw for 3,883 yards, 27 touchdowns, and seven interceptions and earned first-team all-WAC honors.

Career statistics

| | | Passing | | | | | | Rushing | | | |
| Year | Team | Comp | Att | Yds | TD | INT | Rtg | Att | Yds | Avg | TD |
|---|---|---|---|---|---|---|---|---|---|---|---|
| 1986 | Iowa | 6 | 12 | 174 | 2 | 1 | 210.1 | 3 | −23 | −7.7 | 2 |
| 1987 | Iowa | 41 | 72 | 506 | 4 | 3 | 126.0 | 7 | −36 | −5.1 | 0 |
| 1989 | San Diego State | 258 | 440 | 3,651 | 16 | 19 | 131.7 | 64 | −228 | −3.6 | 2 |
| 1990 | San Diego State | 270 | 449 | 3,833 | 27 | 7 | 148.6 | 35 | −169 | −4.8 | 1 |
| Career | | 575 | 973 | 8,164 | 49 | 30 | 140.0 | 109 | −456 | −4.2 | 5 |

== Professional career ==
Pre-draft measurables
| Height | Weight | Arm length | Hand span | 40-yard dash | 10-yard split | 20-yard split | 20-yard shuttle | Vertical jump | Broad jump |
|---|---|---|---|---|---|---|---|---|---|
| 6 ft 7 7/8 in (2.03 m) | 243 lb (110 kg) | 34 1/2 in (0.88 m) | 10 1/4 in (0.26 m) | 5.10 s | 1.78 s | 2.96 s | 4.36 s | 31.5 in (0.80 m) | 9 ft 6 in (2.90 m) |
All values from NFL Combine

McGwire was a first round draft pick (16th overall) to the Seattle Seahawks in 1991 and went on to play for five seasons in the National Football League (NFL), from 1991 to 1995. At six feet and eight inches, McGwire was the tallest quarterback to play in the NFL upon his professional debut. He played four seasons for the Seahawks and one season for the Miami Dolphins. He was a backup to Dave Krieg in his rookie season but was expected to be the quarterback of the future. In his second season, he was underwhelming in the preseason and was named third-string quarterback behind Stan Gelbaugh and Kelly Stouffer. In 1993, the Seahawks drafted Rick Mirer out of the University of Notre Dame in the first round, seemingly giving up on McGwire. In 1994 after an injury to Mirer, McGwire got the first and only extended playing time of his career. He started three games, in which the team went 1–2, and on the season threw 105 passes, completing 51 of them for 578 yards and one touchdown. The brief playing time did not materialize into anything larger however, and that would be his last season for the Seahawks. After spending one season in Miami he was out of football.

McGwire is generally considered a first round bust, given the fact that he was the first quarterback taken in the 1991 draft that saw Brett Favre go in the second round.

=== NFL statistics ===
| Year | Team | GP | Comp | Att | Pct | Yds | Avg | Lng | TD | Int | Rtg | Fum |
|---|---|---|---|---|---|---|---|---|---|---|---|---|
| 1991 | SEA | 1 | 3 | 7 | 42.9 | 27 | 3.86 | 13 | 0 | 1 | 14.3 | 0 |
| 1992 | SEA | 2 | 17 | 30 | 56.7 | 116 | 3.87 | 20 | 0 | 3 | 25.8 | 0 |
| 1993 | SEA | 2 | 3 | 5 | 60.0 | 24 | 4.80 | 17 | 1 | 0 | 111.7 | 0 |
| 1994 | SEA | 7 | 51 | 105 | 48.6 | 578 | 5.51 | 36 | 1 | 2 | 60.7 | 5 |
| 1995 | MIA | 1 | 0 | 1 | 0.0 | 0 | 0.00 | 0 | 0 | 0 | 39.6 | 0 |
| Career | | 13 | 74 | 148 | 50.0 | 745 | 5.03 | 36 | 2 | 6 | 52.3 | 5 |

== Personal life ==
McGwire's older brother is former Major League Baseball player Mark McGwire.

From his previous marriage to Dana Orlich, daughter of NFL defensive end Dan Orlich, Dan McGwire has three daughters, two of whom played Division I college basketball. Oldest daughter Morgan, a 6'5 forward, played for Santa Clara from 2014 to 2018. Younger daughter Mallory, a six-foot-five center, played at Oregon from 2016 to 2018 before transferring to Boise State, where she has been active since the 2019–20 season.

After retiring from football, McGwire moved to Reno, Nevada, and worked as an insurance agent and lighting company executive.
