= J. R. Tolver =

American football player (born 1980)

No. 81
- Position: Wide receiver

Personal information
- Born: January 13, 1980 (age 46); Long Beach, California, U.S.
- Listed height: 6 ft 1 in (1.85 m)
- Listed weight: 205 lb (93 kg)

Career information
- High school: Mira Mesa (San Diego, California)
- College: San Diego State
- NFL draft: 2003: 5th round, 169th overall pick

Career history
- Miami Dolphins (2003–2004); Carolina Panthers (2005)*; Dallas Cowboys (2005–2006)*; Calgary Stampeders (2007); Los Angeles Avengers (2008)*
- * Offseason or practice squad member only

Awards and highlights
- Second-team All-American (2002); First-team All-MW (2002); 2× Second-team All-MW (2000, 2001)
- Stats at CFL.ca (archive)
- Stats at ArenaFan.com

Gregory D. Tolver Jr. (born January 13, 1980) is an American former professional football player who was a wide receiver in the National Football League (NFL), Canadian Football League (CFL), and Arena Football League (AFL). He played college football for the San Diego State Aztecs.

== Playing career ==
=== High school ===
He was a two-year starter and a three-year letterman as the quarterback of the Mira Mesa Marauders. During his senior year, he was selected to the All-Academic team and he was also named the Most Valuable Player for the Marauders. He passed for 1,880 yards and 15 touchdowns along with 1,004 yards and 5 touchdowns in his last year. Although Tolver's main focus was football, he was also a two-year letterman on the Mira Mesa men's basketball team.

=== College career ===
Tolver attended college at San Diego State University, where he would earn a degree in business. Tolver finished his collegiate career for the San Diego State Aztecs with a total of 262 receptions for 3,572 yards and 17 touchdowns.

During his senior year with the Aztecs, he accumulated 128 catches for 1,785 yards and 13 touchdowns, which made him a unanimous choice to be on the All-Mountain West Conference First Team. He was also placed on a couple of All-American teams after leading the entire nation in receiving yards per game with 137 yards per contest (13.9 yards per reception). He also finished second in the nation in catches per game, averaging close to 9 receptions per game. By scoring 86 points as a senior, Tolver led SDSU in scoring and was honored by the Mountain West Conference as the Player of the Week three times, including after a 12-reception, 296-yard game versus the Arizona State Sun Devils. During his junior season, he was the Aztecs' leading receiver with 63 receptions for 878 yards and 2 touchdowns. He became a starter as a redshirt sophomore followed by a 62-catch, 808-yard season.

=== Professional career ===
Pre-draft measurables
Height	Weight	Arm length	Hand span	40-yard dash	10-yard split	20-yard split	20-yard shuttle	Three-cone drill	Vertical jump	Broad jump
6 ft 1 in (1.85 m)	202 lb (92 kg)	31 3/4 in (0.81 m)	9 3/8 in (0.24 m)	4.66 s	1.61 s	2.73 s	4.23 s	6.99 s	36 in (0.91 m)	9 ft 11 in (3.02 m)
All values from NFL Combine.

In the 2003 NFL draft, Tolver was selected in the fifth round as the 169th pick by the Miami Dolphins.

On November 25, 2003, he was placed on the injured reserve list due to a right knee injury. He was removed from the Injured Reserved list on February 23, 2004, but would eventually be cut on September 5, 2004. On October 19, 2005, Tolver was the newest addition to the Dallas Cowboys practice squad and on January 3, 2006, the Cowboys signed him to the team. But it would not last long with him being cut from the team on August 28, 2006. After spending four years in and out of the NFL, he finally landed in the Arena Football League, signing a contract with the Los Angeles Avengers on February 14, 2008.

== Broadcasting career ==
Tolver is a guest member on the NBC 7/39 Football Night sportscaster team in San Diego.

== Coaching career ==
Tolver is the head coach for Sage Hill School's football team. His first season was the fall 2009 season, when he led the Lightning to a 7–4 season (2–1 in league) which helped redeem the team after winning only 2 games in the 2008 season before Tolver signed on as the coach. In his second season, he led the Lightning to an 8–3 record. Tolver also serves as the school's athletic director.

== Personal life ==
During his younger years, he collected over 5,000 sports cards, including Barry Sanders' and Jerry Rice's rookie cards. He also started a business of his own in solid waste management.

Tolver's younger brother, Tre'dale Tolver, attended and played football at Cal Poly San Luis Obispo. Tolver also spent a number of years in Mansfield, Louisiana. His father was a standout quarterback at DeSoto High School in Mansfield and Lynwood High School in Lynwood, California, during the mid-1970s.

== See also ==
- List of NCAA major college football yearly receiving leaders
