= Matt Kofler =

American football player (1959–2008)

No. 10 (BUF), 12 (IND)
- Position: Quarterback

Personal information
- Born: August 30, 1959; Longview, Washington, U.S.
- Died: December 19, 2008 (aged 49); El Cajon, California, U.S.
- Listed height: 6 ft 3 in (1.91 m)
- Listed weight: 192 lb (87 kg)

Career information
- High school: Patrick Henry (San Diego, California)
- College: San Diego State
- NFL draft: 1982: 2nd round, 48th overall pick

Career history
- Buffalo Bills (1982–1984); Indianapolis Colts (1985); Philadelphia Eagles (1987)*
- * Offseason or practice squad member only

Career NFL statistics
- Passing attempts: 202
- Passing completions: 91
- Completion percentage: 45.0%
- TD–INT: 7–11
- Passing yards: 1,156
- Passer rating: 52.3
- Stats at Pro Football Reference

Mathew Joseph Kofler (August 30, 1959 – December 19, 2008) was an American professional football player who was a quarterback in the National Football League (NFL) from 1982 to 1985. He played for the Buffalo Bills and the Indianapolis Colts. He was appointed head coach at San Diego Mesa College in 2006.

== Early life ==
Kofler played high school football for Patrick Henry High School in San Diego.

Kofler was first-team JUCO All-American quarterback for the San Diego Mesa Olympians. He led all community colleges in the nation in total offense and was named California Player of the Year. In 1980, he transferred to San Diego State on a football scholarship to continue his career.

== Professional career ==
The Buffalo Bills selected Kofler 48th overall in the second round of the 1982 NFL draft. Kofler also played one final season with the Indianapolis Colts.

== Post-playing career ==
Kofler was as an associate professor at San Diego Mesa College. Starting in 1998, he served the football program as offensive coordinator and director of recruitment. He was named the team's head coach in 2006 and spent three seasons in the role but poor health forced him to miss the final six games of the 2008 season. He died of an undisclosed illness in his home in El Cajon, California, on December 19, 2008.
