= David Grayson (American football) =

American football player (born 1964)

No. 52, 56, 58
- Position: Linebacker

Personal information
- Born: February 27, 1964 (age 62); San Diego, California, U.S.
- Listed height: 6 ft 2 in (1.88 m)
- Listed weight: 230 lb (104 kg)

Career information
- High school: Lincoln (San Diego)
- College: Fresno State
- NFL draft: 1987: 8th round, 217th overall pick

Career history
- San Francisco 49ers (1987)*; Cleveland Browns (1987–1990); San Diego Chargers (1991–1993)
- * Offseason or practice squad member only

Career NFL statistics
- Sacks: 8
- Interceptions: 3
- Fumble recoveries: 4
- Stats at Pro Football Reference

David Lee Grayson Jr. (born February 27, 1964) is an American former professional football player who was a linebacker for five seasons in the National Football League (NFL) with the Cleveland Browns and San Diego Chargers. He was selected by the San Francisco 49ers in the eighth round of the 1987 NFL draft with the 217th overall pick. Grayson played college football for the Fresno State Bulldogs and prepped at Lincoln High in Southeast San Diego.

Grayson's father, Dave Grayson, played three years in the American Football League (AFL) with the Dallas Texans, the Kansas City Chiefs and the Oakland Raiders and then 6 years in the NFL after the two leagues merged.
