= Patrick Rowe (American football) =

American football player (born 1969)

No. 86
- Position: Wide receiver

Personal information
- Born: February 17, 1969 (age 57); San Diego, California, U.S.
- Listed height: 6 ft 1 in (1.85 m)
- Listed weight: 195 lb (88 kg)

Career information
- High school: Lincoln (San Diego)
- College: San Diego State (1987–1991)
- NFL draft: 1992: 2nd round, 52nd overall pick

Career history
- Cleveland Browns (1992–1993); San Francisco 49ers (1995)*; Philadelphia Eagles (1995)*
- * Offseason or practice squad member only

Awards and highlights
- Second-team All-American (1990); NCAA Division I-A receiving yards leader (1990); First-team All-WAC (1990)

Career NFL statistics
- Receptions: 3
- Receiving yards: 37
- Stats at Pro Football Reference

Patrick Donald Edward Rowe (born February 17, 1969) is an American former professional football player who was a wide receiver for one season with the Cleveland Browns of the National Football League (NFL). He played college football for the San Diego State Aztecs, earning second-team All-American honors in 1990. He was selected by the Browns in the second round of the 1992 NFL draft.

== Early life ==
Patrick Donald Edward Rowe was born on February 17, 1969, in San Diego, California. He attended Lincoln High School in San Diego. He snapped a collarbone during a high school football all-star game after his senior year.

== College career ==
Rowe played college football for the San Diego State Aztecs of San Diego State University. He was a letterman in 1987, 1988, 1990, and 1991. Rowe caught nine passes for 197 yards his freshman year in 1987 while also returning three kicks for 109 yards. In 1988, he recorded 18 receptions for 267 yards and one touchdown, and 31 kick returns for 799 yards. He redshirted the 1989 season after tearing a cartilage in his knee before the start of fall camp. In 1990, Rowe caught 71 passes for 1,392 yards and eight touchdowns while returning 15 kicks for 324 yards, earning Associated Press second-team All-American honors. His 1,392 receiving yards were the most in NCAA Division I-A that season. His nine straight games of at least 100 receiving yards in 1991 set an NCAA Division I-A record. As a senior in 1991, Rowe totaled 57 receptions for 822 yards and four touchdowns.

== Professional career ==
Rowe was selected by the Cleveland Browns in the second round, with the 52nd overall pick, of the 1992 NFL draft. He officially signed with the team on July 16. He was placed on injured reserve on August 25, 1992, and missed the entire season. Rowe played in five games for the Browns in 1993, catching three passes for 37 yards on ten targets. He was released on August 28, 1994.

Rowe signed with the San Francisco 49ers on March 20, 1995. He was released on July 11, 1995.

Rowe was signed by the Philadelphia Eagles on July 21, 1995, but released two days later.

== See also ==
- List of NCAA major college football yearly receiving leaders
