= Will Blackwell =

American football player (born 1975)

No. 89
- Position: Wide receiver

Personal information
- Born: July 9, 1975 (age 51); Texarkana, Texas, U.S.
- Listed height: 6 ft 0 in (1.83 m)
- Listed weight: 190 lb (86 kg)

Career information
- High school: Skyline (Oakland, California)
- College: San Diego State
- NFL draft: 1997: 2nd round, 53rd overall pick

Career history
- Pittsburgh Steelers (1997–2001); St. Louis Rams (2002)*
- * Offseason or practice squad member only

Awards and highlights
- WAC Freshman of the Year (1994)

Career NFL statistics
- Receptions: 67
- Receiving yards: 682
- Receiving touchdowns: 2
- Stats at Pro Football Reference

William Herman Blackwell Jr. (born July 9, 1975) is an American former professional football player who was a wide receiver for the Pittsburgh Steelers in the National Football League (NFL). Blackwell was picked in the second round of the 1997 NFL draft with high expectations based on his successful collegiate career with the San Diego State Aztecs, but he played sparingly in five years in the NFL. He now coaches the Skyline High School football team in Oakland, California.

== College ==
Blackwell decided to attend San Diego State University. Blackwell was WAC freshman of the year in 1994. Blackwell was Individual Statistical Leader with 86 catches and 1206 yards. Blackwell was coached by Dino Babers and Curtis Johnson. Blackwell was a 1000-yard receiver in 1996. Blackwell's combine results were enough to get him to the NFL.

Blackwell was Freshman of the year, 1994 and first team Western Athletic Conference in 1995 and 1996.

=== College stats ===
Receiving and Rushing

Year	Receiving
Year	Rec	Yds	Avg	TD
1994	51	689	13.5	6
1995	86	1207	14.0	8
1996	60	1000	16.7	11
Total	197	2896	14.7	25

Scoring

Year	Receiving
Year	G	Rec	Pts
1994	11	6	36
1995	12	8	48
1996	9	11	66
Total		25	150

== NFL ==
=== Career stats ===
Year	Rushing					Receiving
Year	Att	Yds	Avg	TD	Lng	Rec	Yds	Avg	TD	Lng
1997	2	14	7.0	0	11	12	168	14.0	1	46
1998	0	0	0	0	0	32	297	9.3	1	24
1999	0	0	0	0	0	20	186	9.3	0	26
2000	0	0	0	0	0	2	23	11.5	0	14
2001	0	0	0	0	0	1	8	8.0	0	8
Total	2	14	7.0	0	0	67	682	10.2	2	0

Blackwell was part of The Bill Walsh NFL Minority Coaching Fellowship, an annual program administered by the NFL Management Council and NFL Player. Blackwell was one of four interns hand picked.

Blackwell was only one of five Steelers to have returned kickoffs for touchdowns (JuJu Smith-Schuster in 2017, Antonio Brown in 2010, Allen Rossum in 2007, Antwaan Randle El in 2002 and Will Blackwell in 2000). In 2001, Blackwell reinjured his left knee in Pittsburgh's 21–3 loss to Jacksonville. Coach Bill Cowher said Blackwell, who missed the first half of last year with a knee injury. Blackwell along with four other LSU players were released August 28, 2012 in the first round of major cuts.

Blackwell spent one month with the St Louis Rams and was cut August 31, 2002.

== Personal life ==
Blackwell lives in California. Blackwell works for Oakland Unified School District. He is a Receiver Coach, Restorative Practice Facilitator and Assistant Athletic Director for McClymonds High School. Blackwell also is the Head Coach for Varsity Baseball and a Community relations liaison.

Blackwell is the African American Male Achievement Program Manager helping Oakland's public schools fight to save black boys.
